= 1920 St. Louis Cardinals season =

Major League Baseball season

1920 St. Louis Cardinals
- League: National League
- Ballpark: Cardinal Field (Since 1893); Sportsman's Park
- City: St. Louis, Missouri
- Record: 75–79 (.487)
- League place: 5th
- Owners: Sam Breadon
- Managers: Branch Rickey

The 1920 St. Louis Cardinals season was the team's 39th season in St. Louis, Missouri and the 29th season in the National League. The Cardinals went 75–79 during the season and finished fifth in the National League.

== Regular season ==
Rogers Hornsby became a full-time second baseman. Hornsby won the first of his seven batting titles with a .370 batting average, and he also led the league in on-base percentage (.431), slugging percentage (.559), hits (218), total bases (329), doubles (44), and RBI (94). From a fielding perspective, Hornsby led the league in putouts, assists, and double plays.

=== Season standings ===
National League
| Team | W | L | Pct. | GB | Home | Road |
|---|---|---|---|---|---|---|
| Brooklyn Robins | 93 | 61 | .604 | — | 49‍–‍29 | 44‍–‍32 |
| New York Giants | 86 | 68 | .558 | 7 | 45‍–‍35 | 41‍–‍33 |
| Cincinnati Reds | 82 | 71 | .536 | 10½ | 42‍–‍34 | 40‍–‍37 |
| Pittsburgh Pirates | 79 | 75 | .513 | 14 | 42‍–‍35 | 37‍–‍40 |
| St. Louis Cardinals | 75 | 79 | .487 | 18 | 38‍–‍38 | 37‍–‍41 |
| Chicago Cubs | 75 | 79 | .487 | 18 | 43‍–‍34 | 32‍–‍45 |
| Boston Braves | 62 | 90 | .408 | 30 | 36‍–‍37 | 26‍–‍53 |
| Philadelphia Phillies | 62 | 91 | .405 | 30½ | 32‍–‍45 | 30‍–‍46 |

=== Record vs. opponents ===
1920 National League record Sources:
| Team | BSN | BRO | CHC | CIN | NYG | PHI | PIT | STL |
|---|---|---|---|---|---|---|---|---|
| Boston | — | 8–14–1 | 7–15 | 9–12 | 10–12 | 10–11 | 7–15 | 11–11 |
| Brooklyn | 14–8–1 | — | 13–9 | 10–12 | 15–7 | 14–8 | 12–10 | 15–7 |
| Chicago | 15–7 | 9–13 | — | 9–13 | 7–15 | 14–8 | 11–11 | 10–12 |
| Cincinnati | 12–9 | 12–10 | 13–9 | — | 6–16–1 | 14–8 | 12–10 | 13–9 |
| New York | 12–10 | 7–15 | 15–7 | 16–6–1 | — | 12–10 | 13–9 | 11–11 |
| Philadelphia | 11–10 | 8–14 | 8–14 | 8–14 | 10–12 | — | 9–13 | 8–14 |
| Pittsburgh | 15–7 | 10–12 | 11–11 | 10–12 | 9–13 | 13–9 | — | 11–11–1 |
| St. Louis | 11–11 | 7–15 | 12–10 | 9–13 | 11–11 | 14–8 | 11–11–1 | — |

=== Roster ===
1920 St. Louis Cardinals
Roster
| Pitchers: Bill Doak; Bob Glenn; Marv Goodwin; Jesse Haines; Elmer Jacobs; Hal Kime; Mike Kircher; George Lyons; Jakie May; Lou North; Walt Schulz; Ferdie Schupp; George Scott; Bill Sherdel; Oscar Tuero | Catchers: Verne Clemons; Pickles Dillhoefer; George Gilham; Tim Griesenbeck; Lew McCarty; Bill Schindler; Infielders: Jack Fournier; Rogers Hornsby; Hal Janvrin; Doc Lavan; Milt Stock | Outfielders: Cliff Heathcote; Ed Hock; Mike Knode; Austin McHenry; Heinie Mueller; Joe Schultz; Burt Shotton; Jack Smith | Manager: Branch Rickey |

== Player stats ==
| = Indicates team leader |

| = Indicates league leader |

=== Batting ===
==== Starters by position ====
Note: Pos = Position; G = Games played; AB = At bats; H = Hits; Avg. = Batting average; HR = Home runs; RBI = Runs batted in

| Pos | Player | G | AB | H | Avg. | HR | RBI |
|---|---|---|---|---|---|---|---|
| C | Verne Clemons | 112 | 338 | 95 | .281 | 1 | 36 |
| 1B | Jack Fournier | 141 | 530 | 162 | .306 | 3 | 61 |
| 2B | Rogers Hornsby | 149 | 589 | 218 | .370 | 9 | 94 |
| SS | Doc Lavan | 142 | 516 | 149 | .289 | 1 | 63 |
| 3B | Milt Stock | 155 | 639 | 204 | .319 | 0 | 76 |
| OF | Cliff Heathcote | 133 | 489 | 139 | .284 | 3 | 56 |
| OF | Austin McHenry | 137 | 504 | 142 | .282 | 10 | 65 |
| OF | Joe Schultz | 99 | 320 | 84 | .263 | 0 | 32 |

==== Other batters ====
Note: G = Games played; AB = At bats; H = Hits; Avg. = Batting average; HR = Home runs; RBI = Runs batted in

| Player | G | AB | H | Avg. | HR | RBI |
|---|---|---|---|---|---|---|
| Jack Smith | 91 | 313 | 104 | .332 | 1 | 28 |
| Hal Janvrin | 87 | 270 | 74 | .274 | 1 | 28 |
| Pickles Dillhoefer | 76 | 224 | 59 | .263 | 0 | 13 |
| Burt Shotton | 62 | 180 | 41 | .228 | 1 | 12 |
| Mike Knode | 42 | 65 | 15 | .231 | 0 | 12 |
| Heinie Mueller | 4 | 22 | 7 | .318 | 0 | 1 |
| Lew McCarty | 5 | 7 | 2 | .286 | 0 | 0 |
| Tim Griesenbeck | 5 | 3 | 1 | .333 | 0 | 0 |
| George Gilham | 1 | 3 | 0 | .000 | 0 | 0 |
| Bill Schindler | 1 | 2 | 0 | .000 | 0 | 0 |
| Ed Hock | 1 | 0 | 0 | ---- | 0 | 0 |

=== Pitching ===
==== Starting pitchers ====
Note: G = Games pitched; IP = Innings pitched; W = Wins; L = Losses; ERA = Earned run average; SO = Strikeouts

| Player | G | IP | W | L | ERA | SO |
|---|---|---|---|---|---|---|
| Jesse Haines | 47 | 301.2 | 13 | 20 | 2.98 | 120 |
| Bill Doak | 39 | 270.0 | 20 | 12 | 2.53 | 90 |
| Ferdie Schupp | 38 | 250.2 | 16 | 13 | 3.52 | 119 |

==== Other pitchers ====
Note: G = Games pitched; IP = Innings pitched; W = Wins; L = Losses; ERA = Earned run average; SO = Strikeouts

| Player | G | IP | W | L | ERA | SO |
|---|---|---|---|---|---|---|
| Marv Goodwin | 32 | 116.1 | 3 | 8 | 4.95 | 23 |
| Lou North | 24 | 88.0 | 3 | 2 | 3.27 | 37 |
| Elmer Jacobs | 23 | 77.2 | 4 | 8 | 5.21 | 21 |
| Jakie May | 16 | 70.2 | 1 | 4 | 3.06 | 33 |
| Mike Kircher | 9 | 36.2 | 2 | 1 | 5.40 | 5 |
| George Lyons | 7 | 23.1 | 2 | 1 | 3.09 | 5 |

==== Relief pitchers ====
Note: G = Games pitched; W = Wins; L = Losses; SV = Saves; ERA = Earned run average; SO = Strikeouts

| Player | G | W | L | SV | ERA | SO |
|---|---|---|---|---|---|---|
| Bill Sherdel | 43 | 11 | 10 | 6 | 3.28 | 74 |
| Hal Kime | 4 | 0 | 0 | 0 | 2.57 | 1 |
| George Scott | 2 | 0 | 0 | 0 | 4.50 | 1 |
| Walt Schulz | 2 | 0 | 0 | 0 | 6.00 | 0 |
| Bob Glenn | 2 | 0 | 0 | 0 | 0.00 | 0 |
| Oscar Tuero | 2 | 0 | 0 | 0 | 54.00 | 0 |

== Farm system ==
- Class B: Houston Buffaloes (Texas League; Jewel Ens, manager)
- Class D: Fort Smith Twins (Western Association; Boss Schmidt, manager)
