= 1920 New York Giants season =

1920 New York Giants
- League: National League
- Ballpark: Polo Grounds
- City: New York City
- Record: 86–68 (.558)
- League place: 2nd
- Owners: Charles Stoneham
- Managers: John McGraw

The 1920 New York Giants season was the franchise's 38th season. The team finished in second place in the National League with an 86–68 record, seven games behind the Brooklyn Robins.

== Offseason ==
- February 1920: Fred Lear was purchased by the Giants from the Chicago Cubs.

== Regular season ==
=== Season standings ===
National League
| Team | W | L | Pct. | GB | Home | Road |
|---|---|---|---|---|---|---|
| Brooklyn Robins | 93 | 61 | .604 | — | 49‍–‍29 | 44‍–‍32 |
| New York Giants | 86 | 68 | .558 | 7 | 45‍–‍35 | 41‍–‍33 |
| Cincinnati Reds | 82 | 71 | .536 | 10½ | 42‍–‍34 | 40‍–‍37 |
| Pittsburgh Pirates | 79 | 75 | .513 | 14 | 42‍–‍35 | 37‍–‍40 |
| St. Louis Cardinals | 75 | 79 | .487 | 18 | 38‍–‍38 | 37‍–‍41 |
| Chicago Cubs | 75 | 79 | .487 | 18 | 43‍–‍34 | 32‍–‍45 |
| Boston Braves | 62 | 90 | .408 | 30 | 36‍–‍37 | 26‍–‍53 |
| Philadelphia Phillies | 62 | 91 | .405 | 30½ | 32‍–‍45 | 30‍–‍46 |

=== Record vs. opponents ===
1920 National League record Sources:
| Team | BSN | BRO | CHC | CIN | NYG | PHI | PIT | STL |
|---|---|---|---|---|---|---|---|---|
| Boston | — | 8–14–1 | 7–15 | 9–12 | 10–12 | 10–11 | 7–15 | 11–11 |
| Brooklyn | 14–8–1 | — | 13–9 | 10–12 | 15–7 | 14–8 | 12–10 | 15–7 |
| Chicago | 15–7 | 9–13 | — | 9–13 | 7–15 | 14–8 | 11–11 | 10–12 |
| Cincinnati | 12–9 | 12–10 | 13–9 | — | 6–16–1 | 14–8 | 12–10 | 13–9 |
| New York | 12–10 | 7–15 | 15–7 | 16–6–1 | — | 12–10 | 13–9 | 11–11 |
| Philadelphia | 11–10 | 8–14 | 8–14 | 8–14 | 10–12 | — | 9–13 | 8–14 |
| Pittsburgh | 15–7 | 10–12 | 11–11 | 10–12 | 9–13 | 13–9 | — | 11–11–1 |
| St. Louis | 11–11 | 7–15 | 12–10 | 9–13 | 11–11 | 14–8 | 11–11–1 | — |

=== Roster ===
1920 New York Giants
Roster
| Pitchers: Jesse Barnes; Virgil Barnes; Rube Benton; Claude Davenport; Phil Douglas; Tom Grubbs; Bill Hubbell; Art Nehf; Pol Perritt; Rosy Ryan; Slim Sallee; Fred Toney; Jesse Winters | Catchers: Alex Gaston; Mike González; Lew McCarty; Earl Smith; Frank Snyder; Infielders: Doug Baird; Dave Bancroft; Larry Doyle; Art Fletcher; Frankie Frisch; Roy Grimes; George Kelly; Fred Lear; Al Lefevre; Ed Sicking | Outfielders: Eddie Brown; George Burns; Pug Griffin; Benny Kauff; Lee King; Bob Kinsella; Vern Spencer; Jigger Statz; Curt Walker; Ross Youngs | Manager: John McGraw; Coaches: Johnny Evers; Christy Mathewson |

== Player stats ==
=== Batting ===
==== Starters by position ====
Note: Pos = Position; G = Games played; AB = At bats; H = Hits; Avg. = Batting average; HR = Home runs; RBI = Runs batted in

| Pos | Player | G | AB | H | Avg. | HR | RBI |
|---|---|---|---|---|---|---|---|
| C | Frank Snyder | 87 | 264 | 66 | .250 | 3 | 27 |
| 1B | George Kelly | 155 | 590 | 157 | .266 | 11 | 94 |
| 2B | Larry Doyle | 137 | 471 | 134 | .285 | 4 | 50 |
| SS | Dave Bancroft | 108 | 442 | 132 | .299 | 0 | 31 |
| 3B | Frankie Frisch | 110 | 440 | 123 | .280 | 4 | 77 |
| OF | Ross Youngs | 153 | 581 | 204 | .351 | 6 | 78 |
| OF | Lee King | 93 | 261 | 72 | .276 | 7 | 42 |
| OF | George Burns | 154 | 631 | 181 | .287 | 6 | 46 |

==== Other batters ====
Note: G = Games played; AB = At bats; H = Hits; Avg. = Batting average; HR = Home runs; RBI = Runs batted in

| Player | G | AB | H | Avg. | HR | RBI |
|---|---|---|---|---|---|---|
| Earl Smith | 91 | 262 | 77 | .294 | 1 | 30 |
| Art Fletcher | 41 | 171 | 44 | .257 | 0 | 24 |
| Benny Kauff | 55 | 157 | 43 | .274 | 3 | 26 |
| Vern Spencer | 45 | 140 | 28 | .200 | 0 | 19 |
| Ed Sicking | 46 | 134 | 23 | .172 | 0 | 9 |
| Fred Lear | 31 | 87 | 22 | .253 | 1 | 7 |
| Roy Grimes | 26 | 57 | 9 | .158 | 0 | 3 |
| Lew McCarty | 36 | 38 | 5 | .132 | 0 | 0 |
| Jigger Statz | 16 | 30 | 4 | .133 | 0 | 5 |
| Al Lefevre | 17 | 27 | 4 | .148 | 0 | 0 |
| Curt Walker | 8 | 14 | 1 | .071 | 0 | 0 |
| Mike González | 11 | 13 | 3 | .231 | 0 | 0 |
| Alex Gaston | 4 | 10 | 1 | .100 | 0 | 1 |
| Doug Baird | 7 | 8 | 1 | .125 | 0 | 0 |
| Eddie Brown | 3 | 8 | 1 | .125 | 0 | 0 |
| Pug Griffin | 5 | 4 | 1 | .250 | 0 | 0 |
| Bob Kinsella | 1 | 3 | 1 | .333 | 0 | 1 |

=== Pitching ===
==== Starting pitchers ====
Note: G = Games pitched; IP = Innings pitched; W = Wins; L = Losses; ERA = Earned run average; SO = Strikeouts

| Player | G | IP | W | L | ERA | SO |
|---|---|---|---|---|---|---|
| Jesse Barnes | 43 | 292.2 | 20 | 15 | 2.64 | 63 |
| Art Nehf | 40 | 280.2 | 21 | 12 | 3.08 | 79 |
| Fred Toney | 42 | 278.1 | 21 | 11 | 2.65 | 81 |
| Rube Benton | 33 | 193.1 | 9 | 16 | 3.03 | 52 |
| Virgil Barnes | 1 | 7.0 | 0 | 1 | 3.86 | 2 |
| Tom Grubbs | 1 | 5.0 | 0 | 1 | 7.20 | 0 |

==== Other pitchers ====
Note: G = Games pitched; IP = Innings pitched; W = Wins; L = Losses; ERA = Earned run average; SO = Strikeouts

| Player | G | IP | W | L | ERA | SO |
|---|---|---|---|---|---|---|
| Phil Douglas | 46 | 226.0 | 14 | 10 | 2.71 | 71 |
| Slim Sallee | 5 | 17.0 | 1 | 0 | 1.59 | 2 |
| Rosy Ryan | 3 | 15.1 | 0 | 1 | 1.76 | 5 |

==== Relief pitchers ====
Note: G = Games pitched; W = Wins; L = Losses; SV = Saves; ERA = Earned run average; SO = Strikeouts

| Player | G | W | L | SV | ERA | SO |
|---|---|---|---|---|---|---|
| Jesse Winters | 21 | 0 | 0 | 0 | 3.50 | 14 |
| Bill Hubbell | 14 | 0 | 1 | 2 | 2.10 | 8 |
| Pol Perritt | 8 | 0 | 0 | 2 | 1.80 | 3 |
| Claude Davenport | 1 | 0 | 0 | 0 | 4.50 | 0 |
