= 1920 Chicago Cubs season =

1920 Chicago Cubs
- League: National League
- Ballpark: Weeghman Park/Cubs Park
- City: Chicago
- Record: 75–79 (.487)
- League place: 5th
- Owners: Charles Weeghman
- Managers: Fred Mitchell

The 1920 Chicago Cubs season was the 49th season of the Chicago Cubs franchise, the 45th in the National League and the fifth at Wrigley Field (then known as "Weeghman/Cubs Park"). The Cubs finished sixth in the National League with a record of 75–79.

== Offseason ==
- February 1920: Fred Lear was purchased from the Cubs by the New York Giants.

== Regular season ==
=== Season standings ===
National League
Team	W	L	Pct.	GB	Home	Road
Brooklyn Robins	93	61	.604	—	49‍–‍29	44‍–‍32
New York Giants	86	68	.558	7	45‍–‍35	41‍–‍33
Cincinnati Reds	82	71	.536	10½	42‍–‍34	40‍–‍37
Pittsburgh Pirates	79	75	.513	14	42‍–‍35	37‍–‍40
St. Louis Cardinals	75	79	.487	18	38‍–‍38	37‍–‍41
Chicago Cubs	75	79	.487	18	43‍–‍34	32‍–‍45
Boston Braves	62	90	.408	30	36‍–‍37	26‍–‍53
Philadelphia Phillies	62	91	.405	30½	32‍–‍45	30‍–‍46

=== Record vs. opponents ===
1920 National League record Sources:
Team	BSN	BRO	CHC	CIN	NYG	PHI	PIT	STL
Boston	—	8–14–1	7–15	9–12	10–12	10–11	7–15	11–11
Brooklyn	14–8–1	—	13–9	10–12	15–7	14–8	12–10	15–7
Chicago	15–7	9–13	—	9–13	7–15	14–8	11–11	10–12
Cincinnati	12–9	12–10	13–9	—	6–16–1	14–8	12–10	13–9
New York	12–10	7–15	15–7	16–6–1	—	12–10	13–9	11–11
Philadelphia	11–10	8–14	8–14	8–14	10–12	—	9–13	8–14
Pittsburgh	15–7	10–12	11–11	10–12	9–13	13–9	—	11–11–1
St. Louis	11–11	7–15	12–10	9–13	11–11	14–8	11–11–1	—

== Roster ==
1920 Chicago Cubs
Roster
Pitchers: Pete Alexander; Sweetbread Bailey; Paul Carter; Virgil Cheeves; Chippy Gaw; Claude Hendrix; Joe Jaeger; Percy Jones; Speed Martin; Joel Newkirk; Ted Turner; Lefty Tyler; Hippo Vaughn	Catchers: Tom Daly; Bill Killefer; Bob O'Farrell; Infielders: Turner Barber; Sumpter Clarke; Charlie Deal; Bernie Friberg; Buck Herzog; Charlie Hollocher; Hal Leathers; William Marriott; Fred Merkle; Zeb Terry	Outfielders: Max Flack; Dode Paskert; Dave Robertson; Babe Twombly; Other batters: Bill McCabe	Manager: Fred Mitchell

== Player stats ==
= Indicates team leader

=== Batting ===
==== Starters by position ====
Note: Pos = Position; G = Games played; AB = At bats; H = Hits; Avg. = Batting average; HR = Home runs; RBI = Runs batted in

Pos	Player	G	AB	H	Avg.	HR	RBI
C	Bob O'Farrell	94	270	67	.248	3	19
1B	Fred Merkle	92	330	94	.285	3	38
2B	Zeb Terry	133	496	139	.280	0	52
SS	Charlie Hollocher	80	301	96	.319	0	22
3B	Charlie Deal	129	450	108	.240	3	39
OF	Dode Paskert	139	487	136	.279	5	71
OF	Max Flack	135	520	157	.302	4	49
OF	Dave Robertson	134	500	150	.300	10	75

==== Other batters ====
Note: G = Games played; AB = At bats; H = Hits; Avg. = Batting average; HR = Home runs; RBI = Runs batted in

Player	G	AB	H	Avg.	HR	RBI
Turner Barber	94	340	90	.265	0	50
Buck Herzog	91	305	59	.193	0	19
Bill Killefer	62	191	42	.220	0	16
Babe Twombly	78	183	43	.235	2	14
Bernie Friberg	50	114	24	.211	0	7
Tom Daly	44	90	28	.311	0	13
William Marriott	14	43	12	.279	0	5
Hal Leathers	9	23	7	.304	1	0(a)
Sumpter Clarke	1	3	1	.333	0	0
Bill McCabe	3	2	1	.500	0	0

(a) Not credited with an RBI for his home run, according to Baseball Reference and Retrosheet.

=== Pitching ===
= Indicates league leader

==== Starting pitchers ====
Note: G = Games pitched; IP = Innings pitched; W = Wins; L = Losses; ERA = Earned run average; SO = Strikeouts

Player	G	IP	W	L	ERA	SO
Pete Alexander	46	363.1	27	14	1.91	173
Hippo Vaughn	40	301.0	19	16	2.54	131
Claude Hendrix	27	203.2	9	12	3.58	72
Lefty Tyler	27	193.0	11	12	3.31	57

==== Other pitchers ====
Note: G = Games pitched; IP = Innings pitched; W = Wins; L = Losses; ERA = Earned run average; SO = Strikeouts

Player	G	IP	W	L	ERA	SO
Speed Martin	35	136.0	4	15	4.83	44
Paul Carter	31	106.0	3	6	4.67	14
Virgil Cheeves	5	18.0	0	0	3.50	3
Chippy Gaw	6	13.0	1	1	4.85	4
Joel Newkirk	2	6.2	0	1	5.40	2

==== Relief pitchers ====
Note: G = Games pitched; W = Wins; L = Losses; SV = Saves; ERA = Earned run average; SO = Strikeouts

Player	G	W	L	SV	ERA	SO
Sweetbreads Bailey	21	1	2	0	7.12	8
Percy Jones	4	0	0	0	11.57	0
Joe Jaeger	2	0	0	0	12.00	0
Ted Turner	1	0	0	0	13.50	0
