= 1920 Pittsburgh Pirates season =

1920 Pittsburgh Pirates
- League: National League
- Ballpark: Forbes Field
- City: Pittsburgh, Pennsylvania
- Owners: Barney Dreyfuss
- Managers: George Gibson

The 1920 Pittsburgh Pirates season was the 39th in franchise history; the 34th in the National League.

== Regular season ==
- Pirates pitcher Babe Adams had outstanding control, allowing only 18 bases on balls in 263 innings pitched.
- October 2, 1920: The Cincinnati Reds and the Pirates played in the last tripleheader to date and the only one in the modern World Series era (post-1903). Umpire Peter Harrison officiated all three games.

=== Season standings ===
National League
Team	W	L	Pct.	GB	Home	Road
Brooklyn Robins	93	61	.604	—	49‍–‍29	44‍–‍32
New York Giants	86	68	.558	7	45‍–‍35	41‍–‍33
Cincinnati Reds	82	71	.536	10½	42‍–‍34	40‍–‍37
Pittsburgh Pirates	79	75	.513	14	42‍–‍35	37‍–‍40
St. Louis Cardinals	75	79	.487	18	38‍–‍38	37‍–‍41
Chicago Cubs	75	79	.487	18	43‍–‍34	32‍–‍45
Boston Braves	62	90	.408	30	36‍–‍37	26‍–‍53
Philadelphia Phillies	62	91	.405	30½	32‍–‍45	30‍–‍46

=== Record vs. opponents ===
1920 National League record Sources:
Team	BSN	BRO	CHC	CIN	NYG	PHI	PIT	STL
Boston	—	8–14–1	7–15	9–12	10–12	10–11	7–15	11–11
Brooklyn	14–8–1	—	13–9	10–12	15–7	14–8	12–10	15–7
Chicago	15–7	9–13	—	9–13	7–15	14–8	11–11	10–12
Cincinnati	12–9	12–10	13–9	—	6–16–1	14–8	12–10	13–9
New York	12–10	7–15	15–7	16–6–1	—	12–10	13–9	11–11
Philadelphia	11–10	8–14	8–14	8–14	10–12	—	9–13	8–14
Pittsburgh	15–7	10–12	11–11	10–12	9–13	13–9	—	11–11–1
St. Louis	11–11	7–15	12–10	9–13	11–11	14–8	11–11–1	—

=== Game log ===
1920 Game Log: 79–75 (Home: 42–35; Away: 37–40)
April: 6–5 (Home: 0–3; Away: 6–2)

#	Date	Opponent	Score	Win	Loss	Save	Attendance	Record
1	April 14	@ Cardinals	5–4 (10)	**Adams** (1–0)	Goodwin	**Hamilton** (1)	—	1–0
2	April 15	@ Cardinals	2–3	Schupp	**Cooper** (0–1)	—	—	1–1
3	April 16	@ Cardinals	5–0	**Carlson** (1–0)	Sherdel	—	—	2–1
4	April 17	@ Cardinals	3–0 (13)	**Ponder** (1–0)	Haines	—	—	3–1
5	April 18	@ Reds	2–1	**Adams** (2–0)	Ruether	—	—	4–1
6	April 21	@ Reds	5–3	**Cooper** (1–1)	Ring	—	—	5–1
7	April 23	Cardinals	7–9	Jacobs	**Hamilton** (0–1)	—	—	5–2
8	April 24	Cardinals	0–6	Doak	**Ponder** (1–1)	—	—	5–3
9	April 25	@ Cubs	4–1 (15)	**Adams** (3–0)	Hendrix	—	—	6–3
10	April 28	@ Cubs	1–11	Alexander	**Cooper** (1–2)	—	—	6–4
11	April 29	Reds	2–8	Ring	**Carlson** (1–1)	—	—	6–5

May: 13–12 (Home: 11–8; Away: 2–4)

#	Date	Opponent	Score	Win	Loss	Save	Attendance	Record
12	May 1	Reds	1–7	Ruether	**Adams** (3–1)	—	—	6–6
13	May 2	@ Reds	3–0	**Cooper** (2–2)	Sallee	—	—	7–6
14	May 5	Cubs	2–0	**Adams** (4–1)	Martin	—	—	8–6
15	May 6	Cubs	3–1	**Cooper** (3–2)	Hendrix	—	—	9–6
16	May 7	Cubs	4–6	Alexander	**Carlson** (1–2)	—	—	9–7
17	May 8	Cubs	1–4	Vaughn	**Hamilton** (0–2)	—	—	9–8
18	May 9	@ Cubs	7–8	Martin	**Adams** (4–2)	Carter	—	9–9
19	May 10	Phillies	3–1	**Cooper** (4–2)	Causey	—	—	10–9
20	May 12	Phillies	5–3	**Hamilton** (1–2)	Rixey	—	—	11–9
21	May 15	Giants	0–2	Nehf	**Adams** (4–3)	—	12,000	11–10
22	May 17	Giants	7–6 (15)	**Ponder** (2–1)	Douglas	—	6,000	12–10
23	May 18	Braves	7–2	**Hamilton** (2–2)	Oeschger	—	—	13–10
24	May 19	Braves	2–1	**Cooper** (5–2)	McQuillan	—	—	14–10
25	May 20	Braves	5–1	**Adams** (5–3)	Fillingim	—	—	15–10
26	May 21	Braves	9–0	**Carlson** (2–2)	Eayrs	—	—	16–10
27	May 22	Robins	1–4	Grimes	**Cooper** (5–3)	—	18,000	16–11
28	May 23	@ Robins	1–0	**Ponder** (3–1)	Pfeffer	—	10,000	17–11
29	May 24	Robins	0–1	Mamaux	**Adams** (5–4)	—	2,500	17–12
30	May 25	Robins	2–0	**Carlson** (3–2)	Cadore	—	3,000	18–12
31	May 26	Robins	2–3	Grimes	**Wisner** (0–1)	—	—	18–13
32	May 28	@ Reds	1–6	Ruether	**Cooper** (5–4)	—	—	18–14
33	May 29	@ Reds	2–3	Luque	**Carlson** (3–3)	—	—	18–15
34	May 30	@ Reds	3–5	Sallee	**Wisner** (0–2)	—	—	18–16
35	May 31	Cardinals	4–5	Sherdel	**Ponder** (3–2)	Jacobs	—	18–17
36	May 31	Cardinals	7–4	**Cooper** (6–4)	Doak	**Carlson** (1)	—	19–17

June: 10–13 (Home: 2–2; Away: 8–11)

#	Date	Opponent	Score	Win	Loss	Save	Attendance	Record
37	June 1	Cardinals	4–5 (15)	Haines	**Ponder** (3–3)	—	—	19–18
38	June 2	Cardinals	2–6	Schupp	**Carlson** (3–4)	—	—	19–19
39	June 6	@ Reds	3–1 (10)	**Cooper** (7–4)	Ruether	—	—	20–19
40	June 9	@ Braves	6–7 (10)	Fillingim	**Adams** (5–5)	—	—	20–20
41	June 10	@ Braves	1–2	Scott	**Cooper** (7–5)	—	—	20–21
42	June 11	@ Braves	0–3	Fillingim	**Hamilton** (2–3)	—	—	20–22
43	June 12	@ Phillies	6–4	**Carlson** (4–4)	Rixey	—	4,000	21–22
44	June 14	@ Phillies	6–1	**Cooper** (8–5)	Gallia	—	—	22–22
45	June 15	@ Phillies	7–6 (10)	**Ponder** (4–3)	Causey	—	—	23–22
46	June 18	@ Giants	4–5	Barnes	**Cooper** (8–6)	—	1,000	23–23
47	June 19	@ Giants	3–0	**Adams** (6–5)	Nehf	—	15,000	24–23
48	June 20	@ Giants	0–8	Douglas	**Carlson** (4–5)	—	23,000	24–24
49	June 22	@ Robins	9–7	**Cooper** (9–6)	Pfeffer	—	5,000	25–24
50	June 23	@ Robins	2–5	Marquard	**Carlson** (4–6)	—	—	25–25
51	June 24	@ Robins	2–6	Mamaux	**Adams** (6–6)	—	3,500	25–26
52	June 25	Cubs	6–3	**Cooper** (10–6)	Hendrix	—	—	26–26
53	June 26	Cubs	9–4	**Ponder** (5–3)	Vaughn	—	—	27–26
54	June 27	@ Cubs	8–3	**Carlson** (5–6)	Alexander	**Cooper** (1)	—	28–26
55	June 28	@ Cubs	2–5	Tyler	**Adams** (6–7)	—	—	28–27
56	June 28	@ Cubs	4–5	Gaw	**Ponder** (5–4)	—	—	28–28
57	June 29	@ Cubs	4–3 (11)	**Cooper** (11–6)	Martin	—	—	29–28
58	June 29	@ Cubs	3–14	Hendrix	**Meador** (0–1)	—	—	29–29
59	June 30	@ Cubs	0–1	Vaughn	**Ponder** (5–5)	—	—	29–30

July: 18–15 (Home: 12–8; Away: 6–7)

#	Date	Opponent	Score	Win	Loss	Save	Attendance	Record
60	July 1	@ Cardinals	6–2 (10)	**Carlson** (6–6)	Sherdel	**Adams** (1)	—	30–30
61	July 2	@ Cardinals	0–3	Doak	**Hamilton** (2–4)	—	—	30–31
62	July 3	@ Cardinals	3–1	**Cooper** (12–6)	Goodwin	—	—	31–31
63	July 4	@ Reds	0–5	Ruether	**Adams** (6–8)	—	—	31–32
64	July 5	Reds	4–1	**Carlson** (7–6)	Fisher	—	—	32–32
65	July 5	Reds	6–5 (11)	**Hamilton** (3–4)	Luque	—	—	33–32
66	July 6	Reds	2–7	Ring	**Meador** (0–2)	—	—	33–33
67	July 7	Phillies	2–1	**Cooper** (13–6)	Smith	—	—	34–33
68	July 8	Phillies	1–0	**Adams** (7–8)	Meadows	—	—	35–33
69	July 9	Phillies	1–4	Rixey	**Carlson** (7–7)	—	—	35–34
70	July 10	Phillies	7–8 (11)	Meadows	**Cooper** (13–7)	—	—	35–35
71	July 10	Phillies	1–3	Hubbell	**Ponder** (5–6)	—	—	35–36
72	July 12	Braves	3–2 (11)	**Adams** (8–8)	Fillingim	—	—	36–36
73	July 13	Braves	5–2	**Carlson** (8–7)	Scott	—	—	37–36
74	July 14	Braves	4–3	**Cooper** (14–7)	Oeschger	—	—	38–36
75	July 15	Braves	9–8	**Carlson** (9–7)	Watson	—	—	39–36
76	July 16	Giants	0–7 (17)	Benton	**Hamilton** (3–5)	—	4,000	39–37
77	July 17	Giants	2–0	**Adams** (9–8)	Toney	—	—	40–37
78	July 17	Giants	2–4	Barnes	**Carlson** (9–8)	—	25,000	40–38
79	July 20	Giants	2–5	Nehf	**Cooper** (14–8)	—	3,000	40–39
80	July 21	Robins	4–3	**Ponder** (6–6)	Marquard	—	3,800	41–39
81	July 22	Robins	5–2	**Carlson** (10–8)	Cadore	—	4,000	42–39
82	July 23	Robins	5–6	Smith	**Adams** (9–9)	—	4,000	42–40
83	July 24	Robins	5–1	**Cooper** (15–8)	Grimes	—	15,000	43–40
84	July 25	@ Robins	5–4	**Ponder** (7–6)	Mitchell	—	22,000	44–40
85	July 26	@ Robins	4–6	Smith	**Carlson** (10–9)	—	—	44–41
86	July 27	@ Phillies	7–1	**Hamilton** (4–5)	Meadows	—	—	45–41
87	July 28	@ Phillies	6–3	**Cooper** (16–8)	Smith	—	—	46–41
88	July 28	@ Phillies	4–5	Causey	**Adams** (9–10)	Gallia	—	46–42
89	July 29	@ Phillies	3–7	Rixey	**Ponder** (7–7)	—	—	46–43
90	July 30	@ Phillies	2–7	Hubbell	**Carlson** (10–10)	—	—	46–44
91	July 31	@ Braves	4–2	**Cooper** (17–8)	Rudolph	—	—	47–44
92	July 31	@ Braves	1–6	Fillingim	**Hamilton** (4–6)	—	—	47–45

August: 16–13 (Home: 7–8; Away: 9–5)

#	Date	Opponent	Score	Win	Loss	Save	Attendance	Record
93	August 2	@ Braves	3–2	**Adams** (10–10)	Oeschger	**Carlson** (2)	—	48–45
94	August 3	@ Braves	3–2	**Ponder** (8–7)	McQuillan	—	—	49–45
95	August 4	@ Braves	3–0	**Cooper** (18–8)	Fillingim	—	—	50–45
96	August 5	@ Robins	8–5 (10)	**Hamilton** (5–6)	Grimes	—	7,000	51–45
97	August 7	@ Robins	7–0	**Adams** (11–10)	Smith	—	12,000	52–45
98	August 8	@ Robins	1–2	Cadore	**Ponder** (8–8)	—	20,000	52–46
99	August 9	@ Giants	0–9	Nehf	**Cooper** (18–9)	—	12,000	52–47
100	August 11	@ Giants	1–5	Benton	**Hamilton** (5–7)	—	—	52–48
101	August 11	@ Giants	3–6	Douglas	**Carlson** (10–11)	—	20,000	52–49
102	August 12	@ Giants	2–0	**Adams** (12–10)	Barnes	—	15,000	53–49
103	August 13	Cardinals	2–4	Schupp	**Cooper** (18–10)	—	—	53–50
104	August 14	Cardinals	0–1	Doak	**Ponder** (8–9)	—	—	53–51
105	August 14	Cardinals	1–1 (8)			—	—	53–51
106	August 15	@ Cardinals	4–2 (11)	**Hamilton** (6–7)	May	—	—	54–51
107	August 15	@ Cardinals	2–3	Kircher	**Wisner** (0–3)	—	—	54–52
108	August 16	@ Cardinals	3–2	**Adams** (13–10)	Haines	—	—	55–52
109	August 17	@ Cardinals	10–6	**Cooper** (19–10)	Schupp	**Carlson** (3)	—	56–52
110	August 19	Phillies	2–5 (12)	Enzmann	**Hamilton** (6–8)	—	—	56–53
111	August 20	Phillies	2–4 (11)	Betts	**Ponder** (8–10)	—	—	56–54
112	August 21	Phillies	1–3	Rixey	**Cooper** (19–11)	—	—	56–55
113	August 21	Phillies	5–0	**Adams** (14–10)	Hubbell	—	—	57–55
114	August 23	Robins	0–3	Pfeffer	**Hamilton** (6–9)	—	3,500	57–56
115	August 24	Robins	4–3	**Carlson** (11–11)	Grimes	—	3,000	58–56
116	August 25	Robins	3–4	Mamaux	**Ponder** (8–11)	—	4,000	58–57
117	August 26	Braves	2–1	**Adams** (15–10)	McQuillan	—	—	59–57
118	August 27	Braves	8–1	**Cooper** (20–11)	Oeschger	—	—	60–57
119	August 28	Braves	1–5	Fillingim	**Hamilton** (6–10)	—	—	60–58
120	August 30	Giants	4–2	**Carlson** (12–11)	Douglas	—	—	61–58
121	August 30	Giants	2–1	**Ponder** (9–11)	Toney	—	5,000	62–58
122	August 31	Giants	6–5	**Wisner** (1–3)	Nehf	**Hamilton** (2)	—	63–58

September: 14–15 (Home: 9–4; Away: 5–11)

#	Date	Opponent	Score	Win	Loss	Save	Attendance	Record
123	September 1	Giants	4–3	**Cooper** (21–11)	Benton	—	—	64–58
124	September 2	Giants	1–5	Barnes	**Hamilton** (6–11)	—	5,000	64–59
125	September 3	Cubs	2–4 (13)	Vaughn	**Carlson** (12–12)	—	—	64–60
126	September 4	Cubs	3–2	**Adams** (16–10)	Tyler	**Cooper** (2)	—	65–60
127	September 5	@ Cubs	0–2	Alexander	**Ponder** (9–12)	—	—	65–61
128	September 6	Cubs	2–5	Martin	**Cooper** (21–12)	—	—	65–62
129	September 6	Cubs	12–1	**Hamilton** (7–11)	Bailey	—	—	66–62
130	September 7	Cubs	7–4	**Carlson** (13–12)	Vaughn	**Adams** (2)	—	67–62
131	September 9	@ Phillies	7–6	**Ponder** (10–12)	Causey	**Hamilton** (3)	—	68–62
132	September 10	@ Phillies	8–3	**Cooper** (22–12)	Hubbell	—	—	69–62
133	September 11	@ Phillies	3–2	**Hamilton** (8–11)	Meadows	—	—	70–62
134	September 13	@ Braves	0–3	Scott	**Adams** (16–11)	—	—	70–63
135	September 15	@ Braves	2–1	**Cooper** (23–12)	McQuillan	—	—	71–63
136	September 15	@ Braves	1–4	Fillingim	**Carlson** (13–13)	—	—	71–64
137	September 16	@ Giants	3–1	**Hamilton** (9–11)	Barnes	—	—	72–64
138	September 16	@ Giants	0–4	Nehf	**Ponder** (10–13)	—	10,000	72–65
139	September 17	@ Giants	3–4 (10)	Toney	**Adams** (16–12)	—	6,000	72–66
140	September 18	@ Giants	7–8	Douglas	**Ponder** (10–14)	—	12,000	72–67
141	September 19	@ Robins	3–4	Pfeffer	**Cooper** (23–13)	—	25,000	72–68
142	September 20	@ Robins	1–2 (10)	Mamaux	**Hamilton** (9–12)	—	6,000	72–69
143	September 22	Reds	2–0	**Adams** (17–12)	Luque	—	—	73–69
144	September 22	Reds	3–1	**Ponder** (11–14)	Ruether	—	—	74–69
145	September 23	Reds	4–0	**Cooper** (24–13)	Eller	—	—	75–69
146	September 24	Cardinals	12–7	**Hamilton** (10–12)	Schupp	—	—	76–69
147	September 25	Cardinals	2–1 (12)	**Zinn** (1–0)	Sherdel	—	—	77–69
148	September 25	Cardinals	1–3	Haines	**Ponder** (11–15)	—	—	77–70
149	September 26	@ Reds	0–8	Napier	**Adams** (17–13)	—	—	77–71
150	September 28	@ Reds	0–2	Eller	**Cooper** (24–14)	—	—	77–72
151	September 28	@ Reds	3–5	Brenton	**Hamilton** (10–13)	—	—	77–73

October: 2–2 (Home: 1–2; Away: 1–0)

#	Date	Opponent	Score	Win	Loss	Save	Attendance	Record
152	October 2	Reds	4–13	Fisher	**Cooper** (24–15)	—	—	77–74
153	October 2	Reds	3–7	Brenton	**Zinn** (1–1)	—	—	77–75
154	October 2	Reds	6–0 (6)	**Morrison** (1–0)	Napier	—	—	78–75
155	October 3	@ Cubs	4–3	**Carlson** (14–13)	Tyler	—	—	79–75

Legend: = Win = Loss = Tie
Bold = Pirates team member

=== Roster ===
1920 Pittsburgh Pirates
**Roster**
**Pitchers**: Babe Adams; Sheriff Blake; Hal Carlson; Wilbur Cooper; Whitey Glazner; Earl Hamilton; Johnny Meador; Johnny Morrison; Elmer Ponder; Mule Watson; Jack Wisner; Jimmy Zinn	**Catchers**: Nig Clarke; Bill Haeffner; Cliff Lee; Walter Schmidt; **Infielders**: Walter Barbare; Clyde Barnhart; Howdy Caton; George Cutshaw; Charlie Grimm; Bill McKechnie; Cotton Tierney; Pie Traynor; Possum Whitted	**Outfielders**: Carson Bigbee; Max Carey; Fred Nicholson; Billy Southworth; Homer Summa; **Other batters**: Bill Hinchman; Wally Hood	**Manager**: George Gibson

== Player stats ==
=== Batting ===
==== Starters by position ====
Note: Pos = Position; G = Games played; AB = At bats; H = Hits; Avg. = Batting average; HR = Home runs; RBI = Runs batted in

Pos	Player	G	AB	H	Avg.	HR	RBI
C	Walter Schmidt	94	310	86	.277	0	20
1B	Charlie Grimm	148	533	121	.227	2	54
2B	George Cutshaw	131	488	123	.252	0	47
SS	Howdy Caton	98	352	83	.236	0	27
3B	Possum Whitted	134	494	129	.261	1	74
OF	Billy Southworth	146	546	155	.284	2	53
OF	Carson Bigbee	137	550	154	.280	4	32
OF	Max Carey	130	485	140	.289	1	35

==== Other batters ====
Note: G = Games played; AB = At bats; H = Hits; Avg. = Batting average; HR = Home runs; RBI = Runs batted in

Player	G	AB	H	Avg.	HR	RBI
Fred Nicholson	99	247	89	.360	4	30
Walter Barbare	57	186	51	.274	0	12
Bill Haeffner	54	175	34	.194	0	14
Bill McKechnie	40	133	29	.218	1	13
Cliff Lee	37	76	18	.237	0	8
Pie Traynor	17	52	11	.212	0	2
Cotton Tierney	12	46	11	.239	0	8
Clyde Barnhart	12	46	15	.326	0	5
Homer Summa	10	22	7	.318	0	1
Bill Hinchman	18	16	3	.188	0	1
Nig Clarke	3	7	0	.000	0	0
Wally Hood	2	1	0	.000	0	0

=== Pitching ===
==== Starting pitchers ====
Note: G = Games pitched; IP = Innings pitched; W = Wins; L = Losses; ERA = Earned run average; SO = Strikeouts

Player	G	IP	W	L	ERA	SO
Wilbur Cooper	44	327.0	24	15	2.39	114
Babe Adams	35	263.0	17	13	2.16	84
Hal Carlson	39	246.2	14	13	3.36	62
Elmer Ponder	33	196.0	11	15	2.62	62

==== Other pitchers ====
Note: G = Games pitched; IP = Innings pitched; W = Wins; L = Losses; ERA = Earned run average; SO = Strikeouts

Player	G	IP	W	L	ERA	SO
Earl Hamilton	39	230.1	10	13	3.24	74
Johnny Meador	12	36.1	0	2	4.21	5
Jimmy Zinn	6	31.0	1	1	3.48	18
Johnny Morrison	2	7.0	1	0	0.00	3

==== Relief pitchers ====
Note: G = Games pitched; W = Wins; L = Losses; SV = Saves; ERA = Earned run average; SO = Strikeouts

Player	G	W	L	SV	ERA	SO
Jack Wisner	17	1	3	0	3.43	13
Sheriff Blake	6	0	0	0	8.10	7
Mule Watson	5	0	0	0	8.74	1
Whitey Glazner	2	0	0	0	3.12	1

== Farm system ==
Level	Team	League	Manager
B	Wichita Falls Spudders	Texas League	Walter Salm
