= Hal Leathers =

American baseball player (1898–1977)

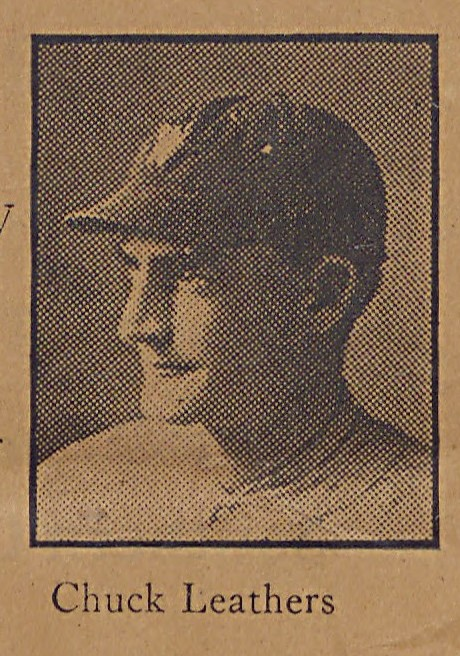
- Leathers in the minor leagues, 1923
- Shortstop / Second baseman
- Born: December 2, 1898; Selma, California, US
- Died: April 12, 1977 (aged 78); Modesto, California, US
- Batted: Left (Note: Leathers was listed as a switch hitter in the Cubs' 1921 pre-season roster.) Threw: Right

MLB debut
- September 13, 1920, for the Chicago Cubs

Last MLB appearance
- October 2, 1920, for the Chicago Cubs

Career statistics
- Batting average: .304
- Home runs: 1
- Runs batted in: 0 (Note: Somehow, official baseball records of the era do not credit him with a run batted in (RBI) for his home run, creating a discrepancy in his MLB career record. For an overview of discrepancies in historical baseball records, see this discussion at Retrosheet.)
- Stats at Baseball Reference

Teams
- Chicago Cubs (1920)

Harold Langford Leathers (December 2, 1898 – April 12, 1977) was an American professional baseball middle infielder who played in nine games for the 1920 Chicago Cubs of Major League Baseball (MLB). Listed at 5 feet 8 inches (1.73 m) and 152 pounds (69 kg), he batted left-handed and threw right-handed.

== Biography ==
Leathers' minor league baseball career spanned 1918 to 1924, plus a final season in 1926. He appeared in 778 minor league games, compiling a .253 batting average. Defensively, he played 480 games as a shortstop and 142 games as a second baseman.

From mid-September to early October 1920, Leathers appeared in nine major league games with the Chicago Cubs. He registered a .304 batting average (7-for-23) with one home run, which was hit off of Joe Oeschger of the Boston Braves. Defensively, Leathers made six appearances at shortstop (four starts) and three appearances at second base, recording an .837 fielding percentage. He committed three errors in his first major league start at shortstop, one of which led to an unearned run, the difference in a 1–0 Cubs loss to the Brooklyn Robins.

Leathers was born in 1898 in Selma, California. As of February 1942, he was living in Los Angeles and was self-employed as a gardener. He died in 1977 in Modesto, California, and was interred in Hughson, California.
