= Tim Griesenbeck =

American baseball player (1897–1953)

- Catcher
- Born: December 10, 1897; San Antonio, Texas, U.S.
- Died: March 25, 1953 (aged 55); San Antonio, Texas, U.S.
- Batted: Right Threw: Right

MLB debut
- September 11, 1920, for the St. Louis Cardinals

Last MLB appearance
- September 24, 1920, for the St. Louis Cardinals

MLB statistics
- Games played: 5
- At bats: 3
- Hits: 1
- Stats at Baseball Reference

Teams
- St. Louis Cardinals (1920)

Carlos Phillipe "Tim" Griesenbeck (December 10, 1897 – March 25, 1953) was an American Major League Baseball catcher who played for the St. Louis Cardinals in 1920. Griesenbeck attended the Agricultural and Mechanical College of Texas—now known as Texas A&M University, where he lettered in baseball and football. He served as the head football and basketball coach at St. Mary's University, located in San Antonio, Texas, for one season, in 1927.

== Basketball ==
Record table
Season	Team	Overall	Conference	Standing	Postseason
St. Mary’s (TX) (Independent) (1927)
1927–28	St. Mary’s	9–10			
Total:					
