= Mike Kircher =

American baseball player (1897-1972)

- Pitcher
- Born: September 30, 1897; Rochester, New York
- Died: June 26, 1972 (aged 74); Rochester, New York
- Batted: Right Threw: Right

MLB debut
- August 8, 1919, for the Philadelphia Athletics

Last MLB appearance
- April 18, 1921, for the St. Louis Cardinals

Career statistics
- Win–loss record: 2-2
- Earned run average: 6.00
- Stats at Baseball Reference

Teams
- Philadelphia Athletics (1919); St. Louis Cardinals (1920-1921)

Michael Andrew Kircher (September 30, 1897 – June 26, 1972) was an American Major League Baseball pitcher. He played for the Philadelphia Athletics during the 1919 season and the St. Louis Cardinals during the 1920 and 1921 seasons.
