= 1920 Philadelphia Phillies season =

Major League Baseball season

1920 Philadelphia Phillies
- League: National League
- Ballpark: Baker Bowl
- City: Philadelphia
- Owners: William F. Baker
- Managers: Gavvy Cravath

The following lists the events of the 1920 Philadelphia Phillies season.

== Offseason ==
- January 12, 1920: Mack Wheat was purchased by the Phillies from the Brooklyn Robins.

The Phillies introduced new uniforms in March 1920. The Philadelphia Inquirer reported "the new uniforms at home will be white blouses and pants, with gray stockings. A band of white will protrude about an inch above the shoe. The caps will be gray with black cords running from the peak button. On the road, the uniform will be all gray, with all white stockings."

== Regular season ==
=== Season standings ===
National League
Team	W	L	Pct.	GB	Home	Road
Brooklyn Robins	93	61	.604	—	49‍–‍29	44‍–‍32
New York Giants	86	68	.558	7	45‍–‍35	41‍–‍33
Cincinnati Reds	82	71	.536	10½	42‍–‍34	40‍–‍37
Pittsburgh Pirates	79	75	.513	14	42‍–‍35	37‍–‍40
St. Louis Cardinals	75	79	.487	18	38‍–‍38	37‍–‍41
Chicago Cubs	75	79	.487	18	43‍–‍34	32‍–‍45
Boston Braves	62	90	.408	30	36‍–‍37	26‍–‍53
Philadelphia Phillies	62	91	.405	30½	32‍–‍45	30‍–‍46

=== Record vs. opponents ===
1920 National League record Sources:
Team	BSN	BRO	CHC	CIN	NYG	PHI	PIT	STL
Boston	—	8–14–1	7–15	9–12	10–12	10–11	7–15	11–11
Brooklyn	14–8–1	—	13–9	10–12	15–7	14–8	12–10	15–7
Chicago	15–7	9–13	—	9–13	7–15	14–8	11–11	10–12
Cincinnati	12–9	12–10	13–9	—	6–16–1	14–8	12–10	13–9
New York	12–10	7–15	15–7	16–6–1	—	12–10	13–9	11–11
Philadelphia	11–10	8–14	8–14	8–14	10–12	—	9–13	8–14
Pittsburgh	15–7	10–12	11–11	10–12	9–13	13–9	—	11–11–1
St. Louis	11–11	7–15	12–10	9–13	11–11	14–8	11–11–1	—

=== Roster ===
1920 Philadelphia Phillies
Roster
Pitchers: Huck Betts; Mike Cantwell; Red Causey; Johnny Enzmann; Bert Gallia; Bill Hubbell; Jimmie Keenan; Lee Meadows; Eppa Rixey; George Smith; Lefty Weinert	Catchers: Walt Tragesser; Mack Wheat; Frank Withrow; Infielders: Dave Bancroft; Art Fletcher; Fred Luderus; Dots Miller; Ralph Miller; Gene Paulette; Johnny Rawlings; Russ Wrightstone	Outfielders: Gavvy Cravath; Bevo LeBourveau; Irish Meusel; Casey Stengel; Cy Williams; Pinch runner: Walt Walsh	Manager: Gavvy Cravath; Coaches: Jesse Tannehill

== Player stats ==
=== Batting ===
==== Starters by position ====
Note: Pos = Position; G = Games played; AB = At bats; H = Hits; Avg. = Batting average; HR = Home runs; RBI = Runs batted in

Pos	Player	G	AB	H	Avg.	HR	RBI
C	Mack Wheat	78	230	52	.226	3	20
1B	Gene Paulette	143	562	162	.288	1	36
2B	Johnny Rawlings	98	384	90	.234	3	30
SS	Art Fletcher	102	379	112	.296	4	38
3B	Ralph Miller	97	338	74	.219	0	28
OF	Casey Stengel	129	445	130	.292	9	50
OF	Irish Meusel	138	518	160	.309	14	69
OF	Cy Williams	148	590	192	.325	15	72

==== Other batters ====
Note: G = Games played; AB = At bats; H = Hits; Avg. = Batting average; HR = Home runs; RBI = Runs batted in

Player	G	AB	H	Avg.	HR	RBI
Dots Miller	98	343	87	254	1	27
Bevo LeBourveau	84	261	67	.257	3	12
Russ Wrightstone	76	206	54	.262	3	17
Walt Tragesser	62	176	37	.210	6	26
Dave Bancroft	42	171	51	.298	0	5
Frank Withrow	48	132	24	.182	0	12
Gavvy Cravath	46	45	13	.289	1	11
Fred Luderus	16	32	5	.156	0	4
Walt Walsh	2	0	0	----	0	0

=== Pitching ===
==== Starting pitchers ====
Note: G = Games pitched; IP = Innings pitched; W = Wins; L = Losses; ERA = Earned run average; SO = Strikeouts

Player	G	IP	W	L	ERA	SO
Eppa Rixey	41	284.1	11	22	3.48	109
George Smith	43	250.2	13	18	3.45	51
Lee Meadows	35	247.0	16	14	2.84	95
Red Causey	35	181.1	7	14	4.32	30
Bill Hubbell	24	150.0	9	9	3.84	26

==== Other pitchers ====
Note: G = Games pitched; IP = Innings pitched; W = Wins; L = Losses; ERA = Earned run average; SO = Strikeouts

Player	G	IP	W	L	ERA	SO
Bert Gallia	18	72.0	2	6	4.50	35
Mike Cantwell	5	23.1	0	3	3.86	8
Lefty Weinert	10	22.0	1	1	6.14	10

==== Relief pitchers ====
Note: G = Games pitched; W = Wins; L = Losses; SV = Saves; ERA = Earned run average; SO = Strikeouts

Player	G	W	L	SV	ERA	SO
Huck Betts	27	1	1	0	3.57	18
Johnny Enzmann	16	2	3	0	3.84	35
Jimmie Keenan	1	0	0	0	3.00	2
