= Eddie Eayrs =

American baseball player (1890–1969)

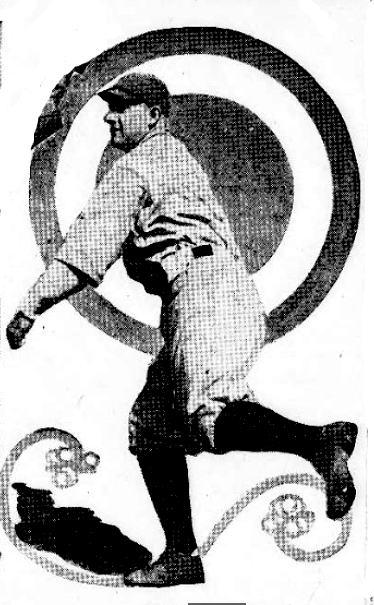
- Outfielder / Pitcher
- Born: November 10, 1890; Blackstone, Massachusetts, U.S.
- Died: November 30, 1969 (aged 79); Warwick, Rhode Island, U.S.
- Batted: Left Threw: Left

MLB debut
- June 30, 1913, for the Pittsburgh Pirates

Last MLB appearance
- October 1, 1921, for the Brooklyn Robins

MLB statistics
- Batting average: .306
- Home runs: 1
- Runs batted in: 26
- Earned run average: 6.23
- Stats at Baseball Reference

Teams
- Pittsburgh Pirates (1913); Boston Braves (1920–1921); Brooklyn Robins (1921)

Edwin Eayrs (November 10, 1890 – November 30, 1969) was an American Major League Baseball player who played outfield from 1913 to 1921. He attended Brown University and pitched during his career. Among his pitching appearances, Eayrs was the opening day starter on April 14, 1920 for the Braves, getting credit for the win.
