= Walt Walsh =

American baseball player (1897–1966)

- Pinch runner
- Born: April 30, 1897; Newark, New Jersey
- Died: January 15, 1966 (aged 68); Avon-by-the-Sea, New Jersey
- Batted: Right Threw: Right

MLB debut
- May 4, 1920, for the Philadelphia Phillies

Last MLB appearance
- May 5, 1920, for the Philadelphia Phillies

MLB statistics
- Games played: 2
- At bats: 0
- Hits: 0
- Stats at Baseball Reference

Teams
- Philadelphia Phillies (1920)

Walter William Walsh (April 30, 1897 — January 15, 1966) was a Major League Baseball player. Walsh only played two games, never getting an at-bat for the Philadelphia Phillies in 1920. He was used as a pinch runner in the two games he played.

Walsh was born in Newark, New Jersey and died in Avon-by-the-Sea, New Jersey.
