= Jimmie Keenan =

American baseball player (1899-1980)

- Pitcher
- Born: May 25, 1899; Avon, New York, U.S.
- Died: June 5, 1980 (aged 81); Seminole, Florida, U.S.
- Batted: Left Threw: Left

MLB debut
- September 9, 1920, for the Philadelphia Phillies

Last MLB appearance
- July 4, 1921, for the Philadelphia Phillies

MLB statistics
- Win–loss record: 1–2
- Earned run average: 6.37
- Strikeouts: 9
- Stats at Baseball Reference

Teams
- Philadelphia Phillies (1920–1921)

James William "Sparkplug" Keenan (May 25, 1899 – June 5, 1980) was an American Major League Baseball pitcher who played for the Philadelphia Phillies in 1920 and 1921.
