= Ted Turner (baseball) =

American baseball player (1892–1958)

- Pitcher
- Born: May 4, 1892; Lawrenceburg, Kentucky
- Died: February 4, 1958 (aged 65); Lexington, Kentucky
- Batted: Right Threw: Right

MLB debut
- April 20, 1920, for the Chicago Cubs

Last MLB appearance
- April 20, 1920, for the Chicago Cubs

MLB statistics
- Win–loss record: 0–0
- Strikeouts: 0
- Earned run average: 13.50
- Stats at Baseball Reference

Teams
- Chicago Cubs (1920)

Theodore Holtop Turner (May 4, 1892 – February 4, 1958), was a Major League Baseball pitcher who appeared in one game in 1920 with the Chicago Cubs. He batted and threw right-handed. Turner had a 0–0 record, with a 13.50 ERA.

He was born in Lawrenceburg, Kentucky, and died in Lexington.
