= Johnny Meador =

American baseball player (1892–1970)

- Pitcher
- Born: December 4, 1892; Madison, North Carolina, U.S.
- Died: April 11, 1970 (aged 77); Winston-Salem, North Carolina, U.S.
- Batted: Right Threw: Right

MLB debut
- April 24, 1920, for the Pittsburgh Pirates

Last MLB appearance
- July 15, 1920, for the Pittsburgh Pirates

MLB statistics
- Win–loss record: 0-2
- Earned run average: 4.21
- Strikeouts: 5
- Stats at Baseball Reference

Teams
- Pittsburgh Pirates (1920)

John Davis Meador (December 4, 1892 – April 11, 1970) was an American pitcher in Major League Baseball. He played for the Pittsburgh Pirates.
