= George Gilham =

American baseball player (1899–1937)

- Catcher
- Born: September 8, 1899; Shamokin, Pennsylvania
- Died: April 25, 1937 (aged 37); Lansdowne, Pennsylvania
- Batted: Right Threw: Right

MLB debut
- September 24, 1920, for the St. Louis Cardinals

Last MLB appearance
- May 10, 1921, for the St. Louis Cardinals

MLB statistics
- Games played: 2
- At bats: 4
- Hits: 0
- Stats at Baseball Reference

Teams
- St. Louis Cardinals (1920–1921)

George Lewis Gilham (September 8, 1899 – April 25, 1937) was a catcher in Major League Baseball. He played for the St. Louis Cardinals.
