= 1920 Brooklyn Robins season =

1920 Brooklyn Robins
- National League champions
- League: National League
- Ballpark: Ebbets Field
- City: Brooklyn, New York
- Record: 93–61 (.604)
- League place: 1st
- Owners: Charles Ebbets, Ed McKeever, Stephen McKeever
- President: Charles Ebbets
- Managers: Wilbert Robinson

Boston Globe cartoon of May 2, 1920 regarding the previous day's game against Brooklyn

The 1920 Brooklyn Robins, also known as the Dodgers, won 16 of their final 18 games to pull away from a tight pennant race and earn a trip to their second World Series against the Cleveland Indians. They lost the series in seven games. The team featured four Hall of Famers: manager Wilbert Robinson, pitchers Burleigh Grimes and Rube Marquard, and outfielder Zack Wheat. Grimes anchored a pitching staff that allowed the fewest runs in the majors.

== Offseason ==
- January 1920: Frank O'Rourke was purchased from the Robins by the Washington Senators.
- January 12, 1920: Mack Wheat was purchased from the Robins by the Philadelphia Phillies.
- March 1920: Bill Lamar was purchased by the Robins from the Boston Red Sox.

== Regular season ==
On May 1, Brooklyn and the Boston Braves played what remains the longest major league baseball game, tied 1 to 1 at the end of nine innings and then going scoreless for 17 more until the 26-inning game was called because of darkness

=== Season standings ===
National League
| Team | W | L | Pct. | GB | Home | Road |
|---|---|---|---|---|---|---|
| Brooklyn Robins | 93 | 61 | .604 | — | 49‍–‍29 | 44‍–‍32 |
| New York Giants | 86 | 68 | .558 | 7 | 45‍–‍35 | 41‍–‍33 |
| Cincinnati Reds | 82 | 71 | .536 | 10½ | 42‍–‍34 | 40‍–‍37 |
| Pittsburgh Pirates | 79 | 75 | .513 | 14 | 42‍–‍35 | 37‍–‍40 |
| St. Louis Cardinals | 75 | 79 | .487 | 18 | 38‍–‍38 | 37‍–‍41 |
| Chicago Cubs | 75 | 79 | .487 | 18 | 43‍–‍34 | 32‍–‍45 |
| Boston Braves | 62 | 90 | .408 | 30 | 36‍–‍37 | 26‍–‍53 |
| Philadelphia Phillies | 62 | 91 | .405 | 30½ | 32‍–‍45 | 30‍–‍46 |

=== Record vs. opponents ===
1920 National League record Sources:
| Team | BSN | BRO | CHC | CIN | NYG | PHI | PIT | STL |
|---|---|---|---|---|---|---|---|---|
| Boston | — | 8–14–1 | 7–15 | 9–12 | 10–12 | 10–11 | 7–15 | 11–11 |
| Brooklyn | 14–8–1 | — | 13–9 | 10–12 | 15–7 | 14–8 | 12–10 | 15–7 |
| Chicago | 15–7 | 9–13 | — | 9–13 | 7–15 | 14–8 | 11–11 | 10–12 |
| Cincinnati | 12–9 | 12–10 | 13–9 | — | 6–16–1 | 14–8 | 12–10 | 13–9 |
| New York | 12–10 | 7–15 | 15–7 | 16–6–1 | — | 12–10 | 13–9 | 11–11 |
| Philadelphia | 11–10 | 8–14 | 8–14 | 8–14 | 10–12 | — | 9–13 | 8–14 |
| Pittsburgh | 15–7 | 10–12 | 11–11 | 10–12 | 9–13 | 13–9 | — | 11–11–1 |
| St. Louis | 11–11 | 7–15 | 12–10 | 9–13 | 11–11 | 14–8 | 11–11–1 | — |

=== Notable transactions ===
- May 22, 1920: Bill McCabe was purchased by the Robins from the Chicago Cubs.
- July 1920: Wally Hood was purchased from the Robins by the Pittsburgh Pirates.
- July 27, 1920: Doug Baird was purchased from the Robins by the New York Giants.

=== Roster ===
1920 Brooklyn Robins
Roster
| Pitchers: Leon Cadore; Burleigh Grimes; Al Mamaux; Rube Marquard; Johnny Miljus; Clarence Mitchell; George Mohart; Jeff Pfeffer; Sherry Smith | Catchers: Rowdy Elliott; Ernie Krueger; Otto Miller; Zack Taylor; Infielders: Doug Baird; Jimmy Johnston; Pete Kilduff; Ed Konetchy; Bill McCabe; Ivy Olson; Ray Schmandt; Jack Sheehan; Red Sheridan; Chuck Ward | Outfielders: Tommy Griffith; Wally Hood; Bill Lamar; Hy Myers; Bernie Neis; Zack Wheat | Manager: Wilbert Robinson |

== Player stats ==
=== Batting ===
==== Starters by position ====
Note: Pos = Position; G = Games played; AB = At bats; R = Runs; H = Hits; Avg. = Batting average; HR = Home runs; RBI = Runs batted in; SB = Stolen bases

| Pos | Player | G | AB | R | H | Avg. | HR | RBI | SB |
|---|---|---|---|---|---|---|---|---|---|
| C | Otto Miller | 90 | 301 | 16 | 87 | .289 | 0 | 33 | 0 |
| 1B | Ed Konetchy | 131 | 497 | 62 | 153 | .308 | 5 | 63 | 3 |
| 2B | Pete Kilduff | 141 | 478 | 62 | 130 | .272 | 0 | 58 | 2 |
| 3B | Jimmy Johnston | 155 | 635 | 87 | 185 | .291 | 1 | 52 | 19 |
| SS | Ivy Olson | 143 | 637 | 71 | 162 | .254 | 1 | 46 | 4 |
| OF | Hy Myers | 154 | 582 | 83 | 177 | .304 | 4 | 80 | 9 |
| OF | Zack Wheat | 148 | 583 | 89 | 191 | .328 | 9 | 73 | 8 |
| OF | Tommy Griffith | 93 | 334 | 41 | 87 | .260 | 2 | 30 | 3 |

==== Other batters ====
Note: G = Games played; AB = At bats; R = Runs; H = Hits; Avg. = Batting average; HR = Home runs; RBI = Runs batted in; SB = Stolen bases

| Player | G | AB | R | H | Avg. | HR | RBI | SB |
|---|---|---|---|---|---|---|---|---|
| Bernie Neis | 95 | 249 | 38 | 63 | .253 | 2 | 22 | 9 |
| Ernie Krueger | 52 | 146 | 21 | 42 | .288 | 1 | 17 | 2 |
| Rowdy Elliott | 41 | 112 | 13 | 27 | .241 | 1 | 13 | 0 |
| Chuck Ward | 19 | 71 | 7 | 11 | .155 | 0 | 4 | 1 |
| Bill McCabe | 41 | 68 | 10 | 10 | .147 | 0 | 3 | 1 |
| Ray Schmandt | 28 | 63 | 7 | 15 | .238 | 0 | 7 | 1 |
| Bill Lamar | 24 | 44 | 5 | 12 | .273 | 0 | 4 | 0 |
| Wally Hood | 7 | 14 | 4 | 2 | .143 | 0 | 1 | 2 |
| Zack Taylor | 9 | 13 | 3 | 5 | .385 | 0 | 5 | 0 |
| Doug Baird | 6 | 6 | 1 | 2 | .333 | 0 | 1 | 0 |
| Jack Sheehan | 3 | 5 | 0 | 2 | .400 | 0 | 0 | 0 |
| Red Sheridan | 3 | 2 | 0 | 0 | .000 | 0 | 0 | 0 |

=== Pitching ===
==== Starting pitchers ====
Note: G = Games pitched; IP = Innings pitched; W = Wins; L = Losses; ERA = Earned run average; BB = Bases on balls; SO = Strikeouts; CG = Complete games

| Player | G | GS | CG | IP | W | L | ERA | BB | SO |
|---|---|---|---|---|---|---|---|---|---|
| Burleigh Grimes | 40 | 33 | 25 | 303.2 | 23 | 11 | 2.22 | 67 | 131 |
| Leon Cadore | 35 | 30 | 16 | 254.1 | 15 | 14 | 2.62 | 56 | 79 |
| Jeff Pfeffer | 30 | 28 | 20 | 215.0 | 16 | 9 | 3.01 | 45 | 80 |
| Rube Marquard | 28 | 26 | 10 | 189.2 | 10 | 7 | 3.23 | 35 | 89 |

==== Other pitchers ====
Note: G = Games pitched; IP = Innings pitched; W = Wins; L = Losses; ERA = Earned run average; BB = Bases on balls; SO = Strikeouts; CG = Complete games

| Player | G | GS | CG | IP | W | L | ERA | BB | SO |
|---|---|---|---|---|---|---|---|---|---|
| Al Mamaux | 41 | 18 | 9 | 190.2 | 12 | 8 | 2.69 | 63 | 101 |
| Sherry Smith | 33 | 12 | 6 | 136.1 | 11 | 9 | 1.85 | 27 | 33 |
| Clarence Mitchell | 19 | 7 | 3 | 78.2 | 5 | 2 | 3.09 | 23 | 18 |

==== Relief pitchers ====
Note: G = Games pitched; IP = Innings pitched; W = Wins; L = Losses; SV = Saves; ERA = Earned run average; BB = Bases on balls; SO = Strikeouts

| Player | G | IP | W | L | SV | ERA | BB | SO |
|---|---|---|---|---|---|---|---|---|
| George Mohart | 13 | 35.2 | 0 | 1 | 0 | 1.77 | 7 | 13 |
| Johnny Miljus | 9 | 23.1 | 1 | 0 | 0 | 3.09 | 4 | 9 |

== Awards and honors ==
=== League top ten finishers ===
Burleigh Grimes

- #2 in NL in strikeouts (131)
- #3 in NL in wins (23)
- #3 in NL in ERA (2.22)

Zack Wheat

- #4 in NL in batting average (.328)
- #4 in NL in on-base percentage (.385)

== 1920 World Series ==
On October 10, 1920, which was the fifth game of the World Series, Elmer Smith of the Indians hit the first grand slam in World Series history. On the same day, Bill Wambsganss of the Indians had an unassisted triple play. He caught a liner, touched second base, and tagged the runner coming from first base. During that same game, Indians pitcher Jim Bagby became the first pitcher to hit a home run in World Series history.

=== Game 1 ===
October 5, 1920, at Ebbets Field in Brooklyn, New York

| Team | 1 | 2 | 3 | 4 | 5 | 6 | 7 | 8 | 9 | R | H | E |
|---|---|---|---|---|---|---|---|---|---|---|---|---|
| Cleveland | 0 | 2 | 0 | 1 | 0 | 0 | 0 | 0 | 0 | 3 | 5 | 0 |
| Brooklyn | 0 | 0 | 0 | 0 | 0 | 0 | 1 | 0 | 0 | 1 | 5 | 1 |
W: Stan Coveleski (1–0) L: Rube Marquard (0–1)

=== Game 2 ===
October 6, 1920, at Ebbets Field in Brooklyn, New York

| Team | 1 | 2 | 3 | 4 | 5 | 6 | 7 | 8 | 9 | R | H | E |
|---|---|---|---|---|---|---|---|---|---|---|---|---|
| Cleveland | 0 | 0 | 0 | 0 | 0 | 0 | 0 | 0 | 0 | 0 | 7 | 1 |
| Brooklyn | 1 | 0 | 1 | 0 | 1 | 0 | 0 | 0 | x | 3 | 7 | 0 |
W: Burleigh Grimes (1–0) L: Jim Bagby (0–1)

=== Game 3 ===
October 7, 1920, at Ebbets Field in Brooklyn, New York

| Team | 1 | 2 | 3 | 4 | 5 | 6 | 7 | 8 | 9 | R | H | E |
|---|---|---|---|---|---|---|---|---|---|---|---|---|
| Cleveland | 0 | 0 | 0 | 1 | 0 | 0 | 0 | 0 | 0 | 1 | 3 | 1 |
| Brooklyn | 2 | 0 | 0 | 0 | 0 | 0 | 0 | 0 | x | 2 | 6 | 1 |
W: Sherry Smith (1–0) L: Ray Caldwell (0–1)

=== Game 4 ===
October 9, 1920, at Dunn Field in Cleveland, Ohio

| Team | 1 | 2 | 3 | 4 | 5 | 6 | 7 | 8 | 9 | R | H | E |
|---|---|---|---|---|---|---|---|---|---|---|---|---|
| Brooklyn | 0 | 0 | 0 | 1 | 0 | 0 | 0 | 0 | 0 | 1 | 5 | 1 |
| Cleveland | 2 | 0 | 2 | 0 | 0 | 1 | 0 | 0 | x | 5 | 12 | 1 |
W: Stan Coveleski (2–0) L: Leon Cadore (0–1)

=== Game 5 ===
October 10, 1920, at Dunn Field in Cleveland, Ohio

| Team | 1 | 2 | 3 | 4 | 5 | 6 | 7 | 8 | 9 | R | H | E |
|---|---|---|---|---|---|---|---|---|---|---|---|---|
| Brooklyn | 0 | 0 | 0 | 0 | 0 | 0 | 0 | 0 | 1 | 1 | 13 | 1 |
| Cleveland | 4 | 0 | 0 | 3 | 1 | 0 | 0 | 0 | x | 8 | 12 | 2 |
W: Jim Bagby (1–1) L: Burleigh Grimes (1–1)
HR: CLE – Elmer Smith (1), Jim Bagby (1)

=== Game 6 ===
October 11, 1920, at Dunn Field in Cleveland, Ohio

| Team | 1 | 2 | 3 | 4 | 5 | 6 | 7 | 8 | 9 | R | H | E |
|---|---|---|---|---|---|---|---|---|---|---|---|---|
| Brooklyn | 0 | 0 | 0 | 0 | 0 | 0 | 0 | 0 | 0 | 0 | 3 | 0 |
| Cleveland | 0 | 0 | 0 | 0 | 1 | 0 | 0 | 0 | x | 1 | 7 | 3 |
W: Duster Mails (1–0) L: Sherry Smith (1–1)

=== Game 7 ===
October 12, 1920, at Dunn Field in Cleveland, Ohio

| Team | 1 | 2 | 3 | 4 | 5 | 6 | 7 | 8 | 9 | R | H | E |
|---|---|---|---|---|---|---|---|---|---|---|---|---|
| Brooklyn | 0 | 0 | 0 | 0 | 0 | 0 | 0 | 0 | 0 | 0 | 5 | 2 |
| Cleveland | 0 | 0 | 0 | 1 | 1 | 0 | 1 | 0 | x | 3 | 7 | 3 |
W: Stan Coveleski (3–0) L: Burleigh Grimes (1–2)
