= Hal Kime =

American baseball player (1898–1939)

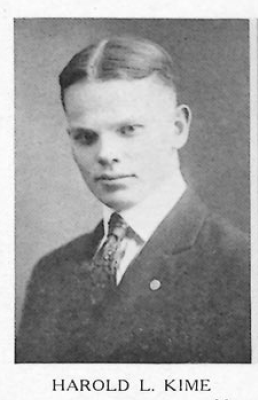
- Pitcher
- Born: March 15, 1898; West Salem, Ohio, U.S.
- Died: May 16, 1939 (aged 41); Columbus, Ohio, U.S.
- Batted: Left Threw: Left

MLB debut
- June 19, 1920, for the St. Louis Cardinals

Last MLB appearance
- July 27, 1920, for the St. Louis Cardinals

MLB statistics
- Win–loss record: 0–0
- Earned run average: 2.57
- Strikeouts: 1
- Stats at Baseball Reference

Teams
- St. Louis Cardinals (1920)

Harold Lee Kime (March 15, 1898 – May 16, 1939) was an American pitcher in Major League Baseball. He played for the St. Louis Cardinals.
