= Walt Schulz =

American baseball player (1900–1928)

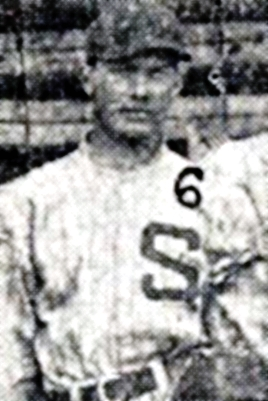
- Pitcher
- Born: April 16, 1900; St. Louis, Missouri
- Died: February 27, 1928 (aged 27); Prescott, Arizona
- Batted: Right Threw: Right

MLB debut
- July 8, 1920, for the St. Louis Cardinals

Last MLB appearance
- September 24, 1920, for the St. Louis Cardinals

MLB statistics
- Games pitched: 2
- Innings pitched: 6.0
- Earned run average: 6.00
- Stats at Baseball Reference

Teams
- St. Louis Cardinals (1920)

Walter Frederick Schulz (April 18, 1900 – February 27, 1928) was a Major League Baseball pitcher who played for the St. Louis Cardinals in 1920, the same year that Rogers Hornsby won the first of his seven batting titles.

Schulz worked as a salesman when he moved to Arizona because of pulmonary tuberculosis. He died at Mercy Hospital in Prescott, eight years after his only season in the major leagues. Schulz was buried at Sunset Memorial Park in Affton, Missouri, alongside his mother, Minnie Kreutzinger, who had worked in St. Louis as a nurse.
