= Sumpter Clarke =

American baseball player (1897–1962)

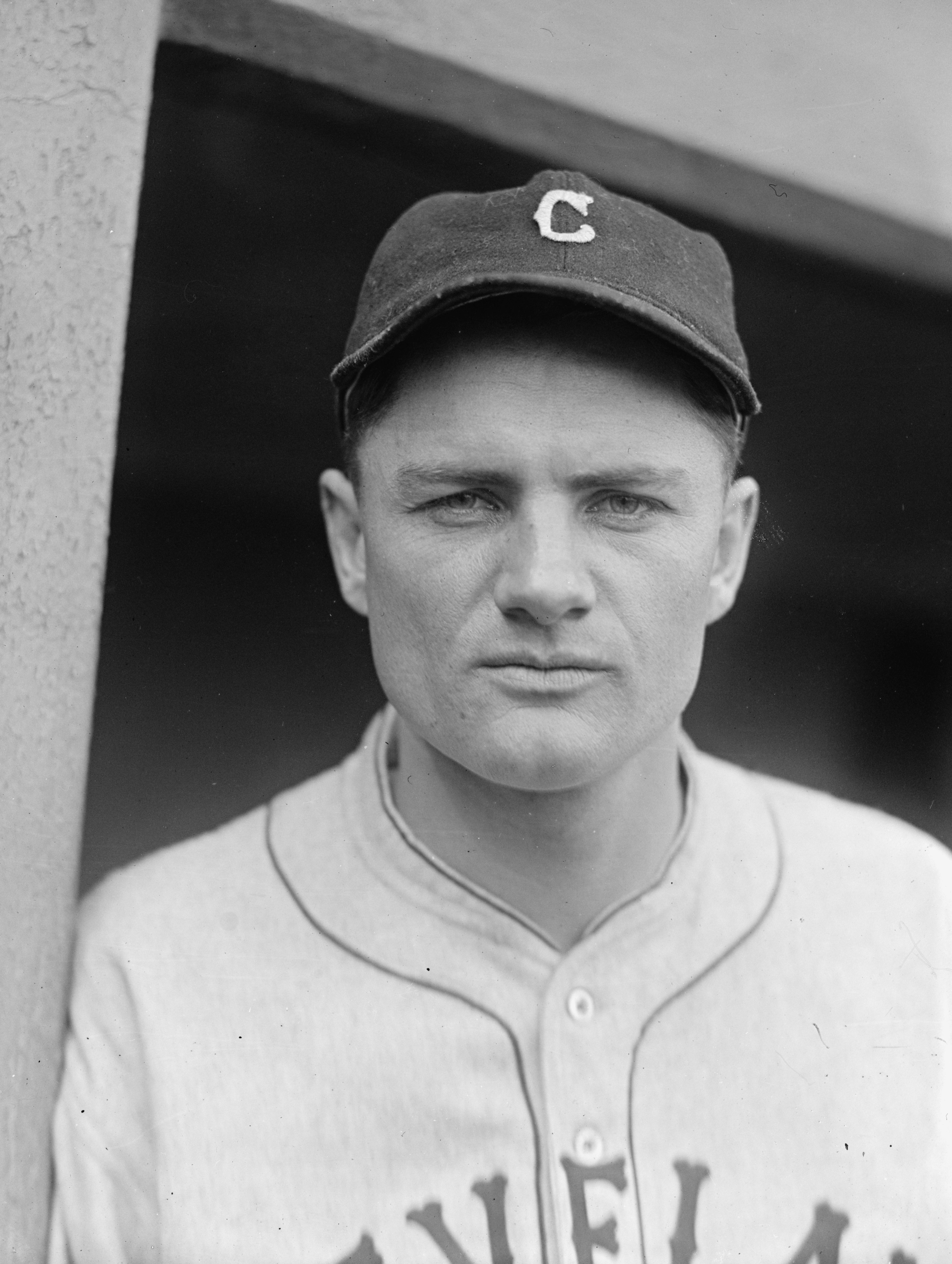
- Outfielder
- Born: October 18, 1897; Savannah, Georgia, U.S.
- Died: March 16, 1962 (aged 64); Knoxville, Tennessee, U.S.
- Batted: Right Threw: Right

MLB debut
- September 27, 1920, for the Chicago Cubs

Last MLB appearance
- September 19, 1924, for the Cleveland Indians

MLB statistics
- Batting average: .227
- Home runs: 0
- Runs batted in: 11
- Stats at Baseball Reference

Teams
- Chicago Cubs (1920); Cleveland Indians (1923–24)

Sumpter Mills Clarke (October 18, 1897 – March 16, 1962) was an American Major League Baseball outfielder for the Chicago Cubs and the Cleveland Indians from 1920 to 1924.

Clarke was suspended from playing baseball in August 1921; he got into a fight with the manager of the Birmingham minor league team on August 29, 1921 over a missed ground ball. While fellow Birmingham player Pie Traynor was called up to Bigs to help Pittsburgh with their run for the National League pennant, Clarke would sit out the remainder of the season.
