= Bill Haeffner =

American baseball player (1894–1982)

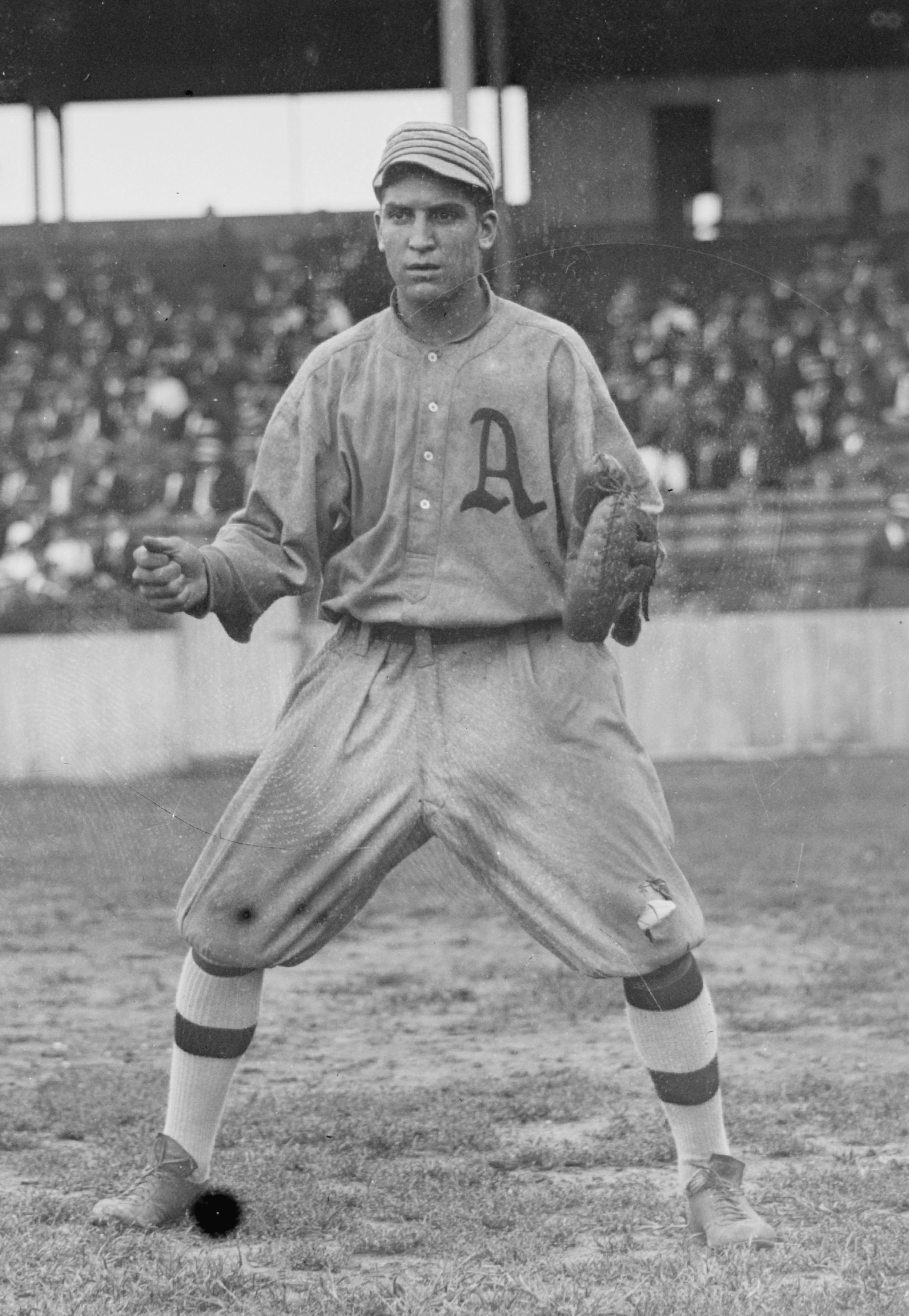
- Catcher
- Born: July 18, 1894; Philadelphia, Pennsylvania, U.S.
- Died: January 27, 1982 (aged 87); Delaware County, Pennsylvania, U.S.
- Batted: Right Threw: Right

MLB debut
- June 29, 1915, for the Philadelphia Athletics

Last MLB appearance
- May 5, 1928, for the New York Giants

MLB statistics
- Batting average: .194
- Home runs: 0
- Runs batted in: 14
- Stats at Baseball Reference

Teams
- Philadelphia Athletics (1915); Pittsburgh Pirates (1920); New York Giants (1928)

William Bernard Haeffner (July 18, 1894 – January 27, 1982) was an American Major League Baseball catcher. He played for the Philadelphia Athletics during the 1915 season, but his athletic career was interrupted by wartime service in the United States Navy during World War I. After the war, he played for the Pittsburgh Pirates during the 1920 season, and the New York Giants during the 1928 season.

In 1928 Haeffner joined the coaching staff of Haverford College where he worked until 1938 when he joined the coaching staff of the Drexel Institute of Technology (now Drexel University). During World War II Drexel de-emphasized athletics, and from 1943-1945 Haeffner coached at the Friends' Central School with the understanding that he would resume his post at Drexel after the war's end. He returned to coach at Drexel at the end of war, but left in 1947 to coach for La Salle University. He served as the head baseball coach as La Salle University from 1947 to 1952.

While coaching, he concurrently worked as representative for the Keystone Automobile Club from 1938 until his retirement in 1970. He died on January 27, 1982, and is interred at Mount Peace Cemetery in Philadelphia, Pennsylvania.
