= Jack Wisner =

American baseball player (1899–1981)

- Pitcher
- Born: November 5, 1899; Grand Rapids, Michigan, U.S.
- Died: December 15, 1981 (aged 82); Jackson, Michigan, U.S.
- Batted: Right Threw: Right

MLB debut
- September 12, 1919, for the Pittsburgh Pirates

Last MLB appearance
- May 15, 1926, for the New York Giants

MLB statistics
- Win–loss record: 4–5
- Earned run average: 3.21
- Strikeouts: 35
- Stats at Baseball Reference

Teams
- Pittsburgh Pirates (1919–1920); New York Giants (1925–1926)

John Henry Wisner (November 5, 1899 – December 15, 1981), known as "Big" Jack Wisner, was an American professional baseball pitcher. He played all or part of four seasons in Major League Baseball between 1919 and 1926. He played for the Pittsburgh Pirates and New York Giants.
