= Joe Jaeger =

American baseball player (1895–1963)

- Pitcher
- Born: March 3, 1895; St. Cloud, Minnesota
- Died: December 13, 1963 (aged 68); Hampton, Iowa
- Batted: Right Threw: Right

MLB debut
- July 28, 1920, for the Chicago Cubs

Last MLB appearance
- September 6, 1920, for the Chicago Cubs

MLB statistics
- Games pitched: 2
- Innings pitched: 3.0
- Earned run average: 12.00
- Stats at Baseball Reference

Teams
- Chicago Cubs (1920)

Joseph Peter "Zip" Jaeger (March 3, 1895 – December 13, 1963) was a Major League Baseball pitcher who played in 1920 with the Chicago Cubs. Jaeger began his Major League career on July 28, 1920, and played his final game on September 6, 1920.
