= Tom Grubbs =

American baseball player

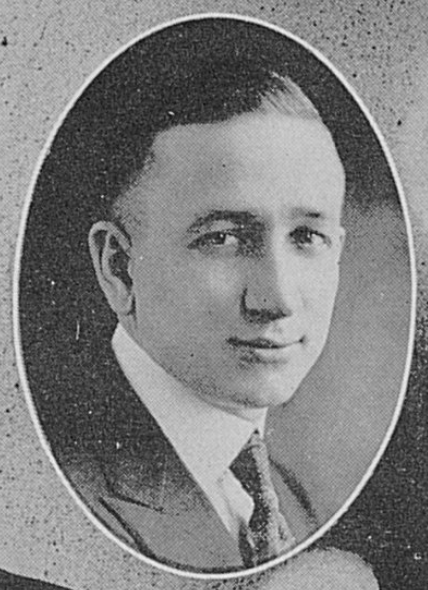
- Pitcher
- Born: February 22, 1894; Mount Sterling, Kentucky
- Died: January 28, 1986 (aged 91); Lexington, Kentucky
- Batted: Right Threw: Right

MLB debut
- October 3, 1920, for the New York Giants

Last MLB appearance
- October 3, 1920, for the New York Giants

MLB statistics
- Win–loss record: 0–1
- Earned run average: 7.20
- Strikeouts: 0
- Stats at Baseball Reference

Teams
- New York Giants (1920)

Thomas Dillard "Judge" Grubbs (February 22, 1894 – January 28, 1986) was a Major League Baseball pitcher who played in one game for the New York Giants on October 3, 1920. He started the game for the Giants, pitching 5.0 innings, allowing nine hits, four earned runs, and taking the loss against the Philadelphia Phillies.
