= Al Lefevre =

American baseball player (1898-1982)

- Infielder
- Born: September 16, 1898; New York City
- Died: January 21, 1982 (aged 83); Glen Cove, New York
- Batted: Right Threw: Right

MLB debut
- June 28, 1920, for the New York Giants

Last MLB appearance
- October 3, 1920, for the New York Giants

MLB statistics
- Games played: 17
- At bats: 27
- Hits: 4
- Stats at Baseball Reference

Teams
- New York Giants (1920)

Alfred Modesto Lefevre (September 16, 1898 – January 21, 1982) was an infielder in Major League Baseball. He played for the New York Giants.
