= Bob Kinsella =

American baseball player (1899-1951)

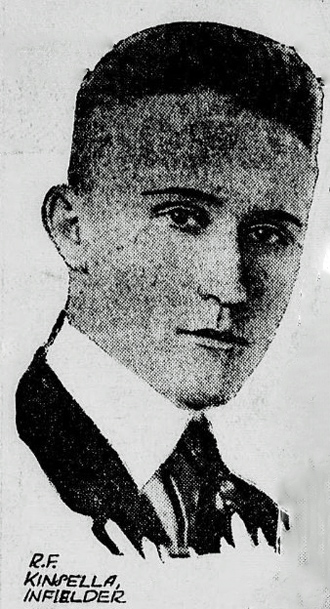
- Outfielder
- Born: January 5, 1899; Springfield, Illinois, U.S.
- Died: December 30, 1951 (aged 52); Los Angeles, California, U.S.
- Batted: Left Threw: Right

MLB debut
- September 20, 1919, for the New York Giants

Last MLB appearance
- October 2, 1920, for the New York Giants

MLB statistics
- Games played: 4
- At bats: 12
- Hits: 3
- Stats at Baseball Reference

Teams
- New York Giants (1919–1920)

Robert Francis "Red" Kinsella (January 5, 1899 – December 30, 1951) was an American outfielder in Major League Baseball. He played for the New York Giants.
