= 1920 Boston Braves season =

1920 Boston Braves
- League: National League
- Ballpark: Braves Field
- City: Boston, Massachusetts
- Record: 62–90 (.408)
- League place: 7th
- Owners: George W. Grant
- Managers: George Stallings

The 1920 Boston Braves season was the 50th season of the franchise.

== Regular season ==
On May 1, the Braves and the Brooklyn Robins (later the Brooklyn Dodgers and now the Los Angeles Dodgers) played what remains the longest major league baseball game, tied 1 to 1 at the end of nine innings and then going scoreless for 17 more until the 26-inning game was called because of darkness

=== Season standings ===
National League
Team	W	L	Pct.	GB	Home	Road
Brooklyn Robins	93	61	.604	—	49‍–‍29	44‍–‍32
New York Giants	86	68	.558	7	45‍–‍35	41‍–‍33
Cincinnati Reds	82	71	.536	10½	42‍–‍34	40‍–‍37
Pittsburgh Pirates	79	75	.513	14	42‍–‍35	37‍–‍40
St. Louis Cardinals	75	79	.487	18	38‍–‍38	37‍–‍41
Chicago Cubs	75	79	.487	18	43‍–‍34	32‍–‍45
Boston Braves	62	90	.408	30	36‍–‍37	26‍–‍53
Philadelphia Phillies	62	91	.405	30½	32‍–‍45	30‍–‍46

=== Record vs. opponents ===
1920 National League record Sources:
Team	BSN	BRO	CHC	CIN	NYG	PHI	PIT	STL
Boston	—	8–14–1	7–15	9–12	10–12	10–11	7–15	11–11
Brooklyn	14–8–1	—	13–9	10–12	15–7	14–8	12–10	15–7
Chicago	15–7	9–13	—	9–13	7–15	14–8	11–11	10–12
Cincinnati	12–9	12–10	13–9	—	6–16–1	14–8	12–10	13–9
New York	12–10	7–15	15–7	16–6–1	—	12–10	13–9	11–11
Philadelphia	11–10	8–14	8–14	8–14	10–12	—	9–13	8–14
Pittsburgh	15–7	10–12	11–11	10–12	9–13	13–9	—	11–11–1
St. Louis	11–11	7–15	12–10	9–13	11–11	14–8	11–11–1	—

=== Notable transaction ===
- August 21, 1920: Frank Gibson was purchased by the Braves from the San Antonio Bears.

=== Roster ===
1920 Boston Braves
Roster
Pitchers: Dana Fillingim; Bunny Hearn; Johnny Jones; Hugh McQuillan; Joe Oeschger; Al Pierotti; Dick Rudolph; Jack Scott; Ira Townsend; Leo Townsend; Mule Watson	Catchers: Hank Gowdy; Mickey O'Neil; Infielders: Tony Boeckel; Hod Ford; Walter Holke; Rabbit Maranville; Charlie Pick; Johnny Rawlings; Red Torphy; Tom Whelan; Art Wilson	Outfielders: Gene Bailey; Lloyd Christenbury; Walton Cruise; Eddie Eayrs; Les Mann; Ray Powell; John Sullivan; Other batters: Oscar Dugey	Manager: George Stallings

== Player stats ==
=== Batting ===
==== Starters by position ====
Note: Pos = Position; G = Games played; AB = At bats; H = Hits; Avg. = Batting average; HR = Home runs; RBI = Runs batted in

Pos	Player	G	AB	H	Avg.	HR	RBI
C	Mickey O'Neil	112	304	86	.283	0	28
1B	Walter Holke	144	551	162	.294	3	64
2B	Charlie Pick	95	383	105	.274	2	28
SS	Rabbit Maranville	134	493	131	.266	1	43
3B	Tony Boeckel	153	582	156	.268	3	62
OF	Ray Powell	147	609	137	.225	6	29
OF	Leslie Mann	115	424	117	.276	3	32
OF	Walton Cruise	91	288	80	.278	1	21

==== Other batters ====
Note: G = Games played; AB = At bats; H = Hits; Avg. = Batting average; HR = Home runs; RBI = Runs batted in

Player	G	AB	H	Avg.	HR	RBI
Hod Ford	88	257	62	.241	1	30
John Sullivan	81	250	74	.296	1	28
Eddie Eayrs	87	244	80	.328	1	24
Hank Gowdy	80	214	52	.243	0	18
Lloyd Christenbury	65	106	22	.208	0	14
Gene Bailey	13	24	2	.083	0	0
Art Wilson	16	19	1	.053	0	0
Red Torphy	3	15	3	.200	0	2
Johnny Rawlings	5	3	0	.000	0	2
Tom Whelan	1	1	0	.000	0	0
Oscar Dugey	5	0	0	----	0	0

=== Pitching ===
==== Starting pitchers ====
Note: G = Games pitched; IP = Innings pitched; W = Wins; L = Losses; ERA = Earned run average; SO = Strikeouts

Player	G	IP	W	L	ERA	SO
Joe Oeschger	38	299.0	15	13	3.46	80
Jack Scott	44	291.0	10	21	3.53	94
Dana Fillingim	37	272.0	12	21	3.11	66
Hugh McQuillan	38	225.2	11	15	3.55	53
Mule Watson	13	74.2	5	4	3.62	16

==== Other pitchers ====
Note: G = Games pitched; IP = Innings pitched; W = Wins; L = Losses; ERA = Earned run average; SO = Strikeouts

Player	G	IP	W	L	ERA	SO
Dick Rudolph	18	89.0	4	8	4.04	24
Bunny Hearn	11	43.0	0	3	5.65	9
Eddie Eayrs	7	26.1	1	2	5.47	7
Al Pierotti	6	25.0	1	1	2.88	12
Leo Townsend	7	24.1	2	2	1.48	0
Johnny Jones	3	9.2	1	0	6.52	6
Ira Townsend	4	6.2	0	0	1.35	1
