= George Scott (pitcher) =

American baseball player (1895–1962)

- Pitcher
- Born: November 17, 1895; Appanoose County, Iowa, U.S.
- Died: December 3, 1962 (aged 67); Philomath, Oregon, U.S.
- Batted: Right Threw: Right

MLB debut
- August 17, 1920, for the St. Louis Cardinals

Last MLB appearance
- September 13, 1920, for the St. Louis Cardinals

MLB statistics
- Win–loss record: 0-0
- Strikeouts: 1
- Earned run average: 4.50
- Stats at Baseball Reference

Teams
- St. Louis Cardinals (1920)

George Wilson Scott (November 17, 1895 – December 3, 1962) was an American Major League Baseball pitcher. His major league career consisted of two games in 1920 for the St. Louis Cardinals, spaced nearly a month apart.

== Sources ==
- Career statistics from Baseball Reference · Baseball Reference (Minors) · Retrosheet · Baseball Almanac
