= Bill Schindler (baseball) =

American baseball player (1896–1979)

- Catcher
- Born: July 10, 1896; Perryville, Missouri
- Died: February 6, 1979 (aged 82); Perryville, Missouri
- Batted: Right Threw: Right

MLB debut
- September 3, 1920, for the St. Louis Cardinals

Last MLB appearance
- September 3, 1920, for the St. Louis Cardinals

MLB statistics
- Games played: 1
- At bats: 2
- Hits: 0
- Stats at Baseball Reference

Teams
- St. Louis Cardinals (1920)

William Gibbons Schindler (July 10, 1896 – February 6, 1979) was a Major League Baseball catcher who played for the St. Louis Cardinals in 1920.
