= Fred Lear =

American baseball player (1894–1955)

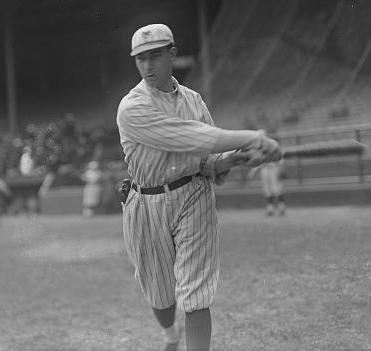
- Third baseman
- Born: April 7, 1894; New York City
- Died: October 13, 1955 (aged 61); East Orange, New Jersey
- Batted: Right Threw: Right

MLB debut
- June 7, 1915, for the Philadelphia Athletics

Last MLB appearance
- June 22, 1920, for the New York Giants

MLB statistics
- Batting average: .235
- Home runs: 2
- Runs batted in: 18
- Stats at Baseball Reference

Teams
- Philadelphia Athletics (1915); Chicago Cubs (1918–1919); New York Giants (1920)

Frederick Francis Lear (April 7, 1894 – October 13, 1955) was a Major League Baseball third baseman. He played all or part of four seasons in the majors, between 1915 and 1920 for the Philadelphia Athletics, Chicago Cubs, and New York Giants.
