= George Mohart =

American baseball player (1892-1970)

- Pitcher
- Born: March 6, 1892; Buffalo, New York
- Died: October 2, 1970 (aged 78); Silver Creek, New York
- Batted: Right Threw: Right

MLB debut
- April 15, 1920, for the Brooklyn Robins

Last MLB appearance
- May 30, 1921, for the Brooklyn Robins

MLB statistics
- Win–loss record: 0–1
- Earned run average: 2.11
- Strikeouts: 14
- Stats at Baseball Reference

Teams
- Brooklyn Robins (1920–1921)

George Benjamin Mohart (March 6, 1892 – October 2, 1970) was a pitcher in Major League Baseball. He pitched in fifteen games for the Brooklyn Robins during the 1920–1921 baseball seasons.
