= Lloyd Christenbury =

American baseball player (1893–1944)

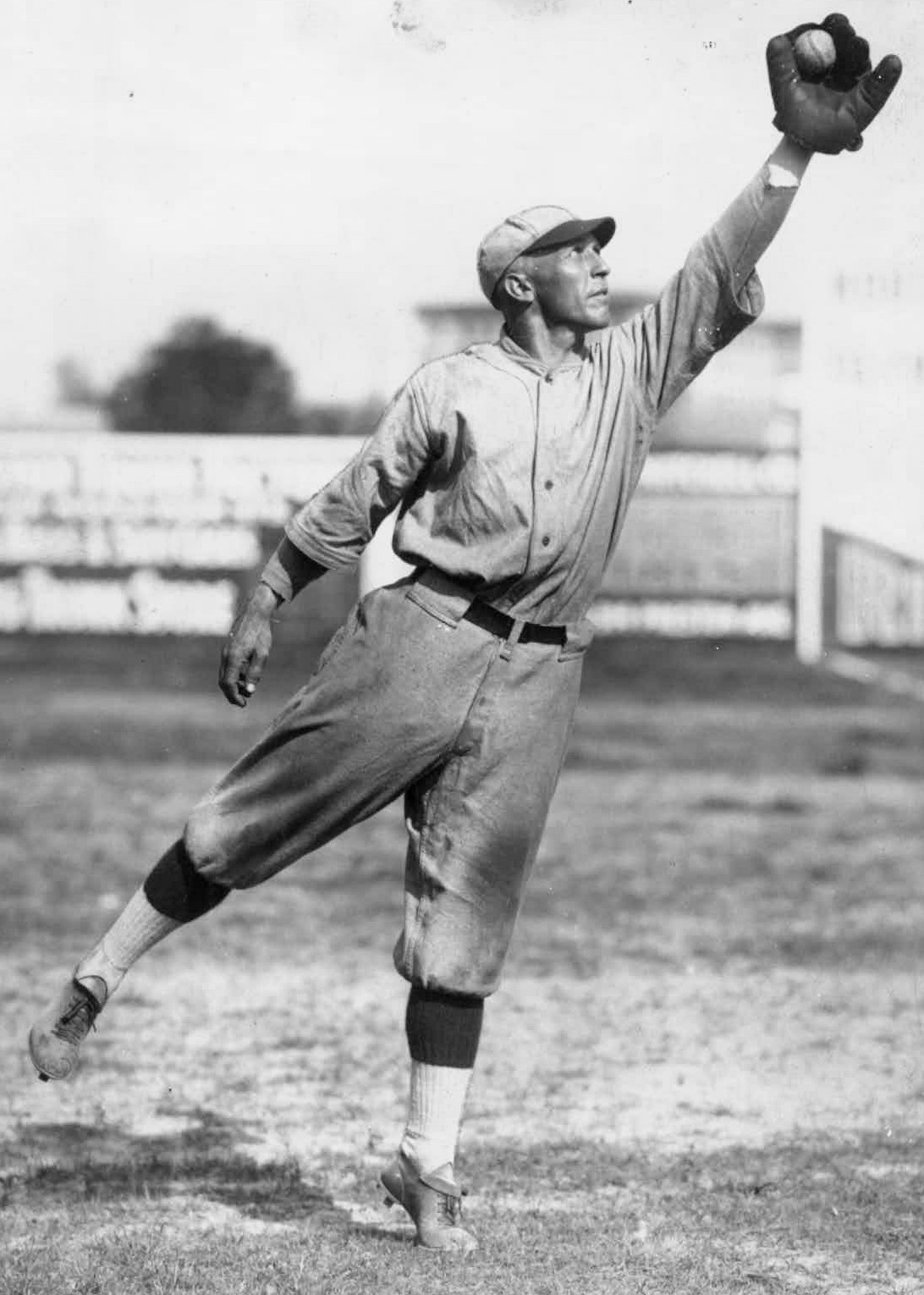
- Leftfielder / Second baseman
- Born: October 19, 1893; Mecklenburg County, North Carolina, U.S.
- Died: December 13, 1944 (aged 51); Birmingham, Alabama, U.S.
- Batted: Left Threw: Right

MLB debut
- September 20, 1919, for the Boston Braves

Last MLB appearance
- October 1, 1922, for the Boston Braves

MLB statistics
- Batting average: .273
- Home runs: 4
- Runs batted in: 47
- Stats at Baseball Reference

Teams
- Boston Braves (1919–1922)

Lloyd Reid "Low" Christenbury (October 19, 1893 – December 13, 1944) is an American former Major League Baseball player. He played four seasons with the Boston Braves from 1919 to 1922.
