= James Bizzle =

American baseball player

- Left fielder
- Born: March 9, 1920; Arkadelphia, Arkansas, U.S.
- Died: July 23, 1987 (aged 67); St. Louis, Missouri, U.S.
- Batted: Unknown Threw: Unknown

Negro league baseball debut
- 1947, for the Birmingham Black Barons

Last appearance
- 1947, for the Birmingham Black Barons
- Stats at Baseball Reference

Teams
- Birmingham Black Barons (1947)

James Garfield Bizzle (March 9, 1920 – July 23, 1987) was an American professional baseball left fielder in the Negro leagues. He played with the Birmingham Black Barons in 1947.
