= 1920 Major League Baseball season =

1920 MLB season
- League: American League (AL); National League (NL)
- Sport: Baseball
- Duration: Regular season: April 14 – October 3, 1920; World Series: October 5–12, 1920
- Games: 154
- Teams: 16 (8 per league)

Pennant winners
- AL champions: Cleveland Indians
- AL runners-up: Chicago White Sox
- NL champions: Brooklyn Robins
- NL runners-up: New York Giants

World Series
- Champions: Cleveland Indians
- Runners-up: Brooklyn Robins

MLB seasons
- ← 1919 1921 →

Locations of teams for the 1915–1922 American League seasons
American League
Locations of teams for the 1920–1931 National League seasons
National League

The 1920 major league baseball season began on April 14, 1920. The regular season ended on October 3, with the Brooklyn Robins and Cleveland Indians as the regular season champions of the National League and American League, respectively. The postseason began with Game 1 of the 17th World Series on October 5 and ended with Game 7 on October 12. The Indians defeated the Robins, five games to two, capturing their first championship in franchise history. Going into the season, the defending World Series champions were the Cincinnati Reds from the 1919 season.

This was the final season to be presided over by the three-person National Baseball Commission, which ran the major and minor leagues—composed of the American League President, National League President, and one team owner as president. In the wake of the Black Sox scandal, the credibility of baseball had been tarnished with the public and fans and the owners of the teams clamored for credibility to be restored. The owners felt that creating one position with near-unlimited authority was the answer. After the season, the commission was replaced with the newly created office of Commissioner of Baseball.

== Creation of the office of the Commissioner of Baseball ==
Persisting rumors of the Chicago White Sox throwing the previous year's World Series to the Cincinnati Reds and another game during the 1920 season led to the game's brass looking for ways of dealing with the problems of gambling within the sport. At the time, MLB was governed by a three-man National Baseball Commission composed of American League President Ban Johnson, National League President John Heydler and Cincinnati Reds owner Garry Herrmann. At the request of the other owners, Herrmann left the office reducing the commission to be deadlocked by two. With the owners disliking one or both presidents, calls began for stronger leadership, although they opined they could support the continuation of the leagues' presidencies with a well-qualified Commissioner.

A plan that began to circulate and gain support was dubbed the "Lasker Plan", after Albert Lasker, a shareholder of the Chicago Cubs, called for a three-man commission with no financial interest in baseball. With the Black Sox scandal exposed on September 30, 1920, Heydler began calling for the Lasker Plan. All eight NL teams supported the plan, along with three AL teams. The three AL teams were the White Sox, the New York Yankees and the Boston Red Sox. The teams in support of the Lasker Plan wanted federal judge Kenesaw Mountain Landis to take the office of Baseball Commissioner. Johnson, who opposed the plan and thus, the appointment of Landis, had allies in the other five AL clubs, and attempted to get Minor League Baseball to side with him. However, the minor leagues would not, and when the AL teams learned their position, they relented and instead went along with the Lasker Plan. The owners agreed that they needed a person with near-unlimited authority and a powerful person to fill the position of commissioner.

The owners approached Landis, who eventually accepted the position as the first Commissioner of Baseball. He drafted the agreement which gave him almost unlimited authority throughout the major and minor leagues – every owner on down to the batboys was accountable to the Commissioner – including barring owners from dismissing him, speaking critically of him in public or challenging him in court. Landis also kept his job as a federal judge.

While Landis' record as Commissioner would eventually attract considerable controversy, especially with respect to his role in maintaining the color line, at the time a near autocratic leader was widely believed to be needed for baseball since the Black Sox scandal had placed the public's trust in baseball on shaky ground. As a result, the owners accepted the terms of the agreement with a scant trace of opposition, if any.

== Schedule ==
The 1920 schedule consisted of 154 games for all teams in the American League and National League, each of which had eight teams. Each team was scheduled to play 22 games against the other seven teams of their respective league. The 154-game format had previously been used since 1904, except for 1919, and would be used until 1961 in the American League and 1962 in the National League.

Opening Day took place on April 14 with all but the Washington Senators and Boston Red Sox playing. The final day of the regular season was on October 3, with all teams but the Boston Red Sox and New York Yankees playing. The World Series took place between October 5 and October 12.

=== Tripleheader ===
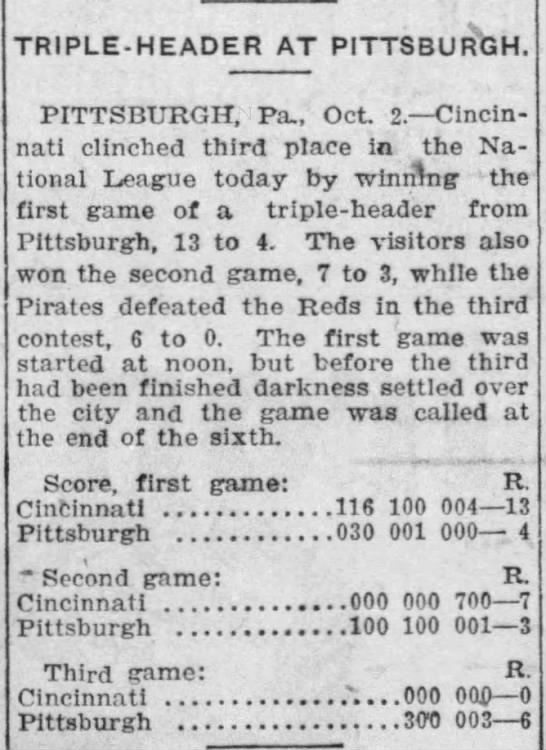
Newspaper account in the Austin American-Statesman of the tripleheader played on October 2, 1920

The 1920 season featured an extremely rare tripleheader—the third in National League and major-league history, having previously occurred only in 1890 and 1896—when the Pittsburgh Pirates hosted the Cincinnati Reds on October 2 for three games, the day before the final day of the regular season. The Reds won the first two games while the Pirates won the third game, which was called after six innings on account of darkness.

== Rule changes ==
The 1920 season saw the following rule changes:

- Having previously withdrawn from the National Agreement over the previous offseason, the Rule 5 draft is reimplemented when the minor leagues voted to renew their working arrangement with the major leagues.
- Fly balls hit over the fence along the left and right-field lines will be judged fair or foul according to where the ball passes the fence, rather than where it landed; previously, umpires would judge based on where the ball landed. On June 25, the rule reverted to the 1919 version, which is based upon where the ball disappears from view. The rule would re-revert to the 1920 version before the 1928 season began.
- When a batter hits a ball over the fence to win the game, he is now credited with a home run. Previously, the batter would be rewarded with the number of bases needed for the team to win the game and were not considered home runs.
- Spitballs, shine balls, emery balls, and other unorthodox ("trick" or "freak") pitches, were outlawed. Foreign substances such as rosin, dirt or mud from the field to scar the ball, spit or phlegm, material from rubbing the ball on the glove or clothing, or any kind of defacing of the ball were banned. Violations to this rule would result in immediate ejection and being barred from any championship contest for a period of ten days. There were 17 pitchers who were exempted from the spitball rule, becoming legacy spitballers (the last of which retired in 1934).
- A balk was to be called if the pitcher releases the ball while the catcher is out of his box.
- The failure of a preceding runner to touch a base would not affect the status of a succeeding runner.
- Cases where the defense intentionally allows the runner to advance without attempting to put him out are scored as defensive indifference, also called fielder's indifference, and do not count as stolen bases. This is usually only scored late in games when it is clear that the defense's priority is getting the batter out. The lack of a putout attempt does not by itself indicate defensive indifference; the official scorer must also factor in the game situation and the defensive players' actions.

== Teams ==
League	Team	City	Ballpark	Capacity	Manager
American League	Boston Red Sox	Boston, Massachusetts	Fenway Park	27,000	Ed Barrow
American League	Chicago White Sox	Chicago, Illinois	Comiskey Park	28,000	Kid Gleason
American League	Cleveland Indians	Cleveland, Ohio	Dunn Field	21,414	Tris Speaker
American League	Detroit Tigers	Detroit, Michigan	Navin Field	23,000	Hughie Jennings
American League	New York Yankees	New York, New York	Polo Grounds	38,000	Miller Huggins
American League	Philadelphia Athletics	Philadelphia, Pennsylvania	Shibe Park	23,000	Connie Mack
American League	St. Louis Browns	St. Louis, Missouri	Sportsman's Park	24,040	Jimmy Burke
American League	Washington Senators	Washington, D.C.	National Park	27,000	Clark Griffith
National League	Boston Braves	Boston, Massachusetts	Braves Field	40,000	George Stallings
National League	Brooklyn Robins	New York, New York	Ebbets Field	30,000	Wilbert Robinson
National League	Chicago Cubs	Chicago, Illinois	Cubs Park	15,000	Fred Mitchell
National League	Cincinnati Reds	Cincinnati, Ohio	Redland Field	20,696	Pat Moran
National League	New York Giants	New York, New York	Polo Grounds	38,000	John McGraw
National League	Philadelphia Phillies	Philadelphia, Pennsylvania	National League Park	18,000	Gavvy Cravath
National League	Pittsburgh Pirates	Pittsburgh, Pennsylvania	Forbes Field	25,000	George Gibson
National League	St. Louis Cardinals	St. Louis, Missouri	Sportsman's Park	24,040	Branch Rickey

== Effect of the Black Sox scandal on the AL pennant race ==
After an August 31 game between the Philadelphia Phillies and Chicago Cubs, allegations began to arise that the game was fixed. The state court in Chicago opened a grand jury to investigate gambling within baseball. Gambler Billy Maharg came forward with information that he worked with New York gambler Arnold Rothstein and former boxer Abe Attell to get the White Sox to throw the 1919 World Series. The White Sox again were contending for the American League title and were in a near-dead heat with the Cleveland Indians and New York Yankees. However, on September 28, eight White Sox players were indicted and suspended by owner Charlie Comiskey. The Indians pulled ahead and won the pennant by two games over the White Sox.

== Standings ==
=== American League ===
American League
Team	W	L	Pct.	GB	Home	Road
Cleveland Indians	98	56	.636	—	51‍–‍27	47‍–‍29
Chicago White Sox	96	58	.623	2	52‍–‍25	44‍–‍33
New York Yankees	95	59	.617	3	49‍–‍28	46‍–‍31
St. Louis Browns	76	77	.497	21½	40‍–‍38	36‍–‍39
Boston Red Sox	72	81	.471	25½	41‍–‍35	31‍–‍46
Washington Senators	68	84	.447	29	37‍–‍38	31‍–‍46
Detroit Tigers	61	93	.396	37	32‍–‍46	29‍–‍47
Philadelphia Athletics	48	106	.312	50	25‍–‍50	23‍–‍56

=== National League ===
National League
Team	W	L	Pct.	GB	Home	Road
Brooklyn Robins	93	61	.604	—	49‍–‍29	44‍–‍32
New York Giants	86	68	.558	7	45‍–‍35	41‍–‍33
Cincinnati Reds	82	71	.536	10½	42‍–‍34	40‍–‍37
Pittsburgh Pirates	79	75	.513	14	42‍–‍35	37‍–‍40
St. Louis Cardinals	75	79	.487	18	38‍–‍38	37‍–‍41
Chicago Cubs	75	79	.487	18	43‍–‍34	32‍–‍45
Boston Braves	62	90	.408	30	36‍–‍37	26‍–‍53
Philadelphia Phillies	62	91	.405	30½	32‍–‍45	30‍–‍46

=== Tie games ===
6 tie games (3 in AL, 3 in NL), which are not factored into winning percentage or games behind (and were often replayed again) occurred throughout the season.

==== American League ====
- Boston Red Sox, 1
- Detroit Tigers, 1
- Philadelphia Athletics, 2
- St. Louis Browns, 1
- Washington Senators, 1

==== National League ====
- Boston Braves, 1
- Brooklyn Robins, 1
- Cincinnati Reds, 1
- New York Giants, 1
- Pittsburgh Pirates, 1
- St. Louis Cardinals, 1

== Postseason ==
The postseason began on October 5 and ended on October 12 with the Cleveland Indians defeating the Brooklyn Robins in the 1920 World Series in seven games.

=== Bracket ===
World Series
AL	Cleveland Indians	5
NL	Brooklyn Robins	2

== Managerial changes ==
=== Off-season ===
Team	Former Manager	New Manager
Pittsburgh Pirates	Hugo Bezdek	George Gibson

== League leaders ==
=== American League ===
Hitting leaders
Stat	Player	Total
AVG	George Sisler (SLB)	.407
OPS	Babe Ruth (NYY)	1.379
HR	Babe Ruth (NYY)	54
RBI	Babe Ruth (NYY)	135
R	Babe Ruth (NYY)	158
H	George Sisler (SLB)	257
SB	Sam Rice (WSH)	63

Pitching leaders
Stat	Player	Total
W	Jim Bagby (CLE)	31
L	Scott Perry (PHA)	25
ERA	Bob Shawkey (NYY)	2.45
K	Stan Coveleski (CLE)	133
IP	Jim Bagby (CLE)	339.2
SV	Dickey Kerr (CWS); Urban Shocker (SLB)	5
WHIP	Stan Coveleski (CLE)	1.108

=== National League ===
Hitting leaders
Stat	Player	Total
AVG	Rogers Hornsby (STL)	.370
OPS	Rogers Hornsby (STL)	.990
HR	Cy Williams (PHI)	15
RBI	Rogers Hornsby (STL); George Kelly (NYG)	94
R	George Burns (NYG)	115
H	Rogers Hornsby (STL)	218
SB	Max Carey (PIT)	52

Pitching leaders
Stat	Player	Total
W	Grover Alexander^{1} (CHC)	27
L	Eppa Rixey (PHI)	22
ERA	Grover Alexander^{1} (CHC)	1.91
K	Grover Alexander^{1} (CHC)	173
IP	Grover Alexander (CHC)	363.1
SV	Bill Sherdel (STL)	6
WHIP	Babe Adams (PIT)	0.981

^{1} National League Triple Crown pitching winner

== Milestones ==
=== Batters ===
==== Cycles ====
- George Sisler (SLB):
  - Sisler hit for his first cycle and first in franchise history, in game two of a doubleheader on August 8 against the WSH.
- George Burns (NYG)
  - Burns hit for his first cycle and fifth in franchise history, on September 17 against the Pittsburgh Pirates.
- Bobby Veach (DET):
  - Veach hit for his first cycle and first in franchise history, on September 17 against the Boston Red Sox.

=== Pitchers ===
==== No-hitters ====
- Rube Marquard (NYG):
  - Marquard threw his first career no-hitter and sixth no-hitter in franchise history, by defeating the Brooklyn Robins 2–0 on April 15. Marquard walked two and struck out two.

==== Other pitching accomplishments ====
- Walter Johnson (WSH):
  - Became the 10th member of the 300-win club, defeating the Detroit Tigers on May 14, winning 9–8.

=== Miscellaneous ===
- Chicago White Sox:
  - Set a major league record for most runs scored in the 16th inning, by scoring eight runs against the Washington Senators on May 20.
- Everett Scott (BOS):
  - Broke a Major League record for most consecutive games on June 21 by surpassing George Pinkney's record of 577.
- New York Yankees:
  - Set a major league record for most runs scored in the fifth inning, by scoring 14 runs against the Washington Senators on July 6.
- New York Giants:
  - Set a major league record for most runs scored in the 17th inning, by scoring seven runs against the Pittsburgh Pirates on July 16.
- Pittsburgh Pirates / Cincinnati Reds:
  - Play in the last of three Major League tripleheader in history on October 2. Cincinnati wins the first two games and Pittsburgh wins the last game.

== Home field attendance ==
Team name	Wins	%±	Home attendance	%±	Per game
New York Yankees	95	18.8%	1,289,422	108.3%	16,746
New York Giants	86	−1.1%	929,609	31.1%	11,620
Cleveland Indians	98	16.7%	912,832	69.6%	11,703
Chicago White Sox	96	9.1%	833,492	32.9%	10,825
Brooklyn Robins	93	34.8%	808,722	124.2%	10,368
Detroit Tigers	61	−23.8%	579,650	−10.0%	7,431
Cincinnati Reds	82	−14.6%	568,107	6.7%	7,378
Chicago Cubs	75	0.0%	480,783	13.3%	6,244
Pittsburgh Pirates	79	11.3%	429,037	55.0%	5,500
St. Louis Browns	76	13.4%	419,311	20.0%	5,376
Boston Red Sox	72	9.1%	402,445	−3.6%	5,295
Washington Senators	68	21.4%	359,260	53.5%	4,727
Philadelphia Phillies	62	31.9%	330,998	37.7%	4,299
St. Louis Cardinals	75	38.9%	326,836	95.6%	4,300
Philadelphia Athletics	48	33.3%	287,888	27.8%	3,739
Boston Braves	62	8.8%	162,483	−2.9%	2,196

== Venues ==
The Chicago Cubs' Weeghman Park is renamed to Cubs Park.

By 1920, the name of Brush Stadium, home of the New York Giants and New York Yankees, fell into disuse, reverting to the Polo Grounds name.

The St. Louis Cardinals would play their last game at Cardinal Field on June 6, having played 28 seasons there going back to 1893, and returned to Sportsman's Park on July 1, having previously been their home venue for 11 season from 1882 to 1892, as well as the home of the St. Louis Browns since their relocation from Milwaukee, Wisconsin in 1902. The Cardinals would go on to play at Sportsman's Park for another 47 seasons through early 1966.

== See also ==
- 1920 in baseball (Events, Births, Deaths)

== Bibliography ==
- Cottrell, Robert C. (2002). Blackball, the Black Sox, and the Babe. Jefferson, North Carolina: McFarland & Co. ISBN 978-7-86411-643-6.
- Pietrusza, David (1998). Judge and Jury: The Life and Times of Judge Kenesaw Mountain Landis. South Bend, Indiana: Diamond Communications. ISBN 978-1-888698-09-1.
- Spink, J. G. Taylor (1974). Judge Landis and 25 Years of Baseball (revised ed.). St. Louis: The Sporting News Publishing Company. ASIN B0006CGPF6.
