= 1920 in baseball =

The following are the baseball events of the year 1920 throughout the world.

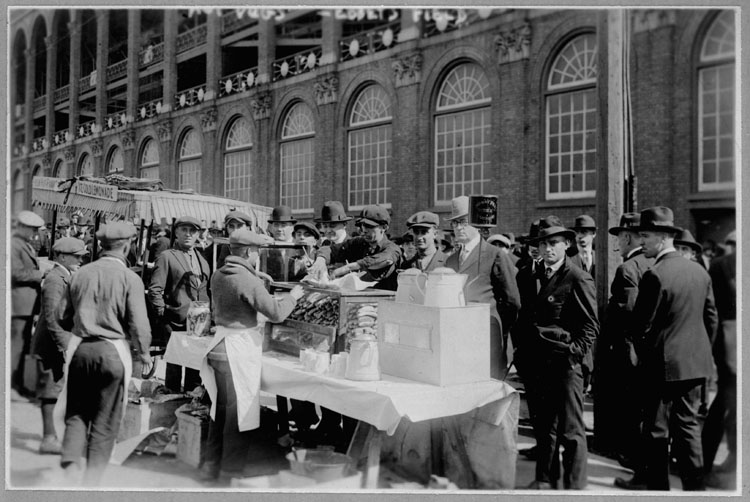
Fans line up for hot dogs at Ebbets Field.

== Champions ==
- World Series: Cleveland Indians over Brooklyn Robins (5–2)

== Statistical leaders ==
	American League		National League		Negro National League	
Stat	Player	Total	Player	Total	Player	Total
AVG	George Sisler (SLB)	.407	Rogers Hornsby (STL)	.370	Cristóbal Torriente (CAG)	.411
HR	Babe Ruth (NYY)	54	Cy Williams (PHI)	15	Edgar Wesley (DTS)	11
RBI	Babe Ruth (NYY)	135	Rogers Hornsby (STL); George Kelly (NYG)	94	Ben Taylor (ABC)	64
W	Jim Bagby (CLE)	31	Grover Alexander^{1} (CHC)	27	Bill Gatewood (DTS)	15
ERA	Bob Shawkey (NYY)	2.45	Grover Alexander^{1} (CHC)	1.72	Dave Brown (CAG)	1.82
K	Stan Coveleski (CLE)	133	Grover Alexander^{1} (CHC)	173	Sam Crawford (KCM)	106

^{1} National League Triple Crown pitching winner

== Major league baseball final standings ==
=== American League final standings ===
American League
Team	W	L	Pct.	GB	Home	Road
Cleveland Indians	98	56	.636	—	51‍–‍27	47‍–‍29
Chicago White Sox	96	58	.623	2	52‍–‍25	44‍–‍33
New York Yankees	95	59	.617	3	49‍–‍28	46‍–‍31
St. Louis Browns	76	77	.497	21½	40‍–‍38	36‍–‍39
Boston Red Sox	72	81	.471	25½	41‍–‍35	31‍–‍46
Washington Senators	68	84	.447	29	37‍–‍38	31‍–‍46
Detroit Tigers	61	93	.396	37	32‍–‍46	29‍–‍47
Philadelphia Athletics	48	106	.312	50	25‍–‍50	23‍–‍56

Locations of teams for the 1915–1922 American League seasons
American League

=== National League final standings ===
National League
Team	W	L	Pct.	GB	Home	Road
Brooklyn Robins	93	61	.604	—	49‍–‍29	44‍–‍32
New York Giants	86	68	.558	7	45‍–‍35	41‍–‍33
Cincinnati Reds	82	71	.536	10½	42‍–‍34	40‍–‍37
Pittsburgh Pirates	79	75	.513	14	42‍–‍35	37‍–‍40
St. Louis Cardinals	75	79	.487	18	38‍–‍38	37‍–‍41
Chicago Cubs	75	79	.487	18	43‍–‍34	32‍–‍45
Boston Braves	62	90	.408	30	36‍–‍37	26‍–‍53
Philadelphia Phillies	62	91	.405	30½	32‍–‍45	30‍–‍46

Locations of teams for the 1920–1931 National League seasons
National League

== Negro league final standings ==
All Negro leagues standings below are per MLB and Seamheads.

=== Negro National League final standings ===
This was the first season of organized Negro league baseball. The first Negro National League would run for the next decade and is considered to be of major league status. The Chicago American Giants, managed by league founder and former player Rube Foster, won the first league pennant.

vs. Negro National League						vs. Major Black teams			
Negro National League	W	L	T	Pct.	GB	W	L	T	Pct.
Chicago American Giants	45	15	2	.742	—	51	19	2	.722
Detroit Stars	38	25	0	.603	8½	41	27	0	.603
Kansas City Monarchs	42	35	2	.544	11½	42	35	2	.561
Cuban Stars (West)	35	34	0	.507	14½	35	34	0	.507
Indianapolis ABCs	41	40	4	.506	14½	46	45	5	.505
St. Louis Giants	33	39	0	.458	18	33	39	0	.458
Dayton Marcos	17	37	0	.315	25	17	37	0	.315
Chicago Giants	5	31	0	.139	26	6	36	0	.143

Locations of teams for the 1920 Negro National League season
Negro National League
Traveling teams: Chicago Giants and Cuban Stars

=== East (independent teams) final standings ===
A loose confederation of teams were gathered in the East to compete with the West, however East teams did not organize a formal league as the West did.

vs. All Teams
Eastern Independent Clubs	W	L	T	Pct.	GB
Brooklyn Royal Giants	13	7	2	.636	—
Atlantic City Bacharach Giants	22	16	1	.577	—
Hilldale Club	9	9	2	.500	3
Baltimore Black Sox	1	1	0	.500	3
New York Lincoln Giants	4	8	0	.333	5
Pennsylvania Red Caps	1	2	0	.333	3½
Cuban Stars (East)	5	11	0	.313	6

- Win-loss records were sporadically reported due to lack of interest by the press mainly in New York.
- Bacharach claimed the pennant, although Hilldale disputed it.

== Events ==
=== January–June ===
- January 3 – The New York Yankees purchase outfielder Babe Ruth from the Boston Red Sox for $100,000.
- January 12 – A plan that was originally developed by Charles Ebbets is finally adopted by major league baseball owners. It was a plan for a draft of minor league players by major league teams via an inverse of how the teams finished in the standings the previous season.
- February 13 – A meeting in Kansas City results in the birth of the Negro National League. Rube Foster spearheads the formation of the league, which will consist of eight franchises: Chicago American Giants, Chicago Giants, Cuban Stars, Dayton Marcos, Detroit Stars, Indianapolis ABCs, Kansas City Monarchs and St. Louis Giants.
- April 8 – The St. Louis Cardinals release pitcher Red Ames.
- April 14 – Stan Coveleski and the Cleveland Indians hold the St. Louis Browns to five hits in a 5–0 victory at Dunn Field. The Chicago White Sox defeat the Detroit Tigers 3–2 and the Philadelphia Athletics defeat the New York Yankees 3–1 as the road teams win two of the three contests in the season openers in the American League.
- April 19 – Babe Ruth enters Fenway Park as a member of the opposing team for the first time in his career as the Boston Red Sox sweep a doubleheader from Ruth and the New York Yankees. Ruth goes three-for-eight with an RBI.
- April 25 – High Pockets Kelly drives in three as the New York Giants defeat the Brooklyn Robins 5–2 in the first meeting of the National League's two New York teams.
- May 1 – The Brooklyn Robins' Leon Cadore and the Boston Braves' Joe Oeschger pitched 26 innings in a 1–1 tie. Morning rain delayed the start of the game until 3:00 p.m. The Dodgers scored a run in the top of the fifth, a single by Ivy Olson driving in Ernie Krueger. The Braves tied it in the bottom of the sixth with a double by Walt Cruise and a single by Tony Boeckel. The game went into extra innings. No runs were scored for the rest of the game and it was called due to darkness in the 26th inning.
- May 2 – Opening day for the Negro National League.
- May 3 – Dutch Leonard and the Detroit Tigers defeat the Cleveland Indians 5–1 for their first win of the season versus thirteen losses.
- May 14 – Walter Johnson of the Washington Senators records his 300th win.
- May 20 – At Griffith Stadium, the Washington Senators and Chicago White Sox go into extra innings tied at three. The ChiSox score two in the fifteenth inning only to be matched by Washington in the bottom of the inning. Chicago then puts up eight runs in the sixteenth to win the game by a final score of 13–5 in sixteen innings. Red Faber pitches all sixteen innings for Chicago.
- June 1 – In a slugfest at Dunn Field, the Detroit Tigers defeat the Cleveland Indians 11–10. Detroit's Ty Cobb goes two-for-five with two RBIs and a run scored.
- June 8 – Reds outfielder Edd Roush falls asleep in the outfield. Roush laid down while an argument occurred in the infield. Once the argument concludes Heinie Groh attempts to awaken Roush. Roush is ejected by the umpire for delaying the game.
- June 24 – Following a 5–3 loss to the Cincinnati Reds, the Philadelphia Phillies fall into last place in the National League. With the Philadelphia A's having been in last place since the 13th, both Philadelphia teams spend the rest of the season in last.
- June 28 – The Philadelphia Athletics defeat the Washington Senators 6–2 to end an 18-game losing streak. After giving up two runs on two hits and a walk in the first inning, A's starter Slim Harriss cruises the rest of the way for the complete game victory.

=== July–September ===
- July 1 – Six weeks after recording his 300th, Walter Johnson pitches the only no-hitter of his career, as the Washington Senators top the Boston Red Sox, 1–0.
- July 27 – The Washington Senators defeat the Cleveland Indians 19–6. Indians starter Ray Caldwell lasts just 1.1 innings, and is replaced by George Uhle, who gives up four hits and a walk in only a third of an inning of work. Tony Faeth picks up the third out of the second inning to stop the bleeding after the Senators have plated twelve runs. In all, the Senators collect 22 hits as every starter, including pitcher Eric Erickson collects at least one hit.
- August 13 – The New York Yankees complete a three-game sweep of the Cleveland Indians to move within a half game of first place.
- August 16 – Cleveland Indians shortstop Ray Chapman is struck in the head by a pitch from the New York Yankees' Carl Mays in a game at the Polo Grounds. He dies twelve hours later from a fractured skull, making it the only fatal field accident in Major League Baseball history. His death leads to the banning of the spitball.
- September 6 – The Cleveland Indians purchase the contract of Joe Sewell from the New Orleans Pelicans of the Southern Association. Sewell will become the Indians starting shortstop for the next ten years, replacing Ray Chapman, who perished as the result of an on-field beaning days prior.
- September 10 – Hall of Fame Cleveland Indians shortstop Joe Sewell makes his major league debut in a 6–1 loss to the New York Yankees.
- September 15 – In the second game of a double header with the Boston Braves, Hall of famer Pie Traynor makes his major league debut at shortstop for the Pittsburgh Pirates.
- September 17
  - The Detroit Tigers' Bobby Veach and New York Giants' George Burns hit for the cycle, the first time it happened twice on the same day, according to the Elias Sports Bureau. Veach finished 6-for-6, adding two singles, as Burns added a second double to his cycle in New York's 4–3 win over the Pittsburgh Pirates in ten innings. Two separate players would not hit for the cycle on the same day until 2008, when the feat was duplicated by Stephen Drew and Adrián Beltré for the Arizona Diamondbacks and Seattle Mariners, respectively.
  - The Detroit Tigers defeat the Boston Red Sox, 13–12, in 12 innings, despite a major-league record 20 BoSox receiving walks. Eight Tigers also walk to set another ML record of 28 walks in an extra-inning game.
  - St. Louis Browns first baseman George Sisler goes four-for-five in the Browns' 17–6 victory over the Philadelphia Athletics to raise his average to .400. Sisler will end the season with a .407 batting average.
- September 25
  - After having spent most of the season in the minors, and having logged only ten innings pitched all season, Pittsburgh Pirates pitcher Jimmy Zinn pitches all twelve innings in the Pirates' 2–1 extra innings victory over the St. Louis Cardinals. Zinn gives up just six hits in his twelve innings of work.
  - The Boston Red Sox defeat the Philadelphia Athletics 4–2, handing Connie Mack's team their 100th loss of the season.
- September 27 – Babe Ruth hits two home runs, and accounts for all three runs scored in the New York Yankees' 3–0 victory over the Philadelphia Athletics. The two home runs bring his season total to 53. He hits his 54th, and final, home run two days later.

=== October–December ===
- October 1 – The Chicago Cubs' Pete Alexander pitches 17 innings to earn his National League leading 27th victory. Only one of the two runs Alexander surrenders to the St. Louis Cardinals is earned, lowering his ERA to 1.91 for the season, which also leads the league.
- October 2
  - Jim Bagby and the Cleveland Indians defeat the Detroit Tigers 10–1 for Bagby's 31st victory of the season.
  - At Forbes Field, the Pittsburgh Pirates and Cincinnati Reds play the last major league tripleheader, with Cincinnati winning the first two games, 13–4 & 7–3, and Pittsburgh winning the third 6–0 in six innings.
- October 5 – The Cleveland Indians defeat the Brooklyn Robins, 3–1, in Game one of the 1920 World Series at Ebbets Field. Indians' pitcher Stan Coveleski gives up a run on five hits and one walk, while striking out three in a complete game effort, while his battery-mate Steve O'Neill led the attack with two doubles and two runs batted in. Rube Marquard is the losing pitcher.
- October 6 – The Brooklyn Robins even the World Series at a game apiece with a 3–0 shutout against the visiting Cleveland Indians. Burleigh Grimes is credited with the shoutout, holding Cleveland to only seven hits and four walks while striking out two. Brooklyn right fielder Tommy Griffith goes 2-for-4 with two RBI. Jim Bagby, the losing pitcher, gave up three runs and seven hits in six innings of work.
- October 7 – The host Brooklyn Robins beat the Cleveland Indians, 2–1, to take a 2–1 advantage in the World Series. The Robins took an early 2–0 lead in the bottom of the first inning, when leadoff hitter Ivy Olson walked and Tommy Griffith reached base on an error, followed by RBI-singles by Zack Wheat and Hy Myers. The only Cleveland run came in the fourth, after Tris Speaker doubled to left field and scored on an error. Robins' starter Sherry Smith pitched all the way, giving up an unearned run on three hits and two walks, while striking out two. Ray Caldwell was credited with the loss.
- October 9 – The Cleveland Indians even the World Series at two games a piece, with a 5–1 victory against the Brooklyn Robins at League Park. For the second time pitcher Stan Coveleski silenced the Brooklyn hitters for nine innings, giving up a run on five hits while striking out four and walking one. Bill Wambsganss hit 2-for-4 with an RBI and scored twice, while Tris Speaker went 2-for-5 with two runs and George Burns drove in two runs. Coveleski helped himself with a single and a run, while Larry Gardner and Elmer Smith drove in a run apiece. The only Brooklyn damage came in the fourth inning after a single by Jimmy Johnston and a RBI-double from Tommy Griffith. The Robins used four pitchers, as starter Leon Cadore lasted just one inning and was credited with the loss.
- October 10 – At League Park, the Cleveland Indians beat the Brooklyn Robins 8–1 in Game 5 of the World Series to take a 3–2 lead in the Classic, in one of the most unusual games in Series history. This game recorded the only triple play ever made in postseason play, the first Series grand slam, and the first Series home run hit by a pitcher. The triple play was unassisted and turned by Cleveland second baseman Bill Wambsganss, while the grand slam was hit by Indians outfielder Elmer Smith and the home run belted by Cleveland starter Jim Bagby, who earned the victory. Beside this, Brooklyn outhit Cleveland, 13-to-12, in a lost cause. Burleigh Grimes was charged with the loss.
- October 11 – The Cleveland Indians put themselves one win away from their first World Championship title, after beating the Brooklyn Robins, 1–0, in Game 6 of the World Series at Cleveland League Park. Facing his former team, Duster Mails pitched a sterling three-hit shutout with four strikeouts and two walks. The only run of the game came in the bottom of the sixth inning, when Tris Speaker hit a two-out single and scored on a double by George Burns. The lack of run support by the Robins made a hard-luck loser out of their starter Sherry Smith, who gave up a run on seven hits in a complete-game defeat.
- October 12 – The Cleveland Indians defeated the visiting Brooklyn Robins, 3–0, in Game 7 of the World Series, to clinch their first World Championship five games to two. Stan Coveleski earned the shutout and his third victory of the Series, limiting the Robins to five hits and striking out one without walks, to reach a minuscule 0.67 ERA in three complete games. The Indians scored his first run in the bottom of the fourth inning, when Larry Gardner singled and scored on a two-out error. An inning later, Charlie Jamieson singled and scored on a two-out triple by Tris Speaker. The last run came in the seventh, when Coveleski scored on a double by Jamieson. Burleigh Grimes was the loser, after allowing all three runs on seven hits in seven innings.
- October 22 – Eight members of the Chicago White Sox are indicted for supposedly throwing the 1919 World Series. Although considered heavy favorites to win the Series, the White Sox lost to the Cincinnati Reds in eight games.
- November 12 – MLB owners unanimously elect Kenesaw Mountain Landis as sole commissioner of Major League Baseball for seven years, abolishing the National Baseball Commission. The owners' action comes in direct response to the Black Sox Scandal, which threatens the integrity of the game. Landis agreed on the condition that he would be the sole commissioner, with final authority over the players and owners. Landis remains a federal judge with his $7,500 federal salary deducted from the baseball salary of $50,000.

== Births ==
=== January ===
- January 2 – Cliff Dapper
- January 4 – Walter Ockey
- January 6 – Early Wynn
- January 7 – Dixie Howell
- January 8 – Bert Kuczynski
- January 10 – Max Patkin
- January 15 – Steve Gromek
- January 16 – Ray Poole
- January 16 – Roy Talcott
- January 17 – Jay Heard
- January 20 – Sam Hairston
- January 26 – Dick Mauney
- January 27 – Eddie Shokes

=== February ===
- February 2 – Zeb Eaton
- February 8 – Buddy Blattner
- February 11 – Boyd Bartley
- February 14 – Marie Kazmierczak
- February 17 – Gertrude Ganote
- February 20 – Frankie Gustine
- February 22 – Karl Drews
- February 23 – Roy Valdés
- February 26 – Danny Gardella
- February 27 – Connie Ryan

=== March ===
- March 3 – Dick Adkins
- March 9 – James Bizzle
- March 13 – Frank Biscan
- March 18 – Mickey Rutner
- March 20 – Twila Shively
- March 21 – Mabel Holle
- March 23 – Tetsuharu Kawakami
- March 25 – Sam Lowry
- March 27 – Joe Tuminelli
- March 28 – Fred Hancock
- March 28 – Babe Martin
- March 30 – Irene Ruhnke
- March 31 – Dave Koslo

=== April ===
- April 8 – Dick Adams
- April 19 – John O'Neil
- April 24 – Dixie Howell
- April 26 – Ron Northey
- April 28 – Red Treadway

=== May ===
- May 3 – Dan Bankhead
- May 10 – Mickey Grasso
- May 11 – Gene Hermanski
- May 16 – Dave Philley
- May 20 – Helen Fox
- May 22 – Pinky Woods
- May 23 – Francisco José Cróquer
- May 24 – Vern Curtis

=== June ===
- June 9 – Sal Madrid
- June 10 – Johnny Podgajny
- June 12 – Jim Colzie
- June 13 – Héctor Rodríguez
- June 16 – Eddie Malone
- June 20 – Red Barbary
- June 22 – Walt Masterson
- June 23 – Deacon Donahue
- June 26 – Jean-Pierre Roy
- June 28 – Bert Shepard

=== July ===
- July 1 – Paul Lehner
- July 3 – Al Montgomery
- July 3 – Paul O'Dea
- July 6 – Jay Avrea
- July 13 – Frank Hiller
- July 14 – Bryan Stephens
- July 15 – Theresa Kobuszewski
- July 16 – Larry Jansen
- July 18 – Eddie Kazak
- July 26 – Eddie Bockman
- July 26 – Sibby Sisti
- July 29 – Erv Dusak
- July 31 – Fred Bradley

=== August ===
- August 3 – Jim Hegan
- August 3 – Vic Johnson
- August 4 – Bob Keegan
- August 5 – Eddie Lukon
- August 17 – Vern Bickford
- August 18 – Bob Kennedy
- August 21 – Ben Cardoni
- August 21 – Whitey Platt
- August 21 – Gerry Staley
- August 23 – Kaoru Betto

=== September ===
- September 3 – Sandy Consuegra
- September 4 – Catherine Bennett
- September 5 – Gene Bearden
- September 9 – George Kissell
- September 12 – Andy Seminick
- September 13 – Ed Sudol
- September 18 – Paul Gillespie
- September 18 – Ed Hanyzewski
- September 22 – Larry Eschen
- September 22 – Bob Lemon
- September 23 – Marino Pieretti
- September 24 – Otis Davis
- September 30 – Lyman Linde

=== October ===
- October 2 – Joe B. Scott
- October 2 – Spec Shea
- October 8 – George Metkovich
- October 20 – Pat McGlothin
- October 20 – Bill Ramsey
- October 22 – Jim Hickey
- October 23 – Vern Stephens
- October 26 – Bud Byerly
- October 28 – Artie Wilson
- October 29 – Lenna Arnold

=== November ===
- November 2 – Dick Sisler
- November 2 – John Sullivan
- November 4 – Val Heim
- November 8 – Wally Westlake
- November 9 – Bill Mueller
- November 9 – Homer Spragins
- November 9 – Dick Whitman
- November 10 – Russ Kerns
- November 11 – Joe Murray
- November 21 – Stan Musial
- November 23 – Jake Jones
- November 26 – Bud Sheely
- November 27 – Johnny Schmitz

=== December ===
- December 1 – Charlie Ripple
- December 2 – Beatrice Arbour
- December 6 – Gus Niarhos
- December 15 – Eddie Robinson
- December 17 – Mike Schultz
- December 20 – Julio González
- December 21 – Bill Werle
- December 27 – Dutch McCall
- December 28 – Leslie Aulds

== Deaths ==
=== January–March ===
- February 2 – Frank Quinn, 43, outfielder for the 1899 Chicago Orphans of the National League.
- February 5 – Tom Catterson, 35, outfielder who played from 1908 through 1909 for the Brooklyn Superbas of the National League.
- February 5 – Ed Siever, 44, pitcher who posted an 83–83 record and a 2.60 earned run average for the Detroit Tigers and St. Louis Browns, while leading the American League pitchers with 1.91 ERA in 1902.
- February 6 – Jack Lapp, 35, backup catcher who hit .263 in nine seasons for the Philadelphia Athletics (1908–1915) and Chicago White Sox.
- February 11 – Ray Boyd, 33, pitcher who played from 1910 to 1911 with the AL St. Louis Browns and NL Cincinnati Reds.
- February 12 – Mike Goodfellow, 53, National League outfielder for the 1887 St. Louis Browns and the 1888 Cleveland Blues.
- February 13 – John Shoupe, 68, pitcher and infielder in part of three seasons for the Troy Trojans (NL, 1879), St. Louis Brown Stockings (AA, 1882) and Washington Nationals (UA, 1884).
- February 14 – Andy Sullivan, 35, shortstop for the 1904 Boston Beaneaters of the National League.
- March 1 – Harry Jordan, 47, pitcher who went 1–2 with a 4.15 ERA for the Pittsburgh Pirates from 1894 to 1895.
- March 5 – Alex Farmer, 42, catcher for the 1908 Brooklyn Superbas of the National League.
- March 10 – Charlie Briggs, 59, second baseman and outfielder who played for the Chicago Browns of the Union Association during the 1884 season.
- March 11 – Ed Poole, 44, National League pitcher who played from 1902 through 1904 for the Pittsburgh Pirates, Cincinnati Reds and Brooklyn Superbas.

=== April–June ===
- April 2 – Matty McIntyre, 39, outfielder for the Philadelphia Athletics, Detroit Tigers and Chicago White Sox between 1901 and 1912, who led the American League in runs, singles and times on base in the 1908 season.
- April 3 – Aaron S. Stern, c. 65, executive with the Cincinnati Red Stockings during the 1880s.
- April 18 – George McMillan, 56, Canadian outfielder for the 1890 New York Giants of the National League.
- May 1 – Joe Leonard, 25, third baseman for the Pittsburgh Pirates, Cleveland Indians, and Washington Senators between the 1914 and 1920 seasons.
- May 8 – Bill McTigue, 27, pitcher who went 2–5 in 27 games with the Boston Rustlers/Braves (1911/1912–1913) and Detroit Tigers (1916).
- May 23 – Doc Kennedy, 66, National League catcher who hit .260 in 160 games for the Cleveland Blues and Buffalo Bisons from 1879 to 1883.
- June 10 – Martin Flaherty, 66, sporting goods dealer who came out of the stands to play one game for the 1881 Worcester Ruby Legs.
- June 19 – Ed Barry, 37, pitcher for the Boston Americans from 1905 through 1907.

=== July–September ===
- July 19 – John Hinton, 44, third baseman for the 1901 Boston Beaneaters of the National League.
- July 20 – Bill O'Neill, 40, Canadian shortstop for the Boston Americans, Washington Senators and Chicago White Sox between 1904 and 1906, who committed six errors in a single game in 1904 to become the only 20th-century big-leaguer to accomplish this dubious feat.
- July 23 – Buttercup Dickerson, 62, outfielder for eight teams from 1878 to 1885. Officially the first Italian American to play Major League Baseball.
- August 1 – Frank Norton, 75, outfielder/third baseman for the 1871 Washington Olympics of the National Association.
- August 4 – Frank Fennelly, 60, shortstop for four different teams from 1884 to 1890, who led the National League for the most RBI in 1885.
- August 12 – Elmer Horton, 48, pitcher for the 1896 Pittsburgh Pirates and the 1898 Brooklyn Bridegrooms of the National League.
- August 17 – Ray Chapman, 29, shortstop for the Cleveland Indians since 1912 who batted .300 three times, led American League in runs and walks in 1918.
- August 27 – Toby Lyons, 51, pitcher for the 1890 Syracuse Stars of the American Association.
- August 29 – Jimmy Peoples, 56, catcher who played from 1884 through 1889 for the Cincinnati Red Stockings, Brooklyn Grays/Bridegrooms and Columbus Solons.
- August 31 – John Ricks, 52, third baseman for the St. Louis Browns of the National League in the 1891 and 1894 seasons.
- September 5 – Jerry Turbidy, 68, shortstop who played for the Kansas City Cowboys of the Union Association in 1884.
- September 11 – Bill Hallman, 53, second baseman, mainly with the Phillies, who batted .300 and scored 100 runs four times each.
- September 17 – Charlie Eden, 65, outfielder in parts of four parts for the Chicago White Stockings, Cleveland Blues, and Pittsburgh Alleghenys, who led the National League in total bases and extrabase hits in 1879.
- September 23 – Doc Curley, 46, second baseman for the 1899 Chicago Orphans of the National League.
- September 28 – Phil Reardon, 36, outfielder for the 1906 Brooklyn Superbas of the National League.
- September 29 – Mark Creegan, 50, outfielder for the 1884 Washington Nationals of the Union Association.

=== October–December ===
- October 2 – Walter Hackett, 63, shortstop who played for the 1884 Boston Reds in the Union Association and the 1885 Boston Beaneaters in the National League.
- October 9 – Carl Vandagrift, 37, utility infielder for the 1914 Indianapolis Hoosiers of the Federal League.
- November 30 – Lou Meyers, 60, catcher/outfielder for the 1884 Cincinnati Outlaw Reds of the Union Association.
- December 9 – George Browne, 44, outfielder for seven different teams in a span of eleven seasons, and a member of the 1905 New York Giants World Champions.
- December 16 – Dick Bayless, 37, right fielder for the Cincinnati Reds in 1908.
- December 27 – Harvey Cushman, 43, pitcher for the 1902 Pittsburgh Pirates.
