= 1914 Pittsburgh Pirates season =

1914 Pittsburgh Pirates
- League: National League
- Ballpark: Forbes Field
- City: Pittsburgh, Pennsylvania
- Owners: Barney Dreyfuss
- Managers: Fred Clarke

The 1914 Pittsburgh Pirates season was the 33rd season of the Pittsburgh Pirates franchise; the 28th in the National League. The Pirates finished seventh in the league standings with a record of 69–85. It was the Pirates first losing season since 1898.

== Regular season ==
=== Season standings ===
National League
| Team | W | L | Pct. | GB | Home | Road |
|---|---|---|---|---|---|---|
| Boston Braves | 94 | 59 | .614 | — | 51‍–‍25 | 43‍–‍34 |
| New York Giants | 84 | 70 | .545 | 10½ | 43‍–‍36 | 41‍–‍34 |
| St. Louis Cardinals | 81 | 72 | .529 | 13 | 42‍–‍34 | 39‍–‍38 |
| Chicago Cubs | 78 | 76 | .506 | 16½ | 46‍–‍30 | 32‍–‍46 |
| Brooklyn Robins | 75 | 79 | .487 | 19½ | 45‍–‍34 | 30‍–‍45 |
| Philadelphia Phillies | 74 | 80 | .481 | 20½ | 48‍–‍30 | 26‍–‍50 |
| Pittsburgh Pirates | 69 | 85 | .448 | 25½ | 39‍–‍36 | 30‍–‍49 |
| Cincinnati Reds | 60 | 94 | .390 | 34½ | 34‍–‍42 | 26‍–‍52 |

=== Record vs. opponents ===
1914 National League record Sources:
| Team | BSN | BRO | CHC | CIN | NYG | PHI | PIT | STL |
|---|---|---|---|---|---|---|---|---|
| Boston | — | 9–13 | 16–6 | 14–8–2 | 11–11–1 | 12–10 | 17–5–1 | 15–6–1 |
| Brooklyn | 13–9 | — | 10–12 | 11–11 | 9–13 | 11–11 | 16–6 | 5–17 |
| Chicago | 6–16 | 12–10 | — | 17–5 | 9–13 | 12–10 | 12–10 | 10–12–2 |
| Cincinnati | 8–14–2 | 11–11 | 5–17 | — | 9–13 | 9–13 | 8–14–1 | 10–12 |
| New York | 11–11–1 | 13–9 | 13–9 | 13–9 | — | 12–10 | 13–9–1 | 9–13 |
| Philadelphia | 10–12 | 11–11 | 10–12 | 13–9 | 10–12 | — | 12–10 | 8–14 |
| Pittsburgh | 5–17–1 | 6–16 | 10–12 | 14–8–1 | 9–13–1 | 10–12 | — | 15–7–1 |
| St. Louis | 6–15–1 | 17–5 | 12–10–2 | 12–10 | 13–9 | 14–8 | 7–15–1 | — |

=== Game log ===
1914 Game Log: 69–85 (Home: 39–36; Away: 30–49)
April: 10–2 (Home: 1–1; Away: 9–1)

| # | Date | Opponent | Score | Win | Loss | Save | Attendance | Record |
|---|---|---|---|---|---|---|---|---|
| 1 | April 14 | @ Cardinals | 1–2 | Griner | **Adams** (0–1) | — | — | 0–1 |
| 2 | April 15 | @ Cardinals | 5–1 | **Cooper** (1–0) | Sallee | — | — | 1–1 |
| 3 | April 16 | @ Cardinals | 4–1 | **McQuillan** (1–0) | Hageman | — | — | 2–1 |
| 4 | April 17 | @ Cardinals | 2–0 | **Kantlehner** (1–0) | Perritt | — | — | 3–1 |
| 5 | April 18 | @ Reds | 8–5 | **Conzelman** (1–0) | Rowan | — | 7,500 | 4–1 |
| 6 | April 19 | @ Reds | 9–3 | **Cooper** (2–0) | Benton | **McQuillan** (1) | 10,000 | 5–1 |
| 7 | April 21 | @ Reds | 5–2 | **McQuillan** (2–0) | Yingling | — | — | 6–1 |
| 8 | April 23 | Cardinals | 5–1 | **Adams** (1–1) | Hageman | — | 20,000 | 7–1 |
| 9 | April 24 | Cardinals | 1–8 | Perritt | **Harmon** (0–1) | — | — | 7–2 |
| 10 | April 26 | @ Cubs | 6–4 | **Conzelman** (2–0) | Lavender | **McQuillan** (2) | 12,000 | 8–2 |
| 11 | April 28 | @ Cubs | 5–2 | **McQuillan** (3–0) | Humphries | — | — | 9–2 |
| 12 | April 29 | @ Cubs | 7–0 | **Adams** (2–1) | Lavender | — | 1,000 | 10–2 |

May: 11–12 (Home: 10–10; Away: 1–2)

| # | Date | Opponent | Score | Win | Loss | Save | Attendance | Record |
|---|---|---|---|---|---|---|---|---|
| 13 | May 1 | Reds | 4–2 | **Conzelman** (3–0) | Benton | **McQuillan** (3) | 4,000 | 11–2 |
| 14 | May 2 | Reds | 7–5 | **Cooper** (3–0) | Douglas | **Adams** (1) | — | 12–2 |
| 15 | May 3 | @ Reds | 3–1 (11) | **McQuillan** (4–0) | Ames | — | 15,000 | 13–2 |
| 16 | May 6 | Cubs | 1–0 | **Adams** (3–1) | Cheney | — | — | 14–2 |
| 17 | May 7 | Cubs | 7–1 | **Cooper** (4–0) | Humphries | — | — | 15–2 |
| 18 | May 9 | Cubs | 2–10 | Lavender | **Conzelman** (3–1) | — | 9,000 | 15–3 |
| 19 | May 10 | @ Cubs | 1–4 | Cheney | **McQuillan** (4–1) | — | 9,000 | 15–4 |
| 20 | May 12 | Braves | 1–1 (10) | | | — | — | 15–4 |
| 21 | May 14 | Giants | 3–4 | Demaree | **Adams** (3–2) | — | 10,000 | 15–5 |
| 22 | May 15 | Giants | 3–5 | Mathewson | **McQuillan** (4–2) | — | — | 15–6 |
| 23 | May 16 | Giants | 0–2 | Tesreau | **Cooper** (4–1) | — | — | 15–7 |
| 24 | May 18 | Braves | 1–4 | James | **Adams** (3–3) | — | — | 15–8 |
| 25 | May 19 | Braves | 7–5 | **Harmon** (1–1) | Cocreham | — | 2,000 | 16–8 |
| 26 | May 20 | Braves | 4–1 | **Cooper** (5–1) | Luque | — | — | 17–8 |
| 27 | May 21 | Phillies | 6–2 | **Harmon** (2–1) | Mayer | — | 3,000 | 18–8 |
| 28 | May 22 | Phillies | 8–2 | **Adams** (4–3) | Marshall | — | — | 19–8 |
| 29 | May 23 | Phillies | 7–2 | **McQuillan** (5–2) | Oeschger | — | — | 20–8 |
| 30 | May 25 | Robins | 5–4 | **Cooper** (6–1) | Wagner | — | — | 21–8 |
| 31 | May 26 | Robins | 2–3 | Reulbach | **Adams** (4–4) | — | — | 21–9 |
| 32 | May 28 | Phillies | 0–2 | Mayer | **Harmon** (2–2) | — | — | 21–10 |
| 33 | May 29 | Reds | 2–3 | Douglas | **McQuillan** (5–3) | — | — | 21–11 |
| 34 | May 30 | Reds | 2–3 | Yingling | **Cooper** (6–2) | Ames | — | 21–12 |
| 35 | May 30 | Reds | 0–3 | Davenport | **Adams** (4–5) | — | — | 21–13 |
| 36 | May 31 | @ Reds | 1–2 | Ames | **Harmon** (2–3) | — | — | 21–14 |
| 37 | May 31 | @ Reds | 5–5 | | | — | 26,000 | 21–14 |

June: 9–17 (Home: 3–2; Away: 6–15)

| # | Date | Opponent | Score | Win | Loss | Save | Attendance | Record |
|---|---|---|---|---|---|---|---|---|
| 38 | June 1 | @ Cubs | 3–7 | Cheney | **O'Toole** (0–1) | — | 2,500 | 21–15 |
| 39 | June 2 | @ Cubs | 3–7 | Pierce | **Adams** (4–6) | — | — | 21–16 |
| 40 | June 3 | Cubs | 5–6 | Humphries | **Harmon** (2–4) | Cheney | — | 21–17 |
| 41 | June 5 | @ Phillies | 3–13 | Mayer | **McQuillan** (5–4) | — | — | 21–18 |
| 42 | June 6 | @ Phillies | 5–2 | **Adams** (5–6) | Marshall | — | — | 22–18 |
| 43 | June 8 | @ Phillies | 7–5 | **Harmon** (3–4) | Alexander | **McQuillan** (4) | — | 23–18 |
| 44 | June 9 | @ Phillies | 1–3 | Mayer | **Conzelman** (3–2) | — | — | 23–19 |
| 45 | June 10 | @ Braves | 2–11 | Rudolph | **Cooper** (6–3) | — | — | 23–20 |
| 46 | June 11 | @ Braves | 2–3 | James | **Adams** (5–7) | — | — | 23–21 |
| 47 | June 12 | @ Braves | 3–5 | Perdue | **McQuillan** (5–5) | — | — | 23–22 |
| 48 | June 13 | @ Braves | 3–4 | Tyler | **Cooper** (6–4) | — | — | 23–23 |
| 49 | June 15 | @ Giants | 3–2 | **Adams** (6–7) | Marquard | — | — | 24–23 |
| 50 | June 16 | @ Giants | 0–3 | Tesreau | **Harmon** (3–5) | — | — | 24–24 |
| 51 | June 17 | @ Giants | 0–5 | Mathewson | **McQuillan** (5–6) | — | — | 24–25 |
| 52 | June 18 | @ Giants | 4–3 | **Harmon** (4–5) | Demaree | — | 18,000 | 25–25 |
| 53 | June 20 | @ Robins | 4–3 | **Cooper** (7–4) | Reulbach | — | — | 26–25 |
| 54 | June 22 | @ Robins | 1–5 | Pfeffer | **Harmon** (4–6) | — | — | 26–26 |
| 55 | June 23 | @ Robins | 1–2 | Rucker | **Cooper** (7–5) | — | — | 26–27 |
| 56 | June 24 | Cardinals | 0–3 | Doak | **Adams** (6–8) | — | — | 26–28 |
| 57 | June 25 | Cardinals | 4–1 | **Conzelman** (4–2) | Perritt | — | — | 27–28 |
| 58 | June 26 | Cardinals | 3–2 (10) | **McQuillan** (6–6) | Sallee | — | — | 28–28 |
| 59 | June 27 | Cardinals | 4–2 (7) | **Harmon** (5–6) | Griner | — | — | 29–28 |
| 60 | June 28 | @ Reds | 6–7 | Rowan | **McQuillan** (6–7) | — | — | 29–29 |
| 61 | June 28 | @ Reds | 0–1 | Schneider | **O'Toole** (0–2) | — | — | 29–30 |
| 62 | June 29 | @ Cardinals | 4–1 | **Cooper** (8–5) | Perritt | — | — | 30–30 |
| 63 | June 30 | @ Cardinals | 0–1 | Sallee | **Harmon** (5–7) | — | — | 30–31 |

July: 9–18 (Home: 7–13; Away: 2–5)

| # | Date | Opponent | Score | Win | Loss | Save | Attendance | Record |
|---|---|---|---|---|---|---|---|---|
| 64 | July 1 | @ Cardinals | 1–5 | Hageman | **Conzelman** (4–3) | — | — | 30–32 |
| 65 | July 3 | Cubs | 2–1 | **O'Toole** (1–2) | Lavender | — | — | 31–32 |
| 66 | July 4 | Cubs | 0–1 | Vaughn | **Adams** (6–9) | — | — | 31–33 |
| 67 | July 4 | Cubs | 2–4 | Cheney | **Cooper** (8–6) | — | — | 31–34 |
| 68 | July 5 | @ Cubs | 4–5 (10) | Smith | **O'Toole** (1–3) | — | — | 31–35 |
| 69 | July 7 | Giants | 5–2 | **Adams** (7–9) | Marquard | — | — | 32–35 |
| 70 | July 8 | Phillies | 7–10 | Marshall | **O'Toole** (1–4) | Oeschger | — | 32–36 |
| 71 | July 9 | Phillies | 0–1 | Tincup | **McQuillan** (6–8) | — | — | 32–37 |
| 72 | July 10 | Phillies | 2–5 | Matteson | **Harmon** (5–8) | — | — | 32–38 |
| 73 | July 11 | Phillies | 3–1 | **Mamaux** (1–0) | Rixey | — | — | 33–38 |
| 74 | July 15 | Robins | 4–3 | **Cooper** (9–6) | Allen | — | — | 34–38 |
| 75 | July 16 | Robins | 3–4 | Rucker | **Mamaux** (1–1) | Ragan | — | 34–39 |
| 76 | July 16 | Robins | 2–5 | Pfeffer | **Kantlehner** (1–1) | — | — | 34–40 |
| 77 | July 17 | Giants | 1–3 (21) | Marquard | **Adams** (7–10) | — | — | 34–41 |
| 78 | July 18 | Giants | 3–0 | **Harmon** (6–8) | Demaree | — | — | 35–41 |
| 79 | July 18 | Giants | 5–6 (10) | Mathewson | **McQuillan** (6–9) | — | 20,000 | 35–42 |
| 80 | July 20 | Braves | 0–1 | Tyler | **Cooper** (9–7) | James | — | 35–43 |
| 81 | July 21 | Braves | 0–6 | Rudolph | **O'Toole** (1–5) | — | — | 35–44 |
| 82 | July 22 | Braves | 0–1 (11) | James | **Harmon** (6–9) | — | — | 35–45 |
| 83 | July 22 | Braves | 8–4 | **Mamaux** (2–1) | Crutcher | — | — | 36–45 |
| 84 | July 23 | Braves | 0–2 | Tyler | **Cooper** (9–8) | — | — | 36–46 |
| 85 | July 24 | Phillies | 3–2 | **McQuillan** (7–9) | Mayer | — | — | 37–46 |
| 86 | July 25 | @ Giants | 2–4 | Mathewson | **Adams** (7–11) | — | 20,000 | 37–47 |
| 87 | July 27 | @ Giants | 3–1 | **Harmon** (7–9) | Marquard | — | 5,000 | 38–47 |
| 88 | July 29 | @ Giants | 0–1 | Tesreau | **McQuillan** (7–10) | — | — | 38–48 |
| 89 | July 30 | @ Robins | 7–2 | **Cooper** (10–8) | Allen | — | — | 39–48 |
| 90 | July 31 | @ Robins | 3–9 | Ragan | **Harmon** (7–10) | — | — | 39–49 |

August: 13–14 (Home: 9–8; Away: 4–6)

| # | Date | Opponent | Score | Win | Loss | Save | Attendance | Record |
|---|---|---|---|---|---|---|---|---|
| 91 | August 1 | @ Robins | 1–7 | Pfeffer | **Adams** (7–12) | — | — | 39–50 |
| 92 | August 1 | @ Robins | 1–10 | Reulbach | **O'Toole** (1–6) | — | 10,000 | 39–51 |
| 93 | August 3 | @ Robins | 7–3 (13) | **Cooper** (11–8) | Ragan | — | 1,000 | 40–51 |
| 94 | August 4 | @ Braves | 0–1 | Rudolph | **Harmon** (7–11) | — | — | 40–52 |
| 95 | August 5 | @ Braves | 0–4 | James | **O'Toole** (1–7) | — | — | 40–53 |
| 96 | August 6 | @ Braves | 4–5 (10) | Strand | **Adams** (7–13) | — | 9,000 | 40–54 |
| 97 | August 7 | @ Braves | 5–1 | **Cooper** (12–8) | Cottrell | — | 8,000 | 41–54 |
| 98 | August 8 | @ Phillies | 4–3 | **McQuillan** (8–10) | Mayer | **Conzelman** (1) | — | 42–54 |
| 99 | August 10 | @ Phillies | 4–2 | **Harmon** (8–11) | Tincup | — | — | 43–54 |
| 100 | August 11 | @ Phillies | 4–5 | Alexander | **Conzelman** (4–4) | — | 1,000 | 43–55 |
| 101 | August 13 | Cardinals | 2–1 | **Cooper** (13–8) | Griner | — | — | 44–55 |
| 102 | August 13 | Cardinals | 5–2 | **Adams** (8–13) | Perritt | — | — | 45–55 |
| 103 | August 14 | Reds | 8–7 | **McQuillan** (9–10) | Douglas | **Harmon** (1) | — | 46–55 |
| 104 | August 15 | Reds | 2–0 | **Conzelman** (5–4) | Ames | — | — | 47–55 |
| 105 | August 17 | Giants | 3–7 | Tesreau | **Harmon** (8–12) | Fromme | 5,000 | 47–56 |
| 106 | August 18 | Giants | 3–1 | **Adams** (9–13) | Marquard | — | 3,000 | 48–56 |
| 107 | August 19 | Giants | 5–1 | **Cooper** (14–8) | Demaree | **McQuillan** (5) | — | 49–56 |
| 108 | August 20 | Braves | 3–6 | Rudolph | **O'Toole** (1–8) | — | — | 49–57 |
| 109 | August 22 | Braves | 3–2 (12) | **Harmon** (9–12) | James | — | — | 50–57 |
| 110 | August 22 | Braves | 2–4 | Hess | **Adams** (9–14) | — | — | 50–58 |
| 111 | August 24 | Phillies | 2–3 | Marshall | **McQuillan** (9–11) | Mayer | — | 50–59 |
| 112 | August 25 | Phillies | 2–0 | **Mamaux** (3–1) | Alexander | — | — | 51–59 |
| 113 | August 26 | Robins | 1–2 | Pfeffer | **Cooper** (14–9) | — | — | 51–60 |
| 114 | August 26 | Robins | 2–4 | Ragan | **Adams** (9–15) | — | — | 51–61 |
| 115 | August 27 | Robins | 0–1 (10) | Reulbach | **Harmon** (9–13) | — | — | 51–62 |
| 116 | August 29 | Robins | 1–0 (13) | **Mamaux** (4–1) | Pfeffer | — | — | 52–62 |
| 117 | August 29 | Robins | 4–5 | Ragan | **Cooper** (14–10) | — | 1,500 | 52–63 |
| 118 | August 31 | Giants | 1–1 (11) | | | — | — | 52–63 |

September: 12–20 (Home: 6–2; Away: 6–18)

| # | Date | Opponent | Score | Win | Loss | Save | Attendance | Record |
|---|---|---|---|---|---|---|---|---|
| 119 | September 2 | @ Cardinals | 4–1 | **McQuillan** (10–11) | Perritt | — | — | 53–63 |
| 120 | September 2 | @ Cardinals | 1–1 (11) | | | — | — | 53–63 |
| 121 | September 3 | @ Cardinals | 11–6 | **Cooper** (15–10) | Perdue | **Harmon** (2) | — | 54–63 |
| 122 | September 3 | @ Cardinals | 10–3 (8) | **Kantlehner** (2–1) | Griner | — | — | 55–63 |
| 123 | September 4 | @ Cardinals | 2–1 | **Harmon** (10–13) | Sallee | — | — | 56–63 |
| 124 | September 5 | @ Cubs | 2–3 | Zabel | **McQuillan** (10–12) | — | — | 56–64 |
| 125 | September 6 | @ Cubs | 3–8 | Vaughn | **Adams** (9–16) | — | 8,000 | 56–65 |
| 126 | September 7 | Cardinals | 4–7 | Doak | **Mamaux** (4–2) | — | — | 56–66 |
| 127 | September 7 | Cardinals | 2–1 | **Harmon** (11–13) | Sallee | — | — | 57–66 |
| 128 | September 9 | Cubs | 5–1 | **McQuillan** (11–12) | Cheney | — | — | 58–66 |
| 129 | September 10 | Cubs | 4–2 | **Cooper** (16–10) | Vaughn | — | — | 59–66 |
| 130 | September 12 | Cubs | 5–4 | **Adams** (10–16) | Lavender | — | — | 60–66 |
| 131 | September 12 | Cubs | 4–0 | **Kantlehner** (3–1) | Humphries | — | — | 61–66 |
| 132 | September 13 | @ Cubs | 0–2 | Cheney | **Harmon** (11–14) | — | 4,000 | 61–67 |
| 133 | September 14 | @ Cubs | 4–7 | Vaughn | **McQuillan** (11–13) | — | — | 61–68 |
| 134 | September 15 | Reds | 9–0 | **Adams** (11–16) | Benton | — | — | 62–68 |
| 135 | September 16 | @ Phillies | 2–6 | Rixey | **Cooper** (16–11) | — | 1,000 | 62–69 |
| 136 | September 17 | @ Phillies | 3–6 | Matteson | **Harmon** (11–15) | — | — | 62–70 |
| 137 | September 17 | @ Phillies | 0–2 | Tincup | **McQuillan** (11–14) | — | — | 62–71 |
| 138 | September 18 | @ Phillies | 4–6 | Oeschger | **Kantlehner** (3–2) | — | — | 62–72 |
| 139 | September 19 | @ Braves | 3–9 | Davis | **Cooper** (16–12) | Tyler | — | 62–73 |
| 140 | September 21 | @ Braves | 5–6 | Rudolph | **Harmon** (11–16) | — | — | 62–74 |
| 141 | September 22 | @ Braves | 2–8 | Tyler | **McQuillan** (11–15) | — | — | 62–75 |
| 142 | September 23 | @ Robins | 1–5 | Pfeffer | **Cooper** (16–13) | — | — | 62–76 |
| 143 | September 23 | @ Robins | 2–5 | Rucker | **Conzelman** (5–5) | — | — | 62–77 |
| 144 | September 24 | @ Robins | 2–3 | Aitchison | **McQuillan** (11–16) | — | — | 62–78 |
| 145 | September 25 | @ Robins | 2–3 | Schmutz | **Kelly** (0–1) | — | — | 62–79 |
| 146 | September 26 | @ Giants | 2–4 | Tesreau | **Harmon** (11–17) | — | — | 62–80 |
| 147 | September 26 | @ Giants | 4–2 | **Adams** (12–16) | Mathewson | — | 10,000 | 63–80 |
| 148 | September 28 | @ Giants | 2–5 | Fromme | **McQuillan** (11–17) | — | — | 63–81 |
| 149 | September 28 | @ Giants | 6–13 (6) | Marquard | **Cooper** (16–14) | — | — | 63–82 |
| 150 | September 29 | @ Giants | 5–2 | **Harmon** (12–17) | Wiltse | — | 500 | 64–82 |
| 151 | September 30 | Cardinals | 0–1 | Doak | **Cooper** (16–15) | — | — | 64–83 |

October: 5–2 (Home: 3–0; Away: 2–2)

| # | Date | Opponent | Score | Win | Loss | Save | Attendance | Record |
|---|---|---|---|---|---|---|---|---|
| 152 | October 1 | Reds | 5–1 | **Adams** (13–16) | Ames | — | — | 65–83 |
| 153 | October 2 | Reds | 2–1 | **McQuillan** (12–17) | Douglas | — | — | 66–83 |
| 154 | October 3 | Reds | 1–0 | **Harmon** (13–17) | Lear | — | 2,000 | 67–83 |
| 155 | October 4 | @ Reds | 4–5 | Douglas | **Conzelman** (5–6) | — | — | 67–84 |
| 156 | October 4 | @ Reds | 11–4 (6) | **Mamaux** (5–2) | Benton | — | — | 68–84 |
| 157 | October 5 | @ Reds | 4–3 | **McQuillan** (13–17) | Ames | — | — | 69–84 |
| 158 | October 5 | @ Reds | 1–4 (7) | Schneider | **Kelly** (0–2) | — | 300 | 69–85 |

Legend: = Win = Loss = Tie
Bold = Pirates team member

=== Roster ===
1914 Pittsburgh Pirates
**Roster**
| **Pitchers**: Babe Adams; Pat Bohen; Joe Conzelman; Wilbur Cooper; Bob Harmon; Erv Kantlehner; Herb Kelly; Al Mamaux; Dixie McArthur; George McQuillan; Marty O'Toole | **Catchers**: Sam Brenegan; Bob Coleman; George Gibson; Jake Kafora; Pat Kilhullen; Bobby Schang; Syd Smith; Bill Wagner; **Infielders**: Wally Gerber; Ham Hyatt; Ed Konetchy; Joe Leonard; Ike McAuley; Alex McCarthy; Mike Mowrey; Paddy Siglin; Jim Viox; Honus Wagner | **Outfielders**: Clarence Berger; Max Carey; Zip Collins; Dan Costello; Jim Kelly; Joe Kelly; Ed Mensor; Mike Mitchell; Fritz Scheeren; **Other batters**: Fred Clarke; Pete Falsey; Ralph Shafer | **Manager**: Fred Clarke |

== Player stats ==
=== Batting ===
==== Starters by position ====
Note: Pos = Position; G = Games played; AB = At bats; H = Hits; Avg. = Batting average; HR = Home runs; RBI = Runs batted in

| Pos | Player | G | AB | H | Avg. | HR | RBI |
|---|---|---|---|---|---|---|---|
| C | George Gibson | 102 | 274 | 78 | .285 | 0 | 30 |
| 1B | Ed Konetchy | 154 | 563 | 140 | .249 | 4 | 51 |
| 2B | Jim Viox | 143 | 506 | 134 | .265 | 1 | 57 |
| SS | Honus Wagner | 150 | 552 | 139 | .252 | 1 | 50 |
| 3B | Mike Mowrey | 79 | 284 | 72 | .254 | 1 | 25 |
| OF | Max Carey | 156 | 593 | 144 | .243 | 1 | 31 |
| OF | Joe Kelly | 141 | 508 | 113 | .222 | 1 | 48 |
| OF | Mike Mitchell | 76 | 273 | 64 | .234 | 2 | 23 |

==== Other batters ====
Note: G = Games played; AB = At bats; H = Hits; Avg. = Batting average; HR = Home runs; RBI = Runs batted in

| Player | G | AB | H | Avg. | HR | RBI |
|---|---|---|---|---|---|---|
| Zip Collins | 49 | 182 | 44 | .242 | 0 | 15 |
| Alex McCarthy | 57 | 173 | 26 | .150 | 1 | 14 |
| Bob Coleman | 73 | 150 | 40 | .267 | 1 | 14 |
| Joe Leonard | 53 | 126 | 25 | .198 | 0 | 4 |
| Ed Mensor | 44 | 89 | 18 | .202 | 1 | 6 |
| Ham Hyatt | 74 | 79 | 17 | .215 | 1 | 15 |
| Dan Costello | 21 | 64 | 19 | .297 | 0 | 5 |
| Wally Gerber | 17 | 54 | 13 | .241 | 0 | 5 |
| Jim Kelly | 32 | 44 | 10 | .227 | 0 | 3 |
| Paddy Siglin | 14 | 39 | 6 | .154 | 0 | 2 |
| Bobby Schang | 11 | 35 | 8 | .229 | 0 | 1 |
| Fritz Scheeren | 11 | 31 | 9 | .290 | 1 | 2 |
| Ike McAuley | 15 | 24 | 3 | .125 | 0 | 0 |
| Jake Kafora | 21 | 23 | 3 | .130 | 0 | 0 |
| Clarence Berger | 6 | 13 | 1 | .077 | 0 | 0 |
| Syd Smith | 5 | 11 | 3 | .273 | 0 | 1 |
| Fred Clarke | 2 | 2 | 0 | .000 | 0 | 0 |
| Pat Kilhullen | 1 | 1 | 0 | .000 | 0 | 0 |
| Pete Falsey | 3 | 1 | 0 | .000 | 0 | 0 |
| Bill Wagner | 3 | 1 | 0 | .000 | 0 | 0 |
| Ralph Shafer | 1 | 0 | 0 | ---- | 0 | 0 |
| Sam Brenegan | 1 | 0 | 0 | ---- | 0 | 0 |

=== Pitching ===
==== Starting pitchers ====
Note: G = Games pitched; IP = Innings pitched; W = Wins; L = Losses; ERA = Earned run average; SO = Strikeouts

| Player | G | IP | W | L | ERA | SO |
|---|---|---|---|---|---|---|
| Babe Adams | 40 | 283.0 | 13 | 16 | 2.51 | 91 |
| Wilbur Cooper | 40 | 266.2 | 16 | 15 | 2.13 | 102 |
| George McQuillan | 45 | 259.1 | 13 | 17 | 2.98 | 96 |
| Bob Harmon | 37 | 245.0 | 13 | 17 | 2.53 | 61 |

==== Other pitchers ====
Note: G = Games pitched; IP = Innings pitched; W = Wins; L = Losses; ERA = Earned run average; SO = Strikeouts

| Player | G | IP | W | L | ERA | SO |
|---|---|---|---|---|---|---|
| Joe Conzelman | 33 | 101.0 | 5 | 6 | 2.94 | 39 |
| Marty O'Toole | 19 | 92.1 | 1 | 8 | 4.68 | 36 |
| Erv Kantlehner | 21 | 67.0 | 3 | 2 | 3.09 | 26 |
| Al Mamaux | 13 | 63.0 | 5 | 2 | 1.71 | 30 |
| Herb Kelly | 5 | 25.2 | 0 | 2 | 2.45 | 6 |

==== Relief pitchers ====
Note: G = Games pitched; W = Wins; L = Losses; SV = Saves; ERA = Earned run average; SO = Strikeouts

| Player | G | IP | W | L | ERA | SO |
|---|---|---|---|---|---|---|
| Pat Bohen | 1 | 0 | 0 | 0 | 18.00 | 0 |
| Dixie McArthur | 1 | 0 | 0 | 0 | 0.00 | 1 |
