= 1914 Philadelphia Phillies season =

Major League Baseball season

1914 Philadelphia Phillies
- League: National League
- Ballpark: Baker Bowl
- City: Philadelphia, Pennsylvania
- Owners: William F. Baker
- Managers: Red Dooin

The following lists the events of the 1914 Philadelphia Phillies season.

== Offseason ==
- December 1913: Doc Miller was purchased from the Phillies by the Cincinnati Reds.
- Prior to 1914 season: Vern Duncan jumped from the Phillies to the Baltimore Terrapins.

== Regular season ==
=== Season standings ===
National League
Team	W	L	Pct.	GB	Home	Road
Boston Braves	94	59	.614	—	51‍–‍25	43‍–‍34
New York Giants	84	70	.545	10½	43‍–‍36	41‍–‍34
St. Louis Cardinals	81	72	.529	13	42‍–‍34	39‍–‍38
Chicago Cubs	78	76	.506	16½	46‍–‍30	32‍–‍46
Brooklyn Robins	75	79	.487	19½	45‍–‍34	30‍–‍45
Philadelphia Phillies	74	80	.481	20½	48‍–‍30	26‍–‍50
Pittsburgh Pirates	69	85	.448	25½	39‍–‍36	30‍–‍49
Cincinnati Reds	60	94	.390	34½	34‍–‍42	26‍–‍52

=== Record vs. opponents ===
1914 National League record Sources:
Team	BSN	BRO	CHC	CIN	NYG	PHI	PIT	STL
Boston	—	9–13	16–6	14–8–2	11–11–1	12–10	17–5–1	15–6–1
Brooklyn	13–9	—	10–12	11–11	9–13	11–11	16–6	5–17
Chicago	6–16	12–10	—	17–5	9–13	12–10	12–10	10–12–2
Cincinnati	8–14–2	11–11	5–17	—	9–13	9–13	8–14–1	10–12
New York	11–11–1	13–9	13–9	13–9	—	12–10	13–9–1	9–13
Philadelphia	10–12	11–11	10–12	13–9	10–12	—	12–10	8–14
Pittsburgh	5–17–1	6–16	10–12	14–8–1	9–13–1	10–12	—	15–7–1
St. Louis	6–15–1	17–5	12–10–2	12–10	13–9	14–8	7–15–1	—

=== Roster ===
1914 Philadelphia Phillies
Roster
Pitchers: Pete Alexander; Stan Baumgartner; George Chalmers; Elmer Jacobs; Rube Marshall; Eddie Matteson; Erskine Mayer; Joe Oeschger; Eppa Rixey; Ben Tincup	Catchers: Ed Burns; Red Dooin; Bill Killefer; Pat Moran; Infielders: Bobby Byrne; Hal Irelan; Hans Lobert; Fred Luderus; Jack Martin; Fred Mollenkamp; Herbert Murphy; Milt Reed	Outfielders: Beals Becker; Gavvy Cravath; Josh Devore; Pat Hilly; Sherry Magee; Dode Paskert; Other batters: Frank Fletcher; George McAvoy	Manager: Red Dooin

== Player stats ==
=== Batting ===
==== Starters by position ====
Note: Pos = Position; G = Games played; AB = At bats; H = Hits; Avg. = Batting average; HR = Home runs; RBI = Runs batted in

Pos	Player	G	AB	H	Avg.	HR	RBI
C	Bill Killefer	98	299	70	.234	0	27
1B	Fred Luderus	121	443	110	.248	12	55
2B	Bobby Byrne	126	467	127	.272	0	26
SS	Jack Martin	83	292	74	.253	0	21
3B	Hans Lobert	135	505	139	.275	1	52
OF	Dode Paskert	132	451	119	.264	3	44
OF	Gavvy Cravath	149	499	149	.299	19	100
OF	Beals Becker	138	514	167	.325	9	66

==== Other batters ====
Note: G = Games played; AB = At bats; H = Hits; Avg. = Batting average; HR = Home runs; RBI = Runs batted in

Player	G	AB	H	Avg.	HR	RBI
Sherry Magee	146	544	171	.314	15	103
Hal Irelan	67	165	39	.236	1	16
Ed Burns	70	139	36	.259	0	16
Red Dooin	53	118	21	.178	1	8
Milt Reed	44	107	22	.206	0	2
Josh Devore	30	53	16	.302	0	7
Herbert Murphy	9	26	4	.154	0	3
Pat Hilly	8	10	3	.300	0	1
Fred Mollenkamp	3	8	1	.125	0	0
Frank Fletcher	1	1	0	.000	0	0
George McAvoy	1	1	0	.000	0	0
Pat Moran	1	0	0	----	0	1

=== Pitching ===
==== Starting pitchers ====
Note: G = Games pitched; IP = Innings pitched; W = Wins; L = Losses; ERA = Earned run average; SO = Strikeouts

Player	G	IP	W	L	ERA	SO
Pete Alexander	46	355.0	27	15	2.38	214
Erskine Mayer	48	321.0	21	19	2.58	116
Ben Tincup	28	155.0	8	10	2.61	108
Rube Marshall	27	134.1	6	7	3.45	49

==== Other pitchers ====
Note: G = Games pitched; IP = Innings pitched; W = Wins; L = Losses; ERA = Earned run average; SO = Strikeouts

Player	G	IP	W	L	ERA	SO
Joe Oeschger	32	124.0	4	8	3.77	47
Eppa Rixey	24	103.0	2	11	4.37	41
Stan Baumgartner	15	60.1	2	2	3.28	24
Eddie Matteson	15	58.0	3	2	3.10	28
Elmer Jacobs	14	50.2	1	3	4.80	17
George Chalmers	3	18.0	0	3	5.50	6
