= List of Major League Baseball players (Ka–Ki) =

The following is a list of Major League Baseball players, retired or active.

== Ka through Ki ==
Name	Debut	Final game	Position	Teams	Ref
Kila Ka'aihue	September 4, 2008		First baseman	Kansas City Royals	
Jim Kaat	August 2, 1959	July 1, 1983	Pitcher	Washington Senators/Minnesota Twins, Chicago White Sox, Philadelphia Phillies, New York Yankees, St. Louis Cardinals	
Jack Kading	September 12, 1910	May 2, 1914	First baseman	Pittsburgh Pirates, Chicago Chi-Feds	
Jake Kafora	October 5, 1913	September 7, 1914	Catcher	Pittsburgh Pirates	
Ike Kahdot	September 5, 1922	September 21, 1922	Third baseman	Cleveland Indians	
Nick Kahl	May 2, 1905	August 2, 1905	Second baseman	Cleveland Naps	
Bob Kahle	April 21, 1938	June 22, 1938	Pinch hitter	Boston Bees	
George Kahler	August 13, 1910	May 4, 1914	Pitcher	Cleveland Naps	
Owen Kahn	May 24, 1930	May 24, 1930	Pinch runner	Boston Braves	
Mike Kahoe	September 22, 1895	August 12, 1909	Catcher	Cincinnati Reds, Chicago Orphans, St. Louis Browns, Philadelphia Phillies, Chicago Cubs, Washington Senators	
Don Kainer	September 6, 1980	October 5, 1980	Pitcher	Texas Rangers	
Al Kaiser	April 18, 1911	August 30, 1914	Outfielder	Chicago Cubs, Boston Rustlers, Indianapolis Hoosiers (FL)	
Bob Kaiser	September 3, 1971	September 18, 1971	Pitcher	Cleveland Indians	
Don Kaiser	July 20, 1955	September 24, 1957	Pitcher	Chicago Cubs	
Jeff Kaiser	April 11, 1985	May 17, 1993	Pitcher	Oakland Athletics, Cleveland Indians, Detroit Tigers, Cincinnati Reds, New York Mets	
George Kaiserling	April 20, 1914	October 3, 1915	Pitcher	Indianapolis Hoosiers (FL)/Newark Peppers	
Charlie Kalbfus	April 18, 1884	April 18, 1884	Outfielder	Washington Nationals (UA)	
Bill Kalfass	September 15, 1937	October 2, 1937	Pitcher	Philadelphia Athletics	
Frank Kalin	September 25, 1940	May 6, 1943	Outfielder	Pittsburgh Pirates, Chicago White Sox	
Al Kaline β	June 25, 1953	October 2, 1974	Outfielder	Detroit Tigers	
Ryan Kalish	July 31, 2010		Outfielder	Boston Red Sox	
Rudy Kallio	April 25, 1918	May 12, 1925	Pitcher	Detroit Tigers, Boston Red Sox	
Scott Kamieniecki	June 18, 1991	October 1, 2000	Pitcher	New York Yankees, Baltimore Orioles, Cleveland Indians, Atlanta Braves	
Willie Kamm	April 18, 1923	May 21, 1935	Third baseman	Chicago White Sox, Cleveland Indians	
Bob Kammeyer	July 3, 1978	September 18, 1979	Pitcher	New York Yankees	
Ike Kamp	September 16, 1924	September 21, 1925	Pitcher	Boston Braves	
Alex Kampouris	July 31, 1934	September 23, 1943	Second baseman	Cincinnati Reds, New York Giants, Brooklyn Dodgers, Washington Senators	
Frank Kane	September 13, 1915	April 28, 1919	Outfielder	Brooklyn Tip-Tops, New York Yankees	
Harry Kane	August 8, 1902	May 5, 1906	Pitcher	St. Louis Browns, Detroit Tigers, Philadelphia Phillies	
Jerry Kane	May 2, 1890	June 25, 1890	Utility player	St. Louis Browns	
Jim Kane	April 21, 1908	October 4, 1908	First baseman	Pittsburgh Pirates	
John Kane (OF)	April 11, 1907	October 15, 1910	Outfielder	Cincinnati Reds, Chicago Cubs	
John Kane (IF)	September 3, 1925	September 18, 1925	Utility infielder	Chicago White Sox	
Tom Kane	August 3, 1938	August 13, 1938	Second baseman	Boston Bees	
Rod Kanehl	April 15, 1962	October 4, 1964	Utility player	New York Mets	
Erv Kantlehner	April 17, 1914	October 4, 1916	Pitcher	Pittsburgh Pirates, Philadelphia Phillies	
Gabe Kapler	September 20, 1998		Outfielder	Detroit Tigers, Texas Rangers, Colorado Rockies, Boston Red Sox, Milwaukee Brewers, Tampa Bay Rays	
Heinie Kappel	May 22, 1887	August 1, 1889	Utility infielder	Cincinnati Red Stockings (AA), Columbus Solons	
Joe Kappel	May 26, 1884	September 8, 1890	Utility player	Philadelphia Quakers, Philadelphia Athletics (AA)	
Matt Karchner	July 18, 1995	June 14, 2000	Pitcher	Chicago White Sox, Chicago Cubs	
Paul Kardow	July 1, 1936	July 4, 1936	Pitcher	Cleveland Indians	
Ed Karger	April 15, 1906	September 4, 1911	Pitcher	Pittsburgh Pirates, St. Louis Cardinals, Cincinnati Reds, Boston Red Sox	
Ron Karkovice	August 17, 1986	September 26, 1997	Catcher	Chicago White Sox	
Andy Karl	April 24, 1943	August 20, 1947	Pitcher	Boston Red Sox, Philadelphia Phillies, Boston Braves	
Scott Karl	May 4, 1995	September 28, 2000	Pitcher	Milwaukee Brewers, Colorado Rockies, Anaheim Angels	
Bill Karlon	August 28, 1930	May 12, 1930	Outfielder	New York Yankees	
Bill Karns	August 14, 1901	September 26, 1901	Pitcher	Baltimore Orioles	
Jason Karnuth	April 20, 2001	September 28, 2005	Pitcher	St. Louis Cardinals, Detroit Tigers	
Marty Karow	June 21, 1927	July 4, 1927	Utility infielder	Boston Red Sox	
Ryan Karp	June 23, 1995	September 27, 1997	Pitcher	Philadelphia Phillies	
Herb Karpel	April 19, 1946	April 20, 1946	Pitcher	New York Yankees	
Benn Karr	April 20, 1920	July 3, 1927	Pitcher	Boston Red Sox, Cleveland Indians	
Eric Karros	September 1, 1991	July 21, 2004	First baseman	Los Angeles Dodgers, Chicago Cubs, Oakland Athletics	
Steve Karsay	August 17, 1993	June 17, 2006	Pitcher	Oakland Athletics, Cleveland Indians, Atlanta Braves, New York Yankees, Texas Rangers	
John Karst	October 6, 1915	October 6, 1915	Third baseman	Brooklyn Robins	
Jeff Karstens	August 22, 2006		Pitcher	New York Yankees, Pittsburgh Pirates	
Takashi Kashiwada	May 1, 1997	September 18, 1997	Pitcher	New York Mets	
Eddie Kasko	April 18, 1957	September 10, 1966	Utility infielder	St. Louis Cardinals, Cincinnati Reds, Houston Colt .45s/Astros, Boston Red Sox	
Matt Kata	June 15, 2003		Second baseman	Arizona Diamondbacks, Philadelphia Phillies, Texas Rangers, Pittsburgh Pirates, Houston Astros	
Jack Katoll	September 9, 1898	September 29, 1902	Pitcher	Chicago Cubs, Chicago White Sox, Baltimore Orioles (1901–02)	
Ray Katt	September 16, 1952	July 21, 1959	Catcher	New York Giants, St. Louis Cardinals	
Bob Katz	May 12, 1944	May 31, 1944	Pitcher	Cincinnati Reds	
Benny Kauff	April 20, 1912	July 2, 1920	Outfielder	New York Highlanders, Indianapolis Hoosiers (FL), Brooklyn Tip-Tops, New York Giants	
Dick Kauffman	September 17, 1914	June 12, 1915	First baseman	St. Louis Browns	
Curt Kaufman	September 10, 1982	September 25, 1984	Pitcher	New York Yankees, California Angels	
Tony Kaufmann	September 23, 1921	September 23, 1935	Pitcher	Chicago Cubs, Philadelphia Phillies, St. Louis Cardinals	
Charlie Kavanagh	June 11, 1914	June 28, 1914	Pinch hitter	Chicago White Sox	
Leo Kavanagh	April 22, 1914	May 2, 1914	Shortstop	Chicago Chi-Feds	
Marty Kavanagh	April 18, 1914	August 8, 1918	Second baseman	Detroit Tigers, Cleveland Indians, St. Louis Cardinals	
Kenshin Kawakami	April 11, 2009		Pitcher	Atlanta Braves	
Bill Kay	August 12, 1907	October 5, 1907	Outfielder	Washington Senators	
Justin Kaye	May 9, 2002	May 16, 2002	Pitcher	Seattle Mariners	
Eddie Kazak	September 29, 1948	July 1, 1952	Third baseman	St. Louis Cardinals, Cincinnati Reds	
Ted Kazanski	June 25, 1953	September 28, 1958	Utility infielder	Philadelphia Phillies	
Sean Kazmar	August 13, 2008	September 23, 2008	Shortstop	San Diego Padres	
Scott Kazmir	August 23, 2004		Pitcher	Tampa Bay Devil Rays/Rays, Los Angeles Angels of Anaheim	
Greg Keagle	April 1, 1996	May 26, 1998	Pitcher	Detroit Tigers	
Steve Kealey	September 9, 1968	July 8, 1973	Pitcher	California Angels, Chicago White Sox	
Bob Kearney	September 25, 1979	June 20, 1987	Catcher	San Francisco Giants, Oakland Athletics, Seattle Mariners	
Austin Kearns	April 17, 2002		Outfielder	Cincinnati Reds, Washington Nationals, Cleveland Indians, New York Yankees	
Teddy Kearns	October 1, 1920	April 28, 1925	First baseman	Philadelphia Athletics, Chicago Cubs	
Tom Kearns	August 26, 1880	October 14, 1884	Second baseman	Buffalo Bisons (NL), Detroit Wolverines	
Eddie Kearse	June 13, 1942	July 5, 1942	Catcher	New York Yankees	
Ed Keas	August 25, 1888	October 16, 1888	Pitcher	Cleveland Blues	
Bob Keating	August 27, 1887	August 27, 1887	Pitcher	Baltimore Orioles (AA)	
Chick Keating	September 26, 1913	September 16, 1926	Shortstop	Chicago Cubs, Philadelphia Phillies	
Ray Keating	September 12, 1912	September 9, 1919	Pitcher	New York Highlanders/Yankees, Boston Braves	
Greg Keatley	September 27, 1981	October 5, 1981	Catcher	Kansas City Royals	
Cactus Keck	May 26, 1922	October 7, 1923	Pitcher	Cincinnati Reds	
Pat Keedy	September 10, 1985	May 3, 1989	Third baseman	California Angels, Chicago White Sox, Cleveland Indians	
Bobby Keefe	April 15, 1907	July 26, 1912	Pitcher	New York Highlanders, Cincinnati Reds	
Dave Keefe	April 21, 1917	August 5, 1922	Pitcher	Philadelphia Athletics, Cleveland Indians	
George Keefe	July 30, 1886	April 28, 1891	Pitcher	Washington Nationals (1886–1889), Buffalo Bisons (PL), Washington Statesmen	
John Keefe	April 28, 1890	October 11, 1890	Pitcher	Syracuse Stars (AA)	
Tim Keefe β	August 6, 1880	August 15, 1893	Pitcher	Troy Trojans, New York Metropolitans, New York Giants, New York Giants (PL), Philadelphia Phillies	
Bob Keegan	May 24, 1953	July 24, 1958	Pitcher	Chicago White Sox	
Ed Keegan	August 24, 1959	April 29, 1962	Pitcher	Philadelphia Phillies, Kansas City Athletics	
Willie Keeler β	September 30, 1892	September 5, 1910	Outfielder	New York Giants, Brooklyn Grooms, Baltimore Orioles (NL), Brooklyn Superbas, New York Highlanders	
Burt Keeley	April 18, 1908	May 14, 1909	Pitcher	Washington Senators	
Bob Keely	July 25, 1944	September 29, 1945	Catcher	St. Louis Cardinals	
Bill Keen	August 8, 1911	October 9, 1911	First baseman	Pittsburgh Pirates	
Vic Keen	August 13, 1918	September 13, 1927	Pitcher	Philadelphia Athletics, Chicago Cubs, St. Louis Cardinals	
Jim Keenan	May 17, 1875	October 3, 1891	Catcher	New Haven Elm Citys, Buffalo Bisons (NL), Pittsburgh Alleghenys, Indianapolis Hoosiers (AA), Cincinnati Red Stockings (AA)/Reds	
Jimmie Keenan	September 9, 1920	July 4, 1921	Pitcher	Philadelphia Phillies	
Kid Keenan	August 11, 1891	August 11, 1891	Pitcher	Cincinnati Kelly's Killers	
Harry Keener	June 27, 1896	September 22, 1896	Pitcher	Philadelphia Phillies	
Jeff Keener	June 8, 1982	September 27, 1983	Pitcher	St. Louis Cardinals	
Joe Keener	September 18, 1976	September 28, 1976	Pitcher	Montreal Expos	
George Keerl	May 4, 1875	June 14, 1875	Second baseman	Chicago White Stockings	
Jim Keesey	September 6, 1925	June 25, 1930	First baseman	Philadelphia Athletics	
Rickey Keeton	May 27, 1980	August 25, 1981	Pitcher	Milwaukee Brewers	
Frank Keffer	April 19, 1890	May 3, 1890	Pitcher	Syracuse Stars (AA)	
Chet Kehn	April 30, 1942	May 12, 1942	Pitcher	Brooklyn Dodgers	
Katsy Keifer	October 8, 1914	October 8, 1914	Pitcher	Indianapolis Hoosiers (FL)	
Randy Keisler	September 10, 2000	July 27, 2007	Pitcher	New York Yankees, San Diego Padres, Cincinnati Reds, Oakland Athletics, St. Louis Cardinals	
Bill Keister	May 20, 1896	August 25, 1903	Utility player	Baltimore Orioles (NL), Boston Beaneaters, St. Louis Cardinals, Baltimore Orioles (1901–02), Washington Senators, Philadelphia Phillies	
Mike Kekich	June 9, 1965	October 1, 1977	Pitcher	Los Angeles Dodgers, New York Yankees, Cleveland Indians, Texas Rangers, Seattle Mariners	
George Kelb	April 17, 1898	June 24, 1898	Pitcher	Cleveland Spiders	
Mickey Keliher	September 10, 1911	May 9, 1912	First baseman	Pittsburgh Pirates	
George Kell β	September 28, 1943	September 14, 1957	Third baseman	Philadelphia Athletics, Detroit Tigers, Boston Red Sox, Chicago White Sox, Baltimore Orioles	
Skeeter Kell	April 19, 1952	September 26, 1952	Second baseman	Philadelphia Athletics	
Duke Kelleher	August 18, 1916	August 18, 1916	Catcher	New York Giants	
Frankie Kelleher	July 18, 1942	June 14, 1943	Outfielder	Cincinnati Reds	
Hal Kelleher	September 17, 1935	May 5, 1938	Pitcher	Philadelphia Phillies	
John Kelleher	July 31, 1912	April 20, 1924	Third baseman	St. Louis Cardinals, Brooklyn Robins, Chicago Cubs, Boston Braves	
Mick Kelleher	September 1, 1972	October 3, 1982	Utility infielder	St. Louis Cardinals, Houston Astros, Chicago Cubs, Detroit Tigers, California Angels	
Charlie Keller	April 22, 1939	September 14, 1952	Outfielder	New York Yankees, Detroit Tigers	
Hal Keller	September 13, 1949	July 28, 1952	Catcher	Washington Senators	
Kris Keller	May 24, 2002	May 24, 2002	Pitcher	Detroit Tigers	
Ron Keller	July 9, 1966	September 27, 1968	Pitcher	Minnesota Twins	
Frank Kellert	April 18, 1953	September 29, 1956	First baseman	St. Louis Browns/Baltimore Orioles, Brooklyn Dodgers, Chicago Cubs	
Al Kellett	June 29, 1923	August 30, 1924	Pitcher	Philadelphia Athletics, Boston Red Sox	
Red Kellett	July 2, 1934	September 30, 1934	Shortstop	Boston Red Sox	
Dick Kelley	April 15, 1964	September 28, 1971	Pitcher	Milwaukee/Atlanta Braves, San Diego Padres	
Harry Kelley	April 16, 1925	July 23, 1939	Pitcher	Washington Senators, Philadelphia Athletics	
Joe Kelley β	July 27, 1891	October 3, 1908	Outfielder	Boston Beaneaters, Pittsburgh Pirates, Baltimore Orioles (NL), Brooklyn Superbas, Baltimore Orioles (1901–02), Cincinnati Reds, Boston Doves	
Mike Kelley	July 15, 1899	October 14, 1899	First baseman	Louisville Colonels	
Shawn Kelley	April 10, 2009		Pitcher	Seattle Mariners	
Tom Kelley	May 5, 1964	May 20, 1973	Pitcher	Cleveland Indians, Atlanta Braves	
Frank Kelliher	September 19, 1919	September 19, 1919	Pinch hitter	Washington Senators	
Alex Kellner	April 29, 1948	June 23, 1959	Pitcher	Philadelphia/Kansas City Athletics, Cincinnati Reds, St. Louis Cardinals	
Walt Kellner	September 6, 1952	September 11, 1953	Pitcher	Philadelphia Athletics	
Al Kellogg	September 25, 1908	October 3, 1908	Pitcher	Philadelphia Athletics	
Bill Kellogg	April 14, 1914	October 5, 1914	First baseman	Cincinnati Reds	
Nate Kellogg	August 27, 1885	September 5, 1885	Shortstop	Detroit Wolverines	
Win Kellum	April 26, 1901	June 16, 1905	Pitcher	Boston Red Sox, Cincinnati Reds, St. Louis Cardinals	
Bill Kelly (OF)	May 4, 1871	August 29, 1871	Outfielder	Fort Wayne Kekiongas	
Bill Kelly (1B)	September 6, 1920	May 12, 1928	First baseman	Philadelphia Athletics, Philadelphia Phillies	
Billy Kelly	May 2, 1910	October 5, 1913	Catcher	St. Louis Cardinals, Pittsburgh Pirates	
Bob Kelly	May 4, 1951	June 4, 1958	Pitcher	Chicago Cubs, Cincinnati Reds/Redlegs, Cleveland Indians	
Bryan Kelly	September 2, 1986	May 2, 1987	Pitcher	Detroit Tigers	
Charlie Kelly	June 14, 1883	June 10, 1886	Third baseman	Philadelphia Quakers, Philadelphia Athletics (AA)	
Don Kelly	April 2, 2007		Outfielder	Pittsburgh Pirates, Detroit Tigers	
Ed Kelly	April 14, 1914	April 22, 1914	Pitcher	Boston Red Sox	
George Kelly β	August 18, 1915	July 27, 1932	First baseman	New York Giants, Pittsburgh Pirates, Cincinnati Reds, Brooklyn Dodgers	
Herb Kelly	September 25, 1914	September 6, 1915	Pitcher	Pittsburgh Pirates	
Jim Kelly	April 24, 1914	July 4, 1918	Outfielder	Pittsburgh Pirates, Pittsburgh Rebels, Boston Braves	
Joe Kelly (1910s OF)	April 14, 1914	May 27, 1919	Outfielder	Pittsburgh Pirates, Chicago Cubs, Boston Braves	
Joe Kelly (1920s OF)	April 13, 1926	September 25, 1928	Outfielder	Chicago Cubs	
John Kelly (C)	June 7, 1879	October 19, 1884	Catcher	Cleveland Blues (NL), Baltimore Orioles (AA), Philadelphia Quakers, Cincinnati Outlaw Reds, Washington Nationals (UA)	
John Kelly (OF)	April 11, 1907	June 18, 1907	Outfielder	St. Louis Cardinals	
Kenny Kelly	September 7, 2000	October 1, 2005	Outfielder	Tampa Bay Devil Rays, Cincinnati Reds, Washington Nationals	
Kick Kelly	May 1, 1879	August 7, 1879	Catcher	Syracuse Stars (NL), Troy Trojans	
King Kelly β	May 1, 1878	September 2, 1893	Utility player	Cincinnati Reds (1876–1880), Chicago White Stockings, Boston Beaneaters, Boston Reds (1890–91), Cincinnati Kelly's Killers, New York Giants	
Mike Kelly (P)	September 3, 1926	September 16, 1926	Pitcher	Philadelphia Phillies	
Mike Kelly (OF)	April 5, 1994	April 12, 1999	Outfielder	Atlanta Braves, Cincinnati Reds, Tampa Bay Devil Rays, Colorado Rockies	
Pat Kelly (OF)	September 6, 1967	October 4, 1981	Outfielder	Minnesota Twins, Kansas City Royals, Chicago White Sox, Baltimore Orioles, Cleveland Indians	
Pat Kelly (C)	May 28, 1980	June 3, 1980	Catcher	Toronto Blue Jays	
Pat Kelly (IF)	May 20, 1991	June 5, 1999	Second baseman	New York Yankees, St. Louis Cardinals, Toronto Blue Jays	
Red Kelly	June 18, 1910	August 6, 1910	Outfielder	Chicago White Sox	
Ren Kelly	September 18, 1923	September 18, 1923	Pitcher	Philadelphia Athletics	
Roberto Kelly	July 29, 1987	April 18, 2000	Outfielder	New York Yankees, Cincinnati Reds, Atlanta Braves, Montreal Expos, Los Angeles Dodgers, Minnesota Twins, Seattle Mariners, Texas Rangers	
Speed Kelly	July 13, 1909	October 1, 1909	Third baseman	Washington Senators	
Tom Kelly	May 11, 1975	July 11, 1975	First baseman	Minnesota Twins	
Van Kelly	June 13, 1969	June 12, 1970	Third baseman	San Diego Padres	
Billy Kelsey	October 4, 1907	October 6, 1907	Catcher	Pittsburgh Pirates	
Bill Kelso	July 31, 1964	September 28, 1968	Pitcher	Los Angeles/California Angels, Cincinnati Reds	
Ken Keltner	October 2, 1937	May 25, 1950	Third baseman	Cleveland Indians, Boston Red Sox	
David Kelton	June 8, 2003	June 10, 2004	Outfielder	Chicago Cubs	
John Kelty	April 19, 1890	July 12, 1890	Outfielder	Pittsburgh Pirates	
Bill Kemmer	June 3, 1895	June 18, 1895	Third baseman	Louisville Colonels	
Russ Kemmerer	June 27, 1954	June 23, 1963	Pitcher	Boston Red Sox, Washington Senators, Chicago White Sox, Houston Colt .45s	
Rudy Kemmler	July 26, 1879	August 11, 1889	Catcher	Providence Grays, Cleveland Blues (NL), Cincinnati Red Stockings (AA), Pittsburgh Alleghenys, Columbus Buckeyes, St. Louis Browns (AA), Columbus Solons	
Dutch Kemner	April 19, 1929	June 8, 1929	Pitcher	Cincinnati Reds	
Matt Kemp	May 28, 2006		Outfielder	Los Angeles Dodgers	
Steve Kemp	April 7, 1977	May 24, 1988	Outfielder	Detroit Tigers, Chicago White Sox, New York Yankees, Pittsburgh Pirates, Texas Rangers	
Fred Kendall	September 8, 1969	August 10, 1980	Catcher	San Diego Padres, Cleveland Indians, Boston Red Sox	
Jason Kendall	April 1, 1996	August 30, 2010	Catcher	Pittsburgh Pirates, Oakland Athletics, Chicago Cubs, Milwaukee Brewers, Kansas City Royals	
Al Kenders	August 14, 1961	September 25, 1961	Catcher	Philadelphia Phillies	
Howie Kendrick	April 26, 2006		Second baseman	Los Angeles Angels of Anaheim	
Kyle Kendrick	June 13, 2007		Pitcher	Philadelphia Phillies	
Ed Kenna	May 5, 1902	May 9, 1902	Pitcher	Philadelphia Athletics	
Eddie Kenna	June 2, 1928	September 5, 1928	Catcher	Washington Senators	
Adam Kennedy	August 21, 1999		Second baseman	St. Louis Cardinals, Anaheim Angels/Los Angeles Angels of Anaheim, Oakland Athletics, Washington Nationals, Seattle Mariners	
Bill Kennedy (1942–47 P)	May 1, 1942	September 26, 1947	Pitcher	Washington Senators	
Bill Kennedy (1948–57 P)	April 26, 1948	September 29, 1957	Pitcher	Cleveland Indians, St. Louis Browns, Chicago White Sox, Boston Red Sox, Cincinnati Reds	
Bob Kennedy	September 14, 1939	September 29, 1957	Utility player	Chicago White Sox, Cleveland Indians, Baltimore Orioles, Detroit Tigers, Brooklyn Dodgers	
Brickyard Kennedy	April 26, 1892	September 26, 1903	Pitcher	Brooklyn Grooms/Bridegrooms/Superbas, New York Giants, Pittsburgh Pirates	
Doc Kennedy	May 1, 1879	July 6, 1883	Catcher	Cleveland Blues (NL), Buffalo Bisons (NL)	
Ed Kennedy (OF)	May 1, 1883	August 25, 1886	Outfielder	New York Metropolitans, Brooklyn Grays	
Ed Kennedy (IF)	May 17, 1884	August 1, 1884	Third baseman	Cincinnati Outlaw Reds	
Ian Kennedy	September 1, 2007		Pitcher	New York Yankees, Arizona Diamondbacks	
Jim Kennedy	June 14, 1970	July 9, 1970	Utility infielder	St. Louis Cardinals	
Joe Kennedy	June 6, 2001	September 29, 2007	Pitcher	Tampa Bay Devil Rays, Colorado Rockies, Oakland Athletics, Arizona Diamondbacks, Toronto Blue Jays	
John Kennedy (SS)	April 22, 1957	May 3, 1957	Shortstop	Philadelphia Phillies	
John Kennedy (3B)	September 5, 1962	June 16, 1974	Third baseman	Washington Senators (1961–71), Los Angeles Dodgers, New York Yankees, Seattle Pilots/Milwaukee Brewers, Boston Red Sox	
Junior Kennedy	August 9, 1974	July 17, 1983	Second baseman	Cincinnati Reds, Chicago Cubs	
Monte Kennedy	April 18, 1946	September 12, 1953	Pitcher	New York Giants	
Ray Kennedy	September 8, 1916	September 8, 1916	Pinch hitter	St. Louis Browns	
Snapper Kennedy	May 1, 1902	May 1, 1902	Outfielder	Chicago Cubs	
Ted Kennedy	June 12, 1885	September 23, 1886	Pitcher	Chicago White Stockings, Philadelphia Athletics, Louisville Colonels	
Terry Kennedy	September 4, 1978	October 6, 1991	Catcher	St. Louis Cardinals, San Diego Padres, Baltimore Orioles, San Francisco Giants	
Vern Kennedy	September 18, 1934	September 27, 1945	Pitcher	Chicago White Sox, Detroit Tigers, St. Louis Browns, Washington Senators, Cleveland Indians, Philadelphia Phillies, Cincinnati Reds	
Art Kenney	July 1, 1948	July 4, 1948	Pitcher	Boston Bees	
Jerry Kenney	September 5, 1967	April 19, 1973	Third baseman	New York Yankees, Cleveland Indians	
John Kenney	May 2, 1872	May 20, 1872	Utility infielder	Brooklyn Atlantics	
Logan Kensing	September 10, 2004		Pitcher	Florida Marlins, Washington Nationals	
Ed Kent	August 14, 1884	August 14, 1884	Pitcher	Toledo Blue Stockings	
Jeff Kent	April 12, 1992	September 27, 2008	Second baseman	Toronto Blue Jays, New York Mets, Cleveland Indians, San Francisco Giants, Houston Astros, Los Angeles Dodgers	
Maury Kent	April 15, 1912	July 18, 1913	Pitcher	Brooklyn Dodgers/Superbas	
Steve Kent	April 4, 2002	September 22, 2002	Pitcher	Tampa Bay Devil Rays	
Bill Kenworthy	August 28, 1912	May 8, 1917	Second baseman	Washington Senators, Kansas City Packers, St. Louis Browns	
Dick Kenworthy	September 8, 1962	September 29, 1968	Third baseman	Chicago White Sox	
Joe Keough	August 7, 1968	July 26, 1973	Outfielder	Oakland Athletics, Kansas City Royals, Chicago White Sox	
Marty Keough	April 21, 1956	September 16, 1966	Outfielder	Boston Red Sox, Cleveland Indians, Washington Senators (1961–71), Cincinnati Reds, Atlanta Braves, Chicago Cubs	
Matt Keough	September 3, 1977	October 2, 1986	Pitcher	Oakland Athletics, New York Yankees, St. Louis Cardinals, Chicago Cubs, Houston Astros	
Bobby Keppel	May 25, 2006		Pitcher	Kansas City Royals, Colorado Rockies, Minnesota Twins	
Jeff Keppinger	August 20, 2004		Utility infielder	New York Mets, Kansas City Royals, Cincinnati Reds, Houston Astros, San Francisco Giants	
Kurt Kepshire	July 4, 1984	April 23, 1986	Pitcher	St. Louis Cardinals	
Charlie Kerfeld	July 27, 1985	July 19, 1990	Pitcher	Houston Astros, Atlanta Braves	
Gus Keriazakos	October 1, 1950	September 23, 1955	Pitcher	Chicago White Sox, Washington Senators, Kansas City Athletics	
John Kerins	May 1, 1884	June 15, 1890	First baseman	Indianapolis Hoosiers (AA), Louisville Colonels, Baltimore Orioles (AA), St. Louis Browns (AA)	
Bill Kerksieck	June 21, 1939	September 24, 1939	Pitcher	Philadelphia Phillies	
Orie Kerlin	June 6, 1915	September 1, 1915	Catcher	Pittsburgh Rebels	
Bill Kern	September 19, 1962	September 30, 1962	Outfielder	Kansas City Athletics	
Jim Kern	September 6, 1974	May 30, 1986	Pitcher	Cleveland Indians, Texas Rangers, Cincinnati Reds, Chicago White Sox, Philadelphia Phillies, Milwaukee Brewers	
Joe Kernan	April 14, 1873	April 15, 1873	Utility player	Baltimore Marylands	
George Kernek	September 5, 1965	May 8, 1966	First baseman	St. Louis Cardinals	
Russ Kerns	August 18, 1945	August 18, 1945	Pinch hitter	Detroit Tigers	
Buddy Kerr	September 8, 1943	September 30, 1951	Shortstop	New York Giants, Boston Braves	
Dickey Kerr	April 25, 1919	October 4, 1925	Pitcher	Chicago White Sox	
Doc Kerr	April 22, 1914	August 26, 1915	Catcher	Pittsburgh Rebels, Baltimore Terrapins	
John Kerr	May 1, 1923	September 30, 1934	Second baseman	Detroit Tigers, Chicago White Sox, Washington Senators	
Mel Kerr	September 16, 1925	September 16, 1925	Pinch runner	Chicago Cubs	
Joe Kerrigan	July 9, 1976	April 12, 1980	Pitcher	Montreal Expos, Baltimore Orioles	
Clayton Kershaw	May 25, 2008		Pitcher	Los Angeles Dodgers	
Jason Kershner	July 25, 2002	June 16, 2004	Pitcher	San Diego Padres, Toronto Blue Jays	
Dan Kerwin	September 27, 1903	September 27, 1903	Outfielder	Cincinnati Reds	
Don Kessinger	September 7, 1964	July 31, 1979	Shortstop	Chicago Cubs, St. Louis Cardinals, Chicago White Sox	
Keith Kessinger	September 15, 1993	October 3, 1993	Shortstop	Cincinnati Reds	
Henry Kessler	August 4, 1873	June 16, 1877	Shortstop	Brooklyn Atlantics, Cincinnati Reds (1876–1880)	
Rick Kester	August 18, 1968	September 27, 1970	Pitcher	Atlanta Braves	
Fred Ketcham	September 12, 1899	May 4, 1901	Outfielder	Louisville Colonels, Philadelphia Athletics	
Gus Ketchum	August 7, 1922	September 28, 1922	Pitcher	Philadelphia Athletics	
Phil Ketter	May 23, 1912	May 25, 1912	Catcher	St. Louis Browns	
Henry Keupper	April 19, 1914	October 6, 1914	Pitcher	St. Louis Terriers	
Jimmy Key	April 6, 1984	September 20, 1998	Pitcher	Toronto Blue Jays, New York Yankees, Baltimore Orioles	
Brian Keyser	June 2, 1995	September 29, 1996	Pitcher	Chicago White Sox	
Sam Khalifa	June 25, 1985	July 31, 1987	Shortstop	Pittsburgh Pirates	
Hod Kibbie	June 13, 1925	June 24, 1925	Second baseman	Boston Braves	
Jack Kibble	September 10, 1912	September 27, 1912	Third baseman	Cleveland Naps	
Masao Kida	April 5, 1999	August 3, 2005	Pitcher	Detroit Tigers, Los Angeles Dodgers, Seattle Mariners	
Dana Kiecker	April 12, 1990	October 1, 1991	Pitcher	Boston Red Sox	
Joe Kiefer	October 1, 1920	May 25, 1926	Pitcher	Chicago White Sox, Boston Red Sox	
Mark Kiefer	September 20, 1993	April 27, 1996	Pitcher	Milwaukee Brewers	
Steve Kiefer	September 3, 1984	August 22, 1989	Third baseman	Oakland Athletics, Milwaukee Brewers, New York Yankees	
Bobby Kielty	April 10, 2001	September 30, 2007	Outfielder	Minnesota Twins, Toronto Blue Jays, Oakland Athletics, Boston Red Sox	
John Kiely	July 26, 1991	May 2, 1993	Pitcher	Detroit Tigers	
Leo Kiely	June 27, 1951	June 20, 1960	Pitcher	Boston Red Sox, Kansas City Athletics	
Bill Kienzle	September 15, 1882	August 7, 1884	Outfielder	Philadelphia Athletics (AA), Philadelphia Keystones	
Brooks Kieschnick	April 3, 1996	October 3, 2004	Utility player	Chicago Cubs, Cincinnati Reds, Colorado Rockies, Milwaukee Brewers	
Mark Kiger	October 13, 2006	October 14, 2006	Pinch runner	Oakland Athletics	
Brad Kilby	September 2, 2009		Pitcher	Oakland Athletics	
Pete Kilduff	April 18, 1917	September 28, 1921	Second baseman	New York Giants, Chicago Cubs, Brooklyn Robins	
Darryl Kile	April 8, 1991	June 18, 2002	Pitcher	Houston Astros, Colorado Rockies, St. Louis Cardinals	
John Kiley	May 1, 1884	May 7, 1891	Outfielder	Washington Nationals (AA), Boston Beaneaters	
Paul Kilgus	June 7, 1987	October 3, 1993	Pitcher	Texas Rangers, Chicago Cubs, Toronto Blue Jays, Baltimore Orioles, St. Louis Cardinals	
Pat Kilhullen	June 10, 1914	June 10, 1914	Catcher	Pittsburgh Pirates	
Mike Kilkenny	April 11, 1969	May 6, 1973	Pitcher	Detroit Tigers, Oakland Athletics, San Diego Padres, Cleveland Indians	
Harmon Killebrew β	June 23, 1954	September 26, 1975	Utility player	Washington Senators/Minnesota Twins, Kansas City Royals	
Evans Killeen	September 7, 1959	September 25, 1959	Pitcher	Kansas City Athletics	
Henry Killeen	September 11, 1891	September 11, 1891	Pitcher	Cleveland Spiders	
Bill Killefer	September 13, 1909	October 1, 1921	Catcher	St. Louis Browns, Philadelphia Phillies, Chicago Cubs	
Red Killefer	September 16, 1907	August 19, 1916	Outfielder	Detroit Tigers, Washington Senators, Cincinnati Reds, New York Giants	
Frank Killen	August 27, 1891	June 27, 1900	Pitcher	Milwaukee Brewers (AA), Washington Senators (NL), Pittsburgh Pirates, Boston Beaneaters, Chicago Orphans	
Ed Killian	August 25, 1903	July 15, 1910	Pitcher	Cleveland Naps, Detroit Tigers	
Jack Killilay	May 13, 1911	September 22, 1911	Pitcher	Boston Red Sox	
Matt Kilroy	April 17, 1886	August 17, 1898	Pitcher	Baltimore Orioles (AA), Boston Reds (1890–91), Cincinnati Kelly's Killers, Washington Senators (NL), Louisville Colonels, Chicago Orphans	
Mike Kilroy	September 1, 1888	May 1, 1891	Pitcher	Baltimore Orioles (AA), Philadelphia Phillies	
Byung-hyun Kim	May 29, 1999	September 28, 2007	Pitcher	Arizona Diamondbacks, Boston Red Sox, Colorado Rockies, Florida Marlins	
Sun-Woo Kim	June 15, 2001	September 17, 2006	Pitcher	Boston Red Sox, Montreal Expos/Washington Nationals, Colorado Rockies, Cincinnati Reds	
Cole Kimball	May 14, 2011		Pitcher	Washington Nationals	
Gene Kimball	May 4, 1871	September 27, 1871	Second baseman	Cleveland Forest Citys	
Newt Kimball	May 7, 1937	September 23, 1943	Pitcher	Chicago Cubs, Brooklyn Dodgers, St. Louis Cardinals, Philadelphia Phillies	
Sam Kimber	May 1, 1884	September 29, 1885	Pitcher	Brooklyn Atlantics (AA), Providence Grays	
Harry Kimberlin	July 11, 1936	June 24, 1939	Pitcher	St. Louis Browns	
Dick Kimble	August 20, 1945	September 18, 1945	Shortstop	Washington Senators	
Craig Kimbrel	May 7, 2010		Pitcher	Atlanta Braves	
Hal Kime	June 19, 1920	July 27, 1920	Pitcher	St. Louis Cardinals	
Bruce Kimm	May 4, 1976	September 19, 1980	Catcher	Detroit Tigers, Chicago Cubs, Chicago White Sox	
Wally Kimmick	September 13, 1919	June 12, 1926	Utility infielder	St. Louis Cardinals, Cincinnati Reds, Philadelphia Phillies	
Chad Kimsey	April 21, 1929	July 29, 1936	Pitcher	St. Louis Browns, Chicago White Sox, Detroit Tigers	
Jerry Kindall	July 1, 1956	October 2, 1965	Second baseman	Chicago Cubs, Cleveland Indians, Minnesota Twins	
Ellis Kinder	April 30, 1946	May 8, 1957	Pitcher	St. Louis Browns, Boston Red Sox, St. Louis Cardinals, Chicago White Sox	
Ralph Kiner β	April 16, 1946	September 25, 1955	Outfielder	Pittsburgh Pirates, Chicago Cubs, Cleveland Indians	
Chick King	August 27, 1954	May 30, 1959	Outfielder	Detroit Tigers, Chicago Cubs, St. Louis Cardinals	
Clyde King	June 21, 1944	September 27, 1953	Pitcher	Brooklyn Dodgers, Cincinnati Reds	
Curtis King	August 1, 1997	June 20, 1999	Pitcher	St. Louis Cardinals	
Eric King	May 15, 1986	October 4, 1992	Pitcher	Detroit Tigers, Chicago White Sox, Cleveland Indians	
Hal King	September 6, 1967	October 1, 1974	Catcher	Houston Astros, Atlanta Braves, Texas Rangers, Cincinnati Reds	
Jeff King	June 2, 1989	May 21, 1999	Utility infielder	Pittsburgh Pirates, Kansas City Royals	
Jim King	April 17, 1955	September 24, 1967	Outfielder	Chicago Cubs, St. Louis Cardinals, San Francisco Giants, Washington Senators (1961–71), Chicago White Sox, Cleveland Indians	
Kevin King	September 2, 1993	May 14, 1995	Pitcher	Seattle Mariners	
Lee King (OF born 1892)	June 24, 1916	April 28, 1919	Outfielder	Philadelphia Athletics, Boston Braves	
Lee King (OF born 1894)	September 20, 1916	October 1, 1922	Outfielder	Pittsburgh Pirates, New York Giants, Philadelphia Phillies	
Lynn King	September 21, 1935	September 30, 1939	Outfielder	St. Louis Cardinals	
Marshall King	May 7, 1871	June 17, 1872	Utility player	Chicago White Stockings, Troy Haymakers	
Nellie King	April 15, 1954	September 15, 1957	Pitcher	Pittsburgh Pirates	
Ray King	May 21, 1999	April 23, 2008	Pitcher	Chicago Cubs, Milwaukee Brewers, Atlanta Braves, St. Louis Cardinals, Colorado Rockies, Washington Nationals	
Sam King	May 1, 1884	May 23, 1884	First baseman	Washington Nationals (AA)	
Silver King	September 28, 1884	August 19, 1897	Pitcher	Kansas City Cowboys (NL), St. Louis Browns (AA), Chicago Pirates, Pittsburgh Pirates, New York Giants, Cincinnati Reds, Washington Senators (NL)	
Steve King	May 9, 1871	July 23, 1872	Outfielder	Troy Haymakers	
Wes Kingdon	June 12, 1932	August 4, 1932	Third baseman	Washington Senators	
Mike Kingery	July 7, 1986	September 15, 1996	Outfielder	Kansas City Royals, Seattle Royals, San Francisco Giants, Oakland Athletics, Colorado Rockies, Pittsburgh Pirates	
Brian Kingman	June 28, 1979	June 10, 1983	Pitcher	Oakland Athletics, San Francisco Giants	
Dave Kingman	July 30, 1971	October 5, 1986	Utility player	San Francisco Giants, New York Mets, San Diego Padres, California Angels, New York Yankees, Chicago Cubs, Oakland Athletics	
Harry Kingman	July 1, 1914	August 20, 1914	First baseman	New York Yankees	
Gene Kingsale	September 3, 1996	June 8, 2003	Outfielder	Baltimore Orioles, Seattle Mariners, San Diego Padres, Detroit Tigers	
Mike Kinkade	September 8, 1998	September 28, 2003	Outfielder	New York Mets, Baltimore Orioles, Los Angeles Dodgers	
Billy Kinloch	August 1, 1895	August 1, 1895	Third baseman	St. Louis Browns (NL)	
Dennis Kinney	April 9, 1978	May 20, 1982	Pitcher	Cleveland Indians, San Diego Padres, Detroit Tigers, Oakland Athletics	
Josh Kinney	July 3, 2006		Pitcher	St. Louis Cardinals, Chicago White Sox	
Matt Kinney	August 18, 2000	September 28, 2005	Pitcher	Minnesota Twins, Milwaukee Brewers, Kansas City Royals, San Francisco Giants	
Walt Kinney	July 26, 1918	May 9, 1923	Pitcher	Boston Red Sox, Philadelphia Athletics	
Mike Kinnunen	June 12, 1980	October 3, 1987	Pitcher	Minnesota Twins, Baltimore Orioles	
Bob Kinsella	September 20, 1919	October 2, 1920	Outfielder	New York Giants	
Ed Kinsella	September 16, 1905	August 10, 1910	Pitcher	Pittsburgh Pirates, St. Louis Browns	
Ian Kinsler	April 3, 2006		Second baseman	Texas Rangers	
William Kinsler	June 8, 1893	June 8, 1893	Outfielder	New York Giants	
Tom Kinslow	June 4, 1886	September 3, 1898	Catcher	Washington Nationals (1886–1889), New York Metropolitans, Brooklyn Ward's Wonders, Brooklyn Grooms, Pittsburgh Pirates, Louisville Colonels, Washington Senators (NL), St. Louis Browns (NL)	
Brandon Kintzler	September 10, 2010		Pitcher	Milwaukee Brewers	
Matt Kinzer	May 18, 1989	May 26, 1990	Pitcher	St. Louis Cardinals, Detroit Tigers	
Walt Kinzie	July 17, 1882	September 9, 1884	Shortstop	Detroit Wolverines, Chicago White Stockings, St. Louis Browns (AA)	
Harry Kinzy	June 8, 1934	September 26, 1934	Pitcher	Chicago White Sox	
Jason Kipnis	July 22, 2011		Second baseman	Cleveland Indians	
Fred Kipp	September 10, 1957	May 8, 1960	Pitcher	Brooklyn/Los Angeles Dodgers, New York Yankees	
Bob Kipper	April 12, 1985	July 27, 1992	Pitcher	California Angels, Pittsburgh Pirates, Minnesota Twins	
Thornton Kipper	June 7, 1953	July 17, 1955	Pitcher	Philadelphia Phillies	
Ed Kippert	April 14, 1914	April 19, 1914	Outfielder	Cincinnati Reds	
Clay Kirby	April 11, 1969	September 28, 1976	Pitcher	San Diego Padres, Cincinnati Reds, Montreal Expos	
Jim Kirby	May 1, 1949	May 13, 1949	Pinch hitter	Chicago Cubs	
John Kirby	August 1, 1884	June 29, 1888	Pitcher	Kansas City Cowboys (UA), St. Louis Maroons/Indianapolis Hoosiers (NL), Cleveland Blues (AA), Kansas City Cowboys (AA)	
LaRue Kirby	August 7, 1912	September 14, 1915	Outfielder	New York Giants, St. Louis Terriers	
Wayne Kirby	September 12, 1991	July 17, 1998	Outfielder	Cleveland Indians, Los Angeles Dodgers, New York Mets	
Mike Kircher	August 8, 1919	April 18, 1921	Pitcher	Philadelphia Athletics, St. Louis Cardinals	
Bill Kirk	September 23, 1961	September 23, 1961	Pitcher	Kansas City Royals	
Tom Kirk	June 24, 1947	June 24, 1947	Pinch hitter	Philadelphia Athletics	
Jay Kirke	September 28, 1910	September 2, 1918	Utility player	Detroit Tigers, Boston Rustlers/Braves, Cleveland Naps/Indians, New York Giants	
Willie Kirkland	April 15, 1958	September 26, 1966	Outfielder	San Francisco Giants, Cleveland Indians, Baltimore Orioles, Washington Senators (1961–71)	
Michael Kirkman	August 21, 2010		Pitcher	Texas Rangers	
Ed Kirkpatrick	September 13, 1962	October 2, 1977	Utility player	Los Angeles/California Angels, Kansas City Royals, Pittsburgh Pirates, Texas Rangers, Milwaukee Brewers	
Enos Kirkpatrick	August 24, 1912	September 16, 1915	Third baseman	Brooklyn Dodgers/Superbas, Baltimore Terrapins	
Don Kirkwood	September 13, 1974	October 1, 1978	Pitcher	California Angels, Chicago White Sox, Toronto Blue Jays	
Joe Kirrene	October 1, 1950	September 25, 1954	Third baseman	Chicago White Sox	
Harry Kirsch	April 16, 1910	April 28, 1910	Pitcher	Cleveland Naps	
Garland Kiser	September 9, 1991	October 6, 1991	Pitcher	Cleveland Indians	
Ernie Kish	July 29, 1945	September 23, 1945	Outfielder	Philadelphia Athletics	
Rube Kisinger	September 10, 1902	September 24, 1903	Pitcher	Detroit Tigers	
Bruce Kison	July 4, 1971	October 5, 1985	Pitcher	Pittsburgh Pirates, California Angels, Boston Red Sox	
Bill Kissinger	May 30, 1895	June 10, 1987	Pitcher	Baltimore Orioles (NL), St. Louis Browns (NL)	
Frank Kitson	May 19, 1898	July 22, 1907	Pitcher	Baltimore Orioles (NL), Brooklyn Superbas, Detroit Tigers, Washington Senators, New York Highlanders	
Chris Kitsos	April 21, 1954	April 21, 1954	Shortstop	Chicago Cubs	
Ron Kittle	September 2, 1982	August 13, 1991	Outfielder	Chicago White Sox, New York Yankees, Cleveland Indians, Baltimore Orioles	
Malachi Kittridge	April 19, 1890	August 8, 1906	Catcher	Chicago Colts, Louisville Colonels, Washington Senators (NL), Boston Beaneaters, Washington Senators, Cleveland naps	
