= 1914 Chicago Cubs season =

1914 Chicago Cubs
- League: National League
- Ballpark: West Side Park
- City: Chicago
- Record: 78–76 (.506)
- League place: 4th
- Owners: Charles Murphy, Charles Phelps Taft
- Managers: Hank O'Day

The 1914 Chicago Cubs season was the 43rd season of the Chicago Cubs franchise, the 39th in the National League and the 22nd at West Side Park. The Cubs finished fourth in the National League with a record of 78–76.

== Regular season ==
=== Season standings ===
National League
Team	W	L	Pct.	GB	Home	Road
Boston Braves	94	59	.614	—	51‍–‍25	43‍–‍34
New York Giants	84	70	.545	10½	43‍–‍36	41‍–‍34
St. Louis Cardinals	81	72	.529	13	42‍–‍34	39‍–‍38
Chicago Cubs	78	76	.506	16½	46‍–‍30	32‍–‍46
Brooklyn Robins	75	79	.487	19½	45‍–‍34	30‍–‍45
Philadelphia Phillies	74	80	.481	20½	48‍–‍30	26‍–‍50
Pittsburgh Pirates	69	85	.448	25½	39‍–‍36	30‍–‍49
Cincinnati Reds	60	94	.390	34½	34‍–‍42	26‍–‍52

=== Record vs. opponents ===
1914 National League record Sources:
Team	BSN	BRO	CHC	CIN	NYG	PHI	PIT	STL
Boston	—	9–13	16–6	14–8–2	11–11–1	12–10	17–5–1	15–6–1
Brooklyn	13–9	—	10–12	11–11	9–13	11–11	16–6	5–17
Chicago	6–16	12–10	—	17–5	9–13	12–10	12–10	10–12–2
Cincinnati	8–14–2	11–11	5–17	—	9–13	9–13	8–14–1	10–12
New York	11–11–1	13–9	13–9	13–9	—	12–10	13–9–1	9–13
Philadelphia	10–12	11–11	10–12	13–9	10–12	—	12–10	8–14
Pittsburgh	5–17–1	6–16	10–12	14–8–1	9–13–1	10–12	—	15–7–1
St. Louis	6–15–1	17–5	12–10–2	12–10	13–9	14–8	7–15–1	—

== Roster ==
1914 Chicago Cubs
Roster
Pitchers: Larry Cheney; Casey Hageman; Bert Humphries; Elmer Koestner; Jimmy Lavender; George McConnell; George Pierce; Charlie Smith; Eddie Stack; Hippo Vaughn; Zip Zabel	Catchers: Jimmy Archer; Roger Bresnahan; Bubbles Hargrave; Tom Needham; Earl Tyree; Infielders: Herman Bronkie; Art Bues; Red Corriden; Claud Derrick; Bob Fisher; Chick Keating; Fritz Mollwitz; Art Phelan; Vic Saier; Bill Sweeney; Heinie Zimmerman	Outfielders: Johnny Bates; Wilbur Good; Jimmy Johnston; Pete Knisely; Tommy Leach; Wildfire Schulte; Cy Williams; Other batters: Milo Allison; Tuffy Stewart	Manager: Hank O'Day

== Player stats ==
=== Batting ===
==== Starters by position ====
Note: Pos = Position; G = Games played; AB = At bats; H = Hits; Avg. = Batting average; HR = Home runs; RBI = Runs batted in

Pos	Player	G	AB	H	Avg.	HR	RBI
C	Roger Bresnahan	101	248	69	.278	0	24
1B	Vic Saier	153	537	129	.240	18	72
2B	Bill Sweeney	134	463	101	.218	1	38
SS	Red Corriden	107	318	73	.230	3	29
3B	Heinie Zimmerman	146	564	167	.296	4	87
OF	Tommy Leach	153	577	152	.263	7	46
OF	Wilbur Good	154	580	158	.272	2	43
OF	Frank Schulte	137	465	112	.241	5	61

==== Other batters ====
Note: G = Games played; AB = At bats; H = Hits; Avg. = Batting average; HR = Home runs; RBI = Runs batted in

Player	G	AB	H	Avg.	HR	RBI
Jimmy Archer	79	248	64	.258	0	19
Jimmy Johnston	50	101	23	.228	1	8
Claud Derrick	28	96	21	.219	0	13
Cy Williams	55	94	19	.202	0	5
Pete Knisely	37	69	9	.130	0	5
Bob Fisher	15	50	15	.300	0	5
Art Phelan	25	46	13	.283	0	3
Art Bues	14	45	10	.222	0	4
Bubbles Hargrave	23	36	8	.222	0	2
Chick Keating	20	30	3	.100	0	0
Fritz Mollwitz	13	20	3	.150	0	1
Tom Needham	9	17	2	.118	0	3
Johnny Bates	9	8	1	.125	0	1
Earl Tyree	1	4	0	.000	0	0
Milo Allison	1	1	1	1.000	0	0
Herman Bronkie	1	1	1	1.000	0	1
Tuffy Stewart	2	1	0	.000	0	0

=== Pitching ===
==== Starting pitchers ====
Note: G = Games pitched; IP = Innings pitched; W = Wins; L = Losses; ERA = Earned run average; SO = Strikeouts

Player	G	IP	W	L	ERA	SO
Larry Cheney	50	311.1	20	18	2.54	157
Hippo Vaughn	42	293.2	21	13	2.05	165
Jimmy Lavender	37	214.1	11	11	3.07	87
George McConnell	1	7.0	0	1	1.29	3

==== Other pitchers ====
Note: G = Games pitched; IP = Innings pitched; W = Wins; L = Losses; ERA = Earned run average; SO = Strikeouts

Player	G	IP	W	L	ERA	SO
Bert Humphries	34	171.0	10	11	2.68	62
George Pierce	30	141.0	9	12	3.51	78
Zip Zabel	29	128.0	4	4	2.18	50
Charlie Smith	16	53.2	2	4	3.86	17
Eddie Stack	7	16.1	0	1	4.96	9

==== Relief pitchers ====
Note: G = Games pitched; W = Wins; L = Losses; SV = Saves; ERA = Earned run average; SO = Strikeouts

Player	G	W	L	SV	ERA	SO
Casey Hageman	16	1	1	1	3.47	17
Elmer Koestner	4	0	0	0	2.84	6
