= 1914 St. Louis Cardinals season =

Major League Baseball season

1914 St. Louis Cardinals
- League: National League
- Ballpark: Robison Field
- City: St. Louis, Missouri
- Record: 81–72 (.529)
- League place: 3rd
- Owners: Helene Hathaway Britton
- Managers: Miller Huggins

The 1914 St. Louis Cardinals season was the team's 33rd season in St. Louis, Missouri and its 23rd season in the National League. The Cardinals went 81–72 during the season and finished third in the National League.

== Regular season ==
=== Season standings ===
National League
Team	W	L	Pct.	GB	Home	Road
Boston Braves	94	59	.614	—	51‍–‍25	43‍–‍34
New York Giants	84	70	.545	10½	43‍–‍36	41‍–‍34
St. Louis Cardinals	81	72	.529	13	42‍–‍34	39‍–‍38
Chicago Cubs	78	76	.506	16½	46‍–‍30	32‍–‍46
Brooklyn Robins	75	79	.487	19½	45‍–‍34	30‍–‍45
Philadelphia Phillies	74	80	.481	20½	48‍–‍30	26‍–‍50
Pittsburgh Pirates	69	85	.448	25½	39‍–‍36	30‍–‍49
Cincinnati Reds	60	94	.390	34½	34‍–‍42	26‍–‍52

=== Record vs. opponents ===
1914 National League record Sources:
Team	BSN	BRO	CHC	CIN	NYG	PHI	PIT	STL
Boston	—	9–13	16–6	14–8–2	11–11–1	12–10	17–5–1	15–6–1
Brooklyn	13–9	—	10–12	11–11	9–13	11–11	16–6	5–17
Chicago	6–16	12–10	—	17–5	9–13	12–10	12–10	10–12–2
Cincinnati	8–14–2	11–11	5–17	—	9–13	9–13	8–14–1	10–12
New York	11–11–1	13–9	13–9	13–9	—	12–10	13–9–1	9–13
Philadelphia	10–12	11–11	10–12	13–9	10–12	—	12–10	8–14
Pittsburgh	5–17–1	6–16	10–12	14–8–1	9–13–1	10–12	—	15–7–1
St. Louis	6–15–1	17–5	12–10–2	12–10	13–9	14–8	7–15–1	—

=== Roster ===
1914 St. Louis Cardinals
Roster
Pitchers: Bill Doak; Dan Griner; Casey Hageman; Bill Hopper; Dick Niehaus; Hub Perdue; Pol Perritt; Hank Robinson; Slim Sallee; Bill Steele; Steamboat Williams	Catchers: Paddy O'Connor; Jack Roche; Frank Snyder; Ivey Wingo; Infielders: Zinn Beck; Bruno Betzel; Art Butler; Rolla Daringer; Lee Dressen; Miller Huggins; Dots Miller; Ken Nash; Possum Whitted	Outfielders: Ted Cather; Walton Cruise; Cozy Dolan; Lee Magee; Chuck Miller; Joe Riggert; Chief Wilson	Manager: Miller Huggins; Coaches: Charley O'Leary

== Player stats ==
=== Batting ===
==== Starters by position ====
Note: Pos = Position; G = Games played; AB = At bats; H = Hits; Avg. = Batting average; HR = Home runs; RBI = Runs batted in

Pos	Player	G	AB	H	Avg.	HR	RBI
C	Frank Snyder	100	326	75	.230	1	25
1B	Dots Miller	155	573	166	.290	4	88
2B	Miller Huggins	148	504	134	.263	1	24
SS	Art Butler	86	274	55	.201	1	24
3B	Zinn Beck	137	457	106	.232	3	45
OF	Lee Magee	142	529	150	.284	2	40
OF	Cozy Dolan	126	421	101	.240	4	32
OF	Chief Wilson	154	580	150	.259	9	73

==== Other batters ====
Note: G = Games played; AB = At bats; H = Hits; Avg. = Batting average; HR = Home runs; RBI = Runs batted in

Player	G	AB	H	Avg.	HR	RBI
Walton Cruise	95	256	58	.227	4	28
Ivey Wingo	80	237	71	.300	4	26
Lee Dressen	46	103	24	.233	0	7
Ted Cather	39	99	27	.273	0	13
Joe Riggert	34	89	19	.213	0	8
Ken Nash	24	51	14	.275	0	6
Chuck Miller	36	36	7	.194	0	2
Possum Whitted	20	31	4	.129	0	1
Paddy O'Connor	10	9	0	.000	0	0
Bruno Betzel	7	9	0	.000	0	0
Jack Roche	12	9	6	.667	0	3
Rolla Daringer	2	4	2	.500	0	0

=== Pitching ===
==== Starting pitchers ====
Note: G = Games pitched; IP = Innings pitched; W = Wins; L = Losses; ERA = Earned run average; SO = Strikeouts

Player	G	IP	W	L	ERA	SO
Pol Perritt	41	286.0	16	13	2.36	115
Slim Sallee	46	282.1	18	17	2.10	105
Bill Doak	36	256.0	19	6	1.72	118
Hub Perdue	22	153.1	8	8	2.82	43

==== Other pitchers ====
Note: G = Games pitched; IP = Innings pitched; W = Wins; L = Losses; ERA = Earned run average; SO = Strikeouts

Player	G	IP	W	L	ERA	SO
Dan Griner	37	179.0	9	13	2.51	74
Hank Robinson	26	126.0	7	8	3.00	30
Casey Hageman	12	55.1	2	4	2.44	21
Steamboat Williams	5	11.0	0	1	6.55	2

==== Relief pitchers ====
Note: G = Games pitched; W = Wins; L = Losses; SV = Saves; ERA = Earned run average; SO = Strikeouts

Player	G	W	L	SV	ERA	SO
Bill Steele	17	1	2	0	2.70	16
Dick Niehaus	8	1	0	0	3.12	6
Bill Hopper	3	0	0	0	3.60	1
