= 1914 Brooklyn Robins season =

1914 Brooklyn Robins
- League: National League
- Ballpark: Ebbets Field
- City: Brooklyn, New York
- Record: 75–79 (.487)
- League place: 5th
- Owners: Charles Ebbets, Ed McKeever, Stephen McKeever
- President: Charles Ebbets
- Managers: Wilbert Robinson

With Wilbert Robinson taking over as the new manager, many in the press began using the nickname Brooklyn Robins for the 1914 season along with other names. The Robins finished in 5th place, just missing finishing with a .500 record.

== Offseason ==
- December 20, 1913: Dick Egan was purchased by the Robins from the Cincinnati Reds.

== Regular season ==
=== Season standings ===
National League
| Team | W | L | Pct. | GB | Home | Road |
|---|---|---|---|---|---|---|
| Boston Braves | 94 | 59 | .614 | — | 51‍–‍25 | 43‍–‍34 |
| New York Giants | 84 | 70 | .545 | 10½ | 43‍–‍36 | 41‍–‍34 |
| St. Louis Cardinals | 81 | 72 | .529 | 13 | 42‍–‍34 | 39‍–‍38 |
| Chicago Cubs | 78 | 76 | .506 | 16½ | 46‍–‍30 | 32‍–‍46 |
| Brooklyn Robins | 75 | 79 | .487 | 19½ | 45‍–‍34 | 30‍–‍45 |
| Philadelphia Phillies | 74 | 80 | .481 | 20½ | 48‍–‍30 | 26‍–‍50 |
| Pittsburgh Pirates | 69 | 85 | .448 | 25½ | 39‍–‍36 | 30‍–‍49 |
| Cincinnati Reds | 60 | 94 | .390 | 34½ | 34‍–‍42 | 26‍–‍52 |

=== Record vs. opponents ===
1914 National League record Sources:
| Team | BSN | BRO | CHC | CIN | NYG | PHI | PIT | STL |
|---|---|---|---|---|---|---|---|---|
| Boston | — | 9–13 | 16–6 | 14–8–2 | 11–11–1 | 12–10 | 17–5–1 | 15–6–1 |
| Brooklyn | 13–9 | — | 10–12 | 11–11 | 9–13 | 11–11 | 16–6 | 5–17 |
| Chicago | 6–16 | 12–10 | — | 17–5 | 9–13 | 12–10 | 12–10 | 10–12–2 |
| Cincinnati | 8–14–2 | 11–11 | 5–17 | — | 9–13 | 9–13 | 8–14–1 | 10–12 |
| New York | 11–11–1 | 13–9 | 13–9 | 13–9 | — | 12–10 | 13–9–1 | 9–13 |
| Philadelphia | 10–12 | 11–11 | 10–12 | 13–9 | 10–12 | — | 12–10 | 8–14 |
| Pittsburgh | 5–17–1 | 6–16 | 10–12 | 14–8–1 | 9–13–1 | 10–12 | — | 15–7–1 |
| St. Louis | 6–15–1 | 17–5 | 12–10–2 | 12–10 | 13–9 | 14–8 | 7–15–1 | — |

=== Notable transactions ===
- June 27, 1914: Joe Riggert was purchased from the Robins by the St. Louis Cardinals.
- July 6, 1914: Casey Hageman was purchased from the Robins by the Chicago Cubs.
- August 7, 1914: Bill Steele was purchased by the Robins from the St. Louis Cardinals.
- August 10, 1914: Red Smith was purchased from the Robins by the Boston Braves.

=== Roster ===
1914 Brooklyn Robins
Roster
| Pitchers: Raleigh Aitchison; Frank Allen; Elmer Brown; Johnny Enzmann; Jeff Pfeffer; Pat Ragan; Ed Reulbach; Nap Rucker; Charlie Schmutz; Bill Steele; Bull Wagner | Catchers: Tex Erwin; William Fischer; Lew McCarty; Otto Miller; Infielders: George Cutshaw; Jake Daubert; Dick Egan; Kid Elberfeld; Gus Getz; John Hummel; Ollie O'Mara; Red Smith | Outfielders: Jack Dalton; Hy Myers; Joe Riggert; Casey Stengel; Zack Wheat | Manager: Wilbert Robinson |

== Player stats ==
=== Batting ===
==== Starters by position ====
Note: Pos = Position; G = Games played; AB = At bats; H = Hits; Avg. = Batting average; HR = Home runs; RBI = Runs batted in

| Pos | Player | G | AB | H | Avg. | HR | RBI |
|---|---|---|---|---|---|---|---|
| C | Lew McCarty | 90 | 284 | 72 | .254 | 1 | 30 |
| 1B | Jake Daubert | 126 | 474 | 156 | .329 | 6 | 45 |
| 2B | George Cutshaw | 153 | 583 | 150 | .257 | 2 | 78 |
| 3B | Red Smith | 90 | 330 | 81 | .245 | 4 | 48 |
| SS | Dick Egan | 106 | 337 | 76 | .226 | 1 | 21 |
| OF | Casey Stengel | 126 | 412 | 130 | .316 | 4 | 60 |
| OF | Zack Wheat | 145 | 533 | 170 | .319 | 9 | 89 |
| OF | Jack Dalton | 128 | 442 | 141 | .319 | 1 | 45 |

==== Other batters ====
Note: G = Games played; AB = At bats; H = Hits; Avg. = Batting average; HR = Home runs; RBI = Runs batted in

| Player | G | AB | H | Avg. | HR | RBI |
|---|---|---|---|---|---|---|
| Ollie O'Mara | 67 | 247 | 65 | .263 | 1 | 7 |
| Hy Myers | 70 | 227 | 65 | .286 | 0 | 17 |
| Gus Getz | 55 | 210 | 52 | .248 | 0 | 20 |
| John Hummel | 73 | 208 | 55 | .264 | 0 | 20 |
| Otto Miller | 54 | 169 | 39 | .231 | 0 | 9 |
| William Fischer | 43 | 105 | 27 | .257 | 0 | 8 |
| Joe Riggert | 27 | 83 | 16 | .193 | 2 | 6 |
| Kid Elberfeld | 30 | 62 | 14 | .226 | 0 | 1 |
| Tex Erwin | 9 | 11 | 5 | .455 | 0 | 1 |

=== Pitching ===
==== Starting pitchers ====
Note: G = Games pitched; IP = Innings pitched; W = Wins; L = Losses; ERA = Earned run average; SO = Strikeouts

| Player | G | IP | W | L | ERA | SO |
|---|---|---|---|---|---|---|
| Jeff Pfeffer | 43 | 315.0 | 23 | 12 | 1.97 | 135 |
| Ed Reulbach | 44 | 256.0 | 11 | 18 | 2.64 | 119 |
| Pat Ragan | 38 | 208.1 | 10 | 15 | 2.98 | 106 |
| Nap Rucker | 16 | 103.2 | 7 | 6 | 3.39 | 35 |

==== Other pitchers ====
Note: G = Games pitched; IP = Innings pitched; W = Wins; L = Losses; ERA = Earned run average; SO = Strikeouts

| Player | G | IP | W | L | ERA | SO |
|---|---|---|---|---|---|---|
| Raleigh Aitchison | 26 | 172.1 | 12 | 7 | 2.66 | 87 |
| Frank Allen | 36 | 171.1 | 8 | 14 | 3.10 | 68 |
| Charlie Schmutz | 18 | 57.1 | 1 | 3 | 3.30 | 21 |
| Elmer Brown | 11 | 36.2 | 1 | 2 | 3.93 | 22 |
| Johnny Enzmann | 7 | 19.0 | 1 | 0 | 4.74 | 5 |
| Bill Steele | 8 | 16.1 | 1 | 1 | 5.51 | 3 |

==== Relief pitchers ====
Note: G = Games pitched; W = Wins; L = Losses; SV = Saves; ERA = Earned run average; SO = Strikeouts

| Player | G | W | L | SV | ERA | SO |
|---|---|---|---|---|---|---|
| Bull Wagner | 6 | 0 | 1 | 0 | 6.57 | 4 |
