= 1914 New York Giants season =

1914 New York Giants
- League: National League
- Ballpark: Polo Grounds
- City: New York City
- Record: 84–70 (.545)
- League place: 2nd
- Owners: Harry Hempstead
- Managers: John McGraw

The 1914 New York Giants season was the franchise's 32nd season. The team finished in second place in the National League with an 84–70 record, 10½ games behind the "Miracle Braves". They had finished first the three previous years.

This team featured two Hall of Fame pitchers: Christy Mathewson, one of the greatest ever, and Rube Marquard, whose selection is considered by some to be controversial.

== Regular season ==
The offense scored the most runs in the league, even though no individual player drove in more than 79. The eight starters, however, all had an OPS+ of over 100. George Burns led the team with a .303 average and walked 89 times en route to a .403 on-base percentage.

=== Season standings ===
National League
Team	W	L	Pct.	GB	Home	Road
Boston Braves	94	59	.614	—	51‍–‍25	43‍–‍34
New York Giants	84	70	.545	10½	43‍–‍36	41‍–‍34
St. Louis Cardinals	81	72	.529	13	42‍–‍34	39‍–‍38
Chicago Cubs	78	76	.506	16½	46‍–‍30	32‍–‍46
Brooklyn Robins	75	79	.487	19½	45‍–‍34	30‍–‍45
Philadelphia Phillies	74	80	.481	20½	48‍–‍30	26‍–‍50
Pittsburgh Pirates	69	85	.448	25½	39‍–‍36	30‍–‍49
Cincinnati Reds	60	94	.390	34½	34‍–‍42	26‍–‍52

=== Record vs. opponents ===
1914 National League record Sources:
Team	BSN	BRO	CHC	CIN	NYG	PHI	PIT	STL
Boston	—	9–13	16–6	14–8–2	11–11–1	12–10	17–5–1	15–6–1
Brooklyn	13–9	—	10–12	11–11	9–13	11–11	16–6	5–17
Chicago	6–16	12–10	—	17–5	9–13	12–10	12–10	10–12–2
Cincinnati	8–14–2	11–11	5–17	—	9–13	9–13	8–14–1	10–12
New York	11–11–1	13–9	13–9	13–9	—	12–10	13–9–1	9–13
Philadelphia	10–12	11–11	10–12	13–9	10–12	—	12–10	8–14
Pittsburgh	5–17–1	6–16	10–12	14–8–1	9–13–1	10–12	—	15–7–1
St. Louis	6–15–1	17–5	12–10–2	12–10	13–9	14–8	7–15–1	—

=== Roster ===
1914 New York Giants
Roster
Pitchers: Al Demaree; Eric Erickson; Art Fromme; Al Huenke; Rube Marquard; Christy Mathewson; Marty O'Toole; Hank Ritter; Rube Schauer; Ferdie Schupp; Jeff Tesreau; Hooks Wiltse	Catchers: Elmer Johnson; Larry McLean; Chief Meyers; Harry Smith; Infielders: Desmond Beatty; Fred Brainard; Larry Doyle; Ben Dyer; Art Fletcher; Eddie Grant; Walter Holke; Fred Merkle; Milt Stock	Outfielders: Bob Bescher; George Burns; Red Murray; Sandy Piez; Dave Robertson; Fred Snodgrass; Jim Thorpe; Other batters: Joe Evers	Manager: John McGraw

== Player stats ==
=== Batting ===
==== Starters by position ====
Note: Pos = Position; G = Games played; AB = At bats; H = Hits; Avg. = Batting average; HR = Home runs; RBI = Runs batted in

Pos	Player	G	AB	H	Avg.	HR	RBI
C	Chief Meyers	134	381	109	.286	1	55
1B	Fred Merkle	146	512	132	.258	7	63
2B	Larry Doyle	145	539	140	.260	5	63
SS	Art Fletcher	135	514	147	.286	2	79
3B	Milt Stock	115	365	96	.263	3	41
OF	Bob Bescher	135	512	138	.270	6	35
OF	Fred Snodgrass	113	392	103	.263	0	44
OF	George Burns	154	561	170	.303	3	60

==== Other batters ====
Note: G = Games played; AB = At bats; H = Hits; Avg. = Batting average; HR = Home runs; RBI = Runs batted in

Player	G	AB	H	Avg.	HR	RBI
Eddie Grant	88	282	78	.277	0	29
Dave Robertson	82	256	68	.266	2	32
Larry McLean	79	154	40	.260	0	14
Red Murray	86	139	31	.223	0	23
Mike Donlin	35	31	5	.161	1	3
Jim Thorpe	30	31	6	.194	0	2
Elmer Johnson	11	12	2	.167	0	0
Sandy Piez	37	8	3	.375	0	3
Harry Smith	5	7	3	.429	0	2
Walter Holke	2	6	2	.333	0	0
Fred Brainard	2	5	1	.200	0	0
Ben Dyer	7	4	1	.250	0	0
Desmond Beatty	2	3	0	.000	0	1

=== Pitching ===
==== Starting pitchers ====
Note: G = Games pitched; IP = Innings pitched; W = Wins; L = Losses; ERA = Earned run average; SO = Strikeouts

Player	G	IP	W	L	ERA	SO
Jeff Tesreau	42	322.1	26	10	2.37	189
Christy Mathewson	41	312.0	24	13	3.00	80
Rube Marquard	39	268.0	12	22	3.06	92
Al Demaree	38	224.0	10	17	3.09	89
Eric Erickson	1	5.0	0	1	0.00	3

==== Other pitchers ====
Note: G = Games pitched; IP = Innings pitched; W = Wins; L = Losses; ERA = Earned run average; SO = Strikeouts

Player	G	IP	W	L	ERA	SO
Art Fromme	38	138.0	9	5	3.20	57
Marty O'Toole	10	34.0	1	1	4.24	13

==== Relief pitchers ====
Note: G = Games pitched; W = Wins; L = Losses; SV = Saves; ERA = Earned run average; SO = Strikeouts

Player	G	W	L	SV	ERA	SO
Hooks Wiltse	20	1	1	1	2.84	19
Ferdie Schupp	8	0	0	1	5.82	9
Rube Schauer	6	0	0	0	3.22	6
Hank Ritter	1	1	0	0	1.13	4
Al Huenke	1	0	0	0	4.50	2

== Awards and honors ==
=== League top five finishers ===
George Burns

- NL leader in runs scored (100)
- NL leader in stolen bases (62)
- #2 in NL in on-base percentage (.403)
- #3 in NL in walks drawn (89)

Rube Marquard

- #2 in NL in losses (22)

Jeff Tesreau

- #2 in NL in wins (26)
- #2 in NL in strikeouts (189)
