= Pol Perritt =

American baseball player (1891–1947)

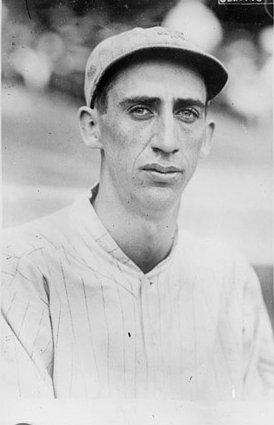
- Perritt in 1917
- Pitcher
- Born: August 30, 1891; Arcadia, Louisiana, US
- Died: October 15, 1947 (aged 56); Shreveport, Louisiana, US
- Batted: Right Threw: Right

MLB debut
- September 7, 1912, for the St. Louis Cardinals

Last MLB appearance
- July 3, 1921, for the Detroit Tigers

MLB statistics
- Win–loss record: 92–78
- Earned run average: 2.89
- Strikeouts: 543
- Stats at Baseball Reference

Teams
- St. Louis Cardinals (1912–1914); New York Giants (1915–1921); Detroit Tigers (1921)

William Dayton "Pol" Perritt (August 30, 1891 – October 15, 1947), sometimes referred to as Poll Perritt or Polly Perritt, was an American baseball pitcher. He played professional baseball for ten years from 1912 to 1921.

A native of Louisiana, Perritt began his career in Major League Baseball with the St. Louis Cardinals from 1912 to 1914. After signing a contract with a Federal League team in December 1915, he reneged in March 1915 and signed a contract with the New York Giants. He was one of the leading pitchers in the National League from 1914 to 1918, compiling an 81–62 win–loss record and a 2.46 earned run average (ERA) during that period. His best season was 1917 when he helped lead the Giants to the National League pennant with a 17–7 record and a 1.88 ERA.

Perritt also briefly played for the Detroit Tigers in 1921. Over the course of 10 major league seasons, he appeared in 256 games and compiled a 92–78 record with a 2.89 ERA.

== Early years ==
Perritt was born in Arcadia, Louisiana, in 1891. He was six feet, two inches tall and weighed 168 pounds. He batted and threw right handed. He played semi-pro baseball in 1910 for a team in Homer, Louisiana, and in 1911 for a team in Minden, Louisiana.

== Professional baseball ==
=== Minor leagues ===
Perritt began his professional baseball career in 1912 in the Cotton States League playing for the Vicksburg Hill Billies and the Greenwood Scouts. He compiled an 18–18 record in that league.

=== St. Louis Cardinals ===
Perritt joined the St. Louis Cardinals in September 1912 and compiled a 1–1 record and 3.19 ERA in six games in the closing weeks of the season. In 1913, Perritt appeared in 36 games for the Cardinals, 21 as a starter, and compiled a 6–14 record and 5.25 ERA.

Perritt emerged as one of the leading pitchers in the National League during the 1914 Cardinals season. He appeared in 41 games, 32 as a starter, and compiled a 16–13 record. He led the National League with 15 batters hit by a pitch and ranked among the National League leaders with a 2.36 ERA (eighth), .552 win percentage (10th), 93 bases on balls (eighth), a 118 adjusted ERA+ rating (ninth), and a 3.7 wins above replacement (WAR) rating (10th).

=== New York Giants ===
Perritt was reportedly "dissatisfied with affairs in St. Louis", and after the 1914 season, he signed a three-year contract to play for the Pittsburgh Rebels of the Federal League. Perritt said at the time that he preferred to play for $2,000 a year for the Rebels than $10,000 a year for the Cardinals. However, New York Giants manager John McGraw entered into a trade with the Cardinals for rights to Perritt and induced Perritt to renege on his contract with the Federal League. Federal League officials reacted angrily to the Giants' signing of Perritt, noting that it "presaged a general renewal of the baseball war" for which the Federal League had set aside a $100,000 war fund.

During the 1915 season, Perritt appeared in 35 games and compiled a 12–18 record with a 2.66 ERA. Perritt's record in 1915 led one writer to brand him a "gold brick", criticizing Perritt's inability to complete games (he had 16 complete games in 29 starts in 1915) and asserting that he "pitched a brand of baseball so weird that it became a joke around the circuit."

In 1916, Perritt appeared in 40 games, 29 as a starter and had 17 complete games. He compiled an 18–11 record with a 2.62 ERA. On September 9, 1916, he won both games in a double-header against the defending National League champion Philadelphia Phillies. Playing in front of 37,000 spectators in New York, Perritt gave up only one run in 18 innings.

Perritt had the best season of his career in 1917 as he helped the Giants win the National League pennant. That year, Perritt appeared in 35 games, compiled a 17–7 record and ranked among the National League leaders with a .708 winning percentage (third) and a 1.88 ERA (third). Despite his strong performance in the regular season, Perritt did not start any games in the 1917 World Series against the Chicago White Sox. He appeared in relief in three World Series games, giving up two earned runs in 8 1/3 innings for a 2.16 ERA in the World Series.

In 1918, Perritt posted his third consecutive season with at least 17 wins. He appeared in 35 games in 1918 and compiled an 18–13 record with a 2.74 ERA. During the three seasons from 1916 to 1918, Perritt appeared in 110 games for the Giants, started 86 games, threw 50 complete games, and compiled a 53–31 record with a 2.43 ERA. However, Perritt developed a reputation for being troublesome during his tenure with the Giants. One sportswriter in 1917 observed: "For let it be known Poll Perritt is a temperamental cuss. Just what he is going to do nobody ever knows. . . . The great trouble with Perritt heretofore has been failure to look upon his profession in all the seriousness characteristic of genius."

Perritt held out at the start of the 1919 season, suggesting he may leave baseball to devote his full attention to oil wells that he owned in Texas. In mid-May, John McGraw finally persuaded him to return. However, Peritt was unable to get into shape and pitched only 19 innings during the 1919 season with a career-high 7.11 ERA. He quit the team and went home in August, and a newspaper account at the time reported that Perritt "had been practically useless all season, having been unable to get into condition." Despite having appeared in only 19 innings and having left the team early, Perritt appealed to the National Commission for a full share of the Giants' prize money for finishing in second place. The New York players were not pleased with Perritt's action, but agreed to a settlement, giving Perritt a half share.

After the 1919 season, Perritt announced that he was retiring from baseball to attend to his oil interests. Perritt did appear in four games late in the 1920 season with the San Antonio Bears in the Texas League. He was recalled to the Giants on September 24, 1920, and appeared in eight games, all as a relief pitcher, at the end of the 1920 season. Despite the lack of playing time, Perritt compiled a career best 1.80 ERA in 15 innings pitched for the 1920 Giants. On October 22, 1920, Perritt also pitched a 2–0 shutout in an exhibition game in Cuba against the Havana team. One writer, after watching Perritt pitch in Cuba, wrote: "Perritt's arm seems to be as good as it ever was and I look forward to him to be a help to the Giants next year."

Perritt returned to the Giants in the spring of 1921. He appeared in five games for the club, compiling a 2–0 record despite an ERA that rose from 1.80 in 1920 to 3.86 in 11 2/3 innings pitched in 1921.

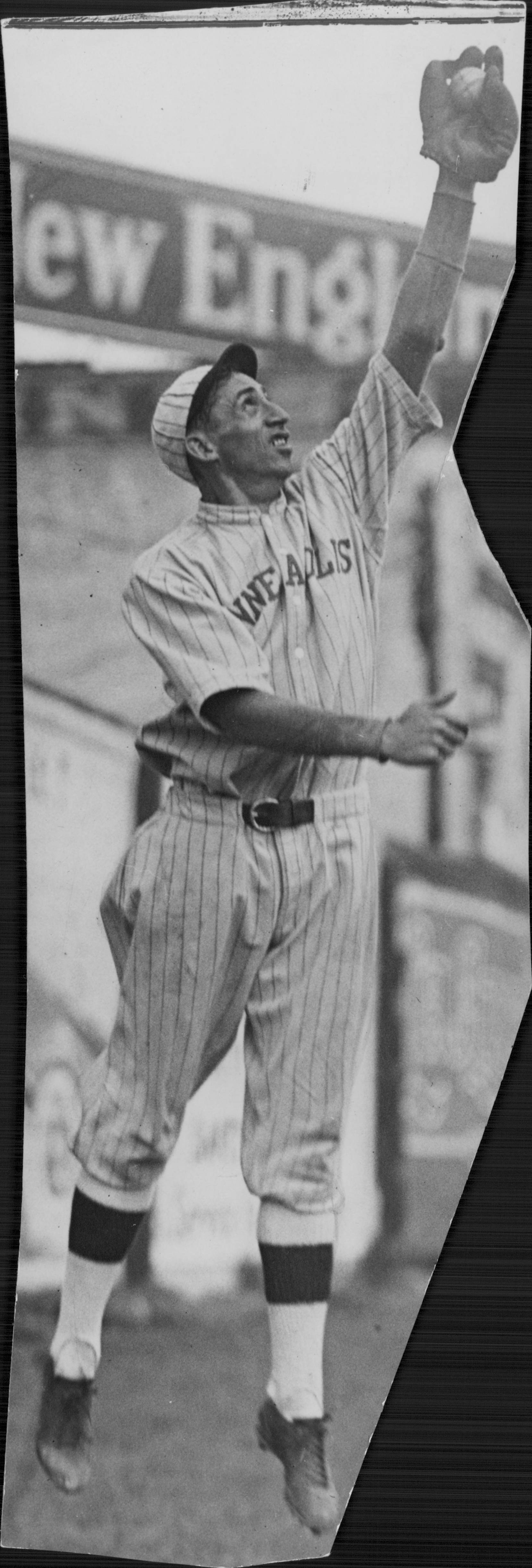
Perritt with the Minneapolis Millers, 1921

=== Detroit and minor leagues ===
In June 1921, the Giants sold Perritt to the Detroit Tigers. He appeared in four games and pitched 13 innings for the Tigers, compiling a 1–0 record and a 4.85 ERA. He was granted an unconditional release by the Tigers on July 11, 1921. After being released by the Tigers, Perritt signed with the Minneapolis Millers of the American Association. He finished the 1921 season with the St. Joseph Saints in the Western League.

== Later years ==
As late as 1923, Perritt was still playing semi-pro baseball with the Cleary Athletic Club in Los Angeles. In 1925, he served as a player-manager for a team in Covina, California. After retiring from baseball, Perritt became an oil operator in Louisiana. He lived in Arcadia, Louisiana, and died in 1947 at age 56 in Shreveport, Louisiana.
