= George McAvoy (baseball) =

American baseball player (1884-1952)

- Pinch-hitter
- Born: March 12, 1884; East Liverpool, Ohio, U.S.
- Died: August 19, 1952 (aged 68); Miami, Florida, U.S.
- Batted: Left Threw: Right

MLB debut
- July 17, 1914, for the Philadelphia Phillies

Last MLB appearance
- July 17, 1914, for the Philadelphia Phillies

MLB statistics
- Games played: 1
- At bats: 1
- Hits: 0
- Stats at Baseball Reference

Teams
- Philadelphia Phillies (1914)

George Robert McAvoy (March 12, 1884 – August 19, 1952) was an American Major League Baseball player who played in 1914 with the Philadelphia Phillies.

McAvoy played in 1 game, going 0-1 as a pinch hitter. Despite his brief appearance in the Majors, he played minor league baseball from 1908 through 1922, and was primarily a second baseman. He also had some time as a player/manager in the minors from 1910-1912 and 1914.

He was born in East Liverpool, Ohio and died in Miami, Florida.
