= Fred Mollenkamp =

American baseball player (1890-1948)

- First baseman
- Born: March 15, 1890; Cincinnati, Ohio, U.S.
- Died: November 1, 1948 (aged 58); Cincinnati, Ohio, U.S.
- Batted: Unknown Threw: Unknown

MLB debut
- August 29, 1914, for the Philadelphia Phillies

Last MLB appearance
- August 30, 1914, for the Philadelphia Phillies

MLB statistics
- Games played: 3
- At bats: 8
- Hits: 1
- Stats at Baseball Reference

Teams
- Philadelphia Phillies (1914)

Frederick Henry Mollenkamp (March 15, 1890 – November 1, 1948) was an American Major League Baseball first baseman who played for the Philadelphia Phillies in 1914.
