= Dixie McArthur =

American baseball player (1892–1986)

- Pitcher
- Born: February 1, 1892; Vernon, Alabama, U.S.
- Died: May 31, 1986 (aged 94); West Point, Mississippi, U.S.
- Batted: Right Threw: Right

MLB debut
- July 10, 1914, for the Pittsburgh Pirates

Last MLB appearance
- July 10, 1914, for the Pittsburgh Pirates

MLB statistics
- Games played: 1
- Innings pitched: 1
- Earned runs: 0
- Stats at Baseball Reference

Teams
- Pittsburgh Pirates (1914)

Oland Alexander "Dixie" McArthur (February 1, 1892 – May 31, 1986) was an American pitcher in Major League Baseball. He played for the Pittsburgh Pirates.
