= Ike McAuley =

American baseball player (1891–1928)

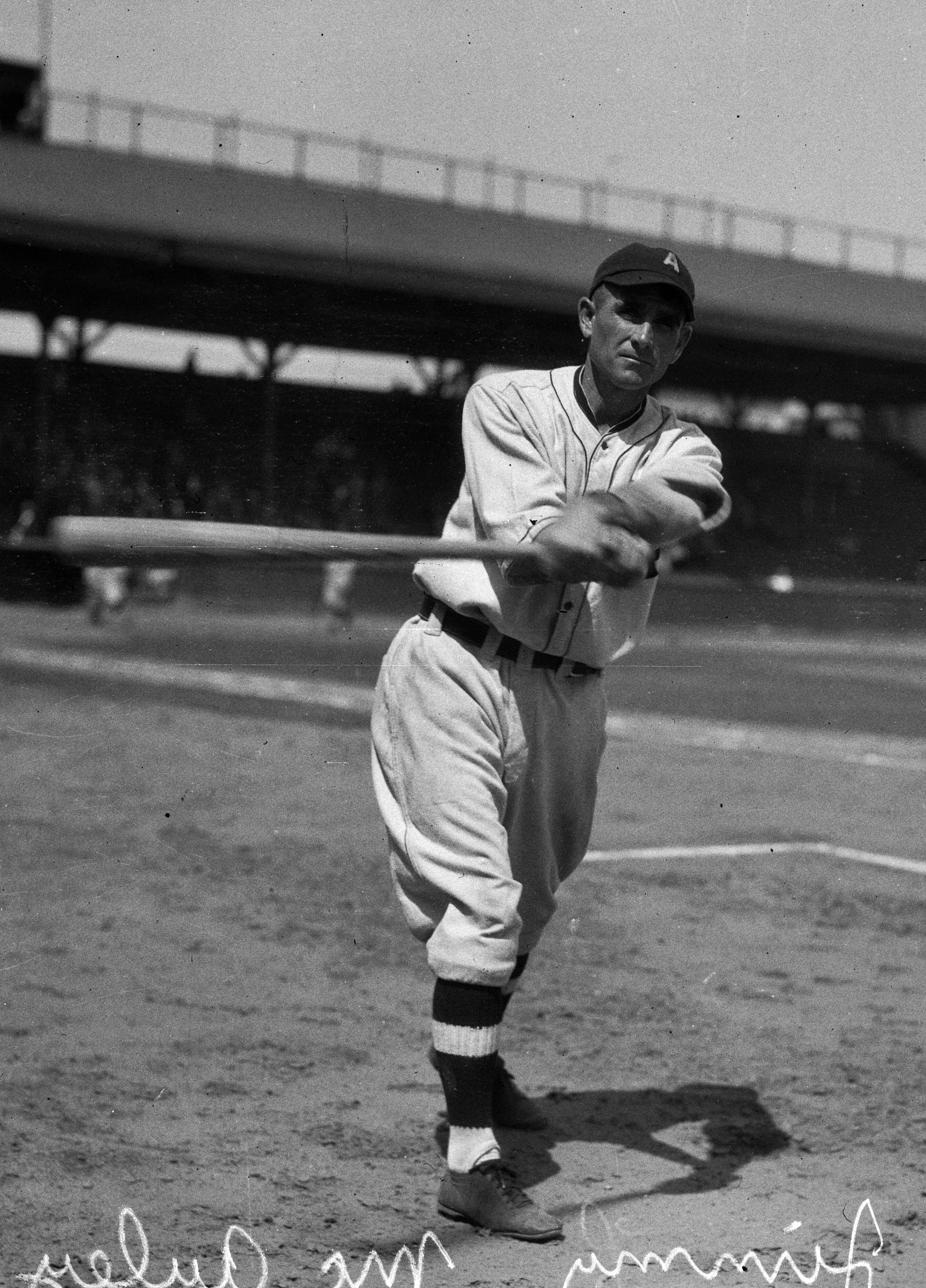
- McAuley during his time with the Los Angeles Angels
- Shortstop
- Born: August 19, 1891; Wichita, Kansas, U.S.
- Died: April 6, 1928 (aged 36); Des Moines, Iowa, U.S.
- Batted: Switch Threw: Right

MLB debut
- September 10, 1914, for the Pittsburgh Pirates

Last MLB appearance
- May 30, 1925, for the Chicago Cubs

MLB statistics
- Batting average: .246
- Home Rus: 0
- Runs batted in: 13
- Stats at Baseball Reference

Teams
- Pittsburgh Pirates (1914–1916); St. Louis Cardinals (1917); Chicago Cubs (1925)

James Earl "Ike" McAuley (August 19, 1891 – April 6, 1928), born in Wichita, Kansas, was an American shortstop for the Pittsburgh Pirates (1914–16), St. Louis Cardinals (1917) and Chicago Cubs (1925). From 1920–25, he played for the minor-league Los Angeles Angels.

In five seasons he played in sixty-four games and had 179 at bats, fourteen runs, forty-four hits, eight doubles, two triples, thirteen RBI, one stolen base, eleven walks, a .246 batting average, a .293 on-base percentage, a .313 slugging percentage, fifty-six total bases and thirteen sacrifice hits.

He died in Des Moines, Iowa at the age of thirty-six.

== Sources ==
- Career statistics from Baseball Reference · Baseball Reference (Minors) · Retrosheet · Baseball Almanac
