= Pete Falsey =

American baseball player (1891–1976)

- Pinch runner / pinch hitter
- Born: April 24, 1891; New Haven, Connecticut
- Died: May 23, 1976 (aged 85); Los Angeles, California
- Batted: Left Threw: Left

MLB debut
- July 16, 1914, for the Pittsburgh Pirates

Last MLB appearance
- August 5, 1914, for the Pittsburgh Pirates

MLB statistics
- Games played: 3
- At bats: 1
- Hits: 0
- Stats at Baseball Reference

Teams
- Pittsburgh Pirates (1914)

Peter James Falsey (April 24, 1891 – May 23, 1976) was a Major League Baseball player with the Pittsburgh Pirates. Falsey played only in 1914 and had only one at-bat in three games. He went 0-1. Falsey was born in New Haven, Connecticut, and died in Los Angeles, California, on May 23, 1976.
