= Zip Collins =

American baseball player (1892–1983)

- Outfielder
- Born: May 4, 1892; Brooklyn, New York, U.S.
- Died: December 19, 1983 (aged 91); Manassas, Virginia, U.S.
- Batted: Left Threw: Left

MLB debut
- July 31, 1914, for the Pittsburgh Pirates

Last MLB appearance
- September 27, 1921, for the Philadelphia Athletics

MLB statistics
- Batting average: .253
- Home runs: 2
- Runs batted in: 63
- Stats at Baseball Reference

Teams
- Pittsburgh Pirates (1914–1915); Boston Braves (1915–1917); Philadelphia Athletics (1921)

John Edgar Collins (May 4, 1892 – December 19, 1983) was an American Major League Baseball outfielder.

== Biography ==
He was born on May 4, 1892, in Brooklyn, New York. He played for the Pittsburgh Pirates during the 1914 and 1915 seasons, the Boston Braves from 1915 to 1917, and the Philadelphia Athletics during the 1921 season.

In 281 games over five seasons, Collins posted a .253 batting average (232-for-916) with 124 runs, 2 home runs and 63 RBI. He recorded a .946 fielding percentage playing at all three outfield positions.

He died on December 19, 1983, aged 91, in Manassas, Virginia.
