= Frank Fletcher (baseball) =

American baseball player (1891-1974)

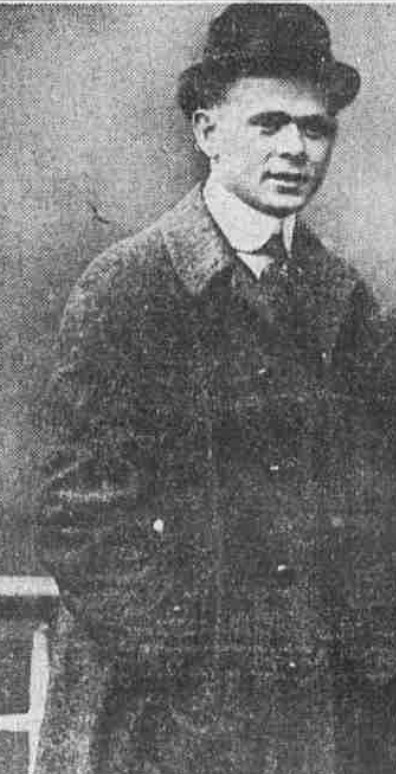
- Shortstop / Third baseman
- Born: March 6, 1891; Hildreth, Illinois, U.S.
- Died: October 7, 1974 (aged 83); St. Petersburg, Florida, U.S.
- Batted: Right Threw: Right

MLB debut
- July 14, 1914, for the Philadelphia Phillies

Last MLB appearance
- July 14, 1914, for the Philadelphia Phillies

MLB statistics
- Games played: 1
- At bats: 1
- Hits: 0
- Stats at Baseball Reference

Teams
- Philadelphia Phillies (1914)

Oliver Frank Fletcher (March 6, 1891 – October 7, 1974) was an American professional baseball player. Born in Hildreth, Illinois, he played shortstop and third base, and batted and threw right-handed. He sometimes played under the name Fletcher Franks.

Fletcher played minor league baseball with the Harrisburg Coal Miners of the Kentucky–Illinois–Tennessee League and the Syracuse Stars of the New York State League. He originally played as a third baseman, but switched to shortstop upon joining the Stars in 1914. The Syracuse Herald called him "one of the snappiest young players" in his league.

Fletcher made his only major league appearance in 1914, when he played in one game for the Philadelphia Phillies. He struck out in his only at-bat. Phillies manager Pat Moran gave him a trial during the next season, but he did not appear in any major league games that year.

Fletcher later served as a coach for Clearwater High School's baseball team. He died in St. Petersburg, Florida in 1974.
