= Fritz Scheeren =

American baseball player (1891–1973)

- Outfielder
- Born: July 1, 1891; Kokomo, Indiana
- Died: June 17, 1973 (aged 81); Kittanning, Pennsylvania
- Batted: Right Threw: Right

MLB debut
- September 14, 1914, for the Pittsburgh Pirates

Last MLB appearance
- May 11, 1915, for the Pittsburgh Pirates

MLB statistics
- Batting average: .265
- Home runs: 1
- Runs batted in: 2
- Stats at Baseball Reference

Teams
- Pittsburgh Pirates (1914–1915)

Frederick "Fritz" Scheeren (July 1, 1891 – June 17, 1973), nicknamed "Dutch", was an outfielder in Major League Baseball. He played for the Pittsburgh Pirates.
