= Elmer Jacobs =

American baseball player (1892–1958)

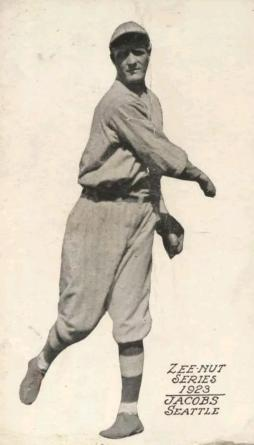
- Pitcher
- Born: August 10, 1892; Salem, Missouri, U.S.
- Died: February 10, 1958 (aged 65); Salem, Missouri, U.S.
- Batted: Right Threw: Right

MLB debut
- April 23, 1914, for the Philadelphia Phillies

Last MLB appearance
- September 13, 1927, for the Chicago White Sox

MLB statistics
- Win–loss record: 50–81
- Earned run average: 3.55
- Strikeouts: 336
- Stats at Baseball Reference

Teams
- Philadelphia Phillies (1914); Pittsburgh Pirates (1916–1918); Philadelphia Phillies (1918–1919); St. Louis Cardinals (1919–1920); Chicago Cubs (1924–1925); Chicago White Sox (1927)

William Elmer Jacobs (August 10, 1892 – February 10, 1958) was an American pitcher in Major League Baseball from 1914 to 1927. He played for the Philadelphia Phillies, Pittsburgh Pirates, St. Louis Cardinals, Chicago Cubs, and Chicago White Sox. Jacobs' key pitch was the curveball. In 1926, he was suspended for 10 days after being caught with foreign substances on the mound.
