= Lee Dressen =

American baseball player (1889–1931)

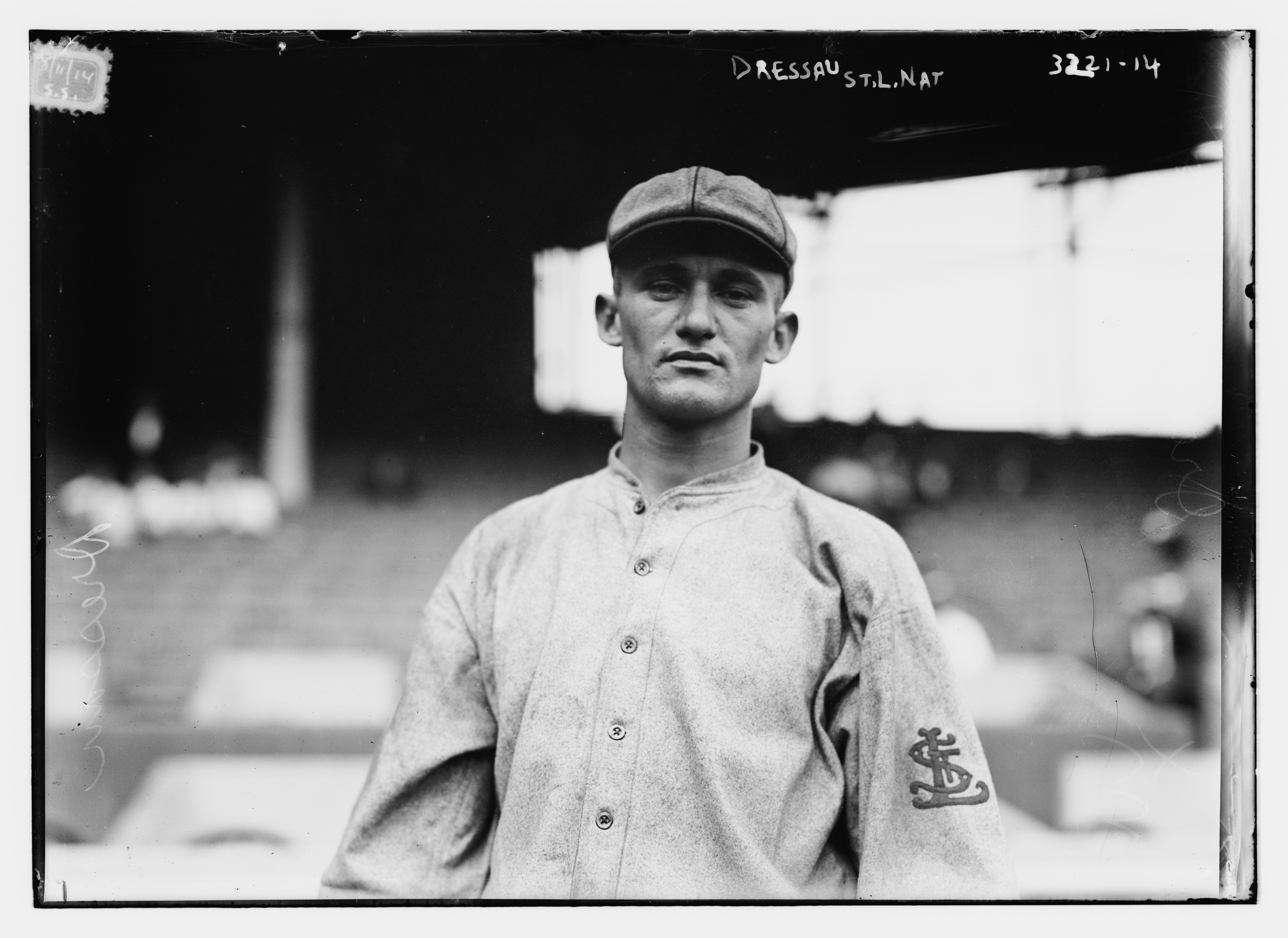
- Shortstop
- Born: July 23, 1889; Ellinwood, Kansas
- Died: June 30, 1931 (aged 41); Diller, Nebraska
- Batted: Left Threw: Left

MLB debut
- April 21, 1914, for the St. Louis Cardinals

Last MLB appearance
- June 1, 1918, for the Detroit Tigers

MLB statistics
- Batting average: .205
- Home runs: 0
- Runs batted in: 9
- Stats at Baseball Reference

Teams
- St. Louis Cardinals (1914); Detroit Tigers (1918)

Leo August "Lee" Dressen (July 23, 1889 – June 30, 1931) was a Major League Baseball first baseman. He played for the St. Louis Cardinals in 1914 and the Detroit Tigers in 1918.
