= Sam Brenegan =

American baseball player (1890–1956)

- Catcher
- Born: September 1, 1890; Galesville, Wisconsin, U.S.
- Died: April 20, 1956; Galesville, Wisconsin, U.S.
- Batted: Left Threw: Right

MLB debut
- April 24, 1914, for the Pittsburgh Pirates

Last MLB appearance
- April 24, 1914, for the Pittsburgh Pirates

MLB statistics
- Batting average: .000
- Home Rus: 0
- Runs batted in: 0
- Stats at Baseball Reference

Teams
- Pittsburgh Pirates (1914)

Sam Brenegan (born Olaf Selmar Brenegan; September 1, 1890 – April 20, 1956) was an American Major League Baseball catcher. He was a member of the Pittsburgh Pirates in 1914. During his one and only game, Brenegan was hit in the hand while catching, which allowed a baserunner to move from second to third. For some time afterwards, any catcher who was hit hard in the hand by the ball was said to have "pulled a brenegan".
