= Pat Hilly =

American baseball player (1887-1953)

- Right fielder
- Born: February 22, 1887; Fostoria, Ohio
- Died: July 25, 1953 (aged 66); Eureka, Missouri
- Batted: Right Threw: Right

MLB debut
- May 7, 1914, for the Philadelphia Phillies

Last MLB appearance
- September 26, 1914, for the Philadelphia Phillies

MLB statistics
- Games played: 8
- At bats: 10
- Hits: 3
- Stats at Baseball Reference

Teams
- Philadelphia Phillies (1914)

William Edward Hilly (February 22, 1887 – July 25, 1953) was an American Major League Baseball right fielder who played for the Philadelphia Phillies in 1914. Hilly's actual last name was Hilgerink.
