= Chick Keating =

American baseball player (1891–1959)

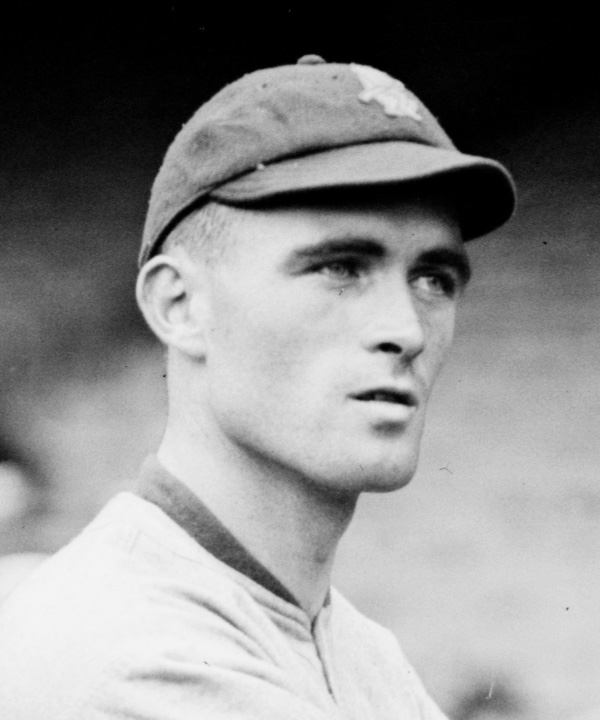
- Shortstop
- Born: August 8, 1891; Philadelphia, Pennsylvania, U.S.
- Died: July 13, 1959 (aged 67); Philadelphia, Pennsylvania, U.S.
- Batted: Right Threw: Right

MLB debut
- September 26, 1913, for the Chicago Cubs

Last MLB appearance
- September 16, 1926, for the Philadelphia Phillies

MLB statistics
- Games played: 30
- At bats: 45
- Hits: 4
- Stats at Baseball Reference

Teams
- Chicago Cubs (1913–1915); Philadelphia Phillies (1926)

Walter Francis "Chick" Keating (August 8, 1891 – July 13, 1959) was an American shortstop in Major League Baseball. He played for the Chicago Cubs and Philadelphia Phillies.
