= Jake Kafora =

American baseball player (1888–1928)

- Catcher
- Born: October 16, 1888; Chicago, Illinois
- Died: March 23, 1928 (aged 39); Chicago, Illinois
- Batted: Right Threw: Right

MLB debut
- October 5, 1913, for the Pittsburgh Pirates

Last MLB appearance
- September 7, 1914, for the Pittsburgh Pirates

MLB statistics
- Batting average: .125
- Home runs: 0
- Runs batted in: 0
- Stats at Baseball Reference

Teams
- Pittsburgh Pirates (1913–1914)

Frank Jacob Kafora (October 16, 1888 – March 23, 1928) was a baseball player for the Pittsburgh Pirates from 1913 to 1914. He started playing with the Pittsburgh Pirates at 24 years old. He was born and Chicago, Illinois and died in Chicago.
