= Pat Kilhullen =

American baseball player (1890–1922)

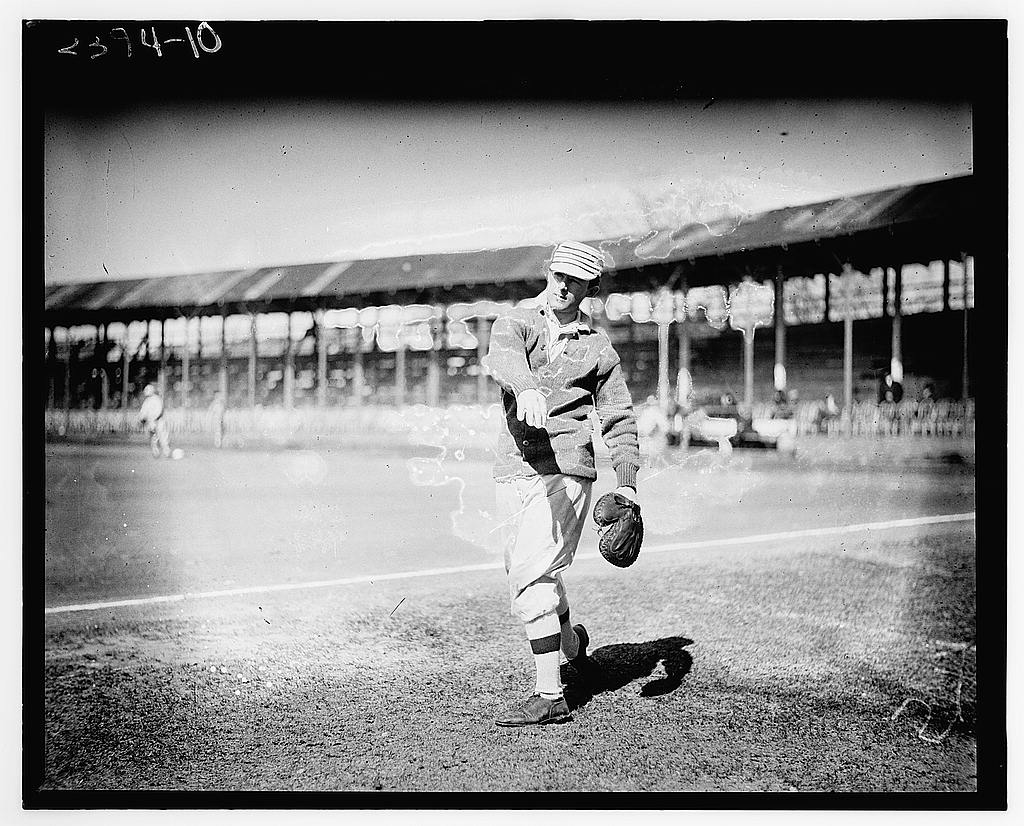
- Catcher
- Born: August 10, 1890; Carbondale, Pennsylvania, U.S.
- Died: October 25, 1922 (aged 32); San Leandro, California, U.S.
- Batted: Right Threw: Right

MLB debut
- June 10, 1914, for the Pittsburgh Pirates

Last MLB appearance
- June 10, 1914, for the Pittsburgh Pirates

MLB statistics
- Games played: 1
- At bats: 1
- Hits: 0
- Stats at Baseball Reference

Teams
- Pittsburgh Pirates (1914)

Joseph Isadore "Pat" Kilhullen (August 10, 1890 – October 25, 1922) was an American catcher in Major League Baseball. He played for the Pittsburgh Pirates.
