= Joe Kelly (1910s outfielder) =

American baseball player (1886–1977)

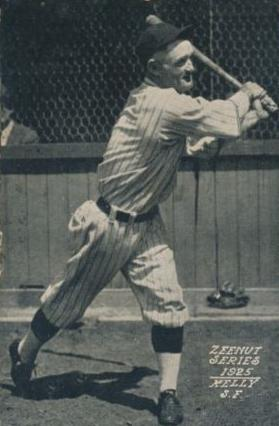
- Outfielder
- Born: September 23, 1886; Weir City, Kansas, U.S.
- Died: August 16, 1977 (aged 90); St. Joseph, Missouri, U.S.
- Batted: Right Threw: Right

MLB debut
- April 14, 1914, for the Pittsburgh Pirates

Last MLB appearance
- May 27, 1919, for the Boston Braves

MLB statistics
- Batting average: .224
- Home runs: 6
- Runs batted in: 117
- Stats at Baseball Reference

Teams
- Pittsburgh Pirates (1914); Chicago Cubs (1916); Boston Braves (1917–1919)

Joseph Henry Kelly (September 23, 1886 – August 16, 1977) was an American professional baseball player. He played all or part of five seasons in Major League Baseball between 1914 and 1919 for the Pittsburgh Pirates, Chicago Cubs, and Boston Braves, primarily as an outfielder.

Kelly had an extensive career in minor league baseball, spanning 23 seasons. He began playing professionally in 1908 with the Tulsa Oilers, and played until 1930, which he spent with the Oklahoma City Indians. He spent the last five years of his career as a player-manager.
