= Herb Kelly =

American baseball player (1892–1973)

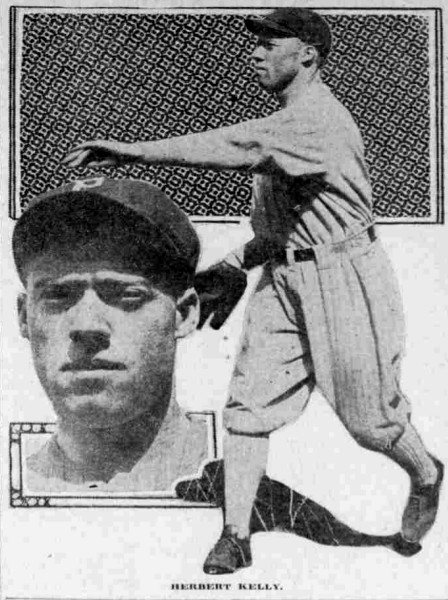
- Pitcher
- Born: June 4, 1892; Mobile, Alabama, U.S.
- Died: May 18, 1973 (aged 80); Torrance, California, U.S.
- Batted: Left Threw: Left

MLB debut
- September 25, 1914, for the Pittsburgh Pirates

Last MLB appearance
- September 6, 1915, for the Pittsburgh Pirates

MLB statistics
- Win–loss record: 1–3
- Earned run average: 2.95
- Strikeouts: 12
- Stats at Baseball Reference

Teams
- Pittsburgh Pirates (1914–1915)

Herbert Barrett Kelly (June 4, 1892 – May 18, 1973) was a Major League Baseball pitcher who played with the Pittsburgh Pirates in 1914 and 1915.
