= Casey Hageman =

American baseball player (1887–1964)

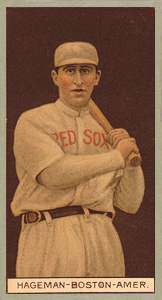
- Pitcher
- Born: May 12, 1887; Mount Oliver, Pennsylvania, U.S.
- Died: April 1, 1964 (aged 76); New Bedford, Pennsylvania, U.S.
- Batted: Left Threw: Right

MLB debut
- September 18, 1911, for the Boston Red Sox

Last MLB appearance
- October 3, 1914, for the Chicago Cubs

MLB statistics
- Win–loss record: 3-7
- Earned run average: 3.07
- Strikeouts: 47
- Stats at Baseball Reference

Teams
- Boston Red Sox (1911–1912); St. Louis Cardinals (1914); Chicago Cubs (1914)

Kurt Moritz "Casey" Hageman (May 12, 1887 – April 1, 1964) was an American pitcher in Major League Baseball who played between 1911 and 1914 for the Boston Red Sox (1911–1912), St. Louis Cardinals (1914) and Chicago Cubs (1914).

Hageman batted and threw right-handed.

== Formative years ==
A native of Mount Oliver, Pennsylvania, Hageman was born on May 12, 1887. A student at Geneva College, he was signed by the Boston Red Sox following his graduation.

== Career ==
During a three-season career, Hageman posted a 3–7 record with 47 strikeouts and a 3.07 earned run average in 32 appearances, including 11 starts, four complete games, 18 games finished, one save, and 120.1 innings of work.

While pitching for the Grand Rapids Stags of the Ohio State League, Hageman fatally beaned Dayton Veterans second baseman Charles "Cupid" Pinkney on September 14, 1909.

== Death ==
Hageman died in New Bedford, Pennsylvania, on April 1, 1964, at the age of seventy-six.
