= 1912 Pittsburgh Pirates season =

1912 Pittsburgh Pirates
- League: National League
- Ballpark: Forbes Field
- City: Pittsburgh, Pennsylvania
- Owners: Barney Dreyfuss
- Managers: Fred Clarke

The 1912 Pittsburgh Pirates season was a season in American baseball, the 31st in franchise history. The team finished second in the National League with a record of 93–58, 10 games behind the New York Giants.

During the season, Chief Wilson set a major league record by hitting 36 triples in a single season. After 118 games, Chief Wilson already had 33 triples and was on pace to get 43 triples.

In their 23–4 win against the Cincinnati Reds on April 27, the Pirates recorded a .628 batting average, the highest by any team in a single game from 1901 onwards.

== Regular season ==
=== Season standings ===
National League
Team	W	L	Pct.	GB	Home	Road
New York Giants	103	48	.682	—	49‍–‍25	54‍–‍23
Pittsburgh Pirates	93	58	.616	10	44‍–‍31	49‍–‍27
Chicago Cubs	91	59	.607	11½	46‍–‍30	45‍–‍29
Cincinnati Reds	75	78	.490	29	45‍–‍32	30‍–‍46
Philadelphia Phillies	73	79	.480	30½	34‍–‍41	39‍–‍38
St. Louis Cardinals	63	90	.412	41	37‍–‍40	26‍–‍50
Brooklyn Trolley Dodgers	58	95	.379	46	33‍–‍43	25‍–‍52
Boston Braves	52	101	.340	52	31‍–‍47	21‍–‍54

=== Record vs. opponents ===
1912 National League record Sources:
Team	BSN	BRO	CHC	CIN	NYG	PHI	PIT	STL
Boston	—	9–13	5–17	11–11	3–18–1	10–12	4–18–1	10–12
Brooklyn	13–9	—	5–17	6–16	6–16	9–13	8–14	11–10
Chicago	17–5	17–5	—	11–10–1	13–9–1	10–10	8–13	15–7
Cincinnati	11–11	16–6	10–11–1	—	6–16–1	8–14	11–11	13–9
New York	18–3–1	16–6	9–13–1	16–6–1	—	17–5	12–8	15–7
Philadelphia	12–10	13–9	10–10	14–8	5–17	—	8–14	11–11
Pittsburgh	18–4–1	14–8	13–8	11–11	8–12	14–8	—	15–7
St. Louis	12–10	10–11	7–15	9–13	7–15	11–11	7–15	—

=== Notable transactions ===
- September 16, 1912: Everitt Booe was drafted by the Pirates from the Fort Wayne Railroaders in the 1912 rule 5 draft.

=== Roster ===
1912 Pittsburgh Pirates
Roster
Pitchers: Babe Adams; Howie Camnitz; King Cole; Wilbur Cooper; Jack Ferry; Harry Gardner; Claude Hendrix; Lefty Leifield; Marty O'Toole; Hank Robinson; Sherry Smith; Ed Warner	Catchers: Earl Blackburn; George Gibson; Billy Kelly; Mike Simon; Infielders: Art Butler; Bobby Byrne; Ona Dodd; Stan Gray; Alex McCarthy; Bill McKechnie; Dots Miller; Jim Viox; Honus Wagner	Outfielders: Max Carey; Mike Donlin; Stump Edington; Solly Hofman; Ham Hyatt; Tommy Leach; Ed Mensor; Ovid Nicholson; Wally Rehg; Chief Wilson; Other batters: Rivington Bisland; Ralph Capron; Mickey Keliher	Manager: Fred Clarke

== Player stats ==
=== Batting ===
==== Starters by position ====
Note: Pos = Position; G = Games played; AB = At bats; H = Hits; Avg. = Batting average; HR = Home runs; RBI = Runs batted in

Pos	Player	G	AB	H	Avg.	HR	RBI
C	George Gibson	95	300	72	.240	2	35
1B	Dots Miller	148	567	156	.275	4	86
2B	Alex McCarthy	111	401	111	.277	1	41
3B	Bobby Byrne	130	528	152	.288	3	35
SS	Honus Wagner	145	558	181	.324	7	102
OF	Mike Donlin	77	244	77	.316	2	35
OF	Chief Wilson	152	583	175	.300	11	95
OF	Max Carey	150	587	177	.302	5	68

==== Other batters ====
Note: G = Games played; AB = At bats; H = Hits; Avg. = Batting average; HR = Home runs; RBI = Runs batted in

Player	G	AB	H	Avg.	HR	RBI
Art Butler	43	154	42	.273	1	14
Billy Kelly	48	132	42	.318	1	12
Mike Simon	42	113	34	.301	0	10
Ed Mensor	39	99	26	.263	0	1
Tommy Leach	28	97	29	.299	0	18
Ham Hyatt	46	97	28	.289	0	21
Bill McKechnie	24	73	18	.247	0	4
Jim Viox	33	70	13	.186	1	6
Solly Hofman	17	53	15	.283	0	3
Stump Edington	15	53	16	.302	0	14
Stan Gray	6	20	5	.250	0	2
Ovid Nicholson	6	11	5	.455	0	1
Ona Dodd	5	9	0	.000	0	1
Wally Rehg	8	9	0	.000	0	0
Rivington Bisland	1	1	0	.000	0	0
Earl Blackburn	1	0	0	----	0	0
Ralph Capron	1	0	0	----	0	0
Mickey Keliher	2	0	0	----	0	0

=== Pitching ===
==== Starting pitchers ====
Note: G = Games pitched; IP = Innings pitched; W = Wins; L = Losses; ERA = Earned run average; SO = Strikeouts

Player	G	IP	W	L	ERA	SO
Claude Hendrix	39	288.2	24	9	2.59	176
Howie Camnitz	41	276.2	22	12	2.83	121
Marty O'Toole	37	275.1	15	17	2.71	150
Babe Adams	28	170.1	11	8	2.91	63

==== Other pitchers ====
Note: G = Games pitched; IP = Innings pitched; W = Wins; L = Losses; ERA = Earned run average; SO = Strikeouts

Player	G	IP	W	L	ERA	SO
Hank Robinson	33	175.0	12	7	2.26	79
King Cole	12	49.0	2	2	6.43	11
Ed Warner	11	45.0	1	1	3.60	13
Jack Ferry	11	39.0	2	0	3.00	10
Wilbur Cooper	6	38.0	3	0	1.66	30

==== Relief pitchers ====
Note: G = Games pitched; IP = Innings pitched; W = Wins; L = Losses; ERA = Earned run average; SO = Strikeouts

Player	G	IP	W	L	ERA	SO
Lefty Leifield	6	23.2	1	2	4.18	8
Sherry Smith	3	4.0	0	0	6.75	3
Harry Gardner	1	0.1	0	0	0.00	0

=== Chief Wilson's 36 triples ===
Triple	Game	Date	Inning	Location	Opposing Pitcher	Team
1	2	April 13, 1912	2nd	Robison Field	Bill Steele	St. Louis Cardinals
2	6	April 18, 1912	9th	Forbes Field	Slim Sallee	St. Louis Cardinals
3	9	April 23, 1912	6th	West Side Park II	Mordecai Brown	Chicago Cubs
4	11	April 27, 1912	1st	Forbes Field	Art Fromme	Cincinnati Reds
5	11	April 27, 1912	8th	Forbes Field	Hanson Horsey	Cincinnati Reds
6	15	May 3, 1912	3rd	Forbes Field	Larry Cheney	Chicago Cubs
7	16	May 4, 1912	4th	Forbes Field	Ed Reulbach	Chicago Cubs
8	25	May 21, 1912	7th	Forbes Field	Bill McTigue	Boston Braves
9	29	May 25, 1912	4th	Forbes Field	Jimmy Lavender	Chicago Cubs
10	29	May 25, 1912	6th	Forbes Field	Jimmy Lavender	Chicago Cubs
11	33	May 30, 1912	3rd	Forbes Field	Slim Sallee	St. Louis Cardinals
12	48	June 17, 1912	8th	Polo Grounds III	Rube Marquard	New York Giants
13	49	June 18, 1912	9th	Polo Grounds III	Doc Crandall	New York Giants
14	50	June 19, 1912	4th	Forbes Field	Joe Willis	St. Louis Cardinals
15	51	June 20, 1912	2nd	Redland Field	Bobby Keefe	Cincinnati Reds
16	51	June 20, 1912	10th	Redland Field	Harry Gaspar	Cincinnati Reds
17	52	June 20, 1912	6th	Redland Field	Art Fromme	Cincinnati Reds
18	64	July 2, 1912	8th	Forbes Field	Larry Cheney	Chicago Cubs
19	65	July 4, 1912	4th	Forbes Field	Ben Taylor	Cincinnati Reds
20	70	July 8, 1912	8th	Forbes Field	Toots Schultz	Philadelphia Phillies
21	77	July 16, 1912	4th	Forbes Field	Earl Yingling	Brooklyn Trolley Dodgers
22	78	July 17, 1912	9th	Forbes Field	Christy Mathewson	New York Giants
23	79	July 19, 1912	3rd	Forbes Field	Rube Marquard	New York Giants
24	82	July 22, 1912	3rd	Forbes Field	Buster Brown	Boston Braves
25	84	July 25, 1912	1st	Forbes Field	Eddie Stack	Brooklyn Trolley Dodgers
26	85	July 26, 1912	1st	National League Park	Earl Moore	Philadelphia Phillies
27	99	August 10, 1912	6th	Washington Park II	Cliff Curtis	Brooklyn Trolley Dodgers
28	106	August 16, 1912	7th	Forbes Field	Grover Cleveland Alexander	Philadelphia Phillies
29	114	August 23, 1912	9th	Forbes Field	Jeff Tesreau	New York Giants
30	116	August 26, 1912	6th	Forbes Field	Otto Hess	Boston Braves
31	117	August 26, 1912	6th	Forbes Field	Ed Donnelly	Boston Braves
32	117	August 26, 1912	8th	Forbes Field	Ed Donnelly	Boston Braves
33	118	August 27, 1912	4th	Forbes Field	Walt Dickson	Boston Braves
34	129	September 7, 1912	6th	Robison Field	Pol Perritt	St. Louis Cardinals
35	148	September 29, 1912	8th	West Side Park II	Ed Reulbach	Chicago Cubs
36	152	October 6, 1912	9th	Redland Field	Frank Gregory	Cincinnati Reds
