= 1912 Cincinnati Reds season =

1912 Cincinnati Reds
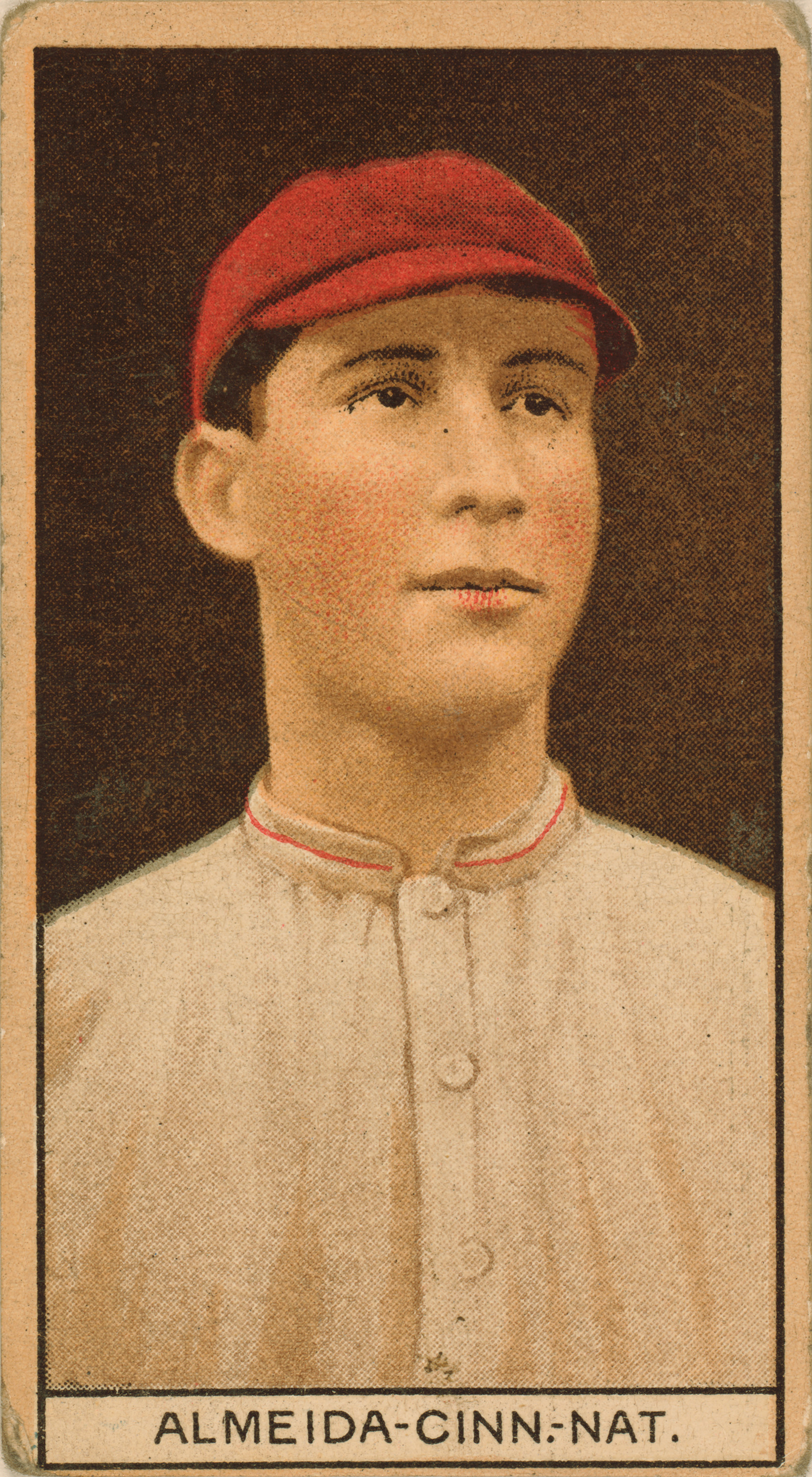
- League: National League
- Ballpark: Redland Field
- City: Cincinnati, Ohio
- Owners: Garry Herrmann
- Managers: Hank O'Day

The 1912 Cincinnati Reds season was a season in American baseball. The team finished fourth in the National League with a record of 75–78, 29 games behind the New York Giants. This was the inaugural year of the Reds' new stadium, Redland Field, later known as Crosley Field.

== Offseason ==
The Reds moved into a new stadium beginning in the 1912 season, as the club moved from the Palace of the Fans to Redland Field. The new stadium had a seating capacity of 20,696, which was up from the 12,000 capacity at Palace of the Fans.

Cincinnati replaced their manager Clark Griffith, following a disappointing 1911 season, and replaced him with Hank O'Day. O'Day, a former pitcher from 1884 to 1890, had a 73–110 record and a 3.74 ERA in his career. O'Day was also a former umpire, and notably was behind the plate in the first ever World Series game in 1903. He was also the home plate umpire who made the initial ruling on Merkle's Boner. He did not have any previous managerial experience.

The Reds sold shortstop Tom Downey to the Philadelphia Phillies on December 29. Cincinnati shifted third baseman Eddie Grant to shortstop, where he split playing time with Jimmy Esmond, as the club named Art Phelan their new third baseman. Phelan, only 23 years old, saw limited action with Cincinnati in 1910, before spending the 1911 season in the minors.

== Regular season ==
Cincinnati had a tough season offensively, as the club ranked last in batting average (.256), on base percentage (.323), hits (1310), doubles (183) and home runs (21). First baseman Dick Hoblitzell hit .294 and had 85 RBI, however, his home run total dropped from eleven in 1911 to only two in 1912. Outfielder Armando Marsans led the Reds with a .317 batting average, while hitting one home run and 38 RBI in 110 games. Outfielder Bob Bescher led the National League in stolen bases with 67, and he had a .281 batting average with four home runs and 38 RBI, and scored 120 runs. Outfielder Mike Mitchell batted .283 with four home runs and 78 RBI in 147 games.

The pitching rotation was led by Rube Benton, as in his first full season as a starting pitcher, he appeared in a National League high 50 games, starting 39 of them. Benton had a record of 18–20 with a 3.10 ERA while pitching 302 innings, striking out 162 batters and had 22 complete games. George Suggs led Cincinnati in wins, as he was 19–16 with a 2.94 ERA in 42 games, pitching 303 innings and recording a team high 25 complete games. Art Fromme finished the year with a 16–18 record in 43 games, throwing 296 innings and 23 complete games, while having a team best 2.74 ERA.

=== Season summary ===
The club got off to a surprising start of the season, as Cincinnati had a 22–6 record in their first 28 games, leading the National League by 1.5 games over the New York Giants. The Reds lost 10 of their next 11 games to fall out of first place, and could never recover. Cincinnati would eventually fall under .500, and finished the season with a 75–78 record, an improvement of five games over 1911, but finished 29 games behind the New York Giants for the pennant.

=== Season standings ===
National League
Team	W	L	Pct.	GB	Home	Road
New York Giants	103	48	.682	—	49‍–‍25	54‍–‍23
Pittsburgh Pirates	93	58	.616	10	44‍–‍31	49‍–‍27
Chicago Cubs	91	59	.607	11½	46‍–‍30	45‍–‍29
Cincinnati Reds	75	78	.490	29	45‍–‍32	30‍–‍46
Philadelphia Phillies	73	79	.480	30½	34‍–‍41	39‍–‍38
St. Louis Cardinals	63	90	.412	41	37‍–‍40	26‍–‍50
Brooklyn Trolley Dodgers	58	95	.379	46	33‍–‍43	25‍–‍52
Boston Braves	52	101	.340	52	31‍–‍47	21‍–‍54

=== Record vs. opponents ===
1912 National League record Sources:
Team	BSN	BRO	CHC	CIN	NYG	PHI	PIT	STL
Boston	—	9–13	5–17	11–11	3–18–1	10–12	4–18–1	10–12
Brooklyn	13–9	—	5–17	6–16	6–16	9–13	8–14	11–10
Chicago	17–5	17–5	—	11–10–1	13–9–1	10–10	8–13	15–7
Cincinnati	11–11	16–6	10–11–1	—	6–16–1	8–14	11–11	13–9
New York	18–3–1	16–6	9–13–1	16–6–1	—	17–5	12–8	15–7
Philadelphia	12–10	13–9	10–10	14–8	5–17	—	8–14	11–11
Pittsburgh	18–4–1	14–8	13–8	11–11	8–12	14–8	—	15–7
St. Louis	12–10	10–11	7–15	9–13	7–15	11–11	7–15	—

=== Roster ===
1912 Cincinnati Reds
Roster
Pitchers: Jim Bagby; Rube Benton; Bill Cramer; Dixie Davis; Bill Doak; Ed Donalds; Sam Fletcher; John Frill; Art Fromme; Harry Gaspar; Frank Gregory; Frank Harter; Hanson Horsey; Bert Humphries; Bobby Keefe; Howard McGraner; Gene Moore; Gene Packard; Bill Prough; Frank Smith; George Suggs; Ben Taylor; Chuck Tompkins; Ralph Works	Catchers: Earl Blackburn; Tommy Clarke; Larry McLean; Hank Severeid; Infielders: Rafael Almeida; Dick Egan; Jimmy Esmond; Eddie Grant; Dick Hoblitzel; Tex McDonald; Art Phelan	Outfielders: Johnny Bates; Bob Bescher; Pete Knisely; Andy Kyle; Armando Marsans; Mike Mitchell	Manager: Hank O'Day; Coaches: Heinie Peitz

== Player stats ==
=== Batting ===
==== Starters by position ====
Note: Pos = Position; G = Games played; AB = At bats; H = Hits; Avg. = Batting average; HR = Home runs; RBI = Runs batted in

Pos	Player	G	AB	H	Avg.	HR	RBI
C	Larry McLean	102	333	81	.243	1	27
1B	Dick Hoblitzell	148	558	164	.294	2	85
2B	Dick Egan	149	507	125	.247	0	52
SS	Jimmy Esmond	82	231	45	.195	1	40
3B	Art Phelan	130	461	112	.243	3	54
OF	Armando Marsans	110	416	132	.317	1	38
OF	Bob Bescher	145	548	154	.281	4	38
OF	Mike Mitchell	147	552	156	.283	4	78

==== Other batters ====
Note: G = Games played; AB = At bats; H = Hits; Avg. = Batting average; HR = Home runs; RBI = Runs batted in

Player	G	AB	H	Avg.	HR	RBI
Eddie Grant	96	255	61	.239	2	20
Johnny Bates	81	239	69	.289	1	29
Tommy Clarke	72	146	41	.281	0	22
Tex McDonald	61	140	36	.257	1	15
Hank Severeid	50	114	27	.237	0	13
Pete Knisely	21	67	22	.328	0	7
Rafael Almeida	16	59	13	.220	0	10
Andy Kyle	9	21	7	.333	0	4
Earl Blackburn	1	0	0	----	0	0

=== Pitching ===
==== Starting pitchers ====
Note: G = Games pitched; IP = Innings pitched; W = Wins; L = Losses; ERA = Earned run average; SO = Strikeouts

Player	G	IP	W	L	ERA	SO
George Suggs	42	303.0	19	16	2.94	104
Rube Benton	50	302.0	18	20	3.10	162
Art Fromme	43	296.0	16	18	2.74	120
Harry Gaspar	7	36.2	1	3	4.17	13
Gene Packard	1	9.0	1	0	3.00	2
Bill Doak	1	2.0	0	0	4.50	0

==== Other pitchers ====
Note: G = Games pitched; IP = Innings pitched; W = Wins; L = Losses; ERA = Earned run average; SO = Strikeouts

Player	G	IP	W	L	ERA	SO
Bert Humphries	30	158.2	9	11	3.23	58
Bobby Keefe	17	68.2	1	3	5.24	29
Frank Harter	6	29.1	1	2	3.07	12
Frank Smith	7	22.2	1	1	6.35	5
Jim Bagby	5	17.1	2	1	3.12	10
Frank Gregory	4	15.2	2	0	4.60	4
John Frill	3	15.0	1	0	6.00	4
Gene Moore	5	14.2	0	1	4.91	6
Ralph Works	3	9.2	1	1	2.79	5

==== Relief pitchers ====
Note: G = Games pitched; W = Wins; L = Losses; SV = Saves; ERA = Earned run average; SO = Strikeouts

Player	G	W	L	SV	ERA	SO
Dixie Davis	7	0	1	0	2.70	12
Howard McGraner	4	1	0	0	7.11	5
Sam Fletcher	2	0	0	0	12.10	3
Ben Taylor	2	0	0	0	3.18	2
Hanson Horsey	1	0	0	0	22.50	0
Ed Donalds	1	1	0	0	4.50	1
Chuck Tompkins	1	0	0	0	0.00	1
Bill Prough	1	0	0	0	6.00	1
Bill Cramer	1	0	0	0	0.00	2
