= List of Major League Baseball players (T) =

The following is a list of Major League Baseball players, retired or active. As of the end of the 2011 season, there have been 580 players with a last name that begins with T who have been on a major league roster at some point.

== T ==
For reasons of space, this list has been split into two pages:

- Jeff Tabaka through Sloppy Thurston
- Luis Tiant through Ty Tyson
