= Cincinnati Pippins =

1912 baseball team in Ohio, U.S.

- 1912; Cincinnati, Ohio

Minor league affiliations
- Class: Independent
- League: United States Baseball League

Team data
- Ballpark: Hippodrome Park
- Owner/ Operator: John J. Ryan
- General manager: Hugh McKinnon
- Manager: James Barton

The Cincinnati Pippins, also known as the Cincinnati Cams, were a franchise in the United States Baseball League based in Cincinnati, Ohio, and was owned by New York attorney John J. Ryan. The team and the league lasted just over a month, from May 1 to June 5, 1912. The most games any of the eight team in the league played was 26. The USBL originally planned to have a 126-game season.

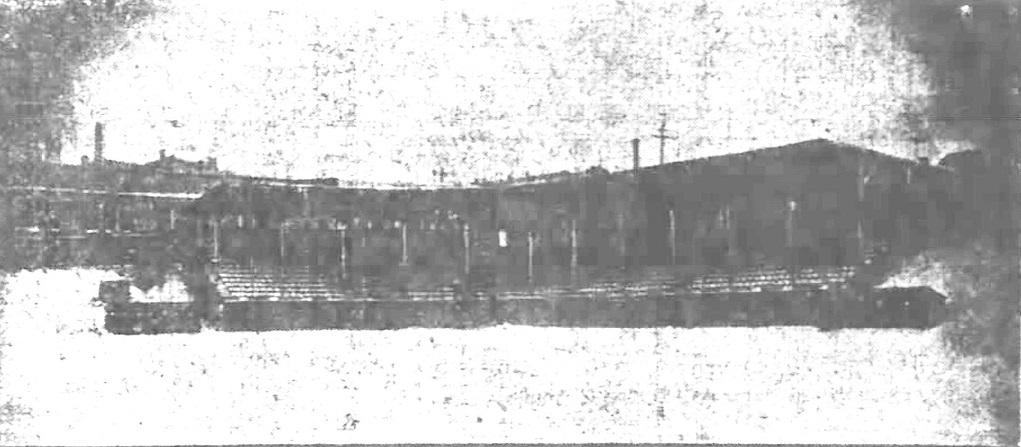
Hippodrome Park

The home field was Hippodrome Park, which was located at Spring Grove Avenue and Queen City Avenue. The ballpark had been built for local semipro clubs in 1911, and that usage would continue for a few years after the USBL failed. By the 1930s, the ballpark had fallen out of use and was demolished. Per Google Maps, Spring Garden Avenue and Queen City Avenue no longer intersect. The former ballpark location is now occupied by industrial buildings.

== 1912 Standings ==
In the only season for the United States Baseball League, the Pippins held a 12–10 record, fourth-best in the league.

Team	Win	Loss	Pct
Pittsburgh Filipinos	19	7	.731
Richmond Rebels	15	11	.577
Reading (no name)	12	9	.571
Cincinnati Pippins	12	10	.545
Washington Senators	6	7	.462
Chicago Green Sox	10	12	.455
Cleveland Forest City	8	13	.381
New York Knickerbockers	2	15	.118

== Notable players ==
- Bugs Raymond
- Ben Taylor
