= Ona Dodd =

American baseball player (1886–1956)

- Third baseman
- Born: October 14, 1886; Springtown, Texas, U.S.
- Died: December 17, 1956 (aged 70); Carter, Oklahoma, U.S.
- Batted: Right Threw: Right

MLB debut
- July 26, 1912, for the Pittsburgh Pirates

Last MLB appearance
- August 3, 1912, for the Pittsburgh Pirates

MLB statistics
- Games played: 5
- At bats: 9
- Hits: 0
- Stats at Baseball Reference

Teams
- Pittsburgh Pirates (1912)

Ona Melvin Dodd (October 14, 1886 – December 17, 1956) was an American third baseman in Major League Baseball. He played seven seasons of minor league baseball, from 1911 to 1918, and appeared in five games for the Pittsburgh Pirates in 1912.
