= Bugs Raymond =

American baseball player (1882–1912)

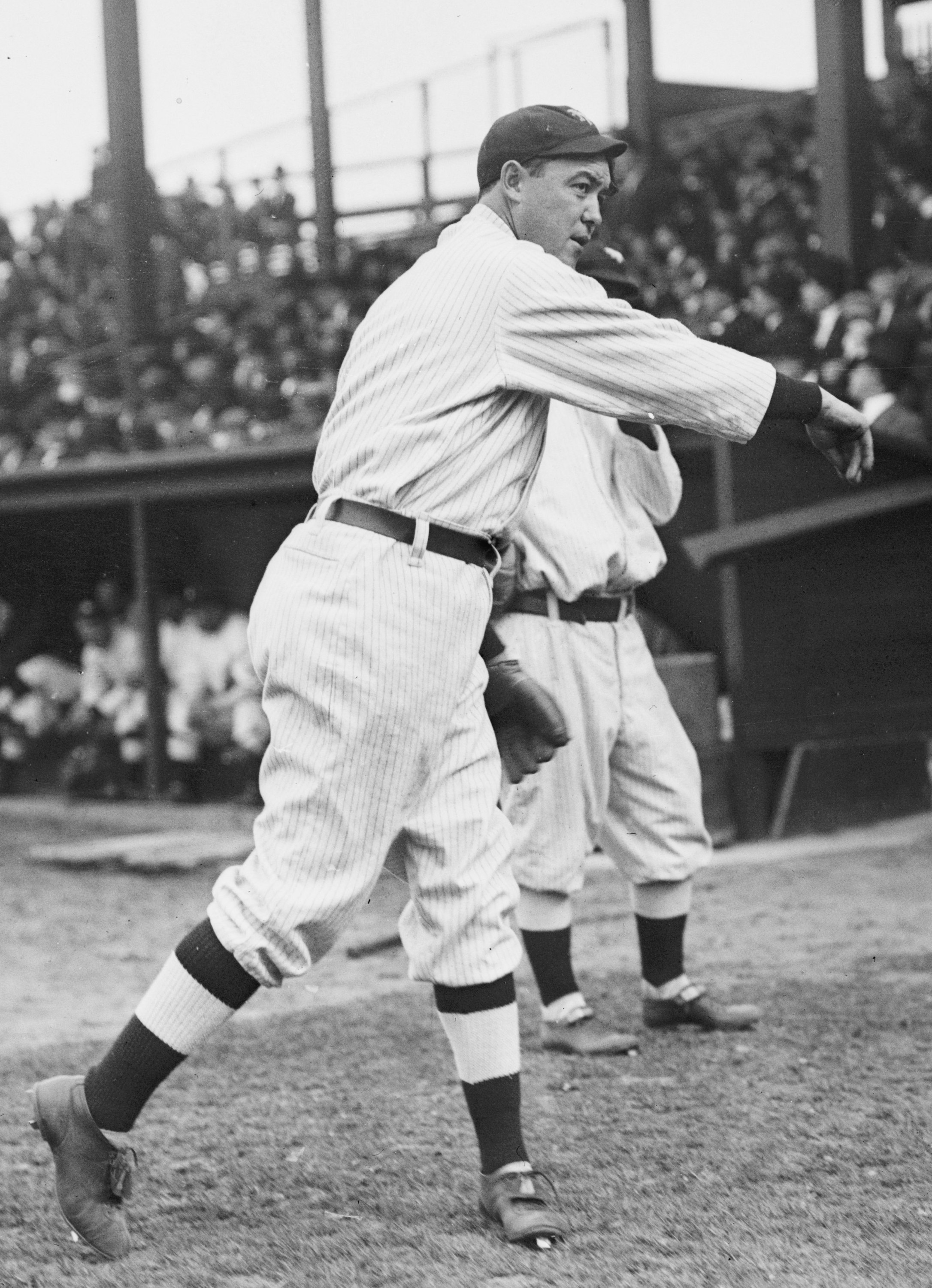
- Raymond in 1911
- Pitcher
- Born: February 24, 1882; Chicago, Illinois, U.S.
- Died: September 7, 1912 (aged 30); Chicago, Illinois, U.S.
- Batted: Right Threw: Right

MLB debut
- September 23, 1904, for the Detroit Tigers

Last MLB appearance
- June 16, 1911, for the New York Giants

MLB statistics
- Win–loss record: 45–57
- Earned run average: 2.49
- Strikeouts: 401
- Stats at Baseball Reference

Teams
- Detroit Tigers (1904); St. Louis Cardinals (1907–1908); New York Giants (1909–1911)

Arthur Lawrence "Bugs" Raymond (February 24, 1882 – September 7, 1912) was an American Major League Baseball pitcher from 1904 to 1911. He played for the Detroit Tigers, St. Louis Cardinals, and New York Giants.

== Biography ==
Raymond was born in Chicago. He started his professional baseball career with the Waterloo Microbes in 1904. After a short stint with the Tigers, Raymond returned to the minors. He developed his spitball sometime in 1906. With the new pitch, he had a big season in 1907, going 35-11 for the South Atlantic League's Charleston Sea Gulls. Raymond pitched a no-hitter that year, as well, and led Charleston to the pennant. The Cardinals purchased him in September, and in 1908, he was the best pitcher on the team. His 2.03 earned run average ranked tenth in the National League, and his 145 strikeouts were fourth-best. During the 1908 season, he gave up fewer hits per game than Christy Mathewson and threw five shutouts, but he was also on the mound eleven times when the Cardinals failed to score.

Raymond was known for his spitball and got his nickname because of his zany antics on the mound. What might have been a promising career was short-circuited by a severe addiction to alcohol. The only manager who could keep Raymond in line for any length of time was hard-nosed Giants manager John McGraw. McGraw picked him up in the Roger Bresnahan trade before the 1909 season, and Bugs won 18 games for him that year.

However, Raymond could never stay sober for long. McGraw tried everything – including fining him so there wouldn't be any money left for drinks and hiring a detective to trail Bugs – but nothing worked. In addition, Raymond had a subpar performance on the mound in 1910, going 4-11. He was released midway through the Giants' 1911 pennant-winning season.

In 1912, after a stint with the Cincinnati Pippins of the short-lived United States League, Raymond got into a number of fights in Chicago and ended up badly beaten. He died of a fractured skull a few weeks later at age 30.
