= List of Major League Baseball players (Ti–Tz) =

The following is a list of Major League Baseball players, retired or active.

== Ti through Ty ==
Name	Debut	Final game	Position	Teams	Ref
Luis Tiant	July 19, 1964	September 4, 1982	Pitcher	Cleveland Indians, Minnesota Twins, Boston Red Sox, New York Yankees, Pittsburgh Pirates, California Angels	
Jay Tibbs	July 15, 1984	July 7, 1990	Pitcher	Cincinnati Reds, Montreal Expos, Baltimore Orioles, Pittsburgh Pirates	
Dick Tidrow	April 18, 1972	May 7, 1984	Pitcher	Cleveland Indians, New York Yankees, Chicago Cubs, Chicago White Sox, New York Mets	
Bobby Tiefenauer	July 14, 1952	September 21, 1968	Pitcher	St. Louis Cardinals, Cleveland Indians, Houston Colt .45s, Milwaukee Braves, New York Yankees, Chicago Cubs	
Verle Tiefenthaler	August 19, 1962	August 31, 1962	Pitcher	Chicago White Sox	
Eddie Tiemeyer	August 19, 1906	October 1, 1909	Utility infielder	Cincinnati Reds, New York Highlanders	
Mike Tiernan	August 30, 1887	July 31, 1899	Outfielder	New York Giants	
Bill Tierney	May 2, 1882	April 24, 1884	Utility player	Cincinnati Red Stockings (AA), Baltimore Monumentals	
Cotton Tierney	September 23, 1920	October 3, 1925	Second baseman	Pittsburgh Pirates, Philadelphia Phillies, Boston Braves, Brooklyn Robins	
Les Tietje	September 18, 1933	September 4, 1938	Pitcher	Chicago White Sox, St. Louis Browns	
Terry Tiffee	September 1, 2004		Third baseman	Minnesota Twins, Los Angeles Dodgers	
Ray Tift	August 7, 1907	September 2, 1907	Pitcher	New York Highlanders	
John Tilley	August 23, 1882	October 13, 1884	Outfielder	Cleveland Blues (NL), Toledo Blue Stockings, St. Paul Saints	
Bob Tillman	April 15, 1962	October 1, 1970	Catcher	Boston Red Sox, New York Yankees, Atlanta Braves	
Chris Tillman	July 29, 2009		Pitcher	Baltimore Orioles	
Johnny Tillman	September 20, 1915	September 22, 1915	Pitcher	St. Louis Browns	
Rusty Tillman	June 6, 1982	June 18, 1988	Outfielder	New York Mets, Oakland Athletics, San Francisco Giants	
Thad Tillotson	April 14, 1967	August 11, 1968	Pitcher	New York Yankees	
Gary Timberlake	June 18, 1969	June 24, 1969	Pitcher	Seattle Pilots	
Mike Timlin	April 8, 1991	September 28, 2008	Pitcher	Toronto Blue Jays, Seattle Mariners, Baltimore Orioles, St. Louis Cardinals, Philadelphia Phillies, Boston Red Sox	
Tom Timmermann	June 18, 1969	April 26, 1974	Pitcher	Detroit Tigers, Cleveland Indians	
Ozzie Timmons	April 26, 1995	October 1, 2000	Outfielder	Chicago Cubs, Cincinnati Reds, Seattle Mariners, Tampa Bay Devil Rays	
Clay Timpner	April 8, 2008		Outfielder	San Francisco Giants	
Ben Tincup	May 22, 1914	September 15, 1928	Pitcher	Philadelphia Phillies, Chicago Cubs	
Ron Tingley	September 25, 1982	September 27, 1995	Catcher	San Diego Padres, Cleveland Indians, California Angels, Florida Marlins, Chicago White Sox, Detroit Tigers	
Joe Tinker β	April 17, 1902	September 22, 1916	Shortstop	Chicago Cubs, Cincinnati Reds, Chicago Chi-Feds/Whales	
Bud Tinning	April 20, 1932	April 27, 1935	Pitcher	Chicago Cubs, St. Louis Cardinals	
Lee Tinsley	April 6, 1993	September 28, 1997	Outfielder	Seattle Mariners, Boston Red Sox, Philadelphia Phillies	
Jim Tipper	April 26, 1872	October 28, 1875	Outfielder	Middletown Mansfields, Hartford Dark Blues, New Haven Elm Citys	
Dan Tipple	September 18, 1915	October 6, 1915	Pitcher	New York Yankees	
Eric Tipton	June 9, 1939	September 29, 1945	Outfielder	Philadelphia Athletics, Cincinnati Reds	
Joe Tipton	May 2, 1948	September 26, 1954	Catcher	Cleveland Indians, Chicago White Sox, Philadelphia Athletics, Washington Senators	
Tom Tischinski	April 11, 1969	August 11, 1971	Catcher	Minnesota Twins	
Jack Tising	April 24, 1936	May 30, 1936	Pitcher	Pittsburgh Pirates	
Ledell Titcomb	May 5, 1886	October 15, 1890	Pitcher	Philadelphia Quakers, Philadelphia Athletics (AA), New York Giants, Rochester Broncos	
John Titus	June 6, 1903	August 8, 1913	Outfielder	Philadelphia Phillies, Boston Braves	
Dave Tobik	August 26, 1978	October 5, 1985	Pitcher	Detroit Tigers, Texas Rangers, Seattle Mariners	
Bill Tobin	July 21, 1880	September 27, 1880	First baseman	Worcester Ruby Legs, Troy Trojans	
Jack Tobin	April 16, 1914	September 28, 1927	Outfielder	St. Louis Terriers, St. Louis Browns, Washington Senators, Boston Red Sox	
Jim Tobin	April 30, 1937	September 23, 1945	Pitcher	Pittsburgh Pirates, Boston Braves, Detroit Tigers	
Johnny Tobin	April 20, 1945	September 30, 1945	Third baseman	Boston Red Sox	
Mason Tobin	April 2, 2011		Pitcher	Texas Rangers	
Pat Tobin	August 21, 1941	August 21, 1941	Pitcher	Philadelphia Athletics	
Tip Tobin	September 22, 1932	September 22, 1932	Pinch hitter	New York Giants	
Jorge Toca	September 12, 1999	October 7, 2001	First baseman	New York Mets	
Al Todd	April 25, 1932	August 24, 1943	Catcher	Philadelphia Phillies, Pittsburgh Pirates, Brooklyn Dodgers, Chicago Cubs	
Frank Todd	July 14, 1898	August 4, 1898	Pitcher	Louisville Colonels	
Jackson Todd	May 5, 1977	October 4, 1981	Pitcher	New York Mets, Toronto Blue Jays	
Jess Todd	June 5, 2009		Pitcher	St. Louis Cardinals, Cleveland Indians	
Jim Todd	April 29, 1974	September 28, 1979	Pitcher	Chicago Cubs, Oakland Athletics, Seattle Mariners	
Phil Todt	April 25, 1924	September 25, 1931	First baseman	Boston Red Sox, Philadelphia Athletics	
Hal Toenes	September 17, 1947	September 27, 1947	Pitcher	Washington Senators	
Bobby Tolan	September 3, 1965	September 19, 1979	Outfielder	St. Louis Cardinals, Cincinnati Reds, San Diego Padres, Philadelphia Phillies, Pittsburgh Pirates	
Kevin Tolar	September 11, 2000	May 4, 2003	Pitcher	Detroit Tigers, Boston Red Sox	
Matt Tolbert	April 1, 2008		Utility infielder	Minnesota Twins	
José Tolentino	July 28, 1991	October 6, 1991	First baseman	Houston Astros	
Freddie Toliver	September 15, 1984	July 4, 1993	Pitcher	Cincinnati Reds, Philadelphia Phillies, Minnesota Twins, San Diego Padres, Pittsburgh Pirates	
Brian Tollberg	June 20, 2000	June 10, 2003	Pitcher	San Diego Padres	
Steve Tolleson	April 28, 2010		Shortstop	Oakland Athletics	
Wayne Tolleson	September 1, 1981	September 30, 1990	Utility infielder	Texas Rangers, Chicago White Sox, New York Yankees	
Tim Tolman	September 9, 1981	August 16, 1987	Outfielder	Houston Astros, Detroit Tigers	
Chick Tolson	July 3, 1925	August 16, 1930	First baseman	Cleveland Indians, Chicago Cubs	
Dick Tomanek	September 25, 1953	September 26, 1959	Pitcher	Cleveland Indians, Kansas City Athletics	
Andy Tomasic	April 28, 1949	September 22, 1949	Pitcher	New York Giants	
Andy Tomberlin	August 12, 1993	June 21, 1998	Outfielder	Pittsburgh Pirates, Boston Red Sox, Oakland Athletics, New York Mets, Detroit Tigers	
George Tomer	September 17, 1913	September 17, 1913	Pinch hitter	St. Louis Browns	
Brett Tomko	May 27, 1997		Pitcher	Cincinnati Reds, Seattle Mariners, San Diego Padres, St. Louis Cardinals, San Francisco Giants, Los Angeles Dodgers, Kansas City Royals, New York Yankees, Oakland Athletics, Texas Rangers	
Dave Tomlin	September 2, 1972	August 19, 1986	Pitcher	Cincinnati Reds, San Diego Padres, Montreal Expos, Pittsburgh Pirates	
Josh Tomlin	July 27, 2010		Pitcher	Cleveland Indians	
Randy Tomlin	August 6, 1990	May 20, 1994	Pitcher	Pittsburgh Pirates	
Phil Tomney	September 7, 1888	October 14, 1890	Shortstop	Louisville Colonels	
Chuck Tompkins	June 25, 1912	June 25, 1912	Pitcher	Cincinnati Reds	
Ron Tompkins	September 9, 1965	September 29, 1971	Pitcher	Kansas City Athletics, Chicago Cubs	
Tommy Toms	May 4, 1975	July 2, 1977	Pitcher	San Francisco Giants	
Fred Toney	August 15, 1911	September 29, 1923	Pitcher	Chicago Cubs, Cincinnati Reds, New York Giants, St. Louis Cardinals	
Mike Tonis	June 20, 2004	June 24, 2004	Catcher	Kansas City Royals	
Doc Tonkin	August 19, 1907	August 19, 1907	Pitcher	Washington Senators	
Tony Tonneman	September 19, 1911	September 22, 1911	Catcher	Boston Red Sox	
Steve Toole	August 20, 1886	August 9, 1890	Pitcher	Brooklyn Grays, Kansas City Cowboys (AA), Brooklyn Gladiators	
Bert Tooley	April 12, 1911	August 9, 1912	Shortstop	Brooklyn Dodgers	
Specs Toporcer	April 13, 1921	May 25, 1928	Shortstop	St. Louis Cardinals	
Rupe Toppin	July 28, 1962	August 1, 1962	Pitcher	Kansas City Athletics	
Jeff Torborg	May 10, 1964	September 29, 1973	Catcher	Los Angeles Dodgers, California Angels	
Tony Torcato	July 26, 2002	April 21, 2005	Outfielder	San Francisco Giants	
Wyatt Toregas	August 1, 2009		Catcher	Cleveland Indians, Pittsburgh Pirates	
Earl Torgeson	April 15, 1947	August 23, 1961	First baseman	Boston Braves, Philadelphia Phillies, Detroit Tigers, Chicago White Sox, New York Yankees	
Red Torkelson	August 29, 1917	September 29, 1917	Pitcher	Cleveland Indians	
Red Torphy	September 25, 1920	October 3, 1920	First baseman	Boston Braves	
Frank Torre	April 20, 1956	September 29, 1963	First baseman	Milwaukee Braves, Philadelphia Phillies	
Joe Torre	September 25, 1960	June 17, 1977	Utility player	Milwaukee/Atlanta Braves, St. Louis Cardinals, New York Mets	
Pablo Torrealba	April 9, 1975	April 12, 1979	Pitcher	Atlanta Braves, Oakland Athletics, Chicago White Sox	
Steve Torrealba	October 6, 2001	September 29, 2002	Catcher	Atlanta Braves	
Yorvit Torrealba	September 5, 2001		Catcher	San Francisco Giants, Seattle Mariners, Colorado Rockies, San Diego Padres, Texas Rangers	
Alexander Torres	July 18, 2011		Pitcher	Tampa Bay Rays	
Andrés Torres	April 7, 2002		Outfielder	Detroit Tigers, Texas Rangers, San Francisco Giants	
Ángel Torres	September 12, 1977	October 2, 1977	Pitcher	Cincinnati Reds	
Carlos Torres	July 22, 2009		Pitcher	Chicago White Sox	
Dilson Torres	April 29, 1995	September 27, 1995	Pitcher	Kansas City Royals	
Eider Torres	April 26, 2008		Shortstop	Baltimore Orioles	
Félix Torres	April 10, 1962	October 3, 1964	Third baseman	Los Angeles Angels	
Gil Torres	April 25, 1940	September 14, 1946	Utility infielder	Washington Senators	
Héctor Torres	April 10, 1968	October 2, 1977	Shortstop	Houston Astros, Chicago Cubs, Montreal Expos, San Diego Padres, Toronto Blue Jays	
Ricardo Torres	May 18, 1920	August 15, 1922	Utility player	Washington Senators	
Rusty Torres	September 20, 1971	August 25, 1980	Outfielder	New York Yankees, Cleveland Indians, California Angels, Chicago White Sox, Kansas City Royals	
Salomón Torres	August 29, 1993	September 27, 2008	Pitcher	San Francisco Giants, Seattle Mariners, Montreal Expos, Pittsburgh Pirates, Milwaukee Brewers	
Mike Torrez	September 10, 1967	July 27, 1984	Pitcher	St. Louis Cardinals, Montreal Expos, Baltimore Orioles, Oakland Athletics, New York Yankees, Boston Red Sox, New York Mets	
Kelvin Torve	June 25, 1988	July 24, 1991	First baseman	Minnesota Twins, New York Mets	
Rene Tosoni	April 28, 2011		Outfielder	Minnesota Twins	
Lou Tost	April 20, 1942	April 24, 1947	Pitcher	Boston Braves, Pittsburgh Pirates	
Paul Toth	April 22, 1962	May 24, 1964	Pitcher	St. Louis Cardinals, Chicago Cubs	
Clay Touchstone	September 4, 1928	September 8, 1945	Pitcher	Boston Braves, Chicago White Sox	
César Tovar	April 12, 1965	September 29, 1976	Outfielder	Minnesota Twins, Philadelphia Phillies, Texas Rangers, Oakland Athletics, New York Yankees	
Josh Towers	May 2, 2001		Pitcher	Baltimore Orioles, Toronto Blue Jays, New York Yankees	
J. R. Towles	September 5, 2007		Catcher	Houston Astros	
Babe Towne	August 1, 1906	October 6, 1906	Catcher	Chicago White Sox	
George Townsend	June 25, 1887	October 6, 1891	Catcher	Philadelphia Athletics (AA), Baltimore Orioles (19th century)	
Happy Townsend	April 19, 1901	September 21, 1906	Pitcher	Philadelphia Phillies, Washington Senators, Cleveland Naps	
Ira Townsend	August 25, 1920	September 28, 1921	Pitcher	Boston Braves	
Leo Townsend	September 8, 1920	May 27, 1921	Pitcher	Boston Braves	
Jim Toy	April 20, 1887	July 30, 1890	First baseman	Cleveland Blues, Brooklyn Gladiators	
Bill Tozer	April 16, 1908	May 10, 1908	Pitcher	Cincinnati Reds	
Billy Traber	April 4, 2003		Pitcher	Cleveland Indians, Washington Nationals, New York Yankees, Boston Red Sox	
Jim Traber	September 21, 1984	October 1, 1989	First baseman	Baltimore Orioles	
Dick Tracewski	April 12, 1962	September 27, 1969	Utility infielder	Detroit Tigers, Los Angeles Dodgers	
Sean Tracey	June 8, 2006	September 26, 2006	Pitcher	Chicago White Sox	
Steve Trachsel	September 19, 1993	June 7, 2008	Pitcher	Chicago Cubs, Tampa Bay Devil Rays, Toronto Blue Jays, New York Mets, Baltimore Orioles	
Andy Tracy	April 25, 2000		Third baseman	Montreal Expos, Colorado Rockies, Philadelphia Phillies	
Chad Tracy	April 21, 2004		Third baseman	Arizona Diamondbacks, Chicago Cubs, Florida Marlins	
Jim Tracy	July 20, 1980	September 30, 1981	Outfielder	Chicago Cubs	
Bill Traffley	July 27, 1878	July 29, 1886	Catcher	Chicago White Stockings, Cincinnati Red Stockings (AA), Baltimore Orioles (19th century)	
John Traffley	June 15, 1889	June 15, 1889	Outfielder	Louisville Colonels	
Walt Tragesser	July 30, 1913	October 2, 1920	Catcher	Boston Braves, Philadelphia Phillies	
Red Tramback	September 15, 1940	September 16, 1940	Outfielder	New York Giants	
Alan Trammell	September 9, 1977	September 29, 1996	Shortstop	Detroit Tigers	
Bubba Trammell	April 1, 1997	June 22, 2003	Outfielder	Detroit Tigers, Tampa Bay Devil Rays, New York Mets, San Diego Padres, New York Yankees	
Fred Trautman	April 27, 1915	April 27, 1915	Pitcher	Newark Peppers	
John Trautwein	April 7, 1988	August 16, 1988	Pitcher	Boston Red Sox	
Allan Travers	May 18, 1912	May 18, 1912	Pitcher	Detroit Tigers	
Bill Travers	May 19, 1974	July 17, 1983	Pitcher	Milwaukee Brewers, California Angels	
Cecil Travis	May 16, 1933	September 23, 1947	Shortstop	Washington Senators	
Brian Traxler	April 24, 1990	May 21, 1990	First baseman	Los Angeles Dodgers	
Jim Tray	September 6, 1884	September 21, 1884	Catcher	Indianapolis Hoosiers (AA)	
Pie Traynor β	September 15, 1920	August 14, 1937	Third baseman	Pittsburgh Pirates	
Fred Treacey	May 16, 1871	September 16, 1876	Outfielder	Chicago White Stockings, Philadelphia Athletics (1860–76), Philadelphia Centennials, New York Mutuals	
Pete Treacey	August 5, 1876	August 7, 1876	Shortstop	New York Mutuals	
Ray Treadaway	September 17, 1930	September 26, 1930	Third baseman	Washington Senators	
George Treadway	April 27, 1893	June 21, 1896	Outfielder	Baltimore Orioles (19th century), Brooklyn Grooms, Louisville Colonels	
Jeff Treadway	September 4, 1987	September 12, 1995	Second baseman	Cincinnati Reds, Atlanta Braves, Cleveland Indians, Los Angeles Dodgers, Montreal Expos	
Red Treadway	July 25, 1944	September 23, 1945	Outfielder	New York Giants	
Matt Treanor	June 2, 2004		Catcher	Florida Marlins, Detroit Tigers, Texas Rangers, Kansas City Royals	
Frank Trechock	September 19, 1937	September 19, 1937	Shortstop	Washington Senators	
Harry Trekell	August 16, 1913	September 22, 1913	Pitcher	St. Louis Cardinals	
Nick Tremark	August 9, 1934	September 26, 1936	Outfielder	Brooklyn Dodgers	
Bill Tremel	July 12, 1954	April 27, 1956	Pitcher	Chicago Cubs	
Chris Tremie	July 1, 1995	September 21, 2004	Catcher	Chicago White Sox, Texas Rangers, Pittsburgh Pirates, Houston Astros	
Overton Tremper	June 16, 1927	September 30, 1928	Outfielder	Brooklyn Robins	
George Trenwith	April 21, 1875	October 28, 1975	Third baseman	Philadelphia Centennials, New Haven Elm Citys	
Mike Tresh	September 4, 1938	September 25, 1949	Catcher	Chicago White Sox, Cleveland Indians	
Tom Tresh	September 3, 1961	September 29, 1969	Outfielder	New York Yankees, Detroit Tigers	
Alex Treviño	September 11, 1978	September 30, 1990	Catcher	Cincinnati Reds, New York Mets, Atlanta Braves, San Francisco Giants, Los Angeles Dodgers, Houston Astros	
Bobby Treviño	May 22, 1968	July 6, 1968	Outfielder	California Angels	
Gus Triandos	August 13, 1953	August 15, 1965	Catcher	New York Yankees, Baltimore Orioles, Detroit Tigers, Philadelphia Phillies, Houston Astros	
Bob Trice	September 13, 1953	May 2, 1955	Pitcher	Philadelphia/Kansas City Athletics	
Manny Trillo	June 28, 1973	May 20, 1989	Second baseman	Oakland Athletics, Chicago Cubs, Philadelphia Phillies, Cleveland Indians, Montreal Expos, San Francisco Giants, Cincinnati Reds	
Joe Trimble	April 29, 1955	July 14, 1957	Pitcher	Boston Red Sox, Pittsburgh Pirates	
Ken Trinkle	April 25, 1943	October 2, 1949	Pitcher	New York Giants, Philadelphia Phillies	
Coaker Triplett	April 19, 1938	September 30, 1945	Outfielder	Chicago Cubs, St. Louis Cardinals, Philadelphia Phillies	
Ricky Trlicek	April 8, 1992	June 11, 1997	Pitcher	Toronto Blue Jays, Los Angeles Dodgers, Boston Red Sox, New York Mets	
Rich Troedson	April 9, 1973	May 16, 1974	Pitcher	San Diego Padres	
Mike Trombley	August 19, 1992	May 27, 2002	Pitcher	Minnesota Twins, Baltimore Orioles, Los Angeles Dodgers	
Ramón Troncoso	April 1, 2008		Pitcher	Los Angeles Dodgers	
Hal Trosky	September 11, 1933	September 27, 1946	First baseman	Cleveland Indians, Chicago White Sox	
Hal Trosky Jr.	September 25, 1958	September 28, 1958	Pitcher	Chicago White Sox	
Mike Trost	August 21, 1890	September 29, 1895	Catcher	St. Louis Browns (1882–1900), Louisville Colonels	
Sam Trott	May 29, 1880	July 28, 1888	Catcher	Boston Red Caps, Detroit Wolverines, Baltimore Orioles (19th century)	
Bill Trotter	April 23, 1937	September 22, 1944	Pitcher	St. Louis Browns, Washington Senators, St. Louis Cardinals	
Quincy Trouppe	April 30, 1952	May 10, 1952	Catcher	Cleveland Indians	
Dizzy Trout	April 25, 1939	September 11, 1957	Pitcher	Detroit Tigers, Boston Red Sox, Baltimore Orioles	
Mike Trout	July 8, 2011		Outfielder	Los Angeles Angels of Anaheim	
Steve Trout	July 1, 1978	June 5, 1989	Pitcher	Chicago White Sox, Chicago Cubs, New York Yankees, Seattle Mariners	
Bob Trowbridge	April 22, 1956	July 24, 1960	Pitcher	Milwaukee Braves, Kansas City Athletics	
Bun Troy	September 15, 1912	September 15, 1912	Pitcher	Detroit Tigers	
Dasher Troy	August 23, 1881	July 9, 1885	Second baseman	Detroit Wolverines, Providence Grays, New York Gothams, New York Metropolitans	
Fred Truax	August 18, 1890	August 18, 1890	Outfielder	Pittsburgh Pirates	
Chris Truby	June 16, 2000	May 7, 2003	Third baseman	Houston Astros, Montreal Expos, Detroit Tigers, Tampa Bay Devil Rays	
Harry Truby	August 21, 1895	July 14, 1896	Second baseman	Chicago Cubs, Pittsburgh Pirates	
Virgil Trucks	September 27, 1941	September 26, 1958	Pitcher	Detroit Tigers, St. Louis Browns, Chicago White Sox, Kansas City Athletics, New York Yankees	
Frank Truesdale	April 27, 1910	July 30, 1918	Second baseman	St. Louis Browns, New York Yankees, Boston Red Sox	
J. J. Trujillo	June 11, 2002	June 20, 2002	Pitcher	San Diego Padres	
Mike Trujillo	April 14, 1985	June 17, 1989	Pitcher	Boston Red Sox, Seattle Mariners, Detroit Tigers	
Mark Trumbo	September 11, 2010		First baseman	Los Angeles Angels of Anaheim	
Ed Trumbull	May 10, 1884	July 28, 1884	Pitcher	Washington Nationals (AA)	
George Tsamis	April 26, 1993	October 1, 1993	Pitcher	Minnesota Twins	
Chin-hui Tsao	July 25, 2003	July 14, 2007	Pitcher	Colorado Rockies, Los Angeles Dodgers	
John Tsitouris	June 13, 1957	April 24, 1968	Pitcher	Detroit Tigers, Kansas City Athletics, Cincinnati Reds	
Greg Tubbs	August 1, 1993	October 3, 1993	Outfielder	Cincinnati Reds	
Eddie Tucker	June 14, 1992	June 24, 1995	Catcher	Houston Astros, Cleveland Indians	
Michael Tucker	April 26, 1995	October 1, 2006	Outfielder	Kansas City Royals, Atlanta Braves, Cincinnati Reds, Chicago Cubs, San Francisco Giants, Philadelphia Phillies, New York Mets	
Ollie Tucker	April 17, 1927	September 30, 1928	Outfielder	Washington Senators, Cleveland Indians	
Ryan Tucker	June 8, 2008		Pitcher	Florida Marlins, Texas Rangers	
T. J. Tucker	June 3, 2000	June 17, 2005	Pitcher	Montreal Expos, Washington Nationals	
Thurman Tucker	April 14, 1942	April 29, 1951	Outfielder	Chicago White Sox, Cleveland Indians	
Tommy Tucker	April 16, 1887	September 13, 1899	First baseman	Baltimore Orioles (19th century), Boston Beaneaters, Washington Senators (1891–99), Brooklyn Bridegrooms, St. Louis Browns (1882–1900), Cleveland Spiders	
Tom Tuckey	August 11, 1908	August 9, 1909	Pitcher	Boston Doves	
John Tudor	August 16, 1979	September 13, 1990	Pitcher	Boston Red Sox, Pittsburgh Pirates, St. Louis Cardinals, Los Angeles Dodgers	
Oscar Tuero	May 30, 1918	April 19, 1920	Pitcher	St. Louis Cardinals	
Bob Tufts	August 10, 1981	May 6, 1983	Pitcher	San Francisco Giants, Kansas City Royals	
Matt Tuiasosopo	September 5, 2008		Third baseman	Seattle Mariners	
Troy Tulowitzki	August 30, 2006		Shortstop	Colorado Rockies	
Lee Tunnell	September 4, 1982	June 22, 1989	Pitcher	Pittsburgh Pirates, St. Louis Cardinals, Minnesota Twins	
Matt Tupman	May 18, 2008		Catcher	Kansas City Royals	
Brian Turang	August 13, 1993	July 23, 1994	Outfielder	Seattle Mariners	
George Turbeville	July 20, 1935	September 29, 1937	Pitcher	Philadelphia Athletics	
Jerry Turbidy	July 27, 1884	August 13, 1884	Shortstop	Kansas City Cowboys (UA)	
Eddie Turchin	May 9, 1943	May 31, 1943	Third baseman	Cleveland Indians	
Pete Turgeon	September 20, 1923	October 7, 1923	Shortstop	Chicago Cubs	
Lucas Turk	June 7, 1922	September 29, 1922	Pitcher	Washington Senators	
Bob Turley	September 29, 1951	September 21, 1963	Pitcher	St. Louis Browns, Baltimore Orioles, New York Yankees, Los Angeles Angels, Boston Red Sox	
Derrick Turnbow	April 17, 2000		Pitcher	Anaheim Angels, Milwaukee Brewers	
Chris Turner	August 27, 1993	October 1, 2000	Catcher	California/Anaheim Angels, Kansas City Royals, Cleveland Indians, New York Yankees	
Earl Turner	September 25, 1948	July 19, 1950	Catcher	Pittsburgh Pirates	
Jacob Turner	July 30, 2011		Pitcher	Detroit Tigers	
Jerry Turner	September 2, 1974	June 17, 1983	Outfielder	San Diego Padres, Chicago White Sox, Detroit Tigers	
Jim Turner	April 30, 1937	September 13, 1945	Pitcher	Boston Braves, Cincinnati Reds, New York Yankees	
Justin Turner	September 8, 2009		Third baseman	Baltimore Orioles, New York Mets	
Ken Turner	June 11, 1967	July 16, 1967	Pitcher	California Angels	
Matt Turner	April 23, 1993	April 30, 1994	Pitcher	Florida Marlins, Cleveland Indians	
Shane Turner	August 19, 1988	September 29, 1992	Third baseman	Philadelphia Phillies, Baltimore Orioles, Seattle Mariners	
Ted Turner	April 20, 1920	April 20, 1920	Pitcher	Chicago Cubs	
Terry Turner	August 25, 1901	September 29, 1919	Utility infielder	Pittsburgh Pirates, Cleveland Naps/Indians, Philadelphia Athletics	
Tink Turner	September 24, 1915	September 24, 1915	Pitcher	Philadelphia Athletics	
Tom Turner	April 25, 1940	September 8, 1944	Catcher	Chicago White Sox, St. Louis Browns	
Tuck Turner	August 18, 1893	June 10, 1898	Outfielder	Philadelphia Phillies, St. Louis Cardinals	
Bill Tuttle	September 10, 1952	May 11, 1963	Outfielder	Detroit Tigers, Kansas City Athletics, Minnesota Twins	
Elmer Tutwiler	August 20, 1928	September 27, 1928	Pitcher	Pittsburgh Pirates	
Guy Tutwiler	August 29, 1911	September 6, 1913	First baseman	Detroit Tigers	
Art Twineham	September 11, 1893	September 30, 1894	Catcher	St. Louis Cardinals	
Twink Twining	July 9, 1916	July 9, 1916	Pitcher	Cincinnati Reds	
Larry Twitchell	April 30, 1886	July 7, 1894	Outfielder	Detroit Wolverines, Cleveland Spiders, Cleveland Infants, Buffalo Bisons (PL), Columbus Solons, Washington Senators (1891–99), Louisville Colonels	
Wayne Twitchell	September 7, 1970	September 27, 1979	Pitcher	Milwaukee Brewers, Philadelphia Phillies, Montreal Expos, New York Mets, Seattle Mariners	
Jeff Twitty	July 5, 1980	September 23, 1980	Pitcher	Kansas City Royals	
Babe Twombly	April 14, 1920	October 2, 1921	Outfielder	Chicago Cubs	
Cy Twombly	June 25, 1921	July 17, 1921	Pitcher	Chicago White Sox	
George Twombly	July 9, 1914	September 1, 1919	Outfielder	Cincinnati Reds, Boston Braves, Washington Senators	
Jim Tyack	April 20, 1943	August 1, 1943	Outfielder	Philadelphia Athletics	
Fred Tyler	October 3, 1914	October 6, 1914	Catcher	Boston Braves	
Johnnie Tyler	September 16, 1934	September 29, 1935	Outfielder	Boston Braves	
Lefty Tyler	September 20, 1910	July 20, 1921	Pitcher	Boston Braves, Chicago Cubs	
Jason Tyner	June 5, 2000	May 12, 2008	Outfielder	New York Mets, Tampa Bay Devil Rays, Minnesota Twins, Cleveland Indians	
Jim Tyng	September 23, 1879	June 13, 1888	Pitcher	Boston Red Caps, Philadelphia Quakers	
Earl Tyree	October 5, 1914	October 5, 1914	Catcher	Chicago Cubs	
Dave Tyriver	August 21, 1962	September 30, 1962	Pitcher	Cleveland Indians	
Jim Tyrone	August 27, 1972	October 2, 1977	Outfielder	Chicago Cubs, Oakland Athletics	
Wayne Tyrone	July 15, 1976	September 26, 1976	Outfielder	Chicago Cubs	
Mike Tyson	September 5, 1972	October 2, 1981	Second baseman	St. Louis Cardinals, Chicago Cubs	
Turkey Tyson	April 23, 1944	April 23, 1944	Pinch hitter	Philadelphia Phillies	
Ty Tyson	April 13, 1926	July 3, 1928	Outfielder	New York Giants, Brooklyn Robins	
