= List of Major League Baseball players (Ta–Th) =

The following is a list of Major League Baseball players, retired or active.

== Ta through Th ==
Name	Debut	Final game	Position	Teams	Ref
Jeff Tabaka	April 19, 1994	October 5, 2001	Pitcher	Pittsburgh Pirates, San Diego Padres, Houston Astros, Cincinnati Reds, St. Louis Cardinals	
José Tábata	June 9, 2010		Outfielder	Pittsburgh Pirates	
Jerry Tabb	September 8, 1976	May 29, 1978	First baseman	Chicago Cubs, Oakland Athletics	
John Taber	April 30, 1890	July 8, 1890	Pitcher	Boston Beaneaters	
Lefty Taber	September 4, 1926	September 30, 1927	Pitcher	Philadelphia Phillies	
Pat Tabler	August 21, 1981	October 4, 1992	First baseman	Chicago Cubs, Cleveland Indians, Kansas City Royals, New York Mets, Toronto Blue Jays	
Greg Tabor	September 10, 1987	October 4, 1987	Second baseman	Texas Rangers	
Jim Tabor	August 2, 1938	September 17, 1947	Third baseman	Boston Red Sox, Philadelphia Phillies	
Jeff Tackett	September 11, 1991	August 2, 1994	Catcher	Baltimore Orioles	
Kazuhito Tadano	April 27, 2004	July 16, 2005	Pitcher	Cleveland Indians	
John Taff	May 11, 1913	June 28, 1913	Pitcher	Philadelphia Athletics	
So Taguchi	June 10, 2002		Outfielder	St. Louis Cardinals, Chicago Cubs	
Doug Taitt	April 10, 1928	May 4, 1932	Outfielder	Boston Red Sox, Chicago White Sox	
Hisanori Takahashi	April 7, 2010		Pitcher	New York Mets, Los Angeles Angels of Anaheim	
Ken Takahashi	May 2, 2009		Pitcher	New York Mets	
Shingo Takatsu	April 9, 2004	October 2, 2005	Pitcher	Chicago White Sox, New York Mets	
Bob Talbot	September 19, 1953	September 26, 1954	Outfielder	Chicago Cubs	
Fred Talbot	September 28, 1963	June 14, 1970	Pitcher	Chicago White Sox, Kansas City Athletics, New York Yankees, Seattle Pilots, Oakland Athletics	
Mitch Talbot	September 15, 2008		Pitcher	Tampa Bay Rays, Cleveland Indians	
Roy Talcott	June 24, 1943	June 24, 1943	Pitcher	Boston Braves	
Brian Tallet	September 16, 2002		Pitcher	Cleveland Indians, Toronto Blue Jays, St. Louis Cardinals	
Tim Talton	July 8, 1966	October 1, 1967	Catcher	Kansas City Athletics	
Jeff Tam	June 30, 1998	July 9, 2003	Pitcher	New York Mets, Cleveland Indians, Oakland Athletics, Toronto Blue Jays	
John Tamargo	September 3, 1976	October 5, 1980	Catcher	St. Louis Cardinals, San Francisco Giants, Montreal Expos	
Vito Tamulis	September 25, 1934	July 25, 1941	Pitcher	New York Yankees, St. Louis Browns, Brooklyn Dodgers, Philadelphia Phillies	
Frank Tanana	September 9, 1973	October 1, 1993	Pitcher	California Angels, Boston Red Sox, Texas Rangers, Detroit Tigers, New York Mets, New York Yankees	
Dennis Tankersley	May 10, 2002	September 4, 2004	Pitcher	San Diego Padres	
Leo Tankersley	July 2, 1925	July 2, 1925	Catcher	Chicago White Sox	
Taylor Tankersley	June 3, 2006		Pitcher	Florida Marlins	
Jesse Tannehill	June 17, 1894	April 12, 1911	Pitcher	Cincinnati Reds, Pittsburgh Pirates, New York Highlanders, Boston Americans/Red Sox, Washington Senators	
Lee Tannehill	April 22, 1903	May 8, 1912	Third baseman	Chicago White Stockings (AL)/White Sox	
Bruce Tanner	June 12, 1985	September 28, 1985	Pitcher	Chicago White Sox	
Chuck Tanner	April 12, 1955	May 8, 1962	Outfielder	Milwaukee Braves, Chicago Cubs, Cleveland Indians, |Los Angeles Angels	
Kevin Tapani	July 4, 1989	September 27, 2001	Pitcher	New York Mets, Minnesota Twins, Los Angeles Dodgers, Chicago White Sox, Chicago Cubs	
Walter Tappan	April 16, 1914	July 15, 1914	Utility infielder	Kansas City Packers	
El Tappe	April 24, 1954	July 17, 1962	Catcher	Chicago Cubs	
Ted Tappe	September 14, 1950	May 1, 1955	Outfielder	Cincinnati Reds, Chicago Cubs	
Tony Tarasco	April 30, 1993	September 1, 2002	Outfielder	Atlanta Braves, Montreal Expos, Baltimore Orioles, Cincinnati Reds, New York Yankees, New York Mets	
Arlie Tarbert	June 18, 1927	May 1, 1928	Outfielder	Boston Red Sox	
Danny Tartabull	September 7, 1984	April 7, 1997	Outfielder	Seattle Mariners, Kansas City Royals, New York Yankees, Oakland Athletics, Chicago White Sox, Philadelphia Phillies	
José Tartabull	April 10, 1962	July 7, 1970	Outfielder	Kansas City Athletics, Boston Red Sox, Oakland Athletics	
La Schelle Tarver	July 12, 1986	October 5, 1986	Outfielder	Boston Red Sox	
Willie Tasby	September 9, 1958	September 2, 1963	Outfielder	Baltimore Orioles, Boston Red Sox, Washington Senators (1961–1971), Cleveland Indians	
Jack Taschner	June 11, 2005		Pitcher	San Francisco Giants, Philadelphia Phillies, Pittsburgh Pirates, Los Angeles Dodgers	
Jordan Tata	April 6, 2006	August 10, 2007	Pitcher	Detroit Tigers	
Al Tate	September 27, 1946	September 29, 1946	Pitcher	Pittsburgh Pirates	
Bennie Tate	April 29, 1924	July 28, 1934	Catcher	Washington Senators, Chicago White Sox, Boston Red Sox, Chicago Cubs	
Hughie Tate	September 21, 1905	September 25, 1905	Outfielder	Washington Senators	
Lee Tate	September 12, 1958	July 3, 1959	Shortstop	St. Louis Cardinals	
Pop Tate	September 26, 1885	October 15, 1890	Catcher	Boston Beaneaters, Baltimore Orioles (19th century)	
Randy Tate	April 14, 1975	September 27, 1975	Pitcher	New York Mets	
Stu Tate	September 20, 1989	September 30, 1989	Pitcher	San Francisco Giants	
Yoshinori Tateyama	May 24, 2011		Pitcher	Texas Rangers	
Fernando Tatís	July 26, 1997	July 4, 2010	Third baseman	Texas Rangers, St. Louis Cardinals, Montreal Expos, Baltimore Orioles, New York Mets	
Fernando Tatís Jr.	March 28, 2019		Outfielder	San Diego Padres	
Ramón Tatís	April 6, 1997	September 27, 1998	Pitcher	Chicago Cubs, Tampa Bay Devil Rays	
Craig Tatum	July 21, 2009		Catcher	Cincinnati Reds, Baltimore Orioles	
Jarvis Tatum	September 7, 1968	October 1, 1970	Outfielder	California Angels	
Jim Tatum	September 18, 1992	June 11, 1998	Utility player	Milwaukee Brewers, Colorado Rockies, Boston Red Sox, San Diego Padres, New York Mets	
Ken Tatum	May 28, 1969	July 1, 1974	Pitcher	California Angels, Boston Red Sox, Chicago White Sox	
Tommy Tatum	August 1, 1941	September 24, 1947	Outfielder	Brooklyn Dodgers, Cincinnati Reds	
Ty Taubenheim	May 20, 2006		Pitcher	Toronto Blue Jays, Pittsburgh Pirates	
Eddie Taubensee	May 18, 1991	October 7, 2001	Catcher	Cleveland Indians, Houston Astros, Cincinnati Reds	
Fred Tauby	September 1, 1935	June 2, 1937	Outfielder	Chicago White Sox, Philadelphia Phillies	
Walt Tauscher	April 19, 1928	May 5, 1931	Pitcher	Pittsburgh Pirates, Washington Senators	
Don Taussig	April 23, 1958	August 11, 1962	Outfielder	San Francisco Giants, St. Louis Cardinals, Houston Astros	
Jesús Tavárez	May 23, 1994	June 15, 1998	Outfielder	Florida Marlins, Boston Red Sox, Baltimore Orioles	
Julián Tavárez	August 7, 1993	July 19, 2009	Pitcher	Cleveland Indians, San Francisco Giants, Colorado Rockies, Chicago Cubs, Florida Marlins, Pittsburgh Pirates, St. Louis Cardinals, Boston Red Sox, Milwaukee Brewers, Atlanta Braves, Washington Nationals	
Jackie Tavener	September 24, 1921	October 6, 1929	Shortstop	Detroit Tigers, Cleveland Indians	
Alex Taveras	September 9, 1976	October 2, 1983	Utility infielder	Houston Astros, Los Angeles Dodgers	
Frank Taveras	September 25, 1971	July 25, 1982	Shortstop	Pittsburgh Pirates, New York Mets, Montreal Expos	
Willy Taveras	September 6, 2004		Outfielder	Houston Astros, Colorado Rockies, Cincinnati Reds, Washington Nationals	
Aaron Taylor	September 9, 2002	October 2, 2004	Pitcher	Seattle Mariners	
Arlas Taylor	September 15, 1921	September 15, 1921	Pitcher	Philadelphia Athletics	
Ben Taylor (P)	June 28, 1912	July 4, 1912	Pitcher	Cincinnati Reds	
Ben Taylor (1B)	July 29, 1951	September 21, 1955	First baseman	St. Louis Browns, Detroit Tigers, Milwaukee Braves	
Bill Taylor	April 14, 1954	May 8, 1958	Outfielder	New York Giants, Detroit Tigers	
Billy Taylor (1880s P)	May 21, 1881	August 16, 1887	Pitcher	Worcester Ruby Legs, Cleveland Blues (NL), Pittsburgh Alleghenys, St. Louis Maroons, Philadelphia Athletics (American Association), Baltimore Orioles (19th century)	
Billy Taylor (3B)	September 19, 1898	October 15, 1898	Third baseman	Louisville Colonels	
Billy Taylor (1990s P)	April 5, 1994	April 8, 2001	Pitcher	Oakland Athletics, New York Mets, Tampa Bay Devil Rays, Pittsburgh Pirates	
Bob Taylor	April 9, 1970	September 26, 1970	Outfielder	San Francisco Giants	
Bruce Taylor	August 5, 1977	May 22, 1979	Pitcher	Detroit Tigers	
Carl Taylor	April 11, 1968	September 29, 1973	Utility player	Pittsburgh Pirates, St. Louis Cardinals, Kansas City Royals	
Chink Taylor	April 18, 1925	May 20, 1925	Outfielder	Chicago Cubs	
Chuck Taylor	May 27, 1969	October 3, 1976	Pitcher	St. Louis Cardinals, New York Mets, Milwaukee Brewers, MOntreal Expos	
Danny Taylor	June 30, 1926	July 10, 1936	Outfielder	Washington Senators, Chicago Cubs, Brooklyn Dodgers	
Dorn Taylor	April 30, 1987	September 30, 1990	Pitcher	Pittsburgh Pirates, Baltimore Orioles	
Dummy Taylor	August 27, 1900	September 29, 1908	Pitcher	New York Giants, Cleveland Bronchos	
Dwight Taylor	April 14, 1986	April 23, 1986	Designated hitter	Kansas City Royals	
Ed Taylor (P)	August 8, 1903	August 8, 1903	Pitcher	St. Louis Cardinals	
Ed Taylor (IF)	April 14, 1926	September 29, 1926	Third baseman	Boston Braves	
Fred Taylor	September 12, 1950	September 27, 1952	First baseman	Washington Senators	
Gary Taylor	September 2, 1969	September 29, 1969	Pitcher	Detroit Tigers	
Graham Taylor	April 26, 2009		Pitcher	Florida Marlins	
Harry Taylor (1890s 1B)	April 18, 1890	September 29, 1893	First baseman	Louisville Colonels, Baltimore Orioles (19th century)	
Harry Taylor (1930s 1B)	April 14, 1932	May 28, 1932	First baseman	Chicago Cubs	
Harry Taylor (1946–52 P)	September 22, 1946	May 4, 1952	Pitcher	Brooklyn Dodgers, Boston Red Sox	
Harry Taylor (1957 P)	September 17, 1957	September 24, 1957	Pitcher	Kansas City Athletics	
Hawk Taylor	June 9, 1957	September 22, 1970	Catcher	Milwaukee Braves, New York Mets, California Angels, Kansas City Royals	
Brewery Jack Taylor	September 16, 1891	September 12, 1899	Pitcher	New York Giants, Philadelphia Phillies, St. Louis Cardinals, Cincinnati Reds	
Jack Taylor	September 25, 1898	September 2, 1907	Pitcher	Chicago Cubs, St. Louis Cardinals	
Joe Taylor	August 26, 1954	July 21, 1959	Outfielder	Philadelphia Athletics, Cincinnati Reds, St. Louis Cardinals, Baltimore Orioles	
Kerry Taylor	April 13, 1993	June 26, 1994	Pitcher	San Diego Padres	
Leo Taylor	May 3, 1923	May 3, 1923	Pinch runner	Chicago White Sox	
Live Oak Taylor	August 21, 1877	July 30, 1884	Outfielder	Hartford Dark Blues, Troy Trojans, Pittsburgh Alleghenys	
Michael Taylor	September 2, 2011		Pitcher	Oakland Athletics	
Pete Taylor	May 2, 1952	May 2, 1952	Pitcher	St. Louis Browns	
Reggie Taylor	September 17, 2000	June 22, 2005	Outfielder	Philadelphia Phillies, Cincinnati Reds, Tampa Bay Devil Rays	
Ron Taylor	April 11, 1962	May 14, 1972	Pitcher	Cleveland Indians, St. Louis Cardinals, Houston Astros, New York Mets, San Diego Padres	
Sammy Taylor	April 27, 1958	August 6, 1963	Catcher	Chicago Cubs, New York Mets, Cincinnati Reds, Cleveland Indians	
Scott Taylor (LHP)	September 17, 1993	October 3, 1993	Pitcher	Boston Red Sox	
Scott Taylor (RHP)	July 28, 1995	August 7, 1995	Pitcher	Texas Rangers	
Terry Taylor	August 19, 1988	September 20, 1988	Pitcher	Seattle Mariners	
Tommy Taylor	July 9, 1924	September 30, 1924	Third baseman	Washington Senators	
Tony Taylor	April 15, 1958	September 29, 1976	Second baseman	Chicago Cubs, Philadelphia Phillies, Detroit Tigers	
Wade Taylor	June 2, 1991	September 26, 1991	Pitcher	New York Yankees	
Wiley Taylor	September 6, 1911	August 5, 1914	Pitcher	Detroit Tigers, Chicago White Sox, St. Louis Browns	
Zachary Taylor	September 10, 1874	October 14, 1874	First baseman	Baltimore Canaries	
Zack Taylor	June 15, 1920	September 24, 1935	Catcher	Brooklyn Robins, Boston Braves, New York Giants, Chicago Cubs, New York Yankees, Brooklyn Dodgers	
Junichi Tazawa	August 7, 2009		Pitcher	Boston Red Sox	
Bud Teachout	May 12, 1930	April 15, 1932	Pitcher	Chicago Cubs, St. Louis Cardinals	
Everett Teaford	May 17, 2011		Pitcher	Kansas City Royals	
Taylor Teagarden	July 18, 2008		Catcher	Texas Rangers	
Mark Teahen	April 4, 2005		Utility player	Kansas City Royals, Chicago White Sox, Toronto Blue Jays	
Birdie Tebbetts	September 16, 1936	September 14, 1952	Catcher	Detroit Tigers, Boston Red Sox, Cleveland Indians	
George Tebeau	April 16, 1887	September 29, 1895	Outfielder	Cincinnati Red Stockings (AA), Toledo Maumees, Washington Senators (1891–99), Cleveland Spiders	
Patsy Tebeau	September 20, 1887	June 12, 1900	Utility infielder	Chicago White Stockings, Cleveland Spiders, Cleveland Infants, St. Louis Perfectos/Cardinals	
Pussy Tebeau	July 22, 1895	July 24, 1895	Outfielder	Cleveland Spiders	
Al Tedrow	September 15, 1914	September 27, 1914	Pitcher	Cleveland Naps	
Dick Teed	July 24, 1953	July 24, 1953	Pinch hitter	Brooklyn Dodgers	
Julio Teherán	May 7, 2011		Pitcher	Atlanta Braves	
Mark Teixeira	April 1, 2003		First baseman	Texas Rangers, Atlanta Braves, Los Angeles Angels of Anaheim, New York Yankees	
Miguel Tejada	August 27, 1997		Shortstop	Oakland Athletics, Baltimore Orioles, Houston Astros, San Diego Padres, San Francisco Giants	
Rubén Tejada	April 7, 2010		Second baseman	New York Mets	
Wilfredo Tejada	September 9, 1986	October 2, 1988	Catcher	Montreal Expos	
Robinson Tejeda	May 10, 2005		Pitcher	Philadelphia Phillies, Texas Rangers, Kansas City Royals	
Michael Tejera	September 8, 1999	June 9, 2005	Pitcher	Florida Marlins, Texas Rangers	
Blake Tekotte	May 25, 2011		Outfielder	San Diego Padres	
Kent Tekulve	May 20, 1974	July 16, 1989	Pitcher	Pittsburgh Pirates, Philadelphia Phillies, Cincinnati Reds	
Amaury Telemaco	May 16, 1997	July 1, 2005	Pitcher	Chicago Cubs, Arizona Diamondbacks, Philadelphia Phillies	
Anthony Telford	August 19, 1990	July 15, 2002	Pitcher	Baltimore Orioles, Montreal Expos, Texas Rangers	
Dave Telgheder	June 12, 1993	June 2, 1998	Pitcher	New York Mets, Oakland Athletics	
Tom Tellmann	June 9, 1979	June 2, 1985	Pitcher	San Diego Padres, Milwaukee Brewers, Oakland Athletics	
Johnny Temple	April 15, 1952	July 14, 1964	Second baseman	Cincinnati Reds, Cleveland Indians, Baltimore Orioles, Houston Astros	
Chuck Templeton	September 9, 1955	June 10, 1956	Pitcher	Brooklyn Dodgers	
Garry Templeton	August 9, 1976	October 5, 1991	Shortstop	St. Louis Cardinals, San Diego Padres, New York Mets	
Gene Tenace	May 29, 1969	September 30, 1983	Utility player	Oakland Athletics, San Diego Padres, St. Louis Cardinals, Pittsburgh Pirates	
John Tener	June 8, 1885	October 4, 1890	Pitcher	Chicago White Stockings, Pittsburgh Burghers	
Jim Tennant	September 28, 1929	September 28, 1929	Pitcher	New York Giants	
Tom Tennant	April 18, 1912	April 21, 1912	Pinch hitter	St. Louis Browns	
Fred Tenney (OF)	April 28, 1884	August 28, 1884	Outfielder	Washington Nationals (UA), Boston Reds, Wilmington Quicksteps	
Fred Tenney (1B)	June 16, 1894	October 7, 1911	First baseman	Boston Beaneaters/Doves, New York Giants, Boston Rustlers	
Frank Tepedino	May 12, 1967	April 29, 1975	First baseman	New York Yankees, Milwaukee Brewers, Atlanta Braves	
Joe Tepsic	July 12, 1946	October 1, 1946	Outfielder	Brooklyn Dodgers	
Bob Terlecki	August 16, 1972	October 1, 1972	Pitcher	Philadelphia Phillies	
Greg Terlecky	June 12, 1975	September 23, 1975	Pitcher	St. Louis Cardinals	
Jeff Terpko	September 21, 1974	June 2, 1977	Pitcher	Texas Rangers, Montreal Expos	
Jerry Terrell	April 14, 1973	October 5, 1980	Utility infielder	Minnesota Twins, Kansas City Royals	
Tom Terrell	October 5, 1886	October 5, 1886	Utility player	Louisville Colonels	
Walt Terrell	September 18, 1982	October 2, 1992	Pitcher	New York Mets, Detroit Tigers, San Diego Padres, New York Yankees, Pittsburgh Pirates	
Luis Terrero	July 10, 2003		Outfielder	Arizona Diamondbacks, Baltimore Orioles, Chicago White Sox	
Adonis Terry	May 1, 1884	April 27, 1897	Pitcher	Brooklyn Atlantics (AA)/Grays/Bridegrooms/Grooms, Baltimore Orioles (19th century), Pittsburgh Pirates, Chicago Colts	
Bill Terry β	September 24, 1923	September 22, 1936	First baseman	New York Giants	
John Terry	September 17, 1902	July 31, 1903	Pitcher	Detroit Tigers, St. Louis Browns	
Ralph Terry	August 6, 1956	April 22, 1967	Pitcher	New York Yankees, Kansas City Athletics, Cleveland Indians, New York Mets	
Scott Terry	April 9, 1986	September 13, 1991	Pitcher	Cincinnati Reds, St. Louis Cardinals	
Wallace Terry	April 26, 1875	May 5, 1875	Utility player	Washington Nationals (NA)	
Yank Terry	August 3, 1940	July 20, 1945	Pitcher	Boston Red Sox	
Zeb Terry	April 12, 1916	October 1, 1922	Utility infielder	Chicago White Sox, Boston Braves, Pittsburgh Pirates, Chicago Cubs	
Dick Terwilliger	August 18, 1932	August 18, 1932	Pitcher	St. Louis Cardinals	
Wayne Terwilliger	August 6, 1949	May 16, 1960	Second baseman	Chicago Cubs, Brooklyn Dodgers, Washington Senators, New York Giants, Kansas City Athletics	
Al Tesch	August 21, 1915	September 3, 1915	Second baseman	Brooklyn Tip-Tops	
Jeff Tesreau	April 12, 1912	June 11, 1918	Pitcher	New York Giants	
Jay Tessmer	August 27, 1998	April 4, 2002	Pitcher	New York Yankees	
Nick Testa	April 23, 1958	April 23, 1958	Catcher	San Francisco Giants	
Dick Tettelbach	September 25, 1955	May 5, 1957	Outfielder	New York Yankees, Washington Senators	
Mickey Tettleton	May 30, 1984	July 2, 1997	Catcher	Oakland Athletics, Baltimore Orioles, Detroit Tigers, Texas Rangers	
Tim Teufel	September 3, 1983	September 28, 1993	Second baseman	Minnesota Twins, New York Mets, San Diego Padres	
Nate Teut	May 4, 2002	June 27, 2002	Pitcher	Florida Marlins	
Bob Tewksbury	April 11, 1986	September 26, 1998	Pitcher	New York Yankees, Chicago Cubs, St. Louis Cardinals, Texas Rangers, San Diego Padres, Minnesota Twins	
Kanekoa Texeira	April 6, 2010		Pitcher	Seattle Mariners, Kansas City Royals	
George Textor	April 19, 1914	June 23, 1915	Catcher	Indianapolis Hoosiers (FL)/Newark Peppers	
Moe Thacker	April 20, 1958	July 14, 1963	Catcher	Chicago Cubs, St. Louis Cardinals	
Al Thake	June 13, 1872	August 28, 1872	Outfielder	Brooklyn Atlantics	
Eric Thames	May 18, 2011		Outfielder	Toronto Blue Jays	
Marcus Thames	June 10, 2002		Outfielder	New York Yankees, Texas Rangers, Detroit Tigers, Los Angeles Dodgers	
Grant Thatcher	September 9, 1903	April 24, 1904	Pitcher	Brooklyn Superbas	
Joe Thatcher	July 26, 2007		Pitcher	San Diego Padres	
Dale Thayer	May 22, 2009		Pitcher	Tampa Bay Rays, New York Mets	
Greg Thayer	April 7, 1978	June 27, 1978	Pitcher	Minnesota Twins	
Jack Theis	July 5, 1920	July 5, 1920	Pitcher	Cincinnati Reds	
Duane Theiss	August 5, 1977	October 1, 1978	Pitcher	Atlanta Braves	
Ron Theobald	April 12, 1971	October 4, 1972	Second baseman	Milwaukee Brewers	
George Theodore	April 14, 1973	October 2, 1974	Outfielder	New York Mets	
Ryan Theriot	September 13, 2005		Shortstop	Chicago Cubs, Los Angeles Dodgers, St. Louis Cardinals	
Jug Thesenga	September 1, 1944	September 25, 1944	Pitcher	Washington Senators	
Tommy Thevenow	September 4, 1924	October 2, 1938	Shortstop	St. Louis Cardinals, Philadelphia Phillies, Pittsburgh Pirates, Cincinnati Reds, Boston Bees	
Bert Thiel	April 17, 1952	April 30, 1952	Pitcher	Boston Braves	
Henry Thielman	April 17, 1902	May 15, 1903	Pitcher	New York Giants, Cincinnati Reds, Brooklyn Superbas	
Jake Thielman	April 23, 1905	August 9, 1908	Pitcher	St. Louis Cardinals, Cleveland Naps, Boston Red Sox	
Dave Thies	April 20, 1963	June 7, 1963	Pitcher	Kansas City Athletics	
Jake Thies	April 24, 1954	April 17, 1955	Pitcher	Pittsburgh Pirates	
Bobby Thigpen	August 6, 1986	April 27, 1994	Pitcher	Chicago White Sox, Philadelphia Phillies, Seattle Mariners	
Curtis Thigpen	June 6, 2007	September 26, 2008	Catcher	Toronto Blue Jays	
J. J. Thobe	September 18, 1995	September 29, 1995	Pitcher	Montreal Expos	
Tom Thobe	September 12, 1995	April 25, 1996	Pitcher	Atlanta Braves	
Dick Thoenen	September 16, 1967	September 16, 1967	Pitcher	Philadelphia Phillies	
Josh Thole	September 3, 2009		Catcher	New York Mets	
Andrés Thomas	September 3, 1985	September 16, 1990	Shortstop	Atlanta Braves	
Bill Thomas	May 1, 1902	September 8, 1902	Outfielder	Philadelphia Phillies	
Blaine Thomas	August 25, 1911	September 5, 1911	Pitcher	Boston Red Sox	
Brad Thomas	May 26, 2001		Pitcher	Minnesota Twins, Detroit Tigers	
Bud Thomas (P)	September 13, 1932	September 27, 1941	Pitcher	Washington Senators, Philadelphia Athletics, Detroit Tigers	
Bud Thomas (SS)	September 2, 1951	September 29, 1951	Shortstop	St. Louis Browns	
Carl Thomas	April 19, 1960	May 14, 1960	Pitcher	Cleveland Indians	
Charles Thomas	June 23, 2004	June 8, 2005	Outfielder	Atlanta Braves, Oakland Athletics	
Claude Thomas	September 14, 1916	October 2, 1916	Pitcher	Washington Senators	
Clete Thomas	March 31, 2008		Outfielder	Detroit Tigers	
Dan Thomas	September 2, 1976	May 18, 1977	Outfielder	Milwaukee Brewers	
Derrel Thomas	September 14, 1971	October 5, 1985	Utility player	Houston Astros, San Diego Padres, San Francisco Giants, Los Angeles Dodgers, California Angels, Montreal Expos, Philadelphia Phillies	
Fay Thomas	June 27, 1927	September 29, 1935	Pitcher	New York Giants, Cleveland Indians, Brooklyn Dodgers, St. Louis Browns	
Frank Thomas (OF)	August 17, 1951	May 30, 1966	Outfielder	Pittsburgh Pirates, Cincinnati Redlegs, Chicago Cubs, Milwaukee Braves, New York Mets, Philadelphia Phillies, Houston Astros	
Frank Thomas (DH)	August 2, 1990	August 29, 2008	Designated hitter	Chicago White Sox, Oakland Athletics, Toronto Blue Jays	
Fred Thomas	April 22, 1918	August 9, 1920	Third baseman	Boston Red Sox, Philadelphia Athletics, Washington Senators	
Frosty Thomas	May 1, 1905	May 6, 1905	Pitcher	Detroit Tigers	
George Thomas	September 11, 1957	September 6, 1971	Outfielder	Detroit Tigers, Los Angeles Angels, Boston Red Sox, Minnesota Twins	
Gorman Thomas	April 6, 1973	October 5, 1986	Outfielder	Milwaukee Brewers, Cleveland Indians, Seattle Mariners	
Herb Thomas	August 28, 1924	September 22, 1927	Utility player	Boston Braves, New York Giants	
Ira Thomas	May 18, 1906	June 18, 1915	Catcher	New York Highlanders, Detroit Tigers, Philadelphia Athletics	
Justin Thomas	September 1, 2008		Pitcher	Seattle Mariners, Pittsburgh Pirates	
Kite Thomas	April 19, 1952	September 27, 1953	Outfielder	Philadelphia Athletics, Washington Senators	
Larry Thomas	August 11, 1995	May 25, 1997	Pitcher	Chicago White Sox	
Lee Thomas	April 22, 1961	September 27, 1968	Utility player	New York Yankees, Los Angeles Angels, Boston Red Sox, Atlanta Braves, Chicago Cubs, Houston Astros	
Lefty Thomas	September 26, 1925	September 26, 1926	Pitcher	Washington Senators	
Leo Thomas	April 29, 1950	July 27, 1952	Third baseman	St. Louis Browns, Chicago White Sox	
Mike Thomas	July 12, 1995	July 12, 1995	Pitcher	Milwaukee Brewers	
Myles Thomas	April 18, 1926	June 21, 1930	Pitcher	New York Yankees, Washington Senators	
Pinch Thomas	April 24, 1912	June 19, 1921	Catcher	Boston Red Sox, Cleveland Indians	
Ray Thomas	July 22, 1938	July 22, 1938	Catcher	Brooklyn Dodgers	
Red Thomas	September 13, 1921	September 28, 1921	Outfielder	Chicago Cubs	
Roy Thomas (OF)	April 14, 1899	September 4, 1911	Outfielder	Philadelphia Phillies, Pittsburgh Pirates, Boston Doves	
Roy Thomas (P)	September 21, 1977	August 4, 1987	Pitcher	Houston Astros, St. Louis Cardinals, Seattle Mariners	
Stan Thomas	July 5, 1974	October 2, 1977	Pitcher	Texas Rangers, Cleveland Indians, Seattle Mariners, New York Yankees	
Tom Thomas	September 20, 1894	June 18, 1900	Pitcher	Cleveland Spiders, St. Louis Perfectos/Cardinals	
Tommy Thomas	April 17, 1926	September 27, 1937	Pitcher	Chicago White Sox, Washington Senators, Philadelphia Phillies, St. Louis Browns, Boston Red Sox	
Valmy Thomas	April 16, 1957	October 1, 1961	Catcher	New York Giants, San Francisco Giants, Philadelphia Phillies, Baltimore Orioles, Cleveland Indians	
Walt Thomas	September 18, 1908	September 19, 1908	Shortstop	Boston Doves	
Art Thomason	August 10, 1910	August 27, 1910	Outfielder	Cleveland Indians	
Erskine Thomason	September 18, 1974	September 18, 1974	Pitcher	Philadelphia Phillies	
Gary Thomasson	September 5, 1972	October 6, 1980	Outfielder	San Francisco Giants, Oakland Athletics, New York Yankees, Los Angeles Dodgers	
Jim Thome	September 4, 1991		First baseman	Cleveland Indians, Philadelphia Phillies, Chicago White Sox, Los Angeles Dodgers, Minnesota Twins	
Aaron Thompson	August 24, 2011		Pitcher	Pittsburgh Pirates	
Andy Thompson	May 2, 2000	May 4, 2000	Outfielder	Toronto Blue Jays	
Art Thompson	June 17, 1884	June 17, 1884	Pitcher	Washington Nationals (UA)	
Bobby Thompson	April 16, 1978	September 25, 1978	Outfielder	Texas Rangers	
Brad Thompson	May 8, 2005		Pitcher	St. Louis Cardinals, Kansas City Royals	
Danny Thompson	June 25, 1970	October 2, 1976	Shortstop	Minnesota Twins, Texas Rangers	
Daryl Thompson	June 21, 2008		Pitcher	Cincinnat Reds	
Derek Thompson	May 28, 2005	June 23, 2005	Pitcher	Los Angeles Dodgers	
Don Thompson	April 24, 1949	June 22, 1954	Outfielder	Boston Braves, Brooklyn Dodgers	
Forrest Thompson	April 26, 1948	June 5, 1949	Pitcher	Washington Senators	
Frank Thompson (C)	April 26, 1875	September 11, 1875	Catcher	Brooklyn Atlantics, Washington Nationals	
Frank Thompson (3B)	May 6, 1920	August 17, 1920	Third baseman	St. Louis Browns	
Fresco Thompson	September 5, 1925	April 22, 1934	Second baseman	Pittsburgh Pirates, New York Giants, Philadelphia Phillies, Brooklyn Dodgers	
Fuller Thompson	August 19, 1911	September 7, 1911	Pitcher	Boston Rustlers	
Gus Thompson	August 31, 1903	September 21, 1906	Pitcher	Pittsburgh Pirates, St. Louis Cardinals	
Hank Thompson	July 17, 1947	September 30, 1956	Third baseman	St. Louis Browns, New York Giants	
Harry Thompson	April 24, 1919	June 28, 1919	Pitcher	Washington Senators, Philadelphia Athletics	
Homer Thompson	October 5, 1912	October 5, 1912	Catcher	New York Yankees	
Jason Thompson (1B born 1954)	April 23, 1976	June 23, 1986	First baseman	Detroit Tigers, California Angels, Pittsburgh Pirates, Montreal Expos	
Jason Thompson (1B born 1971)	June 9, 1996	June 22, 1996	First baseman	San Diego Padres	
Jocko Thompson	September 21, 1948	September 16, 1951	Pitcher	Philadelphia Phillies	
Junior Thompson	April 26, 1939	July 4, 1947	Pitcher	Cincinnati Reds, New York Giants	
Justin Thompson	May 27, 1996	August 25, 2005	Pitcher	Detroit Tigers, Texas Rangers	
Kevin Thompson	June 3, 2006	September 30, 2007	Outfielder	New York Yankees, Oakland Athletics	
Lee Thompson	September 4, 1921	September 23, 1921	Pitcher	Chicago White Sox	
Mark Thompson	July 26, 1994	July 27, 2000	Pitcher	Colorado Rockies, St. Louis Cardinals	
Mike Thompson (1970s P)	May 19, 1971	September 5, 1975	Pitcher	Washington Senators (1961–1971), St. Louis Cardinals, Atlanta Braves	
Mike Thompson (2000s P)	May 17, 2006		Pitcher	San Diego Padres	
Milt Thompson	September 4, 1964	July 28, 1996	Outfielder	Atlanta Braves, Philadelphia Phillies, St. Louis Cardinals, Houston Astros, Los Angeles Dodgers, Colorado Rockies	
Rich Thompson (20th century P)	April 28, 1985	April 22, 1990	Pitcher	Cleveland Indians, Montreal Expos	
Rich Thompson (OF)	April 7, 2004	April 22, 2004	Outfielder	Kansas City Royals	
Rich Thompson (21st century P)	September 1, 2007		Pitcher	Los Angeles Angels of Anaheim	
Robby Thompson	April 8, 1986	September 22, 1996	Second baseman	San Francisco Giants	
Ryan Thompson	September 1, 1992	September 17, 2002	Outfielder	New York Mets, Cleveland Indians, Houston Astros, New York Yankees, Florida Marlins, Milwaukee Brewers	
Sam Thompson β	July 2, 1885	September 10, 1906	Outfielder	Detroit Wolverines, Philadelphia Quakers (NL)/Phillies, Detroit Tigers	
Scot Thompson	September 3, 1978	October 4, 1985	Outfielder	Chicago Cubs, San Francisco Giants, Montreal Expos	
Shag Thompson	June 8, 1914	May 17, 1916	Outfielder	Philadelphia Athletics	
Tim Thompson	April 28, 1954	April 27, 1958	Catcher	Brooklyn Dodgers, Kansas City Athletics, Detroit Tigers	
Tommy Thompson (P)	June 5, 1912	October 5, 1912	Pitcher	New York Yankees	
Tommy Thompson (OF)	September 3, 1933	June 9, 1939	Outfielder	Boston Braves, Chicago White Sox, St. Louis Browns	
Tug Thompson	August 31, 1882	July 4, 1884	Utility player	Cincinnati Red Stockings (AA), Indianapolis Hoosiers (AA)	
Will Thompson	July 9, 1892	July 9, 1892	Pitcher	Pittsburgh Pirates	
Bobby Thomson	September 9, 1946	July 17, 1960	Outfielder	New York Giants, Milwaukee Braves, Chicago Cubs, Boston Red Sox, Baltimore Orioles	
John Thomson	May 11, 1997	July 1, 2007	Pitcher	Colorado Rockies, New York Mets, Texas Rangers, Atlanta Braves, Kansas City Royals	
Dickie Thon	May 22, 1979	October 3, 1993	Shortstop	California Angels, Houston Astros, San Diego Padres, Philadelphia Phillies, Texas Rangers, Milwaukee Brewers	
Jack Thoney	April 26, 1902	August 12, 1911	Outfielder	Cleveland Bronchos/Naps, Baltimore Orioles (1901–02), Washington Senators, New York Highlanders, Boston Red Sox	
Hank Thormahlen	September 29, 1917	May 7, 1925	Pitcher	New York Yankees, Boston Red Sox, Brooklyn Robins	
Scott Thorman	June 18, 2006		First baseman	Atlanta Braves	
Paul Thormodsgard	April 10, 1977	September 8, 1979	Pitcher	Minnesota Twins	
Andre Thornton	July 28, 1973	August 31, 1987	First baseman	Chicago Cubs, Montreal Expos, Cleveland Indians	
John Thornton	August 14, 1889	September 15, 1892	Pitcher	Washington Nationals (1886–1889), Philadelphia Phillies	
Lou Thornton	April 8, 1985	April 24, 1990	Outfielder	Toronto Blue Jays, New York Mets	
Matt Thornton	June 27, 2004		Pitcher	Seattle Mariners, Chicago White Sox	
Otis Thornton	July 6, 1973	July 6, 1973	Catcher	Houston Astros	
Walter Thornton	July 1, 1895	October 8, 1898	Pitcher	Chicago Cubs	
Bob Thorpe (OF)	April 19, 1951	September 27, 1953	Outfielder	Boston/Milwaukee Braves	
Bob Thorpe (P)	April 17, 1955	April 20, 1955	Pitcher	Chicago Cubs	
Jim Thorpe	April 14, 1913	September 25, 1919	Outfielder	New York Giants, Cincinnati Reds, Atlanta Braves	
Buck Thrasher	September 27, 1916	May 16, 1917	Outfielder	Philadelphia Athletics	
Erick Threets	September 12, 2007		Pitcher	San Francisco Giants, Chicago White Sox	
Faye Throneberry	April 15, 1952	July 19, 1961	Outfielder	Boston Red Sox, Washington Senators, Los Angeles Angels	
Marv Throneberry	September 25, 1955	May 5, 1963	First baseman	New York Yankees, Kansas City Athletics, Baltimore Orioles, New York Mets	
George Throop	September 7, 1975	August 21, 1979	Pitcher	Kansas City Royals, Houston Astros	
Lou Thuman	September 8, 1939	September 27, 1940	Pitcher	Washington Senators	
Bob Thurman	April 14, 1955	April 21, 1959	Outfielder	Cincinnati Reds	
Corey Thurman	April 5, 2002	August 13, 2003	Pitcher	Toronto Blue Jays	
Gary Thurman	August 30, 1987	May 26, 1997	Outfielder	Kansas City Royals, Detroit Tigers, Seattle Mariners, New York Mets	
Mike Thurman	September 2, 1997	September 14, 2002	Pitcher	Montreal Expos, New York Yankees	
Mark Thurmond	May 14, 1983	September 2, 1990	Pitcher	San Diego Padres, Detroit Tigers, Baltimore Orioles, San Francisco Giants	
Joe Thurston	September 2, 2002		Second baseman	Los Angeles Dodgers, Philadelphia Phillies, Boston Red Sox, St. Louis Cardinals, Florida Marlins	
Sloppy Thurston	April 19, 1923	October 1, 1933	Pitcher	St. Louis Browns, Chicago White Sox, Washington Senators, Brooklyn Dodgers	
