= Springtown, Texas =

- City
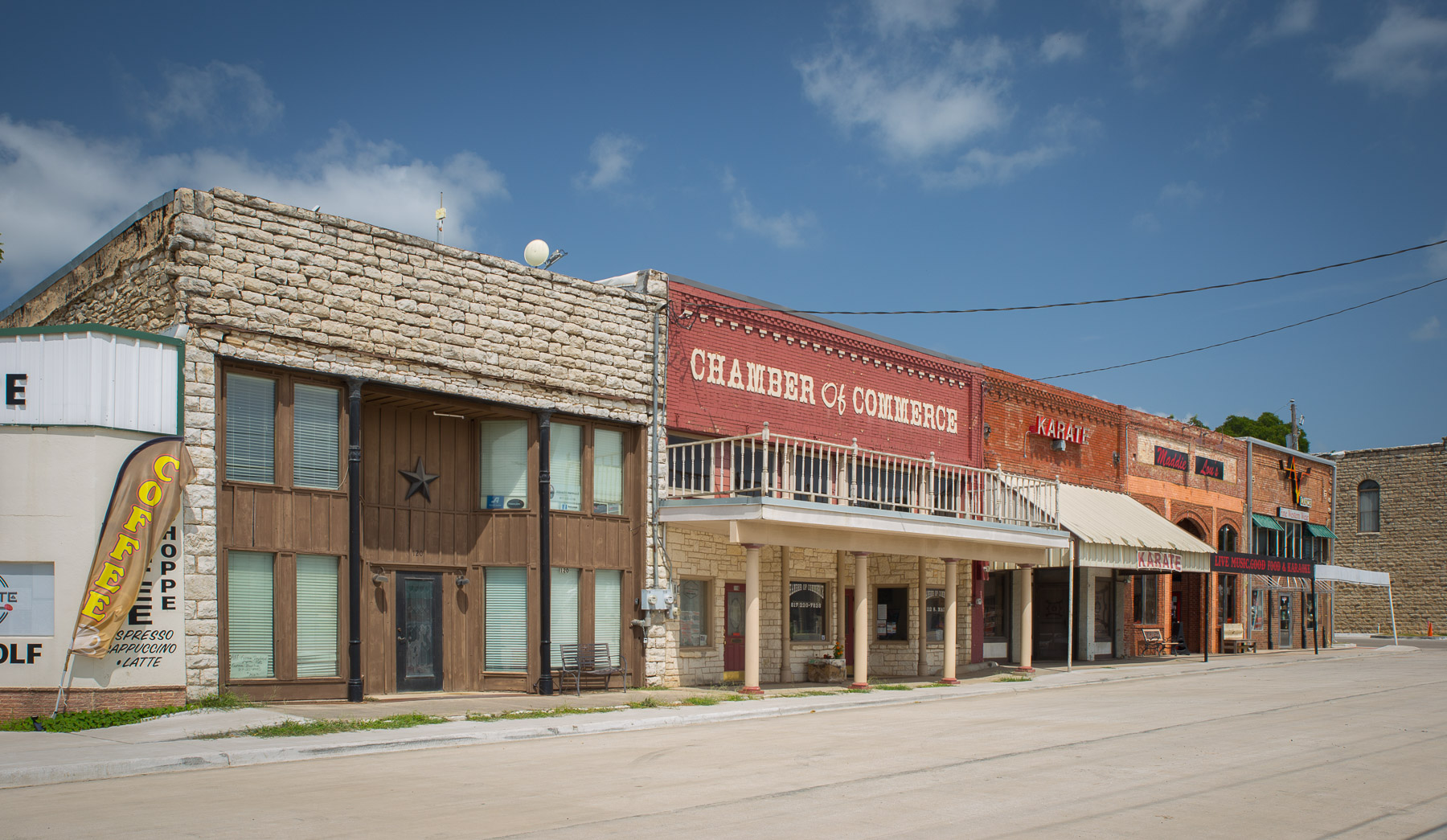
- Downtown Springtown, Texas

- Logo

- Location of Springtown in Parker County

- Location in Texas Location in the United States
- Coordinates: 32°59′23″N 97°40′37″W
- Country: United States
- State: Texas
- County: Parker, Wise

Area
  - Total: 3.03 sq mi (7.86 km^{2})
  - Land: 3.03 sq mi (7.86 km^{2})
  - Water: 0 sq mi (0.00 km^{2})
- Elevation: 866 ft (264 m)

Population (2020)
  - Total: 3,064
  - Density: 1,010/sq mi (389.8/km^{2})
- Time zone: UTC-6 (Central (CST))
  - Summer (DST): UTC-5 (CDT)
- ZIP code: 76082
- Area code: 817
- FIPS code: 48-69800
- GNIS feature ID: 2411962
- Website: cityofspringtown.com

Springtown is a town in Parker County and Wise County, Texas, United States. According to the 2020 census, the population was 3,064.

== History ==
Originally named Littleton's Springs by Joseph Ward, an early settler, the community was renamed Springtown in the mid-1870s. Springtown's post office opened in 1875. Springtown was incorporated in 1884.

Population growth slowed during and after the Great Depression, but resumed after 1960 due to commuters to and from Fort Worth.

Springtown was the site of College Hill Institute. The school was chartered by the State of Texas in 1884. It operated for ten years, and closed in 1894.

== Geography ==
According to the United States Census Bureau, the city has a total area of 2.8 square miles (7.3 km^{2}), all land.

=== Climate ===
The climate in this area is characterized by hot, humid summers and generally mild to cool winters. According to the Köppen Climate Classification system, Springtown has a humid subtropical climate, abbreviated "Cfa" on climate maps.

== Demographics ==
Historical population
Census	Pop.	Note	%±
1880	166		—
1890	657		295.8%
1960	859		—
1970	1,194		39.0%
1980	1,658		38.9%
1990	1,740		4.9%
2000	2,062		18.5%
2010	2,658		28.9%
2020	3,064		15.3%
2023 (est.)	4,181		36.5%
U.S. Decennial Census

=== 2020 census ===
As of the 2020 census, Springtown had a population of 3,064, 1,169 households, and 761 families residing in the city. The median age was 33.9 years. 27.9% of residents were under the age of 18 and 13.7% of residents were 65 years of age or older. For every 100 females there were 87.6 males, and for every 100 females age 18 and over there were 81.0 males age 18 and over.

The 2020 census reported 1,169 households, of which 39.2% had children under the age of 18 living in them. Of all households, 48.3% were married-couple households, 12.7% were households with a male householder and no spouse or partner present, and 31.1% were households with a female householder and no spouse or partner present. About 25.3% of all households were made up of individuals and 10.1% had someone living alone who was 65 years of age or older.

The 2020 census recorded 1,233 housing units, of which 5.2% were vacant. The homeowner vacancy rate was 1.6% and the rental vacancy rate was 3.5%.

The 2020 census reported that 0.0% of residents lived in urban areas, while 100.0% lived in rural areas.

Racial composition as of the 2020 census
Race	Number	Percent
White	2,561	83.6%
Black or African American	27	0.9%
American Indian and Alaska Native	34	1.1%
Asian	15	0.5%
Native Hawaiian and Other Pacific Islander	1	0.0%
Some other race	120	3.9%
Two or more races	306	10.0%
Hispanic or Latino (of any race)	391	12.8%

== Gallery ==
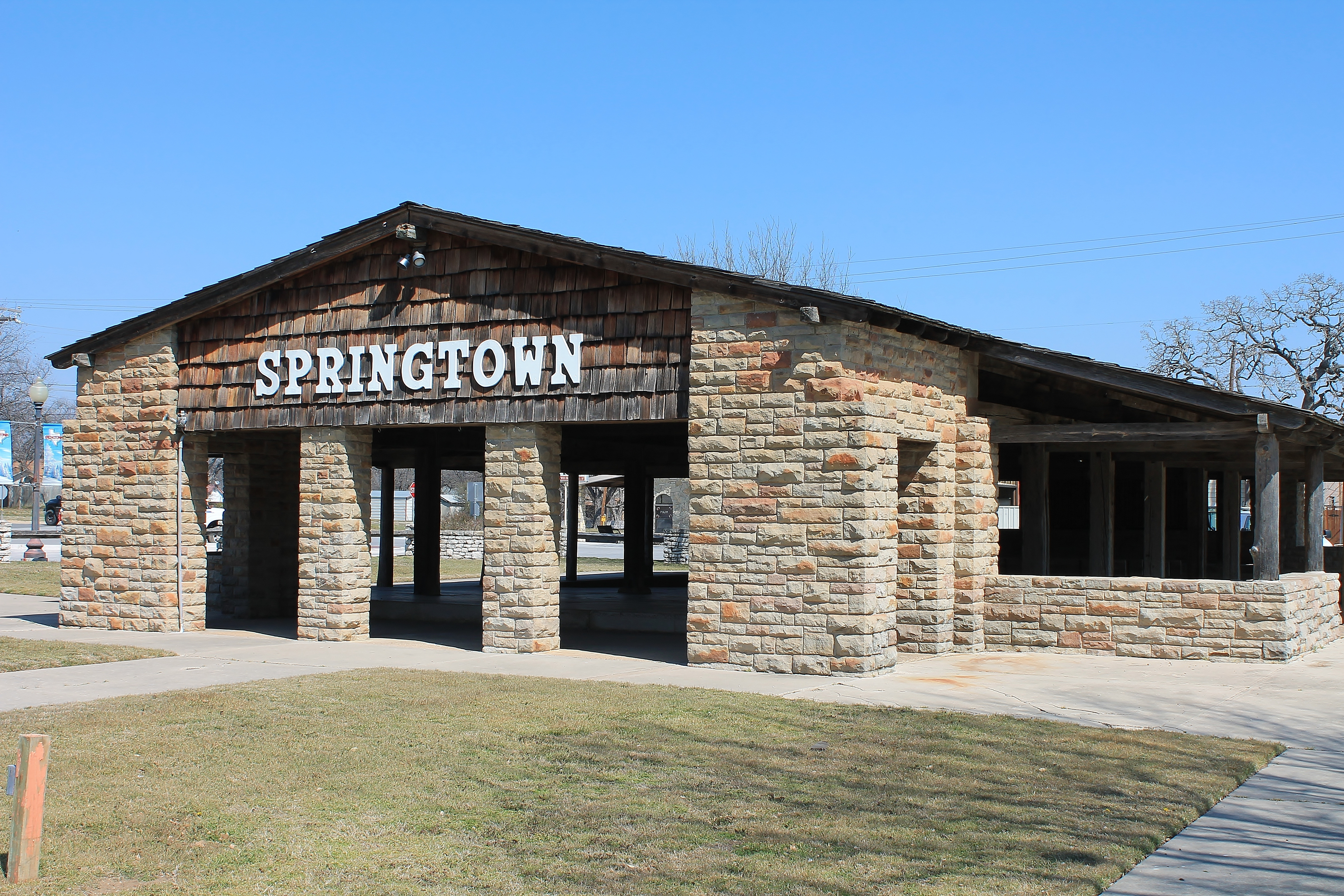
Springtown Tabernacle

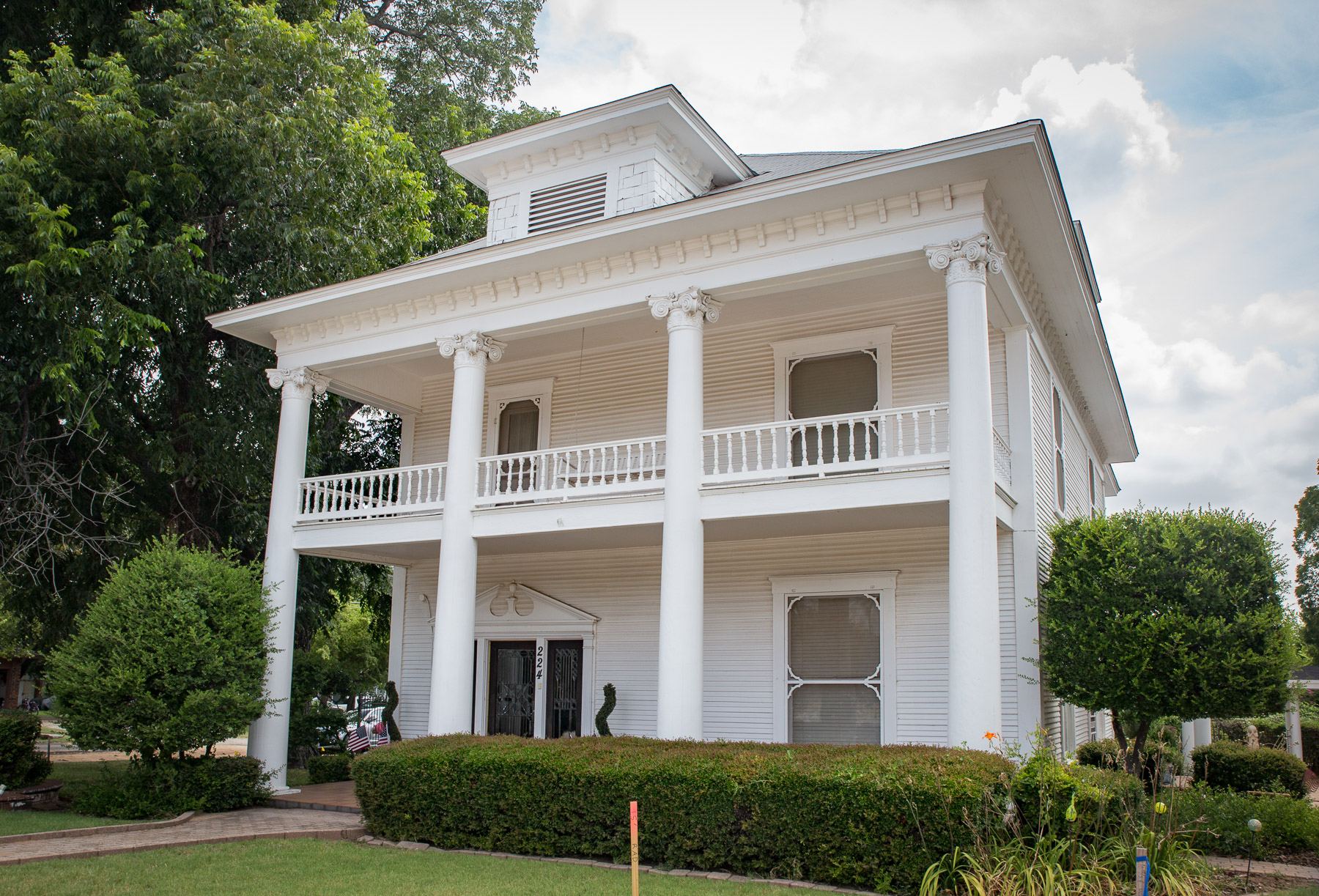
Dr. George and Ruth Jones House

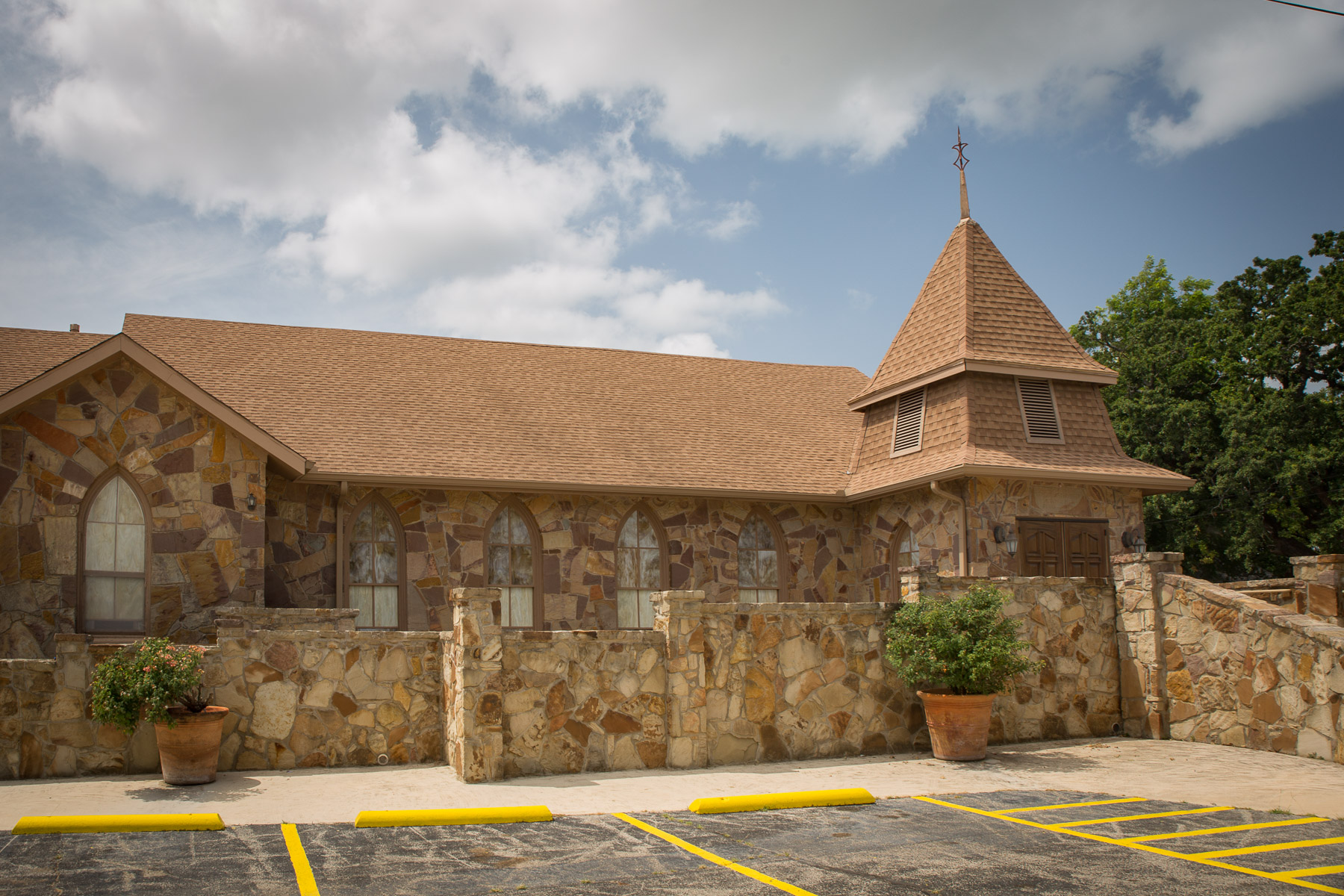
First United Methodist Church

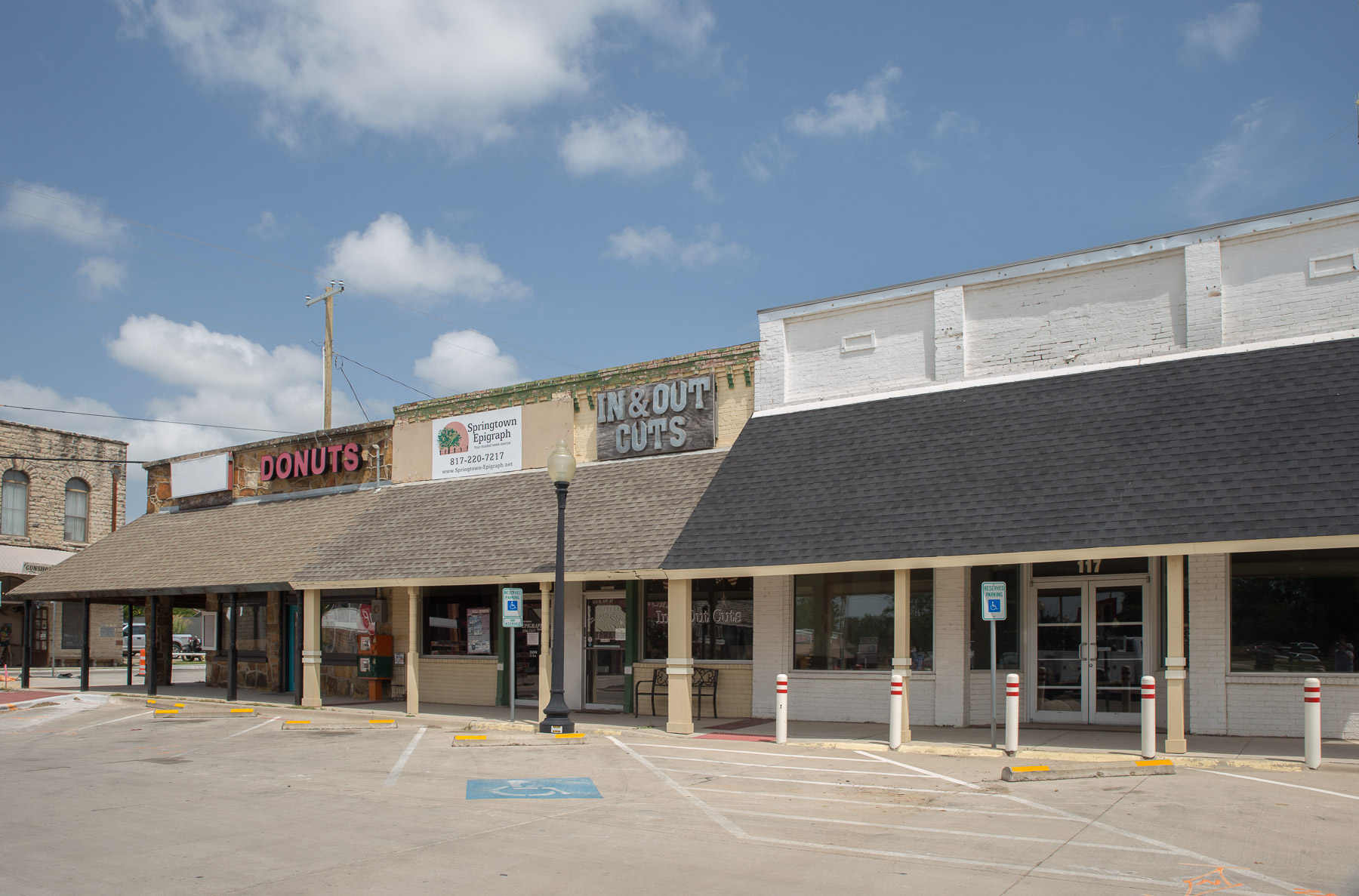
Downtown Springtown, Texas

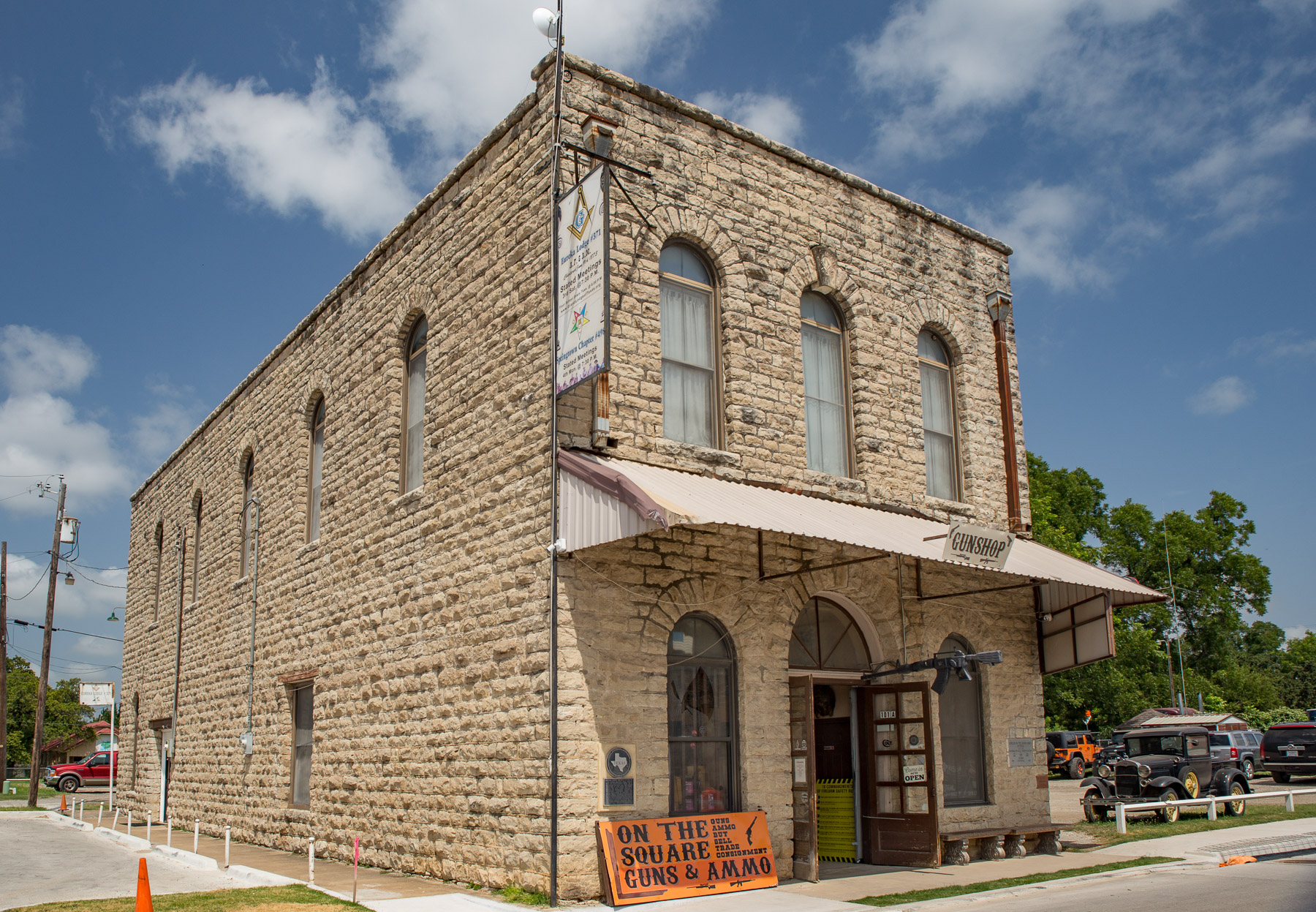
Eureka Lodge No. 317

== Notable people ==
- Ona Dodd, Major League Baseball player
- William H. Murray, student at College Hill Institute and Governor of Oklahoma
- Jim Marrs, journalist and public relations consultant
