= Stan Gray =

American baseball player (1888–1964)

- First baseman
- Born: December 10, 1888; Ladonia, Texas, United States
- Died: October 11, 1964 (aged 75); Snyder, Texas, United States
- Batted: Right Threw: Right

MLB debut
- September 17, 1912, for the Pittsburgh Pirates

Last MLB appearance
- October 1, 1912, for the Pittsburgh Pirates

MLB statistics
- Batting average: .250
- Home runs: 0
- Runs batted in: 2
- Stats at Baseball Reference

Teams
- Pittsburgh Pirates (1912)

Stanley Oscar Gray (December 10, 1888 – October 11, 1964) was a first baseman in Major League Baseball. He played for the Pittsburgh Pirates in 1912.
