= Ovid Nicholson =

American baseball player (1888–1968)

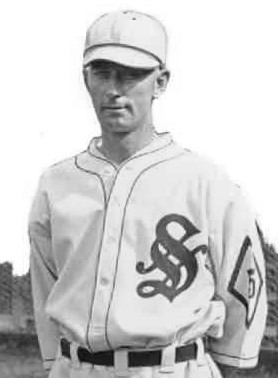
- Outfielder
- Born: December 30, 1888; Salem, Indiana, U.S.
- Died: March 24, 1968 (aged 79); Salem, Indiana, U.S.
- Batted: Left Threw: Right

MLB debut
- September 17, 1912, for the Pittsburgh Pirates

Last MLB appearance
- September 26, 1912, for the Pittsburgh Pirates

MLB statistics
- Batting average: .455
- Home runs: 0
- Runs batted in: 3
- Stats at Baseball Reference

Teams
- Pittsburgh Pirates (1912)

Ovid Edward Nicholson (December 30, 1888 – March 24, 1968) was an American outfielder in Major League Baseball. He played for the Pittsburgh Pirates in 1912.
