= John Frill =

American baseball player (1879–1918)

- Pitcher
- Born: April 3, 1879; Reading, Pennsylvania, U.S.
- Died: September 28, 1918 (aged 39); Westerly, Rhode Island, U.S.
- Batted: Right Threw: Left

MLB debut
- April 16, 1910, for the New York Highlanders

Last MLB appearance
- August 21, 1912, for the Cincinnati Reds

MLB statistics
- Win–loss record: 3–3
- Earned run average: 5.85
- Strikeouts: 33
- Stats at Baseball Reference

Teams
- New York Highlanders (1910); St. Louis Browns (1912); Cincinnati Reds (1912)

John Edmond Frill (April 3, 1879 – September 28, 1918) was an American Major League Baseball pitcher who played in 1910 and 1912 with the New York Highlanders, St. Louis Browns and the Cincinnati Reds. He batted right and threw left-handed.

He was born in Reading, Pennsylvania. Frill died in Westerly, Rhode Island of influenza A during the 1918–1920 flu pandemic.
