= Andy Kyle =

Canadian baseball and hockey player (1889–1971)

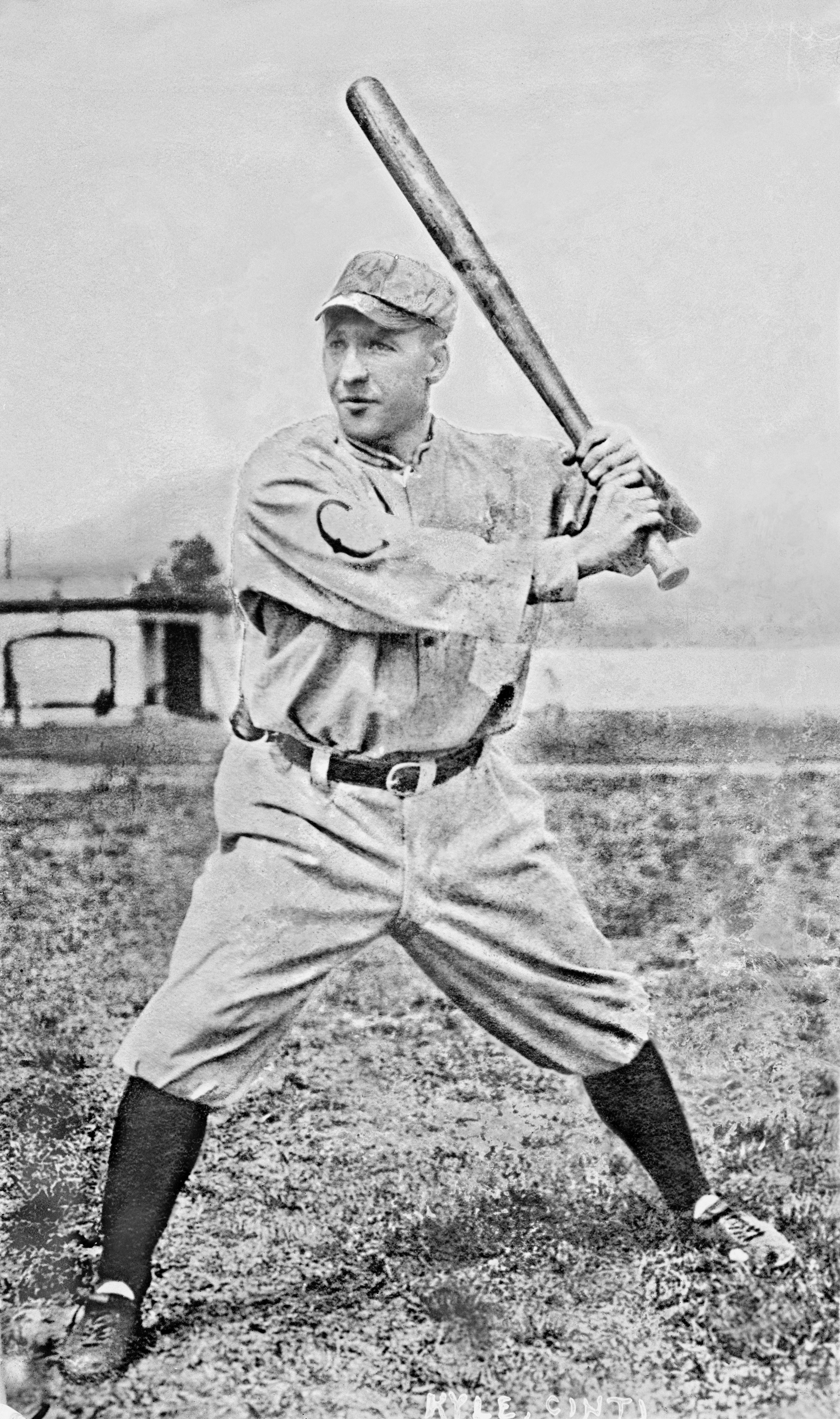
- Outfielder
- Born: October 29, 1889; Toronto, Ontario, Canada
- Died: September 6, 1971 (aged 81); Toronto, Ontario, Canada
- Batted: Left Threw: Left

MLB debut
- September 7, 1912, for the Cincinnati Reds

Last MLB appearance
- October 6, 1912, for the Cincinnati Reds

MLB statistics
- Batting average: .333
- Home runs: 0
- Runs batted in: 4

Teams
- Cincinnati Reds (1912)

Andrew Ewing Kyle (October 29, 1889 – September 6, 1971) was a Canadian Major League Baseball outfielder and National Hockey Association defenceman.

== Baseball ==
In baseball, Kyle turned professional with the Class A Toronto Maple Leafs in 1910. He didn't get much playing time and was sent to the Elgin Kittens of the Northern Association in May and then, when that league folded, to the Lawrence Colts of the New England League in July. Kyle rejoined the Leafs in September. In 1911, he played for Troy in the New York State League but was released in May. Kyle then joined the London Tecumsehs in the Canadian League. The following season, he played for the Columbus Senators of the American Association and for the Akron Rubbermen of the Central League.

Kyle was purchased by the Cincinnati Reds, playing in his first major league game on September 7, 1912, and his last on October 6, 1912. He appeared in nine games and hit .333 (7-for-21) with four runs batted in and three runs scored. He drew four walks which pushed his on-base percentage up to .440. In seven outfield appearances he handled 16 chances without an error. The 22-year-old stood 5'8" and weighed 160 lbs.

After his brief major league stint, Kyle played for the New Orleans Pelicans of the Southern Association in 1913, where his batting average fell to .194. He continued to play on and off in the minors until 1921, spending his last three seasons with the Kitchener Beavers of the Michigan-Ontario League.

== Hockey ==
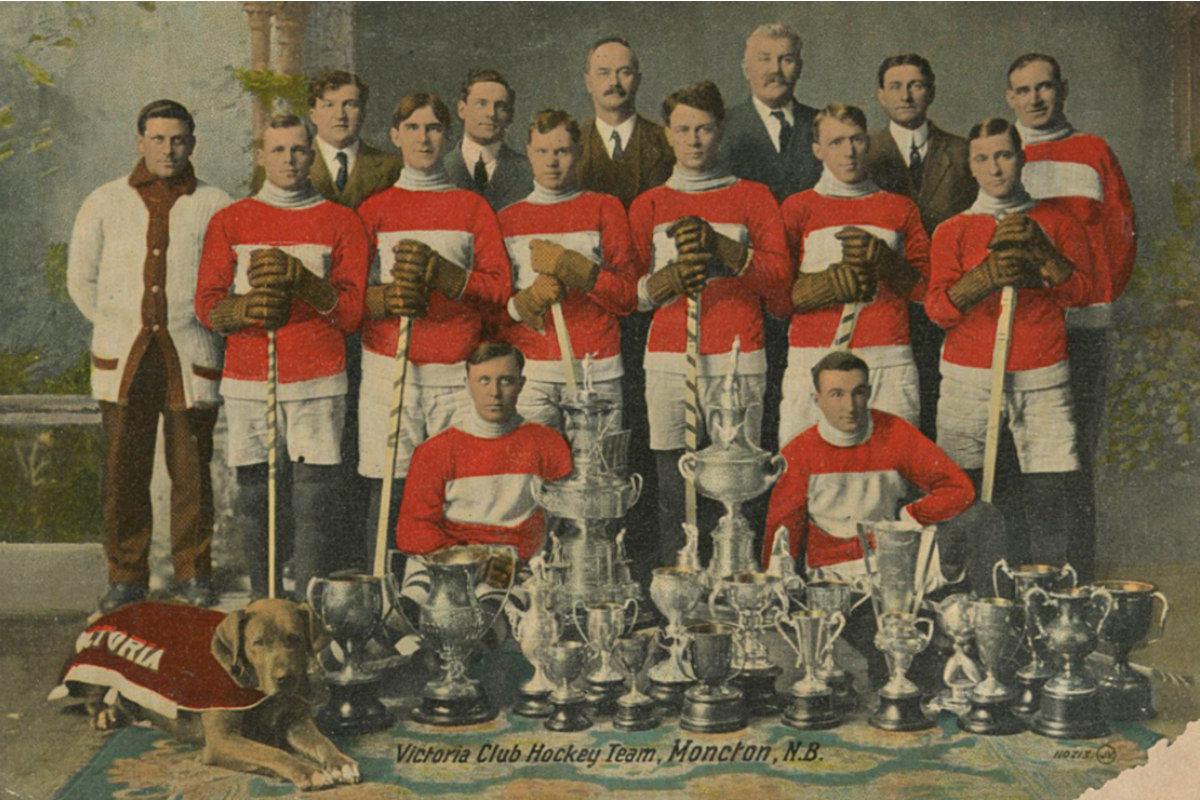
Kyle, first from right in the middle row, with the Moncton Victorias in 1912–13.

As an ice hockey player, Kyle played junior with the Eurekas in Toronto in the 1908–09 season. He was team captain and led the Eurekas to the Ontario Hockey Association finals, where they lost to Stratford. In September 1909, he announced that he was giving up hockey to become a full-time silver prospector in Northern Ontario, but returned after seven weeks. He was captain of the Parkdale Canoe Club senior team for the 1909–10 season until leaving to join the Maple Leafs' baseball training camp.

Kyle played with the professional team in Port Hope, Ontario, for the 1910–11 season and worked as a referee following an injury. He continued as a referee in 1912. He attended the inaugural training camp of the Toronto Blueshirts in 1912, but left the team before the season began to play for Moncton Victorias of the MaPHL. He played there for two seasons. He was captain of the team in Glace Bay, Nova Scotia, early in the 1914–15 season. Kyle rejoined the Blueshirts in the National Hockey Association for the 1916–17 season.

Kyle died in his hometown of Toronto at the age of 81, and he is buried at Park Lawn Cemetery.
