= Ed Mensor =

American baseball player (1885–1970)

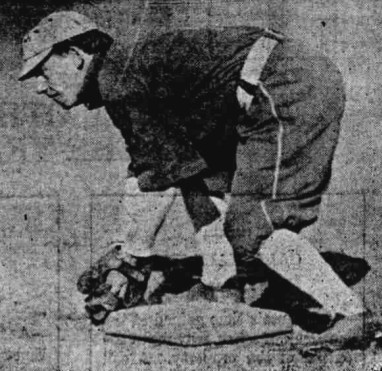
- Outfielder
- Born: November 7, 1885; Woodville, Oregon, U.S.
- Died: April 20, 1970 (aged 84); Salem, Oregon, U.S.
- Batted: Both Threw: Right

MLB debut
- July 15, 1912, for the Pittsburgh Pirates

Last MLB appearance
- September 7, 1914, for the Pittsburgh Pirates

MLB statistics
- Batting average: .221
- Home runs: 1
- Runs batted in: 8
- Stats at Baseball Reference

Teams
- Pittsburgh Pirates (1912–1914)

Edward Mensor (November 7, 1885 – April 20, 1970) was an American outfielder in Major League Baseball. He stood 5 feet 6 inches (1.68 m) tall and weighed 145 pounds (66 kg). Nicknamed "The Midget", he played for the Pittsburgh Pirates. He was born in Woodville, Oregon, and was Jewish. He died in Salem, Oregon.

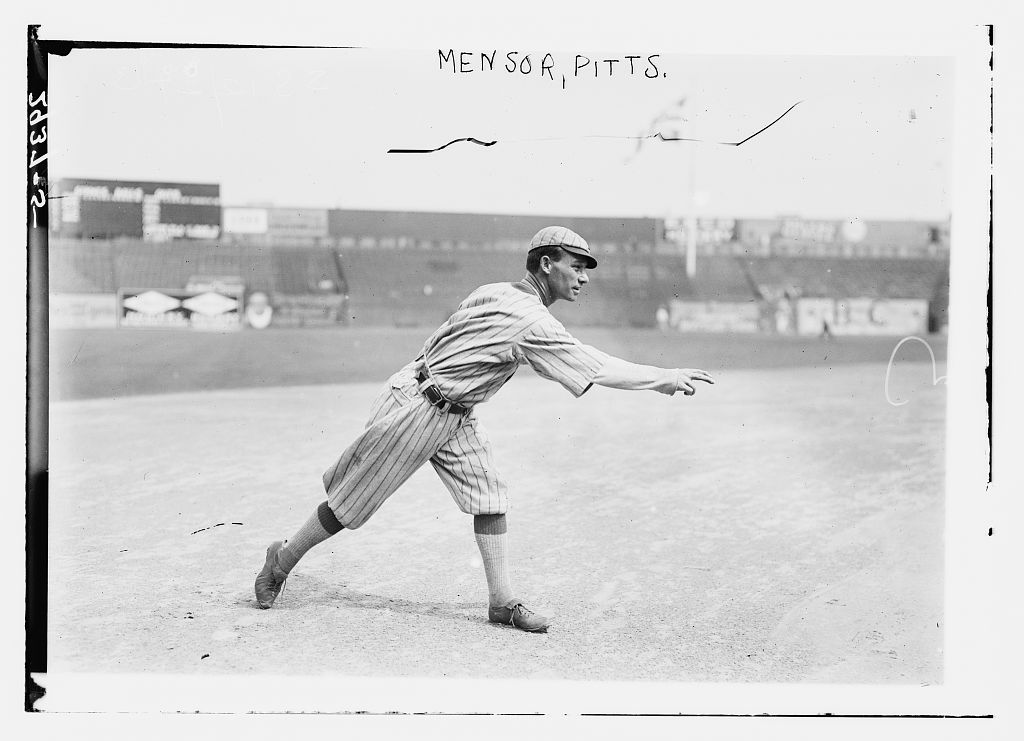
Mensor in 1913
