= Hanson Horsey =

American baseball player (1889–1949)

- Pitcher
- Born: November 26, 1889; Galena, Maryland, U.S.
- Died: December 1, 1949 (aged 60); Millington, Maryland, U.S.
- Batted: Right Threw: Right

MLB debut
- April 27, 1912, for the Cincinnati Reds

Last MLB appearance
- April 27, 1912, for the Cincinnati Reds

MLB statistics
- Win–loss record: 0–0
- Earned run average: 22.50
- Strikeouts: 0
- Stats at Baseball Reference

Teams
- Cincinnati Reds (1912)

Hanson Horsey (November 26, 1889 – December 1, 1949) was an American professional baseball player who played in one game for the Cincinnati Reds during the 1912 season. He was born in Galena, Maryland and died in Millington, Maryland at the age of 60.

He began his minor league career in 1910 with the Reading Pretzels of the Tri-State League. His best year in the minors was with Reading in 1911 when he had a record of 22–10 in 33 appearances. After his major league appearance, he continued to play minor league baseball and later became an umpire, primarily in the Eastern Shore League. His last season was with the Jersey City Skeeters in 1918.
