= Chuck Tompkins =

American baseball player (1889–1975)

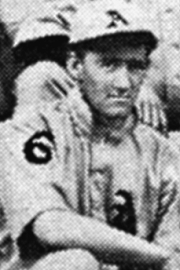
- Pitcher
- Born: September 1, 1889; Prescott, Arkansas, U.S.
- Died: September 20, 1975 (aged 86); Prescott, Arkansas, U.S.
- Batted: Right Threw: Right

MLB debut
- June 25, 1912, for the Cincinnati Reds

Last MLB appearance
- June 25, 1912, for the Cincinnati Reds

MLB statistics
- Games played: 1
- Innings pitched: 3
- Earned run average: 0.00
- Stats at Baseball Reference

Teams
- Cincinnati Reds (1912)

Charles Herbert Tompkins (September 1, 1889 – September 20, 1975) was an American pitcher in Major League Baseball. He was born in Prescott, Arkansas and played for the Cincinnati Reds.

A single in his only turn at-bat left Tompkins with a rare MLB career batting average of 1.000.
