= Ben Taylor (pitcher, born 1889) =

American baseball player (1889–1946)

- Pitcher
- Born: April 2, 1889; Paoli, Indiana, U.S.
- Died: November 3, 1946 (aged 57); Martin County, Indiana, U.S.
- Batted: Right Threw: Right

MLB debut
- June 28, 1912, for the Cincinnati Reds

Last MLB appearance
- July 4, 1912, for the Cincinnati Reds

MLB statistics
- Win–loss record: 0–0
- Earned run average: 3.18
- Strikeouts: 2
- Stats at Baseball Reference

Teams
- Cincinnati Reds (1912)

Benjamin Harrison Taylor (April 2, 1889 – November 3, 1946) was an American professional baseball player who played pitcher in the Major Leagues for the 1912 Cincinnati Reds. Prior to that, he pitched for the Cincinnati Pippins of the United States Baseball League, until that team disbanded in June 1912. After his Major League stint, he moved to Bedford, Indiana and became an interior designer. He died in an automobile accident, of which he was the sole fatality (his wife and his parents-in-law all survived), in 1946.
