= Cincinnati Reds all-time roster =

List of baseball players

This list is complete and up-to-date as of July 8, 2024.

The following is a list of players, both past and current, who appeared at least in one game for the Cincinnati Reds National League franchise (1890–1953, 1958–present), also known previously as the Cincinnati Red Stockings (1882–1889) and Cincinnati Redlegs (1953–1958). Players in Bold are members of the National Baseball Hall of Fame.

Players in Italics have had their numbers retired by the team.

== A ==
- Andrew Abbott
- Andy Abad
- Ted Abernathy
- Cal Abrams
- George Abrams
- Joe Abreu
- José Acevedo
- Tom Acker
- Bobby Adams
- Karl Adams
- Sparky Adams
- Joe Adcock
- Nate Adcock
- Jon Adkins
- Tim Adleman
- Troy Afenir
- Jeremy Affeldt
- Julian Aguiar
- Shogo Akiyama
- Ruben Alaniz
- Santo Alcalá
- Arismendy Alcántara
- Chuck Aleno
- Bob Allen
- Ethan Allen
- Nick Allen
- Carlos Almanzar
- Rafael Almeida
- Albert Almora
- Yonder Alonso
- Dave Altizer
- Rogelio Álvarez
- Red Ames
- Vicente Amor
- Chase Anderson
- Harry Anderson
- Jimmy Anderson
- Mike Anderson
- Wingo Anderson
- Nate Andrews
- Miguel Andújar
- Eric Anthony
- Tejay Antone
- Pete Appleton
- Aristides Aquino
- Jimmy Archer
- Ed Armbrister
- Jack Armstrong
- Morrie Arnovich
- José Arredondo
- Gerry Arrigo
- Bronson Arroyo
- Edwin Arroyo
- Luis Arroyo
- Bob Asbjornson
- Ken Ash
- Graham Ashcraft
- Barrett Astin
- Justin Atchley
- Rick Auerbach
- Rich Aurilia
- Jeff Austin
- Chick Autry
- Steve Avery
- Jay Avrea
- Dylan Axelrod
- Bobby Ayala
- Manuel Aybar
- Joe Azcue

== B ==
- Fred Baczewski
- Burke Badenhop
- Harrison Bader
- Jim Bagby, Sr.
- Bob Bailey
- Ed Bailey
- Homer Bailey
- Jim Bailey
- King Bailey
- Doug Bair
- Bill Baker
- Ernie Baker
- Paul Bako
- Bobby Balcena
- Jack Baldschun
- Frank Baldwin
- Kid Baldwin
- John Bale
- Mike Balenti
- Wladimir Balentien
- Collin Balester
- Dick Baney
- Will Banfield
- Scott Bankhead
- Kevin Barker
- Scott Barlow
- Junie Barnes
- Skeeter Barnes
- Tucker Barnhart
- Germán Barranca
- Jimmy Barrett
- Red Barrett
- Jose Barrero
- Shad Barry
- Kimera Bartee
- Bob Barton
- Billy Bates
- Johnny Bates
- Matt Batts
- Trevor Bauer
- Jim Baumer
- Frank Baumholtz
- Harry Bay
- Dick Bayless
- Johnny Beall
- Ollie Beard
- Jim Beauchamp
- Cam Bedrosian
- Roger Bernadina
- Boom-Boom Beck
- Clyde Beck
- Erve Beck
- Fred Beck
- Beals Becker
- **Jake Beckley**
- Jim Beckman
- Fred Beebe
- Jodie Beeler
- Joe Beggs
- Jim Begley
- Mel Behney
- Tim Belcher
- Stan Belinda
- Bo Belinsky
- Matt Belisle
- Tim Belk
- Buddy Bell
- Gus Bell
- Mike Bell
- Rob Bell
- Trevor Bell
- Mark Bellhorn
- Freddie Benavides
- **Johnny Bench**
- Ray Benge
- Will Benson
- Larry Benton
- Rube Benton
- Todd Benzinger
- Jason Bere
- Bruce Berenyi
- Bill Bergen
- Wally Berger
- Marty Berghammer
- William Bergolla
- Frank Berkelbach
- Gerónimo Berroa
- Damon Berryhill
- Bob Bescher
- Harry Betts
- Hal Bevan
- Dante Bichette
- Dan Bickham
- Jesse Biddle
- Harry Biemiller
- Larry Biittner
- Dann Bilardello
- Steve Bilko
- Jack Billingham
- Tim Birtsas
- Joe Black
- Earl Blackburn
- Jim Blackburn
- Lena Blackburne
- Ewell Blackwell
- Paul Blair
- Ed Blake
- Linc Blakely
- Alex Blandino
- Fred Blank
- Cliff Blankenship
- Don Blasingame
- Steve Blateric
- Ned Bligh
- Jimmy Bloodworth
- Willie Bloomquist
- Jack Blott
- Otto Bluege
- Jim Bluejacket
- Len Boehmer
- Sam Bohne
- Jim Bolger
- Tom Bolton
- Ricky Bones
- Jung Bong
- Nino Bongiovanni
- Bill Bonham
- Lisalverto Bonilla
- Brennan Boesch
- Chris Booker
- Aaron Boone
- Bret Boone
- Pedro Borbón
- Frenchy Bordagaray
- Bob Borkowski
- Steve Boros
- Mel Bosser
- **Jim Bottomley**
- Jason Bourgeois
- Joe Bowman
- Matt Bowman
- Ray Boyd
- Jack Boyle
- Brad Brach
- Silvino Bracho
- Buddy Bradford
- Scott Bradley
- Archie Bradley
- Neal Brady
- Darren Bragg
- Glenn Braggs
- Dave Brain
- Jeff Branson
- Jeff Brantley
- Russell Branyan
- Ángel Bravo
- Bill Bray
- Danny Breeden
- Ted Breitenstein
- Don Brennan
- Lynn Brenton
- Rube Bressler
- Charlie Brewster
- Austin Brice
- Marshall Bridges
- Rocky Bridges
- Al Bridwell
- Harry Bright
- Gus Brittain
- Jim Brosnan
- Joe Brovia
- Jim Brower
- Curly Brown
- Jumbo Brown
- Keith Brown
- Marty Brown
- **Mordecai Brown**
- Scott Brown
- Stub Brown
- Pete Browning
- Tom Browning
- Jonathan Broxton
- Jay Bruce
- Frank Bruggy
- Jacob Brumfield
- Bob Buchanan
- David Buchanan
- Jake Buchanan
- Mark Budzinski
- Dave Burba
- Smoky Burgess
- Brock Burke
- Eddie Burke
- Ken Burkhart
- Bill Burns
- Chase Burns
- George Burns
- Joe Burns
- Mike Burns
- Sheldon Burnside
- Alan Busenitz
- George Burpo
- Jared Burton
- Guy Bush
- Jack Bushelman
- Chris Bushing
- Sal Butera
- Bud Byerly
- Sammy Byrd
- Marlon Byrd

== C ==
- Jolbert Cabrera
- Orlando Cabrera
- Asdrúbal Cabrera
- Ramon Cadrera
- Greg Cadaret
- Miguel Cairo
- Mike Caldwell
- Marty Callaghan
- Ray Callahan
- Tyler Callihan
- Mike Cameron
- Archie Campbell
- Billy Campbell
- Gilly Campbell
- Jim Canavan
- Jeimer Candelario
- Jorge Cantú
- Tom Cantwell
- Conner Capel
- Doug Capilla
- Bernie Carbo
- Leo Cárdenas
- Don Carman
- Chet Carmichael
- Hick Carpenter
- Charlie Carr
- Giovanni Carrara
- Héctor Carrasco
- Clay Carroll
- Ownie Carroll
- Tom Carroll
- Arnold Carter
- Howie Carter
- Bob Caruthers
- Curt Casali
- Joe Cascarella
- Charlie Case
- Sean Casey
- Luis Castillo
- Wilkin Castillo
- Nick Castellanos
- Roy Castleton
- Juan Castro
- Keefe Cato
- Ike Caveney
- César Cedeño
- Juan Cerros
- Luis Cessa
- Alejandro Chacín
- Elio Chacón
- Elton Chamberlain
- Jim Chamblee
- Darrel Chaney
- Aroldis Chapman
- Calvin Chapman
- Harry Chapman
- Bill Chappelle
- Chappy Charles
- Norm Charlton
- Hal Chase
- Charlie Chech
- Bruce Chen
- Shin-Soo Choo
- Harry Chozen
- Cuckoo Christensen
- Steve Christmas
- Bubba Church
- Tony Cingrani
- Bob Clark
- Brady Clark
- Jermaine Clark
- Lefty Clarke
- Tommy Clarke
- Brandon Claussen
- Dain Clay
- Royce Clayton
- Ty Cline
- Billy Clingman
- Jim Clinton
- Tony Cloninger
- Andy Coakley
- Jim Coates
- Buck Coats
- Goat Cochran
- Todd Coffey
- Jimmie Coker
- Gordy Coleman
- Percy Coleman
- Vince Coleman
- Chuck Coles
- Darnell Coles
- Dave Collins
- Jackie Collum
- Christian Colon
- Geoff Combe
- **Charlie Comiskey**
- Adam Comorosky
- Jack Compton
- Dave Concepción
- Jeff Conine
- Snipe Conley
- Theodore Conover
- Carlos Contreras
- Cliff Cook
- Dusty Cooke
- Steve Cooke
- Walker Cooper
- Claude Corbitt
- Daniel Corcino
- Mickey Corcoran
- Tommy Corcoran
- Francisco Cordero
- Pop Corkhill
- Rhéal Cormier
- Pat Corrales
- Vic Correll
- Mike Costanzo
- Tim Costo
- Caleb Cotham
- Johnny Couch
- Bob Coulson
- Fritz Coumbe
- John Courtright
- Jon Coutlangus
- Harry Coveleski
- Zack Cozart
- Estel Crabtree
- Harry Craft
- Roger Craig
- Bill Cramer
- Ed Crane
- Sam Crane
- Pat Crawford
- **Sam Crawford**
- Pete Cregan
- Walker Cress
- Tony Criscola
- Hughie Critz
- Kyle Crockett
- D. T. Cromer
- Ned Crompton
- Jack Cronin
- Ed Crosby
- Lem Cross
- Jack Crouch
- George Crowe
- Jim Crowell
- Terry Crowley
- Enrique Cruz
- Fernando Cruz
- Héctor Cruz
- Jacob Cruz
- Tony Cruz
- Tony Cuccinello
- Mike Cuellar
- Johnny Cueto
- Manuel Cueto
- Nick Cullop
- George Culver
- Clarence Currie
- Ervin Curtis
- **Kiki Cuyler**

== D ==
- Gene Dale
- Tom Daley
- Tom Daly
- Bill Dammann
- Bert Daniels
- Kal Daniels
- George Darby
- Pat Darcy
- Frank Dasso
- Dan Daub
- Jake Daubert
- Jack Daugherty
- Dave Davenport
- Ted Davidson
- Dixie Davis
- Eric Davis
- Rookie Davis
- Kiddo Davis
- Lance Davis
- Lefty Davis
- Peaches Davis
- Spud Davis
- Wiley Davis
- Travis Dawkins
- Pea Ridge Day
- Ivan De Jesus Jr.
- Elly De La Cruz
- Tommy de la Cruz
- Mike de la Hoz
- Jose De Leon
- Ren Deagle
- Snake Deal
- Charlie DeArmond
- Arturo DeFreites
- Pat Deisel
- Mike Dejan
- Jim Delahanty
- Steve Delbar
- Abel De Los Santos
- Rich DeLucia
- Enerio del Rosario
- Ryan Dempster
- Ryan Dennick
- John Denny
- Chris Denorfia
- Tony DePhillips
- Claud Derrick
- Paul Derringer
- Anthony DeSclafani
- Delino DeShields
- Elmer Dessens
- Josh Devore
- Bo Díaz
- Dayan Diaz
- Jumbo Díaz
- Alexis Diaz
- Rob Dibble
- Pedro Dibut
- Chris Dickerson
- Jim Dickson
- Derek Dietrich
- Vince DiMaggio
- Leo Dixon
- Brandon Dixon
- Bill Doak
- John Dobbs
- Jess Dobernic
- John Dodge
- Cozy Dolan (1903-05)
- Cozy Dolan (1909)
- John Dolan
- Ed Donalds
- Mike Donlin
- Pete Donohue
- Red Dooin
- Sean Doolittle
- Bill Doran
- Gus Dorner
- Brian Dorsett
- Jack Doscher
- Dutch Dotterer
- Phil Douglas
- Astyanax Douglass
- Taylor Douthit
- Tom Downey
- Tom Dowse
- Jim Doyle
- Slow Joe Doyle
- Moe Drabowsky
- Chuck Dressen
- Karl Drews
- Dan Driessen
- Walt Dropo
- Carl Druhot
- Brandon Drury
- Daniel Duarte
- Jean Dubuc
- Jim Duffalo
- Charlie Duffee
- Frank Duffy
- Zach Duke
- Phil Dumatrait
- Dan Dumoulin
- Mariano Duncan
- Pat Duncan
- Adam Dunn
- Blake Dunn
- Blaine Durbin
- Ryne Duren
- Leon Durham
- Bobby Durnbaugh
- **Leo Durocher**
- Jesse Duryea
- Adam Duvall
- Joe Dwyer
- Frank Dwyer
- Jim Dyck

== E ==
- Billy Earle
- Rawly Eastwick
- Al Eckert
- Joe Edelen
- Jim Edmonds
- Bruce Edwards
- Hank Edwards
- Jim Joe Edwards
- Johnny Edwards
- Sherman Edwards
- Dick Egan
- Red Ehret
- Rube Ehrhardt
- Joey Eischen
- Jake Eisenhart
- Kid Elberfeld
- Roy Ellam
- Hod Eller
- Claude Elliott
- Sammy Ellis
- Jason Ellison
- Jake Elmore
- Frank Emmer
- Edwin Encarnación
- Juan Encarnación
- Christian Encarnacion-Strand
- Joe Engel
- Charlie English
- Del Ennis
- Eddie Erautt
- Hank Erickson
- Phil Ervin
- Tex Erwin
- Nick Esasky
- Nino Escalera
- Jimmy Esmond
- Cecil Espy
- Santiago Espinal
- Bill Essick
- Shawn Estes
- Seth Etherton
- Bob Ewing
- **Buck Ewing**

== F ==
- Pete Fahrer
- Stuart Fairchild
- Frank Fanovich
- Buck Farmer
- Kyle Farmer
- Luke Farrel
- Buck Fausett
- Scott Feldman
- Michael Feliz
- Frank Fennelly
- Bob Ferguson
- Jared Fernández
- Osvaldo Fernández
- Tony Fernández
- Al Ferrara
- Neil Fiala
- Steve Filipowicz
- Brandon Finnegan
- Hank Fischer
- Bob Fisher
- Carlos Fisher
- Chauncey Fisher
- Jack Fisher
- Maurice Fisher
- Ray Fisher
- Paul Fittery
- Ray Fitzgerald
- Wally Flager
- Sam Fletcher
- Dylan Floro
- Curt Flood
- Jake Flowers
- Carney Flynn
- Doug Flynn
- Josh Fogg
- Lee Fohl
- Hank Foiles
- Tom Foley
- Dee Fondy
- Lew Fonseca
- Hod Ford
- Mike Ford
- Brook Fordyce
- Brownie Foreman
- Frank Foreman
- Tim Fortugno
- George Foster
- Steve Foster
- Henry Fournier
- Art Fowler
- Boob Fowler
- Bill Fox
- Howie Fox
- Ty France
- Jeff Francis
- Juan Francisco
- John Franco
- Terry Francona
- Mike Frank
- Ryan Franklin
- Chick Fraser
- Jake Fraley
- Joe Frazier
- Todd Frazier
- Tim Federowicz
- Roger Freed
- Ryan Freel
- Hersh Freeman
- Mike Freeman
- Gene Freese
- Tony Freitas
- Benny Frey
- Lonny Frey
- Jim Fridley
- TJ Friedl
- John Frill
- Emil Frisk
- Art Fromme
- Woodie Fryman
- Carson Fulmer
- Chick Fulmer

== G ==
- Phil Gagliano
- Joe Gaines
- Augie Galan
- Milt Galatzer
- Rich Gale
- Yovani Gallardo
- Freddy Galvis
- Lee Gamble
- Ron Gant
- John Ganzel
- Aramis Garcia
- Guillermo Garcia
- Julian Garcia
- Leo García
- Edgar Garcia
- Greg Garrett
- Amir Gerrett
- Harry Gaspar
- Hank Gastright
- Kevin Gausman
- Bob Geary
- Paul Gehrman
- Phil Geier
- Charlie Gelbert
- Frank Genins
- Scooter Gennett
- Lefty George
- Justin Germano
- Ed Gerner
- Dick Gernert
- César Gerónimo
- Gus Getz
- Ian Gibaut
- Joe Gibbon
- Steve Gibralter
- Jerry Gil
- Buddy Gilbert
- Wally Gilbert
- Haddie Gill
- John Gillespie
- Mychal Givens
- Keith Glauber
- Jim Gleeson
- Martin Glendon
- Norm Glockson
- Jot Goar
- Lonnie Goldstein
- Jonny Gomes
- Jesse Gonder
- Álex González
- Mike González
- Raúl González
- Tony González
- Johnny Gooch
- Ival Goodman
- Curtis Goodwin
- Marv Goodwin
- Glen Gorbous
- Keith Gordon
- Mike Gosling
- Phil Gosselin
- Ashton Goudeau
- Mike Grace
- Tiny Graham
- Alex Grammas
- Wayne Granger
- Eddie Grant
- George Grantham
- Danny Graves
- Juan Graterol
- Bill Gray
- Jeff Gray
- Sonny Gray
- Gary Green
- Gene Green
- Hunter Greene
- Rick Greene
- Willie Greene
- Jim Greengrass
- Tommy Gregg
- Kevin Gregg
- Frank Gregory
- Didi Gregorius
- Ken Griffey, Sr.
- **Ken Griffey Jr.**
- Mike Griffin
- Pat Griffin
- Clark Griffith
- Tommy Griffith
- Bob Grim
- Ross Grimsley
- Lee Grissom
- Heinie Groh
- Don Gross
- Kip Gross
- Matt Grott
- Eddie Guardado
- Marv Gudat
- Wilton Guerrero
- Gabriel Guerrero
- Whitey Guese
- José Guillén
- Lefty Guise
- Brad Gulden
- Don Gullett
- Bill Gullickson
- Harry Gumbert
- Vladimir Gutierrez
- Juan Guzmán

== H ==
- Bert Haas
- Emil Haberer
- Warren Hacker
- Harvey Haddix
- Bud Hafey
- **Chick Hafey**
- Leo Hafford
- Joe Hague
- Noodles Hahn
- **Jesse Haines**
- Jerry Hairston Jr.
- Charley Hall
- Josh Hall
- Tom Hall
- Bill Hallahan
- Jocko Halligan
- Billy Hamilton
- Joey Hamilton
- Josh Hamilton
- Chris Hammond
- Jeffrey Hammonds
- Garrett Hampson
- Josh Hancock
- Donovan Hand
- Lee Handley
- Ryan Hanigan
- Jack Hannahan
- Erik Hanson
- Aaron Harang
- Bubbles Hargrave
- Dick Harley
- Chuck Harmon
- Pete Harnisch
- George Harper
- Jack Harper
- Tommy Harper
- Andy Harrington
- Jerry Harrington
- Bill Harris
- Brendan Harris
- Greg Harris
- Lenny Harris
- Willie Harris
- Earl Harrist
- Frank Harter
- Topsy Hartsel
- Matt Harvey
- Billy Hatcher
- Fred Hatfield
- Scott Hatteberg
- Grady Hatton
- Phil Haugstad
- Pink Hawley
- Gene Hayden
- Ben Hayes
- Drew Hayes
- Ke'Bryan Hayes
- Jimmy Haynes
- Austin Hays
- Bob Hazle
- Mickey Heath
- Cliff Heathcote
- John Heileman
- **Harry Heilmann**
- Chris Heisey
- Scott Heineman
- Crese Heismann
- Tommy Helms
- George Hemming
- Rollie Hemsley
- Heath Hembree
- Joe Henderson
- Ken Henderson
- Harvey Hendrick
- Ryan Hendrix
- Bobby Henrich
- Bill Henry
- Dwayne Henry
- George Henry
- Ernie Herbert
- Félix Heredia
- Jimmy Herget
- Kevin Herget
- Babe Herman
- Jeremy Hermida
- César Hernández
- Ramón Hernández
- Xavier Hernandez
- David Hernandez
- Ariel Hernández
- Daniel Herrera
- Rosell Herrera
- Dilson Herrera
- Leroy Herrmann
- Willard Hershberger
- Buck Herzog
- Johnny Hetki
- Ed Heusser
- Andy High
- Whitey Hilcher
- Bill Hill
- Milt Hill
- Frank Hiller
- Dave Hillman
- Bill Hinchman
- Rece Hinds
- Rich Hinton
- Roy Hitt
- Don Hoak
- Bill Hobbs
- Dick Hoblitzel
- Ed Hock
- Joe Hoerner
- Guy Hoffman
- Jeff Hoffman
- Kenny Hogan
- Marty Hogan
- George Hogreiver
- Aaron Holbert
- Ken Holcombe
- Bill Holden
- Walter Holke
- Mul Holland
- Todd Hollandsworth
- Bug Holliday
- Al Hollingsworth
- David Holmberg
- Tyler Holt
- Jay Hook
- Buck Hooker
- Bob Hooper
- Buster Hoover
- J. J. Hoover
- TJ Hopkins
- Norris Hopper
- Hanson Horsey
- Jeremy Horst
- Frank House
- Paul Householder
- Lefty Houtz
- Thomas Howard
- Dixie Howell (C)
- Dixie Howell (P)
- Jay Howell
- Dummy Hoy
- John Hudek
- Jimmy Hudgens
- Luke Hudson
- Miller Huggins
- Jared Hughes
- Keith Hughes
- Tommy Hughes
- Emil Huhn
- Rudy Hulswitt
- Tom Hume
- Tim Hummel
- Bert Humphries
- Ken Hunt
- Brian Hunter (1B)
- Brian Hunter (OF)
- Eddie Hunter
- Clint Hurdle
- Jerry Hurley
- Jacob Hurtubise
- Johnny Hutchings
- Mark Hutton

== I ==
- José Iglesias
- Raisel Iglesias
- Jonathan India
- Bob Ingersoll
- Bert Inks
- Bill Irwin
- Charlie Irwin
- Hernan Iribarren
- César Izturis

== J ==
- Ray Jablonski
- Al Jackson
- Damian Jackson
- Danny Jackson
- Mike Jackson
- Art Jacobs
- Larry Jacobus
- Charlie James
- Travis Jankowski
- Paul Janish
- Larry Jansen
- Kevin Jarvis
- Julián Javier
- Joey Jay
- Hal Jeffcoat
- Reggie Jefferson
- Stan Jefferson
- Robin Jennings
- D'Angelo Jiménez
- Connor Joe
- Ollie Johns
- Alex Johnson
- Bob Johnson
- Brian Johnson
- Chief Johnson
- Darrell Johnson
- Deron Johnson
- Hank Johnson
- Jason Johnson
- Ken Johnson
- Si Johnson
- Syl Johnson
- Doc Johnston
- Bumpus Jones
- Charley Jones
- Chris Jones
- Jeff Jones
- Mack Jones
- Sherman Jones
- Todd Jones
- Tracy Jones
- Willie Jones
- Nate Jones
- Eddie Joost
- Buck Jordan
- Levi Jordan
- Niles Jordan
- Ricardo Jordan
- Pinky Jorgensen
- Ryan Jorgensen
- Frank Jude
- Howie Judson
- Jakob Junis
- Joe Just
- Herb Juul

== K ==
- Mike Kahoe
- Jeff Kaiser
- Alex Kampouris
- John Kane
- Heinie Kappel
- Ricky Karcher
- Ed Karger
- Eddie Kasko
- Bob Katz
- Eddie Kazak
- Austin Kearns
- Cactus Keck
- Bobby Keefe
- Jim Keenan
- Randy Keisler
- Frankie Kelleher
- **Joe Kelley**
- Alex Kellner
- Bill Kellogg
- Win Kellum
- Bob Kelly
- Casey Kelly
- **George Kelly**
- Kenny Kelly
- Mike Kelly
- Roberto Kelly
- Bill Kelso
- Rudy Kemmler
- Dutch Kemner
- Matt Kemp
- Bill Kennedy
- Junior Kennedy
- Vern Kennedy
- Brett Kennedy
- Marty Keough
- Jeff Keppinger
- Jim Kern
- Dan Kerwin
- Keith Kessinger
- Brooks Kieschnick
- Red Killefer
- Sun-Woo Kim
- Wally Kimmick
- Clyde King
- Hal King
- Silver King
- Ed Kippert
- Clay Kirby
- Patrick Kivlehan
- Bobby Klaus
- Ollie Klee
- Ted Kleinhans
- Johnny Kling
- Scott Klingenbeck
- Johnny Klippstein
- Ted Kluszewski
- Frank Knauss
- Elmer Knetzer
- Alan Knicely
- Joe Knight
- Ray Knight
- Pete Knisely
- Brian Koelling
- Mark Koenig
- Elmer Koestner
- Ray Kolp
- Paul Konerko
- Mike Konnick
- Jim Konstanty
- Larry Kopf
- Andy Kosco
- Mike Kosman
- Ernie Koy
- Charlie Krause
- Evan Kravetz
- Wayne Krenchicki
- Chuck Kress
- Rick Krivda
- Marc Kroon
- Ernie Krueger
- Art Kruger
- Bill Kuehne
- Joel Kuhnel
- Andy Kyle

== L ==
- Joe La Sorsa
- Mike LaCoss
- Al Lakeman
- Ray Lamanno
- Clayton Lambert
- Pete Lamer
- Ryan LaMarre
- John Lamb
- Rafael Landestoy
- Hobie Landrith
- Bill Landrum
- Jerry Lane
- Don Lang
- Paul LaPalme
- Andy Larkin
- **Barry Larkin**
- Stephen Larkin
- Harry LaRoss
- Brandon Larson
- Jason LaRue
- Arlie Latham
- Mat Latos
- Ryan Lavarnway
- Derek Law
- Garland Lawing
- Tom Lawless
- Brooks Lawrence
- Tim Layana
- Tommy Leach
- Mike Leake
- King Lear
- Frank Leary
- Tim Leary
- Sam LeCure
- Bob Lee
- Cliff Lee
- Terry Lee
- Justin Lehr
- Casey Legumina
- Brandon Leibrandt
- Charlie Leibrandt
- George Lerchen
- Brad Lesley
- Darren Lewis
- Fred Lewis (2000s OF)
- Fred Lewis (1880s OF)
- Mark Lewis
- Richie Lewis
- Al Libke
- Cory Lidle
- Derek Lilliquist
- Mike Lincoln
- Jim Lindsey
- Johnny Lipon
- Hod Lisenbee
- Zack Littell
- Danny Litwhiler
- Buddy Lively
- Ben Lively
- Wes Livengood
- Bobby Livingston
- Paddy Livingston
- Hans Lobert
- Bobby Locke
- Gene Locklear
- Whitey Lockman
- Nick Lodolo
- Bob Logan
- Howard Lohr
- Bill Lohrman
- Kyle Lohse
- **Ernie Lombardi**
- Felipe López
- Luis López
- Pedro López
- Rahael Lopez
- Alejo Lopez
- Michael Lorenzen
- Baldy Louden
- Rhett Lowder
- George Lowe
- Turk Lown
- Peanuts Lowrey
- Red Lucas
- Ryan Ludwick
- Larry Luebbers
- Henry Luff
- Eddie Lukon
- Mike Lum
- Dolf Luque
- Red Lutz
- Gavin Lux
- Jerry Lynch
- Curt Lyons

== M ==
- Bob Mabe
- Danny MacFayden
- Anderson Machado
- Scott MacRae
- Jimmy Macullar
- Scotti Madison
- Lee Magee
- Sherry Magee
- Matt Magill
- George Magoon
- Tyler Mahle
- Rick Mahler
- Dan Mahoney
- Danny Mahoney
- Luke Maile
- Gary Majewski
- Bob Malloy
- Billy Maloney
- Jim Maloney
- Matt Maloney
- Clyde Manion
- Les Mann
- Tom Mansell
- Robert Manuel
- Josías Manzanillo
- Cliff Markle
- **Rube Marquard**
- Bob Marquis
- Jason Marquis
- Lefty Marr
- Armando Marsans
- Bill Marshall
- Max Marshall
- Sean Marshall
- Willard Marshall
- Noelvi Marte
- Barney Martin
- Billy Martin
- Carmelo Martínez
- Dave Martinez
- Nick Martinez
- Pedro A. Martínez
- Nick Martini
- Michael Mariot
- Clyde Mashore
- Leech Maskrey
- Del Mason
- Nick Masset
- Bill Massey
- Rubén Mateo
- **Christy Mathewson**
- Ryan Mattheus
- Mike Matthews
- Bobby Mattick
- Zach Maxwell
- Jakie May
- Lee May
- Carl Mays
- Joe Mays
- Marcus McBeth
- Algie McBride
- Swat McCabe
- William McCaffrey
- Bill McCarthy
- Jack McCarthy
- Tom McCarthy
- Lloyd McClendon
- Harry McCluskey
- Billy McCool
- Frank McCormick
- Harry McCormick
- Mike McCormick
- Barney McCosky
- Quinton McCracken
- Harry McCurdy
- Darnell McDonald
- Tex McDonald
- Chuck McElroy
- Will McEnaney
- Barney McFadden
- Herm McFarland
- Andy McGaffigan
- Willie McGill
- Bill McGilvray
- Dan McGinn
- Jumbo McGinnis
- Jim McGlothlin
- Howard McGraner
- Terry McGriff
- Deck McGuire
- Harry McIntire
- **Bill McKechnie**
- Limb McKenry
- Larry McKeon
- Matt McLain
- Kid McLaughlin
- Larry McLean
- Cal McLish
- Joe McManus
- Roy McMillan
- Tommy McMillan
- Hugh McMullen
- **Bid McPhee**
- Herb McQuaid
- Mike McQueen
- George McQuillan
- George McQuinn
- Hal McRae
- Doug McWeeny
- Rufus Meadows
- George Meakim
- Ray Medeiros
- Roy Meeker
- Sammy Meeks
- Bob Meinke
- Karl Meister
- Sam Mejías
- Dutch Mele
- Sam Mele
- Keury Mella
- Tim Melville
- Tony Menéndez
- Denis Menke
- Héctor Mercado
- Kent Mercker
- Lloyd Merriman
- Bill Merritt
- Jim Merritt
- Steve Mesner
- Devin Mesoraco
- Bob Meusel
- Luis Mey
- Russ Meyer
- Chris Michalak
- Ezra Midkiff
- Eddie Miksis
- Wade Miley
- Bob Miller
- Corky Miller
- Doc Miller
- Dusty Miller
- Eddie Miller
- George Miller
- Ward Miller
- Alec Mills
- Randy Milligan
- Eddie Milner
- Eric Milton
- Cotton Minahan
- Rudy Minarcin
- Gino Minutelli
- Clarence Mitchell
- Keith Mitchell
- Kevin Mitchell
- Mike Mitchell
- Roy Mitchell
- Mike Modak
- Brian Moehler
- Chad Moeller
- Sam Moll
- Fritz Mollwitz
- Frankie Montas
- Jeff Montgomery
- Dee Moore
- Gene Moore (OF)
- Gene Moore (P)
- Johnny Moore
- Marcus Moore
- Whitey Moore
- Jake Mooty
- Herbie Moran
- Danny Morejón
- Dauri Moreta
- Cy Morgan
- **Joe Morgan**
- Mike Morgan
- Bill Moriarty
- Hal Morris
- AJ Morris
- Jack Morrissey
- JoJo Morrissey
- Jon Moscot
- Earl Moseley
- Arnie Moser
- Paul Moskau
- Howie Moss
- Chad Mottola
- Frank Motz
- Bill Mountjoy
- Mike Moustakas
- Mike Mowrey
- Ray Mueller
- Tony Mullane
- Connie Murphy
- Dick Murphy
- Joe Murphy
- Morgan Murphy
- Rob Murphy
- Dale Murray
- Billy Myers
- Dane Myers
- Hy Myers
- Randy Myers
- Wil Myers
- Aaron Myette

== N ==
- Pete Naktenis
- Buddy Napier
- Tyler Naquin
- Dioner Navarro
- Denny Neagle
- Charlie Neal
- Greasy Neale
- Kristopher Negron
- Art Nehf
- Emmett Nelson
- Red Nelson
- Roger Nelson
- Ernie Nevel
- Don Newcombe
- Kevin Newman
- Doc Newton
- Chet Nichols Jr.
- Chris Nichting
- Hugh Nicol
- Al Niehaus
- Bert Niehoff
- Jack Niemes
- Melvin Nieves
- Johnny Niggeling
- C. J. Nitkowski
- Laynce Nix
- Paul Noce
- Gary Nolan
- Joe Nolan
- John Noriega
- Fred Norman
- Hub Northen
- Ron Northey
- Phil Norton
- Don Nottebart
- Howie Nunn
- Jon Nunnally
- Joe Nuxhall

== O ==
- Mike O'Berry
- Pete O'Brien
- Riley O'Brien
- Jack O'Connor
- Bob O'Farrell
- Brian O'Grady
- Ross Ohlendorf
- Mike O'Neill
- Paul O'Neill
- Peaches O'Neill
- Tip O'Neill
- Josh Osich
- Jim O'Toole
- Marty O'Toole
- Rebel Oakes
- Alex Ochoa
- Fred Odwell
- Ron Oester
- Jack Ogden
- John Oldham
- Joe Oliver
- Ray Olmedo
- Ivy Olson
- Logan Ondrusek
- Ramón Ortiz
- Pat Osburn
- Claude Osteen
- Darrell Osteen
- Jimmy Outlaw
- Orval Overall
- Connor Overton
- Bob Owchinko
- Eric Owens
- Jim Owens
- Micah Owings

== P ==
- Jordan Pacheco
- Pat Pacillo
- Gene Packard
- Juan Padilla
- Emilio Pagan
- Stan Palys
- Milt Pappas
- Kelly Paris
- Dave Parker
- Doc Parker
- Manny Parra
- Steve Parris
- Tom Parrott
- Camilo Pascual
- Dode Paskert
- Frank Pastore
- Clare Patterson
- Corey Patterson
- Xavier Paul
- Si Pauxtis
- Don Pavletich
- Mark Payton
- Bunny Pearce
- Jim Pearce
- Monte Pearson
- George Pechiney
- Steve Pegues
- Heinie Peitz
- Eddie Pellagrini
- Brayan Peña
- José Peña
- Orlando Peña
- Wily Mo Peña
- Jim Pendleton
- Terry Pendleton
- Brad Pennington
- Cliff Pennington
- Jimmy Peoples
- Jose Peraza
- Wandy Peralta
- Eduardo Pérez
- Miguel Pérez
- **Tony Pérez**
- Cionel Perez
- Harry Perkowski
- Pat Perry
- Scott Perry
- Roberto Petagine
- Kent Peterson
- Ted Petoskey
- Charlie Petty
- Chase Petty
- Adam Pettyjohn
- Bill Pfann
- Tommy Pham
- Art Phelan
- Ed Phelps
- Andy Phillips
- Bill Phillips
- Brandon Phillips
- Damon Phillips
- Connor Phillips
- Denis Phipps
- Val Picinich
- Eddie Pick
- Calvin Pickering
- Mario Picone
- Chris Piersoll
- Tony Piet
- Herman Pillette
- Luis Pineda
- Babe Pinelli
- Vada Pinson
- Wally Pipp
- Pinky Pittenger
- Bill Plummer
- Bud Podbielan
- Hugh Poland
- Ken Polivka
- Harlin Pool
- Ed Poole
- Mark Portugal
- Wally Post
- Abner Powell
- Bill Powell
- Ross Powell
- Ted Power
- John Powers
- Phil Powers
- Johnny Pramesa
- Joe Price
- Eddie Priest
- Doc Prothro
- Bill Prough
- Tim Pugh
- Yasiel Puig
- Charlie Puleo
- Pid Purdy
- Bob Purkey
- Harlan Pyle

== Q ==
- Kevin Quackenbush
- Mel Queen
- Jack Quinn
- Joe Quinn
- Luis Quiñones

== R ==
- Charlie Rabe
- Marv Rackley
- **Charles Radbourn**
- Ken Raffensberger
- Pat Ragan
- Rip Ragan
- Tanner Rainey
- Elizardo Ramírez
- JC Ramerez
- Ramón Ramírez
- Brooks Raley
- Chucho Ramos
- Henry Ramos
- Pedro Ramos
- Willie Ramsdell
- Joe Randa
- Scott Randall
- Bill Rariden
- Dennis Rasmussen
- Morrie Rath
- Johnny Rawlings
- Jeff Reardon
- Jeremiah Reardon
- Todd Redmond
- Gary Redus
- Jeff Reed
- Rick Reed
- Cody Reed
- Icicle Reeder
- Pokey Reese
- Mike Regan
- Wally Rehg
- John Reilly
- Chad Reineke
- Brian Reith
- Chris Reitsma
- Mike Remlinger
- Tony Renda
- Hunter Renfroe
- Édgar Rentería
- Merv Rettenmund
- George Rettger
- Jerry Reuss
- Dennys Reyes
- Jesús Reyes
- Greg Reynolds
- Billy Rhines
- Arthur Rhodes
- Charlie Rhodes
- Dennis Ribant
- Harry Rice
- Len Rice
- Danny Richar
- Duane Richards
- Jeff Richardson
- Lyon Richardson
- Nolen Richardson
- Beryl Richmond
- Lee Richmond
- Marv Rickert
- Harry Riconda
- Elmer Riddle
- Johnny Riddle
- Steve Ridzik
- John Riedling
- Lew Riggs
- José Rijo
- Jimmy Ring
- Edwin Rios
- Jimmy Ripple
- Claude Ritchey
- Jay Ritchie
- Rubén Rivera
- **Eppa Rixey**
- Johnny Rizzo
- Tanner Roark
- Tony Robello
- Bip Roberts
- Dick Robertson
- Chuckie Robinson
- Derrick Robinson
- Floyd Robinson
- **Frank Robinson**
- Kerry Robinson
- Rabbit Robinson
- Ron Robinson
- Bill Rodgers
- Félix Rodríguez
- Frank Rodriguez
- Héctor Rodríguez
- Henry Rodríguez
- Rosario Rodríguez
- Yorman Rodríguez
- Josh Roenicke
- Ron Roenicke
- Mike Roesler
- Wally Roettger
- Taylor Rogers
- Clint Rogge
- Cookie Rojas
- Scott Rolen
- Jason Romano
- Sal Romano
- Rolando Roomes
- John Roper
- Adam Rosales
- Amed Rosario
- Pete Rose
- Pete Rose Jr.
- Cliff Ross
- Cody Ross
- Dave Ross
- Joe Rossi
- Frank Roth
- **Edd Roush**
- Jack Rowan
- Wade Rowdon
- Sonny Ruberto
- Don Rudolph
- Dutch Ruether
- Johnny Ruffin
- Chico Ruiz
- Tom Runnells
- **Amos Rusie**
- Scott Ruskin
- Jeff Russell
- B. J. Ryan
- Connie Ryan

== S ==
- Kirk Saarloos
- Chris Sabo
- Donnie Sadler
- Eduardo Salazar
- Roger Salkeld
- Slim Sallee
- Brad Salmon
- Keyvius Sampson
- Juan Samuel
- Jesús Sánchez
- Raúl Sánchez
- Gus Sandberg
- Deion Sanders
- Reggie Sanders
- Roy Sanders
- Mo Sanford
- Reiver Sanmartin
- Benito Santiago
- Ramón Santiago
- Tony Santillan
- Rafael Santo Domingo
- Víctor Santos
- Dave Sappelt
- Dane Sardinha
- Manny Sarmiento
- Hank Sauer
- Ted Savage
- Ralph Savidge
- Moe Savransky
- Pat Scantlebury
- Les Scarsella
- Jimmie Schaffer
- Scott Schebler
- Bob Scheffing
- Richie Scheinblum
- Bill Scherrer
- Admiral Schlei
- Bob Schmidt
- Willard Schmidt
- Johnny Schmitz
- Pete Schneider
- Karl Schnell
- Scott Schoeneweis
- Gene Schott
- Pete Schourek
- Barney Schreiber
- Hank Schreiber
- Pop Schriver
- Max Schrock
- Wes Schulmerich
- Art Schult
- Howie Schultz
- Joe Schultz
- Mike Schultz
- Al Schulz
- Skip Schumaker
- Dick Scott
- Donnie Scott
- Ed Scott
- Everett Scott
- Jack Scott
- Scott Scudder
- **Tom Seaver**
- Bob Sebra
- Jimmy Sebring
- Frank Secory
- Charlie See
- Kip Selbach
- Bill Selby
- Steve Selsky
- Andy Seminick
- Alfredo Simon
- Lucas Sims
- Nick Senzel
- Billy Serad
- Dan Serafini
- Scott Service
- Hank Severeid
- Chris Sexton
- Socks Seybold
- Cy Seymour
- Brian Shackelford
- Kevin Shackelford
- Gus Shallix
- Art Shamsky
- Wally Shaner
- Joe Shaute
- Jeff Shaw
- Mike Shea
- Dave Shean
- Tom Shearn
- Jimmy Sheckard
- Tom Sheehan
- Jimmy Shevlin
- Chasen Shreve
- Bob Shirley
- Ivey Shiver
- Milt Shoffner
- Eddie Shokes
- Bill Short
- Chick Shorten
- Clyde Shoun
- Michael Siani
- Ed Sicking
- Johnny Siegle
- Candy Sierra
- Rubén Sierra
- Frank Sigafoos
- José Silva
- Al Silvera
- **Al Simmons**
- Alfredo Simón
- Allan Simpson
- Dick Simpson
- Wayne Simpson
- Bert Sincock
- Brady Singer
- Dick Sipek
- Dave Sisler
- Dick Sisler
- Dave Skaugstad
- Bob Skinner
- Gordon Slade
- Walt Slagle
- Austin Slater
- Mike Slattery
- John Smiley
- Bob Smith
- Chick Smith
- Dominic Smith
- Elmer Smith (1886–1900)
- Elmer Smith (1925)
- Frank Smith (1911–1912)
- Frank Smith (1950–1956)
- Fred Smith
- George Smith
- Germany Smith
- Hal Smith
- Harry Smith
- Jimmy Smith
- Jordan Smith
- Jud Smith
- **Lee Smith**
- Mike Smith
- Milt Smith
- Paul Smith
- Pete Smith
- Willie Smith
- Josh A. Smith
- Stephen Smitherman
- Homer Smoot
- Van Snider
- Pop Snyder
- Joe Sommer
- Layne Somsen
- Livan Soto
- Mario Soto
- Bob Spade
- Daryl Spencer
- Harry Spies
- Carson Spiers
- Harry Spilman
- Jerry Spradlin
- Ed Sprague
- Brad Springer
- Russ Springer
- Randy St. Claire
- Larry Stahl
- Jerry Staley
- Virgil Stallcup
- Oscar Stanage
- Jason Standridge
- Mike Stanton
- Ray Starr
- Dan Stearns
- Spencer Steer
- Justin Stein
- Harry Steinfeldt
- Dernell Stenson
- Jake Stenzel
- Ben Stephens
- Jackson Stephens
- Clarence Stephens
- Robert Stephenson
- Tyler Stephenson
- Jimmy Stewart
- Mark Stewart
- Sal Stewart
- Kurt Stillwell
- Archie Stimmel
- Lee Stine
- Kelly Stinnett
- Ricky Stone
- Rocky Stone
- Drew Storen
- Levi Stoudt
- Allyn Stout
- Dan Straily
- Gabby Street
- Ed Strelecki
- Joe Stripp
- Pedro Strop
- Drew Stubbs
- John Stuper
- Lena Styles
- Chris Stynes
- Eugenio Suarez
- George Suggs
- Clyde Sukeforth
- Billy Sullivan Jr.
- Mike Sullivan
- Scott Sullivan
- Tom Sullivan
- Champ Summers
- Glenn Sutko
- Jack Sutthoff
- Drew Sutton
- Brent Suter
- Evar Swanson
- Monty Swartz
- Mark Sweeney
- Greg Swindell
- Len Swormstedt
- Lou Sylvester
- Joe Szekely

== T ==
- Jeff Tabaka
- Jesse Tannehill
- Ted Tappe
- Tony Tarasco
- Craig Tatum
- Tommy Tatum
- Eddie Taubensee
- Willy Taveras
- Ben Taylor
- Jack Taylor
- Joe Taylor
- Reggie Taylor
- Sammy Taylor
- George Tebeau
- Kent Tekulve
- Johnny Temple
- Scott Terry
- Jack Theis
- Tommy Thevenow
- Henry Thielman
- Frank Thomas
- Bubba Thompson
- Daryl Thompson
- Junior Thompson
- Tug Thompson
- Tyler Thornburg
- Jim Thorpe
- Bob Thurman
- Jay Tibbs
- Eddie Tiemeyer
- Bill Tierney
- Ozzie Timmons
- **Joe Tinker**
- Eric Tipton
- Bobby Tolan
- Freddie Toliver
- Brett Tomko
- Dave Tomlin
- Chuck Tompkins
- Fred Toney
- Ángel Torres
- Bill Tozer
- Bill Traffley
- Blake Trahan
- Jeff Treadway
- Alex Treviño
- Jose Trevino
- Manny Trillo
- John Tsitouris
- Greg Tubbs
- Michael Tucker
- Preston Tucker
- Jim Turner
- Stuart Turner
- Twink Twining
- George Twombly

== U ==
- Ted Uhlaender
- Maury Uhler
- George Ulrich
- Al Unser
- Bob Usher

== V ==
- Mike Vail
- Chris Valaika
- Wilson Valdez
- Eric Valent
- Javier Valentín
- Corky Valentine
- Joe Valentine
- Dave Van Gorder
- Todd Van Poppel
- **Dazzy Vance**
- Johnny Vander Meer
- John Vander Wal
- Josh VanMeter
- Gary Varsho
- Farmer Vaughn
- Greg Vaughn
- Max Venable
- Lee Viau
- Rube Vickers
- Ryan Vilade
- Pedro Villarreal
- Ron Villone
- Zach Vincej
- Frank Viola
- Pedro Viola
- Clyde Vollmer
- Edinson Vólquez
- Jake Volz
- Fritz Von Kolnitz
- Jason Vosler
- Joey Votto
- Rip Vowinkel
- John Vukovich

== W ==
- Kyle Waldrop
- Joe Wagner
- Ryan Wagner
- Kermit Wahl
- Curt Walker
- Duane Walker
- Gee Walker
- Harry Walker
- Hub Walker
- Mysterious Walker
- Todd Walker
- Tom Walker
- Lee Walls
- Chad Wallach
- Bucky Walters
- Ken Walters
- Jerome Walton
- **Lloyd Waner**
- Pee-Wee Wanninger
- Jay Ward
- Piggy Ward
- Ray Washburn
- Pat Watkins
- Brandon Watson
- Mark Watson
- Mother Watson
- David Weathers
- Jim Weaver
- Luke Weaver
- Ben Weber
- Herm Wehmeier
- Podge Weihe
- Jake Weimer
- Phil Weintraub
- Zack Weiss
- Curt Welch
- David Wells
- Kip Wells
- Chris Welsh
- Billy Werber
- Don Werner
- Buck West
- Dick West
- Max West
- Wally Westlake
- Gus Weyhing
- John Weyhing
- George Wheeler
- Harry Wheeler
- Pete Whisenant
- Gabe White
- Jack White
- Jo-Jo White
- Rick White
- Will White
- Fred Whitfield
- Bill Whitrock
- Kevin Wickander
- Bob Wicker
- Al Wickland
- Wild Bill Widner
- Ted Wieand
- Joey Wiemer
- Jimmy Wiggs
- Bill Wight
- Milt Wilcox
- Mason Williams
- Dallas Williams
- Dave Williams
- Denny Williams
- Dewey Williams
- Frank Williams
- Ken Williams
- Todd Williams
- Woody Williams
- Brandon Williamson
- Scott Williamson
- Carl Willis
- Dontrelle Willis
- Ted Wills
- Dan Wilson
- Jimmie Wilson
- Nigel Wilson
- Paul Wilson
- Justin Wilson
- Scott Winchester
- Ivey Wingo
- Jesse Winker
- Herm Winningham
- DeWayne Wise
- Matt Wisler
- Whitey Wistert
- Mark Wohlers
- Ray Wolf
- Harry Wolter
- Tony Womack
- Jake Wong
- Bob Wood
- George Wood
- Harry Wood
- Jake Wood
- Blake Wood
- Travis Wood
- Alex Wood
- Sam Woodruff
- Woody Woodward
- Ralph Works
- Al Worthington
- Craig Worthington
- Jimmy Woulfe
- Asher Wojciechowski
- Daniel Wright
- Rick Wrona
- Johnny Wyrostek
- Biff Wysong
- Randy Wynne
- Austin Wynns

== X ==
- None

== Y ==
- Esteban Yan
- Earl Yingling
- Alex Young
- Babe Young
- Del Young
- Dmitri Young
- Eric Yang
- Pep Young
- Joel Youngblood

== Z ==
- Pat Zachry
- Paul Zahniser
- Dom Zanni
- T.J. Zeuch
- Benny Zientara
- Don Zimmer
- Jerry Zimmerman
- Billy Zitzmann
- Yosver Zulueta
- George Zuverink
