= 1914 Cincinnati Reds season =

1914 Cincinnati Reds
- League: National League
- Ballpark: Redland Field
- City: Cincinnati, Ohio
- Owners: Garry Herrmann
- Managers: Buck Herzog

The 1914 Cincinnati Reds season was a season in American baseball. The Cincinnati Reds finished last in the National League.

== Offseason ==
After the 1913 season, Reds owner Garry Herrmann, unhappy with the poor performance of the club, challenged his manager Joe Tinker on his managerial style and sought his resignation. Eventually, Herrmann and Tinker conferred, and in October, Tinker signed a contract to manage the team in 1914. Herrmann then fired Tinker in November, as Tinker complained that Herrmann did not seek his input on player transactions, while Herrmann charged the Tinker did not accept his authority.

On December 12, the Reds acquired Buck Herzog and Grover Hartley from the New York Giants in exchange for Bob Bescher. Herzog, a shortstop, hit .286 with three home runs and 31 RBI in 96 games in 1913, while Hartley saw limited time as a backup catcher with the Giants in 1913, batting .316 in 23 games. The Reds then named Herzog as player-manager of the club, as this would be his first managerial job.

With the Federal League beginning play in the 1914 season, a number of Reds players jumped to the new league. Notable players that left Cincinnati were Dave Davenport, Mordecai Brown, Harry Chapman, and Armando Marsans to the St. Louis Terriers, Chief Johnson to the Kansas City Packers and George Suggs to the Baltimore Terrapins.

== Regular season ==
Dick Hoblitzell, the Reds starting first baseman since 1909, struggled badly in the 1914 season, and was eventually placed on waivers, as the Boston Red Sox picked him up on July 16. Hoblitzell was hitting only .210 with no home runs and 26 RBI in 78 games, well below his career numbers.

Offensively, the Reds struggled during the 1914 season, batting only .236, seventh in the National League. The club had a league low 142 doubles and 16 home runs. Heinie Groh led the team with a .288 batting average, and had two home runs and 32 RBI in 139 games. Player-manager Buck Herzog batted .281 with one home run and 40 RBI with a team high 46 stolen bases in 138 games in his first season in Cincinnati. Bert Niehoff led the Reds with four home runs and 49 RBI, while batting .242.

The pitching staff was led by Red Ames, who had a 15-21 record with a 2.64 ERA in 47 games. He pitched a team high 297 innings and had 128 strikeouts and 18 complete games. Rube Benton led the club in wins, as he had a 16-18 record with a 2.96 ERA in 41 games. Phil Douglas, in his first full season as a starting pitcher, had a team best 2.56 ERA in 45 games, starting 25 of them. Douglas had a record of 11-18 and pitched 239.1 innings.

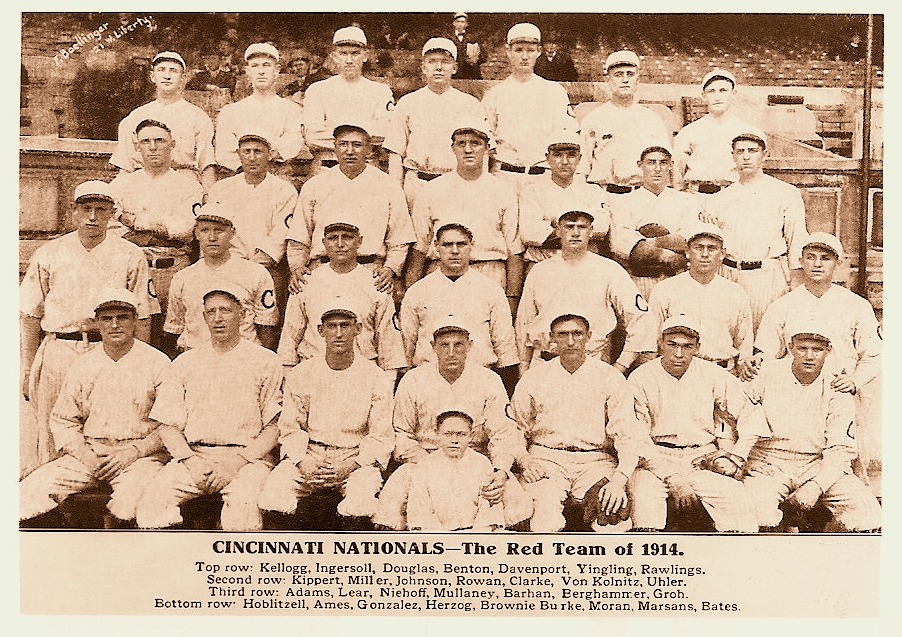
The 1914 Cincinnati Reds

=== Season summary ===
Cincinnati was an early season surprise, as many expected the club to struggle after losing some top players to the Federal League, and by losing player-manager Joe Tinker. An early season six game winning streak lifted the Reds to a 16-11 record, which put them in second place in the National League, only one game behind the Pittsburgh Pirates. The Reds continued to play excellent baseball, and on June 1, after winning their eighth straight game, the Reds were tied with the New York Giants for first place in the league with a 26-15 record. The club would then struggle badly, going 14-33 in their next 47 games to fall out of the pennant race.

The Reds continued to struggle, and won only six of their last 40 games, to close the season with a 60-94 record, last place in the National League and 34.5 games behind the first place Boston Braves. The 60 wins and .390 winning percentage was the lowest by the club since the 1901 season. The total attendance of 100,791 was the lowest total since the 1891 season.

=== Season standings ===
National League
Team	W	L	Pct.	GB	Home	Road
Boston Braves	94	59	.614	—	51‍–‍25	43‍–‍34
New York Giants	84	70	.545	10½	43‍–‍36	41‍–‍34
St. Louis Cardinals	81	72	.529	13	42‍–‍34	39‍–‍38
Chicago Cubs	78	76	.506	16½	46‍–‍30	32‍–‍46
Brooklyn Robins	75	79	.487	19½	45‍–‍34	30‍–‍45
Philadelphia Phillies	74	80	.481	20½	48‍–‍30	26‍–‍50
Pittsburgh Pirates	69	85	.448	25½	39‍–‍36	30‍–‍49
Cincinnati Reds	60	94	.390	34½	34‍–‍42	26‍–‍52

=== Record vs. opponents ===
1914 National League record Sources:
Team	BSN	BRO	CHC	CIN	NYG	PHI	PIT	STL
Boston	—	9–13	16–6	14–8–2	11–11–1	12–10	17–5–1	15–6–1
Brooklyn	13–9	—	10–12	11–11	9–13	11–11	16–6	5–17
Chicago	6–16	12–10	—	17–5	9–13	12–10	12–10	10–12–2
Cincinnati	8–14–2	11–11	5–17	—	9–13	9–13	8–14–1	10–12
New York	11–11–1	13–9	13–9	13–9	—	12–10	13–9–1	9–13
Philadelphia	10–12	11–11	10–12	13–9	10–12	—	12–10	8–14
Pittsburgh	5–17–1	6–16	10–12	14–8–1	9–13–1	10–12	—	15–7–1
St. Louis	6–15–1	17–5	12–10–2	12–10	13–9	14–8	7–15–1	—

=== Notable transactions ===
- April 20, 1914: Chief Johnson jumped from the Reds to the Kansas City Packers.

=== Roster ===
1914 Cincinnati Reds
Roster
Pitchers: Karl Adams; Red Ames; Rube Benton; Dave Davenport; Phil Douglas; Pete Fahrer; Paul Fittery; Pat Griffin; Bob Ingersoll; Chief Johnson; Elmer Koestner; King Lear; Jack Rowan; Pete Schneider; Earl Yingling	Catchers: Tommy Clarke; Tex Erwin; Norm Glockson; Mike González; Infielders: Marty Berghammer; Claud Derrick; Tiny Graham; Heinie Groh; Buck Herzog; Bill Kellogg; Fritz Mollwitz; Bert Niehoff; Johnny Rawlings; Fritz Von Kolnitz	Outfielders: Johnny Bates; Bert Daniels; Bill Holden; Red Killefer; Ed Kippert; Harry LaRoss; Howard Lohr; Armando Marsans; Kid McLaughlin; Doc Miller; Herbie Moran; George Twombly; Maury Uhler	Manager: Buck Herzog

== Player stats ==
=== Batting ===
==== Starters by position ====
Note: Pos = Position; G = Games played; AB = At bats; H = Hits; Avg. = Batting average; HR = Home runs; RBI = Runs batted in

Pos	Player	G	AB	H	Avg.	HR	RBI
C	Tommy Clarke	113	313	82	.262	2	25
1B	Dick Hoblitzell	78	248	52	.210	0	26
2B	Heinie Groh	139	455	131	.288	2	32
SS	Buck Herzog	138	498	140	.281	1	40
3B	Bert Niehoff	142	484	117	.242	4	49
OF	George Twombley	68	240	56	.233	0	19
OF	Herbie Moran	107	395	93	.235	1	35
OF	Bert Daniels	71	269	59	.219	0	19

==== Other batters ====
Note: G = Games played; AB = At bats; H = Hits; Avg. = Batting average; HR = Home runs; RBI = Runs batted in

Player	G	AB	H	Avg.	HR	RBI
Doc Miller	93	192	49	.255	0	33
Mike González	95	176	41	.233	0	10
Johnny Bates	58	155	39	.252	2	15
Red Killefer	42	141	39	.277	0	12
Bill Kellogg	71	126	22	.175	0	7
Armando Marsans	36	124	37	.298	0	22
Marty Berghammer	77	112	25	.223	0	6
Fritz Mollwitz	32	111	18	.162	0	5
Fritz Von Kolnitz	41	104	23	.221	0	6
Tiny Graham	25	61	14	.230	0	3
Johnny Rawlings	33	60	13	.217	0	8
Maury Uhler	46	56	12	.214	0	3
Harry LaRoss	22	48	11	.229	0	5
Howard Lohr	18	47	10	.213	0	7
Tex Erwin	12	35	11	.314	1	7
Bill Holden	11	28	6	.214	0	1
Norm Glockson	7	12	0	.000	0	0
Claud Derrick	3	6	2	.333	0	1
Ed Kippert	2	2	0	.000	0	0
Kid McLaughlin	3	2	0	.000	0	0

=== Pitching ===
==== Starting pitchers ====
Note: G = Games pitched; IP = Innings pitched; W = Wins; L = Losses; ERA = Earned run average; SO = Strikeouts

Player	G	IP	W	L	ERA	SO
Red Ames	47	297.0	15	23	2.64	128
Rube Benton	41	271.0	16	18	2.96	121
Earl Yingling	34	198.0	9	13	3.45	80
Chief Johnson	1	4.0	0	0	6.75	1

==== Other pitchers ====
Note: G = Games pitched; IP = Innings pitched; W = Wins; L = Losses; ERA = Earned run average; SO = Strikeouts

Player	G	IP	W	L	ERA	SO
Phil Douglas	45	239.1	11	18	2.56	121
Pete Schneider	29	144.1	5	13	2.81	62
King Lear	17	55.2	1	2	3.07	20
Dave Davenport	10	54.0	2	2	2.50	22
Paul Fittery	8	43.2	0	2	3.09	21
Elmer Koestner	5	18.1	0	0	4.42	6

==== Relief pitchers ====
Note: G = Games pitched; W = Wins; L = Losses; SV = Saves; ERA = Earned run average; SO = Strikeouts

Player	G	W	L	SV	ERA	SO
Jack Rowan	12	1	3	2	3.46	16
Pete Fahrer	5	0	0	0	1.13	2
Karl Adams	4	0	0	0	9.00	5
Bob Ingersoll	4	0	0	0	3.00	2
Pat Griffin	1	0	0	0	9.00	0
