= 1920 Cincinnati Reds season =

1920 Cincinnati Reds
- League: National League
- Ballpark: Redland Field
- City: Cincinnati, Ohio
- Owners: Garry Herrmann
- Managers: Pat Moran

The 1920 Cincinnati Reds season was a season in American baseball. The team finished third in the National League with a record of 82–71, 10½ games behind the Brooklyn Robins.

== Off-season ==
Following a very successful 1919 season, in which the Reds won the National League pennant and then defeated the Chicago White Sox in the 1919 World Series, the team had a very quiet off-season, with no notable transactions. After winning 96 games in 1919, expectations were high in Cincinnati that the club would contend for the pennant again in 1920.

== Regular season ==
Cincinnati started off the season strong, sweeping the Chicago Cubs in a three-game series to begin the season, and after 12 games, the club was in first place with a solid 9-3 record. The team ran into a bit of trouble throughout the month of May, going 10-12 over a 22-game span to drop their overall record to 19-15, as the Reds were battling the Pittsburgh Pirates, Chicago Cubs and Brooklyn Robins for first place.

The Reds remained in the hunt for the pennant throughout the month of June, and on June 30, the club had a 35-26 record, and a three-game lead over the second place Robins and Cubs. Throughout the summer and into September, the Reds, Robins and Cubs continued to battle in the pennant race, with Cincinnati holding a 1.5 game lead over Brooklyn after sweeping the St. Louis Cardinals in a double header on Labor Day. On September 5, the Reds lost starting pitcher Slim Sallee to the New York Giants on waivers.

Cincinnati struggled over their last 25 games of the season, earning a record of 8-17, and fell completely out of the pennant race. On October 2, the Reds and the Pittsburgh Pirates played in the last tripleheader to date and only one of the modern World Series era (post-1903) held at Forbes Field in Pittsburgh, with the Reds winning two of the games.

Overall, Cincinnati finished the season with a record of 82-71, placing in third in the National League, 10.5 games behind the Brooklyn Robins. This marked the fourth consecutive season the team finished with a winning record.

Outfielder Edd Roush had another excellent season, leading the Reds with a .339 batting average, four home runs, 90 RBI and 36 stolen bases in 149 games. First baseman Jake Daubert batted .304 with four home runs and 48 RBI in 142 games. Third baseman Heinie Groh hit .298 with 49 RBI in 145 games, while outfielder Pat Duncan had a solid .295 batting average with two home runs and 83 RBI in 154 games.

On the mound, Jimmy Ring led the pitching staff, as he finished with a 17-16 record with a 3.54 ERA in 42 games played. Ring led the club with 266.2 innings pitched. Dutch Ruether had another solid season, earning a record of 16-12 with a team best 2.47 ERA in 265.1 innings pitched over 37 games. Ruether also led the Reds with 23 complete games and 99 strikeouts.

Despite failing to qualify for the World Series, the Reds set a team record for attendance for the second consecutive season, with 568,107 fans attending games, an increase of over 30,000 fans over the 1919 season.

=== Season standings ===
National League
Team	W	L	Pct.	GB	Home	Road
Brooklyn Robins	93	61	.604	—	49‍–‍29	44‍–‍32
New York Giants	86	68	.558	7	45‍–‍35	41‍–‍33
Cincinnati Reds	82	71	.536	10½	42‍–‍34	40‍–‍37
Pittsburgh Pirates	79	75	.513	14	42‍–‍35	37‍–‍40
St. Louis Cardinals	75	79	.487	18	38‍–‍38	37‍–‍41
Chicago Cubs	75	79	.487	18	43‍–‍34	32‍–‍45
Boston Braves	62	90	.408	30	36‍–‍37	26‍–‍53
Philadelphia Phillies	62	91	.405	30½	32‍–‍45	30‍–‍46

=== Record vs. opponents ===
1920 National League record Sources:
Team	BSN	BRO	CHC	CIN	NYG	PHI	PIT	STL
Boston	—	8–14–1	7–15	9–12	10–12	10–11	7–15	11–11
Brooklyn	14–8–1	—	13–9	10–12	15–7	14–8	12–10	15–7
Chicago	15–7	9–13	—	9–13	7–15	14–8	11–11	10–12
Cincinnati	12–9	12–10	13–9	—	6–16–1	14–8	12–10	13–9
New York	12–10	7–15	15–7	16–6–1	—	12–10	13–9	11–11
Philadelphia	11–10	8–14	8–14	8–14	10–12	—	9–13	8–14
Pittsburgh	15–7	10–12	11–11	10–12	9–13	13–9	—	11–11–1
St. Louis	11–11	7–15	12–10	9–13	11–11	14–8	11–11–1	—

=== Roster ===
1920 Cincinnati Reds
Roster
Pitchers: Lynn Brenton; Rube Bressler; Fritz Coumbe; Hod Eller; Ray Fisher; George Lowe; Dolf Luque; Buddy Napier; Jimmy Ring; Dutch Ruether; Slim Sallee; Monty Swartz; Jack Theis	Catchers: Nick Allen; Bill Rariden; Ivey Wingo; Infielders: Sam Crane; Jake Daubert; Heinie Groh; Larry Kopf; Morrie Rath; Ed Sicking	Outfielders: Pat Duncan; Greasy Neale; Edd Roush; Charlie See	Manager: Pat Moran

== Player stats ==
= Indicates team leader

=== Batting ===
==== Starters by position ====
Note: Pos = Position; G = Games played; AB = At bats; H = Hits; Avg. = Batting average; HR = Home runs; RBI = Runs batted in

Pos	Player	G	AB	H	Avg.	HR	RBI
C	Ivey Wingo	108	364	96	.264	2	38
1B	Jake Daubert	142	553	168	.304	4	48
2B	Morrie Rath	129	506	135	.267	2	28
SS	Larry Kopf	126	458	112	.245	0	59
3B	Heinie Groh	145	550	164	.298	0	49
OF	Pat Duncan	154	576	170	.295	2	83
OF	Edd Roush	149	579	196	.339	4	90
OF	Greasy Neale	150	530	135	.255	3	46

==== Other batters ====
Note: G = Games played; AB = At bats; H = Hits; Avg. = Batting average; HR = Home runs; RBI = Runs batted in

Player	G	AB	H	Avg.	HR	RBI
Sam Crane	54	144	31	.215	0	9
Ed Sicking	37	123	33	.268	0	17
Bill Rariden	39	101	25	.248	0	10
Nick Allen	43	85	23	.271	0	4
Charlie See	47	82	25	.305	0	15
Rube Bressler	21	30	8	.267	0	3

=== Pitching ===
==== Starting pitchers ====
Note: G = Games pitched; IP = Innings pitched; W = Wins; L = Losses; ERA = Earned run average; SO = Strikeouts

Player	G	IP	W	L	ERA	SO
Jimmy Ring	42	266.2	17	16	3.54	73
Dutch Ruether	37	265.2	16	12	2.47	99
Monty Swartz	1	12.0	0	1	4.50	2

==== Other pitchers ====
Note: G = Games pitched; IP = Innings pitched; W = Wins; L = Losses; ERA = Earned run average; SO = Strikeouts

Player	G	IP	W	L	ERA	SO
Hod Eller	35	210.1	13	12	2.95	76
Dolf Luque	37	207.2	13	9	2.51	72
Ray Fisher	33	201.0	10	11	2.73	56
Slim Sallee	21	116.0	5	6	3.34	13
Buddy Napier	9	49.0	4	2	1.29	17
Rube Bressler	10	20.1	2	0	1.77	4
Lynn Brenton	5	18.1	2	1	4.91	13

==== Relief pitchers ====
Note: G = Games pitched; W = Wins; L = Losses; SV = Saves; ERA = Earned run average; SO = Strikeouts

Player	G	W	L	SV	ERA	SO
Fritz Coumbe	3	0	1	0	4.91	7
Charlie See	1	0	0	0	6.00	3
George Lowe	1	0	0	0	0.00	0
Jack Theis	1	0	0	0	0.00	0
