= Robert Ingersoll =

Robert or Bob Ingersoll may refer to:

- Bob Ingersoll (baseball) (1883–1927), American baseball player
- Bob Ingersoll (born 1952), American comic book writer and lawyer
- Robert G. Ingersoll (1833–1899), American politician and agnostic orator
- Robert H. Ingersoll (1859–1928), American businessman and producer of the first "Dollar Watch"
- Robert S. Ingersoll (1914–2010), American businessman and diplomat
- Robert Sturgis Ingersoll (1891–1973), president of Philadelphia Museum of Art from 1948 to 1964

== See also ==
- Robert Ingersoll Aitken (1878–1949), American sculptor
