= Babe Twombly =

American baseball player (1896–1974)

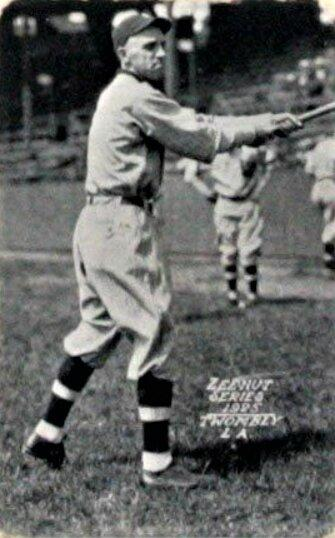
- Outfielder
- Born: January 18, 1896; Jamaica Plain, Massachusetts, U.S.
- Died: November 23, 1974 (aged 78); San Clemente, California, U.S.
- Batted: Left Threw: Right

MLB debut
- April 14, 1920, for the Chicago Cubs

Last MLB appearance
- October 2, 1921, for the Chicago Cubs

MLB statistics
- Batting average: .304
- Home runs: 3
- Runs batted in: 32
- Stats at Baseball Reference

Teams
- Chicago Cubs (1920–1921)

Clarence Edward "Babe" Twombly (January 18, 1896 – November 23, 1974) was an American professional baseball player who was an outfielder in the Major Leagues from 1920 to 1921. He played for the Chicago Cubs.

Babe was the younger brother of George Twombly who also played Major League Baseball.

Despite just 358 at bats at the Major League level with the Cubs, Babe had a career batting average of .304 and hit three big league home runs.
