= Matt Bowman =

American baseball player (born 1991)

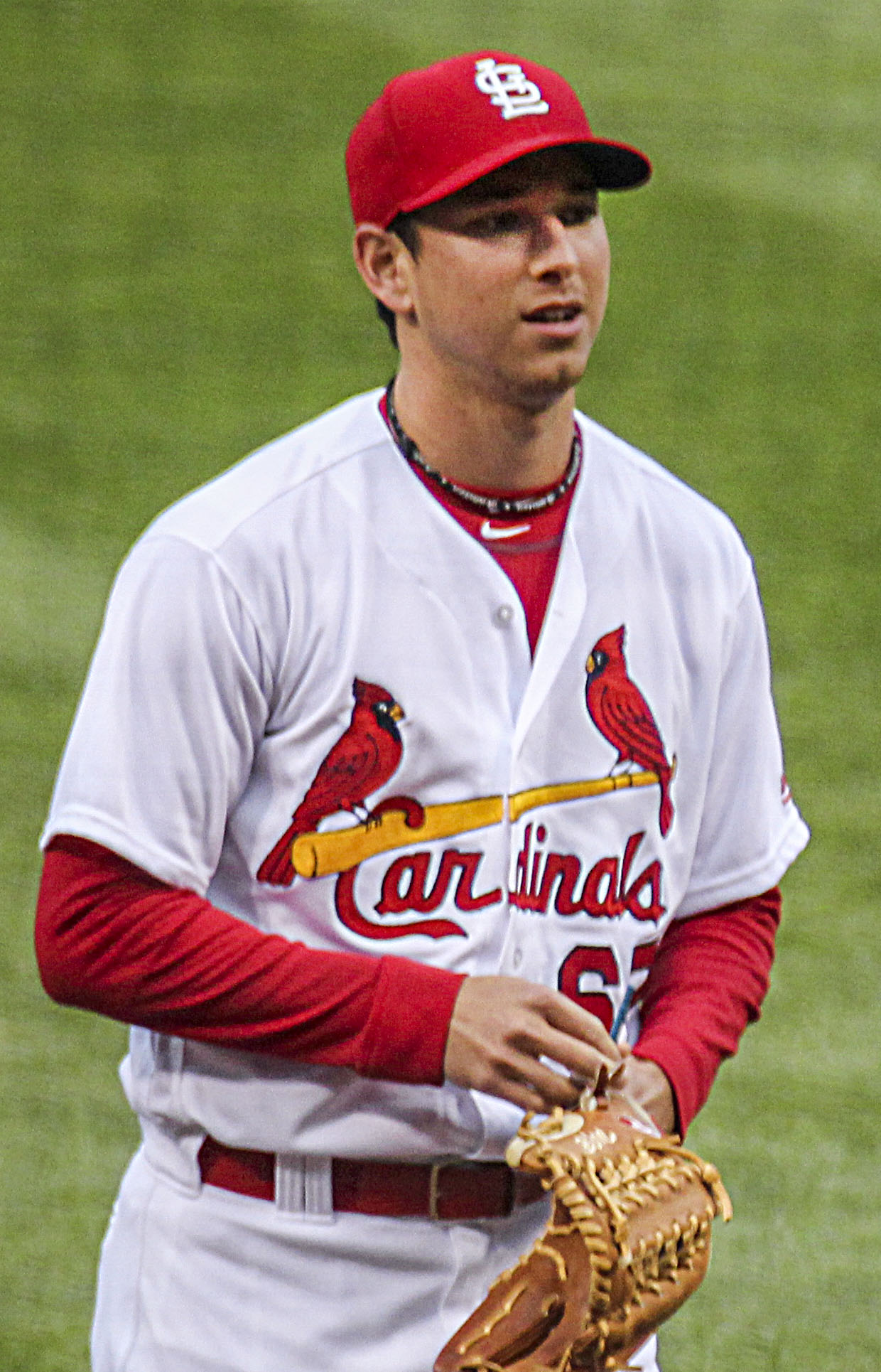
- Bowman with the St. Louis Cardinals

Free agent
- Pitcher
- Born: May 31, 1991 (age 35); Chevy Chase, Maryland, U.S.
- Bats: Right Throws: Right

MLB debut
- April 6, 2016, for the St. Louis Cardinals

MLB statistics (through 2025 season)
- Win–loss record: 8–14
- Earned run average: 4.38
- Strikeouts: 194
- Stats at Baseball Reference

Teams
- St. Louis Cardinals (2016–2018); Cincinnati Reds (2019); New York Yankees (2023); Minnesota Twins (2024); Arizona Diamondbacks (2024); Seattle Mariners (2024); Baltimore Orioles (2024–2025)

Matthew Chou Bowman (born May 31, 1991) is an American professional baseball pitcher who is a free agent. He has previously played in Major League Baseball (MLB) for the St. Louis Cardinals, Cincinnati Reds, New York Yankees, Minnesota Twins, Arizona Diamondbacks, Seattle Mariners, and Baltimore Orioles.

== High school and college ==
While growing up in Chevy Chase, Maryland, Bowman attended St. Albans School in Washington, D.C. As a senior he was All-Met Player of the Year and All-Conference as a shortstop and right-handed pitcher, and had a 0.70 ERA as a pitcher and a .419 average as a batter.

He played college baseball for the Princeton Tigers at Princeton University from 2010 to 2012. He was both a pitcher and shortstop for the Tigers. He had a low-90s fastball that ran as high as 95 mph, a hard slider, a curveball, and a changeup. He was second-team all-Ivy League at shortstop as a sophomore. In 2012, as a junior, he went 4–2 with a 4.66 ERA in nine starts along with batting .308 with one home run in 33 games. During the summers in college, he played shortstop for the Bethesda Big Train.

== Professional career ==
=== New York Mets ===
The New York Mets selected Bowman in the 13th round of the 2012 Major League Baseball draft. He made his professional debut that season for the Brooklyn Cyclones. He had a 2.45 earned run average (ERA) in 29 1/3 innings pitched. Bowman started 2013 with the Savannah Sand Gnats and was promoted to the St. Lucie Mets during the season. Over 21 starts he had a 10–4 win–loss record with a 3.05 ERA and 116 strikeouts.

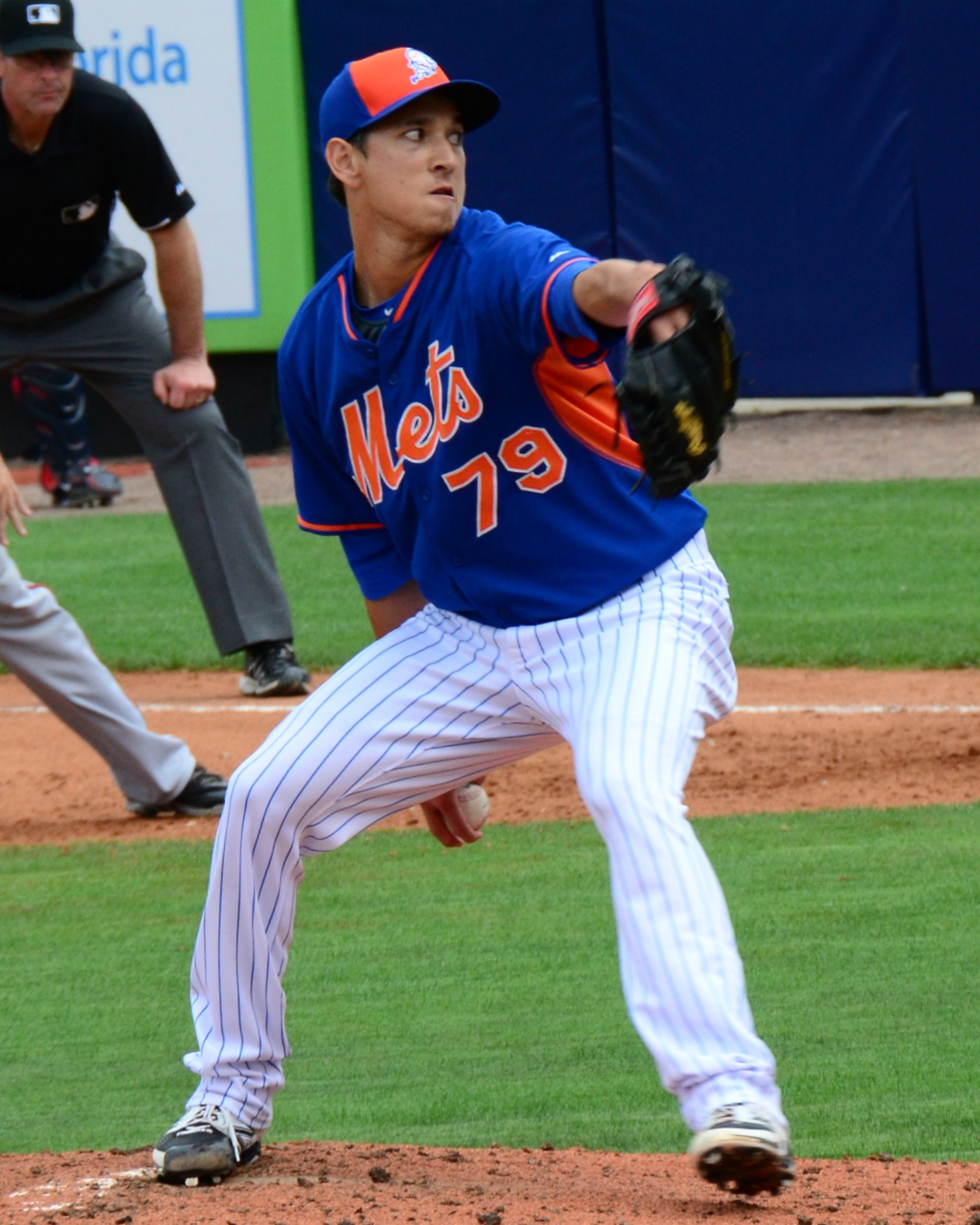
Bowman pitching for the New York Mets

Bowman started the 2014 season with the Binghamton Mets and was promoted to the Las Vegas 51s in July; in 24 games (23 starts) between the two teams, he was 10–8 with a 3.21 ERA. He spent the 2015 season back with Las Vegas, where he pitched to a 7–16 record and 5.53 ERA.

=== St. Louis Cardinals ===
The St. Louis Cardinals selected Bowman in the 2015 Rule 5 draft. He made his MLB debut against the Pittsburgh Pirates on April 6, 2016, throwing two innings with one hit allowed and two strikeouts. He earned his first MLB win on June 8, 2016, in relief against the Cincinnati Reds. Bowman finished his first MLB season with a 2–5 win–loss record along with a 3.46 ERA. In 2017, he was 3–6 with two saves and a 3.99 ERA in 58 2/3 innings pitched in relief.

Bowman began 2018 back in St. Louis' bullpen. However, after compiling a 5.75 ERA in 20 1/3 innings pitched with two stints on the disabled list, he was optioned to the Triple-A Memphis Redbirds on July 5. He was recalled by St. Louis on July 18 and optioned back to Memphis on July 21, and spent the remainder of the season there. In 22 relief appearances for the Cardinals he was 0–2 with a 6.26 ERA, and in 18 relief appearances for Memphis, he compiled a 0–1 record with a 4.30 ERA.

=== Cincinnati Reds ===
On November 2, 2018, Bowman was claimed off waivers by the Cincinnati Reds. He began the 2019 season with the Louisville Bats, and was promoted to the Reds in May. Bowman underwent Tommy John surgery in mid-September 2020. On October 14, 2020, Bowman was outrighted off of the roster. Bowman elected free agency two days later on October 16.

=== New York Yankees ===
On December 14, 2020, Bowman signed a two-year minor league contract with the New York Yankees organization. Bowman did not pitch in 2021 as he recovered from surgery, and missed the entire 2022 season as well. He elected free agency on November 10, 2022.

On January 13, 2023, Bowman re-signed with the Yankees organization on a minor league contract. He began the year with the Triple–A Scranton/Wilkes-Barre RailRiders, making 30 appearances and logging a 3.29 ERA with 36 strikeouts and 3 saves in 38 1/3 innings pitched. On July 16, Bowman exercised the opt–out clause in his contract and was released by the Yankees. On July 20, Bowman re–signed with the Yankees on a major league contract and was optioned back to Triple–A Scranton.

The Yankees promoted Bowman to the major leagues on September 10. In three games for the Yankees, he allowed four runs on six hits with three strikeouts in four innings of work. Following the season on November 2, Bowman was removed from the 40-man roster and sent outright to Triple–A Scranton. He elected free agency on November 6.

=== Minnesota Twins ===
On January 18, 2024, Bowman signed a minor league contract with the Minnesota Twins. He made five scoreless appearances for the Triple–A St. Paul Saints to begin the year. On April 13, the Twins selected Bowman's contract to the major league roster. He made five appearances for Minnesota, recording a 2.35 ERA with 6 strikeouts across 7 2/3 innings pitched. On April 30, Bowman was designated for assignment by the Twins.

=== Arizona Diamondbacks ===
On May 2, 2024, Bowman was traded to the Arizona Diamondbacks in exchange for cash. In four appearances for the Diamondbacks, he struggled to an 8.10 ERA with four strikeouts across 6 2/3 innings pitched. On May 26, Bowman was designated for assignment by Arizona. He cleared waivers and was sent outright to the Triple–A Reno Aces on May 31, but rejected the assignment in favor of free agency.

=== Seattle Mariners ===
On June 4, 2024, Bowman signed a minor league contract with the Seattle Mariners. After two scoreless appearances for the Triple–A Tacoma Rainiers, Bowman was called up by the Mariners on June 9. He made only one appearance for Seattle before he was designated for assignment on June 11. Bowman elected free agency on June 14. He re-signed with the team on a new minor league contract on June 16. In 8 total appearances for Tacoma, Bowman compiled a 3.60 ERA with 11 strikeouts across 10 innings pitched. On July 1, Bowman exercised the opt–out clause in his contract and was granted his release by the Mariners.

=== Minnesota Twins (second stint) ===
On July 4, 2024, Bowman signed a minor league contract to return to the Minnesota Twins organization. On August 12, Bowman exercised the opt–out clause in his contract; the Twins chose to release him.

=== Baltimore Orioles ===
On August 15, 2024, Bowman signed a minor league contract with the Baltimore Orioles. After two scoreless appearances for the Triple–A Norfolk Tides, Bowman was selected to the major league roster on August 22. In 15 appearances for Baltimore, he posted a 3.45 ERA with 14 strikeouts across 15 2/3 innings pitched. On November 4, Bowman was removed from the 40-man roster and sent outright to Norfolk, but he rejected the assignment and elected free agency.

On December 20, 2024, Bowman re–signed with the Orioles on a minor league contract. On March 23, 2025, the Orioles selected Bowman's contract, but three days later removed him from the 40-man roster and sent him outright to Triple-A Norfolk. After an injury to Albert Suárez, Bowman's contracted was re-selected on March 30. In 16 appearances for Baltimore, he recorded a 5.19 ERA with 12 strikeouts across 17 1/3 innings pitched. Bowman was designated for assignment by the Orioles on May 8. He cleared waivers and was sent outright to Norfolk on May 10. On May 28, the Orioles selected Bowman's contract, re-adding him to their active roster. After two more appearances, he was again designated for assignment on June 8. Bowman cleared waivers and was sent outright to Norfolk on June 10. On June 29, Bowman's contract was selected once again, and he was added back to Baltimore's active roster. He allowed four runs in 1 2/3 innings against the Texas Rangers on July 1, and was designated for assignment the following day. Bowman returned to Norfolk after clearing outright waivers on July 4. On August 22, the Orioles once more added Bowman to their active roster after an injury to Brandon Young. He allowed two runs in 1 1/3 innings against the Houston Astros that day. Bowman was designated for assignment by the Orioles on August 26, and released three days later.

=== Houston Astros ===
On August 30, 2025, Bowman signed a minor league contract with the Houston Astros organization. He made nine appearances (one start) for the Triple-A Sugar Land Space Cowboys, logging a 2–2 record and 3.48 ERA with 11 strikeouts across 10 1/3 innings pitched. Bowman elected free agency on November 6.

=== Minnesota Twins (third stint) ===
On January 26, 2026, Bowman signed a minor league contract with the Minnesota Twins. He was released by Minnesota after exercising an opt-out clause in his contract on March 22. On March 25, Bowman re-signed with the Twins organization on a new minor league contract. He made 14 appearances for the Triple-A St. Paul Saints, compiling a 1–1 record and 1.69 ERA with 25 strikeouts and three saves across 21 1/3 innings pitched. On May 20, Bowman was released by Minnesota after exercising another opt-out clause.

=== Toronto Blue Jays ===
On May 26, 2026, Bowman signed a minor league contract with the Toronto Blue Jays organization. He made nine appearances for the Triple-A Buffalo Bisons, but struggled to an 0-1 record and 10.38 ERA with nine strikeouts and one save across 8 2/3 innings pitched. Bowman was released by Toronto on July 4, after triggering an opt-out clause in his contract.

=== Minnesota Twins (fourth stint) ===
On July 8, 2026, Bowman signed a minor league contract with the Minnesota Twins and was assigned to the Triple-A St. Paul Saints. He elected free agency on November 2.

== Personal life ==
Bowman's parents are Margaret Chou and the late William Bowman. He is married to trial attorney Eve Levin, daughter of South African-born businessman, medical doctor and research scientist Jeremy Levin and Margery Feldberg (daughter of Stanley Feldberg, co-founder of TJX Companies).

== See also ==
- St. Louis Cardinals all-time roster
- Cincinnati Reds all-time roster
- Rule 5 draft results
