= Burton, Georgia =

Coordinates: 34.83452°N 83.55326°W

The town of Burton, Georgia now lies underwater, covered by Lake Burton. The town was located at the confluence of Dicks Creek and the Tallulah River in Rabun County, Georgia and was established in the first half of the 19th century as a result of the Georgia Gold Rush. The first discovery of gold in Rabun County was just north of Burton, at the confluence of Moccasin Creek and the Tallulah River. The town was named after Jeremiah Burton, who owned the post office and general store there. The Burton Post Office was established in 1875 and discontinued in 1916.

Burton was located along the road from Clayton, Georgia to the Nacoochee Valley and became more than just a gold rush town – it served the corundum mines of Tate City. Eventually, the logging industry built a railway to the town so that lumber from the mountains could be transported to the mill in Helen, Georgia. By the early 20th century, the town of Burton had a population of approximately 200, making it the second largest town in Rabun County. In 1917, the Georgia Railway and Electric Company (predecessor of the Georgia Power Company) purchased the town of Burton and the surrounding homesteads. The dam for Lake Burton was closed on December 22, 1919, and before long the town was submerged.

== Sources ==
- Burton, Georgia on Roadside Georgia
- Burton profile on Ghosttowns.com
- 1883 Map of Rabun County
- 1915 Map of Rabun County
