= King Lear (baseball) =

American baseball player (1891–1976)

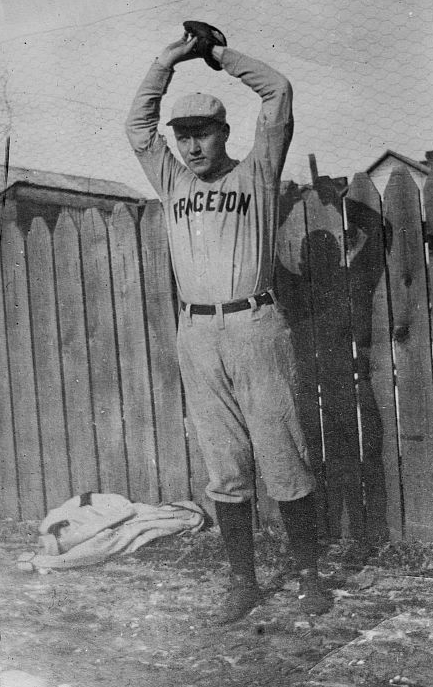
- Pitcher
- Born: January 23, 1891; Greencastle, Pennsylvania, U.S.
- Died: October 31, 1976 (aged 85); Waynesboro, Pennsylvania, U.S.
- Batted: Right Threw: Right

MLB debut
- May 2, 1914, for the Cincinnati Reds

Last MLB appearance
- September 29, 1915, for the Cincinnati Reds

MLB statistics
- Win–loss record: 7–12
- Earned run average: 3.02
- Strikeouts: 66
- Stats at Baseball Reference

Teams
- Cincinnati Reds (1914–1915)

Charles Bernard "King" Lear (January 23, 1891 – October 31, 1976) was an American professional baseball pitcher who played two seasons of Major League Baseball. He played for the Cincinnati Reds in 57 games during the 1914 and 1915 seasons.

== Biography ==
Lear was born in Greencastle, Pennsylvania, on January 23, 1891. He attended high school at Mercersburg Academy, and he attended college at Princeton University, pitching for the Tigers from 1910 to 1913. During the 1912 collegiate baseball season, Lear pitched every inning of the four Big Three (referring to Princeton, Harvard, and Yale) games, defeating Yale University in both games and defeating Harvard University in one.

After graduating from Princeton, Lear fielded offers from the New York Giants and other teams before signing with the Cincinnati Reds on January 3, 1914. He was noted in his time as one of the early pitchers of the knuckleball. Lear made his major league debut on May 2, 1914, for the Reds, and remained on the roster for the season as a relief pitcher. He finished the 1914 season having pitched in 17 games for the Reds, starting four and finishing nine. He won one game, lost two, threw three complete games, one shutout, and had an earned run average (ERA) of 3.07.

Lear's most productive season came in 1915 when he pitched 40 games. He was again the primary relief pitcher for the Reds squad, though he did start 15 games. He pitched 167 2/3 innings for the Reds in 1915, winning six games, losing 10, finishing 20 games, pitching nine complete games, and finished the season with an ERA of 3.01. His final major league appearance came on September 29, 1915. Lear was slated to be a part of the Reds' roster in 1916. However, he injured his throwing arm during training camp, which brought his professional baseball career to an early end.

Rogers Hornsby had his first plate appearance against Lear on September 10, 1915. Lear pitched a complete game victory that day, whereas Hornsby said of his nerves against Lear, "Naw, why should I be nervous? The other birds was hittin' him."

Lear died on October 31, 1976, after being hit by a car while walking in Waynesboro, Pennsylvania, and is buried at Cedar Hill Cemetery in Greencastle, the city of his birth.
