= George Twombly =

American baseball player (1892–1975)

- Outfielder
- Born: June 4, 1892; Boston, Massachusetts, U.S.
- Died: February 17, 1975 (aged 82); Lexington, Massachusetts, U.S.
- Batted: Right Threw: Right

MLB debut
- July 9, 1914, for the Cincinnati Reds

Last MLB appearance
- September 1, 1919, for the Washington Senators

MLB statistics
- Batting average: .211
- Home runs: 0
- Runs batted in: 33
- Stats at Baseball Reference

Teams
- Cincinnati Reds (1914–1916); Boston Braves (1917); Washington Senators (1919)

George Frederick "Silent George" Twombly (June 4, 1892 – February 17, 1975) was an American Major League Baseball player. He played five seasons with the Cincinnati Reds (1914–1916), Boston Braves (1917), and Washington Senators (1919). He was the older brother of Clarence "Babe" Twombly, who played for the Chicago Cubs in the early 1920s.

In 1911, then minor league Baltimore Orioles manager Jack Dunn signed the 18-year-old Twombly out of a Boston high school and sent him to the B-League Scranton Miners.

After he suffered appendicitis in 1914, his spot in the opening lineup for Baltimore was taken by a 19-year-old Babe Ruth. Later, the Cincinnati Reds were given the opportunity to purchase Babe Ruth from Baltimore, but instead took Twombly and shortstop Claud Derrick.

Twombly made his first appearance in a major league game on July 9, 1914, going 1–for–1 with a triple and a run scored against the Brooklyn Robins.

On February 8, 1916, Twombly was sold back to Baltimore. Twombly had an exceptional season from a power standpoint in the twilight years of the dead-ball era, leading the International League in home runs with 12. He also amassed 10 triples, 21 doubles, and 158 hits for a .313 batting average in 131 games for the Orioles.

Later in the 1916 season, despite majority opinion against it within the organization, Twombly was briefly brought back up to the Reds for three games as the season wound down and the team was clearly not going to make the World Series, garnering a regular season record of 60–93. Twombly made no impact, reaching base only once in six plate appearances on a walk before being sent back to Baltimore.

After being released by the Boston Braves partway through June 1917, Twombly announced his retirement from baseball.

On August 13, 1919, Twombly was signed by George Weiss, then owner of the New Haven Weissmen of the Class A Eastern League. Twombly closed out his professional career with New Haven, hitting for a .309 average over 55 at-bats in 17 games.
