= Charlie See =

American baseball player (1896–1948)

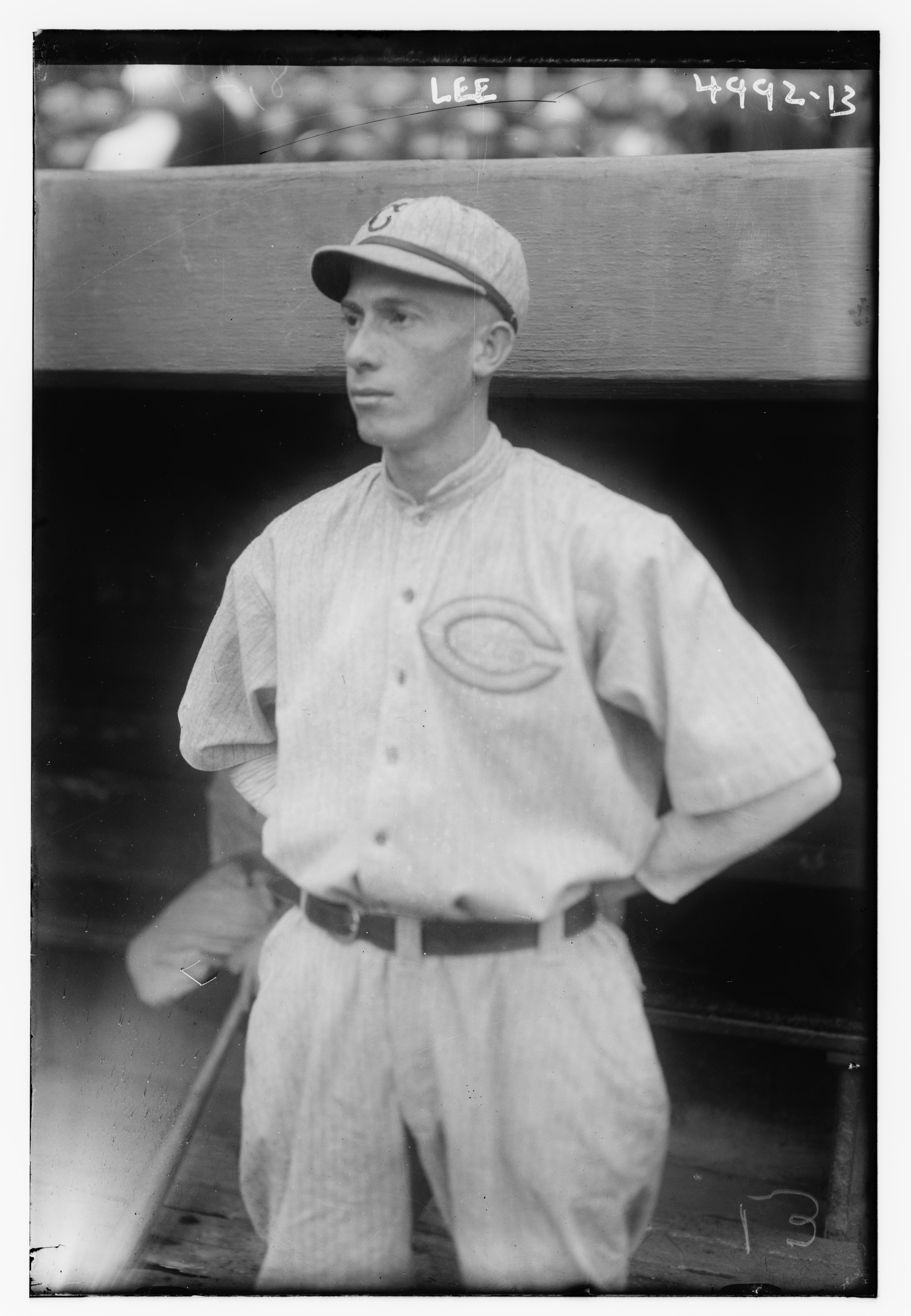
- Outfielder
- Born: October 13, 1896; Pleasantville, New York
- Died: July 19, 1948 (aged 51); Bridgeport, Connecticut
- Batted: Left Threw: Right

MLB debut
- August 6, 1919, for the Cincinnati Reds

Last MLB appearance
- July 8, 1921, for the Cincinnati Reds
- Stats at Baseball Reference

Teams
- Cincinnati Reds (1919–1921)

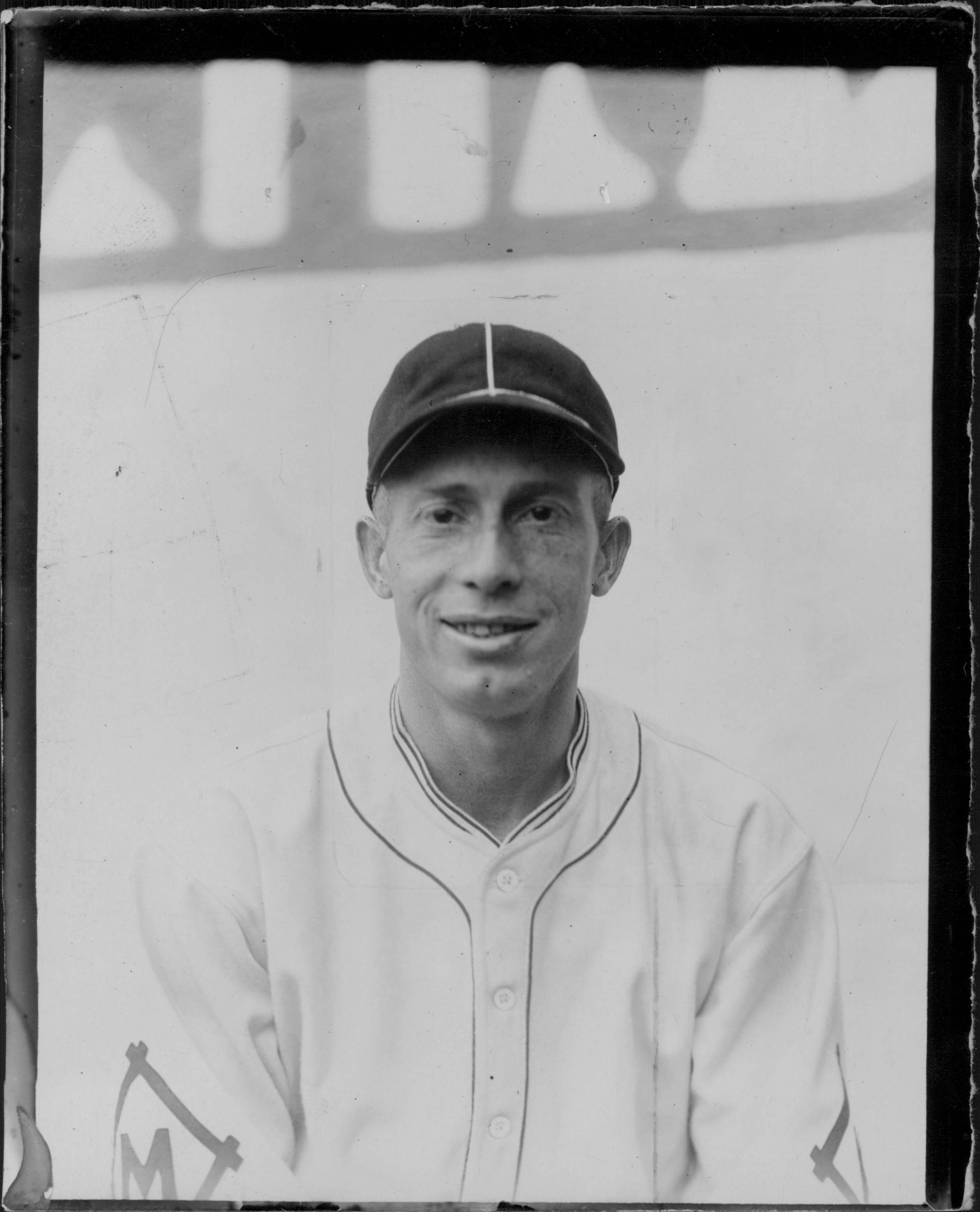
Charlie See with the minor league Minneapolis Millers, 1920's

Charles "Chad" Henry See (October 13, 1896 – July 19, 1948) was an American baseball player. Playing for the Major League Baseball, he was an outfielder who played for the Cincinnati Reds from 1919 to 1921.

In his 92 games over three seasons, See posted a .272 batting average (55-for-202) with 21 runs, 1 home run and 23 RBI.
