= Fritz Von Kolnitz =

American baseball player (1893–1948)

- Third baseman
- Born: May 20, 1893; Charleston, South Carolina, U.S.
- Died: March 18, 1948 (aged 54); Mount Pleasant, South Carolina, U.S.
- Batted: Right Threw: Right

MLB debut
- April 18, 1914, for the Cincinnati Reds

Last MLB appearance
- September 17, 1916, for the Chicago White Sox

MLB statistics
- Batting average: .212
- Hits: 48
- Stolen bases: 5
- Stats at Baseball Reference

Teams
- Cincinnati Reds (1914–1915); Chicago White Sox (1916)

Alfred Holmes "Fritz" Von Kolnitz (May 20, 1893 – March 18, 1948) was an American Major League Baseball third baseman who played for three seasons. He played for the Cincinnati Reds from 1914 to 1915 and the Chicago White Sox in 1916.

Due to his Prussian-sounding surname, he used the name "R.H. Holmes" when first starting in 1913, due to the anti-German sentiment that existed at the time.

Before starting his baseball career, Von Kolnitz played baseball at the College of Charleston and then baseball and football at the University of South Carolina. He is in the Hall of Fame for both schools His baseball career went on hiatus as he joined the U.S. military to serve during the First World War. "Von Kolnitz played a lot of baseball at Camp Gordon, and was promoted from the rank of captain to major in September 1918, making him the highest ranked former major league player in military service during the First World War," Gary Bedingfield wrote for the Baseball's Greatest Sacrifice website According to Bedingfield, after the war Von Kolnitz worked in the real estate and insurance fields and was an author on historical matters. He served as the athletics director for the College of Charleston and pursued political office. When World War II broke out, he re-entered the service, eventually earning the rank of lieutenant colonel. "He later became the senior intelligence officer with the 322nd Bomb Group stationed in England. The 322nd Bomb Group was stationed at Bury St. Edmunds, and was the first to fly Martin B-26 Marauders from the United Kingdom. In September 1943, Von Kolnitz was awarded the Legion of Merit for perfecting a sand-table that he used to familiarize his air crews with their targets."
