= Norm Glockson =

American baseball and football player (1894–1955)

- Catcher
- Born: June 15, 1894; Blue Island, Illinois, U.S.
- Died: August 5, 1955 (aged 61); Maywood, Illinois, U.S.
- Batted: Right Threw: Right

MLB debut
- September 16, 1914, for the Cincinnati Reds

Last MLB appearance
- October 5, 1914, for the Cincinnati Reds

MLB statistics
- Games played: 7
- At bats: 12
- Hits: 0
- Stats at Baseball Reference

Teams
- Cincinnati Reds (1914)

Norman Stanley Glockson (June 15, 1894 – August 5, 1955) was an American Major League Baseball catcher and National Football League (NFL) guard.

Glockson played in seven games for the Cincinnati Reds in 1914. He also played in one game for the Racine Legion football team in 1922.

== See also ==
- List of athletes who played in Major League Baseball and the National Football League
