= Jack Rowan (baseball) =

American baseball player (1886–1966)

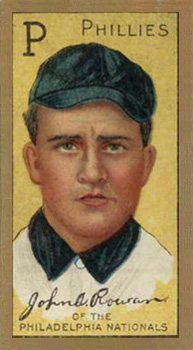
- Pitcher
- Born: June 16, 1886; New Castle, Pennsylvania, U.S.
- Died: September 29, 1966 (aged 80); Dayton, Ohio, U.S.
- Batted: Right Threw: Right

MLB debut
- September 6, 1906, for the Detroit Tigers

Last MLB appearance
- July 10, 1914, for the Cincinnati Reds

MLB statistics
- Win–loss record: 31–40
- Earned run average: 3.07
- Strikeouts: 267
- Stats at Baseball Reference

Teams
- Detroit Tigers (1906); Cincinnati Reds (1908–1910); Philadelphia Phillies (1911); Chicago Cubs (1911); Cincinnati Reds (1913–1914)

John Albert Rowan (June 16, 1886 – September 29, 1966) was a Major League Baseball pitcher. He pitched all or part of seven seasons in the majors, between 1906 and 1914, for four teams. When he wasn't pitching in the majors, Rowan played for the Dayton Veterans of the Central League in 1908 and from 1912 until 1917.
