= Tiny Graham =

American baseball player (1892–1962)

- First baseman
- Born: September 9, 1892; Nashville, Tennessee, U.S.
- Died: December 29, 1962 (aged 70); Nashville, Tennessee, U.S.
- Batted: Right Threw: Right

MLB debut
- August 30, 1914, for the Cincinnati Reds

Last MLB appearance
- October 5, 1914, for the Cincinnati Reds

MLB statistics
- Batting average: .230
- Home runs: 0
- Runs batted in: 3
- Stats at Baseball Reference

Teams
- Cincinnati Reds (1914)

Dawson Francis "Tiny" Graham (September 9, 1892 – December 29, 1962) was an American Major League Baseball first baseman who played for the Cincinnati Reds in 1914.
