= Pat Griffin (baseball) =

American baseball player (1893–1927)

- Pitcher
- Born: May 6, 1893; Niles, Ohio
- Died: July 7, 1927 (aged 34); Youngstown, Ohio
- Batted: Right Threw: Right

MLB debut
- July 23, 1914, for the Cincinnati Reds

Last MLB appearance
- July 23, 1914, for the Cincinnati Reds

MLB statistics
- Games pitched: 1
- Innings pitched: 1.0
- Earned run average: 9.00
- Stats at Baseball Reference

Teams
- Cincinnati Reds (1914)

Patrick Richard Griffin (May 6, 1893 – June 7, 1927) was a professional baseball pitcher who played in one game for the Cincinnati Reds on July 23, 1914.
