= Harry LaRoss =

American baseball player (1888–1954)

- Outfielder
- Born: January 2, 1888; Easton, Pennsylvania, U.S.
- Died: March 22, 1954 (aged 66); Chicago, Illinois, U.S.
- Batted: Right Threw: Right

MLB debut
- June 24, 1914, for the Cincinnati Reds

Last MLB appearance
- July 23, 1914, for the Cincinnati Reds

MLB statistics
- Batting average: .229
- Home runs: 0
- Runs batted in: 5
- Stats at Baseball Reference

Teams
- Cincinnati Reds (1914)

Harry Raymond "Spike" LaRoss (January 2, 1888 – March 22, 1954) was an American Major League Baseball outfielder who played for the Cincinnati Reds in 1914.
