= Elmer Koestner =

American baseball player (1885–1959)

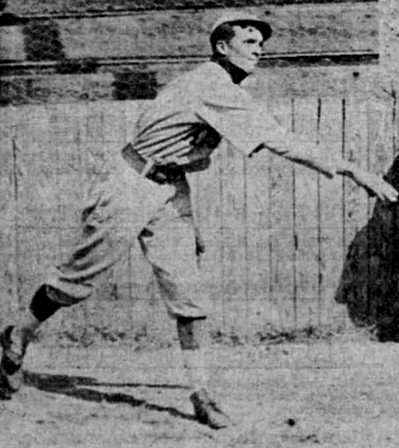
- Pitcher
- Born: November 30, 1885; Piper City, Illinois, U.S.
- Died: October 27, 1959 (aged 73); Fairbury, Illinois, U.S.
- Batted: Right Threw: Right

MLB debut
- April 23, 1910, for the Cleveland Naps

Last MLB appearance
- July 1, 1914, for the Cincinnati Reds

MLB statistics
- Pitching Record: 5-10
- Earned run average: 3.18
- Strikeouts: 56
- Stats at Baseball Reference

Teams
- Cleveland Naps (1910); Chicago Cubs (1914); Cincinnati Reds (1914)

Elmer Joseph Koestner (November 30, 1885 – October 27, 1959) was an American Major League Baseball pitcher who played for two seasons. He played for the Cleveland Naps in 1910 and the Chicago Cubs and Cincinnati Reds in 1914.
