= Pete Fahrer =

American baseball player (1890–1967)

- Pitcher
- Born: March 10, 1890; Holgate, Ohio, U.S.
- Died: June 10, 1967 (aged 77); Fremont, Michigan, U.S.
- Batted: Left Threw: Right

MLB debut
- August 17, 1914, for the Cincinnati Reds

Last MLB appearance
- September 6, 1914, for the Cincinnati Reds

MLB statistics
- Win–loss record: 0–0
- Earned run average: 1.13
- Strikeouts: 2
- Stats at Baseball Reference

Teams
- Cincinnati Reds (1914)

Clarence Willie "Pete" Fahrer (March 10, 1890 – June 10, 1967) was an American pitcher in Major League Baseball. He played for the Cincinnati Reds in 1914.
