= Pete Schneider =

American baseball player (1895–1957)

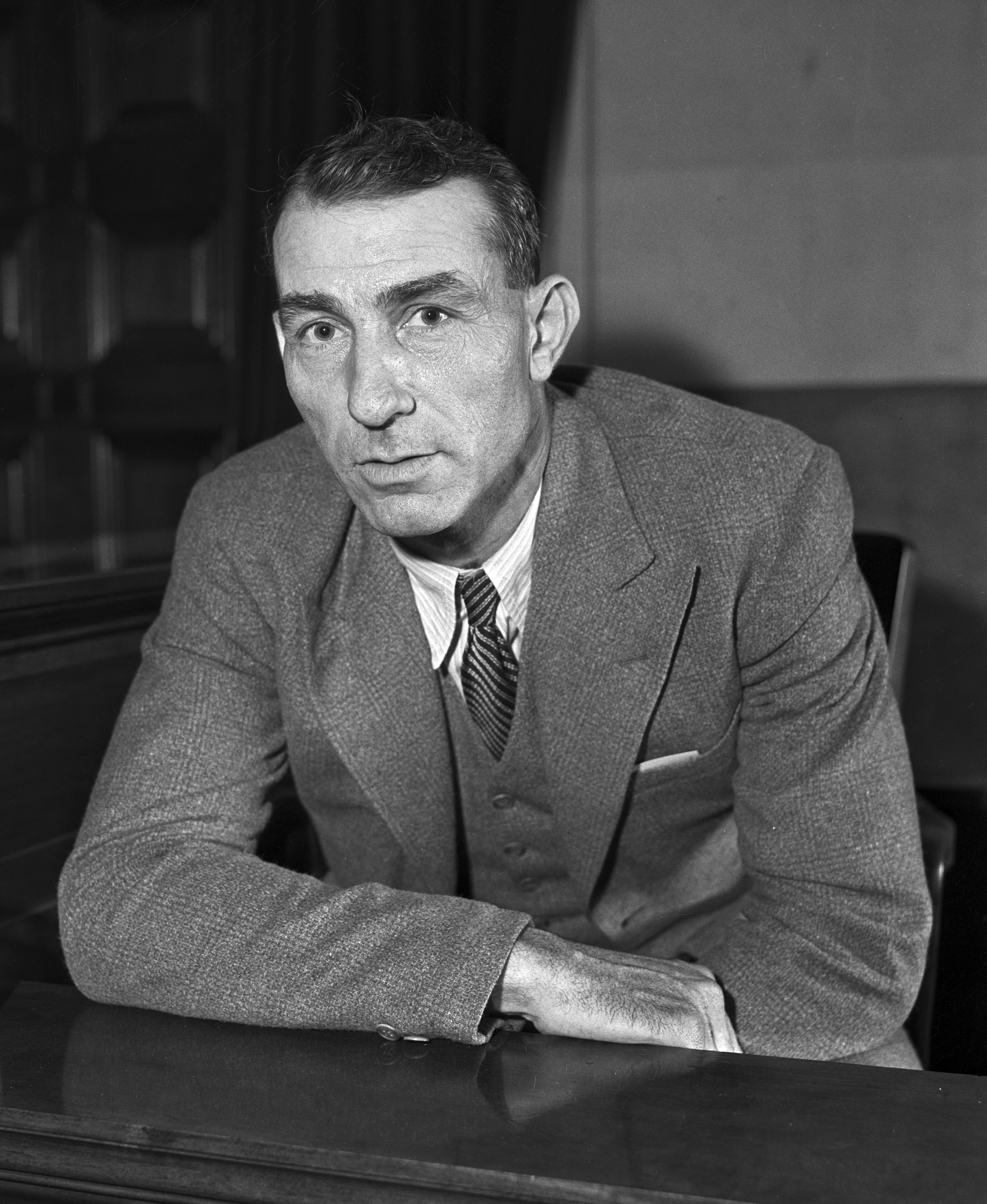
- Pitcher
- Born: August 20, 1895; Los Angeles, California, U.S.
- Died: June 1, 1957 (aged 61); Los Angeles, California, U.S.
- Batted: Right Threw: Right

MLB debut
- June 20, 1914, for the Cincinnati Reds

Last MLB appearance
- August 2, 1919, for the New York Yankees

MLB statistics
- Win–loss record: 59-86
- Earned run average: 2.66
- Strikeouts: 487
- Stats at Baseball Reference

Teams
- Cincinnati Reds (1914–1918); New York Yankees (1919)

Peter Joseph Schneider (August 20, 1895 – June 1, 1957) was an American pitcher in Major League Baseball who played for the Cincinnati Reds (1914–1918) and New York Yankees (1919). Schneider batted and threw right-handed.

== Career ==
Born in Los Angeles, California, Schneider was a hard-throwing pitcher who struggled with injuries and control problems. At age 18, he made a promising debut with the Cincinnati Reds in 1914, pitching a 1–0 shutout against the Pittsburgh Pirates. Despite a 5–14 mark in his rookie season he finished with a 2.92 earned run average. He recorded 14 wins in 1915 while posting a 2.48 ERA but led all National League pitchers with 19 losses. His most productive season came in 1917 when he posted career-highs with 20 wins and 333 2/3 innings pitched, but he lost 19 games for the third consecutive year.

On Opening Day 1918 against the Pittsburgh Pirates, Schneider threw a 1–0, one-hit shutout at Crosley Field. In July, he pitched a 10–0 one-hitter against the Philadelphia Phillies into the ninth inning, but walked the first six batters. Finally, Cincinnati won 10–9. Schneider pitched briefly for the Yankees in 1919. He injured his arm that season, converted to the outfield, and continued playing in the minor leagues until 1926.

In a six-season MLB career, Schneider posted a 59–86 record with a 2.66 ERA in 1274 innings. He recorded 10 shutouts among his 59 victories and had a 0.977 strikeout-to-walk ratio (487-to-498). As a hitter, he had a .221 batting average (96-for-434) with five home runs and 26 RBI.

From 1919 to 1925, Schneider played for the Vernon Tigers of the Pacific Coast League. On May 11, 1923, he set league records by hitting five home runs with 14 RBI in a game, during a 35–11 romp over Salt Lake City. A sixth home run was missed by two feet when he belted a line-drive double off the center field fence. That season, Schneider hit 19 home runs and ranked third in the PCL with a .360 batting average.

== Prison term ==
On February 16, 1935, Schneider became involved in a fight with a man named Gustave Schnabel at a bar in Los Angeles where Schnabel was employed. Schneider accused Schnabel of making improper advances towards his wife. The two men apparently resolved their differences and left together when the fight resumed, whereupon Schnabel collapsed after being hit by Schneider, fracturing his skull, leading to his death. Schneider was convicted of manslaughter and sentenced up to ten years in San Quentin State Prison. While incarcerated, he managed the prison's baseball team.

== Death ==
Schneider died at his home in Los Angeles, California on June 1, 1957 at the age of 61.
