= Claud Derrick =

American baseball player (1886–1974)

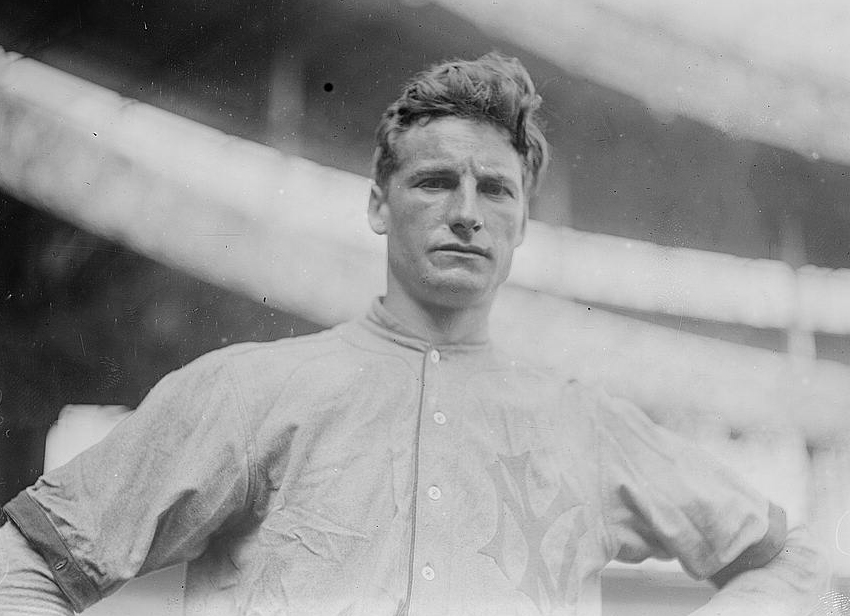
- Shortstop
- Born: June 11, 1886; Burton, Georgia, U.S.
- Died: July 15, 1974 (aged 88); Clayton, Georgia, U.S.
- Batted: Right Threw: Right

MLB debut
- September 8, 1910, for the Philadelphia Athletics

Last MLB appearance
- October 5, 1914, for the Chicago Cubs

MLB statistics
- Batting average: .242
- Home runs: 1
- Runs batted in: 33
- Stats at Baseball Reference

Teams
- Philadelphia Athletics (1910–1912); New York Yankees (1913); Cincinnati Reds (1914); Chicago Cubs (1914)

Career highlights and awards
- 2× World Series champion (1910, 1911)

Claud Lester "Deek" Derrick (June 11, 1886 – July 15, 1974) was an American Major League Baseball shortstop. He was born on June 11, 1886, in Burton, Georgia. Claud attended college at the University of Georgia. He played five seasons in his career, for the Philadelphia Athletics in 1910-1912, the New York Yankees in 1913, and the Cincinnati Reds and Chicago Cubs in 1914. He had 79 career hits in 326 at-bats with one home run and 33 RBI.

He was discovered by Athletics' first baseman and captain Harry Davis in 1909 while playing for the Greenville Spinners in the Carolina Association when Davis and a group of Athletics players were in Greenville. The following year, Athletics' owner Connie Mack signed him to the Major Leagues from Greenville shortly before the 1910 World Series, which the Athletics won.

After baseball, Derrick served as a Vice President of the Bank of Clayton in Clayton, Georgia and owned a Ford Motor Company dealership with his brother, Fred until retiring in 1956. Derrick died at his home in Clayton, Georgia after a long illness on July 15, 1974.
