= Karl Adams (baseball) =

American baseball player (1891–1967)

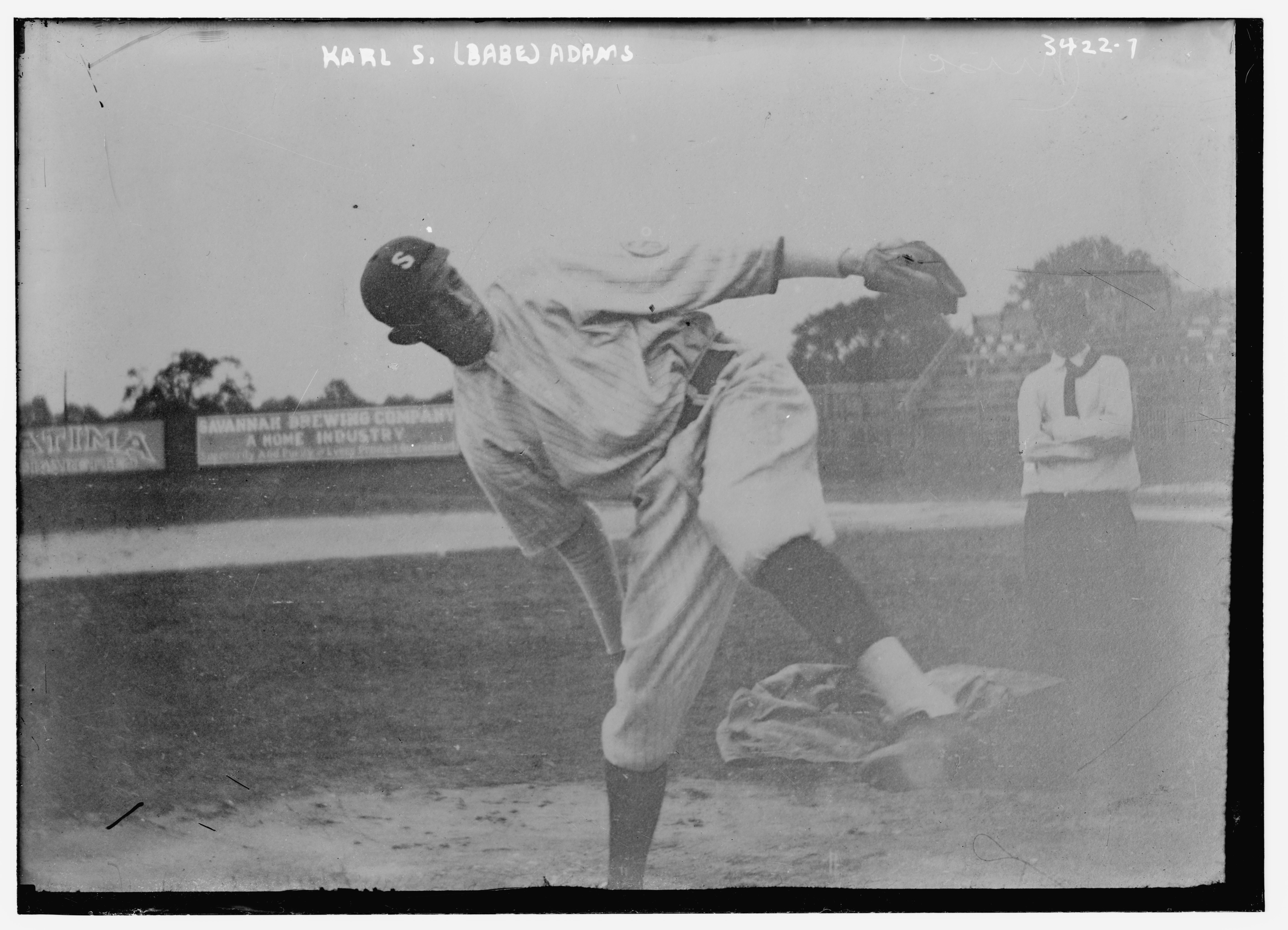
- Pitcher
- Born: August 11, 1891; Columbus, Georgia, U.S.
- Died: September 17, 1967 (aged 76); Everett, Washington, U.S.
- Batted: Right Threw: Right

MLB debut
- April 19, 1914, for the Cincinnati Reds

Last MLB appearance
- September 23, 1915, for the Chicago Cubs

MLB statistics
- Win–loss record: 1-9
- Earned run average: 5.01
- Strikeouts: 62
- Stats at Baseball Reference

Teams
- Cincinnati Reds (1914); Chicago Cubs (1915)

Karl Tutwiler Adams (August 11, 1891 – September 17, 1967), nicknamed "Rebel", was an American right-handed pitcher in Major League Baseball. He played for the Cincinnati Reds (1914) and Chicago Cubs (1915) of the National League, compiling a 1-9 won-lost record in his brief career.

Adams was a native of Columbus, Georgia. He died in Everett, Washington, where he had lived for the previous 27 years. He was a veteran of World War I and a member of the Veterans of Foreign Wars Old Guard Post 2100. After baseball, Karl worked for a number of years as a golf professional in Illinois and Kentucky. He was also a member of the Plumber and Pipefitters Union Local 265 and the Port Gardner Golf Club at Everett's Municipal Golf Course.
