= Bert Niehoff =

American baseball player (1884–1974)

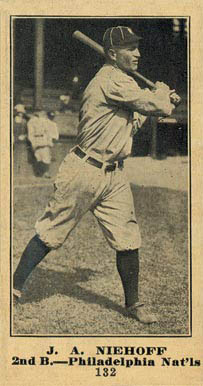
- Second baseman
- Born: May 13, 1884; Louisville, Colorado, U.S.
- Died: September 8, 1974 (aged 90); Inglewood, California, U.S.
- Batted: Right Threw: Right

MLB debut
- October 4, 1913, for the Cincinnati Reds

Last MLB appearance
- May 17, 1918, for the New York Giants

MLB statistics
- Batting average: .240
- Home runs: 12
- Runs batted in: 207
- Stats at Baseball Reference

Teams
- Cincinnati Reds (1913–1914); Philadelphia Phillies (1915–1917); St. Louis Cardinals (1918); New York Giants (1918)

John Albert Niehoff (May 13, 1884 – September 8, 1974) was an American second baseman in Major League Baseball who played for four clubs from the 1913 to 1918 seasons. He batted and threw right-handed.

== Playing career ==
A native of Louisville, Colorado, Niehoff entered the majors in 1913 with the Cincinnati Reds, playing for them two years before joining the Philadelphia Phillies (1915–1917), St. Louis Cardinals (1918) and New York Giants (1918). He was a classic line-drive hitter and steady double play partner for shortstops Buck Herzog (Reds) and Dave Bancroft (Phillies). His most productive season came in 1916 with Philadelphia, when he posted career-highs in runs (65) and runs batted in (61), while leading the National League hitters with 42 doubles. He also was a member of the Phillies team that lost the 1915 World Series to the Boston Red Sox.

In a six-season career, Niehoff was a .240 hitter (489-for-2037) with 12 home runs and 207 RBI in 581 games, including 210 runs, 104 doubles, 19 triples and 71 stolen bases.

== Post-playing career ==
Following his playing days, Niehoff enhanced his baseball career as a manager, coach, scout and general manager. He was one of the first managers selected by the All-American Girls Professional Baseball League, along with fellow former big leaguers Johnny Gottselig and Josh Billings and minor leaguer Eddie Stumpf. From 1943 to 1944 Niehoff managed the South Bend Blue Sox, a team that included talented players as Bonnie Baker, Doris Barr and Dottie Schroeder (the only woman who played every season of the AAGPBL).

Additionally, Niehoff coached for the 1929 New York Giants; scouted both for the New York Yankees (1948–1949) and California Angels (1961–1968), and spent 1952 as the Mobile Bears general manager.

As a minor league manager, Niehoff compiled an 1824–1713 record in 24 seasons between 1922 and 1954, including 15 years in the Southern Association and three league championship titles for the Mobile Bears (1922), Atlanta Crackers (1925) and Oklahoma City Indians (1935).

Niehoff died in Inglewood, California, at the age of 90.

== See also ==
- List of Major League Baseball annual doubles leaders

== Sources ==
- Career statistics from Baseball Reference · Baseball Reference (Minors) · Retrosheet · Baseball Almanac
- 1943 South Bend Blue Sox
- AAGPBL History
- Baseball Historian
