= Jack Theis =

American baseball player (1891–1941)

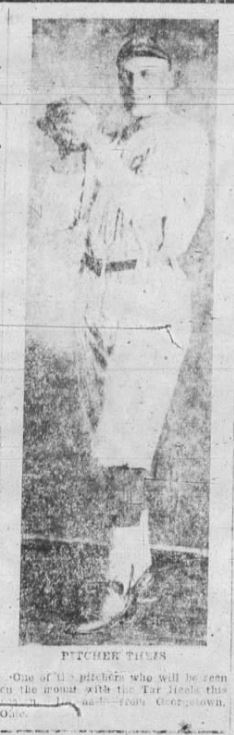
- Pitcher
- Born: July 23, 1891; Georgetown, Ohio
- Died: July 6, 1941 (aged 49); Georgetown, Ohio
- Batted: Right Threw: Right

MLB debut
- July 5, 1920, for the Cincinnati Reds

Last MLB appearance
- July 5, 1920, for the Cincinnati Reds

MLB statistics
- Games played: 1
- Innings pitched: 2
- Earned runs: 0
- Stats at Baseball Reference

Teams
- Cincinnati Reds (1920)

John Louis Theis (July 23, 1891 – July 6, 1941) was a pitcher in Major League Baseball. He played for the Cincinnati Reds. Theis holds the record shared by many for the lowest ERA in MLB history, having not allowed an earned run in the only game of his career.

He died from a heart attack in 1941 shortly before his 50th birthday.
