= Maury Uhler =

American baseball player (1886–1918)

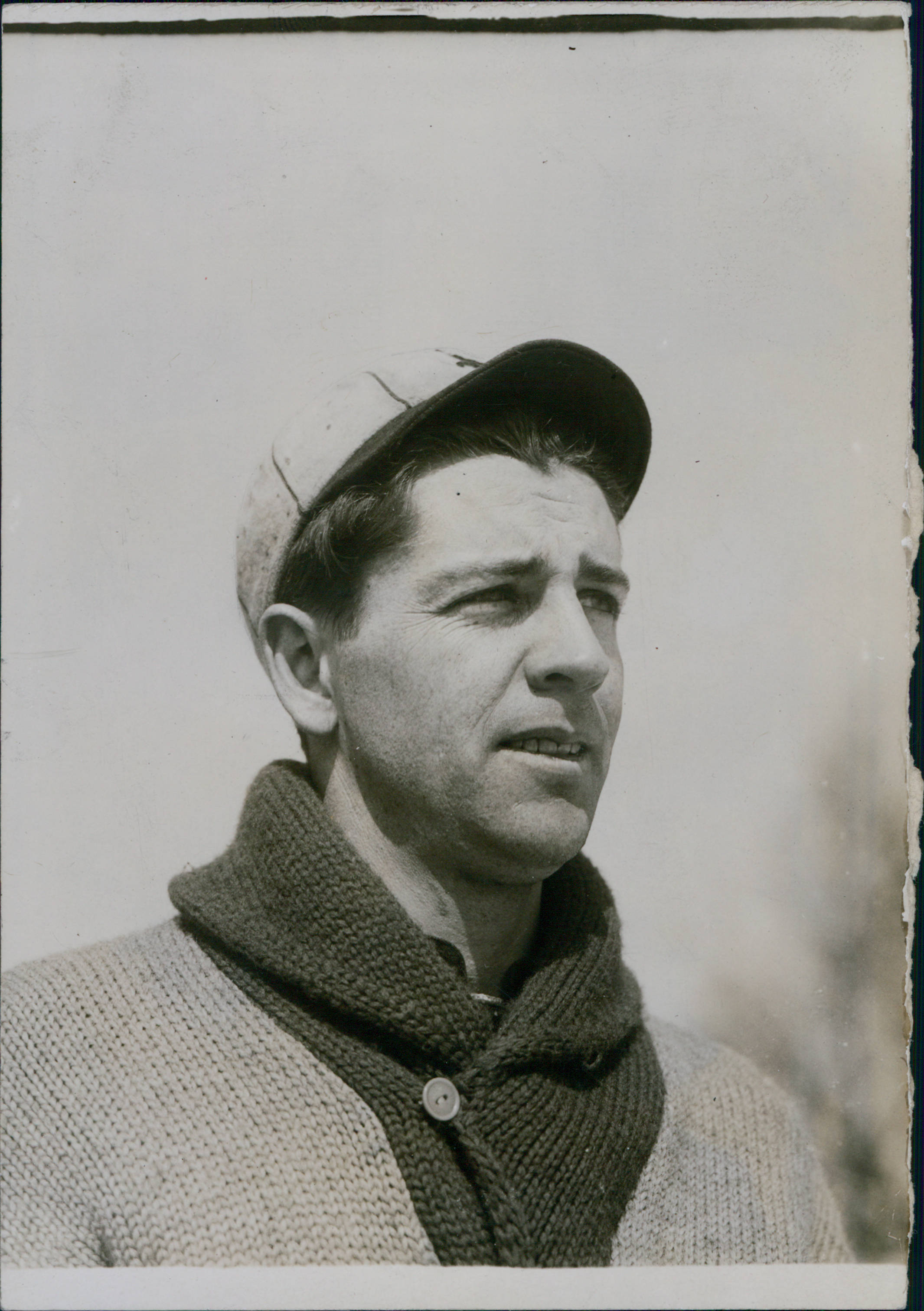
- Outfielder
- Born: December 14, 1886; Pikesville, Maryland
- Died: May 4, 1918 (aged 31); Baltimore, Maryland
- Batted: Right Threw: Right

MLB debut
- April 14, 1914, for the Cincinnati Reds

Last MLB appearance
- July 23, 1914, for the Cincinnati Reds

MLB statistics
- Batting average: .214
- Home runs: 0
- Runs batted in: 3
- Stats at Baseball Reference

Teams
- Cincinnati Reds (1914)

Maurice William "Maury" Uhler (December 14, 1886 – May 4, 1918) was a Major League Baseball outfielder who played in 1914 with the Cincinnati Reds. He batted and threw right-handed. Uhler had a .214 batting average in 46 games in his one-year career.

He was born in Pikesville, Maryland, and died in Baltimore, Maryland.
