= Bill Kellogg =

American baseball player (1884–1971)

- Infielder
- Born: May 25, 1884; Albany, New York
- Died: December 12, 1971 (aged 87); Baltimore, Maryland
- Batted: Right Threw: Right

MLB debut
- April 14, 1914, for the Cincinnati Reds

Last MLB appearance
- October 5, 1914, for the Cincinnati Reds

MLB statistics
- Batting average: .175
- Home runs: 0
- Runs batted in: 7
- Stats at Baseball Reference

Teams
- Cincinnati Reds (1914)

William Dearstyne Kellogg (May 25, 1884 – December 12, 1971) was an infielder in Major League Baseball. He played for the Cincinnati Reds.
