= Tommy Clarke =

American baseball player (1888–1945)

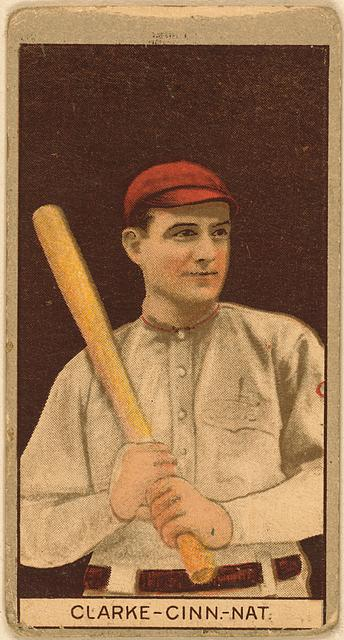
- Catcher
- Born: May 9, 1888; New York, New York, U.S.
- Died: August 14, 1945 (aged 57); Corona, New York, U.S.
- Batted: Right Threw: Right

MLB debut
- August 26, 1909, for the Cincinnati Reds

Last MLB appearance
- August 21, 1918, for the Chicago Cubs

MLB statistics
- Batting average: .265
- Home runs: 6
- Runs batted in: 191
- Stats at Baseball Reference

Teams
- As player: Cincinnati Reds (1909–1917); Chicago Cubs (1918); As coach: New York Giants (1932–1935, 1938)

Career highlights and awards
- World Series champion (1933)

Thomas Aloysius Clarke (May 9, 1888 – August 14, 1945) was an American backup catcher in Major League Baseball who played from 1909 through 1918 for the Chicago Cubs and Cincinnati Reds. He also served as a coach on the 1933 World Championship Giants team.
