= Howard Lohr =

American baseball player (1892–1977)

- Outfielder
- Born: June 3, 1892; Philadelphia, Pennsylvania, U.S.
- Died: January 9, 1977 (aged 84); Philadelphia, Pennsylvania, U.S.
- Batted: Right Threw: Right

MLB debut
- June 17, 1914, for the Cincinnati Reds

Last MLB appearance
- August 5, 1916, for the Cleveland Indians

MLB statistics
- Batting average: .204
- Home runs: 0
- Runs batted in: 8
- Stats at Baseball Reference

Teams
- Cincinnati Reds (1914); Cleveland Indians (1916)

Howard Sylvester "Howie" Lohr (June 3, 1892 – June 9, 1977) was an American Major League Baseball outfielder and power hitter who played for two seasons. He played for the Cincinnati Reds in 1914 and the Cleveland Indians in 1916.

== Early life ==
Howie Lohr was born on June 3, 1892 in Philadelphia, Pennsylvania. His parents were Martha (née Mullner) and John Lohr, who operated a produce store. Lohr's paternal grandparents were immigrants from Germany who settled in Philadelphia. He was raised in the Evangelical Reform Church.

Lohr attended Kenderton Public School. He had some high school education but did not graduate. He worked for his father's business and also played baseball in the Philadelphia area.

== Career ==
In 1912, Lohr signed a contract with the Class B Tri-State League's Johnstown Johnnies but was suspended before playing any games and was released from the league by March 1913. In 1912, Lohr joined the Prospect Park squad in the Delaware County League's Prospect Park team. He also played for the Penn Railroad Purchasing Department team that won the Railroad League. The next season, he played for the Uplands of the Delaware County League. He played for the Clifton Heights White Sox in the Delaware County League in 1914. There, his performance began to be noticed by sports journalists and scouts.

Lohr made his debut as an outfielder in Major League Baseball on June 17, 1914, with the Cincinnati Reds. However, Lohr was verbally abused by pitcher Phil Douglas and eventually responded by knocking Douglas out. On July 15, 1914, after just two months with the Reds, Lohr was optioned to Memphis but he refused to go to the minor leagues. He received an unconditional release from the Reds on July 24, 1914.

Lohr returned to semi-pro baseball. In 1914, he finished the season with the Clifton Heights team and played with them again in 1915. In 1915, he was also the top base runner in Philadelphia-area semipro players. Bill Donovan, manager of the New York Yankees, tried to sign Lohr in April 1915, but Lohr declined to return to the majors. In 1916, Lohr played with a team in Jersey City, New Jersey with Eddie Grant and Rivington Bisland. In July, Connie Mack invited Lohr to tryout for the Philadelphia Athletics; before the tryout took place, Lee Fohl, manager of the Cleveland Indians who was in Philadelphia for his team's game, saw Lohr play, and signed him before Mack.

Lohr started his career with the Cleveland Indians batting fourth and playing in right field on July 21, 1916. His final game with the Indians was on August 5, 1916. The Indians decided to send Lohr to Columbus, but Lohr again refused to accept a minor league placement. Thus, he retired from major league baseball after 21 games.

Lohr returned to the Delaware County League in 1916. He joined the Chester, Pennsylvania, of the Penn-Jersey League in 1917. Staying with that league, he played semi-pro baseball with the Patterson, New Jersey Silk Sox from 1918 to 1922, hitting 40 home runs. The semi-pros allowed him play baseball and work as a railroad accountant, which made more money than professional baseball and did not require traveling. He was also team's manager during his last two years with the Silk Sox. At the same time, he played with the Norristown Pros; the Pross played Mondays and the Silk Sox played on Saturdays and Sundays.

In May 1922, he signed with the South Phillies, an independent team. He returned to the Chester, Pennsylvania team in 1923, taking the team to the league title in 1923 and 1924, with nearly 100 games each season. The team joined the Interstate League in 1926, a combination of the Eastern Colored League and white teams that played three games a week. Lohr played center field and was the team manager. Later, he played semi-pro ball with the Brooklyn Bushwicks.

Cleveland continued to list Lohr as a reserve player until 1919 when they traded him to the Pittsburgh Pirates. However, he again refused to report. He was listed as "voluntarily retired" on the Pirates' reserve list until 1935. The Pirates granted him free agency in April 1935, the same year that he retired from baseball.

Lohr was known as a "crack fielder" and "heavy hitter". In the semi-pros, he frequently had the team's highest batting average. In the 1921 season, he hit 54 against all competition. He was inducted into the Delaware County Sports Hall of Fame in January 1957, despite not living in that county.

== Personal life ==
Lohr married Etta Winnet Wright on August 12, 1914. The couple had no children, but Lohr did help raise his stepson, William Wright.

He was a Mason and was a member of the board of directors of the Provident Savings Association of Philadelphia. He retired from his position as an accountant with the Pennsylvania Railroad in 1957 after working there for forty years.

Lohr died on January 9, 1977, at Presbyterian Hospital in Philadelphia at the age of 85 years. He was buried in Arlington Cemetery in Drexel Hill, Pennsylvania.
