= Ed Kippert =

American baseball player (1879–1960)

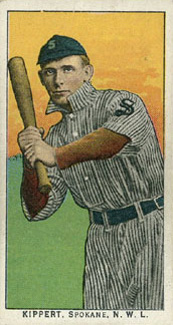
- Outfielder
- Born: January 23, 1879; Detroit, Michigan, U.S.
- Died: June 3, 1960 (aged 81); Detroit, Michigan, U.S.
- Batted: Right Threw: Right

MLB debut
- April 14, 1914, for the Cincinnati Reds

Last MLB appearance
- April 19, 1914, for the Cincinnati Reds

MLB statistics
- Games played: 2
- At bats: 2
- Hits: 0
- Stats at Baseball Reference

Teams
- Cincinnati Reds (1914)

Edward August "Kickapoo" Kippert (January 23, 1879 – June 3, 1960) was an American Major League Baseball outfielder who played in two games for the Cincinnati Reds in 1914. He also played in the minor leagues from 1906 to 1916.
