= Monroe Swartz =

American baseball player (1897–1980)

- Pitcher
- Born: January 1, 1897; Farmersville, Ohio, U.S.
- Died: January 13, 1980 (aged 83); Germantown, Ohio, U.S.
- Batted: Right Threw: Right

MLB debut
- October 3, 1920, for the Cincinnati Reds

Last MLB appearance
- October 3, 1920, for the Cincinnati Reds

MLB statistics
- Games played: 1
- Innings pitched: 12
- Earned run average: 4.50
- Stats at Baseball Reference

Teams
- Cincinnati Reds (1920)

Vernon Monroe Swartz (January 1, 1897 – January 13, 1980), nicknamed "Dazzy", was an American pitcher in Major League Baseball. He played for the Cincinnati Reds.

Swartz was signed by the Reds halfway through the 1920 season but did not see any action until the final game of year. He started against the St. Louis Cardinals at Redland Field on October 3, 1920. Swartz held the lead until the ninth inning when he allowed the first two batters, Pickles Dillhoefer and Jack Fournier, to reach second and third. When Heinie Mueller grounded the ball back to Swartz, he threw Dillhoefer out at the plate. But when the next batter, Hal Janvrin, hit another comebacker, Swartz instead made the play to first base, allowing pinch runner Burt Shotton to score the tying run. Swartz went on to pitch a complete game, surrendering the three winning runs in the twelfth and final inning.
