= Bob Ingersoll (baseball) =

American baseball player (1883–1927)

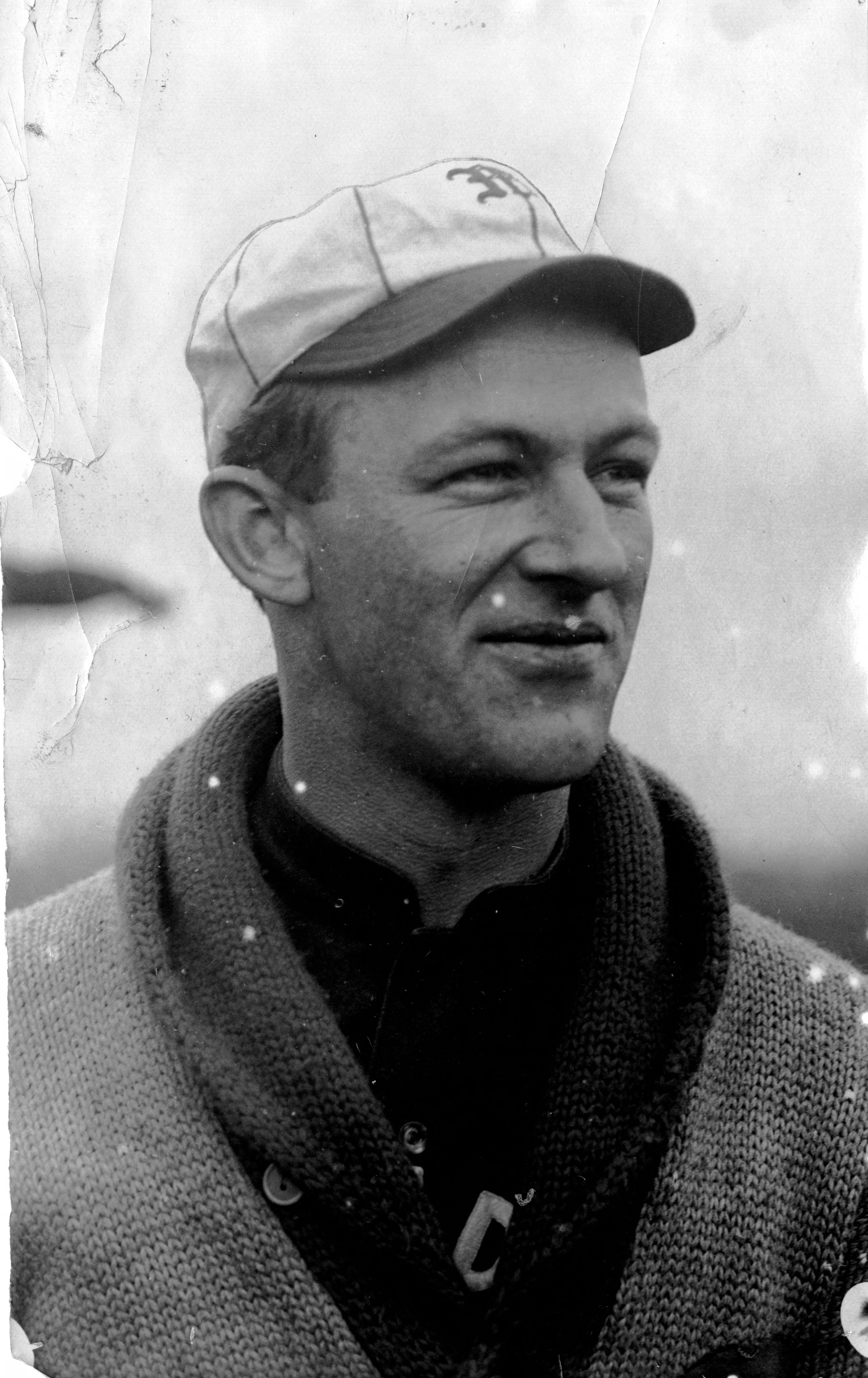
- Pitcher
- Born: January 8, 1883; Rapid City, South Dakota
- Died: January 13, 1927 (aged 44); Minneapolis, Minnesota
- Batted: Right Threw: Right

MLB debut
- April 23, 1914, for the Cincinnati Reds

Last MLB appearance
- June 2, 1914, for the Cincinnati Reds

MLB statistics
- Win–loss record: 0-0
- Strikeouts: 2
- Earned run average: 3.00
- Stats at Baseball Reference

Teams
- Cincinnati Reds (1914)

Robert Randolph Ingersoll (January 8, 1883 – January 13, 1927) was a Major League Baseball pitcher for the Cincinnati Reds in 1914. He pitched in just four games that year, all in relief. In six innings of work he gave up five hits, five walks and two runs while striking out two batters.
