= 1917 Pittsburgh Pirates season =

1917 Pittsburgh Pirates
- League: National League
- Ballpark: Forbes Field
- City: Pittsburgh, Pennsylvania
- Owners: Barney Dreyfuss
- Managers: Nixey Callahan, Honus Wagner, Hugo Bezdek

The 1917 Pittsburgh Pirates season was the 36th season of the Pittsburgh Pirates franchise; the 31st in the National League. The Pirates finished eighth and last in the league standings with a record of 51–103.

== Regular season ==
=== Season standings ===
National League
Team	W	L	Pct.	GB	Home	Road
New York Giants	98	56	.636	—	50‍–‍28	48‍–‍28
Philadelphia Phillies	87	65	.572	10	46‍–‍29	41‍–‍36
St. Louis Cardinals	82	70	.539	15	38‍–‍38	44‍–‍32
Cincinnati Reds	78	76	.506	20	39‍–‍38	39‍–‍38
Chicago Cubs	74	80	.481	24	35‍–‍42	39‍–‍38
Boston Braves	72	81	.471	25½	35‍–‍42	37‍–‍39
Brooklyn Robins	70	81	.464	26½	36‍–‍38	34‍–‍43
Pittsburgh Pirates	51	103	.331	47	25‍–‍53	26‍–‍50

=== Record vs. opponents ===
1917 National League record Sources:
Team	BSN	BRO	CHC	CIN	NYG	PHI	PIT	STL
Boston	—	13–9–1	11–11	10–12–2	7–15	11–11	14–8	6–15–1
Brooklyn	9–13–1	—	7–15	10–12	9–13–2	9–11–1	16–6–1	10–11
Chicago	11–11	15–7	—	8–14–1	7–15–1	6–16–1	17–5	10–12
Cincinnati	12–10–2	12–10	14–8–1	—	11–11	8–14	12–10	9–13
New York	15–7	13–9–2	15–7–1	11–11	—	14–8	16–6–1	14–8
Philadelphia	11–11	11–9–1	16–6–1	14–8	8–14	—	14–8	13–9
Pittsburgh	8–14	6–16–1	5–17	10–12	6–16–1	8–14	—	8–14–1
St. Louis	15–6–1	11–10	12–10	13–9	8–14	9–13	14–8–1	—

=== Game log ===
1917 Game Log: 51–103 (Home: 25–53; Away: 26–50)
April: 7–11 (Home: 2–3; Away: 5–8)

#	Date	Opponent	Score	Win	Loss	Save	Attendance	Record
1	April 11	@ Cubs	3–5	Vaughn	**Evans** (0–1)	—	—	0–1
2	April 12	@ Cubs	0–2	Douglas	**Cooper** (0–1)	—	—	0–2
3	April 13	@ Cubs	1–6	Ruether	**Mamaux** (0–1)	—	—	0–3
4	April 14	@ Cubs	4–2	**Miller** (1–0)	Hendrix	—	—	1–3
5	April 15	@ Reds	2–5	Toney	**Mamaux** (0–2)	—	—	1–4
6	April 16	@ Reds	8–4	**Cooper** (1–1)	Mitchell	—	—	2–4
7	April 17	@ Reds	2–3	Schneider	**Miller** (1–1)	—	—	2–5
8	April 18	@ Reds	5–7	Eller	**Mamaux** (0–3)	Mitchell	—	2–6
9	April 19	Cubs	3–10	Hendrix	**Cooper** (1–2)	—	—	2–7
10	April 20	Cubs	6–1	**Grimes** (1–0)	Demaree	—	—	3–7
11	April 21	Cubs	1–2	Vaughn	**Miller** (1–2)	—	—	3–8
12	April 22	@ Cardinals	1–4	Doak	**Mamaux** (0–4)	—	—	3–9
13	April 23	@ Cardinals	2–0	**Cooper** (2–2)	Watson	—	—	4–9
14	April 24	@ Cardinals	1–2 (10)	Ames	**Grimes** (1–1)	—	—	4–10
15	April 25	@ Cardinals	10–8 (10)	**Carlson** (1–0)	Watson	—	—	5–10
16	April 27	Reds	3–5	Toney	**Miller** (1–3)	—	—	5–11
17	April 28	Reds	2–0	**Grimes** (2–1)	Sanders	—	—	6–11
18	April 29	@ Reds	3–0	**Carlson** (2–0)	Schneider	—	—	7–11

May: 6–14 (Home: 2–3; Away: 4–11)

#	Date	Opponent	Score	Win	Loss	Save	Attendance	Record
19	May 2	Cardinals	0–4	Ames	**Grimes** (2–2)	—	—	7–12
20	May 3	Cardinals	3–4	Pierce	**Mamaux** (0–5)	Doak	—	7–13
21	May 6	@ Cubs	2–3	Vaughn	**Carlson** (2–1)	—	—	7–14
22	May 7	@ Cubs	1–4	Seaton	**Grimes** (2–3)	—	—	7–15
23	May 10	@ Braves	11–4	**Grimes** (3–3)	Nehf	—	—	8–15
24	May 11	@ Braves	2–3 (10)	Rudolph	**Jacobs** (0–1)	—	—	8–16
25	May 14	@ Phillies	2–3	Alexander	**Jacobs** (0–2)	—	—	8–17
26	May 15	@ Phillies	2–8	Mayer	**Grimes** (3–4)	—	—	8–18
27	May 16	@ Phillies	12–4	**Cooper** (3–2)	Oeschger	—	—	9–18
28	May 17	@ Phillies	6–8	Rixey	**Carlson** (2–2)	Lavender	—	9–19
29	May 18	@ Giants	1–8	Sallee	**Grimes** (3–5)	—	—	9–20
30	May 19	@ Giants	5–4	**Cooper** (4–2)	Benton	—	—	10–20
31	May 21	@ Giants	3–4	Tesreau	**Jacobs** (0–3)	—	—	10–21
32	May 22	@ Giants	2–0	**Miller** (2–3)	Anderson	—	—	11–21
33	May 24	@ Robins	0–6	Pfeffer	**Grimes** (3–6)	—	—	11–22
34	May 25	@ Robins	3–4	Cadore	**Cooper** (4–3)	—	—	11–23
35	May 26	@ Robins	1–4	Marquard	**Miller** (2–4)	—	—	11–24
36	May 30	Cubs	5–6	Douglas	**Jacobs** (0–4)	Demaree	—	11–25
37	May 30	Cubs	2–1	**Carlson** (3–2)	Demaree	—	—	12–25
38	May 31	Phillies	3–2	**Mamaux** (1–5)	Rixey	**Jacobs** (1)	—	13–25

June: 8–15 (Home: 6–14; Away: 2–1)

#	Date	Opponent	Score	Win	Loss	Save	Attendance	Record
39	June 1	Phillies	1–9	Mayer	**Miller** (2–5)	—	—	13–26
40	June 2	Phillies	1–9	Alexander	**Grimes** (3–7)	—	—	13–27
41	June 4	Phillies	5–1	**Jacobs** (1–4)	Lavender	—	—	14–27
42	June 7	Robins	3–5	Pfeffer	**Mamaux** (1–6)	—	—	14–28
43	June 8	Robins	5–4	**Miller** (3–5)	Dell	—	—	15–28
44	June 9	Braves	5–6	Tyler	**Carlson** (3–3)	—	—	15–29
45	June 11	Braves	0–2	Nehf	**Miller** (3–6)	Tyler	—	15–30
46	June 12	Braves	5–4 (11)	**Jacobs** (2–4)	Tyler	—	—	16–30
47	June 13	Giants	3–7	Anderson	**Grimes** (3–8)	—	—	16–31
48	June 14	Giants	0–2	Perritt	**Jacobs** (2–5)	—	—	16–32
49	June 16	Giants	1–4	Benton	**Miller** (3–7)	—	—	16–33
50	June 18	@ Cardinals	4–0	**Cooper** (5–3)	Packard	—	—	17–33
51	June 19	@ Cardinals	7–3 (11)	**Jacobs** (3–5)	Ames	—	—	18–33
52	June 20	@ Cardinals	4–4 (6)			—	—	18–33
53	June 21	Cubs	4–12	Seaton	**Miller** (3–8)	—	—	18–34
54	June 22	Cubs	4–3 (10)	**Cooper** (6–3)	Demaree	—	—	19–34
55	June 23	Cubs	0–2	Douglas	**Jacobs** (3–6)	—	—	19–35
56	June 23	Cubs	4–6 (10)	Hendrix	**Miller** (3–9)	Seaton	—	19–36
57	June 24	@ Cubs	1–2	Vaughn	**Mamaux** (1–7)	—	—	19–37
58	June 26	Reds	5–6	Schneider	**Cooper** (6–4)	—	—	19–38
59	June 27	Reds	5–6	Regan	**Jacobs** (3–7)	Ring	—	19–39
60	June 28	Reds	6–2	**Steele** (1–0)	Toney	—	—	20–39
61	June 29	Reds	0–1	Mitchell	**Mamaux** (1–8)	—	—	20–40
62	June 30	Reds	5–4	**Cooper** (7–4)	Ring	—	—	21–40

July: 10–23 (Home: 3–11; Away: 7–12)

#	Date	Opponent	Score	Win	Loss	Save	Attendance	Record
63	July 1	@ Reds	1–4	Toney	**Jacobs** (3–8)	—	—	21–41
64	July 1	@ Reds	1–5	Toney	**Steele** (1–1)	—	—	21–42
65	July 2	Cardinals	4–6	Horstmann	**Mamaux** (1–9)	Packard	—	21–43
66	July 3	Cardinals	6–8	Ames	**Miller** (3–10)	—	—	21–44
67	July 4	Cardinals	3–4	Packard	**Jacobs** (3–9)	Meadows	—	21–45
68	July 4	Cardinals	1–4	Doak	**Cooper** (7–5)	—	—	21–46
69	July 5	Cardinals	6–9 (11)	Ames	**Grimes** (3–9)	—	—	21–47
70	July 6	@ Phillies	8–5	**Mamaux** (2–9)	Oeschger	**Carlson** (1)	—	22–47
71	July 7	@ Phillies	4–1	**Miller** (4–10)	Alexander	**Jacobs** (2)	—	23–47
72	July 12	@ Robins	2–1	**Carlson** (4–3)	Pfeffer	—	—	24–47
73	July 13	@ Robins	0–4	Cheney	**Jacobs** (3–10)	—	—	24–48
74	July 13	@ Robins	1–2 (10)	Smith	**Grimes** (3–10)	—	—	24–49
75	July 14	@ Robins	3–5	Coombs	**Mamaux** (2–10)	—	—	24–50
76	July 14	@ Robins	0–1	Marquard	**Miller** (4–11)	—	—	24–51
77	July 16	@ Braves	7–8 (11)	Tyler	**Grimes** (3–11)	—	—	24–52
78	July 16	@ Braves	2–7	Barnes	**Jacobs** (3–11)	—	—	24–53
79	July 17	@ Braves	6–10	Nehf	**Mamaux** (2–11)	—	—	24–54
80	July 18	@ Braves	8–6	**Steele** (2–1)	Tyler	—	—	25–54
81	July 18	@ Braves	3–2	**Carlson** (5–3)	Rudolph	—	—	26–54
82	July 19	@ Braves	6–1	**Cooper** (8–5)	Barnes	—	—	27–54
83	July 20	@ Giants	0–4	Benton	**Carlson** (5–4)	—	—	27–55
84	July 21	@ Giants	3–4 (10)	Sallee	**Grimes** (3–12)	—	—	27–56
85	July 23	@ Giants	1–0	**Cooper** (9–5)	Schupp	—	—	28–56
86	July 24	@ Giants	2–6	Perritt	**Miller** (4–12)	Anderson	—	28–57
87	July 25	Robins	3–4 (13)	Smith	**Jacobs** (3–12)	—	—	28–58
88	July 26	Robins	4–1	**Carlson** (6–4)	Pfeffer	—	—	29–58
89	July 26	Robins	1–5	Cadore	**Jacobs** (3–13)	—	—	29–59
90	July 27	Robins	5–1	**Cooper** (10–5)	Coombs	—	—	30–59
91	July 28	Robins	2–6	Cheney	**Steele** (2–2)	—	—	30–60
92	July 28	Robins	2–4	Smith	**Miller** (4–13)	—	—	30–61
93	July 30	Giants	4–3	**Carlson** (7–4)	Anderson	**Cooper** (1)	—	31–61
94	July 31	Giants	7–11	Tesreau	**Cooper** (10–6)	—	—	31–62
95	July 31	Giants	3–9	Schupp	**Grimes** (3–13)	—	—	31–63

August: 8–19 (Home: 4–7; Away: 4–12)

#	Date	Opponent	Score	Win	Loss	Save	Attendance	Record
96	August 1	Giants	1–3	Perritt	**Steele** (2–3)	—	—	31–64
97	August 2	Giants	3–7	Demaree	**Miller** (4–14)	—	—	31–65
98	August 3	Braves	4–5	Nehf	**Carlson** (7–5)	—	—	31–66
99	August 4	Braves	3–6	Tyler	**Steele** (2–4)	—	—	31–67
100	August 9	Phillies	5–1	**Jacobs** (4–13)	Alexander	—	—	32–67
101	August 10	Phillies	1–0	**Cooper** (11–6)	Rixey	—	—	33–67
102	August 11	Phillies	3–4	Alexander	**Miller** (4–15)	—	—	33–68
103	August 11	Phillies	2–3	Oeschger	**Evans** (0–2)	—	—	33–69
104	August 12	@ Cubs	2–3	Vaughn	**Carlson** (7–6)	—	—	33–70
105	August 13	@ Cubs	3–7	Hendrix	**Steele** (2–5)	—	—	33–71
106	August 14	@ Cubs	2–0 (12)	**Cooper** (12–6)	Douglas	—	—	34–71
107	August 15	Reds	3–2	**Miller** (5–15)	Schneider	—	—	35–71
108	August 16	@ Phillies	3–5	Oeschger	**Jacobs** (4–14)	—	—	35–72
109	August 16	@ Phillies	0–3	Mayer	**Evans** (0–3)	—	—	35–73
110	August 17	@ Phillies	0–3	Bender	**Jacobs** (4–15)	—	—	35–74
111	August 17	@ Phillies	3–7	Rixey	**Carlson** (7–7)	—	—	35–75
112	August 18	@ Phillies	2–3 (14)	Alexander	**Cooper** (12–7)	—	—	35–76
113	August 20	@ Robins	1–0 (10)	**Miller** (6–15)	Marquard	—	—	36–76
114	August 21	@ Robins	3–3 (13)			—	—	36–76
115	August 22	@ Robins	5–6 (22)	Marquard	**Jacobs** (4–16)	—	—	36–77
116	August 23	@ Braves	1–2	Tyler	**Grimes** (3–14)	—	—	36–78
117	August 24	@ Braves	1–0	**Miller** (7–15)	Barnes	—	—	37–78
118	August 25	@ Braves	0–2	Ragan	**Steele** (2–6)	—	—	37–79
119	August 27	@ Giants	1–0	**Cooper** (13–7)	Benton	—	—	38–79
120	August 28	@ Giants	3–7	Perritt	**Grimes** (3–15)	—	—	38–80
121	August 29	@ Giants	5–6	Tesreau	**Miller** (7–16)	Sallee	—	38–81
122	August 31	Cardinals	2–0	**Jacobs** (5–16)	Doak	—	—	39–81
123	August 31	Cardinals	0–1 (5)	Ames	**Steele** (2–7)	—	—	39–82

September: 11–21 (Home: 7–15; Away: 4–6)

#	Date	Opponent	Score	Win	Loss	Save	Attendance	Record
124	September 1	Cardinals	0–1	Horstmann	**Cooper** (13–8)	—	—	39–83
125	September 1	Cardinals	0–1	Watson	**Carlson** (7–8)	—	—	39–84
126	September 2	@ Reds	8–7	**Steele** (3–7)	Mitchell	—	—	40–84
127	September 3	Reds	8–0	**Miller** (8–16)	Engel	—	—	41–84
128	September 3	Reds	5–3	**Steele** (4–7)	Schneider	—	—	42–84
129	September 4	Reds	5–4 (10)	**Cooper** (14–8)	Toney	—	—	43–84
130	September 7	Cubs	1–2	Carter	**Steele** (4–8)	—	—	43–85
131	September 8	Cubs	2–6	Vaughn	**Miller** (8–17)	—	—	43–86
132	September 9	@ Cubs	0–1	Douglas	**Cooper** (14–9)	—	—	43–87
133	September 10	@ Cardinals	1–2	Goodwin	**Jacobs** (5–17)	—	—	43–88
134	September 11	@ Cardinals	3–0	**Steele** (5–8)	Doak	—	—	44–88
135	September 11	@ Cardinals	2–5	Horstmann	**Carlson** (7–9)	—	—	44–89
136	September 12	@ Cardinals	2–1	**Miller** (9–17)	Watson	—	—	45–89
137	September 13	@ Cardinals	2–1	**Cooper** (15–9)	Meadows	—	—	46–89
138	September 15	@ Reds	6–7	Eller	**Grimes** (3–16)	—	—	46–90
139	September 16	@ Reds	2–4	Schneider	**Steele** (5–9)	—	—	46–91
140	September 16	@ Reds	2–3	Regan	**Carlson** (7–10)	—	—	46–92
141	September 17	Braves	1–4 (15)	Hughes	**Miller** (9–18)	—	—	46–93
142	September 18	Braves	3–5	Rudolph	**Cooper** (15–10)	—	—	46–94
143	September 18	Braves	0–1	Nehf	**Ponder** (0–1)	—	—	46–95
144	September 19	Braves	2–1	**Jacobs** (6–17)	Barnes	—	—	47–95
145	September 19	Braves	4–6	Scott	**Evans** (0–4)	—	—	47–96
146	September 20	Giants	9–9 (10)			—	—	47–96
147	September 21	Giants	1–3	Benton	**Steele** (5–10)	Anderson	—	47–97
148	September 22	Giants	1–2 (11)	Perritt	**Cooper** (15–11)	—	—	47–98
149	September 22	Giants	1–0	**Ponder** (1–1)	Demaree	—	—	48–98
150	September 24	Phillies	0–2	Bender	**Jacobs** (6–18)	—	—	48–99
151	September 25	Phillies	3–0	**Miller** (10–18)	Oeschger	—	—	49–99
152	September 26	Phillies	0–5	Rixey	**Carlson** (7–11)	—	—	49–100
153	September 27	Robins	10–2	**Cooper** (16–11)	Pfeffer	—	—	50–100
154	September 28	Robins	1–3	Smith	**Steele** (5–11)	—	—	50–101
155	September 29	Robins	2–3	Cadore	**Jacobs** (6–19)	—	—	50–102
156	September 29	Robins	3–7	Marquard	**Miller** (10–19)	—	—	50–103

October: 1–0 (Home: 1–0; Away: 0–0)

#	Date	Opponent	Score	Win	Loss	Save	Attendance	Record
157	October 1	Braves	2–0	**Cooper** (17–11)	Scott	—	—	51–103

Legend: = Win = Loss = Tie
Bold = Pirates team member

=== Roster ===
1917 Pittsburgh Pirates
**Roster**
**Pitchers**: Hal Carlson; Wilbur Cooper; Bill Evans; Burleigh Grimes; Elmer Jacobs; Al Mamaux; Frank Miller; Elmer Ponder; Bob Steele; **Catchers**: Fred Blackwell; William Fischer; Walter Schmidt; Red Smith; Bill Wagner	**Infielders**: Doug Baird; Tony Boeckel; Bunny Brief; Howdy Caton; Adam DeBus; Billy Gleason; George Kelly; Alex McCarthy; Ray Miller; Fritz Mollwitz; Jake Pitler; Arch Reilly; Honus Wagner; Chuck Ward; Hooks Warner; Bill Webb; Harry Wolfe	**Outfielders**: Jesse Altenburg; Carson Bigbee; Max Carey; Don Flinn; Bill Hinchman; Charlie Jackson; Lee King; Wildfire Schulte; Joe Wilhoit; **Other batters**: Ben Shaw	**Manager**: Hugo Bezdek; Nixey Callahan; Honus Wagner

== Player stats ==
=== Batting ===
==== Starters by position ====
Note: Pos = Position; G = Games played; AB = At bats; H = Hits; Avg. = Batting average; HR = Home runs; RBI = Runs batted in

Pos	Player	G	AB	H	Avg.	HR	RBI
C	William Fischer	95	245	70	.286	3	25
1B	Honus Wagner	74	230	61	.265	0	24
2B	Jake Pitler	109	382	89	.233	0	23
SS	Chuck Ward	125	423	100	.236	0	43
3B	Tony Boeckel	64	219	58	.265	0	23
OF	Carson Bigbee	133	469	112	.239	0	21
OF	Lee King	111	381	95	.249	1	35
OF	Max Carey	155	588	174	.296	1	51

==== Other batters ====
Note: G = Games played; AB = At bats; H = Hits; Avg. = Batting average; HR = Home runs; RBI = Runs batted in

Player	G	AB	H	Avg.	HR	RBI
Bill Hinchman	69	244	46	.189	2	29
Walter Schmidt	72	183	45	.246	0	17
Bill Wagner	53	151	31	.205	0	9
Alex McCarthy	49	151	33	.219	0	8
Fritz Mollwitz	36	140	36	.257	0	12
Doug Baird	43	135	35	.259	0	18
Adam DeBus	38	131	30	.229	0	7
Charlie Jackson	41	121	29	.240	0	1
Bunny Brief	36	115	25	.217	2	11
Frank Schulte	30	103	22	.214	0	7
Howdy Caton	14	57	12	.211	0	4
Billy Gleason	13	42	7	.167	0	0
Don Flinn	14	37	11	.297	0	1
Ray Miller	6	27	4	.148	0	0
High Pockets Kelly	8	23	2	.087	0	0
Red Smith	11	21	3	.143	0	2
Jesse Altenburg	11	17	3	.176	0	3
Bill Webb	5	15	3	.200	0	0
Joe Wilhoit	9	10	2	.200	0	0
Fred Blackwell	3	10	2	.200	0	2
Harry Wolfe	3	5	0	.000	0	0
Hooks Warner	3	5	1	.200	0	0
Ben Shaw	2	2	0	.000	0	0
Arch Reilly	1	0	0	----	0	0

=== Pitching ===
==== Starting pitchers ====
Note: G = Games pitched; IP = Innings pitched; W = Wins; L = Losses; ERA = Earned run average; SO = Strikeouts

Player	G	IP	W	L	ERA	SO
Wilbur Cooper	40	297.2	17	11	2.36	99
Elmer Jacobs	38	227.1	6	19	2.81	58
Frank Miller	38	224.0	10	19	3.13	92
Bob Steele	27	179.2	5	11	2.76	82
Al Mamaux	16	85.2	2	11	5.25	22
Elmer Ponder	3	21.1	1	1	1.69	11

==== Other pitchers ====
Note: G = Games pitched; IP = Innings pitched; W = Wins; L = Losses; ERA = Earned run average; SO = Strikeouts

Player	G	IP	W	L	ERA	SO
Burleigh Grimes	37	194.0	3	16	3.53	72
Hal Carlson	34	161.1	7	11	2.90	68
Bill Evans	8	26.2	0	4	3.38	5
