= 1917 St. Louis Cardinals season =

Major League Baseball season

1917 St. Louis Cardinals
- League: National League
- Ballpark: Cardinal Field
- City: St. Louis, Missouri
- Record: 82–70 (.539)
- League place: 3rd
- Owners: Sam Breadon
- Managers: Miller Huggins

The 1917 St. Louis Cardinals season was the team's 36th season in St. Louis, Missouri and the 26th season in the National League. The Cardinals went 82–70 during the season and finished third in the National League.

== Regular season ==
Rogers Hornsby began to establish himself as an elite hitter. Hornsby had a .327 batting average which was second in the league. He led the league in triples (17), total bases (253), and slugging percentage (.484).

=== Season standings ===
National League
Team	W	L	Pct.	GB	Home	Road
New York Giants	98	56	.636	—	50‍–‍28	48‍–‍28
Philadelphia Phillies	87	65	.572	10	46‍–‍29	41‍–‍36
St. Louis Cardinals	82	70	.539	15	38‍–‍38	44‍–‍32
Cincinnati Reds	78	76	.506	20	39‍–‍38	39‍–‍38
Chicago Cubs	74	80	.481	24	35‍–‍42	39‍–‍38
Boston Braves	72	81	.471	25½	35‍–‍42	37‍–‍39
Brooklyn Robins	70	81	.464	26½	36‍–‍38	34‍–‍43
Pittsburgh Pirates	51	103	.331	47	25‍–‍53	26‍–‍50

=== Record vs. opponents ===
1917 National League record Sources:
Team	BSN	BRO	CHC	CIN	NYG	PHI	PIT	STL
Boston	—	13–9–1	11–11	10–12–2	7–15	11–11	14–8	6–15–1
Brooklyn	9–13–1	—	7–15	10–12	9–13–2	9–11–1	16–6–1	10–11
Chicago	11–11	15–7	—	8–14–1	7–15–1	6–16–1	17–5	10–12
Cincinnati	12–10–2	12–10	14–8–1	—	11–11	8–14	12–10	9–13
New York	15–7	13–9–2	15–7–1	11–11	—	14–8	16–6–1	14–8
Philadelphia	11–11	11–9–1	16–6–1	14–8	8–14	—	14–8	13–9
Pittsburgh	8–14	6–16–1	5–17	10–12	6–16–1	8–14	—	8–14–1
St. Louis	15–6–1	11–10	12–10	13–9	8–14	9–13	14–8–1	—

=== Roster ===
1917 St. Louis Cardinals
Roster
Pitchers: Red Ames; Bill Doak; Marv Goodwin; Bruce Hitt; Oscar Horstmann; Jakie May; Lee Meadows; Tim Murchison; Lou North; Gene Packard; George Pierce; Bob Steele; Milt Watson	Catchers: John Brock; Mike González; Paddy Livingston; Jack Roche; Frank Snyder; Infielders: Doug Baird; Bruno Betzel; Tony DeFate; Rogers Hornsby; Ike McAuley; Dots Miller; Gene Paulette; Fred Smith; Bobby Wallace	Outfielders: Bob Bescher; Walton Cruise; Tom Long; Jack Smith; Red Smyth; Stuffy Stewart	Manager: Miller Huggins; Coaches: Charley O'Leary

== Player stats ==
=== Batting ===
==== Starters by position ====
Note: Pos = Position; G = Games played; AB = At bats; H = Hits; Avg. = Batting average; HR = Home runs; RBI = Runs batted in

Pos	Player	G	AB	H	Avg.	HR	RBI
C	Frank Snyder	115	313	74	.236	1	33
1B	Gene Paulette	95	332	88	.265	0	34
2B	Dots Miller	148	544	135	.248	2	45
SS	Rogers Hornsby	145	523	171	.327	8	66
3B	Doug Baird	104	364	92	.253	0	24
OF	Jack Smith	137	462	137	.297	3	34
OF	Tom Long	144	530	123	.232	3	41
OF	Walton Cruise	153	529	156	.295	5	59

==== Other batters ====
Note: G = Games played; AB = At bats; H = Hits; Avg. = Batting average; HR = Home runs; RBI = Runs batted in

Player	G	AB	H	Avg.	HR	RBI
Bruno Betzel	106	328	71	.216	1	17
Mike González	106	290	76	.262	1	28
Fred Smith	56	165	30	.182	1	17
Bob Bescher	42	110	17	.155	1	8
Red Smyth	38	72	15	.208	0	4
Paddy Livingston	7	20	4	.200	0	2
John Brock	7	15	6	.400	0	2
Tony DeFate	14	14	2	.143	0	1
Bobby Wallace	8	10	1	.100	0	2
Stuffy Stewart	13	9	0	.000	0	0
Ike McAuley	3	7	2	.286	0	1
Jack Roche	1	1	0	.000	0	0

=== Pitching ===
==== Starting pitchers ====
Note: G = Games pitched; IP = Innings pitched; W = Wins; L = Losses; ERA = Earned run average; SO = Strikeouts

Player	G	IP	W	L	ERA	SO
Bill Doak	44	281.1	16	20	3.10	111
Lee Meadows	43	265.2	15	9	3.08	100
Marv Goodwin	14	85.1	6	4	2.21	38

==== Other pitchers ====
Note: G = Games pitched; IP = Innings pitched; W = Wins; L = Losses; ERA = Earned run average; SO = Strikeouts

Player	G	IP	W	L	ERA	SO
Red Ames	43	209.0	15	10	2.71	62
Milt Watson	41	161.1	10	13	3.51	45
Gene Packard	34	153.1	9	6	2.47	44
Oscar Horstmann	35	138.2	9	4	3.44	50
Bob Steele	12	42.0	1	3	3.21	23

==== Relief pitchers ====
Note: G = Games pitched; W = Wins; L = Losses; SV = Saves; ERA = Earned run average; SO = Strikeouts

Player	G	W	L	SV	ERA	SO
Jakie May	15	0	0	0	3.38	18
Lou North	5	0	0	0	3.97	4
George Pierce	5	1	1	0	3.48	4
Bruce Hitt	2	0	0	0	9.00	1
Tim Murchison	1	0	0	0	0.00	2
