= 1917 New York Giants season =

1917 New York Giants
- National League champions
- League: National League
- Ballpark: Polo Grounds
- City: New York City
- Record: 98–56 (.636)
- League place: 1st
- Owners: Harry Hempstead
- Managers: John McGraw

The 1917 New York Giants season was the franchise's 35th season. It involved the Giants winning the National League pennant for the first time in four years. The team went on to lose to the Chicago White Sox in the World Series, four games to two.

== Regular season ==
New York had no real superstars, but they had a balanced roster and led the league in both runs scored and fewest runs allowed.

Third baseman Heinie Zimmerman had a fine offensive season, pacing the circuit in runs batted in, but suffered through an embarrassment in the World Series. A third baseman, Zimmerman had the unfortunate task of chasing White Sox star Eddie Collins across home plate when there was no one to throw to. The Giants lost in six games.

Between July 31 and August 10, the Giants hit at least one triple in each of 11 consecutive games, the longest such streak in franchise history (considering records from 1914 onwards).

=== Season standings ===
National League
Team	W	L	Pct.	GB	Home	Road
New York Giants	98	56	.636	—	50‍–‍28	48‍–‍28
Philadelphia Phillies	87	65	.572	10	46‍–‍29	41‍–‍36
St. Louis Cardinals	82	70	.539	15	38‍–‍38	44‍–‍32
Cincinnati Reds	78	76	.506	20	39‍–‍38	39‍–‍38
Chicago Cubs	74	80	.481	24	35‍–‍42	39‍–‍38
Boston Braves	72	81	.471	25½	35‍–‍42	37‍–‍39
Brooklyn Robins	70	81	.464	26½	36‍–‍38	34‍–‍43
Pittsburgh Pirates	51	103	.331	47	25‍–‍53	26‍–‍50

=== Record vs. opponents ===
1917 National League record Sources:
Team	BSN	BRO	CHC	CIN	NYG	PHI	PIT	STL
Boston	—	13–9–1	11–11	10–12–2	7–15	11–11	14–8	6–15–1
Brooklyn	9–13–1	—	7–15	10–12	9–13–2	9–11–1	16–6–1	10–11
Chicago	11–11	15–7	—	8–14–1	7–15–1	6–16–1	17–5	10–12
Cincinnati	12–10–2	12–10	14–8–1	—	11–11	8–14	12–10	9–13
New York	15–7	13–9–2	15–7–1	11–11	—	14–8	16–6–1	14–8
Philadelphia	11–11	11–9–1	16–6–1	14–8	8–14	—	14–8	13–9
Pittsburgh	8–14	6–16–1	5–17	10–12	6–16–1	8–14	—	8–14–1
St. Louis	15–6–1	11–10	12–10	13–9	8–14	9–13	14–8–1	—

=== Notable transactions ===
- April 23, 1917: Jim Thorpe was purchased from the Giants by the Cincinnati Reds.
- August 18, 1917: Jim Thorpe was returned to the Giants by the Cincinnati Reds.

=== Roster ===
1917 New York Giants
Roster
Pitchers: Fred Anderson; Rube Benton; Al Demaree; Jim Middleton; Pol Perritt; Slim Sallee; Ferdie Schupp; George Smith; Ad Swigler; Jeff Tesreau	Catchers: George Gibson; Ernie Krueger; Lew McCarty; Jack Onslow; Bill Rariden; Infielders: Al Baird; Art Fletcher; Ed Hemingway; Buck Herzog; Walter Holke; Pete Kilduff; Hans Lobert; José Rodríguez; Jimmy Smith; Heinie Zimmerman	Outfielders: George Burns; Benny Kauff; George Kelly; Red Murray; Dave Robertson; Jim Thorpe; Joe Wilhoit; Ross Youngs	Manager: John McGraw

== Player stats ==
=== Batting ===
==== Starters by position ====
Note: Pos = Position; G = Games played; AB = At bats; H = Hits; Avg. = Batting average; HR = Home runs; RBI = Runs batted in

Pos	Player	G	AB	H	Avg.	HR	RBI
C	Bill Rariden	101	266	72	.271	0	25
1B	Walter Holke	153	527	146	.277	2	55
2B	Buck Herzog	114	417	98	.235	2	31
3B	Heinie Zimmerman	150	585	174	.297	5	102
SS	Art Fletcher	151	557	145	.260	4	62
OF	Benny Kauff	153	559	172	.308	5	68
OF	Dave Robertson	142	532	138	.259	12	55
OF	George Burns	152	597	180	.302	5	45

==== Other batters ====
Note: G = Games played; AB = At bats; H = Hits; Avg. = Batting average; HR = Home runs; RBI = Runs batted in

Player	G	AB	H	Avg.	HR	RBI
Lew McCarty	56	162	40	.247	2	20
Jimmy Smith	36	96	22	.229	0	8
George Gibson	35	82	14	.171	0	5
Pete Kilduff	31	78	16	.205	1	13
Jim Thorpe	26	57	11	.193	0	4
Hans Lobert	50	52	10	.192	1	4
Joe Wilhoit	34	50	17	.340	0	9
Ross Youngs	7	26	9	.346	0	1
Ed Hemingway	7	25	8	.320	0	2
Al Baird	10	24	7	.292	0	4
Red Murray	22	22	1	.045	0	3
José Rodríguez	7	20	4	.200	0	3
Ernie Krueger	8	10	0	.000	0	0
Jack Onslow	9	8	2	.250	0	0
George Kelly	11	7	0	.000	0	0

=== Pitching ===
==== Starting pitchers ====
Note: G = Games pitched; IP = Innings pitched; W = Wins; L = Losses; ERA = Earned run average; SO = Strikeouts

Player	G	IP	W	L	ERA	SO
Ferdie Schupp	36	272.0	21	7	1.95	147
Slim Sallee	34	215.2	18	7	2.17	54
Pol Perritt	35	215.0	17	7	1.88	72
Rube Benton	35	215.0	15	9	2.72	70
Jeff Tesreau	33	183.2	13	8	3.09	85
Al Demaree	15	78.1	4	5	2.64	23
Ad Swigler	1	6.0	0	1	6.00	4

==== Other pitchers ====
Note: G = Games pitched; IP = Innings pitched; W = Wins; L = Losses; ERA = Earned run average; SO = Strikeouts

Player	G	IP	W	L	ERA	SO
Fred Anderson	38	162.0	8	8	1.44	69

==== Relief pitchers ====
Note: G = Games pitched; W = Wins; L = Losses; SV = Saves; ERA = Earned run average; SO = Strikeouts

Player	G	W	L	SV	ERA	SO
George Smith	14	0	3	0	2.84	16
Jim Middleton	13	1	1	1	2.75	9

== Awards and honors ==
=== League top five finishers ===
Fred Anderson

- MLB leader in ERA (1.44)

George Burns

- NL leader in runs scored (103)
- #2 in NL in stolen bases (40)
- #3 in NL in on-base percentage (.380)

Benny Kauff

- #3 in NL in runs scored (89)
- #3 in NL in stolen bases (30)
- #4 in NL in batting average (.308)

Pol Perritt

- #3 in NL in ERA (1.88)

Dave Robertson

- MLB leader in home runs (12)

Ferdie Schupp

- #4 in NL in wins (21)
- #4 in NL in ERA (1.95)
- #4 in NL in strikeouts (147)

Heinie Zimmerman

- NL leader in RBI (102)

== 1917 World Series ==
=== Game 1 ===
October 6, 1917, at Comiskey Park in Chicago

Team	1	2	3	4	5	6	7	8	9	R	H	E
New York	0	0	0	0	1	0	0	0	0	1	7	1
Chicago	0	0	1	1	0	0	0	0	x	2	7	1
W: Eddie Cicotte (1–0) L: Slim Sallee (0–1)
HR: CHI – Happy Felsch (1)

=== Game 2 ===
October 7, 1917, at Comiskey Park in Chicago

Team	1	2	3	4	5	6	7	8	9	R	H	E
New York	0	2	0	0	0	0	0	0	0	2	8	1
Chicago	0	2	0	0	5	0	0	0	x	7	14	1
W: Red Faber (1–0) L: Fred Anderson (0–1)

=== Game 3 ===
October 10, 1917, at the Polo Grounds in New York City

Team	1	2	3	4	5	6	7	8	9	R	H	E
Chicago	0	0	0	0	0	0	0	0	0	0	5	3
New York	0	0	0	2	0	0	0	0	x	2	8	2
W: Rube Benton (1–0) L: Eddie Cicotte (1–1)

=== Game 4 ===
October 11, 1917, at the Polo Grounds in New York City

Team	1	2	3	4	5	6	7	8	9	R	H	E
Chicago	0	0	0	0	0	0	0	0	0	0	7	0
New York	0	0	0	1	1	0	1	2	x	5	10	1
W: Ferdie Schupp (1–0) L: Red Faber (1–1)
HR: NYG – Benny Kauff (1), Benny Kauff (2)

=== Game 5 ===
October 13, 1917, at Comiskey Park in Chicago

Team	1	2	3	4	5	6	7	8	9	R	H	E
New York	2	0	0	2	0	0	1	0	0	5	12	3
Chicago	0	0	1	0	0	1	3	3	x	8	14	6
W: Red Faber (2–1) L: Slim Sallee (0–2)

=== Game 6 ===
October 15, 1917, at the Polo Grounds in New York City

Team	1	2	3	4	5	6	7	8	9	R	H	E
Chicago	0	0	0	3	0	0	0	0	1	4	7	1
New York	0	0	0	0	2	0	0	0	0	2	6	3
W: Red Faber (3–1) L: Rube Benton (1–1)
