= 1917 Boston Braves season =

1917 Boston Braves
- League: National League
- Ballpark: Braves Field
- City: Boston, Massachusetts
- Record: 72–81 (.471)
- League place: 6th
- Owners: Percy Haughton
- Managers: George Stallings

The 1917 Boston Braves season was the 47th season of the franchise. The Braves finished sixth in the National League with a record of 72 wins and 81 losses.

== Regular season ==
=== Season standings ===
National League
Team	W	L	Pct.	GB	Home	Road
New York Giants	98	56	.636	—	50‍–‍28	48‍–‍28
Philadelphia Phillies	87	65	.572	10	46‍–‍29	41‍–‍36
St. Louis Cardinals	82	70	.539	15	38‍–‍38	44‍–‍32
Cincinnati Reds	78	76	.506	20	39‍–‍38	39‍–‍38
Chicago Cubs	74	80	.481	24	35‍–‍42	39‍–‍38
Boston Braves	72	81	.471	25½	35‍–‍42	37‍–‍39
Brooklyn Robins	70	81	.464	26½	36‍–‍38	34‍–‍43
Pittsburgh Pirates	51	103	.331	47	25‍–‍53	26‍–‍50

=== Record vs. opponents ===
1917 National League record Sources:
Team	BSN	BRO	CHC	CIN	NYG	PHI	PIT	STL
Boston	—	13–9–1	11–11	10–12–2	7–15	11–11	14–8	6–15–1
Brooklyn	9–13–1	—	7–15	10–12	9–13–2	9–11–1	16–6–1	10–11
Chicago	11–11	15–7	—	8–14–1	7–15–1	6–16–1	17–5	10–12
Cincinnati	12–10–2	12–10	14–8–1	—	11–11	8–14	12–10	9–13
New York	15–7	13–9–2	15–7–1	11–11	—	14–8	16–6–1	14–8
Philadelphia	11–11	11–9–1	16–6–1	14–8	8–14	—	14–8	13–9
Pittsburgh	8–14	6–16–1	5–17	10–12	6–16–1	8–14	—	8–14–1
St. Louis	15–6–1	11–10	12–10	13–9	8–14	9–13	14–8–1	—

=== Notable transactions ===
- July 11, 1917: Mike Massey was released by the Braves.

=== Roster ===
1917 Boston Braves roster
Roster
Pitchers: Frank Allen; Jesse Barnes; Cal Crum; Tom Hughes; Art Nehf; Pat Ragan; Ed Reulbach; Dick Rudolph; Jack Scott; Lefty Tyler; Ed Walsh	Catchers: Hank Gowdy; Fred Jacklitsch; Chief Meyers; Art Rico; Walt Tragesser; Infielders: Sam Covington; Johnny Evers; Ed Fitzpatrick; Ed Konetchy; Rabbit Maranville; Mike Massey; Johnny Rawlings; Hank Schreiber; Red Smith	Outfielders: Fred Bailey; Larry Chappell; Zip Collins; Joe Kelly; Sherry Magee; Ray Powell; Wally Rehg; George Twombly; Joe Wilhoit	Manager: George Stallings

== Player stats ==
=== Batting ===
==== Starters by position ====
Note: Pos = Position; G = Games played; AB = At bats; H = Hits; Avg. = Batting average; HR = Home runs; RBI = Runs batted in

Pos	Player	G	AB	H	Avg.	HR	RBI
C	Walt Tragesser	98	297	66	.222	0	25
1B	Ed Konetchy	130	474	129	.272	2	54
2B	Johnny Rawlings	122	371	95	.256	2	31
SS	Rabbit Maranville	142	561	146	.260	3	43
3B	Red Smith	147	505	149	.295	2	62
OF	Wally Rehg	87	341	92	.270	1	31
OF	Ray Powell	88	357	97	.272	4	30
OF	Joe Kelly	116	445	99	.222	3	36

==== Other batters ====
Note: G = Games played; AB = At bats; H = Hits; Avg. = Batting average; HR = Home runs; RBI = Runs batted in

Player	G	AB	H	Avg.	HR	RBI
Sherry Magee	72	246	63	.256	1	29
Joe Wilhoit	54	186	51	.274	1	10
Ed Fitzpatrick	63	178	45	.253	0	17
Hank Gowdy	49	154	33	.214	0	14
Fred Bailey	50	110	21	.191	1	5
George Twombley	32	102	19	.186	0	9
Mike Massey	31	91	18	.198	0	2
Johnny Evers	24	83	16	.193	0	0
Chief Meyers	25	68	17	.250	0	4
Sam Covington	17	66	13	.197	1	10
Zip Collins	9	27	4	.148	0	2
Art Rico	13	14	4	.286	0	2
Hank Schreiber	2	7	2	.286	0	0
Larry Chappell	4	2	0	.000	0	1
Fred Jacklitsch	1	0	0	----	0	0

=== Pitching ===
==== Starting pitchers ====
Note: G = Games pitched; IP = Innings pitched; W = Wins; L = Losses; ERA = Earned run average; SO = Strikeouts

Player	G	IP	W	L	ERA	SO
Jesse Barnes	50	295.0	13	21	2.68	107
Dick Rudolph	31	242.2	13	14	3.41	96
Lefty Tyler	32	239.0	14	12	2.52	98
Tom Hughes	11	74.0	5	3	1.95	30

==== Other pitchers ====
Note: G = Games pitched; IP = Innings pitched; W = Wins; L = Losses; ERA = Earned run average; SO = Strikeouts

Player	G	IP	W	L	ERA	SO
Art Nehf	38	233.1	17	8	2.16	101
Pat Ragan	30	147.2	6	9	2.93	61
Frank Allen	29	112.0	3	11	3.94	56
Jack Scott	7	39.2	1	2	1.82	21
Ed Reulbach	5	22.1	0	1	2.82	9
Ed Walsh	4	18.0	0	1	3.50	4

==== Relief pitchers ====
Note: G = Games pitched; W = Wins; L = Losses; SV = Saves; ERA = Earned run average; SO = Strikeouts

Player	G	W	L	SV	ERA	SO
Cal Crum	1	0	0	0	0.00	0
