= 1917 Chicago Cubs season =

1917 Chicago Cubs
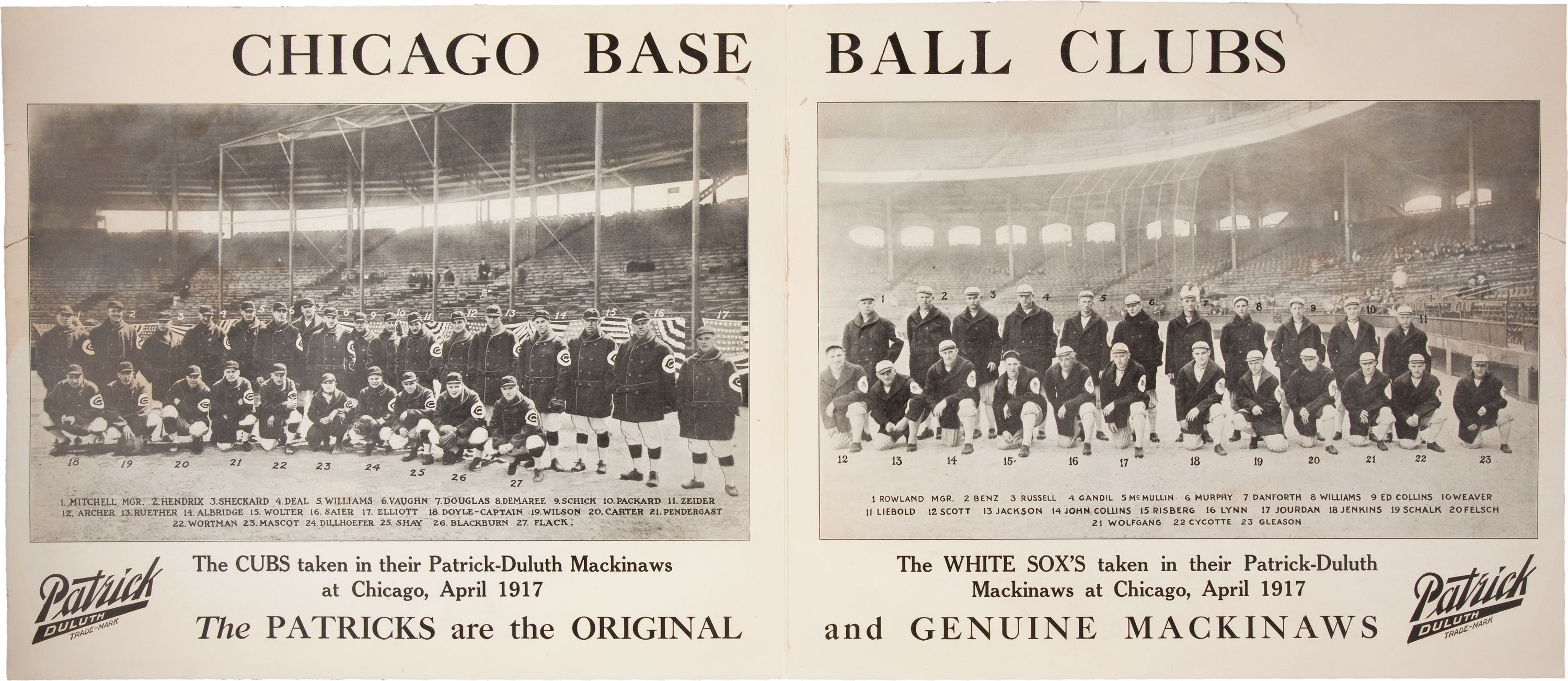
- 1917 Chicago Cubs & White Sox Advertising Sign
- League: National League
- Ballpark: Weeghman Park
- City: Chicago
- Record: 74–80 (.481)
- League place: 5th
- Owners: Charles Weeghman
- Managers: Fred Mitchell

The 1917 Chicago Cubs season was the 46th season of the Chicago Cubs franchise, the 42nd in the National League and the second at Wrigley Field (then known as "Weeghman Park"). The Cubs finished fifth in the National League with a record of 74–80, 24 games behind the New York Giants.

== Regular season ==
- May 2, 1917: For the first, and to date, the only time in major league history, a regulation nine innings was played at Wrigley Field (known in 1917 as Weeghman Park) without either team logging a hit. Fred Toney of the Cincinnati Reds and Hippo Vaughn of the Cubs dueled for 9 hitless innings. In the top of the tenth, Reds outfielder Jim Thorpe drove in the winning run in the 10th inning. The Reds scored on a couple of hits and an error after Vaughn had retired the first batter, while Toney continued to hold the Cubs hitless in the bottom of the inning, winning the game for the Reds.

=== Season standings ===
National League
| Team | W | L | Pct. | GB | Home | Road |
|---|---|---|---|---|---|---|
| New York Giants | 98 | 56 | .636 | — | 50‍–‍28 | 48‍–‍28 |
| Philadelphia Phillies | 87 | 65 | .572 | 10 | 46‍–‍29 | 41‍–‍36 |
| St. Louis Cardinals | 82 | 70 | .539 | 15 | 38‍–‍38 | 44‍–‍32 |
| Cincinnati Reds | 78 | 76 | .506 | 20 | 39‍–‍38 | 39‍–‍38 |
| Chicago Cubs | 74 | 80 | .481 | 24 | 35‍–‍42 | 39‍–‍38 |
| Boston Braves | 72 | 81 | .471 | 25½ | 35‍–‍42 | 37‍–‍39 |
| Brooklyn Robins | 70 | 81 | .464 | 26½ | 36‍–‍38 | 34‍–‍43 |
| Pittsburgh Pirates | 51 | 103 | .331 | 47 | 25‍–‍53 | 26‍–‍50 |

=== Record vs. opponents ===
1917 National League record Sources:
| Team | BSN | BRO | CHC | CIN | NYG | PHI | PIT | STL |
|---|---|---|---|---|---|---|---|---|
| Boston | — | 13–9–1 | 11–11 | 10–12–2 | 7–15 | 11–11 | 14–8 | 6–15–1 |
| Brooklyn | 9–13–1 | — | 7–15 | 10–12 | 9–13–2 | 9–11–1 | 16–6–1 | 10–11 |
| Chicago | 11–11 | 15–7 | — | 8–14–1 | 7–15–1 | 6–16–1 | 17–5 | 10–12 |
| Cincinnati | 12–10–2 | 12–10 | 14–8–1 | — | 11–11 | 8–14 | 12–10 | 9–13 |
| New York | 15–7 | 13–9–2 | 15–7–1 | 11–11 | — | 14–8 | 16–6–1 | 14–8 |
| Philadelphia | 11–11 | 11–9–1 | 16–6–1 | 14–8 | 8–14 | — | 14–8 | 13–9 |
| Pittsburgh | 8–14 | 6–16–1 | 5–17 | 10–12 | 6–16–1 | 8–14 | — | 8–14–1 |
| St. Louis | 15–6–1 | 11–10 | 12–10 | 13–9 | 8–14 | 9–13 | 14–8–1 | — |

=== Notable transactions ===
- September 20, 1917: Fred Lear was drafted by the Cubs from the Bridgeport Americans in the 1917 rule 5 draft.

== Roster ==
1917 Chicago Cubs
Roster
| Pitchers: Vic Aldridge; Paul Carter; Al Demaree; Phil Douglas; Claude Hendrix; Gene Packard; Mike Prendergast; Dutch Ruether; Tom Seaton; Hippo Vaughn; Roy Walker; Harry Weaver | Catchers: Pickles Dillhoefer; Rowdy Elliott; Bob O'Farrell; Art Wilson; Infielders: Charlie Deal; Larry Doyle; Paddy Driscoll; Herb Hunter; Pete Kilduff; Roy Leslie; Fred Merkle; Charlie Pechous; Vic Saier; Chuck Wortman; Rollie Zeider | Outfielders: Turner Barber; Max Flack; Les Mann; William Marriott; Morrie Schick; Cy Williams; Harry Wolfe; Harry Wolter; Other batters: Jimmy Archer; Earl Blackburn | Manager: Fred Mitchell |

== Player stats ==
=== Batting ===
==== Starters by position ====
Note: Pos = Position; G = Games played; AB = At bats; H = Hits; Avg. = Batting average; HR = Home runs; RBI = Runs batted in

| Pos | Player | G | AB | H | Avg. | HR | RBI |
|---|---|---|---|---|---|---|---|
| C | Art Wilson | 81 | 211 | 45 | .213 | 2 | 25 |
| 1B | Fred Merkle | 146 | 549 | 146 | .266 | 3 | 57 |
| 2B | Larry Doyle | 135 | 476 | 121 | .254 | 6 | 61 |
| SS | Chuck Wortman | 75 | 190 | 33 | .174 | 0 | 9 |
| 3B | Charlie Deal | 135 | 449 | 114 | .254 | 0 | 47 |
| OF | Cy Williams | 138 | 468 | 113 | .241 | 5 | 42 |
| OF | Leslie Mann | 117 | 444 | 121 | .273 | 1 | 44 |
| OF | Max Flack | 131 | 447 | 111 | .248 | 0 | 21 |

==== Other batters ====
Note: G = Games played; AB = At bats; H = Hits; Avg. = Batting average; HR = Home runs; RBI = Runs batted in

| Player | G | AB | H | Avg. | HR | RBI |
|---|---|---|---|---|---|---|
| Rollie Zeider | 108 | 354 | 86 | .243 | 0 | 27 |
| Harry Wolter | 117 | 353 | 88 | .249 | 0 | 28 |
| Rowdy Elliott | 85 | 223 | 56 | .251 | 0 | 28 |
| Pete Kilduff | 56 | 202 | 56 | .277 | 0 | 15 |
| Pickles Dillhoefer | 42 | 95 | 12 | .126 | 0 | 8 |
| Dutch Ruether | 31 | 44 | 12 | .273 | 0 | 11 |
| Charlie Pechous | 13 | 41 | 10 | .244 | 0 | 1 |
| Morrie Schick | 14 | 34 | 5 | .147 | 0 | 3 |
| Paddy Driscoll | 13 | 28 | 3 | .107 | 0 | 3 |
| Turner Barber | 7 | 28 | 6 | .214 | 0 | 2 |
| Vic Saier | 6 | 21 | 5 | .238 | 0 | 2 |
| Roy Leslie | 7 | 19 | 4 | .211 | 0 | 1 |
| Bob O'Farrell | 3 | 8 | 3 | .375 | 0 | 1 |
| William Marriott | 3 | 6 | 0 | .000 | 0 | 0 |
| Harry Wolfe | 9 | 5 | 2 | .400 | 0 | 1 |
| Herb Hunter | 3 | 3 | 0 | .000 | 0 | 0 |
| Earl Blackburn | 2 | 2 | 0 | .000 | 0 | 0 |
| Jimmy Archer | 2 | 2 | 0 | .000 | 0 | 0 |

=== Pitching ===
==== Starting pitchers ====
Note: G = Games pitched; IP = Innings pitched; W = Wins; L = Losses; ERA = Earned run average; SO = Strikeouts

| Player | G | IP | W | L | ERA | SO |
|---|---|---|---|---|---|---|
| Hippo Vaughn | 41 | 295.2 | 23 | 13 | 2.01 | 195 |
| Phil Douglas | 51 | 293.1 | 14 | 20 | 2.55 | 151 |
| Al Demaree | 24 | 141.1 | 5 | 9 | 2.55 | 43 |

==== Other pitchers ====
Note: G = Games pitched; IP = Innings pitched; W = Wins; L = Losses; ERA = Earned run average; SO = Strikeouts

| Player | G | IP | W | L | ERA | SO |
|---|---|---|---|---|---|---|
| Claude Hendrix | 40 | 215.0 | 10 | 12 | 2.60 | 81 |
| Paul Carter | 23 | 113.1 | 5 | 8 | 3.26 | 34 |
| Vic Aldridge | 30 | 106.2 | 6 | 6 | 3.12 | 44 |
| Mike Prendergast | 35 | 99.1 | 3 | 6 | 3.35 | 43 |
| Tom Seaton | 16 | 74.2 | 5 | 4 | 2.53 | 27 |
| Dutch Ruether | 10 | 36.1 | 2 | 0 | 2.48 | 3 |
| Harry Weaver | 4 | 19.2 | 1 | 1 | 2.75 | 8 |
| Roy Walker | 2 | 7.0 | 0 | 1 | 3.86 | 4 |

==== Relief pitchers ====
Note: G = Games pitched; W = Wins; L = Losses; SV = Saves; ERA = Earned run average; SO = Strikeouts

| Player | G | W | L | SV | ERA | SO |
|---|---|---|---|---|---|---|
| Gene Packard | 2 | 0 | 0 | 0 | 10.80 | 1 |
