= Bill Webb (second baseman) =

American baseball player (1895–1943)

- Second baseman
- Born: June 25, 1895; Chicago, Illinois, U.S.
- Died: January 12, 1943 (aged 47); Chicago, Illinois, U.S.
- Batted: Right Threw: Right

MLB debut
- September 17, 1917, for the Pittsburgh Pirates

Last MLB appearance
- October 1, 1917, for the Pittsburgh Pirates

MLB statistics
- Batting average: .200
- Home runs: 0
- Runs batted in: 0
- Stats at Baseball Reference

Teams
- Pittsburgh Pirates (1917)

William Joseph Webb (June 25, 1895 – January 12, 1943) was an American professional baseball player, coach, front-office executive and manager. Although he appeared in only five Major League games as a second baseman for the 1917 Pittsburgh Pirates, Webb spent his life in baseball and served the Chicago White Sox as a big-league coach (1935–39) and farm system director (1940 until his death). The Chicago native was listed as 5 feet 10 inches (1.78 m) tall and 161 pounds (73 kg) during his playing days. He batted and threw right-handed.

Webb's playing career lasted for 14 seasons, beginning in 1916 and ending in 1930, with 1918 missed during World War I. His brief trial (five games, including four starts at second base) with the Pirates occurred during the last two weeks of the 1917 season. Webb went hitless in his first four games and 11 MLB at bats. However, in his fifth and final game, on October 1, he went three for four (all singles) against Jack Scott of the Boston Braves and scored a run, helping the Pirates beat Boston, 2–0, at Forbes Field.

Webb resumed his minor league career in 1919 and spent the entire decade of the 1920s in the top-level International League, batting over .300 seven times. He was the player-manager of the Buffalo Bisons in 1924–25. In 1930, he resumed his managing career, and after two seasons as skipper of the Class A Galveston Buccaneers of the Texas League, winning the 1934 league title, he joined the White Sox. He coached at third base for Jimmy Dykes for five seasons before moving into their front office as minor league director.

He died at age 47 on January 12, 1943, after suffering a heart attack at the wheel of his car en route to work.
