= Fritz Mollwitz =

German baseball player (1890–1967)

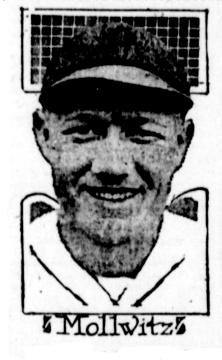
- First baseman
- Born: June 16, 1890; Coburg, Germany
- Died: October 3, 1967 (aged 77); Bradenton, Florida, U.S.
- Batted: Right Threw: Right

MLB debut
- September 26, 1913, for the Chicago Cubs

Last MLB appearance
- September 28, 1919, for the St. Louis Cardinals

MLB statistics
- Batting average: .241
- Home runs: 1
- Runs batted in: 158
- Stats at Baseball Reference

Teams
- Chicago Cubs (1913–1914); Cincinnati Reds (1914–1916); Chicago Cubs (1916); Pittsburgh Pirates (1917–1919); St. Louis Cardinals (1919)

Frederick August "Fritz" Mollwitz (June 16, 1890 – October 3, 1967) was a German–American first baseman who played in Major League Baseball.

Mollwitz was drafted in 1913 by the Chicago Cubs from the minor leagues, where he had been playing in the Wisconsin-Illinois League with the Green Bay Bays. He would play with the Cubs beginning that season and into the next season until he was traded to the Cincinnati Reds for Claud Derrick. In 1916, he would return to Chicago when the Cubs purchased him from the Reds. The following year, Mollwitz returned to the minor leagues when he was purchased by the Kansas City Blues of the American Association from the Cubs. Later that year, he was traded to the Pittsburgh Pirates along with a player to be named later for players to be named later. Eventually, Roy Sanders was sent to Pittsburgh and Alex McCarthy, Ray Miller and Ike McAuley were sent to Kansas City to complete the trade. In 1919, the St. Louis Cardinals purchased Mollwitz from the Pirates.

Mollwitz died on October 3, 1967. He is buried in Brookfield, Wisconsin.
