= 1917 Philadelphia Phillies season =

Major League Baseball season

1917 Philadelphia Phillies
- League: National League
- Ballpark: Baker Bowl
- City: Philadelphia, Pennsylvania
- Owners: William F. Baker
- Managers: Pat Moran

The following lists the events of the 1917 Philadelphia Phillies season.

== Regular season ==
=== Season standings ===
National League
Team	W	L	Pct.	GB	Home	Road
New York Giants	98	56	.636	—	50‍–‍28	48‍–‍28
Philadelphia Phillies	87	65	.572	10	46‍–‍29	41‍–‍36
St. Louis Cardinals	82	70	.539	15	38‍–‍38	44‍–‍32
Cincinnati Reds	78	76	.506	20	39‍–‍38	39‍–‍38
Chicago Cubs	74	80	.481	24	35‍–‍42	39‍–‍38
Boston Braves	72	81	.471	25½	35‍–‍42	37‍–‍39
Brooklyn Robins	70	81	.464	26½	36‍–‍38	34‍–‍43
Pittsburgh Pirates	51	103	.331	47	25‍–‍53	26‍–‍50

=== Record vs. opponents ===
1917 National League record Sources:
Team	BSN	BRO	CHC	CIN	NYG	PHI	PIT	STL
Boston	—	13–9–1	11–11	10–12–2	7–15	11–11	14–8	6–15–1
Brooklyn	9–13–1	—	7–15	10–12	9–13–2	9–11–1	16–6–1	10–11
Chicago	11–11	15–7	—	8–14–1	7–15–1	6–16–1	17–5	10–12
Cincinnati	12–10–2	12–10	14–8–1	—	11–11	8–14	12–10	9–13
New York	15–7	13–9–2	15–7–1	11–11	—	14–8	16–6–1	14–8
Philadelphia	11–11	11–9–1	16–6–1	14–8	8–14	—	14–8	13–9
Pittsburgh	8–14	6–16–1	5–17	10–12	6–16–1	8–14	—	8–14–1
St. Louis	15–6–1	11–10	12–10	13–9	8–14	9–13	14–8–1	—

=== Roster ===
1917 Philadelphia Phillies
Roster
Pitchers: Pete Alexander; Chief Bender; Paul Fittery; Jimmy Lavender; Erskine Mayer; Joe Oeschger; Eppa Rixey	Catchers: Bert Adams; Ed Burns; Bill Killefer; Infielders: Dave Bancroft; Bobby Byrne; Oscar Dugey; Johnny Evers; Fred Luderus; Patsy McGaffigan; Bert Niehoff; Harry Pearce; Milt Stock	Outfielders: Claude Cooper; Gavvy Cravath; Dode Paskert; Wildfire Schulte; Possum Whitted	Manager: Pat Moran

== Player stats ==
=== Batting ===
==== Starters by position ====
Note: Pos = Position; G = Games played; AB = At bats; H = Hits; Avg. = Batting average; HR = Home runs; RBI = Runs batted in

Pos	Player	G	AB	H	Avg.	HR	RBI
C	Bill Killefer	125	409	112	.274	0	31
1B	Fred Luderus	154	522	136	.261	5	72
2B	Bert Niehoff	114	361	92	.255	2	42
SS	Dave Bancroft	127	478	116	.243	4	43
3B	Milt Stock	150	564	149	.264	3	53
OF	Dode Paskert	141	546	137	.251	4	43
OF	Gavvy Cravath	140	503	141	.280	12	83
OF	Possum Whitted	149	553	155	.280	3	70

==== Other batters ====
Note: G = Games played; AB = At bats; H = Hits; Avg. = Batting average; HR = Home runs; RBI = Runs batted in

Player	G	AB	H	Avg.	HR	RBI
Johnny Evers	56	183	41	.224	1	12
Frank Schulte	64	149	32	.215	1	15
Bert Adams	43	107	22	.206	1	7
Oscar Dugey	44	72	14	.194	0	9
Patsy McGaffigan	19	60	10	.167	0	6
Ed Burns	20	49	10	.204	0	6
Claude Cooper	24	29	3	.103	0	1
Harry Pearce	7	16	4	.250	0	2
Bobby Byrne	13	14	5	.357	0	0

=== Pitching ===
==== Starting pitchers ====
Note: G = Games pitched; IP = Innings pitched; W = Wins; L = Losses; ERA = Earned run average; SO = Strikeouts

Player	G	IP	W	L	ERA	SO
Pete Alexander	45	388.0	30	14	1.83	200
Eppa Rixey	39	281.1	16	21	2.27	121
Joe Oeschger	42	262.0	15	14	2.75	123
Erskine Mayer	28	160.0	11	6	2.76	64

==== Other pitchers ====
Note: G = Games pitched; IP = Innings pitched; W = Wins; L = Losses; ERA = Earned run average; SO = Strikeouts

Player	G	IP	W	L	ERA	SO
Jimmy Lavender	28	129.1	6	8	3.55	52
Chief Bender	20	113.0	8	2	1.67	43

==== Relief pitchers ====
Note: G = Games pitched; W = Wins; L = Losses; SV = Saves; ERA = Earned run average; SO = Strikeouts

Player	G	W	L	SV	ERA	SO
Paul Fittery	17	1	1	0	4.53	13
