= 1917 Cincinnati Reds season =

1917 Cincinnati Reds
- League: National League
- Ballpark: Redland Field
- City: Cincinnati
- Owners: Garry Herrmann
- Managers: Christy Mathewson

The 1917 Cincinnati Reds season was a season in American baseball. The team finished fourth in the National League with a record of 78–76, 20 games behind the New York Giants.

== Off-season ==
It was a very quiet off-season for the Reds heading into the 1917 season. Cincinnati purchased the contract of pitcher Roy Sanders from the Kansas City Blues of the American Association (20th century) for $7500. In 45 games with the Blues, Sanders was 18-16 with a 3.80 ERA, pitching 277 innings for the club.

== Regular season ==
On April 23, the Reds purchased the contract of legendary athlete Jim Thorpe from the New York Giants. Thorpe, known for winning two gold medals at the 1912 Summer Olympics, also played with the Canton Bulldogs football club in the Ohio League. He had minimal playing time with the Giants from 1913–1915 before spending the 1916 season in the minor leagues.

On May 2, in the "double no-hitter" between Fred Toney of the Reds and Hippo Vaughn of the Chicago Cubs, Thorpe drove in the winning run in the 10th inning. Late in the season, he was sold back to the Giants. It is still the only occasion in major league history in which a regulation nine innings was played without either team logging a hit.

The Reds picked up pitcher Dutch Ruether from the Chicago Cubs on July 17 off of waivers. In 10 games with Chicago, Ruether was 2-0 with a 2.48 ERA. Just over two weeks later, on August 1, the Reds make another waiver claim, picking up outfielder Sherry Magee from the Boston Braves. Magee, in his 14th season in the National League, had a .256 average with one home run and 21 RBI when he was picked up. Over his career, Magee led the NL in RBI three times (1907, 1910 and 1914). His best season was in 1910 with the Philadelphia Phillies, as Magee led the league with a .331 batting average, scored 110 runs and drove in 123 runners.

On August 18, the Reds returned Jim Thorpe to the New York Giants. In 77 games, Thorpe batted .247 with four home runs and 36 RBI.

=== Season summary ===
Cincinnati had a tough start to the season, as after 44 games, the team sat in seventh place with a poor 18-26 record. The team turned their season around, putting together a run of 36-17 over their next 53 games to improve their overall record to 54-43 and moved into second place in the National League, however, the team was 7.5 games behind the first place New York Giants. Over the next few weeks, Cincinnati struggled and fell completely out of the pennant race. The club finished the year with a 78-76 record and in fourth place. The 78 wins was the Reds highest total since winning 79 games in 1905. This also was the first time since 1909 that the team finished with a winning record. Cincinnati's attendance also rose to 269,056, their highest total since 1912.

Outfielder Edd Roush led the National League with a .341 batting average, and added four home runs and 67 RBI in 136 games in his first full season with the Reds. Third baseman Heinie Groh hit .304 with one home run and 53 RBI in 156 games. First baseman Hal Chase tied for the team lead with four home runs, and led the club with 86 RBI while batting .277. Outfielder Greasy Neale led Cincinnati with 25 stolen bases, and had a .294 batting average with three home runs and 33 RBI.

The pitching staff was led by Fred Toney, who put together a 24-16 record and a 2.20 ERA in 43 games. Toney led the Reds in innings pitched at 339.2 and had 31 complete games. Pete Schneider joined Toney in the 20 win club, as he went 20-19 with a 2.10 ERA in 46 games. Schneider pitched 333.2 innings, had 24 complete games and led the Reds by striking out 138 batters. Hod Eller spent most of his time pitching in relief, as he put together a 10-5 record with a 2.36 ERA in 37 games, 26 in relief.

=== Season standings ===
National League
Team	W	L	Pct.	GB	Home	Road
New York Giants	98	56	.636	—	50‍–‍28	48‍–‍28
Philadelphia Phillies	87	65	.572	10	46‍–‍29	41‍–‍36
St. Louis Cardinals	82	70	.539	15	38‍–‍38	44‍–‍32
Cincinnati Reds	78	76	.506	20	39‍–‍38	39‍–‍38
Chicago Cubs	74	80	.481	24	35‍–‍42	39‍–‍38
Boston Braves	72	81	.471	25½	35‍–‍42	37‍–‍39
Brooklyn Robins	70	81	.464	26½	36‍–‍38	34‍–‍43
Pittsburgh Pirates	51	103	.331	47	25‍–‍53	26‍–‍50

=== Record vs. opponents ===
1917 National League record Sources:
Team	BSN	BRO	CHC	CIN	NYG	PHI	PIT	STL
Boston	—	13–9–1	11–11	10–12–2	7–15	11–11	14–8	6–15–1
Brooklyn	9–13–1	—	7–15	10–12	9–13–2	9–11–1	16–6–1	10–11
Chicago	11–11	15–7	—	8–14–1	7–15–1	6–16–1	17–5	10–12
Cincinnati	12–10–2	12–10	14–8–1	—	11–11	8–14	12–10	9–13
New York	15–7	13–9–2	15–7–1	11–11	—	14–8	16–6–1	14–8
Philadelphia	11–11	11–9–1	16–6–1	14–8	8–14	—	14–8	13–9
Pittsburgh	8–14	6–16–1	5–17	10–12	6–16–1	8–14	—	8–14–1
St. Louis	15–6–1	11–10	12–10	13–9	8–14	9–13	14–8–1	—

=== Notable transactions ===
- April 23, 1917: Jim Thorpe was purchased by the Reds from the New York Giants.
- August 18, 1917: Jim Thorpe was returned by the Reds to the New York Giants.
- September 20, 1917: Snipe Conley was drafted by the Reds from the Dallas Giants in the 1917 rule 5 draft.

=== Roster ===
1917 Cincinnati Reds
Roster
Pitchers: Rube Bressler; Hod Eller; Joe Engel; Elmer Knetzer; Clarence Mitchell; Scott Perry; Herman Pillette; Mike Regan; Jimmy Ring; Dutch Ruether; Roy Sanders; Pete Schneider; Fred Toney	Catchers: Tommy Clarke; Emil Huhn; Harry Smith; Ivey Wingo; Infielders: Hal Chase; Gus Getz; Heinie Groh; Larry Kopf; Bill McKechnie; Dave Shean	Outfielders: Manuel Cueto; Tommy Griffith; Sherry Magee; Greasy Neale; Edd Roush; Jim Thorpe	Manager: Christy Mathewson

== Player stats ==
=== Batting ===
==== Starters by position ====
Note: Pos = Position; G = Games played; AB = At bats; H = Hits; Avg. = Batting average; HR = Home runs; RBI = Runs batted in

Pos	Player	G	AB	H	Avg.	HR	RBI
C	Ivey Wingo	121	399	106	.266	2	39
1B	Hal Chase	152	602	167	.277	4	86
2B	Dave Shean	131	442	93	.210	2	35
3B	Heinie Groh	156	599	182	.304	1	53
SS	Larry Kopf	148	573	146	.255	2	26
OF	Edd Roush	136	522	178	.341	4	67
OF	Greasy Neale	121	385	113	.294	3	33
OF	Tommy Griffith	115	363	98	.270	1	45

==== Other batters ====
Note: G = Games played; AB = At bats; H = Hits; Avg. = Batting average; HR = Home runs; RBI = Runs batted in

Player	G	AB	H	Avg.	HR	RBI
Jim Thorpe	77	251	62	.247	4	36
Manuel Cueto	56	140	28	.200	1	11
Sherry Magee	45	137	44	.321	0	23
Bill McKechnie	48	134	34	.254	0	15
Tommy Clarke	58	110	32	.291	1	13
Emil Huhn	23	51	10	.196	0	3
Harry Smith	8	17	2	.118	0	1
Gus Getz	7	14	4	.286	0	3

=== Pitching ===
==== Starting pitchers ====
Note: G = Games pitched; IP = Innings pitched; W = Wins; L = Losses; ERA = Earned run average; SO = Strikeouts

Player	G	IP	W	L	ERA	SO
Fred Toney	43	339.2	24	16	2.20	123
Pete Schneider	46	333.2	20	19	2.10	138
Mike Regan	32	216.0	11	10	2.71	50
Roy Sanders	2	14.0	0	1	4.50	3
Joe Engel	1	8.0	0	1	5.63	2

==== Other pitchers ====
Note: G = Games pitched; IP = Innings pitched; W = Wins; L = Losses; ERA = Earned run average; SO = Strikeouts

Player	G	IP	W	L	ERA	SO
Clarence Mitchell	32	159.1	9	15	3.22	37
Hod Eller	37	152.1	10	5	2.36	77
Jimmy Ring	24	88.0	3	7	4.40	33
Dutch Ruether	7	35.2	1	2	3.53	12
Scott Perry	4	13.1	0	0	6.75	4
Rube Bressler	2	9.0	0	0	6.00	2

==== Relief pitchers ====
Note: G = Games pitched; W = Wins; L = Losses; SV = Saves; ERA = Earned run average; SO = Strikeouts

Player	G	W	L	SV	ERA	SO
Elmer Knetzer	11	0	0	1	2.96	7
Herman Pillette	1	0	0	0	18.00	0
