= Bruce Hitt =

American baseball player (1897–1973)

- Pitcher
- Born: March 14, 1897; Comanche, Texas
- Died: November 10, 1973 (aged 76); Portland, Oregon
- Batted: Right Threw: Right

MLB debut
- September 23, 1917, for the St. Louis Cardinals

Last MLB appearance
- September 30, 1917, for the St. Louis Cardinals

MLB statistics
- Games played: 2
- Innings pitched: 4
- Earned run average: 9.00
- Stats at Baseball Reference

Teams
- St. Louis Cardinals (1917)

Bruce Smith Hitt (March 14, 1897 – November 10, 1973) was a pitcher in Major League Baseball. He played for the St. Louis Cardinals in 1917.
