= Oscar Horstmann =

American baseball player (1891–1977)

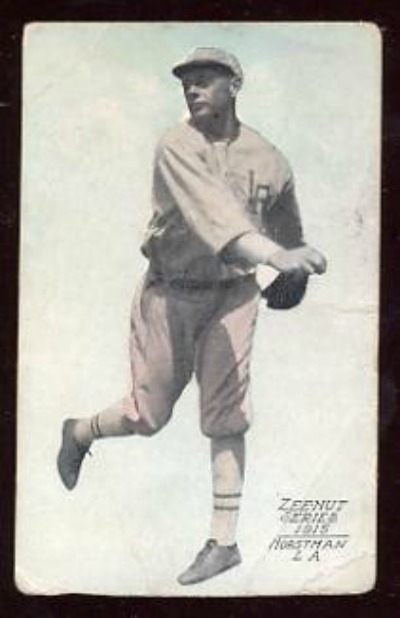
- Pitcher
- Born: June 2, 1891; Alma, Missouri
- Died: May 11, 1977 (aged 85); Salina, Kansas
- Batted: Right Threw: Right

MLB debut
- April 18, 1917, for the St. Louis Cardinals

Last MLB appearance
- June 1, 1919, for the St. Louis Cardinals

MLB statistics
- Win–loss record: 9–7
- Earned run average: 3.67
- Strikeout(s): 61
- Stats at Baseball Reference

Teams
- St. Louis Cardinals (1917–1919)

Oscar Theodore Horstmann (June 2, 1891 – May 11, 1977) was a Major League Baseball pitcher who played with the St. Louis Cardinals from 1917 to 1919.
