= Mike Regan (baseball) =

American baseball player (1887–1961)

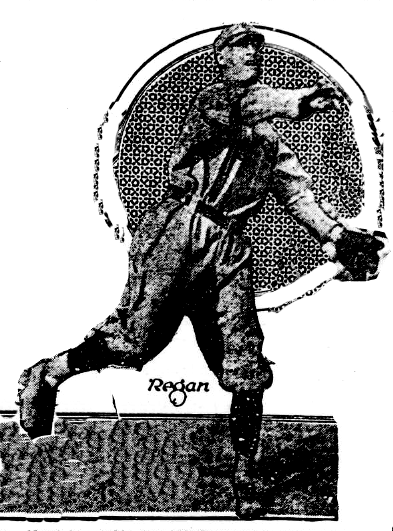
- Pitcher
- Born: November 19, 1887; Phoenix, New York, U.S.
- Died: May 22, 1961 (aged 73); Albany, New York, U.S.
- Batted: Right Threw: Right

MLB debut
- May 13, 1917, for the Cincinnati Reds

Last MLB appearance
- May 6, 1919, for the Cincinnati Reds

MLB statistics
- Win–loss record: 16–15
- Earned run average: 2.84
- Strikeouts: 66
- Stats at Baseball Reference

Teams
- Cincinnati Reds (1917–1919)

Michael John Regan (November 19, 1887 – May 22, 1961) was an American Major League Baseball pitcher who played for the Cincinnati Reds from 1917 to 1919.
