= Fred Blackwell =

American baseball player (1891–1975)

- Catcher
- Born: September 7, 1891; Bowling Green, Kentucky, U.S.
- Died: December 8, 1975 (aged 84); Morgantown, Kentucky, U.S.
- Batted: Left Threw: Right

MLB debut
- September 25, 1917, for the Pittsburgh Pirates

Last MLB appearance
- September 28, 1919, for the Pittsburgh Pirates

MLB statistics
- Batting average: .205
- Home runs: 0
- Runs batted in: 10
- Stats at Baseball Reference

Teams
- Pittsburgh Pirates (1917–1919)

Frederick William Blackwell (September 7, 1891 – December 8, 1975) was an American Major League Baseball catcher who played for the Pittsburgh Pirates from 1917 to 1919.
