= Red Smith (catcher) =

American baseball player (1892–1970)

- Catcher
- Born: April 11, 1892; Logansport, Indiana, U.S.
- Died: August 23, 1970 (aged 78); Bradenton, Florida, U.S.
- Batted: Right Threw: Right

MLB debut
- September 17, 1917, for the Pittsburgh Pirates

Last MLB appearance
- September 1, 1918, for the Pittsburgh Pirates

MLB statistics
- Batting average: .156
- Runs scored: 2
- Runs batted in: 5
- Games played: 26
- Stats at Baseball Reference

Teams
- Pittsburgh Pirates (1917–1918)

Willard "Red" Jehu Smith (April 11, 1892 – July 17, 1970) was an American catcher in Major League Baseball who played over parts of two seasons with the Pittsburgh Pirates. For his career, he compiled a .156 batting average (7-for-45) in 26 game appearances.

Smith was born in Logansport, Indiana and died in Bradenton, Florida, at the age of 78.
