= Al Baird =

American baseball player (1895-1976)

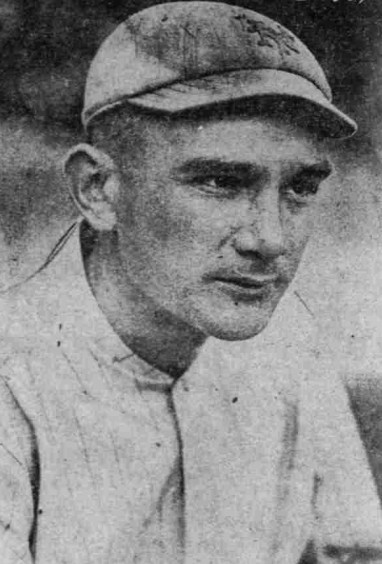
- Second baseman/Third baseman/Shortstop
- Born: June 2, 1895; Cleburne, Texas
- Died: November 27, 1976 (aged 81); Shreveport, Louisiana
- Batted: Right Threw: Right

MLB debut
- September 10, 1917, for the New York Giants

Last MLB appearance
- September 28, 1919, for the New York Giants

MLB statistics
- Batting average: .252
- Runs scored: 9
- Putouts: 62
- Stats at Baseball Reference

Teams
- New York Giants (1917, 1919)

Albert Wells Baird (June 2, 1895 – November 27, 1976) was a Major League Baseball infielder who played parts of the 1917 and 1919 seasons for the New York Giants. Between his playing days he served in the military during World War I. Baird was born in Cleburne, Texas and died in Shreveport, Louisiana. He batted and threw right-handed. He went to college at Centenary College of Louisiana and Louisiana State University.
