= Ed Fitzpatrick =

American baseball player (1889-1965)

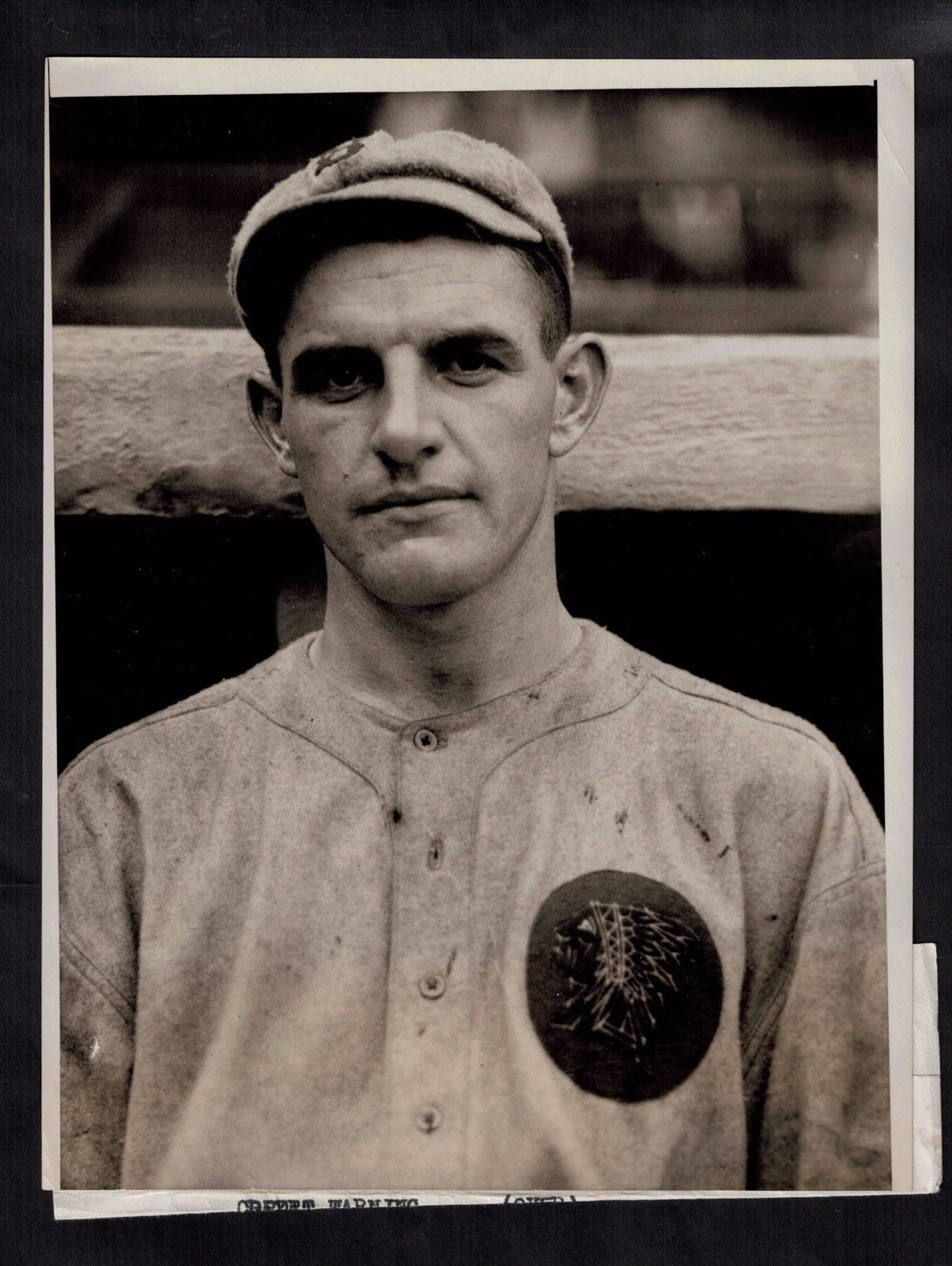
- Second baseman / Outfielder
- Born: December 9, 1889; Lewistown, Pennsylvania, U.S.
- Died: October 23, 1965 (aged 75); Bethlehem, Pennsylvania, U.S.
- Batted: Right Threw: Right

MLB debut
- April 17, 1915, for the Boston Braves

Last MLB appearance
- October 4, 1917, for the Boston Braves

MLB statistics
- Batting average: .227
- Home runs: 1
- Runs batted in: 59
- Stats at Baseball Reference

Teams
- Boston Braves (1915–17)

Edward Henry Fitzpartrick (December 9, 1889 – October 23, 1965) was an American Major League Baseball player. He played three seasons for the Boston Braves from 1915 until 1917, mostly at second base or right field.

== Sources ==
- Career statistics from Baseball Reference · Baseball Reference (Minors) · Retrosheet · Baseball Almanac
