= Tony DeFate =

American baseball player (1895–1963)

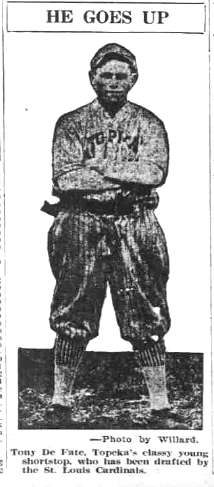
- DeFate before his call-up to the Major Leagues.
- Infielder
- Born: February 22, 1895; Kansas City, Missouri, U.S.
- Died: September 3, 1963 (aged 68); New Orleans, Louisiana, U.S.
- Batted: Right Threw: Right

MLB debut
- April 18, 1917, for the St. Louis Cardinals

Last MLB appearance
- July 9, 1917, for the Detroit Tigers

MLB statistics
- Batting average: .125
- Home runs: 0
- RBIs: 1
- Stats at Baseball Reference

Teams
- St. Louis Cardinals (1917); Detroit Tigers (1917)

Clyde Herbert "Tony" DeFate (February 22, 1895 – September 3, 1963) was an American professional baseball player who played one season in Major League Baseball as an infielder for two teams. In 1917, he played for the St. Louis Cardinals of the National League and appeared in 14 games, and later for the Detroit Tigers of the American League and appeared in three games. In his 17-game major league career, he collected two hits in 16 at bats for a .125 batting average. As a fielder, playing both as a third baseman and second baseman, he had six assists while not committing an error. In addition to his major league career, he played a total of 15 seasons in minor league baseball for various organizations at differing levels. Defate died at the age of 68 in New Orleans, Louisiana, and is interred at Lafayette Memorial Park in Lafayette, Louisiana.

== Gallery ==
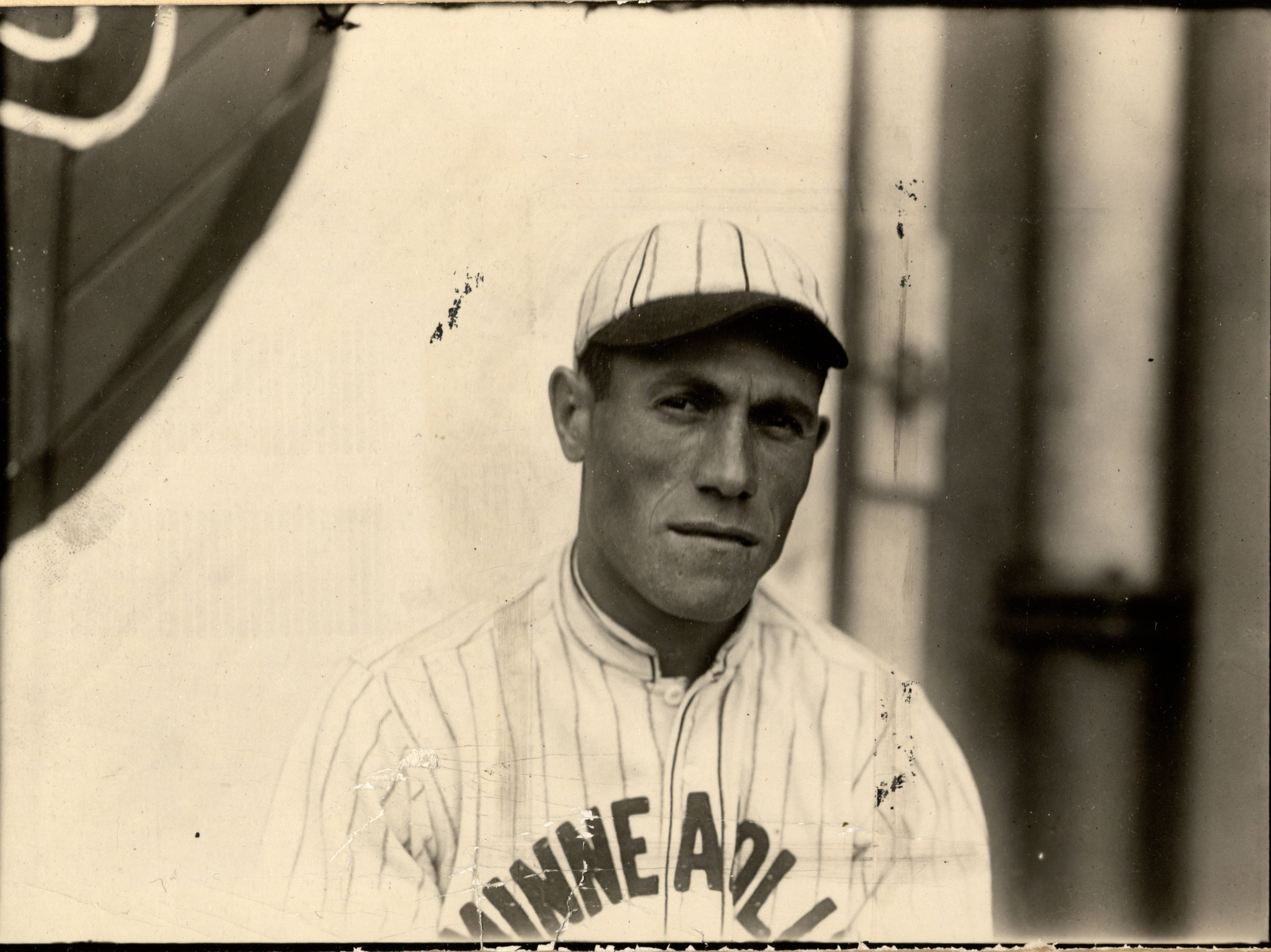
DeFate with the Minneapolis Millers in 1922

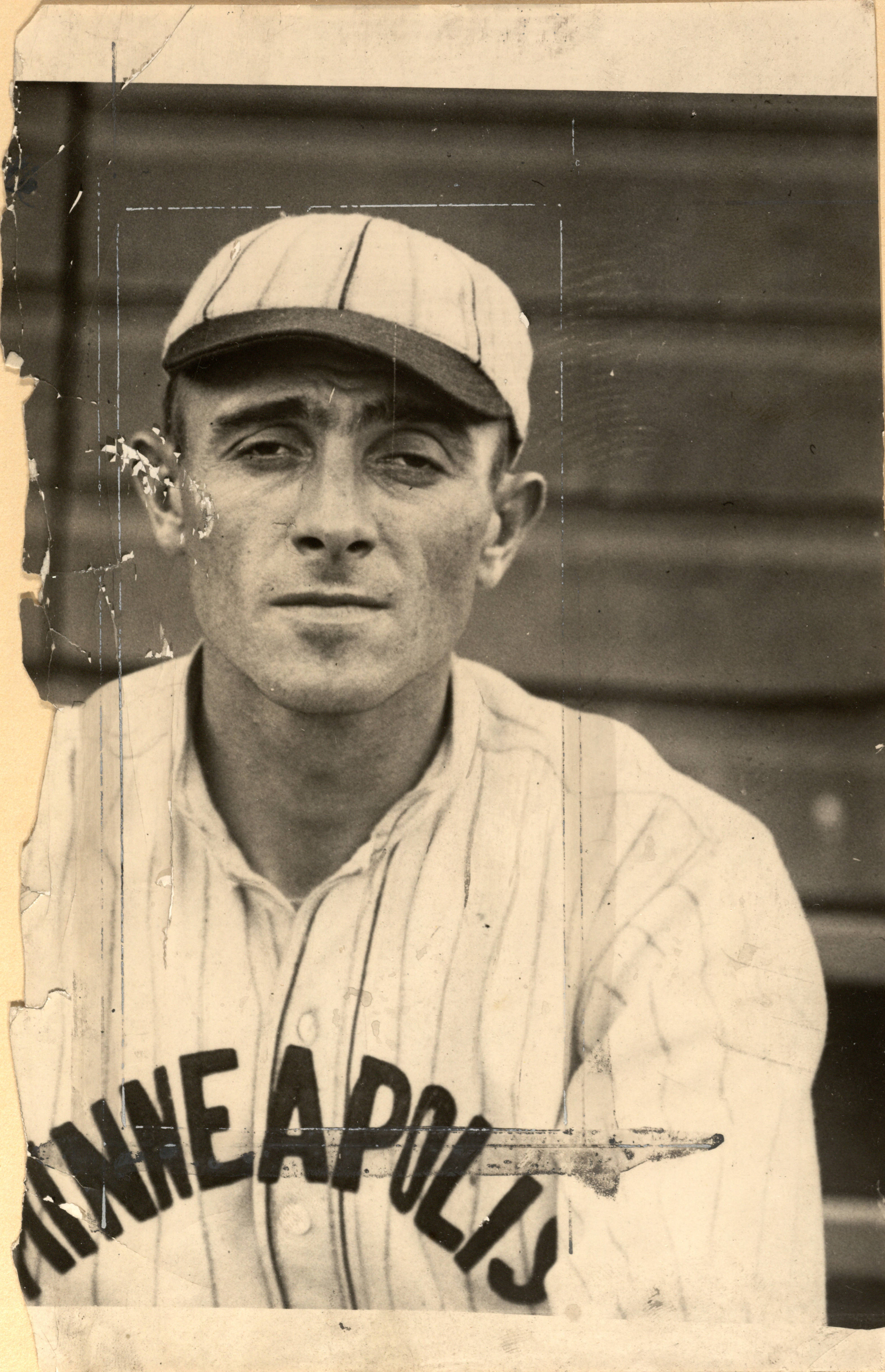
DeFate with the Minneapolis Millers in 1922
