= Harry Pearce (baseball) =

American baseball player (1889-1942)

- Second baseman
- Born: July 12, 1889; Philadelphia, Pennsylvania, U.S.
- Died: January 8, 1942 (aged 52); Philadelphia, Pennsylvania, U.S.
- Batted: Right Threw: Right

MLB debut
- October 2, 1917, for the Philadelphia Phillies

Last MLB appearance
- September 11, 1919, for the Philadelphia Phillies

MLB statistics
- Batting average: .208
- Hits: 88
- Runs batted in: 29
- Stats at Baseball Reference

Teams
- Philadelphia Phillies (1917–1919)

Harry James Pearce (July 12, 1889 – January 8, 1942) was an American Major League Baseball second baseman who played for the Philadelphia Phillies from 1917 to 1919.
