= Ad Swigler =

American baseball player (1895–1975)

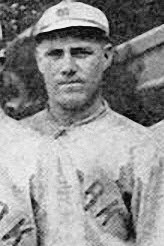
- Pitcher
- Born: September 21, 1895; Philadelphia, Pennsylvania, U.S.
- Died: February 5, 1975 (aged 79); Philadelphia, Pennsylvania, U.S.
- Batted: Right Threw: Right

MLB debut
- September 25, 1917, for the New York Giants

Last MLB appearance
- September 25, 1917, for the New York Giants

MLB statistics
- Games played: 1
- Earned run average: 6.00
- Strikeouts: 4
- Stats at Baseball Reference

Teams
- New York Giants (1917)

Adam William "Ad" Swigler (September 21, 1895 – February 5, 1975), nicknamed "Doc", was an American professional baseball pitcher. Swigler played for the New York Giants in the 1917 season.

In 1 career game, he had a 0-1 record, with a 6.00 ERA. He batted and threw right-handed.Due to an arm injury, he did not return to professional baseball, but did continue to play semi-professional ball.

He was an alumnus of the University of Pennsylvania School of Dental Medicine.

Swigler was born and died in Philadelphia.

== University of Pennsylvania ==
Swigler received a baseball scholarship to attend the University of Pennsylvania. While there, he lettered in baseball, track, football, and basketball.

After his professional baseball season, Swigler served as the Freshman baseball coach at Penn.
