= Howdy Caton =

American baseball player (1894–1948)

- Shortstop
- Born: July 16, 1894; Zanesville, Ohio, U.S.
- Died: January 8, 1948 (aged 53); Zanesville, Ohio, U.S.
- Batted: Right Threw: Right

MLB debut
- September 17, 1917, for the Pittsburgh Pirates

Last MLB appearance
- September 6, 1920, for the Pittsburgh Pirates

MLB statistics
- Batting average: .226
- Home runs: 0
- Runs batted in: 53
- Stats at Baseball Reference

Teams
- Pittsburgh Pirates (1917–1920)

James Howard "Howdy" Caton (July 16, 1894 – January 8, 1948) was an American professional baseball player. He was a shortstop over parts of four seasons (1917–20) with the Pittsburgh Pirates. For his career, he compiled a .226 batting average in 814 at-bats, with 53 runs batted in.

He was born and later died in Zanesville, Ohio at the age of 53.
