= Mike Massey (baseball) =

American baseball player (1893-1971)

- Second baseman
- Born: September 28, 1893; Galveston, Texas, U.S.
- Died: October 17, 1971 (aged 78); Shreveport, Louisiana, U.S.
- Batted: Switch Threw: Right

MLB debut
- April 12, 1917, for the Boston Braves

Last MLB appearance
- June 30, 1917, for the Boston Braves

MLB statistics
- Batting average: .198
- Home runs: 0
- Runs batted in: 2
- Stats at Baseball Reference

Teams
- Boston Braves (1917)

William Herbert "Mike" Massey (September 28, 1893 – October 10, 1971) was an American Major League Baseball second baseman. He played the first half of the 1917 season for the Boston Braves. He played ten seasons in the minor leagues, from 1915 until 1924.

== Sources ==
- Career statistics from Baseball Reference · Baseball Reference (Minors) · Retrosheet · Baseball Almanac
