= 1917 Brooklyn Robins season =

1917 Brooklyn Robins
- League: National League
- Ballpark: Ebbets Field
- City: Brooklyn, New York
- Record: 70–81 (.464)
- League place: 7th
- Owners: Charles Ebbets, Ed McKeever, Stephen McKeever
- President: Charles Ebbets
- Managers: Wilbert Robinson

With World War I looming over the season, the 1917 Brooklyn Robins fell into seventh place.

== Regular season ==
=== Season standings ===
National League
Team	W	L	Pct.	GB	Home	Road
New York Giants	98	56	.636	—	50‍–‍28	48‍–‍28
Philadelphia Phillies	87	65	.572	10	46‍–‍29	41‍–‍36
St. Louis Cardinals	82	70	.539	15	38‍–‍38	44‍–‍32
Cincinnati Reds	78	76	.506	20	39‍–‍38	39‍–‍38
Chicago Cubs	74	80	.481	24	35‍–‍42	39‍–‍38
Boston Braves	72	81	.471	25½	35‍–‍42	37‍–‍39
Brooklyn Robins	70	81	.464	26½	36‍–‍38	34‍–‍43
Pittsburgh Pirates	51	103	.331	47	25‍–‍53	26‍–‍50

=== Record vs. opponents ===
1917 National League record Sources:
Team	BSN	BRO	CHC	CIN	NYG	PHI	PIT	STL
Boston	—	13–9–1	11–11	10–12–2	7–15	11–11	14–8	6–15–1
Brooklyn	9–13–1	—	7–15	10–12	9–13–2	9–11–1	16–6–1	10–11
Chicago	11–11	15–7	—	8–14–1	7–15–1	6–16–1	17–5	10–12
Cincinnati	12–10–2	12–10	14–8–1	—	11–11	8–14	12–10	9–13
New York	15–7	13–9–2	15–7–1	11–11	—	14–8	16–6–1	14–8
Philadelphia	11–11	11–9–1	16–6–1	14–8	8–14	—	14–8	13–9
Pittsburgh	8–14	6–16–1	5–17	10–12	6–16–1	8–14	—	8–14–1
St. Louis	15–6–1	11–10	12–10	13–9	8–14	9–13	14–8–1	—

=== Notable transactions ===
- August 16, 1917: Fred Merkle was purchased from the Robins by the Chicago Cubs.

=== Roster ===
1917 Brooklyn Robins
Roster
Pitchers: Leon Cadore; Larry Cheney; Jack Coombs; Wheezer Dell; Rich Durning; Rube Marquard; Johnny Miljus; Jeff Pfeffer; John Russell; Sherry Smith; Paul Wachtel	Catchers: Ernie Krueger; Chief Meyers; Otto Miller; Jack Snyder; Mack Wheat; Infielders: George Cutshaw; Jake Daubert; Bunny Fabrique; Bill Leard; Fred Merkle; Mike Mowrey; Frank O'Rourke; Ivy Olson; Red Smyth	Outfielders: Jim Hickman; Jimmy Johnston; Lew Malone; Hy Myers; Casey Stengel; Zack Wheat	Manager: Wilbert Robinson

== Player stats ==
=== Batting ===
==== Starters by position ====
Note: Pos = Position; G = Games played; AB = At bats; H = Hits; Avg. = Batting average; HR = Home runs; RBI = Runs batted in

Pos	Player	G	AB	H	Avg.	HR	RBI
C	Otto Miller	92	274	63	.230	1	17
1B	Jake Daubert	125	468	122	.261	2	30
2B	George Cutshaw	135	487	126	.259	4	49
3B	Mike Mowrey	83	271	58	.214	0	25
SS	Ivy Olson	139	580	156	.269	2	38
OF	Casey Stengel	150	549	141	.257	6	73
OF	Zack Wheat	109	362	113	.312	1	41
OF	Jim Hickman	114	370	81	.219	6	36

==== Other batters ====
Note: G = Games played; AB = At bats; H = Hits; Avg. = Batting average; HR = Home runs; RBI = Runs batted in

Player	G	AB	H	Avg.	HR	RBI
Hy Myers	120	471	126	.268	1	41
Jimmy Johnston	103	330	89	.270	0	25
Frank O'Rourke	64	198	47	.237	0	15
Chief Meyers	47	132	28	.212	0	3
Bunny Fabrique	25	88	18	.205	1	3
Ernie Krueger	31	81	22	.272	1	6
Mack Wheat	29	60	8	.133	0	0
Red Smyth	29	24	3	.125	0	1
Jack Snyder	7	11	3	.273	0	1
Fred Merkle	2	8	1	.125	0	0
Bill Leard	3	3	0	.000	0	0
Lew Malone	1	0	0	----	0	0

=== Pitching ===
==== Starting pitchers ====
Note: G = Games pitched; IP = Innings pitched; W = Wins; L = Losses; ERA = Earned run average; SO = Strikeouts

Player	G	IP	W	L	ERA	SO
Jeff Pfeffer	30	266.0	11	15	2.23	115
Leon Cadore	37	264.0	13	13	2.45	115
Rube Marquard	37	232.2	19	12	2.55	117
Larry Cheney	35	210.1	8	12	2.35	102

==== Other pitchers ====
Note: G = Games pitched; IP = Innings pitched; W = Wins; L = Losses; ERA = Earned run average; SO = Strikeouts

Player	G	IP	W	L	ERA	SO
Sherry Smith	38	211.1	12	12	3.32	58
Jack Coombs	31	141.0	7	11	3.96	34
Wheezer Dell	17	58.0	0	4	3.72	28
John Russell	5	16.0	0	1	4.50	1
Johnny Miljus	4	15.0	0	1	0.60	9

==== Relief pitchers ====
Note: G = Games pitched; W = Wins; L = Losses; SV = Saves; ERA = Earned run average; SO = Strikeouts

Player	G	W	L	SV	ERA	SO
Paul Wachtel	2	0	0	0	10.50	3
Rich Durning	1	0	0	0	0.00	0
