= Jack Roche (baseball) =

American baseball player (1890–1983)

- Catcher
- Born: November 22, 1890; Los Angeles, California, U.S.
- Died: March 30, 1983 (aged 93); Peoria, Arizona, U.S.
- Batted: Right Threw: Right

MLB debut
- May 24, 1914, for the St. Louis Cardinals

Last MLB appearance
- April 18, 1917, for the St. Louis Cardinals

MLB statistics
- Batting average: .286
- Home runs: 0
- Runs batted in: 9
- Stats at Baseball Reference

Teams
- St. Louis Cardinals (1914–1915, 1917)

John Joseph Roche (November 22, 1890 – March 30, 1983) was an American Major League Baseball catcher who played for the St. Louis Cardinals in 1914, 1915, and 1917.
