= Bill Evans (1910s pitcher) =

American baseball player (1893–1946)

- Pitcher
- Born: February 10, 1893; Reidsville, North Carolina
- Died: December 21, 1946 (aged 53); Burlington, North Carolina
- Batted: Right Threw: Right

MLB debut
- August 13, 1916, for the Pittsburgh Pirates

Last MLB appearance
- June 1, 1919, for the Pittsburgh Pirates

MLB statistics
- Win–loss record: 2-13
- Earned run average: 3.85
- Strikeouts: 41
- Stats at Baseball Reference

Teams
- Pittsburgh Pirates (1916–1917, 1919)

William James Evans (February 10, 1893 – December 21, 1946) was a pitcher in Major League Baseball who played for the Pittsburgh Pirates (1916–17, 1919). Listed at 6 ft 0 in (1.83 m), 175 lb, Evans batted and threw right-handed. He was born in Reidsville, North Carolina.

In a three-season career, Evans posted a 2–13 record with a 3.85 ERA in 28 appearances, including 11 starts, six complete games, 10 games finished, 41 strikeouts, 48 walks, and 126 1/3 innings pitched.

In 1918 Evans served in the military during World War I.

An alumnus of Elon University and North Carolina State University, Evans died in Burlington, North Carolina at age 53.

== Sources ==
- Career statistics from Baseball Reference · Retrosheet · Baseball Almanac
