= Billy Gleason =

American baseball player (1894–1957)

- Second baseman
- Born: September 6, 1894; Chicago, Illinois, U.S.
- Died: June 8, 1957 (aged 62); Holyoke, Massachusetts, U.S.
- Batted: Right Threw: Right

MLB debut
- September 25, 1916, for the Pittsburgh Pirates

Last MLB appearance
- June 8, 1921, for the St. Louis Browns

MLB statistics
- Batting average: .220
- Home runs: 0
- Runs batted in: 8
- Stats at Baseball Reference

Teams
- Pittsburgh Pirates (1916–1917); St. Louis Browns (1921)

William Patrick Gleason (September 6, 1894 – January 9, 1957) was an American Major League Baseball second baseman who played with the Pittsburgh Pirates in 1916 and 1917 and the St. Louis Browns in 1921.
