= Ray Miller (first baseman) =

American baseball player (1888–1927)

- First baseman
- Born: February 12, 1888; Pittsburgh, Pennsylvania, U.S.
- Died: April 7, 1927 (aged 39); Pittsburgh, Pennsylvania, U.S.
- Batted: Left Threw: Left

MLB debut
- April 14, 1917, for the Cleveland Indians

Last MLB appearance
- August 22, 1917, for the Pittsburgh Pirates

MLB statistics
- Batting average: .167
- Home runs: 0
- Runs batted in: 2
- Stats at Baseball Reference

Teams
- Cleveland Indians (1917); Pittsburgh Pirates (1917)

Raymond Peter Miller (February 12, 1888 – April 7, 1927) was an American Major League Baseball first baseman who played for one season. He played 19 games for the Cleveland Indians during the 1917 Cleveland Indians season and six games for the Pittsburgh Pirates during the 1917 Pittsburgh Pirates season.
