= Sam Covington =

American baseball player

- First baseman
- Born: November 18, 1894; Denison, Texas, U.S.
- Died: January 4, 1963 (aged 68); Denison, Texas, U.S.
- Batted: Left Threw: Right

MLB debut
- August 25, 1913, for the St. Louis Browns

Last MLB appearance
- April 27, 1918, for the Boston Braves

MLB statistics
- Batting average: .178
- Home runs: 1
- Runs batted in: 14
- Stats at Baseball Reference

Teams
- St. Louis Browns (1913); Boston Braves (1917–1918)

Clarence Calvert "Sam" Covington (November 18, 1894 – January 4, 1963) was an American professional baseball player. He was a first baseman in parts of three seasons (1913, 1917–18) with the St. Louis Browns and Boston Braves. For his career, he compiled a .178 batting average, with one home run and 14 runs batted in.

He was born and later died in Denison, Texas, at the age of 68. His brother Tex also played in the major leagues.
