= Jim Middleton (baseball) =

American baseball player (1889–1974)

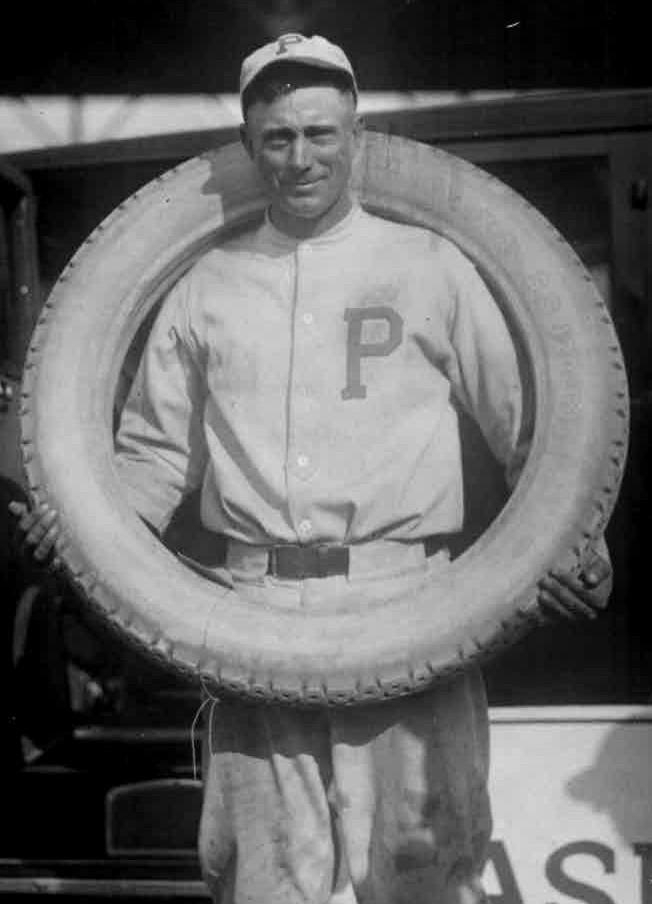
- Pitcher
- Born: May 28, 1889; Argos, Indiana, U.S.
- Died: January 12, 1974 (aged 84); Argos, Indiana, U.S.
- Batted: Right Threw: Right

MLB debut
- April 18, 1917, for the New York Giants

Last MLB appearance
- September 18, 1921, for the Detroit Tigers

MLB statistics
- Win–loss record: 7–12
- Earned run average: 4.51
- Strikeouts: 40
- Stats at Baseball Reference

Teams
- New York Giants (1917); Detroit Tigers (1921)

James Blaine "Rifle Jim" Middleton (May 28, 1889 – January 12, 1974) was an American professional baseball player. He was a right-handed pitcher over parts of two seasons (1917, 1921) with the New York Giants and Detroit Tigers. For his career, he compiled a 7–12 record in 51 appearances, with a 4.51 earned run average and 40 strikeouts.

He was born and later died in Argos, Indiana, at the age of 84.

== See also ==
- List of Major League Baseball annual saves leaders
