= Morrie Schick =

American baseball player (1892–1979)

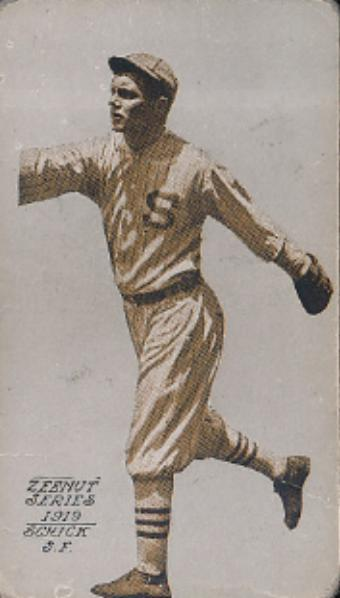
- Outfielder
- Born: April 17, 1892; Chicago, Illinois, U.S.
- Died: October 25, 1979 (aged 87); Hazel Crest, Illinois, U.S.
- Batted: Right Threw: Right

MLB debut
- April 15, 1917, for the Chicago Cubs

Last MLB appearance
- September 29, 1917, for the Chicago Cubs

MLB statistics
- Batting average: .147
- Home runs: 0
- Runs batted in: 3
- Stats at Baseball Reference

Teams
- Chicago Cubs (1917)

Maurice Francis Schick (April 17, 1892 – October 25, 1979) was an American professional baseball player who played outfield in the Major Leagues in 1917. He played for the Chicago Cubs. He played in the minors through 1925.
