= Harry Wolfe (baseball) =

American baseball player (1888–1971)

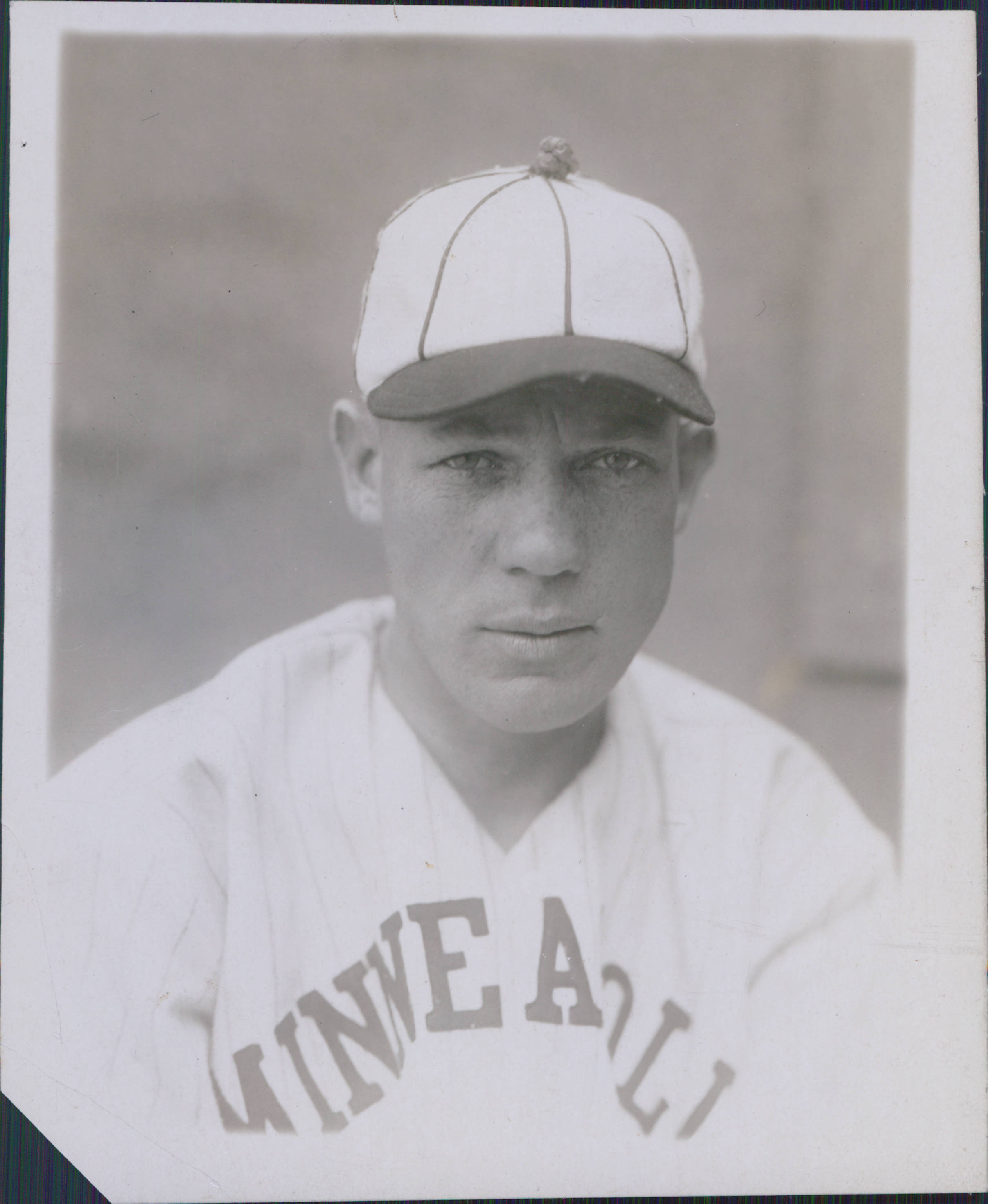
- Utility player
- Born: November 24, 1888; Worcester, Massachusetts, U.S.
- Died: July 28, 1971 (aged 82); Fort Wayne, Indiana, U.S.
- Batted: Right Threw: Right

MLB debut
- April 15, 1917, for the Chicago Cubs

Last MLB appearance
- July 16, 1917, for the Pittsburgh Pirates

MLB statistics
- Batting average: .200
- Home runs: 0
- Runs batted in: 1
- Stats at Baseball Reference

Teams
- Chicago Cubs (1917); Pittsburgh Pirates (1917)

Harold Wolfe (November 24, 1888 – July 28, 1971), nicknamed "Whitey", was an American professional baseball player. He appeared in 10* games in Major League Baseball in 1917, seven for the Chicago Cubs and three for the Pittsburgh Pirates. He played two games at shortstop, one in left field, and one at second base, with the remainder of his appearances coming as a pinch hitter or pinch runner.

Note: Wolfe may have played in 12 games total. Two appearances for the Cubs appear in Retrosheet.org's "Discrepancy File" for Wolfe.
