= Patsy McGaffigan =

American baseball player (1888–1940)

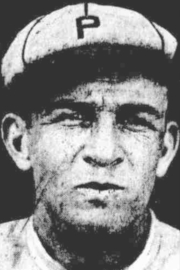
- Second baseman / Shortstop
- Born: September 12, 1888; Carlyle, Illinois, U.S.
- Died: December 22, 1940 (aged 52); Carlyle, Illinois, U.S.
- Batted: Right Threw: Right

MLB debut
- April 16, 1917, for the Philadelphia Phillies

Last MLB appearance
- June 22, 1918, for the Philadelphia Phillies

MLB statistics
- Batting average: .194
- Hits: 49
- Triples: 2
- Stats at Baseball Reference

Teams
- Philadelphia Phillies (1917–1918)

Mark Andrew "Patsy" McGaffigan (September 12, 1888 – December 22, 1940) was an American Major League Baseball second baseman and shortstop who played for two seasons. He played for the Philadelphia Phillies in 73 total games in 1917 and 1918.
