= Rich Durning =

American baseball player (1892–1948)

- Pitcher
- Born: October 10, 1892; Louisville, Kentucky, U.S.
- Died: September 23, 1948 (aged 55); Castle Point, New York, U.S.
- Batted: Left Threw: Left

MLB debut
- April 16, 1917, for the Brooklyn Robins

Last MLB appearance
- May 7, 1918, for the Brooklyn Robins

MLB statistics
- Win–loss record: 0–0
- Earned run average: 9.00
- Strikeouts: 0
- Stats at Baseball Reference

Teams
- Brooklyn Robins (1917–1918)

Richard Knott Durning (October 10, 1892 – September 23, 1948) was an American pitcher in Major League Baseball. He pitched in one game for the Brooklyn Robins in each of the 1917 and 1918 baseball seasons.
