= Barney Longest =

American baseball player (1917–1984)

- Infielder
- Born: July 15, 1917; Chicago, Illinois, U.S.
- Died: July 1984 (aged 66–67); Detroit, Michigan, U.S.
- Batted: Left Threw: Right

Negro league baseball debut
- 1946, for the Chicago American Giants

Last appearance
- 1955, for the Burlington A's
- Stats at Baseball Reference

Teams
- Chicago American Giants (1946–1947); Burlington A's (1955)

Bernell "Barney" Longest (July 15, 1917 – July, 1984) was an American professional baseball infielder in the Negro leagues. He played professionally from 1946 to 1955. He played for the Chicago American Giants in 1946 and 1947, and played in the Provincial League in 1955 with the Burlington A's.
