= Roy Sanders (National League pitcher) =

American baseball player (1892–1950)

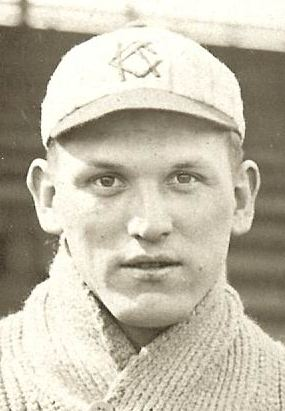
- Pitcher
- Born: August 1, 1892; Stafford, Kansas, U.S.
- Died: January 17, 1950 (aged 57); Kansas City, Missouri, U.S.
- Batted: Right Threw: Right

MLB debut
- April 16, 1917, for the Cincinnati Reds

Last MLB appearance
- August 27, 1918, for the Pittsburgh Pirates

MLB statistics
- Win–loss record: 7–10
- Earned run average: 2.75
- Strikeouts: 58
- Stats at Baseball Reference

Teams
- Cincinnati Reds (1917); Pittsburgh Pirates (1918)

Roy Garvin Sanders, nicknamed "Butch", (August 1, 1892 – January 17, 1950) was an American Major League Baseball pitcher. In 1917, Sanders was purchased from the Kansas City Blues of the American Association by the Cincinnati Reds and would play with the team that season. Later that year, Sanders returned to Kansas City when the Blues purchased him from the Reds. Not long after, Sanders was traded to the Pittsburgh Pirates to complete a deal that included Fritz Mollwitz.

He played at the collegiate level at William Jewell College.
