= Cooney Snyder =

American baseball player (1872–1917)

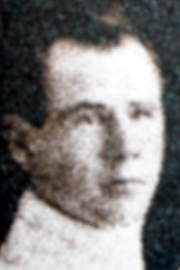
- Catcher
- Born: 1872; Toronto, Ontario, Canada
- Died: April 21, 1917 (aged 44–45); Toronto, Ontario, Canada
- Batted: Right Threw: Unknown

MLB debut
- May 19, 1898, for the Louisville Colonels

Last MLB appearance
- June 19, 1898, for the Louisville Colonels

MLB statistics
- Games played: 17
- At bats: 61
- Hits: 10
- Stats at Baseball Reference

Teams
- Louisville Colonels (1898)

Frank C. Snyder (1872 – April 21, 1917) was a Canadian Major League Baseball catcher. He played for the 1898 Louisville Colonels.

== Sources ==
- Career statistics from Baseball Reference · Baseball Reference (Minors) · Retrosheet · Baseball Almanac
