= Bob Steele (baseball) =

Canadian baseball player (1894–1962)

- Pitcher
- Born: March 29, 1894; Cassburn, Ontario, Canada
- Died: January 27, 1962 (aged 67); Ocala, Florida, United States
- Batted: Both Threw: Left

MLB debut
- April 17, 1916, for the St. Louis Cardinals

Last MLB appearance
- April 24, 1919, for the New York Giants

MLB statistics
- Win–loss record: 16-38
- Earned run average: 3.05
- Strikeouts: 217
- Stats at Baseball Reference

Teams
- St. Louis Cardinals (1916–1917); Pittsburgh Pirates (1917–1918); New York Giants (1918–1919)

Robert Wesley Steele (March 29, 1894 – January 27, 1962) was a Major League Baseball pitcher who played in four seasons. He played for the St. Louis Cardinals in 1916–1917, the Pittsburgh Pirates in 1917–1918 and the New York Giants in 1918–1919.

He is buried in Burlington, Wisconsin.
