= 1917 Major League Baseball season =

1917 MLB season
- League: American League (AL); National League (NL)
- Sport: Baseball
- Duration: Regular season: April 11 – October 4, 1917; World Series: October 7–15, 1917
- Games: 154
- Teams: 16 (8 per league)

Pennant winners
- AL champions: Chicago White Sox
- AL runners-up: Boston Red Sox
- NL champions: New York Giants
- NL runners-up: Philadelphia Phillies

World Series
- Champions: Chicago White Sox
- Runners-up: New York Giants

MLB seasons
- ← 1916 1918 →

Locations of teams for the 1915–1922 American League seasons
American League
Locations of teams for the 1916–1919 National League seasons
National League

The 1917 major league baseball season began on April 11, 1917. The regular season ended on October 4, with the New York Giants and Chicago White Sox as the regular season champions of the National League and American League, respectively. The postseason began with Game 1 of the 14th World Series on October 6 and ended with Game 6 on October 15. The White Sox defeated the Giants, four games to two, capturing their second championship in franchise history, since their previous in 1906. Going into the season, the defending World Series champions were the Boston Red Sox from the 1916 season.

== Schedule ==
The 1917 schedule consisted of 154 games for all teams in the American League and National League, each of which had eight teams. Each team was scheduled to play 22 games against the other seven teams of their respective league. This continued the format put in place for the 1904 season. This format would last until 1919.

Opening Day, April 11, featured all sixteen teams, continuing the trend which started with the 1912 season. The final day of the regular season was on October 4. The World Series took place between October 7 and October 12.

== Rule changes ==
The 1917 season saw earned run statistics and definitions added to the rules.

== Teams ==
League	Team	City	Ballpark	Capacity	Manager
American League	Boston Red Sox	Boston, Massachusetts	Fenway Park	27,000	Jack Barry
American League	Chicago White Sox	Chicago, Illinois	Comiskey Park	28,000	Pants Rowland
American League	Cleveland Indians	Cleveland, Ohio	Dunn Field	21,414	Lee Fohl
American League	Detroit Tigers	Detroit, Michigan	Navin Field	23,000	Hughie Jennings
American League	New York Yankees	New York, New York	Brush Stadium	36,000	Bill Donovan
American League	Philadelphia Athletics	Philadelphia, Pennsylvania	Shibe Park	23,000	Connie Mack
American League	St. Louis Browns	St. Louis, Missouri	Sportsman's Park	18,000	Fielder Jones
American League	Washington Senators	Washington, D.C.	National Park	27,000	Clark Griffith
National League	Boston Braves	Boston, Massachusetts	Braves Field	40,000	George Stallings
National League	Brooklyn Robins	New York, New York	Ebbets Field	30,000	Wilbert Robinson
National League	Chicago Cubs	Chicago, Illinois	Weeghman Park	15,000	Fred Mitchell
National League	Cincinnati Reds	Cincinnati, Ohio	Redland Field	20,696	Christy Mathewson
National League	New York Giants	New York, New York	Brush Stadium	36,000	John McGraw
National League	Philadelphia Phillies	Philadelphia, Pennsylvania	National League Park	18,000	Pat Moran
National League	Pittsburgh Pirates	Pittsburgh, Pennsylvania	Forbes Field	25,000	Jimmy Callahan
National League	Pittsburgh Pirates	Pittsburgh, Pennsylvania	Forbes Field	25,000	Honus Wagner
National League	Pittsburgh Pirates	Pittsburgh, Pennsylvania	Forbes Field	25,000	Hugo Bezdek
National League	St. Louis Cardinals	St. Louis, Missouri	Robison Field	21,000	Miller Huggins

== Standings ==
=== American League ===
American League
Team	W	L	Pct.	GB	Home	Road
Chicago White Sox	100	54	.649	—	56‍–‍21	44‍–‍33
Boston Red Sox	90	62	.592	9	45‍–‍33	45‍–‍29
Cleveland Indians	88	66	.571	12	44‍–‍34	44‍–‍32
Detroit Tigers	78	75	.510	21½	34‍–‍41	44‍–‍34
Washington Senators	74	79	.484	25½	42‍–‍35	32‍–‍44
New York Yankees	71	82	.464	28½	35‍–‍40	36‍–‍42
St. Louis Browns	57	97	.370	43	31‍–‍46	26‍–‍51
Philadelphia Athletics	55	98	.359	44½	29‍–‍47	26‍–‍51

=== National League ===
National League
Team	W	L	Pct.	GB	Home	Road
New York Giants	98	56	.636	—	50‍–‍28	48‍–‍28
Philadelphia Phillies	87	65	.572	10	46‍–‍29	41‍–‍36
St. Louis Cardinals	82	70	.539	15	38‍–‍38	44‍–‍32
Cincinnati Reds	78	76	.506	20	39‍–‍38	39‍–‍38
Chicago Cubs	74	80	.481	24	35‍–‍42	39‍–‍38
Boston Braves	72	81	.471	25½	35‍–‍42	37‍–‍39
Brooklyn Robins	70	81	.464	26½	36‍–‍38	34‍–‍43
Pittsburgh Pirates	51	103	.331	47	25‍–‍53	26‍–‍50

=== Tie games ===
22 tie games (9 in AL, 13 in NL), which are not factored into winning percentage or games behind (and were often replayed again) occurred throughout the season.

==== American League ====
- Boston Red Sox, 5
- Chicago White Sox, 2
- Cleveland Indians, 2
- Detroit Tigers, 1
- New York Yankees, 2
- Philadelphia Athletics, 1
- St. Louis Browns, 1
- Washington Senators, 4

==== National League ====
- Boston Braves, 4
- Brooklyn Robins, 5
- Chicago Cubs, 3
- Cincinnati Reds, 3
- New York Giants, 4
- Philadelphia Phillies, 2
- Pittsburgh Pirates, 3
- St. Louis Cardinals, 2

== Postseason ==
The postseason began on October 7 and ended on October 15 with the Chicago White Sox defeating the New York Giants in the 1917 World Series in six games.

=== Bracket ===
World Series
AL	Chicago White Sox	4
NL	New York Giants	2

== Managerial changes ==
=== Off-season ===
Team	Former Manager	New Manager
Boston Red Sox	Bill Carrigan	Jack Barry
Chicago Cubs	Joe Tinker	Fred Mitchell

=== In-season ===
Team	Former Manager	New Manager
Pittsburgh Pirates	Jimmy Callahan	Honus Wagner
Pittsburgh Pirates	Honus Wagner	Hugo Bezdek

== League leaders ==
=== American League ===
Hitting leaders
Stat	Player	Total
AVG	Ty Cobb (DET)	.383
OPS	Ty Cobb (DET)	1.014
HR	Wally Pipp (NYY)	9
RBI	Bobby Veach (DET)	110
R	Donie Bush (DET)	112
H	Ty Cobb (DET)	225
SB	Ty Cobb (DET)	55

Pitching leaders
Stat	Player	Total
W	Eddie Cicotte (CWS)	28
L	Bob Groom (SLB); Allen Sothoron (SLB)	19
ERA	Eddie Cicotte (CWS)	1.53
K	Walter Johnson (WSH)	188
IP	Eddie Cicotte (CWS)	346.2
SV	Dave Danforth (CWS)	9
WHIP	Eddie Cicotte (CWS)	0.912

=== National League ===
Hitting leaders
Stat	Player	Total
AVG	Edd Roush (CIN)	.341
OPS	Rogers Hornsby (STL)	.868
HR	Gavvy Cravath (PHI); Dave Robertson (NYG)	12
RBI	Heinie Zimmerman (NYG)	100
R	George Burns (NYG)	103
H	Heinie Groh (CIN)	182
SB	Max Carey (PIT)	46

Pitching leaders
Stat	Player	Total
W	Grover Alexander (PHI)	30
L	Jesse Barnes (BSN); Eppa Rixey (PHI)	21
ERA	Fred Anderson (NYG)	1.44
K	Grover Alexander (PHI)	200
IP	Grover Alexander (PHI)	388.0
SV	Slim Sallee (NYG)	4
WHIP	Fred Anderson (NYG)	0.963

== Milestones ==
=== Batters ===
- Honus Wagner (PIT):
  - When only counting the modern definition of a stolen base, defined in 1898, Wagner set a major league record of 703 career stolen bases in the sixth inning against the New York Giants on August 2.
- Ty Cobb (DET):
  - Recorded his 700th career stolen base with his second stolen base in the seventh inning against the Washington Senators on September 22. He became the fourth player to reach this mark.
  - Broke the modern career stolen base major league record when he stole his 704th career stolen base in the ninth inning against the Washington Senators in game one of a doubleheader on September 24, previously set just seven weeks prior.
- Eddie Collins (CWS):
  - Recorded his 500th career stolen base in the first inning against the Washington Senators on September 26. He became the 18th player to reach this mark.

=== Pitchers ===
==== No-hitters ====
- Eddie Cicotte (CWS):
  - Cicotte threw his first career no-hitter and sixth no-hitter in franchise history, by defeating St. Louis Browns 11–0 on April 14. Cicotte walked three and struck out five.
- George Mogridge (NYY):
  - Mogridge threw his first career no-hitter and first no-hitter in franchise history, by defeating the Boston Red Sox 2–1 on April 24. Mogridge walked three and struck out three.
- Fred Toney (CIN):
  - Toney threw his first career no-hitter and fourth no-hitter in franchise history, by defeating the Chicago Cubs 1–0 on May 2. Toney walked two and struck out three.
- Ernie Koob (SLB):
  - Koob threw his first career no-hitter and second no-hitter in franchise history, by defeating the Chicago White Sox 1–0 on May 5. Koob walked five and struck out two.
- Bob Groom (SLB):
  - Groom threw his first career no-hitter and third no-hitter in franchise history, by defeating the Chicago White Sox 3–0 in game 2 of a doubleheader on May 6. Groom walked three, hit one by pitch, and struck out four.
- Babe Ruth / Ernie Shore (BOS):
  - The two pitchers combined to throw the eighth no-hitter in franchise history by defeating the Washington Senators 4–0 in game 1 of a doubleheader on June 23. It was accomplished with two strikeouts and one walk. Ruth only faced one batter, walking the first batter of the game, before being thrown out for arguing balls with the umpire. Shore would face the last 26 batters (the first batter was caught stealing). It is the first combined no-hitter in league history.

== Home field attendance ==
Team name	Wins	%±	Home attendance	%±	Per game
Chicago White Sox	100	12.4%	684,521	0.7%	8,665
New York Giants	98	14.0%	500,264	−9.4%	6,253
Cleveland Indians	88	14.3%	477,298	−3.0%	6,119
Detroit Tigers	78	−10.3%	457,289	−25.9%	6,017
Boston Red Sox	90	−1.1%	387,856	−21.9%	4,848
Chicago Cubs	74	10.4%	360,218	−20.6%	4,678
Philadelphia Phillies	87	−4.4%	354,428	−31.2%	4,664
New York Yankees	71	−11.3%	330,294	−29.6%	4,404
St. Louis Cardinals	82	36.7%	288,491	28.6%	3,699
Cincinnati Reds	78	30.0%	269,056	5.2%	3,363
Brooklyn Robins	70	−25.5%	221,619	−50.5%	2,841
Philadelphia Athletics	55	52.8%	221,432	20.0%	2,914
St. Louis Browns	57	−27.8%	210,486	−37.3%	2,699
Pittsburgh Pirates	51	−21.5%	192,807	−33.3%	2,441
Boston Braves	72	−19.1%	174,253	−44.4%	2,263
Washington Senators	74	−2.6%	89,682	−49.4%	1,121

== See also ==
- 1917 in baseball (Events, Births, Deaths)
