= 1917 in baseball =

The following are the baseball events of the year 1917 throughout the world.

== Champions ==
=== Major League Baseball ===
- World Series: Chicago White Sox over New York Giants (4–2)

== MLB statistical leaders ==
| | American League | | National League | |
| Stat | Player | Total | Player | Total |
|---|---|---|---|---|
| AVG | Ty Cobb (DET) | .383 | Edd Roush (CIN) | .341 |
| HR | Wally Pipp (NYY) | 9 | Gavvy Cravath (PHI); Dave Robertson (NYG) | 12 |
| RBI | Bobby Veach (DET) | 110 | Heinie Zimmerman (NYG) | 100 |
| W | Eddie Cicotte (CWS) | 28 | Grover Alexander (PHI) | 30 |
| ERA | Eddie Cicotte (CWS) | 1.53 | Fred Anderson (NYG) | 1.44 |
| K | Walter Johnson (WSH) | 188 | Grover Alexander (PHI) | 200 |

== Major league baseball final standings ==
=== American League final standings ===
American League
| Team | W | L | Pct. | GB | Home | Road |
|---|---|---|---|---|---|---|
| Chicago White Sox | 100 | 54 | .649 | — | 56‍–‍21 | 44‍–‍33 |
| Boston Red Sox | 90 | 62 | .592 | 9 | 45‍–‍33 | 45‍–‍29 |
| Cleveland Indians | 88 | 66 | .571 | 12 | 44‍–‍34 | 44‍–‍32 |
| Detroit Tigers | 78 | 75 | .510 | 21½ | 34‍–‍41 | 44‍–‍34 |
| Washington Senators | 74 | 79 | .484 | 25½ | 42‍–‍35 | 32‍–‍44 |
| New York Yankees | 71 | 82 | .464 | 28½ | 35‍–‍40 | 36‍–‍42 |
| St. Louis Browns | 57 | 97 | .370 | 43 | 31‍–‍46 | 26‍–‍51 |
| Philadelphia Athletics | 55 | 98 | .359 | 44½ | 29‍–‍47 | 26‍–‍51 |

Locations of teams for the 1915–1922 American League seasons
American League

=== National League final standings ===
National League
| Team | W | L | Pct. | GB | Home | Road |
|---|---|---|---|---|---|---|
| New York Giants | 98 | 56 | .636 | — | 50‍–‍28 | 48‍–‍28 |
| Philadelphia Phillies | 87 | 65 | .572 | 10 | 46‍–‍29 | 41‍–‍36 |
| St. Louis Cardinals | 82 | 70 | .539 | 15 | 38‍–‍38 | 44‍–‍32 |
| Cincinnati Reds | 78 | 76 | .506 | 20 | 39‍–‍38 | 39‍–‍38 |
| Chicago Cubs | 74 | 80 | .481 | 24 | 35‍–‍42 | 39‍–‍38 |
| Boston Braves | 72 | 81 | .471 | 25½ | 35‍–‍42 | 37‍–‍39 |
| Brooklyn Robins | 70 | 81 | .464 | 26½ | 36‍–‍38 | 34‍–‍43 |
| Pittsburgh Pirates | 51 | 103 | .331 | 47 | 25‍–‍53 | 26‍–‍50 |

Locations of teams for the 1916–1919 National League seasons
National League

== Events ==
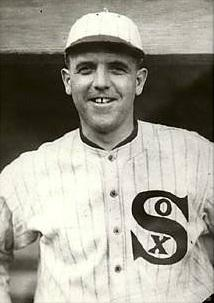
"Knuckles" Cicotte

- April 11 – At the Polo Grounds, Babe Ruth of the Boston Red Sox pitches a three-hitter in shutting down the New York Yankees on Opening Day, 1–0. Ruth's performance marks the start of good things to come. He will win 24 games this year, while leading the American League with 35 complete games.
- April 14 – Eddie Cicotte of the Chicago White Sox tosses a no-hitter in an 11–0 victory over the St. Louis Browns.
- April 24 – George Mogridge pitches a no-hitter for the New York Yankees in a 2–1 win over the Boston Red Sox.
- May 2 – In one of the most outstanding pitching duel's in baseball history, Cincinnati Reds pitcher Fred Toney tosses a 10-inning no-hitter in a 1–0 win over the Chicago Cubs. Opposing pitcher Hippo Vaughn did not surrender a hit until a one-out single in the 10th inning.
- May 5 – Ernie Koob pitches a no-hitter to lead the St. Louis Browns to a 1–0 victory over the Chicago White Sox.
- May 6 – Bob Groom of the St. Louis Browns duplicates teammate Ernie Koob's feat of the previous day by pitching a 3–0 no-hitter against the Chicago White Sox in the second game of a doubleheader at Sportsman's Park.
- May 7 – Babe Ruth pitches a shutout and drives in the game's only run on a sacrifice fly as the Red Sox top Walter Johnson and the Senators, 1–0.
- June 23 – Ernie Shore of the Boston Red Sox pitched the most notable game of his career leading his team to a 4–0 win against the Washington Senators. Babe Ruth started the game for Boston but walked the leadoff hitter, Ray Morgan. Ruth then engaged in a heated argument with home plate umpire, Brick Owens, who tossed Ruth out of the game. Then Shore came into the game to relieve Ruth. Morgan was caught stealing, and Shore retired the next 26 Senators he faced. At the time, Shore was credited with a perfect game, but since then, the criteria have been revised, and Shore's name has been removed from the record books, although he still gets credit for a combined no-hitter.
- July 6 – The Chicago White Sox put a stop to Ty Cobb's consecutive-game hitting streak, halting it at 35.
- July 15 – Boston Braves catcher Hank Gowdy reports for duty with the Ohio National Guard becoming the first Major League player to enlist for service during World War I.
- August 28 – The Indians' pennant chances suffer a severe blow when outfielder Tris Speaker is suspended after an argument with an umpire.
- October 15 – The Chicago White Sox defeat the New York Giants, 4–2, in Game 6 of the World Series to capture their second World Championship, four games to two. The White Sox were essentially dismantled following the 1920 season by baseball commissioner Kenesaw Mountain Landis due to the Black Sox Scandal in the 1919 Series. The team would not win another World Series for the next 88 years.

== Births ==
=== January ===
- January 9 – Johnny Echols
- January 13 – Stan Wentzel
- January 15 – Johnny Rucker
- January 16 – Bob Ramazzotti
- January 17 – Jocko Thompson
- January 20 – Joe Dobson
- January 22 – Huck Geary
- January 23 – Sam Jethroe
- January 24 – Danny Doyle
- January 24 – Wally Judnich
- January 25 – Carl McNabb
- January 30 – Mickey Harris
- January 30 – Al Veigel

=== February ===
- February 1 – Elmer Burkart
- February 1 – Eiji Sawamura
- February 9 – Moon Mullen
- February 10 – Roy Bruner
- February 10 – Allie Reynolds
- February 10 – Eddie Turchin
- February 12 – Dom DiMaggio
- February 14 – Augie Bergamo
- February 17 – Ed Chandler
- February 19 – Chuck Aleno
- February 19 – Tom Earley
- February 20 – Jack Bolling
- February 26 – Johnny Grodzicki
- February 27 – Rube Melton

=== March ===
- March 1 – Rankin Johnson
- March 1 – Ike Pearson
- March 2 – Jim Konstanty
- March 4 – Clyde McCullough
- March 5 – Alex Monchak
- March 6 – Walker Cress
- March 6 – Joe Orrell
- March 8 – Bill Salkeld
- March 13 – Joe Walsh
- March 15 – Charlie Bowles
- March 17 – Hank Sauer
- March 18 – Ace Williams
- March 24 – Dave Bartosch
- March 26 – Clayton Lambert
- March 29 – Tommy Holmes

=== April ===
- April 1 – Chet Ross
- April 2 – Vedie Himsl
- April 11 – Barney McCosky
- April 11 – Luis Romero Petit
- April 13 – Jim Schelle
- April 14 – Marvin Miller
- April 15 – Elmer Gedeon
- April 17 – Stan Andrews
- April 18 – Ty LaForest
- April 18 – Nick Polly
- April 18 – Vince Ventura
- April 20 – Hal Peck
- April 23 – Tony Lupien
- April 23 – Gene Smith
- April 25 – John Dagenhard
- April 26 – Sal Maglie
- April 26 – Virgil Trucks
- April 29 – Bob Whitcher

=== May ===
- May 1 – Johnny Berardino
- May 1 – Tommy Nelson
- May 3 – José Del Vecchio
- May 5 – George Dockins
- May 5 – Lennie Merullo
- May 6 – Mike McCormick
- May 7 – Al Papai
- May 8 – Harry O'Neill
- May 10 – Chet Clemens
- May 11 – Johnny Gerlach
- May 11 – Dave Short
- May 13 – Carden Gillenwater
- May 13 – Lou Stringer
- May 14 – Bob Thurman
- May 16 – George Jumonville
- May 19 – Skippy Roberge
- May 22 – Frankie Austin
- May 25 – Bert Hodges

=== June ===
- June 7 – Junior Thompson
- June 10 – Earl Henry
- June 14 – Ray Hoffman
- June 14 – Hal Manders
- June 18 – Jimmy Pofahl
- June 23 – Bubba Floyd
- June 23 – Jack Sanford
- June 24 – Al Gerheauser
- June 27 – Ethel Boyce
- June 30 – Willie Grace

=== July ===
- July 3 – Piper Davis
- July 4 – Mike Palagyi
- July 5 – Tommy Warren
- July 6 – Ken Sears
- July 10 – Hugh Alexander
- July 15 – Barney Longest
- July 17 – Lou Boudreau
- July 18 – Leo Wells
- July 21 – Mitch Chetkovich
- July 22 – Phil McCullough
- July 23 – Ray Scarborough
- July 26 – Jimmy Bloodworth
- July 27 – Bill Sayles
- July 29 – Buck Frierson

=== August ===
- August 1 – Chet Johnson
- August 3 – Milo Candini
- August 6 – John McGillen
- August 8 – Ken Raffensberger
- August 11 – Lefty Hoerst
- August 13 – Sid Gordon
- August 19 – Jim Honochick
- August 21 – Kay Heim
- August 23 – Jim Prendergast
- August 26 – George Barnicle
- August 26 – Dorothy Damaschke
- August 26 – Mike Naymick
- August 27 – Peanuts Lowrey
- August 30 – Red Embree
- August 31 – Frank Dasso

=== September ===
- September 1 – Paul Campbell
- September 3 – Frank Jelincich
- September 7 – Roy Partee
- September 12 – Russ Christopher
- September 14 – John Douglas
- September 17 – Antonio Briñez
- September 17 – Al Gettel
- September 21 – Joe Haynes
- September 22 – Anse Moore
- September 24 – Charlie Cuellar
- September 25 – Phil Rizzuto
- September 25 – Johnny Sain
- September 26 – Thurman Tucker
- September 28 – Roy Lee
- September 28 – Glen Moulder
- September 28 – Mike Ulicny
- September 29 – Eddie Feinberg

=== October ===
- October 3 – Frank Kalin
- October 4 – Hal Quick
- October 6 – Paul Calvert
- October 8 – Danny Murtaugh
- October 8 – Hal Toenes
- October 11 – Vince Castino
- October 12 – Ray Murray
- October 17 – Johnny Ostrowski
- October 18 – Loy Hanning
- October 21 – Frank Papish
- October 21 – Bob Prichard
- October 25 – Lee MacPhail
- October 27 – Bob Patrick
- October 28 – Joe Page
- October 30 – Bobby Bragan

=== November ===
- November 1 – Pat Mullin
- November 3 – Len Gilmore
- November 3 – Eli Hodkey
- November 3 – Marguerite Jones
- November 6 – Bob Repass
- November 7 – Kathryn Beare
- November 9 – Bob Neighbors
- November 11 – Pat Scantlebury
- November 16 – Ed Busch
- November 20 – Jess Dobernic
- November 20 – Felix Mackiewicz
- November 20 – Mike Schemer
- November 23 – Jake Caulfield
- November 23 – Herman Reich
- November 25 – Len Perme
- November 26 – Pat Cooper
- November 26 – Mike Kosman

=== December ===
- December 1 – Marty Marion
- December 9 – George Woodend
- December 10 – Andy Tomasic
- December 12 – Bob Carpenter
- December 12 – Clyde Kluttz
- December 16 – Jim Pruett
- December 18 – Margaret Stefani
- December 19 – Ray Poat
- December 27 – Herb Karpel

== Deaths ==
=== January–March ===
- January 3 – Rynie Wolters, 74, Dutch pitcher and outfielder who hit .318 and posted a 19–23 record with the New York Mutuals, Cleveland Forest Citys and Elizabeth Resolutes between 1871 and 1873.
- January 10 – Jack McFetridge, 47, pitcher who played in 1890 and 1903 with the Philadelphia Phillies of the National League.
- January 13 – Jim Garry, 47, pitcher for the 1893 Boston Beaneaters.
- January 16 – Charlie Geggus, 54, pitcher who posted a 10–9 record and a 2.54 ERA for the 1884 Washington Nationals of the Union Association.
- January 17 – Pat McCauley, 46, backup catcher who played between 1893 and 1903 for the St. Louis Browns, Washington Senators and New York Highlanders.
- January 19 – Charlie Enwright, 29, shortstop who played for the 1909 St. Louis Cardinals.
- January 26 – Jim McGuire, 41, shortstop for the 1901 Cleveland Blues of the American League.
- January 30 – Cyclone Ryan, 51, Irish pitcher and first baseman who played for the 1887 New York Metropolitans and the 1891 Boston Beaneaters.
- January 31 – Pete O'Brien, 39, second baseman for the Cincinnati Reds, St. Louis Browns, Cleveland Naps and Washington Senators between 1901 and 1907.
- February 7 – Tim Murnane, 66, first baseman and center fielder in the early years of professional baseball who became president of the New England League and went on to a distinguished tenure as sports editor of The Boston Globe for over 30 years, serving as one of the sport's leading advocates.
- February 18 – Charlie Fisher, 64, third baseman who played for the Kansas City Cowboys and the Chicago Browns of the Union Association in the 1884 season.
- February 18 – William Kerr, 69, co-owner of the Pittsburgh Pirates (1893–1900).
- February 23 – Art Weaver, 37, catcher and infielder who played with the Cardinals, Pirates, Browns and White Sox between 1902 and 1908.
- February 28 – Parson Nicholson, 53, second baseman who played for the Detroit Wolverines, Toledo Maumees and Washington Senators between 1888 and 1895.
- March 4 – Joe Dowie, 51, backup outfielder for the 1889 Baltimore Orioles of the National League.
- March 9 – Cooney Snyder, 45, Canadian catcher who played for the 1898 Louisville Colonels.
- March 15 – John Munce, 69, outfielder for the 1884 Wilmington Quicksteps of the Union Association.
- March 27 – Willie Jensen, 27, American League pitcher who played for the 1912 Detroit Tigers and the 1914 Philadelphia Athletics.

=== April–June ===
- April 5 – Frank McLaughlin, 60, utility infielder and outfielder who played from 1882 through 1884 for five teams in three different leagues.
- April 9 – Charlie Gould, 69, first baseman for the original Cincinnati Red Stockings of 1869 and 1870, the first team consisting entirely of professional players.
- May 19 – Pat McManus, 54, who pitched for the Indianapolis Hoosiers (1889) and Philadelphia Phillies (1894) of the National League.
- May 25 – Willie Sudhoff, 42, pitcher for six different teams from 1897 to 1906, who became the first to play for all St. Louis clubs both in the National and American leagues.
- May 27 – Tom Ford, 50, American Association pitcher and shortstop for the Columbus Solons and the Brooklyn Gladiators during the 1890 season.
- June 10 – Jack Fanning, 54, pitcher for the 1889 Indianapolis Hoosiers and 1894 Philadelphia Phillies.

=== July–September ===
- July 1 – Al Buckenberger, 56, manager for four teams between 1889 and 1904, mainly for the Pittsburgh Pirates and the Boston Beaneaters of the National League.
- July 1 – Henry Mathewson, 30, pitcher for the National League New York Giants in the 1906 and 1907 seasons.
- July 16 – Dick Butler, 47, backup catcher for the 1897 Louisville Colonels and the 1899 Washington Senators.
- July 27 – John Schappert, [?], who pitched for the St. Louis Brown Stockings of the American Association in the 1882 season.
- July 28 – Whitey Ritterson, 62, catcher for the 1876 Philadelphia Athletics.
- August 7 – Bill Loughran, 55, catcher for the 1884 New York Gothams of the National League.
- August 24 – Al McCauley, 54, first baseman and pitcher for the Indianapolis Hoosiers, Philadelphia Phillies and Washington Statesmen between the 1884 and 1891 seasons.
- August 27 – Cy Alberts, 35, pitcher for the 1910 St. Louis Cardinals.
- September 13 – Gene Derby, 57, catcher for the 1885 Baltimore Orioles of the American Association.

=== October–December ===
- October 12 – Bill Clay, 42, backup outfielder for the 1902 Philadelphia Phillies.
- November 1 – Steve Brady, 66, outfielder who played between 1874 and 1886 for the Hartford Dark Blues, Washington Nationals and New York Metropolitans.
- November 19 – King Bailey, 47, pitcher for the 1895 Cincinnati Reds.
- December 2 – Mike Hooper, 67, National Association outfielder for the Baltimore Marylands between 1868 and 1873, who led his team in runs scored from 1868 to 1870.
- December 17 – Frank Burlingame, 64, National League and Union Association umpire
- December 20 – Will Calihan, 48, American Association pitcher who played from 1890 to 1891 with the Rochester Broncos and Philadelphia Athletics.
