= 1918 Brooklyn Robins season =

1918 Brooklyn Robins
- League: National League
- Ballpark: Ebbets Field
- City: Brooklyn, New York
- Record: 57–69 (.452)
- League place: 5th
- Owners: Charles Ebbets, Ed McKeever, Stephen McKeever
- President: Charles Ebbets
- Managers: Wilbert Robinson

The 1918 Brooklyn Robins finished the season in fifth place.

== Offseason ==
- January 9, 1918: Casey Stengel and George Cutshaw were traded by the Robins to the Pittsburgh Pirates for Chuck Ward, Burleigh Grimes and Al Mamaux.

== Regular season ==
=== Season standings ===
National League
Team	W	L	Pct.	GB	Home	Road
Chicago Cubs	84	45	.651	—	49‍–‍25	35‍–‍20
New York Giants	71	53	.573	10½	35‍–‍21	36‍–‍32
Cincinnati Reds	68	60	.531	15½	46‍–‍24	22‍–‍36
Pittsburgh Pirates	65	60	.520	17	42‍–‍28	23‍–‍32
Brooklyn Robins	57	69	.452	25½	33‍–‍21	24‍–‍48
Philadelphia Phillies	55	68	.447	26	27‍–‍29	28‍–‍39
Boston Braves	53	71	.427	28½	23‍–‍29	30‍–‍42
St. Louis Cardinals	51	78	.395	33	32‍–‍40	19‍–‍38

=== Record vs. opponents ===
1918 National League record Sources:
Team	BSN	BRO	CHC	CIN	NYG	PHI	PIT	STL
Boston	—	8–6	5–14	10–8	1–15	7–12	10–9	12–7
Brooklyn	6–8	—	10–9	6–12	8–12	9–8	10–9	8–11
Chicago	14–5	9–10	—	10–7–1	14–6	12–6	10–8–1	15–3
Cincinnati	8–10	12–6	7–10–1	—	12–7	12–7	4–12	13–8
New York	15–1	12–8	6–14	7–12	—	10–3	8–11	13–4
Philadelphia	12–7	8–9	6–12	7–12	3–10	—	11–7	8–11–2
Pittsburgh	9–10	9–10	8–10–1	12–4	11–8	7–11	—	9–7
St. Louis	7–12	11–8	3–15	8–13	4–13	11–8–2	7–9	—

=== Notable transactions ===
- July 15, 1918: George Smith was purchased by the Robins from the New York Giants.
- August 21, 1918: Jimmy Archer was purchased from the Robins by the Cincinnati Reds.
- October 1918: George Smith was purchased from the Robins by the New York Giants.

=== Roster ===
1918 Brooklyn Robins
Roster
Pitchers: Leon Cadore; Larry Cheney; Jack Coombs; Rich Durning; Burleigh Grimes; Dan Griner; Jake Hehl; Harry Heitmann; Marty Herrmann; Al Mamaux; Rube Marquard; Jeff Pfeffer; Norman Plitt; Dick Robertson; John Russell; George Smith	Catchers: Jimmy Archer; Ernie Krueger; Otto Miller; Mack Wheat; Infielders: Jake Daubert; Mickey Doolan; Ollie O'Mara; Frank O'Rourke; Ivy Olson; Ray Schmandt; Red Sheridan; Chuck Ward	Outfielders: Al Baschang; Jim Hickman; Jimmy Johnston; Clarence Mitchell; Hy Myers; Al Nixon; Zack Wheat	Manager: Wilbert Robinson

== Player stats ==
=== Batting ===
==== Starters by position ====
Note: Pos = Position; G = Games played; AB = At bats; H = Hits; Avg. = Batting average; HR = Home runs; RBI = Runs batted in

Pos	Player	G	AB	H	Avg.	HR	RBI
C	Otto Miller	75	228	44	.193	0	8
1B	Jake Daubert	108	396	122	.308	2	47
2B	Mickey Doolan	92	308	55	.179	0	18
3B	Ollie O'Mara	121	450	96	.213	1	24
SS	Ivy Olson	126	506	121	.239	1	17
OF	Hy Myers	107	407	104	.256	4	40
OF	Zack Wheat	105	409	137	.335	0	51
OF	Jimmy Johnston	123	484	136	.281	0	27

==== Other batters ====
Note: G = Games played; AB = At bats; H = Hits; Avg. = Batting average; HR = Home runs; RBI = Runs batted in

Player	G	AB	H	Avg.	HR	RBI
Jim Hickman	53	167	39	.234	1	16
Mack Wheat	57	157	34	.217	1	3
Ray Schmandt	34	114	35	.307	0	18
Ernie Krueger	30	87	25	.287	0	7
Clarence Mitchell	10	24	6	.250	0	2
Jimmy Archer	9	22	6	.273	0	0
Frank O'Rourke	4	12	2	.167	0	2
Al Nixon	6	11	5	.455	0	0
Chuck Ward	2	6	2	.333	0	3
Al Baschang	2	5	1	.200	0	0
Red Sheridan	2	4	1	.250	0	0

=== Pitching ===
==== Starting pitchers ====
Note: G = Games pitched; IP = Innings pitched; W = Wins; L = Losses; ERA = Earned run average; SO = Strikeouts

Player	G	IP	W	L	ERA	SO
Burleigh Grimes	40	270.0	19	9	2.13	113
Rube Marquard	34	239.0	9	18	2.64	89
Jack Coombs	27	189.0	8	14	3.81	44
Dick Robertson	13	87.0	3	6	2.59	18
Leon Cadore	2	17.0	1	0	0.53	5
Jeff Pfeffer	1	9.0	1	0	0.00	1
Clarence Mitchell	1	0.1	0	1	108.00	0
Harry Heitmann	1	0.0	0	1	inf	0

==== Other pitchers ====
Note: G = Games pitched; IP = Innings pitched; W = Wins; L = Losses; ERA = Earned run average; SO = Strikeouts

Player	G	IP	W	L	ERA	SO
Larry Cheney	32	200.2	11	13	3.00	83
Dan Griner	11	54.1	1	5	2.15	22
George Smith	8	50.0	4	1	2.34	18
Al Mamaux	2	8.0	0	1	6.75	2

==== Relief pitchers ====
Note: G = Games pitched; W = Wins; L = Losses; SV = Saves; ERA = Earned run average; SO = Strikeouts

Player	G	W	L	SV	ERA	SO
Rich Durning	1	0	0	0	13.50	0
Norman Plitt	1	0	0	0	4.50	0
Jake Hehl	1	0	0	0	0.00	0
Marty Herrmann	1	0	0	0	0.00	0
John Russell	1	0	0	0	18.00	0
