= 1918 St. Louis Cardinals season =

Major League Baseball season

1918 St. Louis Cardinals
- League: National League
- Ballpark: Cardinal Field
- City: St. Louis, Missouri
- Record: 51–78 (.395)
- League place: 8th
- Owners: Sam Breadon
- Managers: Jack Hendricks

The 1918 St. Louis Cardinals season was the team's 37th season in St. Louis, Missouri and its 27th season in the National League. The Cardinals went 51–78 during the season and finished eighth in the National League. It was the seventh time in their history they had finished last in the National League. It would be the last time the Cardinals would finish in last place until 1990, when they finished sixth in the National League East.

== Regular season ==
=== Season standings ===
National League
| Team | W | L | Pct. | GB | Home | Road |
|---|---|---|---|---|---|---|
| Chicago Cubs | 84 | 45 | .651 | — | 49‍–‍25 | 35‍–‍20 |
| New York Giants | 71 | 53 | .573 | 10½ | 35‍–‍21 | 36‍–‍32 |
| Cincinnati Reds | 68 | 60 | .531 | 15½ | 46‍–‍24 | 22‍–‍36 |
| Pittsburgh Pirates | 65 | 60 | .520 | 17 | 42‍–‍28 | 23‍–‍32 |
| Brooklyn Robins | 57 | 69 | .452 | 25½ | 33‍–‍21 | 24‍–‍48 |
| Philadelphia Phillies | 55 | 68 | .447 | 26 | 27‍–‍29 | 28‍–‍39 |
| Boston Braves | 53 | 71 | .427 | 28½ | 23‍–‍29 | 30‍–‍42 |
| St. Louis Cardinals | 51 | 78 | .395 | 33 | 32‍–‍40 | 19‍–‍38 |

=== Record vs. opponents ===
1918 National League record Sources:
| Team | BSN | BRO | CHC | CIN | NYG | PHI | PIT | STL |
|---|---|---|---|---|---|---|---|---|
| Boston | — | 8–6 | 5–14 | 10–8 | 1–15 | 7–12 | 10–9 | 12–7 |
| Brooklyn | 6–8 | — | 10–9 | 6–12 | 8–12 | 9–8 | 10–9 | 8–11 |
| Chicago | 14–5 | 9–10 | — | 10–7–1 | 14–6 | 12–6 | 10–8–1 | 15–3 |
| Cincinnati | 8–10 | 12–6 | 7–10–1 | — | 12–7 | 12–7 | 4–12 | 13–8 |
| New York | 15–1 | 12–8 | 6–14 | 7–12 | — | 10–3 | 8–11 | 13–4 |
| Philadelphia | 12–7 | 8–9 | 6–12 | 7–12 | 3–10 | — | 11–7 | 8–11–2 |
| Pittsburgh | 9–10 | 9–10 | 8–10–1 | 12–4 | 11–8 | 7–11 | — | 9–7 |
| St. Louis | 7–12 | 11–8 | 3–15 | 8–13 | 4–13 | 11–8–2 | 7–9 | — |

=== Roster ===
1918 St. Louis Cardinals
Roster
| Pitchers: Red Ames; Bill Doak; Oscar Horstmann; Earl Howard; Rankin Johnson; Jakie May; Lee Meadows; Gene Packard; Bill Sherdel; Oscar Tuero | Catchers: John Brock; Mike González; Frank Snyder; Infielders: Doug Baird; Bruno Betzel; Herman Bronkie; Tony Brottem; Dutch Distel; Bob Fisher; Charlie Grimm; Rogers Hornsby; Bob Larmore; Bert Niehoff; Gene Paulette; Bobby Wallace | Outfielders: George Anderson; Johnny Beall; Walton Cruise; Cliff Heathcote; Marty Kavanagh; Wally Mattick; Austin McHenry; Ted Menze; Jack Smith; Red Smyth; Dick Wheeler | Manager: Jack Hendricks |

== Player stats ==
=== Batting ===
==== Starters by position ====
Note: Pos = Position; G = Games played; AB = At bats; H = Hits; Avg. = Batting average; HR = Home runs; RBI = Runs batted in

| Pos | Player | G | AB | H | Avg. | HR | RBI |
|---|---|---|---|---|---|---|---|
| C | Mike González | 117 | 349 | 88 | .252 | 3 | 20 |
| 1B | Gene Paulette | 125 | 461 | 126 | .273 | 0 | 52 |
| 2B | Bob Fisher | 63 | 246 | 78 | .317 | 2 | 20 |
| SS | Rogers Hornsby | 115 | 416 | 117 | .281 | 5 | 60 |
| 3B | Doug Baird | 82 | 316 | 78 | .247 | 2 | 25 |
| OF | Cliff Heathcote | 88 | 348 | 90 | .259 | 4 | 32 |
| OF | Austin McHenry | 80 | 272 | 71 | .261 | 1 | 29 |
| OF | Walton Cruise | 70 | 240 | 65 | .271 | 6 | 39 |

==== Other batters ====
Note: G = Games played; AB = At bats; H = Hits; Avg. = Batting average; HR = Home runs; RBI = Runs batted in

| Player | G | AB | H | Avg. | HR | RBI |
|---|---|---|---|---|---|---|
| Bruno Betzel | 76 | 230 | 51 | .222 | 0 | 13 |
| Jack Smith | 42 | 166 | 35 | .211 | 0 | 4 |
| Charlie Grimm | 50 | 141 | 31 | .220 | 0 | 12 |
| George Anderson | 35 | 132 | 39 | .295 | 0 | 6 |
| Red Smyth | 40 | 113 | 24 | .212 | 0 | 4 |
| Frank Snyder | 39 | 112 | 28 | .250 | 0 | 10 |
| Bobby Wallace | 32 | 98 | 15 | .153 | 0 | 4 |
| Bert Niehoff | 22 | 84 | 15 | .179 | 0 | 5 |
| Herman Bronkie | 18 | 68 | 15 | .221 | 1 | 7 |
| John Brock | 27 | 52 | 11 | .212 | 0 | 4 |
| Johnny Beall | 19 | 49 | 11 | .224 | 0 | 6 |
| Marty Kavanagh | 12 | 44 | 8 | .182 | 1 | 8 |
| Dutch Distel | 8 | 17 | 3 | .176 | 0 | 1 |
| Wally Mattick | 8 | 14 | 2 | .143 | 0 | 1 |
| Bob Larmore | 4 | 7 | 2 | .286 | 0 | 1 |
| Dick Wheeler | 3 | 6 | 0 | .000 | 0 | 0 |
| Tony Brottem | 2 | 4 | 0 | .000 | 0 | 0 |
| Ted Menze | 2 | 3 | 0 | .000 | 0 | 0 |

=== Pitching ===
==== Starting pitchers ====
Note: G = Games pitched; IP = Innings pitched; W = Wins; L = Losses; ERA = Earned run average; SO = Strikeouts

| Player | G | IP | W | L | ERA | SO |
|---|---|---|---|---|---|---|
| Bill Doak | 31 | 211.0 | 9 | 15 | 2.43 | 74 |
| Red Ames | 27 | 206.2 | 9 | 14 | 2.31 | 68 |
| Gene Packard | 30 | 182.1 | 12 | 12 | 3.50 | 46 |
| Lee Meadows | 30 | 165.1 | 8 | 14 | 3.59 | 49 |

==== Other pitchers ====
Note: G = Games pitched; IP = Innings pitched; W = Wins; L = Losses; ERA = Earned run average; SO = Strikeouts

| Player | G | IP | W | L | ERA | SO |
|---|---|---|---|---|---|---|
| Bill Sherdel | 35 | 182.1 | 6 | 12 | 2.71 | 40 |
| Jakie May | 29 | 152.2 | 5 | 6 | 3.83 | 61 |
| Oscar Tuero | 11 | 44.1 | 1 | 2 | 1.02 | 13 |
| Rankin Johnson Sr. | 6 | 23.0 | 1 | 1 | 2.74 | 4 |
| Oscar Horstmann | 9 | 23.0 | 0 | 2 | 5.48 | 6 |

==== Relief pitchers ====
Note: G = Games pitched; W = Wins; L = Losses; SV = Saves; ERA = Earned run average; SO = Strikeouts

| Player | G | W | L | SV | ERA | SO |
|---|---|---|---|---|---|---|
| Earl Howard | 1 | 0 | 0 | 0 | 0.00 | 0 |
| Gene Paulette | 1 | 0 | 0 | 0 | 0.00 | 0 |
