= 1918 Boston Braves season =

1918 Boston Braves
- League: National League
- Ballpark: Braves Field
- City: Boston, Massachusetts
- Record: 53–71 (.427)
- League place: 7th
- Owners: Percy Haughton
- Managers: George Stallings

The 1918 Boston Braves season was the 48th season of the franchise. The Braves finished seventh in the National League with a record of 53 wins and 71 losses.

== Regular season ==
=== Season standings ===
National League
Team	W	L	Pct.	GB	Home	Road
Chicago Cubs	84	45	.651	—	49‍–‍25	35‍–‍20
New York Giants	71	53	.573	10½	35‍–‍21	36‍–‍32
Cincinnati Reds	68	60	.531	15½	46‍–‍24	22‍–‍36
Pittsburgh Pirates	65	60	.520	17	42‍–‍28	23‍–‍32
Brooklyn Robins	57	69	.452	25½	33‍–‍21	24‍–‍48
Philadelphia Phillies	55	68	.447	26	27‍–‍29	28‍–‍39
Boston Braves	53	71	.427	28½	23‍–‍29	30‍–‍42
St. Louis Cardinals	51	78	.395	33	32‍–‍40	19‍–‍38

=== Record vs. opponents ===
1918 National League record Sources:
Team	BSN	BRO	CHC	CIN	NYG	PHI	PIT	STL
Boston	—	8–6	5–14	10–8	1–15	7–12	10–9	12–7
Brooklyn	6–8	—	10–9	6–12	8–12	9–8	10–9	8–11
Chicago	14–5	9–10	—	10–7–1	14–6	12–6	10–8–1	15–3
Cincinnati	8–10	12–6	7–10–1	—	12–7	12–7	4–12	13–8
New York	15–1	12–8	6–14	7–12	—	10–3	8–11	13–4
Philadelphia	12–7	8–9	6–12	7–12	3–10	—	11–7	8–11–2
Pittsburgh	9–10	9–10	8–10–1	12–4	11–8	7–11	—	9–7
St. Louis	7–12	11–8	3–15	8–13	4–13	11–8–2	7–9	—

=== Roster ===
1918 Boston Braves
Roster
Pitchers: Hugh Canavan; Doc Crandall; Cal Crum; Dana Fillingim; Lefty George; Bunny Hearn; Tom Hughes; Hugh McQuillan; Art Nehf; Jake Northrop; Pat Ragan; Dick Rudolph; Bill Upham	Catchers: John Henry; Walt Tragesser; Bill Wagner; Art Wilson; Infielders: Rip Conway; Buck Herzog; Ed Konetchy; Rabbit Maranville; Johnny Rawlings; Jimmy Smith; Red Smith; Zeb Terry	Outfielders: Chet Chadbourne; Jim Kelly; Joe Kelly; Red Massey; Buzz Murphy; Ray Powell; Wally Rehg; Al Wickland; Other batters: Fred Bailey; Doc Bass; Sam Covington; Tom Miller	Manager: George Stallings

== Player stats ==
=== Batting ===
==== Starters by position ====
Note: Pos = Position; G = Games played; AB = At bats; H = Hits; Avg. = Batting average; HR = Home runs; RBI = Runs batted in

Pos	Player	G	AB	H	Avg.	HR	RBI
C	Art Wilson	89	280	69	.246	0	19
1B	Ed Konetchy	119	437	103	.236	2	56
2B	Buck Herzog	118	473	108	.228	0	26
SS	Johnny Rawlings	111	410	85	.207	0	21
3B	Red Smith	119	429	128	.298	2	65
OF	Red Massey	66	203	59	.291	0	18
OF	Al Wickland	95	332	87	.262	4	32
OF	Ray Powell	53	188	40	.213	0	20

==== Other batters ====
Note: G = Games played; AB = At bats; H = Hits; Avg. = Batting average; HR = Home runs; RBI = Runs batted in

Player	G	AB	H	Avg.	HR	RBI
Joe Kelly	47	155	36	.232	0	15
Jim Kelly	35	146	48	.329	0	4
Wally Rehg	40	133	32	.241	1	12
Zeb Terry	28	105	32	.305	0	8
Chet Chadbourne	27	104	27	.260	0	6
John Henry	43	102	21	.206	0	4
Jimmy Smith	34	102	23	.225	1	14
Bill Wagner	13	47	10	.213	1	7
Rabbit Maranville	11	38	12	.316	0	3
Buzz Murphy	9	32	12	.375	1	9
Rip Conway	14	24	4	.167	0	2
Fred Bailey	4	4	1	.250	0	0
Sam Covington	3	3	1	.333	0	0
Tom Miller	2	2	0	.000	0	0
Doc Bass	2	1	1	1.000	0	0
Walt Tragesser	7	1	0	.000	0	0

=== Pitching ===
==== Starting pitchers ====
Note: G = Games pitched; IP = Innings pitched; W = Wins; L = Losses; ERA = Earned run average; SO = Strikeouts

Player	G	IP	W	L	ERA	SO
Art Nehf	32	284.1	15	15	2.69	96
Pat Ragan	30	206.1	8	17	3.23	68
Dick Rudolph	21	154.0	9	10	2.57	48
Bunny Hearn	17	126.1	5	6	2.49	30
Dana Fillingim	14	113.0	7	6	2.23	29
Tom Hughes	3	18.1	0	2	3.44	9
Hugh McQuillan	1	9.0	1	0	3.00	1
Ed Konetchy	1	8.0	0	1	6.75	3
Cal Crum	1	2.1	0	1	15.43	0

==== Other pitchers ====
Note: G = Games pitched; IP = Innings pitched; W = Wins; L = Losses; ERA = Earned run average; SO = Strikeouts

Player	G	IP	W	L	ERA	SO
Lefty George	9	54.1	1	5	2.32	22
Hugh Canavan	11	46.2	0	4	6.36	18
Jake Northrop	7	40.0	5	1	1.35	4
Doc Crandall	5	34.0	1	2	2.38	4
Bill Upham	3	20.2	1	1	5.23	8
