= 1918 Philadelphia Phillies season =

Major League Baseball season

1918 Philadelphia Phillies
- League: National League
- Ballpark: Baker Bowl
- City: Philadelphia, Pennsylvania
- Owners: William F. Baker
- Managers: Pat Moran

The 1918 Philadelphia Phillies season was a season in American baseball. The team finished sixth in the National League with a record of 55–68, 26 games behind the first-place Chicago Cubs. This season marked the first of thirty losing seasons in thirty-one years for the Phillies.

== Regular season ==
=== Season standings ===
National League
Team	W	L	Pct.	GB	Home	Road
Chicago Cubs	84	45	.651	—	49‍–‍25	35‍–‍20
New York Giants	71	53	.573	10½	35‍–‍21	36‍–‍32
Cincinnati Reds	68	60	.531	15½	46‍–‍24	22‍–‍36
Pittsburgh Pirates	65	60	.520	17	42‍–‍28	23‍–‍32
Brooklyn Robins	57	69	.452	25½	33‍–‍21	24‍–‍48
Philadelphia Phillies	55	68	.447	26	27‍–‍29	28‍–‍39
Boston Braves	53	71	.427	28½	23‍–‍29	30‍–‍42
St. Louis Cardinals	51	78	.395	33	32‍–‍40	19‍–‍38

=== Record vs. opponents ===
1918 National League record Sources:
Team	BSN	BRO	CHC	CIN	NYG	PHI	PIT	STL
Boston	—	8–6	5–14	10–8	1–15	7–12	10–9	12–7
Brooklyn	6–8	—	10–9	6–12	8–12	9–8	10–9	8–11
Chicago	14–5	9–10	—	10–7–1	14–6	12–6	10–8–1	15–3
Cincinnati	8–10	12–6	7–10–1	—	12–7	12–7	4–12	13–8
New York	15–1	12–8	6–14	7–12	—	10–3	8–11	13–4
Philadelphia	12–7	8–9	6–12	7–12	3–10	—	11–7	8–11–2
Pittsburgh	9–10	9–10	8–10–1	12–4	11–8	7–11	—	9–7
St. Louis	7–12	11–8	3–15	8–13	4–13	11–8–2	7–9	—

=== Roster ===
1918 Philadelphia Phillies
Roster
Pitchers: Dixie Davis; Gary Fortune; Brad Hogg; Elmer Jacobs; Alex Main; Erskine Mayer; Joe Oeschger; Mike Prendergast; Ben Tincup; Milt Watson; Frank Woodward	Catchers: Bert Adams; Ed Burns; Mickey Devine; Pickles Dillhoefer; Infielders: Dave Bancroft; Ed Hemingway; Fred Luderus; Patsy McGaffigan; Harry Pearce; Milt Stock	Outfielders: Gavvy Cravath; Mike Fitzgerald; Irish Meusel; Ty Pickup; Possum Whitted; Cy Williams	Manager: Pat Moran

== Player stats ==
=== Batting ===
==== Starters by position ====
Note: Pos = Position; G = Games played; AB = At bats; H = Hits; Avg. = Batting average; HR = Home runs; RBI = Runs batted in

Pos	Player	G	AB	H	Avg.	HR	RBI
C	Bert Adams	84	227	40	.176	0	12
1B	Fred Luderus	125	468	135	.288	5	67
2B	Patsy McGaffigan	54	192	39	.203	1	8
SS	Dave Bancroft	125	499	132	.265	0	26
3B	Milt Stock	123	481	132	.274	1	42
OF	Gavvy Cravath	121	426	99	.232	8	54
OF	Irish Meusel	124	473	132	.279	4	62
OF	Cy Williams	94	351	97	.276	6	39

==== Other batters ====
Note: G = Games played; AB = At bats; H = Hits; Avg. = Batting average; HR = Home runs; RBI = Runs batted in

Player	G	AB	H	Avg.	HR	RBI
Ed Burns	68	184	38	.207	0	9
Harry Pearce	60	164	40	.244	0	18
Mike Fitzgerald	66	133	39	.293	0	6
Ed Hemingway	33	108	23	.213	0	12
Possum Whitted	24	86	21	.244	0	3
Pickles Dillhoefer	8	11	1	.091	0	0
Mickey Devine	4	8	1	.125	0	0
Ty Pickup	1	1	1	1.000	0	0

=== Pitching ===
==== Starting pitchers ====
Note: G = Games pitched; IP = Innings pitched; W = Wins; L = Losses; ERA = Earned run average; SO = Strikeouts

Player	G	IP	W	L	ERA	SO
Mike Prendergast	33	252.1	13	14	2.89	41
Brad Hogg	29	228.0	13	13	2.53	81
Joe Oeschger	30	184.0	6	18	3.03	60
Elmer Jacobs	18	123.0	9	5	2.41	33
Erskine Mayer	13	104.0	7	4	3.12	16

==== Other pitchers ====
Note: G = Games pitched; IP = Innings pitched; W = Wins; L = Losses; ERA = Earned run average; SO = Strikeouts

Player	G	IP	W	L	ERA	SO
Milt Watson	23	112.2	5	7	3.43	29
Alex Main	8	35.0	2	2	4.63	14
Gary Fortune	5	31.0	0	2	8.13	10
Ben Tincup	8	16.2	0	1	7.56	6

==== Relief pitchers ====
Note: G = Games pitched; W = Wins; L = Losses; SV = Saves; ERA = Earned run average; SO = Strikeouts

Player	G	W	L	SV	ERA	SO
Dixie Davis	17	0	2	0	3.06	18
Frank Woodward	2	0	0	0	6.00	4
