= 1918 Chicago Cubs season =

1918 Chicago Cubs
- National League champions
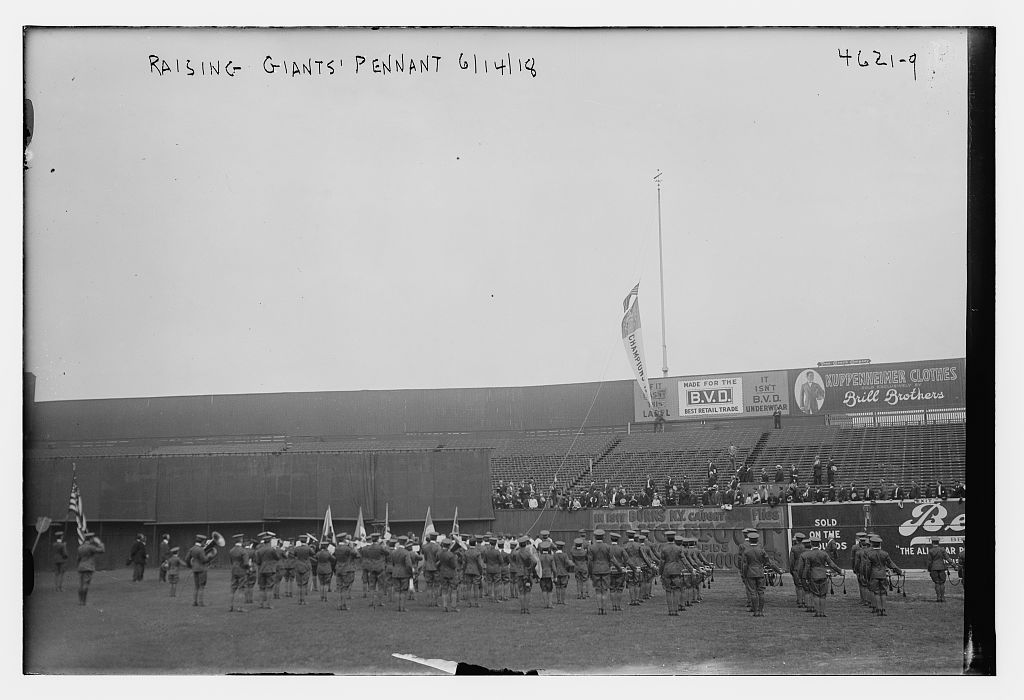
- League: National League
- Ballpark: Weeghman Park
- City: Chicago
- Record: 84–45 (.651)
- League place: 1st
- Owners: Charles Weeghman
- Managers: Fred Mitchell

The 1918 Chicago Cubs season was the 47th season of the Chicago Cubs franchise, the 43rd in the National League and the third at Wrigley Field (then known as "Weeghman Park"). The Cubs finished first in the National League with a record of 84–45, 10.5 games ahead of the second place New York Giants. The team was defeated four games to two by the Boston Red Sox in the 1918 World Series.

== Regular season ==
=== Season standings ===
National League
Team	W	L	Pct.	GB	Home	Road
Chicago Cubs	84	45	.651	—	49‍–‍25	35‍–‍20
New York Giants	71	53	.573	10½	35‍–‍21	36‍–‍32
Cincinnati Reds	68	60	.531	15½	46‍–‍24	22‍–‍36
Pittsburgh Pirates	65	60	.520	17	42‍–‍28	23‍–‍32
Brooklyn Robins	57	69	.452	25½	33‍–‍21	24‍–‍48
Philadelphia Phillies	55	68	.447	26	27‍–‍29	28‍–‍39
Boston Braves	53	71	.427	28½	23‍–‍29	30‍–‍42
St. Louis Cardinals	51	78	.395	33	32‍–‍40	19‍–‍38

=== Record vs. opponents ===
1918 National League record Sources:
Team	BSN	BRO	CHC	CIN	NYG	PHI	PIT	STL
Boston	—	8–6	5–14	10–8	1–15	7–12	10–9	12–7
Brooklyn	6–8	—	10–9	6–12	8–12	9–8	10–9	8–11
Chicago	14–5	9–10	—	10–7–1	14–6	12–6	10–8–1	15–3
Cincinnati	8–10	12–6	7–10–1	—	12–7	12–7	4–12	13–8
New York	15–1	12–8	6–14	7–12	—	10–3	8–11	13–4
Philadelphia	12–7	8–9	6–12	7–12	3–10	—	11–7	8–11–2
Pittsburgh	9–10	9–10	8–10–1	12–4	11–8	7–11	—	9–7
St. Louis	7–12	11–8	3–15	8–13	4–13	11–8–2	7–9	—

== Roster ==
1918 Chicago Cubs
Roster
Pitchers: Vic Aldridge; Pete Alexander; Paul Carter; Phil Douglas; Claude Hendrix; Speed Martin; Buddy Napier; Lefty Tyler; Hippo Vaughn; Roy Walker; Harry Weaver	Catchers: Tommy Clarke; Tom Daly; Rowdy Elliott; Bill Killefer; Bob O'Farrell; Infielders: Charlie Deal; Charlie Hollocher; Pete Kilduff; Bill McCabe; Fred Merkle; Charlie Pick; Chuck Wortman; Rollie Zeider	Outfielders: Turner Barber; Max Flack; Les Mann; Dode Paskert; Other batters: Fred Lear	Manager: Fred Mitchell

== Player stats ==
=== Batting ===
==== Starters by position ====
Note: Pos = Position; G = Games played; AB = At bats; H = Hits; Avg. = Batting average; HR = Home runs; RBI = Runs batted in

Pos	Player	G	AB	H	Avg.	HR	RBI
C	Bill Killefer	104	331	77	.233	0	22
1B	Fred Merkle	129	482	143	.297	3	65
2B	Rollie Zeider	82	251	56	.223	0	26
SS	Charlie Hollocher	131	509	161	.316	2	38
3B	Charlie Deal	119	414	99	.239	2	34
OF	Dode Paskert	127	461	132	.286	3	59
OF	Les Mann	129	489	141	.288	2	55
OF	Max Flack	123	478	123	.257	4	41

==== Other batters ====
Note: G = Games played; AB = At bats; H = Hits; Avg. = Batting average; HR = Home runs; RBI = Runs batted in

Player	G	AB	H	Avg.	HR	RBI
Turner Barber	55	123	29	.236	0	10
Bob O'Farrell	52	113	32	.283	1	14
Pete Kilduff	30	93	19	.204	0	13
Charlie Pick	29	89	29	.326	0	12
Bill McCabe	29	45	8	.178	0	5
Chuck Wortman	17	17	2	.118	1	3
Rowdy Elliott	5	10	0	.000	0	0
Fred Lear	2	1	0	.000	0	0
Tom Daly	1	1	0	.000	0	0
Tommy Clarke	1	0	0	----	0	0

=== Pitching ===
==== Starting pitchers ====
Note: G = Games pitched; IP = Innings pitched; W = Wins; L = Losses; ERA = Earned run average; SO = Strikeouts

Player	G	IP	W	L	ERA	SO
Hippo Vaughn	35	290.1	22	10	1.74	148
Lefty Tyler	33	269.1	19	8	2.00	102
Claude Hendrix	32	233.0	20	7	2.78	86
Phil Douglas	25	156.2	10	9	2.13	51

==== Other pitchers ====
Note: G = Games pitched; IP = Innings pitched; W = Wins; L = Losses; ERA = Earned run average; SO = Strikeouts

Player	G	IP	W	L	ERA	SO
Speed Martin	9	53.2	5	2	1.84	16
Pete Alexander	3	26.0	2	1	1.73	15
Vic Aldridge	3	12.1	0	1	1.46	10
Buddy Napier	1	6.2	0	0	5.40	2

==== Relief pitchers ====
Note: G = Games pitched; W = Wins; L = Losses; SV = Saves; ERA = Earned run average; SO = Strikeouts

Player	G	W	L	SV	ERA	SO
Paul Carter	21	3	2	2	2.71	13
Roy Walker	13	1	3	1	2.70	20
Harry Weaver	8	2	2	1	2.20	9

== 1918 World Series ==
AL Boston Red Sox (4) vs. NL Chicago Cubs (2)

Game	Score	Date	Location	Attendance
1	Red Sox – 1, Cubs – 0	September 5	Comiskey Park	19,274
2	Red Sox – 1, Cubs – 3	September 6	Comiskey Park	20,040
3	Red Sox – 2, Cubs – 1	September 7	Comiskey Park	27,054
4	Cubs – 2, Red Sox – 3	September 9	Fenway Park	22,183
5	Cubs – 3, Red Sox – 0	September 10	Fenway Park	24,694
6	Cubs – 1, Red Sox – 2	September 11	Fenway Park	15,238
