= 1918 Pittsburgh Pirates season =

1918 Pittsburgh Pirates
- League: National League
- Ballpark: Forbes Field
- City: Pittsburgh, Pennsylvania
- Owners: Barney Dreyfuss
- Managers: Hugo Bezdek

The 1918 Pittsburgh Pirates season was the 37th season of the Pittsburgh Pirates franchise; the 32nd in the National League. The Pirates finished fourth in the league standings with a record of 65–60.

== Regular season ==
=== Season standings ===
National League
Team	W	L	Pct.	GB	Home	Road
Chicago Cubs	84	45	.651	—	49‍–‍25	35‍–‍20
New York Giants	71	53	.573	10½	35‍–‍21	36‍–‍32
Cincinnati Reds	68	60	.531	15½	46‍–‍24	22‍–‍36
Pittsburgh Pirates	65	60	.520	17	42‍–‍28	23‍–‍32
Brooklyn Robins	57	69	.452	25½	33‍–‍21	24‍–‍48
Philadelphia Phillies	55	68	.447	26	27‍–‍29	28‍–‍39
Boston Braves	53	71	.427	28½	23‍–‍29	30‍–‍42
St. Louis Cardinals	51	78	.395	33	32‍–‍40	19‍–‍38

=== Record vs. opponents ===
1918 National League record Sources:
Team	BSN	BRO	CHC	CIN	NYG	PHI	PIT	STL
Boston	—	8–6	5–14	10–8	1–15	7–12	10–9	12–7
Brooklyn	6–8	—	10–9	6–12	8–12	9–8	10–9	8–11
Chicago	14–5	9–10	—	10–7–1	14–6	12–6	10–8–1	15–3
Cincinnati	8–10	12–6	7–10–1	—	12–7	12–7	4–12	13–8
New York	15–1	12–8	6–14	7–12	—	10–3	8–11	13–4
Philadelphia	12–7	8–9	6–12	7–12	3–10	—	11–7	8–11–2
Pittsburgh	9–10	9–10	8–10–1	12–4	11–8	7–11	—	9–7
St. Louis	7–12	11–8	3–15	8–13	4–13	11–8–2	7–9	—

=== Game log ===
1918 Game Log: 65–60 (Home: 42–28; Away: 23–32)
April: 4–4 (Home: 2–1; Away: 2–3)

#	Date	Opponent	Score	Win	Loss	Save	Attendance	Record
1	April 16	@ Reds	0–2	Schneider	**Cooper** (0–1)	—	—	0–1
2	April 17	@ Reds	8–1	**Hamilton** (1–0)	Regan	—	—	1–1
3	April 18	@ Reds	6–7	Conley	**Harmon** (0–1)	—	—	1–2
4	April 22	@ Cardinals	5–1	**Hamilton** (2–0)	Packard	—	—	2–2
5	April 23	@ Cardinals	5–6	May	**Sanders** (0–1)	—	—	2–3
6	April 25	Reds	1–0	**Miller** (1–0)	Schneider	—	—	3–3
7	April 26	Reds	7–1	**Hamilton** (3–0)	Eller	—	—	4–3
8	April 27	Reds	2–4	Bressler	**Sanders** (0–2)	—	—	4–4

May: 13–13 (Home: 12–11; Away: 1–2)

#	Date	Opponent	Score	Win	Loss	Save	Attendance	Record
9	May 1	@ Cubs	3–5	Vaughn	**Carlson** (0–1)	—	—	4–5
10	May 2	Cardinals	1–0	**Hamilton** (4–0)	Ames	—	—	5–5
11	May 3	Cardinals	2–6	Doak	**Miller** (1–1)	—	—	5–6
12	May 4	Cardinals	5–4 (10)	**Cooper** (1–1)	Sherdel	—	—	6–6
13	May 5	@ Reds	1–3	Toney	**Jacobs** (0–1)	—	—	6–7
14	May 5	@ Reds	4–3	**Harmon** (1–1)	Schneider	**Steele** (1)	—	7–7
15	May 6	Cubs	7–2	**Hamilton** (5–0)	Hendrix	—	—	8–7
16	May 7	Cubs	2–1	**Miller** (2–1)	Weaver	—	—	9–7
17	May 8	Cubs	1–8	Tyler	**Cooper** (1–2)	—	—	9–8
18	May 9	Cubs	2–6	Vaughn	**Sanders** (0–3)	—	—	9–9
19	May 10	Giants	4–2	**Hamilton** (6–0)	Benton	—	—	10–9
20	May 11	Giants	2–0	**Cooper** (2–2)	Sallee	—	13,000	11–9
21	May 14	Giants	2–3	Barnes	**Miller** (2–2)	—	—	11–10
22	May 15	Robins	1–5	Marquard	**Cooper** (2–3)	—	—	11–11
23	May 16	Robins	4–3	**Sanders** (1–3)	Coombs	—	—	12–11
24	May 17	Robins	4–7	Cheney	**Harmon** (1–2)	—	—	12–12
25	May 18	Robins	11–4	**Miller** (3–2)	Griner	—	4,000	13–12
26	May 20	Phillies	5–1	**Cooper** (3–3)	Prendergast	—	—	14–12
27	May 22	Phillies	6–5 (12)	**Cooper** (4–3)	Oeschger	—	—	15–12
28	May 23	Phillies	2–3	Mayer	**Miller** (3–3)	—	—	15–13
29	May 24	Braves	3–6	Ragan	**Steele** (0–1)	—	—	15–14
30	May 27	Braves	1–2	Nehf	**Cooper** (4–4)	—	—	15–15
31	May 28	Braves	2–6	Hearn	**Sanders** (1–4)	—	—	15–16
32	May 30	Cardinals	8–0	**Miller** (4–3)	Packard	—	—	16–16
33	May 30	Cardinals	0–4	Doak	**Harmon** (1–3)	—	—	16–17
34	May 31	Cardinals	12–7	**Steele** (1–1)	Horstmann	**Sanders** (1)	—	17–17

June: 11–17 (Home: 2–2; Away: 9–15)

#	Date	Opponent	Score	Win	Loss	Save	Attendance	Record
35	June 1	@ Giants	0–2	Perritt	**Cooper** (4–5)	—	—	17–18
36	June 3	@ Giants	3–2	**Miller** (5–3)	Tesreau	—	—	18–18
37	June 4	@ Giants	1–2	Sallee	**Harmon** (1–4)	—	—	18–19
38	June 5	@ Giants	3–4	Causey	**Cooper** (4–6)	—	—	18–20
39	June 6	@ Robins	0–1	Marquard	**Sanders** (1–5)	—	—	18–21
40	June 8	@ Robins	7–1	**Miller** (6–3)	Cheney	—	—	19–21
41	June 8	@ Robins	1–2 (12)	Coombs	**Sanders** (1–6)	—	—	19–22
42	June 10	@ Robins	0–2	Grimes	**Cooper** (4–7)	—	—	19–23
43	June 11	@ Braves	3–2 (16)	**Sanders** (2–6)	Hearn	—	—	20–23
44	June 12	@ Braves	0–1	Fillingim	**Miller** (6–4)	—	—	20–24
45	June 13	@ Braves	1–2	Nehf	**Harmon** (1–5)	—	—	20–25
46	June 14	@ Braves	6–7	Rudolph	**Cooper** (4–8)	—	—	20–26
47	June 15	@ Phillies	1–6	Oeschger	**Sanders** (2–7)	—	—	20–27
48	June 17	@ Phillies	8–9 (10)	Watson	**Steele** (1–2)	—	—	20–28
49	June 18	@ Phillies	0–1	Hogg	**Cooper** (4–9)	—	—	20–29
50	June 19	Cubs	0–1	Douglas	**Harmon** (1–6)	—	—	20–30
51	June 20	Cubs	3–1	**Sanders** (3–7)	Hendrix	**Cooper** (1)	—	21–30
52	June 21	Cubs	3–0	**Steele** (2–2)	Tyler	—	—	22–30
53	June 22	Cubs	2–5	Vaughn	**Cooper** (4–10)	—	—	22–31
54	June 23	@ Reds	4–1	**Mayer** (1–0)	Toney	—	—	23–31
55	June 23	@ Reds	15–1	**Harmon** (2–6)	Toney	—	—	24–31
56	June 24	@ Reds	7–2	**Miller** (7–4)	Schneider	—	—	25–31
57	June 27	@ Cardinals	4–3	**Cooper** (5–10)	Doak	—	—	26–31
58	June 28	@ Cardinals	1–8	Meadows	**Harmon** (2–7)	—	—	26–32
59	June 29	@ Cardinals	5–1	**Mayer** (2–0)	Johnson	—	—	27–32
60	June 29	@ Cardinals	4–5	Sherdel	**Miller** (7–5)	—	—	27–33
61	June 30	@ Cardinals	1–2	Ames	**Steele** (2–3)	—	—	27–34
62	June 30	@ Cardinals	5–4 (11)	**Cooper** (6–10)	Doak	—	—	28–34

July: 20–9 (Home: 16–5; Away: 4–4)

#	Date	Opponent	Score	Win	Loss	Save	Attendance	Record
63	July 2	Reds	7–6 (10)	**Cooper** (7–10)	Regan	—	—	29–34
64	July 3	Reds	8–5	**Comstock** (1–0)	Schneider	**Cooper** (2)	—	30–34
65	July 4	Reds	1–0 (11)	**Sanders** (4–7)	Ring	—	—	31–34
66	July 4	Reds	8–4	**Cooper** (8–10)	Eller	—	—	32–34
67	July 5	Giants	10–4	**Slapnicka** (1–0)	Schupp	—	—	33–34
68	July 6	Braves	17–1	**Mayer** (3–0)	Rudolph	—	—	34–34
69	July 6	Braves	5–4	**Sanders** (5–7)	Fillingim	**Comstock** (1)	—	35–34
70	July 8	Braves	0–5	Ragan	**Comstock** (1–1)	—	—	35–35
71	July 9	Braves	7–2	**Cooper** (9–10)	Fillingim	—	—	36–35
72	July 10	Giants	4–9	Demaree	**Slapnicka** (1–1)	—	—	36–36
73	July 11	Giants	5–4	**Mayer** (4–0)	Smith	—	—	37–36
74	July 13	Giants	5–4	**Cooper** (10–10)	Perritt	—	—	38–36
75	July 13	Giants	1–8	Causey	**Sanders** (5–8)	—	—	38–37
76	July 15	Robins	6–5	**Mayer** (5–0)	Marquard	—	—	39–37
77	July 16	Robins	7–6	**Cooper** (11–10)	Grimes	—	—	40–37
78	July 17	Robins	5–4 (11)	**Cooper** (12–10)	Robertson	—	—	41–37
79	July 18	Phillies	0–1 (13)	Jacobs	**Slapnicka** (1–2)	—	—	41–38
80	July 19	Phillies	3–2	**Comstock** (2–1)	Oeschger	—	—	42–38
81	July 20	Phillies	1–0	**Mayer** (6–0)	Hogg	—	—	43–38
82	July 20	Phillies	2–3	Prendergast	**Cooper** (12–11)	—	—	43–39
83	July 22	Braves	7–2	**Sanders** (6–8)	Nehf	**Cooper** (3)	—	44–39
84	July 24	@ Robins	3–1	**Comstock** (3–1)	Marquard	—	—	45–39
85	July 25	@ Robins	0–10	Grimes	**Slapnicka** (1–3)	—	—	45–40
86	July 25	@ Robins	2–6	Coombs	**Cooper** (12–12)	—	—	45–41
87	July 26	@ Robins	3–4	Cheney	**Sanders** (6–9)	—	—	45–42
88	July 27	@ Giants	8–4	**Miller** (8–5)	Demaree	**Comstock** (2)	—	46–42
89	July 29	@ Giants	4–2	**Cooper** (13–12)	Perritt	—	—	47–42
90	July 31	@ Giants	0–1	Causey	**Comstock** (3–2)	—	—	47–43
91	July 31	@ Giants	4–2	**Adams** (1–0)	Steele	—	—	48–43

August: 16–15 (Home: 9–8; Away: 7–7)

#	Date	Opponent	Score	Win	Loss	Save	Attendance	Record
92	August 1	@ Braves	2–0 (21)	**Cooper** (14–12)	Nehf	—	—	49–43
93	August 2	@ Braves	2–4	Northrop	**Miller** (8–6)	—	2,500	49–44
94	August 3	@ Braves	4–3	**Comstock** (4–2)	George	—	—	50–44
95	August 5	@ Braves	0–1	Rudolph	**Adams** (1–1)	—	—	50–45
96	August 6	@ Phillies	10–2	**Cooper** (15–12)	Prendergast	—	—	51–45
97	August 7	@ Phillies	4–2	**Mayer** (7–0)	Watson	—	1,000	52–45
98	August 8	@ Phillies	1–6	Hogg	**Comstock** (4–3)	—	—	52–46
99	August 8	@ Phillies	2–8	Jacobs	**Slapnicka** (1–4)	—	—	52–47
100	August 9	Reds	4–3	**Hill** (1–0)	Schneider	—	—	53–47
101	August 10	Cubs	3–3 (10)			—	10,000	53–47
102	August 11	@ Cubs	3–5	Douglas	**Comstock** (4–4)	—	—	53–48
103	August 11	@ Cubs	6–3	**Mayer** (8–0)	Vaughn	—	—	54–48
104	August 12	@ Cubs	12–1	**Hill** (2–0)	Martin	—	—	55–48
105	August 13	@ Cubs	1–2	Tyler	**Cooper** (15–13)	—	—	55–49
106	August 13	@ Cubs	7–2	**Miller** (9–6)	Douglas	—	—	56–49
107	August 14	@ Cubs	0–2	Vaughn	**Comstock** (4–5)	—	2,000	56–50
108	August 15	Robins	3–1	**Cooper** (16–13)	Smith	—	—	57–50
109	August 16	Robins	1–5	Cheney	**Mayer** (8–1)	—	—	57–51
110	August 17	Robins	0–2	Grimes	**Hill** (2–1)	—	8,000	57–52
111	August 17	Robins	2–1	**Miller** (10–6)	Robertson	—	8,000	58–52
112	August 19	Giants	8–1	**Comstock** (5–5)	Causey	—	—	59–52
113	August 19	Giants	1–2	Toney	**Cooper** (16–14)	—	—	59–53
114	August 20	Giants	10–2	**Mayer** (9–1)	Steele	—	—	60–53
115	August 21	Braves	3–2	**Miller** (11–6)	Nehf	—	—	61–53
116	August 22	Braves	3–0	**Sanders** (7–9)	Rudolph	—	—	62–53
117	August 23	Braves	0–5	Northrop	**Hill** (2–2)	—	—	62–54
118	August 24	Phillies	4–3	**Cooper** (17–14)	Jacobs	—	—	63–54
119	August 24	Phillies	4–7	Hogg	**Mayer** (9–2)	—	—	63–55
120	August 27	Phillies	6–7	Prendergast	**Comstock** (5–6)	Hogg	—	63–56
121	August 27	Phillies	2–8	Watson	**Miller** (11–7)	—	—	63–57
122	August 29	Cardinals	1–0	**Cooper** (18–14)	Doak	—	—	64–57
123	August 29	Cardinals	1–4	Sherdel	**Mayer** (9–3)	—	—	64–58

September: 1–2 (Home: 1–1; Away: 0–1)

#	Date	Opponent	Score	Win	Loss	Save	Attendance	Record
124	September 1	@ Cubs	0–4	Tyler	**Hill** (2–3)	—	—	64–59
125	September 2	Cubs	3–4	Martin	**Miller** (11–8)	—	4,000	64–60
126	September 2	Cubs	3–2	**Cooper** (19–14)	Hendrix	—	9,000	65–60

Legend: = Win = Loss = Tie
Bold = Pirates team member

=== Roster ===
1918 Pittsburgh Pirates
**Roster**
**Pitchers**: Babe Adams; Hal Carlson; Ralph Comstock; Wilbur Cooper; Earl Hamilton; Bob Harmon; Carmen Hill; Elmer Jacobs; Erskine Mayer; Frank Miller; Roy Sanders; Cy Slapnicka; Bob Steele	**Catchers**: Jimmy Archer; Fred Blackwell; Walter Schmidt; Red Smith; **Infielders**: Lute Boone; Howdy Caton; George Cutshaw; Roy Ellam; Gus Getz; Bill McKechnie; Fritz Mollwitz; Jake Pitler; Ben Shaw	**Outfielders**: Carson Bigbee; Max Carey; Bill Hinchman; Lee King; Tommy Leach; Billy Southworth; Casey Stengel	**Manager**: Hugo Bezdek

== Player stats ==
=== Batting ===
==== Starters by position ====
Note: Pos = Position; G = Games played; AB = At bats; H = Hits; Avg. = Batting average; HR = Home runs; RBI = Runs batted in

Pos	Player	G	AB	H	Avg.	HR	RBI
C	Walter Schmidt	105	323	77	.238	0	27
1B	Fritz Mollwitz	119	432	116	.269	0	45
2B	George Cutshaw	126	463	132	.285	5	68
SS	Howdy Caton	80	303	71	.234	0	17
3B	Bill McKechnie	126	435	111	.255	2	43
OF	Billy Southworth	64	246	84	.341	2	43
OF	Carson Bigbee	92	310	79	.255	1	19
OF	Max Carey	126	468	128	.274	3	48

==== Other batters ====
Note: G = Games played; AB = At bats; H = Hits; Avg. = Batting average; HR = Home runs; RBI = Runs batted in

Player	G	AB	H	Avg.	HR	RBI
Casey Stengel	39	122	30	.246	1	12
Lee King	36	112	26	.232	1	11
Bill Hinchman	50	111	26	.234	0	13
Luke Boone	27	91	18	.198	0	3
Roy Ellam	26	77	10	.130	0	2
Tommy Leach	30	72	14	.194	0	5
Jimmy Archer	24	58	9	.155	0	3
Ben Shaw	21	36	7	.194	0	2
Red Smith	15	24	4	.167	0	3
Fred Blackwell	8	13	2	.154	0	4
Gus Getz	7	10	2	.200	0	0
Jake Pitler	2	1	0	.000	0	0

=== Pitching ===
==== Starting pitchers ====
Note: G = Games pitched; IP = Innings pitched; W = Wins; L = Losses; ERA = Earned run average; SO = Strikeouts

Player	G	IP	W	L	ERA	SO
Wilbur Cooper	38	273.1	19	14	2.11	117
Frank Miller	23	170.1	11	8	2.38	47
Erskine Mayer	15	123.1	9	3	2.26	25
Earl Hamilton	6	54.0	6	0	0.83	20
Cy Slapnicka	7	49.1	1	4	4.74	3
Babe Adams	3	22.2	1	1	1.19	6

==== Other pitchers ====
Note: G = Games pitched; IP = Innings pitched; W = Wins; L = Losses; ERA = Earned run average; SO = Strikeouts

Player	G	IP	W	L	ERA	SO
Roy Sanders	28	156.0	7	9	2.60	55
Bob Harmon	16	82.1	2	7	2.62	7
Ralph Comstock	15	81.0	5	6	3.00	44
Bob Steele	10	49.0	2	3	3.31	21
Carmen Hill	6	43.2	2	3	1.24	15
Elmer Jacobs	8	23.1	0	1	5.79	2
Hal Carlson	3	12.0	0	1	3.75	5
