= 1918 New York Giants season =

1918 New York Giants
- League: National League
- Ballpark: Polo Grounds
- City: New York City
- Record: 71–53 (.573)
- League place: 2nd
- Owners: Harry Hempstead
- Managers: John McGraw

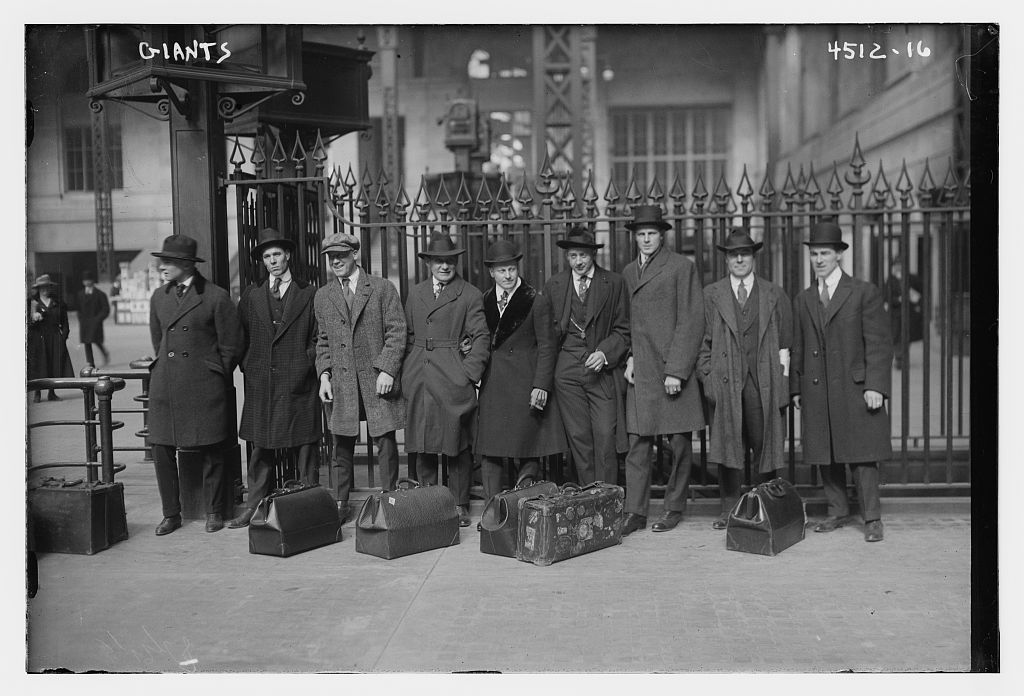
1918 New York Giants

The 1918 New York Giants season was the franchise's 36th season. The team finished in second place in the National League with a 71–53 record, 10½ games behind the Chicago Cubs.

== Regular season ==
=== Season standings ===
National League
Team	W	L	Pct.	GB	Home	Road
Chicago Cubs	84	45	.651	—	49‍–‍25	35‍–‍20
New York Giants	71	53	.573	10½	35‍–‍21	36‍–‍32
Cincinnati Reds	68	60	.531	15½	46‍–‍24	22‍–‍36
Pittsburgh Pirates	65	60	.520	17	42‍–‍28	23‍–‍32
Brooklyn Robins	57	69	.452	25½	33‍–‍21	24‍–‍48
Philadelphia Phillies	55	68	.447	26	27‍–‍29	28‍–‍39
Boston Braves	53	71	.427	28½	23‍–‍29	30‍–‍42
St. Louis Cardinals	51	78	.395	33	32‍–‍40	19‍–‍38

=== Record vs. opponents ===
1918 National League record Sources:
Team	BSN	BRO	CHC	CIN	NYG	PHI	PIT	STL
Boston	—	8–6	5–14	10–8	1–15	7–12	10–9	12–7
Brooklyn	6–8	—	10–9	6–12	8–12	9–8	10–9	8–11
Chicago	14–5	9–10	—	10–7–1	14–6	12–6	10–8–1	15–3
Cincinnati	8–10	12–6	7–10–1	—	12–7	12–7	4–12	13–8
New York	15–1	12–8	6–14	7–12	—	10–3	8–11	13–4
Philadelphia	12–7	8–9	6–12	7–12	3–10	—	11–7	8–11–2
Pittsburgh	9–10	9–10	8–10–1	12–4	11–8	7–11	—	9–7
St. Louis	7–12	11–8	3–15	8–13	4–13	11–8–2	7–9	—

=== Roster ===
1918 New York Giants
Roster
Pitchers: Fred Anderson; Jesse Barnes; Rube Benton; Red Causey; Al Demaree; Waite Hoyt; Jack Ogden; Pol Perritt; George Ross; Slim Sallee; Ferdie Schupp; George Smith; Bob Steele; Jeff Tesreau; Fred Toney	Catchers: George Gibson; Lew McCarty; Bill Rariden; Infielders: Larry Doyle; Art Fletcher; Walter Holke; Jay Kirke; Bert Niehoff; José Rodríguez; Ed Sicking; Heinie Zimmerman	Outfielders: George Burns; Pete Compton; Benny Kauff; Jim Thorpe; Joe Wilhoit; Ross Youngs	Manager: John McGraw

== Player stats ==
=== Batting ===
==== Starters by position ====
Note: Pos = Position; G = Games played; AB = At bats; H = Hits; Avg. = Batting average; HR = Home runs; RBI = Runs batted in

Pos	Player	G	AB	H	Avg.	HR	RBI
C	Lew McCarty	86	257	69	.268	0	24
1B	Walter Holke	88	326	82	.252	1	27
2B	Larry Doyle	75	257	67	.261	3	36
SS	Art Fletcher	124	468	123	.263	0	47
3B	Heinie Zimmerman	121	463	126	.272	1	56
OF	George Burns	119	465	135	.290	4	51
OF	Ross Youngs	121	474	143	.302	1	25
OF	Benny Kauff	67	270	85	.315	2	39

==== Other batters ====
Note: G = Games played; AB = At bats; H = Hits; Avg. = Batting average; HR = Home runs; RBI = Runs batted in

Player	G	AB	H	Avg.	HR	RBI
Bill Rariden	69	183	41	.224	0	17
Joe Wilhoit	64	135	37	.274	0	15
Ed Sicking	46	132	33	.250	0	12
José Rodríguez	50	125	20	.160	0	15
Jim Thorpe	58	113	28	.248	1	11
Pete Compton	21	60	13	.217	0	5
Jay Kirke	17	56	14	.250	0	3
Bert Niehoff	7	23	6	.261	0	1
George Gibson	4	2	1	.500	0	0

=== Pitching ===
==== Starting pitchers ====
Note: G = Games pitched; IP = Innings pitched; W = Wins; L = Losses; ERA = Earned run average; SO = Strikeouts

Player	G	IP	W	L	ERA	SO
Pol Perritt	35	233.0	18	13	2.74	60
Slim Sallee	18	132.0	8	8	2.25	33
Fred Toney	11	85.1	6	2	1.69	19
Jeff Tesreau	12	73.2	4	4	2.32	31
Jesse Barnes	9	54.2	6	1	1.81	12
Rube Benton	3	24.0	1	2	1.88	9

==== Other pitchers ====
Note: G = Games pitched; IP = Innings pitched; W = Wins; L = Losses; ERA = Earned run average; SO = Strikeouts

Player	G	IP	W	L	ERA	SO
Red Causey	29	158.1	11	6	2.79	48
Al Demaree	26	142.0	8	6	2.47	39
Fred Anderson	18	70.2	4	2	2.67	24
Bob Steele	12	66.0	3	5	2.59	24
Ferdie Schupp	10	33.1	0	1	7.56	22
George Smith	5	26.2	2	3	4.05	4

==== Relief pitchers ====
Note: G = Games pitched; W = Wins; L = Losses; SV = Saves; ERA = Earned run average; SO = Strikeouts

Player	G	W	L	SV	ERA	SO
Jack Ogden	5	0	0	0	3.12	1
George Ross	1	0	0	1	0.00	2
Waite Hoyt	1	0	0	0	0.00	2
