= 1918 Cincinnati Reds season =

1918 Cincinnati Reds
- League: National League
- Ballpark: Redland Field
- City: Cincinnati, Ohio
- Owners: Garry Herrmann
- Managers: Christy Mathewson

The 1918 Cincinnati Reds season was a season in American baseball. The team finished third in the National League with a record of 68–60, 15½ games behind the Chicago Cubs.

== Off-season ==
In March, the Reds sold third baseman Bill McKechnie to the Pittsburgh Pirates for $20,000. McKechnie had previously played for the Pirates from 1907 to 1912. A natural third baseman, he appeared in only four games at third for the Reds in 1917, as he played most of his games at second base.

On March 18, Cincinnati was part of a three way deal with the St. Louis Browns and New York Yankees. In the deal, the Reds received Lee Magee from the Browns. Magee would become the Reds starting second baseman, and split the 1917 season with the Browns and Yankees. In 87 games between the two clubs, Magee hit .200 with no home runs and 12 RBI. The Reds sent catcher Tommy Clarke to New York to complete the deal.

A couple of weeks later, on April 1, the Reds sent second baseman Dave Shean to the Boston Red Sox for pitcher Rube Foster. Foster refused to report in Cincinnati and the Red Sox sent the Reds cash to complete the trade.

== Regular season ==
Midway through the season, Reds first baseman Hal Chase allegedly paid pitcher Jimmy Ring $50 to throw a game against the New York Giants. Manager Christy Mathewson got wind of it and suspended Chase for the remainder of the season, and brought formal charges against Chase for fixing games, but National League president John Heydler acquitted him. Heydler had told sportswriter Fred Lieb in private that he believed Chase had bet on baseball, but did not have enough evidence to convict him.

On July 15, the Reds sold pitcher Fred Toney to the New York Giants. Toney, who had pitched with the club since 1915, was only 6-10 with a 2.90 ERA and had lost his spot in the Reds starting rotation due to the emergence of Jimmy Ring and Hod Eller.

Late in the season, with only 10 games remaining, manager Christy Mathewson left the Reds to enlist in the United States Army for World War I. He served overseas in the newly formed Chemical Service with Ty Cobb. Third baseman Heinie Groh took over as manager for the remainder of the season.

=== Season summary ===
After a good 1917 season in which the team finished over .500 for the first time since 1909, the Reds hoped to build off of that success in 1918. Over the first 35 games of the season, Cincinnati had a very respectable 20-15 record, and was in third place in the National League, five games behind the first place New York Giants. The Reds then struggled badly over the next 29 games, winning only five of them to drop completely out of the pennant race. Only July 4, the Reds had a 25-39 record, and sat in seventh place, 21 games out of first.

The team would play very good baseball over the final months and turned their season around. Over their final 64 games, the Reds had a 43-21 record, and finished the season, which was cut short due to World War I, with a 68-60 record, which put them in third place, 15.5 games behind the pennant winning Chicago Cubs. The Reds .531 winning percentage was their highest since 1904.

Outfielder Edd Roush had another superb season, as he led the club with a .333 batting average, five home runs, 62 RBI and 24 stolen bases in 113 games. Third baseman Heinie Groh batted .320 with one home run and 37 RBI. First baseman Hal Chase batted .301 with two home runs and 38 RBI in 74 games before being suspended for the season by manager Christy Mathewson. Outfielder Sherry Magee took over at first base for Chase, and he led the club with 76 RBI, while batting .298 with two home runs in 115 games.

Pitcher Hod Eller led the Reds pitching staff with a 16-12 record, 2.36 ERA and led the team in innings pitched with 217.2 Pete Schneider struggled with a 10-15 record and a 3.53 ERA, however, he led the Reds with 17 complete games. Jimmy Ring had a solid season, going 9-5 with a 2.85 ERA in 21 games, while Rube Bressler went 8-5 with a 2.46 ERA in 17 games.

=== Season standings ===
National League
Team	W	L	Pct.	GB	Home	Road
Chicago Cubs	84	45	.651	—	49‍–‍25	35‍–‍20
New York Giants	71	53	.573	10½	35‍–‍21	36‍–‍32
Cincinnati Reds	68	60	.531	15½	46‍–‍24	22‍–‍36
Pittsburgh Pirates	65	60	.520	17	42‍–‍28	23‍–‍32
Brooklyn Robins	57	69	.452	25½	33‍–‍21	24‍–‍48
Philadelphia Phillies	55	68	.447	26	27‍–‍29	28‍–‍39
Boston Braves	53	71	.427	28½	23‍–‍29	30‍–‍42
St. Louis Cardinals	51	78	.395	33	32‍–‍40	19‍–‍38

=== Record vs. opponents ===
1918 National League record Sources:
Team	BSN	BRO	CHC	CIN	NYG	PHI	PIT	STL
Boston	—	8–6	5–14	10–8	1–15	7–12	10–9	12–7
Brooklyn	6–8	—	10–9	6–12	8–12	9–8	10–9	8–11
Chicago	14–5	9–10	—	10–7–1	14–6	12–6	10–8–1	15–3
Cincinnati	8–10	12–6	7–10–1	—	12–7	12–7	4–12	13–8
New York	15–1	12–8	6–14	7–12	—	10–3	8–11	13–4
Philadelphia	12–7	8–9	6–12	7–12	3–10	—	11–7	8–11–2
Pittsburgh	9–10	9–10	8–10–1	12–4	11–8	7–11	—	9–7
St. Louis	7–12	11–8	3–15	8–13	4–13	11–8–2	7–9	—

=== Roster ===
1918 Cincinnati Reds
Roster
Pitchers: Rube Bressler; Snipe Conley; Hod Eller; Jesse Haines; Larry Jacobus; Dolf Luque; Roy Mitchell; Mike Regan; Jimmy Ring; Dutch Ruether; Pete Schneider; George Smith; Fred Toney	Catchers: Nick Allen; Jimmy Archer; Harry Smith; Ivey Wingo; Infielders: Lena Blackburne; Hal Chase; Heinie Groh; Lee Magee; Sherry Magee	Outfielders: Manuel Cueto; Tommy Griffith; Greasy Neale; Edd Roush	Manager: Christy Mathewson

== Player stats ==
=== Batting ===
==== Starters by position ====
Note: Pos = Position; G = Games played; AB = At bats; H = Hits; Avg. = Batting average; HR = Home runs; RBI = Runs batted in

Pos	Player	G	AB	H	Avg.	HR	RBI
C	Ivey Wingo	100	323	82	.254	0	31
1B	Hal Chase	74	259	78	.301	2	38
2B	Lee Magee	119	459	133	.290	0	28
SS	Lena Blackburne	125	435	99	.228	1	45
3B	Heinie Groh	126	493	158	.320	1	37
OF	Edd Roush	113	435	145	.333	5	62
OF	Greasy Neale	107	371	100	.270	1	32
OF	Tommy Griffith	118	427	113	.265	2	48

==== Other batters ====
Note: G = Games played; AB = At bats; H = Hits; Avg. = Batting average; HR = Home runs; RBI = Runs batted in

Player	G	AB	H	Avg.	HR	RBI
Sherry Magee	115	400	119	.298	2	76
Manuel Cueto	47	108	32	.296	0	14
Nick Allen	37	96	25	.260	0	5
Harry Smith	13	27	5	.185	0	4
Jimmy Archer	9	26	7	.269	0	2

=== Pitching ===
==== Starting pitchers ====
Note: G = Games pitched; IP = Innings pitched; W = Wins; L = Losses; ERA = Earned run average; SO = Strikeouts

Player	G	IP	W	L	ERA	SO
Pete Schneider	33	217.0	10	15	3.53	51
Jimmy Ring	21	142.1	9	5	2.85	26
Fred Toney	21	136.2	6	10	2.90	32
Rube Bressler	17	128.0	8	5	2.46	37
Dolf Luque	12	83.0	6	3	3.80	26
Dutch Ruether	2	10.0	0	1	2.70	10

==== Other pitchers ====
Note: G = Games pitched; IP = Innings pitched; W = Wins; L = Losses; ERA = Earned run average; SO = Strikeouts

Player	G	IP	W	L	ERA	SO
Hod Eller	37	217.2	16	12	2.36	84
Mike Regan	22	80.0	5	5	3.26	15
George Smith	10	55.1	2	3	4.07	19
Roy Mitchell	5	36.1	4	0	0.74	9

==== Relief pitchers ====
Note: G = Games pitched; W = Wins; L = Losses; SV = Saves; ERA = Earned run average; SO = Strikeouts

Player	G	W	L	SV	ERA	SO
Larry Jacobus	5	0	1	0	5.71	8
Snipe Conley	5	2	0	1	5.27	2
Jesse Haines	1	0	0	0	1.80	2
