= Roy Massey =

Roy Massey may refer to:

- Roy Massey (footballer) (born 1943), English football player and coach
- Roy Massey (organist) (born 1934), British organist and conductor
- Red Massey (Roy Hardee Massey, 1890–1954), Major League Baseball player
