= Johnny Beall =

American baseball player (1882–1926)

- Outfielder
- Born: March 12, 1882; Beltsville, Maryland, U.S.
- Died: June 14, 1926 (aged 44); Beltsville, Maryland, U.S.
- Batted: Left Threw: Right

MLB debut
- April 17, 1913, for the Cleveland Naps

Last MLB appearance
- July 16, 1918, for the St. Louis Cardinals

MLB statistics
- Batting average: .253
- Home runs: 3
- Runs batted in: 17
- Stats at Baseball Reference

Teams
- Cleveland Naps (1913); Chicago White Sox (1913); Cincinnati Reds (1915–1916); St. Louis Cardinals (1918)

John Woolf Beall (March 12, 1882 – June 14, 1926) was an American outfielder in Major League Baseball who played for the Cleveland Naps, Chicago White Sox, Cincinnati Reds and St. Louis Cardinals.

== Career ==
Beall was born in Beltsville, Maryland. On September 16, 1912, he was drafted by the Cleveland Naps in the Denver (Western) rule 5 draft. He signed to play in the Naps organization.

He made his major league debut on April 17, 1913 with the Naps at age 31. On May 29, he was traded to Milwaukee (American Association) to complete an earlier trade. However, in June 1913 the trade was voided, and Beall returned to the Naps. On June 6, he was claimed off waivers by the Chicago White Sox. After only about one month with Chicago, he was traded back to Milwaukee. This time, the trade didn't void. In 1913, Beall batted .258 in 66 at bats. He did not play in the major leagues in 1914. On September 15, 1915, Beall was claimed by the Cincinnati Reds in the rule 5 draft. In 1915, he hit .235 in 34 at-bats; in 1916, he hit .333 in 21 at-bats and on April 20 he hit the first ever home run at Wrigley Field. In April of that year, the Milwaukee team purchased Beall from the Reds. He did not play in the major leagues in 1917. It is unknown how Beall got to the Cardinals, but in 1918 he hit .224 in 49 at-bats in St. Louis. His final major league game was on July 16 of that year.

At the time of his retirement, Beall had a career batting average of .253. He finished with 170 at bats in 58 games. He drove in 17 runs during his career. Beall hit three home runs over the course of his career. His lifetime fielding percentage was .972.

Beall died at age 44 in his hometown of Beltsville.
