= Ollie O'Mara =

American baseball player (1891–1989)

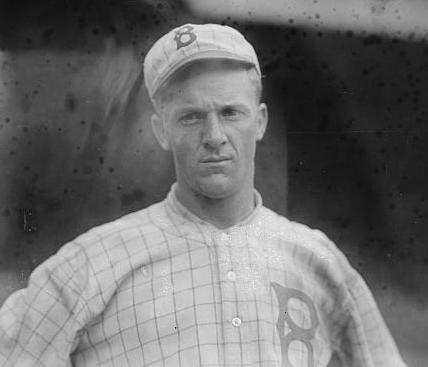
- Shortstop
- Born: March 8, 1891; St. Louis, Missouri, U.S.
- Died: October 24, 1989 (aged 98); Reno, Nevada, U.S.
- Batted: Right Threw: Right

MLB debut
- September 8, 1912, for the Detroit Tigers

Last MLB appearance
- April 19, 1919, for the Brooklyn Robins

MLB statistics
- Batting average: .231
- Home runs: 2
- Runs batted in: 77
- Stats at Baseball Reference

Teams
- Detroit Tigers (1912); Brooklyn Robins (1914–1916, 1918–1919)

Career highlights and awards
- 1916 National League pennant

Oliver Edward O'Mara (March 8, 1891 – October 24, 1989) was an American shortstop in Major League Baseball from 1912 to 1919, primarily with the Brooklyn Robins. He had one at-bat in the 1916 World Series against the Boston Red Sox. He batted right and threw right, was 5 ft 9 in (1.75 m) tall and weighed 155 pounds.

O'Mara threw out the first pitch for the Los Angeles Dodgers on opening day in 1981. At the time of his death, he was the oldest living professional baseball player. He is buried in Kenosha, Wisconsin.
