= Pickles Dillhoefer =

American baseball player (1893–1922)

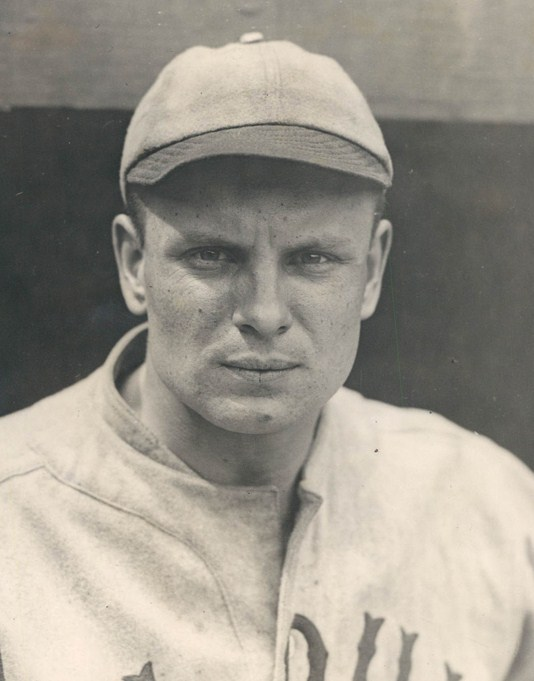
- Catcher
- Born: October 13, 1893; Cleveland, Ohio, U.S.
- Died: February 23, 1922 (aged 28); St. Louis, Missouri, U.S.
- Batted: Right Threw: Right

MLB debut
- April 16, 1917, for the Chicago Cubs

Last MLB appearance
- October 1, 1921, for the St. Louis Cardinals

MLB statistics
- Batting average: .223
- Home run: 0
- Runs batted in: 48
- Stats at Baseball Reference

Teams
- Chicago Cubs (1917); Philadelphia Phillies (1918); St. Louis Cardinals (1919–1921)

William Martin "Pickles" Dillhoefer (October 13, 1893 – February 23, 1922) was an American professional baseball player. He played in Major League Baseball (MLB) as a catcher for parts of the 1917–1921 seasons with the Chicago Cubs, Philadelphia Phillies and St. Louis Cardinals.

== Biography ==
Dillhoefer was famously one-fourth of what is generally considered one of the worst trades in Philadelphia Phillies history: Dillhoefer was sent with Mike Prendergast from the Chicago Cubs to the Phillies in exchange for catcher Bill Killefer and pitcher Grover Cleveland Alexander on December 11, 1917.

Dillhoefer went on to appear in just eight games for the Phillies. He was later traded to the St. Louis Cardinals, where he played regularly for three years. Meanwhile, Alexander went on to win 183 games for the Cubs and Cardinals before ending his career in 1930 with the Phillies, and was later inducted to the National Baseball Hall of Fame.

While his career was undistinguished, Dillhoefer was still young when he died from typhoid fever in the winter of 1921–1922. He is remembered for his colorful nickname, a play on dill pickles.

== See also ==
- List of baseball players who died during their careers
