= Herman Bronkie =

American baseball player (1885–1968)

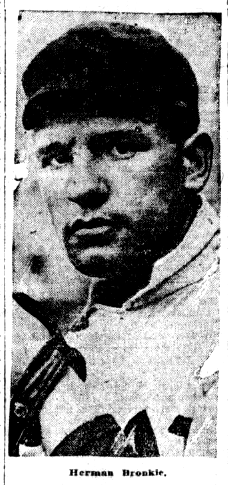
- Bronkie in 1911
- Third baseman
- Born: March 30, 1885; South Manchester, Connecticut, U.S.
- Died: May 27, 1968 (aged 83); Somers, Connecticut, U.S.
- Batted: Right Threw: right

MLB debut
- September 20, 1910, for the Cleveland Naps

Last MLB appearance
- August 15, 1922, for the St. Louis Browns

MLB statistics
- Batting average: .241
- Home runs: 1
- Runs batted in: 24
- Stats at Baseball Reference

Teams
- Cleveland Naps (1910–1912); Chicago Cubs (1914); St. Louis Cardinals (1918); St. Louis Browns (1919, 1922)

Charles Herman Bronkie (March 30, 1885 – May 27, 1968) was an American Major League Baseball third baseman who played for seven seasons. He played for the Cleveland Naps from 1910 to 1912, the Chicago Cubs in 1914, the St. Louis Cardinals in 1918, and the St. Louis Browns in 1919 and 1922. He attended Manchester High School.
