= Rowdy Elliott =

American baseball player (1890–1934)

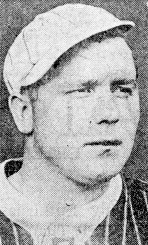
- Catcher
- Born: July 8, 1890; Kokomo, Indiana, U.S.
- Died: February 12, 1934 (aged 43); San Francisco, California, U.S.
- Batted: Right Threw: Right

MLB debut
- September 24, 1910, for the Boston Doves

Last MLB appearance
- October 2, 1920, for the Brooklyn Robins

MLB statistics
- Batting average: .241
- Home runs: 1
- Runs batted in: 44
- Stats at Baseball Reference

Teams
- Boston Doves (1910); Chicago Cubs (1916–1918); Brooklyn Robins (1920)

Harold Bell "Rowdy" Elliott (July 8, 1890 – February 12, 1934) was an American catcher in Major League Baseball who played for the Boston Doves, Chicago Cubs and Brooklyn Robins in parts of five seasons spanning 1910–1920. Listed at 5' 9", 160 lb., Elliott batted and threw right handed. He was born in Kokomo, Indiana.

Elliott spent 23 years in baseball between 1907 and 1929, which included his five in the majors and 20 in the minor leagues, while losing most of 1918 when he joined the United States Navy during World War I.

On February 23, 1920, Elliott married Helena McKerman, a native of North Dakota, in Alameda County, California. He died at the age of 43 at Harbor Hospital in San Francisco, California from injuries received in a fall from an apartment house window. The circumstances of his death are still a mystery.
