= Ben Shaw (athlete) =

American baseball and football player (1893–1959)

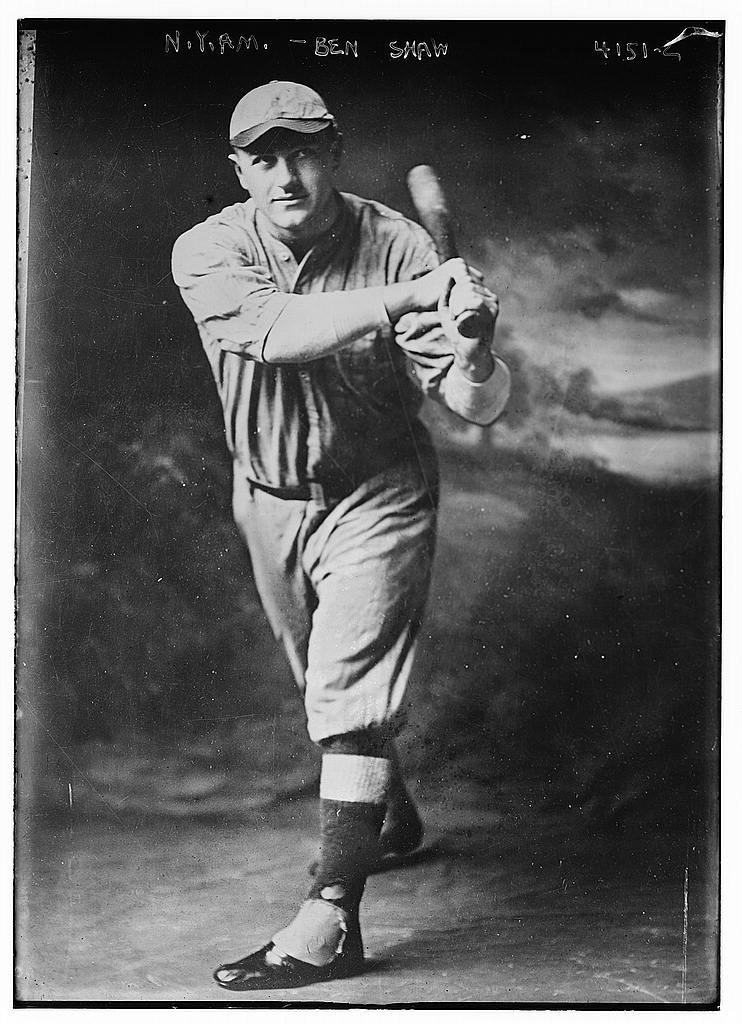
- First baseman / Catcher
- Born: June 18, 1893; LaCenter, Kentucky, U.S.
- Died: March 16, 1959 (aged 65); Cleveland, Ohio, U.S.
- Batted: Right Threw: Right

MLB debut
- April 11, 1917, for the Pittsburgh Pirates

Last MLB appearance
- August 27, 1918, for the Pittsburgh Pirates

MLB statistics
- Batting average: .184
- Hits: 7
- Runs: 5
- Stats at Baseball Reference

Teams
- Pittsburgh Pirates (1917–1918)

Benjamin Nathaniel Shaw (June 18, 1893 – March 16, 1959) was an American professional baseball and football player. Shaw played in the National League with the Pittsburgh Pirates from 1917 to 1918. He also played with the Canton Bulldogs of the National Football League (NFL) in 1923 as an offensive guard, helping the team to the NFL championship. After that season, he joined the Gilberton Cadamounts in the Anthracite League, after Canton failed to issue him a contract for 1924.
