= Jake Northrop =

American baseball player (1888–1945)

- Pitcher
- Born: March 5, 1888; Monroeton, Pennsylvania, U.S.
- Died: November 16, 1945 (aged 57); Monroeton, Pennsylvania, U.S.
- Batted: Left Threw: Right

MLB debut
- July 29, 1918, for the Boston Braves

Last MLB appearance
- June 24, 1919, for the Boston Braves

MLB statistics
- Win–loss record: 6–6
- Earned run average: 2.91
- Strikeouts: 13
- Stats at Baseball Reference

Teams
- Boston Braves (1918–1919)

George Howard "Jake" Northrop (March 5, 1888 – November 16, 1945) nicknamed "Jerky", was an American pitcher in Major League Baseball. He played for the Boston Braves.
