= George Ross (baseball) =

American baseball player (1892-1935)

- Pitcher
- Born: June 27, 1892; San Rafael, California
- Died: April 2, 1935 (aged 42); Amityville, New York
- Batted: Left Threw: Left

MLB debut
- June 27, 1918, for the New York Giants

Last MLB appearance
- June 27, 1918, for the New York Giants

MLB statistics
- Games played: 1
- Earned run average: 0.00
- Strikeouts: 2
- Stats at Baseball Reference

Teams
- New York Giants (1918)

John Sidney Ross (June 27, 1892 – April 22, 1935) was a Major League Baseball pitcher. Ross appeared for the New York Giants in one game during the 1918 season, in relief. In that appearance, Ross pitched in 2.1 innings, and gave up two hits, with two strikeouts. He batted and threw left-handed.

Ross was born in San Rafael, California, and died in Amityville, New York.
