= Bob Larmore =

American baseball player (1896–1964)

- Shortstop
- Born: December 6, 1896; Anderson, Indiana, U.S.
- Died: January 15, 1964 (aged 67); St. Louis, Missouri, U.S.
- Batted: Right Threw: Right

MLB debut
- May 14, 1918, for the St. Louis Cardinals

Last MLB appearance
- June 22, 1918, for the St. Louis Cardinals

MLB statistics
- Batting average: .286
- Hits: 2
- Runs batted in: 1
- Stats at Baseball Reference

Teams
- St. Louis Cardinals (1918)

Robert McKahan Larmore (December 6, 1896 – January 15, 1964), known also as "Red" Larmore, was an American professional baseball player whose career spanned three seasons, which included one in Major League Baseball (MLB) St. Louis Cardinals (1918). Over his major league career, he batted .286 with two hits, and one run batted in (RBI) in four games played. He played the majority of his career in the minor leagues with the Houston Buffaloes (1918), Houston Buffaloes (1919), Dallas Marines (1919), Cedar Rapids Rabbits (1920), and Joplin Miners (1920). He compiled a .248 batting average in the minors with 254 hits, 33 doubles, 18 triples, and nine home runs in 251 games played. Larmore's MLB career was cut short in 1918 after he enlisted into the United States Navy to fight in World War I. He also attended the University of Missouri after his professional baseball career was over. During his career, he stood at 5 feet 10 inches (178 cm), and weighed 185 pounds (84 kg). Larmore batted, and threw right-handed.

== Early life, and St. Louis Cardinals ==
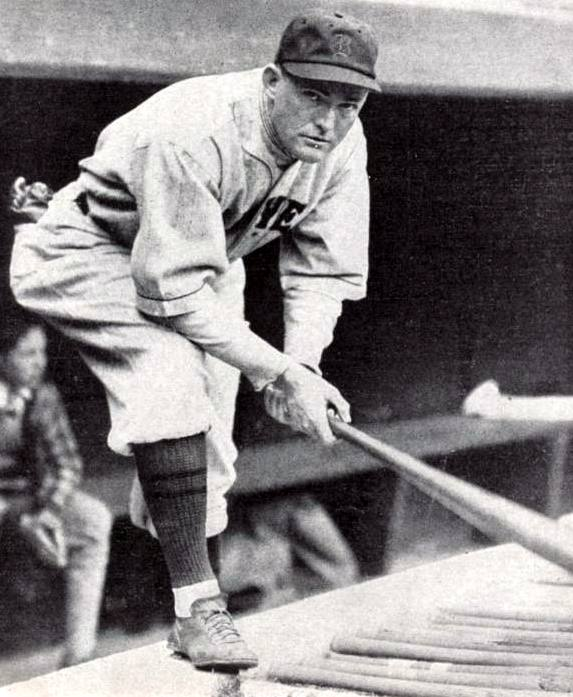
Larmore was signed by the St. Louis Cardinals as a temporary replacement for Rogers Hornsby (pictured), who was nursing an injury at the time.

Bob Larmore was born in Anderson, Indiana on December 6, 1896, to parents James, and Maude Larmore of Ohio, and Indiana, respectively. Fred G. Larmore owned and operated Larmore Ice Cream Company, which was incorporated in 1918. Bob Larmore attended Central High School in St. Louis Missouri. In May 1918, while still in high school, Larmore was signed by the Major League Baseball (MLB) St. Louis Cardinals. Before signing with Cardinals' manager Branch Rickey, Larmore informed him that he wished to continue attending school. He was the first player in the history of Major League Baseball to be playing for a team while still attending high school. Larmore's teachers at school allowed him to leave at noon every day to go to Cardinal Field. He was intended to be the fill-in at shortstop for St. Louis, who were absent a player at that position due to an injury to Rogers Hornsby.

Larmore made his MLB debut as a pinch runner on May 14, 1918, in a game against the Philadelphia Phillies. His first MLB hit came on May 18, in a game against the Boston Braves. On June 22, Larmore made his final MLB appearance. On the season with the Cardinals, he batted .286 with two hits, and one run batted in (RBI) in four games played. Larmore was farmed out to the minor league Houston Buffaloes of the Class B Texas League in late-June. With the Houston club, he batted .238 with five hits in eight games. In July, the Texas League suspended its operations due to World War I. That month, Larmore was re-called to the major leagues. However, he never made an appearance. In August, he enlisted into the United States Navy to fight in World War I.

== Minor leagues, and later life ==
At the start of the 1919 season, the St. Louis Cardinals sold Larmore to the minor league Houston Buffaloes. He reported to spring training with Houston in April 1919. On June 18, he was traded to the Dallas Marines, also of the Texas League, in exchange for Billy Patterson. Between the two clubs, he batted .240 with 124 hits, 20 doubles, seven triples, and three home runs in 110 games played. His last professional baseball season came in 1920. At the start of the season, Larmore played with the Cedar Rapids Rabbits of the Class-B Illinois–Indiana–Iowa League. With the Rabbits, he batted .266 with 111 hits, 12 doubles, 10 triples, and four home runs in 111 games played. Larmore then joined the Joplin Miners of the Class A Western League. He batted .194 with 14 hits, one double, and one triple in 22 games played.

After his career was over, Larmore enrolled at University of Missouri, and pledged Beta Theta Pi. By 1930, he was working as a salesman for his brother's ice cream company. He resided in St. Louis, Missouri with his wife Mary, and their child, Constance. Larmore died on January 15, 1964, at his home in St. Louis. He was buried at Oak Grove Cemetery in Bel-Nor.
