= Ray Schmandt =

American baseball player (1896-1969)

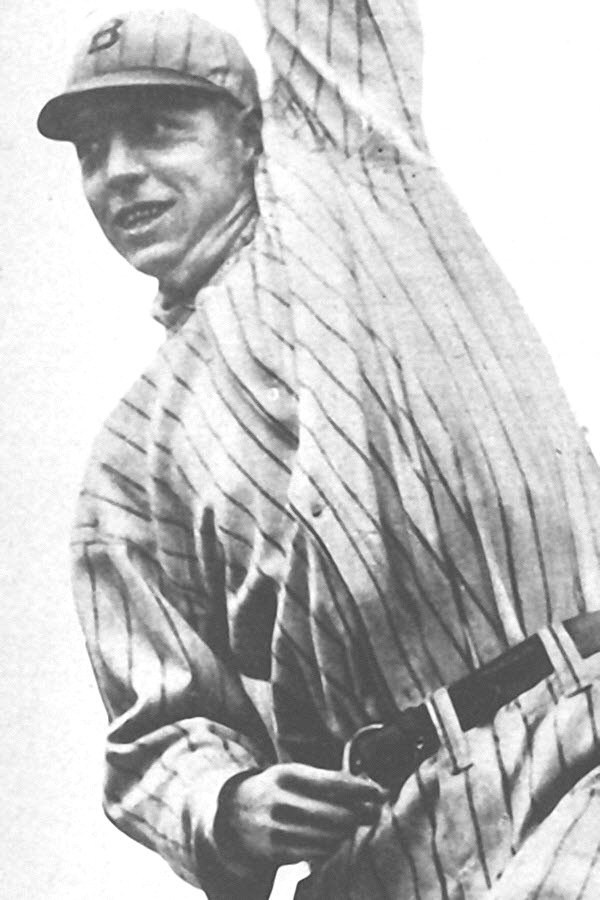
- First baseman
- Born: January 25, 1896; St. Louis, Missouri, US
- Died: February 2, 1969 (aged 73); St. Louis, Missouri, US
- Batted: Right Threw: Right

MLB debut
- June 25, 1915, for the St. Louis Browns

Last MLB appearance
- October 1, 1922, for the Brooklyn Robins

MLB statistics
- Batting average: .269
- Home runs: 3
- Runs batted in: 122
- Stats at Baseball Reference

Teams
- St. Louis Browns (1915); Brooklyn Robins (1918–1922)

Raymond Henry Schmandt (January 25, 1896 – February 2, 1969) was an American first baseman in Major League Baseball for the St. Louis Browns (1915) and Brooklyn Robins (1918–22).

In 6 seasons, he played in 317 games and had 1,054 at bats, 122 runs, 284 hits, 36 doubles, 13 triples, 3 home runs, 122 RBI, 11 stolen bases, 46 walks, .269 batting average, .301 on-base percentage, .337 slugging percentage, 355 total bases and 31 sacrifice hits. With the Robins, he won the 1920 National League pennant.

He died in St. Louis, at the age of 73.

== Sources ==
- Career statistics from Baseball Reference · Baseball Reference (Minors) · Retrosheet · Baseball Almanac
