= Ed Hemingway =

American baseball player (1893-1969)

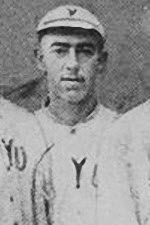
- Second baseman / Third baseman
- Born: May 8, 1893; Sheridan, Michigan, U.S.
- Died: July 5, 1969 (aged 76); Grand Rapids, Michigan, U.S.
- Batted: Both Threw: Right

MLB debut
- September 17, 1914, for the St. Louis Browns

Last MLB appearance
- August 14, 1918, for the Philadelphia Phillies

MLB statistics
- Batting average: .225
- Home runs: 0
- Runs batted in: 13
- Stats at Baseball Reference

Teams
- St. Louis Browns (1914); New York Giants (1917); Philadelphia Phillies (1918)

Edson Marshall Hemingway (May 8, 1893 – July 5, 1969) was an American professional baseball player. He was an infielder over parts of three seasons (1914, 1917–18) with the St. Louis Browns, New York Giants and Philadelphia Phillies. For his career, he compiled a .225 batting average in 138 at-bats, with 13 runs batted in.

He was born in Sheridan, Michigan and died in Grand Rapids, Michigan at the age of 76.
