= Doc Bass =

American baseball player (1898–1970)

- Pinch hitter
- Born: December 4, 1898; Macon, Georgia, U.S.
- Died: January 12, 1970 (aged 71); Macon, Georgia, U.S.
- Batted: Left Threw: Left

MLB debut
- July 29, 1918, for the Boston Braves

Last MLB appearance
- August 1, 1918, for the Boston Braves

MLB statistics
- Batting average: 1.000
- Hits: 1
- Stolen bases: 1
- Stats at Baseball Reference

Teams
- Boston Braves (1918)

William Capers "Doc" Bass (December 4, 1898 – January 12, 1970) was an American professional baseball player. He appeared in two games in Major League Baseball for the Boston Braves in 1918, once as a pinch hitter and once as a pinch runner.

In his major league career, Bass had one at bat, in which he singled. He also scored a run and stole a base, although he never appeared in the field. After the 1918 season, Bass continued to play minor league baseball until 1925, primarily as an outfielder.

== Sources ==
- Career statistics from Baseball Reference · Baseball Reference (Minors) · Retrosheet · Baseball Almanac
