= Buddy Napier =

American baseball player (1889–1968)

- Pitcher
- Born: December 18, 1889; Byromville, Georgia, U.S.
- Died: March 29, 1968 (aged 78); Hutchins, Texas, U.S.
- Batted: Right Threw: Right

MLB debut
- August 14, 1912, for the St. Louis Browns

Last MLB appearance
- July 16, 1921, for the Cincinnati Reds

MLB statistics
- Record: 5-6
- Earned run average: 3.92
- Strikeouts: 43
- Stats at Baseball Reference

Teams
- St. Louis Browns (1912); Chicago Cubs (1918); Cincinnati Reds (1920–1921)

Skelton Le Roy "Buddy" Napier (December 18, 1889 – March 29 1968) was an American Major League Baseball pitcher from 1912 to 1921. He was born in Byromville, Georgia.

== Major league career ==
Napier played his first major league game with the St. Louis Browns, on August 14, 1912, versus the Boston Red Sox, which the Browns lost 0-8. Napier signed on with the Chicago Cubs in 1918, pitching in only 1 game for the whole season. In 1920 he signed on with the Cincinnati Reds, and played for 2 more seasons before retiring. His final game was on July 16, 1921, in a doubleheader against the Philadelphia Phillies.

Buddy Napier died at the age of 78 on March 29, 1968, in Hutchins, Texas.
