= Dick Wheeler =

American baseball player (1898–1962)

- Outfielder
- Born: January 14, 1898; Keene, New Hampshire, U.S.
- Died: February 12, 1962 (aged 64); Lexington, Massachusetts, U.S.
- Batted: Right Threw: Right

MLB debut
- June 13, 1918, for the St. Louis Cardinals

Last MLB appearance
- June 17, 1918, for the St. Louis Cardinals

MLB statistics
- Batting average: .000
- Home runs: 0
- RBI: 0
- Stats at Baseball Reference

Teams
- St. Louis Cardinals (1918)

Richard Wheeler (January 14, 1898 in Keene, New Hampshire – February 12, 1962 in Lexington, Massachusetts) was an American right-handed Major League Baseball outfielder who played for the St. Louis Cardinals in 1918. He was born Richard Wheeler Maynard.

Prior to playing professionally, he attended Amherst College. At 20 years of age - the seventh youngest player in the league - Wheeler made his major league debut on June 13, 1918. He appeared in three games for the Cardinals that season, collecting no hits in six at-bats for a .000 batting average. On July 17, 1918, he appeared in his final game.

Following his death, he was interred at Westview Cemetery in Lexington, Massachusetts.
