= Tom Miller (pinch hitter) =

American baseball player

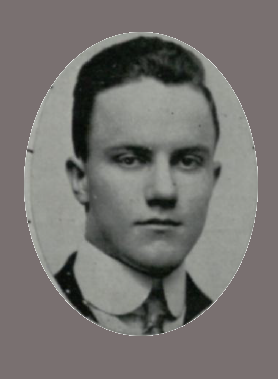
- 1917 yearbook photo
- Pinch hitter / Outfielder
- Born: July 5, 1897; Powhatan Court House, Virginia, U.S.
- Died: August 13, 1980 (aged 83); Richmond, Virginia, U.S.
- Batted: Left Threw: Right

MLB debut
- July 29, 1918, for the Boston Braves

Last MLB appearance
- May 3, 1919, for the Boston Braves

MLB statistics
- Batting average: .250
- Home runs: 0
- Runs batted in: 0
- Stats at Baseball Reference

Teams
- Boston Braves (1918 – 1919)

Thomas Royall Miller (July 5, 1897 – August 13, 1980) was an American Major League Baseball player. He attended the University of Richmond. He played two seasons with the Boston Braves from 1918 to 1919.
