= Gene Paulette =

American baseball player (1891–1966)

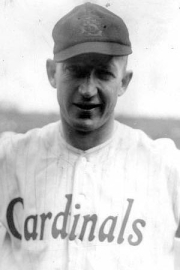
- Paulette, c. 1918
- Infielder
- Born: May 26, 1891; Centralia, Illinois, U.S.
- Died: February 8, 1966 (aged 74); Little Rock, Arkansas, U.S.
- Batted: Right Threw: Right

MLB debut
- June 16, 1911, for the New York Giants

Last MLB appearance
- October 3, 1920, for the Philadelphia Phillies

MLB statistics
- Batting average: .269
- Home runs: 2
- Runs batted in: 165
- Stats at Baseball Reference

Teams
- New York Giants (1911); St. Louis Browns (1916–1917); St. Louis Cardinals (1917–1919); Philadelphia Phillies (1919–1920)

Eugene Edward Paulette (May 26, 1891 – February 8, 1966) was an American Major League Baseball infielder from 1911 to 1920.

Paulette broke in briefly with the New York Giants in 1911; but from 1912 to 1916, he played in the Southern Association.

He made it back to the majors with the St. Louis Browns in 1916. The following season, he was selected off waivers by the St. Louis Cardinals and became their regular first baseman. Paulette was versatile on the field; he played every infield position for the Cardinals in 1918. In July 1919, he was traded to the Philadelphia Phillies. He played a career-high 143 games for them in 1920.

However, in the wake of the Black Sox Scandal, Paulette was permanently suspended from organized baseball. He had allegedly received gifts from St. Louis gamblers and also offered to throw some games early in the 1919 season. Paulette was reinstated by Commissioner Rob Manfred on May 13, 2025 along with other deceased players who were on the ineligible list.

In 500 games over six seasons, Paulette posted a .269 batting average (478-for-1780) with 160 runs, 2 home runs, 165 RBI, 43 stolen bases and 108 bases on balls. Defensively, he recorded an overall .984 fielding percentage.

Paulette was reinstated by Commissioner Rob Manfred on May 13, 2025 along with other deceased players who were on the ineligible list.

== See also ==
- List of people banned from Major League Baseball
