= Red Sheridan =

American baseball player (1896-1975)

- Shortstop/Second baseman
- Born: November 14, 1896; Brooklyn, New York, U.S.
- Died: November 25, 1975 (aged 79); Queens Village, New York, U.S.
- Batted: Right Threw: Right

MLB debut
- July 3, 1918, for the Brooklyn Robins

Last MLB appearance
- October 1, 1920, for the Brooklyn Robins

MLB statistics
- Batting average: .167
- Home runs: 0
- Runs batted in: 0
- Stats at Baseball Reference

Teams
- Brooklyn Robins (1918,1920)

Eugene Anthony "Red" Sheridan (November 14, 1896 – November 25, 1975) was an American professional baseball player who played in five games at second base and shortstop for the Brooklyn Robins in 1918 and 1920.
