= Gary Fortune =

American baseball player (1894–1955)

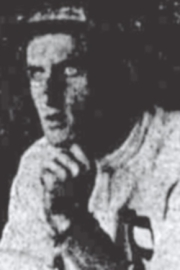
- Pitcher
- Born: October 11, 1894; High Point, North Carolina, U.S.
- Died: September 23, 1955 (aged 60); Washington, D.C., U.S.
- Batted: Both Threw: Right

MLB debut
- October 5, 1916, for the Philadelphia Phillies

Last MLB appearance
- August 2, 1920, for the Boston Red Sox

MLB statistics
- Win–loss record: 0–5
- Strikeouts: 23
- Earned run average: 6.61
- Stats at Baseball Reference

Teams
- Philadelphia Phillies (1916, 1918); Boston Red Sox (1920)

Garrett Reese Fortune (October 11, 1894 – September 23, 1955) was an American pitcher in Major League Baseball who played between 1916 and 1920 for the Philadelphia Phillies (1916, 1918) and Boston Red Sox (1920). Listed at 5 ft 11.5 in (1.82 m), 176 pounds (80 kg), Fortune was a switch-hitter and threw left-handed. He was born in High Point, North Carolina.

In a three-season career, Fortune posted a 0–5 record with 23 strikeouts and a 6.61 ERA in 20 appearances, including six starts, two complete games, 11 games finished, 46 walks, and 77.2 innings of work.

Fortune died in Washington, D.C., in 1955, at age 60.

== Sources ==
- Career statistics from Baseball Reference · Baseball Reference (Minors) · Retrosheet · Baseball Almanac
- Retrosheet
