= Ed Sicking =

American baseball player (1897–1978)

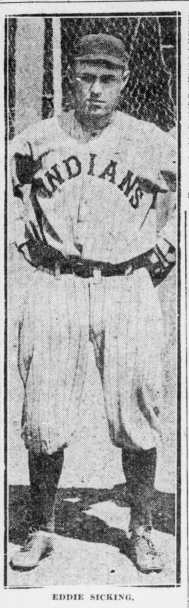
- Infielder
- Born: March 30, 1897; St. Bernard, Ohio, U.S.
- Died: August 30, 1978 (aged 81); Madeira, Ohio, U.S.
- Batted: Right Threw: Right

MLB debut
- August 26, 1916, for the Chicago Cubs

Last MLB appearance
- May 3, 1927, for the Pittsburgh Pirates

MLB statistics
- Batting average: .226
- Home runs: 0
- Runs batted in: 59
- Stats at Baseball Reference

Teams
- Chicago Cubs (1916); New York Giants (1918–1919); Philadelphia Phillies (1919); New York Giants (1920); Cincinnati Reds (1920); Pittsburgh Pirates (1927)

Edward Joseph Sicking (March 30, 1897 – August 30, 1978) was an American Major League Baseball infielder who played for five teams from 1916 to 1927. He appeared at second base, third base, and shortstop.
