= Pat Moran =

American baseball player and manager (1876–1924)

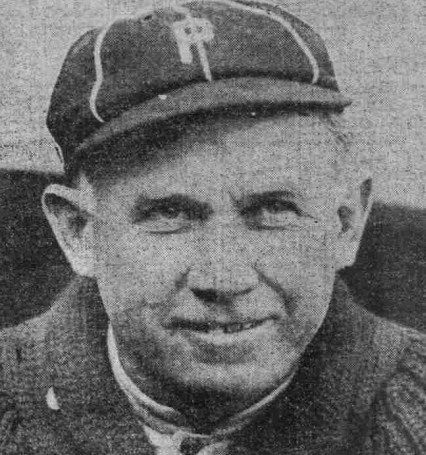
- Catcher / Manager
- Born: February 7, 1876; Fitchburg, Massachusetts, U.S.
- Died: March 7, 1924 (aged 48); Orlando, Florida, U.S.
- Batted: Right Threw: Right

MLB debut
- May 15, 1901, for the Boston Beaneaters

Last MLB appearance
- June 30, 1914, for the Philadelphia Phillies

MLB statistics
- Batting average: .235
- Home runs: 18
- Runs batted in: 262
- Managerial record: 748–586
- Winning %: .561
- Stats at Baseball Reference
- Managerial record at Baseball Reference

Teams
- As player: Boston Beaneaters (1901–1905); Chicago Cubs (1906–1909); Philadelphia Phillies (1910–1914); As manager: Philadelphia Phillies (1915–1918); Cincinnati Reds (1919–1923)

Career highlights and awards
- 2× World Series champion (1907, 1919)

Patrick Joseph Moran (February 7, 1876 – March 7, 1924) was an American professional baseball player and manager. He was a catcher in Major League Baseball from 1901 to 1914. The year after his retirement, he became a manager, and he led two teams to their first-ever modern-era National League championships: the 1915 Philadelphia Phillies and the 1919 Cincinnati Reds. Moran was the first manager to win National League pennants with two different teams. Moran's 1919 Reds also captured their first World Series championship.

== Playing career ==
A native of Fitchburg, Massachusetts, Moran played 819 games over 14 National League seasons for the Boston Beaneaters (1901–05), Chicago Cubs (1906–09) and Phillies (1910–14). A right-handed hitter, he batted .235 with 18 home runs and 262 RBI. In 1903, he finished tied for second in the league in home runs with seven. After 1904 he did not appear in more than 100 games in a season. However, as a second-string catcher, Moran became a student of the game and especially of pitching. In 1913–1914, he was a player-coach and, guided by his support and counsel, Phillies right-hander Grover Cleveland Alexander developed into one of the greatest pitchers of all time.

== Philadelphia Phillies' manager ==
Moran retired as a player after the 1914 season, and was immediately promoted to manager of the Phillies. The club had finished sixth in 1914 and was plagued by defections (and threatened defections) to the outlaw Federal League. Moran swung some astute trades, acquiring key players Dave Bancroft (a Baseball Hall of Fame like Alexander), Bert Niehoff and Milt Stock. Then—led by Alexander's 31 wins and the slugging of right fielder Gavvy Cravath—the Phillies improved by 17 games and won their first NL pennant. In the 1915 World Series, they were defeated four games to one by the Boston Red Sox.

The Phillies then finished second in successive years, to the Brooklyn Robins in 1916 and the New York Giants in 1917. With baseball disrupted by World War I (and with the December 11, 1917, trade of Alexander to the Cubs) the Phillies sank below .500 in 1918 and Moran was fired.

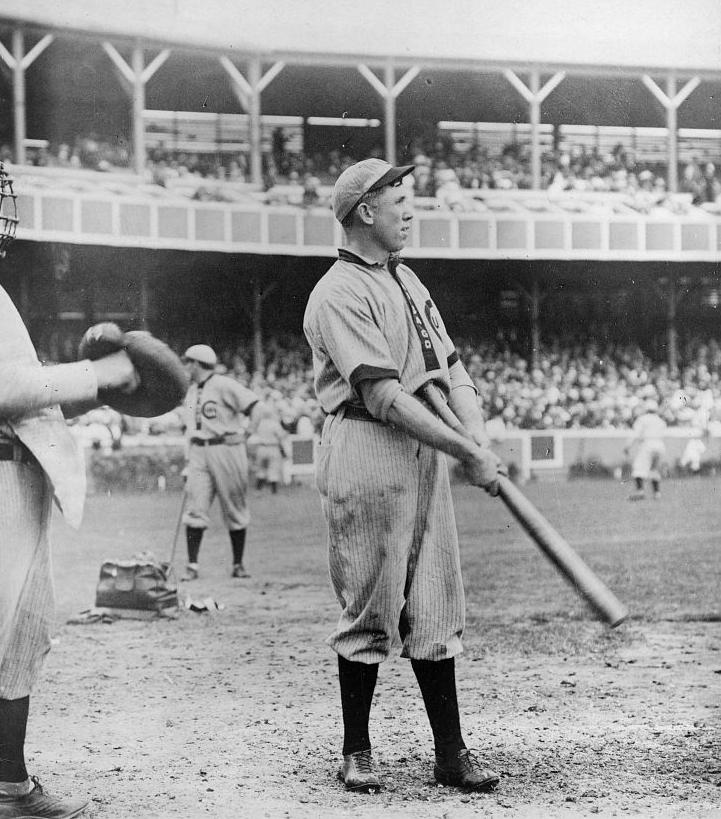
Pat Moran batting for Chicago Cubs, 1908

== Cincinnati Reds' manager ==
Moran was not unemployed for long, however. Cincinnati Reds manager Christy Mathewson, the former pitching great, had been stricken with tuberculosis from exposure to poison gas during military maneuvers. When it was apparent that Mathewson was too sick to return for the 1919 season, Moran was named his successor. The Reds had finished third, 15 1/2 games behind, in 1918. Under Moran, they won 96 of 140 games in an abbreviated 1919 schedule to take the flag by nine games. They then defeated the Chicago White Sox in the 1919 World Series five games to three, to win Cincinnati's first undisputed world championship.

This should have been Moran's crowning accomplishment, but it would later be marred by the Black Sox scandal. In 1920, it was charged that eight key members of the White Sox had conspired with gamblers to "throw" the series. The players were acquitted in a controversial 1921 trial but were nonetheless expelled from baseball. In the wake of the scandal, Moran, his players and many baseball experts furiously asserted that Cincinnati would have won the series under any circumstances.

Moran remained at the helm in Cincinnati during the early 1920s. Apart from a poor 1921 campaign, the Reds fielded contending ballclubs but did not return to the World Series. The club finished second in both 1922 and 1923. While spending the winter of 1923–24 at his Fitchburg home, Moran was taken ill. He was able to report to the Reds' training camp in Orlando, Florida, but his condition worsened and he died there at the age of 48. The cause of death was listed as Bright's Disease, a kidney ailment, but some baseball historians ascribe Moran's fatal illness to alcoholism.

Moran won 748 games and lost 586 (.561) as a National League manager over nine seasons, and he has the most wins for any manager in a nine season span. He won six and lost seven World Series games. The Hardball Times wrote that Moran "might be the most underrated manager in baseball history ... he managed only nine seasons before dying over 80 years ago. However, in that brief stretch Moran was clearly on pace for Cooperstown."

== Managerial record ==
Team	Year	Regular season					Postseason			
Team	Year	Games	Won	Lost	Win %	Finish	Won	Lost	Win %	Result
PHI	1915	153	90	62	.592	1st in NL	1	4	.200	Lost World Series (BOS)
PHI	1916	154	91	62	.595	2nd in NL	–	–	–	–
PHI	1917	154	87	65	.572	2nd in NL	–	–	–	–
PHI	1918	125	55	68	.447	6th in NL	–	–	–	–
PHI total		586	323	257	.557		1	4	.200	
CIN	1919	140	96	44	.686	1st in NL	5	3	.625	Won World Series (CHW)
CIN	1920	154	82	71	.536	3rd in NL	–	–	–	–
CIN	1921	153	70	83	.458	6th in NL	–	–	–	–
CIN	1922	156	86	68	.558	2nd in NL	–	–	–	–
CIN	1923	154	91	63	.591	2nd in NL	–	–	–	–
CIN total		757	425	329	.564		5	3	.625	
Total		1,343	748	586	.561		6	7	.462	
