= Doug Baird (baseball) =

American baseball player (1891–1967)

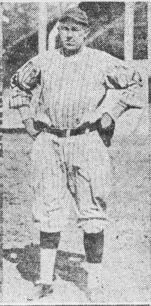
- Third baseman
- Born: September 27, 1891; St. Charles, Missouri, U.S.
- Died: June 13, 1967 (aged 75); Thomasville, Georgia, U.S.
- Batted: Right Threw: Right

MLB debut
- April 18, 1915, for the Pittsburgh Pirates

Last MLB appearance
- October 2, 1920, for the New York Giants

MLB statistics
- Batting average: .234
- Home runs: 6
- Runs batted in: 191
- Stats at Baseball Reference

Teams
- Pittsburgh Pirates (1915–1917); St. Louis Cardinals (1917–1919); Philadelphia Phillies (1919); Brooklyn Robins (1919–1920); New York Giants (1920)

Howard Douglas Baird (September 27, 1891 – June 13, 1967) was an American professional baseball player who played third base in Major League Baseball from 1915 to 1920. He went to college at Westminster College.
