= Larry Jacobus =

American baseball player (1894–1965)

- Pitcher
- Born: December 13, 1894; Cincinnati, Ohio, U.S.
- Died: August 19, 1965 (aged 70); North College Hill, Ohio, U.S.
- Batted: Both Threw: Right

MLB debut
- July 15, 1918, for the Cincinnati Reds

Last MLB appearance
- August 1, 1918, for the Cincinnati Reds

MLB statistics
- Win–loss record: 0-1
- Earned run average: 5.71
- Strikeouts: 8
- Stats at Baseball Reference

Teams
- Cincinnati Reds (1918)

Stuart Louis "Larry" Jacobus (December 13, 1894 – August 19, 1965) was an American professional baseball pitcher from 1915 to 1927. He spent most of his career in the Texas League and played five games in Major League Baseball for the Cincinnati Reds. Jacobus was 6 feet, 2 inches (1.87 meters) tall and weighed 186 pounds (84 kilograms).

== Career ==
Jacobus was born in Cincinnati, Ohio, in 1894. He started his professional baseball career in 1915 with the Ohio State League's Portsmouth Cobblers. That season, he had a win–loss record of 19-9 and helped Portsmouth win the pennant. Jacobus then moved on to the Texas League's Galveston Pirates in 1916. He went 2-3 in his first year in the league and 10-13 in his second.

In September 1917, Jacobus was drafted by the Cincinnati Reds in the Rule 5 draft. He was with the team early in the following season but did not pitch well enough to appear in a regular season game until July. Jacobus made five relief appearances for the Reds in July and August 1918 and went 0-1 with a 5.71 earned run average. On August 13, he was released, and the Pittsburgh Press reported that he "[was] not in shape to work and [was] of no use to the team."

Jacobus then spent the rest of his career in the Texas League. He had winning records from 1919 to 1921. In 1921, he had his only 20-win season, going 20-16 with a 3.08 ERA for the Beaumont Exporters. In 1925, he went 9-22 to set a career-high in losses and lead the league in that category, as well. Jacobus pitched for the Houston Buffaloes in 1926 and 1927.

In February 1928, Jacobus was involved in a car accident. He lost the use of his right eye and never played professional baseball again. He died in at his home in North College Hill, Ohio, in 1965.
