= Rip Conway =

American baseball player (1896-1972)

- Second baseman
- Born: April 18, 1896; White Bear Lake, Minnesota, U.S.
- Died: April 18, 1972 (aged 76); Saint Paul, Minnesota, U.S.
- Batted: Left Threw: Right

MLB debut
- April 16, 1918, for the Boston Braves

Last MLB appearance
- June 15, 1918, for the Boston Braves

MLB statistics
- Batting average: .167
- Home runs: 0
- Runs batted in: 2
- Stats at Baseball Reference

Teams
- Boston Braves (1918)

Richard Daniel "Rip" Conway (April 18, 1896 – December 2, 1972) was an American professional baseball second baseman who played in Major League Baseball for the Boston Braves in 1918.

Born in White Bear Lake, Minnesota, Conway played in the Eastern League (EL) in 1917, posting a .309 batting average for the Worcester Busters. Conway played his only Major League season in 1918, batting .167 with 2 RBI in 14 games. In March 1919, the Southern Association's (SA) Memphis Chickasaws acquired him. Conway played for three teams in 1919: the SA's Chickasaws and Mobile Bears, and the Texas League's Fort Worth Panthers; he batted a combined .247. With the EL's Worcester Boosters, he batted .329 in 1921, with nine home runs. From 1922 to 1924, Conway played for two EL teams each year; these included the Boosters, Hartford Senators, Worcester Panthers, and Waterbury Brasscos. In 1923, he had a combined .347 batting average for the Senators and Panthers.
