= Chuck Ward =

American baseball player (1894–1969)

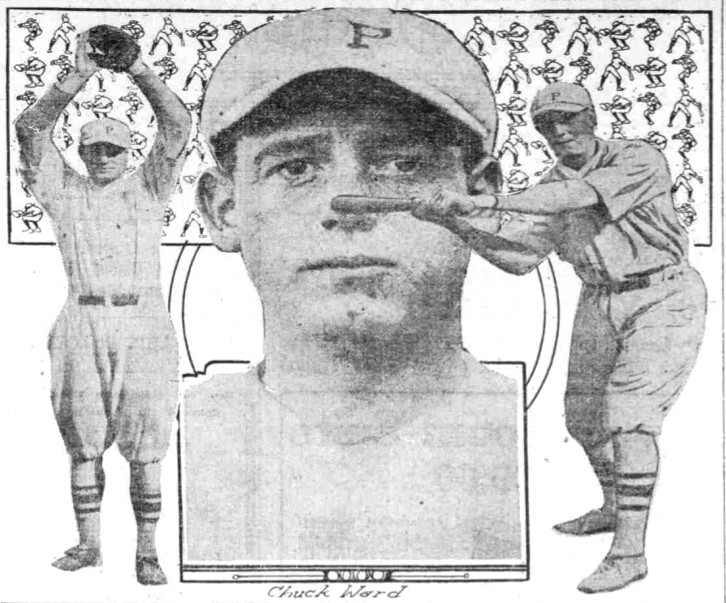
- Shortstop
- Born: July 30, 1894; St. Louis, Missouri, U.S.
- Died: April 4, 1969 (aged 74); Indian Rocks, Florida, U.S.
- Batted: Right Threw: Right

MLB debut
- April 11, 1917, for the Pittsburgh Pirates

Last MLB appearance
- September 24, 1922, for the Brooklyn Robins

MLB statistics
- Batting average: .228
- Home runs: 0
- Runs batted in: 72
- Stats at Baseball Reference

Teams
- Pittsburgh Pirates (1917); Brooklyn Robins (1918–1922)

Charles William Ward (July 30, 1894 – April 4, 1969) was an American professional baseball player who played shortstop for the Pittsburgh Pirates in 1917 and the Brooklyn Robins from 1918 to 1922.
