= Ted Menze =

American baseball player (1897–1969)

- Outfielder
- Born: November 4, 1897; St. Louis, Missouri, U.S.
- Died: December 23, 1969 (aged 72); St. Louis, Missouri, U.S.
- Batted: Right Threw: Right

MLB debut
- April 23, 1918, for the St. Louis Cardinals

Last MLB appearance
- April 23, 1918, for the St. Louis Cardinals

MLB statistics
- Games played: 1
- At bats: 3
- Hits: 0
- Stats at Baseball Reference

Teams
- St. Louis Cardinals (1918)

Theodore Charles Menze (November 4, 1897 – December 23, 1969) was an American outfielder in Major League Baseball. He played for the St. Louis Cardinals in 1918.
