= Dutch Distel =

American baseball player (1896–1967)

- Second baseman
- Born: April 15, 1896; Madison, Indiana, U.S.
- Died: February 12, 1967 (aged 70); Madison, Indiana, U.S.
- Batted: Right Threw: Right

MLB debut
- June 21, 1918, for the St. Louis Cardinals

Last MLB appearance
- June 27, 1918, for the St. Louis Cardinals

MLB statistics
- Batting average: .176
- Home runs: 0
- Runs batted in: 1
- Stats at Baseball Reference

Teams
- St. Louis Cardinals (1918)

George Adam "Dutch" Distel (April 15, 1896 – February 12, 1967) was an American second baseman in Major League Baseball. He played for the St. Louis Cardinals in 1918.
