= Harry Heitmann =

American baseball player (1896-1958)

- Pitcher
- Born: October 6, 1896; Albany, New York, U.S.
- Died: December 15, 1958 (aged 62); Brooklyn, New York City, U.S.
- Batted: Right Threw: Right

MLB debut
- July 27, 1918, for the Brooklyn Robins

Last MLB appearance
- July 27, 1918, for the Brooklyn Robins

MLB statistics
- Win–loss record: 0–1
- Earned run average: inf
- Innings pitched: 0
- Batters faced: 4
- Earned runs: 4
- Stats at Baseball Reference

Teams
- Brooklyn Robins (1918)

Henry Anton Heitmann (October 6, 1896 – December 15, 1958) was an American pitcher in Major League Baseball (MLB). He pitched in one game for the Brooklyn Robins during the 1918 baseball season, getting the start against the St. Louis Cardinals on July 27, 1918, in the second game of a doubleheader.

Heitmann had been called up to the majors after a glittering debut season in the minors with Rochester, where he went 17–6 with a 1.32 earned run average (ERA). Unfortunately, his major league career would not be anywhere near as successful—although for nearly one hundred years there was a discrepancy in the account of just how unsuccessful Heitmann was in his one ML game. Written newspaper accounts claim he faced four batters and got none of them out, while the published box score indicated he faced five batters and got one out. In both accounts, the four batters who reached safely all did so on base hits, and all came around to score the first four runs in a 22–7 St. Louis victory, tagging Heitmann with the loss. Official baseball statistics went with the box score version, crediting Heitmann with pitching one-third of an inning and finishing his career with an ERA of 108.00.

However, recent research by the Society for American Baseball Research confirms the newspaper accounts. As of 2011, Heitmann is now credited with facing four batters, giving up four hits and four runs, and being one of 19 players who retired from the major leagues with an ERA of infinity.

The aftermath of Heitmann's appearance has also become part of baseball lore. According to contemporary accounts, Heitmann was pulled from the game, then—even as the game continued—he immediately packed up his belongings, left the stadium, and enlisted in the Navy. Other accounts have Heitmann already enlisted in the Navy, and leaving the stadium to return to the Brooklyn Naval base. Whether or not this legend is strictly true is open to debate. In any event, Heitmann's naval career didn't last that long; by 1919 he was again pitching for Rochester. Heitmann enjoyed a relatively long and successful minor league career that lasted until 1928, switching from pitching to being primarily an outfielder/first baseman by the mid-1920s. He finished his minor league career with a 68–46 win–loss record, and a .292 batting average in nearly 2,000 at bats.
