= Charlie Hollocher =

American baseball player (1896–1940)

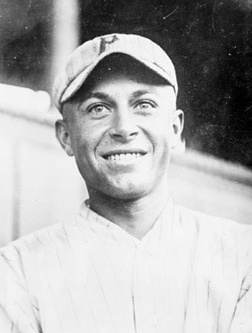
- Shortstop
- Born: June 11, 1896; St. Louis, Missouri, U.S.
- Died: August 14, 1940 (aged 44); Frontenac, Missouri, U.S.
- Batted: Left Threw: Right

MLB debut
- April 16, 1918, for the Chicago Cubs

Last MLB appearance
- August 20, 1924, for the Chicago Cubs

MLB statistics
- Batting average: .304
- Home runs: 14
- Runs batted in: 241
- Stats at Baseball Reference

Teams
- Chicago Cubs (1918–1924)

Charles Jacob Hollocher (June 11, 1896 – August 14, 1940) was an American professional baseball player who was a shortstop in Major League Baseball.

== Biography ==
Born in St. Louis, Hollocher was a shortstop for the Chicago Cubs from 1918 to 1924. His cousin Bob Klinger was also a Major League Baseball player.

Hollocher helped the Cubs win the National League pennant in 1918. (In that year the professional baseball season was prematurely curtailed due to World War I.) That season he led the National League in games (131), at bats (509), hits (161), total bases (202), singles (130) and runs created (76, although this statistic was a retroactive metric).

In 1922 he led the National League in at bats per strikeout (118.4), which to this day remains the Cubs' single season record. His five strikeouts for the entire season remains the National League record by a player with a minimum of 150 games.

Hollocher left the Cubs in August 1923 due to depression, apparently linked to an undiagnosed intestinal disorder. He tried a comeback in 1924, but was unable to complete the season.

He killed himself in Frontenac, Missouri, on August 14, 1940, when he shot himself in the throat. He had suffered from depression most of his adult life.

In 760 games over 7 seasons, Hollocher compiled a .304 batting average (894-for-2936) with 411 runs, 145 doubles, 35 triples, 14 home runs, 241 RBI, 99 stolen bases, 277 base on balls, 94 strikeouts, .370 on-base percentage and .392 slugging percentage. He posted a .954 fielding percentage. He appeared in the 1918 World Series, batting .190 (4-for-21) with 2 runs and 1 RBI.
