= Buzz Murphy =

American baseball player (1895–1938)

- Outfielder
- Born: April 26, 1895; Denver, Colorado
- Died: May 11, 1938 (aged 43); Denver, Colorado
- Batted: Left Threw: Left

MLB debut
- July 14, 1918, for the Boston Braves

Last MLB appearance
- September 21, 1919, for the Washington Senators

MLB statistics
- Batting average: .275
- Home runs: 1
- Runs batted in: 37
- Stats at Baseball Reference

Teams
- Boston Braves (1918); Washington Senators (1919)

Robert Sylvester "Buzz" Murphy (April 26, 1895 – May 11, 1938) was a Major League Baseball outfielder. He played two seasons in the majors, playing in nine games for the Boston Braves in 1918, then moving on to the Washington Senators for 1919, where he was their top reserve outfielder.
