= Jimmy Archer =

Irish baseball player (1883–1958)

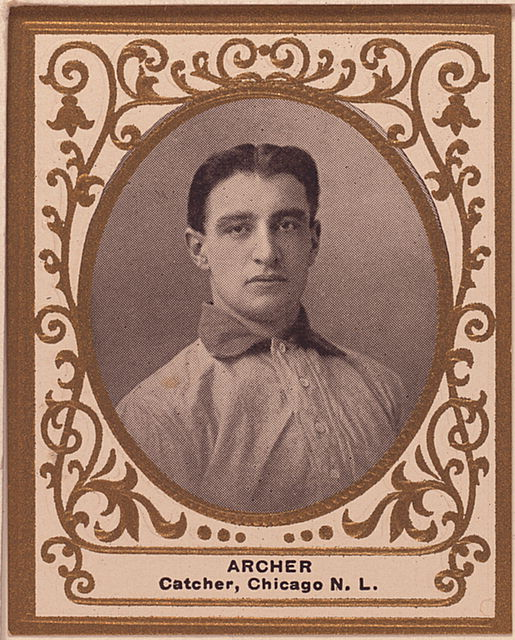
- Catcher
- Born: May 13, 1883; Dublin, Ireland
- Died: March 29, 1958 (aged 74); Milwaukee, Wisconsin, U.S.
- Batted: Right Threw: Right

MLB debut
- September 6, 1904, for the Pittsburgh Pirates

Last MLB appearance
- September 2, 1918, for the Cincinnati Reds

MLB statistics
- Batting average: .249
- Home runs: 16
- Runs batted in: 299
- Stats at Baseball Reference

Teams
- Pittsburgh Pirates (1904); Detroit Tigers (1907); Chicago Cubs (1909–1917); Brooklyn Robins (1918); Pittsburgh Pirates (1918); Cincinnati Reds (1918)

Member of the Canadian

Baseball Hall of Fame
- Induction: 1990

James Patrick Archer (May 13, 1883 – March 29, 1958) was an Irish-born catcher in Major League Baseball (MLB) who spent nearly his entire career with four National League teams, primarily the Chicago Cubs, for whom he played from 1909 to 1917. Born in Dublin, he also played for the Pittsburgh Pirates in 1904, the American League's Detroit Tigers in 1907, and the Pirates, Brooklyn Robins and Cincinnati Reds in 1918. As a catcher, he could remain squatting and still throw out runners attempting to steal second base due to his unique arm strength, which became his trademark, acquired from the healing of burns that shortened his muscles after an industrial accident in which Archer fell into a vat of boiling sap at the age of 19.

His family immigrated to Montreal when he was an infant, later moving to Toronto when he was three; he attended Toronto's De La Salle College and St. Michael's College School. He was working at a barrelmaker in Toronto in 1902 when he suffered the burns which led to a three-month hospitalization. In 1903 he began playing baseball in Manitoba, and in 1904 he joined the Boone, Iowa based Boone Coal Miners team of the Iowa State League; he married Boone resident Lillian Stark in 1905. In August 1904 he was purchased by the Pittsburgh Pirates, and he went on to play seven games for the team that season.

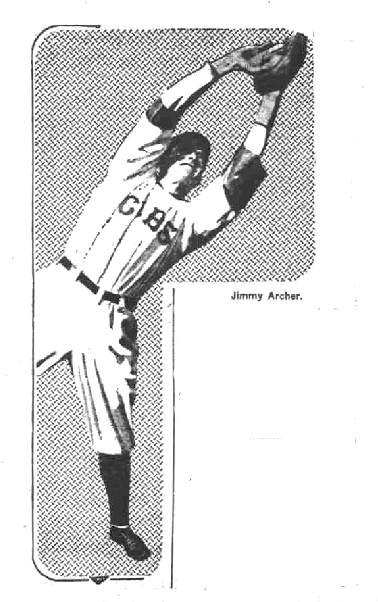
Newspaper photo showing Archer making a catch while playing with the Cubs in 1915.

He later played for Detroit for 18 games during the 1907 season, and started the fifth and final game of the 1907 World Series against the Cubs, but was hitless in three at bats as the Tigers lost 2–0; both Cub runs followed successful stolen bases against Archer and pitcher George Mullin. In 1909 he began playing for the Cubs, the team he remained with until 1917; he took over catching duties for Johnny Kling, one of the top players on the Cubs pennant winners of 1906 to 1908, who was taking a year off from baseball to pursue other interests. Archer split time with Pat Moran during the 1909 season, and with Kling upon his return for the 1910 season. He played three games en route to the Cubs' 1910 World Series loss to the Philadelphia Athletics, and after doubling with one out, scored the winning run on Jimmy Sheckard's hit with two out in the bottom of the 10th inning of Game 4 – the 4–3 victory giving the Cubs their only win in the Series. However, he had only one other hit in the Series, that coming with two out in the bottom of the ninth inning of Game 5 when the Cubs were trailing 7–2.

In 1911 Archer won the starting job, and Kling was later that season traded to the Boston Rustlers. Archer ended up finishing 16th in voting for the first Chalmers Award, the first formal Most Valuable Player Award presented in the major leagues. During the 1912 and 1913 seasons, Archer again earned some votes for the Chalmers Award, finishing 22nd in 1912 and 13th in 1913. He led the NL in assists in 1912 with 149, but also paced the league with 23 errors. However, he began to split time at catcher with Roger Bresnahan in 1914 and 1915. After playing 77 games in 1916 and only two in 1917, Archer was released by the Cubs. Over the course of the 1918 season, he played for three separate teams. He signed as a free agent with the Pirates on March 10, and played 24 games with them. However, he had a batting average of only .155 during that time and was released. He later played for the Brooklyn Robins and Cincinnati Reds for nine games each until his retirement at the end of the season.

In 847 games over 12 seasons, Archer posted a .249 batting average (660 hits in 2646 at bats) with 247 runs, 16 home runs, 299 runs batted in and 36 stolen bases. He recorded an overall .972 fielding percentage. In four World Series games, he hit .143 (2-for-14).

After his retirement from baseball, Archer worked as a hog purchaser for the Armour meat packing company in Chicago. He received a medal from the National Safety Council in 1931 after using prone pressure resuscitation to revive two truck drivers who had been overcome by carbon monoxide in the Union Stock Yards. Archer died at St. Mary's Hospital in Milwaukee, Wisconsin at the age of 74, due to a blocked coronary artery following treatment for spinal tuberculosis. He was interred at Sacred Heart Cemetery in Boone, Iowa, his wife's hometown. He was elected to the Canadian Baseball Hall of Fame in 1990.

== See also ==
- List of players from Ireland in Major League Baseball
