= Marty Herrmann =

American baseball player (1893–1956)

- Pitcher
- Born: January 10, 1893; Oldenburg, Indiana
- Died: September 11, 1956 (aged 63); Cincinnati
- Batted: Left Threw: Left

MLB debut
- July 10, 1918, for the Brooklyn Robins

Last MLB appearance
- July 10, 1918, for the Brooklyn Robins

MLB statistics
- Win–loss record: 0–0
- Earned run average: 0.00
- Strikeouts: 0
- Stats at Baseball Reference

Teams
- Brooklyn Robins (1918)

Martin John Herrmann (January 10, 1893 in Oldenburg, Indiana – September 11, 1956 in Cincinnati) was a pitcher in Major League Baseball. He pitched in one game for the Brooklyn Robins during the 1918 baseball season, working one scoreless inning on July 10.

His grandson, catcher Ed Herrmann, had a much longer professional career in the late 1960s and 1970s.
