= Mickey Devine (baseball) =

American baseball player (1892–1937)

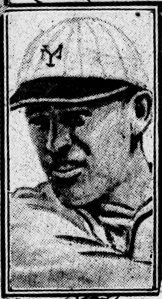
- Catcher
- Born: May 9, 1892; Albany, New York, U.S.
- Died: October 1, 1937 (aged 45); Albany, New York, U.S.
- Batted: Right Threw: Right

MLB debut
- August 2, 1918, for the Philadelphia Phillies

Last MLB appearance
- September 26, 1925, for the New York Giants

MLB statistics
- Batting average: .226
- Home runs: 0
- Runs batted in: 4
- Stats at Baseball Reference

Teams
- Philadelphia Phillies (1918); Boston Red Sox (1920); New York Giants (1925)

William Patrick "Mickey" Devine (May 9, 1892 – October 1, 1937) was an American backup catcher in Major League Baseball who played for three different teams between 1918 and 1925. Listed at 5 ft 10 in (1.78 m), 165 lb., Devine batted and threw right-handed. He was born in Albany, New York.

Devine entered the majors in 1918 with the Philadelphia Phillies, playing for them one year before joining the Boston Red Sox (1920) and New York Giants (1925). His most productive came with the 1925 Giants, when he posted a .273 batting average with four runs batted in in 33 games – all career-highs.

In a three season-career, Devine was a .226 hitter (12-for-53) with seven runs and four RBI in 33 games, including four doubles and one stolen base with no home runs.

Devine died at his home of Albany, New York at the age of 45.
