= Ty Pickup =

American baseball player

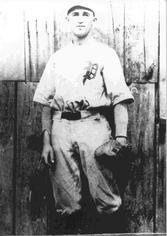
- Outfielder
- Born: October 29, 1897; Philadelphia, Pennsylvania, U.S.
- Died: August 2, 1974 (aged 76); Philadelphia, Pennsylvania, U.S.
- Batted: Right Threw: Right

MLB debut
- April 30, 1918, for the Philadelphia Phillies

Last MLB appearance
- April 30, 1918, for the Philadelphia Phillies

MLB statistics
- Games played: 1
- At bats: 1
- Hits: 1
- Stats at Baseball Reference

Teams
- Philadelphia Phillies (1918)

Clarence William "Ty" Pickup (October 29, 1897 – August 2, 1974) was an American professional baseball player. He played one game for the Philadelphia Phillies in 1918.

== Career ==
Pickup was born in Philadelphia, Pennsylvania, in 1897. He started his professional baseball career in 1918. That season, he played in his first and only Major League Baseball game on April 30 for the Philadelphia Phillies. Pickup singled in his only at bat and played one inning in right field. He also appeared in 49 games for the Eastern League's New London Planters in 1918 and had a batting average of .234.

The following year, Pickup played for the Eastern League's Pittsfield Hillies. He batted .285 in 100 games played, and according to the Milwaukee Journal, he was one of the stars of the club, which won the pennant. Pickup then played for three different minor league teams in 1920, batting .236 overall, and then batted .243 in 1921. He was out of professional baseball for six years before returning for one season, in 1928, in the Eastern Carolina League. That year, he set career-highs with a .293 batting average and nine home runs.

Pickup died in Philadelphia in 1974 and was buried in St. Dominic Cemetery.
