= Jake Hehl =

American baseball player (1899-1961)

- Pitcher
- Born: December 10, 1899; Brooklyn, New York, U.S.
- Died: July 4, 1961 (aged 61); Brooklyn, New York, U.S.
- Batted: Right Threw: Right

MLB debut
- June 20, 1918, for the Brooklyn Robins

Last MLB appearance
- June 20, 1918, for the Brooklyn Robins

MLB statistics
- Win–loss record: 0–0
- Earned run average: 0.00
- Strikeouts: 0
- Stats at Baseball Reference

Teams
- Brooklyn Robins (1918)

Herman Charles Hehl (December 10, 1899 – July 4, 1961) was an American pitcher in Major League Baseball. He pitched in one game for the Brooklyn Robins during the 1918 baseball season, working one scoreless inning on June 20, 1918.
