= Red Massey =

American baseball player (1890-1954)

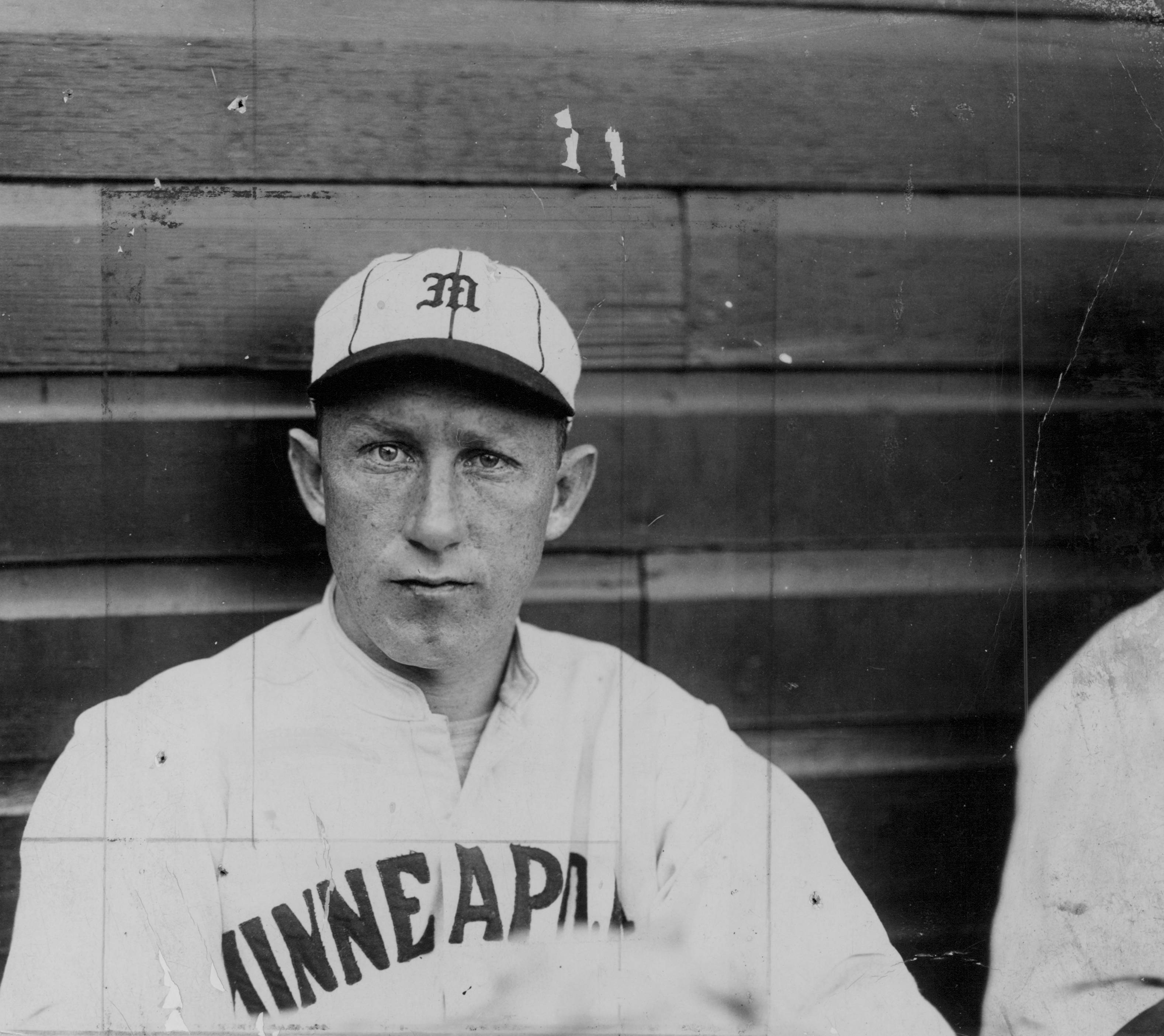
- Outfielder
- Born: October 9, 1890; Sevierville, Tennessee, U.S.
- Died: June 23, 1954 (aged 63); Atlanta, Georgia, U.S.
- Batted: Left Threw: Right

MLB debut
- April 16, 1918, for the Boston Braves

Last MLB appearance
- August 3, 1918, for the Boston Braves

MLB statistics
- Batting average: .291
- Home runs: 0
- Runs batted in: 18
- Stats at Baseball Reference

Teams
- Boston Braves (1918)

Roy Hardee "Red" Massey (October 9, 1890 – June 23, 1954) was an American Major League Baseball player. He played one season with the Boston Braves in 1918.
