= 1918 Major League Baseball season =

1918 MLB season
- League: American League (AL); National League (NL)
- Sport: Baseball
- Duration: Regular season: April 15 – September 2, 1918 (AL); April 16 – September 2, 1918 (NL); World Series: September 5–11, 1918
- Games: 154 (scheduled); 123–130 (AL); 124–131 (NL)
- Teams: 16 (8 per league)

Pennant winners
- AL champions: Boston Red Sox
- AL runners-up: Cleveland Indians
- NL champions: Chicago Cubs
- NL runners-up: New York Giants

World Series
- Champions: Boston Red Sox
- Runners-up: Chicago Cubs

MLB seasons
- ← 1917 1919 →

Locations of teams for the 1915–1922 American League seasons
American League
Locations of teams for the 1916–1919 National League seasons
National League

The 1918 major league baseball season began on April 15, 1918. The regular season ended earlier than originally scheduled, September 2, because of a reduced schedule due to American participation in World War I. The National League and American League champions were the Chicago Cubs and Boston Red Sox, respectively. The postseason began with Game 1 of the 15th World Series on September 5 and ended with Game 6 on September 11. The Red Sox defeated the Cubs, four games to two, capturing their fifth championship in franchise history, since their previous in 1916. Going into the season, the defending World Series champions were the Chicago White Sox from the 1917 season.

== Schedule ==
=== Scheduled start ===
American League Opening Day took place on April 15 with four American League teams playing, the Philadelphia Athletics at Boston Red Sox, and the New York Yankees at Washington Senators, while National League Opening Day saw all eight teams play the following day. It was the first season since 1906 which saw the two leagues open on different days.

=== Shortened season ===
With World War I ongoing, a "work or fight" mandate was issued by the government, requiring men with non-essential jobs to enlist or take war-related jobs by July 1, or else risk being drafted. Secretary of War Newton D. Baker granted an extension to MLB players through Labor Day, September 2. In early August, MLB clubs decided that the regular season would end at that time. As a result, the number of regular-season games that each team played varied—123 to 130 for AL teams and 124 to 131 for NL teams, including ties—reduced from their original 154-game schedules. The final day of the regular season would see all teams but the Cleveland Indians and St. Louis Browns play. Later in August, Baker granted a further extension to allow for the World Series to be contested; it began on September 5 and ended on September 11. World War I would end two months later, with the Armistice of 11 November 1918.

== Teams ==
League	Team	City	Ballpark	Capacity	Manager
American League	Boston Red Sox	Boston, Massachusetts	Fenway Park	27,000	Ed Barrow
American League	Chicago White Sox	Chicago, Illinois	Comiskey Park	28,000	Pants Rowland
American League	Cleveland Indians	Cleveland, Ohio	Dunn Field	21,414	Lee Fohl
American League	Detroit Tigers	Detroit, Michigan	Navin Field	23,000	Hughie Jennings
American League	New York Yankees	New York, New York	Brush Stadium	36,000	Miller Huggins
American League	Philadelphia Athletics	Philadelphia, Pennsylvania	Shibe Park	23,000	Connie Mack
American League	St. Louis Browns	St. Louis, Missouri	Sportsman's Park	18,000	Fielder Jones
American League	St. Louis Browns	St. Louis, Missouri	Sportsman's Park	18,000	Jimmy Austin
American League	St. Louis Browns	St. Louis, Missouri	Sportsman's Park	18,000	Jimmy Burke
American League	Washington Senators	Washington, D.C.	National Park	27,000	Clark Griffith
National League	Boston Braves	Boston, Massachusetts	Braves Field	40,000	George Stallings
National League	Brooklyn Robins	New York, New York	Ebbets Field	30,000	Wilbert Robinson
National League	Chicago Cubs	Chicago, Illinois	Weeghman Park	15,000	Fred Mitchell
National League	Cincinnati Reds	Cincinnati, Ohio	Redland Field	20,696	Christy Mathewson
National League	Cincinnati Reds	Cincinnati, Ohio	Redland Field	20,696	Heinie Groh
National League	New York Giants	New York, New York	Brush Stadium	36,000	John McGraw
National League	Philadelphia Phillies	Philadelphia, Pennsylvania	National League Park	18,000	Pat Moran
National League	Pittsburgh Pirates	Pittsburgh, Pennsylvania	Forbes Field	25,000	Hugo Bezdek
National League	St. Louis Cardinals	St. Louis, Missouri	Robison Field	21,000	Jack Hendricks

== Standings ==
=== American League ===
American League
Team	W	L	Pct.	GB	Home	Road
Boston Red Sox	75	51	.595	—	49‍–‍21	26‍–‍30
Cleveland Indians	73	54	.575	2½	38‍–‍22	35‍–‍32
Washington Senators	72	56	.562	4	41‍–‍32	31‍–‍24
New York Yankees	60	63	.488	13½	37‍–‍29	23‍–‍34
St. Louis Browns	58	64	.475	15	23‍–‍30	35‍–‍34
Chicago White Sox	57	67	.460	17	30‍–‍26	27‍–‍41
Detroit Tigers	55	71	.437	20	28‍–‍29	27‍–‍42
Philadelphia Athletics	52	76	.406	24	35‍–‍32	17‍–‍44

=== National League ===
National League
Team	W	L	Pct.	GB	Home	Road
Chicago Cubs	84	45	.651	—	49‍–‍25	35‍–‍20
New York Giants	71	53	.573	10½	35‍–‍21	36‍–‍32
Cincinnati Reds	68	60	.531	15½	46‍–‍24	22‍–‍36
Pittsburgh Pirates	65	60	.520	17	42‍–‍28	23‍–‍32
Brooklyn Robins	57	69	.452	25½	33‍–‍21	24‍–‍48
Philadelphia Phillies	55	68	.447	26	27‍–‍29	28‍–‍39
Boston Braves	53	71	.427	28½	23‍–‍29	30‍–‍42
St. Louis Cardinals	51	78	.395	33	32‍–‍40	19‍–‍38

=== Tie games ===
10 tie games (6 in AL, 4 in NL), which are not factored into winning percentage or games behind (and were often replayed again) occurred throughout the season.

==== American League ====
- Cleveland Indians, 2
- Detroit Tigers, 2
- New York Yankees, 3
- Philadelphia Athletics, 2
- St. Louis Browns, 1
- Washington Senators, 2

==== National League ====
- Chicago Cubs, 2
- Cincinnati Reds, 1
- Philadelphia Phillies, 2
- Pittsburgh Pirates, 1
- St. Louis Cardinals, 2

== Postseason ==
The postseason began on September 5 and ended on September 11 with the Boston Red Sox defeating the Chicago Cubs in the 1918 World Series in six games.

=== Bracket ===
World Series
AL	Boston Red Sox	4
NL	Chicago Cubs	2

== Managerial changes ==
=== Off-season ===
Team	Former Manager	New Manager
Boston Red Sox	Jack Barry	Ed Barrow
New York Yankees	Bill Donovan	Miller Huggins
St. Louis Cardinals	Miller Huggins	Jack Hendricks

=== In-season ===
Team	Former Manager	New Manager
Cincinnati Reds	Christy Mathewson	Heinie Groh
St. Louis Browns	Fielder Jones	Jimmy Austin
St. Louis Browns	Jimmy Austin	Jimmy Burke

== League leaders ==
Any team shown in small text indicates a previous team a player was on during the season.

=== American League ===
Hitting leaders
Stat	Player	Total
AVG	Ty Cobb (DET)	.382
OPS	Babe Ruth (BOS)	.966
HR	Babe Ruth (BOS); Tillie Walker (PHA)	11
RBI	Bobby Veach (DET)	84
R	Ray Chapman (CLE)	84
H	George Burns (PHA)	178
SB	George Sisler (SLB)	45

Pitching leaders
Stat	Player	Total
W	Walter Johnson^{1} (WSH)	23
L	Eddie Cicotte (CWS); Scott Perry (PHA)	19
ERA	Walter Johnson^{1} (WSH)	1.27
K	Walter Johnson^{1} (WSH)	162
IP	Scott Perry (PHA)	332.1
SV	George Mogridge (NYY)	7
WHIP	Walter Johnson (WSH)	0.954

^{1} American League Triple Crown pitching winner

=== National League ===
Hitting leaders
Stat	Player	Total
AVG	Zack Wheat (BRO)	.335
OPS	Edd Roush (CIN)	.823
HR	Gavvy Cravath (PHI)	8
RBI	Sherry Magee (CIN)	76
R	Heinie Groh (CIN)	86
H	Charlie Hollocher (CHC)	161
SB	Max Carey (PIT)	58

Pitching leaders
Stat	Player	Total
W	Hippo Vaughn^{2} (CHC)	22
L	Rube Marquard (BRO); Joe Oeschger (PHI)	18
ERA	Hippo Vaughn^{2} (CHC)	1.74
K	Hippo Vaughn^{2} (CHC)	148
IP	Hippo Vaughn (CHC)	290.1
SV	Fred Anderson (NYG); Wilbur Cooper (PIT); Joe Oeschger (PHI); Fred Toney (NYG/CIN)	3
WHIP	Hippo Vaughn (CHC)	1.006

^{2} National League Triple Crown pitching winner

== Milestones ==
=== Batters ===
==== Cycles ====
- Cliff Heathcote (STL):
  - Heathcote hit for his first cycle and fourth in franchise history, on June 13 against the Philadelphia Phillies.

=== Pitchers ===
==== No-hitters ====
- Dutch Leonard (BOS):
  - Dutch threw his second career no-hitter and ninth no-hitter in franchise history, by defeating the Detroit Tigers 5–0 on June 3. Leonard walked one and struck out four.

== Home field attendance ==
Team name	Wins	%±	Home attendance	%±	Per game
Chicago Cubs	84	13.5%	337,256	−6.4%	4,558
Cleveland Indians	73	−17.0%	295,515	−38.1%	4,766
New York Yankees	60	−15.5%	282,047	−14.6%	4,210
New York Giants	71	−27.6%	256,618	−48.7%	4,582
Boston Red Sox	75	−16.7%	249,513	−35.7%	3,564
Pittsburgh Pirates	65	27.5%	213,610	10.8%	3,009
Detroit Tigers	55	−29.5%	203,719	−55.5%	3,512
Chicago White Sox	57	−43.0%	195,081	−71.5%	3,484
Washington Senators	72	−2.7%	182,122	103.1%	2,461
Philadelphia Athletics	52	−5.5%	177,926	−19.6%	2,617
Cincinnati Reds	68	−12.8%	163,009	−39.4%	2,296
Philadelphia Phillies	55	−36.8%	122,266	−65.5%	2,145
St. Louis Browns	58	1.8%	122,076	−42.0%	2,303
St. Louis Cardinals	51	−37.8%	110,599	−61.7%	1,515
Boston Braves	53	−26.4%	84,938	−51.3%	1,633
Brooklyn Robins	57	−18.6%	83,831	−62.2%	1,552

== Venues ==
Robison Field of the St. Louis Cardinals is gradually referred to as Cardinal Field, after Helene Britton, daughter of the deceased former owner Frank Robison, sells her interest in the team following a deal in March 1917, ending the association between the Cardinals and the Robison family. By 1918, Cardinal Field became the name widely used.

== See also ==
- 1918 in baseball (Events, Births, Deaths)
