= 1917 St. Louis Browns season =

Major League Baseball season

1917 St. Louis Browns
- League: American League
- Ballpark: Sportsman's Park
- City: St. Louis, Missouri
- Record: 57–97 (.370)
- League place: 7th
- Owners: Phil Ball
- Managers: Fielder Jones

The 1917 St. Louis Browns season involved the Browns finishing seventh in the American League with a record of 57 wins and 97 losses.

== Regular season ==
=== Season standings ===
American League
Team	W	L	Pct.	GB	Home	Road
Chicago White Sox	100	54	.649	—	56‍–‍21	44‍–‍33
Boston Red Sox	90	62	.592	9	45‍–‍33	45‍–‍29
Cleveland Indians	88	66	.571	12	44‍–‍34	44‍–‍32
Detroit Tigers	78	75	.510	21½	34‍–‍41	44‍–‍34
Washington Senators	74	79	.484	25½	42‍–‍35	32‍–‍44
New York Yankees	71	82	.464	28½	35‍–‍40	36‍–‍42
St. Louis Browns	57	97	.370	43	31‍–‍46	26‍–‍51
Philadelphia Athletics	55	98	.359	44½	29‍–‍47	26‍–‍51

=== Record vs. opponents ===
1917 American League record Sources:
Team	BOS	CWS	CLE	DET	NYY	PHA	SLB	WSH
Boston	—	10–12–1	10–12	9–12	13–9–1	18–3–1	17–5–1	13–9–1
Chicago	12–10–1	—	14–8	16–6	12–10	15–7	16–6	15–7–1
Cleveland	12–10	8–14	—	12–10	15–7	16–6	14–8	11–11–2
Detroit	12–9	6–16	10–12	—	13–9–1	12–10	14–8	11–11
New York	9–13–1	10–12	7–15	9–13–1	—	15–7	13–9	8–13
Philadelphia	3–18–1	7–15	6–16	10–12	7–15	—	11–11	11–11
St. Louis	5–17–1	6–16	8–14	8–14	9–13	11–11	—	10–12
Washington	9–13–1	7–15–1	11–11–2	11–11	13–8	11–11	12–10	—

=== Roster ===
1917 St. Louis Browns
Roster
Pitchers: Dave Davenport; Bob Groom; Earl Hamilton; Ernie Koob; Grover Lowdermilk; Speed Martin; Tim McCabe; Vince Molyneaux; Jim Park; Kewpie Pennington; Eddie Plank; Tom Rogers; Allen Sothoron; Carl Weilman; Rasty Wright	Catchers: George Hale; Grover Hartley; Hank Severeid; Infielders: Jimmy Austin; Wally Gerber; Ernie Johnson; Bill Kenworthy; Doc Lavan; Lee Magee; Scrappy Moore; Ed Murray; Otto Neu; Gene Paulette; Del Pratt; George Sisler	Outfielders: Ray Demmitt; Baby Doll Jacobson; Armando Marsans; Ward Miller; Bill Rumler; Burt Shotton; Tod Sloan; Earl Smith; Other batters: Ivan Bigler; Tom Richardson	Manager: Fielder Jones

== Game log ==
Games legend
Orioles Win	Orioles Loss	Game postponed	Clinched playoff spot	Eliminated from Playoff Race
Boldface text denotes a Browns pitcher

St. Louis Browns 1917 Season Game Log — Season Record: (57–97) – home (31–46) – road (26–51)
April (16–11) – home (7–5) – road (9–6)

#	Date	Opponent	Score	Win	Loss	Save	Stadium	Attendance	Record	Box/ Streak
1	April 11	White Sox	2–7	Scott	Hamilton	Danforth			0–1	
2	April 13	White Sox	3–4	Koob	Faber	Sothoron				–
3	April 14	White Sox	0–11	Cicotte	Hamilton					
4	April 15	Indians								
5	April 17	Indians								
6	April 18	Indians								
7	April 19	White Sox								
8	April 20	White Sox								
9	April 21	White Sox								
10	April 22	White Sox								
11	April 24	Tigers								
13	April 27	Indians								
14	April 28	Indians								

== Player stats ==
=== Batting ===
==== Starters by position ====
Note: Pos = Position; G = Games played; AB = At bats; H = Hits; Avg. = Batting average; HR = Home runs; RBI = Runs batted in

Pos	Player	G	AB	H	Avg.	HR	RBI
C	Hank Severeid	143	501	133	.265	1	57
1B	George Sisler	135	539	190	.353	2	52
2B	Del Pratt	123	450	111	.247	1	53
SS	Doc Lavan	118	355	85	.239	0	30
3B	Jimmy Austin	127	455	109	.240	0	19
OF	Burt Shotton	118	398	89	.224	1	20
OF	Tod Sloan	109	313	72	.230	2	25
OF	Baby Doll Jacobson	148	529	131	.248	4	55

==== Other batters ====
Note: G = Games played; AB = At bats; H = Hits; Avg. = Batting average; HR = Home runs; RBI = Runs batted in

Player	G	AB	H	Avg.	HR	RBI
Armando Marsans	75	257	59	.230	0	20
Ernie Johnson	80	199	49	.246	2	20
Earl Smith	52	199	56	.281	0	10
Lee Magee	36	112	19	.170	0	4
William Rumler	78	88	23	.261	1	16
Ward Miller	43	82	17	.207	1	2
George Hale	38	61	12	.197	0	8
Ray Demmitt	14	53	15	.283	0	7
Wally Gerber	14	39	12	.308	0	2
Gene Paulette	12	22	4	.182	0	0
Grover Hartley	19	13	3	.231	0	0
Bill Kenworthy	5	10	1	.100	0	1
Scrappy Moore	4	8	1	.125	0	0
Ed Murray	1	1	0	.000	0	0
Tom Richardson	1	1	0	.000	0	0
Otto Neu	1	0	0	----	0	0
Ivan Bigler	1	0	0	----	0	0

=== Pitching ===
==== Starting pitchers ====
Note: G = Games pitched; IP = Innings pitched; W = Wins; L = Losses; ERA = Earned run average; SO = Strikeouts

Player	G	IP	W	L	ERA	SO
Dave Davenport	47	280.2	17	17	3.08	100
Allan Sothoron	48	276.2	14	19	2.83	85
Bob Groom	38	232.2	8	19	2.94	82
Eddie Plank	20	131.0	5	6	1.79	26

==== Other pitchers ====
Note: G = Games pitched; IP = Innings pitched; W = Wins; L = Losses; ERA = Earned run average; SO = Strikeouts

Player	G	IP	W	L	ERA	SO
Ernie Koob	39	133.2	6	14	3.91	47
Tom Rogers	24	108.2	3	6	3.89	27
Earl Hamilton	27	83.0	0	9	3.14	19
Carl Weilman	5	19.0	1	2	1.89	9
Grover Lowdermilk	3	19.0	2	1	1.42	9
Speed Martin	9	15.2	0	2	5.74	5

==== Relief pitchers ====
Note: G = Games pitched; W = Wins; L = Losses; SV = Saves; ERA = Earned run average; SO = Strikeouts

Player	G	W	L	SV	ERA	SO
Rasty Wright	16	0	1	0	5.45	5
Jim Park	13	1	1	0	6.64	9
Vince Molyneaux	7	0	0	0	4.91	4
Tim McCabe	1	0	0	0	23.14	2
Kewpie Pennington	1	0	0	0	0.00	0
