= 1917 Chicago White Sox season =

1917 Chicago White Sox
- World Series champions American League champions
- League: American League
- Ballpark: Comiskey Park
- City: Chicago, Illinois
- Record: 100–54 (.649)
- League place: 1st
- Owners: Charles Comiskey
- Managers: Pants Rowland

The 1917 Chicago White Sox dominated the American League with a record of 100–54. The 100 wins is a club record that still stands. Their offense was first in runs scored while their pitching staff led the league with a 2.16 ERA.

Facing the New York Giants in the 1917 World Series, the team clinched the series in six games, thanks in large part to the workhorse efforts of Eddie Cicotte and Red Faber. It would be the team's last world championship until 2005.

== Regular season ==
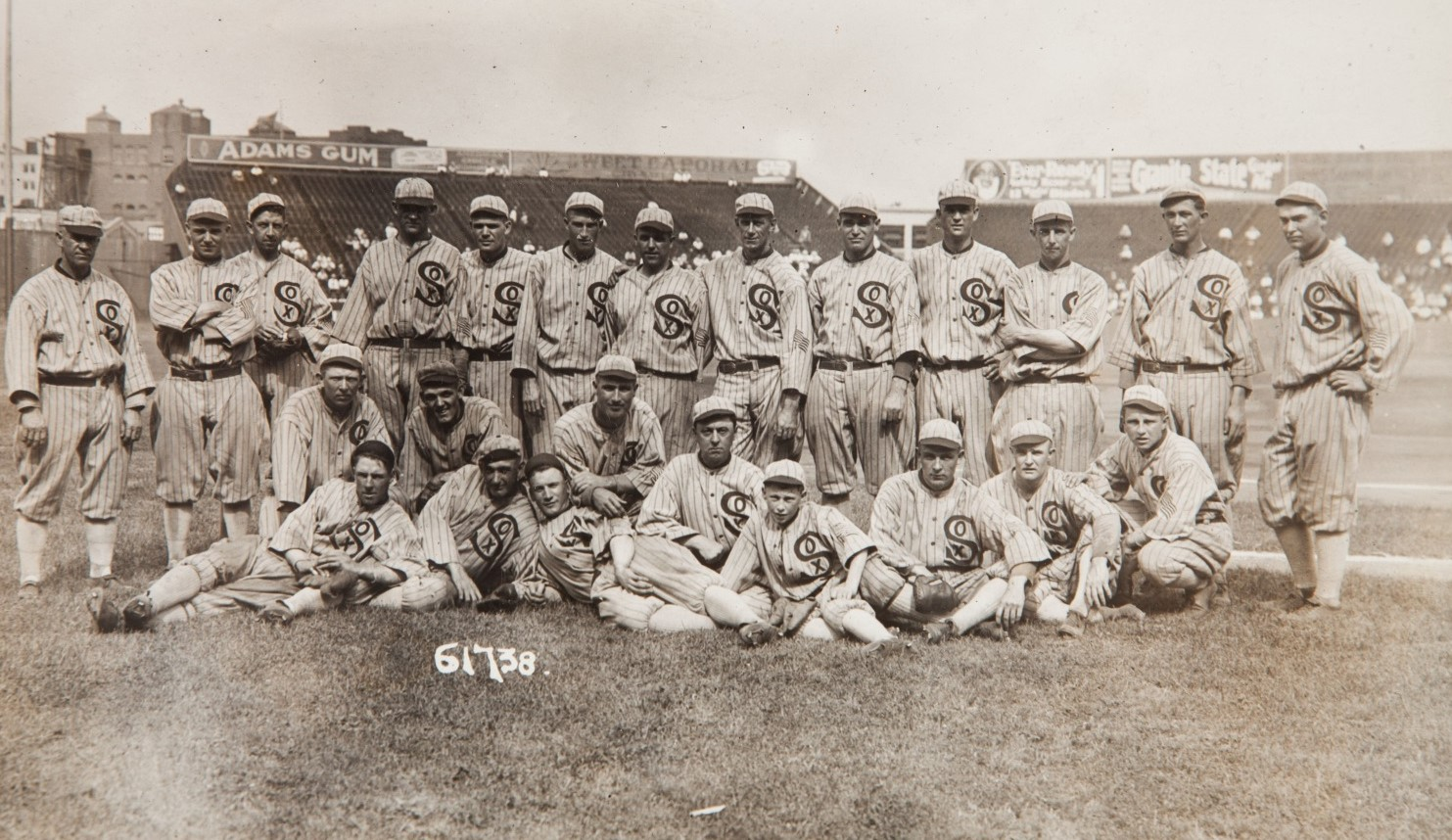
1917 Chicago White Sox

=== Season standings ===
American League
Team	W	L	Pct.	GB	Home	Road
Chicago White Sox	100	54	.649	—	56‍–‍21	44‍–‍33
Boston Red Sox	90	62	.592	9	45‍–‍33	45‍–‍29
Cleveland Indians	88	66	.571	12	44‍–‍34	44‍–‍32
Detroit Tigers	78	75	.510	21½	34‍–‍41	44‍–‍34
Washington Senators	74	79	.484	25½	42‍–‍35	32‍–‍44
New York Yankees	71	82	.464	28½	35‍–‍40	36‍–‍42
St. Louis Browns	57	97	.370	43	31‍–‍46	26‍–‍51
Philadelphia Athletics	55	98	.359	44½	29‍–‍47	26‍–‍51

=== Record vs. opponents ===
1917 American League record Sources:
Team	BOS	CWS	CLE	DET	NYY	PHA	SLB	WSH
Boston	—	10–12–1	10–12	9–12	13–9–1	18–3–1	17–5–1	13–9–1
Chicago	12–10–1	—	14–8	16–6	12–10	15–7	16–6	15–7–1
Cleveland	12–10	8–14	—	12–10	15–7	16–6	14–8	11–11–2
Detroit	12–9	6–16	10–12	—	13–9–1	12–10	14–8	11–11
New York	9–13–1	10–12	7–15	9–13–1	—	15–7	13–9	8–13
Philadelphia	3–18–1	7–15	6–16	10–12	7–15	—	11–11	11–11
St. Louis	5–17–1	6–16	8–14	8–14	9–13	11–11	—	10–12
Washington	9–13–1	7–15–1	11–11–2	11–11	13–8	11–11	12–10	—

== Game log ==
Legend
	White Sox win
	White Sox loss
	Postponement
**Bold**	White Sox team member

1917 White Sox game log
April (9–7) – home (4–6) – road (0–6) – 0 R.S. 0 R.A.

#	Date	Opponent	Score	Win	Loss	Save	Attendance	Time	Record	GB	Box/Streak
1	April 11	@ Browns	7–2	Scott	@ Hamilton	Danforth	18,000	1.57	1–0		
2	April 13	@ Browns	3–4	Koob	Faber	Sothoron	1,000	2:11	1–1	–	
3	April 14	@ Browns	11–0	Cicotte	Hamilton		10,000	2:02	2–1		
4	April 15	@ Tigers	6–2	Scott	Covelski		15,473	1:35			
5	April 16	@ Tigers	4–0	Faber	Jones		5,200	1:41	3–1	–	
6	April 17	@ Tigers	4–2	Danforth	Ehmke	Russel	3,353	1:50		–	
7	April 19	Indians	2–6	Plank	Scott		28,000	1:58			
8	April 20	Browns	5–2	Cicotte	Sothoron		6,000	1:48			
9	April 21	Browns	2–0	Faber	Koob		14,000	2,000			
10	April 22	Browns	3–2	Williams	Groom		25,000	1:59			
11	April 24	Indians	1–0	Scott	Coveleski		5,000	1:43			
12	April 25	Indians	1–4	Coumbe	Cicotte		1,000	1:47			
13	April 26	Indians	0–3	Bagby	Faber		2,500	1:48			
14	April 27	Indians	1–2	Klepfer	Scott	Covelski	4,000	2:02			
15	April 28	Tigers	3–8	Faber	Jones		4,200	2:36			
16	April 29	Tigers	0–3	Mitchell	Faber		12,000	1:42			

== Roster ==
1917 Chicago White Sox
Roster
Pitchers: Joe Benz; Eddie Cicotte; Dave Danforth; Red Faber; Reb Russell; Jim Scott; Lefty Williams; Mellie Wolfgang	Catchers: Joe Jenkins; Byrd Lynn; Ray Schalk; Infielders: Bobby Byrne; Eddie Collins; Chick Gandil; Ziggy Hasbrook; Ted Jourdan; Fred McMullin; Swede Risberg; Zeb Terry; Buck Weaver	Outfielders: Shano Collins; Happy Felsch; Joe Jackson; Nemo Leibold; Eddie Murphy; Other positions: Jack Fournier	Manager: Pants Rowland; Coaches: Kid Gleason

== Player stats ==
=== Batting ===
==== Starters by position ====
Note: Pos = Position; G = Games played; AB = At bats; H = Hits; Avg. = Batting average; HR = Home runs; RBI = Runs batted in

Pos	Player	G	AB	H	Avg.	HR	RBI
C	Ray Schalk	140	424	96	.226	2	51
1B	Chick Gandil	149	553	151	.273	0	57
2B	Eddie Collins	156	564	163	.289	0	67
3B	Buck Weaver	118	447	127	.284	3	32
SS	Swede Risberg	149	474	96	.203	1	45
LF	Joe Jackson	146	538	162	.301	5	75
CF	Happy Felsch	152	575	177	.308	6	102
RF	Nemo Leibold	125	428	101	.236	0	29

==== Other batters ====
Note: G = Games played; AB = At bats; H = Hits; Avg. = Batting average; HR = Home runs; RBI = Runs batted in

Player	G	AB	H	Avg.	HR	RBI
Shano Collins	82	252	59	.234	1	13
Fred McMullin	59	194	46	.237	0	12
Byrd Lynn	35	72	16	.222	0	7
Eddie Murphy	53	51	16	.314	0	16
Ted Jourdan	17	34	5	.147	0	2
Joe Jenkins	10	9	1	.111	0	3
Zeb Terry	2	1	0	.000	0	0
Jack Fournier	1	1	0	.000	0	0
Bobby Byrne	1	1	0	.000	0	0
Ziggy Hasbrook	2	1	0	.000	0	0

=== Pitching ===
==== Starting pitchers ====
Note: G = Games pitched; IP = Innings pitched; W = Wins; L = Losses; ERA = Earned run average; SO = Strikeouts

Player	G	IP	W	L	ERA	SO
Eddie Cicotte	49	346.2	28	12	1.53	150
Red Faber	41	248.0	16	13	1.92	84
Reb Russell	35	189.1	15	5	1.95	54
Joe Benz	19	94.2	7	3	2.47	25

==== Other pitchers ====
Note: G = Games pitched; IP = Innings pitched; W = Wins; L = Losses; ERA = Earned run average; SO = Strikeouts

Player	G	IP	W	L	ERA	SO
Lefty Williams	45	230.0	17	8	2.97	85
Jim Scott	24	125.0	6	7	1.87	37

==== Relief pitchers ====
Note: G = Games pitched; W = Wins; L = Losses; SV = Saves; ERA = Earned run average; SO = Strikeouts

Player	G	W	L	SV	ERA	SO
Dave Danforth	50	11	6	9	2.65	79
Mellie Wolfgang	5	0	0	0	5.09	3

== Awards and honors ==
=== League top five finishers ===
Eddie Cicotte

- #1 in AL in wins (28)
- #1 in AL in earned run average (1.53)
- #2 in AL in strikeouts (150)

Happy Felsch

- #2 in AL in runs batted in (102)

== 1917 World Series ==
There were accusations of this series not being completely "on the level," especially after the Black Sox Scandal of 1919. The most notable play involved Heinie Zimmerman of the Giants chasing Eddie Collins across home plate in the deciding game. Zimmerman was later banned from organized baseball for throwing games.

AL Chicago White Sox (4) vs. NL New York Giants (2)

Game	Score	Date	Location	Attendance
1	New York Giants – 1, Chicago White Sox – 2	October 6	Comiskey Park	32,000
2	New York Giants – 2, Chicago White Sox – 7	October 7	Comiskey Park	32,000
3	Chicago White Sox – 0, New York Giants – 2	October 10	Polo Grounds	33,616
4	Chicago White Sox – 0, New York Giants – 5	October 11	Polo Grounds	27,746
5	New York Giants – 5, Chicago White Sox – 8	October 13	Comiskey Park	27,323
6	Chicago White Sox – 4, New York Giants – 2	October 15	Polo Grounds	33,969
