= Ivan Bigler =

American baseball player (1892–1975)

- Pinch runner
- Born: December 13, 1892; Bradford, Ohio, U.S.
- Died: April 1, 1975 (aged 82); Coldwater, Michigan, U.S.
- Batted: Right Threw: Right

MLB debut
- May 6, 1917, for the St. Louis Browns

Last MLB appearance
- May 6, 1917, for the St. Louis Browns

MLB statistics
- Games played: 1
- At bats: 0
- Hits: 0
- Stats at Baseball Reference

Teams
- St. Louis Browns (1917)

Ivan Edward "Pete" Bigler (December 13, 1892 – April 1, 1975) was an American Major League Baseball player. Bigler appeared for the St. Louis Browns in one game on May 6, 1917 as a pinch runner. In the minor leagues he played outfield and third base. He attended Juniata College and Springfield College. He is a member of the Worcester Polytechnic Institute Athletic Hall of Fame.

== Baseball career ==
After graduating from Juniata, Bigler began the early summer of 1912 catching for the Huntingdon Collegians, where his play drew the attention of Earle Mack, then with the Reading Pretzels of the Tri-State League. On his son's recommendation, Philadelphia A's manager Connie Mack sent Bigler to work out with the Reading club for the remainder of the season. He began his professional baseball career with the Utica Utes of the New York State League in 1913 playing the outfield.

During the 1913–14 off-season, Bigler returned to Juniata and managed the Eagles basketball squad. In 1914 he was back with Utica for a brief tryout, drew another release, and spent the remainder of the year playing semi-pro ball. In 1915, he signed with the Gettysburg Patriots of the new Blue Ridge League. He had the best season of his professional career with a season batting average of .283 and 38 stolen bases while playing third base. He was also named to the Blue Ridge League End of Season All-Star team in 1915. He once again played with Gettysburg in 1916. In the off-season, he attended Springfield College, where he would earn a master's degree in physical education, playing for their basketball team.

On September 15, 1916, Bigler was picked up by the St. Louis Browns in the Rule 5 draft. He began the season as a backup third baseman to Jimmy Austin. On May 6, 1917, Bigler made his one and only appearance in a major league game in the seventh inning. He became a pinch runner for pinch hitter Bill Rumler, who had pinch hit for relief pitcher Eddie Plank. He was left on base and was replaced in the lineup by relief pitcher Bob Groom. After his one appearance, he remained on the Browns roster until early May, when he was released to Wichita of the Western League. After playing in just eight games from May 12 through May 20 and batting .111 (4-for-36), he was returned to St. Louis. However, he did not get into another game. Bigler was not the only player to have a one-game career for the Browns in 1917. Tom Richardson, Ed Murray, Otto Neu, and Kewpie Pennington joined him on the list.

In June 1917, Bigler played with the Chambersburg Maroons. The Maroons moved to Cumberland, Maryland on June 30, becoming the Cumberland Colts. He played third base in 44 games, with a batting average of .250. This was his last professional appearance.

== Military service and coaching career ==
Bigler joined the United States Marine Corps in the fall of 1917, serving until November 1919. He was honorably discharged with the rank of captain and later served in the Marine Corps Reserve as commanding officer of the 308th Company, which won the Efficiency Trophy at the rifle range in 1930). He then accepted a job in 1921 at Worcester Polytechnic Institute (WPI) as an assistant coach in basketball, baseball and football. He also played semi-pro baseball in the New England Blackstone Valley League for several years. In 1922, he married his wife Helen. The marriage produced an only child, Edwin, in 1925.

Bigler served as WPI Engineers' football head coach from 1923 to 1940 and head basketball coach from 1922 to 1942. As a football coach his record was 42–62–10. His best season in football was 1938, when he led the team to its first undefeated season in school history. As a basketball coach, he had ten winning seasons and 151 victories. His best basketball record was in 1938–39, when his team had a record of 13–3. For his efforts at WPI, he was inducted posthumously into the WPI Athletic Hall of Fame in 1984. Part of the induction citation read: "His drive and commitment to athletics was always evident, but the critical ability to help student-athletes attain their maximum potential – both in the classroom and on the playing field – was always a driving force."

== Later life ==
After retiring from WPI, Bigler joined the Wyman-Gordon Company in Worcester, a manufacturer of industrial products, including iron and steel forgings, seamless steel pipes, and aircraft parts and equipment. He held positions in production and count control, and outside the plant, managed the Wyman-Gordon baseball team to Industrial League and city championships. Bigler retired from the company in 1958, and moved to Coldwater, Michigan.

Bigler was 82 years old when he died in Coldwater on April 1, 1975, after a short illness. He was buried in the Church of the Brethren's Harris Creek Cemetery in Bradford, Ohio.
