= 1917 Philadelphia Athletics season =

1917 Philadelphia Athletics
- League: American League
- Ballpark: Shibe Park
- City: Philadelphia
- Record: 55–98 (.359)
- League place: 8th
- Owners: Connie Mack, Benjamin Shibe, Tom Shibe, and John Shibe
- Managers: Connie Mack

The 1917 Philadelphia Athletics season involved the A's finishing 8th place in the American League. with a record of 55 wins and 98 losses.

== Regular season ==
=== Season standings ===
American League
Team	W	L	Pct.	GB	Home	Road
Chicago White Sox	100	54	.649	—	56‍–‍21	44‍–‍33
Boston Red Sox	90	62	.592	9	45‍–‍33	45‍–‍29
Cleveland Indians	88	66	.571	12	44‍–‍34	44‍–‍32
Detroit Tigers	78	75	.510	21½	34‍–‍41	44‍–‍34
Washington Senators	74	79	.484	25½	42‍–‍35	32‍–‍44
New York Yankees	71	82	.464	28½	35‍–‍40	36‍–‍42
St. Louis Browns	57	97	.370	43	31‍–‍46	26‍–‍51
Philadelphia Athletics	55	98	.359	44½	29‍–‍47	26‍–‍51

=== Record vs. opponents ===
1917 American League record Sources:
Team	BOS	CWS	CLE	DET	NYY	PHA	SLB	WSH
Boston	—	10–12–1	10–12	9–12	13–9–1	18–3–1	17–5–1	13–9–1
Chicago	12–10–1	—	14–8	16–6	12–10	15–7	16–6	15–7–1
Cleveland	12–10	8–14	—	12–10	15–7	16–6	14–8	11–11–2
Detroit	12–9	6–16	10–12	—	13–9–1	12–10	14–8	11–11
New York	9–13–1	10–12	7–15	9–13–1	—	15–7	13–9	8–13
Philadelphia	3–18–1	7–15	6–16	10–12	7–15	—	11–11	11–11
St. Louis	5–17–1	6–16	8–14	8–14	9–13	11–11	—	10–12
Washington	9–13–1	7–15–1	11–11–2	11–11	13–8	11–11	12–10	—

=== Roster ===
1917 Philadelphia Athletics
Roster
Pitchers: Walter Anderson; Eddie Bacon; Bullet Joe Bush; Cy Falkenberg; Cliff Hill; Ellis Johnson; Jing Johnson; Dave Keefe; Elmer Myers; Jack Nabors; Rollie Naylor; Win Noyes; Rube Parnham; Rube Schauer; Socks Seibold	Catchers: Raymond Haley; Wickey McAvoy; Billy Meyer; Cy Perkins; Val Picinich; Wally Schang; Infielders: Ray Bates; Dallas Bradshaw; Joe Dugan; Pug Griffin; Roy Grover; Otis Lawry; Stuffy McInnis; Eddie Palmer; Red Shannon; Whitey Witt	Outfielders: Gene Bailey; Ping Bodie; Pat French; Lee Gooch; Charlie Jamieson; Bill Johnson; Ralph Sharman; Amos Strunk; Buck Thrasher; Other batters: Harry Davis	Manager: Connie Mack

== Player stats ==
=== Batting ===
==== Starters by position ====
Note: Pos = Position; G = Games played; AB = At bats; H = Hits; Avg. = Batting average; HR = Home runs; RBI = Runs batted in

Pos	Player	G	AB	H	Avg.	HR	RBI
C	Wally Schang	118	316	90	.285	3	36
1B	Stuffy McInnis	150	567	172	.303	0	44
2B	Roy Grover	141	482	108	.224	0	34
SS	Whitey Witt	128	452	114	.252	0	28
3B	Ray Bates	127	485	115	.237	2	66
OF	Ping Bodie	148	557	162	.291	7	74
OF	Amos Strunk	148	540	152	.281	1	45
OF	Charlie Jamieson	85	345	92	.267	0	27

==== Other batters ====
Note: G = Games played; AB = At bats; H = Hits; Avg. = Batting average; HR = Home runs; RBI = Runs batted in

Player	G	AB	H	Avg.	HR	RBI
Billy Meyer	62	162	38	.235	0	9
Joe Dugan	43	134	26	.194	0	16
Bill Johnson	48	109	19	.174	1	8
Raymond Haley	41	98	27	.276	0	11
Buck Thrasher	23	77	18	.234	0	2
Lee Gooch	17	59	17	.288	1	8
Otis Lawry	30	55	9	.164	0	1
Eddie Palmer	16	52	11	.212	0	5
Ralph Sharman	13	37	11	.297	0	2
Red Shannon	11	35	10	.286	0	7
Pug Griffin	18	25	5	.200	1	3
Wickey McAvoy	10	24	6	.250	1	4
Cy Perkins	6	18	3	.167	0	2
Gene Bailey	5	12	1	.083	0	0
Val Picinich	2	6	2	.333	0	0
Dallas Bradshaw	2	4	0	.000	0	0
Pat French	3	2	0	.000	0	0
Harry Davis	1	1	0	.000	0	0

=== Pitching ===
==== Starting pitchers ====
Note: G = Games pitched; IP = Innings pitched; W = Wins; L = Losses; ERA = Earned run average; SO = Strikeouts

Player	G	IP	W	L	ERA	SO
Bullet Joe Bush	37	233.1	11	17	2.47	121
Rube Schauer	33	215.0	7	16	3.14	62
Elmer Myers	38	201.2	9	16	4.42	88
Jing Johnson	34	191.0	9	12	2.78	55
Win Noyes	27	171.0	10	10	2.95	64
Rube Parnham	2	11.0	0	1	4.09	4

==== Other pitchers ====
Note: G = Games pitched; IP = Innings pitched; W = Wins; L = Losses; ERA = Earned run average; SO = Strikeouts

Player	G	IP	W	L	ERA	SO
Socks Seibold	33	160.0	4	16	3.94	55
Cy Falkenberg	15	80.2	2	6	3.35	35
Ellis Johnson	4	13.2	0	2	7.24	8

==== Relief pitchers ====
Note: G = Games pitched; W = Wins; L = Losses; SV = Saves; ERA = Earned run average; SO = Strikeouts

Player	G	W	L	SV	ERA	SO
Walter Anderson	14	0	0	0	3.03	10
Dave Keefe	3	1	0	0	1.80	1
Jack Nabors	2	0	0	0	3.00	2
Eddie Bacon	1	0	0	0	6.00	0
Cliff Hill	1	0	0	0	6.75	0
