= Charlie Root =

American baseball player (1899–1970)

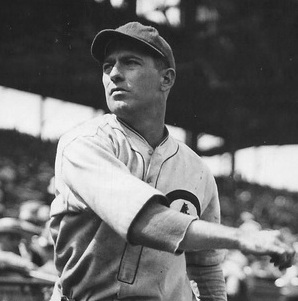
- Root, circa 1928
- Pitcher
- Born: March 17, 1899; Middletown, Ohio, U.S.
- Died: November 5, 1970 (aged 71); Hollister, California, U.S.
- Batted: Right Threw: Right

MLB debut
- April 18, 1923, for the St. Louis Browns

Last MLB appearance
- September 2, 1941, for the Chicago Cubs

MLB statistics
- Win–loss record: 201–160
- Earned run average: 3.59
- Strikeouts: 1,459
- Stats at Baseball Reference

Teams
- St. Louis Browns (1923); Chicago Cubs (1926–1941)

Career highlights and awards
- World Series champion (1957); NL wins leader (1927); Chicago Cubs Hall of Fame

Charles Henry "Chinski" Root (March 17, 1899 – November 5, 1970) was an American Major League Baseball pitcher with the St. Louis Browns and the Chicago Cubs between 1923 and 1941. Root batted and threw right-handed. He holds the club record for games, innings pitched, and career wins with 201. He is the last player born in the 19th Century to play in Major League Baseball.

== Early life ==
Born on Saint Patrick's Day, Root was the eighth of nine children born to Jacob and Mary Root in Middletown, Ohio. He left school at 13 due to being reprimanded by his teacher for his behavior. His father envisioned his son working in the local steel mill; although he did not get in his son's interest in baseball, he demanded that his son find a job to help the family. Root had numerous jobs, such as driver of a grocery wagon, working in a box factory, and being a pattern-maker at the Armco mill. By the time he was twenty, he was playing semipro ball with the Middletown Eagles, making $5 for each game ($93 in current dollar terms) on Sundays before leaving for the Hamilton Engine Works, who offered $35 a game ($650 in current dollar terms) and a job for $50 a week ($929 in current dollar terms). Carl Weilman of the St. Louis Browns noticed his play (in which he led them to the Southern Ohio industrial league championship) and signed him to a contract. Root reported to spring training camp for the Browns in Bogalusa, Louisiana in 1921.

== Career ==
Root began his professional career on April 18, 1923, with the St. Louis Browns. Root pitched in relief for the final inning against the Detroit Tigers, striking out one while allowing no hits. Root made his first career start on July 4 for the second game of a double-header against the Chicago White Sox. He lasted two innings while allowing two runs on five hits with one strikeout, receiving the loss as the White Sox prevailed 3–1. He would start just one more game that year while appearing in 27 total games, finishing 15 of them while having 60 innings of work, going 0–4 with a 5.70 ERA. He had 27 strikeouts and 18 walks.

Root was traded after the 1923 season by manager George Sisler along Cedric Durst, Rasty Wright, and Josh Billings to the Los Angeles Angels in the Pacific Coast League for George Lyons and Tony Rego. In his season with the Angels, he won 21 games in 322 innings. His contract was purchased by the Cubs after the season for $30,000 and two players. He was sent back to the Angels for more seasoning after spring training with the team, winning 25 games with the Angels. In 1926, he began play with the Cubs. In 42 games for the team (starting in 32 of them), he went 18–17 while throwing 21 complete games with two saves and two shutouts in 271 1/3 innings of work. He had 62 walks and 127 strikeouts, beginning six consecutive seasons with over a hundred strikeouts. He finished 16th in the MVP voting that year.

For 1927, Root was selected to pitch the Opening Day game for the Cubs, pitching against the St. Louis Cardinals at Wrigley Field, facing future Hall of Fame inductee Grover Cleveland Alexander. Root pitched a complete game while allowing one run on seven hits while having seven strikeouts and five walks as the Cubs rolled over the Cardinals 10–1. That year, he went 26–15 with a 3.76 ERA in 48 games and 309 innings, both career highs. Although he allowed 117 walks, he had 145 strikeouts in the 1,316 batters he faced, all career highs. Fielding-wise, he had six putouts, 49 assists, two errors and two double plays for a .965 fielding percentage. He led the league in wins, games, and innings while finishing in the top ten in hits per 9 innings (8.621, 6th), strikeouts per 9 innings (4.223, 5th), strikeouts (2nd) and shutouts (4, 2nd). Root finished fourth in the MVP voting that year, receiving 46 vote points as Paul Waner received the award with 72. He regressed the following year, going 14–18 with a 3.57 ERA and two saves in 40 games and 237 innings pitched. He had 73 walks with 122 strikeouts.

In 1929, Root pitched in 43 games and 272 innings while having a 19–6 record and a 3.47 ERA. He had 83 walks along with 124 strikeouts. That year the Cubs won the National League pennant, and Root started Game 1 and Game 4 of the World Series against the Philadelphia Athletics. In the first game, he faced off against Howard Ehmke. Root was scoreless until the seventh inning, where Jimmie Foxx hit a home run off him to give the Athletics their first run. Root was replaced by Guy Bush for the eighth inning, but Root (seven innings, three hits) was charged with the 3–1 loss. Root started the pivotal fourth game of the Series, facing off against Jack Quinn. He was clean of runs until the seventh inning, where he was taken out for Art Nehf after getting only one out on six runs as the Cubs tried to preserve a 8–6 lead. However, the two following Cubs pitchers allowed four runs to score as the A's completed their comeback and ultimately won the game 10–8 along with the Series a game later.

Root played mostly to form for 1932. It was the first year the Cubs wore numbers on their jerseys; Root wore 12 (he would wear three different jersey numbers over the following years). In 39 games appeared, he went 15–10 with a 3.58 ERA and three saves in 216 1/3 innings pitched. He had 96 strikeouts with 55 walks (both being lows for Root in his career thus far). The team rallied from a sluggish 53–46 record under Rogers Hornsby to winning 37 of the next 55 games under Charlie Grimm to win the NL pennant. Root appeared in Game 3 of the World Series on October 1 against the New York Yankees. In 4 1/3 innings, he allowed six hits and runs as the Cubs lost 7–5. He threw the pitch that Babe Ruth allegedly predicted he would hit into the seats in the 1932 World Series at Wrigley Field in Chicago (see: Babe Ruth's called shot). Root, however, insisted that Ruth had not pointed to the bleachers and the account of the supposed shot is disputed.

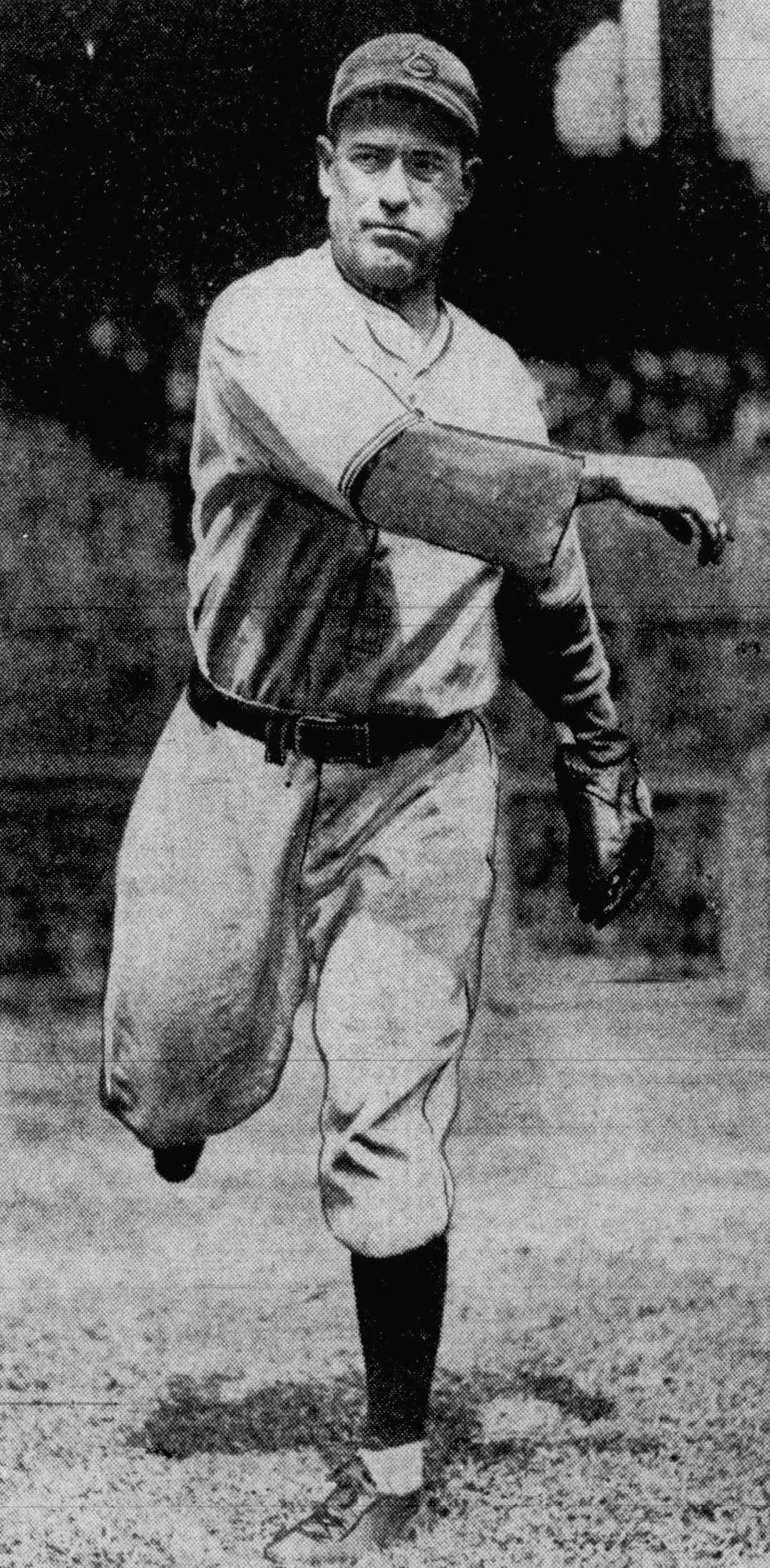
Root, circa 1941

Root's baseball nickname, "Chinski," was bestowed by his longtime teammate and manager, Charlie Grimm. Root, wearing No. 17 (for which he would wear for the remaining years of his career) returned to form in 1935, going 15–8 with a 3.08 ERA in 38 games and 201 1/3 innings pitched. He had 94 strikeouts and 47 walks. The Cubs memorably won the league pennant that season, winning 21 consecutive games from September 4 to the 28th to finish 100–54 and win their third pennant in six years. Root appeared in Game 2 and 4 of the World Series, starting in the former while closing the last two innings of the latter. In Game 2, he was knocked out of the game before finishing an inning, allowing four hits and four runs on four batters faced as the Cubs lost 8–3, with Root being charged with the loss. In Game 4, he threw the eighth and ninth inning, allowing one hit with no runs, two strikeouts, and one walk although the Cubs lost 2–1; the team lost the Series two days later.

Root did not have as much as success in 1938. He appeared in 44 games while starting 11 of them and finishing 20 of them, having 9 saves while going 8–7 with a 2.86 ERA and pitching 160 2/3 innings. He had 70 strikeouts and 30 walks. For the fourth time in nine years, the Cubs rallied to win the league pennant, rallying behind player-manager Gabby Hartnett. On September 28, the Cubs played the Pittsburgh Pirates for possession of first place in the standings, trailing by half a game. Root stepped in for Bill Lee in the ninth inning, allowing one hit with no runs to keep the score at 5 even in the last scheduled inning to play before darkness was set to hit Wrigley Field, which would mean a re-playing of the game the following day. In the bottom of the inning, with two outs, Hartnett hit a dramatic home run to win the game for the team and elevate them to first place in the league (with Root receiving credit for the win). Four days later, the Cubs clinched the pennant. In the World Series that year, he appeared in the fourth and final game against the Yankees, pitching the fourth, fifth, and sixth inning. He allowed three hits with one run (a home run to Tommy Henrich) as the Cubs lost 8–3. In six postseason starts spread out over nine years, Root pitched a total of 22 2/3 innings while allowing 26 hits, 18 runs with 15 strikeouts and six walks while losing three of the decisions and winning none.

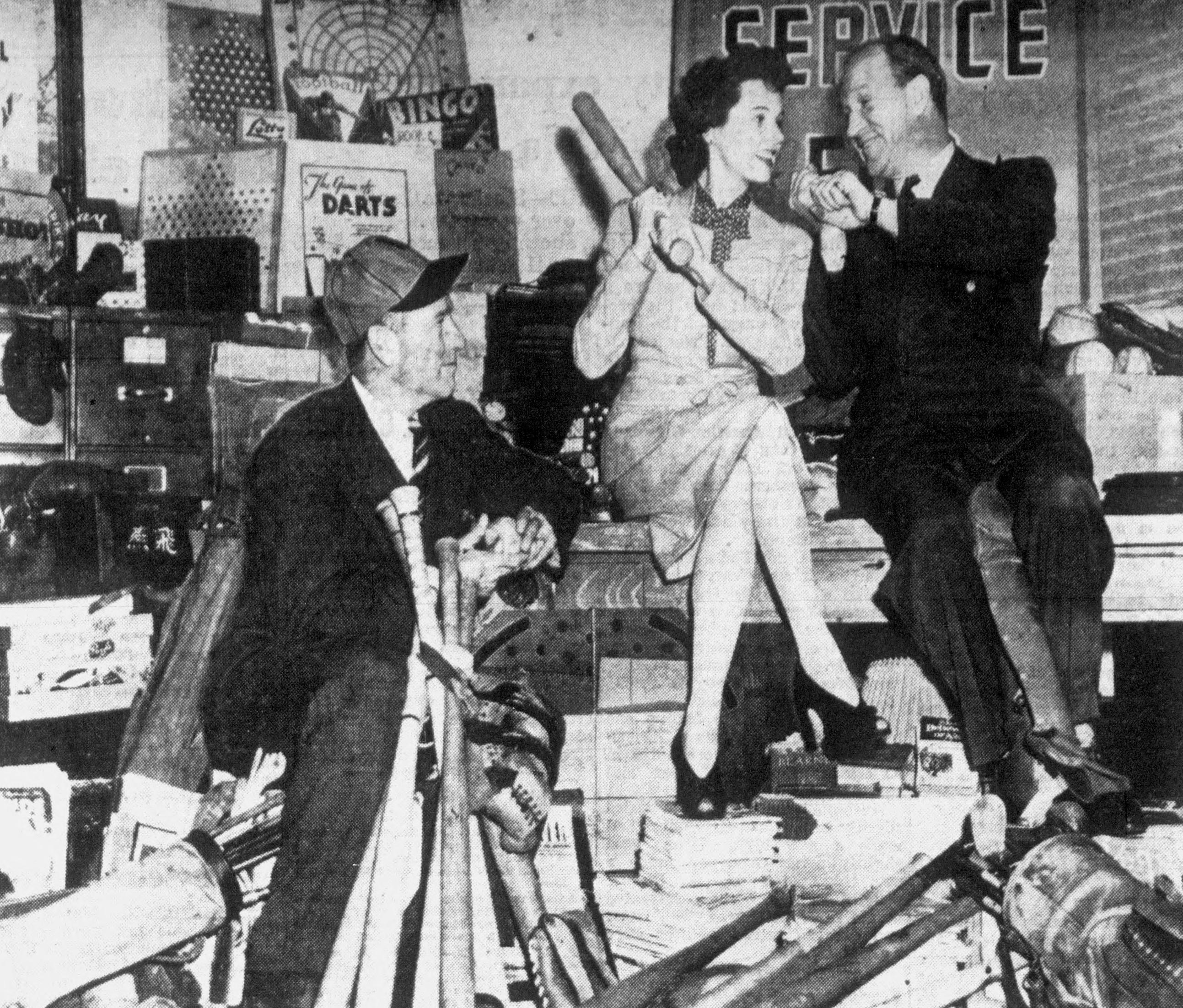
(L-R): Hollywood Stars manager Charlie Root, actress Jane Wyatt and Los Angeles Angels manager Bill Sweeney sit atop a pile of baseball equipment donated to members of the United States Armed Forces at military installations in Southern California in 1943

For his final year in 1941, Root went 8–7 with a 5.40 ERA (a career high) while pitching in 19 games, having six complete games in 106 2/3 innings of work. He allowed more hits and runs than the year before despite a reduced workload while having 46 strikeouts and 37 walks. In his final game on September 2, 1941, he pitched a complete game against the Cincinnati Reds, allowing one run on five hits while striking out and walking five batters in a 3–1 win.

Relative to his pitching counterparts, Root put up stellar stats at the plate during his 17-year major league career, compiling a .180 batting average (196-for-1086) with 86 runs, 11 home runs and 93 RBI. He also provided a sound presence on the defensive side, recording a .976 fielding percentage, which was 15 points higher than the league average at that position.

As quoted by Baseball Legends: The Charlie Root Story, by Joseph E. Bennett, Jan. 1995 Knight Templar magazine "Root was one of the fiercest competitors the game ever knew... his cigar-chomping, no-nonsense visage was one of the most intimidating tools in his baseball arsenal."

== Post-career ==
Root also had a long post-playing career as a manager in minor league baseball and pitching coach, serving in the latter role for the Cubs (1951–53; 1960) and Milwaukee Braves (1956–57). He was a coach on Milwaukee's 1957 World Series champions.

Root, who had a Diamond-R Ranch of 1,000 acres in Paicines, California, became a cattle rancher who liked hunting and fishing.

== Death ==
Root died at age 71 in Hollister, California, after an extended illness. His ashes were scattered at Garden of Memories Memorial Park in Salinas, California.

== See also ==
- List of Major League Baseball annual wins leaders
- List of Major League Baseball career wins leaders

Preceded by Ossie Vitt	Hollywood Stars manager 1943–1944	Succeeded by Buck Fausett
Preceded by Ken Penner	Columbus Red Birds manager 1945–1946	Succeeded by Hal Anderson
Preceded by Roy Johnson; Fred Fitzsimmons	Chicago Cubs pitching coach 1951–1953; 1960 (April 12 – May 4)	Succeeded by Dutch Leonard; Vedie Himsl
Preceded by Bucky Walters	Milwaukee Braves pitching coach 1956–1957	Succeeded by Whit Wyatt
