= 1917 Washington Senators season =

1917 Washington Senators
- League: American League
- Ballpark: National Park
- City: Washington, D.C.
- Record: 74–79 (.484)
- League place: 5th
- Owners: Thomas C. Noyes
- Managers: Clark Griffith

The 1917 Washington Senators won 74 games, lost 79, and finished in fifth place in the American League. They were managed by Clark Griffith and played home games at National Park.

The Senators this season hit only four home runs for the entire campaign, second only to the 1908 Chicago White Sox in the modern era, who hit three. First baseman Joe Judge accounted for 50% of them, with two home runs for the season.

== Regular season ==
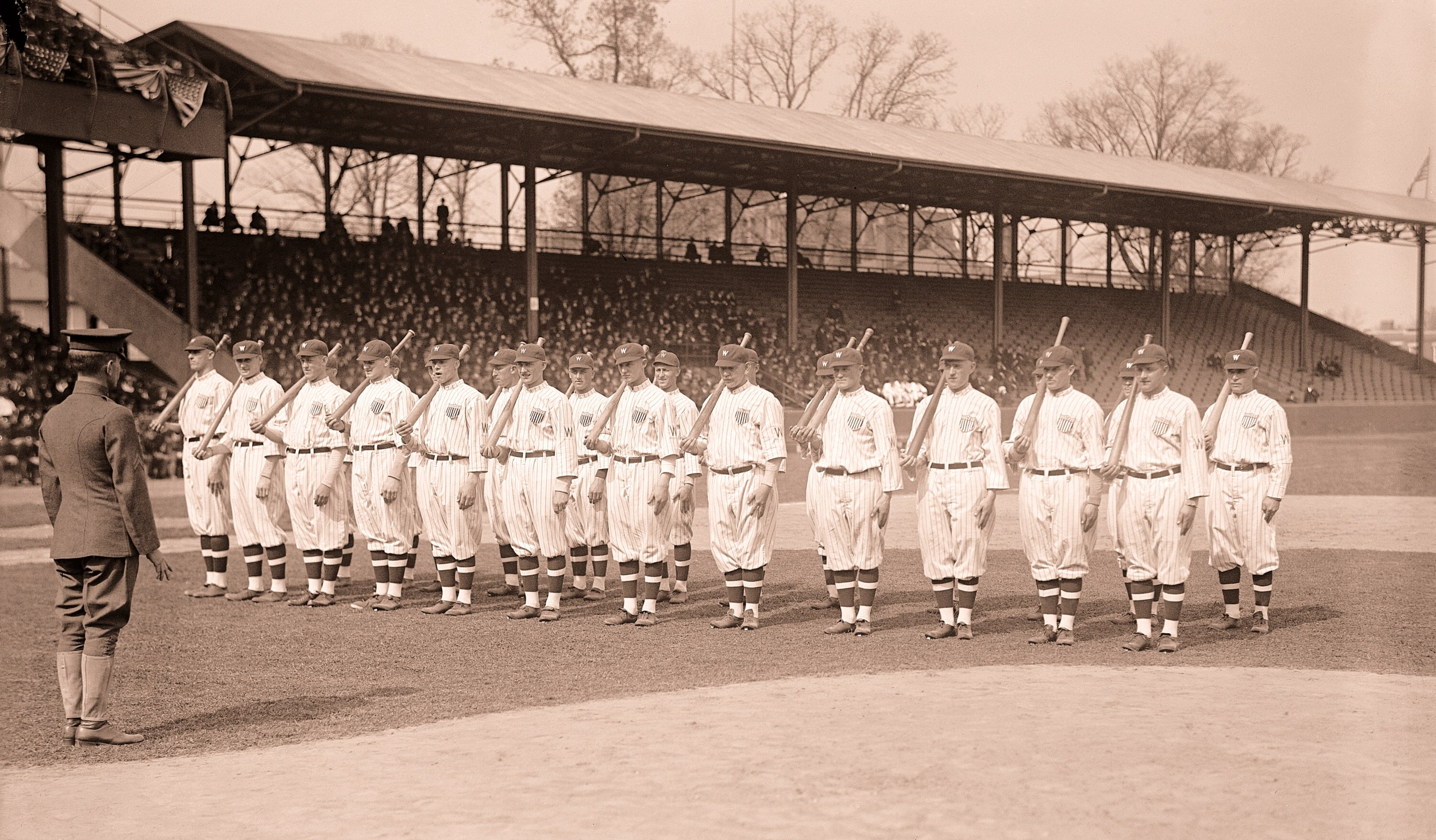
The 1917 Senators on the field at National Park on Opening Day, April 20, 1917.

=== Season standings ===
American League
Team	W	L	Pct.	GB	Home	Road
Chicago White Sox	100	54	.649	—	56‍–‍21	44‍–‍33
Boston Red Sox	90	62	.592	9	45‍–‍33	45‍–‍29
Cleveland Indians	88	66	.571	12	44‍–‍34	44‍–‍32
Detroit Tigers	78	75	.510	21½	34‍–‍41	44‍–‍34
Washington Senators	74	79	.484	25½	42‍–‍35	32‍–‍44
New York Yankees	71	82	.464	28½	35‍–‍40	36‍–‍42
St. Louis Browns	57	97	.370	43	31‍–‍46	26‍–‍51
Philadelphia Athletics	55	98	.359	44½	29‍–‍47	26‍–‍51

=== Record vs. opponents ===
1917 American League record Sources:
Team	BOS	CWS	CLE	DET	NYY	PHA	SLB	WSH
Boston	—	10–12–1	10–12	9–12	13–9–1	18–3–1	17–5–1	13–9–1
Chicago	12–10–1	—	14–8	16–6	12–10	15–7	16–6	15–7–1
Cleveland	12–10	8–14	—	12–10	15–7	16–6	14–8	11–11–2
Detroit	12–9	6–16	10–12	—	13–9–1	12–10	14–8	11–11
New York	9–13–1	10–12	7–15	9–13–1	—	15–7	13–9	8–13
Philadelphia	3–18–1	7–15	6–16	10–12	7–15	—	11–11	11–11
St. Louis	5–17–1	6–16	8–14	8–14	9–13	11–11	—	10–12
Washington	9–13–1	7–15–1	11–11–2	11–11	13–8	11–11	12–10	—

=== Roster ===
1917 Washington Senators
Roster
Pitchers: Doc Ayers; Molly Craft; George Dumont; Bert Gallia; Harry Harper; Walter Johnson; Jim Shaw; Doc Waldbauer	Catchers: Eddie Ainsmith; John Henry; Infielders: Sam Crane; Eddie Foster; Patsy Gharrity; Joe Judge; Joe Leonard; George McBride; Ray Morgan; Bill Murray; Howie Shanks	Outfielders: Charlie Jamieson; Mike Menosky; Clyde Milan; Horace Milan; Sam Rice; Elmer Smith	Manager: Clark Griffith

== Player stats ==
=== Batting ===
==== Starters by position ====
Note: Pos = Position; G = Games played; AB = At bats; H = Hits; Avg. = Batting average; HR = Home runs; RBI = Runs batted in

Pos	Player	G	AB	H	Avg.	HR	RBI
C	Eddie Ainsmith	125	350	67	.191	0	42
1B	Joe Judge	102	393	112	.285	2	30
2B	Ray Morgan	101	338	90	.266	1	33
SS	Howie Shanks	126	430	87	.202	0	28
3B	Eddie Foster	143	554	130	.235	0	43
OF	Mike Menosky	114	322	83	.258	1	34
OF	Clyde Milan	155	579	170	.294	0	48
OF	Sam Rice	155	586	177	.302	0	69

==== Other batters ====
Note: G = Games played; AB = At bats; H = Hits; Avg. = Batting average; HR = Home runs; RBI = Runs batted in

Player	G	AB	H	Avg.	HR	RBI
Joe Leonard	99	297	57	.192	0	23
Patsy Gharrity	76	176	50	.284	0	18
John Henry	65	163	31	.190	0	18
George McBride	50	141	27	.191	0	9
Elmer Smith	35	117	26	.222	0	17
Sam Crane	32	95	17	.179	0	4
Horace Milan	31	73	21	.288	0	9
Charlie Jamieson	20	35	6	.171	0	2
Bill Murray	8	21	3	.143	0	4

=== Pitching ===
==== Starting pitchers ====
Note: G = Games pitched; IP = Innings pitched; W = Wins; L = Losses; ERA = Earned run average; SO = Strikeouts

Player	G	IP	W	L	ERA	SO
Walter Johnson	47	326.0	23	16	2.21	88
Jim Shaw	47	266.1	15	14	3.21	118
Harry Harper	31	179.1	11	12	3.01	99

==== Other pitchers ====
Note: G = Games pitched; IP = Innings pitched; W = Wins; L = Losses; ERA = Earned run average; SO = Strikeouts

Player	G	IP	W	L	ERA	SO
Bert Gallia	42	207.2	9	13	2.99	84
Doc Ayers	40	207.2	11	10	2.17	78
George Dumont	37	204.2	5	14	2.55	65

==== Relief pitchers ====
Note: G = Games pitched; W = Wins; L = Losses; SV = Saves; ERA = Earned run average; SO = Strikeouts

Player	G	W	L	SV	ERA	SO
Molly Craft	8	0	0	1	3.86	2
Doc Waldbauer	2	0	0	1	7.20	2
Charlie Jamieson	1	0	0	0	38.57	1
