= 1917 Cleveland Indians season =

1917 Cleveland Indians
- League: American League
- Ballpark: Dunn Field
- City: Cleveland, Ohio
- Record: 88–66 (.571)
- League place: 3rd
- Owners: Jim Dunn
- Managers: Lee Fohl

The 1917 Cleveland Indians season was a season in American baseball. The team finished third in the American League with a record of 88–66, 12 games behind the Chicago White Sox.

== Regular season ==
=== Season standings ===
American League
Team	W	L	Pct.	GB	Home	Road
Chicago White Sox	100	54	.649	—	56‍–‍21	44‍–‍33
Boston Red Sox	90	62	.592	9	45‍–‍33	45‍–‍29
Cleveland Indians	88	66	.571	12	44‍–‍34	44‍–‍32
Detroit Tigers	78	75	.510	21½	34‍–‍41	44‍–‍34
Washington Senators	74	79	.484	25½	42‍–‍35	32‍–‍44
New York Yankees	71	82	.464	28½	35‍–‍40	36‍–‍42
St. Louis Browns	57	97	.370	43	31‍–‍46	26‍–‍51
Philadelphia Athletics	55	98	.359	44½	29‍–‍47	26‍–‍51

=== Record vs. opponents ===
1917 American League record Sources:
Team	BOS	CWS	CLE	DET	NYY	PHA	SLB	WSH
Boston	—	10–12–1	10–12	9–12	13–9–1	18–3–1	17–5–1	13–9–1
Chicago	12–10–1	—	14–8	16–6	12–10	15–7	16–6	15–7–1
Cleveland	12–10	8–14	—	12–10	15–7	16–6	14–8	11–11–2
Detroit	12–9	6–16	10–12	—	13–9–1	12–10	14–8	11–11
New York	9–13–1	10–12	7–15	9–13–1	—	15–7	13–9	8–13
Philadelphia	3–18–1	7–15	6–16	10–12	7–15	—	11–11	11–11
St. Louis	5–17–1	6–16	8–14	8–14	9–13	11–11	—	10–12
Washington	9–13–1	7–15–1	11–11–2	11–11	13–8	11–11	12–10	—

=== Roster ===
1917 Cleveland Indians
Roster
Pitchers: Jim Bagby; Joe Boehling; Fritz Coumbe; Stan Coveleski; George Dickerson; Al Gould; Ed Klepfer; Otis Lambeth; Guy Morton; Pop-Boy Smith; Red Torkelson; Joe Wood	Catchers: Josh Billings; Hank DeBerry; Steve O'Neill; Infielders: Ray Chapman; Ferd Eunick; Joe Evans; Lou Guisto; Joe Harris; Ivan Howard; Ray Miller; Terry Turner; Bill Wambsganss	Outfielders: Milo Allison; Jack Graney; Marty Kavanagh; Braggo Roth; Elmer Smith; Tris Speaker	Manager: Lee Fohl

== Player stats ==
=== Batting ===
==== Starters by position ====
Note: Pos = Position; G = Games played; AB = At bats; H = Hits; Avg. = Batting average; HR = Home runs; RBI = Runs batted in

Pos	Player	G	AB	H	Avg.	HR	RBI
C	Steve O'Neill	129	370	68	.184	0	29
1B	Joe Harris	112	369	112	.304	0	65
2B	Bill Wambsganss	141	499	127	.255	0	43
SS	Ray Chapman	156	563	170	.302	2	36
3B	Joe Evans	132	385	73	.190	2	33
OF	Jack Graney	146	535	122	.228	3	35
OF	Braggo Roth	145	495	141	.285	1	72
OF	Tris Speaker	142	523	184	.352	2	60

==== Other batters ====
Note: G = Games played; AB = At bats; H = Hits; Avg. = Batting average; HR = Home runs; RBI = Runs batted in

Player	G	AB	H	Avg.	HR	RBI
Lou Guisto	73	200	37	.185	0	29
Terry Turner	69	180	37	.206	0	15
Elmer Smith	64	161	42	.261	3	22
Josh Billings	66	129	23	.178	0	9
Ivan Howard	27	39	4	.103	0	0
Milo Allison	32	35	5	.143	0	0
Hank DeBerry	25	33	9	.273	0	1
Ray Miller	19	21	4	.190	0	2
Marty Kavanagh	14	14	0	.000	0	0
Ferd Eunick	1	2	0	.000	0	0

=== Pitching ===
==== Starting pitchers ====
Note: G = Games pitched; IP = Innings pitched; W = Wins; L = Losses; ERA = Earned run average; SO = Strikeouts

Player	G	IP	W	L	ERA	SO
Jim Bagby	49	320.2	23	13	1.96	83
Stan Coveleski	45	298.1	19	14	1.81	133
Ed Klepfer	41	213.0	14	4	2.37	66
Red Torkelson	4	22.1	2	1	7.66	10

==== Other pitchers ====
Note: G = Games pitched; IP = Innings pitched; W = Wins; L = Losses; ERA = Earned run average; SO = Strikeouts

Player	G	IP	W	L	ERA	SO
Guy Morton	35	161.0	10	10	2.74	62
Fritz Coumbe	34	134.1	8	6	2.14	30
Otis Lambeth	26	97.1	7	6	3.14	27
Al Gould	27	94.0	4	4	3.64	24
Joe Boehling	12	46.1	1	6	4.66	11
Smoky Joe Wood	5	15.2	0	1	3.45	2

==== Relief pitchers ====
Note: G = Games pitched; W = Wins; L = Losses; SV = Saves; ERA = Earned run average; SO = Strikeouts

Player	G	W	L	SV	ERA	SO
Pop-Boy Smith	6	0	1	0	8.31	3
George Dickerson	1	0	0	0	0.00	0
