= Cliff Hill =

Cliff Hill may refer to:

- Cliff Hill (rugby league)
- Cliff Hill (baseball)

== See also ==
- Cliffe Hill, a hill near Lewes, East Sussex, England
