= Biaggi =

Biaggi is an Italian surname. Notable people with the surname include:

- Alessandra Biaggi (born 1986), American politician
- Federico Biaggi (born 1987), Italian motorcycle racer
- Ingrid Vila Biaggi (born 1974), Puerto Rican engineer
- Mario Biaggi (1917–2015), American politician and police officer
- Max Biaggi (born 1971), Italian motorcycle racer
- Olivier Biaggi (born 1971), Swiss football player
- Virgilio Biaggi (1913–2007), Puerto Rican ornithologist and professor of biology

== See also ==
- Augusto Gansser-Biaggi (1910–2012), Swiss geologist
