= 1917 Detroit Tigers season =

Major League Baseball season

1917 Detroit Tigers
- League: American League
- Ballpark: Navin Field
- City: Detroit
- Record: 78–75 (.510)
- League place: 4th
- Owners: William H. Yawkey and Frank Navin
- Managers: Hughie Jennings

The 1917 Detroit Tigers season was a season in American baseball. The team finished fourth in the American League with a record of 78–75, 21½ games behind the Chicago White Sox.

== Regular season ==
=== Season standings ===
American League
| Team | W | L | Pct. | GB | Home | Road |
|---|---|---|---|---|---|---|
| Chicago White Sox | 100 | 54 | .649 | — | 56‍–‍21 | 44‍–‍33 |
| Boston Red Sox | 90 | 62 | .592 | 9 | 45‍–‍33 | 45‍–‍29 |
| Cleveland Indians | 88 | 66 | .571 | 12 | 44‍–‍34 | 44‍–‍32 |
| Detroit Tigers | 78 | 75 | .510 | 21½ | 34‍–‍41 | 44‍–‍34 |
| Washington Senators | 74 | 79 | .484 | 25½ | 42‍–‍35 | 32‍–‍44 |
| New York Yankees | 71 | 82 | .464 | 28½ | 35‍–‍40 | 36‍–‍42 |
| St. Louis Browns | 57 | 97 | .370 | 43 | 31‍–‍46 | 26‍–‍51 |
| Philadelphia Athletics | 55 | 98 | .359 | 44½ | 29‍–‍47 | 26‍–‍51 |

=== Record vs. opponents ===
1917 American League record Sources:
| Team | BOS | CWS | CLE | DET | NYY | PHA | SLB | WSH |
|---|---|---|---|---|---|---|---|---|
| Boston | — | 10–12–1 | 10–12 | 9–12 | 13–9–1 | 18–3–1 | 17–5–1 | 13–9–1 |
| Chicago | 12–10–1 | — | 14–8 | 16–6 | 12–10 | 15–7 | 16–6 | 15–7–1 |
| Cleveland | 12–10 | 8–14 | — | 12–10 | 15–7 | 16–6 | 14–8 | 11–11–2 |
| Detroit | 12–9 | 6–16 | 10–12 | — | 13–9–1 | 12–10 | 14–8 | 11–11 |
| New York | 9–13–1 | 10–12 | 7–15 | 9–13–1 | — | 15–7 | 13–9 | 8–13 |
| Philadelphia | 3–18–1 | 7–15 | 6–16 | 10–12 | 7–15 | — | 11–11 | 11–11 |
| St. Louis | 5–17–1 | 6–16 | 8–14 | 8–14 | 9–13 | 11–11 | — | 10–12 |
| Washington | 9–13–1 | 7–15–1 | 11–11–2 | 11–11 | 13–8 | 11–11 | 12–10 | — |

=== Roster ===
1917 Detroit Tigers
Roster
| Pitchers: Bernie Boland; Johnny Couch; Harry Coveleski; George Cunningham; Hooks Dauss; Howard Ehmke; Bill James; Deacon Jones; Willie Mitchell | Catchers: Tubby Spencer; Oscar Stanage; Archie Yelle; Infielders: George Burns; Donie Bush; Sam Crawford; Tony DeFate; Ben Dyer; Babe Ellison; Bob Jones; Ossie Vitt; Ralph Young | Outfielders: Ty Cobb; Ira Flagstead; George Harper; Harry Heilmann; Fred Nicholson; Bobby Veach; Other positions: Frank Walker | Manager: Hughie Jennings; Coaches: Jimmy Burke |

== Player stats ==
=== Batting ===
==== Starters by position ====
Note: Pos = Position; G = Games played; AB = At bats; H = Hits; Avg. = Batting average; HR = Home runs; RBI = Runs batted in

| Pos | Player | G | AB | H | Avg. | HR | RBI |
|---|---|---|---|---|---|---|---|
| C | Oscar Stanage | 99 | 297 | 61 | .205 | 0 | 30 |
| 1B | George Burns | 119 | 407 | 92 | .226 | 1 | 40 |
| 2B | Ralph Young | 141 | 503 | 116 | .231 | 1 | 38 |
| SS | Donie Bush | 147 | 581 | 163 | .281 | 0 | 23 |
| 3B | Ossie Vitt | 140 | 512 | 130 | .254 | 0 | 45 |
| OF | Harry Heilmann | 150 | 556 | 156 | .281 | 5 | 85 |
| OF | Ty Cobb | 152 | 588 | 225 | .383 | 6 | 106 |
| OF | Bobby Veach | 154 | 571 | 182 | .319 | 8 | 110 |

==== Other batters ====
Note: G = Games played; AB = At bats; H = Hits; Avg. = Batting average; HR = Home runs; RBI = Runs batted in

| Player | G | AB | H | Avg. | HR | RBI |
|---|---|---|---|---|---|---|
| Tubby Spencer | 70 | 192 | 46 | .240 | 0 | 22 |
| George Harper | 47 | 117 | 24 | .205 | 0 | 12 |
| Sam Crawford | 61 | 104 | 18 | .173 | 2 | 11 |
| Bob Jones | 46 | 77 | 12 | .156 | 0 | 2 |
| Ben Dyer | 30 | 67 | 14 | .209 | 0 | 0 |
| Archie Yelle | 25 | 51 | 7 | .137 | 0 | 0 |
| Babe Ellison | 9 | 29 | 5 | .172 | 1 | 4 |
| Fred Nicholson | 13 | 14 | 4 | .286 | 0 | 2 |
| Ira Flagstead | 4 | 4 | 0 | .000 | 0 | 0 |
| Frank Walker | 2 | 2 | 0 | .000 | 0 | 0 |
| Tony DeFate | 3 | 2 | 0 | .000 | 0 | 0 |

=== Pitching ===
==== Starting pitchers ====
Note: G = Games pitched; IP = Innings pitched; W = Wins; L = Losses; ERA = Earned run average; SO = Strikeouts

| Player | G | IP | W | L | ERA | SO |
|---|---|---|---|---|---|---|
| Hooks Dauss | 37 | 270.2 | 17 | 14 | 2.43 | 102 |
| Bernie Boland | 43 | 238.0 | 16 | 11 | 2.68 | 89 |
| Howard Ehmke | 35 | 206.0 | 10 | 15 | 2.97 | 90 |
| Bill James | 34 | 198.0 | 13 | 10 | 2.09 | 62 |
| Willie Mitchell | 30 | 185.1 | 12 | 8 | 2.19 | 80 |

==== Other pitchers ====
Note: G = Games pitched; IP = Innings pitched; W = Wins; L = Losses; ERA = Earned run average; SO = Strikeouts

| Player | G | IP | W | L | ERA | SO |
|---|---|---|---|---|---|---|
| George Cunningham | 44 | 139.0 | 2 | 7 | 2.91 | 49 |
| Deacon Jones | 24 | 77.0 | 4 | 4 | 2.92 | 28 |
| Harry Coveleski | 16 | 69.0 | 4 | 6 | 2.61 | 15 |

==== Relief pitchers ====
Note: G = Games pitched; W = Wins; L = Losses; SV = Saves; ERA = Earned run average; SO = Strikeouts

| Player | G | W | L | SV | ERA | SO |
|---|---|---|---|---|---|---|
| Johnny Couch | 3 | 0 | 0 | 0 | 2.70 | 1 |
