= 1917 New York Yankees season =

Season for the Major League Baseball team the New York Yankees

1917 New York Yankees
- League: American League
- Ballpark: Polo Grounds
- City: New York City, New York
- Record: 71–62 (.534)
- League place: 6th
- Owners: Jacob Ruppert and Tillinghast L'Hommedieu Huston
- Managers: Bill Donovan

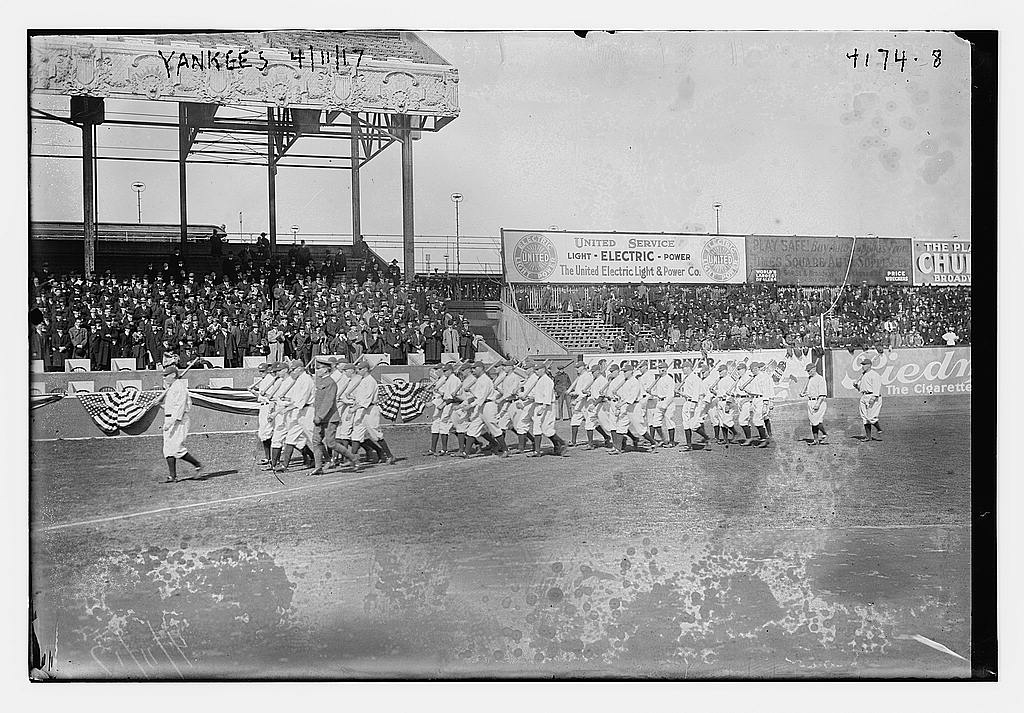
Yankees on April 11, 1917

The 1917 New York Yankees season was the 15th season for the franchise. The team finished with a record of 71–82, finishing 28½ games behind the American League champion Chicago White Sox. New York was managed by Bill Donovan. Their home games were played at the Polo Grounds.

== Opening game ==
The opening game was against the Boston Red Sox on April 11, 1917, at the Polo Grounds in New York. 16,000 fans were in attendance. The Yankees lost 10–3. Major General Leonard Wood attended the game and threw out the first ball. Wood had drill sergeant Gibson, the recruiting officer from Macon, Georgia, where the team had their spring training, march the Yankees across the field in formation carrying rifles.

== Regular season ==
=== Season standings ===
American League
Team	W	L	Pct.	GB	Home	Road
Chicago White Sox	100	54	.649	—	56‍–‍21	44‍–‍33
Boston Red Sox	90	62	.592	9	45‍–‍33	45‍–‍29
Cleveland Indians	88	66	.571	12	44‍–‍34	44‍–‍32
Detroit Tigers	78	75	.510	21½	34‍–‍41	44‍–‍34
Washington Senators	74	79	.484	25½	42‍–‍35	32‍–‍44
New York Yankees	71	82	.464	28½	35‍–‍40	36‍–‍42
St. Louis Browns	57	97	.370	43	31‍–‍46	26‍–‍51
Philadelphia Athletics	55	98	.359	44½	29‍–‍47	26‍–‍51

=== Record vs. opponents ===
1917 American League record Sources:
Team	BOS	CWS	CLE	DET	NYY	PHA	SLB	WSH
Boston	—	10–12–1	10–12	9–12	13–9–1	18–3–1	17–5–1	13–9–1
Chicago	12–10–1	—	14–8	16–6	12–10	15–7	16–6	15–7–1
Cleveland	12–10	8–14	—	12–10	15–7	16–6	14–8	11–11–2
Detroit	12–9	6–16	10–12	—	13–9–1	12–10	14–8	11–11
New York	9–13–1	10–12	7–15	9–13–1	—	15–7	13–9	8–13
Philadelphia	3–18–1	7–15	6–16	10–12	7–15	—	11–11	11–11
St. Louis	5–17–1	6–16	8–14	8–14	9–13	11–11	—	10–12
Washington	9–13–1	7–15–1	11–11–2	11–11	13–8	11–11	12–10	—

=== Roster ===
1917 New York Yankees
Roster
Pitchers: Neal Brady; Ray Caldwell; Nick Cullop; Jack Enright; Ray Fisher; Slim Love; Bob McGraw; George Mogridge; Ed Monroe; Bill Piercy; Allen Russell; Bob Shawkey; Urban Shocker; Walt Smallwood; Hank Thormahlen	Catchers: Walt Alexander; Les Nunamaker; Muddy Ruel; Roxy Walters; Infielders: Home Run Baker; Paddy Baumann; Chick Fewster; Joe Gedeon; Fritz Maisel; Roger Peckinpaugh; Wally Pipp; Aaron Ward	Outfielders: Ángel Aragón; Howie Camp; Frank Gilhooley; Tim Hendryx; Hugh High; Bill Lamar; Lee Magee; Armando Marsans; Elmer Miller; Sammy Vick	Manager: Bill Donovan; Coaches: Duke Farrell

== Player stats ==
=== Batting ===
==== Starters by position ====
Note: Pos = Position; G = Games played; AB = At bats; H = Hits; Avg. = Batting average; HR = Home runs; RBI = Runs batted in

Pos	Player	G	AB	H	Avg.	HR	RBI
C	Les Nunamaker	104	310	81	.261	0	33
1B	Wally Pipp	155	587	143	.244	9	70
2B	Fritz Maisel	113	404	80	.198	0	20
SS	Roger Peckinpaugh	148	543	141	.260	0	41
3B	Home Run Baker	146	553	156	.282	6	71
OF	Tim Hendryx	125	393	98	.249	5	44
OF	Elmer Miller	114	379	95	.251	3	35
OF	Hugh High	103	365	86	.236	1	19

==== Other batters ====
Note: G = Games played; AB = At bats; H = Hits; Avg. = Batting average; HR = Home runs; RBI = Runs batted in

Player	G	AB	H	Avg.	HR	RBI
Lee Magee	51	173	38	.220	0	8
Roxy Walters	61	171	45	.263	0	14
Frank Gilhooley	54	165	40	.242	0	8
Joe Gedeon	33	117	28	.239	0	8
Paddy Baumann	49	110	24	.218	0	8
Armando Marsans	25	88	20	.227	0	15
Walt Alexander	20	51	7	.137	0	4
Ángel Aragón	14	45	3	.067	0	2
Bill Lamar	11	41	10	.244	0	3
Chick Fewster	11	36	8	.222	0	1
Sammy Vick	10	36	10	.278	0	2
Aaron Ward	8	26	3	.115	0	1
Howie Camp	5	21	6	.286	0	0
Muddy Ruel	6	17	2	.118	0	1

=== Pitching ===
==== Starting pitchers ====
Note: G = Games pitched; IP = Innings pitched; W = Wins; L = Losses; ERA = Earned run average; SO = Strikeouts

Player	G	IP	W	L	ERA	SO
Bob Shawkey	32	236.1	13	15	2.44	97
Ray Caldwell	32	236.0	13	16	2.86	102
George Mogridge	29	196.1	9	11	2.98	46
Ray Fisher	23	144.0	8	9	2.19	64
Bob McGraw	2	11.0	0	1	0.82	3
Bill Piercy	1	9.0	0	1	3.00	4
Hank Thormahlen	1	8.0	0	1	2.25	5
Jack Enright	1	5.0	0	1	5.40	1

==== Other pitchers ====
Note: G = Games pitched; IP = Innings pitched; W = Wins; L = Losses; ERA = Earned run average; SO = Strikeouts

Player	G	IP	W	L	ERA	SO
Nick Cullop	30	146.1	5	9	3.32	27
Urban Shocker	26	145.0	8	5	2.61	68
Slim Love	33	130.1	6	5	2.35	82
Allen Russell	25	104.1	7	8	2.24	55
Neal Brady	2	9.0	1	0	2.00	4

==== Relief pitchers ====
Note: G = Games pitched; W = Wins; L = Losses; SV = Saves; ERA = Earned run average; SO = Strikeouts

Player	G	W	L	SV	ERA	SO
Ed Monroe	9	1	0	1	3.45	12
Walt Smallwood	2	0	0	0	0.00	1
