= Danforth (surname) =

Danforth is a surname. Notable people with the surname include:

- Asa Danforth (1746–1818), American highway engineer of the Revolutionary War era
- Asa Danforth Jr. (1768–1821), Upper Canada highway engineer
- Charles Haskell Danforth (1833–1969), American comparative anatomist
- Dave Danforth (1890–1970), American professional baseball player
- Elizabeth Danforth, creator in the role-playing game and video game industry
- Elliott Danforth, New York State Treasurer 1890–1893
- Emily M. Danforth (born 1980), US author
- George F. Danforth (1819–1899), New York judge
- Harold Warren Danforth (1916–1993), Member of the Parliament of Canada
- John Danforth (born 1936), 27th United States Ambassador to the United Nations
- Justin Danforth (born 1993), professional ice hockey player
- Loring Danforth, anthropology professor at Bates College in Lewiston, Maine
- Samuel Danforth (1626–1674), Puritan minister
- Stuart Taylor Danforth (1900–1938), American professor of zoology in Puerto Rico
- Thomas Danforth (1622–1699), a judge in the Salem witch trials
- Walter R. Danforth (1787–1861), journalist and 4th mayor of Providence, Rhode Island.
- William H. Danforth (1870–1955), founder of Ralston-Purina
- William Henry Danforth, M.D. (1926–2020), American physician and educator

Fictional characters:

- Chad Danforth, character from the movie High School Musical, played by Corbin Bleu
