= Danforth =

Danforth may refer to:

- Danforth (surname)

== Places ==
=== Canada ===
- Danforth Avenue, a thoroughfare in Toronto, Ontario
- Toronto—Danforth, an electoral district
- Toronto—Danforth (provincial electoral district), a provincial electoral district in Ontario
- Danforth (electoral district), an abolished electoral district in Ontario
- Greektown, Toronto, or The Danforth, a Toronto neighbourhood

=== United States ===
- Danforth, Illinois, a village
- Danforth, Maine, a town
  - Danforth (CDP), Maine, the main village in the town
- Danforth, Missouri, an unincorporated community

== Other uses ==
- Danforth (anchor), a fluke-style anchor
- Danforth Avenue (HBLR station), a light rail station in Hudson County, New Jersey
- Danforth Collegiate and Technical Institute, a technical school in Toronto, Canada
- Danforth Museum, an art museum and school in Framingham, Massachusetts
- Danforth, a fictional character in the Cthulhu Mythos

== See also ==
- 2018 Toronto shooting, also known as the Danforth Shooting
- Bloor–Danforth line, a subway line in Toronto
- Danforth's Road, Asa Danforth Jr.'s early colonial road from eastern Toronto to the Trent River
- Danforth GO Station, a Toronto station on the GO Transit commuter rail system
- Donald Danforth Plant Science Center, a not-for-profit research institute based in St. Louis, Missouri
- Toronto—Danforth, a federal and provincial electoral district
