= Scrappy Moore =

Scrappy Moore may refer to:

- Scrappy Moore (American football) (1903–1971), American football coach at the University of Chattanooga
- Scrappy Moore (baseball) (1892–1964), Major League Baseball player
