= Ferd Eunick =

American baseball player (1892–1959)

- Third Baseman
- Born: April 22, 1892; Baltimore, Maryland
- Died: December 9, 1959 (aged 67); Baltimore, Maryland
- Batted: Right Threw: Right

MLB debut
- August 29, 1917, for the Cleveland Indians

Last MLB appearance
- August 29, 1917, for the Cleveland Indians

MLB statistics
- Batting average: .000
- Hits: 0
- Runs: 0
- Stats at Baseball Reference

Teams
- Cleveland Indians (1917)

Fernandas Bowen Eunick (April 22, 1892 – December 9, 1959) was a Major League Baseball third baseman who played for the Cleveland Indians. He played in one game on August 29, 1917 during the 1917 Cleveland Indians season. He played for the class D Marshalltown Ansons in 1916 and 1917 before being picked up by the Indians.
