= Doc Waldbauer =

American baseball player (1892-1969)

- Pitcher
- Born: February 22, 1892; Richmond, Virginia, U.S.
- Died: July 16, 1969 (aged 77); Yakima, Washington, U.S.
- Batted: Right Threw: Right

MLB debut
- September 24, 1917, for the Washington Senators

Last MLB appearance
- September 29, 1917, for the Washington Senators

MLB statistics
- Win–loss record: 0–0
- Earned run average: 7.20
- Strikeouts: 2
- Stats at Baseball Reference

Teams
- Washington Senators (1917)

Albert Charles "Doc" Waldbauer (February 22, 1892 – July 16, 1969) was an American Major League Baseball pitcher who played for one season. He played for the Washington Senators for two games during the 1917 Washington Senators season.
