= Walter Anderson (baseball) =

American baseball player

- Pitcher
- Born: September 25, 1897; Grand Rapids, Michigan, U.S.
- Died: January 6, 1990 (aged 92); Battle Creek, Michigan, U.S.
- Batted: Left Threw: Left

MLB debut
- May 14, 1917, for the Philadelphia Athletics

Last MLB appearance
- May 2, 1919, for the Philadelphia Athletics

MLB statistics
- Win–loss record: 1–0
- Earned run average: 3.25
- Strikeouts: 20
- Stats at Baseball Reference

Teams
- Philadelphia Athletics (1917, 1919)

Walter Carl "Lefty" Anderson (September 25, 1897 – January 6, 1990) was an American professional baseball player whose playing career spanned five season, including parts of two in Major League Baseball with the Philadelphia Athletics in 1917 and 1919. Anderson compiled a major league record of 1–0 with a 3.25 earned run average (ERA) and 20 strikeouts in 17 games, two starts. He also played in the minor leagues with the Class-B Fort Worth Panthers, the Double-A Louisville Colonels and the Class-B Rockford Rox. Before his professional career, Anderson attended Western Michigan University. Anderson also served in World War I. Anderson batted and threw left-handed.

== Amateur career ==
Anderson attended Western Michigan University from 1916 to 1917. After making his debut in Major League Baseball in 1918, he became the second attendee of Western Michigan to do so, following Ernie Koob, who debuted in 1915.

== Professional career ==
Anderson officially made his professional baseball debut in 1913 with the Class-B Fort Worth Panthers of the Texas League. Anderson then left his baseball career to serve in World War I. He returned to baseball in 1917 as a member of the Philadelphia Athletics in Major League Baseball. Anderson made his major league debut on May 14, 1917. With the Athletics that season, Anderson did not compile a record with a 3.03 earned run average (ERA), 10 strikeouts in 14 games (two starts). In 1918, Anderson did not play professionally, but returned to Athletics in 1919. In the majors that season, Anderson went 1–0 with a 3.86 ERA and 10 strikeouts in three games, all in relief. After completing his stint with the Athletics, Anderson joined the Double-A Louisville Colonels. That season in the minor leagues, Anderson went 6–1 with a 2.88 ERA in 13 games played. Anderson would play two more season, 1920 and 1921, in professional baseball. With the Rockford Rox of the Class-B Illinois–Indiana–Iowa League, Anderson went 2–6 in 1920 and 0–1 in 1921.
