= 1917 Boston Red Sox season =

Major League Baseball season

1917 Boston Red Sox
- League: American League
- Ballpark: Fenway Park
- City: Boston, Massachusetts
- Record: 90–62 (.592)
- League place: 2nd
- Owners: Joseph Lannin, Harry Frazee
- Managers: Jack Barry
- Stats: ESPN.com; Baseball Reference

The 1917 Boston Red Sox season was the 17th season in the franchise's Major League Baseball history. The Red Sox finished second in the American League (AL) with a record of 90 wins and 62 losses, nine games behind the Chicago White Sox, who went on to win the 1917 World Series. The team played its home games at Fenway Park.

== Offseason ==
On February 24, 1917, Pitcher "Smoky Joe" Wood was sold to the Cleveland Indians for $15,000.

== Regular season ==
On September 27, 1917, the Red Sox staged a benefit against a mostly American League team of all-stars to raise funds for Tim Murnane, long time baseball editor of The Boston Globe. Connie Mack managed a team that included Shoeless Joe Jackson, Ty Cobb, Tris Speaker, Ray Chapman, Buck Weaver, Walter Johnson, and Rabbit Maranville (then with the Boston Braves of the National League). Babe Ruth pitched several innings for the Red Sox, yielding three singles, as the Red Sox defeated the All-Stars, 2–0. Attendance at the game was 17,119.

=== Season standings ===
American League
| Team | W | L | Pct. | GB | Home | Road |
|---|---|---|---|---|---|---|
| Chicago White Sox | 100 | 54 | .649 | — | 56‍–‍21 | 44‍–‍33 |
| Boston Red Sox | 90 | 62 | .592 | 9 | 45‍–‍33 | 45‍–‍29 |
| Cleveland Indians | 88 | 66 | .571 | 12 | 44‍–‍34 | 44‍–‍32 |
| Detroit Tigers | 78 | 75 | .510 | 21½ | 34‍–‍41 | 44‍–‍34 |
| Washington Senators | 74 | 79 | .484 | 25½ | 42‍–‍35 | 32‍–‍44 |
| New York Yankees | 71 | 82 | .464 | 28½ | 35‍–‍40 | 36‍–‍42 |
| St. Louis Browns | 57 | 97 | .370 | 43 | 31‍–‍46 | 26‍–‍51 |
| Philadelphia Athletics | 55 | 98 | .359 | 44½ | 29‍–‍47 | 26‍–‍51 |

=== Record vs. opponents ===
1917 American League record Sources:
| Team | BOS | CWS | CLE | DET | NYY | PHA | SLB | WSH |
|---|---|---|---|---|---|---|---|---|
| Boston | — | 10–12–1 | 10–12 | 9–12 | 13–9–1 | 18–3–1 | 17–5–1 | 13–9–1 |
| Chicago | 12–10–1 | — | 14–8 | 16–6 | 12–10 | 15–7 | 16–6 | 15–7–1 |
| Cleveland | 12–10 | 8–14 | — | 12–10 | 15–7 | 16–6 | 14–8 | 11–11–2 |
| Detroit | 12–9 | 6–16 | 10–12 | — | 13–9–1 | 12–10 | 14–8 | 11–11 |
| New York | 9–13–1 | 10–12 | 7–15 | 9–13–1 | — | 15–7 | 13–9 | 8–13 |
| Philadelphia | 3–18–1 | 7–15 | 6–16 | 10–12 | 7–15 | — | 11–11 | 11–11 |
| St. Louis | 5–17–1 | 6–16 | 8–14 | 8–14 | 9–13 | 11–11 | — | 10–12 |
| Washington | 9–13–1 | 7–15–1 | 11–11–2 | 11–11 | 13–8 | 11–11 | 12–10 | — |

=== Opening Day lineup ===
| Harry Hooper | RF |
| Jack Barry | 2B |
| Dick Hoblitzel | 1B |
| Duffy Lewis | LF |
| Tilly Walker | CF |
| Larry Gardner | 3B |
| Everett Scott | SS |
| Pinch Thomas | C |
| Babe Ruth | P |

=== Roster ===
1917 Boston Red Sox roster
Roster
| Pitchers: Lore Bader; Rube Foster; Sad Sam Jones; Dutch Leonard; Carl Mays; Herb Pennock; Babe Ruth; Ernie Shore; Weldon Wyckoff | Catchers: Sam Agnew; Hick Cady; Wally Mayer; Pinch Thomas; Infielders: Jack Barry; Jimmy Cooney; Del Gainer; Larry Gardner; Dick Hoblitzell; Hal Janvrin; Mike McNally; Everett Scott | Outfielders: Harry Hooper; Duffy Lewis; Chick Shorten; Tilly Walker; Jimmy Walsh; Pinch hitter: Olaf Henriksen | Manager: Jack Barry |

== Player stats ==
=== Batting ===
==== Starters by position ====
Note: Pos = Position; G = Games played; AB = At bats; H = Hits; Avg. = Batting average; HR = Home runs; RBI = Runs batted in

| Pos | Player | G | AB | H | Avg. | HR | RBI |
|---|---|---|---|---|---|---|---|
| C | Sam Agnew | 85 | 260 | 54 | .208 | 0 | 16 |
| 1B | Dick Hoblitzell | 120 | 420 | 108 | .257 | 1 | 47 |
| 2B | Jack Barry | 116 | 388 | 83 | .214 | 2 | 30 |
| SS | Everett Scott | 157 | 528 | 127 | .241 | 0 | 50 |
| 3B | Larry Gardner | 146 | 501 | 133 | .265 | 1 | 61 |
| OF | Tillie Walker | 106 | 337 | 83 | .246 | 2 | 37 |
| OF | Duffy Lewis | 150 | 553 | 167 | .302 | 1 | 65 |
| OF | Harry Hooper | 151 | 559 | 143 | .256 | 3 | 45 |

==== Other batters ====
Note: G = Games played; AB = At bats; H = Hits; Avg. = Batting average; HR = Home runs; RBI = Runs batted in

| Player | G | AB | H | Avg. | HR | RBI |
|---|---|---|---|---|---|---|
| Pinch Thomas | 83 | 202 | 48 | .238 | 0 | 24 |
| Jimmy Walsh | 57 | 185 | 49 | .265 | 0 | 12 |
| Del Gainer | 52 | 172 | 53 | .308 | 2 | 19 |
| Chick Shorten | 69 | 168 | 30 | .179 | 0 | 16 |
| Hal Janvrin | 55 | 127 | 25 | .197 | 0 | 8 |
| Mike McNally | 42 | 50 | 15 | .300 | 0 | 2 |
| Hick Cady | 17 | 46 | 7 | .152 | 0 | 2 |
| Jimmy Cooney | 11 | 36 | 8 | .222 | 0 | 3 |
| Olaf Henriksen | 15 | 12 | 1 | .083 | 0 | 1 |
| Wally Mayer | 4 | 12 | 2 | .167 | 0 | 0 |

=== Pitching ===
==== Starting pitchers ====
Note: G = Games pitched; IP = Innings pitched; W = Wins; L = Losses; ERA = Earned run average; SO = Strikeouts

| Player | G | IP | W | L | ERA | SO |
|---|---|---|---|---|---|---|
| Babe Ruth | 41 | 326.1 | 24 | 13 | 2.01 | 128 |
| Dutch Leonard | 37 | 294.1 | 16 | 17 | 2.17 | 144 |
| Carl Mays | 35 | 289.0 | 22 | 9 | 1.74 | 91 |
| Ernie Shore | 29 | 226.2 | 13 | 10 | 2.22 | 57 |
| Rube Foster | 17 | 124.2 | 8 | 7 | 2.53 | 34 |

==== Other pitchers ====
Note: G = Games pitched; IP = Innings pitched; W = Wins; L = Losses; ERA = Earned run average; SO = Strikeouts

| Player | G | IP | W | L | ERA | SO |
|---|---|---|---|---|---|---|
| Herb Pennock | 24 | 100.2 | 5 | 5 | 3.31 | 35 |

==== Relief pitchers ====
Note: G = Games pitched; W = Wins; L = Losses; SV = Saves; ERA = Earned run average; SO = Strikeouts

| Player | G | W | L | SV | ERA | SO |
|---|---|---|---|---|---|---|
| Lore Bader | 15 | 2 | 0 | 1 | 2.35 | 14 |
| Sad Sam Jones | 9 | 0 | 1 | 1 | 4.41 | 5 |
| Weldon Wyckoff | 1 | 0 | 0 | 0 | 1.80 | 1 |
