= Rasty Wright (pitcher) =

American baseball player (1895–1948)

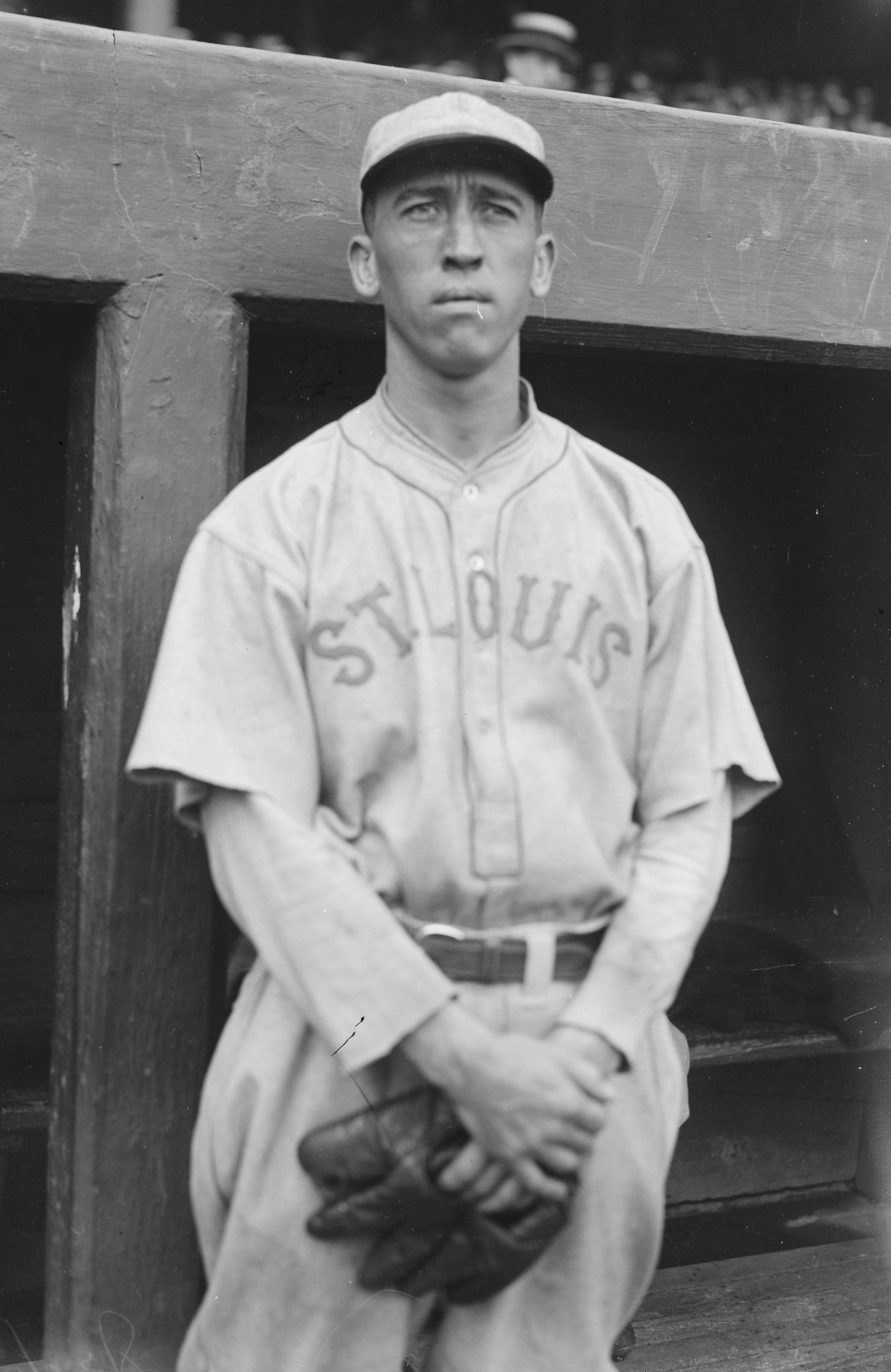
- Pitcher
- Born: November 5, 1895; Ceredo, West Virginia, U.S.
- Died: June 12, 1948 (aged 52); Columbus, Ohio, U.S.
- Batted: Right Threw: Right

MLB debut
- June 22, 1917, for the St. Louis Browns

Last MLB appearance
- October 4, 1923, for the St. Louis Browns

MLB statistics
- Win–loss record: 24–19
- Earned run average: 4.05
- Strikeouts: 114
- Stats at Baseball Reference

Teams
- St. Louis Browns (1917–1919, 1922–1923)

Wayne Bromley "Rasty" Wright (November 5, 1895 – June 12, 1948) was a professional baseball pitcher. He played all or part of five seasons in Major League Baseball for the St. Louis Browns between 1917 and 1923.

== Early life ==
Born to Robert Wright Jr and the former Belle Ferguson, Rasty Wright was born in Ceredo, West Virginia, shortly after the Wright family had moved there from Ohio. Rasty learned about baseball from a young age, as his father and uncles had formed their own family baseball team. As Rasty grew, he began to excel at pitching and even became the team's star pitcher. Wright attended Ceredo-Kenova High School where his brother Sam had been the school's football coach since 1905. Wright was part of the class of 1913 and from there, attended Ohio State University. It was forbidden for freshmen to play for the varsity teams, so Wright initially pitched for Ohio State's freshman team. He made the varsity baseball team his sophomore year. Wright started out 3–1, his only loss was to Illinois. However, his sophomore season would come to a sudden halt after he broke his leg trying to steal home during an intra-squad game. Wright bounced back and cemented his position as the team's ace. Ohio State went 13–2 overall and Wright was named to the All-Conference team for the Western Conference, which was the precursor to the Big Ten.

The 1917 Ohio State baseball team featured Wright, who had been named team captain. It also featured Buckeyes football star Chic Harley and four sport star Fred Norton. That season the Buckeyes, paced by Wright's pitching won their very first national championship in baseball. It would be their only until 1943, when Ironically, Wright had returned to the team as a coach. During the 1917 season, not only did Wright sport a flawless 10–0 record, but his hitting was a strength as well as he batted .357, good enough for third on the team behind Harley and Norton. Meanwhile, Wright was being scouted by several teams, including the St. Louis Browns' Branch Rickey. Rickey had been aware of Wright since Wright's freshman season, when Rickey was trying to recruit Ohio State's baseball coach, L.W. St. John to replace Miller Huggins as coach of the St. Louis Cardinals. Impressed with Wright after a scouting trip, Browns scout Bob Quinn recommended the Browns sign Wright.

== Pro career ==
On June 20, 1917, less than two weeks after signing with St. Louis, Wright made his MLB debut against the Detroit Tigers, surrendering four hits in three innings of work. For the rest of the season, Wright mainly worked out of the bullpen. After returning to Ohio State to complete his studies, Wright returned to the Browns in the summer of 1918. However, the 1918 season was a struggle for the Browns, as the team went through three managers, Fielder Jones, Jimmy Austin, and Jimmy Burke, none of whom could turn around the fortunes of the Browns. Wright went 8–2 before the season was halted when baseball was declared non-essential during World War I. To avoid military service, The Browns arranged for Wright to return to Ohio State to complete his medical studies. While at Ohio State, Wright kept himself in baseball shape by working with the Buckeyes' freshman team as a coach.

The 1919 season turned out to be a rough one for Wright, as he lost all of his decisions and the Browns demoted him to Louisville of the American Association, where he was given the chance to improve his craft under the eye of Joe McCarthy, the future manager of the New York Yankees. Wright would return to the Browns in 1922, going 9–7 with an E.R.A. of 2.92. In 1923, Wright again missed spring training due to his academic studies, and finished the season with an 7–4 record, but his E.R.A. had gotten worse, 6.42. Having issues with his shoulder, Wright sat out the 1924 season, and then his rights were traded by St. Louis to the Los Angeles Angels of the Pacific Coast League. The trade, which netted the Browns catcher Tony Rego and pitcher George Lyons backfired because among the multiple players the Browns traded was a pitching prospect named Charley Root, who'd go on to win 200 games in the majors.

While with Los Angeles, Wright played some of his best baseball. In 1926, Wright went 19–7 with an E.R.A of 3.08. Angels management wanted Wright back for another season, but he opted to hang up the glove to accept a coaching position with Ohio State. In 1929, L.W. St. John stepped aside and Wright was named manager. However, Wright's career as a pro baseball player wasn't finished. In 1929, Wright returned to baseball, and managed to stay in Ohio doing it. He signed with the Toledo Mud Hens of the American Association. The Mud Hens were managed by another future Yankees skipper, Casey Stengel. Signed strictly as a veteran influence, Wright went 2–3 in 22 innings of work. At the conclusion of the 1929 season, Wright hung up his cleats for good.

== Retirement from Baseball ==
When the Great Depression struck, many institutions were forced to tighten their budgets. Ohio State was not immune. In an effort to cut cost, Wright was relieved of his coaching duties, and for the first time in his life, found himself out of baseball. With his own family to support, Wright was forced to look for work elsewhere. Wright found work with Standard Oil managing several service stations located not far from the Ohio State Campus. However, baseball was still in his blood, and he returned to Ohio State, this time as a volunteer baseball coach. He would remain in this role until 1946.

== Death ==
Having retired from coaching due to health issues, Wright went to seek help and was diagnosed with pancreatic cancer. On June 12, 1948, at the age of 52, Rasty Wright died. His body was interred at Union Cemetery East, located in Columbus, Ohio.
