= Virgilio Biaggi =

Puerto Rican ornithologist

Virgilio Biaggi Jr. (1913 – 17 October 2007) was the first university-trained ornithologist from Puerto Rico and a professor of biology at the University of Puerto Rico at Mayagüez. He popularized bird study in the region with his book on the birds of Puerto Rico.

Biaggi was born in Mayagüez, the oldest of six siblings in an academically oriented family. He studied at the college of agriculture and mechanics and worked for a while. His interest in zoology was sparked by Stuart Taylor Danforth (1900-1938) who taught at the college. Biaggi accompanied Danforth on collecting expeditions for birds and insects. He completed his BSc in agricultural sciences in 1940 and received a MSc from Texas A&M in 1942. He then became an associate professor at Mayagüez and in 1949 he completed a PhD from Ohio State University with studies on the Bananaquit (Coereba flaveola) He became a professor in 1952. He headed the department of biology in 1953-54 and served as dean in 1959 at the University of Puerto Rico. He retired in 1974 but continued to work as an emeritus professor.

Biaggi was elected honorary member of the American Ornithologists' Union in 1957. Following a Guggenheim Fellowship in 1957 that allowed him to work at the Smithsonian Institution, he published a book Las Aves de Puerto Rico (1970) which served as a foundation for the study of the birds of Puerto Rico. Biaggi also worked on social work, and was involved in establishing consumer cooperatives in Puerto Rico. He presided on the board of directors for the Puerto Rican Conservation Trust.
