= Vince Molyneaux =

American baseball player (1888–1950)

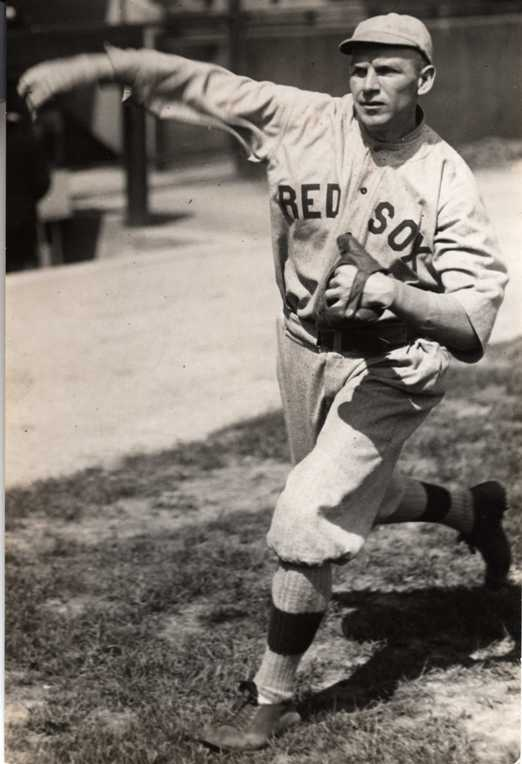
- Pitcher
- Born: August 17, 1888; Lewiston, New York, U.S.
- Died: May 4, 1950 (aged 61); Stamford, Connecticut, U.S.
- Batted: Right Threw: Right

MLB debut
- July 5, 1917, for the St. Louis Browns

Last MLB appearance
- July 18, 1918, for the Boston Red Sox

MLB statistics
- Win–loss record: 1–0
- Earned run average: 4.41
- Strikeouts: 5
- Stats at Baseball Reference

Teams
- St. Louis Browns (1917); Boston Red Sox (1918)

Vincent Leo Molyneaux (August 17, 1888 – May 4, 1950) was an American relief pitcher in Major League Baseball who played for the St. Louis Browns (1917) and Boston Red Sox (1918). Listed at 6' 0", 180 lb., Molyneaux batted and threw right-handed. A native of Lewiston, New York, he attended Niagara University and Villanova University.

In his career, Molyneaux posted a 1–0 record with a 4.41 ERA in 13 games, including five strikeouts, 28 walks, 21 hits allowed, and 32 1/3 innings of work without a save.

Molyneaux died at the age of 61 in Stamford, Connecticut.

Molyneaux was a member of the 1918 American League champion Red Sox, although he did not play in the World Series.
