= Stuart Taylor Danforth =

American naturalist (1900–1938)

Stuart Taylor Danforth (23 September 1900 – 25 November 1938) was a professor of zoology at the University of Puerto Rico at Mayagüez who took an interest in studies on entomology and ornithology of the region. His students included the first professionally trained Puerto Rican ornithologist Virgilio Biaggi and the entomologist José Andrés Ramos Alemar.

== Life and work ==
Danforth was born in New Jersey to Bertha T. and Ralph E. Danforth. His father was a professor of zoology at Rutgers University but moved to head the department of biology at the University of Puerto Rico at Mayagüez in 1921. Danforth grew up there and became interested in nature at an early age. He kept notes from the age of seven and his notes later were voluminous journals. Danforth went to study in Rutgers College and spent some years in East Jaffrey, New Hampshire. He studied the bird life of the Cartegena Lagoon for several years and it became the heart of his doctoral thesis from Cornell University in 1925. He taught at Temple University for a year before taking up the same position that his father had at Mayagüez. He began to study the bird life of the region, making expeditions into the West Indies, the Lesser Antilles and other parts of the Caribbean region. He contracted tuberculosis in 1937 which eventually led to his death. He produced one of the first books on the birds of the region Los Pajaros de Puerto Rico (1936) and inspired his students at the College of Agriculture (Colegio de Agricultura y Artes Mecánicas) to continue field studies. One of his students was Virgilio Biaggi who became an ornithologist. He also collaborated with other ornithologists including James Bond. Danforth also collected insects from across the region and established the insect collections at the University. His student José Andrés Ramos Alemar became the first entomologist in Puerto Rico. His tuberculosis forced him to move to his maternal home in West Boylston, Massachusetts, where he died. In his will, he wished that his bird books and library be sold and the proceeds donated to the American Ornithological Union.
