= Bill Murray (baseball) =

American baseball player (1893-1943)

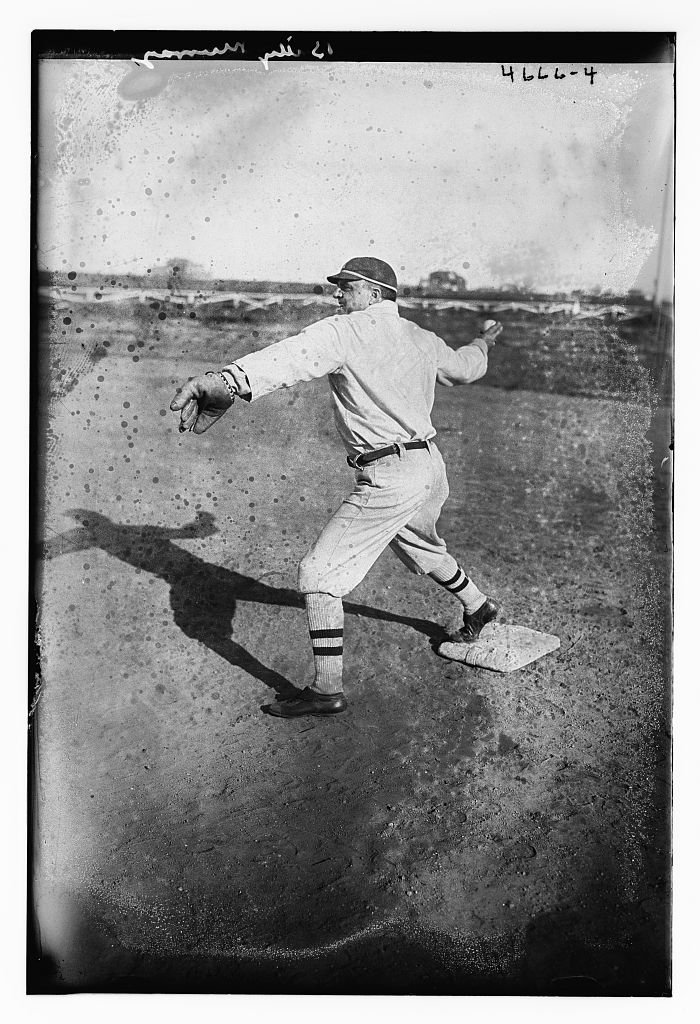
- Second baseman
- Born: September 6, 1893; Vinalhaven, Maine, U.S.
- Died: September 14, 1943 (aged 50); Boston, Massachusetts, U.S.
- Batted: Switch Threw: Right

MLB debut
- June 27, 1917, for the Washington Senators

Last MLB appearance
- September 21, 1917, for the Washington Senators

MLB statistics
- Batting average: .143
- Home runs: 0
- Runs batted in: 4
- Stats at Baseball Reference

Teams
- Washington Senators (1917)

William Allenwood Murray (September 6, 1893 – September 14, 1943) was an American professional baseball infielder. In 1917, he played in 8 games with the Washington Senators of Major League Baseball. In 21 at-bats, Murray had no home runs, 4 RBIs and a stolen base. Murray attended Brown University in Providence, Rhode Island and the College of the Holy Cross in Worcester, Massachusetts.

== Minor leagues and later life ==
In 1917, Murray played with the Toronto Maple Leafs of the International League. In 1919, he played with the Springfield Ponies and the New Haven Weissmen of the Eastern League. Murray played the 1920 season with the Bridgeport Americans and the 1921 season with the Hartford Senators.

After his baseball career ended, Murray attended the Boston University School of Law and was head coach of the school's baseball team. In 1925, he was the head baseball coach at Williams College.

Murray died in 1943 at the age of 50 and was buried in Mount St. Benedict Cemetery in Bloomfield, Connecticut.
