= Dallas Bradshaw =

American baseball player (1895-1939)

- Second baseman
- Born: November 23, 1895; Wolf Creek, Illinois, U.S.
- Died: December 11, 1939 (aged 44); Herrin, Illinois, U.S.
- Batted: Left Threw: Right

MLB debut
- June 5, 1917, for the Philadelphia Athletics

Last MLB appearance
- June 9, 1917, for the Philadelphia Athletics

MLB statistics
- Games played: 2
- At bats: 4
- Strikeouts: 1
- Stats at Baseball Reference

Teams
- Philadelphia Athletics (1917)

Dallas Carl Bradshaw (November 23, 1895 – December 11, 1939), nicknamed "Windy", was an American second baseman who played one season in Major League Baseball (MLB) with the Philadelphia Athletics. He was 5'7" and weighed 145 lbs.
