= Jack Enright =

American baseball player (1895-1975)

- Pitcher
- Born: November 29, 1895; Fort Worth, Texas, U.S.
- Died: August 18, 1975 (aged 79); Pompano Beach, Florida, U.S.
- Batted: Right Threw: Right

MLB debut
- September 26, 1917, for the New York Yankees

Last MLB appearance
- September 26, 1917, for the New York Yankees

MLB statistics
- Win–loss record: 0–1
- Earned run average: 5.40
- Strikeouts: 1
- Stats at Baseball Reference

Teams
- New York Yankees (1917)

Jackson Percy Enright (November 29, 1895 – August 18, 1975) was an American Major League Baseball pitcher. Enright played for the New York Yankees in 1917. In 1 career game, he had a 0–1 record with a 5.40 ERA. He batted and threw right-handed.

Enright was born in Fort Worth, Texas and died in Pompano Beach, Florida.
