= Carl Weilman =

American baseball player (1889–1924)

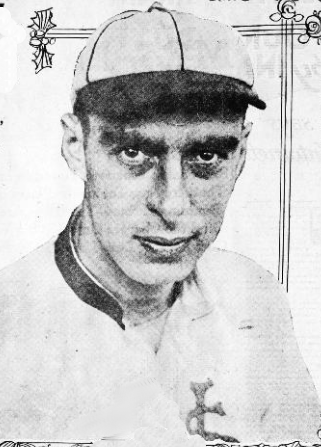
- Weilman, c. 1915
- Pitcher
- Born: November 29, 1889; Hamilton, Ohio, U.S.
- Died: May 25, 1924 (aged 34); Hamilton, Ohio, U.S.
- Batted: Left Threw: Left

MLB debut
- August 24, 1912, for the St. Louis Browns

Last MLB appearance
- September 29, 1920, for the St. Louis Browns

MLB statistics
- Win–loss record: 84–93
- Earned run average: 2.67
- Strikeouts: 536
- Stats at Baseball Reference

Teams
- St. Louis Browns (1912–1917, 1919–1920)

Carl Woolworth Weilman (November 29, 1889 – May 25, 1924) was an American professional baseball pitcher in the Major Leagues from 1912–1920. He played for the St. Louis Browns. At the time, he was the tallest pitcher in the American League at 6 ft 5 1/2 in (1.97 m). Weilman is one of the few players in baseball history to strike out six times in one game, and the first player recorded to have done so.

Weilman died on May 25, 1924 in Hamilton, Ohio of tuberculosis caused by an episode of the flu in Spring Training 1924 while working as a scout for the Browns.
