= Kewpie Pennington =

American baseball player (1896–1953)

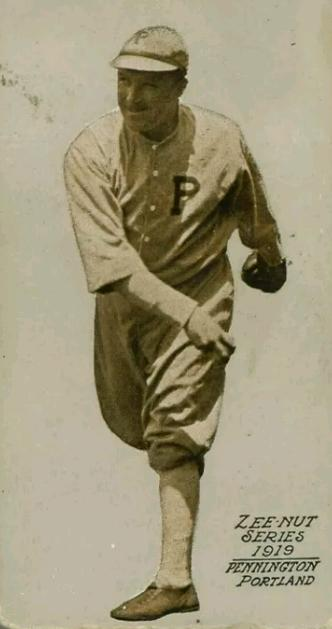
- Pitcher
- Born: September 24, 1896; New York City, U.S.
- Died: May 3, 1953 (aged 56); Newark, New Jersey, U.S.
- Batted: Right Threw: Right

MLB debut
- April 14, 1917, for the St. Louis Browns

Last MLB appearance
- April 14, 1917, for the St. Louis Browns

MLB statistics
- Games pitched: 1
- Innings pitched: 1.0
- Earned run average: 0.00
- Stats at Baseball Reference

Teams
- St. Louis Browns (1917)

George Louis "Kewpie" Pennington (September 24, 1896 – May 3, 1953) was an American professional baseball pitcher who played in one game for the St. Louis Browns of Major League Baseball on April 14, 1917. He had a Minor League Baseball playing career that spanned from 1914 to 1923.

== Early life and career ==
Pennington was born on September 24, 1896, in New York City. Pennington attended Commercial High School in Brooklyn and pitched for the Oakland club that won the Brooklyn Amateur League 1913.

In early 1914, he was given a tryout for the National League's Brooklyn Superbas to take part in the club's spring training in Augusta, Georgia. After failing to make the club, he returned to the Oaklands in April. He then pitched for the Binghamton Bingoes of the New York State League and the York White Roses of the Tri-State League before signing with the Lawrence Barristers of the New England League in June. He played for both Lawrence and the Haverhill Hustlers of the same league during the remainder of the season, finishing the year with a 8-2 win-loss record as Lawrence won the league championship.

Pennington began the 1915 season with Lawrence before he was loaned to the New England League's Fitchburg Burghers in May. Lawrence recalled Pennington in July, but he refused to report, arguing that Lawrence failed to pay him while he was away from the club and that he had signed a new contract with Fitchburg. After being suspended by the league and ordered to report to Lawrence on August 9, he rejoined the club on August 30 for the remainder of the season. He pitched for Lawrence again in 1916 and received the attention of major league scouts from the Pittsburgh Pirates, New York Giants and Detroit Tigers. Philadelphia Athletics manager Connie Mack was in attendance for a game in August in which Pennington gave up 11 hits and six runs.

Pennington joined the St. Louis Browns for spring training in 1917. On April 14, Pennington made his only major league appearance, pitching the final inning for the Browns in a game where the Chicago White Sox's Eddie Cicotte threw a no-hitter to beat the Browns 11–0. In May, he was acquired by the Newark Bears of the International League. In 25 games for Newark, he had a 11-10 win-loss record with a 2.28 earned run average.

In January 1918, he was sent to the Mobile Bears of the Southern Association. He quit the team in May and played for Fore River Shipyard, Morse Dry Dock and Repair Company and Staten Island Shipbuilding baseball clubs. He was purchased by the Portland Beavers of the Pacific Coast League on February 14, 1919. He pitched in nine games for Portland, but quit the team in June. After playing semi-pro ball in Brooklyn the remainder of 1919, Portland surrendered their rights to Pennington for 1920 and he joined the Hartford Senators of the Eastern League. He pitched for Hartford from 1920 to 1922, winning 44 games over three seasons and posting an ERA below 1.85 in both 1920 and 1921. Pennington refused to report to Hartford in the spring on 1923, and instead signed with the semi-pro Newark Meadobrooks. Hartford sold Pennington to the Eastern League's Springfield Ponies in late May. He quit the club multiple times during the season and ended the year with a 0-6 record in eight games pitched. Springfield express interest in bringing Pennington back for 1924, but he did not return to professional baseball.

Pennington died on May 3, 1953 in Newark, New Jersey.
