= Otto Neu =

American baseball player (1894-1932)

- Shortstop
- Born: September 24, 1894; Springfield, Ohio, U.S.
- Died: September 19, 1932 (aged 37); Kenton, Ohio, U.S.
- Batted: Right Threw: Right

MLB debut
- July 10, 1917, for the St. Louis Browns

Last MLB appearance
- July 10, 1917, for the St. Louis Browns

MLB statistics
- Games played: 1
- Stats at Baseball Reference

Teams
- St. Louis Browns (1917)

Otto Adam Neu (September 24, 1894 – September 19, 1932) was an American shortstop who played briefly in Major League Baseball during the 1917 season. Listed at 5 ft 11 in (1.80 m), 170 lb., Neu batted and threw right-handed. He was born in Springfield, Ohio.

Neu was a major leaguer whose career, statistically speaking, was similar to that of Moonlight Graham. Previously, he had played minor league baseball for the Senators, Indians and Browns organizations, and made his majors debut on July 10, 1917 with the Browns, appearing for them in a game against the Yankees at Sportsman's Park.

But Neu did not have a fielding chance or turn at-bat, and never appeared in a major league game again. Following his playing retirement he worked as a salesman.

Neu died of intestinal influenza in Kenton, Ohio, five days short of his 38th birthday.

== Legacy ==
The fantasy baseball platform Ottoneu derives its name from Otto Neu.

== Sources ==
- Career statistics from Baseball Reference · Retrosheet · Baseball Almanac
- 1917 St. Louis Browns
- The Deadball Era
