= Tony Rego =

American baseball player

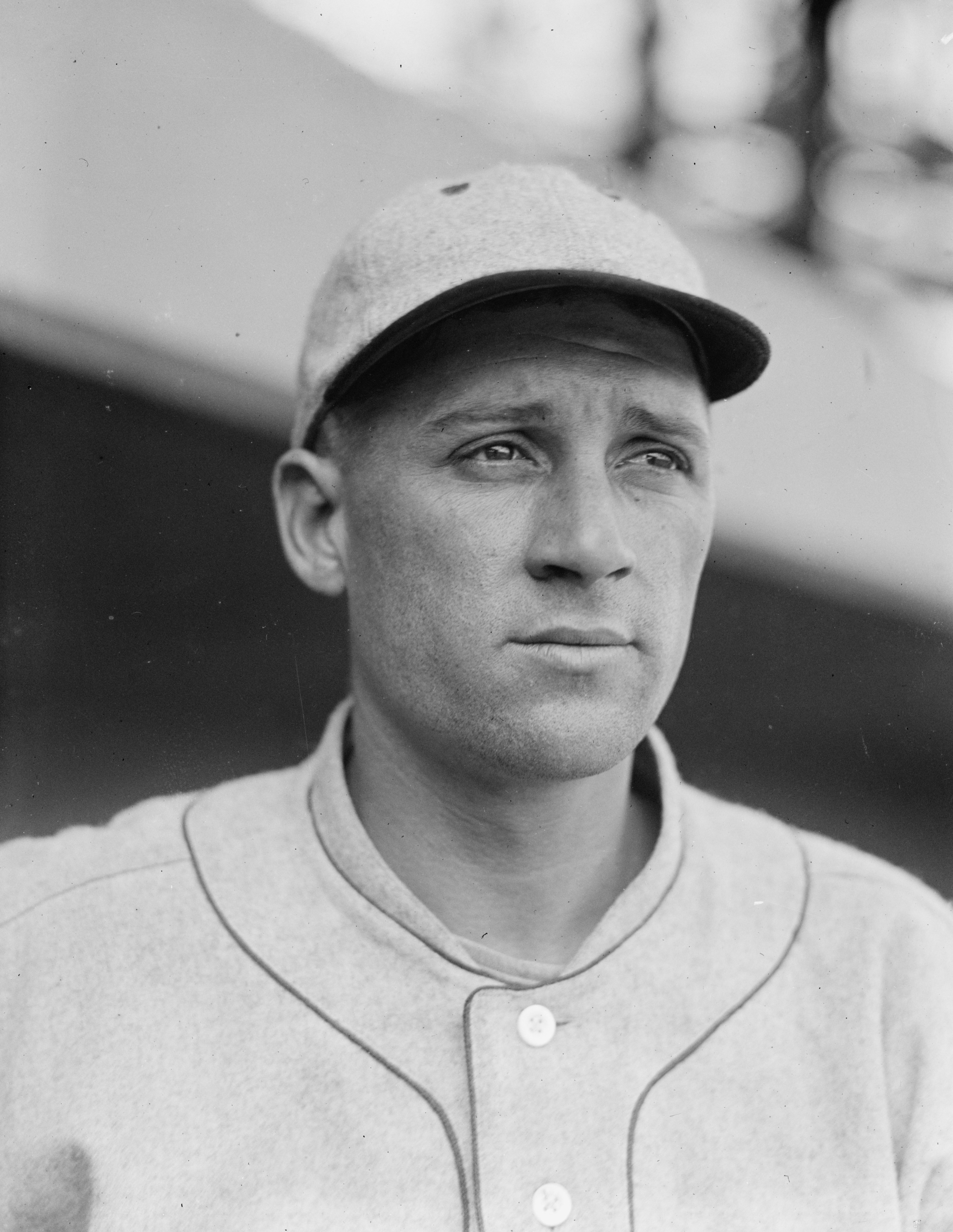
- Catcher
- Born: October 31, 1897; Wailuku, Hawaii Territory
- Died: January 6, 1978 (aged 80); Tulsa, Oklahoma, U.S.
- Batted: Right Threw: Right

MLB debut
- June 21, 1924, for the St. Louis Browns

Last MLB appearance
- September 23, 1925, for the St. Louis Browns

MLB statistics
- Batting average: .286
- Home runs: 0
- Runs batted in: 8
- Stats at Baseball Reference

Teams
- St. Louis Browns (1924–1925)

Antone Rego (October 31, 1897 – January 6, 1978) was an American Major League Baseball catcher who played in 1924 and 1925 with the St. Louis Browns. He was born as Antone DoRego.

Rego was one of the only players to come from Hawaii for nearly 80 years. He was of Portuguese heritage and could play the ukulele.

He played for 44 games with the Browns in 1924 and 1925, mostly as a backup player.
