= Ed Murray (baseball) =

American baseball player (1895-1970)

- Shortstop
- Born: May 8, 1895; Mystic, Connecticut
- Died: November 8, 1970 (aged 75); Cheyenne, Wyoming
- Batted: Right Threw: Right

MLB debut
- June 24, 1917, for the St. Louis Browns

Last MLB appearance
- June 24, 1917, for the St. Louis Browns

MLB statistics
- Games played: 1
- At bats: 1
- Hit(s): 0
- Stats at Baseball Reference

Teams
- St. Louis Browns (1917)

Edward Francis Murray (May 8, 1895 – November 8, 1970), born in Mystic, Connecticut, was an American Major League Baseball shortstop who played in one game for the St. Louis Browns on June 24, 1917. He struck out in his only at bat.

Murray stood only 5 feet and 6 inches tall, yet he was known for his power during his brief time in the MLB.

Murray died in Cheyenne, Wyoming on November 8, 1970.
