= Cliff Hill (baseball) =

American baseball player (1893–1938)

- Pitcher
- Born: January 20, 1893; Marshall, Texas, U.S.
- Died: August 11, 1938 (aged 45); El Paso, Texas, U.S.
- Batted: Both Threw: Left

MLB debut
- April 21, 1917, for the Philadelphia Athletics

Last MLB appearance
- April 21, 1917, for the Philadelphia Athletics

MLB statistics
- Win–loss record: 0–0
- Earned run average: 6.75
- Strikeouts: 0
- Stats at Baseball Reference

Teams
- Philadelphia Athletics (1917)

Clifford Joseph Hill (January 20, 1893 – August 11, 1938) was an American Major League Baseball pitcher. He played for the Philadelphia Athletics during the 1917 season.
