= Tom Richardson (pinch hitter) =

American baseball player

- Pinch hitter
- Born: August 7, 1883; Louisville, Illinois
- Died: November 15, 1939 (aged 56); Onawa, Iowa
- Batted: Right Threw: Right

MLB debut
- August 2, 1917, for the St. Louis Browns

Last MLB appearance
- August 2, 1917, for the St. Louis Browns

MLB statistics
- Games played: 1
- At bats: 1
- Hit(s): 0
- Stats at Baseball Reference

Teams
- St. Louis Browns (1917)

Thomas Mitchell Richardson (August 7, 1883 – November 15, 1939) was an American Major League Baseball player who pinch hit for the St. Louis Browns on August 2, 1917. He went 0–1.
