= Deacon Jones (pitcher) =

American baseball player (1892–1952)

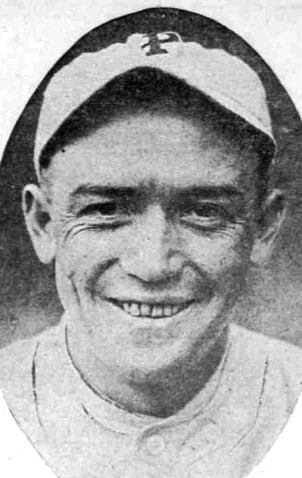
- Pitcher
- Born: December 20, 1892; Arcadia, Kansas, U.S.
- Died: December 28, 1952 (aged 60); Pittsburg, Kansas, U.S.
- Batted: Right Threw: Right

MLB debut
- September 23, 1916, for the Detroit Tigers

Last MLB appearance
- August 30, 1918, for the Detroit Tigers

MLB statistics
- Win–loss record: 7-6
- Earned run average: 2.98
- Strikeouts: 45
- Stats at Baseball Reference

Teams
- Detroit Tigers (1916–1918)

Carroll Elmer "Deacon" Jones (December 20, 1892 – December 28, 1952) was a professional baseball player who played pitcher in the Major Leagues from 1916 to 1918. He played for the Detroit Tigers.
