= Jim Scott (pitcher) =

American baseball player and umpire (1888–1957)

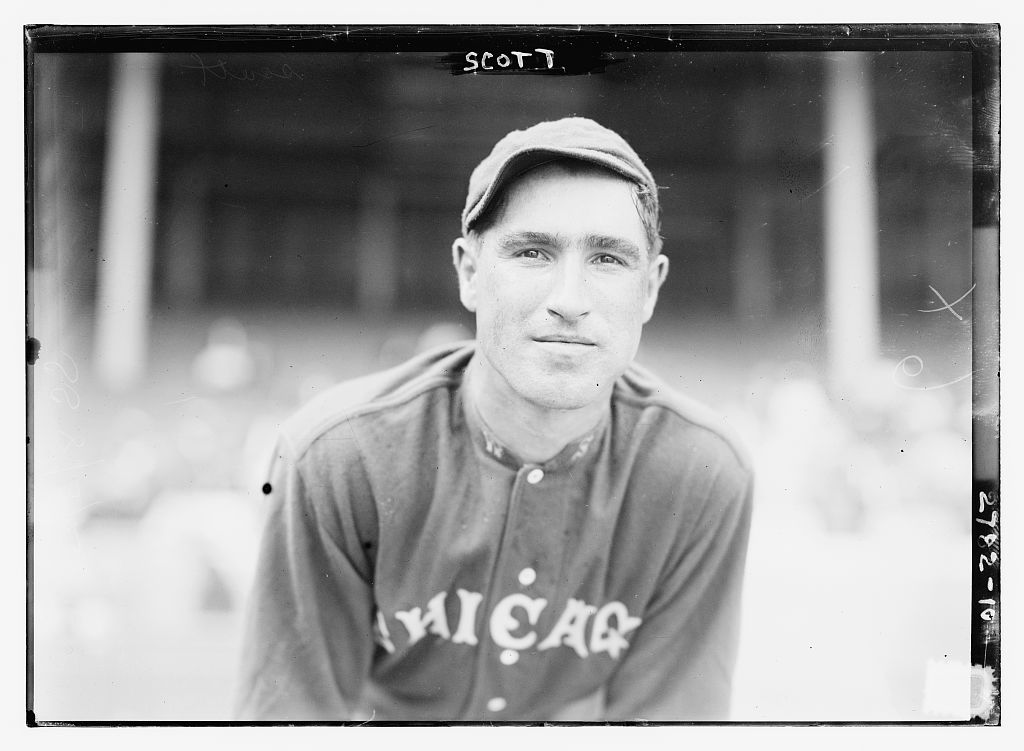
- Pitcher
- Born: April 23, 1888; Deadwood, South Dakota, U.S.
- Died: April 7, 1957 (aged 68); Jacumba, California, U.S.
- Batted: Right Threw: Right

MLB debut
- April 25, 1909, for the Chicago White Sox

Last MLB appearance
- August 17, 1917, for the Chicago White Sox

MLB statistics
- Win–loss record: 107–114
- Earned run average: 2.30
- Strikeouts: 945
- Stats at Baseball Reference

Teams
- Chicago White Sox (1909–1917)

Career highlights and awards
- World Series champion (1917)

James "Death Valley Jim" Scott (April 23, 1888 – April 7, 1957) was an American pitcher for the Chicago White Sox (1909–1917). Scott umpired in the minor leagues and in the National League (NL) after his playing career.

== Biography ==
Jim Scott was born in Deadwood, South Dakota. He was the first Major League Baseball player to be born in South Dakota. He was an alumnus of Nebraska Wesleyan University.

Scott finished 14th in voting for the 1913 American League Most Valuable Player. He led the league in games started (38) and finished with a 20–21 win–loss record, 25 complete games, four shutouts and a 1.90 earned run average (ERA). He led the league in shutouts in 1915 and helped the White Sox win the 1917 World Series. In nine seasons, Scott pitched 317 games (226 starts) and earned a 107–114 win–loss record with 123 complete games. As of 2023, He ranks 19th all-time in career ERA (2.30), 118th in career WHIP (1.18), and 68th in hits allowed per nine innings (7.73).

During the 1913 and 1914 seasons, Scott set a major league record by pitching 39 consecutive starts in which he allowed three or fewer earned runs. His record was tied, and then broken, by Jacob deGrom in 2022.

In 1918 Scott served in the military during World War I. He also held technical roles in the film industry for many years, beginning with movie work in the baseball offseasons. Scott was an umpire for several years after his playing days. He umpired in the Southern Association in 1928 and 1929, in the NL in 1930 and 1931, and in the Southern Association again the following year. After the 1932 season, Scott quit umpiring and pursued full-time work on motion picture sets until 1953.

He died in Jacumba, California at the age of 68.
