= Scrappy Moore (baseball) =

American baseball player

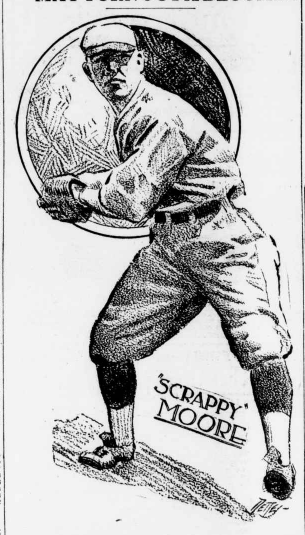
- Third baseman
- Born: December 16, 1892; St. Louis, Missouri
- Died: October 13, 1964 (aged 71); Little Rock, Arkansas
- Batted: Right Threw: Right

MLB debut
- June 21, 1917, for the St. Louis Browns

Last MLB appearance
- July 5, 1917, for the St. Louis Browns

MLB statistics
- Batting average: .125
- Home runs: 0
- Runs batted in: 0
- Stats at Baseball Reference

Teams
- St. Louis Browns (1917)

William Allen "Scrappy" Moore (December 16, 1892 – October 13, 1964) was a college baseball player at Georgia Tech and Vanderbilt as well as a professional baseball player. He appeared in four games for the St. Louis Browns in 1917, primarily as a third baseman. He played for the Atlanta team of the Southern Association from 1918 to 1919, and with the Little Rock Travelers in 1920.

== Sources ==
- Career statistics from Baseball Reference, or Baseball Reference (Minors)
