= Ed Klepfer =

American baseball player (1888–1950)

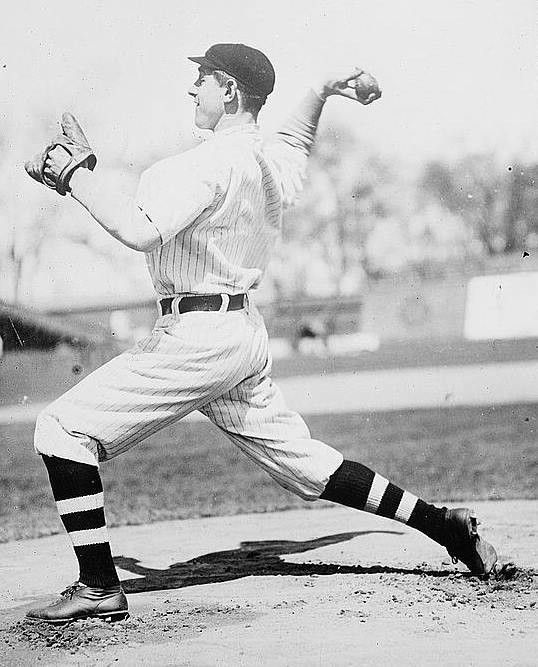
- Pitcher
- Born: March 17, 1888; Summerville, Pennsylvania, U.S.
- Died: August 9, 1950 (aged 62); Tulsa, Oklahoma, U.S.
- Batted: Right Threw: Right

MLB debut
- July 11, 1911, for the New York Highlanders

Last MLB appearance
- September 5, 1919, for the Cleveland Indians

MLB statistics
- Earned run average: 2.81
- Win–loss record: 22–17
- Strikeouts: 165
- Stats at Baseball Reference

Teams
- New York Highlanders\Yankees (1911,1913); Chicago White Sox (1915); Cleveland Indians (1915–1917,1919)

Career highlights and awards
- Had the best win-lost percentage in 1917 at .778.

Edward Lloyd Klepfer (March 17, 1888 – August 9, 1950) was an American spitball pitcher in Major League Baseball who played for the New York Yankees, Chicago White Sox and Cleveland Indians in a span of six seasons between 1911 and 1919.

Klepfer, commonly known as "Big Ed", was born on March 17, 1888, in Summerville, Pennsylvania. He batted and threw right-handed and was also 6 ft 0 in (1.83 m), 180 pounds, and attended Penn State University.

Klepfer made his big league debut on July 4, 1911, with the Highlanders. His career was chopped up due to time spent fighting in World War I, as part of the American Expeditionary Forces in France. At one time in his war fighting tenure, he was gassed.

Perhaps the most extraordinary part of his career was his second to last season-1917. He went 14–4 with a 2.37 ERA in 213 innings. He finished his career with a 22–17 record and a 2.98 ERA in 98 games.

Klepfer in 125 career at-bats, he collected 6 hits for a paltry .048 batting average.

He played his last game on September 5, 1919.

After baseball, Klepfer became an independent oil operator and then in 1946 went to work for C.W. Titus, an oilman in Tulsa, Oklahoma. Klepfer died on August 9, 1950, in a hospital in Tulsa. His body was buried at Rose Hill Cemetery.

== Major transaction ==
On August 21, 1915, the White Sox traded Klepfer along with Larry Chappell, Braggo Roth and cash for Shoeless Joe Jackson.
