= Ernie Koob =

American baseball player (1892–1941)

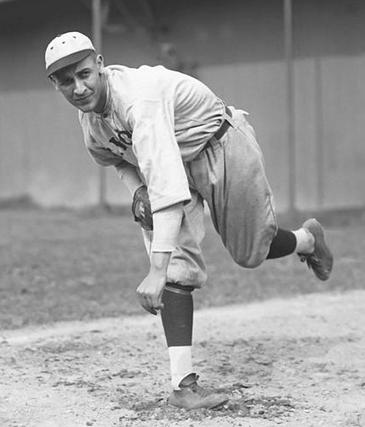
- Pitcher
- Born: September 11, 1892; Keeler, Michigan, U.S.
- Died: November 12, 1941 (aged 49); Lemay, Missouri, U.S.
- Batted: Left Threw: Left

MLB debut
- June 23, 1915, for the St. Louis Browns

Last MLB appearance
- August 30, 1919, for the St. Louis Browns

MLB statistics
- Win–loss record: 23–31
- Earned run average: 3.13
- Strikeouts: 121
- Stats at Baseball Reference

Teams
- St. Louis Browns (1915–1917, 1919)

Career highlights and awards
- Pitched a no-hitter on May 5, 1917

Ernest Gerald Koob (September 11, 1892 – November 12, 1941) was an American professional baseball player who played pitcher in the Major Leagues from 1915 to 1919 for the St. Louis Browns. On May 5, 1917, Koob no-hit the eventual World Champion Chicago White Sox 1–0, besting Eddie Cicotte—himself a no-hit pitcher against the Browns less than a month earlier, on April 14. The very next day, his teammate Bob Groom also no-hit the White Sox, 3–0 in the second game of a doubleheader; to date, Koob and Groom are the only teammates to pitch no-hitters on consecutive days.

Koob attended college at Western State Normal School.

An obituary published in the November 1941 issue of The Sporting News contained statements which complement and to some extent contradict the above information. It states that Koob was born in St. Louis in 1894; that he died in the Mount St. Rose Sanatorium (St. Louis) on 12 November 1941, of a lung ailment; that he played baseball under the name "Smith" while attending Kalamazoo State College; that he served in the US Army during The Great War; and that he played with the Browns until 1920.

== See also ==
- List of Major League Baseball no-hitters

Preceded by Fred Toney	No-hitter pitcher May 5, 1917	Succeeded by Bob Groom
