= Bob Groom =

American baseball player (1884–1948)

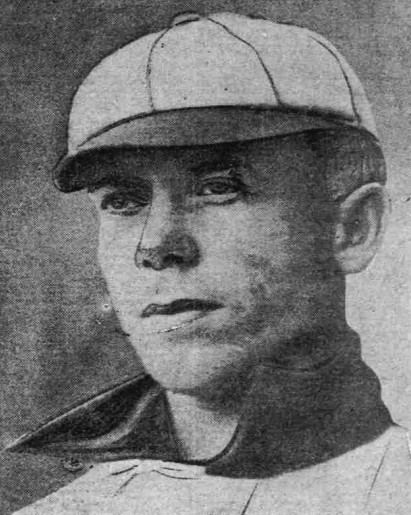
- Pitcher
- Born: September 12, 1884; Belleville, Illinois, U.S.
- Died: February 19, 1948 (aged 63); Belleville, Illinois, U.S.
- Batted: Right Threw: Right

MLB debut
- April 13, 1909, for the Washington Senators

Last MLB appearance
- July 20, 1918, for the Cleveland Indians

MLB statistics
- Win–loss record: 119–150
- Earned run average: 3.10
- Strikeouts: 1,159
- Stats at Baseball Reference

Teams
- Washington Senators (1909–1913); St. Louis Terriers (1914–1915); St. Louis Browns (1916–1917); Cleveland Indians (1918)

Career highlights and awards
- Pitched a no-hitter on May 6, 1917

Robert Groom (September 12, 1884 – February 19, 1948) was an American professional baseball player who played as a pitcher in two midwest minor leagues and the Pacific Coast League from 1904 to 1908, and then in the Major Leagues from 1909 to 1918. He pitched for the Washington Senators (1909–1913), St. Louis Terriers (Federal League, 1914–1915), St. Louis Browns (1916–1917), and Cleveland Indians (1918).

== Biography ==
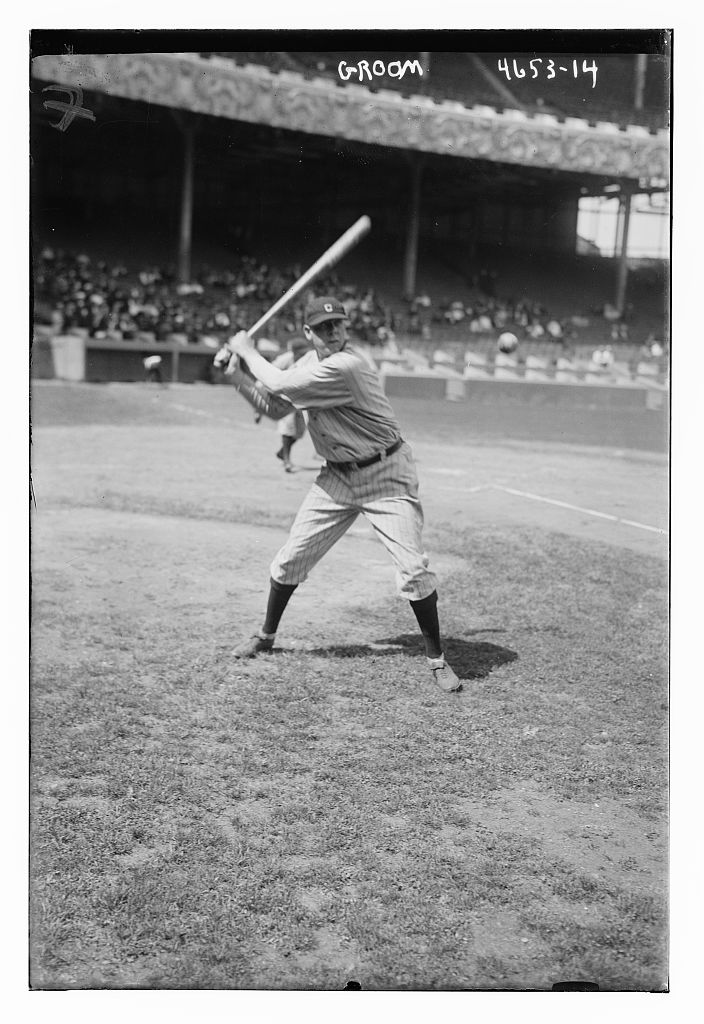
Groom as a member of the Cleveland Indians in 1918.

Groom's best major league season was with the 1912 Senators, when he won 24 games and Washington finished second in the American League. During his debut season, Groom became the first pitcher to achieve 19 consecutive losses in a season, a record which was equalled in 1916 by Jack Nabors.

In September 1916, Groom was also involved in a confrontation with George Sisler, the Browns' normally mild-mannered first baseman. After an inning in which Sisler missed a high throw to first base, Groom yelled, "Listen, you...college boy, you run harder for those...balls. Where the hell do you think you are, at a...tea party?" Pale-faced, Sisler stared momentarily at Groom, then strolled over and punched the pitcher in the mouth with his left fist. Groom never yelled at his teammate again.

On May 6, 1917, while with the Browns, Groom no-hit the eventual World Champion Chicago White Sox 3–0. The no-hitter came in the second game of Sunday double-header, after Groom preserved the win in the first game, pitching the last two innings without allowing a hit. It also came the day after teammate Ernie Koob's 1–0 no-hitter against the White Sox; to date, Koob and Groom are the only teammates to pitch no-hitters on consecutive days.

After the 1918 season, Bob Groom returned to Belleville, where he managed his family's coal mining operation and, in the summers, pitched for and managed local teams into the 1920s, most notably Belleville's White Rose team. Throughout the 1920s and 1930s he was involved with the St. Louis Trolley League as a mentor, and in 1938, he was asked by the George E. Hilgard American Legion Post 58 to form Belleville's first tournament team. He did and coached them to the state and regional championships in their first season. He led the "Hilgards" through 1944, and for his role in founding the team was inducted into the Hilgard Hall of Fame in February 2008. A marker in his honor, part of a series that grew out of the Society for American Baseball Research (SABR) Deadball Stars books, was presented on June 5, 2008, at the Belleville Hilgards' home ballpark, Whitey Herzog Field.

== See also ==
- List of Major League Baseball no-hitters
- List of people with surname Groom

Achievements
Preceded by Ernie Koob	No-hitter pitcher August 6, 1917	Succeeded by Babe Ruth & Ernie Shore
