= Dave Danforth =

American baseball player (1890–1970)

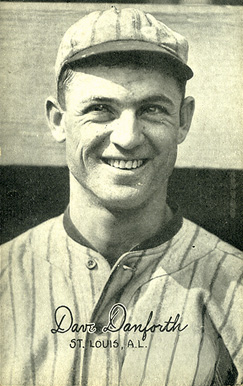
- 1922 baseball card of Danforth
- Pitcher
- Born: March 7, 1890; Granger, Texas, U.S.
- Died: September 19, 1970 (aged 80); Baltimore, Maryland, U.S.
- Batted: Left Threw: Left

MLB debut
- August 1, 1911, for the Philadelphia Athletics

Last MLB appearance
- October 1, 1925, for the St. Louis Browns

MLB statistics
- Win–loss record: 71–66
- Earned run average: 3.89
- Strikeouts: 484
- Stats at Baseball Reference

Teams
- Philadelphia Athletics (1911–1912); Chicago White Sox (1916–1919); St. Louis Browns (1922–1925)

Career highlights and awards
- 2× World Series champion (1911, 1917)

David Charles "Dauntless Dave" Danforth (March 7, 1890 – September 19, 1970) was an American professional baseball pitcher. He played in Major League Baseball (MLB) for ten seasons (1911–1912, 1916–1919, 1922–1925) with the Philadelphia Athletics, Chicago White Sox, and St. Louis Browns. For his career, he compiled a 71–66 record in 286 appearances, with a 3.89 earned run average and 484 strikeouts. Danforth played on two World Series championship teams, the 1911 Athletics and the 1917 White Sox. He appeared in one World Series game (in 1917), pitching one inning, giving up two runs and striking out two.

Danforth was an alumnus of Baylor University. He pitched two seasons at Baylor and pitched two no-hitters as a collegiate. In 1911 he led Baylor to the Texas championship with a 10-0 win–loss record. He had agreed to join the Athletics for the 1911 season over the winter of 1910–11, but held off signing his professional contract until graduating from Baylor, joining the Athletics in July. The 1912 Reach Guide described him as a "clever young pitcher" and said that the Athletics were "fortunate" in his "gradual development" in their pursuit of the 1911 league championship.

He was known for adulterating baseballs and throwing "shiners". A 1920 rule change banned this practice and Danforth's career suffered following the rule change. After retiring from baseball, he worked as a dentist.

He was born in Granger, Texas and died in Baltimore, Maryland at the age of 80. He is buried in Loudon Park Cemetery in Baltimore.

== See also ==
- List of Major League Baseball annual saves leaders
