= 1918 Philadelphia Athletics season =

1918 Philadelphia Athletics
- League: American League
- Ballpark: Shibe Park
- City: Philadelphia
- Record: 52–76 (.406)
- League place: 8th
- Owners: Connie Mack, Benjamin Shibe, Tom Shibe and John Shibe
- Managers: Connie Mack

The 1918 Philadelphia Athletics season involved the A's finishing eighth in the American League with a record of 52 wins and 76 losses.

== Regular season ==
In 1918, the A's Elephant Mascot turned up on the regular uniform jersey for the first time.

=== Season standings ===
American League
| Team | W | L | Pct. | GB | Home | Road |
|---|---|---|---|---|---|---|
| Boston Red Sox | 75 | 51 | .595 | — | 49‍–‍21 | 26‍–‍30 |
| Cleveland Indians | 73 | 54 | .575 | 2½ | 38‍–‍22 | 35‍–‍32 |
| Washington Senators | 72 | 56 | .562 | 4 | 41‍–‍32 | 31‍–‍24 |
| New York Yankees | 60 | 63 | .488 | 13½ | 37‍–‍29 | 23‍–‍34 |
| St. Louis Browns | 58 | 64 | .475 | 15 | 23‍–‍30 | 35‍–‍34 |
| Chicago White Sox | 57 | 67 | .460 | 17 | 30‍–‍26 | 27‍–‍41 |
| Detroit Tigers | 55 | 71 | .437 | 20 | 28‍–‍29 | 27‍–‍42 |
| Philadelphia Athletics | 52 | 76 | .406 | 24 | 35‍–‍32 | 17‍–‍44 |

=== Record vs. opponents ===
1918 American League record Sources:
| Team | BOS | CWS | CLE | DET | NYY | PHA | SLB | WSH |
|---|---|---|---|---|---|---|---|---|
| Boston | — | 12–7 | 10–10 | 13–5 | 6–11 | 13–6 | 14–5 | 7–7 |
| Chicago | 7–12 | — | 10–11 | 6–10 | 12–6 | 11–10 | 5–5 | 6–13 |
| Cleveland | 10–10 | 11–10 | — | 10–3 | 11–7–1 | 13–7–1 | 10–6 | 8–11 |
| Detroit | 5–13 | 10–6 | 3–10 | — | 9–10–1 | 9–11 | 10–10 | 9–11–1 |
| New York | 11–6 | 6–12 | 7–11–1 | 10–9–1 | — | 8–4 | 10–10–1 | 8–11 |
| Philadelphia | 6–13 | 10–11 | 7–13–1 | 11–9 | 4–8 | — | 8–10 | 6–12–1 |
| St. Louis | 5–14 | 5–5 | 6–10 | 10–10 | 10–10–1 | 10–8 | — | 12–7 |
| Washington | 7–7 | 13–6 | 11–8 | 11–9–1 | 11–8 | 12–6–1 | 7–12 | — |

=== Roster ===
1918 Philadelphia Athletics
Roster
| Pitchers: Willie Adams; Lou Bauer; Bob Geary; Vean Gregg; Chick Holmes; Roy Johnson; Vic Keen; Elmer Myers; Scott Perry; William Pierson; Red Shea; Mule Watson; Tom Zachary | Catchers: Wickey McAvoy; Cy Perkins; Infielders: George Burns; Claude Davidson; Joe Dugan; Jimmy Dykes; Larry Gardner; Red Shannon | Outfielders: Merito Acosta; Frank Fahey; Charlie Jamieson; Merlin Kopp; Jake Munch; Rube Oldring; Tilly Walker | Manager: Connie Mack |

== Player stats ==
| = Indicates team leader |

| = Indicates league leader |

=== Batting ===
==== Starters by position ====
Note: Pos = Position; G = Games played; AB = At bats; H = Hits; Avg. = Batting average; HR = Home runs; RBI = Runs batted in

| Pos | Player | G | AB | H | Avg. | HR | RBI |
|---|---|---|---|---|---|---|---|
| C | Wickey McAvoy | 83 | 271 | 66 | .244 | 0 | 32 |
| 1B | George Burns | 130 | 505 | 178 | .352 | 6 | 70 |
| 2B | Jimmy Dykes | 59 | 186 | 35 | .188 | 0 | 13 |
| SS | Joe Dugan | 121 | 411 | 80 | .195 | 3 | 34 |
| 3B | Larry Gardner | 127 | 463 | 132 | .285 | 1 | 52 |
| OF | Tilly Walker | 114 | 414 | 122 | .295 | 11* | 48 |
| OF | Merlin Kopp | 96 | 363 | 85 | .234 | 0 | 18 |
| OF | Charlie Jamieson | 110 | 416 | 84 | .202 | 0 | 11 |

- Tied with Babe Ruth (Boston Red Sox)

==== Other batters ====
Note: G = Games played; AB = At bats; H = Hits; Avg. = Batting average; HR = Home runs; RBI = Runs batted in

| Player | G | AB | H | Avg. | HR | RBI |
|---|---|---|---|---|---|---|
| Red Shannon | 72 | 225 | 54 | .240 | 0 | 16 |
| Cy Perkins | 68 | 218 | 41 | .188 | 1 | 14 |
| Merito Acosta | 49 | 169 | 51 | .302 | 0 | 14 |
| Rube Oldring | 49 | 133 | 31 | .233 | 0 | 11 |
| Claude Davidson | 31 | 81 | 15 | .185 | 0 | 4 |
| Jake Munch | 22 | 30 | 8 | .267 | 0 | 0 |
| Frank Fahey | 10 | 17 | 3 | .176 | 0 | 1 |

=== Pitching ===
==== Starting pitchers ====
Note: G = Games pitched; IP = Innings pitched; W = Wins; L = Losses; ERA = Earned run average; SO = Strikeouts

| Player | G | IP | W | L | ERA | SO |
|---|---|---|---|---|---|---|
| Scott Perry | 44 | 332.1 | 20 | 19* | 1.98 | 81 |
| Vean Gregg | 30 | 199.1 | 9 | 14 | 3.12 | 63 |
| Mule Watson | 21 | 141.2 | 7 | 10 | 3.37 | 30 |
| Elmer Myers | 18 | 95.1 | 4 | 8 | 4.63 | 17 |
| Roy Johnson | 10 | 50.0 | 1 | 5 | 3.42 | 12 |
| Vic Keen | 1 | 8.0 | 0 | 1 | 3.38 | 1 |
| Tom Zachary | 2 | 8.0 | 2 | 0 | 5.63 | 1 |

- Tied with Eddie Cicotte (Chicago White Sox)

==== Other pitchers ====
Note: G = Games pitched; IP = Innings pitched; W = Wins; L = Losses; ERA = Earned run average; SO = Strikeouts

| Player | G | IP | W | L | ERA | SO |
|---|---|---|---|---|---|---|
| Willie Adams | 32 | 169.0 | 5 | 12 | 4.42 | 39 |
| Bob Geary | 16 | 87.0 | 2 | 5 | 2.69 | 22 |
| Charlie Jamieson | 5 | 23.0 | 2 | 1 | 4.30 | 2 |
| William Pierson | 8 | 21.2 | 0 | 1 | 3.32 | 6 |

==== Relief pitchers ====
Note: G = Games pitched; W = Wins; L = Losses; SV = Saves; ERA = Earned run average; SO = Strikeouts

| Player | G | W | L | SV | ERA | SO |
|---|---|---|---|---|---|---|
| Red Shea | 3 | 0 | 0 | 0 | 4.00 | 2 |
| Frank Fahey | 3 | 0 | 0 | 0 | 6.00 | 1 |
| Chick Holmes | 2 | 0 | 0 | 0 | 13.50 | 0 |
| Wickey McAvoy | 2 | 0 | 0 | 0 | 13.50 | 0 |
| Lou Bauer | 1 | 0 | 0 | 0 | inf | 0 |
