= 1918 Washington Senators season =

1918 Washington Senators
- League: American League
- Ballpark: National Park
- City: Washington, D.C.
- Record: 72–56 (.563)
- League place: 3rd
- Owners: Thomas C. Noyes
- Managers: Clark Griffith

The 1918 Washington Senators won 72 games, lost 56, and finished in third place in the American League. They were managed by Clark Griffith and played home games at National Park.

== Regular season ==
=== Season standings ===
American League
Team	W	L	Pct.	GB	Home	Road
Boston Red Sox	75	51	.595	—	49‍–‍21	26‍–‍30
Cleveland Indians	73	54	.575	2½	38‍–‍22	35‍–‍32
Washington Senators	72	56	.562	4	41‍–‍32	31‍–‍24
New York Yankees	60	63	.488	13½	37‍–‍29	23‍–‍34
St. Louis Browns	58	64	.475	15	23‍–‍30	35‍–‍34
Chicago White Sox	57	67	.460	17	30‍–‍26	27‍–‍41
Detroit Tigers	55	71	.437	20	28‍–‍29	27‍–‍42
Philadelphia Athletics	52	76	.406	24	35‍–‍32	17‍–‍44

=== Record vs. opponents ===
1918 American League record Sources:
Team	BOS	CWS	CLE	DET	NYY	PHA	SLB	WSH
Boston	—	12–7	10–10	13–5	6–11	13–6	14–5	7–7
Chicago	7–12	—	10–11	6–10	12–6	11–10	5–5	6–13
Cleveland	10–10	11–10	—	10–3	11–7–1	13–7–1	10–6	8–11
Detroit	5–13	10–6	3–10	—	9–10–1	9–11	10–10	9–11–1
New York	11–6	6–12	7–11–1	10–9–1	—	8–4	10–10–1	8–11
Philadelphia	6–13	10–11	7–13–1	11–9	4–8	—	8–10	6–12–1
St. Louis	5–14	5–5	6–10	10–10	10–10–1	10–8	—	12–7
Washington	7–7	13–6	11–8	11–9–1	11–8	12–6–1	7–12	—

=== Roster ===
1918 Washington Senators
Roster
Pitchers: Nick Altrock; Doc Ayers; Ad Brennan; Garland Buckeye; Molly Craft; George Dumont; Roy Hansen; Harry Harper; Ed Hovlik; Walter Johnson; Eddie Matteson; Stan Rees; Jim Shaw; Earl Yingling	Catchers: Eddie Ainsmith; Bob Berman; Joe Casey; Val Picinich; Infielders: Eddie Foster; Joe Judge; Doc Lavan; George McBride; Ray Morgan	Outfielders: Clyde Milan; Sam Rice; Wildfire Schulte; Howie Shanks; Burt Shotton; Other batters: Merito Acosta; Patsy Gharrity	Manager: Clark Griffith

== Player stats ==
=== Batting ===
==== Starters by position ====
Note: Pos = Position; G = Games played; AB = At bats; H = Hits; Avg. = Batting average; HR = Home runs; RBI = Runs batted in

Pos	Player	G	AB	H	Avg.	HR	RBI
C	Eddie Ainsmith	96	292	62	.212	0	20
1B	Joe Judge	130	502	131	.261	1	46
2B	Ray Morgan	88	300	70	.233	0	30
SS	Doc Lavan	117	464	129	.278	0	45
3B	Eddie Foster	129	519	147	.283	0	29
OF	Frank Schulte	93	267	77	.288	0	44
OF	Clyde Milan	128	503	146	.290	0	56
OF	Burt Shotton	126	505	132	.261	0	21

==== Other batters ====
Note: G = Games played; AB = At bats; H = Hits; Avg. = Batting average; HR = Home runs; RBI = Runs batted in

Player	G	AB	H	Avg.	HR	RBI
Howie Shanks	120	436	112	.257	1	56
Val Picinich	47	148	34	.230	0	12
George McBride	18	53	7	.132	0	1
Sam Rice	7	23	8	.348	0	3
Joe Casey	9	17	4	.235	0	2
Patsy Gharrity	4	4	1	.250	0	2
Merito Acosta	3	2	0	.000	0	0
Bob Berman	2	0	0	----	0	0

=== Pitching ===
==== Starting pitchers ====
Note: G = Games pitched; IP = Innings pitched; W = Wins; L = Losses; ERA = Earned run average; SO = Strikeouts

Player	G	IP	W	L	ERA	SO
Walter Johnson	39	326.0	23	13	1.27	162
Harry Harper	35	244.0	11	10	2.18	78
Jim Shaw	41	241.1	16	12	2.42	129

==== Other pitchers ====
Note: G = Games pitched; IP = Innings pitched; W = Wins; L = Losses; ERA = Earned run average; SO = Strikeouts

Player	G	IP	W	L	ERA	SO
Doc Ayers	40	219.2	10	12	2.83	67
Eddie Matteson	14	67.2	5	3	1.73	17
Earl Yingling	5	38.0	1	2	2.13	15
Ed Hovlik	8	28.0	2	1	1.29	10
Nick Altrock	5	24.0	1	2	3.00	5
George Dumont	4	14.0	1	1	5.14	12
Ad Brennan	2	5.1	0	0	5.06	0

==== Relief pitchers ====
Note: G = Games pitched; W = Wins; L = Losses; SV = Saves; ERA = Earned run average; SO = Strikeouts

Player	G	W	L	SV	ERA	SO
Roy Hansen	5	1	0	0	3.00	2
Molly Craft	3	0	0	0	1.29	5
Stan Rees	2	1	0	0	0.00	1
Garland Buckeye	1	0	0	0	18.00	2
