= 1918 Detroit Tigers season =

Major League Baseball season

1918 Detroit Tigers
- League: American League
- Ballpark: Navin Field
- City: Detroit
- Record: 55–71 (.437)
- League place: 7th
- Owners: William H. Yawkey and Frank Navin
- Managers: Hughie Jennings

The 1918 Detroit Tigers season was a season in American baseball. The team finished seventh in the American League with a record of 55–71, 20 games behind the Boston Red Sox.

== Regular season ==
=== Season standings ===
American League
Team	W	L	Pct.	GB	Home	Road
Boston Red Sox	75	51	.595	—	49‍–‍21	26‍–‍30
Cleveland Indians	73	54	.575	2½	38‍–‍22	35‍–‍32
Washington Senators	72	56	.562	4	41‍–‍32	31‍–‍24
New York Yankees	60	63	.488	13½	37‍–‍29	23‍–‍34
St. Louis Browns	58	64	.475	15	23‍–‍30	35‍–‍34
Chicago White Sox	57	67	.460	17	30‍–‍26	27‍–‍41
Detroit Tigers	55	71	.437	20	28‍–‍29	27‍–‍42
Philadelphia Athletics	52	76	.406	24	35‍–‍32	17‍–‍44

=== Record vs. opponents ===
1918 American League record Sources:
Team	BOS	CWS	CLE	DET	NYY	PHA	SLB	WSH
Boston	—	12–7	10–10	13–5	6–11	13–6	14–5	7–7
Chicago	7–12	—	10–11	6–10	12–6	11–10	5–5	6–13
Cleveland	10–10	11–10	—	10–3	11–7–1	13–7–1	10–6	8–11
Detroit	5–13	10–6	3–10	—	9–10–1	9–11	10–10	9–11–1
New York	11–6	6–12	7–11–1	10–9–1	—	8–4	10–10–1	8–11
Philadelphia	6–13	10–11	7–13–1	11–9	4–8	—	8–10	6–12–1
St. Louis	5–14	5–5	6–10	10–10	10–10–1	10–8	—	12–7
Washington	7–7	13–6	11–8	11–9–1	11–8	12–6–1	7–12	—

=== Roster ===
1918 Detroit Tigers
Roster
Pitchers: Bill Bailey; Bernie Boland; Harry Coveleski; George Cunningham; Hooks Dauss; Bill Donovan; Ben Dyer; Eric Erickson; Happy Finneran; Charley Hall; Herb Hall; Bill James; Deacon Jones; Rudy Kallio; Willie Mitchell	Catchers: Tubby Spencer; Oscar Stanage; Archie Yelle; Infielders: Donie Bush; Jack Coffey; Jim Curry; Lee Dressen; Art Griggs; Hughie Jennings; Bob Jones; Ossie Vitt; Ralph Young	Outfielders: Ty Cobb; Babe Ellison; George Harper; Harry Heilmann; Davy Jones; Bobby Veach; Frank Walker; Other positions: Joe Cobb	Manager: Hughie Jennings; Coaches: Bill Donovan

== Player stats ==
= Indicates team leader

= Indicates league leader

=== Batting ===
==== Starters by position ====
Note: Pos = Position; G = Games played; AB = At bats; H = Hits; Avg. = Batting average; HR = Home runs; RBI = Runs batted in

Pos	Player	G	AB	H	Avg.	HR	RBI
C	Oscar Stanage	54	186	47	.253	1	16
1B	Harry Heilmann	79	286	79	.276	5	43
2B	Ralph Young	91	298	56	.188	0	21
SS	Donie Bush	128	500	117	.234	0	26
3B	Ossie Vitt	81	267	64	.240	0	17
OF	George Harper	69	227	55	.242	0	16
OF	Ty Cobb	111	421	161	.382	3	62
OF	Bobby Veach	127	499	139	.279	3	84

==== Other batters ====
Note: G = Games played; AB = At bats; H = Hits; Avg. = Batting average; HR = Home runs; RBI = Runs batted in

Player	G	AB	H	Avg.	HR	RBI
Bob Jones	74	287	79	.275	0	21
Frank Walker	55	167	33	.198	1	20
Tubby Spencer	66	155	34	.219	0	10
Archie Yelle	56	144	25	.174	0	8
George Cunningham	56	112	25	.223	0	3
Lee Dressen	31	107	19	.178	0	2
Art Griggs	28	99	36	.364	0	19
Jack Coffey	22	67	14	.209	0	2
Marty Kavanagh	13	44	12	.273	0	9
Babe Ellison	7	23	6	.261	0	3
Jim Curry	5	20	5	.250	0	3
Ben Dyer	13	18	5	.278	0	2
Davy Jones	1	2	0	.000	0	0
Joe Cobb	1	0	0	----	0	0
Hughie Jennings	1	0	0	----	0	0

=== Pitching ===
==== Starting pitchers ====
Note: G = Games pitched; IP = Innings pitched; W = Wins; L = Losses; ERA = Earned run average; SO = Strikeouts

Player	G	IP	W	L	ERA	SO
Hooks Dauss	33	249.2	12	16	2.99	73
Bernie Boland	29	204.0	14	10	2.65	63
Rudy Kallio	30	181.1	8	13	3.62	70
Bill James	19	122.0	6	11	3.76	42
Eric Erickson	12	94.1	4	5	2.48	48
Willie Mitchell	1	4.0	0	1	9.00	2

==== Other pitchers ====
Note: G = Games pitched; IP = Innings pitched; W = Wins; L = Losses; ERA = Earned run average; SO = Strikeouts

Player	G	IP	W	L	ERA	SO
George Cunningham	27	140.0	6	7	3.15	39
Bill Bailey	8	37.0	1	2	5.97	13
Harry Coveleski	3	14.0	0	1	3.86	3
Happy Finneran	5	13.2	0	2	9.88	2
Charley Hall	6	13.1	0	1	6.75	2
Bill Donovan	2	6.0	1	0	1.50	1

==== Relief pitchers ====
Note: G = Games pitched; W = Wins; L = Losses; SV = Saves; ERA = Earned run average; SO = Strikeouts

Player	G	W	L	SV	ERA	SO
Deacon Jones	21	3	2	0	3.09	15
Herb Hall	3	0	0	0	15.00	1
Ty Cobb	2	0	0	0	4.50	0
Ben Dyer	2	0	0	0	0.00	0
Bobby Veach	1	0	0	1	4.50	0
