= 1918 Chicago White Sox season =

1918 Chicago White Sox
- League: American League
- Ballpark: Comiskey Park
- City: Chicago, Illinois
- Record: 57–67 (.460)
- League place: 6th
- Owners: Charles Comiskey
- Managers: Pants Rowland

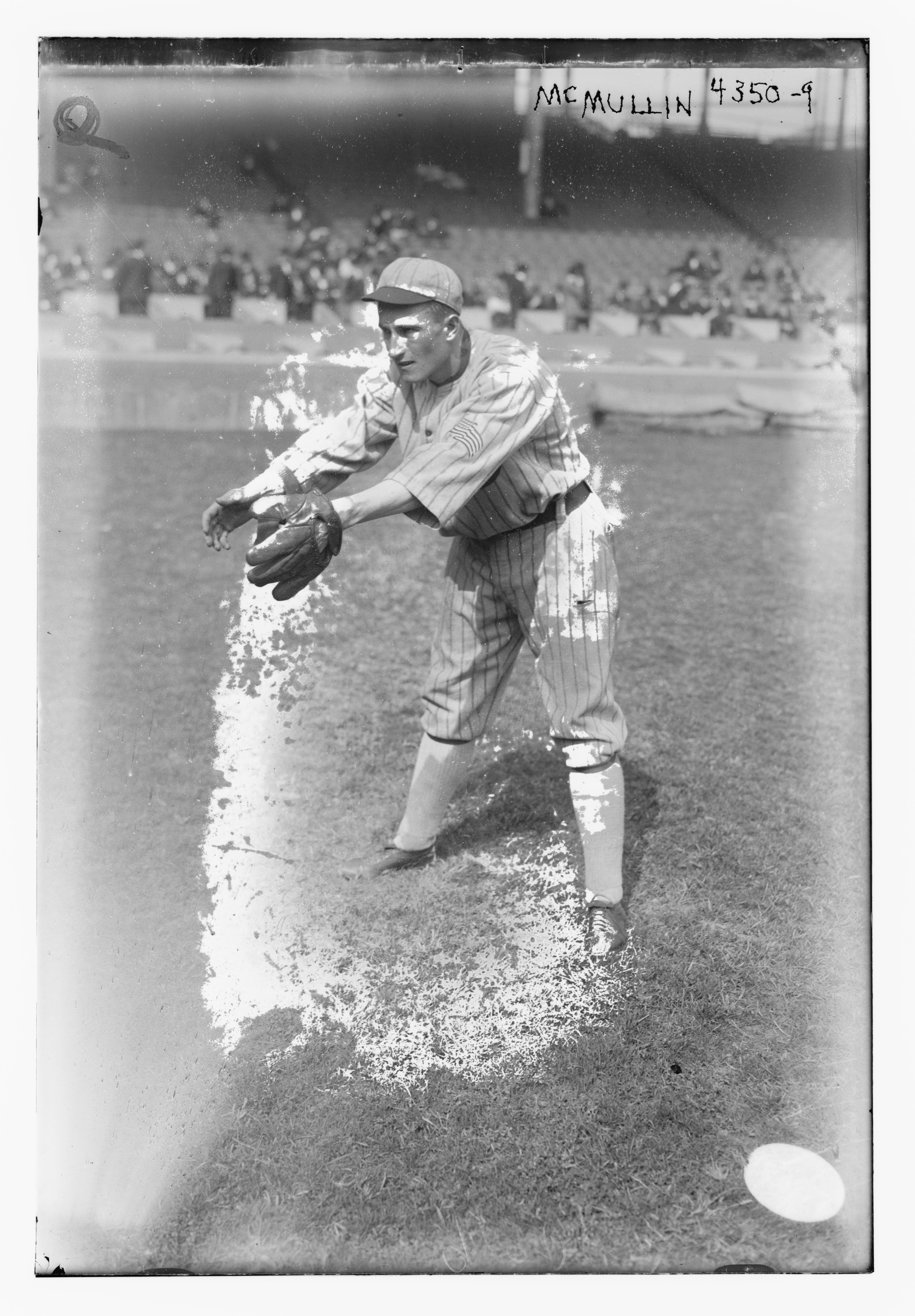
Fred McMullin (1918)

Depleted of most of their stars due to World War I, the Chicago White Sox had a relatively bad year in 1918, going 57–67 and finishing in the second place. They had won the American League pennant in 1917 and would win another in 1919.

== Regular season ==
Ace pitcher Eddie Cicotte led the AL in losses, with 19.

=== Season standings ===
American League
Team	W	L	Pct.	GB	Home	Road
Boston Red Sox	75	51	.595	—	49‍–‍21	26‍–‍30
Cleveland Indians	73	54	.575	2½	38‍–‍22	35‍–‍32
Washington Senators	72	56	.562	4	41‍–‍32	31‍–‍24
New York Yankees	60	63	.488	13½	37‍–‍29	23‍–‍34
St. Louis Browns	58	64	.475	15	23‍–‍30	35‍–‍34
Chicago White Sox	57	67	.460	17	30‍–‍26	27‍–‍41
Detroit Tigers	55	71	.437	20	28‍–‍29	27‍–‍42
Philadelphia Athletics	52	76	.406	24	35‍–‍32	17‍–‍44

=== Record vs. opponents ===
1918 American League record Sources:
Team	BOS	CWS	CLE	DET	NYY	PHA	SLB	WSH
Boston	—	12–7	10–10	13–5	6–11	13–6	14–5	7–7
Chicago	7–12	—	10–11	6–10	12–6	11–10	5–5	6–13
Cleveland	10–10	11–10	—	10–3	11–7–1	13–7–1	10–6	8–11
Detroit	5–13	10–6	3–10	—	9–10–1	9–11	10–10	9–11–1
New York	11–6	6–12	7–11–1	10–9–1	—	8–4	10–10–1	8–11
Philadelphia	6–13	10–11	7–13–1	11–9	4–8	—	8–10	6–12–1
St. Louis	5–14	5–5	6–10	10–10	10–10–1	10–8	—	12–7
Washington	7–7	13–6	11–8	11–9–1	11–8	12–6–1	7–12	—

=== Roster ===
1918 Chicago White Sox
Roster
Pitchers: Joe Benz; Eddie Cicotte; Ed Corey; Dave Danforth; Red Faber; Roy Mitchell; Jack Quinn; Reb Russell; Frank Shellenback; Lefty Williams; Mellie Wolfgang	Catchers: Al DeVormer; Otto Jacobs; Byrd Lynn; Ray Schalk; Infielders: Eddie Collins; Chick Gandil; Ted Jourdan; Fred McMullin; Johnny Mostil; Babe Pinelli; Swede Risberg; Buck Weaver	Outfielders: Shano Collins; Happy Felsch; Wilbur Good; Joe Jackson; Nemo Leibold; Eddie Murphy; Other batters: Pat Hardgrove; Kid Willson	Manager: Pants Rowland

== Player stats ==
=== Batting ===
==== Starters by position ====
Note: Pos = Position; G = Games played; AB = At bats; H = Hits; Avg. = Batting average; HR = Home runs; RBI = Runs batted in

Pos	Player	G	AB	H	Avg.	HR	RBI
C	Ray Schalk	108	333	73	.219	0	22
1B	Chick Gandil	114	439	119	.271	0	55
2B	Eddie Collins	97	330	91	.276	2	30
3B	Fred McMullin	70	235	65	.277	1	16
SS	Buck Weaver	112	420	126	.300	0	29
OF	Shano Collins	103	365	100	.274	1	56
OF	Eddie Murphy	91	286	85	.297	0	23
OF	Nemo Leibold	116	440	110	.250	0	31

==== Other batters ====
Note: G = Games played; AB = At bats; H = Hits; Avg. = Batting average; HR = Home runs; RBI = Runs batted in

Player	G	AB	H	Avg.	HR	RBI
Swede Risberg	82	273	70	.256	1	27
Happy Felsch	53	206	52	.252	1	20
Wilbur Good	35	148	37	.250	0	11
Babe Pinelli	24	78	18	.231	1	7
Otto Jacobs	29	73	15	.205	0	3
Joe Jackson	17	65	23	.354	1	20
Johnny Mostil	10	33	9	.273	0	4
Al DeVormer	8	19	5	.263	0	0
Ted Jourdan	7	10	1	.100	0	1
Pat Hardgrove	2	2	0	.000	0	0
Kid Willson	4	1	0	.000	0	0

=== Pitching ===
==== Starting pitchers ====
Note: G = Games pitched; IP = Innings pitched; W = Wins; L = Losses; ERA = Earned run average; SO = Strikeouts

Player	G	IP	W	L	ERA	SO
Eddie Cicotte	38	266.0	12	19	2.77	104
Frank Shellenback	28	182.2	9	12	2.66	47
Reb Russell	19	124.2	7	5	2.60	38
Lefty Williams	15	105.2	6	4	2.73	30
Red Faber	11	80.2	4	1	1.23	26
Jack Quinn	6	51.0	5	1	2.29	22
Roy Mitchell	2	12.0	0	1	7.50	3

==== Other pitchers ====
Note: G = Games pitched; IP = Innings pitched; W = Wins; L = Losses; ERA = Earned run average; SO = Strikeouts

Player	G	IP	W	L	ERA	SO
Joe Benz	29	154.0	8	8	2.63	30
Dave Danforth	39	139.0	6	15	3.43	48

==== Relief pitchers ====
Note: G = Games pitched; W = Wins; L = Losses; SV = Saves; ERA = Earned run average; SO = Strikeouts

Player	G	W	L	SV	ERA	SO
Mellie Wolfgang	4	0	1	0	5.40	1
Ed Corey	1	0	0	0	4.50	0

== Awards and honors ==
=== League top ten finishers ===
Eddie Cicotte

- #6 in AL in strikeouts (104)

Eddie Murphy

- #9 in AL in batting average (.297)

Buck Weaver

- #7 in AL in batting average (.300)
