= 1918 New York Yankees season =

Season for the Major League Baseball team the New York Yankees

1918 New York Yankees
- League: American League
- Ballpark: Polo Grounds
- City: New York City, New York
- Record: 60–63 (.488)
- League place: 4th
- Owners: Jacob Ruppert and Tillinghast L'Hommedieu Huston
- Managers: Miller Huggins

The 1918 New York Yankees season was the 16th season for the franchise. The team finished with a record of 60–63, finishing 13.5 games behind the American League champion Boston Red Sox. New York was managed by Miller Huggins. Their home games were played at the Polo Grounds.

== Hiring of Miller Huggins ==
The Yankees and the owners, Jacob Ruppert and Tillinghast L'Hommedieu Huston, announced on October 25, 1917 that they had signed Miller Huggins to a two year contract that paid around $12,000 (1917 USD) per season, replacing Bill Donovan. Huggins' contract with the St. Louis Cardinals expired after the 1917 season and American League President Ban Johnson signed him to join a team in the league. As part of Huggins' new deal, scout Tom Conrey would join the Yankees from the Cardinals, joining Bob Gilks and Joe Kelley. Branch Rickey, the President of the Cardinals, offered Huggins a salary of $10,000 per year and 10% of all profits over $25,000 if he stayed with the club for the 1918 season.

== Regular season ==
=== Season standings ===
American League
Team	W	L	Pct.	GB	Home	Road
Boston Red Sox	75	51	.595	—	49‍–‍21	26‍–‍30
Cleveland Indians	73	54	.575	2½	38‍–‍22	35‍–‍32
Washington Senators	72	56	.562	4	41‍–‍32	31‍–‍24
New York Yankees	60	63	.488	13½	37‍–‍29	23‍–‍34
St. Louis Browns	58	64	.475	15	23‍–‍30	35‍–‍34
Chicago White Sox	57	67	.460	17	30‍–‍26	27‍–‍41
Detroit Tigers	55	71	.437	20	28‍–‍29	27‍–‍42
Philadelphia Athletics	52	76	.406	24	35‍–‍32	17‍–‍44

=== Record vs. opponents ===
1918 American League record Sources:
Team	BOS	CWS	CLE	DET	NYY	PHA	SLB	WSH
Boston	—	12–7	10–10	13–5	6–11	13–6	14–5	7–7
Chicago	7–12	—	10–11	6–10	12–6	11–10	5–5	6–13
Cleveland	10–10	11–10	—	10–3	11–7–1	13–7–1	10–6	8–11
Detroit	5–13	10–6	3–10	—	9–10–1	9–11	10–10	9–11–1
New York	11–6	6–12	7–11–1	10–9–1	—	8–4	10–10–1	8–11
Philadelphia	6–13	10–11	7–13–1	11–9	4–8	—	8–10	6–12–1
St. Louis	5–14	5–5	6–10	10–10	10–10–1	10–8	—	12–7
Washington	7–7	13–6	11–8	11–9–1	11–8	12–6–1	7–12	—

=== Roster ===
1918 New York Yankees roster
Roster
Pitchers: Walter Bernhardt; Ray Caldwell; Alex Ferguson; Happy Finneran; Ray Keating; Slim Love; Bob McGraw; George Mogridge; Ed Monroe; Hank Robinson; Allen Russell; Roy Sanders; Bob Shawkey; Hank Thormahlen; Dazzy Vance	Catchers: Truck Hannah; Paddy O'Connor; Muddy Ruel; Roxy Walters; Infielders: Frank Baker; Zinn Beck; Chick Fewster; Jack Fournier; Roger Peckinpaugh; Wally Pipp; Del Pratt; Aaron Ward	Outfielders: Ping Bodie; Frank Gilhooley; Hugh High; John Hummel; Ham Hyatt; Bill Lamar; Armando Marsans; Elmer Miller; Sammy Vick	Manager: Miller Huggins; Coaches: Paddy O'Connor

== Player stats ==
=== Batting ===
==== Starters by position ====
Note: Pos = Position; G = Games played; AB = At bats; H = Hits; Avg. = Batting average; HR = Home runs; RBI = Runs batted in

Pos	Player	G	AB	H	Avg.	HR	RBI
C	Truck Hannah	90	250	55	.220	2	21
1B	Wally Pipp	91	349	106	.304	2	44
2B	Del Pratt	126	477	131	.275	2	55
SS	Roger Peckinpaugh	122	446	103	.231	0	43
3B	Frank Baker	126	504	154	.306	6	62
OF	Ping Bodie	91	324	83	.256	3	46
OF	Frank Gilhooley	112	427	118	.276	1	23
OF	Elmer Miller	67	202	49	.243	1	22

==== Other batters ====
Note: G = Games played; AB = At bats; H = Hits; Avg. = Batting average; HR = Home runs; RBI = Runs batted in

Player	G	AB	H	Avg.	HR	RBI
Roxy Walters	64	191	38	.199	0	12
Ham Hyatt	53	131	30	.229	2	10
Armando Marsans	37	123	29	.236	0	9
Bill Lamar	28	110	25	.227	0	2
Jack Fournier	27	100	35	.350	0	12
John Hummel	22	61	18	.295	0	4
Aaron Ward	20	32	4	.125	0	1
Hugh High	7	10	0	.000	0	0
Zinn Beck	11	8	0	.000	0	1
Muddy Ruel	3	6	2	.333	0	0
Sammy Vick	2	3	2	.667	0	1
Paddy O'Connor	1	3	1	.333	0	0
Chick Fewster	5	2	1	.500	0	0

=== Pitching ===
==== Starting pitchers ====
Note: G = Games pitched; IP = Innings pitched; W = Wins; L = Losses; ERA = Earned run average; SO = Strikeouts

Player	G	IP	W	L	ERA	SO
Slim Love	38	228.2	13	12	3.07	95
Ray Caldwell	24	176.2	9	8	3.06	59
Allen Russell	27	141.0	7	11	3.26	54
Hank Thormahlen	16	112.2	7	3	2.48	22
Bob McGraw	1	0.0	0	1	inf	0

==== Other pitchers ====
Note: G = Games pitched; IP = Innings pitched; W = Wins; L = Losses; ERA = Earned run average; SO = Strikeouts

Player	G	IP	W	L	ERA	SO
George Mogridge	45	239.1	16	13	2.18	62
Happy Finneran	23	114.1	3	6	3.78	34
Ray Keating	15	48.1	2	2	3.91	16
Hank Robinson	11	48.0	2	4	3.00	14
Roy Sanders	6	25.2	0	2	4.21	8
Bob Shawkey	3	16.0	1	1	1.13	3

==== Relief pitchers ====
Note: G = Games pitched; W = Wins; L = Losses; SV = Saves; ERA = Earned run average; SO = Strikeouts

Player	G	W	L	SV	ERA	SO
Dazzy Vance	2	0	0	0	15.43	0
Ed Monroe	1	0	0	0	4.50	1
Alex Ferguson	1	0	0	0	0.00	1
Walter Bernhardt	1	0	0	0	0.00	1
