= 1918 Boston Red Sox season =

Major League Baseball season

1918 Boston Red Sox
- World Series champions American League champions
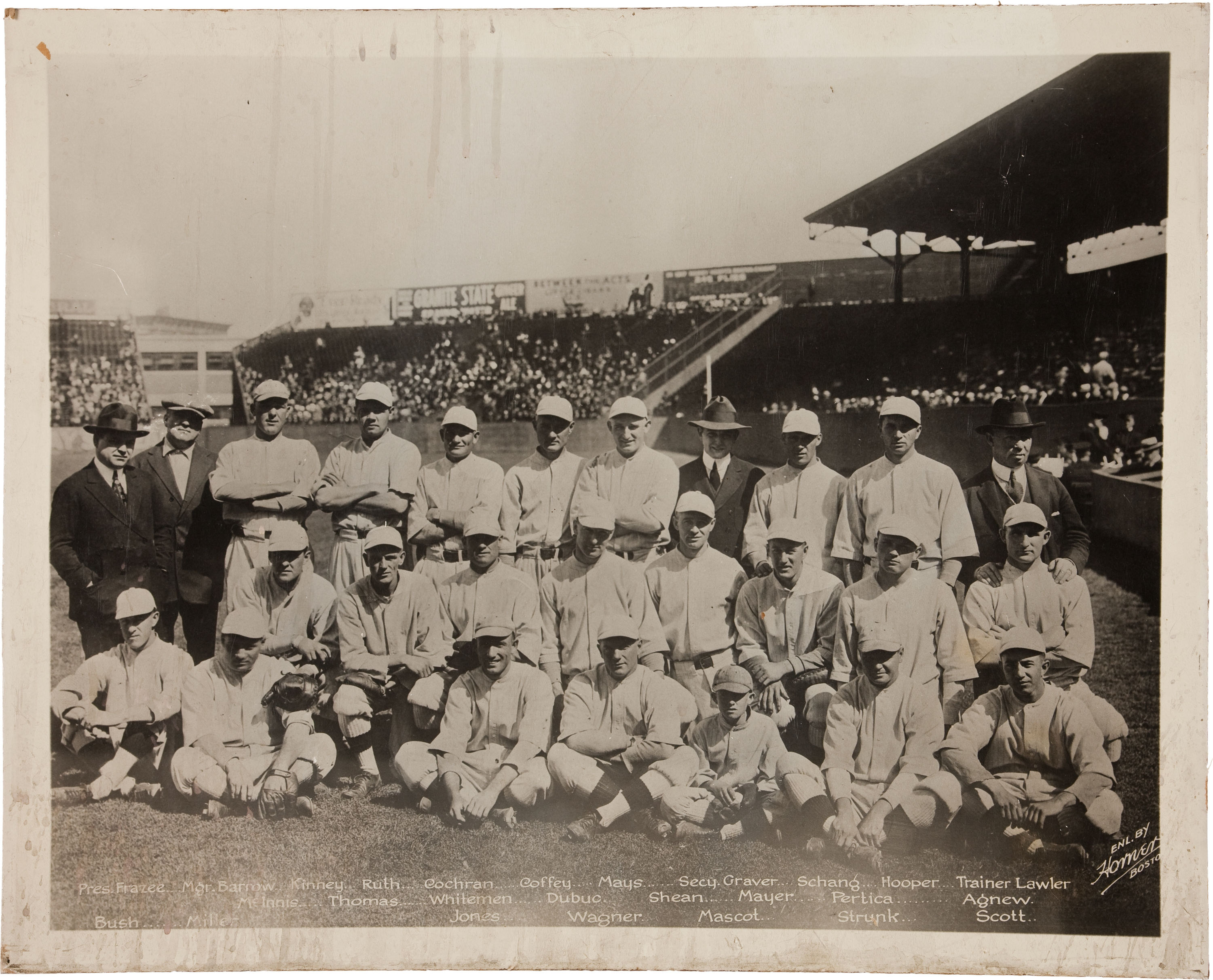
- 1918 Boston Red Sox team photo, with Babe Ruth fourth from left in the back row
- League: American League
- Ballpark: Fenway Park
- City: Boston, Massachusetts
- Record: 75–51 (.595)
- League place: 1st
- Owners: Harry Frazee
- Managers: Ed Barrow
- Stats: ESPN.com; Baseball Reference

The 1918 Boston Red Sox season was the 18th season in the franchise's Major League Baseball history. The Red Sox finished first in the American League (AL) with a record of 75 wins and 51 losses, in a season cut short due to World War I. The team then faced the National League (NL) champion Chicago Cubs in the 1918 World Series, which the Red Sox won in six games to capture the franchise's fifth World Series. This would be the last World Series championship for the Red Sox until 2004.

With World War I ongoing, a "work or fight" mandate was issued by the government, requiring men with non-essential jobs to enlist or take war-related jobs by July 1, else risk being drafted. Secretary of War Newton D. Baker granted an extension to MLB players through Labor Day, September 2. In early August, MLB clubs decided that the regular season would end at that time. As a result, AL teams played between 123 and 130 regular-season games (including ties), reduced from their original 154-game schedules. Later in August, Baker granted a further extension to allow for the World Series to be contested; it began on September 5 and ended on September 11. World War I would end two months later, with the Armistice of 11 November 1918.

Due to the entry of the United States into World War I, several Red Sox players enlisted with the military over the winter. Notable players who enlisted included Pitchers Ernie Shore and Herb Pennock, Outfielder Duffy Lewis, as well as Manager Jack Barry.

The Red Sox' pitching staff, led by Carl Mays and Bullet Joe Bush, allowed the fewest runs in the league. Babe Ruth was the fourth starter and also spent significant time in the outfield, as he was the best hitter on the team, leading the AL in home runs and slugging percentage.

After this season, the Red Sox would fall into mediocrity, mainly because they traded away most of their star players to other teams, most notably, sending Ruth to the Yankees in 1920. The team would not have another winning record until 1935, 18 years later.

== Regular season ==
=== Season standings ===
American League
| Team | W | L | Pct. | GB | Home | Road |
|---|---|---|---|---|---|---|
| Boston Red Sox | 75 | 51 | .595 | — | 49‍–‍21 | 26‍–‍30 |
| Cleveland Indians | 73 | 54 | .575 | 2½ | 38‍–‍22 | 35‍–‍32 |
| Washington Senators | 72 | 56 | .562 | 4 | 41‍–‍32 | 31‍–‍24 |
| New York Yankees | 60 | 63 | .488 | 13½ | 37‍–‍29 | 23‍–‍34 |
| St. Louis Browns | 58 | 64 | .475 | 15 | 23‍–‍30 | 35‍–‍34 |
| Chicago White Sox | 57 | 67 | .460 | 17 | 30‍–‍26 | 27‍–‍41 |
| Detroit Tigers | 55 | 71 | .437 | 20 | 28‍–‍29 | 27‍–‍42 |
| Philadelphia Athletics | 52 | 76 | .406 | 24 | 35‍–‍32 | 17‍–‍44 |

=== Record vs. opponents ===
1918 American League record Sources:
| Team | BOS | CWS | CLE | DET | NYY | PHA | SLB | WSH |
|---|---|---|---|---|---|---|---|---|
| Boston | — | 12–7 | 10–10 | 13–5 | 6–11 | 13–6 | 14–5 | 7–7 |
| Chicago | 7–12 | — | 10–11 | 6–10 | 12–6 | 11–10 | 5–5 | 6–13 |
| Cleveland | 10–10 | 11–10 | — | 10–3 | 11–7–1 | 13–7–1 | 10–6 | 8–11 |
| Detroit | 5–13 | 10–6 | 3–10 | — | 9–10–1 | 9–11 | 10–10 | 9–11–1 |
| New York | 11–6 | 6–12 | 7–11–1 | 10–9–1 | — | 8–4 | 10–10–1 | 8–11 |
| Philadelphia | 6–13 | 10–11 | 7–13–1 | 11–9 | 4–8 | — | 8–10 | 6–12–1 |
| St. Louis | 5–14 | 5–5 | 6–10 | 10–10 | 10–10–1 | 10–8 | — | 12–7 |
| Washington | 7–7 | 13–6 | 11–8 | 11–9–1 | 11–8 | 12–6–1 | 7–12 | — |

=== Opening Day lineup ===
| Harry Hooper | RF |
| Dave Shean | 2B |
| Amos Strunk | CF |
| Dick Hoblitzel | 1B |
| Stuffy McInnis | 3B |
| George Whiteman | LF |
| Everett Scott | SS |
| Sam Agnew | C |
| Babe Ruth | P |

=== Roster ===
1918 Boston Red Sox
Roster
| Pitchers: Lore Bader; Joe Bush; Jean Dubuc; Sad Sam Jones; Walt Kinney; Dutch Leonard; Carl Mays; Dick McCabe; Vince Molyneaux; Bill Pertica; Weldon Wyckoff | Catchers: Sam Agnew; Wally Mayer; Wally Schang; Infielders: Walter Barbare; George Cochran; Jack Coffey; Eusebio González; Dick Hoblitzel; Stuffy McInnis; Everett Scott; Dave Shean; Jack Stansbury; Fred Thomas; Frank Truesdale; Heinie Wagner | Outfielders: Harry Hooper; Hack Miller; Babe Ruth; Amos Strunk; George Whiteman; Other batters: Red Bluhm | Manager: Ed Barrow |

== Player stats ==
| = Indicates team leader |

| = Indicates league leader |

=== Batting ===
==== Starters by position ====
Note: Pos = Position; G = Games played; AB = At bats; H = Hits; Avg. = Batting average; HR = Home runs; RBI = Runs batted in

| Pos | Player | G | AB | H | Avg. | HR | RBI |
|---|---|---|---|---|---|---|---|
| C | Sam Agnew | 72 | 199 | 33 | .166 | 0 | 6 |
| 1B | Stuffy McInnis | 117 | 423 | 115 | .272 | 0 | 56 |
| 2B | Dave Shean | 115 | 425 | 112 | .264 | 0 | 34 |
| SS | Everett Scott | 126 | 443 | 98 | .221 | 0 | 43 |
| 3B | Fred Thomas | 44 | 144 | 37 | .257 | 1 | 11 |
| OF | George Whiteman | 71 | 214 | 57 | .266 | 1 | 28 |
| OF | Amos Strunk | 114 | 413 | 106 | .257 | 0 | 35 |
| OF | Harry Hooper | 126 | 474 | 137 | .289 | 1 | 44 |

==== Other batters ====
Note: G = Games played; AB = At bats; H = Hits; Avg. = Batting average; HR = Home runs; RBI = Runs batted in

| Player | G | AB | H | Avg. | HR | RBI |
|---|---|---|---|---|---|---|
| Babe Ruth | 90 | 317 | 95 | .300 | 11* | 66 |
| Wally Schang | 88 | 225 | 55 | .244 | 0 | 20 |
| Dick Hoblitzel | 25 | 69 | 11 | .159 | 0 | 4 |
| George Cochran | 24 | 60 | 7 | .117 | 0 | 3 |
| Wally Mayer | 26 | 49 | 11 | .224 | 0 | 5 |
| Jack Stansbury | 20 | 47 | 6 | .128 | 0 | 2 |
| Jack Coffey | 15 | 44 | 7 | .159 | 1 | 2 |
| Frank Truesdale | 15 | 36 | 10 | .278 | 0 | 2 |
| Walter Barbare | 13 | 29 | 5 | .172 | 0 | 2 |
| Hack Miller | 12 | 29 | 8 | .276 | 0 | 4 |
| Heinie Wagner | 3 | 8 | 1 | .125 | 0 | 0 |
| Eusebio González | 3 | 5 | 2 | .400 | 0 | 0 |
| Red Bluhm | 1 | 1 | 0 | .000 | 0 | 0 |

- Tied with Tillie Walker (Philadelphia Athletics)

=== Pitching ===
==== Starting pitchers ====
Note: G = Games pitched; IP = Innings pitched; W = Wins; L = Losses; ERA = Earned run average; SO = Strikeouts

| Player | G | IP | W | L | ERA | SO |
|---|---|---|---|---|---|---|
| Carl Mays | 35 | 293.1 | 21 | 13 | 2.21 | 114 |
| Joe Bush | 36 | 272.2 | 15 | 15 | 2.11 | 125 |
| Sam Jones | 24 | 184.0 | 16 | 5 | 2.25 | 44 |
| Babe Ruth | 20 | 166.1 | 13 | 7 | 2.22 | 40 |
| Dutch Leonard | 16 | 125.2 | 8 | 6 | 2.72 | 47 |
| Lore Bader | 5 | 27.0 | 1 | 3 | 3.33 | 10 |

==== Other pitchers ====
Note: G = Games pitched; IP = Innings pitched; W = Wins; L = Losses; ERA = Earned run average; SO = Strikeouts

| Player | G | IP | W | L | ERA | SO |
|---|---|---|---|---|---|---|
| Jean Dubuc | 2 | 10.2 | 0 | 1 | 4.22 | 1 |
| Dick McCabe | 3 | 9.2 | 0 | 1 | 2.79 | 3 |

==== Relief pitchers ====
Note: G = Games pitched; W = Wins; L = Losses; SV = Saves; ERA = Earned run average; SO = Strikeouts

| Player | G | W | L | SV | ERA | SO |
|---|---|---|---|---|---|---|
| Vince Molyneaux | 6 | 1 | 0 | 0 | 3.38 | 1 |
| Walt Kinney | 5 | 0 | 0 | 0 | 1.80 | 4 |
| Bill Pertica | 1 | 0 | 0 | 0 | 3.00 | 1 |
| Weldon Wyckoff | 1 | 0 | 0 | 0 | 0.00 | 2 |

== Awards and honors ==
=== League top ten finishers ===
Bullet Joe Bush

- #3 strikeouts (125)
- #5 earned run average (2.11)

Harry Hooper

- #3 runs scored (81)

Carl Mays

- #3 wins (21)
- #5 strikeouts (114)

Babe Ruth

- #1 home runs (11)
- #1 slugging percentage (.555)
- #2 on-base percentage (.411)
- #3 runs batted in (66)

== 1918 World Series ==
AL Boston Red Sox (4) vs. NL Chicago Cubs (2)

| Game | Score | Date | Location | Attendance |
|---|---|---|---|---|
| 1 | Red Sox – 1, Cubs – 0 | September 5 | Comiskey Park | 19,274 |
| 2 | Red Sox – 1, Cubs – 3 | September 6 | Comiskey Park | 20,040 |
| 3 | Red Sox – 2, Cubs – 1 | September 7 | Comiskey Park | 27,054 |
| 4 | Cubs – 2, Red Sox – 3 | September 9 | Fenway Park | 22,183 |
| 5 | Cubs – 3, Red Sox – 0 | September 10 | Fenway Park | 24,694 |
| 6 | Cubs – 1, Red Sox – 2 | September 11 | Fenway Park | 15,238 |
