= Roy Sanders =

Roy Sanders may refer to:

- Roy Sanders (American League pitcher) (1894–1963), American baseball pitcher
- Roy Sanders (National League pitcher) (1892–1950), American baseball pitcher
