= 1918 Cleveland Indians season =

1918 Cleveland Indians
- League: American League
- Ballpark: Dunn Field
- City: Cleveland, Ohio
- Record: 73–54 (.575)
- League place: 2nd
- Owners: Jim Dunn
- Managers: Lee Fohl

The 1918 Cleveland Indians season was a season in American baseball. The team finished second in the American League with a record of 73–54, 2½ games behind the Boston Red Sox.

== Regular season ==
=== Season standings ===
American League
Team	W	L	Pct.	GB	Home	Road
Boston Red Sox	75	51	.595	—	49‍–‍21	26‍–‍30
Cleveland Indians	73	54	.575	2½	38‍–‍22	35‍–‍32
Washington Senators	72	56	.562	4	41‍–‍32	31‍–‍24
New York Yankees	60	63	.488	13½	37‍–‍29	23‍–‍34
St. Louis Browns	58	64	.475	15	23‍–‍30	35‍–‍34
Chicago White Sox	57	67	.460	17	30‍–‍26	27‍–‍41
Detroit Tigers	55	71	.437	20	28‍–‍29	27‍–‍42
Philadelphia Athletics	52	76	.406	24	35‍–‍32	17‍–‍44

=== Record vs. opponents ===
1918 American League record Sources:
Team	BOS	CWS	CLE	DET	NYY	PHA	SLB	WSH
Boston	—	12–7	10–10	13–5	6–11	13–6	14–5	7–7
Chicago	7–12	—	10–11	6–10	12–6	11–10	5–5	6–13
Cleveland	10–10	11–10	—	10–3	11–7–1	13–7–1	10–6	8–11
Detroit	5–13	10–6	3–10	—	9–10–1	9–11	10–10	9–11–1
New York	11–6	6–12	7–11–1	10–9–1	—	8–4	10–10–1	8–11
Philadelphia	6–13	10–11	7–13–1	11–9	4–8	—	8–10	6–12–1
St. Louis	5–14	5–5	6–10	10–10	10–10–1	10–8	—	12–7
Washington	7–7	13–6	11–8	11–9–1	11–8	12–6–1	7–12	—

=== Roster ===
1918 Cleveland Indians
Roster
Pitchers: Jim Bagby; Ad Brennan; Fritz Coumbe; Stan Coveleski; Johnny Enzmann; Bob Groom; Otis Lambeth; George McQuillan; Guy Morton; Roy Wilkinson	Catchers: Josh Billings; Steve O'Neill; John Peters; Pinch Thomas; Infielders: Ray Chapman; Joe Evans; Gus Getz; Al Halt; Doc Johnston; Marty Kavanagh; Ed Miller; Germany Schaefer; Terry Turner; Bill Wambsganss; Rip Williams	Outfielders: Bob Bescher; Jack Farmer; Jack Graney; Eddie Onslow; Braggo Roth; Tris Speaker; Joe Wood	Manager: Lee Fohl

== Player stats ==
=== Batting ===
==== Starters by position ====
Note: Pos = Position; G = Games played; AB = At bats; H = Hits; Avg. = Batting average; HR = Home runs; RBI = Runs batted in

Pos	Player	G	AB	H	Avg.	HR	RBI
C	Steve O'Neill	114	359	87	.242	1	35
1B	Doc Johnston	74	273	62	.227	0	25
2B	Bill Wambsganss	87	315	93	.295	0	40
SS	Ray Chapman	128	446	119	.267	1	32
3B	Joe Evans	79	243	64	.263	1	22
OF	Braggo Roth	106	375	106	.283	1	59
OF	Tris Speaker	127	471	150	.318	0	61
OF	Smoky Joe Wood	119	422	125	.296	5	66

==== Other batters ====
Note: G = Games played; AB = At bats; H = Hits; Avg. = Batting average; HR = Home runs; RBI = Runs batted in

Player	G	AB	H	Avg.	HR	RBI
Terry Turner	74	233	58	.249	0	23
Jack Graney	70	177	42	.237	0	9
Ed Miller	32	96	22	.229	0	3
Pinch Thomas	32	73	18	.247	0	5
Rip Williams	28	71	17	.239	0	7
Al Halt	26	69	12	.174	0	1
Bob Bescher	25	60	20	.333	0	6
Marty Kavanagh	13	38	8	.211	0	6
Gus Getz	6	15	2	.133	0	0
Jack Farmer	7	9	2	.222	0	1
Eddie Onslow	2	6	1	.167	0	0
Germany Schaefer	1	5	0	.000	0	0
John Peters	1	1	0	.000	0	0

=== Pitching ===
==== Starting pitchers ====
Note: G = Games pitched; IP = Innings pitched; W = Wins; L = Losses; ERA = Earned run average; SO = Strikeouts

Player	G	IP	W	L	ERA	SO
Stan Coveleski	38	311.0	22	13	1.82	87
Jim Bagby	45	271.1	17	16	2.69	57
Guy Morton	30	214.2	14	8	2.64	123

==== Other pitchers ====
Note: G = Games pitched; IP = Innings pitched; W = Wins; L = Losses; ERA = Earned run average; SO = Strikeouts

Player	G	IP	W	L	ERA	SO
Fritz Coumbe	30	150.0	13	7	3.06	41
Johnny Enzmann	30	136.2	5	7	2.37	38
Bob Groom	14	43.1	2	2	7.06	8
George McQuillan	5	23.0	0	1	2.35	7

==== Relief pitchers ====
Note: G = Games pitched; W = Wins; L = Losses; SV = Saves; ERA = Earned run average; SO = Strikeouts

Player	G	W	L	SV	ERA	SO
Otis Lambeth	2	0	0	0	6.43	3
Ad Brennan	1	0	0	0	3.00	0
Roy Wilkinson	1	0	0	0	0.00	0
