= 1918 St. Louis Browns season =

Major League Baseball season

1918 St. Louis Browns
- League: American League
- Ballpark: Sportsman's Park
- City: St. Louis, Missouri
- Record: 58–64 (.475)
- League place: 5th
- Owners: Phil Ball
- Managers: Fielder Jones, Jimmy Austin, and Jimmy Burke

The 1918 St. Louis Browns season involved the Browns finishing 5th in the American League with a record of 58 wins and 64 losses.

== Regular season ==
=== Season standings ===
American League
Team	W	L	Pct.	GB	Home	Road
Boston Red Sox	75	51	.595	—	49‍–‍21	26‍–‍30
Cleveland Indians	73	54	.575	2½	38‍–‍22	35‍–‍32
Washington Senators	72	56	.562	4	41‍–‍32	31‍–‍24
New York Yankees	60	63	.488	13½	37‍–‍29	23‍–‍34
St. Louis Browns	58	64	.475	15	23‍–‍30	35‍–‍34
Chicago White Sox	57	67	.460	17	30‍–‍26	27‍–‍41
Detroit Tigers	55	71	.437	20	28‍–‍29	27‍–‍42
Philadelphia Athletics	52	76	.406	24	35‍–‍32	17‍–‍44

=== Record vs. opponents ===
1918 American League record Sources:
Team	BOS	CWS	CLE	DET	NYY	PHA	SLB	WSH
Boston	—	12–7	10–10	13–5	6–11	13–6	14–5	7–7
Chicago	7–12	—	10–11	6–10	12–6	11–10	5–5	6–13
Cleveland	10–10	11–10	—	10–3	11–7–1	13–7–1	10–6	8–11
Detroit	5–13	10–6	3–10	—	9–10–1	9–11	10–10	9–11–1
New York	11–6	6–12	7–11–1	10–9–1	—	8–4	10–10–1	8–11
Philadelphia	6–13	10–11	7–13–1	11–9	4–8	—	8–10	6–12–1
St. Louis	5–14	5–5	6–10	10–10	10–10–1	10–8	—	12–7
Washington	7–7	13–6	11–8	11–9–1	11–8	12–6–1	7–12	—

=== Roster ===
1918 St. Louis Browns
Roster
Pitchers: Bugs Bennett; Dave Davenport; Bert Gallia; Byron Houck; Lefty Leifield; Grover Lowdermilk; Tim McCabe; Tom Rogers; Urban Shocker; Allen Sothoron; Rasty Wright	Catchers: George Hale; Les Nunamaker; Hank Severeid; Infielders: Jimmy Austin; Joe Gedeon; Wally Gerber; Pete Johns; Ernie Johnson; Fritz Maisel; George Sisler	Outfielders: Ray Demmitt; Tim Hendryx; Earl Smith; Jack Tobin; Other batters: Ken Williams	Manager: Jimmy Austin; Jimmy Burke; Fielder Jones

== Player stats ==
=== Batting ===
==== Starters by position ====
Note: Pos = Position; G = Games played; AB = At bats; H = Hits; Avg. = Batting average; HR = Home runs; RBI = Runs batted in

Pos	Player	G	AB	H	Avg.	HR	RBI
C	Les Nunamaker	85	274	71	.259	0	22
1B	George Sisler	114	452	154	.341	2	41
2B	Joe Gedeon	123	441	94	.213	1	41
SS	Jimmy Austin	110	367	97	.264	0	20
3B	Fritz Maisel	90	284	66	.232	0	16
OF	Ray Demmitt	116	405	114	.281	1	61
OF	Earl Smith	89	286	77	.269	0	32
OF	Jack Tobin	122	480	133	.277	0	36

==== Other batters ====
Note: G = Games played; AB = At bats; H = Hits; Avg. = Batting average; HR = Home runs; RBI = Runs batted in

Player	G	AB	H	Avg.	HR	RBI
Tim Hendryx	88	219	61	.279	0	33
Wally Gerber	56	171	41	.240	0	10
Hank Severeid	51	133	34	.256	0	11
Pete Johns	46	89	16	.180	0	11
Ernie Johnson	29	34	9	.265	0	4
George Hale	12	30	4	.133	0	1
Ken Williams	2	1	0	.000	0	1

=== Pitching ===
==== Starting pitchers ====
Note: G = Games pitched; IP = Innings pitched; W = Wins; L = Losses; ERA = Earned run average; SO = Strikeouts

Player	G	IP	W	L	ERA	SO
Al Sothoron	29	209.0	12	12	1.94	71
Dave Davenport	31	180.0	10	11	3.25	60
Bert Gallia	19	124.0	8	6	3.48	48
Rasty Wright	18	111.1	8	2	2.51	25
Grover Lowdermilk	13	80.0	2	6	3.15	25

==== Other pitchers ====
Note: G = Games pitched; IP = Innings pitched; W = Wins; L = Losses; ERA = Earned run average; SO = Strikeouts

Player	G	IP	W	L	ERA	SO
Tom Rogers	29	154.0	8	10	3.27	29
Urban Shocker	14	94.2	6	5	1.81	33
Lefty Leifield	15	67.0	2	6	2.55	22
Bugs Bennett	4	10.1	0	2	3.48	0
George Sisler	2	8.0	0	0	4.50	4

==== Relief pitchers ====
Note: G = Games pitched; W = Wins; L = Losses; SV = Saves; ERA = Earned run average; SO = Strikeouts

Player	G	W	L	SV	ERA	SO
Byron Houck	27	2	4	2	2.39	29
Tim McCabe	1	0	0	0	13.50	0
