= George Cochran (baseball) =

American baseball player (1889–1960)

- Third baseman
- Born: February 12, 1889; Rusk, Texas, U.S.
- Died: May 21, 1960 (aged 71); Harbor City, California, U.S.
- Batted: Right Threw: Right

MLB debut
- July 29, 1918, for the Boston Red Sox

Last MLB appearance
- September 2, 1918, for the Boston Red Sox

MLB statistics
- Batting average: .117
- Home runs: 0
- Runs batted in: 3
- Stats at Baseball Reference

Teams
- Boston Red Sox (1918)

George Leslie Cochran (February 12, 1889 – May 21, 1960) was an American third baseman and shortstop in Major League Baseball who played briefly for the Boston Red Sox in the 1918 season. Cochran was a switch-hitter and threw right-handed. He was born in Rusk, Texas.

Cochran reached the majors in 1918 with the Boston Red Sox after batting leadoff with the Kansas City Blues, the 1918 American Association champion team. Cochran debuted with Boston on July 29, 1918 and played all but one of his 24 major league games at third base. He played his final game on September 2, 1918.

In his one-season career, Cochran posted a .117 batting average (7-for-60) with seven runs, three RBI, and three stolen bases without home runs.

Cochran died in Harbor City, California at the age of 71.

== Fact ==
- Although baseball encyclopedias only list Cochran as a right-handed thrower, the San Francisco Chronicle of September 4, 1918 also lists his height (5 ft 9 in (1.75 m)), weight (160 lbs.) and batting side (both).
