= Bob Berman (baseball) =

American baseball player (1899-1988)

- Catcher
- Born: January 24, 1899; New York City
- Died: August 2, 1988 (aged 89); Bridgeport, Connecticut
- Batted: Right Threw: Right

MLB debut
- June 4, 1918, for the Washington Senators

Last MLB appearance
- June 12, 1918, for the Washington Senators

MLB statistics
- Games played: 2
- At bats: 0
- Hits: 0
- Stats at Baseball Reference

Teams
- Washington Senators (1918)

Robert Leon Berman (January 24, 1899 – August 2, 1988) was a Major League Baseball catcher who played in two games for the Washington Senators in 1918. He did not get an at bat in his short major league career, but did make two putouts as a catcher. He was Jewish. He attended Fordham University.
