= Otto Jacobs =

American baseball player (1889–1955)

- Catcher
- Born: April 19, 1889; Chicago, Illinois, U.S.
- Died: November 19, 1955 (aged 66); Chicago, Illinois, U.S.
- Batted: Right Threw: Right

MLB debut
- June 13, 1918, for the Chicago White Sox

Last MLB appearance
- August 24, 1918, for the Chicago White Sox

MLB statistics
- Batting average: .205
- Home runs: 0
- Runs batted in: 3
- Stats at Baseball Reference

Teams
- Chicago White Sox (1918)

Otto Albert Jacobs (April 19, 1889 – November 19, 1955) was an American catcher in Major League Baseball. He played for the Chicago White Sox in 1918.

== Biography ==
Jacobs was born in Chicago, Illinois, and started his professional baseball career in 1910. He spent the next few years in the Illinois–Indiana–Iowa League. In 1915, he joined the Rockford Wakes and had his best season, batting .302 and leading the league in home runs (7) and slugging percentage (.449).

In 1918, with the Chicago White Sox roster depleted due to World War I, Jacobs joined the team as a backup catcher. He played in 29 games and batted .205. Later that year, he played with a semi-pro team called the Joliet Standards.

Jacobs died in 1955, at the age of 66.
