= Mellie Wolfgang =

American baseball player (1890–1947)

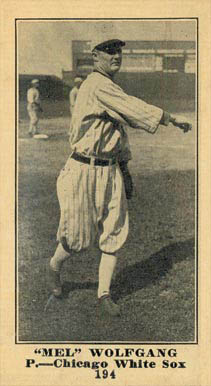
- 1916 baseball card of Wolfgang
- Pitcher
- Born: March 20, 1890; Albany, New York, U.S.
- Died: June 30, 1947 (aged 57); Albany, New York, U.S.
- Batted: Right Threw: Right

MLB debut
- April 18, 1914, for the Chicago White Sox

Last MLB appearance
- July 2, 1918, for the Chicago White Sox

MLB statistics
- Win–loss record: 15–14
- Earned run average: 2.18
- Strikeouts: 111
- Stats at Baseball Reference

Teams
- Chicago White Sox (1914–1918)

Meldon John Wolfgang (March 20, 1890 – June 30, 1947) was an American professional baseball pitcher. He played all or part of five seasons in Major League Baseball for the Chicago White Sox from 1914 to 1918.
