= Frank Fahey (baseball) =

American baseball player (1896-1954)

- Left fielder / pitcher
- Born: January 22, 1896; Milford, Massachusetts, U.S.
- Died: March 19, 1954 (aged 58); Boston, Massachusetts, U.S.
- Batted: Both Threw: Right

MLB debut
- April 25, 1918, for the Philadelphia Athletics

Last MLB appearance
- June 10, 1918, for the Philadelphia Athletics

MLB statistics
- Earned run average: 6.00
- Strikeouts: 1
- WHIP: 2.111
- Batting average: .176
- Hits: 3
- Runs batted in: 1
- Stats at Baseball Reference

Teams
- Philadelphia Athletics (1918)

Francis Raymond Fahey (January 22, 1896 – March 19, 1954) was an American Major League Baseball outfielder and pitcher. He played for the Philadelphia Athletics during the 1918 season.
