= Stan Rees =

American baseball player

- Pitcher
- Born: February 25, 1899; Cynthiana, Kentucky
- Died: August 30, 1937 (aged 38); Lexington, Kentucky
- Batted: Left Threw: Left

MLB debut
- June 12, 1918, for the Washington Senators

Last MLB appearance
- July 19, 1918, for the Washington Senators

MLB statistics
- Win–loss record: 1–0
- Earned run average: 0.00
- Strikeouts: 1
- Stats at Baseball Reference

Teams
- Washington Senators (1918)

Stanley Milton Rees (February 25, 1899 – August 30, 1937), nicknamed "Nellie", was a Major League Baseball pitcher who played with the Washington Senators in 1918.
