= Walter Bernhardt =

American baseball player

- Pitcher
- Born: May 20, 1893; Pleasant Village, Pennsylvania
- Died: July 26, 1958 (aged 65); Watertown, New York
- Batted: Right Threw: Right

MLB debut
- July 16, 1918, for the New York Yankees

Last MLB appearance
- July 16, 1918, for the New York Yankees

MLB statistics
- Win–loss record: 0–0
- Earned run average: 0.00
- Strikeouts: 1
- Stats at Baseball Reference

Teams
- New York Yankees (1918)

Walter Jacob Bernhardt (May 20, 1893 – July 26, 1958) was a Major League Baseball pitcher. Bernhardt played for the New York Yankees in the 1918 season. In one game, he faced two batters, and struck out one of them, and he did not surrender a hit. He batted and threw right-handed. The Yankees released Bernhardt the same week and recalled Bill Lamar from the Toledo Mud Hens. That week, Bernhardt also passed his dental licensing examination in Pennsylvania to become a dentist, one of 250.

He was born in Pleasant Village, Pennsylvania and died in Watertown, New York.
