= Vic Keen =

American baseball player (1899–1976)

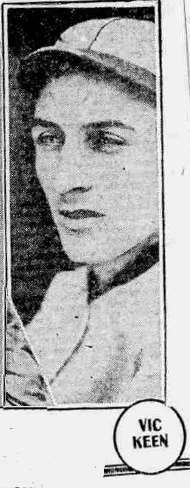
- Pitcher
- Born: March 16, 1899; Bel Air, Maryland, U.S.
- Died: December 10, 1976 (aged 77); Salisbury, Maryland, U.S.
- Batted: Right Threw: Right

MLB debut
- August 13, 1918, for the Philadelphia Athletics

Last MLB appearance
- September 13, 1927, for the St. Louis Cardinals

MLB statistics
- Win–loss record: 42–44
- Earned run average: 4.41
- Strikeouts: 202
- Stats at Baseball Reference

Teams
- Philadelphia Athletics (1918); Chicago Cubs (1921–1925); St. Louis Cardinals (1926–1927)

Career highlights and awards
- World Series champion (1926)

Howard Victor Keen (March 16, 1899 – December 10, 1976) was an American professional baseball pitcher. He played in Major League Baseball (MLB) for the Philadelphia Athletics, Chicago Cubs, and St. Louis Cardinals.

== Early life ==
H. Victor Keen was born in Bethesda, Maryland, to Mollie (née Coale) and Howard O. Keen. He graduated from the University of Maryland and was a member of Sigma Phi Kappa fraternity.

== Career ==
Keen pitched Chicago Cubs and St. Louis Cardinals. He was with the Cardinals in the 1926 World Series.

== Personal life ==
Keen married Thelia Lewis. They had a son, H. Victor Jr. He was a member of Keen Memorial Methodist Church in Baltimore.

Keen died on December 10, 1976, at Peninsula General Hospital in Salisbury. He was buried in First Baptist Cemetery.
