= William Pierson (baseball) =

American baseball player

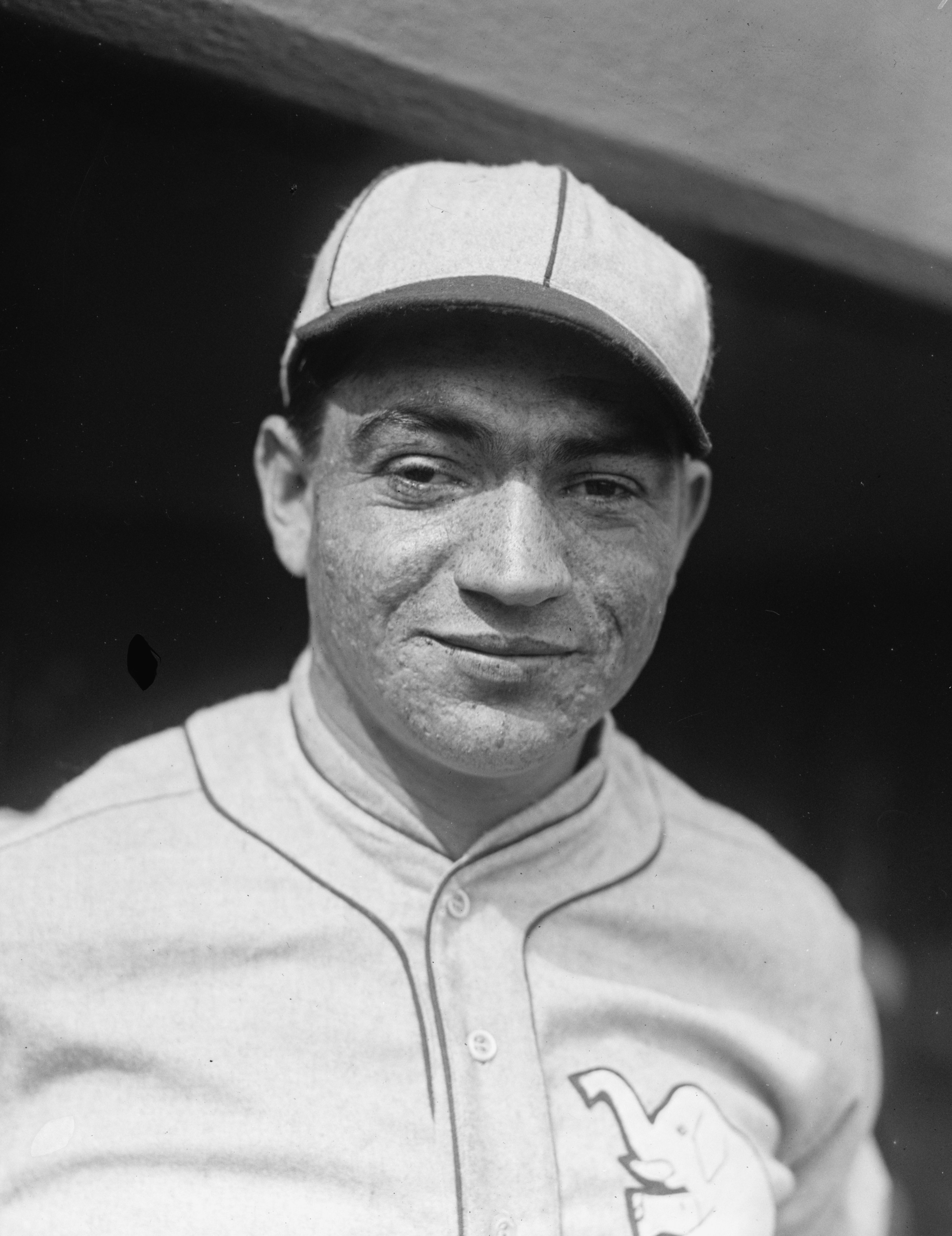
- Pitcher
- Born: June 14, 1899; Atlantic City, New Jersey
- Died: February 20, 1959 (aged 59); Atlantic City, New Jersey
- Batted: Left Threw: Left

MLB debut
- July 4, 1918, for the Philadelphia Athletics

Last MLB appearance
- May 2, 1924, for the Philadelphia Athletics

MLB statistics
- Win–loss record: 0-1
- Earned run average: 3.38
- Strikeouts: 10
- Stats at Baseball Reference

Teams
- Philadelphia Athletics (1918–1919, 1924)

William Morris Pierson (June 14, 1899 – February 20, 1959) was a Major League Baseball pitcher who played from 1918 to 1919, and again in 1924 with the Philadelphia Athletics. He batted and threw left-handed.
