= Bill Pertica =

American baseball player (1898–1967)

- Pitcher
- Born: August 17, 1898; Santa Barbara, California, U.S.
- Died: December 28, 1967 (aged 69); Los Angeles, California, U.S.
- Batted: Right Threw: Right

MLB debut
- August 7, 1918, for the Boston Red Sox

Last MLB appearance
- April 20, 1923, for the St. Louis Cardinals

MLB statistics
- Win–loss record: 22–18
- Earned run average: 4.27
- Strikeouts: 98
- Stats at Baseball Reference

Teams
- Boston Red Sox (1918); St. Louis Cardinals (1921–1923)

William Andrew Pertica (August 17, 1898 – December 28, 1967) was a pitcher in Major League Baseball who played from 1918 through 1923 for the Boston Red Sox (1918) and St. Louis Cardinals (1921–1923). Listed at 5 ft 9 in (1.75 m), 165 lb., Pertica batted and threw right-handed. He was born in Santa Barbara, California.

In a four season-career, Pertica posted a 22–18 record with a 4.27 ERA in 74 appearances, including 46 starts, 17 complete games, two shutouts, two saves, 98 strikeouts, 138 walks, and 331.0 innings of work.

Pertica died at the age of 69 in Los Angeles, California.

== Best season ==
- 1921 - Posted career-highs in wins (14), SO (67), ERA (3.37), and innings pitched (208 1/3).

== Fact ==
- Was a member of the 1918 American League champions Red Sox, although he did not play in the World Series.
