= Lou Bauer =

American baseball player (1898–1979)

- Pitcher
- Born: November 30, 1898; Egg Harbor City, New Jersey
- Died: February 3, 1979 (aged 80); Pomona, New Jersey
- Batted: Right Threw: Right

MLB debut
- August 13, 1918, for the Philadelphia Athletics

Last MLB appearance
- August 13, 1918, for the Philadelphia Athletics

MLB statistics
- Games: 1
- Win–loss record: 0-0
- Walks: 2

Teams
- Philadelphia Athletics (1918)

Louis Walter Bauer (November 30, 1898 – February 4, 1979) was a Major League Baseball pitcher. Bauer played for Philadelphia Athletics in the 1918 season.

He played just one game in his career, giving up two runs, one of them earned, and two walks.

Bauer was born in Egg Harbor City, New Jersey and died in Pomona, New Jersey. He was the 6th youngest player in the 1918 season, at the age of 19.
