= Jake Munch =

American baseball player (1890-1966)

- Outfielder
- Born: November 16, 1890; Morton, Pennsylvania, U.S.
- Died: June 8, 1966 (aged 75); Lansdowne, Pennsylvania, U.S.
- Batted: Left Threw: Left

MLB debut
- May 27, 1918, for the Philadelphia Athletics

Last MLB appearance
- August 27, 1918, for the Philadelphia Athletics

MLB statistics
- Batting average: .267
- Hits: 8
- Runs scored: 3
- Stats at Baseball Reference

Teams
- Philadelphia Athletics (1918)

Jacob Ferdinand Munch (November 16, 1890 - June 8, 1966) was an American Major League Baseball player. He played in 22 games for the Philadelphia Athletics in 1918, mostly as a pinch hitter, although he also played three games in the outfield and two at first base.

== Personal life ==
Munch died at his home in Lansdowne, Pennsylvania, on June 8, 1966.
