= Red Bluhm =

American baseball player (1894–1952)

- Pinch hitter
- Born: June 27, 1894; Cleveland, Ohio, U.S.
- Died: May 7, 1952 (aged 57); Flint, Michigan, U.S.
- Batted: Right Threw: Right

MLB debut
- July 3, 1918, for the Boston Red Sox

Last MLB appearance
- July 3, 1918, for the Boston Red Sox

MLB statistics
- At Bats: 1
- Batting average: .000
- Stats at Baseball Reference

Teams
- Boston Red Sox (1918)

Harvey Fred Bluhm (June 27, 1894 – May 7, 1952), nicknamed "Red", was an American Major League Baseball player for the Boston Red Sox. He batted and threw right-handed.

A native of Cleveland, Ohio, Bluhm started his professional baseball career in 1911 with Youngstown team. He also played for Duluth (1912) and Toledo (1913) and for the Southern Association's New Orleans team in 1914. Bluhm was signed by the Cleveland Indians, also in 1914, but was released before the 1915 season began. Bluhm returned to New Orleans, where he played for the next three seasons.

On July 3, 1918, Bluhm debuted with the Boston Red Sox as a pinch-hitter in a game against the Philadelphia Athletics. He went hit-less in his turn at-bat and never appeared in a major league game again. After that, he played in the International League with Jersey City.

Bluhm died in Flint, Michigan at age 57.
