= Eddie Matteson =

American baseball player (1884-1943)

- Pitcher
- Born: September 7, 1884; Guys Mills, Pennsylvania, U.S.
- Died: September 1, 1943 (aged 58); Westfield, New York, U.S.
- Batted: Right Threw: Right

MLB debut
- May 30, 1914, for the Philadelphia Phillies

Last MLB appearance
- September 1, 1918, for the Washington Senators

MLB statistics
- Win–loss record: 8-5
- Earned run average: 2.36
- Strikeouts: 45
- Stats at Baseball Reference

Teams
- Philadelphia Phillies (1914); Washington Senators (1918)

Henry Edson "Eddie" Matteson (September 7, 1884 – September 1, 1943) was an American Major League Baseball pitcher who played with the Philadelphia Phillies in 1914 and the Washington Senators in 1918. He batted and threw right-handed.

He was born in Guys Mills, Pennsylvania and died in Westfield, New York.
