= Ed Corey =

American baseball player (1894–1970)

- Pitcher
- Born: July 13, 1894; Chicago, Illinois, U.S.
- Died: September 17, 1970 (aged 76); Kenosha, Wisconsin, U.S.
- Batted: Right Threw: Right

MLB debut
- July 2, 1918, for the Chicago White Sox

Last MLB appearance
- July 2, 1918, for the Chicago White Sox

MLB statistics
- Win–loss record: 0–0
- Earned run average: 4.50
- Strikeouts: 0
- Stats at Baseball Reference

Teams
- Chicago White Sox (1918)

Edward Norman "Ike" Corey (born Ed Cohen from July 13, 1894, to September 17, 1970) was an American Major League Baseball pitcher. Corey played one game in his career, in the 1918 season, with the Chicago White Sox. He pitched two innings, giving up one run, on two hits, with one walk allowed. He had a 4.50 ERA.

Corey was born in Chicago, Illinois and died in Kenosha, Wisconsin, and was Jewish.
