= Bob Geary (baseball) =

American baseball player (1891–1980)

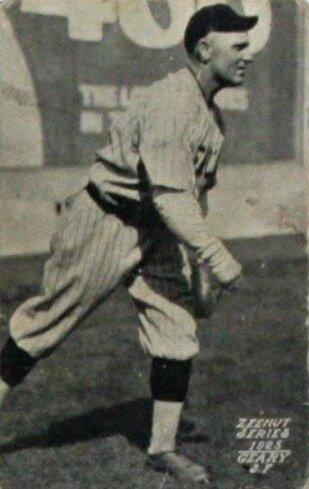
- Pitcher
- Born: May 10, 1891; Cincinnati, Ohio, U.S.
- Died: January 3, 1980 (aged 88); Cincinnati, Ohio, U.S.
- Batted: Right Threw: Right

MLB debut
- April 25, 1918, for the Philadelphia Athletics

Last MLB appearance
- September 28, 1921, for the Cincinnati Reds

MLB statistics
- Win–loss record: 3-9
- Earned run average: 3.46
- Strikeouts: 41
- Stats at Baseball Reference

Teams
- Philadelphia Athletics (1918–1919); Cincinnati Reds (1921)

Robert Norton Geary (May 10, 1891 – January 3, 1980) was an American Major League Baseball pitcher. He played for the Philadelphia Athletics during the 1918 and 1919 seasons and the Cincinnati Reds during the 1921 season.

In 1918 Geary served in the military during World War I.
