= Chick Holmes =

American baseball player (1896–1954)

- Pitcher
- Born: March 22, 1896; Beverly, New Jersey, U.S.
- Died: April 15, 1954 (aged 58); Camden, New Jersey, U.S.
- Threw: Right

MLB debut
- June 27, 1918, for the Philadelphia Athletics

Last MLB appearance
- June 27, 1918, for the Philadelphia Athletics

MLB statistics
- Win–loss record: 0–0
- Earned run average: 13.50
- Strikeouts: 0
- Stats at Baseball Reference

Teams
- Philadelphia Athletics (1918)

Elwood Marter Holmes (March 22, 1896 – April 15, 1954) was an American Major League Baseball pitcher. He played for the Philadelphia Athletics during the 1918 season.
