= Ed Monroe =

American baseball player (1895–1969)

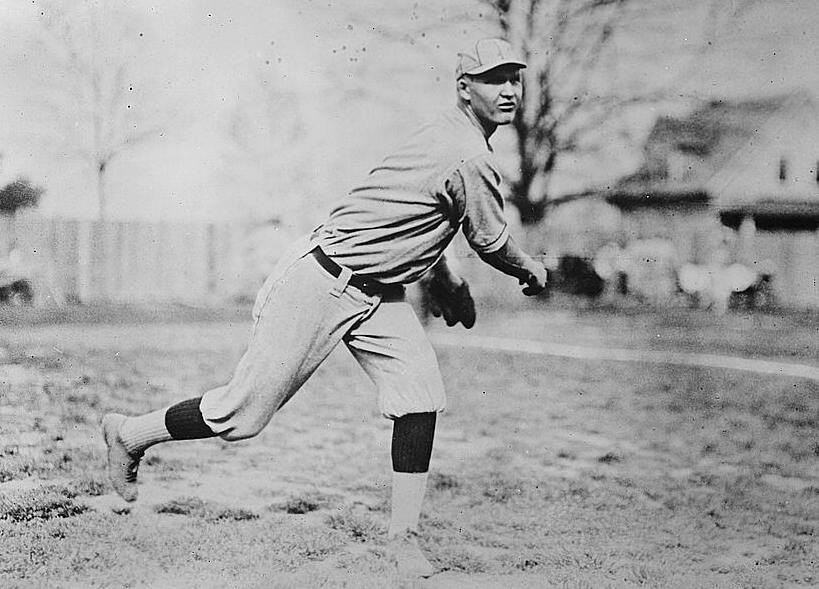
- Pitcher
- Born: February 22, 1895; Louisville, Kentucky, U.S.
- Died: April 29, 1969 (aged 74); Louisville, Kentucky, U.S.
- Batted: Right Threw: Right

MLB debut
- May 29, 1917, for the New York Yankees

Last MLB appearance
- April 19, 1918, for the New York Yankees

MLB statistics
- Win–loss record: 1–0
- Earned run average: 3.52
- Strikeouts: 13
- Stats at Baseball Reference

Teams
- New York Yankees (1917–1918)

Edward Oliver "Peck" Monroe (February 22, 1895 – April 29, 1969) was an American Major League Baseball pitcher. Monroe played for the New York Yankees in 1917 and 1918. In ten career games, he had a 1–0 record, with a 3.52 ERA. He batted and threw right-handed.

Monroe was born and died in Louisville, Kentucky. The Jeffersontown, Ky., "Jeffersonian" (Aug. 28, 1913) reported that Monroe pitched for "Fanelli Bros." in Jeffersontown in 1912, and the team's manager, Walter Harris, was credited with his development as a pitcher. As he left Louisville for a tryout with the Chicago White Sox in 1913, Monroe was reported to have been 18 years old, 6-feet-4-inches tall and 190 pounds.
