= Bugs Bennett =

American baseball player (1892–1957)

- Pitcher
- Born: April 19, 1892; Kansas City, Missouri, US
- Died: November 21, 1957 (aged 65); Noel, Missouri, US
- Batted: Right Threw: Right

MLB debut
- July 20, 1918, for the St. Louis Browns

Last MLB appearance
- August 8, 1921, for the Chicago White Sox

MLB statistics
- Win–loss record: 0–5
- Earned run average: 6.68
- Strikeouts: 5
- Stats at Baseball Reference

Teams
- St. Louis Browns (1918, 1921); Chicago White Sox (1921)

Joseph Harley "Bugs" Bennett (April 19, 1892 – November 21, 1957) was an American professional baseball pitcher in Major League Baseball. He played for the St. Louis Browns and Chicago White Sox.
