= Roy Hansen =

American baseball player

- Pitcher
- Born: March 6, 1898; Beloit, Wisconsin
- Died: February 9, 1977 (aged 78); Beloit, Wisconsin
- Batted: Right Threw: Right

MLB debut
- May 28, 1918, for the Washington Senators

Last MLB appearance
- July 4, 1918, for the Washington Senators

MLB statistics
- Win–loss record: 1–0
- Earned run average: 3.00
- Strikeouts: 2
- Stats at Baseball Reference

Teams
- Washington Senators (1918)

Roy Inglof Hansen (March 6, 1898 – February 9, 1977) was a pitcher in Major League Baseball. He played for the Washington Senators in 1918.
