= Merito Acosta =

Cuban baseball player (1896-1963)

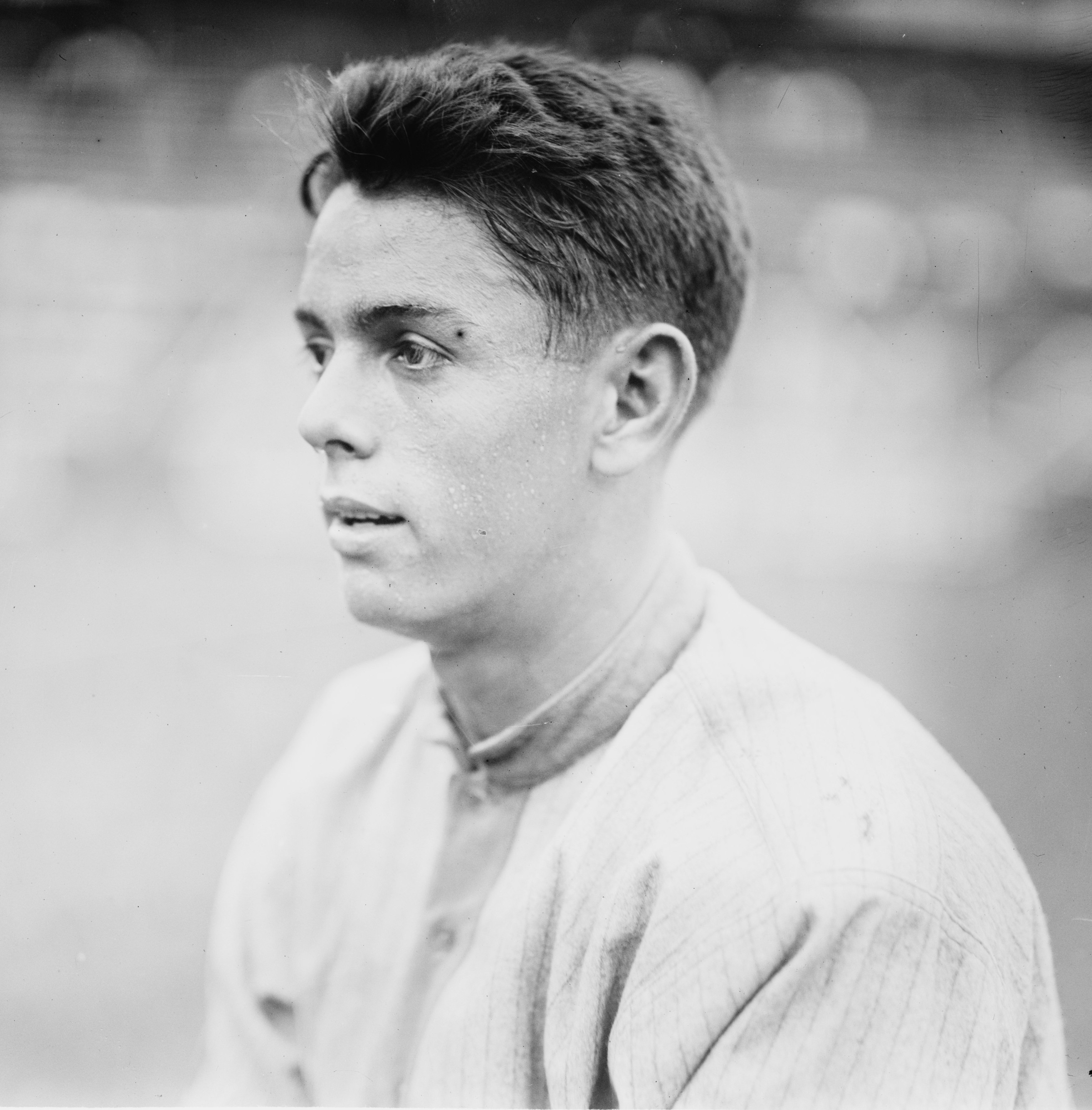
- Outfielder
- Born: May 19, 1896; Bauta, Cuba
- Died: November 17, 1963 (aged 67); Miami, Florida, U.S.
- Batted: Left Threw: Left

MLB debut
- June 5, 1913, for the Washington Senators

Last MLB appearance
- September 2, 1918, for the Philadelphia Athletics

MLB statistics
- Batting average: .255
- Home runs: 0
- Runs batted in: 37
- Stats at Baseball Reference

Teams
- Washington Senators (1913–1916, 1918); Philadelphia Athletics (1918)

Member of the Cuban

Baseball Hall of Fame
- Induction: 1955

Baldomero Pedro "Merito" Acosta Fernández (May 19, 1896 – November 17, 1963) was a Cuban outfielder in Major League Baseball who played five seasons for the Philadelphia Athletics and Washington Senators.

Acosta played winter baseball in the Cuban League from 1913 to 1925 and was also a long-time manager and part-owner of the Havana Cubans. In the 1918/19 season, Acosta made an unassisted triple play while playing center field. With the bases loaded, he sprinted in to catch the ball, then continued to touch second base before the runner could return and tagged the runner from first base. In his first season as a manager, 1922/23, he led a brand new franchise, Marianao, to a championship. Acosta was elected to the Cuban Baseball Hall of Fame in 1955.
