= Pat Hardgrove =

American baseball player (1895–1973)

- Pinch hitter
- Born: May 10, 1895; Palmyra, Kansas, U.S.
- Died: January 26, 1973 (aged 77); Jackson, Mississippi, U.S.
- Batted: Right Threw: Right

MLB debut
- June 8, 1918, for the Chicago White Sox

Last MLB appearance
- June 13, 1918, for the Chicago White Sox

MLB statistics
- Games played: 2
- At bats: 2
- Hits: 0
- Stats at Baseball Reference

Teams
- Chicago White Sox (1918)

William Henry "Pat" Hardgrove (May 10, 1895 – January 26, 1973) was an American pinch hitter in Major League Baseball. He played for the Chicago White Sox in 1918. He played third base in the minor leagues from 1912–25.
