= Ed Hovlik =

American baseball player (1891-1955)

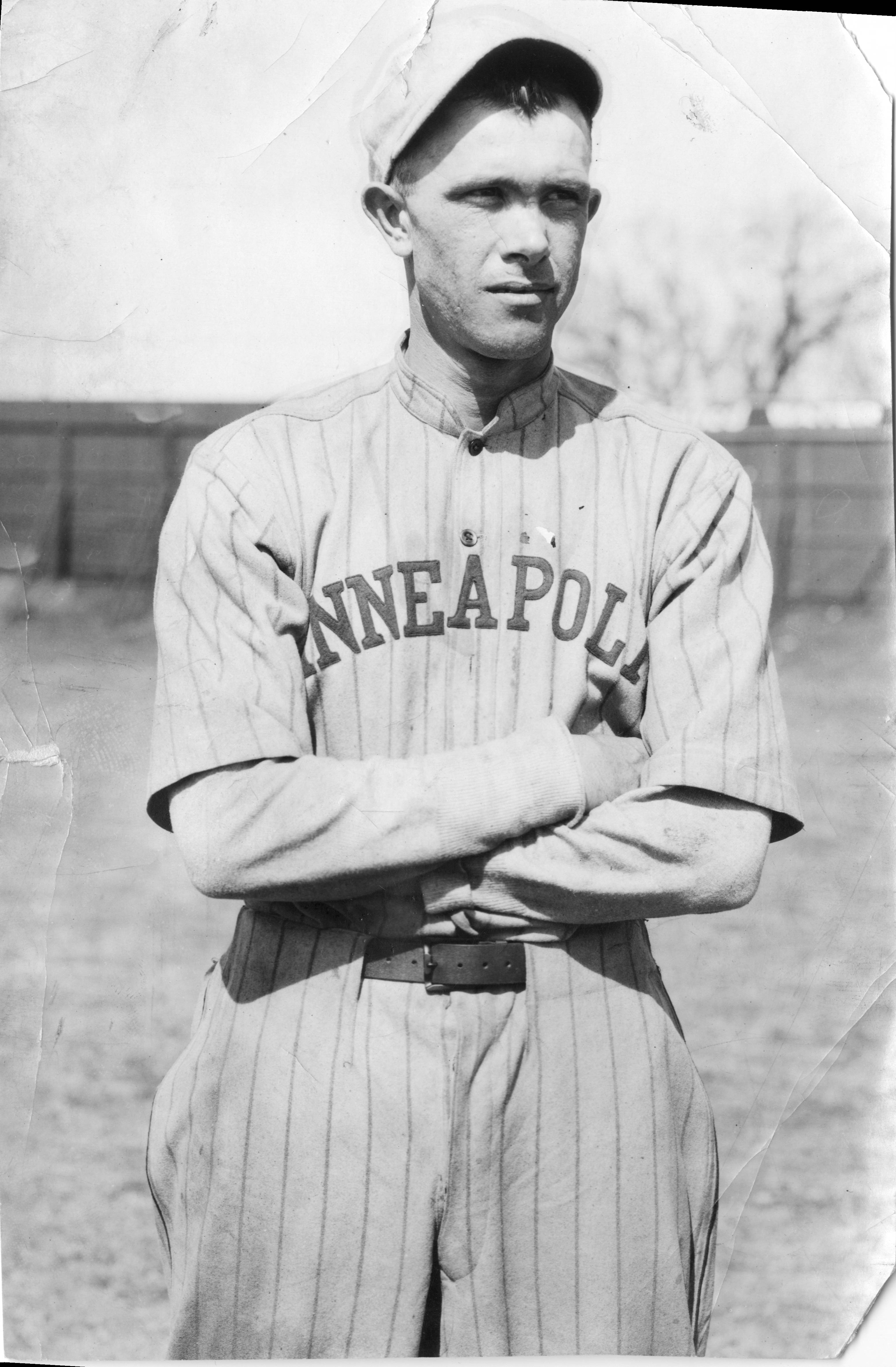
- Pitcher
- Born: August 20, 1891; Cleveland, Ohio, U.S.
- Died: March 19, 1955 (aged 63); Painesville, Ohio, U.S.
- Batted: Right Threw: Right

MLB debut
- July 14, 1918, for the Washington Senators

Last MLB appearance
- May 4, 1919, for the Washington Senators

MLB statistics
- Win–loss record: 2-1
- Earned run average: 3.21
- Strikeouts: 13
- Stats at Baseball Reference

Teams
- Washington Senators (1918–1919)

Edward Charles Hovlik (August 20, 1891 – March 19, 1955) was an American pitcher in Major League Baseball. He played for the Washington Senators.
