= John Peters (catcher) =

American baseball player (1893–1932)

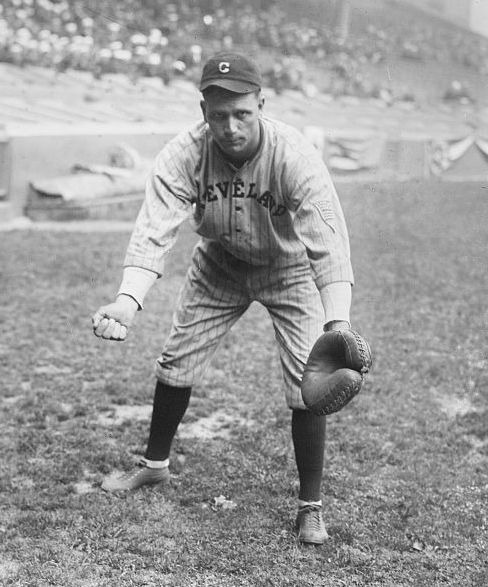
- Catcher
- Born: July 14, 1893; Kansas City, Kansas, U.S.
- Died: February 21, 1932 (aged 38); Kansas City, Missouri, U.S.
- Batted: Right Threw: Right

MLB debut
- May 1, 1915, for the Detroit Tigers

Last MLB appearance
- September 25, 1922, for the Philadelphia Phillies

MLB statistics
- Batting average: .265
- Home runs: 7
- Runs batted in: 47
- Stats at Baseball Reference

Teams
- Detroit Tigers (1915); Cleveland Indians (1918); Philadelphia Phillies (1921–1922)

John William Peters (July 14, 1893 – February 21, 1932) was an American reserve catcher in Major League Baseball who played in parts of four seasons for the Detroit Tigers (1915), Cleveland Indians (1918) and Philadelphia Phillies (1921–1922). Peters batted and threw right-handed.

== Biography ==
He was born in Kansas City, Kansas.

In 112 games, Peters was a .265 hitter (80-for-132) with seven home runs, 22 runs, and 47 RBI.

Peters died in Kansas City at the age of 38.

== Sources ==
- Baseball Reference
- Retrosheet
