= Wickey McAvoy =

American baseball player (1894–1973)

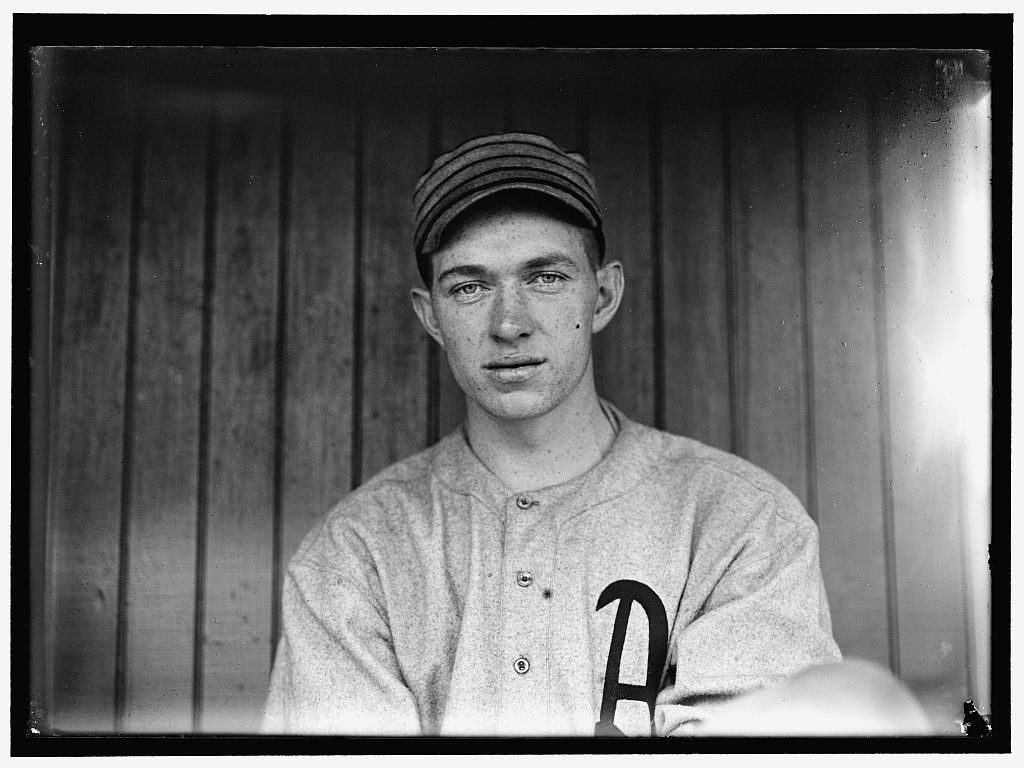
- McAvoy in 1914
- Catcher
- Born: October 20, 1894; Rochester, New York, U.S.
- Died: July 6, 1973 (aged 78); Rochester, New York, U.S.
- Batted: Right Threw: Right

MLB debut
- September 29, 1913, for the Philadelphia Athletics

Last MLB appearance
- September 16, 919, for the Philadelphia Athletics

MLB statistics
- Batting average: .199
- Home runs: 1
- Runs batted in: 53
- Stats at Baseball Reference

Teams
- Philadelphia Athletics (1913–1915, 1917–1919)

James Eugene "Wickey" McAvoy (October 20, 1894 – July 6, 1973) was an American professional baseball player. He played part or all of six seasons in Major League Baseball between 1913 and 1919 for the Philadelphia Athletics, primarily as a catcher. After his major league career, he continued to play minor league baseball until 1928.

== Major League Baseball career ==
Wickey made his major league debut on September 29, 1913 at the age of 18 as a catcher for the Philadelphia Athletics. He continued to play for the Athletics on-and-off again until September 16, 1919. His career batting average in the major leagues was .199. He played the greatest number of games in 1915 (64 games), 1918 (74 games), and 1919 (57 games).

== Minor League Baseball career ==
Wickey played minor league baseball for the Baltimore Orioles for part of the season in 1914, 1916, 1917, 1922, and 1923. He was part of the International League Championship teams in 1922 and 1923. With a batting average of .310 in 1922, Wickey had several key hits that attributed to the Orioles taking the pennant in 1922.

Wickey returned to his hometown of Rochester, New York in 1923 and played for the Rochester Tribe in 1923, 1926, and 1927. Wickey's career also included two seasons with the Buffalo Bisons in 1924 and 1925. In 1928, Wickey played his last season in the minor leagues for the Reading Keystones. He ended his career in 1929 at the age of 34 playing for the Elmira Colonels in the New York-Pennsylvania League.

== Personal life ==
Wickey married Bessie Peterson of Kenosha, Wisconsin on April 12, 1923. Wickey and Bessie met in 1921 when Wickey was playing independent baseball in Kenosha. They had two children Elaine (McAvoy) Fischer and William "Billy" McAvoy.

== External Sources ==
- Wickey McAvoy at SABR Bio Project
