= Joe Cobb (baseball) =

American baseball player (1895–1947)

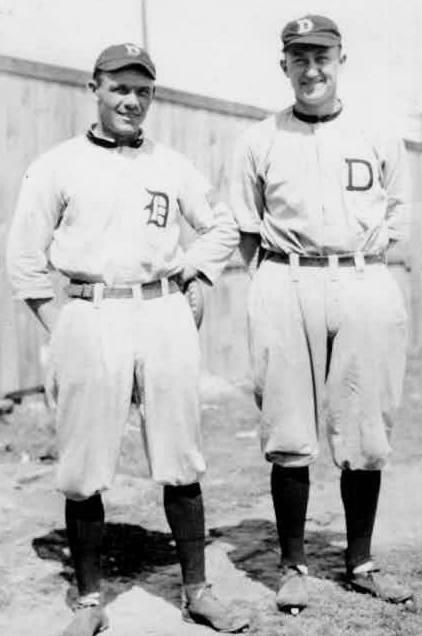
- Joe Cobb (left) with teammate Ty Cobb (no relation)
- Catcher
- Born: January 24, 1895; Hudson, Pennsylvania, U.S.
- Died: December 24, 1947 (aged 52); Allentown, Pennsylvania, U.S.
- Batted: Right Threw: Right

MLB debut
- April 25, 1918, for the Detroit Tigers

Last MLB appearance
- April 25, 1918, for the Detroit Tigers

MLB statistics
- Plate appearances: 1
- Stats at Baseball Reference

Teams
- Detroit Tigers (1918)

Joseph Stanley Cobb (January 24, 1895 – December 24, 1947), born Joseph Stanley Serafin, was an American baseball catcher. He played professional baseball for 12 years between 1917 and 1931, including one game in Major League Baseball for the Detroit Tigers on April 25, 1918. He was the starting catcher and batted .320 for both the 1923 and 1924 Baltimore Orioles, teams that are ranked as the 19th and fifth best minor league team in baseball history.

== Early years ==
Cobb was born Joseph Stanley Serafin in Hudson, Pennsylvania, in 1895. Before playing professional baseball, he worked as a coal miner. He joked that his agility could be attributed to "avoiding rampaging mules" when working in the coal mines. He was five feet, nine inches tall, weighed 170 pounds and was a right-handed batter and fielder.

== Professional baseball ==
=== Minor leagues ===
Cobb began playing professional baseball in 1917 with the Cumberland club in the Blue Ridge League. He appeared in 19 games and compiled a .385 batting average and .538 slugging percentage in 65 at bats.

=== Detroit Tigers ===
After playing only 19 minor league games but compiling a .385 average, Cobb joined the Detroit Tigers in January 1918. After observing Cobb in spring training, Detroit sports writer Harry Bullion wrote that Cobb displayed "astonishing form" throwing to the bases" and was "cool as the proverbial iceberg, ruffles at nothing, and is never caught making the wrong play." Bullion added that one of Cobb's strongest boosters was Ty Cobb, though the two were not relatives. On April 13, 1918, he had three hits in five at bats and scored two runs in an exhibition game against the Cincinnati Reds.

Cobb appeared in only one major league game, an 8-4 loss to the Cleveland Indians on April 25, 1918. Cobb was a pinch hitter for pitcher Rudy Kallio in the bottom of the eighth inning, and did not appear in the field. A discrepancy in baseball records exists; according to his career record, Cobb drew a base on balls in his only major league plate appearance to compile a 1.000 career on-base percentage. However, the contemporary published box score for the one major league game Cobb played shows him going 0-for-1, and the more recently compiled Baseball Reference box score shows Cobb striking out in his one at-bat.

=== Return to minors ===
After his brief stint with the Tigers, Cobb was assigned to the St. Paul Saints. He appeared in 11 games for the Saints. On May 15, 1918, Cobb passed his physical examination for the Army and was scheduled to report for duty on June 1, 1918. When Cobb reported to the Army, it was revealed that his real name was Joseph Stanley Serafin. As of mid-June 1918, Cobb was still playing baseball when he was returned to Detroit by St. Paul and then assigned to Syracuse. By late July 1918, Cobb was reported to be in the Army.

In 1919, he began the season with the San Antonio Aces in the Texas League. He broke his hand during a game with San Antonio and was released on May 1, 1919, to the Jersey City Skeeters to recuperate from his injury and then resume playing. He appeared in 100 games for Jersey City and compiled a .232 batting average.

After the 1919 season Cobb played at the semi-pro level. He played during the 1920 season with the independent Carnegie Steel Company team in Farrell, Pennsylvania, also known as the Farrell Steel club. He returned to his home in Plains, Pennsylvania, in July 1920 after his wife suffered a severe injury. In 1921, he played for the Massillon Agathons.

In 1923, Cobb returned to the higher levels of the minor leagues. He began the season with the Jersey City Skeeters and, on June 3, 1923, he was sold to the Baltimore Orioles of the International League. Cobb appeared in 83 games for the 1923 Orioles, hit .320 and totaled 72 runs, 80 RBIs, 215 total bases, 19 doubles, 12 triples and 15 home runs. He was the starting catcher for the 1923 Baltimore team that compiled a 111-53 record and is ranked as the 19th best minor league team in baseball history. After the Orioles won the 1923 pennant, The Sporting News wrote an article describing Joe Cobb's role on the team: "[Manager] Dunn's first moves were to obtain catcher Joe Cobb from Jersey City . . . and to sign veteran pitcher Chief Bender. The addition of the peppy Cobb put new life in the Orioles."

In 1924, after a brief holdout, Cobb returned to the Orioles. The 1924 Orioles compiled a 117-48 record and are rated as the fifth best minor league team in baseball history. Cobb was named to the International League's 1924 all-star team and hit .320 with 84 RBIs and 75 runs. Cobb also had the distinction of catching for future Hall of Famer Lefty Grove, who had his breakout year with the 1924 Orioles, going 26-6.

Cobb continued to play in the high minor leagues for Baltimore through 1926 and then for the Jersey City Skeeters (1926-1927), Wichita Falls Spudders (1927-1928), and Fort Worth Panthers (1928), before slipping to Class B ball where he played from 1929 to 1931. In 1931, Cobb was player-manager of the Harrisburg Senators of the New York–Pennsylvania League. In 1932, he was hired as the manager of the Plains team in the Wyoming League.

== Later years ==
Joe Cobb died in 1947 at age 52 in Allentown, Pennsylvania.
