= Marty Kavanagh =

American baseball player (1891–1960)

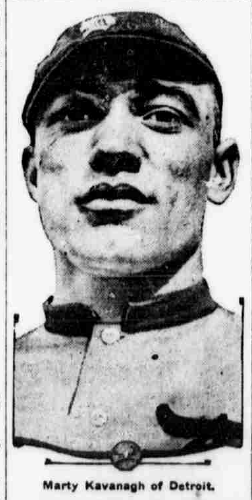
- Second baseman
- Born: June 13, 1891; Harrison, New Jersey, U.S.
- Died: July 28, 1960 (aged 69); Taylor, Michigan, U.S.
- Batted: Right Threw: Right

MLB debut
- April 18, 1914, for the Detroit Tigers

Last MLB appearance
- August 8, 1918, for the Detroit Tigers

MLB statistics
- Batting average: .249
- Home runs: 10
- Runs batted in: 122
- Stats at Baseball Reference

Teams
- Detroit Tigers (1914–1916); Cleveland Indians (1916–1918); St. Louis Cardinals (1918); Detroit Tigers (1918)

Martin Joseph Kavanagh (June 13, 1891 – July 28, 1960) was an American professional baseball player. He played for six years from 1913 to 1918, including five seasons in Major League Baseball with the Detroit Tigers (1914–1916, 1918), Cleveland Indians (1916–1917), and St. Louis Cardinals (1918). He appeared in 370 major league games, 172 as a second baseman, 73 as a first baseman, 23 as an outfielder, three as a third baseman, and two as a shortstop. During his major league career, he compiled a .249 batting average and a .330 on-base percentage.

== Early years ==
Kavanagh was born in Harrison, New Jersey, in 1891. His parents Charles and Mary Kavanagh immigrated from Ireland in 1886. At the time of the 1900 U.S. Census, his father worked as a day laborer.

== Professional baseball ==
Kavanagh began his professional career in 1913 with the York White Roses of the Tri-State League. In 111 games with the White Roses, he had a .357 batting average.

After the season, the Detroit Tigers bought his contract, and he made his major league debut the following season on April 18, 1914. In July 1914, Kavanagh forgot to set his alarm and missed part of a game; backup infielder Billy Purtell's poor play led to the Tigers losing the game as a result. Kavanagh finished the 1914 season with a .248 batting average and 16 stolen bases in 128 games. In 1915, he had his best year in professional baseball. In 113 games, 44 at first base and 42 at second base, he had a .295 batting average and 13 triples. In 1916, Kavanagh struggled; his average fell to .141 in 58 games for the Tigers.

On September 2, 1916, the Tigers released Kavanagh, and he joined the Cleveland Indians. He played 19 games for the Indians in the final month of the 1916 season. In one of those games, on September 24, Kavanagh hit a grand slam as a pinch hitter, the first time in American League history that had happened. He appeared in 14 games with the Indians in 1917 and 13 to start the 1918 season.

On May 25, 1918, Kavanagh signed with the St. Louis Cardinals. He spent the rest of the 1918 season with the Cardinals, the minor league Milwaukee Brewers, and the Tigers, retiring from the game after the season ended.

In 370 major league games, he had a .249 batting average and .330 on-base percentage.

== Later years ==
Kavanagh was married to Elizabeth "Bessie" Fitzsimmons on December 2, 1916. They had two sons, Martin, Jr., born in 1918, and Eugene, born in 1921.

After retiring from professional baseball, Kavanagh worked as an iron worker in the construction industry. He was also a manager in the Detroit Amateur Baseball Federation. He died in Taylor, Michigan, in 1960 at age 69.
