= Happy Finneran =

American baseball player (1890–1942)

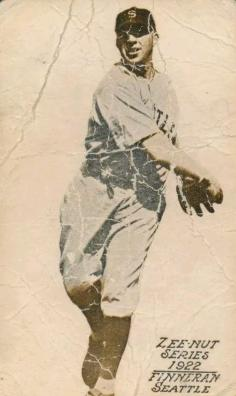
- Pitcher
- Born: October 29, 1890; East Orange, New Jersey, U.S.
- Died: February 3, 1942 (aged 51); Orange, New Jersey, U.S.
- Batted: Right Threw: Right

MLB debut
- August 20, 1912, for the Philadelphia Phillies

Last MLB appearance
- September 1, 1918, for the New York Yankees

MLB statistics
- Win–loss record: 25–33
- Earned run average: 3.30
- Strikeouts: 168
- Stats at Baseball Reference

Teams
- Philadelphia Phillies (1912–1913); Brooklyn Tip-Tops (1914–1915); Detroit Tigers (1918); New York Yankees (1918)

Joseph Ignatius Finneran (October 29, 1890 – February 3, 1942), nicknamed "Happy" or "Smokey Joe", was an American pitcher who played for 5 seasons in Major League Baseball in the 1910s.

He made his major league debut for the Philadelphia Phillies on August 20, 1912, in a relief role in a losing effort versus the Chicago Cubs. Finneran served as a partner in an undertaking firm in Orange before establishing his own company in 1929. Finneran died at St. Mary's Hospital in Orange on February 3, 1942 due to pneumonia at age 50.

== Sources ==
- Career statistics from Baseball Reference · Baseball Reference (Minors) · Retrosheet · Baseball Almanac
