= Roy Sanders (American League pitcher) =

American baseball player

- Pitcher
- Born: June 10, 1894; Pittsburg, Kansas, U.S.
- Died: July 8, 1963 (aged 69); Louisville, Kentucky, U.S.
- Batted: Right Threw: Right

MLB debut
- August 6, 1918, for the New York Yankees

Last MLB appearance
- May 31, 1920, for the St. Louis Browns

MLB statistics
- Win–loss record: 1–3
- Strikeouts: 10
- Earned run average: 4.60
- Stats at Baseball Reference

Teams
- New York Yankees (1918); St. Louis Browns (1920)

Roy Lee Sanders (June 10, 1894 – July 8, 1963) was an American Major League Baseball pitcher. Sanders played for the New York Yankees in 1918 and the St. Louis Browns in 1920. In 14 career games, he had a 1–3 record, with a 4.60 ERA. He batted and threw right-handed.

Sanders was born in Pittsburg, Kansas. After baseball, Sanders became an employee for the Oertel Brewing Company in Louisville, Kentucky from 1935 to 1960. He died on July 8, 1963 at the Saint Joseph Infirmary in Louisville, age 69. His funeral was at Louisville Memorial Gardens on July 11.
