= Jack Coffey (baseball) =

American baseball player (1887–1966)

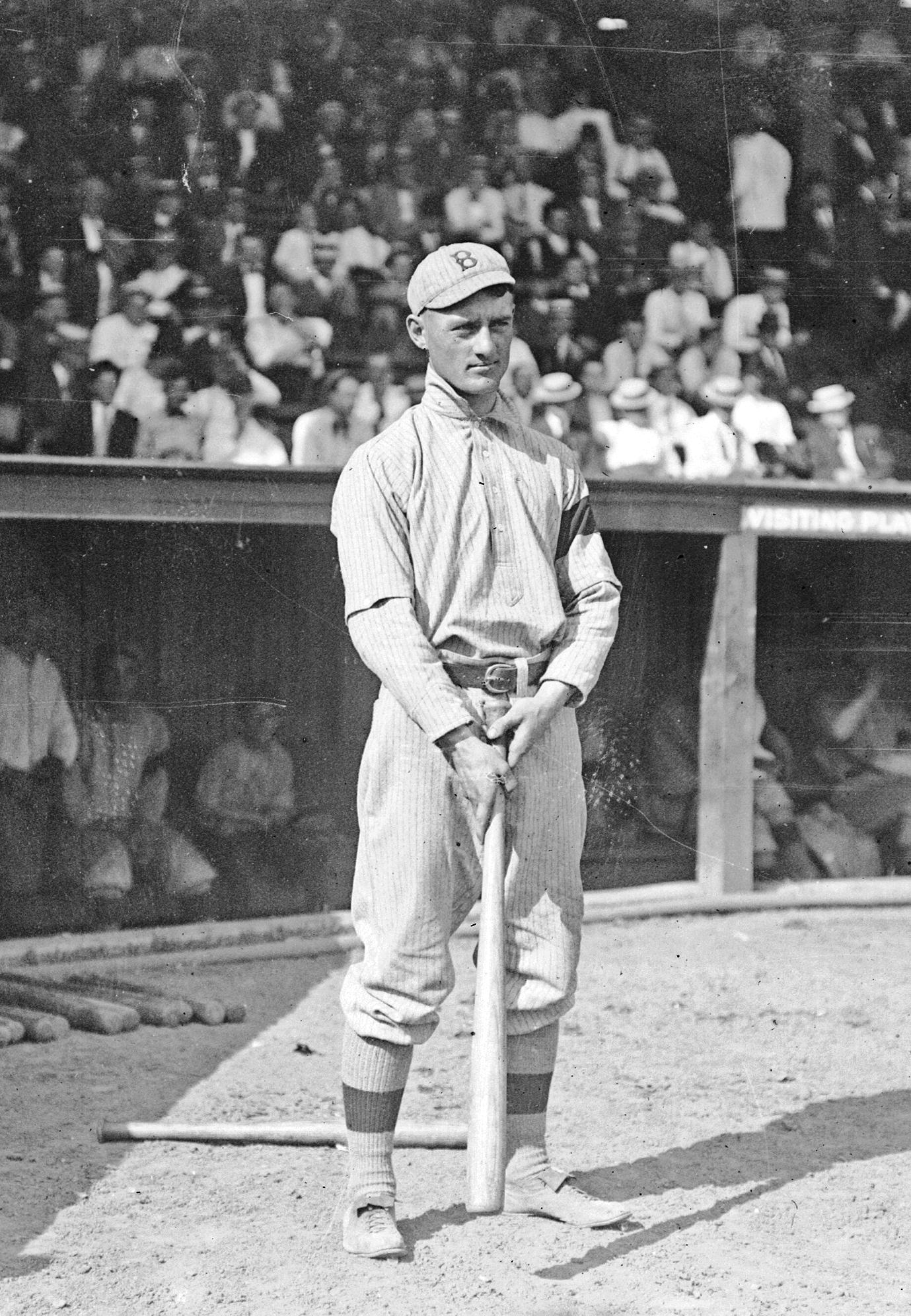
- Infielder
- Born: January 28, 1887; New York, New York, U.S.
- Died: February 14, 1966 (aged 79); The Bronx, New York, U.S.
- Batted: Right Threw: Right

MLB debut
- June 23, 1909, for the Boston Doves

Last MLB appearance
- September 2, 1918, for the Boston Red Sox

MLB statistics
- Batting average: .188
- Home runs: 1
- Runs batted in: 26
- Stats at Baseball Reference

Teams
- Boston Doves (1909); Detroit Tigers (1918); Boston Red Sox (1918)

John Francis Coffey (January 28, 1887 – February 14, 1966) was an American infielder for the Boston Doves (1909), Detroit Tigers (1918) and Boston Red Sox (1918).

Coffey graduated from Fordham University in 1910. While still in college, he was signed by the Doves and played 73 games; it was very common in those days for college players to play in the major leagues as well. He then spent most of the next 16 years in the minors, seeing his only other major-league action in 1918. He started that season playing 22 games with the Tigers before being sold to the Red Sox in mid-August. He was listed as a possible replacement for the injured Dave Shean, but never got a chance to play in the World Series. Coffey is the only player to play with both Ty Cobb and Babe Ruth in the same season (1918 Tigers and Red Sox).

In two seasons, he played in 110 games and had 368 at bats with 33 runs, 69 hits, 5 doubles, 6 triples, 1 home run, 26 RBI, 6 stolen bases, 22 walks, a .188 batting average, .241 on-base percentage and a .242 slugging percentage.

While still actively playing, he became the part-time coach at his alma mater, holding that post until 1918. He returned in 1922 as the school's first full-time coach and remained there until 1958 (Fordham did not field a team in 1944), amassing 1,160 wins. The University's baseball field is named in his honor. From 1926 to 1958, he also served as athletic director.

He died in the Bronx, New York, at the age of 79.

== See also ==
- List of college baseball career coaching wins leaders
