= 1918 in baseball =

The following are the baseball events of the year 1918 throughout the world.

== Champions ==
- World Series: Boston Red Sox over Chicago Cubs (4–2)

== Statistical leaders ==
	American League		National League	
Stat	Player	Total	Player	Total
AVG	Ty Cobb (DET)	.382	Zack Wheat (BRO)	.335
HR	Babe Ruth (BOS); Tillie Walker (PHA)	11	Gavvy Cravath (PHI)	8
RBI	Bobby Veach (DET)	84	Sherry Magee (CIN)	76
W	Walter Johnson^{1} (WSH)	23	Hippo Vaughn^{2} (CHC)	22
ERA	Walter Johnson^{1} (WSH)	1.27	Hippo Vaughn^{2} (CHC)	1.74
K	Walter Johnson^{1} (WSH)	162	Hippo Vaughn^{2} (CHC)	148

^{1} Major league Triple Crown pitching winner
^{2} National League Triple Crown pitching winner

== Major league baseball final standings ==
=== American League final standings ===
American League
Team	W	L	Pct.	GB	Home	Road
Boston Red Sox	75	51	.595	—	49‍–‍21	26‍–‍30
Cleveland Indians	73	54	.575	2½	38‍–‍22	35‍–‍32
Washington Senators	72	56	.562	4	41‍–‍32	31‍–‍24
New York Yankees	60	63	.488	13½	37‍–‍29	23‍–‍34
St. Louis Browns	58	64	.475	15	23‍–‍30	35‍–‍34
Chicago White Sox	57	67	.460	17	30‍–‍26	27‍–‍41
Detroit Tigers	55	71	.437	20	28‍–‍29	27‍–‍42
Philadelphia Athletics	52	76	.406	24	35‍–‍32	17‍–‍44

Locations of teams for the 1915–1922 American League seasons
American League

=== National League final standings ===
National League
Team	W	L	Pct.	GB	Home	Road
Chicago Cubs	84	45	.651	—	49‍–‍25	35‍–‍20
New York Giants	71	53	.573	10½	35‍–‍21	36‍–‍32
Cincinnati Reds	68	60	.531	15½	46‍–‍24	22‍–‍36
Pittsburgh Pirates	65	60	.520	17	42‍–‍28	23‍–‍32
Brooklyn Robins	57	69	.452	25½	33‍–‍21	24‍–‍48
Philadelphia Phillies	55	68	.447	26	27‍–‍29	28‍–‍39
Boston Braves	53	71	.427	28½	23‍–‍29	30‍–‍42
St. Louis Cardinals	51	78	.395	33	32‍–‍40	19‍–‍38

Locations of teams for the 1916–1919 National League seasons
National League

== Events ==
=== March ===
- March 23 – The Boston Red Sox played an exhibition game against the Brooklyn Dodgers at the Army cantonment at Camp Pike in Arkansas featuring Babe Ruth hitting five home runs and spawning the Boston American headline: "Babe Ruth Puts Five Over Fence, Heretofore Unknown to Baseball Fans."

=== April ===
- April 15 – The American League season opened with Boston Red Sox ace Babe Ruth pitching a four-hit, 7–1 victory over the Philadelphia Athletics. Shortly after, Boston manager Ed Barrow started Ruth's conversion to slugger by working him into seventy-two games as an outfielder–first baseman.
- April 18 – Cleveland Indians center fielder Tris Speaker turned an unassisted double play against the Detroit Tigers. Eleven days later, Speaker duplicated the feat against the Chicago White Sox for the fourth unassisted double play of his career to set a franchise record for an outfielder that he would later share with teammate Elmer Smith.

=== May ===
- May 14 – Sunday baseball was officially legalized in Washington, D.C. after district commissioners finally rescinded the ban in response to the large increase in the city's wartime population and the need for more recreational activities.
- May 19 – Babe Ruth fell ill. His temperature climbed to 104 degrees, his body ached, he shivered with chills, and his throat throbbed. He had all the symptoms of the Spanish Flu, but was treated with silver nitrate for tonsillitis which worsened his condition to the point where he was admitted to Massachusetts General Hospital. After a significant scare, he recovered about a week later.
- May 23 – General Enoch Crowder, provost marshal of the Army who constructed the Selective Service Act, commonly known as "the draft", issued an order that stated young men should get into essential work by July 1 or face induction into the armed services. The "Work or Fight" rule exempted theatrical performers such as actors, singers and musicians because they provided "essential recreation" but baseball players got no such exemption.

=== June ===
- June 3 – Dutch Leonard tosses the second no-hitter of his career, leading the Boston Red Sox to a 5–0 victory over the Detroit Tigers.
- June 5 – Lieutenant Leon Cadore, on leave from his military duties, throws a four hitter for Brooklyn as the Dodgers beat the Cardinals, 2–0 at Ebbets Field. While on furlough, Cadore appeared in two games for the Dodgers this season.
- June 13 – St. Louis Cardinals outfielder Cliff Heathcote hits for the cycle against the Philadelphia Phillies. The game would be called for darkness with the score tied 8–8.

=== July ===
- July 19 – Newton Baker, Secretary of War, re-affirmed the position that baseball was not essential following an appeal by Washington Senators catcher Eddie Ainsmith and that players must take an essential job or be drafted.
- July 27 – Appearing in his first and only game in the majors, relief pitcher Harry Heitmann gives up four hits to each of the four batters he faces in Brooklyn's 22–7 loss to the St. Louis Cardinals. Heitmann is pulled from the game and never appears again, making him the only known major league pitcher whose E.R.A. is infinity.

=== August ===
- August 1 – The Pittsburgh Pirates and the Boston Braves went head-to-head for a major-league record twenty scoreless innings. Marathon man Art Nehf went the distance for Boston, but was eventually beaten 2–0 in the twenty-first inning.
- August 9 – Cincinnati Reds manager Christy Mathewson suspended Hal Chase indefinitely after suspecting him of taking bribes to fix games. Chase was eventually reinstated and returned to play for the New York Giants in 1919.
- August 30 – Carl Mays pitched two nine-inning complete game victories on the same day, as the Boston Red Sox bested the Philadelphia Athletics 12–0 and 4–1 at Fenway Park. Mays finished with a 21–13 record, as the season is abbreviated because of World War I. Those wins put the Red Sox one step from clinching the American League championship, as they led the Cleveland Indians by 3½ games with four remaining to play en route to the 1918 World Series title.

=== September ===
- September 1 – During the regular season, Washington Senators ace Walter Johnson completed fifteen extra inning games, including two of eighteen innings, one of sixteen innings, and another of fifteen innings.
- September 2:
  - In the last game of the season, against the Chicago White Sox, Detroit Tigers centerfielder Ty Cobb fields at third base and also pitches, yielding three hits and one run in two innings.
  - The date upon which the regular season ended early following a compromise between Presidents Ban Johnson of the American League and John K. Tener of the National League with Secretary of War Newton Baker and General Enoch Crowder
- September 5 – During the 7th inning stretch in Game 1 of the World Series, a military band played the "Star Spangled Banner" as a tribute to all servicemen on leave and in attendance. From then on, the song was played at every World Series outing and every season opener, though it was not yet adopted as the national anthem. The custom of playing it before every game began during World War II, after the installation of stadium speaker systems made it more feasible.
- September 11 – Against the backdrop of World War I, which forced the premature ending to the regular season on September 2, the Boston Red Sox defeated the Chicago Cubs, 2–1, in Game 6 of the World Series to win their fifth world championship, and third in four years, four games to two. The Red Sox would not win another championship for the next 86 years.

=== October ===
- October 5 – National League infielder Eddie Grant became the first major league player killed in wartime action while leading a mission in the Meuse–Argonne Offensive to rescue the Lost Battalion, which was trapped behind German lines. Other players killed in World War I included Alex Burr, Larry Chappell, Ralph Sharman, and Bun Troy.

== Births ==
=== January ===
- January 5 – Jack Kramer
- January 6 – John Corriden
- January 6 – Bill Zinser
- January 8 – Alma Ziegler
- January 9 – Ferrell Anderson
- January 10 – Bill Lillard
- January 11 – Ernie Andres
- January 11 – Al Gardella
- January 13 – Everett Fagan
- January 13 – Steve Mesner
- January 13 – Emmett O'Neill
- January 23 – Randy Gumpert
- January 23 – Sam Jethroe
- January 23 – Chris Pelekoudas
- January 25 – Ernie Harwell
- January 25 – Ed Head
- January 25 – Steve Roser
- January 29 – Bill Rigney
- January 31 – Sid Peterson

=== February ===
- February 3 – Sid Schacht
- February 3 – Quincy Smith
- February 5 – Cy Buker
- February 6 – Ernie Kish
- February 8 – Cookie Cuccurullo
- February 8 – Butch Nieman
- February 12 – Monk Dubiel
- February 13 – Norm Wallen
- February 14 – Benny Zientara
- February 16 – Creepy Crespi
- February 18 – José Antonio Casanova
- February 22 – Charles O. Finley
- February 22 – Jackie Sullivan
- February 23 – Jim Carlin
- February 23 – Hillis Layne
- February 25 – George Diehl

=== March ===
- March 1 – Hank Wyse
- March 2 – Frank Colman
- March 3 – Bill Hoffman
- March 3 – Forrest Thompson
- March 4 – Mel Queen
- March 9 – Dale Alderson
- March 11 – Lyman Bostock
- March 11 – Ed Fernandes
- March 13 – Eddie Pellagrini
- March 14 – Arnold Carter
- March 16 – Vern Olsen
- March 18 – Ruby Knezovich
- March 18 – Dick Mulligan
- March 21 – Ed Klieman
- March 22 – Bill Butland
- March 22 – Carl Miles
- March 23 – Lou Lucier
- March 31 – Marv Grissom

=== April ===
- April 4 – Carlos Ascanio
- April 7 – Bobby Doerr
- April 8 – Bob Mavis
- April 12 – Chucho Ramos
- April 19 – Whitey Kurowski
- April 19 – Vidal López
- April 21 – Jack Brewer
- April 22 – Marshall Riddle
- April 22 – Mickey Vernon
- April 25 – Tex Shirley
- April 26 – Jack Kraus
- April 27 – John Rice
- April 30 – Louella Daetweiler

=== May ===
- May 2 – Berith Melin
- May 5 – John Leovich
- May 7 – Al Epperly
- May 11 – Dewey Adkins
- May 12 – Ed Runge
- May 13 – Carden Gillenwater
- May 13 – Lonnie Goldstein
- May 14 – Wimpy Quinn
- May 18 – Dewey Adkins
- May 18 – Rufe Gentry
- May 21 – Stan Goletz
- May 21 – Neb Stewart
- May 23 – Frank Mancuso
- May 25 – Johnny Beazley
- May 28 – Bob Malloy
- May 29 – Bill Burich

=== June ===
- June 5 – Al Javery
- June 5 – Dave Odom
- June 12 – Bitsy Mott
- June 17 – Pete Elko
- June 21 – Eddie Lopat
- June 26 – Elmer Singleton

=== July ===
- July 1 – Al Tate
- July 6 – Hal Marnie
- July 10 – Chuck Stevens
- July 18 – Al Lyons
- July 21 – Chet Hajduk
- July 23 – Pee Wee Reese
- July 23 – Walter Sessi
- July 28 – Ross Davis
- July 30 – Jack Conway

=== August ===
- August 4 – Don Kolloway
- August 4 – Frank McElyea
- August 8 – Red Roberts
- August 8 – Marlin Stuart
- August 12 – Charlie Gassaway
- August 13 – Elmer Weingartner
- August 23 – Ken Holcombe
- August 23 – Ed Murphy
- August 23 – Rocky Stone
- August 25 – Paul Busby
- August 28 – Jeff Cross
- August 28 – Ronny Miller
- August 29 – Garland Lawing
- August 29 – Joe Schultz
- August 30 – Billy Johnson
- August 30 – Ted Williams

=== September ===
- September 1 – Joe L. Brown
- September 1 – Jim Mallory
- September 2 – Len Rice
- September 4 – Bill Endicott
- September 4 – George Pfister
- September 9 – Woody Crowson
- September 11 – Randy Heflin
- September 11 – Marjorie Peters
- September 12 – Al Libke
- September 17 – Bob Dillinger
- September 26 – Walt Chipple
- September 30 – Jim Castiglia

=== October ===
- October 1 – Jim Russell
- October 4 – Red Munger
- October 6 – Jimmy Grant
- October 7 – Frank Baumholtz
- October 7 – Irv Hall
- October 11 – Bob Chipman
- October 15 – Austin Knickerbocker
- October 17 – Howie Moss
- October 18 – Fred Vaughn
- October 21 – Ralph McCabe
- October 22 – Fred Caligiuri
- October 22 – Lou Klein
- October 25 – Nanny Fernandez
- October 26 – Snuffy Stirnweiss
- October 27 – Ed Albosta
- October 30 – Tony Ordeñana

=== November ===
- November 1 – Héctor Benítez
- November 1 – Lefty Sloat
- November 3 – Joe Cleary
- November 3 – Bob Feller
- November 5 – Rogelio Martínez
- November 10 – John Henry Moss
- November 21 – Dorothy Maguire
- November 27 – Pat Capri
- November 28 – Russ Meers
- November 30 – Janice O'Hara

=== December ===
- December 1 – Lefty Sloat
- December 3 – Joe Cleary
- December 4 – William Metzig
- December 8 – Sam Zoldak
- December 9 – Clarence Beers
- December 17 – Johanna Hageman
- December 17 – Dale Jones
- December 19 – Bill DeKoning
- December 19 – Tommy O'Brien
- December 22 – Bill Kennedy
- December 31 – Fats Dantonio
- December 31 – Al Lakeman

== Deaths ==
=== January ===
- January 9 – George Ulrich, 48, National League outfielder who played between 1892 and 1896 for the Washington Senators, Cincinnati Reds and New York Giants.
- January 24 – Mike Gaule, 48, outfielder for the 1889 Louisville Colonels of the American Association.

=== February ===
- February 2 – Jack Crooks, 52, second baseman who played with four different teams between 1889 and 1896, and also managed the 1892 St. Louis Browns of the National League.
- February 5 – Carl Druhot, 35, pitcher who played from 1906 to 1907 for the Cincinnati Reds and St. Louis Cardinals.
- February 21 – John Fogarty, 53, outfielder for the 1885 St. Louis Maroons of the National League.

=== March ===
- March 2 – George Kaiserling, 24, pitcher who played from 1914 through 1915 with the Indianapolis Hoosiers and the Newark Pepper of the Federal League.
- March 4 – Lon Ury, 40, first baseman for the 1903 St. Louis Cardinals.
- March 10 – Jim McCormick, 61, pitcher who posted a 265–214 record with a 2.43 ERA for six different teams between 1878 and 1897, who is regarded as the first ballplayer born in Glasgow to appear in a major league game.
- March 22 – Jim Holdsworth, 67, shortstop for seven different teams in a nine season career that spanned between 1870 and 1884.
- March 24 – Jack Farrell, 25, second baseman who played from 1914 to 1915 for the Chicago Whales.

=== April ===
- April 6 – Bill Bowman, 49, catcher for the 1891 Chicago Colts.
- April 6 – Newt Halliday, 21, first baseman for the 1916 Pittsburgh Pirates.
- April 9 – Ed Wilkinson, 27, outfielder and infielder for the 1912 New York Highlanders of the American League.
- April 10 – Owen Shannon, 38, backup catcher for the 1907 Washington Senators of the American League.
- April 25 – Dave Williams, 37, pitcher for the 1902 Boston Americans of the American League.

=== May ===
- May 4 – Maury Uhler, 31, outfielder for the 1914 Cincinnati Reds.
- May 15 – Patsy Tebeau, 53, a 19th-century infielder/manager for the Cleveland and St. Louis National League teams.
- May 24 – Chris McFarland, 56, outfielder for the 1884 Baltimore Monumentals of the Union Association.
- May 24 – Ralph Sharman, 23, outfielder for the 1917 Philadelphia Athletics, who drowned while serving in World War I.
- May 26 – George Bone, 43, shortstop for the 1901 Milwaukee Brewers of the American League.

=== June ===
- June 11 – Mike Hickey, 46, second baseman who appeared in one game for the 1899 Boston Beaneaters of the National League.
- June 12 – Larry Ressler, 69, outfielder who played during the 1875 season for the Washington Nationals of the National Association, who is recognized as the first player born in France to play in American professional baseball.
- June 14 – George Wheeler, 36, pinch hitter who played in three games for the Cincinnati Reds in the 1910 season.
- June 21 – Davy Force, 68, shortstop who posted a .249 average with 1060 hits and 653 runs scored in 1029 games for nine different teams between 1871 and 1886.
- June 25 – Jake Beckley, 50, owner of the major league record for career games as a first baseman, a .308 career hitter who retired with the second most hits in major league history.

=== July ===
- July 21 – Larry Pape, 35, pitcher who posted a 12–9 record and a 2.81 ERA for the Boston Red Sox in part of three seasons between 1909 and 1912 and later pitched for Triple-A Buffalo Bisons in 1913.

=== August ===
- August 3 – Mike Lawlor, 64, catcher for the NL Troy Trojans in 1880 and the UA Washington Nationals in 1884.

=== September ===
- September 10 – Ed Cassian, 50, pitcher for the NL Philadelphia Phillies and the UA Washington Statesmen during the 1891 season.
- September 12 – Ernie Beam, 51, pitcher for the 1895 Philadelphia Phillies.
- September 28 – John Frill, 39, pitcher for the New York Highlanders, St. Louis Browns and Cincinnati Reds between 1910 and 1912.

=== October ===
- October 4 – Phil Routcliffe, 47, Canadian outfielder who played for the 1890 Pittsburgh Alleghenys of the National League.
- October 5 – Eddie Grant, 35, infielder for the Cleveland Naps, Phiildelphia Phillies, Cincinnati Reds and New York Giants between 1905 and 1917, who was killed in action while serving in World War I.
- October 7 – Bun Troy, 30, German-born pitcher for 1912 Detroit Tigers, who was killed in action while serving with the U.S. Army during World War I.
- October 9 – Fred Gaiser, 33, German pitcher who played for the St. Louis Cardinals during the 1908 season.
- October 10 – George LeClair, 31, Canadian pitcher who played from 1914 to 1915 in the Federal League with the Pittsburgh Rebels, Buffalo Blues and Baltimore Terrapins.
- October 12 – Alex Burr, 24, outfielder for the 1914 New York Yankees, who was killed in an airplane accident while serving in World War I.
- October 12 – Harry Glenn, 28, backup catcher for the 1915 St. Louis Cardinals.
- October 18 – Tom Reilly, 34, shortstop in parts of three seasons with the St. Louis Cardinals (1908–1909) and the Cleveland Naps (1914).
- October 21 – Harry Chapman, 30, catcher who played in three different leagues from 1912 to 1916 for the Chicago Cubs, Cincinnati Reds, St. Louis Terriers and St. Louis Browns.
- October 26 – Charlie Rhodes, 33, who pitched for the Cardinals and Reds between 1906 and 1909.
- October 31 – Charlie Hilsey, 54, pitcher and outfielder who played for the NL Philadelphia Quakers (1883) and the AA Philadelphia Athletics (1884).

=== November ===
- November 7 – Mike Tiernan, 51, right fielder who played exclusively for the New York Giants from 1887 through 1899, compiling a .311 average with 106 home runs, 853 RBI, 1316 runs and 428 stolen bases in 1478 games.
- November 8 – Larry Chappell, 28, outfielder for the Chicago White Sox, Cleveland Indians and Boston Braves from 1913 to 1917, who died in an army camp from the Spanish flu pandemic while serving in World War I.

=== December ===
- December 4 – Walt Dickson, 40, who pitched from 1910 through 1915 for the Boston Braves, Pittsburgh Rebels and New York Giants.
- December 8 – Ed Mincher, 67, National Association outfielder who played from 1868 to 1872 for the Baltimore Marylands, Fort Wayne Kekiongas and Washington Nationals.
- December 10 – Lester Dole, 63, outfielder for the 1875 New Haven Elm Citys of the National Association.
- December 13 – Frank Arellanes, 36, Mexican-American pitcher for the Boston Red Sox from 1908 to 1910, who died in San Jose, California, victim of the Spanish flu pandemic.
- December 20 – Silk O'Loughlin, 46, American League umpire since 1902 who worked in a record ten no-hitters and introduced the practice of shouting calls for balls, strikes and outs.
- December 25 – Bob Blakiston, 63, outfielder who played from 1882 to 1884 in the American Association for the Philadelphia Athletics and Indianapolis Hoosiers.
