= 1909 Philadelphia Phillies season =

Major League Baseball season

1909 Philadelphia Phillies
- League: National League
- Ballpark: National League Park
- City: Philadelphia
- Owners: Bill Shettsline
- Managers: Billy Murray

The following lists the events of the 1909 Philadelphia Phillies season.

== Regular season ==
=== Season standings ===
National League
| Team | W | L | Pct. | GB | Home | Road |
|---|---|---|---|---|---|---|
| Pittsburgh Pirates | 110 | 42 | .724 | — | 56‍–‍21 | 54‍–‍21 |
| Chicago Cubs | 104 | 49 | .680 | 6½ | 47‍–‍29 | 57‍–‍20 |
| New York Giants | 92 | 61 | .601 | 18½ | 44‍–‍33 | 48‍–‍28 |
| Cincinnati Reds | 77 | 76 | .503 | 33½ | 39‍–‍38 | 38‍–‍38 |
| Philadelphia Phillies | 74 | 79 | .484 | 36½ | 40‍–‍37 | 34‍–‍42 |
| Brooklyn Superbas | 55 | 98 | .359 | 55½ | 34‍–‍45 | 21‍–‍53 |
| St. Louis Cardinals | 54 | 98 | .355 | 56 | 26‍–‍48 | 28‍–‍50 |
| Boston Doves | 45 | 108 | .294 | 65½ | 27‍–‍47 | 18‍–‍61 |

=== Record vs. opponents ===
1909 National League record Sources:
| Team | BSN | BRO | CHC | CIN | NYG | PHI | PIT | STL |
|---|---|---|---|---|---|---|---|---|
| Boston | — | 11–11 | 1–21 | 5–17 | 8–14–2 | 10–12 | 1–20 | 9–13 |
| Brooklyn | 11–11 | — | 5–16 | 5–17–1 | 7–15 | 11–11 | 4–18 | 12–10–1 |
| Chicago | 21–1 | 16–5 | — | 16–6 | 11–11–1 | 16–6 | 9–13 | 15–7–1 |
| Cincinnati | 17–5 | 17–5–1 | 6–16 | — | 9–13–1 | 9–12–1 | 7–15–1 | 12–10 |
| New York | 14–8–2 | 15–7 | 11–11–1 | 13–9–1 | — | 12–10 | 11–11–1 | 16–5 |
| Philadelphia | 12–10 | 11–11 | 6–16 | 12–9–1 | 10–12 | — | 7–15 | 16–6 |
| Pittsburgh | 20–1 | 18–4 | 13–9 | 15–7–1 | 11–11–1 | 15–7 | — | 18–3 |
| St. Louis | 13–9 | 10–12–1 | 7–15–1 | 10–12 | 5–16 | 6–16 | 3–18 | — |

=== Notable transactions ===
- July 16, 1909: Buster Brown, Lew Richie, and Dave Shean were traded by the Phillies to the Boston Doves for Charlie Starr and Johnny Bates.

=== Roster ===
1909 Philadelphia Phillies
Roster
| Pitchers: Buster Brown; Frank Corridon; Harry Coveleski; Bill Foxen; George McQuillan; Earl Moore; Lew Moren; Lew Richie; Frank Scanlan; Tully Sparks; Ben Van Dyke | Catchers: Red Dooin; Al Froehlich; Fred Jacklitsch; Doc Martel; Ed McDonough; Infielders: Kitty Bransfield; Mickey Doolan; Eddie Grant; Otto Knabe; Dave Shean; Charlie Starr; Joe Ward | Outfielders: Johnny Bates; Wally Clement; Pep Deininger; Sherry Magee; Fred Osborn; John Titus | Manager: Billy Murray |

== Player stats ==
=== Batting ===
==== Starters by position ====
Note: Pos = Position; G = Games played; AB = At bats; H = Hits; Avg. = Batting average; HR = Home runs; RBI = Runs batted in

| Pos | Player | G | AB | H | Avg. | HR | RBI |
|---|---|---|---|---|---|---|---|
| C | Red Dooin | 141 | 468 | 105 | .224 | 2 | 38 |
| 1B | Kitty Bransfield | 140 | 527 | 154 | .292 | 1 | 59 |
| 2B | Otto Knabe | 113 | 402 | 94 | .234 | 0 | 34 |
| SS | Mickey Doolin | 147 | 493 | 108 | .219 | 1 | 35 |
| 3B | Eddie Grant | 154 | 631 | 170 | .269 | 1 | 37 |
| OF | Sherry Magee | 143 | 522 | 141 | .270 | 2 | 66 |
| OF | Johnny Bates | 77 | 266 | 78 | .293 | 1 | 15 |
| OF | John Titus | 151 | 540 | 146 | .270 | 3 | 46 |

==== Other batters ====
Note: G = Games played; AB = At bats; H = Hits; Avg. = Batting average; HR = Home runs; RBI = Runs batted in

| Player | G | AB | H | Avg. | HR | RBI |
|---|---|---|---|---|---|---|
| Fred Osborn | 58 | 189 | 35 | .185 | 0 | 19 |
| Joe Ward | 74 | 184 | 49 | .266 | 0 | 23 |
| Pep Deininger | 55 | 169 | 44 | .260 | 0 | 16 |
| Dave Shean | 36 | 112 | 26 | .232 | 0 | 4 |
| Doc Martell | 24 | 41 | 11 | .268 | 0 | 7 |
| Fred Jacklitsch | 20 | 32 | 10 | .313 | 0 | 1 |
| Wally Clement | 3 | 3 | 0 | .000 | 0 | 0 |
| Charlie Starr | 3 | 3 | 0 | .000 | 0 | 0 |
| Al Froehlich | 1 | 1 | 0 | .000 | 0 | 0 |
| Ed McDonough | 1 | 1 | 0 | .000 | 0 | 0 |

=== Pitching ===
==== Starting pitchers ====
Note: G = Games pitched; IP = Innings pitched; W = Wins; L = Losses; ERA = Earned run average; SO = Strikeouts

| Player | G | IP | W | L | ERA | SO |
|---|---|---|---|---|---|---|
| Earl Moore | 38 | 299.2 | 18 | 12 | 2.10 | 173 |
| Lew Moren | 40 | 257.2 | 16 | 15 | 2.65 | 110 |
| George McQuillan | 41 | 247.2 | 13 | 16 | 2.14 | 96 |
| Frank Corridon | 27 | 171.0 | 7 | 11 | 2.11 | 69 |
| Tully Sparks | 24 | 121.2 | 6 | 11 | 2.96 | 40 |
| Harry Coveleski | 24 | 121.2 | 6 | 10 | 2.74 | 56 |

==== Other pitchers ====
Note: G = Games pitched; IP = Innings pitched; W = Wins; L = Losses; ERA = Earned run average; SO = Strikeouts

| Player | G | IP | W | L | ERA | SO |
|---|---|---|---|---|---|---|
| Bill Foxen | 18 | 83.1 | 3 | 7 | 3.35 | 37 |
| Buster Brown | 7 | 24.0 | 0 | 0 | 3.24 | 10 |

==== Relief pitchers ====
Note: G = Games pitched; W = Wins; L = Losses; SV = Saves; ERA = Earned run average; SO = Strikeouts

| Player | G | W | L | SV | ERA | SO |
|---|---|---|---|---|---|---|
| Lew Richie | 11 | 1 | 1 | 1 | 2.00 | 11 |
| Frank Scanlan | 6 | 0 | 0 | 1 | 1.64 | 5 |
| Ben Van Dyke | 2 | 0 | 0 | 0 | 3.68 | 5 |
