= 1908 Philadelphia Phillies season =

Major League Baseball season

1908 Philadelphia Phillies
- League: National League
- Ballpark: National League Park
- City: Philadelphia, Pennsylvania
- Record: 83–71 (.539)
- League place: 4th
- Owners: Bill Shettsline
- Managers: Billy Murray

The 1908 Philadelphia Phillies season was a season in Major League Baseball. The Phillies finished fourth in the National League with a record of 83 wins and 71 losses.

== Preseason ==
The Phillies' 1908 spring training was held in Savannah, Georgia. The team stayed at the Hotel DeSoto and practiced and played exhibition games at Bolton Street Park.

In March 1908, entertainer George "Honey Boy" Evans spent two weeks with the Phillies at spring training, where he stayed and practiced with the team and socialized with the players. The Phillies named its team of younger players the "Honey Boys" in intrasquad games against the regulars in honor of Evans.

=== 1908 Philadelphia City Series ===
The Phillies played four games against the Philadelphia Athletics for the local championship in the pre-season city series. The Athletics defeated the Phillies 3 games to 1.

AL Philadelphia Athletics (3) vs. NL Philadelphia Phillies (1)

Game	Date	Score	Location	Time	Attendance
1	April 3, 1908	No Game - Cold	Philadelphia Ball Park	-	-
2	April 4, 1908	No Game - Cold	Columbia Park	-	-
3	April 6, 1908	Philadelphia Athletics – 5, Philadelphia Phillies – 0	Philadelphia Ball Park	1:45	9,108
4	April 7, 1908	Philadelphia Phillies – 6, Philadelphia Athletics – 7	Columbia Park	1:47	-
5	April 8, 1908	No Game - Rain	Philadelphia Ball Park	-	-
6	April 9, 1908	Philadelphia Phillies – 2, Philadelphia Athletics – 0	Columbia Park	1:42	5,246
7	April 10, 1908	No Game - Rain	Philadelphia Ball Park	-	-
8	April 11, 1908	Philadelphia Athletics – 5, Philadelphia Phillies – 0	Philadelphia Ball Park	1:45	10,953

The Phillies record against the A's was 20–21 all time after the 1908 series.

== Regular season ==
On June 9, 1908, Philadelphia native Patsy O'Rourke returned to the city as a member of the St Louis Cardinals to play the Phillies at National League Park. It was reported that a large contingent of fans from O'Rourke's Port Richmond neighborhood came out to the game, cheered every time O'Rourke touched the ball, and when he came to bat in the second inning, presented him with a watch which included an acknowledgement from the local Commodore Barry amateur baseball team with whom he had played in 1907.

=== Season standings ===
National League
Team	W	L	Pct.	GB	Home	Road
Chicago Cubs	99	55	.643	—	47‍–‍30	52‍–‍25
New York Giants	98	56	.636	1	52‍–‍25	46‍–‍31
Pittsburgh Pirates	98	56	.636	1	42‍–‍35	56‍–‍21
Philadelphia Phillies	83	71	.539	16	43‍–‍34	40‍–‍37
Cincinnati Reds	73	81	.474	26	40‍–‍37	33‍–‍44
Boston Doves	63	91	.409	36	35‍–‍42	28‍–‍49
Brooklyn Superbas	53	101	.344	46	27‍–‍50	26‍–‍51
St. Louis Cardinals	49	105	.318	50	28‍–‍49	21‍–‍56

=== Record vs. opponents ===
1908 National League record Sources:
Team	BSN	BRO	CHC	CIN	NYG	PHI	PIT	STL
Boston	—	12–10	6–16–2	8–14	6–16	10–12	7–15	14–8
Brooklyn	10–12	—	4–18	6–16	6–16	5–17	9–13	13–9
Chicago	16–6–2	18–4	—	16–6	11–11–1	9–13–1	10–12	19–3
Cincinnati	14–8	16–6	6–16	—	8–14–1	10–12	8–14	11–11
New York	16–6	16–6	11–11–1	14–8–1	—	16–6	11–11–1	14–8
Philadelphia	12–10	17–5	13–9–1	12–10	6–16	—	9–13	14–8
Pittsburgh	15–7	13–9	12–10	14–8	11–11–1	13–9	—	20–2
St. Louis	8–14	9–13	3–19	11–11	8–14	8–14	2–20	—

=== Roster ===
1908 Philadelphia Phillies
Roster
Pitchers: Buster Brown; Frank Corridon; Harry Coveleski; Bill Foxen; Harry Hoch; George McQuillan; Earl Moore; Lew Moren; Lew Richie; Tully Sparks	Catchers: Red Dooin; Fred Jacklitsch; Infielders: Kitty Bransfield; Ernie Courtney; Mickey Doolan; Kid Gleason; Eddie Grant; Otto Knabe; Dave Shean	Outfielders: Wally Clement; Pep Deininger; Charlie Johnson; Sherry Magee; Moose McCormick; Fred Osborn; Roy Thomas; John Titus	Manager: Billy Murray

== Player stats ==
=== Batting ===
==== Starters by position ====
Note: Pos = Position; G = Games played; AB = At bats; H = Hits; Avg. = Batting average; HR = Home runs; RBI = Runs batted in

Pos	Player	G	AB	H	Avg.	HR	RBI
C	Red Dooin	133	435	108	.248	0	41
1B	Kitty Bransfield	144	527	160	.304	3	71
2B	Otto Knabe	151	555	121	.218	0	27
SS	Mickey Doolin	129	445	104	.234	2	49
3B	Eddie Grant	147	598	146	.244	0	32
OF	Fred Osborn	152	555	148	.267	2	44
OF	Sherry Magee	143	508	144	.283	2	57
OF	John Titus	149	539	154	.286	2	48

==== Other batters ====
Note: G = Games played; AB = At bats; H = Hits; Avg. = Batting average; HR = Home runs; RBI = Runs batted in

Player	G	AB	H	Avg.	HR	RBI
Ernie Courtney	60	160	29	.181	0	6
Fred Jacklitsch	37	86	19	.221	0	7
Dave Shean	14	48	7	.146	0	2
Wally Clement	16	36	8	.222	0	1
Roy Thomas	6	24	4	.167	0	0
Moose McCormick	11	22	2	.091	0	2
Charlie Johnson	6	16	4	.250	0	2
Kid Gleason	2	1	0	.000	0	0
Pep Deininger	1	0	0	----	0	0

=== Pitching ===
==== Starting pitchers ====
Note: G = Games pitched; IP = Innings pitched; W = Wins; L = Losses; ERA = Earned run average; SO = Strikeouts

Player	G	IP	W	L	ERA	SO
George McQuillan	48	359.2	23	17	1.53	114
Tully Sparks	33	263.1	16	15	2.60	85
Frank Corridon	27	208.1	14	10	2.51	50
Bill Foxen	22	147.1	7	7	1.95	52
Harry Coveleski	6	43.2	4	1	1.24	22
Harry Hoch	3	26.0	2	1	2.77	4
Earl Moore	3	26.0	2	1	0.00	16

==== Other pitchers ====
Note: G = Games pitched; IP = Innings pitched; W = Wins; L = Losses; ERA = Earned run average; SO = Strikeouts

Player	G	IP	W	L	ERA	SO
Lew Richie	25	157.2	7	10	1.83	58
Lew Moren	28	154.0	8	9	2.92	72

==== Relief pitchers ====
Note: G = Games pitched; W = Wins; L = Losses; SV = Saves; ERA = Earned run average; SO = Strikeouts

Player	G	W	L	SV	ERA	SO
Buster Brown	3	0	0	0	2.57	3
