= 1907 Philadelphia Phillies season =

Major League Baseball season

1907 Philadelphia Phillies
- League: National League
- Ballpark: National League Park
- City: Philadelphia, Pennsylvania
- Record: 83–64 (.565)
- League place: 3rd
- Owners: Bill Shettsline
- Managers: Billy Murray

The following lists the events of the 1907 Philadelphia Phillies season.

== Preseason ==
The Phillies' 1907 spring training was held in Savannah, Georgia where the team practiced and played exhibition games at Bolton Street Park. It was the fourth successive year the Phillies trained in Savannah.

The Phillies named their team of younger players the "Minstrels" in intrasquad games against the regulars in tribute to the contemporaneous anti-Black Minstrel show, popular at the time among the Phillies’ players.

=== 1907 Philadelphia City Series ===
The Phillies played four of six scheduled games against the Philadelphia Athletics for the local championship in the pre-season city series. The Phillies defeated the Athletics 4 games to 0.

AL Philadelphia Athletics (0) vs. NL Philadelphia Phillies (4)

Game	Date	Score	Location	Time	Attendance
1	April 3, 1907	Philadelphia Phillies – 1, Philadelphia Athletics – 0	Columbia Park	1:15	-
2	April 4, 1907	Philadelphia Athletics – 1, Philadelphia Phillies – 4	Philadelphia Ball Park	1:43	5,278
3	April 5, 1907	Philadelphia Phillies – 1, Philadelphia Athletics – 0	Columbia Park	1:40	3,172
4	April 6, 1907	Philadelphia Athletics – 5, Philadelphia Phillies – 9	Philadelphia Ball Park	1:45	5,145
5	April 8, 1907	No Game - Wet Grounds	Columbia Park	-	-
6	April 9, 1907	No Game - Rain	Philadelphia Ball Park	-	-

The Phillies sweep moved the team to 19–18 against the A's all-time in the city series.

== Regular season ==
=== Season standings ===
National League
Team	W	L	Pct.	GB	Home	Road
Chicago Cubs	107	45	.704	—	54‍–‍19	53‍–‍26
Pittsburgh Pirates	91	63	.591	17	47‍–‍29	44‍–‍34
Philadelphia Phillies	83	64	.565	21½	45‍–‍30	38‍–‍34
New York Giants	82	71	.536	25½	45‍–‍30	37‍–‍41
Brooklyn Superbas	65	83	.439	40	37‍–‍38	28‍–‍45
Cincinnati Reds	66	87	.431	41½	43‍–‍36	23‍–‍51
Boston Doves	58	90	.392	47	31‍–‍42	27‍–‍48
St. Louis Cardinals	52	101	.340	55½	31‍–‍47	21‍–‍54

=== Record vs. opponents ===
1907 National League record Sources:
Team	BSN	BRO	CHC	CIN	NYG	PHI	PIT	STL
Boston	—	12–7–2	5–17	9–13	9–13	8–11–1	9–13–1	6–16
Brooklyn	7–12–2	—	5–15–1	15–7–1	10–12–1	8–13	6–16	14–8
Chicago	17–5	15–5–1	—	17–5	16–6	14–8	12–10–1	16–6–1
Cincinnati	13–9	7–15–1	5–17	—	9–13–1	8–13	10–12–1	14–8
New York	13–9	12–10–1	6–16	13–9–1	—	11–10	10–12	17–5
Philadelphia	11–8–1	13–8	8–14	13–8	10–11	—	14–8	14–7–1
Pittsburgh	13–9–1	16–6	10–12–1	12–10–1	12–10	8–14	—	20–2
St. Louis	16–6	8–14	6–16–1	8–14	5–17	7–14–1	2–20	—

=== Roster ===
1907 Philadelphia Phillies
Roster
Pitchers: Buster Brown; Frank Corridon; Harry Coveleski; Bill Duggleby; Johnny Lush; John McCloskey; George McQuillan; Lew Moren; Togie Pittinger; Lew Richie; Tully Sparks	Catchers: Red Dooin; Fred Jacklitsch; Infielders: Kitty Bransfield; Ernie Courtney; Mickey Doolan; Kid Gleason; Eddie Grant; Otto Knabe; Paul Sentell	Outfielders: Sherry Magee; Fred Osborn; Roy Thomas; John Titus	Manager: Billy Murray

== Player stats ==
=== Batting ===
==== Starters by position ====
Note: Pos = Position; G = Games played; AB = At bats; H = Hits; Avg. = Batting average; HR = Home runs; RBI = Runs batted in

Pos	Player	G	AB	H	Avg.	HR	RBI
C	Red Dooin	101	313	66	.211	0	14
1B	Kitty Bransfield	94	348	81	.233	0	38
2B	Otto Knabe	129	444	113	.255	1	34
SS	Mickey Doolin	145	509	104	.204	1	47
3B	Eddie Grant	74	268	65	.243	0	19
OF	Roy Thomas	121	419	102	.243	1	23
OF	Sherry Magee	140	503	165	.328	4	85
OF	John Titus	145	523	144	.275	3	63

==== Other batters ====
Note: G = Games played; AB = At bats; H = Hits; Avg. = Batting average; HR = Home runs; RBI = Runs batted in

Player	G	AB	H	Avg.	HR	RBI
Ernie Courtney	130	440	107	.243	2	43
Fred Jacklitsch	73	202	43	.213	0	17
Fred Osborn	56	163	45	.276	0	9
Kid Gleason	36	126	18	.143	0	6
Paul Sentell	4	3	0	.000	0	0

=== Pitching ===
==== Starting pitchers ====
Note: G = Games pitched; IP = Innings pitched; W = Wins; L = Losses; ERA = Earned run average; SO = Strikeouts

Player	G	IP	W	L	ERA	SO
Frank Corridon	37	274.0	18	14	2.46	131
Tully Sparks	33	265.0	22	8	2.00	90
Lew Moren	37	255.0	11	18	2.54	98
Buster Brown	21	130.0	9	6	2.42	38
Togie Pittinger	16	102.0	9	5	3.00	37
Johnny Lush	8	57.1	3	5	2.98	20
George McQuillan	6	41.0	4	0	0.66	28

==== Other pitchers ====
Note: G = Games pitched; IP = Innings pitched; W = Wins; L = Losses; ERA = Earned run average; SO = Strikeouts

Player	G	IP	W	L	ERA	SO
Lew Richie	25	117.0	6	6	1.77	40
Bill Duggleby	5	29.0	0	2	7.45	8

==== Relief pitchers ====
Note: G = Games pitched; W = Wins; L = Losses; SV = Saves; ERA = Earned run average; SO = Strikeouts

Player	G	W	L	SV	ERA	SO
Harry Coveleski	4	1	0	0	0.00	6
John McCloskey	3	0	0	0	7.00	3
