= 1906 Philadelphia Phillies season =

Major League Baseball season

1906 Philadelphia Phillies
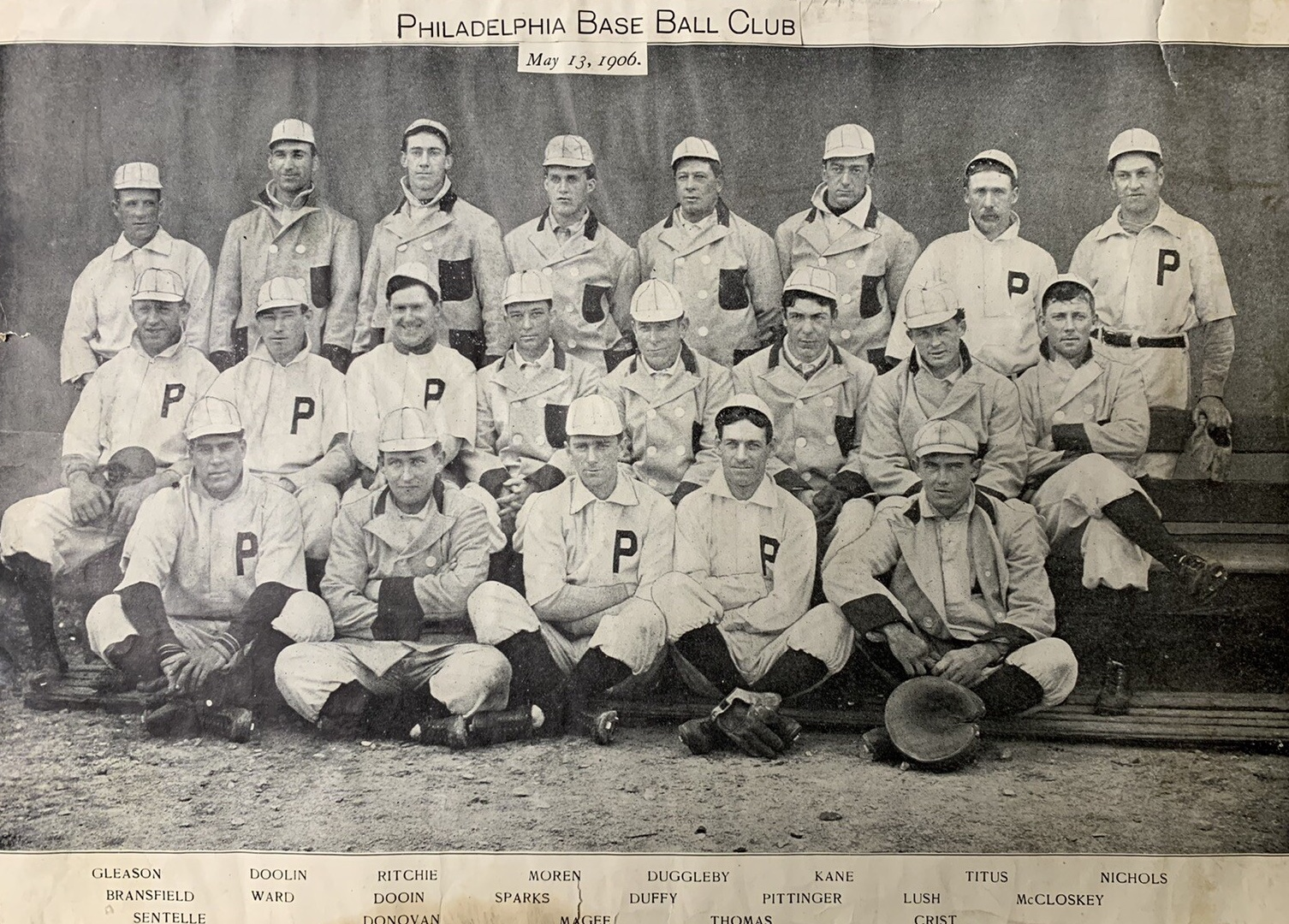
- 1906 Philadelphia Phillies
- League: National League
- Ballpark: National League Park
- City: Philadelphia, Pennsylvania
- Owners: Bill Shettsline
- Managers: Hugh Duffy

In the 1906 Major League Baseball season, the Philadelphia Phillies finished fourth in the National League with a record of 71 wins and 82 losses.

== Preseason ==
The Phillies conducted their spring training in 1906 in Savannah, Georgia where the team practiced and played exhibition games at Bolton Street Park. It was the third successive year the Phillies trained in Savannah.

=== 1906 Philadelphia City Series ===
The Phillies played five of nine scheduled games against the Philadelphia Athletics for the local championship in the pre-season city series. The Athletics defeated the Phillies, 4 games to 1.

AL Philadelphia Athletics (4) vs. NL Philadelphia Phillies (1)

Game	Date	Score	Location	Time	Attendance
1	March 31, 1906	No Game - Rain	Philadelphia Ball Park	-	-
2	April 2, 1906	Philadelphia Athletics – 1, Philadelphia Athletics – 7	Columbia Park	2:00	5,000
3	April 3, 1906	Philadelphia Athletics – 3, Philadelphia Phillies – 0	Philadelphia Ball Park	1:45	4,508
4	April 4, 1906	Philadelphia Phillies – 0, Philadelphia Athletics – 1	Columbia Park	-	4,024
5	April 5, 1906	Philadelphia Athletics – 1, Philadelphia Phillies – 4	Philadelphia Ball Park	1:35	4,175
6	April 6, 1906	No Game - Cold	Columbia Park	-	-
7	April 7, 1906	Philadelphia Phillies – 2, Philadelphia Athletics – 7	Columbia Park	1:45	8,211
8	April 9, 1906	No Game - Rain	Philadelphia Ball Park	-	-
9	April 10, 1906	No Game - Wet Grounds	Philadelphia Ball Park	-	-

The Phillies moved to 15-18 against the A's after the 1906 series.

== Regular season ==
On May 1, 1906, Phillies pitcher Johnny Lush pitched a no-hitter against Brooklyn at Washington Park. The Phillies won 6–0; Lush struck out 11 batters, walked three, and one batter reached first on a Doolin error.

=== Season standings ===
National League
Team	W	L	Pct.	GB	Home	Road
Chicago Cubs	116	36	.763	—	56‍–‍21	60‍–‍15
New York Giants	96	56	.632	20	51‍–‍24	45‍–‍32
Pittsburgh Pirates	93	60	.608	23½	49‍–‍27	44‍–‍33
Philadelphia Phillies	71	82	.464	45½	37‍–‍40	34‍–‍42
Brooklyn Superbas	66	86	.434	50	31‍–‍44	35‍–‍42
Cincinnati Reds	64	87	.424	51½	36‍–‍40	28‍–‍47
St. Louis Cardinals	52	98	.347	63	28‍–‍48	24‍–‍50
Boston Beaneaters	49	102	.325	66½	28‍–‍47	21‍–‍55

=== Record vs. opponents ===
1906 National League record Sources:
Team	BSN	BRO	CHC	CIN	NYG	PHI	PIT	STL
Boston	—	9–13	5–17	11–10–1	6–15	6–16	3–19	9–12
Brooklyn	13–9	—	6–16	8–14	9–13	8–13	9–13	13–8–1
Chicago	17–5	16–6	—	18–4	15–7–1	19–3–1	16–5	15–6–1
Cincinnati	10–11–1	14–8	4–18	—	5–16	11–11	8–14–1	12–9–2
New York	15–6	13–9	7–15–1	16–5	—	15–7	11–11	19–3
Philadelphia	16–6	13–8	3–19–1	11–11	7–15	—	8–14	13–9
Pittsburgh	19–3	13–9	5–16	14–8–1	11–11	14–8	—	17–5
St. Louis	12–9	8–13–1	6–15–1	9–12–2	3–19	9–13	5–17	—

=== Roster ===
1906 Philadelphia Phillies
Roster
Pitchers: Bill Duggleby; Harry Kane; Johnny Lush; John McCloskey; Walter Moser; Kid Nichols; Togie Pittinger; Lew Richie; Charlie Roy; Tully Sparks	Catchers: Ches Crist; Jerry Donovan; Red Dooin; Harry Huston; Infielders: Kitty Bransfield; Ernie Courtney; Mickey Doolan; Kid Gleason; Paul Sentell; Joe Ward	Outfielders: Hugh Duffy; Sherry Magee; Roy Thomas; John Titus	Manager: Hugh Duffy

== Player stats ==
=== Batting ===
==== Starters by position ====
Note: Pos = Position; G = Games played; AB = At bats; H = Hits; Avg. = Batting average; HR = Home runs; RBI = Runs batted in

Pos	Player	G	AB	H	Avg.	HR	RBI
C	Red Dooin	113	351	86	.245	0	32
1B	Kitty Bransfield	140	524	144	.275	1	60
2B	Kid Gleason	135	494	112	.227	0	34
SS	Mickey Doolin	154	535	123	.230	1	55
3B	Ernie Courtney	116	398	94	.236	0	42
OF	Roy Thomas	142	493	125	.254	0	16
OF	Sherry Magee	154	563	159	.282	6	67
OF	John Titus	145	484	129	.267	1	57

==== Other batters ====
Note: G = Games played; AB = At bats; H = Hits; Avg. = Batting average; HR = Home runs; RBI = Runs batted in

Player	G	AB	H	Avg.	HR	RBI
Paul Sentell	63	192	44	.229	1	14
Jerry Donovan	61	166	33	.199	0	15
Joe Ward	35	129	38	.295	0	11
Ches Crist	6	11	0	.000	0	0
Harry Huston	2	4	0	.000	0	0
Hugh Duffy	1	1	0	.000	0	0

=== Pitching ===
==== Starting pitchers ====
Note: G = Games pitched; IP = Innings pitched; W = Wins; L = Losses; ERA = Earned run average; SO = Strikeouts

Player	G	IP	W	L	ERA	SO
Tully Sparks	42	316.2	19	16	2.16	114
Johnny Lush	37	281.0	18	13	2.37	151
Bill Duggleby	42	280.1	13	19	2.25	83
Lew Richie	33	205.2	9	11	2.41	65
Togie Pittinger	20	129.2	8	10	3.40	43

==== Other pitchers ====
Note: G = Games pitched; IP = Innings pitched; W = Wins; L = Losses; ERA = Earned run average; SO = Strikeouts

Player	G	IP	W	L	ERA	SO
John McCloskey	9	41.0	3	2	2.85	6
Walter Moser	6	42.2	0	4	3.59	17
Harry Kane	6	28.0	1	3	3.86	14
Charlie Roy	7	18.1	0	1	4.91	6
Kid Nichols	4	11.0	0	1	9.82	1
