= List of Philadelphia Phillies seasons =

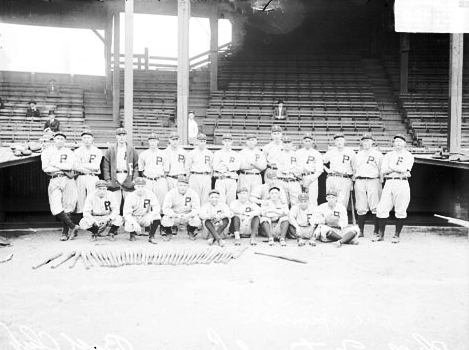
The 1915 Phillies were the first in franchise history to win the National League pennant.

This is a list of seasons completed by the Philadelphia Phillies, originally known as the Philadelphia Quakers, a professional baseball franchise based in Philadelphia, Pennsylvania.

The Philadelphia Phillies have completed 131 seasons in Major League Baseball since their inception in 1883.

As of the conclusion of the 2023 season, the Phillies have played in 21,486 regular season games, with a record of 10,112-11,259 (.471). They also have a combined record of 68-65 (.511) in post-season play. This list documents the season-by-season records of the Phillies’ franchise including their year as the “Quakers” and the years where they shared the names “Quakers” and “Phillies.” The team was formed in the National League after the dissolution of the Worcester baseball franchise at the end of 1882, though there is no additional connection between the teams.

At times, the Phillies’ search for success has been seen as an exercise in futility, because of their long stretches of losing seasons, including sixteen consecutive from 1933 through 1948. However, the Phillies do own eight National League pennants, won in 1915, 1950, 1980, 1983, 1993, 2008, 2009, and 2022, as well as championships in the 1980 and 2008 World Series. Compared to the team's early days, the Phillies have recently been more successful than not, with two periods of extended success: the first from 1975 to 1983, when they won five East Division championships as well as the first-half championship in the strike-shortened 1981 season, and the second starting in 2001, with a winning percentage of .540 over those nine seasons, finishing above .500 in all but one, and making the playoffs from 2007 to 2011.

During their record-setting streak of sixteen consecutive losing seasons, the Phillies posted their franchise record for losses in a season in 1941 with 111, falling shy of the modern (post-dead-ball era) Major League record of 120 losses in a season. During the 2007 season, the franchise also became the first professional sports team in American history to reach 10,000 losses. The Phillies have thrice surpassed the century mark for wins in a season: in 1976 with 101 wins, when they made their first playoff appearance in twenty-six seasons; again the next season when they matched that mark; and in 2011, when they set the franchise single-season record for wins with 102 victories and clinched a playoff position at the earliest point in team history. Philadelphia finished the 2010 season with a record of 97–65, marking the first time that the team completed a season with Major League Baseball's best record; they duplicated this accomplishment in 2011 as the majors' only 100-win team. Since 2011, the Phillies have declined again and in 2015 they suffered the worst record in MLB and the franchise's worst since an equally-poor record in 1969, with their worst before then from 1961. However, their fortunes have turned once again since the arrival of Bryce Harper in 2019, culminating in a pennant win in 2022.

== Year by year ==
World Series champions (1903–present) †	National League champions (1883–present) *	Division champions (1969–present) ^	Wild card berth (1994–present) ¤

MLB season	Team season	League	Division	Finish^{[a]}	Wins^{[b]}	Losses	Win%	GB^{[c]}	Postseason	Awards	Manager
Philadelphia Quakers
1883	1883	NL		8th	17	81	.173	46			Bob Ferguson Until May 28; Blondie Purcell Starting May 28
1884	1884	NL		6th	39	73	.348	45			Harry Wright
1885	1885	NL		3rd	56	54	.509	30			Harry Wright
1886	1886	NL		4th	71	43	.623	14			Harry Wright
1887	1887^{[m]}	NL		2nd	75	48	.610	3 1/2			Harry Wright
1888	1888	NL		3rd	69	61	.531	14 1/2			Harry Wright
1889	1889	NL		4th	63	64	.496	20 1/2			Harry Wright
Philadelphia Phillies
1890	1890	NL		3rd	78	54	.591	9 1/2			Harry Wright; Jack Clements; Al Reach; Bob Allen
1891	1891	NL		4th	68	69	.496	18 1/2			Harry Wright
1892	1892	NL		4th	87	66	.569	16 1/2			Harry Wright
1893	1893	NL		4th	72	57	.558	14			Harry Wright
1894	1894	NL		4th	71	57	.555	18			Arthur Irwin
1895	1895	NL		3rd	78	53	.595	9 1/2			Arthur Irwin
1896	1896	NL		8th	62	68	.477	28 1/2			Billy Nash
1897	1897	NL		10th	55	77	.417	38			George Stallings
1898	1898	NL		6th	78	71	.523	24			George Stallings Until June 19; Bill Shettsline Starting June 19
1899	1899	NL		3rd	94	58	.618	9			Bill Shettsline
1900	1900	NL		3rd	75	63	.543	8			Bill Shettsline
1901	1901	NL		2nd	83	57	.593	7 1/2			Bill Shettsline
1902	1902	NL		7th	56	81	.409	46			Bill Shettsline
1903	1903	NL		7th	49	86	.363	39 1/2			Chief Zimmer
1904	1904	NL		8th	52	100	.342	53 1/2			Hugh Duffy
1905	1905	NL		4th	83	69	.546	21 1/2			Hugh Duffy
1906	1906	NL		4th	71	82	.464	45 1/2			Hugh Duffy
1907	1907	NL		3rd	83	64	.565	21 1/2			Billy Murray
1908	1908	NL		4th	83	71	.539	16			Billy Murray
1909	1909	NL		5th	74	79	.484	36 1/2			Billy Murray
1910	1910	NL		4th	78	75	.510	25 1/2			Red Dooin
1911	1911	NL		4th	79	73	.520	19 1/2			Red Dooin
1912	1912	NL		5th	73	79	.480	30 1/2			Red Dooin
1913	1913	NL		2nd	88	63	.583	12 1/2			Red Dooin
1914	1914	NL		6th	74	80	.481	20 1/2			Red Dooin
1915	1915	NL *		1st	90	62	.592	—	Lost World Series (Red Sox) 4–1 *		Pat Moran
1916	1916	NL		2nd	91	62	.595	2 1/2			Pat Moran
1917	1917	NL		2nd	87	65	.572	10			Pat Moran
1918	1918	NL		6th	55	68	.447	26			Pat Moran
1919	1919	NL		8th	47	90	.343	47 1/2			Jack Coombs Until July 7 Gavvy Cravath Starting July 7
1920	1920	NL		8th	62	91	.405	30 1/2			Gavvy Cravath
1921	1921	NL		8th	51	103	.331	43 1/2			Bill Donovan Until August 9 Kaiser Wilhelm Starting August 9
1922	1922	NL		7th	57	96	.373	35 1/2			Kaiser Wilhelm
1923	1923	NL		8th	50	104	.325	45 1/2			Art Fletcher
1924	1924	NL		7th	55	96	.364	37			Art Fletcher
1925	1925	NL		6th	68	85	.444	27			Art Fletcher
1926	1926	NL		8th	58	93	.384	29 1/2			Art Fletcher
1927	1927	NL		8th	51	103	.331	43			Stuffy McInnis
1928	1928	NL		8th	43	109	.283	51			Burt Shotton
1929	1929	NL		5th	71	82	.464	27 1/2			Burt Shotton
1930	1930	NL		8th	52	102	.338	40			Burt Shotton
1931	1931	NL		6th	66	88	.429	35			Burt Shotton
1932	1932	NL		4th	78	76	.506	12		Chuck Klein (MVP)^{[h]}	Burt Shotton
1933	1933	NL		7th	60	92	.395	31		Chuck Klein (NL Triple Crown)	Burt Shotton
1934	1934	NL		7th	56	93	.376	37			Jimmie Wilson
1935	1935	NL		7th	64	89	.418	35 1/2			Jimmie Wilson
1936	1936	NL		8th	54	100	.351	38			Jimmie Wilson
1937	1937^{[n]}	NL		7th	61	92	.399	34 1/2			Jimmie Wilson
1938	1938^{[o]}	NL		8th	45	105	.300	43			Jimmie Wilson
1939	1939	NL		8th	45	106	.298	50 1/2			Doc Prothro
1940	1940	NL		8th	50	103	.327	50			Doc Prothro
1941	1941	NL		8th	43	111	.279	57			Doc Prothro
1942	1942	NL		8th	42	109	.278	62 1/2			Hans Lobert
1943	1943	NL		7th	64	90	.416	41			Bucky Harris Until July 27; Freddie Fitzsimmons Starting July 27
1944	1944	NL		8th	61	92	.399	43 1/2			Freddie Fitzsimmons
1945	1945	NL		8th	46	108	.299	52			Freddie Fitzsimmons Until June 30; Ben Chapman Starting June 30
1946	1946	NL		5th	69	85	.448	28			Ben Chapman
1947	1947	NL		7th	62	92	.403	32			Ben Chapman
1948	1948	NL		6th	66	88	.429	25 1/2			Ben Chapman; Dusty Cooke; Eddie Sawyer
1949	1949	NL		3rd	81	73	.526	16			Eddie Sawyer
1950	1950	NL *		1st	91	63	.591	—	Lost World Series (Yankees) 4–0 *	Jim Konstanty (MVP); Eddie Sawyer (MOY)^{[g]}	Eddie Sawyer
1951	1951	NL		5th	73	81	.474	23 1/2			Eddie Sawyer
1952	1952	NL		4th	87	67	.565	9 1/2			Eddie Sawyer Until June 27; Steve O'Neill Starting June 27
1953	1953	NL		3rd	83	71	.539	22			Steve O'Neill
1954	1954	NL		4th	75	79	.487	22			Steve O'Neill Until July 15; Terry Moore Starting July 15
1955	1955	NL		4th	77	77	.500	21 1/2			Mayo Smith
1956	1956	NL		5th	71	83	.461	22			Mayo Smith
1957	1957	NL		5th	77	77	.500	18		Jack Sanford (ROY)^{[i]}	Mayo Smith
1958	1958	NL		8th	69	85	.448	23			Mayo Smith Until July 22; Eddie Sawyer Starting July 22
1959	1959	NL		8th	64	90	.416	23			Eddie Sawyer
1960	1960	NL		8th	59	95	.383	36			Eddie Sawyer; Andy Cohen; Gene Mauch
1961	1961	NL		8th	47	107	.305	46			Gene Mauch
1962	1962	NL		7th	81	80	.503	20		Gene Mauch (MOY)	Gene Mauch
1963	1963	NL		4th	87	75	.537	12			Gene Mauch
1964	1964	NL		2nd	92	70	.568	1		Dick Allen (ROY); Gene Mauch (MOY)	Gene Mauch
1965	1965	NL		6th	85	76	.528	11 1/2			Gene Mauch
1966	1966	NL		4th	87	75	.537	8			Gene Mauch
1967	1967	NL		5th	82	80	.506	19 1/2			Gene Mauch
1968	1968	NL		7th	76	86	.469	21			Gene Mauch Until June 16; Bob Skinner Starting June 16
1969	1969	NL	East	5th	63	99	.389	37			Bob Skinner Until August 6 George Myatt Starting August 6
1970	1970^{[p]}	NL	East	5th	73	88	.453	15 1/2			Frank Lucchesi
1971	1971^{[q]}	NL	East	6th	67	95	.414	30			Frank Lucchesi
1972	1972	NL	East	6th	59	97	.378	37 1/2		Steve Carlton (CYA)^{[f]}	Frank Lucchesi Until July 10; Paul Owens Starting July 10
1973	1973	NL	East	6th	71	91	.438	11 1/2			Danny Ozark
1974	1974	NL	East	3rd	80	82	.494	8			Danny Ozark
1975	1975	NL	East	2nd	86	76	.531	6 1/2			Danny Ozark
1976	1976	NL	East ^	1st	101	61	.623	—	Lost NLCS^{[e]} (Reds) 3–0	Danny Ozark (MOY)	Danny Ozark
1977	1977	NL	East ^	1st	101	61	.623	—	Lost NLCS (Dodgers) 3–1	Steve Carlton (CYA)	Danny Ozark
1978	1978	NL	East ^	1st	90	72	.556	—	Lost NLCS (Dodgers) 3–1		Danny Ozark
1979	1979	NL	East	4th	84	78	.519	14			Danny Ozark Until August 31; Dallas Green Starting August 31
1980 †	1980	NL *	East ^	1st	91	71	.562	—	Won NLCS (Astros) 3–2; Won World Series (Royals) 4–2 †	Mike Schmidt (MVP, WSMVP)^{[aa]} Steve Carlton (CYA)	Dallas Green
1981	1981	NL	East	1st ^	34	21	.618	—	Lost NLDS^{[d]} (Expos) 3–2	Mike Schmidt (MVP)	Dallas Green
1981	1981	NL	East	3rd	25	27	.481	4 1/2	Lost NLDS^{[d]} (Expos) 3–2	Mike Schmidt (MVP)	Dallas Green
1982	1982	NL	East	2nd	89	73	.549	3		Steve Carlton (CYA)	Pat Corrales
1983	1983	NL *	East ^	1st	90	72	.556	—	Won NLCS (Dodgers) 3–1; Lost World Series (Orioles) 4–1 *	John Denny (CYA)	Pat Corrales Until July 17; Paul Owens Starting July 17
1984	1984	NL	East	4th	81	81	.500	15 1/2			Paul Owens
1985	1985	NL	East	5th	75	87	.463	26			John Felske
1986	1986	NL	East	2nd	86	75	.534	21 1/2		Mike Schmidt (MVP)	John Felske
1987	1987	NL	East	4th	80	82	.494	15		Steve Bedrosian (CYA)	John Felske Until June 17; Lee Elia Starting June 17
1988	1988	NL	East	6th	65	96	.404	35 1/2			Lee Elia Until September 23; John Vukovich Starting September 23
1989	1989	NL	East	6th	67	95	.414	26			Nick Leyva
1990	1990	NL	East	4th	77	85	.475	18			Nick Leyva
1991	1991	NL	East	3rd	78	84	.481	20			Nick Leyva Until April 23; Jim Fregosi Starting April 23
1992	1992	NL	East	6th	70	92	.432	26			Jim Fregosi
1993	1993	NL *	East ^	1st	97	65	.599	—	Won NLCS (Braves) 4–2; Lost World Series (Blue Jays) 4–2 *		Jim Fregosi
1994	1994	NL	East	4th	54	61	.470	20 1/2			Jim Fregosi
1995	1995	NL	East	3rd	69	75	.479	21			Jim Fregosi
1996	1996	NL	East	5th	67	95	.414	29			Jim Fregosi
1997	1997	NL	East	5th	68	94	.420	33		Scott Rolen (ROY)	Terry Francona
1998	1998	NL	East	3rd	75	87	.463	31			Terry Francona
1999	1999	NL	East	3rd	77	85	.475	26			Terry Francona
2000	2000	NL	East	5th	65	97	.401	30			Terry Francona
2001	2001	NL	East	2nd	86	76	.531	2		Larry Bowa (MOY)	Larry Bowa
2002	2002	NL	East	3rd	80	81	.497	21 1/2			Larry Bowa
2003	2003^{[r]}	NL	East	3rd	86	76	.531	15			Larry Bowa
2004	2004^{[s]}	NL	East	2nd	86	76	.531	10			Larry Bowa Until October 1 Gary Varsho Starting October 1
2005	2005	NL	East	2nd	88	74	.543	2		Ryan Howard (ROY)	Charlie Manuel
2006	2006	NL	East	2nd	85	77	.525	12		Ryan Howard (MVP)	Charlie Manuel
2007	2007	NL	East ^	1st	89	73	.549	—	Lost NLDS (Rockies) 3–0	Jimmy Rollins (MVP)	Charlie Manuel
2008 †	2008	NL *	East ^	1st	92	70	.568	—	Won NLDS (Brewers) 3–1; Won NLCS (Dodgers) 4–1; Won World Series (Rays) 4–1 †	Cole Hamels (WSMVP)^{[aa]}	Charlie Manuel
2009	2009	NL *	East ^	1st	93	69	.574	—	Won NLDS (Rockies) 3–1; Won NLCS (Dodgers) 4–1; Lost World Series (Yankees) 4–2 *		Charlie Manuel
2010	2010	NL	East ^	1st	97	65	.599	—	Won NLDS (Reds) 3–0; Lost NLCS (Giants) 4–2	Roy Halladay (CYA)	Charlie Manuel
2011	2011	NL	East ^	1st	102	60	.630	—	Lost NLDS (Cardinals) 3–2		Charlie Manuel
2012	2012	NL	East	3rd	81	81	.500	17			Charlie Manuel
2013	2013	NL	East	4th	73	89	.451	23			Charlie Manuel Until August 16; Ryne Sandberg Starting August 16
2014	2014	NL	East	5th	73	89	.451	23			Ryne Sandberg
2015	2015	NL	East	5th	63	99	.389	27			Ryne Sandberg Until June 26; Pete Mackanin Starting June 26
2016	2016	NL	East	4th	71	91	.438	24			Pete Mackanin
2017	2017	NL	East	5th	66	96	.407	31			Pete Mackanin
2018	2018	NL	East	3rd	80	82	.494	10			Gabe Kapler
2019	2019	NL	East	4th	81	81	.500	16			Gabe Kapler
2020	2020	NL	East	3rd	28	32	.467	7			Joe Girardi
2021	2021	NL	East	2nd	82	80	.506	6 1/2		Bryce Harper (MVP)	Joe Girardi
2022	2022	NL *	East	3rd ¤	87	75	.537	14	Won NLWC (Cardinals) 2–0; Won NLDS (Braves) 3–1; Won NLCS (Padres) 4–1; Lost World Series (Astros) 4–2 *		Joe Girardi Until June 3 Rob Thomson Starting June 3
2023	2023	NL	East	2nd ¤	90	72	.556	14	Won NLWC (Marlins) 2–0; Won NLDS (Braves) 3–1; Lost NLCS (Diamondbacks) 4–3		Rob Thomson
2024	2024	NL	East ^	1st	95	67	.586	—	Lost NLDS (Mets) 3–1		Rob Thomson
2025	2025	NL	East ^	1st	96	66	.593	—	Lost NLDS (Dodgers) 3–1		Rob Thomson
2026	2026	NL	East	2nd ¤	88	74	.543	6	Lost NLWC (Braves) 2–1		Rob Thomson Until April 28; Don Mattingly Starting April 28
Totals					Wins	Losses	Win%				
Totals					390	424	.479	Philadelphia Quakers all-time regular season record (1883–1889)			
Totals					10,001	11,042	.475	Phillies all-time regular season record (1890–2022)			
Totals					71	73	.493	All-time postseason record			
Totals					10,462	11,539	.476	All-time regular and postseason record			

== Record by decade ==
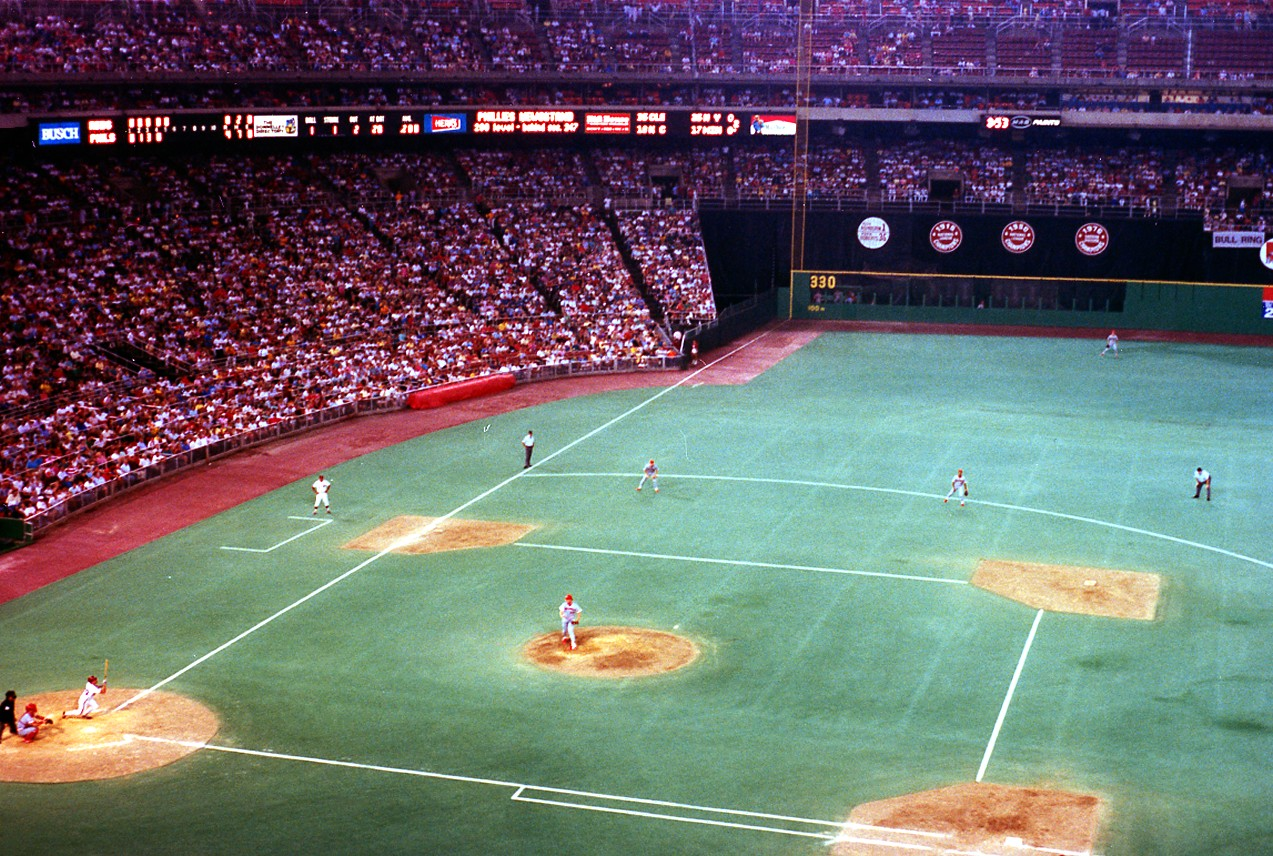
Mike Schmidt hits a home run at Veterans Stadium in 1987.

The following table describes the Phillies' MLB win–loss record by decade.

Decade	Wins	Losses	Ties	Pct
1880s	468	477	20	0.495
1890s	740	639	21	0.536
1900s	712	764	20	0.483
1910s	746	733	16	0.504
1920s	556	973	8	0.364
1930s	579	944	8	0.381
1940s	625	911	11	0.408
1950s	735	805	5	0.477
1960s	773	836	2	0.480
1970s	812	801	0	0.503
1980s	783	780	0	0.501
1990s	720	835	0	0.463
2000s	882	737	0	0.525
2010s	718	800	0	0.473
2020s	478	392	0	0.549
All-time	10,327	11,427	111	.475

These statistics are from Baseball-Reference.com's Philadelphia Phillies History & Encyclopedia, and are current as of October 2023.

== Postseason record by year ==
The Phillies have made the postseason nineteen times in their history, with their first being in 1915 and the most recent being in 2026.

Year	Finish	Round	Opponent	Result		
1915	National League Champions	World Series	Boston Red Sox	Lost	1	4
1950	National League Champions	World Series	New York Yankees	Lost	0	4
1976	National League East Champions	NLCS	Cincinnati Reds	Lost	0	3
1977	National League East Champions	NLCS	Los Angeles Dodgers	Lost	1	3
1978	National League East Champions	NLCS	Los Angeles Dodgers	Lost	1	3
1980	World Series Champions	NLCS	Houston Astros	Won	3	2
1980	World Series Champions	World Series	Kansas City Royals	Won	4	2
1981	National League East Champions (first half)	NLDS	Montreal Expos	Lost	2	3
1983	National League Champions	NLCS	Los Angeles Dodgers	Won	3	1
1983	National League Champions	World Series	Baltimore Orioles	Lost	1	4
1993	National League Champions	NLCS	Atlanta Braves	Won	4	2
1993	National League Champions	World Series	Toronto Blue Jays	Lost	2	4
2007	National League East Champions	NLDS	Colorado Rockies	Lost	0	3
2008	World Series Champions	NLDS	Milwaukee Brewers	Won	3	1
2008	World Series Champions	NLCS	Los Angeles Dodgers	Won	4	1
2008	World Series Champions	World Series	Tampa Bay Rays	Won	4	1
2009	National League Champions	NLDS	Colorado Rockies	Won	3	1
2009	National League Champions	NLCS	Los Angeles Dodgers	Won	4	1
2009	National League Champions	World Series	New York Yankees	Lost	2	4
2010	National League East Champions	NLDS	Cincinnati Reds	Won	3	0
2010	National League East Champions	NLCS	San Francisco Giants	Lost	2	4
2011	National League East Champions	NLDS	St. Louis Cardinals	Lost	2	3
2022	National League Champions	NLWC	St. Louis Cardinals	Won	2	0
2022	National League Champions	NLDS	Atlanta Braves	Won	3	1
2022	National League Champions	NLCS	San Diego Padres	Won	4	1
2022	National League Champions	World Series	Houston Astros	Lost	2	4
2023	National League Wild Card	NLWC	Miami Marlins	Won	2	0
2023	National League Wild Card	NLDS	Atlanta Braves	Won	3	1
2023	National League Wild Card	NLCS	Arizona Diamondbacks	Lost	3	4
2024	National League East Champions	NLDS	New York Mets	Lost	1	3
2025	National League East Champions	NLDS	Los Angeles Dodgers	Lost	1	3
2026	National League Wild Card	NLWC	Atlanta Braves	Lost	1	2
19	Totals			15–17	71	73
