= John McCloskey (disambiguation) =

John McCloskey (1810–1885) was an American Roman Catholic clergyman and first American Cardinal.

John McCloskey may also refer to:

- John McCloskey (baseball manager) (1862–1940), American baseball manager
- John McCloskey (pitcher) (1882–1919), American baseball pitcher
- C. John McCloskey, Catholic priest
- Jack McCloskey (1925–2017), American basketball player, coach and executive

== See also ==
- H. J. McCloskey (Henry John McCloskey, 1925–2000), Australian moral philosopher
