= Mal Eason =

American baseball player and umpire (1879–1970)

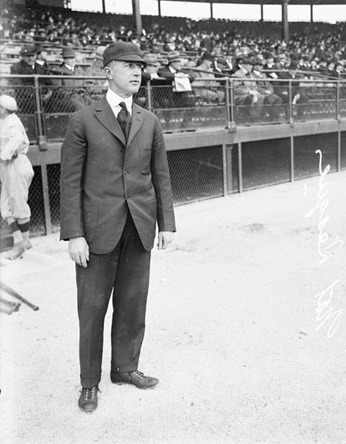
- Eason as a National League umpire in 1916.
- Pitcher
- Born: March 13, 1879; Brookville, Pennsylvania, U.S.
- Died: April 16, 1970 (aged 91); Douglas, Arizona, U.S.
- Batted: Right Threw: Right

MLB debut
- October 1, 1900, for the Chicago Orphans

Last MLB appearance
- October 4, 1906, for the Brooklyn Superbas

MLB statistics
- Win–loss record: 36–73
- Earned run average: 3.39
- Strikeouts: 273
- Stats at Baseball Reference

Teams
- Chicago Orphans (1900–1902); Boston Beaneaters (1902); Detroit Tigers (1903); Brooklyn Superbas (1905–1906)

Career highlights and awards
- Pitched a no-hitter on July 20, 1906

Malcolm Wayne Eason (March 13, 1879 – April 16, 1970) was an American starting pitcher in Major League Baseball who played for the Chicago Orphans (1900–1902), Boston Beaneaters (1902), Detroit Tigers (1903) and Brooklyn Superbas (1905–1906). Eason batted and threw right-handed. He was born in Brookville, Pennsylvania.

== Playing career ==
In 1901 and 1902, Eason finished with marks of 8–17 and 10–12, while pitching for second-division teams. Despite these losing records, he registered 3.59 and 2.61 ERAs respectively. His most productive season came in 1906, when he posted a 10–17 mark with a 3.25 ERA. It was Eason's last season as an active player. That July 20, Eason no-hit the St. Louis Cardinals 2–0. Earlier in the season, he had been the losing pitcher in the previous no-hitter to this one, by the Philadelphia Phillies' Johnny Lush on May 1. Not until Bill McCahan in 1947 would another pitcher hurl a no-hitter after being on the losing end of the last no-hitter before the one he posted.

In a six-season career, Eason posted a 36–73 record with 274 strikeouts and a 3.42 ERA in 951 1/3 innings pitched. He completed 90 of 114 starts, including ten shutouts.

== Umpiring career ==
Eason is recorded as having umpired three games in 1902. After his retirement as a player, he worked as a National League umpire from 1910 to 1917.

== Death ==
Eason died in a house fire in Douglas, Arizona, at the age of 91.

== See also ==
- List of Major League Baseball no-hitters

Preceded by Johnny Lush	No-hitter pitcher July 20, 1906	Succeeded by Big Jeff Pfeffer
