= Al Froehlich =

American baseball player (1887-1916)

- Catcher
- Born: January 2, 1885; Brooklyn
- Died: March 15, 1941 (aged 56); Brooklyn
- Batted: Right Threw: Right

MLB debut
- July 2, 1909, for the Philadelphia Phillies

Last MLB appearance
- July 2, 1909, for the Philadelphia Phillies

MLB statistics
- Games played: 1
- At bats: 1
- Hits: 0
- Stats at Baseball Reference

Teams
- Philadelphia Phillies (1909)

Albert George Froehlich (January 2, 1885 – September 1, 1916) was an American Major League Baseball catcher. Froehlich played in one game for the Philadelphia Phillies in 1909, taking over for Red Dooin, after he was ejected from the game. Al Froelich was long misidentified as Ben Froelich until 2014.
