= Charlie Johnson (baseball) =

American baseball player (1885-1940)

- Outfielder
- Born: March 12, 1885; Slatington, Pennsylvania, U.S.
- Died: August 28, 1940 (aged 55); Marcus Hook, Pennsylvania, U.S.
- Batted: Left Threw: Left

MLB debut
- September 21, 1908, for the Philadelphia Phillies

Last MLB appearance
- October 7, 1908, for the Philadelphia Phillies

MLB statistics
- Batting average: .250
- RBI: 2
- Runs scored: 2
- Stats at Baseball Reference

Teams
- Philadelphia Phillies (1908)

Charles Cleveland Johnson (March 12, 1885 – August 28, 1940) was an American center fielder in Major League Baseball who played for the Philadelphia Phillies in 1908.
