= Bill Finneran =

American baseball umpire (1878-1961)

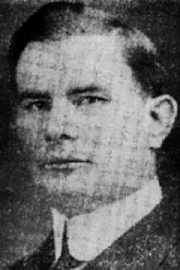
- Born: January 12, 1878; Erie, Pennsylvania, U.S.
- Died: July 3, 1961 (aged 83); Erie, Pennsylvania, U.S.
- Occupation: Umpire (baseball)

William Finneran (January 12, 1878 – July 3, 1961) was an American umpire in Major League Baseball in 1911 and 1912. He also umpired in the Federal League, a "third major league", in 1915 and spent several seasons in various levels of professional umpiring. He is best known for an on-field incident in which he was knocked unconscious by a punch from player Sherry Magee.

== Early life ==
Finneran was born in Erie, Pennsylvania, where he attended public schools before going to work at the age of 14. He was a first baseman in semi-professional baseball before becoming an umpire.

== Umpiring career ==
Finneran's umpiring career began in amateur baseball in his home of Erie in 1904. By 1905, he was umpiring professionally with the Erie Independent club. He spent the 1906 season in the Interstate League and the Eastern League. He was signed to umpire in the Tri-State League for the 1907 and 1908 seasons. By 1909, he had returned to the Eastern League, which was newly promoted to Class AA.

Finneran joined the staff of the National League in 1911, but had moved to the Class AA International League by 1913, where he remained in 1914. He umpired in the Federal League in 1915. He then spent several seasons umpiring minor league baseball in the Northwestern League and the American Association.

== Magee incident ==
On July 10, 1911, Finneran called a third strike on Philadelphia's Sherry Magee. Magee responded angrily, striking Finneran with one punch that left the umpire momentarily unconscious and bleeding. Magee was initially suspended for the remainder of the season. However, he was allowed to return to the field on August 16 following an appeal.

Media coverage at the time described Magee as a "nervous, irritable player" and refers to an incident in which Magee had jumped from a second story window after being overcome by extreme heat. The same coverage also indicates that Finneran "has never been regarded as a competent umpire" despite early prospects. Finneran was said to have been "somewhat of a 'scrapper'" and may have been warned by his partner against making threats toward players.

== Death ==
Finneran died in Erie, Pennsylvania on July 3, 1961.
