= Harry Hoch =

American baseball player (1887–1981)

- Pitcher
- Born: January 9, 1887; Woodside, Delaware, U.S.
- Died: October 26, 1981 (aged 94); Lewes, Delaware, U.S.
- Batted: Right Threw: Right

MLB debut
- April 16, 1908, for the Philadelphia Phillies

Last MLB appearance
- June 24, 1915, for the St. Louis Browns

MLB statistics
- Win–loss record: 2–7
- Earned run average: 4.35
- Strikeouts: 26
- Stats at Baseball Reference

Teams
- Philadelphia Phillies (1908); St. Louis Browns (1914–1915)

Harry Keller Hoch (January 9, 1887 – October 26, 1981) was an American professional baseball player and lawyer. From Woodside, Delaware, he attended Keystone State Normal School (now known as Kutztown University), where he was a top pitcher for the baseball team and led them to a record of 10–1 in 1905. After graduating from college at the age of 18, Hoch became superintendent of schools in Camden, Delaware, the youngest person in the state to hold the position. He later started a professional baseball career to help him earn money to attend Dickinson Law School. He pitched in Major League Baseball (MLB) for the Philadelphia Phillies in 1908, compiling a record of 2–1, and later for the St. Louis Browns in 1914 and 1915, where he went 0–6. After his baseball career, he practiced law in Delaware until 1962.

== Early life ==
Harry Keller Hoch was born on January 9, 1887, in Woodside, Delaware. The son of C. M. Hoch, a mercantile businessman who moved to Delaware from Pennsylvania, he was one of six brothers who played baseball growing up. Also a top student, he was eventually one of 12 selected from Kent County for a program allowing him to attend a teacher's school out of state. Hoch attended Keystone State Normal School (now known as Kutztown University) in Kutztown, Pennsylvania, where he was a top pitcher for the baseball team. In four years there, he helped lead the team to winning records each season. Hoch was a member of a 10–1 Keystone State team in 1905, having one game with 15 strikeouts against Albright while also pitching in a 11–10 victory against Carlisle Indian School. He graduated from Keystone State in 1905 with honors. After his graduation, he returned to Delaware to become superintendent of schools in Camden, becoming the youngest person in the state to serve in the position.

== Professional baseball career ==
Hoch began his professional baseball career with the Kane Mountaineers of the Interstate League in 1906, winning 10 straight games and the league pennant. He then was part of a team in Bridgeville, Delaware, that won a state title, before joining the Wilmington Peaches of the Tri-State League in 1907. With the Peaches, he was viewed as the top pitcher in the league and attracted the interest of many Major League Baseball (MLB) teams. Hoch started 36 games with the Peaches, compiling a win–loss record of 12–18, and was purchased by the Philadelphia Phillies at the end of the season. He made the Phillies for the 1908 season and won his first two games, including pitching a complete game against the Boston Doves. He lost his third game to Boston by a score of 5–3 and was then released. The Evening Journal reported that it "was a surprise as he pitched several good games for the Phillies ... It is said, however, that Murray had too many good pitchers and that he believed that Hoch should have another year's experience in the Tri-State." In his stint with the Phillies, he had a record of 2–1 with a 2.77 earned run average (ERA).

In the Delaware Lawyer magazine, Chuck Durante noted that "Hoch encountered two difficulties with Phillies management: money and religion." Hoch recalled that "The Wilmington club paid me $300 a month in 1907, then sold me to the Phils. The Phils wanted to cut my salary. I told them if I couldn't get at least what I did in the Tri-State League, then send me back. I finally signed for the same $1,500." Hoch also said he was told by one of the team's catchers that he was released in order to allow for more Catholic pitchers to be on the team. Hoch was a Methodist and one of only two Protestants on the Phillies, a team owned by Irish Catholics. Based on his beliefs, Hoch, "for most of his career ... did not play on Sundays," according to Durante.

After his release by the Phillies, Hoch returned to Wilmington before later moving to the Harrisburg Senators. In addition to pitching, he was also sometimes used as a pinch hitter. Hoch compiled a record of 14–16 with Harrisburg in 1909 before leaving for the Elmira Colonels of the New York State League in 1910, where he went 17–9 in his first year and 16–9 in his second. While with Elmira, he once defeated Hall of Fame pitcher Grover Cleveland Alexander. Hoch played with the Binghamton Bingoes in 1913 before joining the St. Louis Browns of the American League (AL) for the 1914 season. He appeared in 15 games with the Browns, although the Harrisburg Telegraph noted that he "seldom got a chance ... save in finishing games". He posted a win–loss record of 0–2 and had an ERA of 3.00. Hoch returned to the Browns in 1915 but posted a record of 0–4 in 12 games with an ERA of 7.20. He also spent time that year with the Louisville Colonels of the American Association, posting a record of 5–6. Hoch retired following the 1915 season. He concluded his MLB career with a record of 2–7 and an ERA of 4.35, with 26 strikeouts.

Hoch played professional baseball to earn money allowing him to attend Dickinson Law School. He attended the law school in the offseasons and was nicknamed "Schoolmaster" for this.

== Later life ==
In 1915, Hoch began working as a clerk in the office of Daniel O. Hastings, a future U.S. Senator. In 1920, he began practicing privately at his home, close to Odessa, Delaware. Hoch became an assistant solicitor in 1922 and was named a Wilmington city solicitor in 1931, serving for two years. In 1941, he was appointed by Governor Walter W. Bacon as New Castle County recorder of deeds, a position he held for 18 months. Durante noted that, "In an era where versatility was the rule among lawyers, Hoch was a polymath, handling cases in criminal defense, admiralty, domestic relations, landlord-tenant, insolvency, construction, probate controversy and commercial litigation." Among his clients was inventor Alfred Lawson. Hoch worked at the firm Morris James Hitchens and Williams the last six years of his career before retiring in 1962. In 1974, Hoch, then the oldest living former Phillies player, threw out the first pitch at one of the team's games. He and his wife, Arrelee, had two sons. Hoch died in Lewes on October 26, 1981, at the age of 94. In 2005, he was posthumously inducted into Kutztown's Athletics Hall of Fame. In 2026, he was selected for induction to the Delaware Sports Museum and Hall of Fame.
