= Frank Scanlan (baseball) =

American baseball player (1890-1969)

- Pitcher
- Born: April 28, 1890; Syracuse, New York, U.S.
- Died: April 9, 1969 (aged 78); Brooklyn, New York, U.S.
- Batted: Left Threw: Left

MLB debut
- August 6, 1909, for the Philadelphia Phillies

Last MLB appearance
- September 1, 1909, for the Philadelphia Phillies

MLB statistics
- Win–loss record: 0–0
- Earned run average: 1.64
- Strikeouts: 5
- Stats at Baseball Reference

Teams
- Philadelphia Phillies (1909)

Frank Aloysius Scanlan (April 28, 1890 – April 9, 1969) was an American Major League Baseball pitcher who played in 1909 with the Philadelphia Phillies. He batted and threw left-handed. Scanlan had a 0–0 record, with a 1.64 ERA, in six games, in his one-year career. He was born in Syracuse, New York and died in Brooklyn, New York.
