= Paul Sentell =

American baseball player (1879-1923)

- Infielder
- Born: August 27, 1879; New Orleans, Louisiana, U.S.
- Died: April 27, 1923 (aged 43); Cincinnati, Ohio, U.S.
- Batted: Right Threw: Right

MLB debut
- April 12, 1906, for the Philadelphia Phillies

Last MLB appearance
- April 27, 1907, for the Philadelphia Phillies

MLB statistics
- Batting average: .226
- Home runs: 1
- Runs batted in: 14
- Stats at Baseball Reference

Teams
- Philadelphia Phillies (1906–1907)

Leopold Theodore "Paul" Sentell (August 27, 1879 – April 27, 1923) was an American professional baseball player, manager, and umpire. He played two seasons in Major League Baseball for the Philadelphia Phillies. Sentell was 5 feet, 9 inches tall and weighed 176 pounds.

== Career ==
Sentell was born in New Orleans, Louisiana, in 1879. He started his professional baseball career in 1903 in the Cotton States League. The following season, he moved to the South Atlantic League and had a batting average of .263. In 1905, Sentell batted a career-high .315, stole 50 bases, and scored 71 runs to help the Macon Brigands win the league championship. His 137 hits that season led the South Atlantic League and were just three more than the second-place finisher, Ty Cobb, who would go on to have a Hall of Fame career in the majors.

Sentell made his MLB debut in 1906 with the Philadelphia Phillies. He appeared in 63 games that year, mostly at third base and second base, and hit .229. In early 1907, he played three games for Philadelphia but spent most of the season with the Eastern League's Jersey City Skeeters. From 1908 to 1913, Sentell played in the Southern Association for the Mobile Sea Gulls, Atlanta Crackers, and Chattanooga Lookouts. He then became a player-manager for the Galveston Pirates of the Texas League and stayed with the team for four seasons.

After his playing career ended in 1918, Sentell worked as an umpire in the Texas League for several years until the National League hired him for the 1922 and 1923 seasons. Sentell was umpiring a game in early 1923 when he collapsed on the field. He died of appendicitis a few days later.
