= Johnny Lush =

American baseball player (1885–1946)

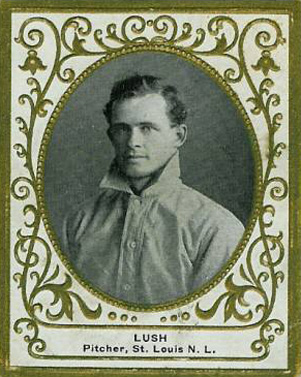
- Pitcher / Right fielder / First baseman
- Born: October 8, 1885; Williamsport, Pennsylvania, U.S.
- Died: November 18, 1946 (aged 61); Beverly Hills, California, U.S.
- Batted: Left Threw: Left

MLB debut
- April 16, 1904, for the Philadelphia Phillies

Last MLB appearance
- October 13, 1910, for the St. Louis Cardinals

MLB statistics
- Win–loss record: 66-85
- Earned run average: 2.68
- Batting average: .254
- Stats at Baseball Reference

Teams
- Philadelphia Phillies (1904–1907); St. Louis Cardinals (1907–1910)

Career highlights and awards
- Pitched a no-hitter on May 1, 1906

John Charles Lush (October 8, 1885 – November 18, 1946) was an American professional baseball pitcher, right fielder and first baseman in the Major Leagues from 1904 to 1910. He played for the St. Louis Cardinals and Philadelphia Phillies.

On May 1, 1906, while with the Phillies, the 20-year-old Lush no-hit the Brooklyn Superbas 6-0 at Brooklyn's Washington Park, besting Mal Eason—himself a no-hit pitcher on July 20 of that season. As of the 2025 MLB season, Lush is the youngest pitcher to throw a no-hitter (he was 20 years and 205 days old at the time). Lush struck out 11, walked three, and one runner reached first base on a Mickey Doolin error. Not until Jim Bunning's perfect game in 1964 would there be another no-hitter by a Phillies pitcher.

Lush was a good hitting pitcher in his seven-year major league career. He posted a .254 batting average (252-for-993) with 107 runs, 40 doubles, 11 triples, 2 home runs, 94 runs batted in, 28 stolen basess and drawing 69 bases on balls. He was also used at first base and in the outfield.

== See also ==
- List of Major League Baseball no-hitters

Preceded by Bill Dinneen	No-hitter pitcher May 1, 1906	Succeeded by Mal Eason
