= Doc Martell =

American baseball player (1883–1947)

Doc Martel
- Catcher
- Born: June 29, 1883; Boston, Massachusetts, US
- Died: October 11, 1947 (aged 64); Washington, D.C., US
- Batted: Right Threw: Right

MLB debut
- July 6, 1909, for the Philadelphia Phillies

Last MLB appearance
- June 18, 1910, for the Boston Doves

MLB statistics
- Batting average: .208
- Home runs: 0
- Runs batted in: 8
- Stats at Baseball Reference

Teams
- Philadelphia Phillies (1909); Boston Doves (1910)

Leon Alphonsus Martel (June 29, 1883 – October 11, 1947) was an American catcher and first baseman in Major League Baseball. Nicknamed "Marty", he played for the Philadelphia Phillies and Boston Doves.

Leon served in the U.S. Army as a captain in the medical corps, and was married to Elsie Hartwell Martel.
