= Third baseman =

Baseball position

The position of the third baseman

A third baseman, abbreviated 3B, is the player in baseball or softball whose responsibility is to defend the area nearest to third base — the third of four bases a baserunner must touch in succession to score a run. In the scoring system used to record defensive plays, the third baseman is assigned the number 5.

Third base is known as the "hot corner", because the third baseman is often the infielder who stands closest to the batter—roughly 90–120 ft (27–37 m) away, but even closer if a bunt is expected. Most right-handed hitters tend to hit the ball hard in this direction. A third baseman must possess good hand-eye coordination and quick reactions to catch batted balls whose speed can exceed 120 miles per hour (190 km/h).

The third base position requires a strong and accurate arm, as the third baseman often makes long throws to first base or quick ones to second base to start a double play. As with middle infielders, right-handed throwing players are standard at the position because they do not need to turn their body before throwing across the infield to first base. Mike Squires, who played fourteen games at third base in 1982 and 1983, is a very rare example of a third baseman who threw lefty. Some third basemen have been converted from middle infielders or outfielders because the position does not require them to run as fast.

The third baseman must also field fly balls in fair and foul territories.

Expectations of how well a third baseman should be able to hit have risen over time; in the early years of the sport, these expectations were similar to those for shortstops, the third baseman being merely the less skilled defensive player. Players who could hit with more ability often were not suited for third base, either because they were left-handed or because they were not mobile enough for the position. However, the beginning of the live-ball era in the 1920s created a greater demand for more offense, and third basemen have since been expected to hit either for a high average (.290 or better) or with moderate to substantial power. Since the 1950s the position has become more of a power position with sluggers such as Eddie Mathews, Mike Schmidt and Ron Santo becoming stars.

There are fewer third basemen in the Baseball Hall of Fame than there are Hall of Famers of any other position. Few third basemen have gone on to have successful managing careers; exceptions include John McGraw, Bobby Cox, Jimmy Dykes, and Negro leaguer Dave Malarcher.

== Prominent third basemen ==
=== Baseball Hall of Fame members ===
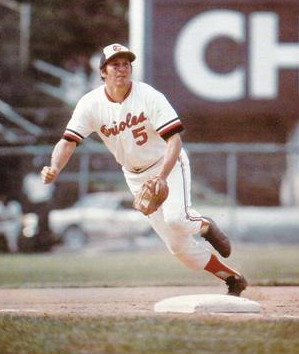
Brooks Robinson played more games at third base than any other player in MLB history.

- Dick Allen (played first base for most of latter part of career)
- Frank "Home Run" Baker
- Adrián Beltré
- Johnny Bench (elected as a catcher, shifted to third base in last three years of his career)
- Wade Boggs
- George Brett (played first base and designated hitter in the latter years of his career)
- Jimmy Collins
- Ray Dandridge (Negro leagues)
- Judy Johnson (Negro leagues)
- Chipper Jones
- George Kell
- Freddie Lindstrom
- Edgar Martínez (primarily a designated hitter who was the regular third baseman for the Seattle Mariners in the early years of his career)
- Eddie Mathews
- John McGraw (primarily elected as a manager, although a third baseman in his short but successful playing career)
- Paul Molitor (longtime designated hitter who played primarily third base on the field)
- Brooks Robinson
- Scott Rolen
- Ron Santo
- Mike Schmidt
- Joe Torre (inducted as manager but played a significant portion of his successful playing career at third base)
- Pie Traynor (First third baseman to be inducted into the Baseball Hall of Fame)
- Jud Wilson (Negro leagues)
- Deacon White (played significantly at catcher, but more games at third, especially as he got older)

=== Multiple Gold Glove Award winners ===
- Brooks Robinson: 16
- Mike Schmidt: 10
- Nolan Arenado: 10 (active)
- Scott Rolen: 8
- Eric Chavez: 6
- Robin Ventura: 6
- Buddy Bell: 6
- Matt Chapman: 5 (active)
- Ken Boyer: 5
- Doug Rader: 5
- Ron Santo: 5
- Gary Gaetti: 4
- Adrián Beltré: 4
- Matt Williams: 4
- Ken Caminiti: 3
- Frank Malzone: 3
- Evan Longoria: 3
- David Wright: 2
- Wade Boggs: 2
- Graig Nettles: 2
- Manny Machado: 2 (active)

=== All-time single-season assists leaders among third basemen ===
1. Graig Nettles: 412 (Cleveland Indians, 1971)
2. Graig Nettles: 410 (New York Yankees, 1973)
3. Brooks Robinson: 410 (Baltimore Orioles, 1974)
4. Brooks Robinson: 405 (Baltimore Orioles, 1967)
5. Harlond Clift: 405 (St. Louis Browns, 1937)
6. Mike Schmidt: 404 (Philadelphia Phillies, 1974)
7. Doug DeCinces: 399 (California Angels, 1982)
8. Brandon Inge: 398 (Detroit Tigers, 2006)
9. Clete Boyer: 396 (New York Yankees, 1962)
10. Mike Schmidt: 396 (Philadelphia Phillies, 1977)
11. Buddy Bell: 396 (Texas Rangers, 1982)

=== All-time single-season putouts leaders among third basemen ===
1. Denny Lyons: 255 (Philadelphia Athletics, 1887)
2. Jimmy Williams: 251 (Pittsburgh Pirates, 1899)
3. Jimmy Collins: 251 (Boston Beaneaters [National League], 1900)
4. Jimmy Collins: 243 (Boston Beaneaters [National League], 1898)
5. Willie Kamm: 243 (Chicago White Sox, 1928)
6. Willie Kamm: 236 (Chicago White Sox, 1927)
7. Frank Baker: 233 (Philadelphia Athletics, 1913)
8. Bill Coughlin: 232 (Washington Senators, 1901)
9. Ernie Courtney: 229 (Philadelphia Phillies, 1905)
10. Jimmy Austin: 228 (St. Louis Browns, 1911)
