= Joe Ward (baseball) =

American baseball player (1884-1934)

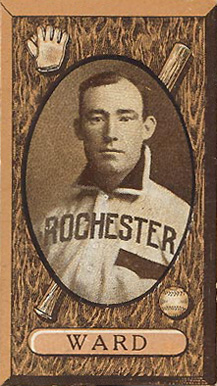
- Infielder
- Born: September 2, 1884; Philadelphia, Pennsylvania, U.S.
- Died: August 11, 1934 (aged 49); Philadelphia, Pennsylvania, U.S.
- Batted: Unknown Threw: Right

MLB debut
- April 24, 1906, for the Philadelphia Phillies

Last MLB appearance
- July 7, 1910, for the Philadelphia Phillies

MLB statistics
- Batting average: .237
- Home runs: 0
- Runs batted in: 47
- Stats at Baseball Reference

Teams
- Philadelphia Phillies (1906); New York Highlanders (1909); Philadelphia Phillies (1909–1910)

Joseph Aloysius Ward (September 2, 1884 – August 11, 1934) was an American Major League Baseball player who played second base for the Philadelphia Phillies in the 1906 season. He also played for the Phillies in 1909–1910 seasons and also part of 1909 with the New York Highlanders. In 166 games, Ward had 110 hits in 465 at-bats, for a .237 batting average. He batted and threw right-handed. He was born in Philadelphia, Pennsylvania. Ward died at a hospital in Philadelphia on August 11, 1934 from injuries suffered in an automobile accident that occurred on August 7.
