= Togie Pittinger =

American baseball player (1872–1909)

- Pitcher
- Born: January 12, 1872; Greencastle, Pennsylvania, U.S.
- Died: January 14, 1909 (aged 37); Greencastle, Pennsylvania, U.S.
- Batted: Left Threw: Right

MLB debut
- April 26, 1900, for the Boston Beaneaters

Last MLB appearance
- July 17, 1907, for the Philadelphia Phillies

MLB statistics
- Win–loss record: 115–113
- Earned run average: 3.10
- Strikeouts: 832
- Stats at Baseball Reference

Teams
- Boston Beaneaters (1900–1904); Philadelphia Phillies (1905–1907)

Charles Reno (Togie) Pittinger (January 12, 1872 – January 14, 1909) was an American starting pitcher in Major League Baseball who played for the Boston Beaneaters (1900–1904) and Philadelphia Phillies (1905–1907). Pittinger batted left-handed and threw right-handed. He was born in Greencastle, Pennsylvania. Pittinger was a hard-luck pitcher who played for two of the worst teams in the National League at the turn of the 20th century.

In 1901, Pittinger joined the Boston Beaneaters rotation that included Vic Willis, Bill Dinneen and Kid Nichols. He started 33 games, winning 13 with a 3.01 earned run average in 27 complete appearances. The next season, he collected 27 wins, tying with teammate Willis for the second place in the National League behind Jack Chesbro (29). In 1903, he had 18 victories with a 3.48 ERA, but led the NL with 22 losses. His 1904 season was almost the same, as he went 15–21 with a 2.66 ERA.

Before the 1905 season, Pittinger was sent by Boston to the Philadelphia Phillies in the same trade that brought Chick Fraser and Harry Wolverton to the Beaneaters. Pittinger finished with 23 wins, second to New York Giants star Christy Mathewson (31) for the NL lead. He also led the Phillies in starts (37), complete games (29), innings pitched (337) and strikeouts (136), while posting a 3.09 ERA. Hampered by shoulder problems, Pittinger averaged 8.5 wins and 115 innings from 1906 to 1907. He did not return for the 1908 season.

In an eight-year career, Pittinger posted a 115–113 record with 832 strikeouts and a 3.10 ERA in 2040 2/3 innings pitched.

Pittinger died in Greencastle, Pennsylvania, two days after his 37th birthday due to complications from diabetes.

== See also ==
- List of Major League Baseball career hit batsmen leaders
