= Bill Foxen =

American baseball player (1879–1937)

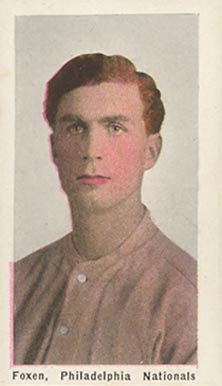
- Pitcher
- Born: May 31, 1879; Tenafly, New Jersey, U.S.
- Died: April 17, 1937 (aged 57); Brooklyn, New York, U.S.
- Batted: Left Threw: Left

MLB debut
- May 5, 1908, for the Philadelphia Phillies

Last MLB appearance
- May 5, 1911, for the Chicago Cubs

MLB statistics
- Win–loss record: 16-20
- Earned run average: 2.56
- Strikeouts: 130
- Stats at Baseball Reference

Teams
- Philadelphia Phillies (1908–1910); Chicago Cubs (1910–1911)

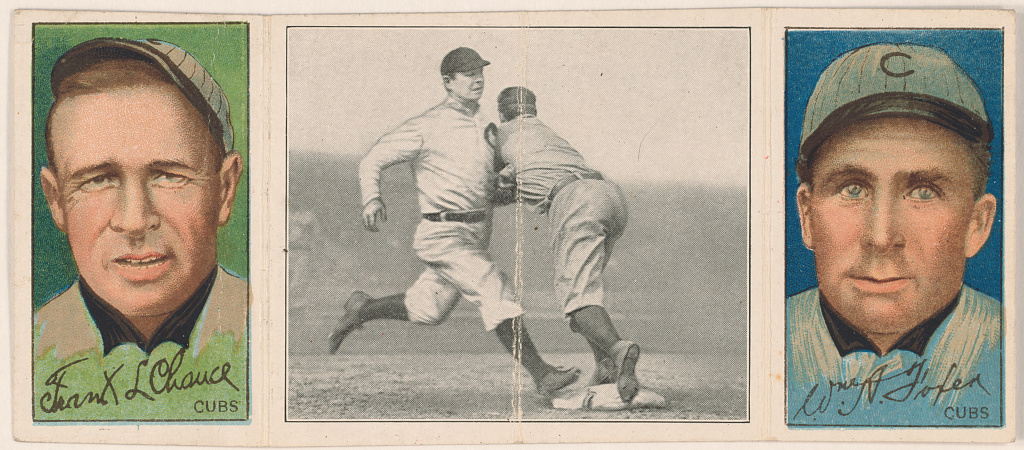
Frank Chance and Bill Foxen baseball card

William Aloysius Foxen (May 31, 1879 in Tenafly, New Jersey – April 17, 1937 in Brooklyn, New York) was an American professional baseball pitcher. He played in Major League Baseball from 1908 to 1911 for the Chicago Cubs and Philadelphia Phillies.
