= Dave Shean =

American baseball player (1883–1963)

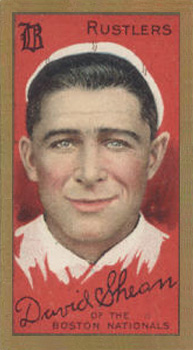
- Second baseman
- Born: July 9, 1883; Arlington, Massachusetts, U.S.
- Died: May 22, 1963 (aged 79); Boston, Massachusetts, U.S.
- Batted: Right Threw: Right

MLB debut
- September 10, 1906, for the Philadelphia Athletics

Last MLB appearance
- July 17, 1919, for the Boston Red Sox

MLB statistics
- Batting average: .228
- Home runs: 6
- Runs batted in: 167
- Stats at Baseball Reference

Teams
- Philadelphia Athletics (1906); Philadelphia Phillies (1908–1909); Boston Doves (1909–1910); Chicago Cubs (1911); Boston Braves (1912); Cincinnati Reds (1917); Boston Red Sox (1918–1919)

Career highlights and awards
- World Series champion (1918)

David William Shean (July 9, 1883 – May 22, 1963) was an American professional baseball second baseman. He played from 1906 through 1919 for the Philadelphia Athletics (1906), Philadelphia Phillies (1908–1909), Boston Doves (1909–1910, 1912), Chicago Cubs (1911), Cincinnati Reds (1917) and Boston Red Sox (1918–1919) of Major League Baseball (MLB). Listed at 5 ft 11 in (1.80 m), 175 lb (79 kg)., Shean batted and threw right-handed. He was born in Arlington, Massachusetts.

A graduate of Fordham University, Shean was a well-traveled utility who spent 14 years in baseball, nine of them in the major leagues. His most productive season came in 1918 with Boston, when he posted career-numbers in batting average (.264) and runs (58), while leading the American League hitters with 36 sacrifice hits. He also was a member of the World Champions Red Sox in the 1918 Series.

In a nine-season career, Shean was a .228 hitter (495-for-2167) with six home runs and 167 RBI in 630 games, including 225 runs, 59 doubles, 23 triples, and 66 stolen bases. In six Series games, he hit .211 (4-for-19) with a double, two runs, and one stolen base.

Following his baseball career, Shean was president of Nathan Robbins Company, a poultry concern. Shean died at the age of 79 in Boston, Massachusetts, after suffering injuries in an automobile accident.
