= Wally Clement =

American baseball player

- Outfielder
- Born: July 21, 1881; Auburn, Maine, U.S.
- Died: November 1, 1953 (aged 72); Coral Gables, Florida, U.S.
- Batted: Left Threw: Right

MLB debut
- August 17, 1908, for the Philadelphia Phillies

Last MLB appearance
- October 6, 1909, for the Brooklyn Superbas

MLB statistics
- Batting average: .253
- Home runs: 0
- Runs batted in: 18
- Stats at Baseball Reference

Teams
- Philadelphia Phillies (1908–1909); Brooklyn Superbas (1909)

Wallace Oakes Clement (July 21, 1881 – November 1, 1953) was an American professional baseball player who played outfield from 1908 to 1909 for the Brooklyn Superbas and Philadelphia Phillies. He attended Tufts University.
