= Pep Deininger =

German baseball player (1877-1950)

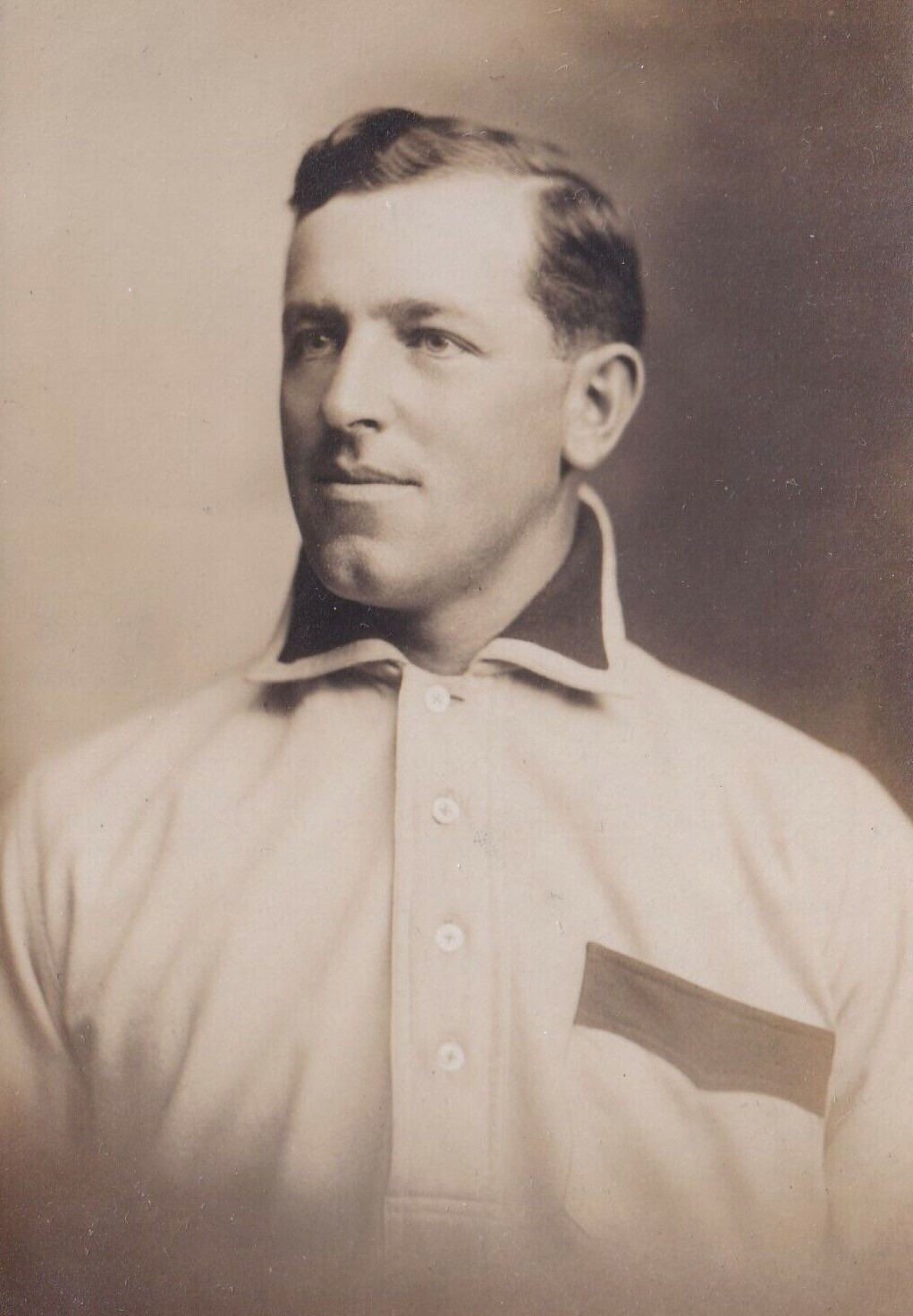
- Deininger in 1912
- Center fielder
- Born: October 10, 1877; Wasseralfingen, German Empire
- Died: September 25, 1950 (aged 72); Boston, Massachusetts, U.S.
- Batted: Left Threw: Left

MLB debut
- April 26, 1902, for the Boston Americans

Last MLB appearance
- October 7, 1909, for the Philadelphia Phillies

MLB statistics
- Batting average: .263
- Runs batted in: 16
- Runs scored: 22
- Stats at Baseball Reference

Teams
- Boston Americans (1902); Philadelphia Phillies (1908–1909)

Otto Charles "Pep" Deininger (October 10, 1877 – September 25, 1950) was a German center fielder in Major League Baseball who played for two different teams between 1902 and 1909. Listed at 5' 8 1/2", 180 lb., Deininger batted and threw left-handed. He was born in Wasseralfingen, Germany.

Deininger started his major league career in 1902 as a pitcher for the Boston Americans. He posted a 9.75 earned run average with two strikeouts and nine walks in two appearances, including one start, and did not have a decision. He later switched to the outfield, appearing in 56 games in parts of two seasons with the Philadelphia Phillies.

In a three-season career, Deininger posted a .263 batting average (46-for-175) with 16 runs batted in and 22 runs scored, including 10 doubles, one triple, and five stolen bases with no home runs.

Deininger died in Boston, Massachusetts, at age 72.

== See also ==
- List of players from Germany in Major League Baseball
