= Fred Osborn =

American baseball player (1883-1954)

- Outfielder
- Born: November 28, 1883; Nevada, Ohio, U.S.
- Died: September 2, 1954 (aged 70); Upper Sandusky, Ohio, U.S.
- Batted: Left Threw: Right

MLB debut
- June 8, 1907, for the Philadelphia Phillies

Last MLB appearance
- July 24, 1909, for the Philadelphia Phillies

MLB statistics
- Batting average: .251
- Home runs: 2
- Runs batted in: 72
- Stats at Baseball Reference

Teams
- Philadelphia Phillies (1907–1909)

Wilferd Pearl Osborn (November 28, 1883 – September 2, 1954) was an American outfielder in Major League Baseball. He played for the Philadelphia Phillies.
