= John McCloskey (pitcher) =

American baseball player (1882-1919)

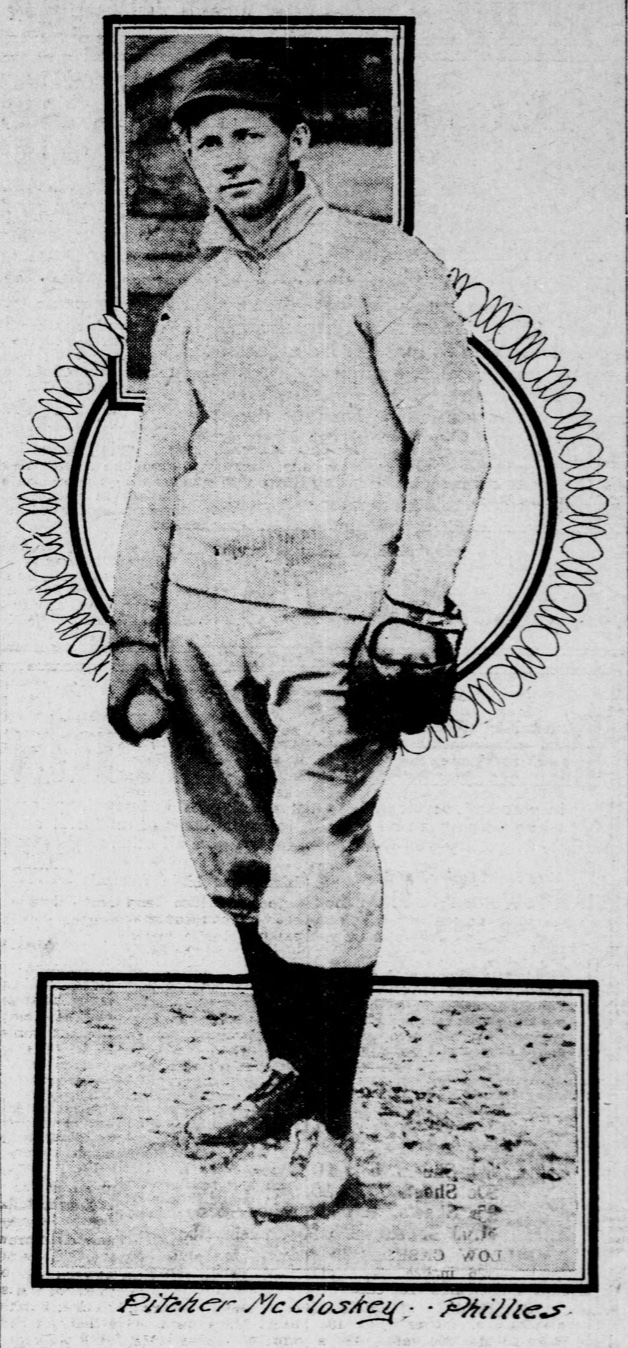
- Pitcher
- Born: August 25, 1882; Laramie, Wyoming Territory, U.S.
- Died: June 5, 1919 (aged 36); Wilkes-Barre, Pennsylvania, U.S.
- Batted: Unknown Threw: Unknown

MLB debut
- May 3, 1906, for the Philadelphia Phillies

Last MLB appearance
- May 31, 1907, for the Philadelphia Phillies

MLB statistics
- Win–loss record: 3-2
- Strikeouts: 9
- Earned run average: 3.60
- Stats at Baseball Reference

Teams
- Philadelphia Phillies (1906–07)

James John McCloskey (August 25, 1882 – June 5, 1919) was an American Major League Baseball pitcher. He pitched parts of two seasons, 1906 and 1907, for the Philadelphia Phillies.

He was the first player born in Wyoming to play in Major League Baseball.

He was killed in the Baltimore Mine Tunnel Disaster in Wilkes-Barre, Pennsylvania on June 5, 1919.
