= George McQuillan =

American baseball player (1885–1940)

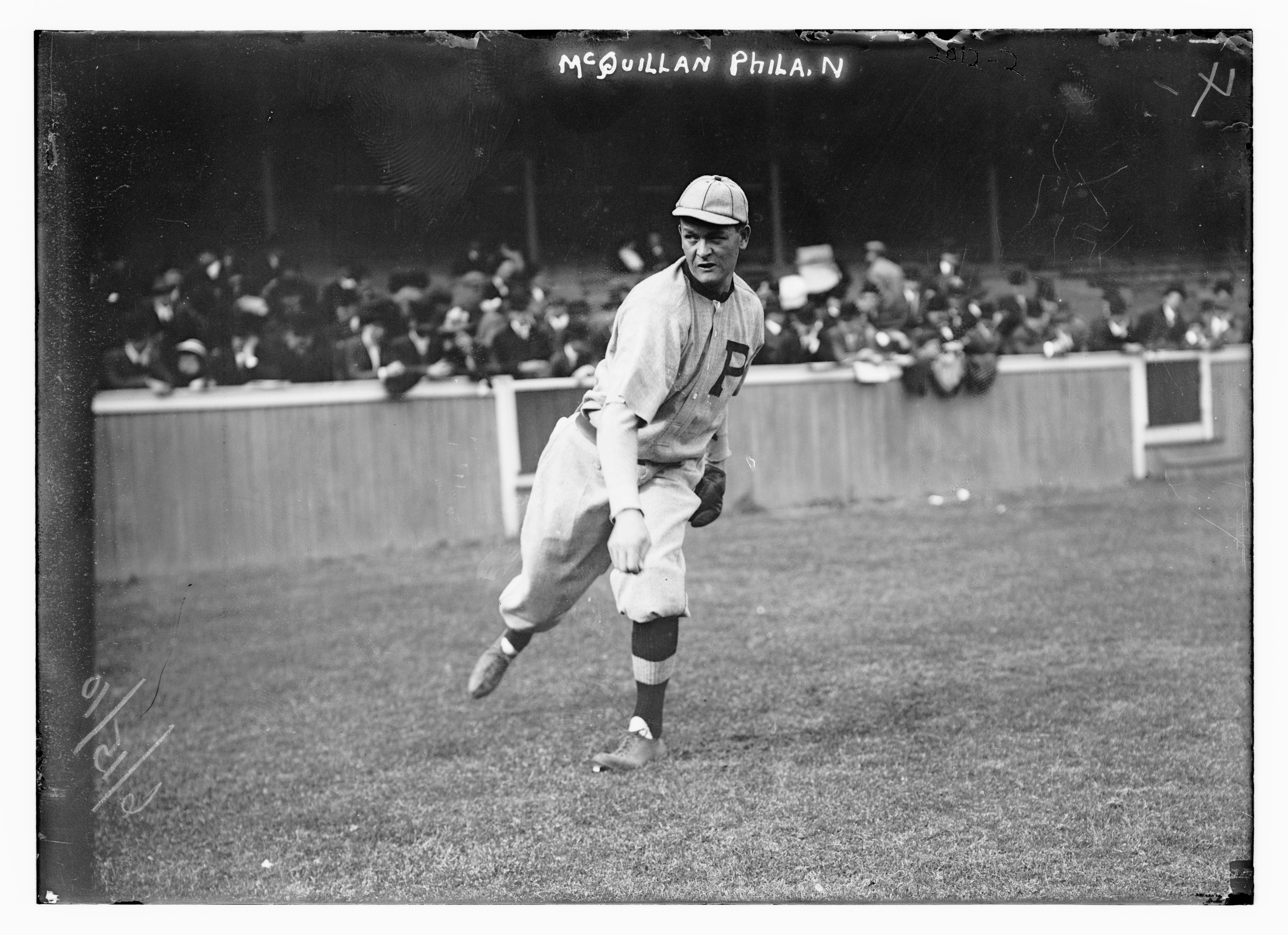
- Pitcher
- Born: May 1, 1885; Brooklyn, New York, U.S.
- Died: March 30, 1940 (aged 54); Columbus, Ohio, U.S.
- Batted: Right Threw: Right

MLB debut
- May 8, 1907, for the Philadelphia Phillies

Last MLB appearance
- September 1, 1918, for the Cleveland Indians

MLB statistics
- Win–loss record: 85–89
- Earned run average: 2.38
- Strikeouts: 590
- Stats at Baseball Reference

Teams
- Philadelphia Phillies (1907–1910); Cincinnati Reds (1911); Pittsburgh Pirates (1913–1915); Philadelphia Phillies (1915–1916); Cleveland Indians (1918)

George Watt McQuillan (May 1, 1885 – March 30, 1940) was an American professional baseball pitcher. He played in Major League Baseball from 1907 to 1918 for the Philadelphia Phillies, Cincinnati Reds, Pittsburgh Pirates and Cleveland Indians.

In 1907 he set one of the longest-lived records in major league history when he pitched 25 innings before giving up the first earned run of his career. Although others have pitched more consecutive innings without an earned run, until July 2008 no one had gone longer without prior major league experience. The record stood for 101 years before being broken by Oakland Athletics reliever Brad Ziegler, who extended the record to 39 1/3 innings.

McQuillan's extraordinary success as a rookie was no fluke: he posted a 1.69 ERA in his first four seasons, comprising more than 800 innings pitched; during those years his Adjusted ERA+ (the ratio of the league's ERA, adjusted to the pitcher's ballpark, to that of the pitcher) was a staggering 164. In 1910, he would have led the majors with an Adjusted ERA+ of 195 had he pitched only an additional 1 2/3 innings to meet the minimum requirement of 154 innings pitched.

McQuillan helped the Phillies win the 1915 National League Pennant. He is still the Philadelphia Phillies Career Leader in ERA (1.79), WHIP (1.02) and Hits Allowed/9IP (6.93). He currently ranks 23rd on the MLB Career ERA List (2.38), 37th on the WHIP List (1.131) and 86th on the Hits Allowed/9IP List (7.89).

In 10 seasons he had an 85–89 Win–loss record, 273 Games (173 Started), 105 Complete Games, 17 Shutouts, 76 Games Finished, 14 Saves, 1,576 1/3 Innings Pitched, 1,382 Hits Allowed, 577 Runs Allowed, 417 Earned Runs Allowed, 23 Home Runs Allowed, 401 Walks Allowed, 590 Strikeouts, 30 Hit Batsmen, 16 Wild Pitches, 6,297 Batters Faced, a 2.38 ERA and 1.131 WHIP.

McQuillan's major league career was cut short due to his chronic alcoholism and infection by syphilis. However, he continued to play and coach in the minor leagues and semi-pro ball. He died in Columbus, Ohio at the age of 54.

== Sources ==
- Career statistics from Baseball Reference · Baseball Reference (Minors) · Retrosheet · Baseball Almanac
