= Buster Brown (baseball) =

American baseball player (1881–1914)

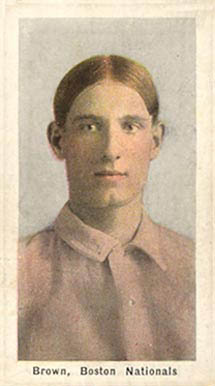
- Pitcher
- Born: August 31, 1881; Boone, Iowa, U.S.
- Died: February 9, 1914 (aged 32); Sioux City, Iowa, U.S.
- Batted: Right Threw: Right

MLB debut
- June 22, 1905, for the St. Louis Cardinals

Last MLB appearance
- April 26, 1913, for the Boston Braves

MLB statistics
- Win–loss record: 51–103
- Earned run average: 3.21
- Strikeouts: 501
- Stats at Baseball Reference

Teams
- St. Louis Cardinals (1905–1907); Philadelphia Phillies (1907–1909); Boston Doves/Braves (1909–1913)

Charles Edward "Buster" Brown (August 31, 1881 – February 9, 1914) was an American Major League Baseball pitcher from 1905 to 1913. He played for the Philadelphia Phillies, St. Louis Cardinals, and Boston Braves. He has the record for the lowest career winning percentage of any pitcher with a minimum of 150 decisions at .327 for a record of 51 wins and 105 losses. Brown died of blood poisoning following an operation to remove a growth under his right arm. He is buried in Onawa, Iowa.
