= Frank Corridon =

American baseball player (1880–1941)

- Pitcher
- Born: November 25, 1880; Newport, Rhode Island, U.S.
- Died: February 21, 1941 (aged 60); Syracuse, New York, U.S.
- Batted: Switch Threw: Right

MLB debut
- April 15, 1904, for the Chicago Cubs

Last MLB appearance
- September 7, 1910, for the St. Louis Cardinals

MLB statistics
- Win–loss record: 70–67
- Earned run average: 2.80
- Strikeouts: 458
- Stats at Baseball Reference

Teams
- Chicago Cubs (1904); Philadelphia Phillies (1904–1905, 1907–1909); St. Louis Cardinals (1910)

Frank Joseph Corridon [Fiddler] (November 25, 1880 – February 21, 1941) was an American pitcher in Major League Baseball who played for three teams between the 1904 and 1910 seasons. Listed at 6 ft 0 in (1.83 m) 170 lb., Corridon was a switch-hitter and threw right-handed. He was born in Newport, Rhode Island.

Corridon entered the majors in 1904 with the Chicago Cubs, appearing for them in 24 games before joining the Philadelphia Phillies (1904–1905, 1907–1909) and St. Louis Cardinals (1910). His most productive season came with the 1907 Phillies, when he posted career-numbers in wins (18), starts (32), complete games (23) and innings pitched (274.0), while collecting a 2.46 ERA. He finished 14–10 with a 2.51 ERA the next season, and went 11–7 with a career-high 2.11 in 1909. He faded to 6–14 with the Cardinals in 1910, his last major league season.

In a six-year career, Corridon posted a 70–67 record with a 2.80 ERA in 180 appearances, including 140 starts, 99 complete games, 10 shutouts, seven saves and 1216.0 innings of work, posting a 1.22 strikeout-to-walk ratio (458-to-375).

Corridon died at the age of 60 in Syracuse, New York.
