= Lew Moren =

American baseball player (1883–1966)

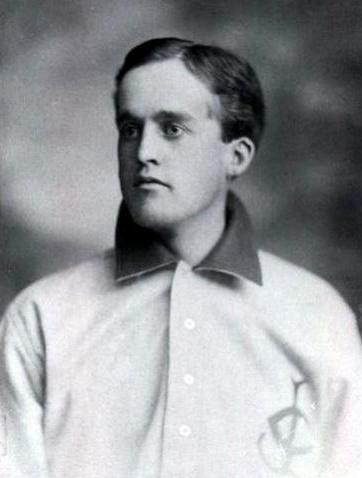
- Pitcher
- Born: August 4, 1883; Pittsburgh, Pennsylvania
- Died: November 2, 1966 (aged 83); Pittsburgh, Pennsylvania
- Batted: Right Threw: Right

MLB debut
- September 21, 1903, for the Pittsburgh Pirates

Last MLB appearance
- September 23, 1910, for the Philadelphia Phillies

MLB statistics
- Win–loss record: 48-57
- Earned run average: 2.95
- Strikeouts: 356
- Stats at Baseball Reference

Teams
- Pittsburgh Pirates (1903–1904); Philadelphia Phillies (1907–1910)

Lewis Howard "Hicks" Moren (August 4, 1883 – November 2, 1966) was a Major League Baseball pitcher. He pitched six seasons from 1903 to 1910: two seasons with the Pittsburgh Pirates and four seasons with the Philadelphia Phillies. In 1908, Moren was credited by the New York Press for inventing the knuckleball; however Eddie Cicotte is today more often cited as the inventor of the pitch. Moren retired with a career record of 48 wins, 57 losses, and a 2.95 earned run average.

Moren committed suicide in Pittsburgh, Pennsylvania by slitting his throat.

== See also ==
- List of knuckleball pitchers
