= Ernie Courtney =

American baseball player (1875–1920)

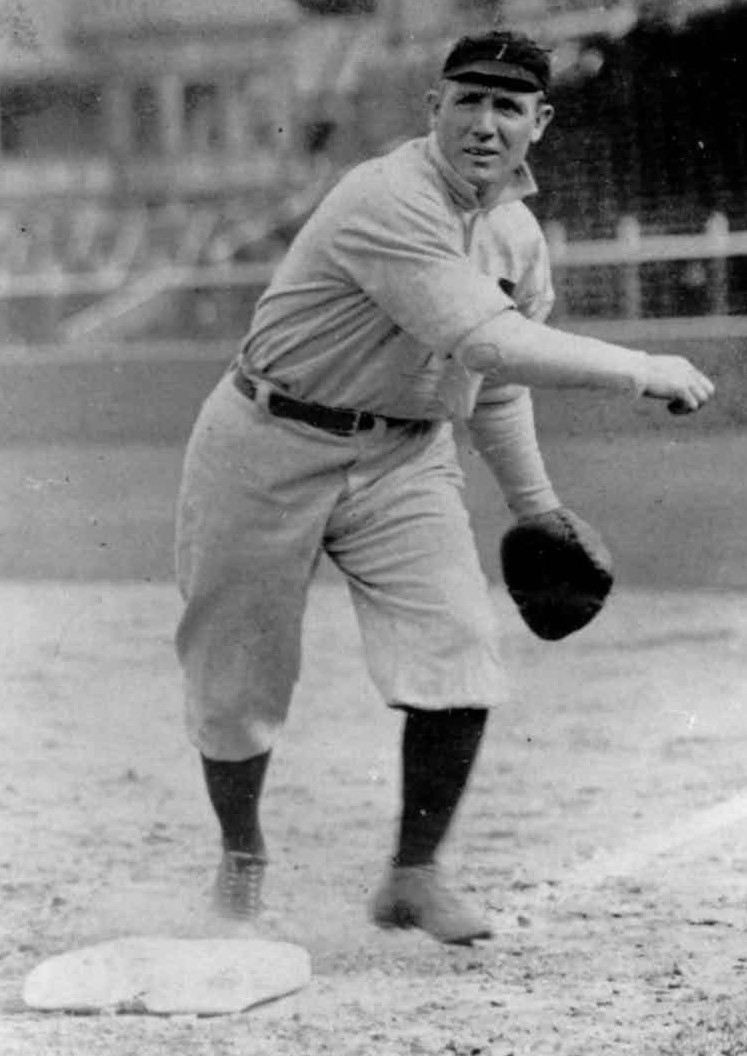
- Infielder/Outfielder
- Born: January 20, 1875; Des Moines, Iowa, U.S.
- Died: February 29, 1920 (aged 45); Buffalo, New York, U.S.
- Batted: Left Threw: Right

MLB debut
- April 17, 1902, for the Boston Beaneaters

Last MLB appearance
- October 2, 1908, for the Philadelphia Phillies

MLB statistics
- Batting average: .245
- Home runs: 5
- Hits: 471
- Runs batted in: 200
- Stats at Baseball Reference

Teams
- Boston Beaneaters (1902); Baltimore Orioles (1902); New York Highlanders (1903); Detroit Tigers (1903); Philadelphia Phillies (1905–1908)

Edward Ernest Courtney (January 20, 1875 – February 29, 1920) was an American third baseman in Major League Baseball who played for the Boston Beaneaters (1902), Baltimore Orioles (1902), New York Highlanders (1903), Detroit Tigers (1903) and Philadelphia Phillies (1905–1908). Courtney batted left-handed and threw right-handed. He was born in Des Moines, Iowa.

== Career ==
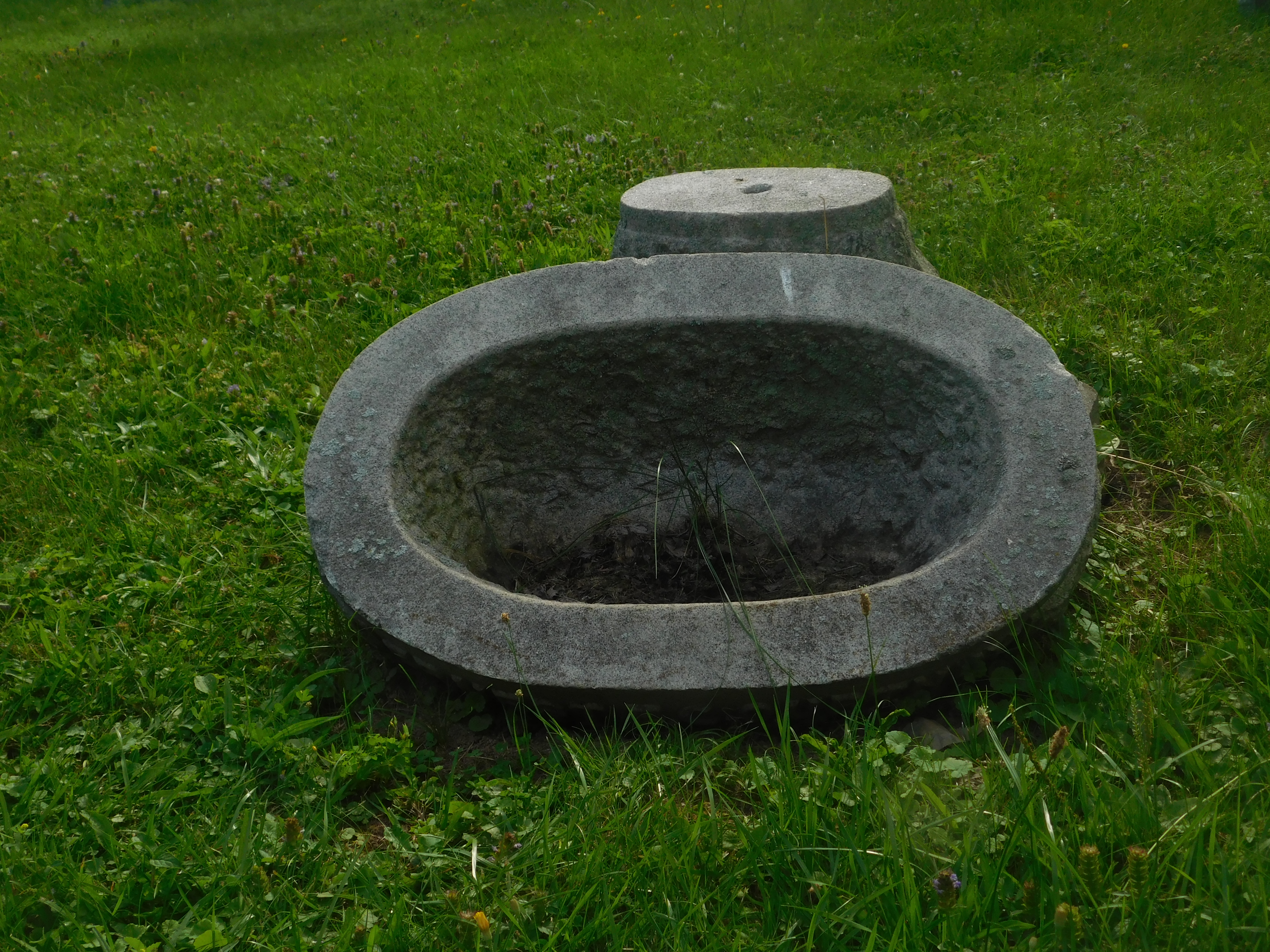
The grave site of Courtney in Buffalo Cemetery in Cheektowaga, New York

In a six-season career, Courtney posted a .245 batting average with five home runs and 200 RBI in 558 games played. He led the National League in games played in 1905.

Courtney died of heart issues on February 29, 1920 in Buffalo, New York while living with his mother. He left a small estate for his widow, Cornelia Courtney upon his death.
