= John Titus (baseball) =

American baseball player (1876-1943)

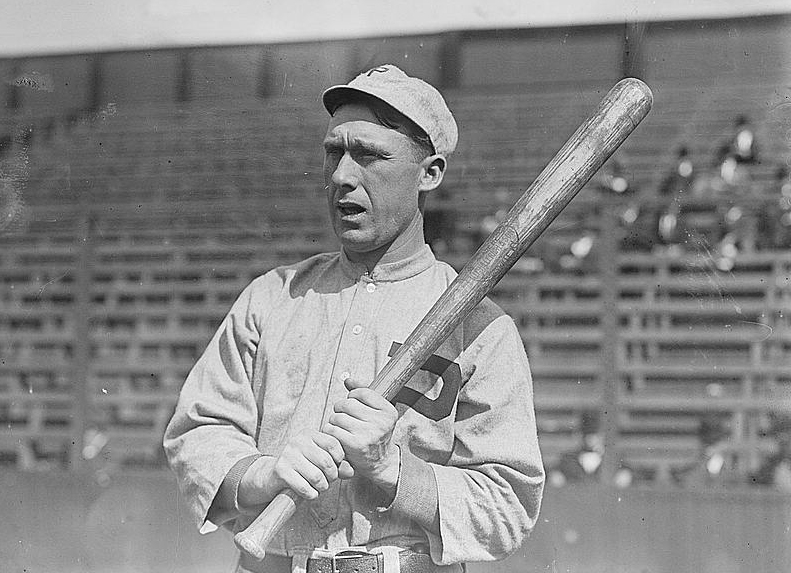
- Outfielder
- Born: February 21, 1876; St. Clair, Pennsylvania, U.S.
- Died: January 8, 1943 (aged 66); St. Clair, Pennsylvania, U.S.
- Batted: Left Threw: Left

MLB debut
- June 8, 1903, for the Philadelphia Phillies

Last MLB appearance
- August 8, 1913, for the Boston Braves

MLB statistics
- Batting average: .282
- Home runs: 38
- Runs batted in: 564
- Stats at Baseball Reference

Teams
- Philadelphia Phillies (1903–1912); Boston Braves (1912–1913)

John Franklin Titus (February 21, 1876 – January 8, 1943), nicknamed "Tightpants", was an American professional baseball outfielder, who played in Major League Baseball (MLB) for the Philadelphia Phillies (1903–12) and Boston Braves (1912–13). Titus’ most notable accomplishment was that he led the National League (NL) in being hit by pitches (16), in 1909 and ranks 74th on the MLB career Hit By Pitch list (94).

To baseball card collectors, Titus is also notable for the card depicting him in the T206 set, as it is the only one in which the player has a mustache. At the time of his death, it was noted that Titus was the last player to sport a handlebar mustache. It was noted when Titus shaved his mustache during spring training in March 1908.

In 11 big league seasons, Titus played in 1,402 games and had 4,960 at bats, 738 runs, 1,401 hits, 253 doubles, 72 triples, 38 home runs, 564 RBI, 140 stolen bases, 620 walks, a .282 batting average, a .373 on-base percentage, a .385 slugging percentage, 1,912 total bases, and 144 sacrifice hits.

On January 8, 1943, Titus died in his hometown of St. Clair, Pennsylvania, at the age of 66.

== Sources ==
- Career statistics from Baseball Reference · Fangraphs · Baseball Reference (Minors) · Retrosheet · Baseball Almanac
