= Sherry Magee =

American baseball player (1884–1929)

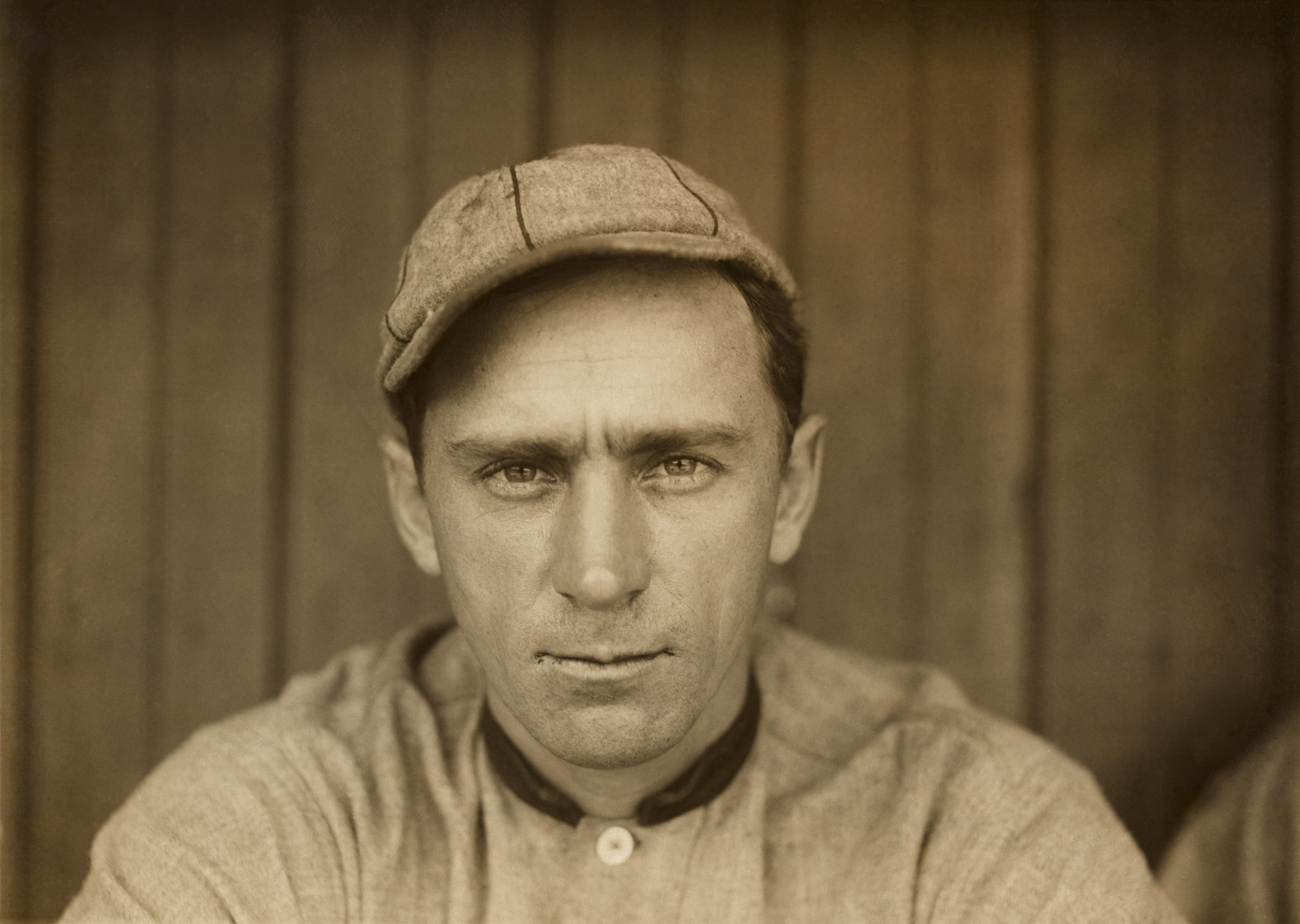
- Magee in 1911
- Left fielder
- Born: August 6, 1884; Clarendon, Pennsylvania, U.S.
- Died: March 13, 1929 (aged 44); Philadelphia, Pennsylvania, U.S.
- Batted: Right Threw: Right

MLB debut
- June 29, 1904, for the Philadelphia Phillies

Last MLB appearance
- September 27, 1919, for the Cincinnati Reds

MLB statistics
- Batting average: .291
- Hits: 2,169
- Home runs: 83
- Runs batted in: 1,176
- Stolen bases: 441
- Stats at Baseball Reference

Teams
- Philadelphia Phillies (1904–1914); Boston Braves (1915–1917); Cincinnati Reds (1917–1919)

Career highlights and awards
- World Series champion (1919); NL batting champion (1910); 4× NL RBI leader (1907, 1910, 1914, 1918); Philadelphia Phillies Wall of Fame

Sherwood Robert "Sherry" Magee (August 6, 1884 – March 13, 1929) was an American left fielder in Major League Baseball. From 1904 through 1919, Magee played with the Philadelphia Phillies (1904–1914), Boston Braves (1915–1917) and Cincinnati Reds (1917–1919). He batted and threw right-handed and in a 16-season career posted a .291 batting average with 83 home runs and 1,176 runs batted in through 2,087 games played.

== Career ==
A native of Clarendon, Pennsylvania, Magee was one of the premier hitters of the dead-ball era. He was picked out by local Phillies scout Jim Randall when he had heard about the exploits of Magee on the local diamond, and it resulted in an impromptu tryout that resulted in a spot for Magee on the Phillies. He started his first game as a left fielder against the Brooklyn Superbas on June 29, 1904.

From 1905 through 1914, Magee finished in the National League top 10 in home runs and runs batted in (RBI) seven times, including leading the National League in RBIs four times. He led the league for a fourth time in the 1918 campaign, which was shortened by World War I and the Spanish flu pandemic. Magee also hit over .300 five times, including a batting title to his credit as well, while also being known as one of the finest defensive outfielders of his day. He collected 2,169 hits and 441 stolen bases, including 23 steals of home plate.

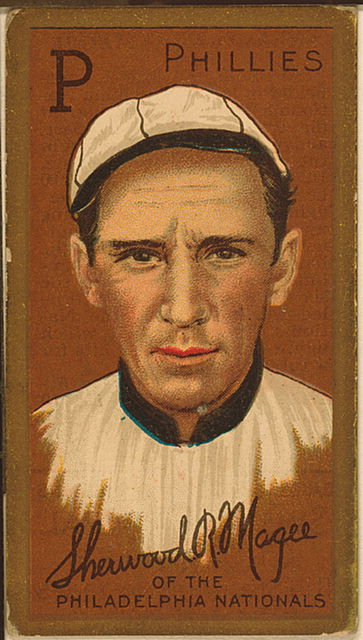
Magee's 1911 baseball card.

Magee would play eleven years with the Phillies while spending the last year as team captain. His 85 RBIs in 1905 were a league high. His most productive season came in 1910, when he led the league in batting (.310), RBIs (123), runs (110), total bases (263), on-base percentage (.445), slugging average (.507) and OPS (.952), and finished second in doubles (39) and triples (17).

On July 10, 1911, Magee (allegedly drunk) struck umpire Bill Finneran as a result of disputing a called third strike, knocking him unconscious, at which he was suspended for the remainder of the season, although on appeal the suspension was shortened to just over a month, 36 games.

In 1914 Magee led the league in hits (171), doubles (39), RBIs (103), extra base hits (65), total bases (277) and slugging (.509). A year later, he was traded to the Boston Braves. He remained at Boston until the 1917 midseason, when he was sent to the Cincinnati Reds. In 1918, he led the league in RBIs (76) for the fourth time. In 1919, Magee was seriously ill for two months and he concluded his major league career by pinch-hitting twice during the 1919 World Series, which resulted in one hit and a championship for Magee. In the Dead-ball era of 1900 to 1920, Magee was 7th among all hitters with 2,169.

== Later life ==
Magee later played in the minors and also umpired in the New York–Penn League (1927) and the National League (1928). A victim of pneumonia, Magee died in Philadelphia, at age 44.

He is buried at Arlington Cemetery in Drexel Hill, Pennsylvania.

In 2008, he was one of ten pre-1943 players to be considered by the Cooperstown Veterans Committee for induction into the National Baseball Hall of Fame.

== See also ==
- List of Major League Baseball career hits leaders
- List of Major League Baseball career doubles leaders
- List of Major League Baseball career triples leaders
- List of Major League Baseball career runs scored leaders
- List of Major League Baseball career runs batted in leaders
- List of Major League Baseball annual runs batted in leaders
- List of Major League Baseball batting champions
- List of Major League Baseball annual runs scored leaders
- List of Major League Baseball annual doubles leaders
- List of Major League Baseball career stolen bases leaders
