= Tully Sparks =

American baseball player (1874–1937)

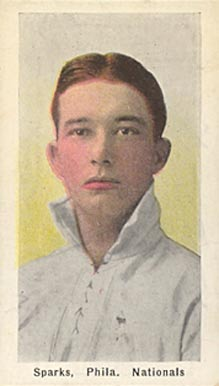
- Pitcher
- Born: December 12, 1874; Etna, Georgia, U.S.
- Died: July 15, 1937 (aged 62); Anniston, Alabama, U.S.
- Batted: Right Threw: Right

MLB debut
- September 15, 1897, for the Philadelphia Phillies

Last MLB appearance
- June 8, 1910, for the Philadelphia Phillies

MLB statistics
- Win–loss record: 121–136
- Earned run average: 2.79
- Strikeouts: 778
- Stats at Baseball Reference

Teams
- Philadelphia Phillies (1897); Pittsburgh Pirates (1899); Milwaukee Brewers (1901); New York Giants (1902); Boston Americans (1902); Philadelphia Phillies (1903–1910)

Thomas Frank "Tully" Sparks (December 12, 1874 – July 15, 1937) was an American professional baseball player who played pitcher in the Major Leagues from 1897 to 1910. Sparks played for the Philadelphia Phillies, Pittsburgh Pirates, Milwaukee Brewers, New York Giants, and Boston Americans. He was an alumnus of Beloit College.

In 1899, while with the Pirates, Sparks led the National League in relief innings pitched.

After retirement, Sparks worked a variety of careers, including cotton sales, real estate and ore salesman before making a career as an insurance executive. He settled in Anniston, Alabama in 1931 with a local insurance firm. On June 28, 1937, Sparks was diagnosed with heart disease, dying on July 15 at the age of 62. His body was interred at Edgemont Cemetery in Anniston.

== See also ==
- Top 100 Major League Baseball hit batsmen leaders
