= Kitty Bransfield =

American baseball player (1875–1947)

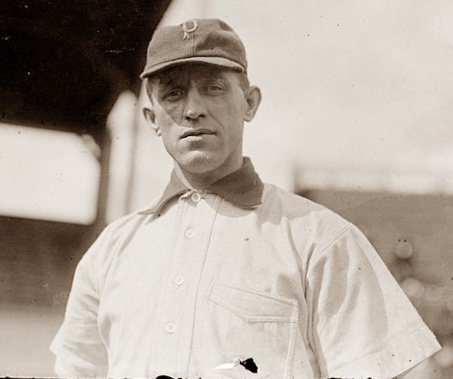
- First baseman
- Born: January 7, 1875; Worcester, Massachusetts, U.S.
- Died: May 1, 1947 (aged 72); Worcester, Massachusetts, U.S.
- Batted: Right Threw: Right

MLB debut
- August 22, 1898, for the Boston Beaneaters

Last MLB appearance
- September 14, 1911, for the Chicago Cubs

MLB statistics
- Batting average: .270
- Home runs: 13
- Runs batted in: 637
- Stats at Baseball Reference

Teams
- Boston Beaneaters (1898); Pittsburgh Pirates (1901–1904); Philadelphia Phillies (1905–1911); Chicago Cubs (1911)

William Edward "Kitty" Bransfield (January 7, 1875 – May 1, 1947) was an American professional baseball first baseman. He played in Major League Baseball (MLB) from 1898 to 1911 for the Boston Beaneaters, Pittsburgh Pirates, Philadelphia Phillies, and Chicago Cubs.

== Playing career ==
Bransfield played a season of semipro baseball with a team in Grafton in 1897. After a brief major league stint with Boston in 1898, Bransfield returned to the big leagues with the Pittsburgh Pirates in 1901. He played four seasons with the team, most notably serving as the Pirates first baseman in 1903, the year in which the team lost the inaugural World Series to Boston. He subsequently played for the Philadelphia Phillies and Chicago Cubs.

In 1330 games over 12 seasons, Bransfield posted a .270 batting average (1351-for-4999) with 529 runs, 225 doubles, 75 triples, 13 home runs, 637 RBI, 175 stolen bases, 221 bases on balls, .304 on-base percentage, and .353 slugging percentage. He finished his career with a .983 fielding percentage. In the 1903 World Series, he hit .207 (6-for-29) with 3 runs and 1 RBI.

== Later life ==
After his playing career, Bransfield spent time as an umpire, scout, and manager. He managed the Montreal club briefly, then umpired in the Eastern and New England Leagues from 1915 to 1921. He was then signed as a scout for the Chicago Cubs for the 1922 season. In 1923, he managed the Waterbury club in the New England League.
