= Lew Richie =

American baseball player (1883–1936)

Lew Richite
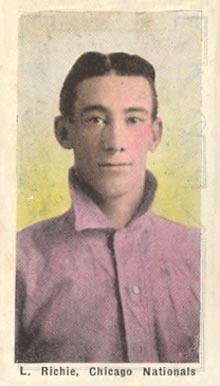
- Pitcher
- Born: August 23, 1883; Ambler, Pennsylvania, U.S.
- Died: August 15, 1936 (aged 52); Ambler, Pennsylvania, U.S.
- Batted: Right Threw: Right

MLB debut
- May 8, 1906, for the Philadelphia Phillies

Last MLB appearance
- August 8, 1913, for the Chicago Cubs

MLB statistics
- Win–loss record: 74–65
- Earned run average: 2.54
- Strikeouts: 438
- Stats at Baseball Reference

Teams
- Philadelphia Phillies (1906–1909); Boston Doves (1909–1910); Chicago Cubs (1910–1913)

Elwood Lewis Richie (August 23, 1883 in Ambler, Pennsylvania – August 15, 1936 in South Mountain, Pennsylvania), was an American professional baseball player was a pitcher in the Major Leagues from 1906 to 1913. He played for the Chicago Cubs, Boston Doves and Philadelphia Phillies.

== Biography ==
Richie signed to play for the Tri-State League's Williamsport team in 1906. The Tri-State League was an "outlaw league" whose contracts were not respected by Major League Baseball, and Richie jumped his 1906 Williamsport contract to sign with the Phillies.

Richie was a gifted musician and minstrel show performer during his playing career. Minstrel entertainer George "Honey Boy" Evans practiced with the Phillies in spring training in 1908. Richie brought his instruments to Savannah, Georgia where the team trained, and he and Evans organized the other players into a minstrel troupe for evening entertainment.
