= Billy Murray (baseball) =

American baseball player and manager

- Manager
- Born: April 13, 1864; Peabody, Massachusetts, U.S.
- Died: March 25, 1937 (aged 72); Youngstown, Ohio, U.S.
- Batted: Unknown Threw: Unknown

MLB debut
- April 11, 1907, for the Philadelphia Phillies

Last MLB appearance
- October 7, 1909, for the Philadelphia Phillies

MLB statistics
- Games managed: 458
- Win–loss record: 240–214
- Winning %: .529

Teams
- Philadelphia Phillies (1907–1909)

William Jeremiah Murray (April 13, 1864 — March 25, 1937) was one of the most successful managers in American minor league baseball during the late 19th and early 20th centuries. He also spent three seasons (1907–09) in Major League Baseball as manager of the Philadelphia Phillies of the National League.

== Biography ==
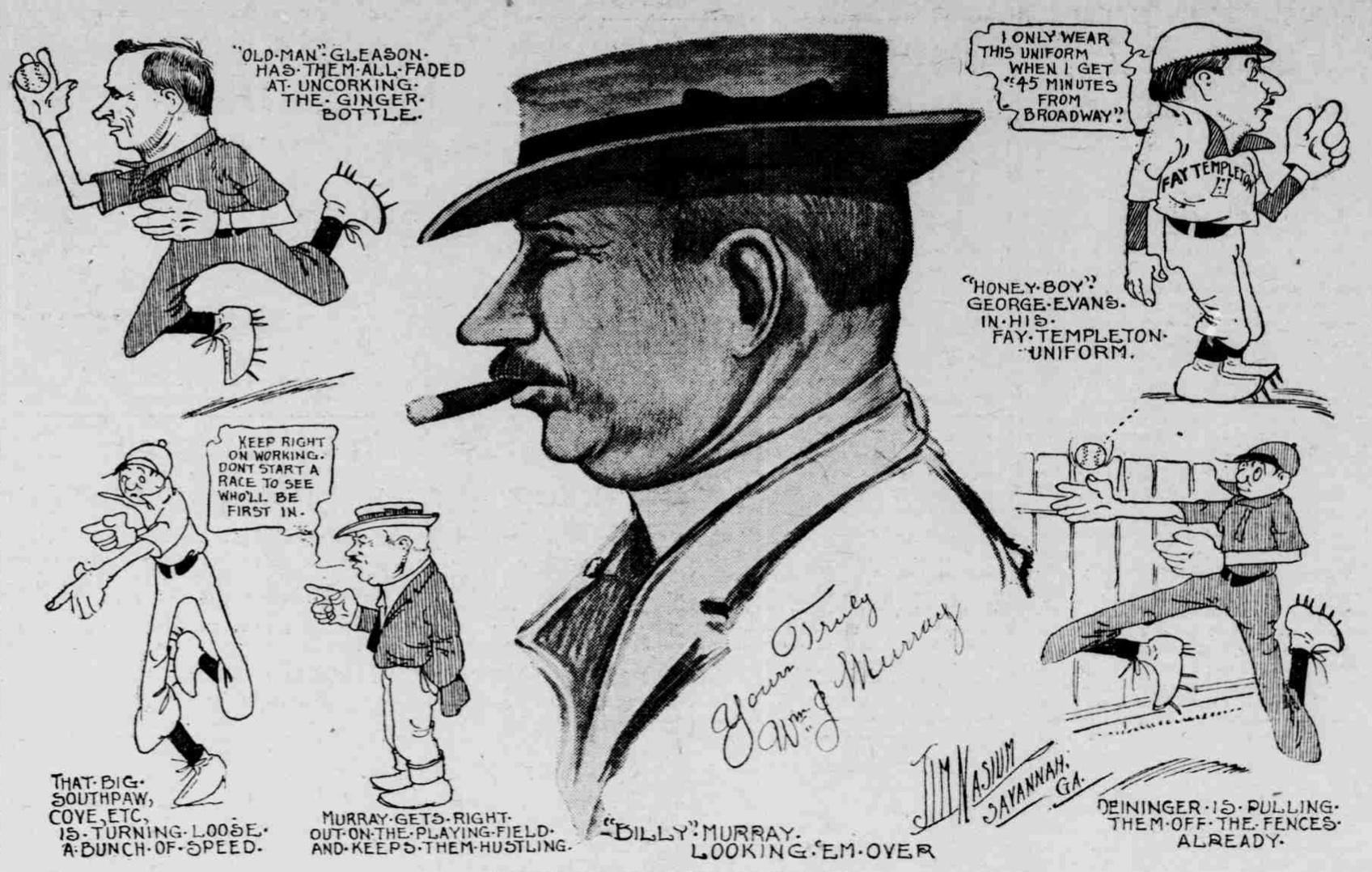
Billy Murray in 1908 as drawn by Jim Nasium (Edgar Forrest Wolfe) for the Philadelphia Inquirer

A native of Peabody, Massachusetts, Murray entered professional baseball in 1884 as an outfielder for the nearby Salem club in the Massachusetts State Association. He began his minor league managing career at age 25 with the Quincy, Illinois, Ravens of the Central Interstate League in 1889. After winning back-to-back pennants at Quincy and Joliet of the Illinois–Iowa League in 1891–92, Murray spent nine seasons (1894–1902) as skipper of the Providence Grays of the top-level Eastern League (a forerunner of today's International League). He then spent four winning seasons as manager of the Jersey City Skeeters of the Eastern circuit, taking one league pennant. His record as a minor league manager was 1,234 victories and 876 defeats over 18 seasons, a winning percentage of .585, one of the highest among longtime minor league managers.

Murray then took the helm of the Phillies in 1907, inheriting a fourth-place team that had won only 71 games during 1906. Murray promptly led the Phils to 83 victories and a third-place finish in 1907, but his club finished 21 1/2 games in arrears of the league champion Chicago Cubs. His 1908 club also won 83 games, but fell to fourth, 16 games behind Chicago. When the 1909 Phillies tumbled even further, to 74 wins and a fifth-place finish, 36 1/2 games behind the Pittsburgh Pirates, Murray was replaced as manager by Red Dooin. His career record as a major-league manager was 240–214 (.529).

He died in Youngstown, Ohio, at the age of 72, and is interred in St. Mary's Cemetery, Salem, Massachusetts.

== Sources ==
- Bucek, Jeanine, ed. dir., The Baseball Encyclopedia. New York: Macmillan Books, 1996.
- Johnson, Lloyd, ed., The Minor League Register. Durham, North Carolina: Baseball America, 1994.
