= Mickey Doolin =

American baseball player (1880–1951)

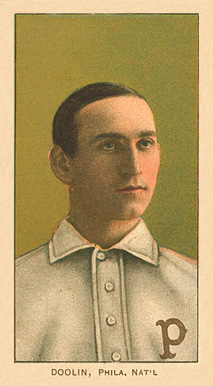
- Shortstop
- Born: May 7, 1880; Ashland, Pennsylvania, U.S.
- Died: November 1, 1951 (aged 71); Orlando, Florida, U.S.
- Batted: Right Threw: Right

MLB debut
- April 14, 1905, for the Philadelphia Phillies

Last MLB appearance
- September 2, 1918, for the Brooklyn Robins

MLB statistics
- Batting average: .230
- Home runs: 15
- Runs batted in: 554
- Stats at Baseball Reference

Teams
- Philadelphia Phillies (1905–1913); Baltimore Terrapins (1915); Chicago Whales (1915); Chicago Cubs (1916); New York Giants (1916); Brooklyn Robins (1918)

Michael Joseph "Mickey" Doolin (May 7, 1880 in Ashland, Pennsylvania – November 1, 1951 in Orlando, Florida) was an American professional baseball player who played shortstop in the Major Leagues from 1905 to 1918. During his career, he played for the Philadelphia Phillies, Baltimore Terrapins, Chicago Whales, Chicago Cubs, New York Giants, and Brooklyn Robins. His name is often misspelled as "Doolan" due to many of his baseball cards being misspelled.

== See also ==
- List of Major League Baseball career stolen bases leaders
