= Bill Shettsline =

American baseball executive and manager (1863–1933)

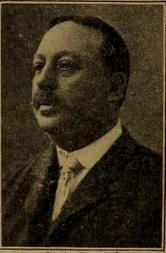
- Manager / President
- Born: October 25, 1863; Philadelphia, Pennsylvania, U.S.
- Died: February 22, 1933 (aged 69); Philadelphia, Pennsylvania, U.S.

Teams
- As manager: Philadelphia Phillies (1898–1902); As president: Philadelphia Phillies (1904–1909)

William Joseph Shettsline (October 25, 1863 – February 22, 1933) was a baseball executive who served as the business manager of the Philadelphia Phillies of the National League from 1896 to 1926. He also served as club president from 1904 to 1909 and manager from 1898 to 1902.

Shettsline began his career with the Phillies in 1883 as an office boy and by 1896 was the club's secretary and business manager. In 1898, upon the firing of George Stallings, he was given the managerial reins. In his five seasons at the helm, Shettsline posted a 367–302 record, with his best season in 1899. However, the team's 94–58 record that year was only good enough for third place in the National League. In 1902, Shettsline also served as general manager of the Philadelphia Phillies of the National Football League, a three-team football league not related to the present-day NFL.

On February 28, 1903, the Phillies were sold to James Potter and Shettsline was moved from manager to his former position as secretary and business manager. On November 30, 1904, Shettsline became team president. Shettsline was replaced as president when the club was sold in 1909 but stayed on as business manager until November 19, 1926. He joined the business staff of the Philadelphia Athletics the following year.

Shettsline died on February 22, 1933, in Philadelphia at the age of 69.
