= Red Dooin =

American baseball player and manager (1879–1952)

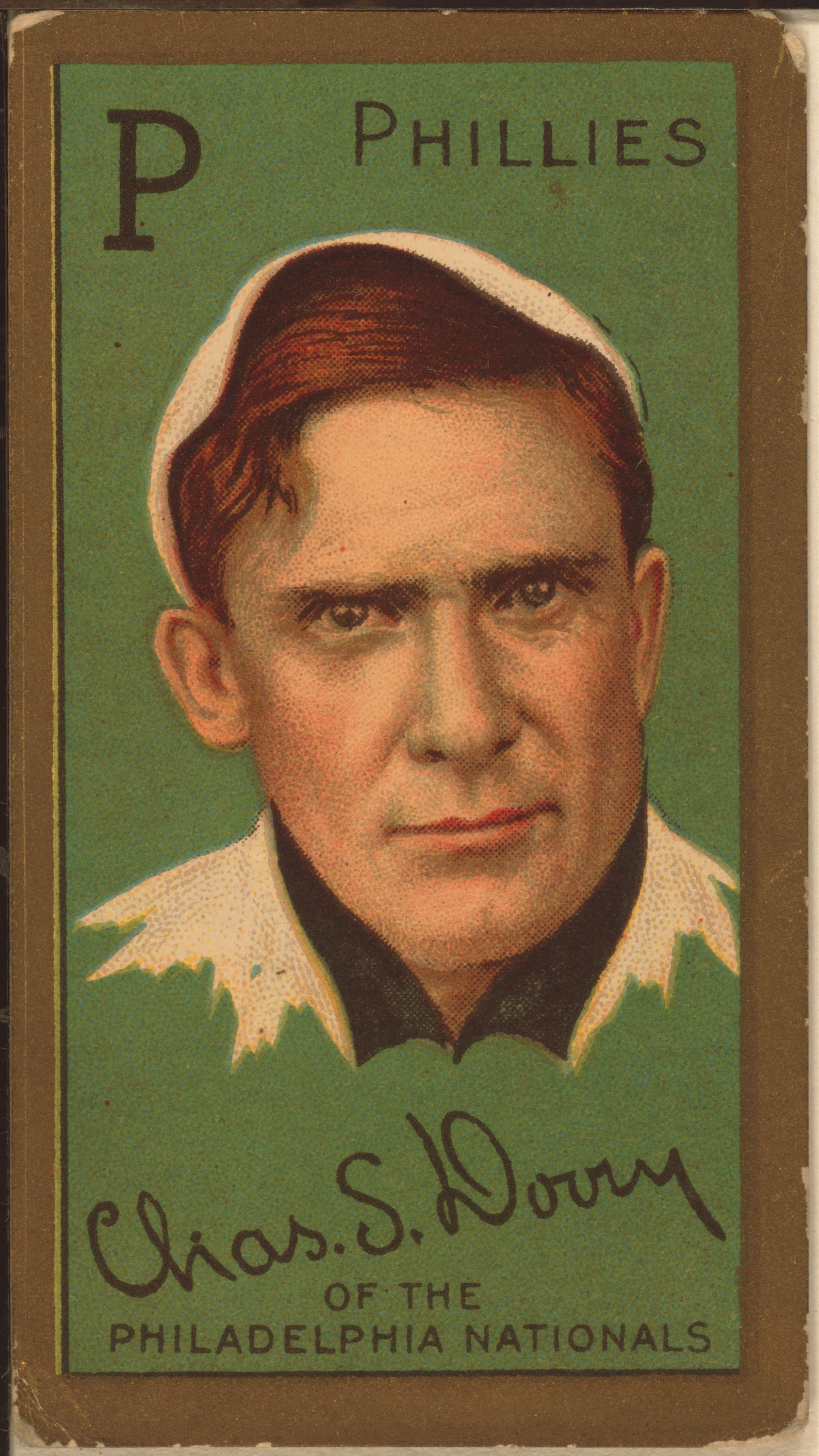
- Catcher / Manager
- Born: June 12, 1879; Cincinnati, Ohio, U.S.
- Died: May 12, 1952 (aged 72); Rochester, New York, U.S.
- Batted: Right Threw: Right

MLB debut
- April 18, 1902, for the Philadelphia Phillies

Last MLB appearance
- June 24, 1916, for the New York Giants

MLB statistics
- Batting average: .240
- Home runs: 10
- Runs batted in: 344
- Managerial record: 392–370
- Winning %: .514
- Stats at Baseball Reference

Teams
- As player: Philadelphia Phillies (1902–1914); Cincinnati Reds (1915); New York Giants (1915–1916); As manager: Philadelphia Phillies (1910–1914)

Charles Sebastian "Red" Dooin (June 12, 1879 – May 12, 1952) was an American professional baseball player and manager. A catcher in Major League Baseball during the first two decades of the 20th century, he played 1,219 of his 1,290 games as a member of the Philadelphia Phillies and managed the Phils from 1910 through 1914.

== Biography ==
Born in Cincinnati, Ohio, Dooin began his career with the St. Joseph, Missouri club of the Western League in 1900. Two years later, he reached the Phillies and the National League, catching in 84 games. He was the club's regular catcher from 1904 through 1910, and although a broken ankle and a broken leg – suffered in plays at home plate in 1910 and 1911 – curtailed his playing career, he stayed in the majors as a catcher through 1916. A right-handed hitter, he batted .240 with ten career home runs. Oddly, six of those home runs came in one season: 1904, Dooin's first season as a full-time regular.

In 1910, Dooin succeeded Billy Murray as manager of the Phils; under Murray, the Quakers had placed fifth in 1909. Player-manager Dooin piloted the Phillies for five years and compiled a winning record (392–370, .514). Moreover, along with fellow catcher and player-coach Pat Moran, he nurtured the great pitcher Grover Cleveland Alexander to stardom in his earliest big league seasons. The Phillies rose to second place in the 1913 NL, but when they fell to sixth the following season, Dooin was replaced by Moran as the team's skipper.

Still an active player, he then was traded to the Cincinnati Reds and, ultimately, the New York Giants, where he played his final two seasons in the Majors. He caught 111 shutouts during his career, ranking him 20th all-time among major league catchers.

Dooin died of a heart attack in Rochester, New York at the age of 72, and was buried at Holy Sepulchre Cemetery.

== See also ==
- List of Major League Baseball player–managers
