= 1908 Chicago Cubs season =

Major League Baseball season

1908 Chicago Cubs
- World Series champions National League champions
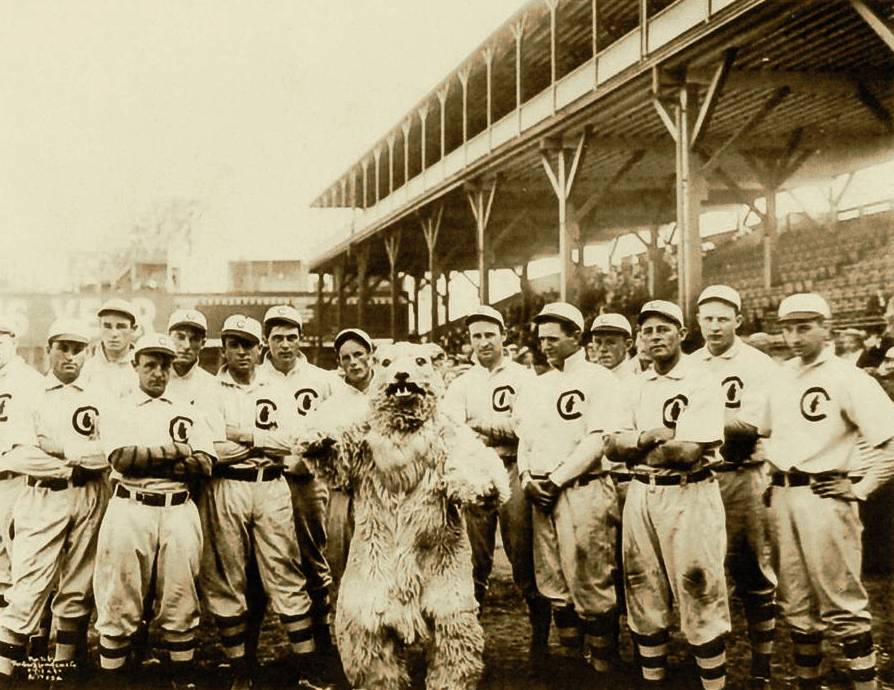
- League: National League
- Ballpark: West Side Park
- City: Chicago, Illinois
- Record: 99–55 (.643)
- League place: 1st
- Owners: Charles Murphy
- Managers: Frank Chance

The 1908 Chicago Cubs season was the 37th season of the Chicago Cubs franchise, the 33rd in the National League, and the 16th at West Side Park. It involved the Cubs winning their third consecutive National League pennant, as well as the World Series for the second consecutive year. They were the first team to repeat as World Series champions. This team included four future Hall of Famers: manager / first baseman Frank Chance, second baseman Johnny Evers, shortstop Joe Tinker, and pitcher Mordecai Brown. In 1908, Brown finished second in the NL in wins and earned run average. This would be the last World Series victory for the Cubs until 2016; it would also take until 2003 – an MLB and North American professional sports record of 95 years – for the Cubs to win their next playoff series.

== Regular season ==
=== Season summary ===
Composite image of post-season eligible players of the 1908 Chicago Cubs.

The Cubs started the season in Cincinnati. Orval Overall was the Cubs' Opening Day starting pitcher. Overall gave up five hits and committed an error in the first inning as the Reds took a 5–0 lead. The Cubs tied the game in the sixth and won the game in the ninth. Cubs pinch hitter Heinie Zimmerman drove in Johnny Evers. Mordecai "Three Finger" Brown pitched in the ninth and got a save for the Cubs.

The home opener was on April 22. Owner Charles Murphy had added several new seats to the stadium. Long-time Cub player-manager Cap Anson threw out the first pitch. Tinker, Evers, and Chance turned their second double play of the season as the Cubs beat the Reds by a score of 7–3.

On June 30, the Pittsburgh Pirates took first place, as the Cubs lost to the Cincinnati Reds. Starting on July 2, the Pirates started a critical five-game series against the Cubs. In the first game, Three Finger Brown threw a six hit, no walk shutout, winning the game 3–0. Brown was 10–1 on the season.

On September 26, starting pitcher Ed Reulbach became the only pitcher in Major League Baseball history to pitch two shutouts on the same day. That day, the Cubs played a doubleheader against the Brooklyn Dodgers. Reulbach pitched both games to completion, which the Cubs won by scores of 5–0 and 3–0.

==== The Merkle Game ====
On Wednesday, September 23, 1908, while playing for the New York Giants in a game against the Cubs, 19-year-old Fred Merkle committed a base-running error that later became known as "Merkle's Boner" and earned him the nickname of "Bonehead."

In the bottom of the 9th inning, Merkle came to bat with two outs and the score tied 1–1. At the time, Moose McCormick was on first base. Merkle singled, and McCormick advanced to third. Al Bridwell followed with another single, and McCormick trotted home to score the apparent winning run. The New York fans in attendance, under the impression that the game was over, ran onto the field to celebrate.

Meanwhile, Merkle, thinking the game was over, ran to the Giants' clubhouse without touching second base (a gesture that was common at the time). Cubs second baseman Johnny Evers noticed this, and after retrieving a ball and touching second base, he appealed to umpire Hank O'Day to call Merkle out. Since Merkle had not touched the base, the umpire called him out on a force play, and McCormick's run did not count. The run was therefore nullified, the Giants' victory erased, and the score of the game remained tied.

Unfortunately, the thousands of fans on the field (as well as the growing darkness in the days before large electric light rigs made night games possible) prevented resumption of the game, and the game was declared a tie. The Giants and the Cubs would end the season tied for first place and would have a rematch at the Polo Grounds on October 8. The Cubs won this makeup game, 4–2, and thus the National League pennant.

=== Season standings ===
National League
Team	W	L	Pct.	GB	Home	Road
Chicago Cubs	99	55	.643	—	47‍–‍30	52‍–‍25
New York Giants	98	56	.636	1	52‍–‍25	46‍–‍31
Pittsburgh Pirates	98	56	.636	1	42‍–‍35	56‍–‍21
Philadelphia Phillies	83	71	.539	16	43‍–‍34	40‍–‍37
Cincinnati Reds	73	81	.474	26	40‍–‍37	33‍–‍44
Boston Doves	63	91	.409	36	35‍–‍42	28‍–‍49
Brooklyn Superbas	53	101	.344	46	27‍–‍50	26‍–‍51
St. Louis Cardinals	49	105	.318	50	28‍–‍49	21‍–‍56

=== Record vs. opponents ===
1908 National League record Sources:
Team	BSN	BRO	CHC	CIN	NYG	PHI	PIT	STL
Boston	—	12–10	6–16–2	8–14	6–16	10–12	7–15	14–8
Brooklyn	10–12	—	4–18	6–16	6–16	5–17	9–13	13–9
Chicago	16–6–2	18–4	—	16–6	11–11–1	9–13–1	10–12	19–3
Cincinnati	14–8	16–6	6–16	—	8–14–1	10–12	8–14	11–11
New York	16–6	16–6	11–11–1	14–8–1	—	16–6	11–11–1	14–8
Philadelphia	12–10	17–5	13–9–1	12–10	6–16	—	9–13	14–8
Pittsburgh	15–7	13–9	12–10	14–8	11–11–1	13–9	—	20–2
St. Louis	8–14	9–13	3–19	11–11	8–14	8–14	2–20	—

=== Notable transactions ===
- May 29, 1908: Doc Marshall was purchased by the Cubs from the St. Louis Cardinals.

=== Roster ===
1908 Chicago Cubs
Roster
Pitchers: Mordecai Brown; Andy Coakley; Chick Fraser; Rube Kroh; Carl Lundgren; Bill Mack; Orval Overall; Jack Pfiester; Ed Reulbach; Carl Spongberg	Catchers: Johnny Kling; Doc Marshall; Pat Moran; Infielders: Frank Chance; Johnny Evers; Harry Steinfeldt; Joe Tinker; Heinie Zimmerman	Outfielders: Blaine Durbin; Jack Hayden; Solly Hofman; Del Howard; Frank Schulte; Jimmy Sheckard; Jimmy Slagle; Other batters: Vin Campbell	Manager: Frank Chance

== Player stats ==
=== Batting ===
==== Starters by position ====
Note: Pos = Position; G = Games played; AB = At bats; H = Hits; Avg. = Batting average; HR = Home runs; RBI = Runs batted in

Pos	Player	G	AB	H	Avg.	HR	RBI
C	Johnny Kling	126	424	117	.276	4	59
1B	Frank Chance	129	452	123	.272	2	55
2B	Johnny Evers	126	416	125	.300	0	37
3B	Harry Steinfeldt	150	539	130	.241	1	62
SS	Joe Tinker	157	548	146	.266	6	68
OF	Jimmy Sheckard	115	403	93	.231	2	22
OF	Frank Schulte	102	386	91	.236	1	43
OF	Jimmy Slagle	104	352	78	.222	0	26

==== Other batters ====
Note: G = Games played; AB = At bats; H = Hits; Avg. = Batting average; HR = Home runs; RBI = Runs batted in

Player	G	AB	H	Avg.	HR	RBI
Solly Hofman	120	411	100	.243	2	42
Del Howard	96	315	88	.279	1	26
Pat Moran	50	150	39	.260	0	12
Heinie Zimmerman	46	113	33	.292	0	9
Jack Hayden	11	45	9	.200	0	2
Blaine Durbin	14	28	7	.250	0	0
Doc Marshall	12	20	6	.300	0	3
Vin Campbell	1	1	0	.000	0	0

=== Pitching ===
==== Starting pitchers ====
Note: G = Games pitched; IP = Innings pitched; W = Wins; L = Losses; ERA = Earned run average; SO = Strikeouts

Player	G	IP	W	L	ERA	SO
Mordecai Brown	44	312.1	29	9	1.47	123
Ed Reulbach	46	297.2	24	7	2.03	133
Jack Pfiester	33	252.0	12	10	2.00	117
Orval Overall	37	225.0	15	11	1.92	167
Chick Fraser	26	162.2	11	9	2.27	66
Carl Lundgren	23	138.2	6	9	4.22	38
Andy Coakley	4	20.1	2	0	0.89	7

==== Other pitchers ====
Note: G = Games pitched; IP = Innings pitched; W = Wins; L = Losses; ERA = Earned run average; SO = Strikeouts

Player	G	IP	W	L	ERA	SO
Rube Kroh	2	12.0	0	0	1.50	11

==== Relief pitchers ====
Note: G = Games pitched; W = Wins; L = Losses; SV = Saves; ERA = Earned run average; SO = Strikeouts

Player	G	W	L	SV	ERA	SO
Bill Mack	2	0	0	0	3.00	2
Karl Spongberg	1	0	0	0	9.00	4

== 1908 World Series ==
NL Chicago Cubs (4) vs AL Detroit Tigers (1)

Game	Score	Date	Location	Attendance
1	Cubs – 10, Tigers – 6	October 10	Bennett Park	10,812
2	Tigers – 1, Cubs – 6	October 11	West Side Park	17,760
3	Tigers – 8, Cubs – 3	October 12	West Side Park	14,543
4	Cubs – 3, Tigers – 0	October 13	Bennett Park	12,907
5	Cubs – 2, Tigers – 0	October 14	Bennett Park	6,210

== Notes ==
=== References ===
- Murphy, Cait (2007). Crazy '08: How a cast of Cranks, Rogues, Boneheads and Magnates created the Greatest Year in Baseball History. Smithsonian Books, a Division of Harper Collins. ISBN 978-0-06-088937-1.
