= 1908 Cincinnati Reds season =

1908 Cincinnati Reds
- League: National League
- Ballpark: Palace of the Fans
- City: Cincinnati
- Record: 73–81 (.474)
- League place: 5th
- Owners: Garry Herrmann
- Managers: John Ganzel

The 1908 Cincinnati Reds season was a season in American baseball. The team finished fifth in the National League with a record of 73–81, 26 games behind the Chicago Cubs.

== Offseason ==
After two straight seasons in which the Reds lost 87 games, the team replaced manager Ned Hanlon with player-manager John Ganzel. This was the first managerial job of Ganzel's career at the major league level.

== Regular season ==
Cincinnati had a new starting shortstop, as Rudy Hulswitt took over the position. Hulswitt had spent the 1907 season with the Columbus Senators of the American Association, where he hit .296 with two home runs, 35 doubles and fourteen triples. He had last played in the major leagues with the Philadelphia Phillies in 1904, where he hit .244 with a homer and 36 RBI.

The Reds' 1906 shortstop, Hans Lobert, moved to third base, while Mike Mowrey came off the bench. Outfielders Dode Paskert and John Kane became starting outfielders as Art Kruger and Fred Odwell joined the Columbus Senators in the American Association. Bob Spade, who was acquired by the Reds late in the 1907 season from the Atlanta Crackers of the Southern Association, was given a regular spot in the starting rotation. Spade was 18–12 with the Crackers in 1907 before going 1–2 with a 1.00 ERA in three starts with Cincinnati in September.

Lobert led the way offensively, hitting a team high .293 with four home runs, 63 RBI, 71 runs scored and 167 hits. Ganzel hit .250 with a homer and 53 RBI, while Miller Huggins hit .239 with no homers and 23 RBI.

Bob Ewing anchored the pitching staff once again, as he was 17–15 with a 2.21 ERA in 37 games. Spade had a solid season, going 17–12 with a 2.74 ERA, while Andy Coakley only had a record of 8–18, however, he led the team with a 1.86 ERA before being traded to the Chicago Cubs late in the season.

=== Season summary ===
The Reds got off to a better start in 1908, and saw themselves in second place with an 18–14 record after thirty-two games, two games behind the Chicago Cubs. A run of 8–3 in their next eleven games saw Cincinnati close the gap to one game, however, the Reds then lost their next five games to fall into third place, five games behind the Cubs. As the season progressed, the Reds continued to drop in the standings, and eventually fall under the .500 mark. At the end of the season, the Reds had a 73–81 record, 26 games behind the first place Cubs. The 73 wins was the highest total by the Reds since winning 79 games in 1905.

=== Season standings ===
National League
Team	W	L	Pct.	GB	Home	Road
Chicago Cubs	99	55	.643	—	47‍–‍30	52‍–‍25
New York Giants	98	56	.636	1	52‍–‍25	46‍–‍31
Pittsburgh Pirates	98	56	.636	1	42‍–‍35	56‍–‍21
Philadelphia Phillies	83	71	.539	16	43‍–‍34	40‍–‍37
Cincinnati Reds	73	81	.474	26	40‍–‍37	33‍–‍44
Boston Doves	63	91	.409	36	35‍–‍42	28‍–‍49
Brooklyn Superbas	53	101	.344	46	27‍–‍50	26‍–‍51
St. Louis Cardinals	49	105	.318	50	28‍–‍49	21‍–‍56

=== Record vs. opponents ===
1908 National League record Sources:
Team	BSN	BRO	CHC	CIN	NYG	PHI	PIT	STL
Boston	—	12–10	6–16–2	8–14	6–16	10–12	7–15	14–8
Brooklyn	10–12	—	4–18	6–16	6–16	5–17	9–13	13–9
Chicago	16–6–2	18–4	—	16–6	11–11–1	9–13–1	10–12	19–3
Cincinnati	14–8	16–6	6–16	—	8–14–1	10–12	8–14	11–11
New York	16–6	16–6	11–11–1	14–8–1	—	16–6	11–11–1	14–8
Philadelphia	12–10	17–5	13–9–1	12–10	6–16	—	9–13	14–8
Pittsburgh	15–7	13–9	12–10	14–8	11–11–1	13–9	—	20–2
St. Louis	8–14	9–13	3–19	11–11	8–14	8–14	2–20	—

=== Notable transactions ===
- July 8, 1908: Bob Spade was claimed off waivers from the Reds by the New York Giants.
- July 10, 1908: Jake Weimer and Dave Brain were traded by the Reds to the New York Giants for Bob Spade and $5,000.

=== Roster ===
1908 Cincinnati Reds
Roster
Pitchers: Billy Campbell; Andy Coakley; Jack Doscher; Jean Dubuc; Bob Ewing; Tom McCarthy; Marty O'Toole; Charlie Rhodes; Jack Rowan; Ralph Savidge; Bert Sincock; Bob Spade; Bill Tozer; Jake Volz; Jake Weimer	Catchers: Larry McLean; Bunny Pearce; Admiral Schlei; Infielders: Dick Egan; John Ganzel; Dick Hoblitzel; Miller Huggins; Rudy Hulswitt; Hans Lobert; Mike Mowrey	Outfielders: Dick Bayless; Bob Bescher; Dave Brain; Bob Coulson; Tom Daley; John Kane; Mike Mitchell; Dode Paskert; Other positions: Bill McGilvray	Manager: John Ganzel

== Player stats ==
=== Batting ===
==== Starters by position ====
Note: Pos = Position; G = Games played; AB = At bats; H = Hits; Avg. = Batting average; HR = Home runs; RBI = Runs batted in

Pos	Player	G	AB	H	Avg.	HR	RBI
C	Admiral Schlei	92	300	66	.220	1	22
1B	John Ganzel	112	388	97	.250	1	53
2B	Miller Huggins	135	498	119	.239	0	23
SS	Rudy Hulswitt	119	386	88	.228	1	28
3B	Hans Lobert	155	570	167	.293	4	63
OF	John Kane	130	455	97	.213	3	23
OF	Dode Paskert	118	395	96	.243	1	36
OF	Mike Mitchell	119	406	90	.222	1	37

==== Other batters ====
Note: G = Games played; AB = At bats; H = Hits; Avg. = Batting average; HR = Home runs; RBI = Runs batted in

Player	G	AB	H	Avg.	HR	RBI
Larry McLean	99	309	67	.217	1	28
Mike Mowrey	77	227	50	.220	0	23
Bob Bescher	32	114	31	.272	0	17
Dick Hoblitzell	32	114	29	.254	0	8
Dick Bayless	19	71	16	.225	1	3
Dick Egan	18	68	14	.206	0	5
Dave Brain	16	55	6	.109	0	1
Tom Daley	14	46	5	.109	0	1
Bob Coulson	8	18	6	.333	0	1
Bunny Pearce	2	2	0	.000	0	0
Bill McGilvray	2	2	0	.000	0	0

=== Pitching ===
==== Starting pitchers ====
Note: G = Games pitched; IP = Innings pitched; W = Wins; L = Losses; ERA = Earned run average; SO = Strikeouts

Player	G	IP	W	L	ERA	SO
Bob Ewing	37	293.2	17	15	2.21	95
Bob Spade	35	249.1	17	12	2.74	74
Andy Coakley	32	242.1	8	18	1.86	61
Billy Campbell	35	221.1	12	13	2.60	73
Jake Weimer	15	116.2	8	7	2.39	36
Jack Rowan	8	49.1	3	3	1.82	24
Tom McCarthy	1	3.2	0	1	9.82	3

==== Other pitchers ====
Note: G = Games pitched; IP = Innings pitched; W = Wins; L = Losses; ERA = Earned run average; SO = Strikeouts

Player	G	IP	W	L	ERA	SO
Jean Dubuc	15	85.1	5	6	2.74	32
Jack Doscher	7	44.1	1	3	1.83	7
Jake Volz	7	22.2	1	2	3.57	6
Ralph Savidge	4	21.0	0	1	2.57	7
Marty O'Toole	3	15.0	1	0	2.40	5

==== Relief pitchers ====
Note: G = Games pitched; W = Wins; L = Losses; SV = Saves; ERA = Earned run average; SO = Strikeouts

Player	G	W	L	SV	ERA	SO
Bill Tozer	4	0	0	0	1.69	5
Bert Sincock	1	0	0	0	3.86	1
Charlie Rhodes	1	0	0	0	0.00	4

== Cuban-American Major League Clubs Series ==
The Reds competed in the inaugural Cuban-American Major League Clubs Series, playing against three teams from the Cuban League. The Almendares club finished with the best record in the series.
