= 1908 Pittsburgh Pirates season =

Baseball season

1908 Pittsburgh Pirates
- League: National League
- Ballpark: Exposition Park
- City: Pittsburgh, Pennsylvania (Note: From 1882-1906, the team played in Allegheny, Pennsylvania, which became annexed by Pittsburgh as the North Side in 1907.)
- Record: 98–56 (.636)
- League place: T–2nd
- Owners: Barney Dreyfuss
- Managers: Fred Clarke

The 1908 Pittsburgh (Note: In the early 20th century and earlier, the name of Pittsburgh was spelled with and without the final 'h'.) Pirates season was the 27th season for the Pittsburgh Pirates franchise. The team finished in a tie for second place in the National League with the New York Giants, one game behind the Chicago Cubs.

== Background ==
The Pirates spent 46 days in first place, and were on top on October 3; however, the team lost its last game to the Cubs, which set up a replay of the infamous "Merkle" game between the Cubs and the Giants. The Cubs took it to win the pennant. Pittsburgh finished tied for second place with the Giants, just one game back. It was one of the closest races in baseball history.

Shortstop Honus Wagner had one of the most dominating hitting performances of all-time. The "Flying Dutchman" led the majors in batting average, on-base percentage, slugging percentage, runs batted in, and stolen bases. He missed the triple crown by two home runs. For his efforts, Wagner was paid $5,000, possibly the most on the team.

== Regular season ==
=== Season summary ===
The Pirates opened the season by winning three straight games in St. Louis. On Opening Day, the Pirates committed four errors while the Cardinals committed six.

Fans were concerned because Honus Wagner, who had led the National League in hitting, slugging, and stolen bases in 1907, was not at the game; many worried that he was taking the year off. On April 17, Charlie Starr, who was Wagner's replacement, committed two errors. After that game, Wagner signed with the Pirates.

The home opener for the Pirates was a 5–1 victory for the Pirates over the Cardinals. From April 26 to May 9, the Pirates played only 3 games due to poor weather.

On June 30, the Pirates took first place, as the Chicago Cubs lost to the Cincinnati Reds.

On July 2, the Pirates began a critical five-game series against the Cubs. During the first game, Mordecai Brown threw a six-hit, no-walk shutout, winning the game 3–0. The Pirates scheduled a doubleheader on the Fourth of July and more than 30,000 fans showed up. The Cubs won the first game 2–0 as Mordecai Brown only allowed two hits.

=== Season standings ===
National League
Team	W	L	Pct.	GB	Home	Road
Chicago Cubs	99	55	.643	—	47‍–‍30	52‍–‍25
New York Giants	98	56	.636	1	52‍–‍25	46‍–‍31
Pittsburgh Pirates	98	56	.636	1	42‍–‍35	56‍–‍21
Philadelphia Phillies	83	71	.539	16	43‍–‍34	40‍–‍37
Cincinnati Reds	73	81	.474	26	40‍–‍37	33‍–‍44
Boston Doves	63	91	.409	36	35‍–‍42	28‍–‍49
Brooklyn Superbas	53	101	.344	46	27‍–‍50	26‍–‍51
St. Louis Cardinals	49	105	.318	50	28‍–‍49	21‍–‍56

=== Record vs. opponents ===
1908 National League record Sources:
Team	BSN	BRO	CHC	CIN	NYG	PHI	PIT	STL
Boston	—	12–10	6–16–2	8–14	6–16	10–12	7–15	14–8
Brooklyn	10–12	—	4–18	6–16	6–16	5–17	9–13	13–9
Chicago	16–6–2	18–4	—	16–6	11–11–1	9–13–1	10–12	19–3
Cincinnati	14–8	16–6	6–16	—	8–14–1	10–12	8–14	11–11
New York	16–6	16–6	11–11–1	14–8–1	—	16–6	11–11–1	14–8
Philadelphia	12–10	17–5	13–9–1	12–10	6–16	—	9–13	14–8
Pittsburgh	15–7	13–9	12–10	14–8	11–11–1	13–9	—	20–2
St. Louis	8–14	9–13	3–19	11–11	8–14	8–14	2–20	—

=== Roster ===
1908 Pittsburgh Pirates
Roster
Pitchers: Chick Brandom; Howie Camnitz; Homer Hillebrand; Sam Leever; Lefty Leifield; Nick Maddox; Tom McCarthy; Deacon Phillippe; Bob Vail; Vic Willis; Harley Young; Irv Young	Catchers: George Gibson; Paddy O'Connor; Ed Phelps; John Sullivan; Infielders: Ed Abbaticchio; Warren Gill; Jim Kane; Tommy Leach; Charlie Starr; Alan Storke; Harry Swacina; Honus Wagner	Outfielders: Beals Becker; Fred Clarke; Danny Moeller; Cy Neighbors; Spike Shannon; Roy Thomas; Chief Wilson; Other batters: Hunky Shaw	Manager: Fred Clarke

== Player stats ==
=== Batting ===
==== Starters by position ====
Note: Pos = Position; G = Games played; AB = At bats; H = Hits; Avg. = Batting average; HR = Home runs; RBI = Runs batted in

Pos	Player	G	AB	H	Avg.	HR	RBI
C	George Gibson	143	486	111	.228	2	45
1B	Harry Swacina	53	176	38	.216	0	13
2B	Ed Abbaticchio	146	500	125	.250	1	61
SS	Honus Wagner	151	568	201	.354	10	109
3B	Tommy Leach	152	583	151	.259	5	41
LF	Fred Clarke	151	551	146	.265	2	35
CF	Roy Thomas	102	386	99	.256	1	24
RF	Chief Wilson	144	529	120	.227	3	43

==== Other batters ====
Note: G = Games played; AB = At bats; H = Hits; Avg. = Batting average; HR = Home runs; RBI = Runs batted in

Player	G	AB	H	Avg.	HR	RBI
Alan Storke	64	202	51	.252	1	12
Jim Kane	55	145	35	.241	0	22
Spike Shannon	32	127	25	.197	0	12
Danny Moeller	36	109	21	.193	0	9
Warren Gill	27	76	17	.224	0	14
Beals Becker	20	65	10	.154	0	0
Ed Phelps	34	64	15	.234	0	11
Charlie Starr	20	59	11	.186	0	8
Paddy O'Connor	12	16	3	.188	0	2
John Sullivan	1	1	0	.000	0	0
Hunky Shaw	1	1	0	.000	0	0
Cy Neighbors	1	0	0	----	0	0

=== Pitching ===
==== Starting pitchers ====
Note: G = Games pitched; IP = Innings pitched; W = Wins; L = Losses; ERA = Earned run average; SO = Strikeouts

Player	G	IP	W	L	ERA	SO
Vic Willis	41	304.2	23	11	2.07	97
Nick Maddox	36	260.2	23	8	2.28	70
Howie Camnitz	38	236.2	16	9	1.56	118
Lefty Leifield	34	218.2	15	14	2.10	87

==== Other pitchers ====
Note: G = Games pitched; IP = Innings pitched; W = Wins; L = Losses; ERA = Earned run average; SO = Strikeouts

Player	G	IP	W	L	ERA	SO
Sam Leever	38	192.2	15	7	2.10	28
Irv Young	16	89.2	4	3	2.01	31
Harley Young	8	48.1	0	2	2.23	17
Chick Brandom	3	17.0	1	0	0.53	8
Bob Vail	4	15.0	1	2	6.00	9
Tom McCarthy	2	6.0	0	0	0.00	1

==== Relief pitchers ====
Note: G = Games pitched; W = Wins; L = Losses; SV = Saves; ERA = Earned run average; SO = Strikeouts

Player	G	IP	W	L	ERA	SO
Deacon Phillippe	5	12.0	0	0	11.25	1
Homer Hillebrand	1	1.0	0	0	0.00	1

== Awards and honors ==
=== League top five finishers ===
Howie Camnitz

- #4 in NL in ERA (1.56)

Fred Clarke

- #4 in NL in runs scored (83)

Tommy Leach

- #3 in NL in runs scored (93)

Honus Wagner

- MLB leader in batting average (.354)
- MLB leader in RBI (109)
- MLB leader in stolen bases (53)
- MLB leader in on-base percentage (.415)
- MLB leader in slugging percentage (.542)
- #2 in NL in home runs (10)
- #2 in NL in runs scored (100)
