= Joe Tinker =

American baseball player and manager (1880–1948)

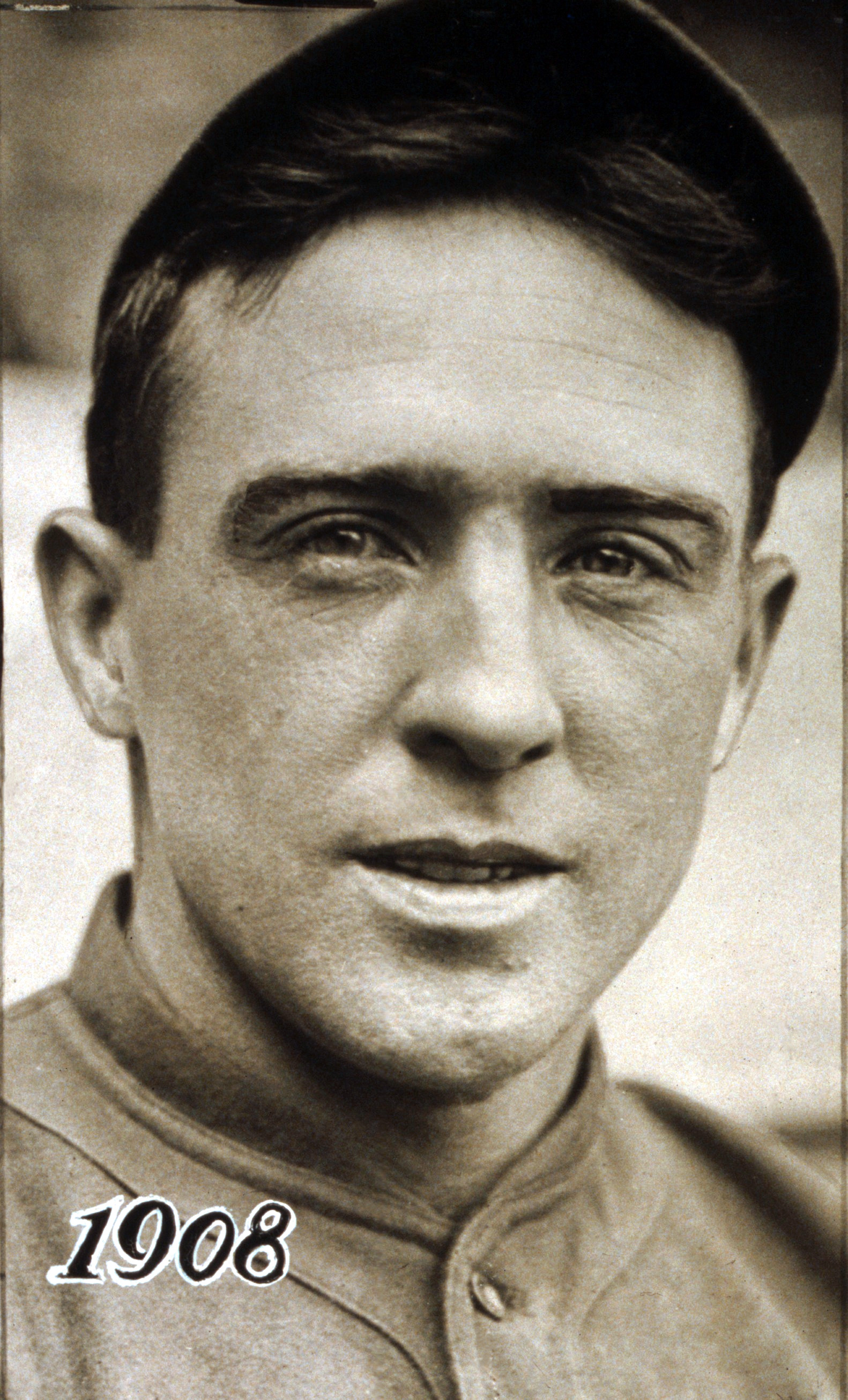
- Tinker with the Chicago Cubs in 1908
- Shortstop / Manager
- Born: July 27, 1880; Muscotah, Kansas, U.S.
- Died: July 27, 1948 (aged 68); Orlando, Florida, U.S.
- Batted: Right Threw: Right

MLB debut
- April 17, 1902, for the Chicago Orphans

Last MLB appearance
- September 22, 1916, for the Chicago Cubs

MLB statistics
- Batting average: .262
- Home runs: 31
- Runs batted in: 782
- Stats at Baseball Reference
- Managerial record at Baseball Reference

Teams
- As player: Chicago Orphans / Cubs (1902–1912); Cincinnati Reds (1913); Chicago Chi-Feds / Whales (1914–1915); Chicago Cubs (1916); As manager: Cincinnati Reds (1913); Chicago Cubs (1916)

Career highlights and awards
- 2× World Series champion (1907, 1908); Federal League champion (1915); Chicago Cubs Hall of Fame

Member of the National

Baseball Hall of Fame
- Induction: 1946
- Election method: Old-Timers Committee

Joseph Bert Tinker (July 27, 1880 – July 27, 1948) was an American professional baseball player and manager. He played from 1902 through 1916 for the Chicago Cubs and Cincinnati Reds of Major League Baseball (MLB) and the Chicago Whales of the Federal League.

Born in Muscotah, Kansas, Tinker began playing semi-professional baseball in Kansas in the late 19th century, first in Kansas City, then in Parsons. He began his professional career in 1900 in minor league baseball, initially in Denver then with Portland in the Northwestern League. He made his MLB debut with the Cubs in 1902. Tinker was a member of the Chicago Cubs dynasty that won four pennants and two World Series championships between 1906 and 1910. After playing one season with Cincinnati in 1913, he became one of the first stars to jump to the upstart Federal League in 1914. After leading the Whales to the pennant in 1915, he returned to the Cubs as their player-manager in 1916, his final season in MLB.

Tinker returned to minor league baseball as a part-owner and manager for the Columbus Senators before moving to Orlando, Florida, to manage the Orlando Tigers. While in Orlando, Tinker developed a real estate firm, which thrived during the Florida land boom of the 1920s. However, the 1926 Miami hurricane and Great Depression cost Tinker most of his fortune, and he returned to professional baseball in the late 1930s.

With the Cubs, Tinker was a part of a great double-play combination with teammates Johnny Evers and Frank Chance that was immortalized as "Tinker-to-Evers-to-Chance" in the poem "Baseball's Sad Lexicon". However, Evers and Tinker feuded off the field. Tinker was elected to the National Baseball Hall of Fame in 1946, the same year as Evers and Chance. He has also been honored by the Florida State League and the city of Orlando.

== Early life ==
Tinker was born in Muscotah, Kansas, on July 27, 1880. His twin sister died at a young age. When Tinker was two, his family moved to Kansas City, Kansas. There, he began to play baseball for his school's team when he was 14 years old. He played in semi-professional baseball for Hagen's Tailors in 1898, winning the city championship. In 1899, he played for a team based in Parsons, Kansas, until it disbanded. He then joined a team representing Coffeyville, Kansas, as a third baseman, for the remainder of the year.

Tinker started his professional baseball career in 1900, at the age of 19, when Billy Hulen, a teammate of Tinker's with the Coffeyville squad, recommended him to George Tebeau, the manager of the Denver Grizzlies of the Western League. Playing as a second baseman for Denver, Tinker batted .219 in his first 32 games. Tebeau sold Tinker to the Great Falls Indians of the Montana State League in June. Great Falls sold Tinker to the Helena Senators, also in the Montana State League, for $200 later in the season due to the team's financial insolvency.

In 1901, Tinker batted .290 for the Portland Webfoots of the Pacific Northwest League as their third baseman. He led the league with 37 stolen bases. Receiving interest from the Chicago Cubs and the Cincinnati Reds of the National League (NL), Tinker decided on the Cubs when teammate Jack McCarthy told him that he felt mistreated from his time with the Reds.

== Major league career ==
=== Chicago Cubs ===
When he purchased Tinker's contract, Cubs manager Frank Selee was seeking a replacement at shortstop for Barry McCormick, who had joined the St. Louis Browns of the rival American League. Tinker won the job during spring training. As a rookie in 1902, Tinker batted .261, but also led NL shortstops with 72 errors. Johnny Evers, also a rookie, played second base for the Cubs. With Frank Chance, the team's first baseman, the trio first played together on September 13, 1902, and collaborated on their first double play on September 15.

In the 1903 season, Tinker's batting average improved to .291, and he also contributed 70 RBIs. Tinker led all NL shortstops in the 1906 season with a .944 fielding percentage. On September 14, 1905, Tinker and Evers engaged in a fistfight on the field because Evers had taken a cab to the stadium and left his teammates behind in the hotel lobby. They did not speak for years following this event.

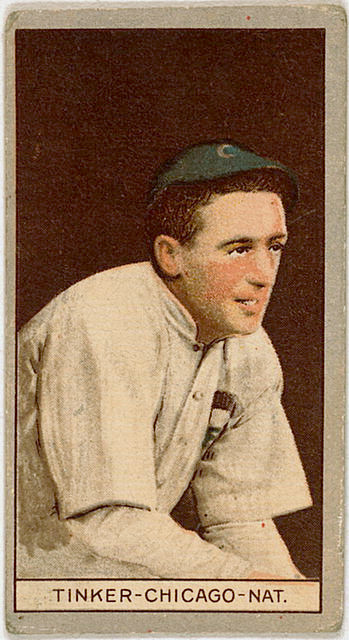
Joe Tinker baseball card, 1912

Tinker led all shortstops in the NL in double plays turned in the 1905 season. Led by Tinker, Evers and Chance, the Cubs had a 116–36 win–loss record in the 1906 season, a record for victories that only was matched by the Seattle Mariners in the 2001 season, in which the Mariners played ten more games than the 1906 Cubs. Tinker batted .167 in the 1906 World Series as the Chicago White Sox defeated the Cubs in six games. Prior to the 1907 season, Tinker underwent surgery for appendicitis. Tinker batted only .154 in the 1907 World Series, but the Cubs defeated the Detroit Tigers in five games.

In the 1908 season, Tinker played all 157 games on the Cubs' schedule. In addition to batting .266, he led the team with 146 hits, six home runs, 14 triples, and a .391 slugging percentage. He also led the league with 570 assists. In the game characterized by Merkle's Boner, Tinker hit an inside-the-park home run against Christy Mathewson of the New York Giants, prior to Fred Merkle's baserunning gaffe. In the 1908 NL playoff game, which was a replay of the Merkle game, Tinker hit a leadoff triple off of Mathewson in the third inning, which ignited a four-run rally that helped Chicago to clinch the pennant. Tinker then batted .263 as the Cubs defeated the Tigers in the 1908 World Series in five games. Tinker also hit a home run off of Bill Donovan, the first home run hit in a World Series following the 1905 rules agreement.

In 1909, Tinker, who earned $1,500, demanded a $2,500 salary. He accepted a $200 raise. The Cubs reached the 1910 World Series, and though Tinker batted .333 in the series, the Cubs lost to the Philadelphia Athletics in five games. Following the 1910 season, Tinker threatened to quit the Cubs and play baseball in Australia over a salary dispute.

Tinker led the NL with 486 assists in the 1911 season and led all shortstops in putouts with 333. In August 1911, Chance suspended Tinker for the remainder of the season for using profanity, though he was reinstated two days later.

Garry Herrmann, the owner of the Reds, identified Tinker as an ideal candidate to become his player-manager for the 1912 season. According to Tinker, shareholders of the Reds approached Tinker about his interest in the job, and he then met with Charles W. Murphy, the Cubs' owner, and Chance, then serving as the Cubs' manager. They forbade him to take the role with Cincinnati, which left Tinker unhappy. Herrmann began to listen to entreaties from his players, who wanted to retain Clark Griffith as manager, but decided to hire Hank O'Day. In the 1912 season, Tinker had a .282 batting average, and scored 80 runs and recorded 75 RBIs, both career records. He again led the league in putouts by a shortstop, with 354. Tinker finished in fourth place in the Chalmers Award voting following the season, behind Larry Doyle, Honus Wagner, and Chief Meyers.

=== Cincinnati Reds ===
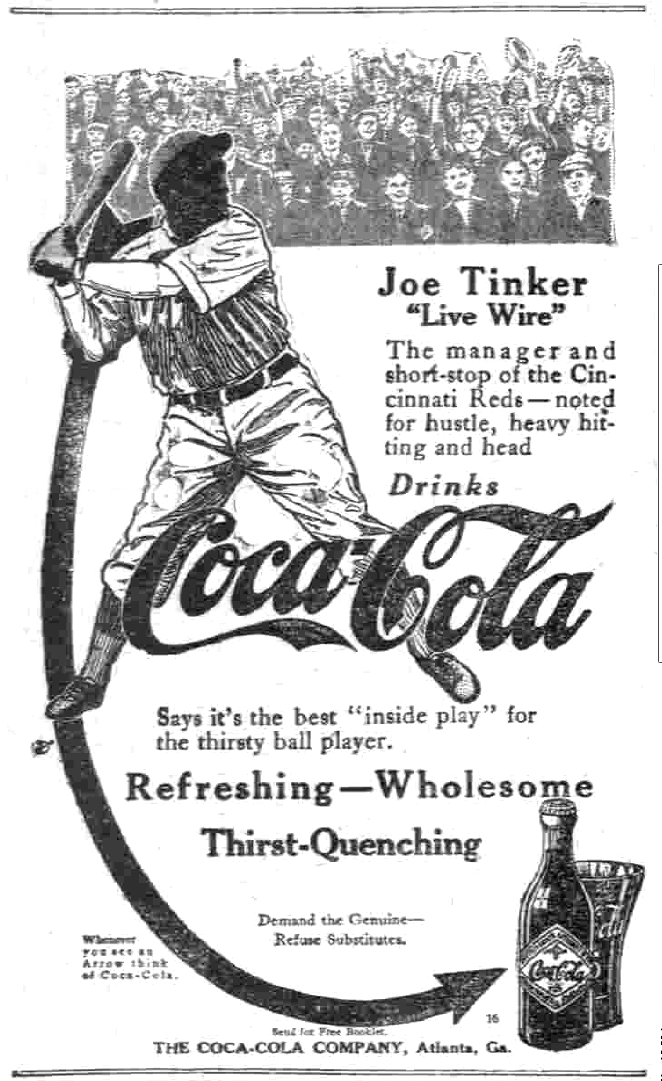
Joe Tinker in a Coca-Cola ad from 1913

Murphy named Evers the new manager of the Cubs for the 1913 season. Tinker did not want to play for Evers and met with Murphy and Evers to discuss his transfer to the Reds. Murphy was unhappy with Tinker's high salary demands, which led him to agree to trade Tinker to the Cincinnati Reds in December 1912. The Reds received Tinker, Harry Chapman and Grover Lowdermilk in exchange for Red Corriden, Bert Humphries, Pete Knisely, Mike Mitchell, and Art Phelan. He signed a contract for an undisclosed salary.

Tinker missed several weeks during the 1913 season when he gave blood for his wife's blood transfusion. Tinker finished the season with a .317 batting average, .445 slugging percentage, and a .968 fielding percentage, all career highs, in 110 games. However, the Reds as a team struggled, finishing the season with a 64–89 win–loss record. Due to the Reds' struggles, Herrmann challenged Tinker's managerial style and sought his resignation. Tinker refused to resign.

=== Chicago Whales and Cubs ===
In October 1913, Tinker and Herrmann conferred, leading to Tinker signing a contract to remain the Reds manager for the 1914 season. However, Herrmann fired Tinker in November, leaving him to seek a contract from another team. Tinker complained that Herrmann did not seek his input on player transactions, while Herrmann charged that Tinker did not accept his authority.

Charles Ebbets, owner of the Brooklyn Dodgers, viewed Tinker as a good replacement for the released Bob Fisher, their shortstop in 1913. The Cubs, Giants, Pittsburgh Pirates, and Philadelphia Phillies were also interested in acquiring Tinker. Ebbets secured Tinker's release from the Reds for $15,000, with another $10,000 to be paid to Tinker. The teams also agreed to swap players, with Earl Yingling and Herbie Moran going to Cincinnati and Dick Egan joining Brooklyn. Ebbets entered contract negotiations with Tinker.

However, Tinker never received the $10,000 promised to him by Ebbets. He insisted on a $10,000 salary for the 1914 season, higher than the $5,000 Brooklyn was willing to pay. Tinker was willing to accept a three-year contract if it paid $7,500 per season. Tinker decided to jump to the Federal League rather than sign with Brooklyn, signing a three-year contract worth $36,000. He was considered the first "star" player to jump to the Federal League, though he signed with the Federal League the same day as Mordecai Brown.

Joining the Chicago Federals (later known as the Whales) in the Federal League, Tinker served as player-manager. In his role, he signed other major league players to the Federal League, though he could not lure American League pitchers Walter Johnson from the Washington Senators or Smoky Joe Wood from the Boston Red Sox. The Whales drew more fans than the Cubs in those two seasons. The Whales finished in second place in 1914, with Tinker batting .259 despite suffering a broken rib during the season. Tinker tore a muscle in May 1915, ending his season prematurely. With Tinker managing, the Whales won the pennant in 1915. However, the league folded after the 1915 season.

Charles Weeghman, the owner of the Whales, purchased the Cubs and consolidated his two Chicago rosters, retaining Tinker as his manager. Due to the high combined salaries of the Cubs and Whales, which included Brown and Roger Bresnahan, Tinker was tasked with releasing extraneous players from their contracts. He served as the player-manager of the Cubs for the 1916 season.

=== Career summary ===
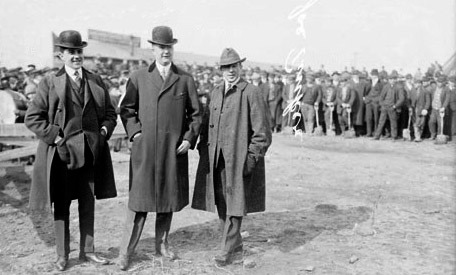
Charles Weeghman (left), James A. Gilmore (center), and Tinker (right) at the groundbreaking ceremony for Weeghman Park in 1914

Tinker was the starting shortstop for the Chicago Cubs from 1902 to 1912. He was a speedy runner, stealing an average of 28 bases a season and even stealing home twice in one game on July 28, 1910. He also excelled at fielding, often leading the National League in a number of statistical categories (including four times in fielding percentage). During his decade with the Cubs, they went to the World Series four times, winning in 1907 and 1908.

Despite being just an average hitter, batting .268 for his career in an era of high batting averages, Tinker had a good amount of success against fellow Hall of Famer Christy Mathewson, batting .350 against the Hall of Fame pitcher over his career. In Mathewson's 1912 book, Pitching in a Pinch, he referred to Tinker as "the worst man I have to face in the National League."

Tinker is perhaps best known for the "Tinker to Evers to Chance" double play combination in the poem "Baseball's Sad Lexicon", written by the New York Evening Mail newspaper columnist Franklin Pierce Adams in July 1910. The poem was written as a lamentation from the perspective of a New York Giants fan on how the team is consistently defeated by the Chicago Cubs.

Tinker was also noted as a fighter. In addition to fighting Evers, Tinker defeated Egan in a fight after a game and fought Rabbit Maranville during a game. In 1908, he was arrested for assault when he got into a fight with a fan at a saloon he owned. He was acquitted of the charge.

== Later life ==
In December 1916, Tinker became part-owner of the Columbus Senators of the American Association, with Thomas E. Wilson serving as the principal owner. The duo paid $65,000 for 75% ownership of the team. Tinker also served as the team's manager. He allowed Grover Hartley to succeed him as manager in 1919 and chose Bill Clymer to manage the team for the 1920 season, leading Hartley to request a trade.

Tinker's wife continued to suffer through poor health, so Tinker sold his interest in the Columbus team after the 1920 season and moved to Orlando, Florida. Tinker became owner and manager of the Orlando Tigers of the Florida State League. The team became known as the "Tinker Tigers" and won the league's championship. Tinker also scouted for the Reds. Tinker's wife committed suicide on Christmas Day, 1923, with a revolver during an apparent nervous breakdown. He remarried in 1926, to Mary Ross Eddington of Orlando. Jack Hendricks of the Reds served as Tinker's best man. He married his third wife, Susanna Margaret Chabot, in 1942.

Tinker ended his involvement in professional baseball, focusing instead on his real estate ventures during the Florida land boom of the 1920s. He developed a successful real estate firm, buying and selling land in Orange County and Seminole County. He purchased the Longwood Hotel, now listed on the National Register of Historic Places, in 1926. Tinker convinced Reds owner Garry Herrmann to use his stadium in Orlando for their spring training site in 1923.

Tinker made up to $250,000 in his real estate business. However, his fortunes began to change in 1926, when the stock market receded and the 1926 Miami hurricane damaged significant areas of South Florida. During the Great Depression, he was forced to liquidate most of his real estate holdings. Tinker owned a billiard parlor during the Depression. He opened one of Orlando's first bars after the end of Prohibition. He also returned to baseball. Tinker scouted the Philadelphia Athletics' hitters for the Cubs prior to the 1929 World Series.

During the 1930 season, Tinker returned to baseball as a coach for the Buffalo Bisons of the International League, who were managed by Clymer. Tinker became the manager of the Jersey City Skeeters of the International League after the dismissal of Nick Allen in August. The owner of the Springfield Ponies of the Eastern League attempted to convince Tinker to manage his team in 1931. Tinker assumed managerial duties for the Orlando Gulls in mid-May 1937, succeeding Nelson Leach. However, he resigned the position in July of that year, as the team was unable to pay his salary. During World War II, Tinker worked at Orlando Air Force Base as a boiler inspector.

According to some tellings, Tinker and Evers did not speak to one another again following their fight for 33 years, until they were asked to participate in the radio broadcast of the 1938 World Series, played between the Cubs and the New York Yankees. Neither Tinker nor Evers knew the other had been invited. However, in 1929, Tinker joined with Evers in signing a 10-week contract to perform a theatrical skit on baseball in different cities across the United States.

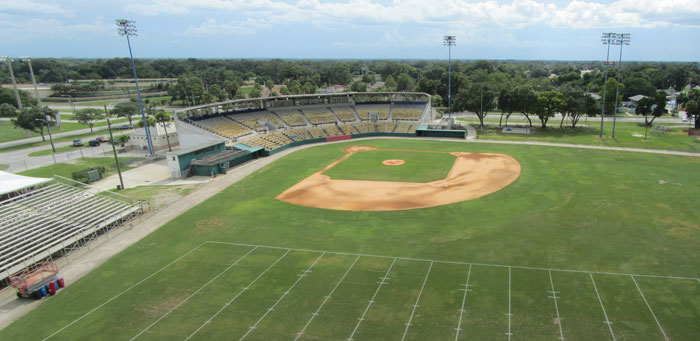
Tinker Field in Orlando, Florida

Tinker had serious health problems in his later life. Complications of diabetes mellitus and Bright's disease left Tinker near death in 1936, when his physician believed he had 24 hours to live, and 1944, when he was placed in an oxygen tent. However, he returned to health and scouted minor league players for the Boston Braves in 1946. Tinker developed an infection relating to diabetes that in 1947 required the amputation of a toe and persisted until his left leg above the knee was amputated as well. Tinker died at Orange Memorial Hospital in Orlando on July 27, 1948, his 68th birthday, of complications from diabetes. He was buried in Greenwood Cemetery and survived by his four children.

== Honors ==
Tinker was elected into the National Baseball Hall of Fame in 1946. Evers and Chance were inducted that same year. Local leaders in Orlando held a testimonial dinner in his honor in 1947.

Tinker Field, a former stadium once in the shadow of Camping World Stadium (previously known as the Citrus Bowl), and the Tinker Building, Tinker's office in Orlando, are on the National Register of Historic Places. Tinker was posthumously inducted into the Florida State League Hall of Fame in 2009, in its inaugural class.

== See also ==
- List of members of the Baseball Hall of Fame
- List of Major League Baseball career triples leaders
- List of Major League Baseball career stolen bases leaders
- List of Major League Baseball player-managers
