= 1908 New York Giants season =

1908 New York Giants
- League: National League
- Ballpark: Polo Grounds
- City: New York City
- Record: 98–56 (.636)
- League place: T–2nd
- Owners: John T. Brush
- Managers: John McGraw

The 1908 New York Giants season was the 26th season of the franchise. The team finished in second place in the National League with a 98–56 record, one game behind the Chicago Cubs.

Paced by Turkey Mike Donlin, the offense scored the most runs in the league. Donlin led the team in nearly all batting categories and was second in batting to Honus Wagner.

Giants' pitching shut out the opposition 25 times, a franchise record for 1901 onwards. Future Hall of Famer Christy Mathewson earned the pitching triple crown with 37 wins, 259 strikeouts, and a 1.43 ERA. However, he lost the last game of the season to Three Finger Brown of the Chicago Cubs, and the Giants finished one game back in the pennant race.

That one-game playoff became necessary after Giants rookie Fred Merkle failed to touch second base at the end of a previous contest, costing them a win. In addition, they were beaten by another rookie, Phillies pitcher Harry Coveleski, three times in five days late in the season. Coveleski was subsequently nicknamed "The Giant Killer".

== Regular season ==
=== Season summary ===
The Giants opened the season on the road with a 3–1 victory over the Philadelphia Phillies. The Giants took five of their first six games of the season. The home opener at the Polo Grounds was the biggest in club history, as the Giants attracted over 25,000 fans. The Brooklyn Superbas took a 2–1 lead into the bottom of the ninth. Fred Merkle pinch hit for Christy Mathewson and got a ground rule double. Merkle safely advanced to third base on a sacrifice bunt. Fred Tenney hit a grounder and Merkle was caught off third. Captain Donlin hit a two-run home run over the right field wall to win the home opener for the Giants by a score of 3–2.

On July 4, Hooks Wiltse had a perfect game heading into the ninth inning. With two out in the ninth, the perfect game was still intact. George McQuillan was hit by a pitch and Wiltse lost the perfect game. on August 27, the Giants won 18 of their last 23 (including four in a row versus the Pittsburgh Pirates) to take the lead in the National League for the first time since April. During the Giants four-game sweep of the Pirates in late August, the electric scoreboard made its debut in New York. The first electric scoreboard was outside Madison Square Garden, and there was another near the Gotham Theatre on 125th Street.

==== The Merkle Game ====
On Wednesday, September 23, against the Chicago Cubs, 19-year-old Fred Merkle committed a base running error that later became known as "Merkle's Boner", and earned Merkle the nickname of "Bonehead."

In the bottom of the 9th inning, he came up to bat with two outs, and the score tied 1–1. At the time, Moose McCormick was on first base. Merkle singled, and McCormick advanced to third. Al Bridwell, the next batter, followed with a single of his own. McCormick went home, apparently scoring the winning run of the game. The fans in attendance, under the impression that the game was over, ran onto the field to celebrate.

Meanwhile, Merkle, trying to escape the mob of people, ran to the Giants' clubhouse without touching second base. Cubs second baseman Johnny Evers noticed this, and after retrieving a ball and touching second base, he appealed to umpire Hank O'Day to call Merkle out. The validity of the ball was disputed – numerous accounts have Giants pitcher Joe McGinnity intercepting the real ball before Evers could get it. However, since Merkle had not touched the base, the umpire called him out on a force play, and McCormick's run did not count.

Since the run was nullified, the Giants' victory was erased, and the score of the game remained tied. Unfortunately, the thousands of fans on the field (as well as the growing darkness in the days before large electric light rigs made night games possible) prevented resumption of the game, and it was declared a tie. The Giants and the Cubs would end the season deadlocked atop the standings and would have a rematch at the Polo Grounds, on October 8. The Cubs won this makeup game, 4–2, and thus the National League pennant.

Giants manager John McGraw never blamed Merkle for the second-place finish. However, the rookie was hounded by the New York press and fans for years thereafter.

=== Season standings ===
National League
Team	W	L	Pct.	GB	Home	Road
Chicago Cubs	99	55	.643	—	47‍–‍30	52‍–‍25
New York Giants	98	56	.636	1	52‍–‍25	46‍–‍31
Pittsburgh Pirates	98	56	.636	1	42‍–‍35	56‍–‍21
Philadelphia Phillies	83	71	.539	16	43‍–‍34	40‍–‍37
Cincinnati Reds	73	81	.474	26	40‍–‍37	33‍–‍44
Boston Doves	63	91	.409	36	35‍–‍42	28‍–‍49
Brooklyn Superbas	53	101	.344	46	27‍–‍50	26‍–‍51
St. Louis Cardinals	49	105	.318	50	28‍–‍49	21‍–‍56

=== Record vs. opponents ===
1908 National League record Sources:
Team	BSN	BRO	CHC	CIN	NYG	PHI	PIT	STL
Boston	—	12–10	6–16–2	8–14	6–16	10–12	7–15	14–8
Brooklyn	10–12	—	4–18	6–16	6–16	5–17	9–13	13–9
Chicago	16–6–2	18–4	—	16–6	11–11–1	9–13–1	10–12	19–3
Cincinnati	14–8	16–6	6–16	—	8–14–1	10–12	8–14	11–11
New York	16–6	16–6	11–11–1	14–8–1	—	16–6	11–11–1	14–8
Philadelphia	12–10	17–5	13–9–1	12–10	6–16	—	9–13	14–8
Pittsburgh	15–7	13–9	12–10	14–8	11–11–1	13–9	—	20–2
St. Louis	8–14	9–13	3–19	11–11	8–14	8–14	2–20	—

=== Notable transactions ===
- July 8, 1908: Bob Spade was claimed off waivers by the Giants from the Cincinnati Reds.
- July 10, 1908: Bob Spade and $5,000 were traded by the Giants to the Cincinnati Reds for Jake Weimer and Dave Brain.

=== Roster ===
1908 New York Giants
Roster
Pitchers: Red Ames; Roy Beecher; Doc Crandall; Bull Durham; Bill Malarkey; Rube Marquard; Christy Mathewson; Joe McGinnity; Dummy Taylor; Hooks Wiltse	Catchers: Roger Bresnahan; Tom Needham; Fred Snodgrass; Art Wilson; Infielders: Dave Brain; Al Bridwell; Art Devlin; Larry Doyle; Buck Herzog; Fred Merkle; Sammy Strang; Fred Tenney	Outfielders: Shad Barry; Josh Devore; Mike Donlin; Steve Evans; Jack Hannifin; Moose McCormick; Cy Seymour; Spike Shannon	Manager: John McGraw

== Player stats ==
=== Batting ===
==== Starters by position ====
Note: Pos = Position; G = Games played; AB = At bats; H = Hits; Avg. = Batting average; HR = Home runs; RBI = Runs batted in

Pos	Player	G	AB	H	Avg.	HR	RBI
C	Roger Bresnahan	140	449	127	.283	1	54
1B	Fred Tenney	156	583	149	.256	1	49
2B	Larry Doyle	104	377	116	.308	0	33
3B	Art Devlin	157	534	135	.253	2	45
SS	Al Bridwell	147	467	133	.285	0	46
OF	Cy Seymour	156	587	157	.267	5	92
OF	Spike Shannon	77	268	60	.224	1	21
OF	Mike Donlin	155	593	198	.334	6	106

==== Other batters ====
Note: G = Games played; AB = At bats; H = Hits; Avg. = Batting average; HR = Home runs; RBI = Runs batted in

Player	G	AB	H	Avg.	HR	RBI
Moose McCormick	73	252	76	.302	0	32
Buck Herzog	64	160	48	.300	0	11
Tom Needham	54	91	19	.209	0	11
Shad Barry	37	67	10	.149	0	5
Sammy Strang	28	53	5	.094	0	2
Fred Merkle	38	41	11	.268	1	7
Dave Brain	11	17	3	.176	0	1
Josh Devore	5	6	1	.167	0	2
Fred Snodgrass	6	4	1	.250	0	1
Steve Evans	2	2	1	.500	0	0
Jack Hannifin	2	2	0	.000	0	0
Art Wilson	1	0	0	----	0	0

=== Pitching ===
==== Starting pitchers ====
Note: G = Games pitched; IP = Innings pitched; W = Wins; L = Losses; ERA = Earned run average; SO = Strikeouts

Player	G	IP	W	L	ERA	SO
Christy Mathewson	56	390.2	37	11	1.43	259
Hooks Wiltse	44	330.0	23	14	2.24	118
Doc Crandall	32	214.2	12	12	2.93	77
Red Ames	18	114.1	7	4	1.81	81
Rube Marquard	1	5.0	0	1	3.60	2

==== Other pitchers ====
Note: G = Games pitched; IP = Innings pitched; W = Wins; L = Losses; ERA = Earned run average; SO = Strikeouts

Player	G	IP	W	L	ERA	SO
Joe McGinnity	37	186.0	11	7	2.27	55
Dummy Taylor	27	127.2	8	5	2.33	50

==== Relief pitchers ====
Note: G = Games pitched; W = Wins; L = Losses; SV = Saves; ERA = Earned run average; SO = Strikeouts

Player	G	W	L	SV	ERA	SO
Bill Malarkey	15	0	2	2	2.57	12
Roy Beecher	2	0	0	1	7.94	0
Bull Durham	1	0	0	0	9.00	2

== Awards and honors ==
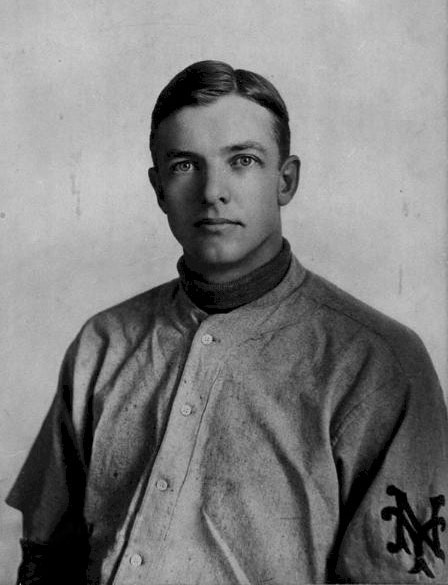
"The Big Six": Christy Mathewson

=== League top five finishers ===
Roger Bresnahan

- #3 in NL in on-base percentage (.401)

Mike Donlin

- #2 in NL in batting average (.334)
- #2 in NL in RBI (106)
- #2 in NL in slugging percentage (.452)

Larry Doyle

- #3 in NL in batting average (.308)

Christy Mathewson

- NL leader in wins (37)
- NL leader in strikeouts (259)
- NL leader in shutouts (11)
- NL leader in ERA (1.43)

Cy Seymour

- #3 in NL in RBI (92)

Fred Tenney

- NL leader in runs scored (101)
