= Merkle's Boner =

Baserunning mistake in a 1908 baseball game

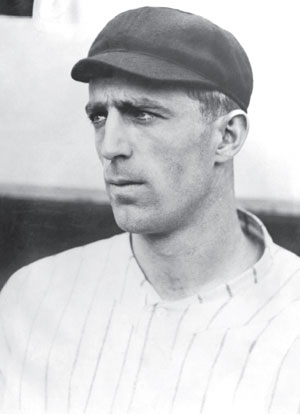
Fred Merkle

Merkle's Boner refers to the notorious base-running mistake committed by rookie Fred Merkle of the New York Giants in a game against the Chicago Cubs on September 23, 1908. Merkle's failure to advance to second base on what should have been a game-winning hit led instead to a force play at second and a tied game. The Cubs later won the makeup game, which proved decisive as they beat the Giants by one game to win the National League (NL) pennant for 1908. It has been described as "the most controversial game in baseball history".

== Background ==
The NL pennant race of 1908 was a three-way fight among the teams that dominated the league in the first decade of the modern era: the Pittsburgh Pirates (pennant winners in 1901, 1902, and 1903), the Giants (winners in 1904 and 1905), and the Cubs (winners in 1906 and 1907). The teams were clustered in the standings all year, with Pittsburgh never more than 2.5 games ahead or 5 games behind, the Giants never more than 4.5 ahead or 6.5 behind, and the Cubs never more than 4 ahead or 6 behind. When play began at the Polo Grounds in New York City on September 23, 1908, the Cubs and Giants were tied for first place, although the Giants had six more games to play, with an 87–50 record as opposed to the Cubs' 90–53). The Pirates were 1.5 games behind with an 88–54 record.

Merkle was 19 years old in 1908, the youngest player in the National League. He played in only 38 games all year, 11 of which were at first base as the backup for regular Giants first baseman Fred Tenney. Merkle was recovering from two foot surgeries in July, following a blood infection that nearly caused his foot to be amputated, and was unable to play for most of July and August. On the morning of September 23, Tenney woke up with a case of lumbago, and Giants manager John McGraw penciled Merkle in at first base. Merkle had started at first base the previous year 14 times and at second base once this season, but this was his first start at first base this season.

== The game ==
September 23, 1908 at Polo Grounds, New York City, New York
Team	1	2	3	4	5	6	7	8	9	R	H	E
Chicago Cubs	0	0	0	1	0	0	0	0	0	1	5	3
New York Giants	0	0	0	0	1	0	0	0	0	1	6	0
Home runs: CHC: Joe Tinker; NYG: None; Attendance: 20,000 (Time: 1:30); Umpires: Hank O'Day, Bob Emslie; Boxscore

Future Hall of Fame member Christy Mathewson started for the Giants, while Jack Pfiester started for the Cubs. As was customary at the time, the game had two umpires: Bob Emslie on the basepaths and Hank O'Day behind the plate.

The Giants were the home team. Neither Mathewson nor Pfiester allowed a run through three innings. In the fourth, Cubs shortstop Joe Tinker hit the ball into the outfield, and when right fielder Mike Donlin could not stop it from going past him deep into the cavernous outfield of the Polo Grounds, Tinker circled the bases for an inside-the-park home run that gave Chicago a 1–0 lead. It was the first home run hit off Mathewson since one by Tinker on July 17. The Giants tied the score in the fifth when Buck Herzog singled, advanced to second on an error, advanced to third on a sacrifice by Roger Bresnahan, and scored on a single by Donlin. The game was still tied 1–1 when the Giants came to bat in the bottom of the ninth.

== The boner ==
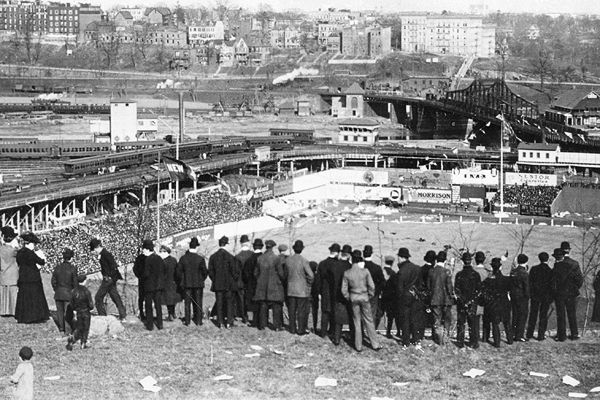
An estimated 20,000 fans watched the game.

Pfiester remained on the mound for Chicago. Cy Seymour led off with a groundout to second. Art Devlin singled, putting the winning run on first base with one out. Moose McCormick grounded sharply to second and Devlin was forced out, but Devlin's aggressive slide prevented a double play and allowed McCormick to reach first base safely on a fielder's choice. With two outs and McCormick on first, Fred Merkle came up to bat. Merkle, who only had 47 plate appearances in the entire 1908 season, singled down the right-field line. McCormick, the potential winning run, advanced to third base.

Shortstop Al Bridwell came up to bat next with two outs and runners at the corners. Bridwell swung at the first pitch from Pfiester, a fastball, and drilled an apparent single into center field. McCormick ran home from third, and the game appeared to be over, a 2–1 Giants victory. Giants fans poured out of the stands and mobbed the field; fans sitting behind home plate crossed the field (customary in this era) to exit the ballpark via the outfield. Merkle, advancing from first base, saw the fans swarming onto the playing field. He turned back to the dugout without ever touching second. Official rule 5.08(a) states: "A run is not scored if the runner advances to home base during a play in which the third out is made [...] by any runner being forced out".

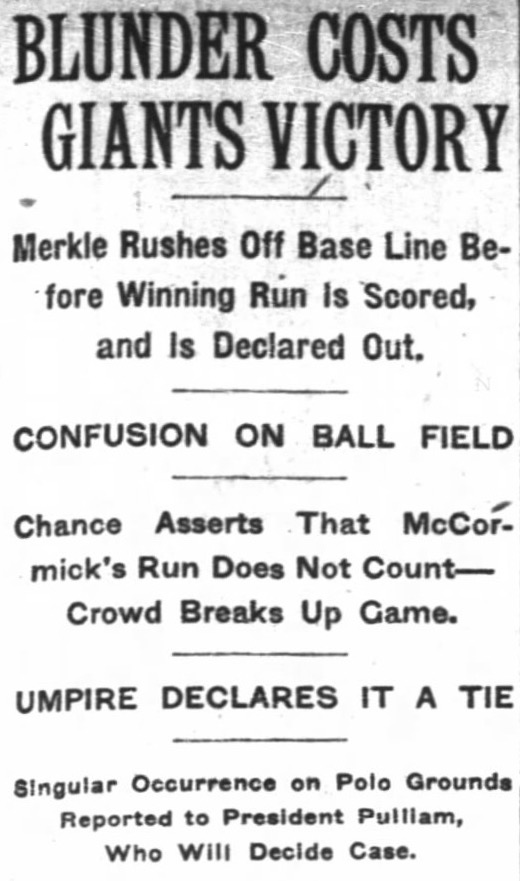
Story headline in The New York Times

Cubs second baseman Johnny Evers saw an opportunity to have the rule enforced. He shouted to center fielder Solly Hofman, who, though the field was filled with fans, retrieved the ball and threw it to Evers. According to one account, Joe McGinnity, a Giants pitcher who was coaching first base that day, intercepted the ball and threw it away into the crowd of fans. Evers apparently retrieved the ball and touched second base, although some reports stated that he substituted a different ball. Umpires Emslie and O'Day hurriedly consulted, and O'Day, who saw the play from home plate, ruled that Merkle had not touched second base; on that basis, Emslie ruled him out on a force, and O'Day ruled that the run did not score. The fans who had run onto the field were so hostile to O'Day that police officers rushed into the crowd to protect him.

Newspapers told different stories of who had gotten the ball to Evers and how. One newspaper claimed that Cub players physically restrained Merkle from advancing to second. The New York Times game recap the next day stated that it was Cubs manager/first baseman Frank Chance, not Evers, who had realized the situation and called for the ball to be thrown to second base, with Chance running to second base to receive the throw. This account also intimated that the ball may not have been successfully retrieved from the crowd after McGinnity's interference and stated that Merkle insisted that he had indeed touched second base. Retelling the story in 1944, Evers insisted that after McGinnity (who was not playing in the game) had thrown the ball away, Cubs pitcher Rube Kroh (who also was not in the game) retrieved it from a fan and threw it to shortstop Tinker, who threw it to Evers (by rule, after a fan or a player who was not in the game touches the ball, it becomes dead). A contemporary account from the Chicago Tribune supports this version. However, eight years prior to that, Evers claimed to have gotten the ball directly from Hofman. Five years after the play, Merkle admitted that he had left the field without touching second, but only after umpire Emslie assured them that they had won the game. In 1914, O'Day said that Evers' tag was irrelevant: he had called the third out after McGinnity interfered with the throw from center field. Future Hall of Fame umpire Bill Klem said Merkle's boner was "the rottenest decision in the history of baseball"; Klem believed that the force rule was meant to apply to infield hits, not balls hit to the outfield.

== Replayed game ==
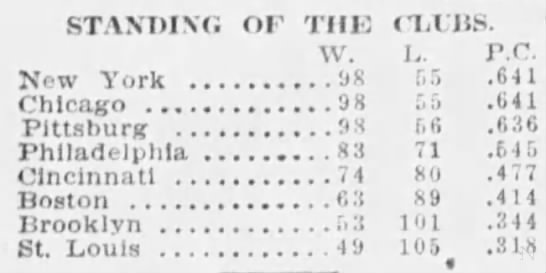
Standings of the National League prior to the replaying of the tied game

Unable to quickly clear the field of fans, O'Day ruled the game over on account of darkness. The game ended in a 1–1 tie. National League president Harry Pulliam upheld the ruling. On October 2, Pulliam rejected the Giants' appeal of O'Day's ruling and the Cubs' call for a forfeit victory and again upheld the umpires, declaring the force play on Merkle valid and the game a tie. The Cubs–Giants–Pirates pennant race continued to the final days. Rainouts during the season forced the Giants to play 10 games in the last week of the pennant race. After Merkle's boner, the Giants won 11 of their last 16 games to finish 98–55. The Cubs won 8 of their last 10 after the Merkle game to also finish 98–55. The Pirates, who beat the Dodgers 2–1 on September 23 to gain a half game on their rivals, won 9 of their last 10 to force a makeup game with the Cubs on October 4. The Cubs beat the Pirates, 5–2, leaving themselves tied with the Giants, and with the Pirates a half-game behind both teams at 98–56, they were thus eliminated.

On October 6, the National League board of directors agreed with its umpires and league president Pulliam, making a final ruling that Merkle had failed to touch second base and that the force rule was correctly applied. This left the Cubs and Giants tied at 98–55, and a makeup game was required to decide the NL pennant. To decide the pennant (and a spot in the World Series), the teams had to replay the tied game on October 8. Mathewson, scheduled to start the game, said, "I'm not fit to pitch today. I'm dog tired." The crowd was estimated at 40,000, the biggest in baseball history at that time. Pfiester pitched for the Cubs again in the rematch, but was removed from the game in the first inning after hitting Tenney, walking Herzog (who was promptly picked off), giving up an RBI double to Donlin, and walking Seymour. Future Hall of Famer Mordecai "Three Finger" Brown entered the game in relief and got out of the jam without allowing another run. In the Cubs' half of the third inning, Tinker led off with a triple and scored on a single by Johnny Kling. Evers walked, Frank Schulte followed with an RBI double to give the Cubs the lead, and Frank Chance followed with a two-run double. From there, Chicago cruised to a 4–2 victory, becoming champions of the NL for the third straight year.

October 8, 1908 at Polo Grounds, New York City, New York
Team	1	2	3	4	5	6	7	8	9	R	H	E
Chicago Cubs	0	0	4	0	0	0	0	0	0	4	9	0
New York Giants	1	0	0	0	0	0	1	0	0	2	5	0
WP: Mordecai Brown (29–9) LP: Christy Mathewson (37–11); Attendance: 40,000 (Time: 1:40); Umpires: Jim Johnstone, Bill Klem; Boxscore

== Aftermath ==
The Cubs went on to win the 1908 World Series, beating the Detroit Tigers four games to one. This was the Cubs' last world championship for more than a century; the next came in the 2016 World Series. The Pirates won the 1909 World Series, also against the Tigers. The Giants then returned to the World Series for three straight years, 1911–1913, only to lose each year—to the first of Connie Mack's two Philadelphia Athletics dynasties in 1911 and 1913, and to the Boston Red Sox in 1912. John McGraw's club did not win another championship until 1921, when they defeated the emerging New York Yankees, featuring Babe Ruth, two consecutive years in the Yankees' first World Series appearances.

The New York Times game story on September 24, 1908, blamed the loss on "censurable stupidity on the part of player Merkle." For the rest of his life, he lived with the nickname of "Bonehead". Merkle replaced Tenney as the full-time Giants first baseman in 1910 and was a regular for the Giants, Dodgers, and Cubs for another 10 years. He played in five World Series, all for the losing team. Bitter over the events of the "boner" game, Merkle avoided baseball after his playing career finally ended in 1926. When he finally appeared at a Giants old-timers' game in 1950, he got a loud ovation from the fans. He died in 1956.

On July 1, 2013, a minor league game between the Lansing Lugnuts and Great Lakes Loons featured a very similar play, in which an apparent game-winning single for the Lugnuts was nullified when the runner at first joined the celebration instead of advancing to second. The Lugnuts lost in extra innings.

== See also ==
- Warren Gill, a first baseman for the Pittsburgh Pirates who made a similar base-running mistake earlier in September 1908, also against the Chicago Cubs and also umpired by Hank O'Day, but was not called out.
- List of nicknamed MLB games and plays
