= Warren Gill =

American baseball player (1878–1952)

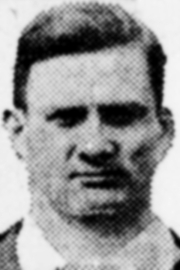
- First baseman
- Born: December 21, 1878; Ladoga, Indiana, U.S.
- Died: November 26, 1952 (aged 73); Laguna Beach, California, U.S.
- Batted: Right Threw: Right

MLB debut
- August 26, 1908, for the Pittsburgh Pirates

Last MLB appearance
- September 29, 1908, for the Pittsburgh Pirates

MLB statistics
- Batting average: .224
- Home runs: 0
- Runs batted in: 14
- Stats at Baseball Reference

Former teams
- Washington University Bears

Teams
- Pittsburgh Pirates (1908)

Warren Darst Gill (December 21, 1878 – November 26, 1952), nicknamed "Doc", was an American professional baseball player who played as a first baseman for the Pittsburgh Pirates during the 1908 Major League Baseball season. Gill graduated from Washington University in St. Louis.

Gill is best known for failing to touch second base in a game against the Chicago Cubs on September 4, 1908. With the game tied at 0 in the bottom of the 10th, Chief Wilson stroked a two-out single that scored the winning run. However, Johnny Evers saw that Gill did not touch second base. Umpire Hank O'Day, the only umpire working the game that day, said he did not see it and called the game over with a Pirates victory.

Three weeks later on September 23, 1908, New York Giants player Fred Merkle repeated Gill's error during a game against the Cubs, a play that subsequently entered baseball lore as Merkle's Boner.

In 27 major league games, Gill posted a .224 batting average (17-for-76) with 10 runs and 14 RBIs. Defensively, he handled 244 total chances (237 putouts, 7 assists) at first base without an error for a perfect 1.000 fielding percentage.
