= Bob Vail =

American baseball player (1881–1942)

- Pitcher
- Born: September 24, 1881; Linneus, Maine, U.S.
- Died: March 22, 1942 (aged 60); Philadelphia, Pennsylvania, U.S.
- Batted: Right Threw: Right

MLB debut
- August 27, 1908, for the Pittsburgh Pirates

Last MLB appearance
- September 18, 1908, for the Pittsburgh Pirates

MLB statistics
- Win–loss record: 1–2
- Earned run average: 6.00
- Strikeouts: 9
- Stats at Baseball Reference

Teams
- Pittsburgh Pirates (1908)

Robert Garfield Vail (September 24, 1881 – March 22, 1942), nicknamed "Doc", was an American Major League Baseball pitcher who briefly played with the Pittsburgh Pirates during the 1908 season. He batted and threw right-handed.

He was born in Linneus, Maine and died in Philadelphia, Pennsylvania.
