= Bill McGilvray =

American baseball player (1883–1952)

- Outfielder
- Born: April 29, 1883; Portland, Oregon
- Died: May 23, 1952 (aged 69); Denver, Colorado
- Batted: Right Threw: Right

MLB debut
- April 17, 1908, for the Cincinnati Reds

Last MLB appearance
- April 27, 1908, for the Cincinnati Reds

MLB statistics
- Batting average: .000
- Home runs: 0
- Runs batted in: 0
- Stats at Baseball Reference

Teams
- Cincinnati Reds (1908)

William Alexander McGilvray (April 29, 1883 – May 23, 1952) was a professional baseball player. He was an outfielder for one season (1908) with the Cincinnati Reds. For his career, he compiled no hits in 2 at-bats.

An alumnus of Stanford University, he was born in Portland, Oregon and died in Denver Colorado at the age of 69.
