= Solly Hofman =

American baseball player (1882–1956)

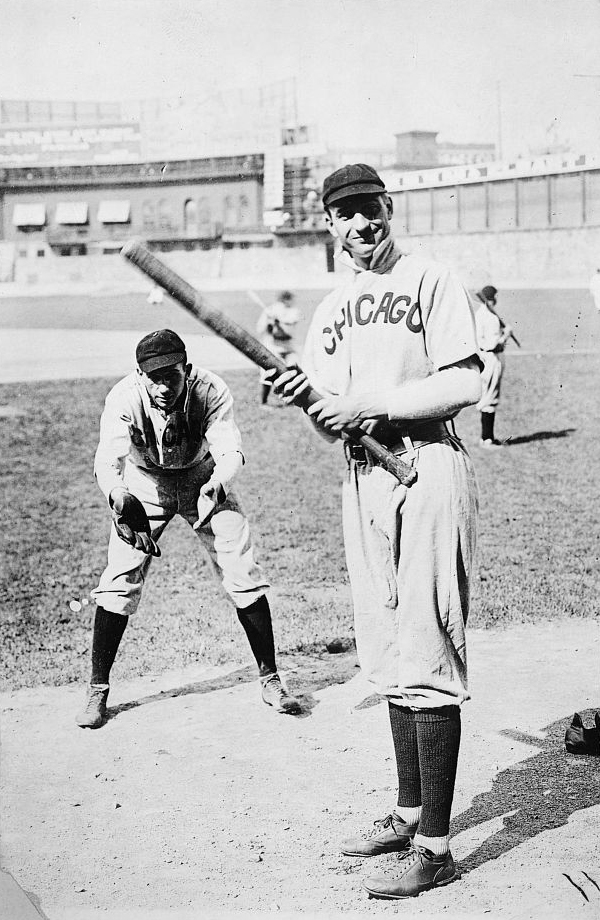
- Solly Hofman (right) with the Chicago Cubs at Philadelphia Ball Park in 1907
- Outfielder
- Born: October 29, 1882; St. Louis, Missouri, U.S.
- Died: March 10, 1956 (aged 73); St. Louis, Missouri, U.S.
- Batted: Right Threw: Right

MLB debut
- July 28, 1903, for the Pittsburgh Pirates

Last MLB appearance
- August 25, 1916, for the Chicago Cubs

MLB statistics
- Batting average: .269
- Home runs: 19
- Runs batted in: 498
- Stats at Baseball Reference

Teams
- Pittsburgh Pirates (1903); Chicago Cubs (1904–1912); Pittsburgh Pirates (1912–1913); Brooklyn Tip-Tops (1914); Buffalo Blues (1915); New York Yankees (1916); Chicago Cubs (1916)

Career highlights and awards
- World Series champion (1908)

Arthur Frederick "Solly" Hofman (October 29, 1882 – March 10, 1956) was an American Major League Baseball player from 1903 to 1916. He played the majority of his 1,194 games in the outfield.

His nickname was "Circus Solly". Some attribute this name to a comic strip of the era, while others attribute it to spectacular catches while fielding. He is considered by some to be the first great utility player in baseball due to his versatility.

In the 1906 World Series, Hofman batted leadoff and played center field for the Chicago Cubs against their crosstown rivals, the Chicago White Sox. He had seven hits and three walks during the Series, batting .304. Hofman was the Cubs' center fielder on October 14, 1908 when they defeated the Detroit Tigers 2-0 to win the 1908 World Series. He hit .316 for the Series. It was the Cubs' last championship until 2016.

In 1,194 games over 14 seasons, Hofman compiled a .269 batting average (1095-for-4072) with 554 runs, 162 doubles, 60 triples, 19 home runs, 498 runs batted in, 208 stolen bases, 421 base on balls, 323 strikeouts, .340 on-base percentage and .352 slugging percentage. Defensively, he recorded a .966 fielding percentage at all positions except catcher. In three World Series covering 16 games (1906, 1908, 1910), he batted .298 (17-for-57) with 7 runs, 8 runs batted in and 3 stolen bases.

He was the uncle of Bobby Hofman of the New York Giants. Hofman died on March 10, 1956 in St. Louis, Missouri, just eight days after the death of Fred Merkle, who committed the crucial running mistake in 1908 that led the Cubs to the World Series.
