= Dick Bayless =

American baseball player (1885–1920)

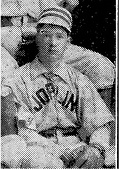
- Outfielder
- Born: September 6, 1883; Joplin, Missouri, U.S.
- Died: December 16, 1920 (aged 37); Santa Rita, New Mexico, U.S.
- Batted: Left Threw: Right

MLB debut
- September 9, 1908, for the Cincinnati Reds

Last MLB appearance
- October 4, 1908, for the Cincinnati Reds

MLB statistics
- Batting average: .225
- Home runs: 1
- Runs batted in: 3
- Stats at Baseball Reference

Teams
- Cincinnati Reds (1908)

Harry Owen "Dick" Bayless (September 6, 1885 – December 16, 1920) was an American professional baseball player. He was an outfielder for one season (1908) with the Cincinnati Reds. He played in the minor leagues through 1917. He died three years later in a copper mine explosion in Santa Rita, New Mexico.
