= Jim Kane (baseball) =

American baseball player (1881–1947)

- First baseman
- Born: November 27, 1881; Scranton, Pennsylvania, U.S.
- Died: October 2, 1947 (aged 65); Omaha, Nebraska, U.S.
- Batted: Left Threw: Left

MLB debut
- April 21, 1908, for the Pittsburgh Pirates

Last MLB appearance
- October 4, 1908, for the Pittsburgh Pirates

MLB statistics
- Batting average: .241
- Home runs: 0
- Runs batted in: 22
- Stats at Baseball Reference

Teams
- Pittsburgh Pirates (1908)

James Joseph Kane (November 27, 1881 – October 2, 1947) was an American professional baseball player who played first base for the Pittsburgh Pirates in the 1908 Major Leagues.
