= Rube Kroh =

American baseball player (1886–1944)

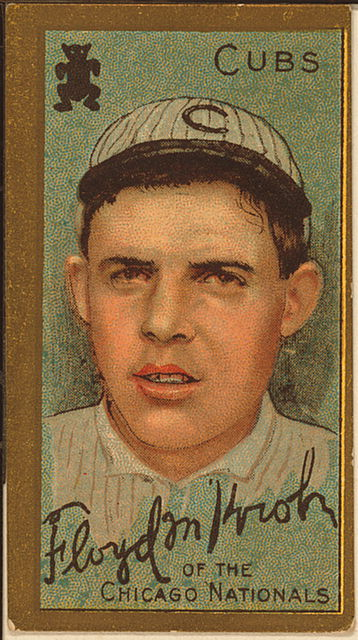
- Pitcher
- Born: August 25, 1886; Friendship, New York, U.S.
- Died: March 17, 1944 (aged 57); New Orleans, Louisiana, U.S.
- Batted: Left Threw: Left

MLB debut
- September 30, 1906, for the Boston Americans

Last MLB appearance
- August 22, 1912, for the Boston Braves

MLB statistics
- Win–loss record: 13–9
- Earned run average: 2.29
- Strikeouts: 92
- Stats at Baseball Reference

Teams
- Boston Americans (1906–1907); Chicago Cubs (1908–1910); Boston Braves (1912)

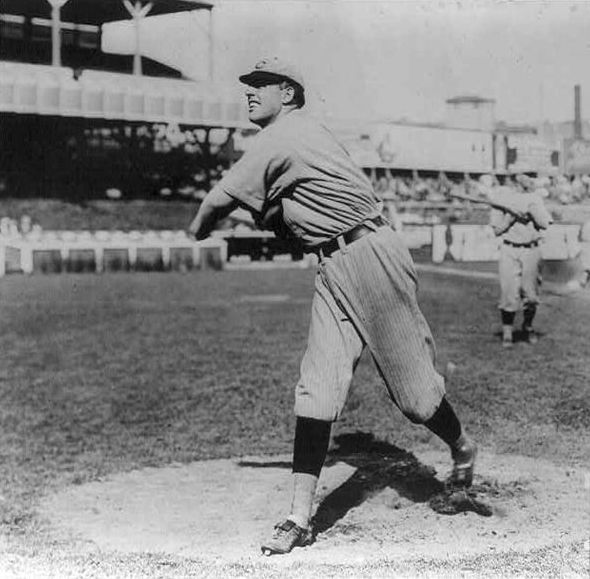
Rube Kroh

Floyd Myron "Rube" Kroh (August 25, 1886 – March 17, 1944) was an American professional baseball player who pitched in the Major Leagues from 1906 to 1912. He played for the Boston Braves, Boston Americans, and Chicago Cubs. He is generally credited as the player who got the ball into the hands of Johnny Evers in the famous Merkle's Boner game.
