= John Kane (outfielder) =

American baseball player (1882–1934)

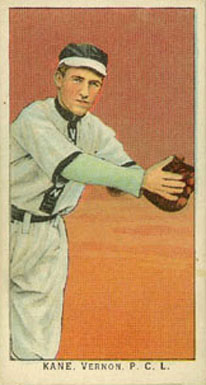
- Outfielder
- Born: September 24, 1882; Chicago, Illinois, U.S.
- Died: January 28, 1934 (aged 51); St. Anthony, Idaho, U.S.
- Batted: Right Threw: Right

MLB debut
- April 11, 1907, for the Cincinnati Reds

Last MLB appearance
- October 15, 1910, for the Chicago Cubs

MLB statistics
- Batting average: .220
- Home runs: 7
- Runs batted in: 59
- Stats at Baseball Reference

Teams
- Cincinnati Reds (1907–1908); Chicago Cubs (1909–1910)

John Francis Kane (September 24, 1882 – January 28, 1934) was an American professional baseball player who played outfield in the Major Leagues from 1907 to 1910. He would play for the Chicago Cubs and Cincinnati Reds.

In 261 games over four seasons, Kane posted a .220 batting average (181-for-824) with 118 runs, 7 home runs, 59 RBIs, 53 stolen bases and 76 bases on balls. Defensively, he finished his career with an overall .952 fielding percentage playing at every position except pitcher, catcher and first base.

Kane died in an automobile accident in St. Anthony, Idaho.
