= Bill Mack (baseball) =

American baseball player (1885–1971)

- Pitcher
- Born: February 12, 1885; Elmira, New York, U.S.
- Died: September 30, 1971 (aged 86); Elmira, New York, U.S.
- Batted: Left Threw: Left

MLB debut
- July 14, 1908, for the Chicago Cubs

Last MLB appearance
- July 21, 1908, for the Chicago Cubs

MLB statistics
- Win–loss record: 0–0
- Earned run average: 3.00
- Strikeouts: 2
- Stats at Baseball Reference

Teams
- Chicago Cubs (1908)

William Francis Mack (February 12, 1885 – September 30, 1971) was an American pitcher in Major League Baseball. He played for the Chicago Cubs in July 1908. He was the last surviving player to have played for the 1908 Chicago Cubs, their most recent World Series championship until 2016.
