= Bunny Pearce =

American baseball player (1885–1933)

Ducky Pearce
- Catcher
- Born: March 17, 1885; Corning, Ohio, U.S.
- Died: May 22, 1933 (aged 48); Brownstown, Indiana, U.S.
- Batted: Right Threw: Right

MLB debut
- July 1, 1908, for the Cincinnati Reds

Last MLB appearance
- May 30, 1909, for the Cincinnati Reds

MLB statistics
- Batting average: .000
- Home runs: 0
- Runs batted in: 0
- Stats at Baseball Reference

Teams
- Cincinnati Reds (1908–1909)

William Charles Pearce (March 17, 1885 – May 22, 1933) was an American professional baseball player. He was a catcher for two seasons (1908–1909) with the Cincinnati Reds. For his career, he compiled no hits in 4 at-bats.
