= Carl Spongberg =

American baseball player (1884–1938)

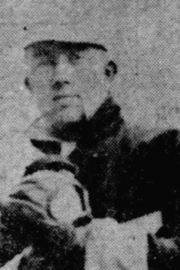
- Pitcher
- Born: May 21, 1884; Idaho Falls, Idaho
- Died: July 21, 1938 (aged 54); Los Angeles, California
- Batted: Right Threw: Right

MLB debut
- August 1, 1908, for the Chicago Cubs

Last MLB appearance
- August 1, 1908, for the Chicago Cubs

MLB statistics
- Win–loss record: 0–0
- Earned run average: 9.00
- Strikeouts: 4

Teams
- Chicago Cubs (1908)

Carl Gustave Spongberg (May 21, 1884 – July 21, 1938) was a pitcher in Major League Baseball (MLB) for the Chicago Cubs. He was the first Idaho-born player in MLB history.

Spongberg pitched for a team based in Montpelier, Idaho before catching on with a club in Utah in 1907, where he was described in the Salt Lake Herald as a "Young Phenom." He left Utah in 1908 to join the Northwestern League club in Aberdeen, Washington but could not crack a pitching staff that included Bill Brinker, Con Starkel and Gus Thompson. He was released and went to work on the railroads while playing baseball in a Sunday league. By that summer, he was pitching for a team in Ogden, Utah. He was signed by the Chicago Cubs in late July of 1908.

On August 1, 1908, he appeared in the only game of his MLB career in Boston against Joe Kelley's Doves. He entered the game in the second inning in relief of Chick Fraser and allowed seven runs in seven innings. He also recorded two hits off of Cecil Ferguson.

Later that month, he was farmed out to a club in Springfield, Illinois. He finished the season pitching in Salt Lake City. He returned to Springfield in the spring of 1909 but was released and returned west to pitch in Grand Junction, Colorado. In July 1909, Spongberg sprained his ankle while trying to walk more than 20 miles (32 km) from Collbran, Colorado, where his team had just played, to De Beque, Colorado, where his team's next game was scheduled.

On May 1, 1913, he was married in Salt Lake City to Jean Leishman of Logan, Utah. At the time, he had been working for Walker Brothers bank in Salt Lake City for two years. Later in the 1910s, he ran a grocery store in Montpelier while playing baseball locally. By 1921, he was managing a wholesale office in Pocatello, Idaho. By 1927, he was managing a Western States Grocery Company warehouse in Bakersfield, California. In 1935, he moved from Oregon to Denver to work as a divisional manager for Safeway. He died of pneumonia in Los Angeles in 1938.
