= Tinker Building =

- U.S. National Register of Historic Places
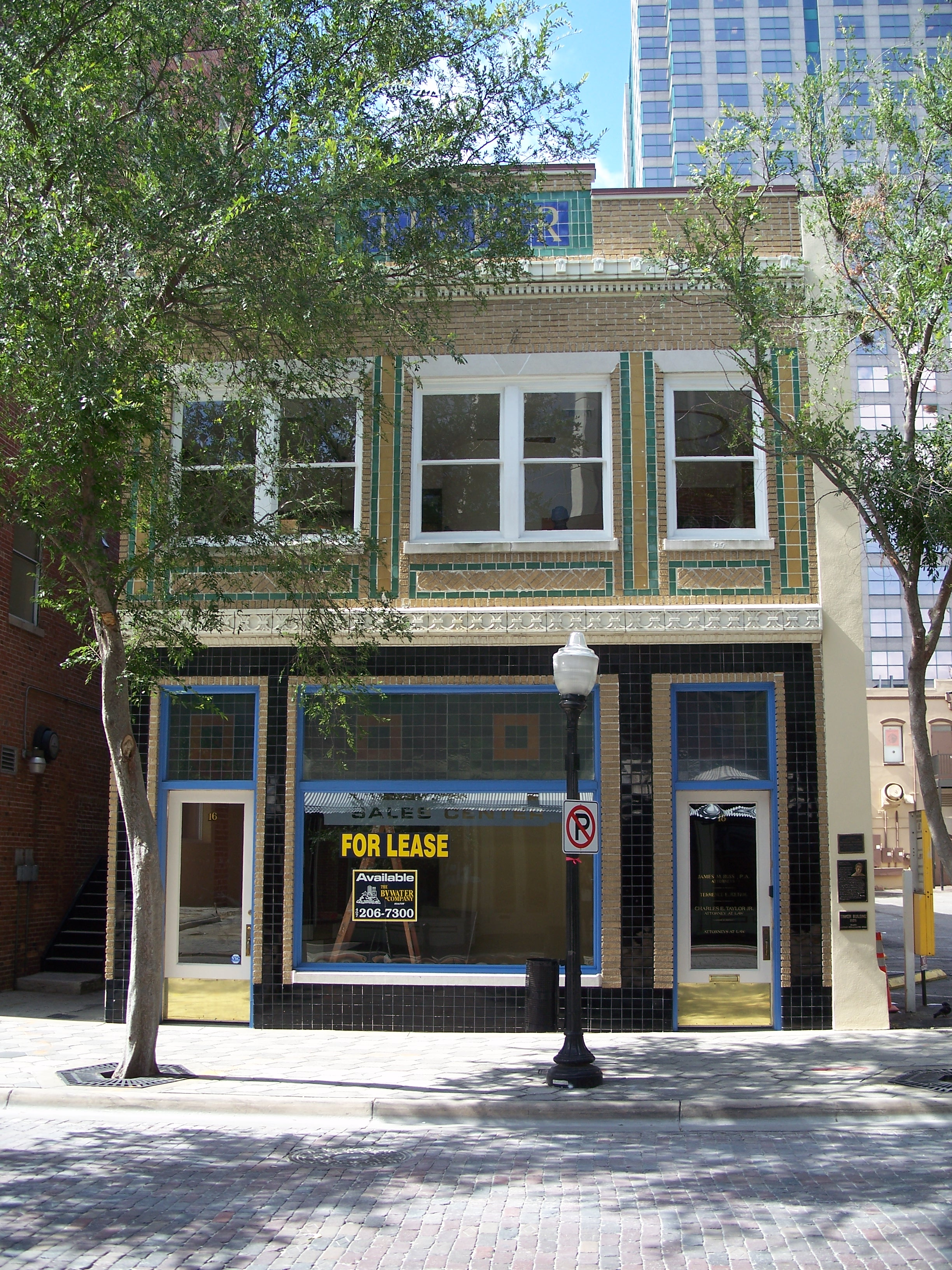
- Tinker Building, at 16 and 18 West Pine Street

- Location within Florida Location within the United States
- Location: Orlando, Florida
- Coordinates: 28°32′27″N 81°22′47″W
- Built: 1925
- NRHP reference No.: 80000957
- Added to NRHP: July 17, 1980

The Tinker Building is a historic building in Orlando, Florida located at 16 and 18 West Pine Street. On July 17, 1980, it was added to the U.S. National Register of Historic Places.
