= Mike Mitchell (baseball) =

American baseball player (1879–1961)

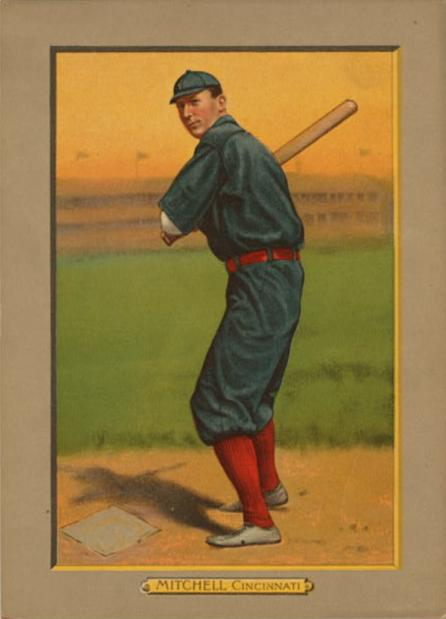
- Outfielder
- Born: December 12, 1879; Springfield, Ohio, U.S.
- Died: July 16, 1961 (aged 81); Phoenix, Arizona, U.S.
- Batted: Right Threw: Right

MLB debut
- April 11, 1907, for the Cincinnati Reds

Last MLB appearance
- April 30, 1914, for the Washington Senators

MLB statistics
- Batting average: .278
- Hits: 1,138
- Home runs: 27
- Runs batted in: 514
- Stats at Baseball Reference

Teams
- Cincinnati Reds (1907–1912); Chicago Cubs (1913); Pittsburgh Pirates (1913–1914); Washington Senators (1914)

Career highlights and awards
- Led NL in triples twice (1909, 1910)

Michael Francis Mitchell (December 12, 1879 – July 16, 1961) was an outfielder in Major League Baseball from 1907 to 1914. He played for the Cincinnati Reds, Chicago Cubs, Pittsburgh Pirates, and Washington Senators. Known for his powerful throwing arm, Mitchell was also a decent hitter who led the National League in triples twice. He stood at 6' 1" and weighed 185 lbs.

== Minor league career ==
Mitchell was born in Springfield, Ohio. He started his professional baseball career in 1902 with the New York State League's Schenectady Electricians. He stayed in the NYSL for the next two seasons and then moved to the Pacific Coast League in 1905. In 1906, he had "one of the greatest minor-league seasons of the Deadball Era", winning the batting title and also leading the PCL in hits, home runs, total bases, and slugging percentage.

== Major league career ==
Mitchell went to the major leagues the following season with the Cincinnati Reds. He made an immediate impact as a rookie, finishing seventh in the batting race and leading the National League in outfield assists, with 39. The assists mark set a record that was not broken until 1930. According to Bill James, Mitchell had the best outfield arm of his era.

Mitchell slumped in 1908, but he rebounded in 1909 with a career-high .310 batting average and a career-high 152 OPS+. He led the league in triples, with 17, and finished second in batting average and slugging percentage. Mitchell then hit 18 more triples in 1910 to lead the league again. From 1909 to 1911, he scored over 70 runs, drove in over 80 runs, hit over 15 triples, and stole over 30 bases each season.

Mitchell's power numbers went down slightly in 1912, and in December he was traded to the Chicago Cubs. He played for the Cubs, Pittsburgh Pirates, and Washington Senators over the next two seasons before retiring from the game.

Mitchell died in 1961 in Phoenix, Arizona.

== See also ==
- List of Major League Baseball career stolen bases leaders
- List of Major League Baseball career triples leaders
- List of Major League Baseball annual triples leaders
