= Dick Egan (infielder) =

American baseball player (1884–1947)

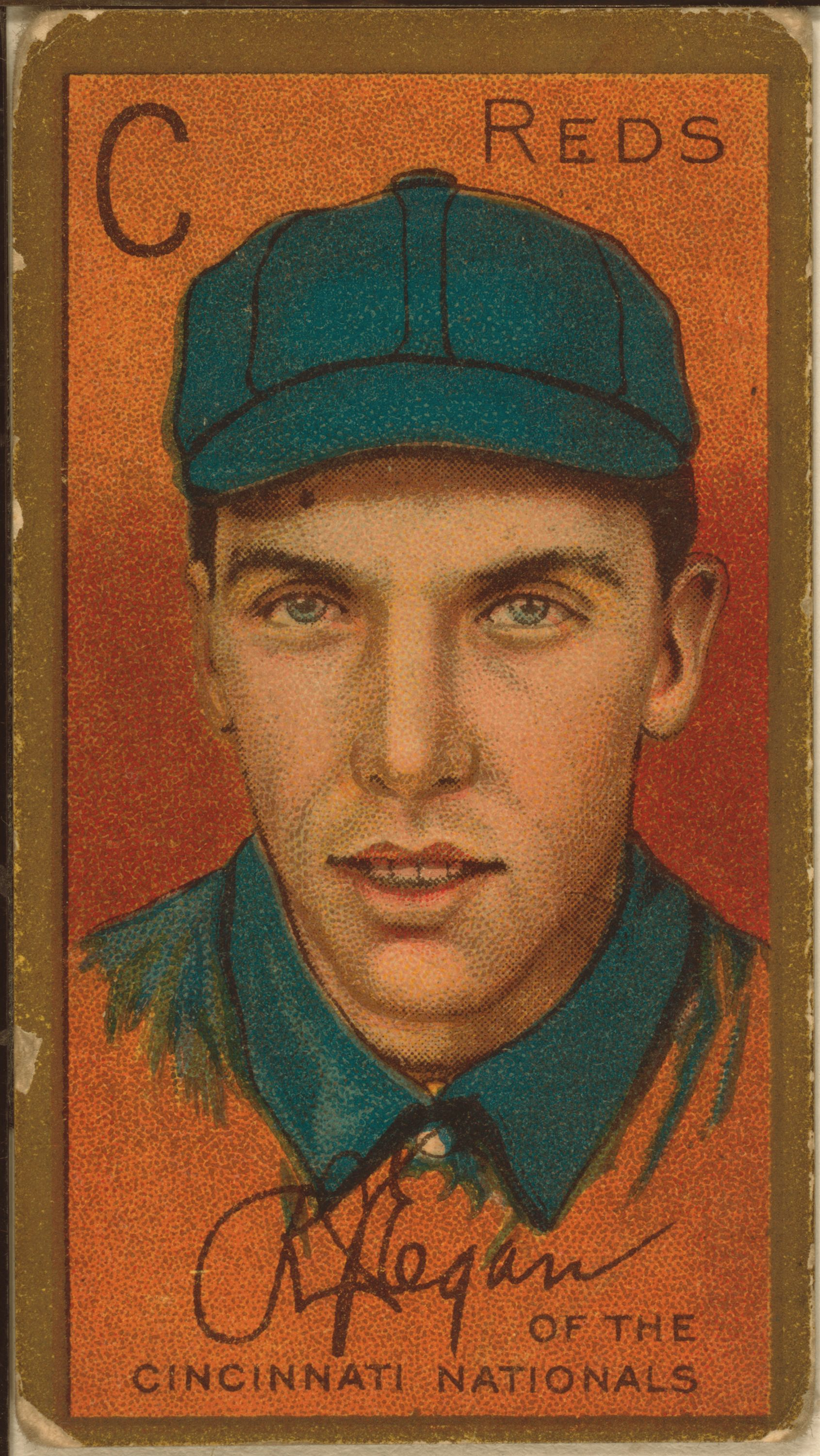
- Second baseman
- Born: June 23, 1884; Portland, Oregon, U.S.
- Died: July 7, 1947 (aged 63); Oakland, California, U.S.
- Batted: Right Threw: Right

MLB debut
- September 15, 1908, for the Cincinnati Reds

Last MLB appearance
- October 5, 1916, for the Boston Braves

MLB statistics
- Batting average: .249
- Home runs: 4
- Runs batted in: 292

Teams
- Cincinnati Reds (1908–1913); Brooklyn Robins (1914–1915); Boston Braves (1915–1916)

Richard Joseph Egan (June 23, 1884 – July 7, 1947) was a shortstop/second baseman who played in Major League Baseball from 1908 through 1916 for the Cincinnati Reds (1908–1913), Brooklyn Robins (1914–1915) and Boston Braves (1915–1916).

== Life and career ==
Egan batted and threw right-handed. He was born in Portland, Oregon, and attended Fordham University. In a nine-season career, Egan was a .249 hitter with four home runs and 292 RBI in 917 games played, including 374 runs, 87 doubles, 29 triples and 167 stolen bases.

=== Death ===
Egan died in Oakland, California, at the age of 63.

== See also ==
- List of Major League Baseball career stolen bases leaders
