= Andy Coakley =

American baseball player (1882–1963)

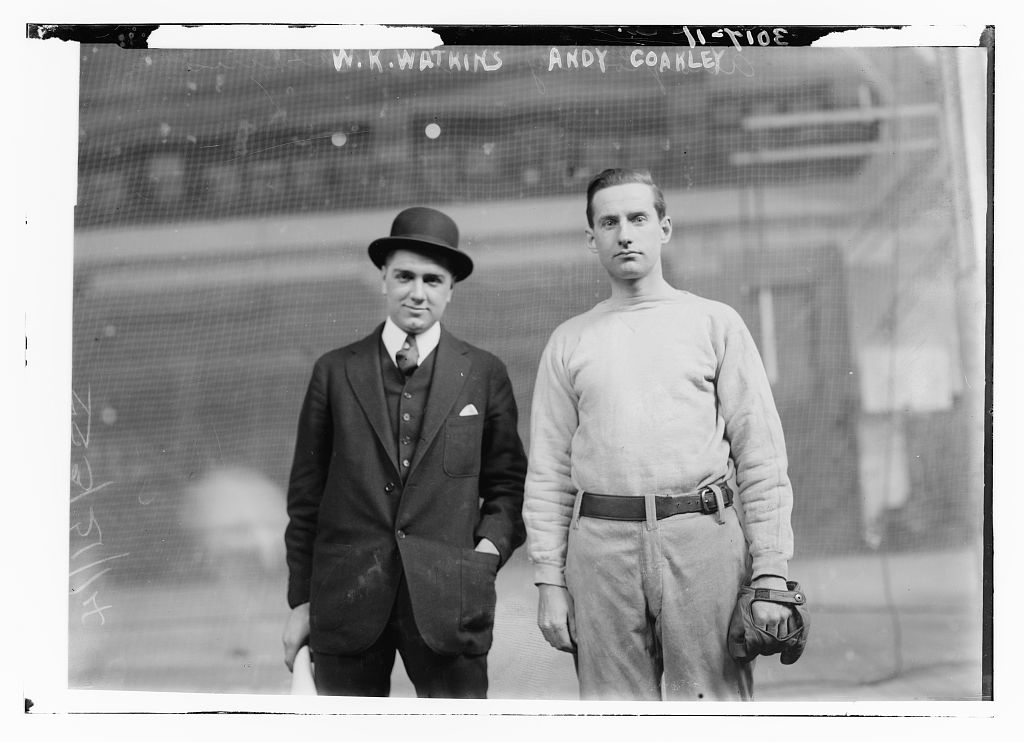
- W. K. Watkins and Andy Coakley
- Pitcher
- Born: November 20, 1882; Providence, Rhode Island, U.S.
- Died: September 27, 1963 (aged 80); New York, New York, U.S.
- Batted: Left Threw: Right

MLB debut
- September 17, 1902, for the Philadelphia Athletics

Last MLB appearance
- June 27, 1911, for the New York Highlanders

MLB statistics
- Win–loss record: 58–59
- Earned run average: 2.35
- Strikeouts: 428
- Stats at Baseball Reference

Teams
- Philadelphia Athletics (1902–1906); Cincinnati Reds (1907–1908); Chicago Cubs (1908–1909); New York Highlanders (1911)

Andrew James Coakley (November 20, 1882 – September 27, 1963) was an American pitcher in Major League Baseball. He played for the Philadelphia Athletics (1902–1906), Cincinnati Reds (1907–1908), Chicago Cubs (1908–1909), and New York Highlanders (1911).

== Playing career ==
Coakley was born in Providence, Rhode Island, in 1882. He helped the Athletics win the 1902 and 1905 American League pennants and the Cubs win the 1908 World Series, though he did not play in the latter. Coakley was the last surviving member of the 1908 Cubs team. His only postseason appearance was a complete game 9–0 loss to the New York Giants in the 1905 World Series. Although the Athletics gave up nine runs that day, Coakley was only charged with three earned runs, as the A's committed five errors behind him.

In nine MLB seasons, Coakley had a 58–59 win–loss record in 150 games, with 87 complete games, 11 shutouts, 3 saves, 1,072 1/3 innings pitched, 1,021 hits allowed, 436 runs allowed, 9 home runs allowed, 314 walks, 428 strikeouts, 26 hit batsmen, 15 wild pitches, 2 balks, and a 2.35 earned run average. He ranks 21st among the MLB career ERA leaders.

== Later life ==
Following his playing career, Coakley coached baseball at Williams College (1911–1913), and Columbia University (pitching coach 1914, head coach 1915–1918, 1920–1951). In 1923, Lou Gehrig was one of his players.

Coakley died in New York City at the age of 80. He is interred at Kensico Cemetery in Valhalla, New York.
