= Hank O'Day =

American baseball player, manager, and umpire (1859–1935)

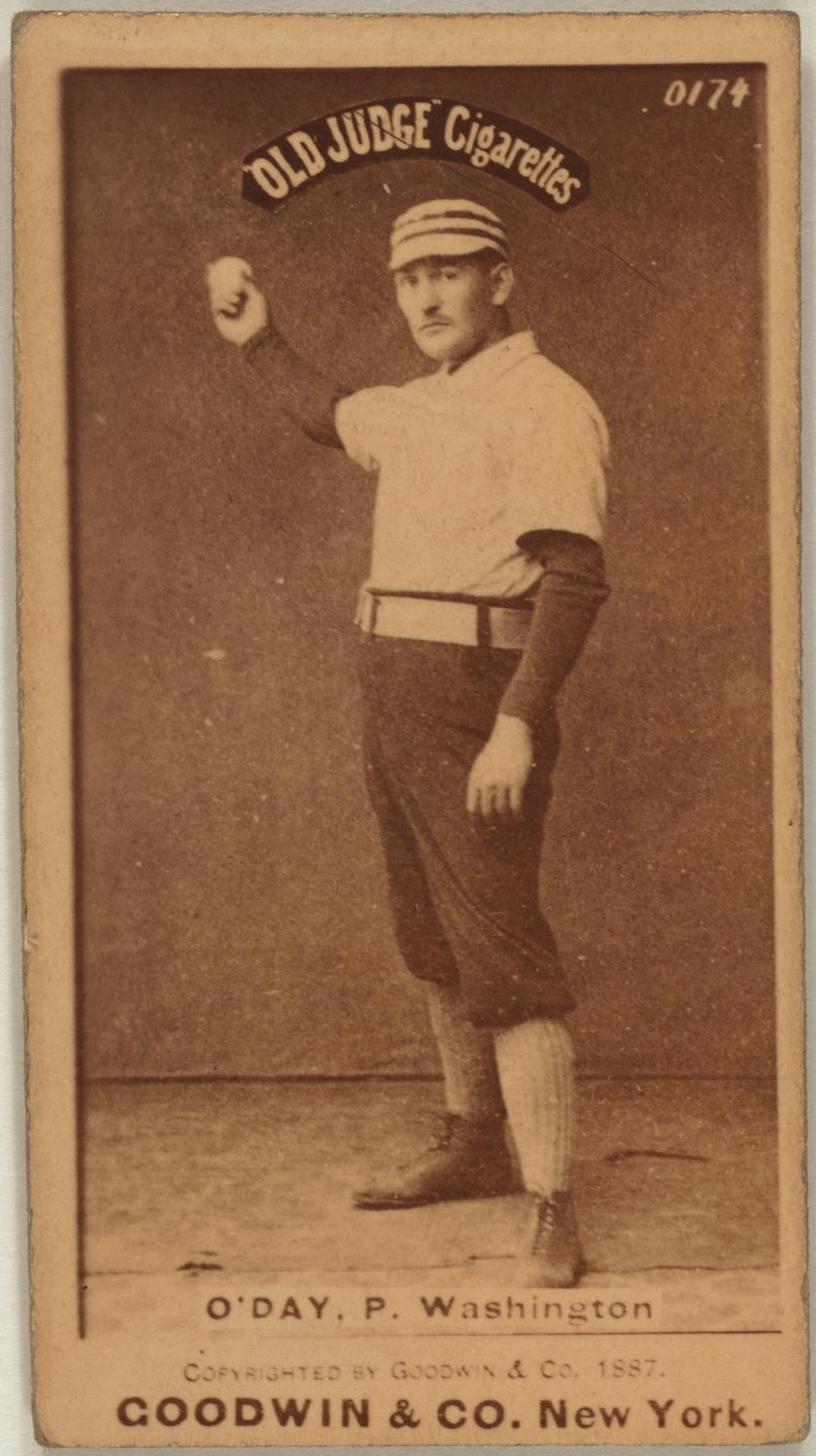
- Pitcher / Umpire / Manager
- Born: July 8, 1859; Chicago, Illinois, U.S.
- Died: July 2, 1935 (aged 75); Chicago, Illinois, U.S.
- Batted: Unknown Threw: Right

MLB debut
- May 2, 1884, for the Toledo Blue Stockings

Last MLB appearance
- October 3, 1890, for the New York Giants (PL)

MLB statistics
- Win–loss record: 73–110
- Earned run average: 3.74
- Strikeouts: 663
- Managerial record: 153–154–4
- Winning percentage: .498
- Stats at Baseball Reference

Teams
- As player: Toledo Blue Stockings (1884); Pittsburgh Alleghenys (1885); Washington Nationals (1886–1889); New York Giants (1889); New York Giants (PL) (1890); As manager: Cincinnati Reds (1912); Chicago Cubs (1914)

Member of the National

Baseball Hall of Fame
- Induction: 2013
- Vote: 93.8%
- Election method: Pre-Integration Era Committee

Henry M. O'Day (July 8, 1859 – July 2, 1935), nicknamed "the Reverend", was an American right-handed pitcher and later an umpire and manager in Major League Baseball. After a seven-year major league playing career, he worked as a National League (NL) umpire for 30 seasons between 1895 and 1927.

O'Day umpired in ten World Series – second only to Bill Klem's total of 18 – including five of the first seven played, and was behind the plate for the first modern World Series game in 1903. Retiring at age 68 years, 2 months, he remained the oldest umpire in major league history for 97 years – a fact which was not known until recently, as he routinely shaved five to seven years from his true age throughout his career. His 3,986 total games as an umpire ranked third in major league history when he retired, and his 2,710 games as the plate umpire still rank second in major league history to Klem's total of 3,544. He is largely known for his controversial decision in a pivotal 1908 game, a ruling that still causes debate today. O'Day interrupted his umpiring career twice for single seasons as a manager, leading the Cincinnati Reds in 1912 and the Chicago Cubs in 1914. He remains the only person ever to serve full seasons in the NL as a player, manager and umpire. O'Day was inducted into the National Baseball Hall of Fame in July 2013.

== Early life ==
O'Day was born in Chicago, the son of railroad engineer James O'Day (c. 1824 – 1885) and his wife Margaret (c. 1822 – 1895), who were immigrants from Ireland and were both deaf. The couple had at least seven children: Daniel (c. 1846 – 1898), James Jr. (c. 1854 – before 1895), Catherine (c. 1856 – 1901), Henry, Margaret (c. 1864 – before 1895), Mary McNamara (c. 1866 – 1924), and Joseph (1870–1885). The O'Days originally settled in Buffalo, New York; by the mid-1850s, they had moved to Cincinnati, and they relocated to Chicago around 1858. Henry was born in the vicinity of Ewing Street (later renamed Cabrini Street) and Jefferson Street, which was just one block north of the starting point of the Chicago Fire in 1871. By 1870, the family had moved about two miles west to 1022 W. Jackson Street (renumbered in 1909 as 2433 W. Jackson Boulevard), which remained the family residence until the early 20th century. O'Day worked as a steam fitter in Chicago before entering organized baseball.

== Playing career ==
O'Day played minor league baseball with the Bay City club and the Toledo Blue Stockings of the Northwestern League in 1883, and he reached the major leagues when Toledo joined the American Association (AA) the following year. With Toledo, he played alongside Fleet Walker, the first African American to play in the major leagues. O'Day made his major league debut on May 2, 1884, and served as the team's second pitcher behind Tony Mullane. In 41 games pitched for the Blue Stockings, he had 9 wins, 28 losses, a 3.75 earned run average (ERA), and 163 strikeouts; he is also one of three pitchers who have been retroactively credited with a save in the AA that season. In addition to pitching, O'Day appeared in 23 games as a position player that season, primarily in left field; he also made appearances at the other outfield positions, as well as at first base and third base. However, he made only 13 other non-pitching appearances in the field in later years, including eight games at shortstop in 1887–88. In 1885, he split playing time with the Pittsburgh Alleghenys of the AA and the Washington Nationals of the Eastern League. O'Day had a record of 5–7 for the Alleghenys; his playing time was limited because he was caring for his sick father. He made only five starts after May 11 and left the team for the last time after his July 6 start. His father died on July 9 at age 61. In the meantime, the Chicago White Stockings had opened West Side Park on June 6, less than a mile and a half from the O'Day residence. In 15 games with Washington in the Eastern League, he had a record of 13–2 and a 0.74 ERA. On September 5 of that year, his younger brother Joseph died at age 15 from injuries he had suffered two days earlier after falling from the front car of a roller coaster. At the end of the season, the Nationals folded, and O'Day joined a Louisville ball club; no record exists of him having played any games for them.

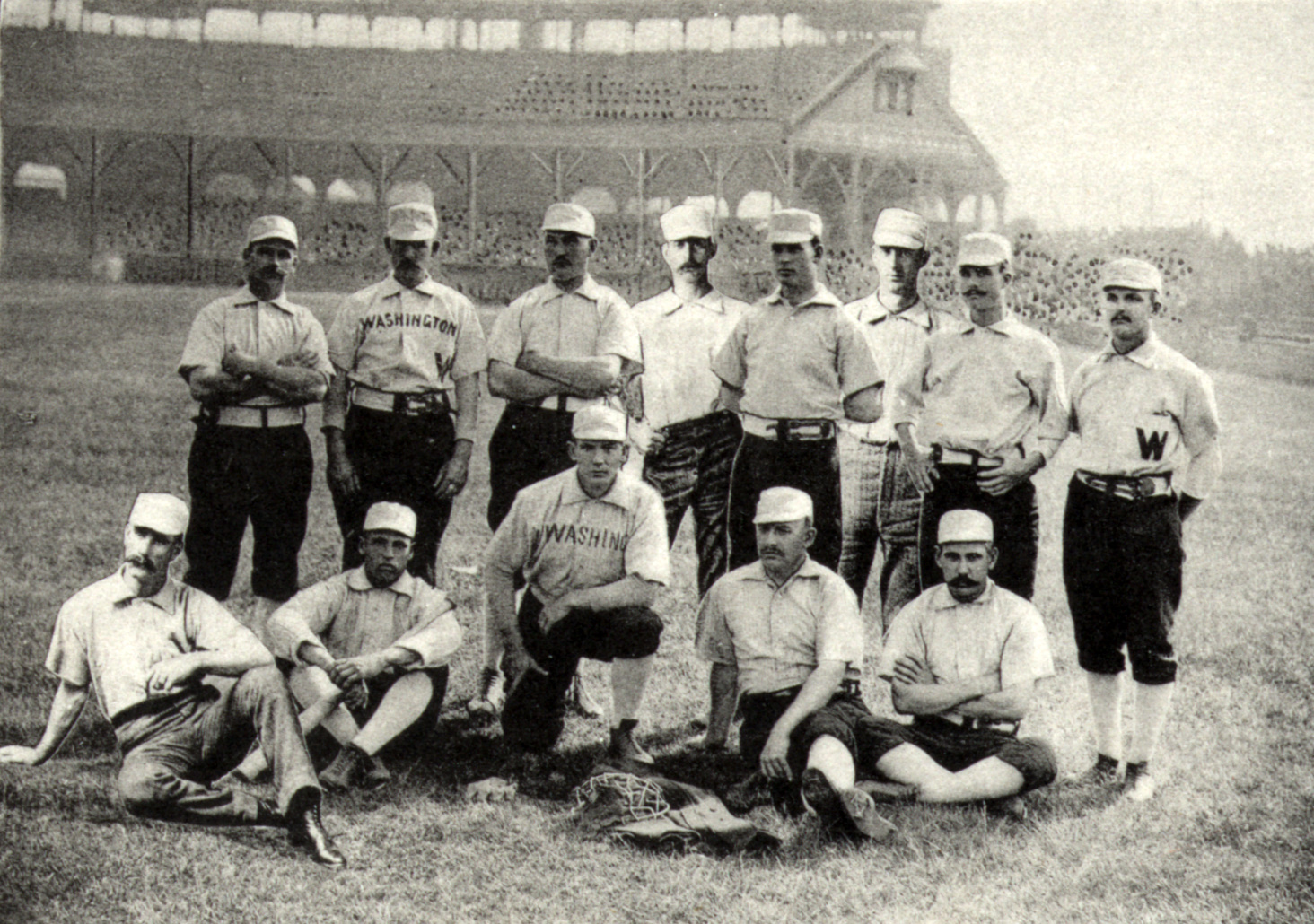
The 1888 Washington Nationals at Boston's South End Grounds

O'Day spent most of 1886 with the Savannah team in the Southern Association, and during his time there he was considered a favorite among other players. In 39 games with Savannah, O'Day won 26 games, lost 11, and had an ERA of 1.03. Late in the year, he joined the Washington Nationals, where he posted a 2–2 record in six games. O'Day became a full-time starter for the Nationals in 1887 and pitched the second-most games behind Jim Whitney. In 30 games, he won 8 games, lost 20, and had a 4.17 ERA and 109 walks, the fifth-most walks in the league. In 1888, O'Day became the Nationals' workhorse, starting 46 games. His ERA and win totals improved to 3.10 and 16, but he led the NL in losses with 29 and was second in walks with 117 in 403 innings pitched. He also played eight games at shortstop in 1887 and 1888. O'Day's high loss total was noted by Sporting Life as due to ineffective hitting by the Nationals rather than as a result of his pitching.

In 13 games for Washington in 1889, O'Day had a 2–10 record and a 4.33 ERA. On July 26, he was purchased by the New York Giants; his first game with the Giants was against his former team, a game which he lost. O'Day then went on to win his next nine starts to finish the year with a 9–1 record for the Giants. He earned two strong wins in the 1889 World Series, including a 2–1 11-inning victory on October 25, to give the Giants the National League title; the Giants' midseason purchase of O'Day was considered to be the reason they won. In 1890, O'Day jumped ship to the New York Giants of the newly established Players' League. With them, he enjoyed his best season by going 22–13 with a 4.21 ERA for the Giants, pitching 329 innings in 43 games, and he has since been credited with tying for the league lead with 3 saves. However, he developed arm trouble as a result of so many innings pitched, and he spent three more years in the minor leagues with the Lincoln Rustlers of the Western Association (1891), the Columbus Reds of the Western League (1892) and the Erie Blackbirds of the Eastern League (1893) before retiring as a player.

In 201 career games and 1,651 1/3 innings pitched, O'Day posted a record of 73–110 with an ERA of 3.74 and 663 strikeouts. At various points throughout his career, O'Day played all nine positions.

== Umpiring career ==
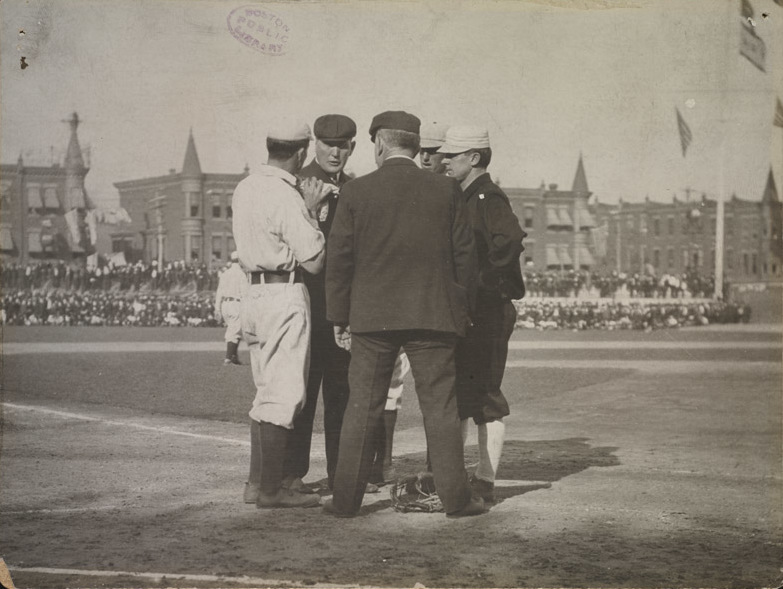
During the 1905 World Series, O'Day (back left) confers with plate umpire Jack Sheridan, New York manager John McGraw (right) and two Philadelphia players.

After O'Day finished his playing career, he worked as a clerk for the Chicago city recorder's office. While attending a Chicago baseball game as a spectator one Sunday in 1894, O'Day was recruited from the stands to substitute for umpire Thomas Lynch, who was unable to make it to the game due to a train service cancellation. O'Day performed so well that he was recruited into full-time service as a National League umpire the following year. On July 8, 1901, O'Day made a ruling in a game at St. Louis which proved pivotal in a 7–5 Brooklyn victory; the fans were so infuriated that they rushed the field after the game, and O'Day suffered a split lip before being rescued by players and police.

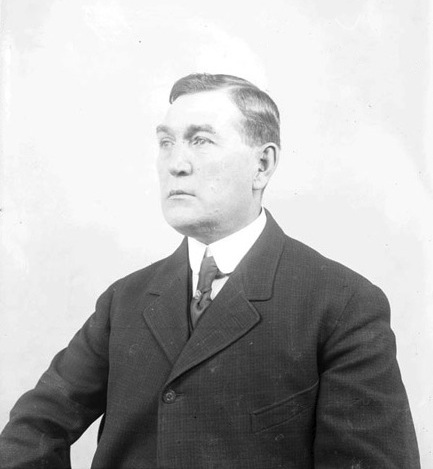
O'Day in 1907, during his umpiring career

In July 1906, O'Day was fined $50 (USD), equal to $1,792 today, by NL president Harry Pulliam in connection with a fight that broke out between Giants pitcher Joe McGinnity and Pirates catcher Heinie Peitz during a game. O'Day was cited as being negligent for failing to prevent the fight; he appealed the fine, but Pulliam would not relent. When Pulliam did not withdraw the fine, O'Day submitted his resignation on July 31. Pulliam refused to accept the resignation, but O'Day pledged not to work until the fine was withdrawn. O'Day did not report for his scheduled game at the Polo Grounds that day. He was rumored to be seeking an umpiring position in the Tri-State League, but he returned to the field for National League games by August 10.

=== Merkle's Boner ===
On September 23, 1908, O'Day was involved in one of the most controversial field decisions in major league history. He was working as the plate umpire in the game between the Cubs and the Giants, which ended when Al Bridwell's apparent walk-off single drove in the apparent winning run. However, baserunner Fred Merkle never advanced from first base to second, in keeping with the common practice of the era. When the Cubs produced a ball – not necessarily the game ball, which had been thrown into the crowd of fans walking across the field to exit the ballpark – and claimed a force play at second base, which would negate the run, the debate erupted.

Bob Emslie, who as base umpire had been watching the play at first base to verify that the batter had reached base, had not seen the play at second. O'Day ruled that the force play had been valid and that the run did not count, causing the game to end in a tie. At that time, Emslie and O'Day ranked as the two longest-serving umpires in major league history.

O'Day's letter to Pulliam follows (spelling and punctuation as in the original):

New York, Sept 23/08
Harry C. Pulliam, Esq.
Pres. Nat. League

Dear sir,

In the game to-day at New York between New York and the Chicago Club. In the last half of the 9th inning, the score was a tie 1–1. New York was at the Bat, with two Men out, McCormick of N. York on 3rd Base and Merkle of N. York on 1st Base; Bridwell was at the Bat and hit a clean single Base-Hit to Center Field. Merkle did not run the Ball out; he started toward 2nd Base, but on getting half way there he turned and ran down the field toward the Club House. The Ball was fielded in to 2nd Base for a Chgo. Man to make the play, when McGinnity ran from the Coacher's Box out in the Field to 2nd Base and interfered with the Play being made. Emslie, who said he did not watch Merkle, asked me if Merkle touched 2nd Base. I said he did not. Then Emslie called Merkle out, and I would not allow McCormick's Run to score. The Game at the end of the 9th inning was 1–1. The People ran out on the Field. I did not ask to have the Field cleared, as it was too dark to continue play.

Yours respt.
(signed)

Henry O'Day

President Pulliam upheld O'Day's decision, the game was ruled a tie, and a makeup game was scheduled. The Cubs defeated New York in that makeup game to win the pennant by a single game. The Milwaukee Journal later reported that O'Day and the Chicago team had been attuned to the play because of their involvement in a similar situation a few weeks earlier on September 4. During a mid-season game between Chicago and Pittsburgh, Cubs second baseman Johnny Evers tried to call O'Day's attention to the fact that a Pittsburgh player had not made it to second base on the game-winning play. Not seeing the runner miss the base, O'Day told Evers, "Go home and take a bath, Johnny. The game's over." The newspaper noted that "Chicago got the pennant by being given the derisive hoot a few weeks before."

== Managerial career ==
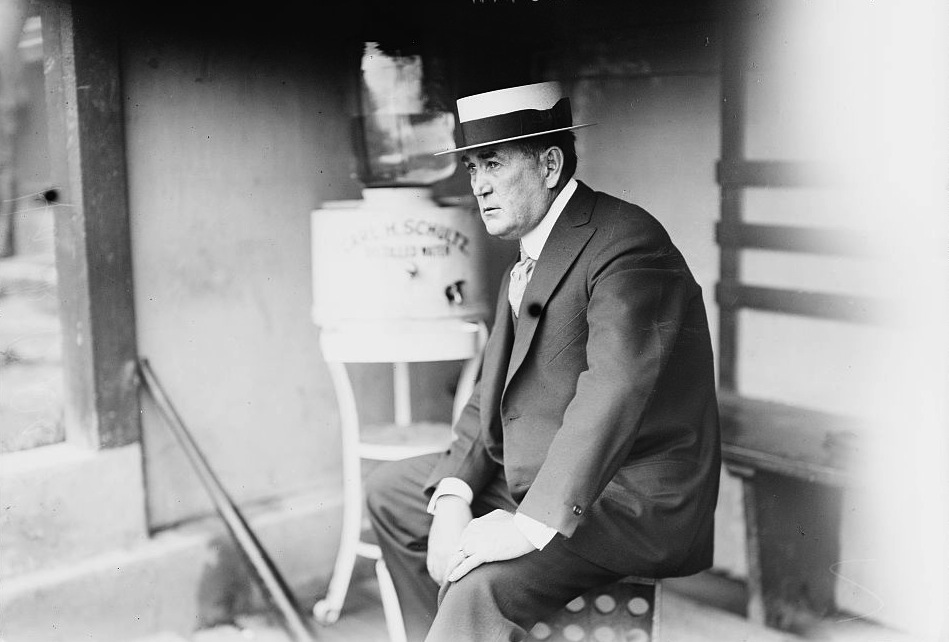
O'Day as Cubs manager (1914)

O'Day was connected with major league managing jobs as early as 1905. At that time, he said that he liked umpiring and that he was unsure whether he would accept a managing position even if an offer came to him. "I am not the least bit sure that I could better myself by giving up umpiring for a managerial job", O'Day said.

Several years later, O'Day interrupted his umpiring career to manage major league clubs during two separate seasons. In 1912, he agreed to become the manager of the Cincinnati Reds. This move surprised the baseball world, as O'Day had not been mentioned as a possibility to take the job. The team started off the year winning 20 of its first 25 games, creating the possibility that the Reds would win the World Series under their new manager. The Reds did not hold on to their early hot streak, however, and finished the season with a 75–78 record under O'Day. He resigned after the season, as the team was negotiating a trade for Joe Tinker and rumors surfaced that Tinker might become manager. In late 1912, O'Day was reported as saying that he would not return to umpiring, but he changed his mind by April and signed with the National League again.

After umpiring in 1913, he managed for another year, taking over the Chicago Cubs ballclub after player-manager Johnny Evers was traded despite a third-place finish by the Cubs the previous year. O'Day led the Cubs to a 78–76 record and a fourth-place finish. He led teams to fourth-place finishes in both of his seasons as a manager. In December, the Cubs signed Roger Bresnahan to be their manager, replacing O'Day, who returned to being an umpire.

== Return to umpiring ==
O'Day umpired in 10 World Series: 1903, 1905, 1907, 1908, 1910, 1916, 1918, 1920, 1923 and 1926. Only Bill Klem, whose hiring was recommended by O'Day, worked more. O'Day's World Series appearances include four of the first five played. In his first three World Series, a two-umpire system was used, with the two alternating between working home plate and the bases. In his next three Series, four umpires were assigned, but they worked in two-man crews that officiated alternating games; not until the 1918 Series did all four work every game. During the 1920 World Series, O'Day was the base umpire when Bill Wambsganss executed the only unassisted triple play in Series history. Although it was not known at the time, O'Day became the oldest umpire in history at age 65 years, 9 months when he began the 1925 season; it was long believed that Emslie still held the mark, having retired at the end of the 1924 season at age 65 years, 8 months. At the end of his career, O'Day's total of 3,986 games as an umpire placed him behind only Tommy Connolly (4,337) and Emslie (4,228) in major league history.

O'Day was the home plate umpire for no-hitters in four decades, a distinction that has been matched only by Harry Wendelstedt; he was behind the plate when Ted Breitenstein (April 22, 1898), Johnny Lush (May 1, 1906), Hod Eller (May 11, 1919) and Jesse Haines (July 17, 1924) each accomplished the feat.

O'Day served for many years on the major league rules committee and became known for its many heated debates over rule changes and applications. In 1920, the committee was considering the issue of game-winning hits in the bottom of the last inning; O'Day argued that batters should only be credited with as many bases as were necessary to score the winning run, even if the ball was hit over the fence for an apparent home run, saying, "you can't score runs after a game is over", while sportswriter Fred Lieb counter-argued that a fair ball hit over the fence must be counted as a home run regardless of the situation. Lieb's position was adopted by the committee, with O'Day complaining that Lieb was simply trying to accumulate more home runs for his friend Babe Ruth; O'Day did, however, succeed in preventing the rule from being applied retroactively.

O'Day began his career in an era during which only one umpire worked in most games, and he spent the remainder in a time when only two were used. In 1908, O'Day was quoted as saying that he preferred the single-man system and that he had run into more trouble in games with two umpires.

In The National League Story (1961), Lee Allen described O'Day as "a crusty old pitcher who had umpired in the league as early as 1888 and had the scars to prove it." O'Day maintained an intensely private life. He did, however, develop a lasting friendship with fellow umpire Emslie, one of his pitching opponents in the 1880s, after both had been in the league for a number of years. He also enjoyed long friendships with John Heydler, who had been a fellow umpire in the 1890s and later became O'Day's supervisor as NL president, and Connie Mack, who was O'Day's catcher for three years in Washington.

== Later life, death, and Hall of Fame ==
O'Day became an umpiring scout after he retired from active umpiring in 1927. In March 1935, he was said to be seriously ill with a stomach condition, and his doctor said it was "doubtful if he will ever get up again". He died of bronchial pneumonia and cancer at the Presbyterian hospital in Chicago on July 2, 1935. His funeral high mass at St. Jarlath's Church was attended by baseball notables including Commissioner Kenesaw Mountain Landis, former NL president John Heydler, and umpires Bob Emslie, Tom Connolly, Bill Klem, and Lord Byron. O'Day was buried in Calvary Cemetery in Evanston, Illinois.

O'Day was elected to the National Baseball Hall of Fame on December 3, 2012, by the Hall's new Pre-Integration Era Committee, which considered candidates from the era prior to 1947 once every three years. He was inducted the following July. His grandnephew Dennis McNamara gave his induction speech. McNamara, a former Chicago police officer, had another connection to a Hall of Famer, having introduced Ron Santo to his second wife, Vicki.

== See also ==
- Major League Baseball umpiring records
- List of Major League Baseball umpires (disambiguation)
- List of Major League Baseball annual saves leaders
