= Tom McCarthy (1900s pitcher) =

American baseball player (1884–1933)

- Pitcher
- Born: May 22, 1884; Fort Wayne, Indiana, U.S.
- Died: March 28, 1933 (aged 48); Mishawaka, Indiana, U.S.
- Batted: Unknown Threw: Right

MLB debut
- May 10, 1908, for the Cincinnati Reds

Last MLB appearance
- July 7, 1909, for the Boston Doves

MLB statistics
- Win–loss record: 7–9
- Earned run average: 2.34
- Strikeouts: 42
- Stats at Baseball Reference

Teams
- Cincinnati Reds (1908); Pittsburgh Pirates (1908); Boston Doves (1908–1909)

Thomas Patrick McCarthy (May 22, 1884 – March 28, 1933) was an American Major League Baseball pitcher from 1908 to 1909. He played for the Cincinnati Reds, Pittsburgh Pirates, and Boston Doves.
