= Moose McCormick =

American baseball player (1881–1962)

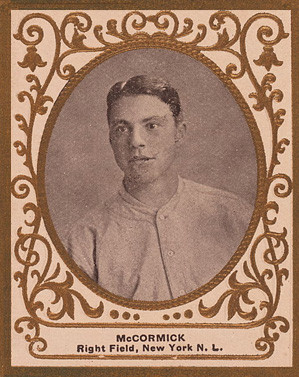
- 1909 baseball card of McCormick
- Outfielder
- Born: February 28, 1881; Philadelphia, Pennsylvania, U.S.
- Died: July 9, 1962 (aged 81); Lewisburg, Pennsylvania, U.S.
- Batted: Left Threw: Left

MLB debut
- April 14, 1904, for the New York Giants

Last MLB appearance
- October 4, 1913, for the New York Giants

MLB statistics
- Batting average: .285
- Home runs: 6
- Runs batted in: 133
- Stats at Baseball Reference

Teams
- New York Giants (1904); Pittsburgh Pirates (1904); Philadelphia Phillies (1908); New York Giants (1908–1909, 1912–1913)

Harry Elwood "Moose" McCormick (February 28, 1881 – July 9, 1962) was an American professional baseball outfielder. He played all or part of five seasons in Major League Baseball between 1904 and 1913 for the New York Giants, Pittsburgh Pirates, and Philadelphia Phillies. McCormick also served in the United States Army during World War I and as a civilian director of the United States Army Air Forces during World War II.

Under manager John McGraw of the Giants, he was one of the first pinch hitters in the game's history and was considered one of the best pinch hitters in the game.

== Early life ==
McCormick's father worked in the Philadelphia Gas Works, while his mother raised their five children. McCormick's father died when he was five years old, making him legally an orphan under Pennsylvania laws, and eligible to attend Girard College.

In high school, McCormick excelled in both baseball and American football. He got his nickname from classmates because of his large body size. McCormick graduated from Girard College in 1898, and enrolled at Bucknell University, where he played baseball, American football, basketball, and track and field for the Bucknell Bison. He succeeded future Giants teammate Christy Mathewson as Bucknell's starting fullback.

== Baseball career ==
Rather than graduating with his class at Bucknell in 1904, he left to play minor league baseball for the Jersey City Skeeters of the Eastern League in 1903. He joined the New York Giants of the National League in Major League Baseball (MLB) in 1904. McCormick was traded to the Pittsburgh Pirates as part of a three-team trade, with the Pirates sending Jimmy Sebring to the Cincinnati Reds and the Reds sending Mike Donlin to the Giants. After the season, the Pirates traded McCormick to the Philadelphia Phillies with Kitty Bransfield and Otto Krueger for Del Howard. However, McCormick stopped playing baseball, working as a steel salesman for the next three years.

McCormick returned to baseball in 1908. After appearing in eleven games for the Phillies, batting .091, the Phillies sold McCormick to the Giants. McGraw decided to use McCormick as a pinch hitter due to his lack of speed. While rounding third base during a game, Cy Seymour, who was coaching third base, tackled McCormick. When Giants manager John McGraw inquired, Seymour made an excuse about having the sun in his eyes. This led McGraw, now realizing the need for a full-time coach, to hire Arlie Latham for the role, the first full-time base coach in MLB. McCormick scored the potential winning run in the infamous 1908 Merkle game. The run was eventually nullified, the game ended in a tie, and the Giants lost the pennant by a single game.

McCormick again worked as a salesman in 1910 and 1911. He returned to MLB to play for the Giants in 1912 and 1913. He retired after the 1913 season.

== Later life ==
McCormick managed the Chattanooga Lookouts in 1914 and 1915. He worked for the Hess Steel Company in Baltimore, Maryland after his retirement. In 1917, he enlisted in the United States Army. He fought in France as a first lieutenant and captain in the 167th Infantry Regiment of the 42nd Infantry Division, known as the "Rainbow Division", during World War I. He then coached the Bucknell Bison baseball team in 1923 through 1925, and the Army Black Knights baseball team in 1928.

McCormick remained with the military, serving as a civilian director in the United States Army Air Forces during World War II. After the war, he served as Bucknell's director of housing. He died in Lewisburg, Pennsylvania, in 1962.

McCormick was inducted into the Bucknell Sports Hall of Fame in 1979.
