= 1909 Cincinnati Reds season =

1909 Cincinnati Reds
- League: National League
- Ballpark: Palace of the Fans
- City: Cincinnati, Ohio
- Owners: Garry Herrmann
- Managers: Clark Griffith

The 1909 Cincinnati Reds season was a season in American baseball. The team finished fourth in the National League with a record of 77–76, 33 1/2 games behind the Pittsburgh Pirates.

== Offseason ==
The Reds replaced player-manager John Ganzel after one season of managing the club. Ganzel led Cincinnati to a 73–81 record in the 1908 season. His replacement was former New York Highlanders manager Clark Griffith, who had managed the club from 1903 until 1908, posting a 437–370 record. Griffith also pitched with the Highlanders until he retired in 1907. He also was a player-manager with the Chicago White Sox from 1901 to 1902, going 157–113 in his two seasons with the club, and led them to the pennant in 1901.

On December 12, the Reds traded catcher Admiral Schlei to the St. Louis Cardinals, getting pitchers Art Fromme and Ed Karger. Fromme had a 5–13 record with a 2.72 ERA with the Cardinals in 1908, and Karger was 15–19 with a 2.04 ERA in 39 starts.

Cincinnati continued to make moves in the winter months, as on January 18, the team traded outfielder John Kane to the Chicago Cubs for outfielder Blaine Durbin and shortstop Tom Downey. Durbin appeared in only 14 games with the Cubs in 1908, hitting .250 in 32 at-bats. Downey had not yet appeared in majors; however, he was expected to compete with Rudy Hulswitt for the starting shortstop job.

Also on January 18, the Reds acquired outfielder Rebel Oakes from the Los Angeles Angels of the Pacific Coast League in exchange for outfielder Tom Daley and Rube Ellis. Oakes batted .288 with the Angels, and had 212 hits in the 1908 season.

== Regular season ==
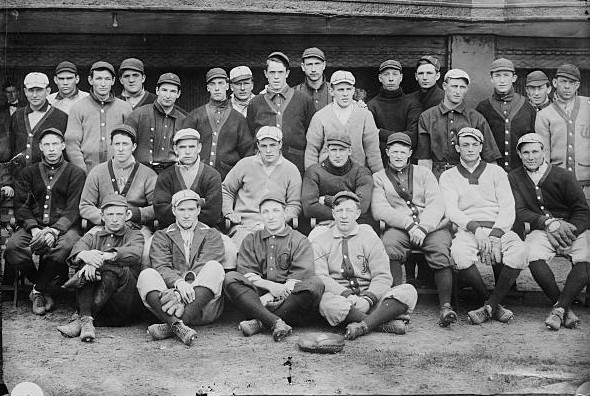
1909 Cincinnati Reds

Newly acquired Tom Downey became the Reds starting shortstop, and the club traded away Rudy Hulswitt to the St. Louis Cardinals on May 2. Downey finished his rookie season with a .231 batting average, hitting one home run and had 32 RBI, while stealing 16 bases in 119 games. Another rookie, Rebel Oakes, hit .270 with three home runs, 31 RBI, and 23 stolen bases in 120 games while playing in the outfield.

Dick Hoblitzell became the Reds starting first baseman, and the 20 year old had a great season, batting .308 with four home runs and 67 RBI in 142 games. Outfielder Mike Mitchell led the Reds with a .310 batting average, while hitting four home runs and a team-high 86 RBI in 145 games. Outfielder Bob Bescher hit .240 and led the Reds with 56 stolen bases.

Newly acquired pitcher Art Fromme anchored the pitching staff, earning a record of 19–13 with a 1.90 ERA in 37 games, pitching a team high 279.1 innings, while throwing 22 complete games. Harry Gaspar also had a great season, going 19–11 with a 2.01 ERA in 44 games.

=== Season summary ===
The Reds got off to a good start in 1909, going 7–2 in their first nine games to take an early division lead. However, the club fell under .500 following a 3-10 stretch, knocking them out of first place. The club eventually rebounded, and through 73 games, the Reds had a 40–33 record, but the club still found themselves in only fourth place, 13.5 games behind the first place Pittsburgh Pirates. Cincinnati would finish the season with a 77–76 record, making it the first time since 1905 that the club finished over .500. They finished in fourth place, 33.5 games behind the Pirates.

=== Season standings ===
National League
Team	W	L	Pct.	GB	Home	Road
Pittsburgh Pirates	110	42	.724	—	56‍–‍21	54‍–‍21
Chicago Cubs	104	49	.680	6½	47‍–‍29	57‍–‍20
New York Giants	92	61	.601	18½	44‍–‍33	48‍–‍28
Cincinnati Reds	77	76	.503	33½	39‍–‍38	38‍–‍38
Philadelphia Phillies	74	79	.484	36½	40‍–‍37	34‍–‍42
Brooklyn Superbas	55	98	.359	55½	34‍–‍45	21‍–‍53
St. Louis Cardinals	54	98	.355	56	26‍–‍48	28‍–‍50
Boston Doves	45	108	.294	65½	27‍–‍47	18‍–‍61

=== Record vs. opponents ===
1909 National League record Sources:
Team	BSN	BRO	CHC	CIN	NYG	PHI	PIT	STL
Boston	—	11–11	1–21	5–17	8–14–2	10–12	1–20	9–13
Brooklyn	11–11	—	5–16	5–17–1	7–15	11–11	4–18	12–10–1
Chicago	21–1	16–5	—	16–6	11–11–1	16–6	9–13	15–7–1
Cincinnati	17–5	17–5–1	6–16	—	9–13–1	9–12–1	7–15–1	12–10
New York	14–8–2	15–7	11–11–1	13–9–1	—	12–10	11–11–1	16–5
Philadelphia	12–10	11–11	6–16	12–9–1	10–12	—	7–15	16–6
Pittsburgh	20–1	18–4	13–9	15–7–1	11–11–1	15–7	—	18–3
St. Louis	13–9	10–12–1	7–15–1	10–12	5–16	6–16	3–18	—

=== Notable transactions ===
- May 28, 1909: Blaine Durbin was traded by the Reds to the Pittsburgh Pirates for Ward Miller and cash.

=== Roster ===
1909 Cincinnati Reds
Roster
Pitchers: Jack Bushelman; Billy Campbell; Tom Cantwell; Chet Carmichael; Roy Castleton; Bill Chappelle; Jean Dubuc; Bob Ewing; Art Fromme; Harry Gaspar; Clark Griffith; Ed Karger; Pat Ragan; Jack Rowan; Ralph Savidge; Bob Spade	Catchers: Tommy Clarke; Emil Haberer; Mike Konnick; Larry McLean; Si Pauxtis; Bunny Pearce; Frank Roth; Infielders: Chick Autry; Chappy Charles; Cozy Dolan; Tom Downey; Dick Egan; Roy Ellam; Dick Hoblitzel; Miller Huggins; Doc Johnston; Hans Lobert; Ezra Midkiff; Bill Moriarty; Mike Mowrey	Outfielders: Bob Bescher; Swat McCabe; Ward Miller; Mike Mitchell; Rebel Oakes; Dode Paskert; Clare Patterson; Del Young; Other positions: Blaine Durbin	Manager: Clark Griffith

== Player stats ==
=== Batting ===
==== Starters by position ====
Note: Pos = Position; G = Games played; AB = At bats; H = Hits; Avg. = Batting average; HR = Home runs; RBI = Runs batted in

Pos	Player	G	AB	H	Avg.	HR	RBI
C	Larry McLean	95	324	83	.256	2	36
1B	Dick Hoblitzell	142	517	159	.308	4	67
2B	Dick Egan	127	480	132	.275	2	53
SS	Tom Downey	119	416	96	.231	1	32
3B	Hans Lobert	122	425	90	.212	4	52
OF	Bob Bescher	124	446	107	.240	1	34
OF	Rebel Oakes	120	415	112	.270	3	31
OF	Mike Mitchell	145	523	162	.310	4	86

==== Other batters ====
Note: G = Games played; AB = At bats; H = Hits; Avg. = Batting average; HR = Home runs; RBI = Runs batted in

Player	G	AB	H	Avg.	HR	RBI
Dode Paskert	104	322	81	.252	0	33
Miller Huggins	57	159	34	.214	0	6
Frank Roth	56	147	35	.238	0	16
Mike Mowrey	38	115	22	.191	0	5
Ward Miller	43	113	35	.310	0	4
Tommy Clarke	18	52	13	.250	0	10
Chappy Charles	13	43	11	.256	0	5
Chick Autry	9	33	6	.182	0	4
Roy Ellam	10	21	4	.190	1	4
Bill Moriarty	6	20	4	.200	0	1
Emil Haberer	5	16	3	.188	0	2
Swat McCabe	3	11	6	.545	0	0
Doc Johnston	3	10	0	.000	0	1
Si Pauxtis	4	8	1	.125	0	0
Clare Patterson	4	8	1	.125	0	1
Del Young	2	7	2	.286	0	1
Cozy Dolan	3	6	1	.167	0	0
Mike Konnick	2	5	2	.400	0	1
Blaine Durbin	6	5	1	.200	0	0
Ezra Midkiff	1	2	0	.000	0	0
Bunny Pearce	2	2	0	.000	0	0

=== Pitching ===
==== Starting pitchers ====
Note: G = Games pitched; IP = Innings pitched; W = Wins; L = Losses; ERA = Earned run average; SO = Strikeouts

Player	G	IP	W	L	ERA	SO
Art Fromme	37	279.1	19	13	1.90	126
Harry Gaspar	44	260.0	19	11	2.01	65
Bob Ewing	31	218.1	11	12	2.43	86
Bob Spade	14	98.0	5	5	2.85	31
Jack Bushelman	1	7.0	0	1	2.57	3
Clark Griffith	1	6.0	0	1	6.00	3

==== Other pitchers ====
Note: G = Games pitched; IP = Innings pitched; W = Wins; L = Losses; ERA = Earned run average; SO = Strikeouts

Player	G	IP	W	L	ERA	SO
Jack Rowan	38	225.2	11	12	2.79	81
Billy Campbell	30	148.1	7	11	2.67	37
Jean Dubuc	19	71.1	2	5	3.66	19
Ed Karger	9	34.1	1	3	4.46	8
Tom Cantwell	6	21.2	1	0	1.66	7
Roy Castleton	4	14.0	1	1	1.93	5

==== Relief pitchers ====
Note: G = Games pitched; W = Wins; L = Losses; SV = Saves; ERA = Earned run average; SO = Strikeouts

Player	G	W	L	SV	ERA	SO
Pat Ragan	2	0	1	0	3.38	2
Chet Carmichael	2	0	0	0	0.00	2
Bill Chappelle	1	0	0	0	2.25	1
Ralph Savidge	1	0	0	0	22.50	2
