= 1912 Oakland Oaks season =

1912 Oakland Oaks
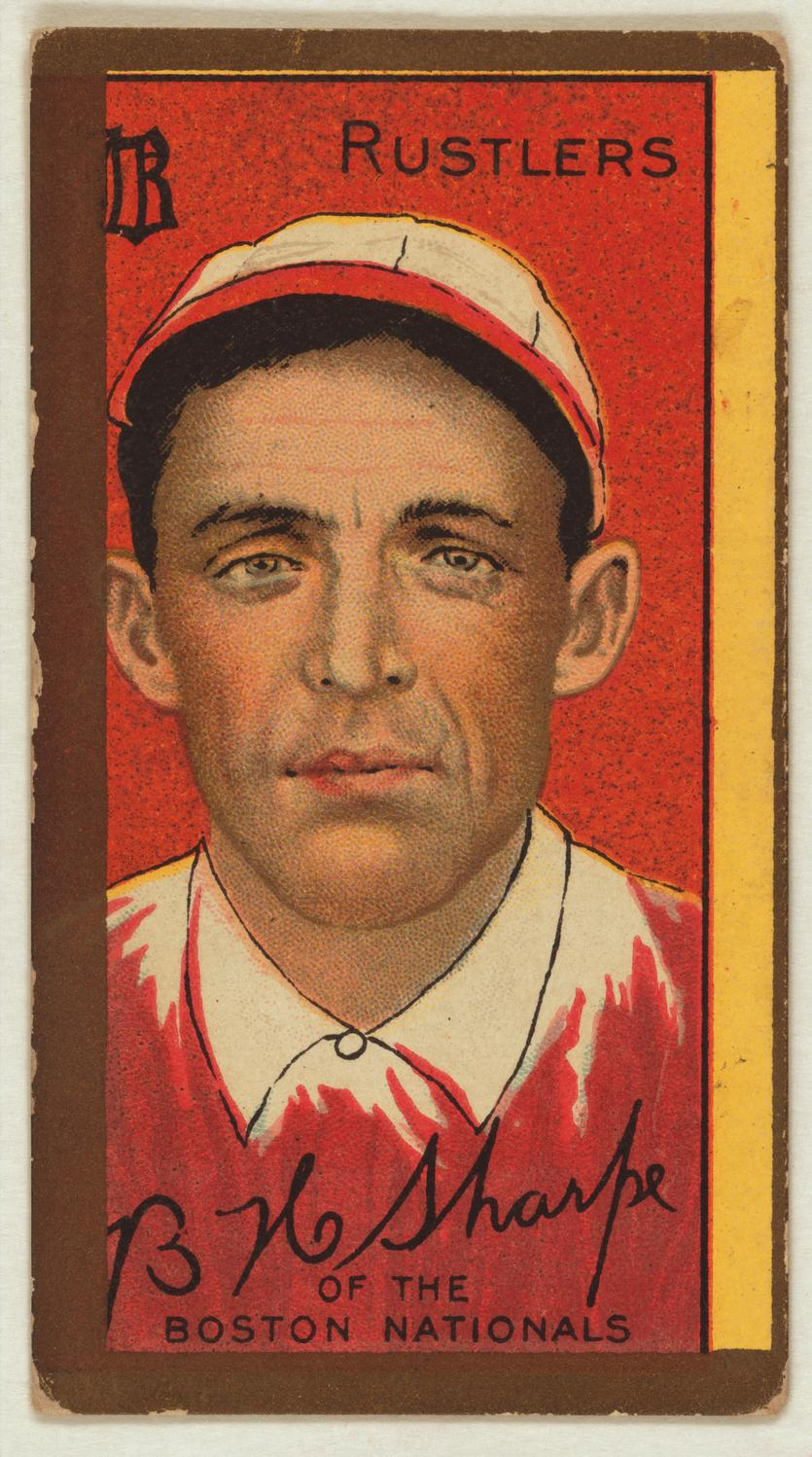
- Player-manager Bud Sharpe
- League: Pacific Coast League
- Ballpark: Freeman's Park
- City: Oakland, California
- Record: 120–83
- League place: 1st
- Managers: Bud Sharpe

The 1912 Oakland Oaks season was the tenth season in the history of the Oakland Oaks baseball team. The team compiled a 120–83 record and won its first Pacific Coast League (PCL) pennant. Bud Sharpe was the team's player-manager.

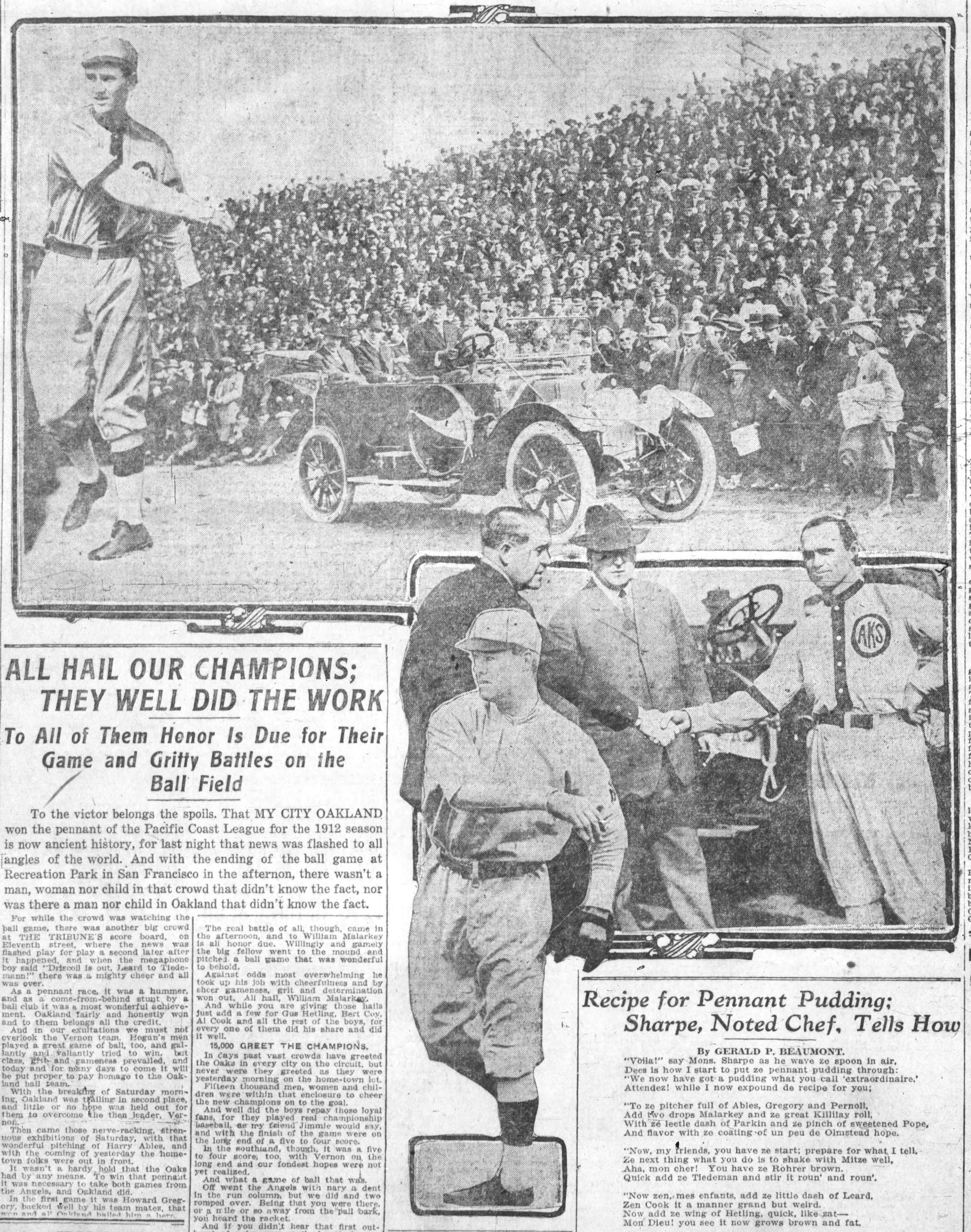
Gus Hetling presented with Chalmers automobile as PCL Most Valuable Player

The Oaks won the pennant by one game over the Vernon Tigers. On October 27, the final day of the season, the Oaks clinched the pennant by sweeping a double-header against the Los Angeles Angels, a morning game at Freeman's Park in Oakland and an afternoon game at Recreation Park in San Francisco. For those unable to attend the games, Oakland's Broadway Theater showed films of both games on the following day.

Third baseman Gus Hetling was voted the most valuable player in the PCL. The team also drew strength from its pitching staff. Harry Ables led the PCL with 25 wins and 303 strikeouts, and Jack Killilay led the league with a .789 winning percentage. Second baseman Bill Leard led the league with 80 stolen bases.

== Management ==
At the end of the 1911 season, Harry Wolverton resigned as the manager of the Oakes. Bud Sharpe, a veteran ballplayer and Pennsylvania native, was hired as the Oaks' player-manager in December 1911. The Oaks had finished in third place in 1911, but under Sharpe's leadership, the team opened the season 13–2, including a 12-game winning streak. Sharpe was also the team's starting first baseman. He appeared in 101 games, compiled a .300 batting average, and stole 30 bases. Among first basemen with at least 60 games at the position, his fielding percentage of .989 was the best in the PCL.

Sharpe was in ill health in the final weeks of the season. He credited catcher and team captain Carl Mitze as having been "the real manager of the team" in the final weeks. Sharpe left Oakland on October 29 and did not return as the team's manager in 1913. Mitze was appointed as player-manager for the 1913 season.

== Pitching ==
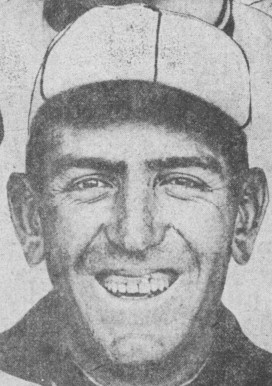
Harry Ables

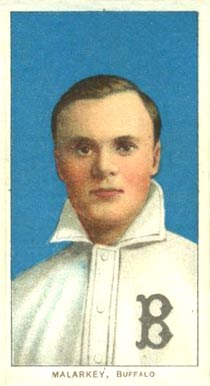
Bill Malarkey

Harry Ables, a Texas native, appeared in 45 games and compiled a 25–18 record with a 2.40 earned run average (ERA). His 25 wins tied for the most in the league. He also led the PCL with 303 strikeouts.

Bill Malarkey, an Illinois native, appeared in 40 games and compiled a 20–11 record and led the team with a 2.14 ERA. He struck out 185 batters.

Jack Killilay, a Kansas native, appeared in 20 games and compiled a 15–4 record with 107 strikeouts and a 2.55 ERA. His .789 winning percentage was the highest in the PCL. At the end of the season, The San Francisco Call declared Killilay "easily the leading pitcher in the Pacific Coast league" whose "work on the mound was instrumental in winning the pennant."

Tyler Christian, a Mississippi native, appeared in 36 games, compiled a 16–10 record, and was among the best-fielding pitchers in the PCL with a .998 fielding percentage.

== Infielders ==
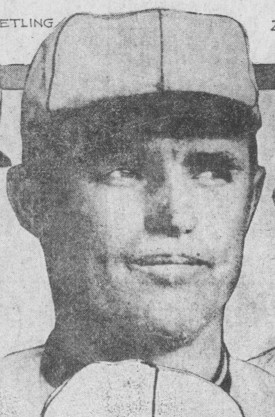
Gus Hetling

John Tiedemann shared the first base spot with Sharpe, appearing in 119 games at the position and compiling a .287 batting average and .988 fielding percentage.

Second baseman Bill Leard appeared in 181 games, led the Oaks with 122 runs scored, and led the league with 80 stolen bases. He also defensive showed range with 537 assists (second most by a PCL second baseman), but committed 59 errors and had the lowest fielding percentage (.932) among the league's second basemen.

Shortstop Al Cook appeared in 198 games and compiled a .248 batting average. He led the league's shortstops with 87 errors and compiled the lowest fielding percentage (.914) among the group.

Third baseman Gus Hetling appeared in 202 games and compiled a .297 batting average. He led the Oaks with 202 hits, scored 95 runs, and stole 33 bases. He also led the PCL third basemen with 255 putouts, 410 assists, and 55 errors. Hetling was voted the most valuable player in the PCL. He was presented with a 1913 Chalmers "36" automobile, valued at $2,100 and billed as "the most valuable trophy ever given on the west coast for an athletic event."

Catcher Carl Mitze appeared in 141 games and compiled a .228 batting average. Defensively, he led the league's catchers in putouts (732), assists (205), and fielding percentage (.984).

== Outfielders ==
Left fielder Clare Patterson appeared in 138 games and led the team with a .305 batting average. Izzy Hoffman shared left field, appearing in 103 games and compiling a .255 batting average.

Center fielder Elmer Zacher appeared in 161 games, compiled a .277 batting average, and hit 11 home runs.

Right fielder Bert Coy appeared in 184 games, compiled a .297 batting average, and led the team with 19 home runs and a .471 slugging percentage. He was also one of the best defensive outfielders in the PCL with 35 assists and a .982 fielding percentage.

== 1912 PCL standings ==
| Team | W | L | Pct. | GB |
|---|---|---|---|---|
| Oakland Oaks | 120 | 83 | .591 | -- |
| Vernon Tigers | 118 | 83 | .587 | 1.0 |
| Los Angeles Angels | 110 | 93 | .542 | |
| San Francisco Seals | 89 | 115 | .436 | |
| Portland Beavers | 85 | 100 | .459 | |
| Sacramento Sacts | 73 | 121 | .376 | |

== Statistics ==
=== Batting ===
Note: Pos = Position; G = Games played; AB = At bats; H = Hits; Avg. = Batting average; HR = Home runs; SLG = Slugging percentage; SB = Stolen bases

| Pos | Player | G | AB | H | Avg. | HR | SLG | SB |
|---|---|---|---|---|---|---|---|---|
| LF | Clare Patterson | 138 | 515 | 157 | .305 | 4 | .404 | 30 |
| 1B | Bud Sharpe | 101 | 357 | 107 | .300 | 1 | .345 | 4 |
| 3B | Gus Hetling | 202 | 708 | 210 | .297 | 2 | .373 | 33 |
| RF | Bert Coy | 184 | 639 | 190 | .297 | 19 | .471 | 25 |
| 1B, RF | John Tiedemann | 140 | 432 | 124 | .287 | 8 | .403 | 8 |
| CF | Elmer Zacher | 161 | 642 | 178 | .277 | 11 | .386 | 21 |
| LF | Izzy Hoffman | 103 | 384 | 98 | .255 | 2 | .359 | 21 |
| SS | Al Cook | 198 | 743 | 179 | .241 | 6 | .316 | 21 |
| 2B | Bill Leard | 181 | 650 | 153 | .235 | 0 | .271 | 80 |
| C | Carl Mitze | 141 | 434 | 99 | .228 | 2 | .281 | 8 |

=== Pitching ===
Note: G = Games pitched; IP = Innings pitched; W = Wins; L = Losses; PCT = Win percentage; ERA = Earned run average; SO = Strikeouts

| Player | G | IP | W | L | PCT | ERA | SO |
|---|---|---|---|---|---|---|---|
| Harry Ables | 45 | 363.0 | 25 | 18 | .581 | 2.40 | 303 |
| Bill Malarkey | 40 | 290.1 | 20 | 11 | .645 | 2.14 | 185 |
| Howie Gregory | 37 | 274.1 | 18 | 14 | .563 | 2.53 | 98 |
| Tyler Christian | 36 | 258.0 | 16 | 10 | .615 | 3.14 | 70 |
| Jack Killilay | 20 | 169.1 | 15 | 4 | .789 | 2.55 | 106 |
| Cy Parkin | 26 | 182.0 | 13 | 8 | .619 | 2.72 | 68 |
