= 1908 St. Louis Cardinals season =

Major League Baseball season

1908 St. Louis Cardinals
- League: National League
- Ballpark: League Park
- City: St. Louis, Missouri
- Record: 49–105 (.318)
- League place: 8th
- Owners: Frank Robison and Stanley Robison
- Managers: John McCloskey

The 1908 St. Louis Cardinals season was the team's 27th season in St. Louis, Missouri and its 17th season in the National League. The Cardinals had a 49–105 win–loss record during the season and finished eighth (last) in the National League. The season's attendance of 185,377, an average of less than 2,500 a game, which remains the lowest peacetime attendance level since 1901. The Cardinals set a Major League record which stills stands for the fewest base on balls by a team in a season, with 282. Additionally, they hold the MLB record for fewest runs scored in a season with 372, averaging only 2.42 runs per contest.

== Regular season ==
=== Season summary ===
The Cardinals ranked last in three categories in the National League: runs scored (only 372), runs allowed (624), and errors committed (349). The team was shut out a record 33 times. Three lineup regulars batted below .200. Only three players drove in more than 20 runs, and the team lost more than 100 games for the second and last time in franchise history. The Cards set a club record with 105 losses and a league record for most defeats in a month when they went 7–27 in September (Brooklyn went 6–27 that same month).

One team member, Bugs Raymond, ranked among the league leaders in fewest hits per nine innings, resulting in a 2.03 ERA. However, the Cardinals were shut out 11 times on days Raymond took the hill, leading to his league-high 25 losses. His 15 wins accounted for almost a third of the team's wins. Of note, he gave up fewer hits per game than Christy Mathewson, and threw five shutouts.

In April 1908, the Cardinals played the St. Louis Browns in an exhibition game to raise money for former Cardinals owner Chris von der Ahe. The clubs raised $4,300.

=== Season standings ===
National League
Team	W	L	Pct.	GB	Home	Road
Chicago Cubs	99	55	.643	—	47‍–‍30	52‍–‍25
New York Giants	98	56	.636	1	52‍–‍25	46‍–‍31
Pittsburgh Pirates	98	56	.636	1	42‍–‍35	56‍–‍21
Philadelphia Phillies	83	71	.539	16	43‍–‍34	40‍–‍37
Cincinnati Reds	73	81	.474	26	40‍–‍37	33‍–‍44
Boston Doves	63	91	.409	36	35‍–‍42	28‍–‍49
Brooklyn Superbas	53	101	.344	46	27‍–‍50	26‍–‍51
St. Louis Cardinals	49	105	.318	50	28‍–‍49	21‍–‍56

=== Record vs. opponents ===
1908 National League record Sources:
Team	BSN	BRO	CHC	CIN	NYG	PHI	PIT	STL
Boston	—	12–10	6–16–2	8–14	6–16	10–12	7–15	14–8
Brooklyn	10–12	—	4–18	6–16	6–16	5–17	9–13	13–9
Chicago	16–6–2	18–4	—	16–6	11–11–1	9–13–1	10–12	19–3
Cincinnati	14–8	16–6	6–16	—	8–14–1	10–12	8–14	11–11
New York	16–6	16–6	11–11–1	14–8–1	—	16–6	11–11–1	14–8
Philadelphia	12–10	17–5	13–9–1	12–10	6–16	—	9–13	14–8
Pittsburgh	15–7	13–9	12–10	14–8	11–11–1	13–9	—	20–2
St. Louis	8–14	9–13	3–19	11–11	8–14	8–14	2–20	—

=== Roster ===
1908 St. Louis Cardinals
Roster
Pitchers: Orson Baldwin; Fred Beebe; Art Fromme; Fred Gaiser; Irv Higginbotham; Ed Karger; Johnny Lush; Stoney McGlynn; Bugs Raymond; Charlie Rhodes; Slim Sallee	Catchers: Jack Bliss; Art Hoelskoetter; Bill Ludwig; Doc Marshall; Charlie Moran; Infielders: Bobby Byrne; Chappy Charles; Billy Gilbert; Ed Konetchy; Walter Morris; Patsy O'Rourke; Champ Osteen; Tom Reilly	Outfielders: Shad Barry; Joe Delahanty; Ralph McLaurin; Wilbur Murdoch; Red Murray; Al Shaw	Manager: John McCloskey

== Player stats ==
=== Batting ===
==== Starters by position ====
Note: Pos = Position; G = Games played; AB = At bats; H = Hits; Avg. = Batting average; HR = Home runs; RBI = Runs batted in

Pos	Player	G	AB	H	Avg.	HR	RBI
C	Bill Ludwig	66	187	34	.182	0	4
1B	Ed Konetchy	154	545	135	.248	5	50
2B	Billy Gilbert	89	276	59	.214	0	10
SS	Patsy O'Rourke	53	164	32	.195	0	16
3B	Bobby Byrne	127	439	84	.191	0	14
OF	Red Murray	154	593	167	.282	7	62
OF	Al Shaw	107	367	97	.264	1	19
OF	Joe Delahanty	140	499	127	.255	1	44

==== Other batters ====
Note: G = Games played; AB = At bats; H = Hits; Avg. = Batting average; HR = Home runs; RBI = Runs batted in

Player	G	AB	H	Avg.	HR	RBI
Chappy Charles	121	454	93	.205	1	17
Shad Barry	74	268	61	.228	0	11
Art Hoelskoetter	62	155	36	.232	0	6
Jack Bliss	44	136	29	.213	1	5
Champ Osteen	29	112	22	.196	0	11
Tom Reilly	29	81	14	.173	1	3
Walter Morris	23	73	13	.178	0	2
Charlie Moran	21	63	11	.175	0	2
Wilbur Murdoch	27	62	16	.258	0	5
Ralph McLaurin	8	22	5	.227	0	0
Doc Marshall	6	14	1	.071	0	1

=== Pitching ===
==== Starting pitchers ====
Note: G = Games pitched; IP = Innings pitched; W = Wins; L = Losses; ERA = Earned run average; SO = Strikeouts

Player	G	IP	W	L	ERA	SO
Bugs Raymond	48	324.1	15	25	2.03	145
Johnny Lush	38	250.2	11	18	2.12	93
Art Fromme	20	116.0	5	13	2.72	62
Charlie Rhodes	4	33.0	1	2	3.00	15
Orson Baldwin	4	14.2	1	3	6.14	5

==== Other pitchers ====
Note: G = Games pitched; IP = Innings pitched; W = Wins; L = Losses; ERA = Earned run average; SO = Strikeouts

Player	G	IP	W	L	ERA	SO
Fred Beebe	29	174.1	5	13	2.63	72
Ed Karger	22	141.1	4	9	3.06	34
Slim Sallee	25	128.2	3	8	3.15	39
Irv Higginbotham	19	107.0	3	8	3.20	38
Stoney McGlynn	16	75.2	1	6	3.45	23

==== Relief pitchers ====
Note: G = Games pitched; W = Wins; L = Losses; SV = Saves; ERA = Earned run average; SO = Strikeouts

Player	G	W	L	SV	ERA	SO
Fred Gaiser	1	0	0	0	7.71	2
