= 1909 Pittsburgh Pirates season =

Major League Baseball season

1909 Pittsburgh Pirates
- World Series champions National League champions
- League: National League
- Ballpark: Exposition Park (since 1891); Forbes Field
- City: Pittsburgh, Pennsylvania (Note: From 1882–1906, the team played in Allegheny, Pennsylvania, which became annexed by Pittsburgh as the North Side in 1907.)
- Owners: Barney Dreyfuss
- Managers: Fred Clarke

The 1909 Pittsburgh (Note: In the early 20th century and earlier, the name of Pittsburgh was spelled both with and without the final 'h'.) Pirates season was the 28th season for the Pittsburgh Pirates franchise, during which they won the National League pennant with a record of 110–42 and their first World Series over the Detroit Tigers. Led by shortstop Honus Wagner and outfielder-manager Fred Clarke, the Pirates scored the most runs in the majors. Wagner led the league in batting average, on-base percentage, slugging percentage, and runs batted in. Pirates owner Barney Dreyfuss opened the Pirates' new ballpark, named Forbes Field, on June 30, 1909.

The Pirates' 110 wins remain a team record, a record they set in the last game of the season by beating the Cincinnati Reds 7–4 in muddy conditions on October 5. It is in fact the best regular season win percentage by any World Series winning team.

== Regular season ==
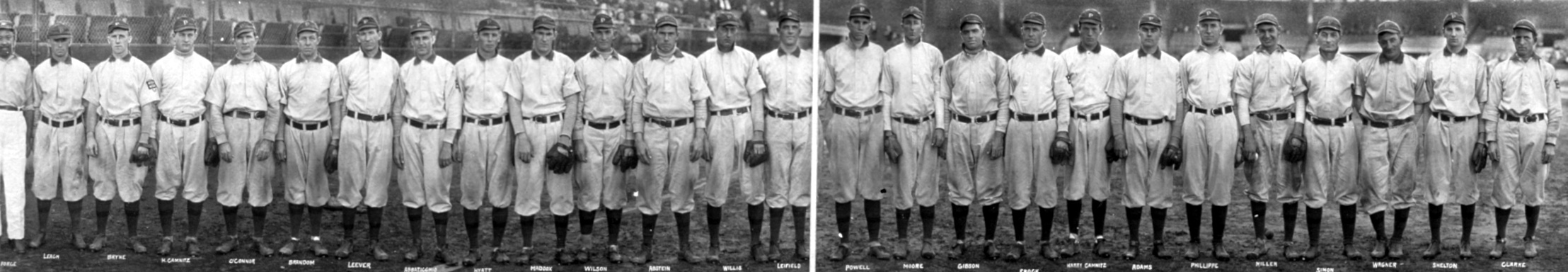

=== Season standings ===
National League
Team	W	L	Pct.	GB	Home	Road
Pittsburgh Pirates	110	42	.724	—	56‍–‍21	54‍–‍21
Chicago Cubs	104	49	.680	6½	47‍–‍29	57‍–‍20
New York Giants	92	61	.601	18½	44‍–‍33	48‍–‍28
Cincinnati Reds	77	76	.503	33½	39‍–‍38	38‍–‍38
Philadelphia Phillies	74	79	.484	36½	40‍–‍37	34‍–‍42
Brooklyn Superbas	55	98	.359	55½	34‍–‍45	21‍–‍53
St. Louis Cardinals	54	98	.355	56	26‍–‍48	28‍–‍50
Boston Doves	45	108	.294	65½	27‍–‍47	18‍–‍61

=== Record vs. opponents ===
1909 National League record Sources:
Team	BSN	BRO	CHC	CIN	NYG	PHI	PIT	STL
Boston	—	11–11	1–21	5–17	8–14–2	10–12	1–20	9–13
Brooklyn	11–11	—	5–16	5–17–1	7–15	11–11	4–18	12–10–1
Chicago	21–1	16–5	—	16–6	11–11–1	16–6	9–13	15–7–1
Cincinnati	17–5	17–5–1	6–16	—	9–13–1	9–12–1	7–15–1	12–10
New York	14–8–2	15–7	11–11–1	13–9–1	—	12–10	11–11–1	16–5
Philadelphia	12–10	11–11	6–16	12–9–1	10–12	—	7–15	16–6
Pittsburgh	20–1	18–4	13–9	15–7–1	11–11–1	15–7	—	18–3
St. Louis	13–9	10–12–1	7–15–1	10–12	5–16	6–16	3–18	—

=== Notable transactions ===
- May 28, 1909: Ward Miller and cash were traded by the Pirates to the Cincinnati Reds for Blaine Durbin.

=== Roster ===
1909 Pittsburgh Pirates
Roster
Pitchers: Babe Adams; Chick Brandom; Harry Camnitz; Howie Camnitz; Sam Frock; Sam Leever; Lefty Leifield; Nick Maddox; Gene Moore; Deacon Phillippe; Bill Powell; Jimmy Wacker; Vic Willis	Catchers: George Gibson; Paddy O'Connor; Mike Simon; Infielders: Ed Abbaticchio; Bill Abstein; Jap Barbeau; Bobby Byrne; Dots Miller; Alan Storke; Honus Wagner	Outfielders: Fred Clarke; Ham Hyatt; Tommy Leach; Ward Miller; Chief Wilson; Other batters: Blaine Durbin	Manager: Fred Clarke

== Player stats ==
= Indicates team leader

=== Batting ===
==== Starters by position ====
Note: Pos = Position; G = Games played; AB = At bats; H = Hits; Avg. = Batting average; HR = Home runs; RBI = Runs batted in

Pos	Player	G	AB	H	Avg.	HR	RBI
C	George Gibson	150	510	135	.265	2	52
1B	Bill Abstein	137	512	133	.260	1	70
2B	Dots Miller	151	560	156	.279	3	87
3B	Jap Barbeau	91	350	77	.220	0	25
SS	Honus Wagner	137	495	168	.339	5	100
OF	Tommy Leach	151	587	153	.261	6	43
OF	Fred Clarke	152	550	158	.287	3	68
OF	Chief Wilson	154	569	155	.272	4	59

==== Other batters ====
Note: G = Games played; AB = At bats; H = Hits; Avg. = Batting average; HR = Home runs; RBI = Runs batted in

Pos	Player	G	AB	H	Avg.	HR	RBI
3B	Bobby Byrne	46	168	43	.256	0	7
1B, 3B	Alan Storke	37	118	30	.254	0	12
2B, SS	Ed Abbaticchio	36	87	20	.230	1	16
1B	Ham Hyatt	49	67	20	.299	0	7
OF	Ward Miller	15	56	8	.143	0	4
C	Mike Simon	12	18	3	.167	0	2
C	Paddy O'Connor	9	16	5	.313	0	3
PR	Blaine Durbin	1	0	0	----	0	0

=== Pitching ===
==== Starting pitchers ====
Note: G = Games pitched; IP = Innings pitched; W = Wins; L = Losses; ERA = Earned run average; SO = Strikeouts

Player	G	IP	W	L	ERA	SO
Vic Willis	39	289.2	22	11	2.24	95
Howie Camnitz	41	283.0	25	6	1.62	133
Nick Maddox	31	203.1	13	8	2.21	56
Lefty Leifield	32	201.2	19	8	2.37	43

==== Other pitchers ====
Note: G = Games pitched; IP = Innings pitched; W = Wins; L = Losses; ERA = Earned run average; SO = Strikeouts

Player	G	IP	W	L	ERA	SO
Deacon Phillippe	22	131.2	8	3	2.32	38
Babe Adams	25	130.0	12	3	1.11	65
Sam Leever	19	70.0	8	1	2.83	23
Chick Brandom	13	40.2	1	0	1.11	21
Sam Frock	8	36.1	2	1	2.48	11
Bill Powell	3	7.1	0	1	3.68	2

==== Relief pitchers ====
Note: G = Games pitched; W = Wins; L = Losses; SV = Saves; ERA = Earned run average; SO = Strikeouts

Player	G	W	L	SV	ERA	SO
Harry Camnitz	1	0	0	0	4.50	1
Charlie Wacker	1	0	0	0	0.00	0
Gene Moore	1	0	0	0	18.00	2

== Awards and honors ==
=== League top five finishers ===
Howie Camnitz

- #2 in NL in wins (25)
- #4 in NL in ERA (1.62)

Fred Clarke

- #2 in NL in runs scored (97)
- #4 in NL in on-base percentage (.384)

Tommy Leach

- MLB leader in runs scored (126)

Dots Miller

- #3 in NL in RBI (87)

Honus Wagner

- NL leader in batting average (.339)
- NL leader in RBI (100)
- NL leader in on-base percentage (.420)
- NL leader in slugging percentage (.489)
- #3 in NL in runs scored (92)

Vic Willis

- #4 in NL in wins (22)

== 1909 World Series ==
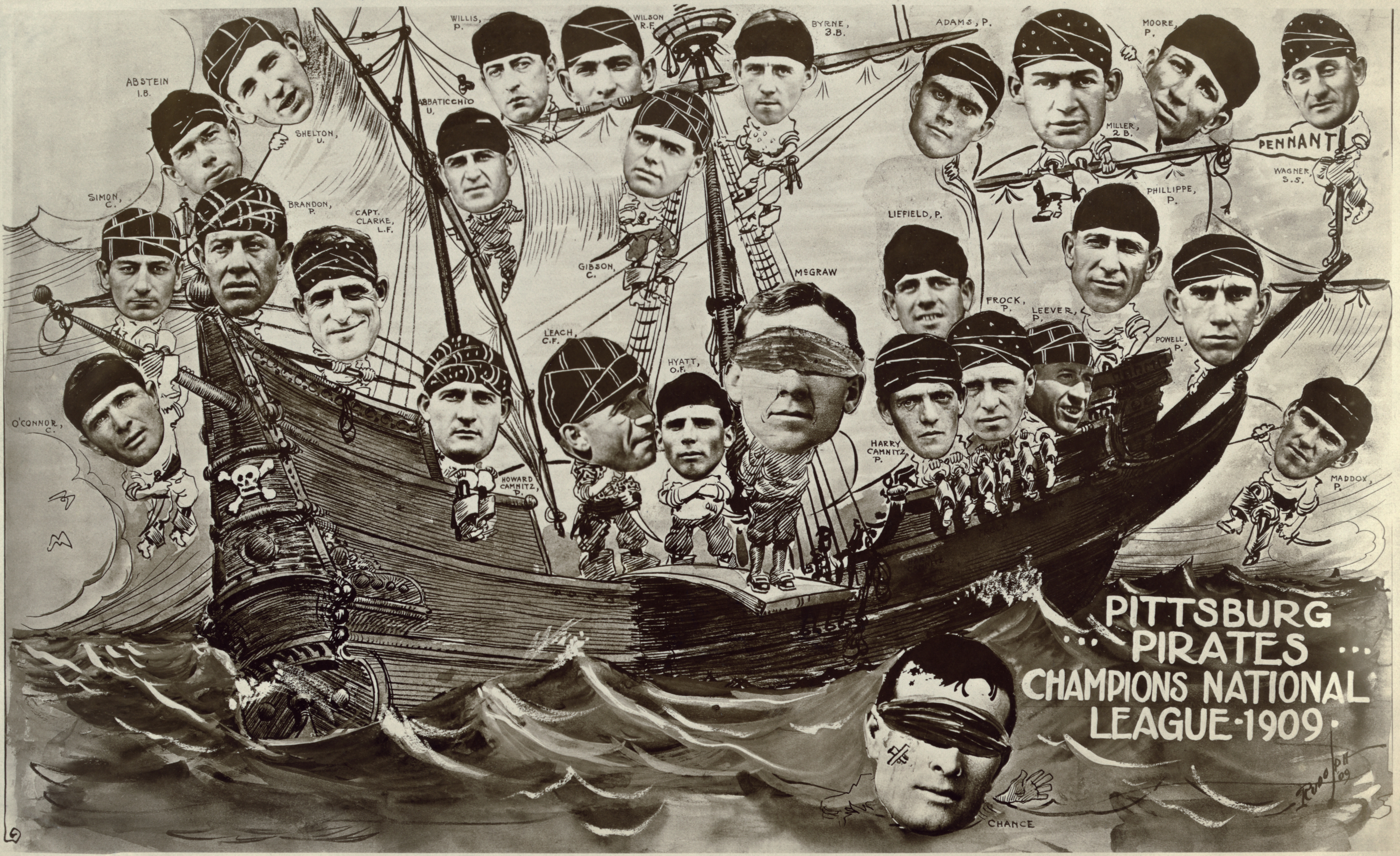
The 1909 Pirates in a poster celebrating their National League pennant. Frank Chance of the Chicago Cubs and John McGraw of the New York Giants, two teams the Pirates beat for the pennant, are being made to walk the plank.

In the World Series, Pittsburgh faced the American League champion Detroit Tigers, led by triple crown winner Ty Cobb. The matchup was largely billed as one between the major leagues' two superstars. Wagner thoroughly outplayed Cobb, and rookie Babe Adams won all three of his starts, as the Pirates won in seven games.

=== Game 1 ===
October 8, 1909, at Forbes Field in Pittsburgh, Pennsylvania

Team	1	2	3	4	5	6	7	8	9	R	H	E
Detroit (AL)	1	0	0	0	0	0	0	0	0	1	6	4
Pittsburgh (NL)	0	0	0	1	2	1	0	0	X	4	5	0
W: Babe Adams (1–0) L: George Mullin (0–1)
HR: PIT – Fred Clarke (1)

=== Game 2 ===
October 9, 1909, at Forbes Field in Pittsburgh, Pennsylvania

Team	1	2	3	4	5	6	7	8	9	R	H	E
Detroit (AL)	0	2	3	0	2	0	0	0	0	7	9	2
Pittsburgh (NL)	2	0	0	0	0	0	0	0	0	2	5	1
W: Bill Donovan (1–0) L: Howie Camnitz (0–1)

=== Game 3 ===
October 11, 1909, at Bennett Park in Detroit, Michigan

Team	1	2	3	4	5	6	7	8	9	R	H	E
Pittsburgh (NL)	5	1	0	0	0	0	0	0	2	8	10	2
Detroit (AL)	0	0	0	0	0	0	4	0	2	6	11	5
W: Nick Maddox (1–0) L: Ed Summers (0–1)

=== Game 4 ===
October 12, 1909, at Bennett Park in Detroit, Michigan

Team	1	2	3	4	5	6	7	8	9	R	H	E
Pittsburgh (NL)	0	0	0	0	0	0	0	0	0	0	5	6
Detroit (AL)	0	2	0	3	0	0	0	0	X	5	8	0
W: George Mullin (1–1) L: Lefty Leifield (0–1)

=== Game 5 ===
October 13, 1909, at Forbes Field in Pittsburgh, Pennsylvania

Team	1	2	3	4	5	6	7	8	9	R	H	E
Detroit (AL)	1	0	0	0	0	2	0	1	0	4	6	1
Pittsburgh (NL)	1	1	1	0	0	0	4	1	X	8	10	2
W: Babe Adams (2–0) L: Ed Summers (0–2)
HR: DET – Davy Jones (1), Sam Crawford (1) PIT – Fred Clarke (2)

=== Game 6 ===
October 14, 1909, at Bennett Park in Detroit, Michigan

Team	1	2	3	4	5	6	7	8	9	R	H	E
Pittsburgh (NL)	3	0	0	0	0	0	0	0	1	4	8	1
Detroit (AL)	1	0	0	2	1	1	0	0	X	5	10	2
W: George Mullin (2–1) L: Vic Willis (0–1)

=== Game 7 ===
October 16, 1909, at Bennett Park in Detroit, Michigan

Team	1	2	3	4	5	6	7	8	9	R	H	E
Pittsburgh (NL)	0	2	0	2	0	3	0	1	0	8	7	0
Detroit (AL)	0	0	0	0	0	0	0	0	0	0	6	3
W: Babe Adams (3–0) L: Bill Donovan (1–1)
