= Hetling =

Hetling is a surname of German origin. Notable people with this surname include:

- Gus Hetling (1885–1962), American baseball player
- John R. Hetling, American professor, ophthalmologist, and bioengineer
- Konrad Meyer-Hetling (1901–1973), German agronomist and SS-Oberführer
- Matt Hongoltz-Hetling, American journalist
- Wilhelm Hetling (1740–1798), Baltic German politician, first mayor of Reval (modern-day Tallinn)
