= Gene Moore =

Gene Moore or Eugene Moore may refer to:

- Eugene Moore (politician) (1942–2016), American politician in Illinois
- Eugene Moore (baseball), American baseball player
- Gene Moore (pitcher) (1885–1938), Major League Baseball pitcher
- Gene Moore (outfielder) (1909–1978), Major League Baseball outfielder
- Gene Moore (basketball) (born 1945), American Basketball Association player
- Gene Moore (window dresser) (1910–1998), store window dresser
