= Ward Miller (baseball) =

American baseball player (1884–1958)

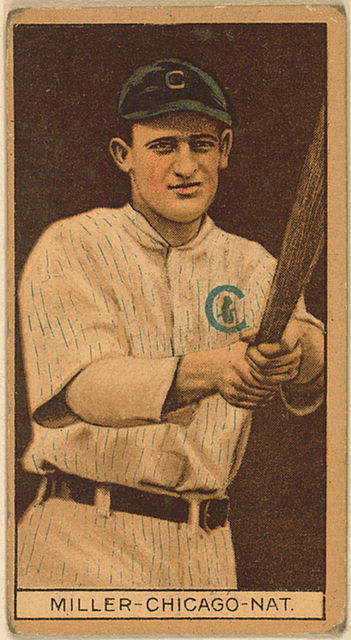
- Outfielder
- Born: July 5, 1884; Mount Carroll, Illinois, U.S.
- Died: September 4, 1958 (aged 74); Dixon, Illinois, U.S.
- Batted: Left Threw: Right

MLB debut
- April 14, 1909, for the Pittsburgh Pirates

Last MLB appearance
- July 15, 1917, for the St. Louis Browns

MLB statistics
- Batting average: .278
- Home runs: 8
- Runs batted in: 225
- Stats at Baseball Reference

Teams
- Pittsburgh Pirates (1909); Cincinnati Reds (1909–1910); Chicago Cubs (1912–1913); St. Louis Terriers (1914–1915); St. Louis Browns (1916–1917)

Ward Taylor Miller (July 4, 1884 – September 4, 1958) was an American professional baseball outfielder. He played in Major League Baseball (MLB) from 1909 to 1917 for the Pittsburgh Pirates, Cincinnati Reds, Chicago Cubs, St. Louis Terriers, and St. Louis Browns.

Miller, a graduate of Northern Illinois University, made his major league debut on April 14, 1909. He played 15 games for the Pittsburgh Pirates during their pennant-winning 1909 season and had a batting average of .143 before he was traded to the Cincinnati Reds along with cash for Blaine Durbin. In 43 games with the Reds during the 1909 season, he hit .310 and had nine stolen bases.

In 769 games over eight seasons, Miller posted a .278 batting average (623-for-2244) with 322 runs, 8 home runs, 225 runs batted in, 128 stolen bases, and 318 bases on balls. Defensively, he recorded a .957 fielding percentage playing at all three outfield positions.
