= 1909 Chicago Cubs season =

1909 Chicago Cubs
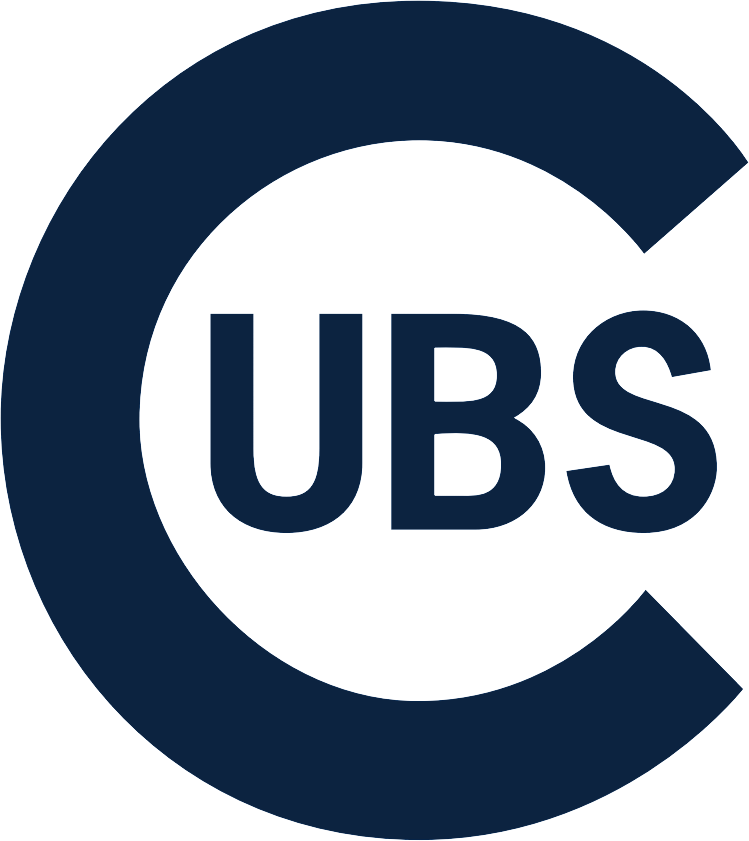
- League: National League
- Ballpark: West Side Park
- City: Chicago
- Record: 104–49 (.680)
- League place: 2nd
- Owners: Charles Murphy
- Managers: Frank Chance

The 1909 Chicago Cubs season was the 38th season of the Chicago Cubs franchise, the 34th in the National League and the 17th at West Side Park. The Cubs won 104 games but finished second in the National League, 6½ games behind the Pittsburgh Pirates. The Cubs had won the pennant the previous three years and would win it again in 1910. Of their 104 victories, 97 were wins for a Cubs starting pitcher; this was the most wins in a season by the starting staff of any major league team from 1908 to the present day. The 104 wins was the most by any team in Major League Baseball history by a team that failed to finish first—a record that would be unbroken for more than a century. The record was equaled by the 1942 Brooklyn Dodgers and eventually broken by the 2021 Dodgers, who won 106 games but finished a game behind the San Francisco Giants in the NL West. To date, the Cubs' 104 wins is the most in Major League Baseball history by a team that failed to make the postseason.

The legendary infield of Joe Tinker, Johnny Evers, Frank Chance, and Harry Steinfeldt was still intact, but it was the pitching staff that excelled. The Cubs pitchers had a collective earned run average of 1.75, a microscopic figure even for the dead-ball era. Three Finger Brown was one of the top two pitchers in the league (with Christy Mathewson) again, going 27–9 with a 1.31 ERA.

== Offseason ==
- February 18, 1909: Doc Marshall was purchased from the Cubs by the Brooklyn Superbas.

== Regular season ==
=== Season standings ===
National League
Team	W	L	Pct.	GB	Home	Road
Pittsburgh Pirates	110	42	.724	—	56‍–‍21	54‍–‍21
Chicago Cubs	104	49	.680	6½	47‍–‍29	57‍–‍20
New York Giants	92	61	.601	18½	44‍–‍33	48‍–‍28
Cincinnati Reds	77	76	.503	33½	39‍–‍38	38‍–‍38
Philadelphia Phillies	74	79	.484	36½	40‍–‍37	34‍–‍42
Brooklyn Superbas	55	98	.359	55½	34‍–‍45	21‍–‍53
St. Louis Cardinals	54	98	.355	56	26‍–‍48	28‍–‍50
Boston Doves	45	108	.294	65½	27‍–‍47	18‍–‍61

=== Record vs. opponents ===
1909 National League record Sources:
Team	BSN	BRO	CHC	CIN	NYG	PHI	PIT	STL
Boston	—	11–11	1–21	5–17	8–14–2	10–12	1–20	9–13
Brooklyn	11–11	—	5–16	5–17–1	7–15	11–11	4–18	12–10–1
Chicago	21–1	16–5	—	16–6	11–11–1	16–6	9–13	15–7–1
Cincinnati	17–5	17–5–1	6–16	—	9–13–1	9–12–1	7–15–1	12–10
New York	14–8–2	15–7	11–11–1	13–9–1	—	12–10	11–11–1	16–5
Philadelphia	12–10	11–11	6–16	12–9–1	10–12	—	7–15	16–6
Pittsburgh	20–1	18–4	13–9	15–7–1	11–11–1	15–7	—	18–3
St. Louis	13–9	10–12–1	7–15–1	10–12	5–16	6–16	3–18	—

=== Roster ===
1909 Chicago Cubs
Roster
Pitchers: Mordecai Brown; Ray Brown; Andy Coakley; King Cole; Chick Fraser; Rip Hagerman; Irv Higginbotham; Rube Kroh; Carl Lundgren; Orval Overall; Jack Pfiester; Pat Ragan; Ed Reulbach; Rudy Schwenck	Catchers: Jimmy Archer; Pat Moran; Tom Needham; Infielders: Frank Chance; Johnny Evers; Del Howard; Fred Luderus; Harry Steinfeldt; Joe Tinker; Heinie Zimmerman	Outfielders: George Browne; Bill Davidson; Solly Hofman; John Kane; Wildfire Schulte; Jimmy Sheckard; Joe Stanley	Manager: Frank Chance

== Player stats ==
=== Batting ===
==== Starters by position ====
Note: Pos = Position; G = Games played; AB = At bats; H = Hits; Avg. = Batting average; HR = Home runs; RBI = Runs batted in

Pos	Player	G	AB	H	Avg.	HR	RBI
C	Jimmy Archer	80	261	60	.230	1	30
1B	Frank Chance	93	324	88	.272	0	46
2B	Johnny Evers	127	463	122	.263	1	24
SS	Joe Tinker	143	516	132	.256	4	57
3B	Harry Steinfeldt	151	528	133	.252	2	59
OF	Jimmy Sheckard	148	525	134	.255	1	43
OF	Solly Hofman	153	527	150	.285	2	58
OF	Frank Schulte	140	538	142	.264	4	60

==== Other batters ====
Note: G = Games played; AB = At bats; H = Hits; Avg. = Batting average; HR = Home runs; RBI = Runs batted in

Player	G	AB	H	Avg.	HR	RBI
Pat Moran	77	246	54	.220	1	23
Del Howard	69	203	40	.197	1	24
Heinie Zimmerman	65	183	50	.273	0	21
Joe Stanley	22	52	7	.135	0	2
John Kane	20	45	4	.089	0	5
George Browne	12	39	8	.205	0	1
Fred Luderus	11	37	11	.297	1	9
Tom Needham	13	28	4	.143	0	0
Bill Davidson	2	7	1	.143	0	0

=== Pitching ===
==== Starting pitchers ====
Note: G = Games pitched; IP = Innings pitched; W = Wins; L = Losses; ERA = Earned run average; SO = Strikeouts

Player	G	IP	W	L	ERA	SO
Mordecai Brown	50	342.2	27	9	1.31	172
Orval Overall	38	285.0	20	11	1.42	205
Ed Reulbach	35	262.2	19	10	1.78	105
Jack Pfiester	29	196.2	17	6	2.43	73
Rube Kroh	17	120.1	9	4	1.65	51
Ray Brown	1	9.0	1	0	2.00	2
King Cole	1	9.0	1	0	0.00	1
Andy Coakley	1	2.0	0	1	18.00	1

==== Other pitchers ====
Note: G = Games pitched; IP = Innings pitched; W = Wins; L = Losses; ERA = Earned run average; SO = Strikeouts

Player	G	IP	W	L	ERA	SO
Rip Hagerman	13	79.0	4	4	1.82	32
Irv Higginbotham	19	78.0	5	2	2.19	32
Rudy Schwenck	3	14.0	1	1	3.86	3
Carl Lundgren	2	4.1	0	1	4.15	0

==== Relief pitchers ====
Note: G = Games pitched; W = Wins; L = Losses; SV = Saves; ERA = Earned run average; SO = Strikeouts

Player	G	W	L	SV	ERA	SO
Pat Ragan	2	0	0	0	2.45	2
Chick Fraser	1	0	0	0	0.00	1

== Awards and honors ==
=== League top five finishers ===
Mordecai Brown

- NL leader in wins (27)
- #2 in NL in ERA (1.31)
- #4 in NL in strikeouts (172)

Orval Overall

- MLB leader in strikeouts (205)
- #3 in NL in ERA (1.42)
