= 1909 New York Giants season =

1909 New York Giants
- League: National League
- Ballpark: Polo Grounds
- City: New York City
- Record: 92–61 (.601)
- League place: 3rd
- Owners: John T. Brush
- Managers: John McGraw

The 1909 New York Giants season was the franchise's 27th season. The team finished in third place in the National League with a 92–61 record, 18½ games behind the Pittsburgh Pirates.

== Regular season ==
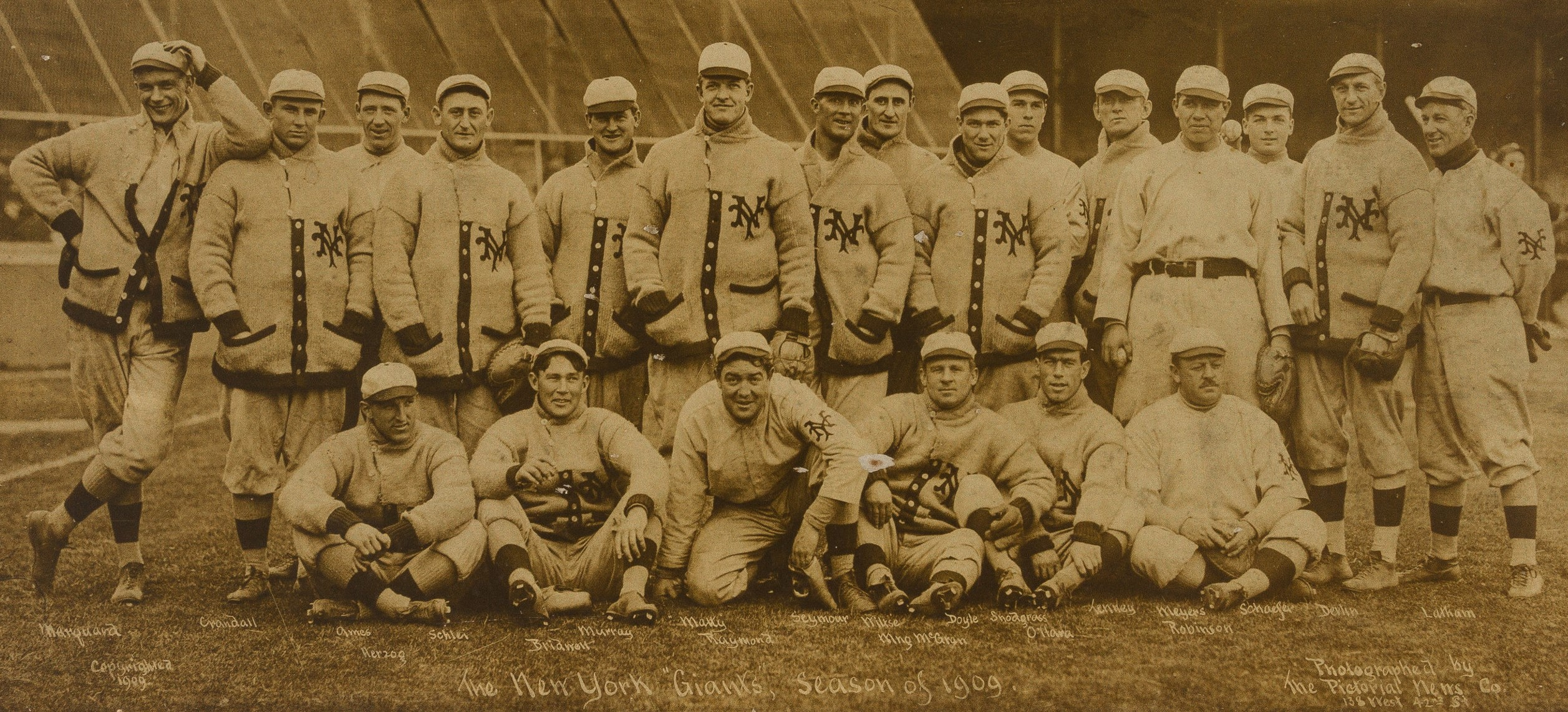
1909 New York Giants

=== Season standings ===
National League
Team	W	L	Pct.	GB	Home	Road
Pittsburgh Pirates	110	42	.724	—	56‍–‍21	54‍–‍21
Chicago Cubs	104	49	.680	6½	47‍–‍29	57‍–‍20
New York Giants	92	61	.601	18½	44‍–‍33	48‍–‍28
Cincinnati Reds	77	76	.503	33½	39‍–‍38	38‍–‍38
Philadelphia Phillies	74	79	.484	36½	40‍–‍37	34‍–‍42
Brooklyn Superbas	55	98	.359	55½	34‍–‍45	21‍–‍53
St. Louis Cardinals	54	98	.355	56	26‍–‍48	28‍–‍50
Boston Doves	45	108	.294	65½	27‍–‍47	18‍–‍61

=== Record vs. opponents ===
1909 National League record Sources:
Team	BSN	BRO	CHC	CIN	NYG	PHI	PIT	STL
Boston	—	11–11	1–21	5–17	8–14–2	10–12	1–20	9–13
Brooklyn	11–11	—	5–16	5–17–1	7–15	11–11	4–18	12–10–1
Chicago	21–1	16–5	—	16–6	11–11–1	16–6	9–13	15–7–1
Cincinnati	17–5	17–5–1	6–16	—	9–13–1	9–12–1	7–15–1	12–10
New York	14–8–2	15–7	11–11–1	13–9–1	—	12–10	11–11–1	16–5
Philadelphia	12–10	11–11	6–16	12–9–1	10–12	—	7–15	16–6
Pittsburgh	20–1	18–4	13–9	15–7–1	11–11–1	15–7	—	18–3
St. Louis	13–9	10–12–1	7–15–1	10–12	5–16	6–16	3–18	—

=== Roster ===
1909 New York Giants
Roster
Pitchers: Red Ames; Doc Crandall; George Daly; Louis Drucke; Bull Durham; Al Klawitter; Rube Marquard; Christy Mathewson; Bugs Raymond; Red Waller; Jake Weimer; Hooks Wiltse	Catchers: Chief Meyers; Admiral Schlei; Art Wilson; Infielders: Al Bridwell; Art Devlin; Larry Doyle; Art Fletcher; Arlie Latham; Fred Merkle; Tillie Shafer; Fred Tenney	Outfielders: Josh Devore; Buck Herzog; Moose McCormick; Red Murray; Bill O'Hara; Cy Seymour; Fred Snodgrass	Manager: John McGraw

== Player stats ==
=== Batting ===
==== Starters by position ====
Note: Pos = Position; G = Games played; AB = At bats; H = Hits; Avg. = Batting average; HR = Home runs; RBI = Runs batted in

Pos	Player	G	AB	H	Avg.	HR	RBI
C	Admiral Schlei	92	279	68	.244	0	30
1B	Fred Tenney	101	375	88	.235	3	30
2B	Larry Doyle	147	570	172	.302	6	49
3B	Art Devlin	143	491	130	.265	0	56
SS	Al Bridwell	145	476	140	.294	0	55
LF	Moose McCormick	121	413	120	.291	3	27
CF	Bill O'Hara	115	360	85	.236	1	30
RF	Red Murray	149	570	150	.263	7	91

==== Other batters ====
Note: G = Games played; AB = At bats; H = Hits; Avg. = Batting average; HR = Home runs; RBI = Runs batted in

Player	G	AB	H	Avg.	HR	RBI
Cy Seymour	80	280	87	.311	1	30
Fred Merkle	79	236	45	.191	0	20
Chief Meyers	90	220	61	.277	1	30
Buck Herzog	42	130	24	.185	0	8
Art Fletcher	33	98	21	.214	0	6
Tillie Shafer	38	84	15	.179	0	7
Fred Snodgrass	28	70	21	.300	1	6
Art Wilson	19	42	10	.238	0	5
Josh Devore	22	28	4	.143	0	1
Arlie Latham	4	2	0	.000	0	0

=== Pitching ===
==== Starting pitchers ====
Note: G = Games pitched; IP = Innings pitched; W = Wins; L = Losses; ERA = Earned run average; SO = Strikeouts

Player	G	IP	W	L	ERA	SO
Christy Mathewson	37	275.1	25	6	1.14	149
Bugs Raymond	39	270.0	18	12	2.47	121
Hooks Wiltse	37	269.1	20	11	2.00	119
Red Ames	34	244.0	15	10	2.69	156
Rube Marquard	29	173.0	5	13	2.60	109
Louis Drucke	3	24.0	2	1	2.25	8
George Daly	3	21.0	0	3	6.00	8

==== Other pitchers ====
Note: G = Games pitched; IP = Innings pitched; W = Wins; L = Losses; ERA = Earned run average; SO = Strikeouts

Player	G	IP	W	L	ERA	SO
Doc Crandall	30	122.0	6	4	2.88	55
Al Klawitter	6	27.0	1	1	2.00	6

==== Relief pitchers ====
Note: G = Games pitched; W = Wins; L = Losses; SV = Saves; ERA = Earned run average; SO = Strikeouts

Player	G	W	L	SV	ERA	SO
Bull Durham	4	0	0	1	3.27	2
Jake Weimer	1	0	0	0	9.00	1
Red Waller	1	0	0	0	0.00	1

== Awards and honors ==
=== League top five finishers ===
Red Ames

- #5 strikeouts (156)

Al Bridwell

- #3 on-base percentage (.386)
- #5 batting average (.294)

Larry Doyle

- #3 slugging percentage (.419)
- #4 batting average (.302)

Christy Mathewson

- #1 earned run average (1.14)
- #2 wins (25)

Moose McCormick

- #5 slugging percentage (.402)

Red Murray

- #1 home runs (7)
- #2 runs batted in (91)
- #2 stolen bases (48)
