= Red Waller =

American baseball player (1883–1915)

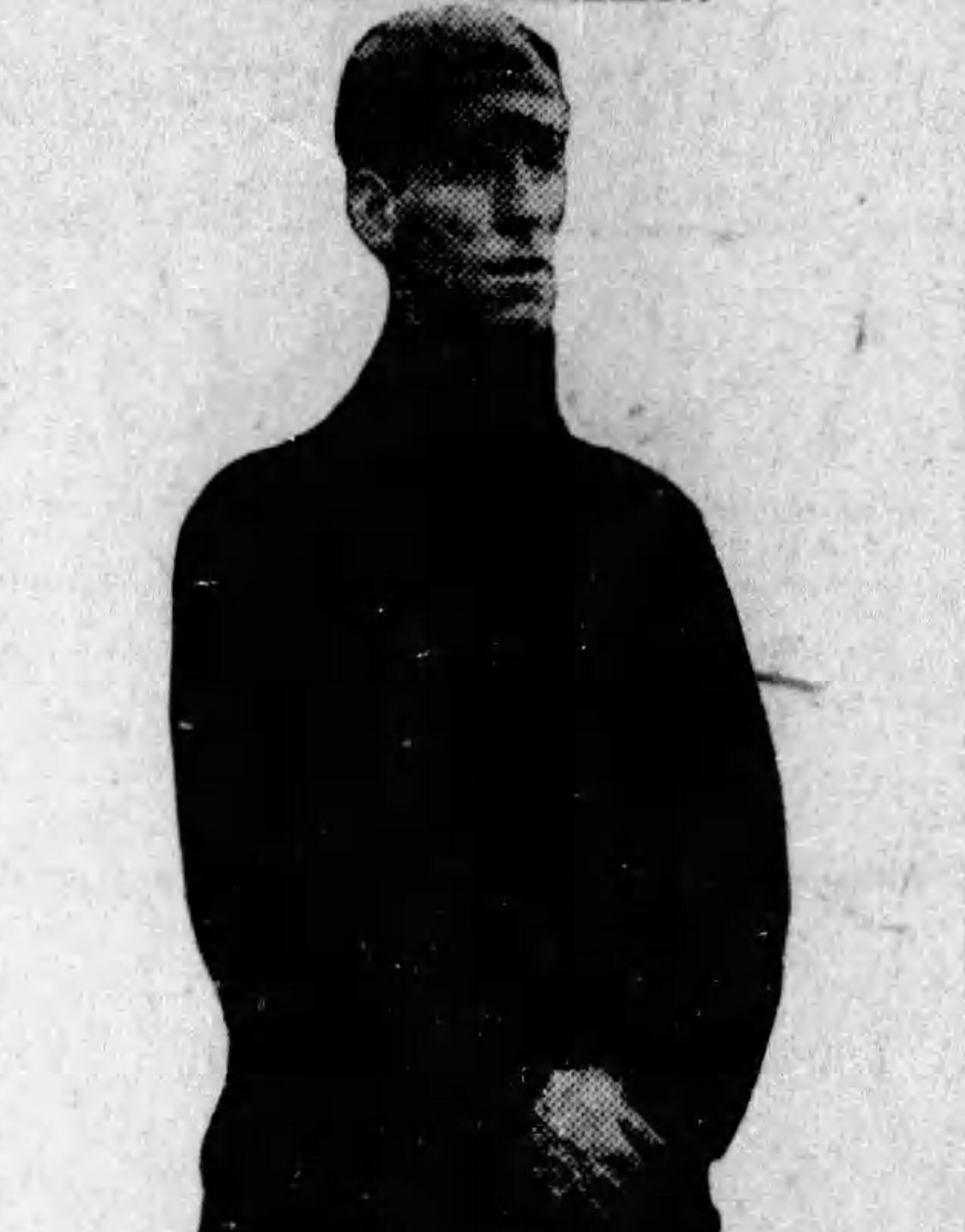
- A photograph of Waller published in a 1915 edition of the Hartford Courant
- Pitcher
- Born: June 16, 1883; Washington, D.C., U.S.
- Died: February 9, 1915 (aged 31); Jersey City, New Jersey, U.S.
- Batted: Unknown Threw: Unknown

MLB debut
- April 27, 1909, for the New York Giants

Last MLB appearance
- April 27, 1909, for the New York Giants

MLB statistics
- Innings pitched: 1.0
- Earned run average: 0.00
- Stats at Baseball Reference

Teams
- New York Giants (1909)

John Francis "Red" Waller (June 16, 1883 – February 9, 1915) was an American Major League Baseball pitcher who played for one season. He pitched for the New York Giants for one game on April 27 during the 1909 New York Giants season. He pitched one inning, allowing two runs, neither of them earned.

An obituary of Waller in the Hartford Courant described him as "one of the greatest minor league pitchers that ever hurled a ball" but added that "failure to take care of himself cost him his chance for major league fame." He died at just 31 years old and left behind a wife and 8-year-old son in Jersey City, New Jersey.
