= Bill Moriarty (baseball) =

American baseball player (1883–1916)

- Shortstop
- Born: August 24, 1883; Chicago, Illinois, U.S.
- Died: December 25, 1916 (aged 33); Elgin, Illinois, U.S.
- Batted: Right Threw: Right

MLB debut
- April 29, 1909, for the Cincinnati Reds

Last MLB appearance
- May 3, 1909, for the Cincinnati Reds

MLB statistics
- Batting average: .200
- Home runs: 0
- Runs batted in: 1
- Stats at Baseball Reference

Teams
- Cincinnati Reds (1909)

William Joseph Moriarty (August 24, 1883 – December 25, 1916) was an American Major League Baseball player. He played shortstop in six games for the 1909 Cincinnati Reds. His brother, George Moriarty was also a professional baseball player.
