= Tom Cantwell =

American baseball player (1888–1968)

- Pitcher
- Born: December 23, 1888; Washington, D.C., U.S.
- Died: April 1, 1968 (aged 79); Washington, D.C., U.S.
- Batted: Right Threw: Right

MLB debut
- May 19, 1909, for the Cincinnati Reds

Last MLB appearance
- May 24, 1910, for the Cincinnati Reds

MLB statistics
- Win–loss record: 1–0
- Strikeouts: 7
- Earned run average: 2.35
- Stats at Baseball Reference

Teams
- Cincinnati Reds (1909–1910)

Thomas Aloysius Cantwell (December 23, 1888 – April 1, 1968) was an American Major League Baseball pitcher for the 1909-10 Cincinnati Reds.

In 1914 he founded T.A. Cantwell and Co., a paper company in Washington DC. In the 1920s, Thomas Cantwell would be joined by William Cleary, and the company would be renamed Cantwell-Cleary Packaging. This company, by the same name, is still successfully serving the Baltimore to Richmond region.
