= Harry Ables =

American baseball player (1883-1951)

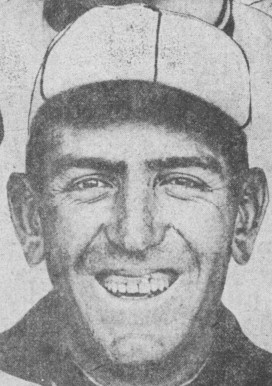
- Pitcher
- Born: October 4, 1883; Terrell, Texas, U.S.
- Died: February 8, 1951 (aged 67); San Antonio, Texas, U.S.
- Batted: Right Threw: Left

MLB debut
- September 2, 1905, for the St. Louis Browns

Last MLB appearance
- May 5, 1911, for the New York Highlanders

MLB statistics
- Win–loss record: 1–5
- Earned run average: 4.04
- Strikeouts: 41
- Stats at Baseball Reference

Teams
- St. Louis Browns (1905); Cleveland Naps (1909); New York Highlanders (1911)

Harry Terrell Ables (October 4, 1883 – February 8, 1951) was an American Major League Baseball pitcher for three seasons. Ables attended Southwestern University.

Ables was from Terrell, Texas and originally played for the Dallas Giants. On 30 July 1905 he threw two complete shut-outs and then moved to the St. Louis Browns. He moved to the Cleveland Naps in 1909 and the New York Highlanders in 1911. He died from lung cancer in San Antonio on 8 February 1951 and was buried there at the San Jose Burial Park.

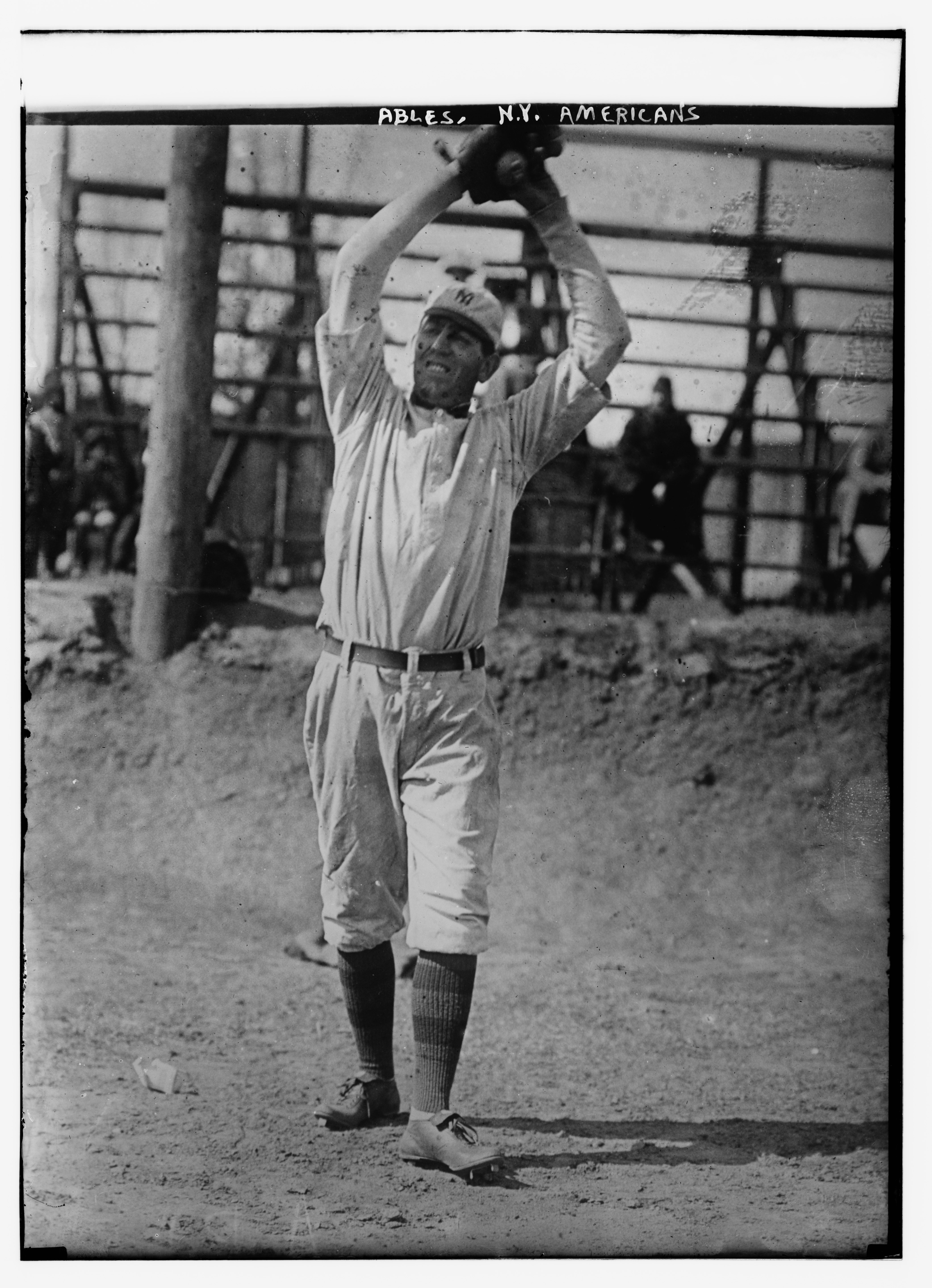
