= Ralph McLaurin =

American baseball player (1885–1943)

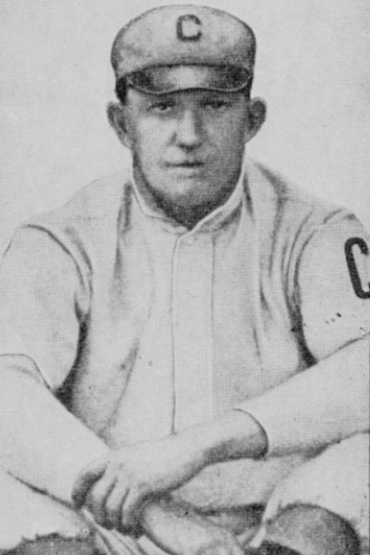
- Outfielder
- Born: May 23, 1885; Kissimmee, Florida, U.S.
- Died: February 11, 1943 (aged 57); McColl, South Carolina, U.S.
- Batted: Unknown Threw: Unknown

MLB debut
- September 5, 1908, for the St. Louis Cardinals

Last MLB appearance
- October 4, 1908, for the St. Louis Cardinals

MLB statistics
- Batting average: .227
- Home runs: 0
- Runs batted in: 0
- Stats at Baseball Reference

Teams
- St. Louis Cardinals (1908)

Ralph Edgar McLaurin (May 23, 1885 – February 11, 1943) was an American Major League Baseball outfielder who played in eight games for the 1908 St. Louis Cardinals.

McLaurin had a strong reputation as a fielder. He was described in The Charlotte Observer in 1909 as "one of the best outfielders in the South Atlantic," in the Fort Worth Star-Telegram in 1917 as "a corking good fielder," and in the Chattanooga Daily Times in 1921 as "a superb fielder."

In 1917, he was traded by the Fort Worth Panthers to the Shreveport Gassers for future Major Leaguer Hod Leverette. He opted to retire from baseball rather than play for Shreveport.
