= Rudy Schwenck =

American baseball player (1884–1941)

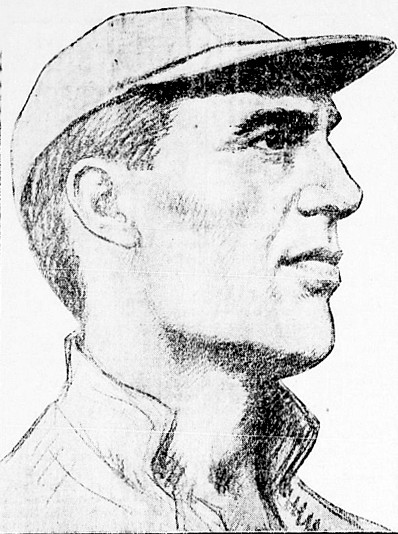
- Pitcher
- Born: April 6, 1884; Louisville, Kentucky, U.S.
- Died: November 27, 1941 (aged 57); Anchorage, Kentucky, U.S.
- Batted: Left Threw: Left

MLB debut
- September 23, 1909, for the Chicago Cubs

Last MLB appearance
- October 6, 1909, for the Chicago Cubs

MLB statistics
- Win–loss record: 1–1
- Earned run average: 3.86
- Strikeouts: 3
- Stats at Baseball Reference

Teams
- Chicago Cubs (1909)

Rudolph Christian Schwenck (April 6, 1884 – November 27, 1941) was an American pitcher in Major League Baseball who played briefly for the Chicago Cubs during the 1909 season. Listed at 6 ft 0 in (1.83 m), 174 lb., Schwenck batted and threw left-handed. He was born in Louisville, Kentucky.

Prior to the 1909 season, Schwenck, who had been pitching for the Memphis Turtles of the Southern Association, told manager Charlie Babb that he would not be returning to baseball that year and would instead be sticking with his job at a distillery outside of Cincinnati. His decision was reportedly based on dissatisfaction with his pay and his belief that younger pitchers were being paid more. An Alabama newspaper article speculated that Schwenck was simply "a sensitive chap at best, and maybe his feelings were hurt" and further argued that, by sticking to the whiskey business, he was passing up on "a golden opportunity to get to the big leagues."

By mid-May, it was reported that Schwenck had expressed an interest in returning to the club. On May 21, with Memphis in last place, Schwenck returned to the team's pitching staff. Despite joining the team midseason, Schwenck started the season with a streak of 57 scoreless innings. That streak was snapped on July 16 in a one-run outing against the Little Rock Travelers. His success earned him the attention of several big league clubs including the Cubs, who purchased his services from Memphis for $2,000.

In a one-season career, Schwenck posted a 1–1 record with a 13.50 earned run average in three appearances, including two starts, giving up six earned runs on 16 hits and three walks while striking out three in 14 innings of work.

Schwenck died in Anchorage, Kentucky, at the age of 57.
