= Patsy O'Rourke =

American baseball player (1881–1956)

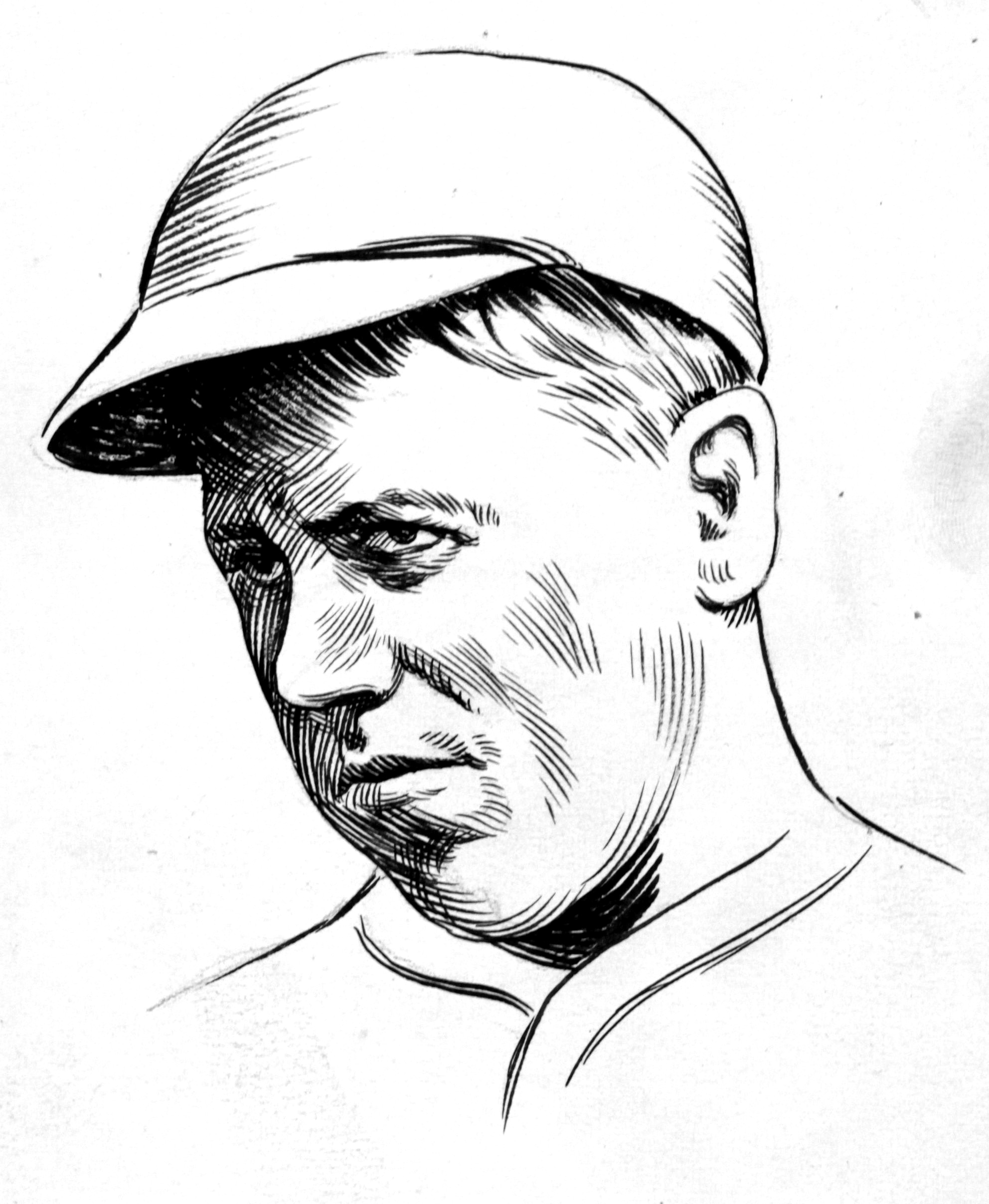
- Shortstop
- Born: April 13, 1881; Philadelphia, Pennsylvania, U.S.
- Died: April 18, 1956 (aged 75); Philadelphia, Pennsylvania, U.S.
- Batted: Right Threw: Right

MLB debut
- April 16, 1908, for the St. Louis Cardinals

Last MLB appearance
- July 12, 1908, for the St. Louis Cardinals

MLB statistics
- Batting average: .195
- Home runs: 0
- Runs batted in: 16
- Stats at Baseball Reference

Teams
- St. Louis Cardinals (1908)

Joseph Leo "Patsy" O'Rourke Sr. (April 13, 1881 – April 18, 1956) was an American Major League Baseball (MLB) shortstop who played in 53 games for the 1908 St. Louis Cardinals. He later managed in the minor leagues. He was the father of long time minor league player and Major League scout Joe O'Rourke who made an appearance with the Phillies in 1929.

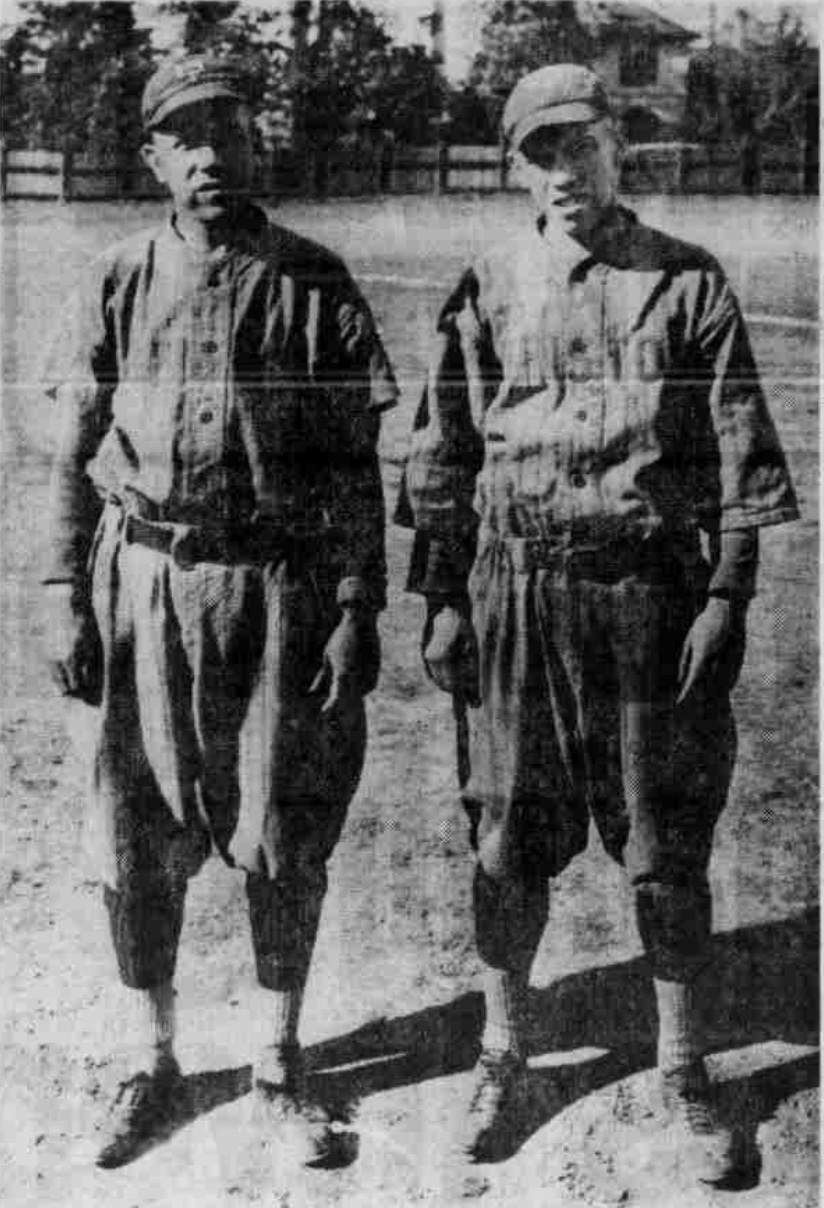
Patsy (L) and Joe O'Rourke (R) in 1924 with Bristol, Appalachian League for which Patsy managed, and Joe Jr played infield

On June 9, 1908, O'Rourke returned to Philadelphia as a member of the Cardinals to play the Phillies at National League Park. It was reported that a large contingent of fans from O'Rourke's Port Richmond neighborhood came out to the game, cheered every time he touched the ball, and when he came to bat in the second inning, presented him with a watch which included an acknowledgement from the local Commodore Barry amateur baseball team with whom he had played in 1907.

As a minor league player in 1910, O'Rourke recommended that the Phillies sign Grover Cleveland Alexander. The team would reward O'Rourke with $100 and two tickets to the 1915 World Series. O'Rouke was also credited with signing Chuck Klein to the Phillies on the recommendation of his son who had faced Klein in the minor leagues.
