= George Daly (baseball) =

American baseball player (1887-1957)

- Pitcher
- Born: July 28, 1887; Buffalo, New York
- Died: December 12, 1957 (aged 70); Buffalo, New York
- Batted: Right Threw: Right

MLB debut
- September 26, 1909, for the New York Giants

Last MLB appearance
- October 7, 1909, for the New York Giants

MLB statistics
- Win/Loss Record: 0-3
- Earned run average: 6.00
- strikeouts: 8
- Stats at Baseball Reference

Teams
- New York Giants (1909)

George Josephs Daly (July 28, 1887 – December 12, 1957), nicknamed "Pecks", was a Major League Baseball pitcher who played for the New York Giants in its 1909 season. He attended St. Bonaventure University.
