= Al Klawitter =

American baseball player (1889–1950)

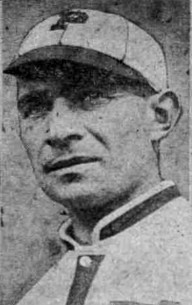
- Pitcher
- Born: March 20, 1889; Wilkes-Barre, Pennsylvania, U.S.
- Died: May 2, 1950 (aged 61); Milwaukee, Wisconsin, U.S.
- Batted: Right Threw: Right

MLB debut
- September 20, 1909, for the New York Giants

Last MLB appearance
- May 30, 1913, for the Detroit Tigers

MLB statistics
- Win–loss record: 2-3
- Earned run average: 4.20
- Saves: 1
- Complete games: 3
- Strikeouts: 16
- Stats at Baseball Reference

Teams
- New York Giants (1909–1910); Detroit Tigers (1913)

Al Klawitter (born Albert Hermann Klawitter) (March 20, 1889 - May 2, 1950) was an American Major League Baseball pitcher. Klawitter played two seasons with the New York Giants before playing his final season with the Detroit Tigers.

== Pro Career ==
Al Klawitter made his professional debut as a 19 year old in 1908, pitching for the Vicksburg Hill Climbers of the Cotton States League. Klawitter went 15-10 for Vicksburg, which finished second to the Jackson Senators. It would be Klawitter's only season in Vicksburg, as the Cotton States League dissolved at the conclusion of the season. From there it was off to the Shreveport Pirates of the Texas League, a Class C minor league. Shreveport was led by manager Dale Gear, a former pitcher and outfielder in the major leagues. Klawitter led the Pirates with 13 wins, but the team overall lacked talent, finished fifth out of eight teams. The New York Giants thought enough of Klawitter's talents that they promoted him to the major leagues later that 1909 season. In his rookie season in the majors, Klawitter went 1-1 with an E.R.A. of 2.00. The Giants gave Klawitter another chances at the major leagues in 1910. Klawitter didn't fare so well, as he failed to record a single out. After his lone appearance, the Giants optioned Klawitter and his 9.00 E.R.A. back to Memphis of the Southern League.

Klawitter took his talents to the Pacific Coast League. The PCL was viewed at the time as an unofficial third major league, though it held class AA classification. He was 23-14 for Portland in 1912, and 18-14 for Sacramento in 1913. The Detroit Tigers were impressed enough, they purchased his contract, and Klawitter finished 1913 in the American league. Klawitter went 1-2 for a sixth place Tigers team that was led by manager Hughie Jennings and outfielder Ty Cobb. It proved to be Klawitter's swan song in the majors, as he was released by the Tigers during the off season.

Klawitter split 1914 between Sacramento and the Oakland Oaks. He played the entire1915 and 1916 seasons for the Oaks, before playing with Salt Lake City in 1917. At the conclusion of the 1917 season, at just 27 years old, Klawitter opted to retire from professional baseball.
