= Ray Brown (National League pitcher) =

American baseball player (1889–1955)

- Pitcher
- Born: January 31, 1889; Chicago, Illinois, U.S.
- Died: May 29, 1955 (aged 66); Los Angeles, California, U.S.
- Batted: Right Threw: Right

MLB debut
- September 29, 1909, for the Chicago Cubs

Last MLB appearance
- September 30, 1909, for the Chicago Cubs

MLB statistics
- Win–loss record: 1–0
- Earned run average: 2.00
- Strikeouts: 2
- Stats at Baseball Reference

Teams
- Chicago Cubs (1909)

Paul Percival "Ray" Brown (January 31, 1889 – May 29, 1955) was an American right-handed pitcher in Major League Baseball for the Chicago Cubs.

Brown pitched in just one big-league game, twirling a complete-game victory over the Philadelphia Phillies on September 29, 1909, at age 20. He allowed just five hits to the Phillies, walking four and striking out two in his single day on the mound at West Side Park. At the plate, he had no hits in three at-bats, but did earn a run batted in. By virtue of his brief moment in the spotlight, Brown became the tenth-youngest man to play in the National League in 1909.
