= Bill Malarkey (baseball) =

American baseball player (1878–1956)

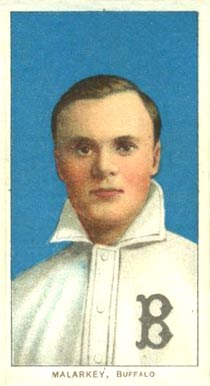
- Pitcher
- Born: November 26, 1878; Port Byron, Illinois, U.S.
- Died: December 12, 1956 (aged 78); Phoenix, Arizona, U.S.
- Batted: Right Threw: Right

MLB debut
- April 16, 1908, for the New York Giants

Last MLB appearance
- August 16, 1908, for the New York Giants

MLB statistics
- Win–loss record: 0-2
- Earned run average: 2.57
- Strikeouts: 12
- Stats at Baseball Reference

Teams
- New York Giants (1908)

William John Malarkey (November 26, 1878 – December 12, 1956) was an American pitcher in Major League Baseball.

Malarkey's only season in the majors was 1908, when he pitched 35 innings for the New York Giants. He played in the minor leagues until 1915, winning a career-high 25 games in 1913.
