= Tom Reilly (baseball) =

American baseball player (1884–1918)

- Shortstop
- Born: August 3, 1884; St. Louis, Missouri, U.S.
- Died: October 18, 1918 (aged 34); New Orleans, Louisiana, U.S.
- Batted: Right Threw: Right

MLB debut
- July 27, 1908, for the St. Louis Cardinals

Last MLB appearance
- July 3, 1914, for the Cleveland Naps

MLB statistics
- Batting average: .180
- Home runs: 1
- Runs batted in: 5
- Stats at Baseball Reference

Teams
- St. Louis Cardinals (1908–1909); Cleveland Naps (1914)

Thomas Henry Reilly (August 3, 1884 – October 18, 1918) was an American right-handed Major League Baseball shortstop who played for three seasons. He played for the St. Louis Cardinals from 1908 to 1909 and the Cleveland Naps in 1914. He played his first game on July 27, 1908, and his last game on July 3, 1914.

He was born in St. Louis, Missouri and died of pneumonia in New Orleans, Louisiana.
