= Lefty Leifield =

American baseball player (1883–1970)

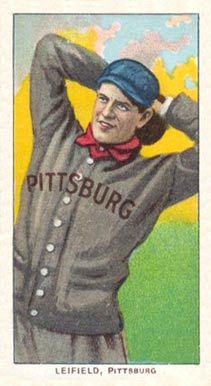
- Pitcher
- Born: September 5, 1883; Trenton, Illinois, U.S.
- Died: October 10, 1970 (aged 87); Fairfax, Virginia, U.S.
- Batted: Left Threw: Left

MLB debut
- September 3, 1905, for the Pittsburgh Pirates

Last MLB appearance
- September 24, 1920, for the St. Louis Browns

MLB statistics
- Win–loss record: 124–97
- Earned run average: 2.47
- Strikeouts: 616
- Stats at Baseball Reference

Teams
- Pittsburgh Pirates (1905–1912); Chicago Cubs (1912–1913); St. Louis Browns (1918–1920)

Career highlights and awards
- World Series champion (1909)

Albert Peter "Lefty" Leifield (September 5, 1883 – October 10, 1970) was an American Major League Baseball pitcher with the Pittsburgh Pirates, Chicago Cubs and the St. Louis Browns between 1905 and 1920. He batted and threw left-handed.

== Baseball career ==
In 1905, Leifield was the ace of the Western League's Des Moines Underwriters, winning 26 games to help the Underwriters take the pennant. In September, Pittsburgh Pirates' owner Barney Dreyfuss purchased his contract for $2,500. Leifield pitched a shutout in his major league debut.

From 1906 to 1911, Leifield stayed in the Pittsburgh starting rotation, winning 15 or more games each season. In 1909, he went 19-8 to help the Pirates win the National League pennant. He was traded to the Chicago Cubs in 1912.

On July 4, 1906, in the first game of a doubleheader at Exposition Park, Leifield lost a double one-hitter to Mordecai Brown and the Chicago Cubs, 1-0 (1 of only 5 double one-hitters in major league history, 4 since 1901). Leifield had a no-hitter going into the 9th inning but gave up a run on a hit and an error. Leifield's own single was the only hit for the Pirates. He would be the only pitcher in MLB history to lose a decision despite throwing at least nine innings with one or fewer hits and no walks allowed, until Rich Hill of the Los Angeles Dodgers gave up a walk-off home run to Josh Harrison of the Pittsburgh Pirates on August 23, 2017. Coincidentally, the game was held at PNC Park, which is located near where Exposition Park once stood.

After being released in 1913, Leifield returned home, and then went to San Francisco, California to pitch in the Pacific Coast League. In 1915, he went to spring training with the Pirates but instead played for the St. Paul Saints of the American Association. On August 20, he struck out 15 in a game for the Saints.

In 1918, Leifield returned to the majors as a player-coach for the St. Louis Browns, and then as a full-time coach for the Boston Red Sox and Detroit Tigers. He finished his major league career with 124 wins.

Leifield died in Fairfax, Virginia at the age of 87.

He was the last surviving member of the 1909 World Champion Pittsburgh Pirates.

== See also ==
- List of Major League Baseball career hit batsmen leaders
