= John R. Hetling =

American academic

John R. Hetling is an associate professor at the University of Illinois at Chicago in the Richard and Loan Hill Department of Bioengineering and department of ophthalmology and visual sciences. He is also the director of undergraduate studies for the department of bioengineering and the director of the Neural Engineering Vision Laboratory at UIC, and chief science officer of RetMap, Inc. At UIC, Hetling developed the first undergraduate course track in neural engineering, and in 2008, he and his students authored a widely accepted definition of the field.

== Education ==
After graduating from Bates College in 1989 with a degree in biology, Hetling worked for two years in the neuroelectrophysiology laboratory of Patsy Dickinson at Bowdoin College studying rhythmic motor pattern generation. He then began his PhD at UIC in 1991 in the laboratory of David R. Pepperberg, which he completed in 1997. Following his PhD he did a postdoctoral fellowship in the Department of Ophthalmology and Visual Sciences at UIC before being named a visiting assistant professor in the department of bioengineering, also at UIC. Hetling began his tenure track faculty position as an assistant professor at UIC in 1998.

== Career ==
Hetling is an expert on the electrophysiology of vision, with accomplishments in retinal prosthesis and electrical stimulation therapy for retinal disease, leading to invited book chapters in leading Neural Engineering textbooks and earning the Excellence in Neural Engineering Award early in his academic career. He has published extensively in the field. His main impact is the development of new diagnostic technologies for degenerative eye diseases, where he pioneered the idea of examining the peripheral retina for early signs of disease. He developed the enabling technology behind multi-electrode electroretinography (meERG), with two issued US patents, both under commercial license. He also developed the enabling technology behind peripheral pattern electroretinography (ppERG), with two international patents pending.

Hetling also co-developed the first odor-detection system capable of identifying airborne odors in real time, and has patents pending for developing technologies related to clinical electrophysiology and therapeutic hypothermia.

== Family ==
He is the brother of journalist Matt Hongoltz-Hetling.
