= Bud Sharpe =

American baseball player (1881–1916)

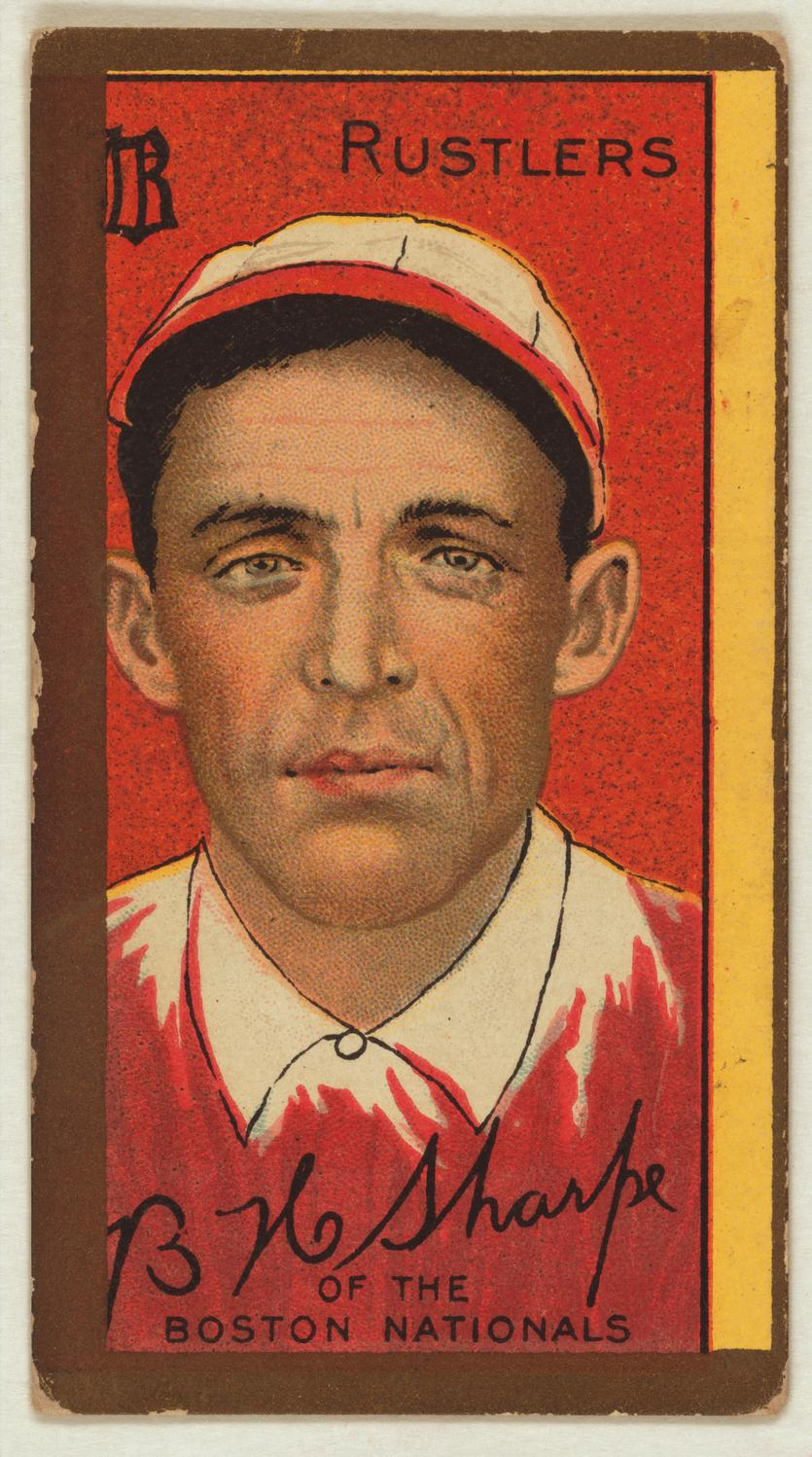
- Bud Sharpe baseball card, 1911
- First baseman
- Born: August 6, 1881; West Chester, Pennsylvania, U.S.
- Died: May 31, 1916 (aged 34); Haddock, Georgia, U.S.
- Batted: Left Threw: Right

MLB debut
- April 14, 1905, for the Boston Beaneaters

Last MLB appearance
- September 24, 1910, for the Pittsburgh Pirates

MLB statistics
- Batting average: .222
- Home runs: 0
- Runs batted in: 41
- Stats at Baseball Reference

Teams
- Boston Beaneaters (1905); Boston Doves (1910); Pittsburgh Pirates (1910)

Bayard Heston "Bud" Sharpe (August 6, 1881 – May 31, 1916) was an American Major League Baseball first baseman/outfielder. He played Major League baseball in parts of two seasons – 1905 and 1910.

Sharpe was born on August 6, 1881, in West Chester, Pennsylvania. He batted left-handed and threw right-handed, and his height and weight are unknown. Sharpe chose to attend Penn State University.

On April 14, 1905, at the age of 23, Sharpe made his big league debut with the Boston Beaneaters. In 46 games that year, he batted .182 in 170 at-bats.

The next chance Sharpe got to play in the big leagues was with the Pittsburgh Pirates in 1910. He played only four games with them that year before being traded to the Boston Doves on April 28 with Sam Frock for Kirby White. With both teams in 1910, Sharpe hit a combined .237 in 119 games.

On the diamond, Sharpe committed 23 career errors for a .983 fielding percentage.

Sharpe played his final big league game on September 24, 1910. He died from a heart attack on May 31, 1916, in Haddock, Georgia, at the age of 34. His body was buried in Greenmount Cemetery in West Chester, Pennsylvania.

Sharpe was also a noted soccer player, spending time with a local team in West Chester during the baseball off-seasons.
