= Orson Baldwin =

American baseball player (1881–1942)

- Pitcher
- Born: November 3, 1881; Carson City, Michigan, U.S.
- Died: February 16, 1942 (aged 60); Los Angeles, California, U.S.
- Batted: Unknown Threw: Right

MLB debut
- September 6, 1908, for the St. Louis Cardinals

Last MLB appearance
- September 22, 1908, for the St. Louis Cardinals

MLB statistics
- Win–loss record: 1–3
- Earned run average: 6.14
- Strikeouts: 5
- Stats at Baseball Reference

Teams
- St. Louis Cardinals (1908)

Orson F. Baldwin (November 3, 1881 – February 16, 1942) was an American pitcher in Major League Baseball. He played for the St. Louis Cardinals in 1908.
