= Mike Konnick =

American baseball player (1889–1971)

Mike Kozicky
- Catcher / Shortstop
- Born: January 13, 1889; Glen Lyon, Pennsylvania, U.S.
- Died: July 9, 1971 (aged 82); Wilkes-Barre, Pennsylvania, U.S.
- Batted: Right Threw: Right

MLB debut
- October 3, 1909, for the Cincinnati Reds

Last MLB appearance
- May 24, 1910, for the Cincinnati Reds

MLB statistics
- Batting average: .250
- Home runs: 0
- Runs batted in: 1
- Stats at Baseball Reference

Teams
- Cincinnati Reds (1909–1910)

Michael Aloysius Kozicky (January 13, 1889 – July 9, 1971) was an American Major League Baseball player and scout and a minor league manager.

== Biography ==
Kozicky had a very brief major league career with the Cincinnati Reds. During the 1909 season, he was called up for two games and was used as a catcher. In the 1910 campaign, he saw action in a single game as a shortstop. In total, Kozicky had two hits in eight at bats for the major league club with a double, a run batted in and a walk.

Kozicky had a long minor league career with his best seasons coming at Reading. Playing first base for the Reading Coal Barons of the International League in 1919, he had a .335 batting average for the season. The newly renamed Reading Marines of 1920 were helped by Kozicky's stellar campaign. Now playing as a catcher, he hit .336 with 94 runs, 33 doubles, 11 triples, 22 home runs and a .575 slugging percentage.

Kozicky did some managing later in his minor league career including stints with the Virginia League Kinston Eagles and the New York–Penn League Binghamton Triplets.

Kozicky was a scout for the Philadelphia Phillies from 1961 to 1971.
