= Fred Gaiser =

German baseball player (1885–1918)

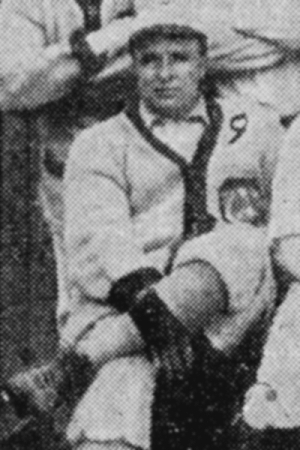
- Pitcher
- Born: August 31, 1885; Stuttgart, German Empire
- Died: October 9, 1918 (aged 33); Trenton, New Jersey, U.S.
- Batted: Unknown Threw: Right

MLB debut
- September 3, 1908, for the St. Louis Cardinals

Last MLB appearance
- September 3, 1908, for the St. Louis Cardinals

MLB statistics
- Win–loss record: 0-0
- Earned run average: 7.71
- Strikeouts: 2
- Stats at Baseball Reference

Teams
- St. Louis Cardinals (1908)

Frederick Jacob Gaiser (August 31, 1885 – October 9, 1918) was a pitcher in Major League Baseball. He played for the St. Louis Cardinals in 1908. He died at the age of 33 from Spanish flu.
