= Simon F. Pauxtis =

American baseball player and football coach (1885–1961)

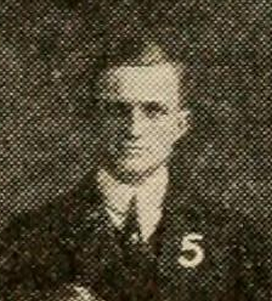
- Pauxtis at Dickinson c. 1911

Biographical details
- Born: July 20, 1885; Pittston, Pennsylvania, U.S.
- Died: March 13, 1961 (aged 75); Philadelphia, Pennsylvania, U.S.

Playing career

Football
- 1907: Penn
- Position: End

Coaching career (HC unless noted)

Football
- 1911–1912: Dickinson
- 1913–1915: Penn (ends)
- 1916–1929: Pennsylvania Military
- 1930–1938: Penn (ends)
- 1939–1946: Pennsylvania Military

Basketball
- 1918–1919: Pennsylvania Military

Head coaching record
- Overall: 90–80–10 (football); 4–7 (basketball)

Simon Francis Pauxtis (July 20, 1885 – March 13, 1961) was an American professional baseball player and college football coach. He played football and baseball at the University of Pennsylvania and appeared in four Major League Baseball games for the Cincinnati Reds. He then had a 36-year college football coaching career which included head coaching stints at Dickinson College and the Pennsylvania Military College (now Widener University).

== Playing career ==
Si Pauxtis
- Catcher
- Batted: Right Threw: Right

MLB debut
- September 18, 1909, for the Cincinnati Reds

Last MLB appearance
- October 5, 1909, for the Cincinnati Reds

MLB statistics
- Batting average: .125
- Home runs: 0
- RBI: 0
- Stats at Baseball Reference

Teams
- Cincinnati Reds (1909)

A native of Pittston, Pennsylvania, Pauxtis played football and baseball at Edwards High School, Wyoming Seminary, and Lebanon Valley College. He was a catcher for the Penn Quakers baseball team while studying law at the University of Pennsylvania. He was noted not only for his defensive play but also for his batting skills. Pauxtis also played end for Penn's football team. He was declared ineligible from all of Penn's athletic teams in 1908 after it was discovered he had played professional baseball under an assumed name. He graduated from the University of Pennsylvania Law School in 1910.

After losing his college eligibility, Pauxtis signed with the New York Highlanders. In June 1909, his contract was purchased by Altoona of the Tri-State League. Later that year, he was acquired by the Cincinnati Reds to help pick up the slack in the team left by injuries of team players Tom Clarke and Frank Roth. He played for the Reds for the 1909 season playing his first official game on September 18 and his last game on October 5. Pauxtis officially played for four games. At the end of the year, he was sent down to the Rock Island Islanders, but Pauxtis refused to report. In 1911, he played 80 games for the Syracuse Stars of the New York State League.

== Coaching career ==
Pauxtis was the 12th head football coach at Dickinson College in Carlisle, Pennsylvania and he held that position for two seasons, from 1911 until 1912. His coaching record at Dickinson was 8–6–2. While at Dickinson, he struck up a friendship with Pop Warner who was coaching at Carlisle Indian School at the time.

From 1913 to 1915, Pauxtis was an assistant to George H. Brooke at Penn.

Pauxtis coached football at the Pennsylvania Military College (PMC)—now known as Widener University—in Chester, Pennsylvania from 1916 to 1929. His 1925 team finished the year with a 9–1 record with victories over Temple and Rutgers.

In 1930, Pauxis returned to his alma mater as ends coach under Lud Wray. He was retained by Wray's successor, Harvey Harman. He was a candidate to succeed Harman in 1938, but freshman coach George Munger was chosen instead.

Pauxtis again coached at PMC from 1939 to 1946. His teams had a combined record of 82–74–8 during his two stints at the school.

== Outside of sports ==
Pauxtis practiced law in Philadelphia and Wilkes-Barre, Pennsylvania for 50 years. He was an Electoral College elector from Pennsylvania in the 1916 Presidential Election. In 1922, he was part of a group that purchased the New Lebanon Brewery.

Pauxtis died on March 13, 1961 at his home in Philadelphia.
