= Matt Hongoltz-Hetling =

American journalist

Matt Hongoltz-Hetling is a Pulitzer Prize finalist journalist who won the 2011 George Polk award for Local Reporting, and appears on the List of George Polk Award Winners. He is currently a reporter for the Valley News, a daily newspaper in Lebanon, New Hampshire.

== Journalism career ==
In 2010, as an assistant editor, he wrote an article titled "Tangled Web Between Casino, Ag. Association," which was published in the Advertiser Democrat, a small weekly newspaper located in Norway, Maine. The article documented the sale of a racetrack from the Oxford County Agricultural Society to casino investment firm Black Bear Entertainment, with both entities sharing executive members. For this story, the Maine Press Association awarded him first place in the category of "Investigative Reporting" by a weekly newspaper. It was also cited as an example of good investigative journalism by Down East, The Magazine of Maine, where Al Diamon called it "a careful examination of the ties that bind the gambling developers and the local agricultural society, connections that involve large sums of money, valuable real estate, political clout, and enough questionable statements to fill a gubernatorial debate."

Hongoltz-Hetling and Editor A. M. Sheehan also won first place in the category of "Continuing Story" in the same competition, for a seven-part series that weighed the pros and cons of a proposed casino in the town Oxford, Maine.

The casino coverage also received first place in the "Special Award" category of the New England Newspaper and Press Association.

In 2011, Hongoltz-Hetling and Editor A.M. Sheehan co-authored a story called "Slumlords, shoddy oversight, tax dollars ... living on Section 8." The article exposed poor living conditions in housing that was federally subsidized through the Section 8 program of the U.S. Department of Housing and Urban Development. The article, and several follow-up stories, prompted a speedy investigation by state officials, which eventually led to the firing of an inspector, the cancellation of third-party inspection contracts by the Maine State Housing Authority, and a revision of procedures designed to prevent such conditions from being allowed to exist in Section 8 rental properties, as reported by various media outlets, including the Kennebec Journal.

For their coverage of the housing conditions, Hongoltz-Hetling and Sheehan won the 2011 George Polk Award for Local Reporting, one of journalism's top honors, from Long Island University. When announcing the award, former New York Times editor John Darnton said that it was "extraordinarily reported and written and carried a major impact."

Hongoltz-Hetling was interviewed by Susan Sharon on the Maine Public Broadcasting Network for his part in the housing articles.

In 2012, Hongoltz-Hetling and Sheehan were announced as Pulitzer Prize finalists in the category of Local Reporting. Hongoltz-Hetling and Sheehan were nominated for what Pulitzer jurors called "their tenacious exposure of disgraceful conditions in federally supported housing in a small rural community that, within hours, triggered a state investigation."

In 2015, Hongoltz-Hetling traveled to Sierra Leone to report on the Ebola outbreak and its impact on maternal health for the Pulitzer Center on Crisis Reporting.

On 15 September 2020 his book A Libertarian Walks Into a Bear: The Utopian Plot to Liberate an American Town (And Some Bears) about the Free Town Project was published by Hachette Book Group.

He is a member of the Order of the Occult Hand.

== Family ==
He is the brother of John R. Hetling, a bioengineer who specializes in neural prosthesis of the neural retina.
