= Gene Moore (outfielder) =

American baseball player (1909–1978)

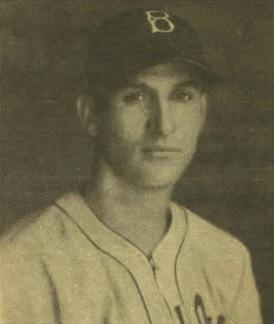
- Right fielder
- Born: August 26, 1909; Lancaster, Texas, U.S.
- Died: March 12, 1978 (aged 68); Jackson, Mississippi, U.S.
- Batted: Left Threw: Left

MLB debut
- September 19, 1931, for the Cincinnati Reds

Last MLB appearance
- September 30, 1945, for the St. Louis Browns

MLB statistics
- Batting average: .270
- Home runs: 58
- Runs batted in: 436
- Stats at Baseball Reference

Teams
- Cincinnati Reds (1931); St. Louis Cardinals (1933–1935); Boston Bees (1936–1938); Brooklyn Dodgers (1939–1940); Boston Bees/Braves (1940–1941); Washington Senators (1942–1943); St. Louis Browns (1944–1945)

Career highlights and awards
- All-Star (1937)

Eugene Moore Jr. (August 26, 1909 – March 12, 1978) was an American professional baseball right fielder. He played in Major League Baseball (MLB) for the Cincinnati Reds, St. Louis Cardinals, Boston Bees / Braves, Brooklyn Dodgers, Washington Senators, and St. Louis Browns between 1931 and 1945. His father, Gene Sr., was a pitcher for the Pirates and Reds between 1910 and 1912.

== Career ==
In a 14-season career, Moore posted a .270 batting average with 58 home runs and 436 RBI in 1042 games played.

== Best season ==
In 1936, Moore played in 151 games for the Boston Bees, batting .290, with 185 hits, 38 doubles, 12 triples, and 91 runs scored – all career-highs. On May 1, facing Pittsburgh's Waite Hoyt, Moore made Forbes Field history, becoming the first left-handed batter to launch a home run over that stadium's distant left-field wall, as well as the first to clear its then eleven-year-old, 24-foot-high scoreboard. (Note: As if that were not enough, just three innings earlier, Moore had achieved what may well have also been a Forbes Field first by powering what would end up an uncontested inside-the-park home run more than 430 feet to dead center, where it struck the Barney Dreyfuss Memorial on the fly and caromed back towards the infield, allowing Moore to score standing up without a throw.) (Scarcely one year later, he would become the first and only player to perform this feat twice.)

== See also ==
- List of second-generation Major League Baseball players
