= Jimmy Wacker =

American baseball player (1883–1948)

- Pitcher
- Born: December 8, 1883; Jeffersonville, Indiana, U.S.
- Died: August 7, 1948 (aged 64); Evansville, Indiana, U.S.
- Batted: Left Threw: Left

MLB debut
- April 28, 1909, for the Pittsburgh Pirates

Last MLB appearance
- April 28, 1909, for the Pittsburgh Pirates

MLB statistics
- Win–loss record: 0–0
- Earned run average: 0.00
- Strikeouts: 0
- Stats at Baseball Reference

Teams
- Pittsburgh Pirates (1909)

Charles James Wacker (December 8, 1883 – August 7, 1948) was an American professional baseball pitcher for the Pittsburgh Pirates in 1909. He was born in Jeffersonville, Indiana and died in Evansville, Indiana. He is buried in the Oak Hill Cemetery in Evansville, Indiana.
