= Art Fromme =

American baseball player (1883–1956)

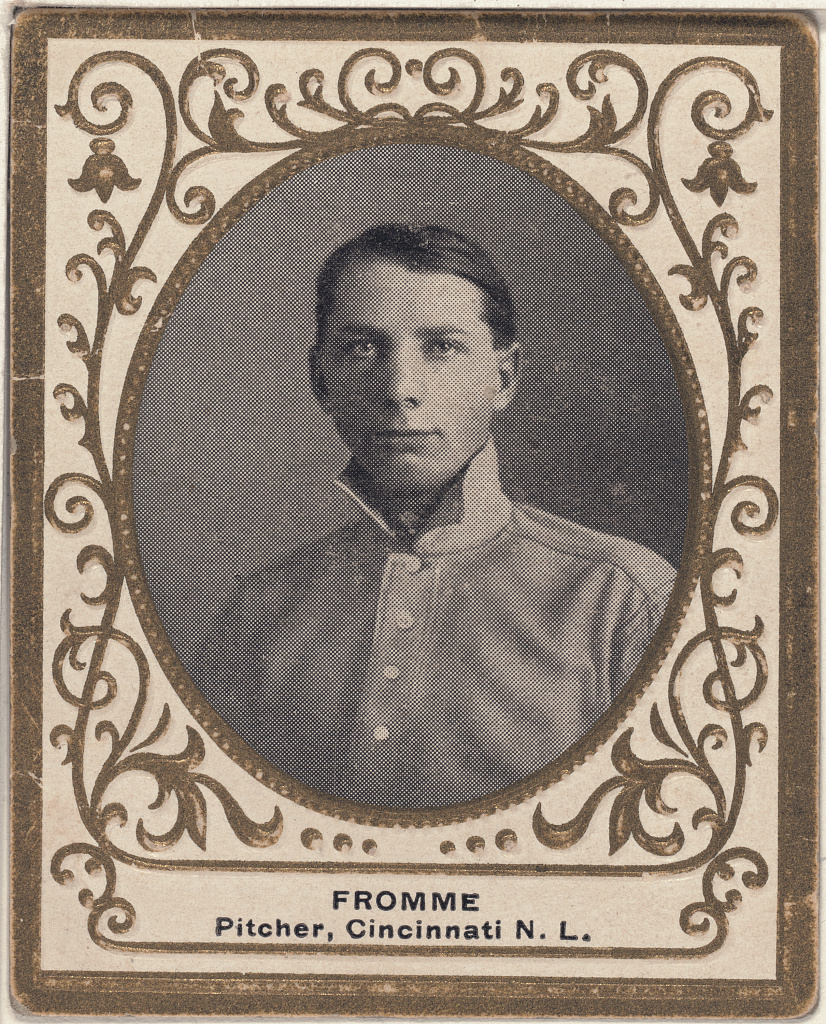
- Pitcher
- Born: September 3, 1883; Quincy, Illinois, U.S.
- Died: August 24, 1956 (aged 72); Los Angeles, California, U.S.
- Batted: Right Threw: Right

MLB debut
- September 14, 1906, for the St. Louis Cardinals

Last MLB appearance
- May 7, 1913, for the New York Giants

MLB statistics
- Win–loss record: 80–90
- Earned run average: 2.90
- Strikeouts: 638
- Stats at Baseball Reference

Teams
- St. Louis Cardinals (1906–1908); Cincinnati Reds (1909–1913); New York Giants (1913–1915)

Arthur Henry Fromme (September 3, 1883 – August 24, 1956) was an American professional baseball player who pitched in the Major Leagues from 1906-1915. He played for the St. Louis Cardinals, Cincinnati Reds and New York Giants.
