= Clare Patterson =

American baseball player (1887–1913)

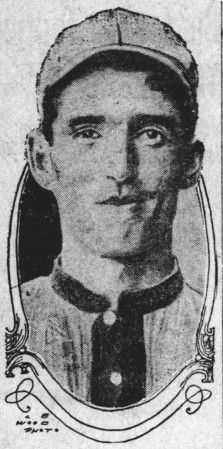
- Outfielder
- Born: October 5, 1887; Arkansas City, Kansas, U.S.
- Died: March 28, 1913 (aged 25); Mohave, California, U.S.
- Batted: Left Threw: Right

MLB debut
- September 5, 1909, for the Cincinnati Reds

Last MLB appearance
- October 5, 1909, for the Cincinnati Reds

MLB statistics
- Games played: 4
- At bats: 8
- Hits: 1
- Stats at Baseball Reference

Teams
- Cincinnati Reds (1909)

Lorenzo Clare Patterson (October 5, 1887 – March 28, 1913) was an American outfielder in Major League Baseball. He played for the Cincinnati Reds in 1909.
