= Gus Hetling =

American baseball player (1885–1962)

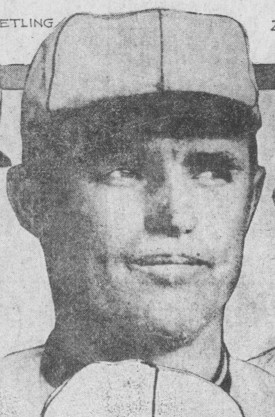
- Third baseman
- Born: November 21, 1885; St. Louis, Missouri, U.S.
- Died: October 13, 1962 (aged 76); Wichita, Kansas, U.S.
- Batted: Right Threw: Right

MLB debut
- October 6, 1906, for the Detroit Tigers

Last MLB appearance
- October 6, 1906, for the Detroit Tigers

MLB statistics
- Batting average: .143
- Home runs: 0
- Runs batted in: 0
- Stats at Baseball Reference

Teams
- Detroit Tigers (1906)

August Julius Hetling (November 21, 1885 – October 13, 1962) was an American professional baseball player from 1904 to 1917. He appeared in two games for the Detroit Tigers in October 1906 and played 14 years of Minor League Baseball, including three seasons in Springfield, Missouri (1904–06), four years in Wichita, Kansas (1907–1908, 1915–1916), and four years with the Oakland Oaks in the Pacific Coast League (1911–14). After compiling more than 200 hits and a .297 batting average in 1912, he was selected as the Most Valuable Player in the Pacific Coast League.

== Early years ==
Hetling was born in November 1885 at St. Louis, Missouri. His father, Henry Hetling, was born in Missouri in 1856, and his mother, Bertha Hetling, was also a Missouri native born in 1865. At the time of the 1900 U.S. Census, the family lived in St. Louis, and Hetling's father was employed as a day laborer.

== Baseball player ==
=== Major leagues ===
Hetling played only one day in Major League Baseball, appearing as a third baseman in both games of a double-header for the Detroit Tigers on October 6, 1906. Hetling had one hit in seven at bats for a .143 batting average. He handled five total chances with three putouts, two assists, and no errors.

=== Minor leagues ===
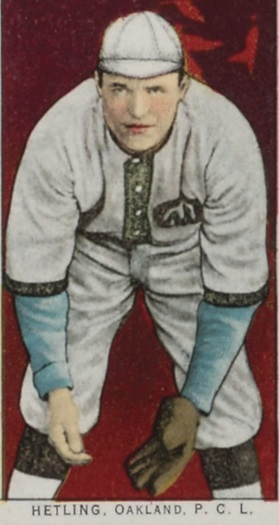
A baseball card featuring Hetling

Hetling spent most of his baseball career, totaling 14 years, in the minor leagues. He played for the Springfield Midgets (1904, 1906), Springfield Highlanders (1906), Wichita Jobbers (1907–08), Kansas City Blues (1909), and Spokane Indians (1910). In 1906, he had 30 doubles, 12 triples and three home runs in 140 games for Wichita. In 1908, he hit .318 in 140 games for Wichita. His .318 batting average was second best in the Western Association in 1908, and he led the league with 116 hits. Early in the 1909 season, while Hetling was playing for Kansas City in the American Association, Sporting Life wrote:

"Gus Hetling is the real article at third. Here is the star of the flock of Blue 1909 recruits. Hetling is a finished product. He handles himself with natural ease born of ability and confidence. He wings the pill to first with unerring accuracy, although he has a peculiar motion in throwing. In the exhibition games he has been hitting as if he intends to show the A. A. pitchers a sample of the .318 batting pace he stepped in the Western Association."

He spent several years of his career in the Pacific Coast League playing for the Portland Beavers in 1910, the Oakland Oaks from 1911 to 1914, and the Vernon Tigers in 1915. He appeared in a career high 202 games with 708 at bats and a .297 batting average for the Oaks in 1912. He helped lead the Oaks to the 1912 Pacific Coast League pennant and was selected as the Most Valuable Player in the league by a vote of the league's six official scorers. He was given an automobile for winning the MVP award.

Hetling concluded his career with the Wichita Witches (1915–16) and San Antonio Bronchos (1917).

== Family and later years ==
In September 1918, and at the time of the 1920 and 1930 U.S. Censuses, Hetling was living in Wichita, Kansas, with his wife Rose E. (Young) Hetling. He was employed in 1918 as a salesman, in 1920 as a travelling salesman, and in 1930 in the cigar business.

Hetling died in October 1962 at Wichita, Kansas.
