= Gene Moore (pitcher) =

American baseball player (1886–1938)

- Pitcher
- Born: November 10, 1886; Lancaster, Texas, U.S.
- Died: August 30, 1938 (aged 51); Dallas, Texas, U.S.
- Batted: Left Threw: Left

MLB debut
- September 28, 1909, for the Pittsburgh Pirates

Last MLB appearance
- September 2, 1912, for the Cincinnati Reds

MLB statistics
- Win–loss record: 2-2
- Earned run average: 4.76
- Strikeouts: 17
- Stats at Baseball Reference

Teams
- Pittsburgh Pirates (1909–1910); Cincinnati Reds (1912)

Eugene Moore Sr. (November 10, 1886 – August 31, 1938), nicknamed "Blue Goose", was an American left-handed pitcher in Major League Baseball who played for the Pittsburgh Pirates (1909–1910) and Cincinnati Reds (1912). Moore was born in Lancaster, Texas. His son, Gene Jr, was an All-Star outfielder who played for seven major league teams from 1931 through 1945.

In a three-season career, Moore posted a 2–2 record with 17 strikeouts and a 4.76 ERA in 34.0 innings pitched.

Moore died in Dallas, Texas, at the age of 51.
