= Chappy Charles =

American baseball player (1881–1959)

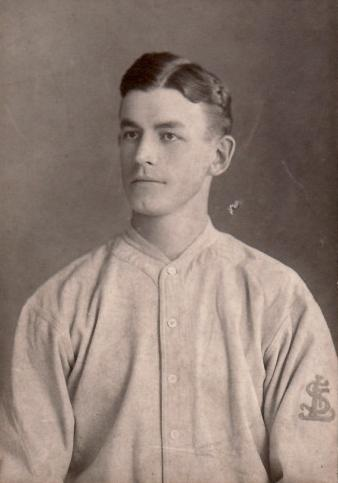
- Infielder
- Born: March 25, 1881; Phillipsburg, New Jersey, U.S.
- Died: August 4, 1959 (aged 78); Bethlehem, Pennsylvania, U.S.
- Batted: Right Threw: Right

MLB debut
- April 15, 1908, for the St. Louis Cardinals

Last MLB appearance
- May 28, 1910, for the Cincinnati Reds

MLB statistics
- Batting average: .219
- Home runs: 1
- Runs batted in: 51
- Stats at Baseball Reference

Teams
- St. Louis Cardinals (1908–1909); Cincinnati Reds (1909–1910)

Raymond "Chappy" Charles (March 25, 1881 – August 4, 1959) was an American infielder in Major League Baseball. He played for the St. Louis Cardinals and Cincinnati Reds.
