= Blaine Durbin =

American baseball player (1886–1943)

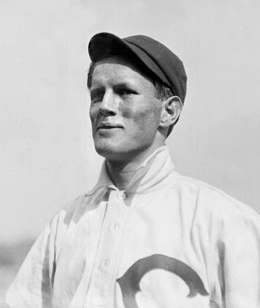
- Outfielder
- Born: September 10, 1886; Lamar, Missouri, U.S.
- Died: September 11, 1943 (aged 57); Kirkwood, Missouri, U.S.
- Batted: Left Threw: Left

MLB debut
- April 24, 1907, for the Chicago Cubs

Last MLB appearance
- June 30, 1909, for the Pittsburgh Pirates

MLB statistics
- Games played: 32
- Batting average: .275
- Runs batted in: 0
- Stats at Baseball Reference

Teams
- Chicago Cubs (1907–1908); Cincinnati Reds (1909); Pittsburgh Pirates (1909)

Blaine Alphonsus Durbin (September 10, 1886 – September 11, 1943), nicknamed "Danny Dreamer," was an American Major League Baseball outfielder. He was born in Lamar, Missouri.

== Major League career ==
Durbin made his Major League debut on April 24, 1907, for the Chicago Cubs. That season, he appeared in five games as a pitcher, going 0–1 with a save. He also played the outfield in five games that season. Durbin played for the Cubs during their 1907 and 1908 pennant-winning seasons but did not play in either World Series. Before being traded to the Cincinnati Reds on January 18, 1909 (together with Tom Downey for outfielder John Kane), Durbin had a batting average of .250 in 14 games, and on May 28, after appearing in only six games for Cincinnati, he was shipped to the Pittsburgh Pirates, doing little more than ride the bench before being released scarcely one month later. Durbin appeared only once (and for the final time in a Major League uniform), as a pinch-runner representing the potential tying run in the ninth inning of a 3–2 loss to Chicago, on June 30, 1909, in the first game ever played at Forbes Field.

== Later life ==
After playing a few years in Minor League Baseball, Durbin retired as a baseball player. Just one day after his 57th birthday on September 11, 1943, Durbin died in Kirkwood, Missouri. His burial is located at Saint Peters Cemetery in Kirkwood at St. Louis County in Missouri. Durbin was memorialized as the protagonist in the fictional novel The Best Team Ever (2008) by Alan Alop and Doc Noel (ISBN 978-1935098027).
