= 1909 Major League Baseball season =

1909 MLB season
- League: American League (AL); National League (NL)
- Sport: Baseball
- Duration: Regular season: April 12 – October 3, 1909 (AL); April 12 – October 7, 1909 (NL); World Series: October 8–16, 1909
- Games: 154
- Teams: 16 (8 per league)

Pennant winners
- NL champions: Pittsburgh Pirates
- NL runners-up: Chicago Cubs
- AL champions: Detroit Tigers
- AL runners-up: Philadelphia Athletics

World Series
- Champions: Pittsburgh Pirates
- Runners-up: Detroit Tigers

MLB seasons
- ← 1908 1910 →

Locations of teams for the 1909 American League season
American League
Locations of teams for the 1909–1910 National League seasons
National League

The 1909 major league baseball season began on April 12, 1909. The regular season ended on October 7, with the Pittsburgh Pirates and Detroit Tigers as regular season champions of the National League and American League, respectively. The postseason began with Game 1 of the sixth modern World Series on October 8 and ended with Game 7 on October 16. The Pirates defeated the Tigers, four games to three, capturing their first championship in franchise history. Going into the season, the defending World Series champions were the Chicago Cubs from the 1908 season.

In the National League, the Chicago Cubs had a record of 104–49 but finished 6 1/2 games behind the Pirates, setting a record for the most wins in an MLB regular season without reaching the postseason, which has only been equaled once, by the 1942 Brooklyn Dodgers, who had a record of 104–50.

== Schedule ==
The 1909 schedule consisted of 154 games for all teams in the American League and National League, each of which had eight teams. Each team was scheduled to play 22 games against the other seven teams of their respective league. This continued the format put in place for the 1904 season. This format would last until 1919.

Opening Day took place on April 14 with all but the Pittsburgh Pirates and St. Louis Cardinals playing. The American League would see its final day of the regular season on October 3, while the National League would see its final day of the regular season was on October 7. The World Series took place between October 8 and October 16.

== Rule changes ==
The 1909 season saw the following rule changes:

- A pitcher must face a minimum of one batter, due to a time-wasting trick to enable a team's intended pitcher to warmup for longer. This had previously occurred when one pitcher initially threw warmup pitches on the mound, before being taken out of the game (before facing a batter) to make way for a relief pitcher who now had extra warmup time.
- The American League implemented the following rules:
  - 40 minutes before each game for practice was allotted, with the first 30 minutes dedicated to the visiting team, while the last 10 minutes were for the home team.
  - Base runners were no longer allowed to advance more than two bases when a ball was thrown into the stands. Previously, there was no limit to how far a runner could go.
  - No passes to games were to be issued to members of the visiting team.
  - All teams must now maintain a large bulletin board giving the batting order accurately and indicating all changes as they are made.

== Teams ==
An asterisk (*) denotes the departure from a ballpark mid-season.

League	Team	City	Ballpark	Capacity	Manager
American League	Boston Red Sox	Boston, Massachusetts	Huntington Avenue Grounds	11,500	Fred Lake
American League	Chicago White Sox	Chicago, Illinois	South Side Park	15,000	Billy Sullivan
American League	Cleveland Naps	Cleveland, Ohio	League Park (Cleveland)	9,000	Nap Lajoie
American League	Cleveland Naps	Cleveland, Ohio	League Park (Cleveland)	9,000	Deacon McGuire
American League	Detroit Tigers	Detroit, Michigan	Bennett Park	8,500	Hughie Jennings
American League	New York Highlanders	New York, New York	Hilltop Park	16,000	George Stallings
American League	Philadelphia Athletics	Philadelphia, Pennsylvania	Shibe Park	23,000	Connie Mack
American League	St. Louis Browns	St. Louis, Missouri	Sportsman's Park	18,000	Jimmy McAleer
American League	Washington Senators	Washington, D.C.	National Park	9,000	Joe Cantillon
National League	Boston Doves	Boston, Massachusetts	South End Grounds	9,800	Harry Smith
National League	Boston Doves	Boston, Massachusetts	South End Grounds	9,800	Frank Bowerman
National League	Brooklyn Superbas	New York, New York	Washington Park	14,000	Harry Lumley
National League	Chicago Cubs	Chicago, Illinois	West Side Park	16,000	Frank Chance
National League	Cincinnati Reds	Cincinnati, Ohio	Palace of the Fans	12,000	Clark Griffith
National League	New York Giants	New York, New York	Polo Grounds	16,000	John McGraw
National League	Philadelphia Phillies	Philadelphia, Pennsylvania	National League Park	18,000	Billy Murray
National League	Pittsburgh Pirates	Pittsburgh, Pennsylvania	Exposition Park*	16,000*	Fred Clarke
National League	Pittsburgh Pirates	Pittsburgh, Pennsylvania	Forbes Field	23,000	Fred Clarke
National League	St. Louis Cardinals	St. Louis, Missouri	League Park (St. Louis)	21,000	Roger Bresnahan

== Standings ==
=== American League ===
American League
Team	W	L	Pct.	GB	Home	Road
Detroit Tigers	98	54	.645	—	57‍–‍19	41‍–‍35
Philadelphia Athletics	95	58	.621	3½	49‍–‍27	46‍–‍31
Boston Red Sox	88	63	.583	9½	47‍–‍28	41‍–‍35
Chicago White Sox	78	74	.513	20	42‍–‍34	36‍–‍40
New York Highlanders	74	77	.490	23½	41‍–‍35	33‍–‍42
Cleveland Naps	71	82	.464	27½	39‍–‍37	32‍–‍45
St. Louis Browns	61	89	.407	36	40‍–‍37	21‍–‍52
Washington Senators	42	110	.276	56	27‍–‍48	15‍–‍62

=== National League ===
National League
Team	W	L	Pct.	GB	Home	Road
Pittsburgh Pirates	110	42	.724	—	56‍–‍21	54‍–‍21
Chicago Cubs	104	49	.680	6½	47‍–‍29	57‍–‍20
New York Giants	92	61	.601	18½	44‍–‍33	48‍–‍28
Cincinnati Reds	77	76	.503	33½	39‍–‍38	38‍–‍38
Philadelphia Phillies	74	79	.484	36½	40‍–‍37	34‍–‍42
Brooklyn Superbas	55	98	.359	55½	34‍–‍45	21‍–‍53
St. Louis Cardinals	54	98	.355	56	26‍–‍48	28‍–‍50
Boston Doves	45	108	.294	65½	27‍–‍47	18‍–‍61

=== Tie games ===
23 tie games (13 in AL, 10 in NL), which are not factored into winning percentage or games behind (and were often replayed again), occurred throughout the season.

==== American League ====
- Boston Red Sox, 1
- Chicago White Sox, 7
- Cleveland Naps, 2
- Detroit Tigers, 6
- New York Highlanders, 2
- St. Louis Browns, 4
- Washington Senators, 4

==== National League ====
- Boston Doves, 2
- Brooklyn Superbas, 2
- Chicago Cubs, 2
- Cincinnati Reds, 4
- New York Giants, 5
- Philadelphia Phillies, 1
- Pittsburgh Pirates, 2
- St. Louis Cardinals, 2

== Postseason ==
The postseason began on October 8 and ended on October 16 with the Pittsburgh Pirates defeating the Detroit Tigers in the 1909 World Series in seven games.

=== Bracket ===
World Series
AL	Detroit Tigers	3
NL	Pittsburgh Pirates	4

== Managerial changes ==
=== Off-season ===
Team	Former Manager	New Manager
Boston Doves	Joe Kelley	Harry Smith
Brooklyn Superbas	Patsy Donovan	Harry Lumley
Chicago White Sox	Fielder Jones	Billy Sullivan
Cincinnati Reds	John Ganzel	Clark Griffith
New York Highlanders	Kid Elberfeld	George Stallings
St. Louis Cardinals	John McCloskey	Roger Bresnahan

=== In-season ===
Team	Former Manager	New Manager
Boston Doves	Harry Smith	Frank Bowerman
Cleveland Naps	Nap Lajoie	Deacon McGuire

== League leaders ==
=== American League ===
Hitting leaders
Stat	Player	Total
AVG	Ty Cobb^{1} (DET)	.377
OPS	Ty Cobb (DET)	.947
HR	Ty Cobb^{1} (DET)	9
RBI	Ty Cobb^{1} (DET)	107
R	Donie Bush (DET); Ty Cobb (DET)	115
H	Ty Cobb (DET)	216
SB	Ty Cobb (DET)	76

^{1} American League Triple Crown batting winner

Pitching leaders
Stat	Player	Total
W	George Mullin (DET)	29
L	Bob Groom (WSH)	26
ERA	Harry Krause (PHA)	1.39
K	Frank Smith (CWS)	177
IP	Frank Smith (CWS)	365.0
SV	Frank Arellanes (BOS)	6
WHIP	Ed Walsh (CWS)	0.938

=== National League ===
Hitting leaders
Stat	Player	Total
AVG	Honus Wagner (PIT)	.339
OPS	Honus Wagner (PIT)	.909
HR	Red Murray (NYG)	7
RBI	Honus Wagner (PIT)	100
R	Tommy Leach (PIT)	126
H	Larry Doyle (NYG)	172
SB	Bob Bescher (CIN)	54

Pitching leaders
Stat	Player	Total
W	Mordecai Brown (CHC)	27
L	Cecil Ferguson (BSN)	23
ERA	Christy Mathewson (NYG)	1.14
K	Orval Overall (CHC)	205
IP	Mordecai Brown (CHC)	342.2
SV	Mordecai Brown (CHC)	7
WHIP	Christy Mathewson (NYG)	0.828

== Milestones ==
=== Miscellaneous ===
- Boston Doves:
  - Set the modern National League record for most losses in a season on October 6 with 108.
  - Set the modern National League record for worst winning percentage with .294.

== Home field attendance ==
Team name	Wins	%±	Home attendance	%±	Per game
New York Giants	92	-6.1%	783,700	-13.9%	10,178
Philadelphia Athletics	95	39.7%	674,915	48.3%	8,880
Boston Red Sox	88	17.3%	668,965	41.4%	8,920
Chicago Cubs	104	5.1%	633,480	-4.8%	8,227
Pittsburgh Pirates	110	12.2%	534,950	39.9%	6,772
New York Highlanders	74	45.1%	501,000	64.0%	6,506
Detroit Tigers	98	8.9%	490,490	12.4%	6,288
Chicago White Sox	78	-11.4%	478,400	-24.8%	5,906
Cincinnati Reds	77	5.5%	424,643	6.4%	5,308
St. Louis Browns	61	-26.5%	366,274	-40.8%	4,636
Cleveland Naps	71	-21.1%	354,627	-16.0%	4,606
Brooklyn Superbas	55	3.8%	321,300	16.6%	4,067
Philadelphia Phillies	74	-10.8%	303,177	-27.9%	3,937
St. Louis Cardinals	54	10.2%	299,982	46.2%	3,947
Washington Senators	42	-37.3%	205,199	-22.3%	2,665
Boston Doves	45	-28.6%	195,188	-23.1%	2,568

== Venues ==
The 1909 season saw two teams move to three new venues.

- The Philadelphia Athletics leave Columbia Park (where they played eight seasons), and opened Shibe Park, where they would go on to play for 46 seasons through 1954 before relocating to Kansas City, Kansas as the Kansas City Athletics.
- The Pittsburgh Pirates would play their last game at the Exposition Park site on June 29, having played 21 seasons there going back to 1882 (with a gap between 1884 and 1890), and opened Forbes Field on June 30, where they would go on to play for 62 seasons through the middle of 1970.

== See also ==
- 1909 in baseball (Events, Births, Deaths)
