= 1910 Brooklyn Superbas season =

1910 Brooklyn Superbas
- League: National League
- Ballpark: Washington Park
- City: Brooklyn, New York
- Record: 64–90 (.416)
- League place: 6th
- Owners: Charles Ebbets, Henry Medicus
- President: Charles Ebbets
- Managers: Bill Dahlen

The 1910 Brooklyn Superbas hired Bill Dahlen as the new manager, but still finished in a dismal sixth place in the National League.

== Regular season ==
=== Season standings ===
National League
Team	W	L	Pct.	GB	Home	Road
Chicago Cubs	104	50	.675	—	58‍–‍19	46‍–‍31
New York Giants	91	63	.591	13	52‍–‍26	39‍–‍37
Pittsburgh Pirates	86	67	.562	17½	46‍–‍30	40‍–‍37
Philadelphia Phillies	78	75	.510	25½	40‍–‍36	38‍–‍39
Cincinnati Reds	75	79	.487	29	39‍–‍37	36‍–‍42
Brooklyn Superbas	64	90	.416	40	39‍–‍39	25‍–‍51
St. Louis Cardinals	63	90	.412	40½	35‍–‍41	28‍–‍49
Boston Doves	53	100	.346	50½	29‍–‍48	24‍–‍52

=== Record vs. opponents ===
1910 National League record Sources:
Team	BSN	BRO	CHC	CIN	NYG	PHI	PIT	STL
Boston	—	10–12	5–17	8–14–1	6–16–1	4–17–2	8–14	12–10
Brooklyn	12–10	—	6–16	7–15	8–14	9–13–1	10–12–1	12–10
Chicago	17–5	16–6	—	16–6	14–8	14–8	12–10	15–7
Cincinnati	14–8–1	15–7	6–16	—	8–14	10–12–1	10–12	12–10
New York	16–6–1	14–8	8–14	14–8	—	15–7	12–10	12–10
Philadelphia	17–4–2	13–9–1	8–14	12–10–1	7–15	—	11–11	10–12
Pittsburgh	14–8	12–10–1	10–12	12–10	10–12	11–11	—	17–4
St. Louis	10–12	10–12	7–15	10–12	10–12	12–10	4–17	—

=== Notable transactions ===
- April 13, 1910: Harry McIntire was traded by the Superbas to the Chicago Cubs for Bill Davidson, Tony Smith and Happy Smith.

=== Roster ===
1910 Brooklyn Superbas
Roster
Pitchers: Cy Barger; George Bell; Sandy Burk; George Crable; Rube Dessau; Elmer Knetzer; Fred Miller; Nap Rucker; Doc Scanlan; Frank Schneiberg; Kaiser Wilhelm	Catchers: Bill Bergen; Tex Erwin; Otto Miller; Infielders: Jake Daubert; John Hummel; Ed Lennox; Pryor McElveen; Tommy McMillan; Tony Smith; Dolly Stark	Outfielders: Al Burch; Bob Coulson; Jack Dalton; Bill Davidson; George Hunter; Harry Lumley; Happy Smith; Zack Wheat; Other batters: Bill Dahlen; Tim Jordan	Manager: Bill Dahlen

== Player stats ==
=== Batting ===
==== Starters by position ====
Note: Pos = Position; G = Games played; AB = At bats; H = Hits; Avg. = Batting average; HR = Home runs; RBI = Runs batted in

Pos	Player	G	AB	H	Avg.	HR	RBI
C	Bill Bergen	89	249	40	.161	0	14
1B	Jake Daubert	144	552	146	.264	8	50
2B	John Hummel	153	578	141	.244	5	74
3B	Ed Lennox	110	367	95	.259	3	32
SS	Tony Smith	106	321	58	.181	1	16
OF	Zack Wheat	156	606	172	.284	2	55
OF	Jack Dalton	77	273	62	.227	1	21
OF	Bill Davidson	136	509	121	.238	0	34

==== Other batters ====
Note: G = Games played; AB = At bats; H = Hits; Avg. = Batting average; HR = Home runs; RBI = Runs batted in

Player	G	AB	H	Avg.	HR	RBI
Al Burch	103	352	83	.236	1	20
Pryor McElveen	74	213	48	.225	1	26
Tex Erwin	81	202	38	.188	1	10
Dolly Stark	30	103	17	.165	0	8
Bob Coulson	25	89	22	.247	1	13
Happy Smith	35	76	18	.237	0	5
Tommy McMillan	23	74	13	.176	0	2
Otto Miller	31	66	11	.167	0	2
Harry Lumley	8	21	3	.143	0	0
Tim Jordan	5	5	1	.200	1	3
Bill Dahlen	3	2	0	.000	0	0
George Hunter	1	0	0	----	0	0

=== Pitching ===
==== Starting pitchers ====
Note: G = Games pitched; IP = Innings pitched; W = Wins; L = Losses; ERA = Earned run average; SO = Strikeouts

Player	G	IP	W	L	ERA	SO
Nap Rucker	41	320.1	17	18	2.58	147
George Bell	44	310.0	10	27	2.64	102
Cy Barger	35	271.2	15	15	2.88	87
Doc Scanlan	34	217.1	9	11	2.61	103
Elmer Knetzer	20	132.2	7	5	3.19	56
Sandy Burk	4	19.1	0	3	6.05	14

==== Other pitchers ====
Note: G = Games pitched; IP = Innings pitched; W = Wins; L = Losses; ERA = Earned run average; SO = Strikeouts

Player	G	IP	W	L	ERA	SO
Kaiser Wilhelm	15	68.1	3	7	4.74	17
Fred Miller	6	21.0	1	1	4.71	2
George Crable	2	7.1	0	0	4.91	3

==== Relief pitchers ====
Note: G = Games pitched; W = Wins; L = Losses; SV = Saves; ERA = Earned run average; SO = Strikeouts

Player	G	W	L	SV	ERA	SO
Rube Dessau	19	2	3	1	5.79	24
Frank Schneiberg	1	0	0	0	63.00	0
