= 1910 Boston Doves season =

1910 Boston Doves
- League: National League
- Ballpark: South End Grounds
- City: Boston, Massachusetts
- Record: 53–100 (.346)
- League place: 8th
- Owners: John Dovey
- Managers: Fred Lake

The 1910 Boston Doves season was the 40th season of the franchise. The Doves finished eighth in the National League with a record of 53 wins and 100 losses.

== Regular season ==
=== Season standings ===
National League
Team	W	L	Pct.	GB	Home	Road
Chicago Cubs	104	50	.675	—	58‍–‍19	46‍–‍31
New York Giants	91	63	.591	13	52‍–‍26	39‍–‍37
Pittsburgh Pirates	86	67	.562	17½	46‍–‍30	40‍–‍37
Philadelphia Phillies	78	75	.510	25½	40‍–‍36	38‍–‍39
Cincinnati Reds	75	79	.487	29	39‍–‍37	36‍–‍42
Brooklyn Superbas	64	90	.416	40	39‍–‍39	25‍–‍51
St. Louis Cardinals	63	90	.412	40½	35‍–‍41	28‍–‍49
Boston Doves	53	100	.346	50½	29‍–‍48	24‍–‍52

=== Record vs. opponents ===
1910 National League record Sources:
Team	BSN	BRO	CHC	CIN	NYG	PHI	PIT	STL
Boston	—	10–12	5–17	8–14–1	6–16–1	4–17–2	8–14	12–10
Brooklyn	12–10	—	6–16	7–15	8–14	9–13–1	10–12–1	12–10
Chicago	17–5	16–6	—	16–6	14–8	14–8	12–10	15–7
Cincinnati	14–8–1	15–7	6–16	—	8–14	10–12–1	10–12	12–10
New York	16–6–1	14–8	8–14	14–8	—	15–7	12–10	12–10
Philadelphia	17–4–2	13–9–1	8–14	12–10–1	7–15	—	11–11	10–12
Pittsburgh	14–8	12–10–1	10–12	12–10	10–12	11–11	—	17–4
St. Louis	10–12	10–12	7–15	10–12	10–12	12–10	4–17	—

=== Notable transactions ===
- May 13, 1910: Lew Richie was traded by the Doves to the Chicago Cubs for Doc Miller.

=== Roster ===
1910 Boston Doves
Roster
Pitchers: Buster Brown; Billy Burke; Cliff Curtis; Chick Evans; George Ferguson; Sam Frock; Ralph Good; Al Mattern; Jiggs Parson; Lew Richie; Lefty Tyler; Kirby White	Catchers: Rowdy Elliott; Peaches Graham; Bill Rariden; Harry Smith; Infielders: Ed Abbaticchio; Joe Burg; Gus Getz; Buck Herzog; Doc Martel; Bud Sharpe; Dave Shean; Bill Sweeney	Outfielders: Fred Beck; Bill Collins; Bill Cooney; Wilbur Good; Doc Miller; Herbie Moran; Jim Riley; Rube Sellers; Other batters: Art Kruger; Fred Lake; Fred Liese	Manager: Fred Lake

== Player stats ==
=== Batting ===
==== Starters by position ====
Note: Pos = Position; G = Games played; AB = At bats; H = Hits; Avg. = Batting average; HR = Home runs; RBI = Runs batted in

Pos	Player	G	AB	H	Avg.	HR	RBI
C	Peaches Graham	110	291	82	.282	0	21
1B	Bud Sharpe	115	439	105	.239	0	29
2B	Dave Shean	150	543	130	.239	3	36
SS	Bill Sweeney	150	499	133	.267	5	46
3B	Buck Herzog	106	380	95	.250	3	32
OF	Fred Beck	154	571	157	.275	10	64
OF	Bill Collins	151	584	141	.241	3	40
OF	Doc Miller	130	482	138	.286	3	55

==== Other batters ====
Note: G = Games played; AB = At bats; H = Hits; Avg. = Batting average; HR = Home runs; RBI = Runs batted in

Player	G	AB	H	Avg.	HR	RBI
Ed Abbaticchio	52	178	44	.247	0	10
Harry Smith	70	147	35	.238	1	15
Gus Getz	54	144	28	.194	0	7
Bill Rariden	49	137	31	.226	1	14
Wilbur Good	23	86	29	.337	0	11
Herbie Moran	20	67	8	.119	0	3
Joe Burg	13	46	15	.326	0	10
Rube Sellers	12	32	5	.156	0	2
Doc Martell	10	31	4	.129	0	1
Bill Cooney	8	12	3	.250	0	1
Fred Liese	5	4	0	.000	0	0
Rowdy Elliott	3	2	0	.000	0	0
Fred Lake	3	1	0	.000	0	0
Jim Riley	1	1	0	.000	0	0
Art Kruger	1	1	0	.000	0	0

=== Pitching ===
==== Starting pitchers ====
Note: G = Games pitched; IP = Innings pitched; W = Wins; L = Losses; ERA = Earned run average; SO = Strikeouts

Player	G	IP	W	L	ERA	SO
Al Mattern	51	305.0	16	19	2.98	94
Cliff Curtis	43	251.0	6	24	3.55	75
Kirby White	3	26.0	1	2	1.38	6

==== Other pitchers ====
Note: G = Games pitched; IP = Innings pitched; W = Wins; L = Losses; ERA = Earned run average; SO = Strikeouts

Player	G	IP	W	L	ERA	SO
Buster Brown	46	263.0	9	23	2.67	88
Sam Frock	45	255.1	12	19	3.21	79
Cecil Ferguson	26	123.0	7	7	3.80	40
Jiggs Parson	10	35.1	0	2	3.82	7
Lew Richie	4	16.1	0	3	2.76	7

==== Relief pitchers ====
Note: G = Games pitched; W = Wins; L = Losses; SV = Saves; ERA = Earned run average; SO = Strikeouts

Player	G	W	L	SV	ERA	SO
Billy Burke	19	1	0	0	4.08	22
Chick Evans	13	1	1	2	5.23	12
Lefty Tyler	2	0	0	0	2.38	6
Ralph Good	2	0	0	0	2.00	4
