= 1910 Philadelphia Phillies season =

Major League Baseball season

1910 Philadelphia Phillies
- League: National League
- Ballpark: National League Park
- City: Philadelphia, Pennsylvania
- Owners: Horace Fogel
- Managers: Red Dooin

The following lists the events of the 1910 Philadelphia Phillies season.

== Spring training ==
The Phillies trained in March 1910 at the Southern Pines Country Club in Southern Pines, North Carolina.

Phillies owner Horace Fogel considered the purchase of ten acres in Southern Pines in March 1910 to build a permanent spring training home for the Phillies to include a playing field and building to accommodate the full team and traveling party.

The Phillies unconditionally released Kid Gleason on April 12, 1910, prior to Opening Day. At the time, the Philadelphia Inquirer called Gleason "one of the most popular players who ever donned a Philadelphia uniform." Gleason would continue with the Phillies as a coach.

== Regular season ==
=== Season standings ===
National League
Team	W	L	Pct.	GB	Home	Road
Chicago Cubs	104	50	.675	—	58‍–‍19	46‍–‍31
New York Giants	91	63	.591	13	52‍–‍26	39‍–‍37
Pittsburgh Pirates	86	67	.562	17½	46‍–‍30	40‍–‍37
Philadelphia Phillies	78	75	.510	25½	40‍–‍36	38‍–‍39
Cincinnati Reds	75	79	.487	29	39‍–‍37	36‍–‍42
Brooklyn Superbas	64	90	.416	40	39‍–‍39	25‍–‍51
St. Louis Cardinals	63	90	.412	40½	35‍–‍41	28‍–‍49
Boston Doves	53	100	.346	50½	29‍–‍48	24‍–‍52

=== Record vs. opponents ===
1910 National League record Sources:
Team	BSN	BRO	CHC	CIN	NYG	PHI	PIT	STL
Boston	—	10–12	5–17	8–14–1	6–16–1	4–17–2	8–14	12–10
Brooklyn	12–10	—	6–16	7–15	8–14	9–13–1	10–12–1	12–10
Chicago	17–5	16–6	—	16–6	14–8	14–8	12–10	15–7
Cincinnati	14–8–1	15–7	6–16	—	8–14	10–12–1	10–12	12–10
New York	16–6–1	14–8	8–14	14–8	—	15–7	12–10	12–10
Philadelphia	17–4–2	13–9–1	8–14	12–10–1	7–15	—	11–11	10–12
Pittsburgh	14–8	12–10–1	10–12	12–10	10–12	11–11	—	17–4
St. Louis	10–12	10–12	7–15	10–12	10–12	12–10	4–17	—

=== Roster ===
1910 Philadelphia Phillies
Roster
Pitchers: Ad Brennan; George Chalmers; Bill Culp; Bob Ewing; Patsy Flaherty; Bill Foxen; Charlie Girard; Bert Humphries; George McQuillan; Earl Moore; Lew Moren; Jim Moroney; Lou Schettler; Barney Slaughter; Tully Sparks; Eddie Stack	Catchers: Harry Cheek; Red Dooin; Fred Jacklitsch; Ed McDonough; Pat Moran; Infielders: Kitty Bransfield; Mickey Doolan; Eddie Grant; Otto Knabe; Fred Luderus; Jimmy Walsh; Joe Ward	Outfielders: Johnny Bates; John Castle; Sherry Magee; Roy Thomas; John Titus	Manager: Red Dooin

== Player stats ==
=== Batting ===
==== Starters by position ====
Note: Pos = Position; G = Games played; AB = At bats; H = Hits; Avg. = Batting average; HR = Home runs; RBI = Runs batted in

Pos	Player	G	AB	H	Avg.	HR	RBI
C	Red Dooin	103	331	80	.242	0	30
1B	Kitty Bransfield	123	427	102	.239	3	52
2B	Otto Knabe	137	510	133	.261	1	44
SS	Mickey Doolin	148	536	141	.263	2	57
3B	Eddie Grant	152	579	155	.268	1	67
OF	Johnny Bates	135	498	152	.305	3	61
OF	John Titus	143	535	129	.241	3	35
OF	Sherry Magee	154	519	172	.331	6	123

==== Other batters ====
Note: G = Games played; AB = At bats; H = Hits; Avg. = Batting average; HR = Home runs; RBI = Runs batted in

Player	G	AB	H	Avg.	HR	RBI
Jimmy Walsh	88	242	60	.248	3	31
Pat Moran	68	199	47	.236	0	11
Joe Ward	48	124	18	.145	0	13
Roy Thomas	23	71	13	.183	0	4
Fred Luderus	21	68	20	.294	0	14
Fred Jacklitsch	25	51	10	.196	0	2
Ed McDonough	5	9	1	.111	0	0
John Castle	3	4	1	.250	0	0
Harry Cheek	2	4	2	.500	0	0

=== Pitching ===
==== Starting pitchers ====
Note: G = Games pitched; IP = Innings pitched; W = Wins; L = Losses; ERA = Earned run average; SO = Strikeouts

Player	G	IP	W	L	ERA	SO
Earl Moore	46	283.0	22	15	2.58	185
Bob Ewing	34	255.1	16	14	3.00	102
Lew Moren	34	205.1	13	14	3.55	74
George McQuillan	24	152.1	9	6	1.60	71
Eddie Stack	20	117.0	6	7	4.00	48
George Chalmers	4	22.0	1	1	5.32	12
Tully Sparks	3	15.0	0	2	6.00	4

==== Other pitchers ====
Note: G = Games pitched; IP = Innings pitched; W = Wins; L = Losses; ERA = Earned run average; SO = Strikeouts

Player	G	IP	W	L	ERA	SO
Lou Schettler	27	107.0	2	6	3.20	62
Bill Foxen	16	77.2	5	5	2.55	33
Ad Brennan	19	73.1	2	0	2.33	28
Jim Moroney	12	42.0	1	2	2.14	13
Charlie Girard	7	26.2	1	2	6.41	11
Barney Slaughter	8	18.0	0	1	5.50	7

==== Relief pitchers ====
Note: G = Games pitched; W = Wins; L = Losses; SV = Saves; ERA = Earned run average; SO = Strikeouts

Player	G	W	L	SV	ERA	SO
Bert Humphries	5	0	0	2	4.66	3
Bill Culp	4	0	0	1	8.10	4
Patsy Flaherty	1	0	0	0	0.00	0
