= 1910 New York Giants season =

1910 New York Giants
- League: National League
- Ballpark: Polo Grounds
- City: New York City
- Record: 93–61 (.604)
- League place: 2nd
- Owners: John T. Brush
- Managers: John McGraw

The 1910 New York Giants season was the franchise's 28th season. The team finished in second place in the National League with a 91–63 record, 13 games behind the Chicago Cubs.

The Giants offense scored the most runs in the NL. Fred Snodgrass had his breakthrough season, finishing fourth in the batting race and also leading the team in on-base percentage and OPS.

Their pitching staff was once again led by Hall of Famer Christy Mathewson, who won a league-best 27 games. His 1.89 earned run average ranked third.

== Regular season ==
=== Season standings ===
National League
Team	W	L	Pct.	GB	Home	Road
Chicago Cubs	104	50	.675	—	58‍–‍19	46‍–‍31
New York Giants	91	63	.591	13	52‍–‍26	39‍–‍37
Pittsburgh Pirates	86	67	.562	17½	46‍–‍30	40‍–‍37
Philadelphia Phillies	78	75	.510	25½	40‍–‍36	38‍–‍39
Cincinnati Reds	75	79	.487	29	39‍–‍37	36‍–‍42
Brooklyn Superbas	64	90	.416	40	39‍–‍39	25‍–‍51
St. Louis Cardinals	63	90	.412	40½	35‍–‍41	28‍–‍49
Boston Doves	53	100	.346	50½	29‍–‍48	24‍–‍52

=== Record vs. opponents ===
1910 National League record Sources:
Team	BSN	BRO	CHC	CIN	NYG	PHI	PIT	STL
Boston	—	10–12	5–17	8–14–1	6–16–1	4–17–2	8–14	12–10
Brooklyn	12–10	—	6–16	7–15	8–14	9–13–1	10–12–1	12–10
Chicago	17–5	16–6	—	16–6	14–8	14–8	12–10	15–7
Cincinnati	14–8–1	15–7	6–16	—	8–14	10–12–1	10–12	12–10
New York	16–6–1	14–8	8–14	14–8	—	15–7	12–10	12–10
Philadelphia	17–4–2	13–9–1	8–14	12–10–1	7–15	—	11–11	10–12
Pittsburgh	14–8	12–10–1	10–12	12–10	10–12	11–11	—	17–4
St. Louis	10–12	10–12	7–15	10–12	10–12	12–10	4–17	—

=== Roster ===
1910 New York Giants
Roster
Pitchers: Red Ames; Doc Crandall; Walt Dickson; Louis Drucke; Ed Hendricks; Al Klawitter; Rube Marquard; Christy Mathewson; Bugs Raymond; Dick Rudolph; Hooks Wiltse	Catchers: Chief Meyers; Admiral Schlei; Art Wilson; Infielders: Al Bridwell; Art Devlin; Larry Doyle; Art Fletcher; Hank Gowdy; Fred Merkle; Tillie Shafer	Outfielders: Beals Becker; Josh Devore; Willie Keeler; Red Murray; Cy Seymour; Fred Snodgrass; Elmer Zacher	Manager: John McGraw

== Player stats ==
=== Batting ===
==== Starters by position ====
Note: Pos = Position; G = Games played; AB = At bats; H = Hits; Avg. = Batting average; HR = Home runs; RBI = Runs batted in

Pos	Player	G	AB	H	Avg.	HR	RBI
C	Chief Meyers	127	365	104	.285	1	62
1B	Fred Merkle	144	506	148	.292	4	70
2B	Larry Doyle	151	575	164	.285	8	69
3B	Art Devlin	147	493	128	.260	2	67
SS	Al Bridwell	142	492	136	.276	0	48
OF	Josh Devore	133	490	149	.304	2	27
OF	Fred Snodgrass	123	396	127	.321	2	44
OF	Red Murray	149	553	153	.277	4	87

==== Other batters ====
Note: G = Games played; AB = At bats; H = Hits; Avg. = Batting average; HR = Home runs; RBI = Runs batted in

Player	G	AB	H	Avg.	HR	RBI
Cy Seymour	79	287	76	.265	1	40
Beals Becker	80	126	36	.286	3	24
Art Fletcher	51	125	28	.224	0	13
Admiral Schlei	55	99	19	.192	0	8
Art Wilson	26	52	14	.269	0	5
Tillie Shafer	29	21	4	.190	0	1
Hank Gowdy	7	14	3	.214	0	2
Willie Keeler	19	10	3	.300	0	0
Elmer Zacher	1	0	0	----	0	0

=== Pitching ===
==== Starting pitchers ====
Note: G = Games pitched; IP = Innings pitched; W = Wins; L = Losses; ERA = Earned run average; SO = Strikeouts

Player	G	IP	W	L	ERA	SO
Christy Mathewson	38	318.1	27	9	1.89	184
Hooks Wiltse	36	235.1	14	12	2.72	88
Louis Drucke	34	215.1	12	10	2.47	151
Red Ames	33	190.1	12	11	2.22	94

==== Other pitchers ====
Note: G = Games pitched; IP = Innings pitched; W = Wins; L = Losses; ERA = Earned run average; SO = Strikeouts

Player	G	IP	W	L	ERA	SO
Doc Crandall	42	207.2	17	4	2.56	73
Bugs Raymond	19	99.1	4	11	3.81	55
Rube Marquard	13	70.2	4	4	4.46	52
Dick Rudolph	3	12.0	0	1	7.50	9
Ed Hendricks	4	12.0	0	1	3.75	2

==== Relief pitchers ====
Note: G = Games pitched; W = Wins; L = Losses; SV = Saves; ERA = Earned run average; SO = Strikeouts

Player	G	W	L	SV	ERA	SO
Walt Dickson	12	1	0	0	5.46	9
Al Klawitter	1	0	0	0	9.00	0

== Awards and honors ==
=== League top ten finishers ===
Red Ames

- #4 in NL in ERA (2.22)

Larry Doyle

- #4 in NL in runs scored (97)

Louis Drucke

- #4 in NL in strikeouts (151)

Christy Mathewson

- NL leader in wins (27)
- #2 in NL in strikeouts (184)
- #3 in NL in ERA (1.89)

Fred Merkle

- #4 in NL in slugging percentage (.441)

Red Murray

- #2 in NL in stolen bases (57)
- #3 in NL in RBI (87)

Fred Snodgrass

- #2 in NL in on-base percentage (.440)
- #4 in NL in batting average (.321)
