= Philadelphia Phillies all-time roster (C) =

List of baseball players

The Philadelphia Phillies are a Major League Baseball team based in Philadelphia, Pennsylvania. They are a member of the Eastern Division of Major League Baseball's National League. The team has played officially under two names since beginning play in 1883: the current moniker, as well as the "Quakers", which was used in conjunction with "Phillies" during the team's early history. The team was also known unofficially as the "Blue Jays" during the World War II era. Since the franchise's inception, 2,081 players have made an appearance in a competitive game for the team, whether as an offensive player (batting and baserunning) or a defensive player (fielding, pitching, or both).

Of those 2,081 Phillies, 143 have had surnames beginning with the letter C. Two of those players have been inducted into the Baseball Hall of Fame: pitcher Steve Carlton, who pitched for Philadelphia from 1972 to 1986; and first baseman Roger Connor, who appeared for the Phillies in the 1892 season. The Hall of Fame lists the Phillies as Carlton's primary team, and he is a member of the Philadelphia Baseball Wall of Fame, as are right fielders Johnny Callison and Gavvy Cravath. The Phillies have also retired Carlton's number 32, the only player on this list so honored. Carlton holds two franchise records, leading all Phillies pitchers with 241 victories and 3,031 strikeouts.

Among the 78 batters in this list, catcher Harry Cheek and shortstop Todd Cruz have the highest batting average, at .500; each recorded two hits in four career at-bats. Other players with an average above .300 include Ben Chapman (.308 in two seasons), Billy Consolo (.400 in one season), Duff Cooley (.308 in four seasons), Ed Cotter (.308 in one season), and Midre Cummings (.303 in one season). Callison's 185 home runs lead all players on this list, as do Cravath's 676 runs batted in.

Of this list's 66 pitchers, two—Milo Candini and Steve Comer—have undefeated win–loss records: Candini with a 2–0 mark; and Comer with one victory and no defeats. Carlton's franchise-record 241 wins lead all pitchers on this list, as do his 161 losses. Mitch Chetkovich is the only member of this list with an earned run average (ERA) of 0.00, allowing no runs in three innings pitched. Among pitchers who have allowed earned runs, Harry Coveleski has the best average (2.09). Carlton's strikeout total of 3,031 is the most among all Phillies pitchers.

One player, Bert Conn, has made 30% or more of his Phillies appearances as a pitcher and a position player. He amassed an 0–3 pitching record with a 7.77 ERA while batting .267 with three extra-base hits and seven runs scored.

Key to symbols in player list(s)
| † or ‡ | Indicates a member of the National Baseball Hall of Fame and Museum; ‡ indicates that the Phillies are the player's primary team^{[H]} |
| § | Indicates a member of the Philadelphia Baseball Wall of Fame |
| * | Indicates a team record^{[R]} |
| (#) | A number following a player's name indicates that the number was retired by the Phillies in the player's honor. |
| Year | Italic text indicates that the player is a member of the Phillies' active (25-man) roster. |
| Position(s) | Indicates the player's primary position(s)^{[P]} |
| Notes | Statistics shown only for playing time with Phillies^{[S]} |
| Ref | References |

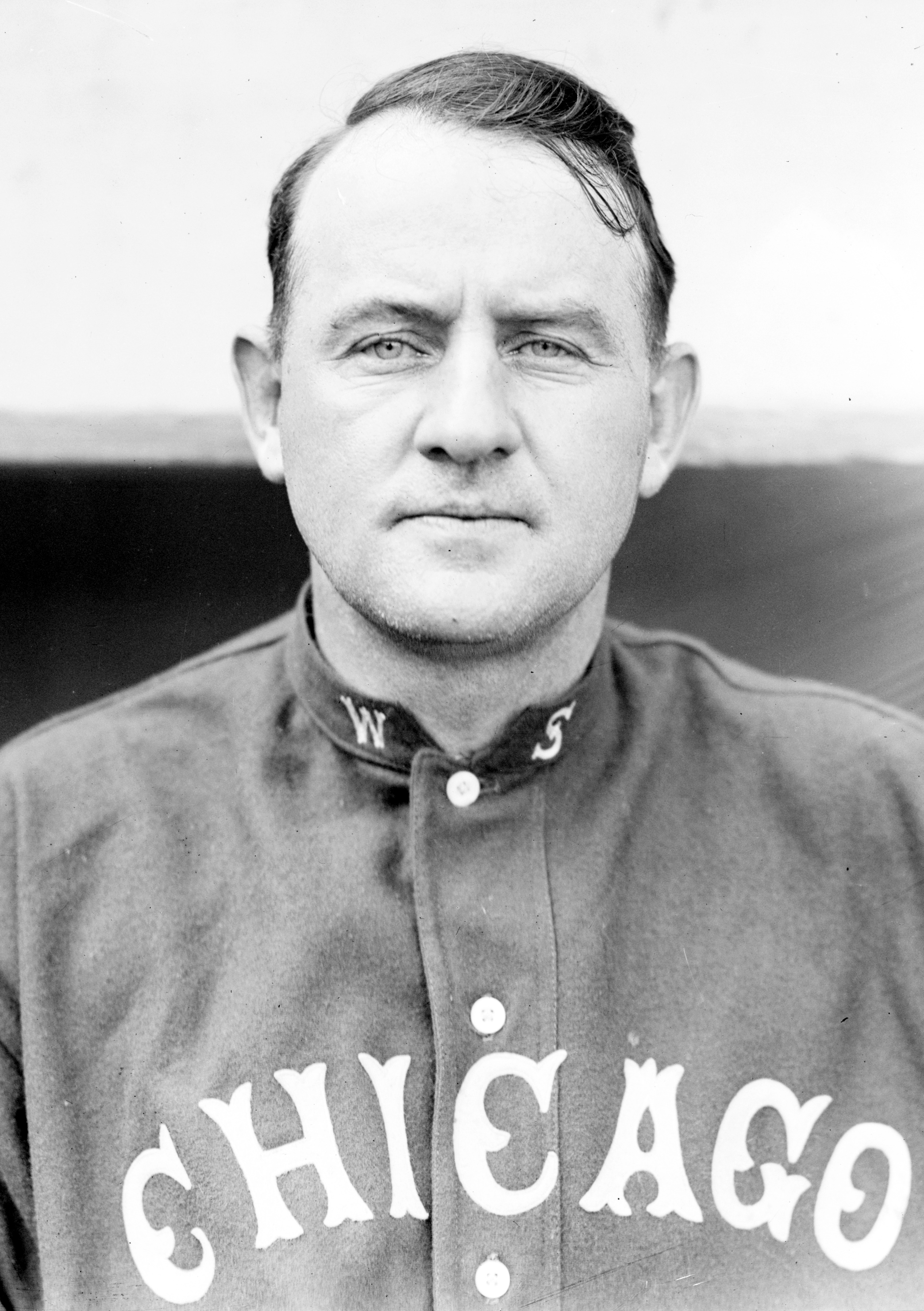
Nixey Callahan pitched for the Phillies in the 1894 season.

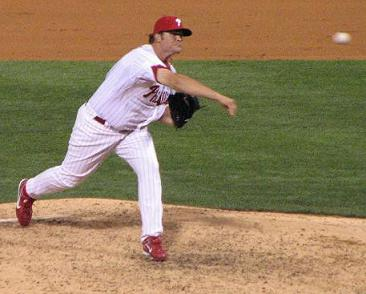
Drew Carpenter made his Phillies debut in 2008.

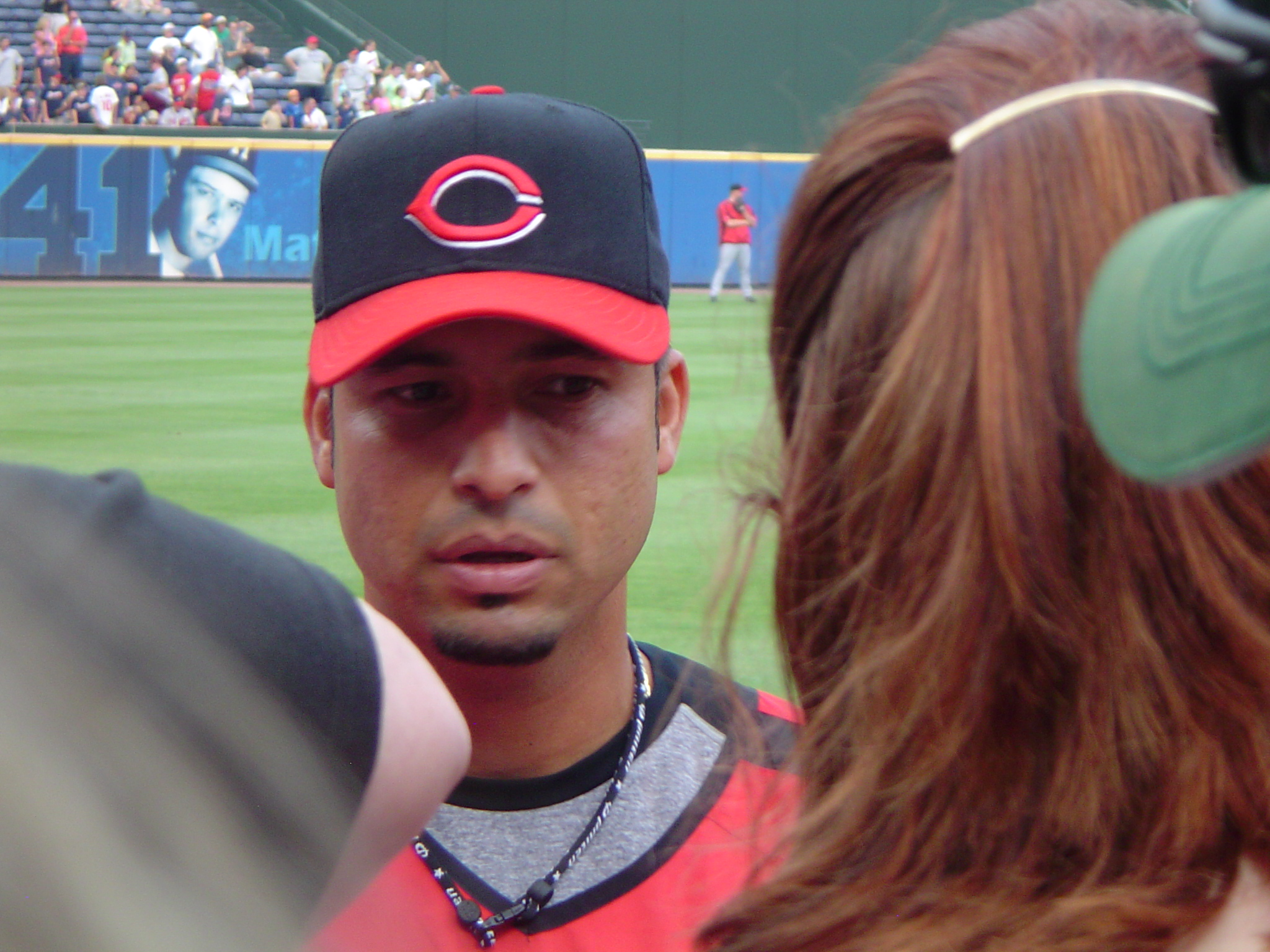
Shortstop Juan Castro played for Philadelphia in 2010.

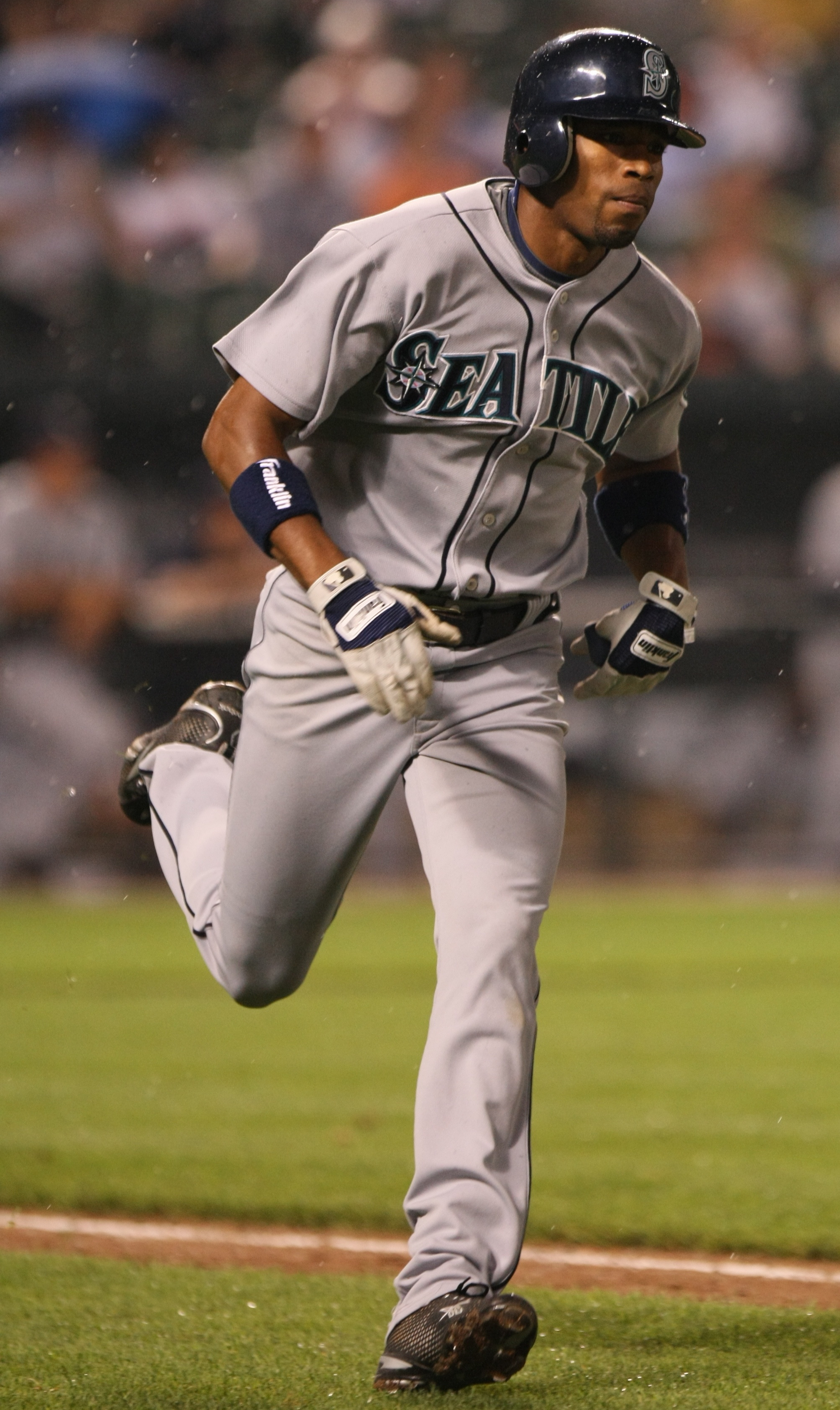
Outfielder Endy Chávez hit three triples for the Phillies in 2005.

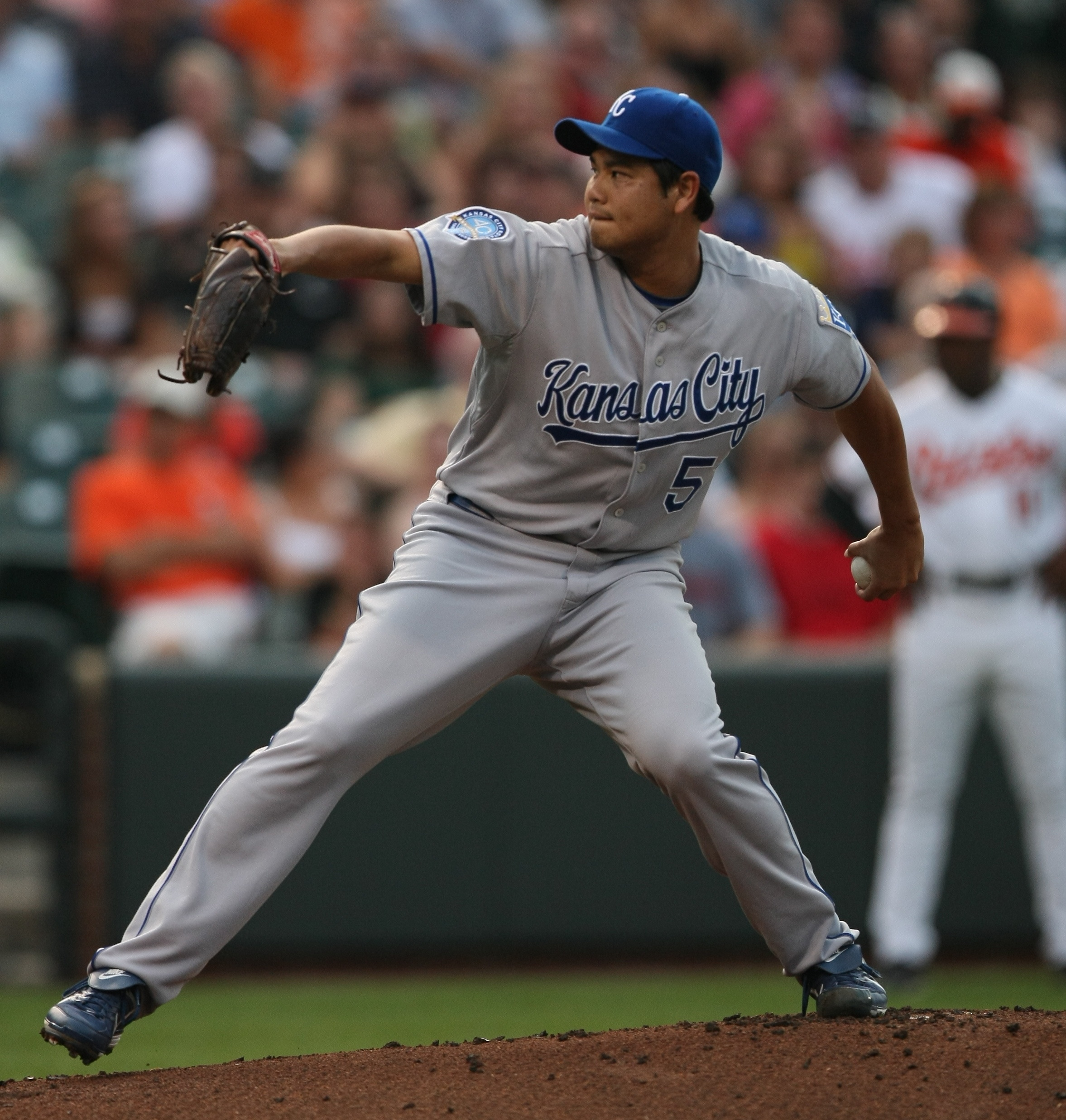
Bruce Chen won seven games for the Phillies over his two-season tenure.

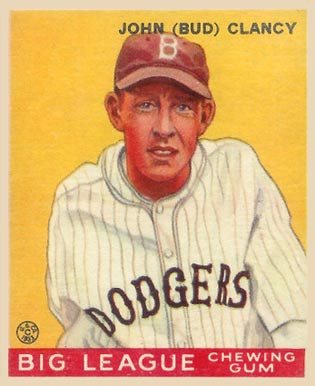
Bud Clancy hit one home run with Philadelphia in the 1934 season.

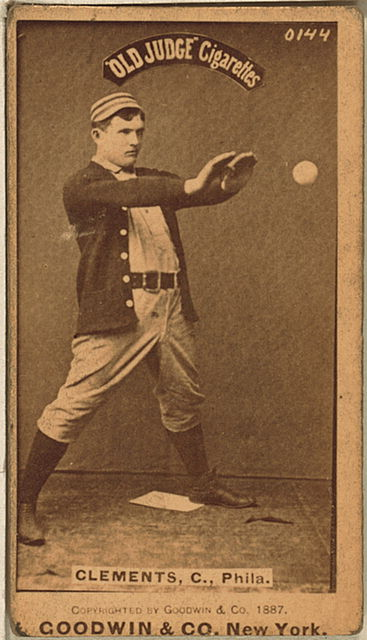
Jack Clements, a left-handed catcher, caught over 900 games with the Phillies franchise in the 19th century.

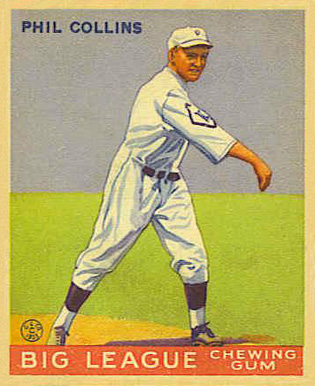
Through seven seasons, Phil Collins won more, and lost more, than 70 games.

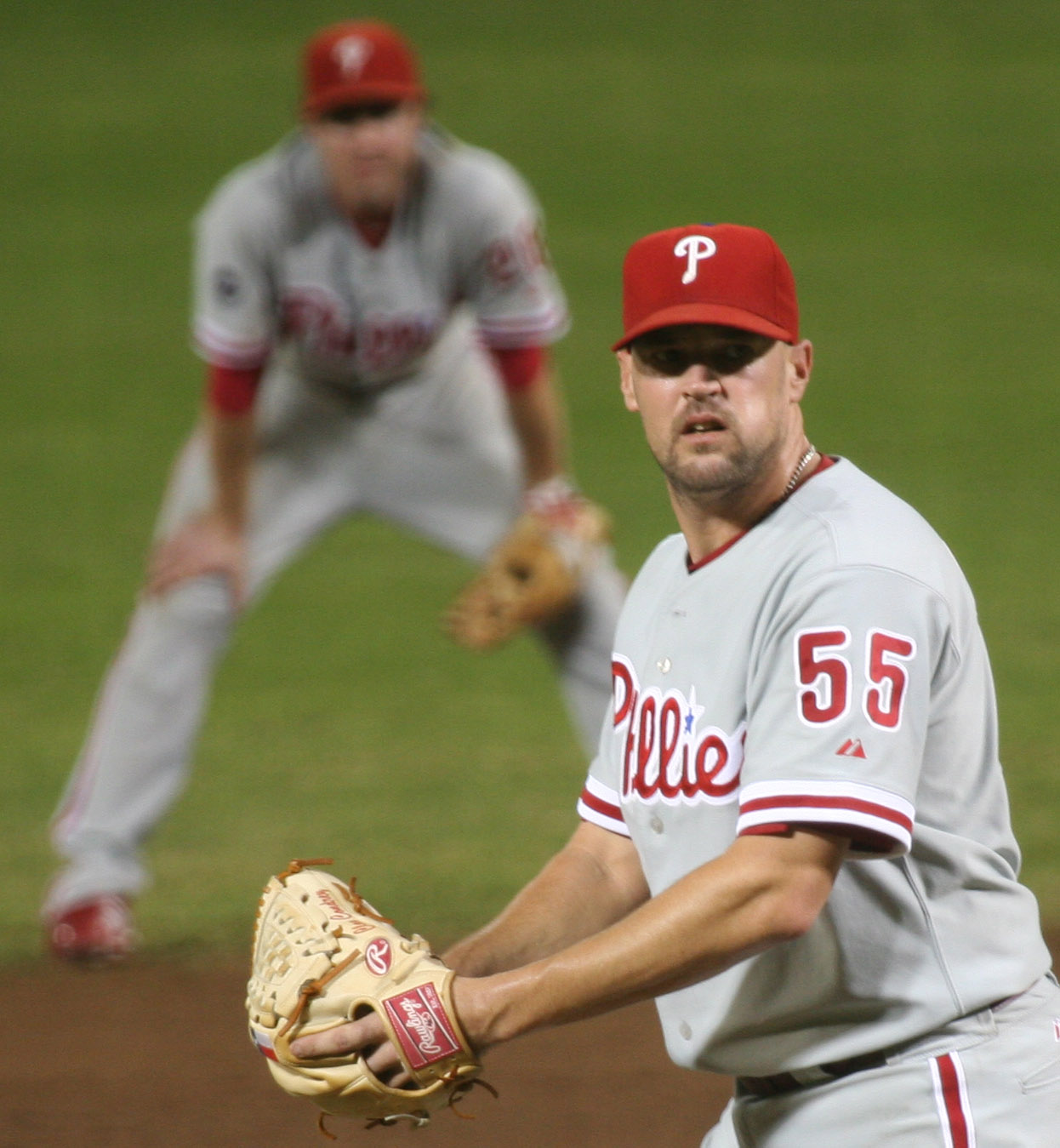
Clay Condrey won twice as many games as he lost in his four-season Phillies career.

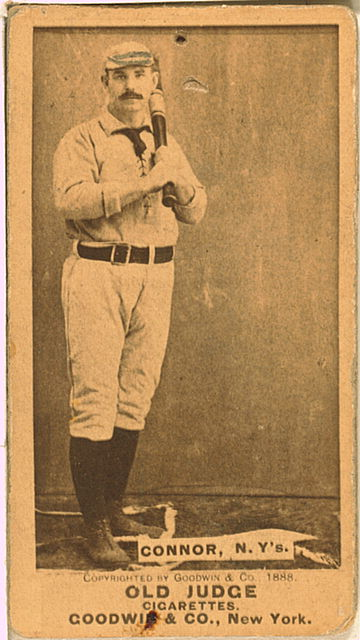
Hall of Fame first baseman Roger Connor played for the Phillies in 1892.

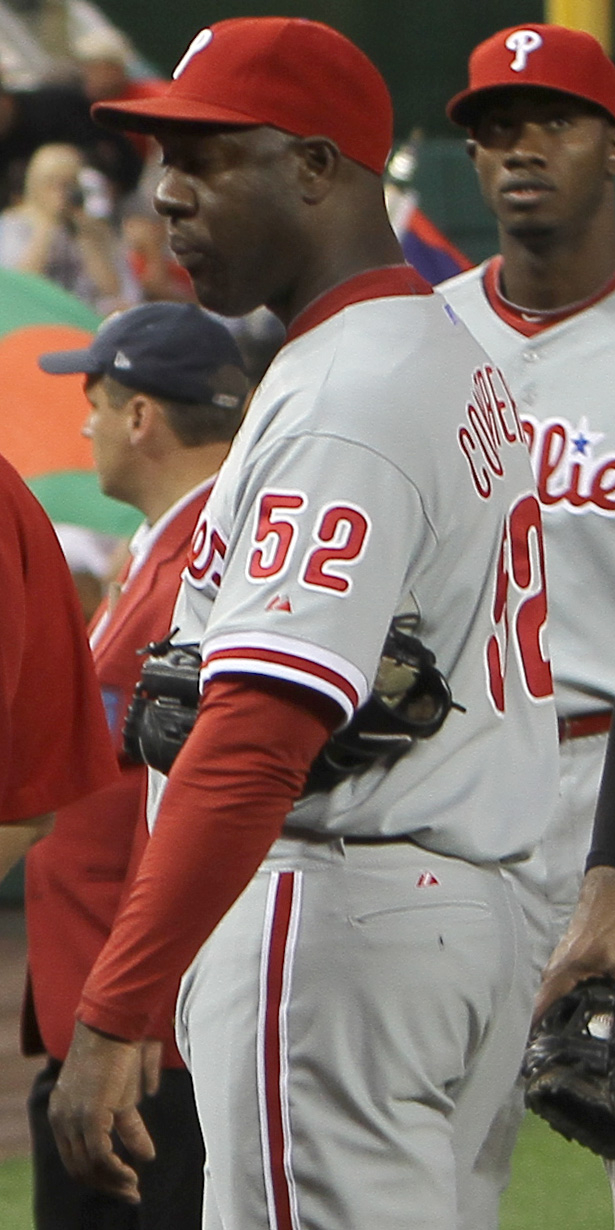
José Contreras was a starting pitcher, relief pitcher, and closer for the Phillies in 2010.

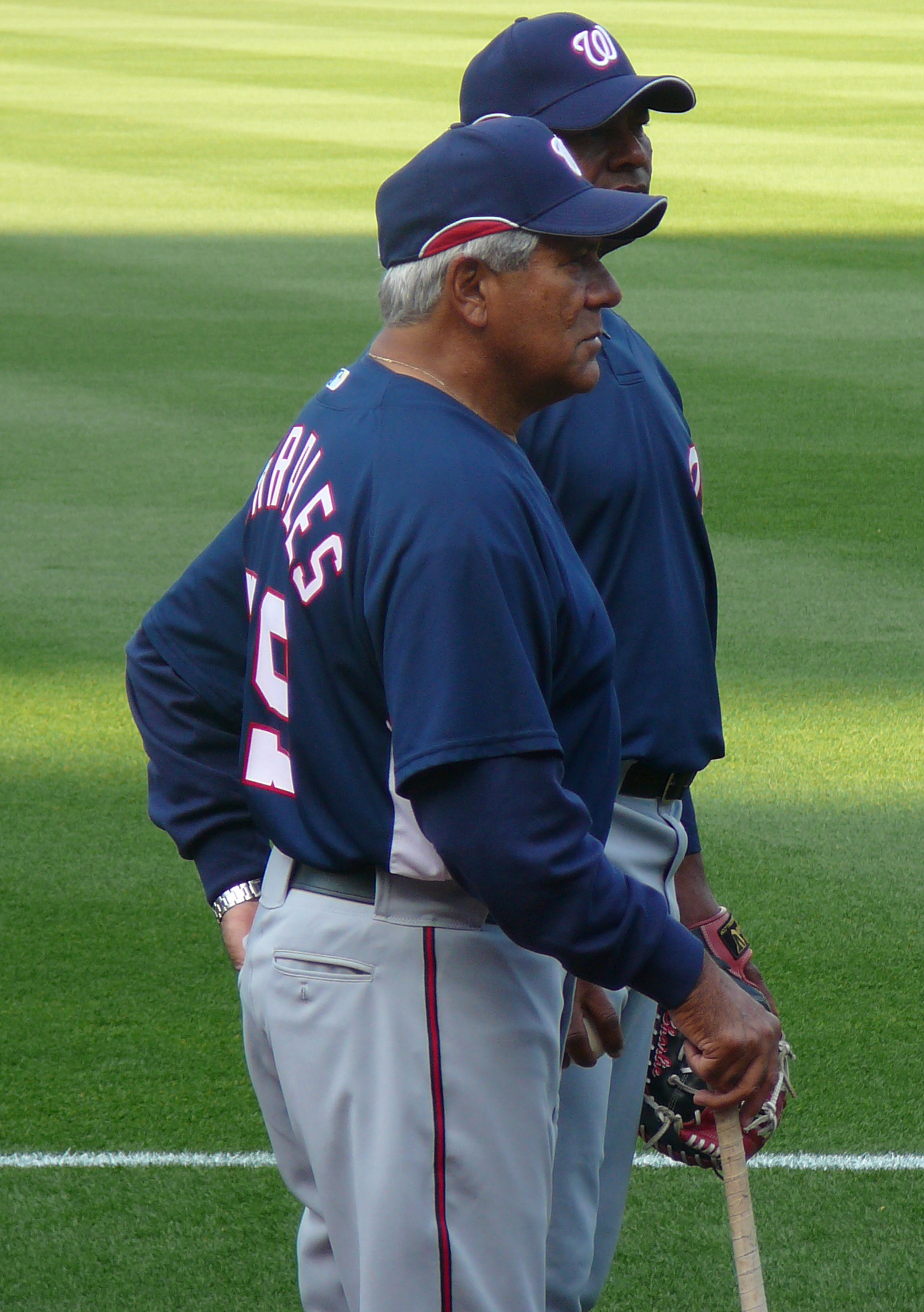
Pat Corrales caught with the Phillies for two seasons.

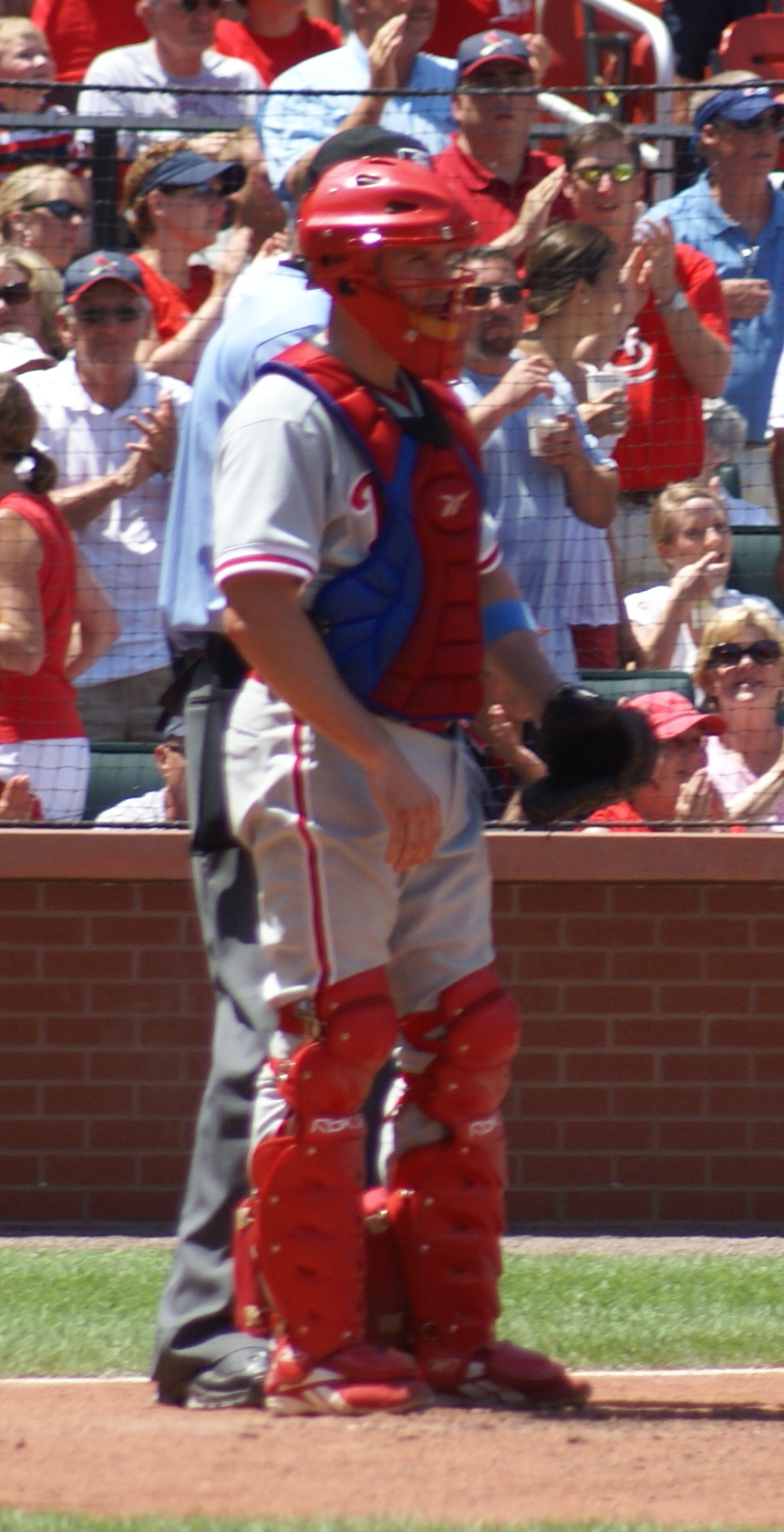
Chris Coste debuted with Philadelphia in 2006 at age 33 after an 11-season minor league career, later writing a book about his experience.

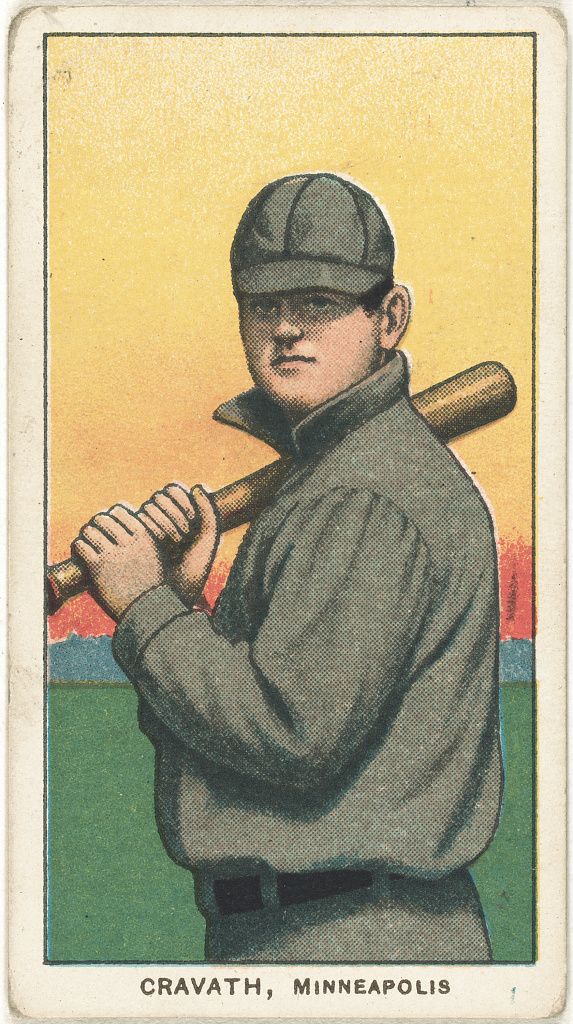
Gavvy Cravath's 119 home runs (117 with the Phillies) were the most among active major leaguers before he was surpassed by Babe Ruth.

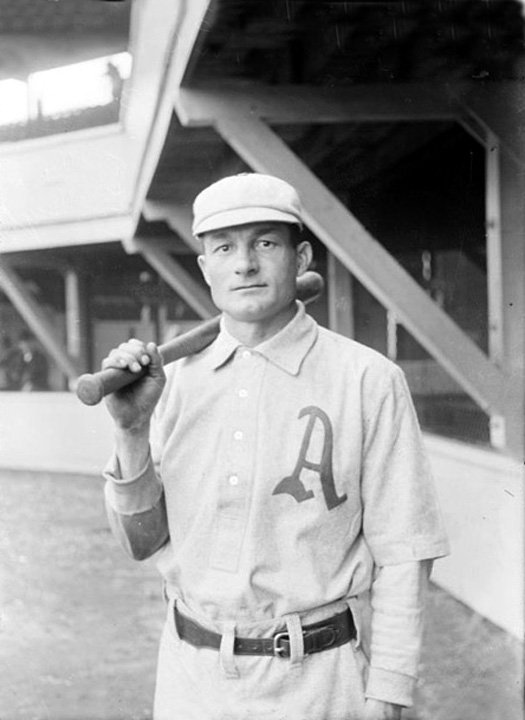
Third baseman Lave Cross batted .295 during his Phillies career.

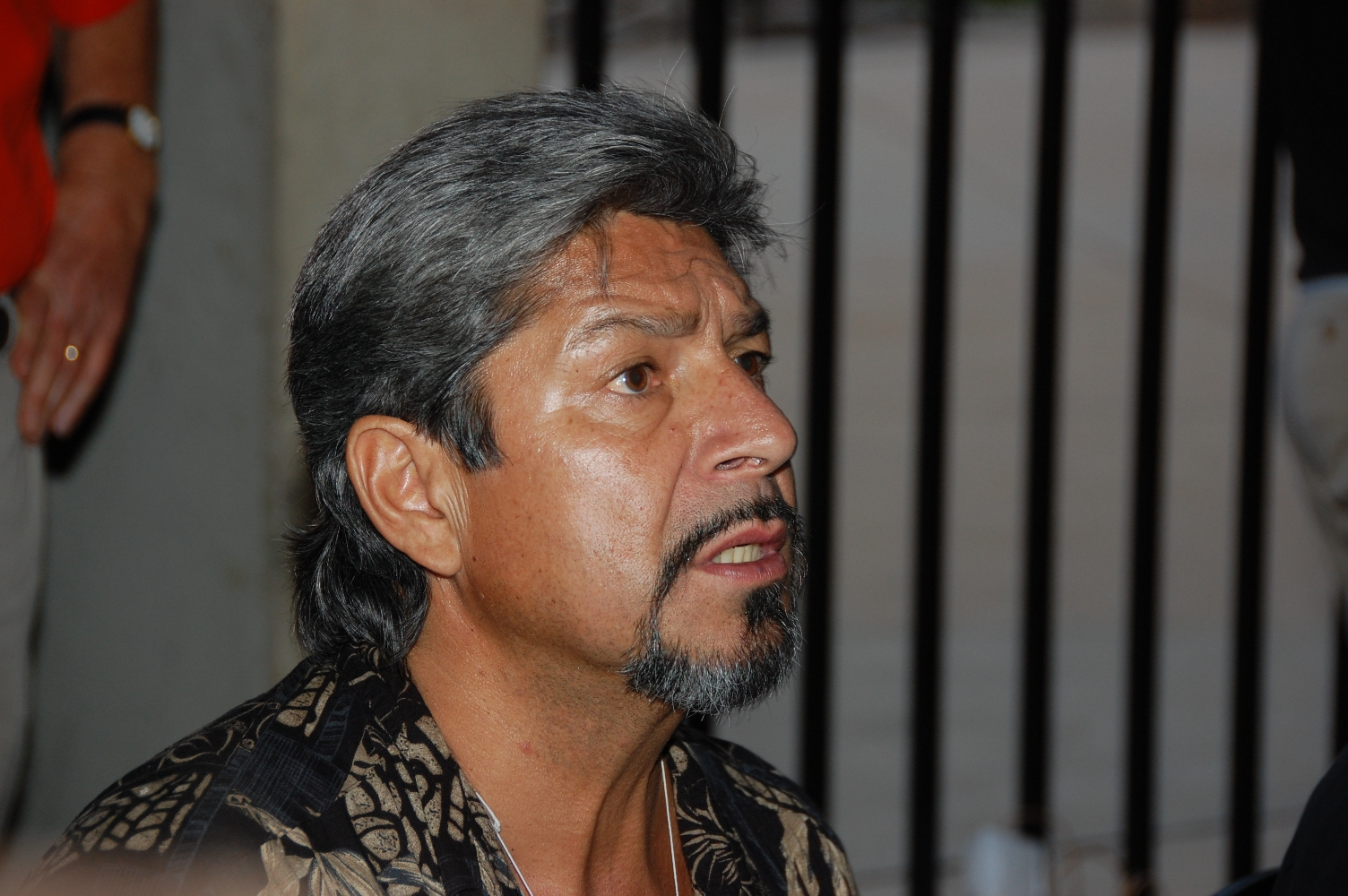
Todd Cruz notched two singles in his short tenure with Philadelphia.

List of players whose surnames begin with C, showing season(s) and position(s) played and selected statistics
| Name | Season(s) | Position(s) | Notes | Ref |
|---|---|---|---|---|
| Putsy Caballero | 1944–1945; 1947–1952 | Second baseman Third baseman | .228 batting average; 1 home run; 40 runs batted in | |
| Hick Cady | 1919 | Catcher | .214 batting average; 1 home run; 19 runs batted in | |
| Miguel Cairo | 2009 | Second baseman Shortstop | .267 batting average; 1 home run; 2 runs batted in | |
| Earl Caldwell | 1928 | Pitcher | 1–4 record; 5.71 earned run average; 6 strikeouts | |
| Ralph Caldwell | 1904–1905 | Pitcher | 3–5 record; 4.20 earned run average; 59 strikeouts | |
| Jeff Calhoun | 1987–1988 | Pitcher | 3–1 record; 2.20 earned run average; 32 strikeouts | |
| Leo Callahan | 1919 | Right fielder | .230 batting average; 1 home run; 9 runs batted in | |
| Nixey Callahan | 1894 | Pitcher | 1–2 record; 9.89 earned run average; 9 strikeouts | |
| Johnny Callison^{§} | 1960–1969 | Right fielder | .271 batting average; 185 home runs; 666 runs batted in | |
| Dolph Camilli | 1934–1937 | First baseman | .295 batting average; 92 home runs; 333 runs batted in | |
| Howie Camnitz | 1913 | Pitcher | 3–3 record; 3.67 earned run average; 21 strikeouts | |
| Bill Campbell | 1984 | Pitcher | 6–5 record; 3.43 earned run average; 52 strikeouts | |
| Sil Campusano | 1990–1991 | Center fielder | .183 batting average; 3 home runs; 11 runs batted in | |
| Milo Candini | 1950–1951 | Pitcher | 2–0 record; 4.35 earned run average; 24 strikeouts | |
| Mike Cantwell | 1919–1920 | Pitcher | 1–6 record; 4.80 earned run average; 14 strikeouts | |
| Ralph Capron | 1913 | Left fielder | .000 batting average; 1 run scored; 1 plate appearance | |
| José Cardenal | 1978–1979 | First baseman | .241 batting average; 4 home runs; 42 runs batted in | |
| Don Cardwell | 1957–1960 | Pitcher | 17–26 record; 4.46 earned run average; 296 strikeouts | |
| Jim Carlin | 1941 | Right fielder Center fielder | .143 batting average; 1 home run; 2 runs batted in | |
| Hal Carlson | 1924–1927 | Pitcher | 42–48 record; 4.13 earned run average; 214 strikeouts | |
| Steve Carlton^{‡§} (#32) | 1972–1986 | Pitcher | 241*–161 record; 3.09 earned run average; 3,031 strikeouts* | |
| Don Carman | 1983–1990 | Pitcher | 53–52 record; 4.06 earned run average; 581 strikeouts | |
| Drew Carpenter | 2008–2011 | Pitcher | 1–1 record; 8.53 earned run average; 18 strikeouts | |
| Amalio Carreño | 1991 | Pitcher | 16.20 earned run average; 2 strikeouts; 3 walks | |
| Kid Carsey | 1892–1897 | Pitcher | 94–71 record; 4.72 earned run average; 270 strikeouts | |
| Andy Carter | 1994–1995 | Pitcher | 0–2 record; 4.75 earned run average; 24 strikeouts | |
| Dan Casey | 1886–1889 | Pitcher | 72–59 record; 2.91 earned run average; 485 strikeouts | |
| Dave Cash | 1974–1976 | Second baseman | .296 batting average; 7 home runs; 171 runs batted in | |
| Ed Cassian | 1891 | Pitcher | 1–3 record; 2.84 earned run average; 10 strikeouts | |
| Braulio Castillo | 1991–1992 | Center fielder Right fielder | .188 batting average; 2 home runs; 9 runs batted in | |
| John Castle | 1910 | Left fielder Center fielder | .250 batting average; 1 run scored; 1 stolen base | |
| Fabio Castro | 2006–2007 | Pitcher | 0–1 record; 3.06 earned run average; 27 strikeouts | |
| Juan Castro | 2010 | Shortstop | .198 batting average; 5 doubles; 13 runs batted in | |
| Danny Cater | 1964 | Left fielder | .296 batting average; 1 home run; 13 runs batted in | |
| Red Causey | 1920–1921 | Pitcher | 10–17 record; 4.00 earned run average; 38 strikeouts | |
| John Cavanaugh | 1919 | Third baseman | .000 batting average; 1 plate appearance; 1 strikeout | |
| Domingo Cedeño | 1999 | Shortstop | .152 batting average; 1 home run; 5 runs batted in | |
| Mike Cervenak | 2007 | Third baseman | .154 batting average; 2 hits; 1 run batted in | |
| George Chalmers | 1910–1916 | Pitcher | 29–41 record; 3.41 earned run average; 290 strikeouts | |
| Wes Chamberlain | 1990–1994 | Right fielder Left fielder | .260 batting average; 38 home runs; 146 runs batted in | |
| Bill Champion | 1969–1972 | Pitcher | 12–31 record; 5.01 earned run average; 185 strikeouts | |
| Darrin Chapin | 1992 | Pitcher | 9.00 earned run average; 1 strikeout; 2 innings pitched | |
| Ben Chapman | 1945–1946 | Center fielder | .308 batting average; 2 doubles; 4 runs batted in | |
| Travis Chapman | 2003 | Third baseman | .000 batting average; 1 plate appearance | |
| Norm Charlton | 1995 | Pitcher | 2–5 record; 7.36 earned run average; 12 strikeouts | |
| Endy Chávez | 2005 | Center fielder Left fielder | .215 batting average; 3 triples; 10 runs batted in | |
| Harry Cheek | 1910 | Catcher | .500 batting average; 1 double; 4 plate appearances | |
| Bruce Chen | 2000–2001 | Pitcher | 7–9 record; 4.28 earned run average; 159 strikeouts | |
| Larry Cheney | 1919 | Pitcher | 2–5 record; 4.55 earned run average; 25 strikeouts | |
| Mitch Chetkovich | 1945 | Pitcher | 0.00 earned run average; 4 games played; 3 walks | |
| Rocky Childress | 1985–1986 | Pitcher | 0–1 record; 6.25 earned run average; 15 strikeouts | |
| Cupid Childs | 1888 | Second baseman | .000 batting average; 4 plate appearances | |
| Pete Childs | 1902 | Second baseman | .194 batting average; 5 doubles; 25 runs batted in | |
| Pearce Chiles | 1899–1900 | Outfielder; First baseman | .294 batting average; 3 home runs; 99 runs batted in | |
| Dino Chiozza | 1935 | Shortstop | 2 games played; 0 plate appearances; 1 run scored | |
| Lou Chiozza | 1934–1936 | Second baseman | .295 batting average; 4 home runs; 139 runs batted in | |
| Larry Christenson | 1973–1983 | Pitcher | 83–71 record; 3.79 earned run average; 781 strikeouts | |
| Bubba Church | 1950–1952 | Pitcher | 23–17 record; 3.34 earned run average; 157 strikeouts | |
| Ted Cieslak | 1944 | Third baseman | .245 batting average; 2 home runs; 11 runs batted in | |
| Bud Clancy | 1934 | First baseman | .245 batting average; 1 home run; 7 runs batted in | |
| Cap Clark | 1938 | Catcher | .257 batting average; 1 triple; 4 runs batted in | |
| Mel Clark | 1951–1955 | Right fielder | .280 batting average; 3 home runs; 62 runs batted in | |
| Ron Clark | 1975 | Pinch hitter^{[a]} | .000 batting average; 1 plate appearance | |
| Nig Clarke | 1919 | Catcher | .242 batting average; 3 doubles; 2 runs batted in | |
| Bill Clay | 1902 | Left fielder | .250 batting average; 2 singles; 1 run batted in | |
| Danny Clay | 1988 | Pitcher | 0–1 record; 6.00 earned run average; 12 strikeouts | |
| Doug Clemens | 1966–1968 | Left fielder Right fielder | .223 batting average; 3 home runs; 27 runs batted in | |
| Wally Clement | 1908–1909 | Left fielder | .205 batting average; 3 doubles; 1 run batted in | |
| Jack Clements | 1884–1897 | Catcher | .289 batting average; 70 home runs; 636 runs batted in | |
| Dave Coble | 1939 | Catcher | .280 batting average; 1 double; 2 runs scored | |
| Dick Coffman | 1945 | Pitcher | 2–1 record; 5.13 earned run average; 2 strikeouts | |
| Dave Coggin | 2000–2002 | Pitcher | 10–12 record; 4.52 earned run average; 143 strikeouts | |
| Alta Cohen | 1933 | Left fielder | .188 batting average; 1 double; 1 run batted in | |
| Jimmie Coker | 1958; 1960–1962 | Catcher | .227 batting average; 7 home runs; 39 runs batted in | |
| Dave Cole | 1955 | Pitcher | 0–3 record; 6.38 earned run average; 6 strikeouts | |
| Choo-Choo Coleman | 1961 | Catcher | .128 batting average; 1 double; 4 runs batted in | |
| John F. Coleman | 1883–1884 | Pitcher | 17–63 record; 4.87 earned run average; 196 strikeouts | |
| John W. Coleman | 1890 | Pitcher | 0–1 record; 21.60 earned run average; 2 strikeouts | |
| Hap Collard | 1930 | Pitcher | 6–12 record; 6.80 earned run average; 25 strikeouts | |
| Lou Collier | 2004 | Left fielder | .278 batting average; 1 home run; 4 runs batted in | |
| Phil Collins | 1929–1935 | Pitcher | 72–79 record; 4.67 earned run average; 403 strikeouts | |
| Larry Colton | 1968 | Pitcher | 4.50 earned run average; 2 innings pitched; 2 strikeouts | |
| Pat Combs | 1989–1992 | Pitcher | 17–17 record; 4.22 earned run average; 190 strikeouts | |
| Steve Comer | 1983 | Pitcher | 1–0 record; 5.19 earned run average; 1 strikeout | |
| Jim Command | 1954–1955 | Third baseman | .174 batting average; 1 home run; 6 runs batted in | |
| Mike Compton | 1970 | Catcher | .164 batting average; 1 home run; 7 runs batted in | |
| Clay Condrey | 2006–2009 | Pitcher | 16–8 record; 3.65 earned run average; 102 strikeouts | |
| Dick Conger | 1943 | Pitcher | 2–7 record; 6.09 earned run average; 18 strikeouts | |
| Jeff Conine | 2006 | Right fielder Left fielder | .280 batting average; 1 home run; 17 runs batted in | |
| Bob Conley | 1958 | Pitcher | 7.56 earned run average; 8 1/3 innings pitched; 1 walk | |
| Gene Conley | 1959–1960 | Pitcher | 20–21 record; 3.34 earned run average; 219 strikeouts | |
| Bert Conn | 1898–1901 | Pitcher; Second baseman | 0–3 record; 7.77 earned run average; .267 batting average; 1 run batted in | |
| Gene Connell | 1931 | Catcher | .250 batting average; 3 singles; 1 run scored | |
| Roger Connor^{†} | 1892 | First baseman | .294 batting average; 12 home runs; 73 runs batted in | |
| Jerry Connors | 1892 | Right fielder | .000 batting average; 3 plate appearances; 1 strikeout | |
| Billy Consolo | 1962 | Third baseman | .400 batting average; 2 singles; 5 plate appearances | |
| José Contreras | 2010–2011 | Pitcher | 6–4 record; 3.44 earned run average; 70 strikeouts | |
| Bill Conway | 1884 | Catcher | .000 batting average; 4 plate appearances; 1 strikeout | |
| Dennis Cook | 1989–1990; 2001 | Pitcher | 14–11 record; 3.81 earned run average; 120 strikeouts | |
| Paul Cook | 1884 | Catcher | .083 batting average; 12 plate appearances; 1 strikeout | |
| Duff Cooley | 1896–1899 | Center fielder | .308 batting average; 11 home runs; 148 runs batted in | |
| Jimmy Cooney | 1927 | Shortstop | .270 batting average; 12 doubles; 15 runs batted in | |
| Claude Cooper | 1916–1917 | Left fielder Center fielder | .173 batting average; 3 doubles; 12 runs batted in | |
| Gene Corbett | 1936–1938 | First baseman | .120 batting average; 2 home runs; 10 runs batted in | |
| Tim Corcoran | 1983–1985 | First baseman | .282 batting average; 5 home runs; 58 runs batted in | |
| Rheal Cormier | 2001–2006 | Pitcher | 28–21 record; 3.62 earned run average; 246 strikeouts | |
| Pat Corrales | 1964–1965 | Catcher | .223 batting average; 2 home runs; 15 runs batted in | |
| Frank Corridon | 1904–1905; 1907–1909 | Pitcher | 59–48 record; 2.61 earned run average; 373 strikeouts | |
| Chris Coste | 2006–2009 | Catcher | .282 batting average; 23 home runs; 98 batting average | |
| Dick Cotter | 1911 | Catcher | .283 batting average; 13 hits; 5 runs batted in | |
| Ed Cotter | 1926 | Third baseman Shortstop | .308 batting average; 1 triple; 1 run batted in | |
| Johnny Couch | 1923–1925 | Pitcher | 11–18 record; 5.07 earned run average; 52 strikeouts | |
| Ernie Courtney | 1905–1908 | Third baseman | .247 batting average; 13 triples; 168 runs batted in | |
| Harry Coveleski | 1907–1909 | Pitcher | 11–11 record; 2.09 earned run average; 84 strikeouts | |
| Chet Covington | 1944 | Pitcher | 1–1 record; 4.66 earned run average; 13 strikeouts | |
| Wes Covington | 1961–1965 | Left fielder | .284 batting average; 61 home runs; 237 runs batted in | |
| Billy Cowan | 1967 | Left fielder | .153 batting average; 3 home runs; 6 runs batted in | |
| Joe Cowley | 1987 | Pitcher | 0–4 record; 15.43 earned run average; 5 strikeouts | |
| Danny Cox | 1991–1992 | Pitcher | 6–8 record; 4.80 earned run average; 76 strikeouts | |
| Larry Cox | 1973–1975 | Catcher | .172 batting average; 2 doubles; 5 runs batted in | |
| Roger Craig | 1966 | Pitcher | 2–1 record; 5.56 earned run average; 13 strikeouts | |
| Gavvy Cravath^{§} | 1912–1920 | Right fielder | .291 batting average; 117 home runs; 676 runs batted in | |
| Carlos Crawford | 1996 | Pitcher | 0–1 record; 4.91 earned run average; 4 strikeouts | |
| Glenn Crawford | 1945–1946 | Shortstop; Right fielder | .294 batting average; 2 home runs; 24 runs batted in | |
| Larry Crawford | 1937 | Pitcher | 15.00 earned run average; 2 strikeouts; 1 walk | |
| Felipe Crespo | 2001 | Left fielder | .171 batting average; 3 doubles; 5 runs batted in | |
| Ches Crist | 1906 | Catcher | .000 batting average; 12 plate appearances; 1 run scored | |
| Leo Cristante | 1951 | Pitcher | 1–1 record; 4.91 earned run average; 6 strikeouts | |
| Harry Croft | 1899 | Second baseman | .143 batting average; 8 plate appearances; 1 walk | |
| Lave Cross | 1892–1897 | Third baseman | .295 batting average; 21 home runs; 504 runs batted in | |
| Monte Cross | 1898–1901 | Shortstop | .230 batting average; 8 home runs; 221 runs batted in | |
| Bill Crouch | 1941 | Pitcher | 2–3 record; 4.42 earned run average; 26 strikeouts | |
| Jim Crowell | 2004 | Pitcher | 3.00 earned run average; 1 strikeout; 2 runs allowed | |
| John Crowley | 1884 | Catcher | .244 batting average; 7 doubles; 19 runs batted in | |
| Roy Crumpler | 1925 | Pitcher | 7.71 earned run average; 1 strikeout; 2 walks | |
| Todd Cruz | 1978 | Shortstop | .500 batting average; 2 singles; 2 runs batted in | |
| Benny Culp | 1942–1944 | Catcher | .192 batting average; 1 double; 2 runs batted in | |
| Bill Culp | 1910 | Pitcher | 8.10 earned run average; 4 strikeouts; 4 walks | |
| Ray Culp | 1963–1966 | Pitcher | 43–32 record; 3.64 earned run average; 506 strikeouts | |
| George Culver | 1973–1974 | Pitcher | 4–1 record; 5.80 earned run average; 16 strikeouts | |
| Midre Cummings | 1997 | Center fielder | .303 batting average; 1 home run; 23 runs batted in | |
| Tony Curry | 1960–1961 | Left fielder | .253 batting average; 6 home runs; 37 runs batted in | |
| Cliff Curtis | 1911–1912 | Pitcher | 4–6 record; 2.94 earned run average; 33 strikeouts | |
| Andy Cusick | 1884–1887 | Catcher | .198 batting average; 7 doubles; 15 runs batted in | |

== Footnotes ==
Key

- ^{H} The National Baseball Hall of Fame and Museum determines which cap a player wears on their plaque, signifying "the team with which he made his most indelible mark". The Hall of Fame considers the player's wishes in making their decision, but the Hall makes the final decision as "it is important that the logo be emblematic of the historical accomplishments of that player’s career".
- ^{P} Players are listed at a position if they appeared in 30% of their games or more during their Phillies career, as defined by Baseball-Reference. Additional positions may be shown on the Baseball-Reference website by following each player's citation.
- ^{R} Franchise batting and pitching leaders are drawn from Baseball-Reference. A total of 1,500 plate appearances are needed to qualify for batting records, and 500 innings pitched or 50 decisions are required to qualify for pitching records.
- ^{S} Statistics are correct as of the end of the 2010 Major League Baseball season.

List

- ^{a} Ron Clark is listed by Baseball-Reference as a third baseman, shortstop, and second baseman, but never appeared in a game in the field for the Phillies.
