= 1910 Pittsburgh Pirates season =

1910 Pittsburgh Pirates
- League: National League
- Ballpark: Forbes Field
- City: Pittsburgh, Pennsylvania (Note: From 1882-1906, the team played in Allegheny, Pennsylvania, which became annexed by Pittsburgh as the North Side in 1907.)
- Owners: Barney Dreyfuss
- Managers: Fred Clarke

The 1910 Pittsburgh (Note: In the early 20th century and earlier, the name of Pittsburgh was spelled both with and without the final 'h'.) Pirates season was the 29th season of the Pittsburgh Pirates franchise; the 24th in the National League. The defending World Series champion Pirates finished third in the National League with a record of 86–67.

== Regular season ==
=== Season standings ===
National League
Team	W	L	Pct.	GB	Home	Road
Chicago Cubs	104	50	.675	—	58‍–‍19	46‍–‍31
New York Giants	91	63	.591	13	52‍–‍26	39‍–‍37
Pittsburgh Pirates	86	67	.562	17½	46‍–‍30	40‍–‍37
Philadelphia Phillies	78	75	.510	25½	40‍–‍36	38‍–‍39
Cincinnati Reds	75	79	.487	29	39‍–‍37	36‍–‍42
Brooklyn Superbas	64	90	.416	40	39‍–‍39	25‍–‍51
St. Louis Cardinals	63	90	.412	40½	35‍–‍41	28‍–‍49
Boston Doves	53	100	.346	50½	29‍–‍48	24‍–‍52

=== Record vs. opponents ===
1910 National League record Sources:
Team	BSN	BRO	CHC	CIN	NYG	PHI	PIT	STL
Boston	—	10–12	5–17	8–14–1	6–16–1	4–17–2	8–14	12–10
Brooklyn	12–10	—	6–16	7–15	8–14	9–13–1	10–12–1	12–10
Chicago	17–5	16–6	—	16–6	14–8	14–8	12–10	15–7
Cincinnati	14–8–1	15–7	6–16	—	8–14	10–12–1	10–12	12–10
New York	16–6–1	14–8	8–14	14–8	—	15–7	12–10	12–10
Philadelphia	17–4–2	13–9–1	8–14	12–10–1	7–15	—	11–11	10–12
Pittsburgh	14–8	12–10–1	10–12	12–10	10–12	11–11	—	17–4
St. Louis	10–12	10–12	7–15	10–12	10–12	12–10	4–17	—

=== Roster ===
1910 Pittsburgh Pirates
Roster
Pitchers: Babe Adams; Howie Camnitz; Kip Dowd; Jack Ferry; Sam Frock; Sam Leever; Lefty Leifield; Nick Maddox; Jack Mercer; Gene Moore; Deacon Phillippe; Bill Powell; Elmer Steele; Lefty Webb; Kirby White	Catchers: George Gibson; Paddy O'Connor; Mike Simon; Infielders: Ed Abbaticchio; Bobby Byrne; John Flynn; Ham Hyatt; Jack Kading; Alex McCarthy; Bill McKechnie; Dots Miller; Bud Sharpe; Honus Wagner	Outfielders: Vin Campbell; Max Carey; Fred Clarke; Tommy Leach; Chief Wilson	Manager: Fred Clarke

== Player stats ==
=== Batting ===
==== Starters by position ====
Note: Pos = Position; G = Games played; AB = At bats; H = Hits; Avg. = Batting average; HR = Home runs; RBI = Runs batted in

Pos	Player	G	AB	H	Avg.	HR	RBI
C	George Gibson	143	482	125	.259	3	44
1B	John Flynn	96	332	91	.274	6	52
2B	Dots Miller	120	444	101	.227	1	48
SS	Honus Wagner	150	556	178	.320	4	81
3B	Bobby Byrne	148	602	178	.296	2	52
OF	Tommy Leach	135	529	143	.270	4	52
OF	Fred Clarke	123	429	113	.263	2	63
OF	Chief Wilson	146	536	148	.276	4	50

==== Other batters ====
Note: G = Games played; AB = At bats; H = Hits; Avg. = Batting average; HR = Home runs; RBI = Runs batted in

Player	G	AB	H	Avg.	HR	RBI
Vin Campbell	97	282	92	.326	4	21
Bill McKechnie	71	212	46	.217	0	12
Ham Hyatt	74	175	46	.263	1	30
Mike Simon	22	50	10	.200	0	5
Jack Kading	8	23	7	.304	0	4
Bud Sharpe	4	16	3	.188	0	1
Alex McCarthy	3	12	1	.083	0	0
Max Carey	2	6	3	.500	0	2
Paddy O'Connor	6	4	1	.250	0	0
Ed Abbaticchio	3	3	0	.000	0	0

=== Pitching ===
==== Starting pitchers ====
Note: G = Games pitched; IP = Innings pitched; W = Wins; L = Losses; ERA = Earned run average; SO = Strikeouts

Player	G	IP	W	L	ERA	SO
Howie Camnitz	38	260.0	12	13	3.22	120
Babe Adams	34	245.0	18	9	2.24	101
Lefty Leifield	40	218.1	15	13	2.64	64
Kirby White	30	153.1	10	9	3.46	42
Bill Powell	12	75.0	4	6	2.40	23
Elmer Steele	3	24.0	0	3	2.25	7

==== Other pitchers ====
Note: G = Games pitched; IP = Innings pitched; W = Wins; L = Losses; ERA = Earned run average; SO = Strikeouts

Player	G	IP	W	L	ERA	SO
Deacon Phillippe	31	121.2	14	2	2.29	30
Sam Leever	26	111.0	6	5	2.76	33
Nick Maddox	20	87.1	2	3	3.40	29
Jack Ferry	6	31.0	1	2	2.32	12
Lefty Webb	7	27.0	2	1	5.67	6
Gene Moore	4	17.1	2	1	3.12	9

==== Relief pitchers ====
Note: G = Games pitched; W = Wins; L = Losses; SV = Saves; ERA = Earned run average; SO = Strikeouts

Player	G	W	L	SV	ERA	SO
Sam Frock	1	0	0	0	4.50	1
Kip Dowd	1	0	0	0	0.00	1
Jack Mercer	1	0	0	0	0.00	1
