= Charles Girard =

Charles Girard may refer to:

- Charles Frédéric Girard (1822–1895), French biologist
- Charles J. Girard (1917–1970), brigadier general in the United States Army
- Charlie Girard (1884–1936), Major League Baseball player
