= 1910 Chicago Cubs season =

1910 Chicago Cubs
- National League champions
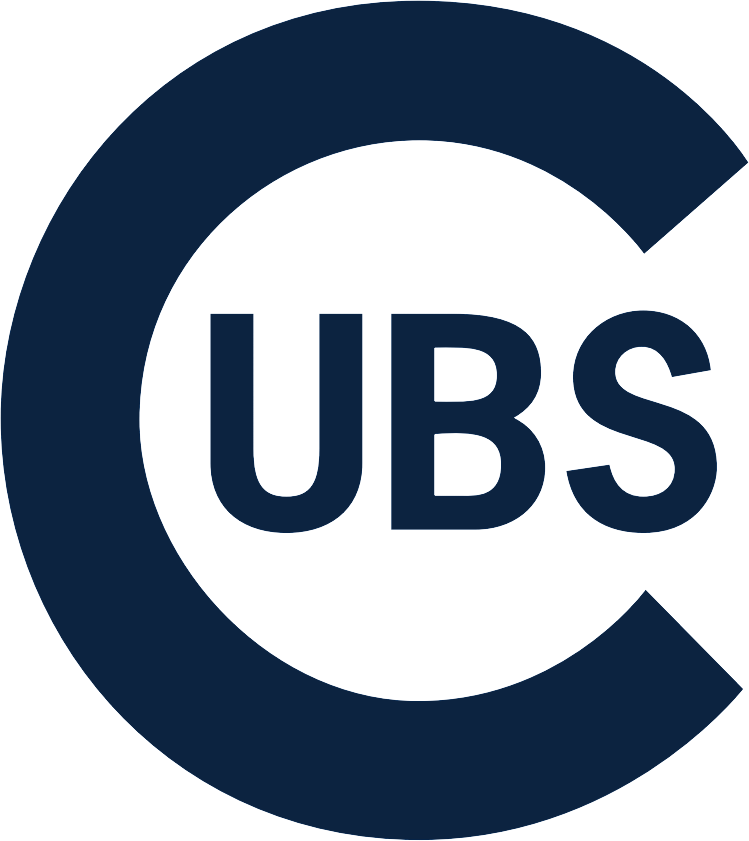
- League: National League
- Ballpark: West Side Park
- City: Chicago
- Record: 104–50 (.675)
- League place: 1st
- Owners: Charles Murphy
- Managers: Frank Chance

The 1910 Chicago Cubs season was the 39th season of the Chicago Cubs franchise, the 35th in the National League and the 18th at West Side Park. The Cubs finished first in the National League with a record of 104–50, 13 games ahead of the second place New York Giants. The team was defeated four games to one by the Philadelphia Athletics in the World Series.

== Regular season ==
=== Season standings ===
National League
Team	W	L	Pct.	GB	Home	Road
Chicago Cubs	104	50	.675	—	58‍–‍19	46‍–‍31
New York Giants	91	63	.591	13	52‍–‍26	39‍–‍37
Pittsburgh Pirates	86	67	.562	17½	46‍–‍30	40‍–‍37
Philadelphia Phillies	78	75	.510	25½	40‍–‍36	38‍–‍39
Cincinnati Reds	75	79	.487	29	39‍–‍37	36‍–‍42
Brooklyn Superbas	64	90	.416	40	39‍–‍39	25‍–‍51
St. Louis Cardinals	63	90	.412	40½	35‍–‍41	28‍–‍49
Boston Doves	53	100	.346	50½	29‍–‍48	24‍–‍52

=== Record vs. opponents ===
1910 National League record Sources:
Team	BSN	BRO	CHC	CIN	NYG	PHI	PIT	STL
Boston	—	10–12	5–17	8–14–1	6–16–1	4–17–2	8–14	12–10
Brooklyn	12–10	—	6–16	7–15	8–14	9–13–1	10–12–1	12–10
Chicago	17–5	16–6	—	16–6	14–8	14–8	12–10	15–7
Cincinnati	14–8–1	15–7	6–16	—	8–14	10–12–1	10–12	12–10
New York	16–6–1	14–8	8–14	14–8	—	15–7	12–10	12–10
Philadelphia	17–4–2	13–9–1	8–14	12–10–1	7–15	—	11–11	10–12
Pittsburgh	14–8	12–10–1	10–12	12–10	10–12	11–11	—	17–4
St. Louis	10–12	10–12	7–15	10–12	10–12	12–10	4–17	—

=== Notable transactions ===
- May 13, 1910: Doc Miller was traded by the Cubs to the Boston Doves for Lew Richie.

=== Roster ===
1910 Chicago Cubs
Roster
Pitchers: Mordecai Brown; Al Carson; King Cole; Bill Foxen; Rube Kroh; Harry McIntire; Orval Overall; Big Jeff Pfeffer; Jack Pfiester; Ed Reulbach; Lew Richie; Orlie Weaver	Catchers: Jimmy Archer; Johnny Kling; Tom Needham; Infielders: Frank Chance; Johnny Evers; Fred Luderus; Harry Steinfeldt; Joe Tinker; Heinie Zimmerman	Outfielders: Ginger Beaumont; Solly Hofman; John Kane; Wildfire Schulte; Jimmy Sheckard; Other batters: Doc Miller	Manager: Frank Chance

== Player stats ==
=== Batting ===
==== Starters by position ====
Note: Pos = Position; G = Games played; AB = At bats; H = Hits; Avg. = Batting average; HR = Home runs; RBI = Runs batted in

Pos	Player	G	AB	H	Avg.	HR	RBI
C	Johnny Kling	91	297	80	.269	2	32
1B	Frank Chance	88	295	88	.298	0	36
2B	Johnny Evers	125	433	114	.263	0	28
SS	Joe Tinker	134	473	136	.288	3	69
3B	Harry Steinfeldt	129	448	113	.252	2	58
OF	Jimmy Sheckard	144	507	130	.256	5	51
OF	Solly Hofman	136	477	155	.325	3	86
OF	Frank Schulte	151	559	168	.301	10	68

==== Other batters ====
Note: G = Games played; AB = At bats; H = Hits; Avg. = Batting average; HR = Home runs; RBI = Runs batted in

Player	G	AB	H	Avg.	HR	RBI
Heinie Zimmerman	99	335	95	.284	3	38
Jimmy Archer	98	313	81	.259	2	4
Ginger Beaumont	76	172	46	.267	2	22
Tom Needham	31	76	14	.184	0	10
John Kane	32	62	15	.242	1	12
Fred Luderus	24	54	11	.204	0	3
Doc Miller	1	1	0	.000	0	0

=== Pitching ===
==== Starting pitchers ====
Note: G = Games pitched; IP = Innings pitched; W = Wins; L = Losses; ERA = Earned run average; SO = Strikeouts

Player	G	IP	W	L	ERA	SO
Mordecai Brown	46	295.1	25	14	1.86	143
King Cole	33	239.2	20	4	1.80	114
Harry McIntire	28	176.0	13	9	3.07	65
Ed Reulbach	24	173.1	12	8	3.12	55
Orval Overall	23	144.2	12	6	2.68	92
Jack Pfiester	14	100.1	6	3	1.79	34

==== Other pitchers ====
Note: G = Games pitched; IP = Innings pitched; W = Wins; L = Losses; ERA = Earned run average; SO = Strikeouts

Player	G	IP	W	L	ERA	SO
Lew Richie	30	130.0	11	4	2.70	53
Rube Kroh	6	34.1	3	1	4.46	16

==== Relief pitchers ====
Note: G = Games pitched; W = Wins; L = Losses; SV = Saves; ERA = Earned run average; SO = Strikeouts

Player	G	W	L	SV	ERA	SO
Big Jeff Pfeffer	13	1	0	0	3.27	11
Orlie Weaver	7	1	1	0	3.66	22
Al Carson	2	0	0	0	4.05	2
Bill Foxen	2	0	0	0	9.00	2

== 1910 World Series ==
AL Philadelphia Athletics (4) vs. NL Chicago Cubs (1)

Game	Score	Date	Location	Attendance
1	Cubs – 1, Athletics – 4	October 17	Shibe Park	26,891
2	Cubs – 3, Athletics – 9	October 18	Shibe Park	24,597
3	Athletics – 12, Cubs – 5	October 20	West Side Park	26,210
4	Athletics – 3, Cubs – 4 (10 innings)	October 22	West Side Park	19,150
5	Athletics – 7, Cubs – 2	October 23	West Side Park	27,374
