= Kip Dowd =

American baseball player (1889–1960)

- Pitcher
- Born: February 16, 1889; Holyoke, Massachusetts, U.S.
- Died: December 20, 1960 (aged 71); Holyoke, Massachusetts, U.S.
- Batted: Right Threw: Right

MLB debut
- July 5, 1910, for the Pittsburgh Pirates

Last MLB appearance
- July 5, 1910, for the Pittsburgh Pirates

MLB statistics
- Win–loss record: 0–0
- Earned run average: 0.00
- Strikeouts: 1
- Stats at Baseball Reference

Teams
- Pittsburgh Pirates (1910)

James Joseph Dowd (February 16, 1889 – December 20, 1960) was an American Major League Baseball pitcher who played for the 1910 Pittsburgh Pirates in one game on July 5, 1910. He pitched two innings and gave up four runs, all unearned. He attended the College of the Holy Cross and played in the minor leagues from 1911 to 1915. He was the grandfather of actress Ann Dowd.
