= Vin Campbell =

American baseball player (1888–1969)

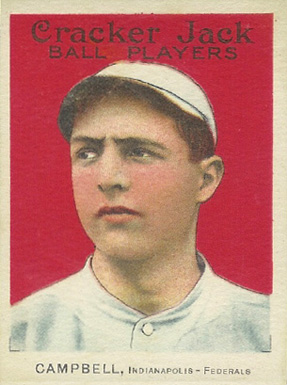
- Outfielder
- Born: January 30, 1888; St. Louis, Missouri, U.S.
- Died: November 16, 1969 (aged 81); Towson, Maryland, U.S.
- Batted: Left Threw: Right

MLB debut
- June 6, 1908, for the Chicago Cubs

Last MLB appearance
- September 27, 1915, for the Newark Peppers

MLB statistics
- Batting average: .310
- Home runs: 15
- Runs batted in: 171
- Stats at Baseball Reference

Teams
- Chicago Cubs (1908); Pittsburgh Pirates (1910–1911); Boston Braves (1912); Indianapolis Hoosiers (1914); Newark Peppers (1915)

Arthur Vincent "Demon" Campbell (January 30, 1888 – November 16, 1969) was an American Major League Baseball outfielder. He played all or part of six seasons in the major leagues between 1908 and 1915. He played for the Boston Braves, Chicago Cubs, Pittsburgh Pirates, Indianapolis Hoosiers, and Newark Peppers.

In 546 games, Campbell batted .310 (642-2069) with 326 runs scored, 15 home runs, 171 RBI, 92 stolen bases, an on-base percentage of .357 and a slugging percentage of .408.

== Early life ==
Campbell, whose father was a St. Louis physician, attended Smith Academy and Vanderbilt University, where he played both football and baseball. As a member of Dan McGugin's Vanderbilt Commodores football team, Campbell was a halfback, and he was selected for John Heisman's College Football All-Southern Team in 1907. In 1915, Heisman selected Campbell for his 30 greatest Southern football players.

== Baseball career ==
As an educated man from a wealthy family, Campbell was rare among baseball players of his era, and he was frequently torn between his baseball career and opportunities in the business world. He joined the Chicago Cubs in 1908, but he played only one game that year, and the sportswriters in that city made fun of him for wearing fancy clothes. He made it back to the major leagues with the 1910 Pittsburgh Pirates, hitting .326 in 97 games. He could not agree on contract terms with Pittsburgh for the next season, and he secured a job with a brokerage firm. He returned to the Pirates in July 1911.

In his most complete season, Campbell played in 145 games with the 1912 Boston Braves, leading the league in at bats (624), hitting .296 and stealing 19 bases. He led the league's center fielders with 144 games at that position. Campbell left baseball again after that season, becoming the St. Louis sales agent for an auto parts company. He married Katherine Munhall, who came from a well-to-do family in Pittsburgh.

He entered the Federal League with the 1914 Indianapolis Hoosiers. He remained with the team in 1915, when they were known as the Newark Peppers. Campbell had a contract for the next year, but the Federal League shut down. Campbell sued league executives for his lost pay and was awarded nearly $6,000.

Campbell hit for a good batting average and had good speed, but his defensive ability was limited. In an era in which gloves were much smaller, Campbell's small hands created a disadvantage in the field.

== Later life ==
Campbell left baseball after the 1915 season. He died in 1969 in Towson, Maryland.
