= Jack Mercer (baseball) =

American baseball player (1889–1945)

- Pitcher
- Born: March 10, 1889; Zanesville, Ohio, U.S.
- Died: June 25, 1945 (aged 56); Dayton, Ohio, U.S.
- Batted: Unknown Threw: Right

MLB debut
- August 2, 1910, for the Pittsburgh Pirates

Last MLB appearance
- August 2, 1910, for the Pittsburgh Pirates

MLB statistics
- Win–loss record: 0–0
- Earned run average: 0.00
- Strikeouts: 1
- Stats at Baseball Reference

Teams
- Pittsburgh Pirates (1910)

Harry Vernon Mercer (March 10, 1889 – June 25, 1945), known professionally as Jack Mercer, was an American Major League Baseball pitcher who played for the 1910 Pittsburgh Pirates in one game on August 2, 1910. Prior to his brief appearance with the Pirates, he played from 1907 to 1910 in the minor leagues.
