= Lou Schettler =

American baseball player (1886-1960)

- Pitcher
- Born: June 12, 1886; Pittsburgh, Pennsylvania, U.S.
- Died: May 1, 1960 (aged 73); Youngstown, Ohio, U.S.
- Batted: Right Threw: Right

MLB debut
- April 25, 1910, for the Philadelphia Phillies

Last MLB appearance
- October 1, 1910, for the Philadelphia Phillies

MLB statistics
- Win–loss record: 2–6
- Earned run average: 3.20
- Strikeouts: 62
- Stats at Baseball Reference

Teams
- Philadelphia Phillies (1910)

Louis Martin Schettler (June 12, 1886 – May 1, 1960) was an American pitcher in Major League Baseball. He pitched for the 1910 Philadelphia Phillies.
