= Ed Hendricks =

American baseball player (1885-1930)

- Pitcher
- Born: June 20, 1885; Zeeland, Michigan
- Died: November 28, 1930 (aged 45); Jackson, Michigan
- Batted: Left Threw: Left

MLB debut
- September 15, 1910, for the New York Giants

Last MLB appearance
- October 11, 1910, for the New York Giants

MLB statistics
- Win–loss record: 0–1
- Earned run average: 3.75
- Strikeouts: 2
- Stats at Baseball Reference

Teams
- New York Giants (1910)

Edward Hendricks (June 20, 1885 – November 28, 1930) was a pitcher in Major League Baseball. He played for the New York Giants in 1910.
