= Fred Miller (baseball) =

American baseball player (1886–1953)

- Pitcher
- Born: June 28, 1886; Fairfield, Indiana, U.S.
- Died: May 2, 1953 (aged 66); Brookville, Indiana, U.S.
- Batted: Left Threw: Left

MLB debut
- July 8, 1910, for the Brooklyn Superbas

Last MLB appearance
- August 15, 1910, for the Brooklyn Superbas

MLB statistics
- Win–loss record: 1–1
- Earned run average: 4.71
- Strikeouts: 2
- Stats at Baseball Reference

Teams
- Brooklyn Superbas (1910)

Frederick Holman Miller (June 28, 1886 – May 2, 1953), nicknamed "Speedy", was an American pitcher in Major League Baseball. He pitched in six games for the 1910 Brooklyn Superbas.
