= Joe Burg =

American baseball player (1882–1969)

- Third baseman
- Born: June 4, 1882; Chicago, Illinois, U.S.
- Died: April 28, 1969 (aged 86); Joliet, Illinois, U.S.
- Batted: Right Threw: Right

MLB debut
- September 26, 1910, for the Boston Doves

Last MLB appearance
- October 12, 1910, for the Boston Doves

MLB statistics
- Batting average: .326
- Home runs: 0
- Runs batted in: 10
- Stats at Baseball Reference

Teams
- Boston Doves (1910)

Joseph Peter Burg (June 4, 1882 – April 28, 1969) was an American third baseman in Major League Baseball. He played 13 games for the Boston Doves in 1910. Despite being above average in on-base percentage, Joseph Burg wouldn't play in Major League Baseball for the rest of his career.

After Burg's brief career in Major League Baseball, he played six more seasons in Minor League Baseball, until age thirty-four. He played Single A, Double-A, and in the New York State League. No complete record's of Burg's statistics from the New York State League's are available.
