= Fred Liese =

American baseball player (1885-1967)

- Pinch hitter, Outfielder
- Born: October 7, 1885; Berlin, Green Lake County, Wisconsin, U.S.
- Died: June 30, 1967 (aged 81); Los Angeles, California, U.S.
- Batted: Left Threw: Left

MLB debut
- April 14, 1910, for the Boston Doves

Last MLB appearance
- April 26, 1910, for the Boston Doves

MLB statistics
- Games played: 5
- At bats: 4
- Hits: 0
- Stats at Baseball Reference

Teams
- Boston Doves (1910)

Frederick Richard Liese (October 7, 1885 – June 30, 1967) was an American pinch hitter in Major League Baseball. He played for the Boston Doves in 1910. He played High School Baseball for the Berlin High School Club, Evans Colts, nicknamed the "Berlin Youngsters" and attended the University of Wisconsin. He was an outfielder during his time in the minor leagues.

== Career ==
Liese went pro after two seasons of college baseball and signed with the Madison Senators of the Wisconsin–Illinois League in 1907. In 195 games in two seasons with the team Liese batted a .276 at bat. Liese was then drafted by the Chicago Cubs in 1909. But on March 27, 1909, Liese was traded by the Chicago Cubs to the St. Paul Saints of the American Association for Tom Needham. That year Liese would go on to bat .254 in 120 games, in his worst season as a minor league player. Liese would be redrafted by the Cubs on September 1, 1909 St. Paul in the 1909 rule 5 draft. Liese would not suit up for a single game for the Cubs and on February 1, 1910, he would be traded by the Chicago Cubs with cash to the Boston Doves for Ginger Beaumont. Liese would bat a .000 while appearing on plate five times. He was later purchased by St. Paul and returned to the Saints for the rest of the 1910 season. Liese would not play baseball again until his final season in 1913, which he spent with the Salina Insurgents of the Kansas State League.
