= Billy Burke (baseball) =

American baseball player (1889–1967)

- Pitcher
- Born: July 11, 1889; Clinton, Massachusetts, U.S.
- Died: February 9, 1967 (aged 77); Worcester, Massachusetts, U.S.
- Batted: Left Threw: Left

MLB debut
- April 30, 1910, for the Boston Doves

Last MLB appearance
- September 26, 1911, for the Boston Rustlers

MLB statistics
- Win–loss record: 1–1
- Earned run average: 4.81
- Strikeouts: 23
- Stats at Baseball Reference

Teams
- Boston Doves / Rustlers (1910–1911)

William Ignatius Burke (July 11, 1889 – February 9, 1967) is an American former Major League Baseball pitcher. He played two seasons with the Boston Doves / Rustlers from 1910 to 1911.
