= Tony Smith (baseball) =

American baseball player

- Shortstop
- Born: May 14, 1884; Chicago, Illinois, U.S.
- Died: February 27, 1964 (aged 79); Galveston, Texas, U.S.
- Batted: Right Threw: Right

MLB debut
- August 12, 1907, for the Washington Senators

Last MLB appearance
- July 11, 1911, for the Brooklyn Dodgers

MLB statistics
- Batting average: .180
- Home runs: 1
- Runs batted in: 26
- Stats at Baseball Reference

Teams
- Washington Senators (1907); Brooklyn Superbas/Dodgers (1910–1911)

Anthony Smith (May 14, 1884 – February 27, 1964) was an American professional baseball shortstop. He played in Major League Baseball from 1907 through 1911 for the Washington Senators and Brooklyn Superbas / Dodgers.
