= Orlie Weaver =

American baseball player (1886–1970)

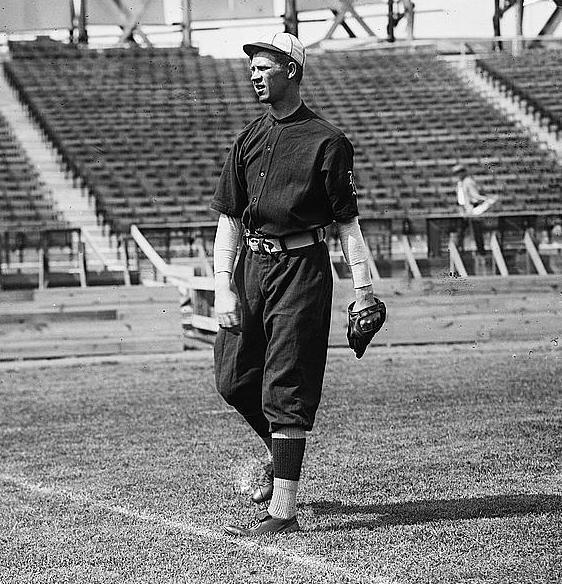
- Weaver in 1911
- Pitcher
- Born: June 4, 1886; Newport, Tennessee, U.S.
- Died: November 28, 1970 (aged 84); New Orleans, Louisiana, U.S.
- Batted: Right Threw: Right

MLB debut
- September 14, 1910, for the Chicago Cubs

Last MLB appearance
- October 9, 1911, for the Boston Rustlers

MLB statistics
- Win–loss record: 6–15
- Earned run average: 5.03
- Strikeouts: 92
- Stats at Baseball Reference

Teams
- Chicago Cubs (1910–1911); Boston Rustlers (1911)

Orville Forest Weaver (June 4, 1886 – November 28, 1970) was an American professional baseball player who played pitcher in the Major Leagues from 1910–1911 for the Chicago Cubs and Boston Rustlers. He was born in Newport, Tennessee, on June 4, 1887. He died in New Orleans, Louisiana on November 28, 1970.
