= Bill Davidson (baseball) =

American baseball player (1884–1954)

- Outfielder
- Born: May 10, 1884; Lafayette, Indiana, U.S.
- Died: May 23, 1954 (aged 70); Lincoln, Nebraska, U.S.
- Batted: Right Threw: Right

MLB debut
- September 29, 1909, for the Chicago Cubs

Last MLB appearance
- September 8, 1911, for the Brooklyn Dodgers

MLB statistics
- Batting average: .235
- Home runs: 1
- Runs batted in: 60
- Stats at Baseball Reference

Teams
- Chicago Cubs (1909); Brooklyn Superbas/Dodgers (1910–1911)

William Simpson Davidson (May 10, 1884 – May 23, 1954) was an American outfielder in Major League Baseball from 1909 to 1911.

== Sources ==
- Career statistics from Baseball Reference · Baseball Reference (Minors) · Retrosheet · Baseball Almanac
