= George Crable =

American baseball player (1885-1965)

- Pitcher
- Born: January 9, 1885; Kearney, Nebraska, U.S.
- Died: August 8, 1965 (aged 80); Lake Worth, Florida, U.S.
- Batted: Left Threw: Left

MLB debut
- August 3, 1910, for the Brooklyn Superbas

Last MLB appearance
- August 20, 1910, for the Brooklyn Superbas

MLB statistics
- Win–loss record: 0–0
- Earned run average: 4.91
- Strikeouts: 3
- Stats at Baseball Reference

Teams
- Brooklyn Superbas (1910)

George Elmer Crable (January 9, 1885 – August 8, 1965) was an American pitcher in Major League Baseball. He pitched in two games for the 1910 Brooklyn Superbas.

Crable played in the minor leagues from 1908 to 1918, compiling a career record of 83–104.
