= Happy Smith =

American baseball player (1883-1961)

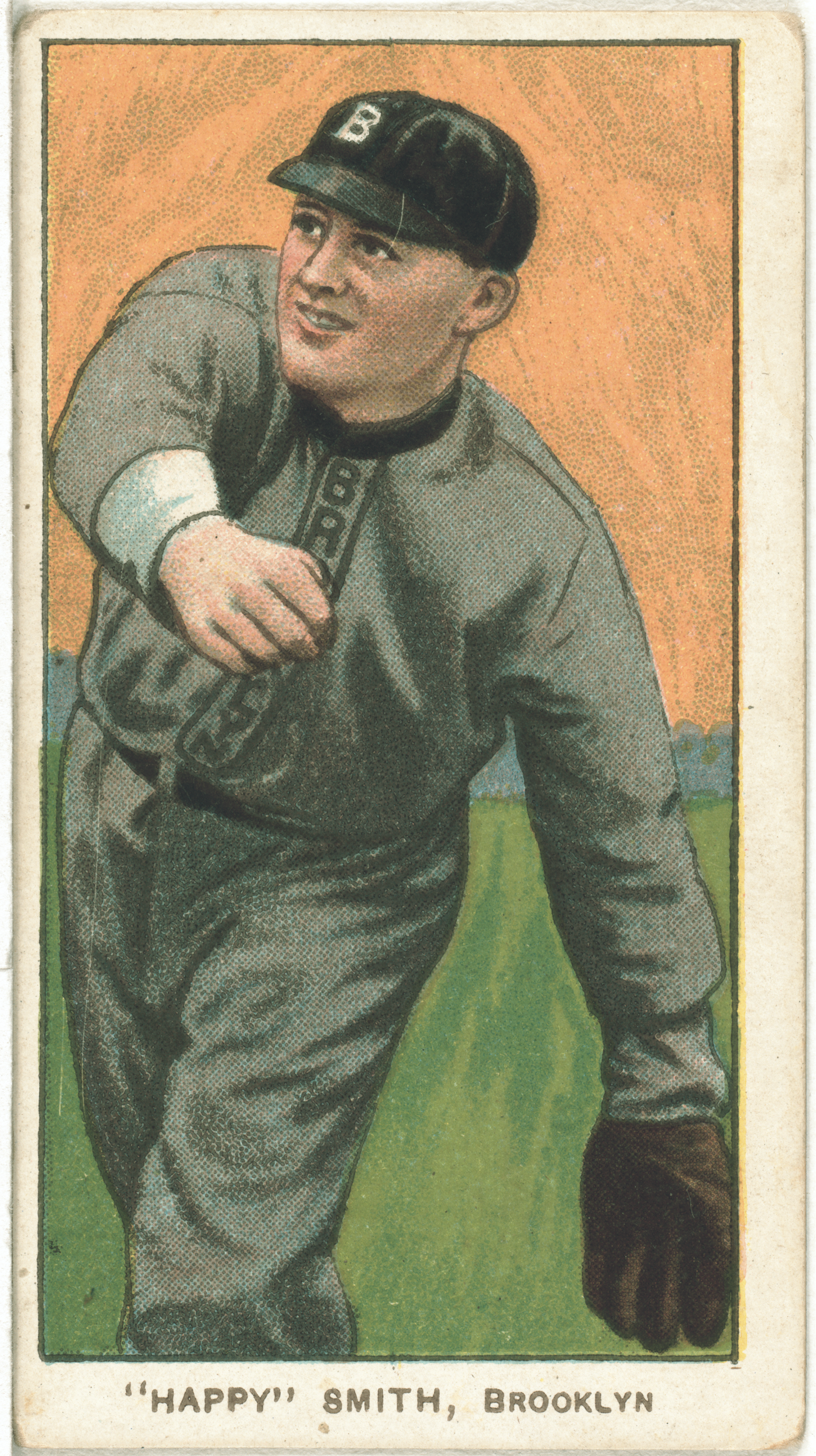
- Outfielder
- Born: July 14, 1883; Coquille, Oregon, U.S.
- Died: February 26, 1961 (aged 77); San Jose, California, U.S.
- Batted: Left Threw: Right

MLB debut
- April 15, 1910, for the Brooklyn Superbas

Last MLB appearance
- July 22, 1910, for the Brooklyn Superbas

MLB statistics
- Batting average: .237
- Home runs: 0
- Runs batted in: 5
- Stats at Baseball Reference

Teams
- Brooklyn Superbas (1910)

Henry Joseph Smith (July 14, 1883 – February 26, 1961) was an American Major League Baseball outfielder.

Smith was born in Coquille, Oregon. He played one season for the Brooklyn Superbas in 1910. He died in San Jose, California.
