= Ralph Good =

American baseball player (1886-1965)

- Pitcher
- Born: April 25, 1886; Monticello, Maine
- Died: November 24, 1965 (aged 79); Waterville, Maine
- Batted: Right Threw: Right

MLB debut
- July 1, 1910, for the Boston Doves

Last MLB appearance
- July 24, 1910, for the Boston Doves

MLB statistics
- Win–loss record: 0–0
- Strikeouts: 4
- Earned run average: 2.00
- Stats at Baseball Reference

Teams
- Boston Doves (1910)

Ralph Nelson Good (April 25, 1886 – November 24, 1965), nicknamed "Holy", was an American professional baseball player with the Boston Doves in 1910. A pitcher, he appeared in two games without a decision.

== Athletic career ==
Good played football, baseball, and basketball at the Ricker Classical Institute. He entered Colby College in 1906, where, in addition to being a star pitcher, Good was captain of the football team and a member of the indoor and outdoor track teams. Good was appointed director of physical training at the Coburn Classical Institute in March 1910 and would begin working there that September.

Good signed with the Boston Doves in June 1910 and reported to the team on June 25. He made his debut on July 1, pitching eight innings in relief in a 6–2 loss to the Philadelphia Phillies. He pitched only once more that season, pitching one inning in Boston's 5–3 loss to the Chicago Cubs on July 24. He resigned with the club on February 23, 1911. On April 9, The Boston Globe reported that Good had not made team and was expected to sign with a minor league club. However, Good returned to the Coburn Institute to coach the school's baseball team.

== Post-baseball career ==
Due to his success at Coburn, Good was named head football coach at his alma mater, Colby College, in March 1912. However, the following month, he took a teaching and coaching position at Malden High School in Malden, Massachusetts. In 1915, he took a similar position at Amesbury High School in Amesbury, Massachusetts. He resigned after one year to accept a job at the Gray & Davis factory. He later accepted an executive position with the Merrimac Hat Company. He returned to Gray & Davis in 1919 as a superintendent.

Good was elected to the Amesbury school committee in 1917 and remained a member until December 30, 1921, when he resigned to become a factory manager in Portland, Maine. He was a well-known football official in Maine, refereeing college and high school games. From 1940 to 1961, Good worked at the General Ice Cream Corporation factory in Waterville, Maine. Good died on November 24, 1965 in Waterville.
