= Barney Slaughter =

American baseball player (1884-1961)

- Pitcher
- Born: October 6, 1884; Smyrna, Delaware, U.S.
- Died: May 17, 1961 (aged 76); Philadelphia, Pennsylvania, U.S.
- Batted: Right Threw: Right

MLB debut
- August 9, 1910, for the Philadelphia Phillies

Last MLB appearance
- October 11, 1910, for the Philadelphia Phillies

MLB statistics
- Win–loss record: 0–1
- Earned run average: 5.50
- Strikeouts: 7
- Stats at Baseball Reference

Teams
- Philadelphia Phillies (1910)

Byron Atkins "Barney" Slaughter (October 6, 1884 – May 17, 1961) was an American pitcher in Major League Baseball. He pitched 8 games for the Philadelphia Phillies in 1910. He recorded one loss and one save in his career, mostly as a relief pitcher. He also started one game. In 1911 Slaughter pitched for Scranton in the New York State League, and subsequently for Louisville in the American Association, Sioux City in the Western League, and Erie in the Central League, before retiring from organized baseball in 1913.

After leaving baseball, he was employed by the Pennsylvania Railroad Company, working in the secretary's office for more than 35 years before retiring at the age of 65.

On May 17, 1961, Barney Slaughter died in Philadelphia, at the age of 76 and was interred at Glenwood Memorial Gardens in Broomall, Pennsylvania.
