= Louis Drucke =

American baseball player (1888-1955)

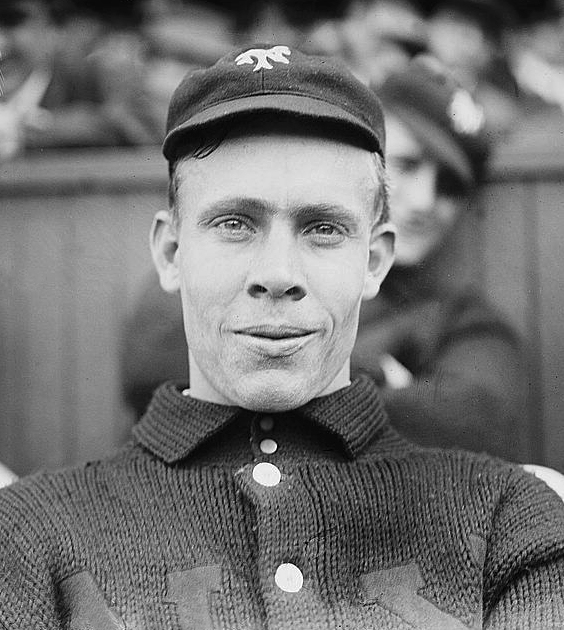
- Drucke in 1912
- Pitcher
- Born: December 3, 1888; Waco, Texas, U.S.
- Died: September 25, 1955 (aged 66); Waco, Texas, U.S.
- Batted: Right Threw: Right

MLB debut
- September 25, 1909, for the New York Giants

Last MLB appearance
- May 1, 1912, for the New York Giants

MLB statistics
- Win–loss record: 18–15
- Earned run average: 2.90
- Strikeouts: 201
- Stats at Baseball Reference

Teams
- New York Giants (1909–1912)

Louis Frank Drucke (December 3, 1888 – September 25, 1955) was an American professional baseball pitcher. He played all or part of four seasons in Major League Baseball with the New York Giants from 1909 to 1912. As a pitcher, he won 18 while losing 15 games, with a 2.90 earned run average. As a batter, he hit .178 with one home run.

In October 1910, Drucke was riding the New York City Subway when it derailed at the Fulton Street station, resulting in injuries to his shoulder. Drucke sued the Interborough Rapid Transit Company (IRT) for the injury, seeking $25,000 in damages (equivalent to $864,000 in 2025). The IRT had subpoenaed fourteen members of the Giants to testify at trial but the matter was settled in April 1912, with Drucke accepting a payment of $5,000 (equivalent to $167,000 in 2025).

Drucke was the first major leaguer who attended and played at Texas Christian University (TCU).
