= Rube Sellers =

American baseball player (1881–1952)

- Outfielder
- Born: March 7, 1881; Duquesne, Pennsylvania, U.S.
- Died: January 14, 1952 (aged 70); Pittsburgh, Pennsylvania, U.S.
- Batted: Right Threw: Right

MLB debut
- August 12, 1910, for the Boston Doves

Last MLB appearance
- October 4, 1910, for the Boston Doves

MLB statistics
- Batting average: .156
- Home runs: 0
- Runs batted in: 2
- Stats at Baseball Reference

Teams
- Boston Doves (1910)

Oliver "Rube" Sellers (March 7, 1881 – January 14, 1952) was an American outfielder in Major League Baseball. He played for the Boston Doves in 1910.
