= Alex McCarthy (baseball) =

American baseball player (1889–1978)

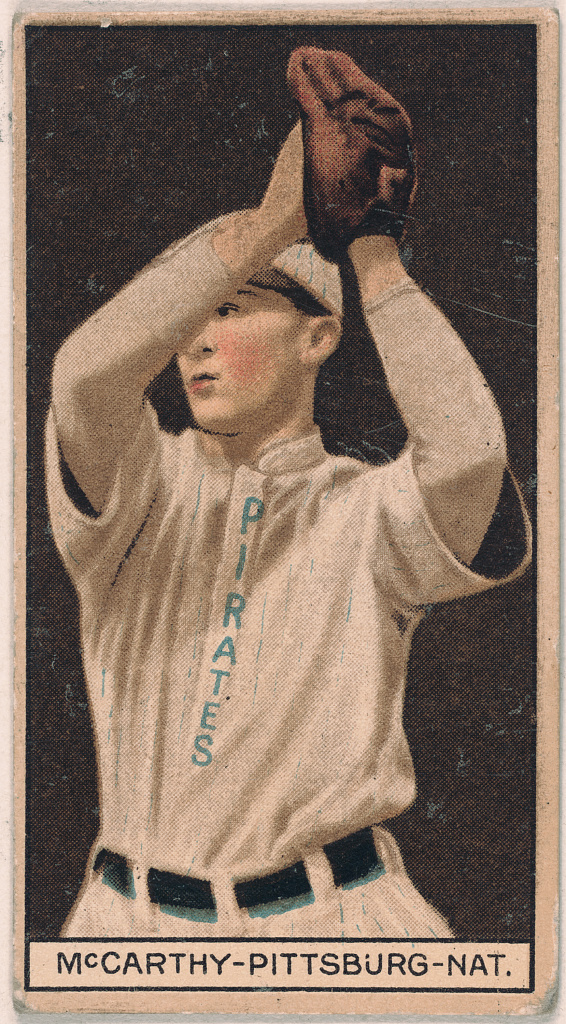
- Alex McCarthy
- Infielder
- Born: May 12, 1889; Chicago, Illinois, U.S.
- Died: March 12, 1978 (aged 88); Salisbury, Maryland, U.S.
- Batted: Right Threw: Right

MLB debut
- October 7, 1910, for the Pittsburgh Pirates

Last MLB appearance
- July 23, 1917, for the Pittsburgh Pirates

MLB statistics
- Batting average: .229
- Home runs: 5
- Runs batted in: 122
- Stats at Baseball Reference

Teams
- Pittsburgh Pirates (1910–1915); Chicago Cubs (1915–1916); Pittsburgh Pirates (1916–1917)

Alexander George McCarthy (May 12, 1889 – March 12, 1978) was an American professional baseball infielder. He played all or part of eight seasons in Major League Baseball from 1910 to 1917. He played over 100 games each as a second baseman, shortstop and third baseman.

== Professional baseball career ==
In 1910, McCarthy was purchased by the Pittsburgh Pirates from the South Bend Bronchos of the Central League. He played with the Pirates until 1915, when he was purchased by the Chicago Cubs. The following year, he returned to Pittsburgh when the Pirates purchased him from the Cubs.

In 1918, McCarthy was traded to the Kansas City Blues of the American Association to complete a deal that included Fritz Mollwitz. McCarthy continued to play in the minor leagues until 1927. He served as player-manager of the Blues in 1920, and of the Springfield Senators of the Illinois–Indiana–Iowa League in 1926-27.

== Personal life ==
He attended the University of Notre Dame, but did not play baseball at the collegiate level.
