= Frank Schneiberg =

American baseball player (1880-1948)

- Pitcher
- Born: March 12, 1880; Milwaukee, Wisconsin
- Died: May 18, 1948 (aged 68); Milwaukee, Wisconsin
- Batted: Unknown Threw: Right

MLB debut
- June 8, 1910, for the Brooklyn Superbas

Last MLB appearance
- June 8, 1910, for the Brooklyn Superbas

MLB statistics
- Win–loss record: 0–0
- Earned run average: 63.00
- Strikeouts: 0
- Stats at Baseball Reference

Teams
- Brooklyn Superbas (1910)

Frank Fred Schneiberg (March 12, 1880 – May 19, 1948) was a pitcher in Major League Baseball. He pitched in one game for the 1910 Brooklyn Superbas. He worked one inning in a game on June 8, 1910, and gave up five hits, four walks and seven earned runs.

Schneiberg was the youngest of nine children born to Johann Schneiberg and Katerina Karabova, immigrants from German-speaking Bohemia.
