= Bill Culp =

American baseball player (1887-1969)

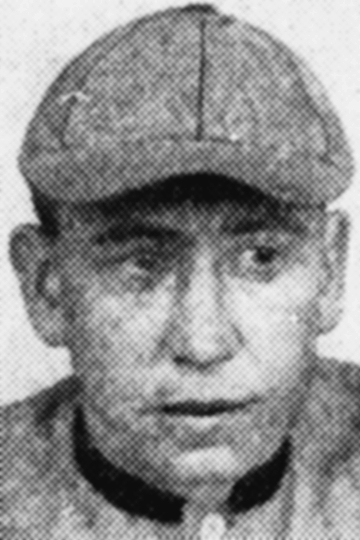
- Pitcher
- Born: June 11, 1887; Bellaire, Ohio, U.S.
- Died: September 3, 1969 (aged 82); Arnold, Pennsylvania, U.S.
- Batted: Both Threw: Right

MLB debut
- September 8, 1910, for the Philadelphia Phillies

Last MLB appearance
- October 11, 1910, for the Philadelphia Phillies

MLB statistics
- Games pitched: 4
- Earned run average: 8.10
- Strikeouts: 4
- Stats at Baseball Reference

Teams
- Philadelphia Phillies (1910)

William Edward Culp (June 11, 1887 – September 3, 1969) was an American professional baseball pitcher. Culp played for the Philadelphia Phillies of Major League Baseball in 1910. In 4 career games, he had a 0–0 record with an 8.10 ERA. He batted right and left and threw right-handed.

Culp was born in Bellaire, Ohio and died in Arnold, Pennsylvania.
