= Charlie Girard =

American baseball player (1884–1936)

- Pitcher
- Born: December 16, 1884; Brooklyn, New York, U.S.
- Died: August 6, 1936 (aged 51); Brooklyn, New York, U.S.
- Batted: Right Threw: Right

MLB debut
- September 14, 1910, for the Philadelphia Phillies

Last MLB appearance
- October 11, 1910, for the Philadelphia Phillies

MLB statistics
- Win–loss record: 1-2
- Earned run average: 6.41
- Strikeouts: 11
- Stats at Baseball Reference

Teams
- Philadelphia Phillies (1910)

Charles August Girard (December 16, 1884 – August 6, 1936) was an American pitcher in Major League Baseball. He played for the Philadelphia Phillies in 1910.
