= 1912 Boston Braves season =

1912 Boston Braves
- League: National League
- Ballpark: South End Grounds
- City: Boston, Massachusetts
- Record: 52–101 (.340)
- League place: 8th
- Owners: James Gaffney, John Montgomery Ward
- Managers: Johnny Kling

The 1912 Boston Braves season was the 42nd season of the franchise. Team owner William Hepburn Russell died after the 1911 season and his stock was bought up by a group including Tammany Hall alderman James Gaffney and former baseball manager John Montgomery Ward. The team was renamed the Boston Braves after the Sachems, also known as "Braves", of Tammany Hall.

== Regular season ==
=== Season standings ===
National League
Team	W	L	Pct.	GB	Home	Road
New York Giants	103	48	.682	—	49‍–‍25	54‍–‍23
Pittsburgh Pirates	93	58	.616	10	44‍–‍31	49‍–‍27
Chicago Cubs	91	59	.607	11½	46‍–‍30	45‍–‍29
Cincinnati Reds	75	78	.490	29	45‍–‍32	30‍–‍46
Philadelphia Phillies	73	79	.480	30½	34‍–‍41	39‍–‍38
St. Louis Cardinals	63	90	.412	41	37‍–‍40	26‍–‍50
Brooklyn Trolley Dodgers	58	95	.379	46	33‍–‍43	25‍–‍52
Boston Braves	52	101	.340	52	31‍–‍47	21‍–‍54

=== Record vs. opponents ===
1912 National League record Sources:
Team	BSN	BRO	CHC	CIN	NYG	PHI	PIT	STL
Boston	—	9–13	5–17	11–11	3–18–1	10–12	4–18–1	10–12
Brooklyn	13–9	—	5–17	6–16	6–16	9–13	8–14	11–10
Chicago	17–5	17–5	—	11–10–1	13–9–1	10–10	8–13	15–7
Cincinnati	11–11	16–6	10–11–1	—	6–16–1	8–14	11–11	13–9
New York	18–3–1	16–6	9–13–1	16–6–1	—	17–5	12–8	15–7
Philadelphia	12–10	13–9	10–10	14–8	5–17	—	8–14	11–11
Pittsburgh	18–4–1	14–8	13–8	11–11	8–12	14–8	—	15–7
St. Louis	12–10	10–11	7–15	9–13	7–15	11–11	7–15	—

=== Notable transactions ===
- June 21, 1912: Doc Miller was traded by the Braves to the Philadelphia Phillies for John Titus.

=== Roster ===
1912 Boston Braves
Roster
Pitchers: Bill Brady; King Brady; Buster Brown; Walt Dickson; Ed Donnelly; Hank Griffin; Otto Hess; Brad Hogg; Rube Kroh; Al Mattern; Bill McTigue; Hub Perdue; Lefty Tyler; Steve White	Catchers: Mike González; Hank Gowdy; Johnny Kling; Bill Rariden; Gil Whitehouse; Infielders: Al Bridwell; Art Devlin; Ben Houser; Rabbit Maranville; Ed McDonald; Frank O'Rourke; Joe Schultz; Art Schwind; Dave Shean; Harry Spratt; Bill Sweeney	Outfielders: Vin Campbell; George Jackson; Al Kaiser; Jay Kirke; Doc Miller; John Titus; Other batters: Bill Jones	Manager: Johnny Kling

== Player stats ==
=== Batting ===
==== Starters by position ====
Note: Pos = Position; G = Games played; AB = At bats; H = Hits; Avg. = Batting average; HR = Home runs; RBI = Runs batted in

Pos	Player	G	AB	H	Avg.	HR	RBI
C	Bill Rariden	79	247	55	.223	1	16
1B	Ben Houser	108	332	95	.286	8	59
2B	Bill Sweeney	153	593	204	.344	1	99
SS	Frank O'Rourke	61	196	24	.122	0	15
3B	Ed McDonald	121	459	119	.259	2	33
OF	John Titus	96	345	112	.325	2	48
OF	Vin Campbell	145	624	185	.296	3	52
OF	George Jackson	110	397	104	.262	4	51

==== Other batters ====
Note: G = Games played; AB = At bats; H = Hits; Avg. = Batting average; HR = Home runs; RBI = Runs batted in

Player	G	AB	H	Avg.	HR	RBI
Art Devlin	124	436	126	.289	0	57
Jay Kirke	103	359	115	.320	4	62
Johnny Kling	81	252	80	.317	2	29
Doc Miller	51	201	47	.234	2	24
Al Bridwell	31	106	25	.236	0	16
Hank Gowdy	44	96	26	.271	3	9
Harry Spratt	27	89	23	.258	3	12
Rabbit Maranville	26	86	18	.209	0	8
Al Kaiser	4	13	0	.000	0	0
Joe Schultz	4	12	3	.250	0	3
Dave Shean	4	10	3	.300	0	3
Gil Whitehouse	2	3	0	.000	0	0
Mike González	1	2	0	.000	0	0
Bill Jones	3	2	1	.500	0	0
Art Schwind	1	2	1	.500	0	0

=== Pitching ===
==== Starting pitchers ====
Note: G = Games pitched; IP = Innings pitched; W = Wins; L = Losses; ERA = Earned run average; SO = Strikeouts

Player	G	IP	W	L	ERA	SO
Lefty Tyler	42	256.1	12	22	4.18	144
Otto Hess	33	254.0	12	17	3.76	80
Hub Perdue	37	249.0	13	16	3.80	101
Buster Brown	31	168.1	4	15	4.01	68

==== Other pitchers ====
Note: G = Games pitched; IP = Innings pitched; W = Wins; L = Losses; ERA = Earned run average; SO = Strikeouts

Player	G	IP	W	L	ERA	SO
Walt Dickson	36	189.0	3	19	3.86	47
Ed Donnelly	37	184.1	5	10	4.35	67
Rube Kroh	3	6.1	0	0	5.68	1
Al Mattern	2	6.1	0	1	7.11	3

==== Relief pitchers ====
Note: G = Games pitched; W = Wins; L = Losses; SV = Saves; ERA = Earned run average; SO = Strikeouts

Player	G	W	L	SV	ERA	SO
Brad Hogg	10	1	1	1	6.97	12
Bill McTigue	10	2	0	0	5.45	17
Steve White	3	0	0	0	6.00	2
Hank Griffin	3	0	0	0	27.00	0
King Brady	1	0	0	0	20.25	0
Bill Brady	1	0	0	0	0.00	0
