= 1911 Boston Rustlers season =

1911 Boston Rustlers
- League: National League
- Ballpark: South End Grounds
- City: Boston, Massachusetts
- Record: 44–107 (.291)
- League place: 8th
- Owners: William Hepburn Russell
- Managers: Fred Tenney

The 1911 Boston Rustlers season was the 41st season of the franchise. With George Dovey having died in 1909, John Dovey sold the Boston Doves team after the 1910 season to John P. Harris. One month after purchasing the team, Harris sold it to William Hepburn Russell, who changed the team name to the Boston Rustlers and brought back former manager Fred Tenney. Tenney's retirement at the end of the season marked the end of an era, as he was the last player to have been a part of the 1890s dynasty teams. In spite of their 44–107 record, four players managed to hit over .300 for the season (Buck Herzog and Mike Donlin hit over .300 in part-time roles) led by Doc Miller, who hit .333. Bill Sweeney was the other full-time regular besides Miller to hit over .300, finishing at .314 for the season.

== Regular season ==
- May 22, 1911: Boston pitcher Cliff Curtis lost his 23rd game in a row, dating back to 1910, still the all-time record for consecutive losses by a pitcher.
- October 6, 1911: Boston pitcher Cy Young loses his final game (and third in a row) against the Brooklyn Dodgers at Washington Park. Young's 511th and final win came two weeks prior at Pittsburgh's Forbes Field.

=== Season standings ===
National League
Team	W	L	Pct.	GB	Home	Road
New York Giants	99	54	.647	—	49‍–‍25	50‍–‍29
Chicago Cubs	92	62	.597	7½	49‍–‍32	43‍–‍30
Pittsburgh Pirates	85	69	.552	14½	48‍–‍29	37‍–‍40
Philadelphia Phillies	79	73	.520	19½	42‍–‍34	37‍–‍39
St. Louis Cardinals	75	74	.503	22	36‍–‍38	39‍–‍36
Cincinnati Reds	70	83	.458	29	38‍–‍42	32‍–‍41
Brooklyn Trolley Dodgers	64	86	.427	33½	31‍–‍42	33‍–‍44
Boston Rustlers	44	107	.291	54	19‍–‍54	25‍–‍53

=== Record vs. opponents ===
1911 National League record Sources:
Team	BSN	BRO	CHC	CIN	NYG	PHI	PIT	STL
Boston	—	12–10–1	5–17	4–17–1	7–15	6–16	3–19	7–13–3
Brooklyn	10–12–1	—	13–9	11–11	5–16–1	8–13–1	14–8	9–11–1
Chicago	17–5	9–13	—	14–8–1	11–11	15–7	10–12	16–6–2
Cincinnati	17–4–1	11–11	8–14–1	—	8–14	10–12	10–12–1	6–16–3
New York	15–7	16–5–1	11–11	14–8	—	12–10	16–6	15–7
Philadelphia	16–6	13–8–1	7–15	12–10	10–12	—	13–9	8–13
Pittsburgh	19–3	14–8	12–10	12–10–1	6–16	9–13	—	13–9
St. Louis	13–7–3	11–9–1	6–16–2	16–6–3	7–15	13–8	9–13	—

=== Roster ===
1911 Boston Rustlers
Roster
Pitchers: Buster Brown; Billy Burke; Cliff Curtis; Ed Donnelly; George Ferguson; Sam Frock; Hank Griffin; Brad Hogg; Al Mattern; Bill McTigue; Jiggs Parson; Hub Perdue; Big Jeff Pfeffer; Fuller Thompson; Lefty Tyler; Orlie Weaver; Cy Young	Catchers: Peaches Graham; Johnny Kling; Bill Rariden; Infielders: Al Bridwell; Art Butler; Hank Gowdy; Buck Herzog; Ben Houser; Scotty Ingerton; Ed McDonald; Harry Spratt; Harry Steinfeldt; Bill Sweeney; Fred Tenney; Herman Young	Outfielders: Josh Clarke; Bill Collins; Mike Donlin; Patsy Flaherty; Wilbur Good; George Jackson; Bill Jones; Al Kaiser; Jay Kirke; Doc Miller; Other batters: Bert Weeden	Manager: Fred Tenney

== Player stats ==
=== Batting ===
==== Starters by position ====
Note: Pos = Position; G = Games played; AB = At bats; H = Hits; Avg. = Batting average; HR = Home runs; RBI = Runs batted in

Pos	Player	G	AB	H	Avg.	HR	RBI
C	Johnny Kling	75	241	54	.224	2	24
1B	Fred Tenney	102	369	97	.263	1	36
2B	Bill Sweeney	137	523	164	.314	3	63
SS	Buck Herzog	79	294	91	.310	5	41
3B	Scotty Ingerton	136	521	130	.250	5	61
OF	Mike Donlin	56	222	70	.315	2	34
OF	Al Kaiser	66	197	40	.203	2	15
OF	Doc Miller	146	577	192	.333	7	91

==== Other batters ====
Note: G = Games played; AB = At bats; H = Hits; Avg. = Batting average; HR = Home runs; RBI = Runs batted in

Player	G	AB	H	Avg.	HR	RBI
Bill Rariden	70	246	56	.228	0	21
Al Bridwell	51	182	53	.291	0	10
Ed McDonald	54	175	36	.206	1	21
Wilbur Good	43	165	44	.267	0	15
Harry Spratt	62	154	37	.240	2	13
George Jackson	39	147	51	.347	0	25
Josh Clarke	32	120	28	.233	1	4
Hank Gowdy	29	97	28	.289	0	16
Patsy Flaherty	38	94	27	.287	2	20
Jay Kirke	20	89	32	.360	0	12
Peaches Graham	33	88	24	.273	0	12
Ben Houser	20	71	18	.254	1	9
Art Butler	27	68	12	.176	0	2
Harry Steinfeldt	19	63	16	.254	1	8
Bill Jones	24	51	11	.216	0	3
Bill Collins	17	44	6	.136	0	8
Herman Young	9	25	6	.240	0	0
Bert Weeden	1	1	0	.000	0	0

=== Pitching ===
==== Starting pitchers ====
Note: G = Games pitched; IP = Innings pitched; W = Wins; L = Losses; ERA = Earned run average; SO = Strikeouts

Player	G	IP	W	L	ERA	SO
Lefty Tyler	28	165.1	7	10	5.06	90
Hub Perdue	24	137.1	6	10	4.98	40
Cy Young	11	80.0	4	5	3.71	35
Cliff Curtis	12	77.0	1	8	4.44	23
Ed Donnelly	5	36.2	3	2	2.45	16

==== Other pitchers ====
Note: G = Games pitched; IP = Innings pitched; W = Wins; L = Losses; ERA = Earned run average; SO = Strikeouts

Player	G	IP	W	L	ERA	SO
Buster Brown	42	241.0	8	18	4.29	76
Al Mattern	33	186.1	4	15	4.97	51
Orlie Weaver	27	121.0	3	12	6.47	50
Big Jeff Pfeffer	26	97.0	7	5	4.73	24
Hank Griffin	15	82.2	0	6	5.23	30
Bill McTigue	14	37.0	0	5	7.05	23
Brad Hogg	8	25.2	0	3	6.66	8
Cecil Ferguson	6	24.0	1	3	9.75	4
Sam Frock	4	16.0	0	1	5.63	8
Patsy Flaherty	4	14.0	0	2	7.07	0
Billy Burke	2	3.1	0	1	18.90	1

==== Relief pitchers ====
Note: G = Games pitched; W = Wins; L = Losses; SV = Saves; ERA = Earned run average; SO = Strikeouts

Player	G	W	L	SV	ERA	SO
Jiggs Parson	7	0	1	0	6.48	7
Fuller Thompson	3	0	0	0	3.86	0

== See also ==
- List of worst Major League Baseball season records
