= 1911 Chicago Cubs season =

1911 Chicago Cubs
- League: National League
- Ballpark: West Side Park
- City: Chicago
- Record: 92–62 (.597)
- League place: 2nd
- Owners: Charles Murphy
- Managers: Frank Chance

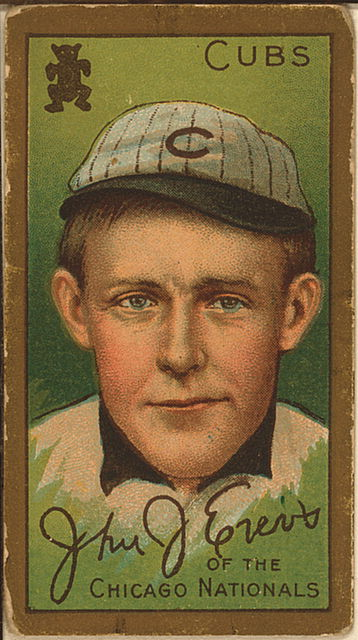
John J. Evers, Chicago Cubs, baseball card portrait

The 1911 Chicago Cubs season was the 40th season of the Chicago Cubs franchise, the 36th in the National League and the 19th at West Side Park. The Cubs finished second in the National League with a record of 92–62.

== Regular season ==
=== Season standings ===
National League
Team	W	L	Pct.	GB	Home	Road
New York Giants	99	54	.647	—	49‍–‍25	50‍–‍29
Chicago Cubs	92	62	.597	7½	49‍–‍32	43‍–‍30
Pittsburgh Pirates	85	69	.552	14½	48‍–‍29	37‍–‍40
Philadelphia Phillies	79	73	.520	19½	42‍–‍34	37‍–‍39
St. Louis Cardinals	75	74	.503	22	36‍–‍38	39‍–‍36
Cincinnati Reds	70	83	.458	29	38‍–‍42	32‍–‍41
Brooklyn Trolley Dodgers	64	86	.427	33½	31‍–‍42	33‍–‍44
Boston Rustlers	44	107	.291	54	19‍–‍54	25‍–‍53

=== Record vs. opponents ===
1911 National League record Sources:
Team	BSN	BRO	CHC	CIN	NYG	PHI	PIT	STL
Boston	—	12–10–1	5–17	4–17–1	7–15	6–16	3–19	7–13–3
Brooklyn	10–12–1	—	13–9	11–11	5–16–1	8–13–1	14–8	9–11–1
Chicago	17–5	9–13	—	14–8–1	11–11	15–7	10–12	16–6–2
Cincinnati	17–4–1	11–11	8–14–1	—	8–14	10–12	10–12–1	6–16–3
New York	15–7	16–5–1	11–11	14–8	—	12–10	16–6	15–7
Philadelphia	16–6	13–8–1	7–15	12–10	10–12	—	13–9	8–13
Pittsburgh	19–3	14–8	12–10	12–10–1	6–16	9–13	—	13–9
St. Louis	13–7–3	11–9–1	6–16–2	16–6–3	7–15	13–8	9–13	—

=== Notable transactions ===
- August 18, 1911: Jack Rowan was traded by the Phillies to the Chicago Cubs for Cliff Curtis.

== Roster ==
1911 Chicago Cubs
Roster
Pitchers: Mordecai Brown; Larry Cheney; King Cole; Cliff Curtis; Bill Foxen; Hank Griffin; Harry McIntire; Ernie Ovitz; Jack Pfiester; Ed Reulbach; Lew Richie; Reggie Richter; Jack Rowan; Cy Slapnicka; Charlie Smith; Fred Toney; Orlie Weaver	Catchers: Jimmy Archer; Peaches Graham; Johnny Kling; Tom Needham; Infielders: Kitty Bransfield; Frank Chance; Jim Doyle; Johnny Evers; Vic Saier; Dave Shean; Joe Tinker; Heinie Zimmerman	Outfielders: Bill Collins; Wilbur Good; Solly Hofman; Al Kaiser; Wildfire Schulte; Jimmy Sheckard	Manager: Frank Chance

== Player stats ==
=== Batting ===
==== Starters by position ====
Note: Pos = Position; G = Games played; AB = At bats; H = Hits; Avg. = Batting average; HR = Home runs; RBI = Runs batted in

Pos	Player	G	AB	H	Avg.	HR	RBI
C	Jimmy Archer	116	387	98	.253	4	41
1B	Vic Saier	86	259	67	.259	1	37
2B	Heinie Zimmerman	143	535	164	.307	9	85
SS	Joe Tinker	144	536	149	.278	4	69
3B	Jim Doyle	130	472	133	.282	5	62
OF	Jimmy Sheckard	156	539	149	.276	4	50
OF	Frank Schulte	154	577	173	.300	21	107
OF	Solly Hofman	143	512	129	.252	2	70

==== Other batters ====
Note: G = Games played; AB = At bats; H = Hits; Avg. = Batting average; HR = Home runs; RBI = Runs batted in

Player	G	AB	H	Avg.	HR	RBI
Johnny Evers	46	155	35	.226	0	7
Dave Shean	54	145	28	.193	0	15
Wilbur Good	58	145	39	.269	2	21
Frank Chance	31	88	21	.239	1	17
Al Kaiser	26	84	21	.250	0	7
Johnny Kling	27	80	14	.175	1	5
Peaches Graham	36	71	17	.239	0	8
Tom Needham	27	62	12	.194	0	5
Kitty Bransfield	3	10	4	.400	0	0
Bill Collins	7	3	1	.333	0	0

=== Pitching ===
==== Starting pitchers ====
Note: G = Games pitched; IP = Innings pitched; W = Wins; L = Losses; ERA = Earned run average; SO = Strikeouts

Player	G	IP	W	L	ERA	SO
Mordecai Brown	53	270.0	21	11	2.80	129
Lew Richie	36	253.0	15	11	2.31	78
Ed Reulbach	33	221.2	16	9	2.96	79
King Cole	32	221.1	18	7	3.13	101
Harry McIntire	25	149.0	11	7	4.11	56
Charlie Smith	7	38.0	3	2	1.42	11
Jack Pfiester	6	33.2	1	4	4.01	15
Cy Slapnicka	3	24.0	0	2	3.38	10
Hank Griffin	1	1.0	0	0	18.00	1

==== Other pitchers ====
Note: G = Games pitched; IP = Innings pitched; W = Wins; L = Losses; ERA = Earned run average; SO = Strikeouts

Player	G	IP	W	L	ERA	SO
Fred Toney	18	67.0	1	1	2.42	27
Reggie Richter	22	54.2	1	3	3.13	34
Orlie Weaver	6	43.2	2	2	2.06	20
Bill Foxen	3	13.0	1	1	2.08	6
Larry Cheney	3	10.0	1	0	0.00	11
Cliff Curtis	4	7.0	1	2	3.86	4

==== Relief pitchers ====
Note: G = Games pitched; W = Wins; L = Losses; SV = Saves; ERA = Earned run average; SO = Strikeouts

Player	G	W	L	SV	ERA	SO
Ernie Ovitz	1	0	0	0	4.50	0
Jack Rowan	1	0	0	0	4.50	0
