= List of Atlanta Braves seasons =

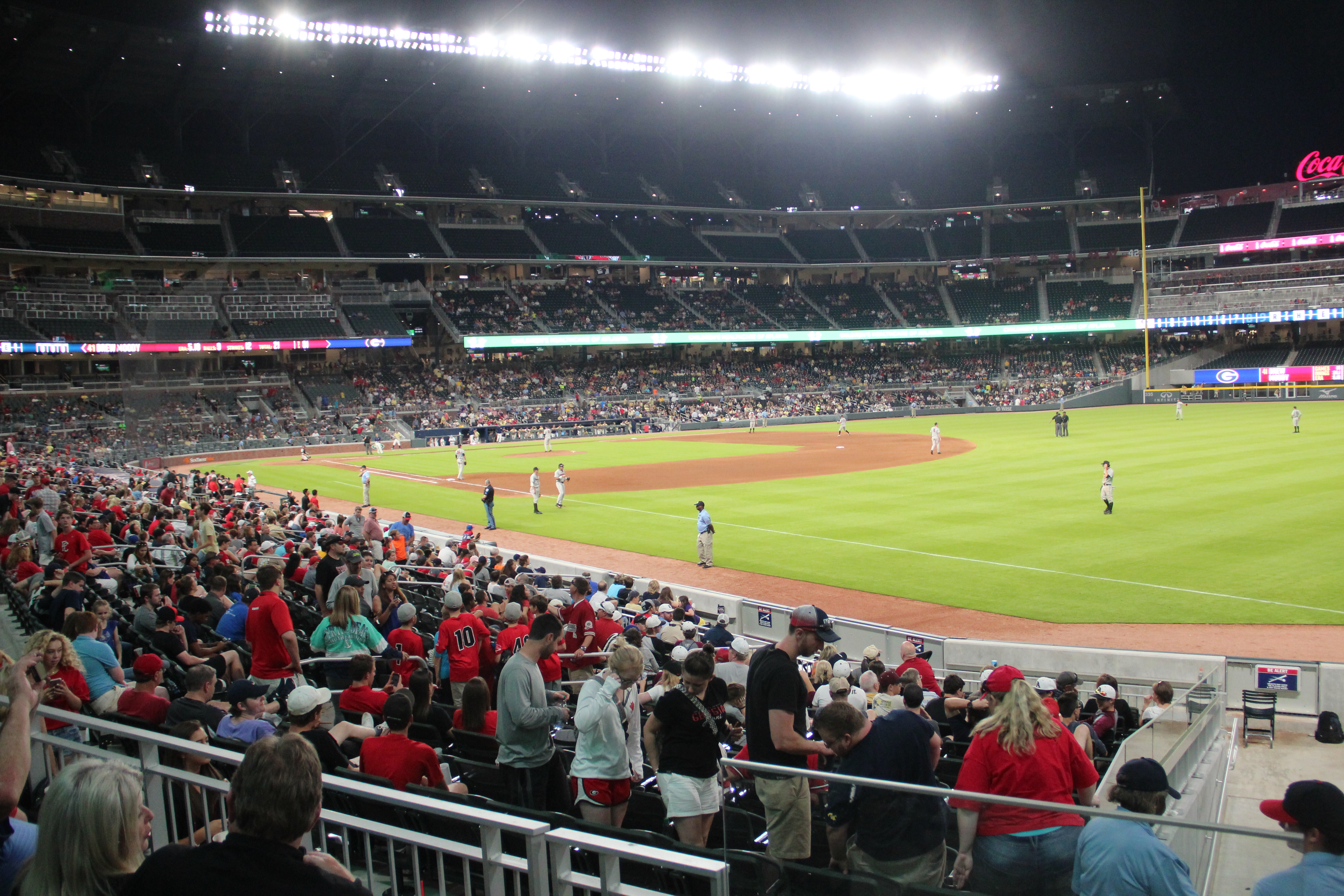
Truist Park, home field of the Braves since 2017

The Atlanta Braves have completed 152 years of professional baseball, the most in Major League Baseball. Through 2015, the Braves have played 20,994 regular season games in the National League and previously the National Association of Professional Base Ball Players, winning 10,595 games and losing 10,399 games, for a winning percentage of .505. In all MLB play, the team has a record of 10,677–10,483 through the 2015 season.

The team was founded in 1871 as the Boston Red Stockings and was one of the nine charter members of National Association of Professional Base Ball Players. The team changed its name to the Boston Red Caps in 1876 when it joined the National League. The team changed its name a few more times in the late 1800s and early 1900s before settling on the Braves name in 1912. In 1953, the team moved to Milwaukee. After 13 seasons in Milwaukee, the Braves moved again to their current city, Atlanta. The team played in Turner Field 1997 to 2016, and began the 2017 season playing in SunTrust Park.

The Braves have experienced several periods of success. The team was very dominant in the late nineteenth century, when it was known as the Boston Beaneaters, winning four of the five National Association of Professional Base Ball Players championships and eight National League pennants. In Milwaukee, the team never had a losing season. From 1991 until 2005 the Braves were one of the most successful franchises in baseball, winning fourteen consecutive division titles (omitting the strike-shortened 1994 season in which there were no official division champions) and five National League pennants. In the 2011 season, the Braves became the third team to win 10,000 MLB games. The franchise has won four World Series – one in Boston, one in Milwaukee and two in Atlanta.

In addition, the Braves have experienced periods of futility. The team had eleven straight losing seasons from 1903 through 1913, during six of which they lost over 100 games. After a short period of prominence, the Braves between 1917 and 1945 experienced only three winning records and five 100-loss seasons, including having the fourth worst record in MLB history in the 1935 season. Between 1970 and 1990, the Braves achieved just one postseason appearance and suffered seventeen losing seasons out of twenty-one. During the 2011 season, the Braves became the second franchise to lose 10,000 MLB games.

This article lists the results of every season of the franchise, including years based in Boston and Milwaukee.

== Table key ==
CPOY	Comeback Player of the Year Award
CYA	Cy Young Award
MLB season	Each year is linked to an article about that particular MLB season
MOY	National League Manager of the Year Award
NLCS	National League Championship Series
NLDS	National League Division Series
NLWC	National League Wild Card Series (2020, 2022–present); National League Wild Card Game (2012–2019, 2021)
MVP	Most Valuable Player Award
ROY	Rookie of the Year
RPOY	Reliever of the Year Award
Team season	Each year is linked to an article about that particular Braves season
WSMVP	World Series Most Valuable Player Award

== Year by year ==
Pre–World Series champions (Pre–1903) ^{‖}	World Series champions (1903–present) †	League champions (1871–present) *	Division champions (1969–present) ^	Wild card berth (1994–present) ¤

MLB season	Team season	League	Division	Finish	Wins	Losses	Win%	GB	Postseason	Awards
Boston Red Stockings
1871	1871	NA		3rd	20	10	.667	2		
1872	1872	NA *		1st	39	8	.830	—		
1873	1873	NA *		1st	43	16	.729	—		
1874	1874	NA *		1st	52	18	.743	—		
1875	1875	NA *		1st	71	8	.899	—		
Boston Red Caps
1876	1876	NL		4th	39	31	.557	15		
1877	1877	NL *		1st	42	18	.700	—		
1878	1878	NL *		1st	41	19	.683	—		
1879	1879	NL		2nd	54	30	.643	5		
1880	1880	NL		6th	40	44	.476	26.5		
1881	1881	NL		6th	38	45	.458	17.5		
1882	1882	NL		3rd	45	39	.536	10		
Boston Beaneaters
1883	1883	NL *		1st	63	35	.643	—		
1884	1884	NL		2nd	73	38	.658	10.5		
1885	1885	NL		5th	46	66	.411	41		
1886	1886	NL		5th	56	61	.479	30.5		
1887	1887	NL		5th	61	60	.504	16.5		
1888	1888	NL		4th	70	64	.522	15.5		
1889	1889	NL		2nd	83	45	.648	1		
1890	1890	NL		5th	76	57	.571	12		
1891	1891	NL *		1st	87	51	.630	—		
1892 ^{‖}	1892	NL ^{‡}		1st	102	48	.680	—	Won World Series (Spiders) 5–0 *	
1893	1893	NL *		1st	86	43	.667	—		
1894	1894	NL		3rd	83	49	.629	8		
1895	1895	NL		6th	71	60	.542	16.5		
1896	1896	NL		4th	74	57	.565	17		
1897	1897	NL *		1st	93	39	.705	—	Lost Temple Cup (Orioles) 4–1 *	
1898	1898	NL *		1st	102	47	.685	—		
1899	1899	NL		2nd	95	57	.625	8		
1900	1900	NL		4th	66	72	.478	17		
1901	1901	NL		5th	69	69	.500	20.5		
1902	1902	NL		3rd	73	64	.533	29		
1903	1903	NL		6th	58	80	.420	32		
1904	1904	NL		7th	55	98	.359	51		
1905	1905	NL		7th	51	103	.331	54.5		
1906	1906	NL		8th	49	102	.325	66.5		
Boston Doves
1907	1907	NL		7th	58	90	.392	47		
1908	1908	NL		6th	63	91	.409	36		
1909	1909	NL		8th	45	108	.294	65.5		
1910	1910	NL		8th	53	100	.346	50.5		
Boston Rustlers
1911	1911	NL		8th	44	107	.291	54		
Boston Braves
1912	1912	NL		8th	52	101	.340	52		
1913	1913	NL		5th	69	82	.457	31.5		
1914 †	1914	NL *		1st	94	59	.614	—	Won World Series (Athletics) 4–0 †	Johnny Evers (MVP)
1915	1915	NL		2nd	83	69	.546	7		
1916	1916	NL		3rd	89	63	.586	4		
1917	1917	NL		6th	72	81	.471	25.5		
1918	1918	NL		7th	53	71	.427	28.5		
1919	1919	NL		6th	57	82	.410	38.5		
1920	1920	NL		7th	62	90	.408	30		
1921	1921	NL		4th	79	74	.516	15		
1922	1922	NL		8th	53	100	.346	39.5		
1923	1923	NL		7th	54	100	.351	41.5		
1924	1924	NL		8th	53	100	.346	40		
1925	1925	NL		5th	70	83	.458	25		
1926	1926	NL		7th	66	86	.434	22		
1927	1927	NL		7th	60	94	.390	34		
1928	1928	NL		7th	50	103	.327	34		
1929	1929	NL		8th	56	98	.364	43		
1930	1930	NL		6th	70	84	.455	22		
1931	1931	NL		7th	64	90	.416	37		
1932	1932	NL		5th	77	77	.500	13		
1933	1933	NL		4th	83	71	.539	9		
1934	1934	NL		4th	78	73	.517	16		
1935	1935	NL		8th	38	115	.248	61.5		
Boston Bees
1936	1936	NL		6th	71	83	.461	21		
1937	1937	NL		5th	79	73	.520	16		
1938	1938	NL		5th	77	75	.507	12		
1939	1939	NL		7th	63	88	.417	32.5		
1940	1940	NL		7th	65	87	.428	34.5		
Boston Braves
1941	1941	NL		7th	62	92	.403	38		
1942	1942	NL		7th	59	89	.403	44		
1943	1943	NL		6th	68	85	.444	36.5		
1944	1944	NL		6th	65	89	.422	36.5		
1945	1945	NL		6th	67	85	.441	30		
1946	1946	NL		4th	81	72	.529	15.5		
1947	1947	NL		3rd	86	68	.558	8		Bob Elliott (MVP)
1948	1948	NL *		1st	91	62	.595	—	Lost World Series (Indians) 4–2 *	Alvin Dark (ROY)
1949	1949	NL		4th	75	79	.487	22		
1950	1950	NL		4th	83	71	.539	8		Sam Jethroe (ROY)
1951	1951	NL		4th	76	78	.494	20.5		
1952	1952	NL		7th	64	89	.418	32		
Milwaukee Braves
1953	1953	NL		2nd	92	62	.597	13		
1954	1954	NL		3rd	89	65	.578	8		
1955	1955	NL		2nd	85	69	.552	13.5		
1956	1956	NL		2nd	92	62	.597	1		
1957 †	1957	NL *		1st	95	59	.617	—	Won World Series (Yankees) 4–3 †	Hank Aaron (MVP); Warren Spahn (CYA); Lew Burdette (WS MVP)
1958	1958	NL *		1st	92	62	.597	—	Lost World Series (Yankees) 4–3 *	
1959	1959	NL		2nd	86	70	.551	2		
1960	1960	NL		2nd	88	66	.571	7		
1961	1961	NL		4th	83	71	.539	10		
1962	1962	NL		5th	86	76	.531	15.5		
1963	1963	NL		6th	84	78	.519	15		
1964	1964	NL		5th	88	74	.543	5		
1965	1965	NL		5th	86	76	.531	11		
Atlanta Braves
1966	1966	NL		5th	85	77	.525	10		
1967	1967	NL		7th	77	85	.475	24.5		
1968	1968	NL		5th	81	81	.500	16		
1969	1969	NL	West ^	1st	93	69	.574	—	Lost NLCS (Mets) 3–0	
1970	1970	NL	West	5th	76	86	.469	26		
1971	1971	NL	West	3rd	82	80	.506	8		Earl Williams (ROY)
1972	1972	NL	West	4th	70	84	.455	25		
1973	1973	NL	West	5th	76	85	.472	22.5		
1974	1974	NL	West	3rd	88	74	.543	14		
1975	1975	NL	West	5th	67	94	.416	40.5		
1976	1976	NL	West	6th	70	92	.432	32		
1977	1977	NL	West	6th	61	101	.377	37		
1978	1978	NL	West	6th	69	93	.426	26		Bob Horner (ROY)
1979	1979	NL	West	6th	66	94	.413	23.5		
1980	1980	NL	West	4th	81	80	.503	11		
1981	1981	NL	West	5th	50	56	.472	15		
1982	1982	NL	West ^	1st	89	73	.549	—	Lost NLCS (Cardinals) 3–0	Dale Murphy (MVP)
1983	1983	NL	West	2nd	88	74	.543	3		Dale Murphy (MVP)
1984	1984	NL	West	2nd	80	82	.494	12		
1985	1985	NL	West	5th	66	96	.407	29		
1986	1986	NL	West	6th	72	89	.447	23.5		
1987	1987	NL	West	5th	69	92	.429	20.5		
1988	1988	NL	West	6th	54	106	.338	39.5		
1989	1989	NL	West	6th	63	97	.394	28		
1990	1990	NL	West	6th	65	97	.401	26		David Justice (ROY)
1991	1991	NL *	West ^	1st	94	68	.580	—	Won NLCS (Pirates) 4–3; Lost World Series (Twins) 4–3 *	Terry Pendleton (MVP); Tom Glavine (CYA); Bobby Cox (MOY)
1992	1992	NL *	West ^	1st	98	64	.605	—	Won NLCS (Pirates) 4–3; Lost World Series (Blue Jays) 4–2 *	
1993	1993	NL	West ^	1st	104	58	.642	—	Lost NLCS (Phillies) 4–2	Greg Maddux (CYA)
1994^{[d]}	1994	NL	East	2nd	68	46	.586	6	Playoffs Cancelled	Greg Maddux (CYA)
1995 †	1995	NL *	East ^	1st	90	54	.625	—	Won NLDS (Rockies) 3–1; Won NLCS (Reds) 4–0; Won World Series (Indians) 4–2 †	Greg Maddux (CYA); Tom Glavine (WS MVP)
1996	1996	NL *	East ^	1st	96	66	.593	—	Won NLDS (Dodgers) 3–0; Won NLCS (Cardinals) 4–3; Lost World Series (Yankees) 4–2 *	John Smoltz (CYA)
1997	1997	NL	East ^	1st	101	61	.623	—	Won NLDS (Astros) 3–0; Lost NLCS (Marlins) 4–2	
1998	1998	NL	East ^	1st	106	56	.654	—	Won NLDS (Cubs) 3–0; Lost NLCS (Padres) 4–2	Tom Glavine (CYA)
1999	1999	NL *	East ^	1st	103	59	.636	—	Won NLDS (Astros) 3–1; Won NLCS (Mets) 4–2; Lost World Series (Yankees) 4–0 *	Chipper Jones (MVP)
2000	2000	NL	East ^	1st	95	67	.586	—	Lost NLDS (Cardinals) 3–0	Rafael Furcal (ROY)
2001	2001	NL	East ^	1st	88	74	.543	—	Won NLDS (Astros) 3–0; Lost NLCS (Diamondbacks) 4–1	
2002	2002	NL	East ^	1st	101	59	.631	—	Lost NLDS (Giants) 3–2	
2003	2003	NL	East ^	1st	101	61	.623	—	Lost NLDS (Cubs) 3–2	
2004	2004	NL	East ^	1st	96	66	.593	—	Lost NLDS (Astros) 3–2	Bobby Cox (MOY)
2005	2005	NL	East ^	1st	90	72	.556	—	Lost NLDS (Astros) 3–1	Bobby Cox (MOY)
2006	2006	NL	East	3rd	79	83	.488	18		
2007	2007	NL	East	3rd	84	78	.519	5		
2008	2008	NL	East	4th	72	90	.444	20		
2009	2009	NL	East	3rd	86	76	.531	7		
2010	2010	NL	East	2nd ¤	91	71	.562	6	Lost NLDS (Giants) 3–1	Tim Hudson (CPOY)
2011	2011	NL	East	2nd	89	73	.549	13		Craig Kimbrel (ROY)
2012	2012	NL	East	2nd ¤	94	68	.580	4	Lost NLWC (Cardinals)	
2013	2013	NL	East ^	1st	96	66	.593	—	Lost NLDS (Dodgers) 3–1	
2014	2014	NL	East	T–2nd	79	83	.488	17		Craig Kimbrel (RPOY)
2015	2015	NL	East	4th	67	95	.414	23		
2016	2016	NL	East	5th	68	93	.422	26.5		
2017	2017	NL	East	3rd	72	90	.444	25		
2018	2018	NL	East ^	1st	90	72	.556	—	Lost NLDS (Dodgers) 3–1	Ronald Acuña Jr. (ROY); Brian Snitker (MOY); Jonny Venters (CPOY)
2019	2019	NL	East ^	1st	97	65	.599	—	Lost NLDS (Cardinals) 3–2	Josh Donaldson (CPOY)
2020^{[e]}	2020	NL	East ^	1st	35	25	.583	—	Won NLWC (Reds) 2–0; Won NLDS (Marlins) 3–0; Lost NLCS (Dodgers) 4–3	Freddie Freeman (MVP)
2021 †	2021	NL *	East ^	1st	88	73	.547	—	Won NLDS (Brewers) 3–1; Won NLCS (Dodgers) 4–2; Won World Series (Astros) 4–2 †	Jorge Soler (WS MVP)
2022	2022	NL	East ^	1st	101	61	.623	—	Lost NLDS (Phillies) 3–1	Michael Harris II (ROY)
2023	2023	NL	East ^	1st	104	58	.642	—	Lost NLDS (Phillies) 3–1	Ronald Acuña Jr. (MVP)
2024	2024	NL	East	2nd ¤	89	73	.549	6	Lost NLWC (Padres) 2–0	Chris Sale (CYA)
2025	2025	NL	East	4th	76	86	.469	20		Drake Baldwin (ROY)
2026	2026	NL	East ^	1st	94	68	.580	—	Won NLWC (Phillies) 2–1; Lost NLDS (Dodgers) 3–1	
Totals					Wins	Losses	Win%			
Totals					11,284	11,103	.504	All-time regular season record (1871–2025)		
Totals					105	113	.482	All-time postseason record		
Totals					11,389	11,216	.504	All-time regular and postseason record (1871–2025)		

These statistics are current at the conclusion of the 2025 Major League Baseball season.

== Record by decade ==
The following table describes the Braves' MLB win–loss record by decade.

Decade	Wins	Losses	Pct
1870s	176	98	.642
1880s	575	497	.536
1890s	869	508	.631
1900s	587	877	.401
1910s	666	815	.450
1920s	603	928	.394
1930s	700	829	.458
1940s	719	808	.471
1950s	854	687	.554
1960s	851	753	.531
1970s	725	883	.451
1980s	712	845	.457
1990s	925	629	.595
2000s	892	726	.551
2010s	843	776	.521
2020s	493	376	.567
All-time	11190	11035	.503

These statistics are from Baseball-Reference.com's Atlanta Braves History & Encyclopedia, and are current as of October 2, 2024. These statistics do not include post-season play or the seasons from 1871 through 1875.

== Postseason record by year ==
The Braves have reached the postseason thirty-one times in their history, with the first being in 1914 and the most recent being in 2026.

Postseason record by year
Year	Finish	Round	Opponent	Result		
1914	World Series Champions	World Series	Philadelphia Athletics	Won	4	0
1948	National League Champions	World Series	Cleveland Indians	Lost	2	4
1957	World Series Champions	World Series	New York Yankees	Won	4	3
1958	National League Champions	World Series	New York Yankees	Lost	3	4
1969	National League West Champions	NLCS	New York Mets	Lost	0	3
1982	National League West Champions	NLCS	St Louis Cardinals	Lost	0	3
1991	National League Champions	NLCS	Pittsburgh Pirates	Won	4	3
1991	National League Champions	World Series	Minnesota Twins	Lost	3	4
1992	National League Champions	NLCS	Pittsburgh Pirates	Won	4	3
1992	National League Champions	World Series	Toronto Blue Jays	Lost	2	4
1993	National League West Champions	NLCS	Philadelphia Phillies	Lost	2	4
1995	World Series Champions	NLDS	Colorado Rockies	Won	3	1
1995	World Series Champions	NLCS	Cincinnati Reds	Won	4	0
1995	World Series Champions	World Series	Cleveland Indians	Won	4	2
1996	National League Champions	NLDS	Los Angeles Dodgers	Won	3	0
1996	National League Champions	NLCS	St Louis Cardinals	Won	4	3
1996	National League Champions	World Series	New York Yankees	Lost	2	4
1997	National League East Champions	NLDS	Houston Astros	Won	3	0
1997	National League East Champions	NLCS	Florida Marlins	Lost	2	4
1998	National League East Champions	NLDS	Chicago Cubs	Won	3	0
1998	National League East Champions	NLCS	San Diego Padres	Lost	2	4
1999	National League Champions	NLDS	Houston Astros	Won	3	1
1999	National League Champions	NLCS	New York Mets	Won	4	2
1999	National League Champions	World Series	New York Yankees	Lost	0	4
2000	National League East Champions	NLDS	St Louis Cardinals	Lost	0	3
2001	National League East Champions	NLDS	Houston Astros	Won	3	0
2001	National League East Champions	NLCS	Arizona Diamondbacks	Lost	1	4
2002	National League East Champions	NLDS	San Francisco Giants	Lost	2	3
2003	National League East Champions	NLDS	Chicago Cubs	Lost	2	3
2004	National League East Champions	NLDS	Houston Astros	Lost	2	3
2005	National League East Champions	NLDS	Houston Astros	Lost	1	3
2010	National League Wild Card	NLDS	San Francisco Giants	Lost	1	3
2012	National League Wild Card	NLWC	St Louis Cardinals	Lost	0	1
2013	National League East Champions	NLDS	Los Angeles Dodgers	Lost	1	3
2018	National League East Champions	NLDS	Los Angeles Dodgers	Lost	1	3
2019	National League East Champions	NLDS	St Louis Cardinals	Lost	2	3
2020	National League East Champions	NLWC	Cincinnati Reds	Won	2	0
2020	National League East Champions	NLDS	Miami Marlins	Won	3	0
2020	National League East Champions	NLCS	Los Angeles Dodgers	Lost	3	4
2021	World Series Champions	NLDS	Milwaukee Brewers	Won	3	1
2021	World Series Champions	NLCS	Los Angeles Dodgers	Won	4	2
2021	World Series Champions	World Series	Houston Astros	Won	4	2
2022	National League East Champions	NLDS	Philadelphia Phillies	Lost	1	3
2023	National League East Champions	NLDS	Philadelphia Phillies	Lost	1	3
2024	National League Wild Card	NLWC	San Diego Padres	Lost	0	2
2026	National League East Champions	NLWC	Philadelphia Phillies	Won	2	1
2026	National League East Champions	NLDS	Los Angeles Dodgers	Lost	1	3
31	Totals			20-27	105	113

== Footnotes ==
- ^{a} The Finish column lists regular season results and excludes postseason play.
- ^{b} The Wins and Losses columns list regular season results and exclude any postseason play. Regular and postseason records are combined only at the bottom of the list.
- ^{c} The GB column lists "Games Back" from the team that finished in first place that season. It is determined by finding the difference in wins plus the difference in losses divided by two.
- ^{d} The 1994–95 Major League Baseball strike ended the season on August 11, consequently cancelling the entire postseason.
- ^{e} In 2020, during the COVID-19 pandemic, Major League Baseball submitted a 60-game schedule for teams to play without fans in the stadiums.
