= 1912 New York Giants season =

1912 New York Giants
- National League champions
- League: National League
- Ballpark: Polo Grounds
- City: New York City
- Record: 103–48 (.682)
- League place: 1st
- Owners: John T. Brush
- Managers: John McGraw

The 1912 New York Giants season was the franchise's 30th season. It involved the Giants winning the National League pennant. They were beaten by the Boston Red Sox in the World Series. Fred Snodgrass took most of the blame, as he dropped a fly ball in the deciding contest.

Led by manager John McGraw, the Giants dominated the NL, opening the season 54–11 and building a 16 1/2-game lead by July 3. On the offensive side, they led the league in runs scored. Larry Doyle finished fourth in the batting race and was voted league MVP. Chief Meyers had one of the greatest offensive seasons ever for a catcher and was second in batting.

They also had a successful pitching staff. Jeff Tesreau, Hall of Famer Christy Mathewson, and Red Ames finished 1–2–5 in league ERA. Rube Marquard's 18-game winning streak was the top story in baseball.

Taken together with the 1911 and 1913 pennant winners, this team is considered one of the greatest of all-time. It also makes up a good portion of the 1966 book The Glory of Their Times, as Marquard, Meyers, and Snodgrass were three of the players interviewed.

== Regular season ==
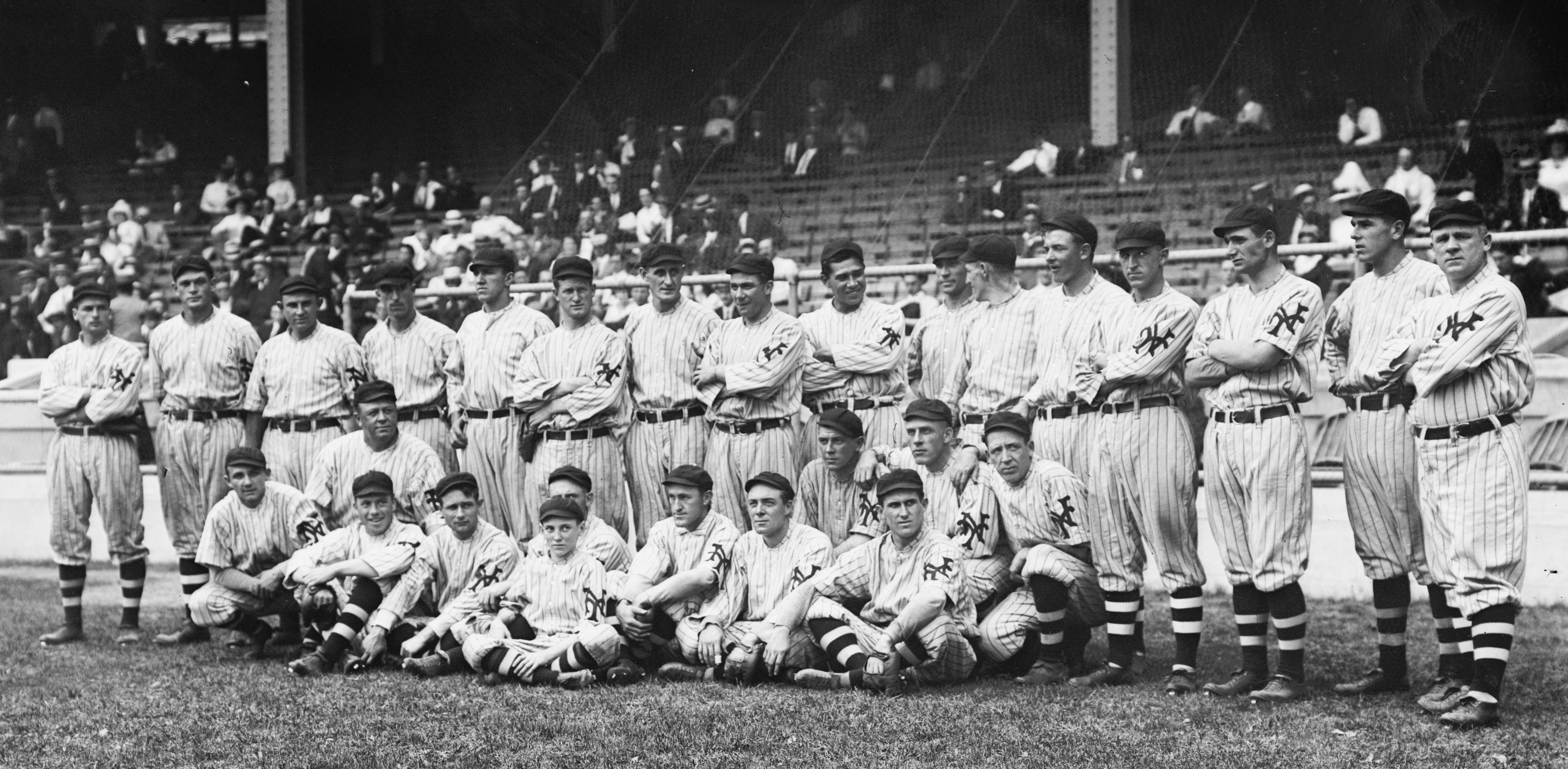
1912 New York Giants

=== Season standings ===
National League
Team	W	L	Pct.	GB	Home	Road
New York Giants	103	48	.682	—	49‍–‍25	54‍–‍23
Pittsburgh Pirates	93	58	.616	10	44‍–‍31	49‍–‍27
Chicago Cubs	91	59	.607	11½	46‍–‍30	45‍–‍29
Cincinnati Reds	75	78	.490	29	45‍–‍32	30‍–‍46
Philadelphia Phillies	73	79	.480	30½	34‍–‍41	39‍–‍38
St. Louis Cardinals	63	90	.412	41	37‍–‍40	26‍–‍50
Brooklyn Trolley Dodgers	58	95	.379	46	33‍–‍43	25‍–‍52
Boston Braves	52	101	.340	52	31‍–‍47	21‍–‍54

=== Record vs. opponents ===
1912 National League record Sources:
Team	BSN	BRO	CHC	CIN	NYG	PHI	PIT	STL
Boston	—	9–13	5–17	11–11	3–18–1	10–12	4–18–1	10–12
Brooklyn	13–9	—	5–17	6–16	6–16	9–13	8–14	11–10
Chicago	17–5	17–5	—	11–10–1	13–9–1	10–10	8–13	15–7
Cincinnati	11–11	16–6	10–11–1	—	6–16–1	8–14	11–11	13–9
New York	18–3–1	16–6	9–13–1	16–6–1	—	17–5	12–8	15–7
Philadelphia	12–10	13–9	10–10	14–8	5–17	—	8–14	11–11
Pittsburgh	18–4–1	14–8	13–8	11–11	8–12	14–8	—	15–7
St. Louis	12–10	10–11	7–15	9–13	7–15	11–11	7–15	—

=== Roster ===
1912 New York Giants
Roster
Pitchers: Red Ames; Lore Bader; Doc Crandall; Al Demaree; Louis Drucke; Ted Goulait; LaRue Kirby; Rube Marquard; Christy Mathewson; Ernie Shore; Jeff Tesreau; Hooks Wiltse	Catchers: Grover Hartley; Chief Meyers; Art Wilson; Infielders: Larry Doyle; Art Fletcher; Heinie Groh; Buck Herzog; Fred Merkle; Dave Robertson; Tillie Shafer	Outfielders: Beals Becker; George Burns; Josh Devore; Moose McCormick; Red Murray; Fred Snodgrass	Manager: John McGraw; Coaches: Wilbert Robinson

== Player stats ==
=== Batting ===
==== Starters by position ====
Note: Pos = Position; G = Games played; AB = At bats; H = Hits; Avg. = Batting average; HR = Home runs; RBI = Runs batted in

Pos	Player	G	AB	H	Avg.	HR	RBI
C	Chief Meyers	126	371	133	.358	6	54
1B	Fred Merkle	129	479	148	.309	11	84
2B	Larry Doyle	143	558	184	.330	10	90
3B	Buck Herzog	140	482	127	.263	2	47
SS	Art Fletcher	129	419	118	.282	1	57
OF	Fred Snodgrass	146	535	144	.269	3	69
OF	Red Murray	143	549	152	.277	3	92
OF	Beals Becker	125	402	106	.264	6	58

==== Other batters ====
Note: G = Games played; AB = At bats; H = Hits; Avg. = Batting average; HR = Home runs; RBI = Runs batted in

Player	G	AB	H	Avg.	HR	RBI
Josh Devore	106	327	90	.275	2	37
Tillie Shafer	78	163	47	.288	0	24
Art Wilson	65	121	35	.289	3	20
George Burns	29	51	15	.294	0	5
Heinie Groh	27	48	13	.271	0	3
Moose McCormick	42	39	13	.333	0	7
Grover Hartley	25	34	8	.235	0	7
Dave Robertson	3	2	1	.500	0	0

=== Pitching ===
==== Starting pitchers ====
Note: G = Games pitched; IP = Innings pitched; W = Wins; L = Losses; ERA = Earned run average; SO = Strikeouts

Player	G	IP	W	L	ERA	SO
Christy Mathewson	43	310.0	23	12	2.12	134
Rube Marquard	43	294.2	26	11	2.57	175
Jeff Tesreau	36	243.0	17	7	1.96	119
Red Ames	33	179.0	11	5	2.46	83
Ted Goulait	1	7.0	0	0	6.43	6

==== Other pitchers ====
Note: G = Games pitched; IP = Innings pitched; W = Wins; L = Losses; ERA = Earned run average; SO = Strikeouts

Player	G	IP	W	L	ERA	SO
Doc Crandall	37	162.0	13	7	3.61	60
Hooks Wiltse	28	134.0	9	6	3.16	58
Al Demaree	2	16.0	1	0	1.69	11
LaRue Kirby	3	11.0	1	0	5.73	2
Lore Bader	2	10.0	2	0	0.90	3

==== Relief pitchers ====
Note: G = Games pitched; W = Wins; L = Losses; SV = Saves; ERA = Earned run average; SO = Strikeouts

Player	G	W	L	SV	ERA	SO
Louis Drucke	1	0	0	1	13.50	0
Ernie Shore	1	0	0	1	27.00	1

== Awards and honors ==
=== League top five finishers ===
Rube Marquard

- NL leader in wins (26)
- #3 in NL in strikeouts (175)

Christy Mathewson

- #2 in NL in ERA (2.12)
- #2 in NL in complete games (27)
- #4 in NL in wins (23)

Chief Meyers

- NL leader in on-base percentage (.441)
- #2 in NL in batting average (.358)
- #4 in NL in slugging percentage (.477)

Red Murray

- #4 in NL in stolen bases (38)

Fred Snodgrass

- #3 in NL in stolen bases (43)

Jeff Tesreau

- NL leader in ERA (1.96)

== 1912 World Series ==
AL Boston Red Sox (4) vs. NL New York Giants (3)

Game	Score	Date	Location	Attendance
1	Boston Red Sox – 4, New York Giants – 3,	October 8	Polo Grounds	35,730
2	New York Giants – 6, Boston Red Sox – 6	October 9	Fenway Park	30,148
3	New York Giants – 2, Boston Red Sox – 1	October 10	Fenway Park	34,624
4	Boston Red Sox – 3, New York Giants – 1	October 11	Polo Grounds	36,502
5	New York Giants – 1, Boston Red Sox – 2	October 12	Fenway Park	34,683
6	Boston Red Sox – 2, New York Giants – 5	October 14	Polo Grounds	30,622
7	New York Giants – 11, Boston Red Sox – 4	October 15	Fenway Park	32,694
8	New York Giants – 2, Boston Red Sox – 3	October 16	Fenway Park	17,034
