= Ed Donnelly =

Ed Donnelly may refer to:

- Ed Donnelly (1910s pitcher) (1879–1957), 1910–1911 Boston Braves baseball pitcher
- Ed Donnelly (1950s pitcher) (1932–1992), 1959 Chicago Cubs baseball pitcher
