= Bert Weeden =

American baseball player (1882-1939)

- Pinch hitter
- Born: December 21, 1882; Northwood, New Hampshire, U.S.
- Died: January 7, 1939 (aged 56); Northwood, New Hampshire, U.S.
- Batted: Left Threw: Right

MLB debut
- June 4, 1911, for the Boston Rustlers

Last MLB appearance
- June 4, 1911, for the Boston Rustlers

MLB statistics
- Games played: 1
- At bats: 1
- Hits: 0
- Stats at Baseball Reference

Teams
- Boston Rustlers (1911)

Charles Albert Weeden (December 21, 1882 – January 7, 1939) was an American professional baseball player.

Weeden was a catcher during his long minor-league career, which spanned 1902 to 1923. He also had several jobs as a manager, and he continued to manage as late as 1936 at the amateur level.

Weeden played in one major-league game, with the 1911 Boston Rustlers as a pinch hitter. His lone major-league at bat came on June 4, 1911, in a road game against the Cincinnati Reds—he failed to register a hit against reliever Barney Schreiber in a game that the Reds won, 26–3.

Weeden was born in 1882 in Northwood, New Hampshire; he died in his hometown in 1939 of a heart attack. His obituary noted that he served in the American Expeditionary Forces during World War I.
