= 1911 New York Giants season =

1911 New York Giants
- National League champions
- League: National League
- Ballpark: Polo Grounds (since 1889); Hilltop Park (since 1911)
- City: New York City
- Record: 99–54 (.647)
- League place: 1st
- Owners: John T. Brush
- Managers: John McGraw

The 1911 New York Giants season was the franchise's 29th season. The Giants won their first of three consecutive National League pennants. They were defeated by the Philadelphia Athletics in the World Series. The team set and still holds the Major League Baseball single-season record for stolen bases during the modern era (since 1901), with 347.

Led by manager John McGraw, the Giants won the National League pennant by 7 1/2 games. On the offensive side, they finished second in runs scored. On the defensive side, they allowed the fewest. Hall of Famer Christy Mathewson led the league in earned run average, and Rube Marquard had the most strikeouts. The Giants hit 103 triples, the most in franchise history.

== Regular season ==
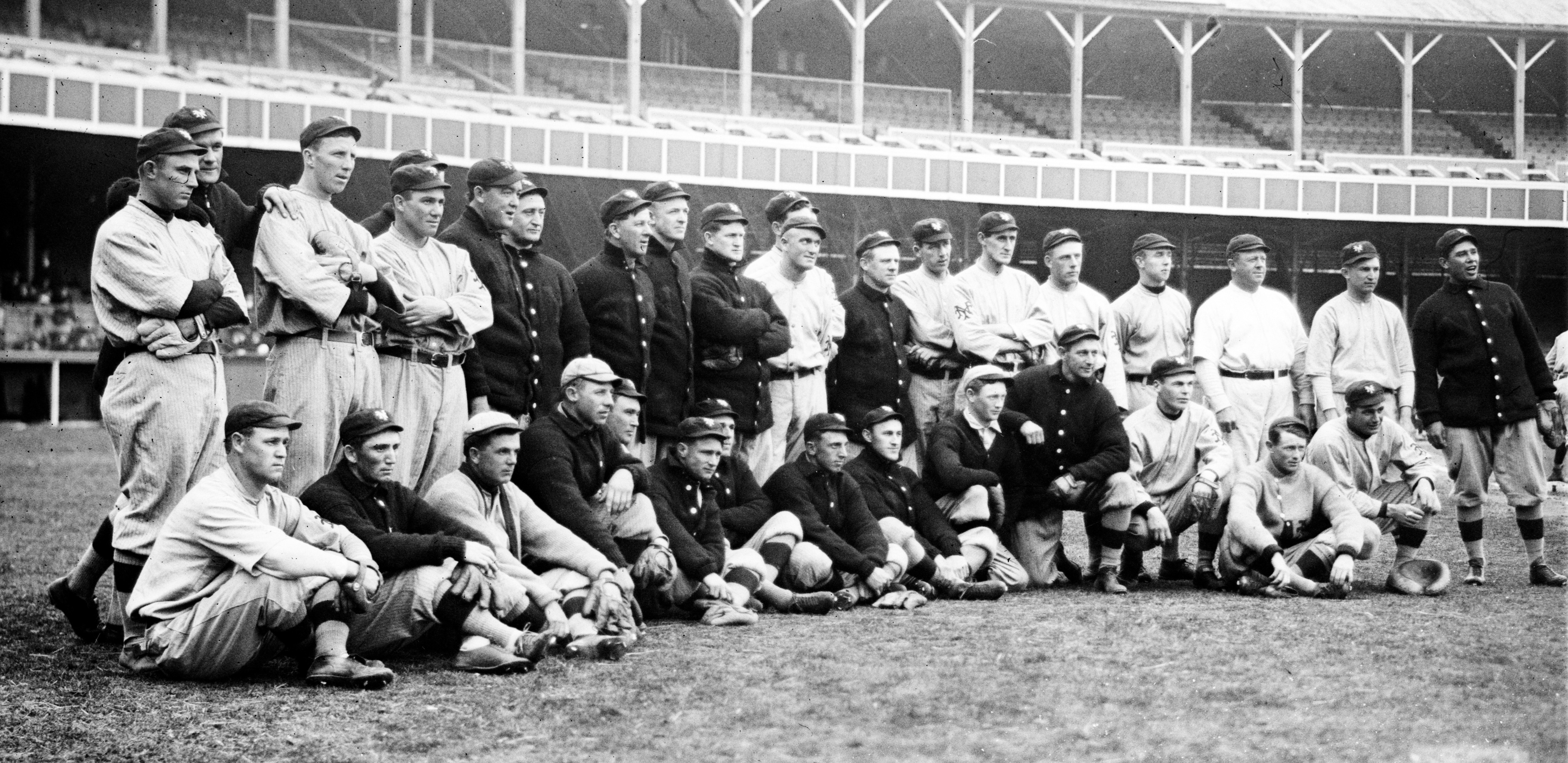
Team photo

=== Season standings ===
National League
Team	W	L	Pct.	GB	Home	Road
New York Giants	99	54	.647	—	49‍–‍25	50‍–‍29
Chicago Cubs	92	62	.597	7½	49‍–‍32	43‍–‍30
Pittsburgh Pirates	85	69	.552	14½	48‍–‍29	37‍–‍40
Philadelphia Phillies	79	73	.520	19½	42‍–‍34	37‍–‍39
St. Louis Cardinals	75	74	.503	22	36‍–‍38	39‍–‍36
Cincinnati Reds	70	83	.458	29	38‍–‍42	32‍–‍41
Brooklyn Trolley Dodgers	64	86	.427	33½	31‍–‍42	33‍–‍44
Boston Rustlers	44	107	.291	54	19‍–‍54	25‍–‍53

=== Record vs. opponents ===
1911 National League record Sources:
Team	BSN	BRO	CHC	CIN	NYG	PHI	PIT	STL
Boston	—	12–10–1	5–17	4–17–1	7–15	6–16	3–19	7–13–3
Brooklyn	10–12–1	—	13–9	11–11	5–16–1	8–13–1	14–8	9–11–1
Chicago	17–5	9–13	—	14–8–1	11–11	15–7	10–12	16–6–2
Cincinnati	17–4–1	11–11	8–14–1	—	8–14	10–12	10–12–1	6–16–3
New York	15–7	16–5–1	11–11	14–8	—	12–10	16–6	15–7
Philadelphia	16–6	13–8–1	7–15	12–10	10–12	—	13–9	8–13
Pittsburgh	19–3	14–8	12–10	12–10–1	6–16	9–13	—	13–9
St. Louis	13–7–3	11–9–1	6–16–2	16–6–3	7–15	13–8	9–13	—

=== Roster ===
1911 New York Giants
Roster
Pitchers: Red Ames; Doc Crandall; Louis Drucke; Charlie Faust; Rube Marquard; Christy Mathewson; Bert Maxwell; Bugs Raymond; Dick Rudolph; Hooks Wiltse	Catchers: Grover Hartley; Chief Meyers; Art Wilson; Infielders: Al Bridwell; Art Devlin; Larry Doyle; Art Fletcher; Hank Gowdy; Buck Herzog; Fred Merkle; Gene Paulette	Outfielders: Beals Becker; George Burns; Josh Devore; Mike Donlin; Red Murray; Fred Snodgrass; Other batters: Admiral Schlei	Manager: John McGraw; Coaches: Wilbert Robinson

=== Charlie "Victory" Faust ===
One of the Giants' drawing cards came in the form of unknown pitcher Charlie Faust, whose story was retold by Fred Snodgrass in The Glory of Their Times. Faust was considered something of a "good-luck charm" by manager McGraw, and was used sparingly. In 1911, Faust appeared in just two games for the team, which was the entirety of his major league playing career. As a pitcher, he pitched two innings, giving up one run. As a batter, he tallied one hit by pitch, two stolen bases, and one run scored, in zero at bats.

== Player stats ==
=== Batting ===
==== Starters by position ====
Note: Pos = Position; G = Games played; AB = At bats; H = Hits; Avg. = Batting average; HR = Home runs; RBI = Runs batted in

Pos	Player	G	AB	H	Avg.	HR	RBI
C	Chief Meyers	133	391	133	.332	1	61
1B	Fred Merkle	149	541	153	.283	12	84
2B	Larry Doyle	143	526	163	.310	13	77
3B	Art Devlin	95	260	71	.273	0	25
SS	Al Bridwell	76	263	71	.270	0	31
OF	Josh Devore	149	565	158	.280	3	50
OF	Fred Snodgrass	151	534	157	.294	1	77
OF	Red Murray	140	488	142	.291	3	78

==== Other batters ====
Note: G = Games played; AB = At bats; H = Hits; Avg. = Batting average; HR = Home runs; RBI = Runs batted in

Player	G	AB	H	Avg.	HR	RBI
Art Fletcher	112	326	104	.319	1	37
Buck Herzog	69	247	66	.267	1	26
Beals Becker	88	172	45	.262	1	20
Art Wilson	66	109	33	.303	1	17
Grover Hartley	11	18	4	.222	0	1
George Burns	6	17	1	.059	0	0
Mike Donlin	12	12	4	.333	1	1
Gene Paulette	10	12	2	.167	0	1
Hank Gowdy	4	4	1	.250	0	0
Admiral Schlei	1	1	0	.000	0	0

=== Pitching ===
==== Starting pitchers ====
Note: G = Games pitched; IP = Innings pitched; W = Wins; L = Losses; ERA = Earned run average; SO = Strikeouts

Player	G	IP	W	L	ERA	SO
Christy Mathewson	45	307.0	26	13	1.99	141
Rube Marquard	45	277.2	24	7	2.50	237
Red Ames	34	205.0	11	10	2.68	118
Hooks Wiltse	30	187.1	12	9	3.27	92
Bert Maxwell	4	31.0	1	2	2.90	8

==== Other pitchers ====
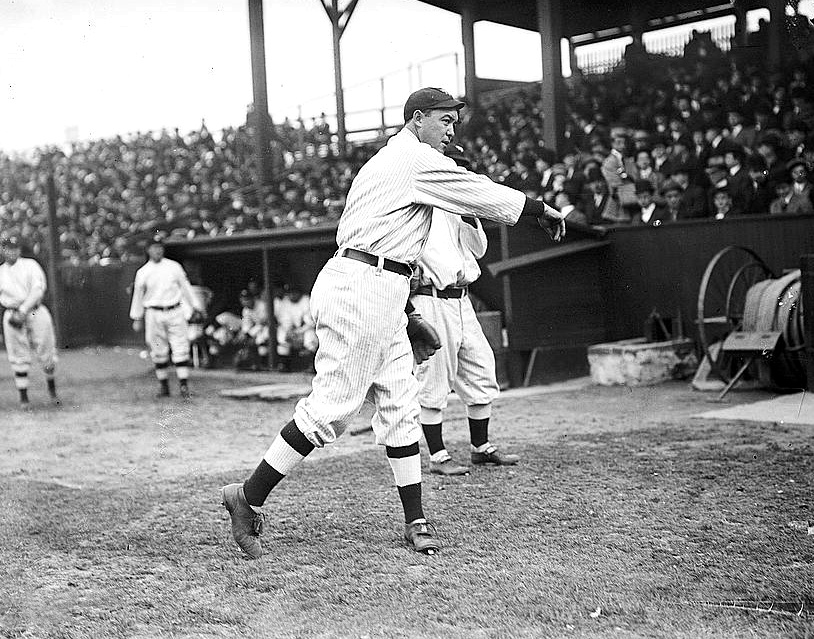
Bugs Raymond in 1911. He went 6–4 for the Giants before alcoholism led to his release. A year later, he was dead.

Note: G = Games pitched; IP = Innings pitched; W = Wins; L = Losses; ERA = Earned run average; SO = Strikeouts

Player	G	IP	W	L	ERA	SO
Doc Crandall	41	198.2	15	5	2.63	94
Bugs Raymond	17	81.2	6	4	3.31	89
Louis Drucke	15	75.2	4	4	4.04	42

==== Relief pitchers ====
Note: G = Games pitched; W = Wins; L = Losses; SV = Saves; ERA = Earned run average; SO = Strikeouts

Player	G	W	L	SV	ERA	SO
Charlie Faust	2	0	0	0	4.50	0

== 1911 World Series ==
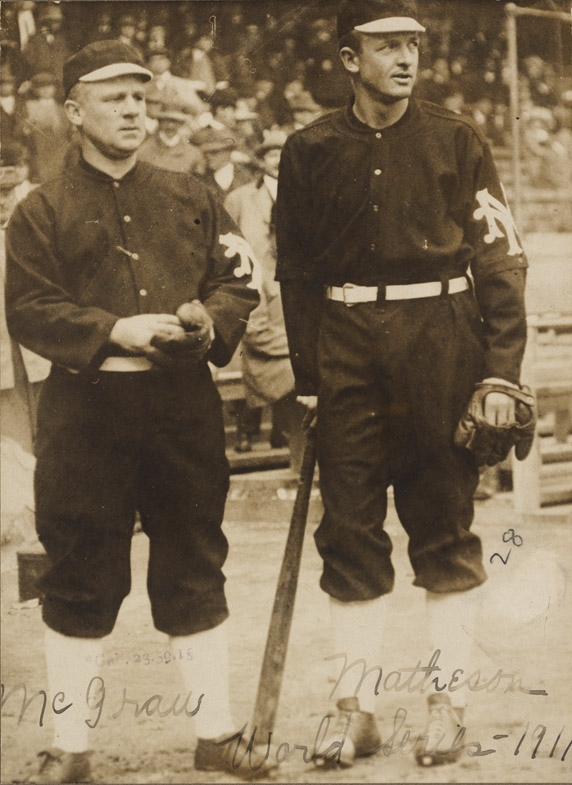
Manager John McGraw and pitcher Christy Mathewson.

=== Game 1 ===
October 14, 1911, at the Polo Grounds in New York City

Team	1	2	3	4	5	6	7	8	9	R	H	E
Philadelphia	0	1	0	0	0	0	0	0	0	1	6	2
New York	0	0	0	1	0	0	1	0	x	2	5	0
W: Christy Mathewson (1–0) L: Chief Bender (0–1)

=== Game 2 ===
October 16, 1911, at Shibe Park in Philadelphia

Team	1	2	3	4	5	6	7	8	9	R	H	E
New York	0	1	0	0	0	0	0	0	0	1	5	3
Philadelphia	1	0	0	0	0	2	0	0	x	3	4	0
W: Eddie Plank (1–0) L: Rube Marquard (0–1)
HR: PHI – Home Run Baker (1)

=== Game 3 ===
October 17, 1911, at the Polo Grounds in New York City

Team	1	2	3	4	5	6	7	8	9	10	11	R	H	E
Philadelphia	0	0	0	0	0	0	1	0	0	0	2	3	9	1
New York	0	0	1	0	0	0	0	0	0	0	1	2	3	5
W: Jack Coombs (1–0) L: Christy Mathewson (1–1)
HR: PHI – Home Run Baker (2)

=== Game 4 ===
October 24, 1911, at Shibe Park in Philadelphia

Team	1	2	3	4	5	6	7	8	9	R	H	E
New York	2	0	0	0	0	0	0	0	0	2	7	3
Philadelphia	0	0	0	3	1	0	0	0	x	4	11	1
W: Chief Bender (1–1) L: Christy Mathewson (1–2)

=== Game 5 ===
October 25, 1911, at the Polo Grounds in New York City

Team	1	2	3	4	5	6	7	8	9	10	R	H	E
Philadelphia	0	0	3	0	0	0	0	0	0	0	3	7	1
New York	0	0	1	0	0	0	1	0	2	1	4	9	2
W: Doc Crandall (1–0) L: Eddie Plank (1–1)
HR: PHI – Rube Oldring (1)

=== Game 6 ===
October 26, 1911, at Shibe Park in Philadelphia

Team	1	2	3	4	5	6	7	8	9	R	H	E
New York	1	0	0	0	0	0	0	0	1	2	4	3
Philadelphia	0	0	1	4	0	1	7	0	x	13	13	5
W: Chief Bender (2–1) L: Red Ames (0–1)
