= Herman Young =

American baseball player (1886-1966)

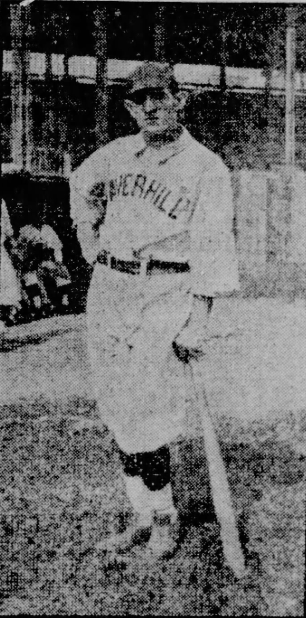
- Young with Haverhill Hustlers
- Third baseman / Shortstop
- Born: April 14, 1886; Boston, Massachusetts, U.S.
- Died: December 12, 1966 (aged 80); Ipswich, Massachusetts, U.S.
- Batted: Right Threw: Right

MLB debut
- June 11, 1911, for the Boston Rustlers

Last MLB appearance
- June 23, 1911, for the Boston Rustlers

MLB statistics
- Games played: 9
- At bats: 25
- Hits: 6
- Stats at Baseball Reference

Teams
- Boston Rustlers (1911)

Herman John Young (April 14, 1886 – December 13, 1966) was an American professional baseball player. Young played in nine games in Major League Baseball in the 1911 season with the Boston Rustlers.

== Professional career ==
Young was born in Boston, Massachusetts, on April 14, 1886. He began his professional baseball career in 1908 as a shortstop with the Holyoke Papermakers of the Connecticut League, where he put up batting averages of.350 in 1908 and .330 in 1909. After not playing baseball in 1910, he signed with the Boston Rustlers in February 1911. In March, he was invited to spring training with the team in Augusta, Georgia.

During the regular season, Young joined the Rustlers in June after Buck Herzog suffered an injury. He made his major league debut on June 11, he played in eight more games with Boston, collecting nine hits in 25 at bats. Young was used as a third baseman in five games, and as a shortstop in three games. Young played in his final game with Boston on June 23, and he was purchased by the Haverhill Hustlers of the New England League on July 22.

He played for Haverhill for the remainder of the 1911 season, and for all of 1912.

In December 1912, he was traded to the Springfield Ponies of the Eastern Association. He was traded to the Albany Senators of the New York State League in 1914. In July, he was returned to Springfield after Albany failed to make a final payment on the trade. He was then sold to the Worcester Busters of the New England League.

After resigning with Worcester in February 1915, he was released that May and signed by the Fitchburg Burghers.

Young died at the age of 80 on December 12, 1966, and was buried at Mount Hope Cemetery in Boston.
