= Ernie Ovitz =

American baseball player (1885–1980)

- Pitcher
- Born: October 7, 1885; Mineral Point, Wisconsin, U.S.
- Died: September 11, 1980 (aged 94); Green Bay, Wisconsin, U.S.
- Batted: Right Threw: Right

MLB debut
- June 22, 1911, for the Chicago Cubs

Last MLB appearance
- June 22, 1911, for the Chicago Cubs

MLB statistics
- Games played: 1
- Innings pitched: 2
- Earned run average: 4.50
- Stats at Baseball Reference

Teams
- Chicago Cubs (1911)

Ernest Gayhart Ovitz (October 7, 1885 – September 11, 1980) was an American pitcher in Major League Baseball. He played for the Chicago Cubs in 1911.
