= Gil Whitehouse =

American baseball player (1893-1926)

- Right fielder
- Born: October 15, 1893; Somerville, Massachusetts, U.S.
- Died: February 14, 1926 (aged 32); Brewer, Maine, U.S.
- Batted: Both Threw: Right

MLB debut
- June 20, 1912, for the Boston Braves

Last MLB appearance
- October 3, 1915, for the Newark Peppers

MLB statistics
- Batting average: .220
- Hits: 27
- Runs batted in: 9
- Stats at Baseball Reference

Teams
- Boston Braves (1912); Newark Peppers (1915)

Gilbert Arthur Whitehouse (October 15, 1893 – February 12, 1926) was an American Major League Baseball right fielder who played for two seasons. He played for the Boston Braves in three games during the 1912 Boston Braves season and he played for the Newark Peppers in 35 games during the 1915 season.
