= Bill Jones (outfielder) =

Canadian baseball player (1887–1946)

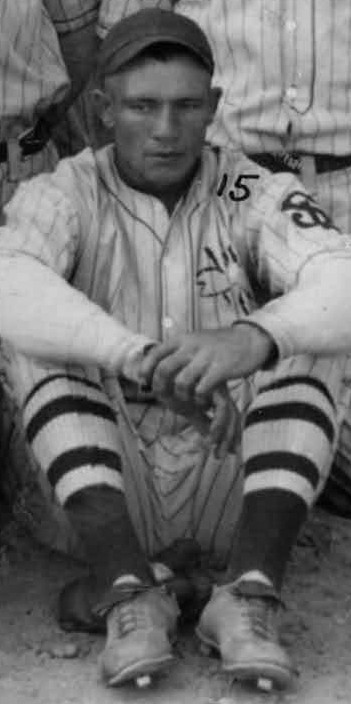
- Center fielder
- Born: April 8, 1887; Hartland, New Brunswick, Canada
- Died: October 10, 1946 (aged 59); Boston, Massachusetts, U.S.
- Batted: Left Threw: Right

MLB debut
- June 20, 1911, for the Boston Rustlers

Last MLB appearance
- June 8, 1912, for the Boston Braves

MLB statistics
- Batting average: .226
- Home runs: 0
- Runs batted in: 5
- Stats at Baseball Reference

Teams
- Boston Rustlers / Braves (1911–1912)

William Dennis "Midget" Jones (April 8, 1887 – October 10, 1946) was a Canadian Major League Baseball player. He played two seasons with the Boston Rustlers / Braves from 1911 to 1912.
