= Fuller Thompson =

American baseball player (1889-1972)

- Pitcher
- Born: June 1, 1889; Los Angeles
- Died: February 19, 1972 (aged 82); Los Angeles
- Batted: Right Threw: Right

MLB debut
- August 19, 1911, for the Boston Rustlers

Last MLB appearance
- September 7, 1911, for the Boston Rustlers

MLB statistics
- Win–loss record: 0–0
- Strikeouts: 0
- Earned run average: 3.86
- Stats at Baseball Reference

Teams
- Boston Rustlers (1911)

Fuller Weidner Thompson (June 1, 1889 – February 19, 1972) was a Major League Baseball pitcher. He played one season with the Boston Rustlers in 1911.
