= Steve White (baseball) =

American baseball player (1884–1975)

- Pitcher
- Born: December 21, 1884; Dorchester, Massachusetts, U.S.
- Died: January 29, 1975 (aged 90); Braintree, Massachusetts, U.S.
- Batted: Right Threw: Right

MLB debut
- May 29, 1912, for the Washington Senators

Last MLB appearance
- July 5, 1912, for the Boston Braves

MLB statistics
- Win–loss record: 0–0
- Earned run average: 5.40
- Strikeouts: 3
- Stats at Baseball Reference

Teams
- Washington Senators (1912); Boston Braves (1912)

Stephen Vincent White (December 21, 1884 – January 29, 1975) was an American Major League Baseball pitcher who played for one season. He played for the Washington Senators and Boston Braves for four combined games during the 1912 season.
