= Reggie Richter =

German baseball player (1888–1934)

- Pitcher
- Born: September 14, 1888; Düsseldorf, Germany
- Died: August 2, 1934 (aged 45); Winfield, Illinois, U.S.
- Batted: Right Threw: Right

MLB debut
- May 30, 1911, for the Chicago Cubs

Last MLB appearance
- September 26, 1911, for the Chicago Cubs

MLB statistics
- Win–loss record: 1–3
- ERA: 3.13
- Strikeouts: 34
- Stats at Baseball Reference

Teams
- Chicago Cubs (1911)

Emil Henry "Reggie" Richter (September 14, 1888 – August 2, 1934) was a German born Major League Baseball pitcher who played for the Chicago Cubs in 1911.
