= Art Schwind =

American baseball player (1889–1968)

- Third baseman
- Born: November 4, 1889; Fort Wayne, Indiana, U.S.
- Died: January 13, 1968 (aged 78); Sullivan, Illinois, U.S.
- Batted: Both Threw: Right

MLB debut
- October 3, 1912, for the Boston Braves

Last MLB appearance
- October 3, 1912, for the Boston Braves

MLB statistics
- Batting average: .500
- Home runs: 0
- Runs batted in: 0
- Stats at Baseball Reference

Teams
- Boston Braves (1912)

Arthur Edwin Schwind (November 4, 1889 – January 13, 1968) was an American Major League Baseball player. He played one game with the Boston Braves on October 3, 1912.
