= Ed Donnelly (1910s pitcher) =

American baseball player (1879-1957)

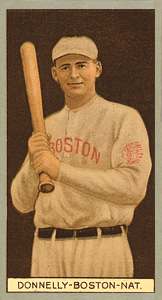
- Pitcher
- Born: July 29, 1879; Hampton, New York
- Died: November 28, 1957 (aged 78); Rutland, Vermont
- Batted: Right Threw: Right

MLB debut
- September 19, 1911, for the Boston Rustlers

Last MLB appearance
- October 3, 1912, for the Boston Braves

MLB statistics
- Win–loss record: 8–12
- Earned run average: 4.03
- Strikeouts: 83
- Stats at Baseball Reference

Teams
- Boston Rustlers/Braves (1911–1912)

Edward Donnelly (July 29, 1879 – November 28, 1957) was an American pitcher in Major League Baseball who played from 1911 to 1912 for the Boston Rustlers / Braves.
