= Bill Brady (baseball) =

American baseball player (1889-1956)

- Relief pitcher
- Born: August 18, 1889; New York City
- Died: April 10, 1956 (aged 66); Brooklyn, New York
- Batted: Right Threw: Right

MLB debut
- July 9, 1912, for the Boston Braves

Last MLB appearance
- July 9, 1912, for the Boston Braves

MLB statistics
- Win–loss record: 0–0
- Strikeouts: 0
- Earned run average: 0.00
- Stats at Baseball Reference

Teams
- Boston Braves (1912)

William Aloysius "King" Brady (August 18, 1889 – April 10, 1956) was a former Major League Baseball pitcher. He played one game with the Boston Braves on July 9, 1912, giving up two hits and throwing for one scoreless inning to end the game.
