= Cliff Curtis (baseball) =

American baseball player (1881–1943)

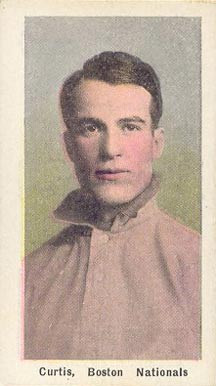
- Pitcher
- Born: July 3, 1881; Delaware, Ohio, U.S.
- Died: April 23, 1943 (aged 61); Utica, Ohio, U.S.
- Batted: Right Threw: Right

MLB debut
- August 23, 1909, for the Boston Doves

Last MLB appearance
- August 16, 1913, for the Brooklyn Dodgers

MLB statistics
- Win–loss record: 28–61
- Earned run average: 3.31
- Strikeouts: 236
- Stats at Baseball Reference

Teams
- Boston Doves/Rustlers (1909–1911); Chicago Cubs (1911); Philadelphia Phillies (1911–1912); Brooklyn Dodgers (1912–1913)

Clifton Garfield Curtis (July 3, 1881 – April 23, 1943) was an American pitcher in Major League Baseball. His middle name, Garfield, is assumed to derive from that of U.S. president and fellow Ohio native James A. Garfield, who was fatally shot the day before Curtis was born.

Curtis had an extensive minor league pitching career, winning 151 games in the minors between 1902 and 1918. His largest stint was with the Milwaukee Brewers. He pitched for them for six full seasons from 1904 to 1909, and in his first season won 24 games for the Brewers. His Major League career lasted from 1909 to 1913, though he never had a winning season.

While pitching for the last-place Boston Doves (later known as the Rustlers, and later still as the Braves) in 1910 and 1911, Curtis set a record of 23 consecutive losses. The record was eventually broken in 1993, when New York Mets pitcher Anthony Young lost 27 consecutive games in which he had a decision.

During his lengthy losing streak, Curtis also failed to pick up a win in 28 consecutive starts, which also established a Major League record. This record was tied by Matt Keough (1978–79) and Jo-Jo Reyes (2008–2011).

He died from a heart attack aged 61.
