= Johnny Kling =

American baseball player and manager (1875–1947)

- Catcher / Manager
- Born: November 13, 1875; Kansas City, Missouri, U.S.
- Died: January 31, 1947 (aged 71); Kansas City, Missouri, U.S.
- Batted: Right Threw: Right

MLB debut
- September 11, 1900, for the Chicago Orphans

Last MLB appearance
- September 21, 1913, for the Cincinnati Reds

MLB statistics
- Batting average: .272
- Home runs: 20
- Runs batted in: 514
- Managerial record: 52–101
- Winning %: .340
- Stats at Baseball Reference

Teams
- As player: Chicago Orphans / Cubs (1900–1908, 1910–1911); Boston Braves / Rustlers (1911–1912); Cincinnati Reds (1913); As manager: Boston Braves (1912)

Career highlights and awards
- 2× World Series champion (1907, 1908)

John Gransfield Kling (November 13, 1875 – January 31, 1947) was an American professional baseball player and manager. He played in Major League Baseball as a catcher from 1900 to 1913, most prominently as a member of the Chicago Cubs teams that won four National League pennants and two World Series championships between 1907 and 1910. He also played for the Boston Braves / Rustlers and the Cincinnati Reds.

== Early years ==
Kling was born and raised in Kansas City, Missouri, the son of John (a German-American baker) and Caroline Kling. It was expected that he would work in the bakery business, as his brother Charles seems to have done, but Johnny fell in love with baseball. By the age of fifteen, he was playing amateur ball. He also had an interest in pool, and began playing competitively even as he pursued a baseball career ("Match Game of Pool", 1897, 3). In late January 1904, Kling married Lillian May Gradwohl. Whether Kling was born Jewish is a matter of dispute, but his wife was, and they were married by a Kansas City Rabbi Harry H. Mayer, of Temple B'nai Jehudah, a Reform congregation.

== In the major leagues ==
After playing amateur and semi-pro baseball, Kling finally made his major league debut on September 11, 1900, playing for the Chicago Orphans of the National League. He got three hits, and made a positive impression both as a catcher and as a hitter. For what was left of the season, he caught fifteen games and had a batting average of .294. He also acquired the nickname "Noisy John", because he kept up a constant chatter on the field; some baseball historians have noted this was part of his skill in waging "psychological warfare" on his opponents. By all accounts he was an exceptional defensive catcher, praised for his skill in throwing out runners who were caught stealing. He was also a reliable hitter, and a pivotal member of the team that became known as the Chicago Cubs, an integral part of the dynasty, which included Hall of Fame infielders Joe Tinker, Johnny Evers and Frank Chance. Between 1906 and 1910, the Cubs won four National League pennants and two World Series titles, and Kling was said to be one of the reasons why. And, unlike many ballplayers of his day, he didn't smoke, drink or chew tobacco. Staying in good shape as a result was said to contribute to his baseball success.

Overall, he played in 1,261 major league games, batting .272 with 20 home runs and 514 RBIs in his major-league career. He had 1,154 hits in 4,246 at bats and scored 475 runs. In August 1902, he amassed a Major League Baseball record streak of 12 consecutive hits. Walt Dropo later tied the mark in 1952. He caught 115 shutouts during his career, ranking him 16th all-time among major-league catchers.

== Pool vs. Baseball ==
While he loved baseball, Kling never lost his devotion to the game of pool. In 1902, for example, one reporter called him the best pool player of any active baseball player. He often played for purses as high as $300, a sizable amount in that era. During this time, he also ran his own billiard room in his native Kansas City. During the early 1900s, his pool-playing career was regarded positively by sports reporters—in one article, he was praised as a baseball player who was not idle during the off-season; he was said to have "double[d] his diamond income" by being an accomplished pool player. His skill at pool also served him well when it came time to negotiate his baseball salary. Before the 1906 season he announced that he would not sign a new contract unless Chicago offered him a raise in pay, and if the raise was not forthcoming he would stay home and play pool. This angered his manager, Frank Chance, who snapped that everyone else but Kling had come to terms with the club. He subsequently did decide to play, raise or not. He had another impressive season, catching 96 games and hitting over .300 for the record 116-36 pennant winners.

Although he once again told Cubs' management he was considering giving up baseball for pool before the 1907 season, he once again returned to play for the Cubs, who won the World Series in both 1907 and 1908. Then, in early 1909, after several solid years with Chicago, he engaged in another dispute with the management over salary and this time decided to spend some time away from the club. During that time he continued to compete in pool, winning the world billiards championship, and played semi-pro baseball with a Kansas City team. He sat out the entire 1909 season, and in early October competed against Charles "Cowboy" Weston and won the world's championship of pool. When he decided to come back to baseball in early 1910 and asked to be reinstated, a debate ensued as to whether he should be permitted to return since he had not honored his contract during the 1909 season. National League President Thomas J. Lynch wanted him fined or possibly traded; in the end, he was fined $700 and allowed to return. His love for both pool and billiards led him to not only play competitively, but to organize a league which was called the National Amateur Three-Cushion League. It had teams from eight cities, Kansas City, Chicago and St. Louis among them. He told reporters that when his baseball career was over, he would devote himself to pool and billiards full-time. And despite his often-divided loyalties, baseball writers agreed that Kling was among the best players of his era; in fact, his obituary described him as "one of the greatest catchers the Chicago Cubs ever had".

== Final years ==
After a decade of success with the Cubs, Kling was traded to the lowly Boston Braves, where he spent the 1911 and 1912 seasons. At one point he even managed the Braves, but his managerial efforts were not successful and the team had a losing record. He was said to be unhappy with the way the Braves' owners made him run the team, and this led to his being traded in 1913. His final year in the majors was spent with the Cincinnati Reds. He devoted the rest of his life to several important pursuits. He owned the Dixon Hotel in Kansas City, where his billiard parlor gained national recognition. During his baseball career, he had begun mentoring his nephew, Bennie Allen, and as the years passed, Bennie went on to become a champion too. In 1933, he purchased the Kansas City Blues of the American Association and was able to generate more interest in the team and increase their attendance within a year of taking over. One of his innovations was to desegregate the ballpark, allowing both black and white fans to attend the games together. Kling sold the Blues in 1937.

Though never a major name among Hall of Fame rooters, Kling garnered his share of support for Cooperstown. He received votes from the BBWAA in eight elections, earning as much as 10% of the vote (in 1937).

In late January 1947, while returning from Miami to Kansas City, he suffered either a heart attack or a cerebral hemorrhage and died in the hospital at age 71. He was survived by his wife and two daughters.

== Debate of Jewish heritage ==
Speculation about whether Kling was Jewish has persisted over the years. One source says he used the name "Kline" early in his career, a surname that is sometimes (but not always) Jewish. And although he was married to a Jewish woman in a ceremony conducted by a Reform Jewish rabbi, there are questions that have never been fully resolved. The major Jewish newspapers never questioned Kling's Jewishness: writers and reporters frequently referred to him as Jewish, in articles from the 1920s through the 1970s. The Boston Jewish Advocate was among those that asserted his real name was John Kline, and said he had even played baseball under that name; one writer said he was "the first of the Jewish [baseball] pioneers" (Harold U. Ribalow, "Johnny Kling Showed the Way", Jewish Advocate, 12 April 1951, p. 22). But even earlier, the story of Kling's Jewishness was given a vote of confidence by New York Giants owner-manager John McGraw, who knew Kling and referred to him as a Jewish ballplayer in a 1923 article, "Jewish Baseball Players Wanted" (American Israelite, 9 August 1923, p. 6). Among contemporary authors who believe he was Jewish is Dr. Gil Bogen, who wrote a book about Kling's life. But some researchers dispute this, and years after his death, his widow Lillian, who was definitely Jewish, seemed to deny that her husband was ever Jewish.

== See also ==
- List of Major League Baseball player–managers
