= Bill McTigue =

American baseball player (1891–1920)

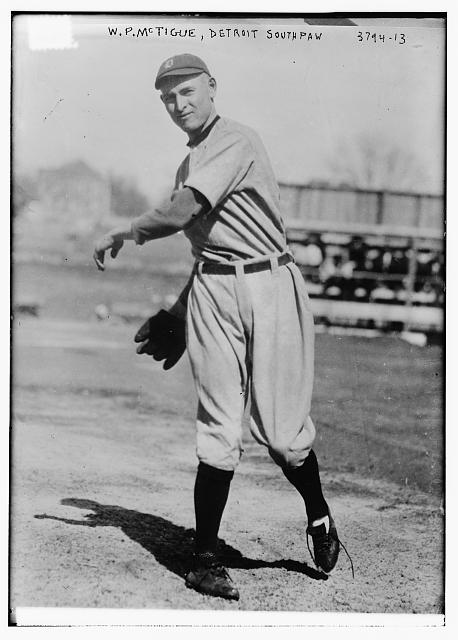
- Pitcher
- Born: June 3, 1891; Nashville, Tennessee, U.S.
- Died: May 8, 1920 (aged 28); Nashville, Tennessee, U.S.
- Batted: Left Threw: Left

MLB debut
- May 2, 1911, for the Boston Rustlers

Last MLB appearance
- May 5, 1916, for the Detroit Tigers

MLB statistics
- Win–loss record: 2–5
- Earned run average: 6.19
- Strikeouts: 41
- Stats at Baseball Reference

Teams
- Boston Rustlers / Braves (1911–1912); Detroit Tigers (1916)

William Patrick "Rebel" McTigue (June 3, 1891 – May 8, 1920) was an American pitcher in Major League Baseball. He played two seasons with the Boston Rustlers / Braves from 1911 to 1912 and one season with the Detroit Tigers in 1916. On August 23, 1918, it was reported that McTigue had a terminal lung disease and he had only days to live. He died over 20 months later on May 8, 1920.
