= Ed McDonald (baseball) =

American baseball player (1886–1946)

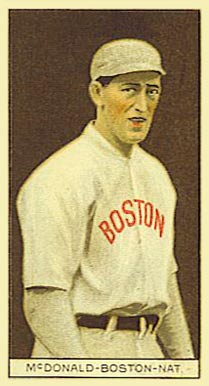
- Third baseman
- Born: October 28, 1886; Albany, New York, U.S.
- Died: March 11, 1946 (aged 59); Albany, New York, U.S.
- Batted: Right Threw: Right

MLB debut
- August 5, 1911, for the Boston Rustlers

Last MLB appearance
- April 15, 1913, for the Chicago Cubs

MLB statistics
- Batting average: .244
- Home runs: 3
- Runs batted in: 54
- Stats at Baseball Reference

Teams
- Boston Rustlers/Braves (1911–1912); Chicago Cubs (1913)

Edward Cyril McDonald (October 28, 1886 – March 11, 1946) was an American professional baseball player. He was a third baseman over parts of three seasons (1911–13) with the Boston Rustlers/Braves and Chicago Cubs. For his career, he compiled a .244 batting average, with three home runs and 54 runs batted in.

He was born and later died in Albany, New York at the age of 59.
