= Brad Hogg (baseball) =

American baseball player (1889–1935)

Carter Bradley Hogg
- Pitcher
- Born: March 26, 1889; Buena Vista, Georgia, U.S.
- Died: April 2, 1935 (aged 46); Buena Vista, Georgia, U.S.
- Batted: Right Threw: Right

MLB debut
- September 1, 1911, for the Boston Rustlers

Last MLB appearance
- September 27, 1919, for the Philadelphia Phillies

MLB statistics
- Win–loss record: 20–29
- Earned run average: 3.70
- Strikeouts: 149
- Stats at Baseball Reference

Teams
- Boston Rustlers/Braves (1911–1912); Chicago Cubs (1915); Philadelphia Phillies (1918–1919)

Carter Bradley Hogg (March 26, 1889 – April 2, 1935) was an American baseball player who played pitcher in the Major Leagues from 1911 to 1919. Hogg played for the Boston Braves, Chicago Cubs, and Philadelphia Phillies. Hoff attended Mercer University.

As a hitter, Hogg was a better than average hitting pitcher in his major league career, posting a .247 batting average (40-for-162) with 10 RBI in 84 games, 13 of them as a pinch hitter. Defensively, he was strong, recording a .986 fielding percentage with only 2 errors in 142 total chances covering 448 innings pitched.
