= Buck Herzog =

American baseball player and manager (1885–1953)

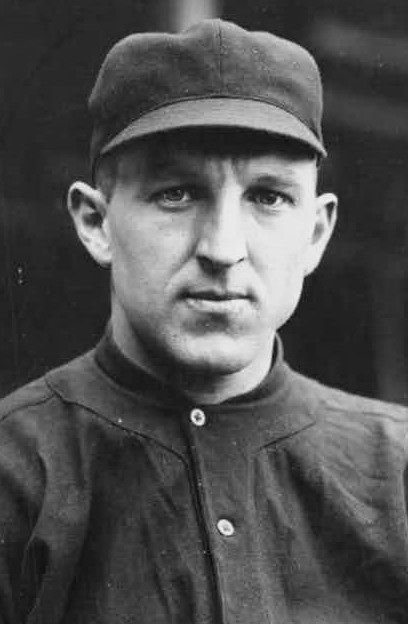
- Infielder / Manager
- Born: July 9, 1885; Baltimore, Maryland, U.S.
- Died: September 4, 1953 (aged 68); Baltimore, Maryland, U.S.
- Batted: Right Threw: Right

MLB debut
- April 17, 1908, for the New York Giants

Last MLB appearance
- September 9, 1920, for the Chicago Cubs

MLB statistics
- Batting average: .259
- Home runs: 20
- Runs batted in: 449
- Stolen bases: 320
- Managerial record: 165–226–10
- Winning %: .422
- Stats at Baseball Reference

Teams
- As player: New York Giants (1908–1909); Boston Doves / Rustlers (1910–1911); New York Giants (1911–1913); Cincinnati Reds (1914–1916); New York Giants (1916–1917); Boston Braves (1918–1919); Chicago Cubs (1919–1920); As manager: Cincinnati Reds (1914–1916)

Charles Lincoln "Buck" Herzog (July 9, 1885 – September 4, 1953) was an American infielder and manager in Major League Baseball who played for four National League clubs between 1908 and 1920: the New York Giants, the Boston Braves, the Cincinnati Reds, and the Chicago Cubs. His flexibility sets him apart from other major leaguers, as he demonstrated great skill as a second baseman, shortstop, and third baseman.

Born in Baltimore, Maryland, Herzog grew up on a farm in nearby Ridgely. After attending the Maryland Agricultural College, he played one season in the minor leagues before the Giants selected him in the Rule 5 Draft. Herzog batted .300 as a rookie but struggled in 1909 and was traded to Boston before 1910. He cemented himself as an everyday player over the next two years, then was reacquired by the Giants in 1911, with whom he would reach three straight World Series. He struggled to hit in the 1911 World Series but set a record that would stand for over 50 years with 12 hits in the 1912 World Series, though the Giants lost all three of the series. Traded to the Reds before the 1914 season, he served as a player-manager for the Reds through the first half of the 1916 season, though the team had a losing record in each of those years. The Giants reacquired him halfway through 1916, naming him the team captain. After a famous fight with Ty Cobb during 1917 spring training, he played in his fourth and final World Series, though he made a key error in Game 5 as the Giants were defeated in six games. Herzog spent 1918 with Boston, was traded to Chicago in the middle of 1919, and played one last year with the Cubs in 1920, a season that saw his reputation tarnished by unsubstantiated accusations of gambling on baseball games.

Following his playing career, Herzog managed the minor league Easton Farmers and coached the United States Naval Academy baseball team. Then, he worked for the Baltimore and Ohio Railroad and later at a race track. Penniless by the early 1950s, he died of tuberculosis in 1953.

== Early life ==
Charles Lincoln "Buck" Herzog was born on July 9, 1885, in Baltimore, Maryland. He was the descendant of German Presbyterians, though his facial features and last name would later cause people to think he was Jewish. During his childhood, his family moved to a farm in Ridgely, Maryland, where Herzog would spend much of his formative years. He attended the Maryland Agricultural College, where he played shortstop on the school's baseball team. He was a teammate of third baseman Home Run Baker, who would later be elected to the Baseball Hall of Fame.

== Professional career ==
=== Minor leagues (1907) ===
Herzog began his professional career in 1907 when he joined the York White Roses of the Class B Tri-State League. Popular with their local fans, they nonetheless wound up moving to Reading, Pennsylvania, during the year. Herzog spent the whole season with the club, his strong play at shortstop and third base starting to build his reputation for versatility. In 120 games (431 at bats), he batted a mere .204, with 88 hits, 20 doubles, eight triples, and six home runs.

=== New York Giants (first stint) (1908–1909) ===
On September 1, 1907, the New York Giants selected Herzog in the Rule 5 Draft. He got along well with manager John McGraw the next March and made the team out of spring training. Making his major league debut on April 17, 1908, against the Philadelphia Phillies, Herzog played shortstop for part of the game, recording a hit in his only at bat and scoring a run in the team's 14–2 victory. During the year, Herzog displayed "good form" according to McGraw, though there was still a "lot to learn" for the player. In 64 games, he batted .300 with 38 runs scored, 48 hits, six doubles, two triples, no home runs, 11 runs batted in (RBI), and 16 stolen bases. He played 42 games as a second baseman, 12 as a shortstop, four as a third baseman, and one as an outfielder.

Herzog took what baseball historian Frank Russo called "a gigantic step back" in 1909, as he struggled to hit all season. Not used much, he constantly pestered McGraw for more playing time, which irritated his manager. In 42 games (130 at bats), he batted .185 with 16 runs scored and 24 hits, only two of which, both doubles, went for extra bases. He also had eight RBI, and despite the limited playing time, he stole 10 bases.

=== Boston Doves/Rustlers (first stint) (1910–1911) ===
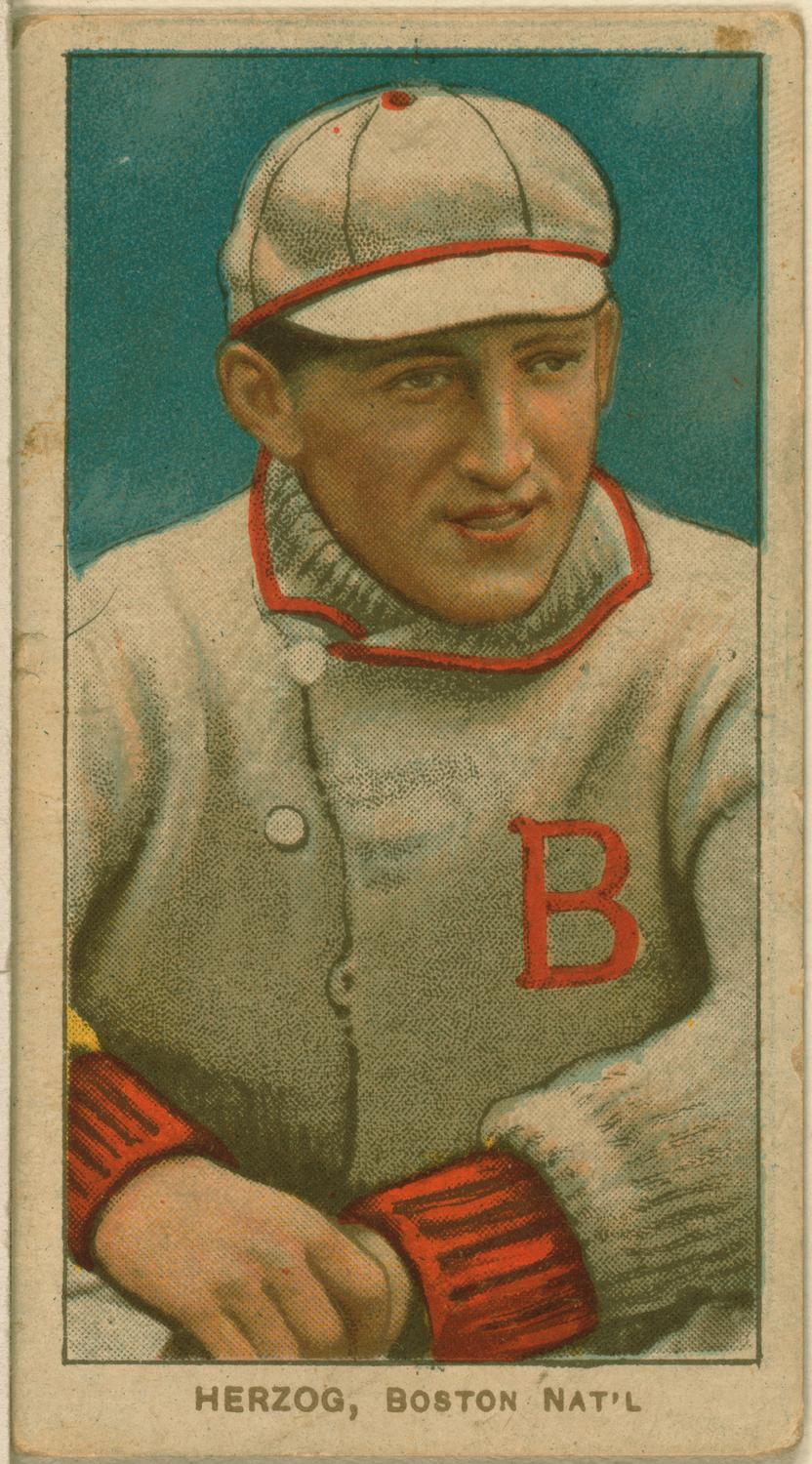
T206 card of Herzog with Boston, circa 1910–11

Although Herzog spent spring training with the Giants in 1910, McGraw was tired of listening to him begging for playing time. On April 4, the Giants traded him and Bill Collins to the Boston Doves in exchange for Beals Becker. Now in his third season, he finally hit his first major league home run on May 9 against Vic Willis, the only run of the game for Boston as the St. Louis Cardinals defeated them 2–1. With the Doves, Herzog received regular playing time. He was the starting third baseman until July 6, after which he was suspended for insubordination. Seeking to replace Fred Lake as the team's manager, Herzog phoned McGraw and asked whether he should accept an offer for a two-year, $5,000 contract to manage Boston. McGraw felt this was underhanded and tipped Lake off as to what was going on. Braves vice president John Harris told Lake to handle the situation how he thought best, and Lake suspended Herzog.

Returning to action August 2, Herzog resumed the everyday third base job. In 106 games (380 at bats), he batted .250 with 51 runs scored, 95 hits, 20 doubles, three triples, three home runs, 32 RBI, and 13 stolen bases.

Herzog returned to the Boston club, now known as the Rustlers, for the 1911 season. This time the primary shortstop, Herzog got off to a strong start to the season, leading the team in hitting with a .310 average through July 15. Nevertheless, he got in trouble with manager Fred Tenney, who fined both Herzog and teammate Doc Miller for "laying down" during games. This led Herzog to go on strike for three games from July 16 through 18, and though he returned to the lineup on July 19, he was traded to the Giants on July 22 for Al Bridwell and Hank Gowdy. In 79 games (356 at bats) for the Rustlers, he had recorded 53 runs scored, 91 hits, 19 doubles, five triples, five home runs, 41 RBI, and 26 stolen bases.

=== New York Giants (second stint) (1911–1913) ===
Though Herzog and McGraw had parted ways uncomfortably last time, the Giants' manager made it clear upon Herzog's return that all he cared about was winning the pennant, and he was willing to overlook any dislike he might have for the infielder. Herzog assumed the third base job, bringing a great deal of energy to the position as the Giants won the NL pennant by five games. In 69 games (247 at bats) for New York, Herzog batted .267 with 37 runs scored, 66 hits, 14 doubles, four triples, one home run, 26 RBI, and 22 stolen bases. His combined totals between Boston and New York were a .290 average, 90 runs scored, 157 hits, nine triples, six home runs, and 67 RBI. Herzog's 33 doubles tied with Bill Sweeney for fourth in the NL, and his 48 stolen bases tied with Red Murray for fifth. Facing the Philadelphia Athletics in the World Series, the Giants struggled to hit, and Herzog was no exception. He batted only .190 as the Giants were defeated in six games.

In 1912, Herzog remained New York's primary third baseman, used exclusively at the position. Contemporary sportswriter Ring Lardner said he "was more peppery than Captain [Larry] Doyle himself and looked like an electric battery compared with [Art] Fletcher and [Fred] Merkle. He played rings around any other man on the rival infields. He is a human illustration of the value of energy and application." In 140 games (482 at bats), he batted .263 with 72 runs scored, 127 hits, 20 doubles, nine triples, two home runs, and 51 RBI. He stole 37 bases, tied with Merkle for fifth in the NL. In fact, five of the top 10 base stealers in the league were Giants.

The Giants won the pennant again, facing the Boston Red Sox in the World Series. In Game 2, Herzog had three hits and three RBI in a game that ended in a 6–6 tie when it became too dark to play. He just missed a home run in the second inning when a hit to deep right field bounced and hit a railing on the top of the fence. Under the rules of the time, the hit would have been a home run had the ball bounced into the stands. At the beginning of the 11th inning, Tris Speaker accused Herzog of blocking his progress on the base paths in the previous inning. The two argued and had to be dragged apart by teammates. Herzog's leadoff double in the fifth inning of Game 3 led to him scoring the Giants' second run in an eventual 2–1 victory. Herzog batted .400 and set a record with 12 hits in the series, though the Giants were defeated in eight games. His record would last until 1964, when Bobby Richardson had 13 hits against the Pittsburgh Pirates.

Injured early in the 1913 season, Herzog played sparingly in June and platooned at third base with Tillie Shafer for the rest of the season. His batting average was as high as .300 on July 4, and he batted .286 for the season. In 96 games (290 at bats), he recorded 46 runs scored, 83 hits, 15 doubles, three triples, three home runs, 31 RBI, and 23 stolen bases. For the second time in three years, the Giants faced Philadelphia in the World Series. Again, the team struggled offensively; Herzog had only one hit in 19 at bats as the Giants were defeated in five games. He insisted that, come 1914, he would play better than ever.

On December 12, 1913, the Giants traded Herzog and Grover Hartley to the Cincinnati Reds for Bob Bescher. Giants owner Harry Hempstead supervised the deal, thinking that McGraw, who was on an international vacation, would be thrilled to get the speedy Bescher. Instead, McGraw rebuked Hempstead upon learning of the deal, informing the owner, "I'll do the thinking around here. The next time a deal is made on this ball club, I'll make it."

=== Cincinnati Reds (1914–1916) ===
Around the same time as they acquired Herzog, the Reds traded Joe Tinker, who had managed them the previous season. Herzog was delighted to be named the replacement, assuming player-manager duties. Jimmy Sheckard, who retired after the 1913 season, warned that the ballclub would be difficult to manage. "The new manager will have to get rid of the 'knockers' on that club before he can hope to succeed. There is no chance to win with players who think more of their own records than they do of the success of the club." Herzog butted heads with both the players and the front office. On the field, he moved back over to shortstop, playing 138 games in 1914. Only hitting .200 over his first 16 games, Herzog batted .316 thereafter, raising his average to .316 by June 16. His lone home run of the season came against Dan Griner on May 8, when he had two RBI in a 3–0 victory over the Cardinals. In 138 games, he batted .281 with 54 runs scored, 140 hits, 14 doubles, eight triples, and 40 RBI. His 46 stolen bases were topped in the NL only by George Burns's 62. Cincinnati did not do so well, finishing last in the NL with a 60–94 record.

Herzog again played primarily shortstop in 1915. He recorded his only home run of the season on May 1, in a 9–5 loss to the Cardinals. From July 4 through July 6, he played six games, as the Reds had a doubleheader scheduled on each of those dates. Herzog had three hits in the first game of each of the doubleheaders, though he had 14 innings to do so in the July 6 one. In 155 games (579 at bats), he batted .264 with 61 runs scored, 153 hits, one home run, and 42 RBI. For the second year in a row, he was second in the NL in stolen bases, as his 35 were topped only by Max Carey's 36. With a 71–83 record, the Reds finished seventh in the NL this year, with the Giants the only team that was worse than them.

The Reds again got off to a poor start in 1916, going 34–49 in their first 83 games under Herzog. Meanwhile, the Giants were again interested in his services. McGraw sent a telegram to Reds president Garry Herrmann, offering to journey personally to Cincinnati to make a trade for his ex-player. On July 20, the Giants acquired Herzog for the third time, sending future Hall of Famers Christy Mathewson, Bill McKechnie, and Edd Roush to the Reds along with $40,000 for Herzog and Bill Killefer. In 79 games (281 at bats) with the Reds, Herzog had hit .267 with 30 runs scored, 75 hits, one home run, 24 RBI, and 15 stolen bases. Under Herzog's managing, the Reds had gone 165–226 in three seasons, with 10 ties as well.

=== New York Giants (third stint) (1916–1917) ===
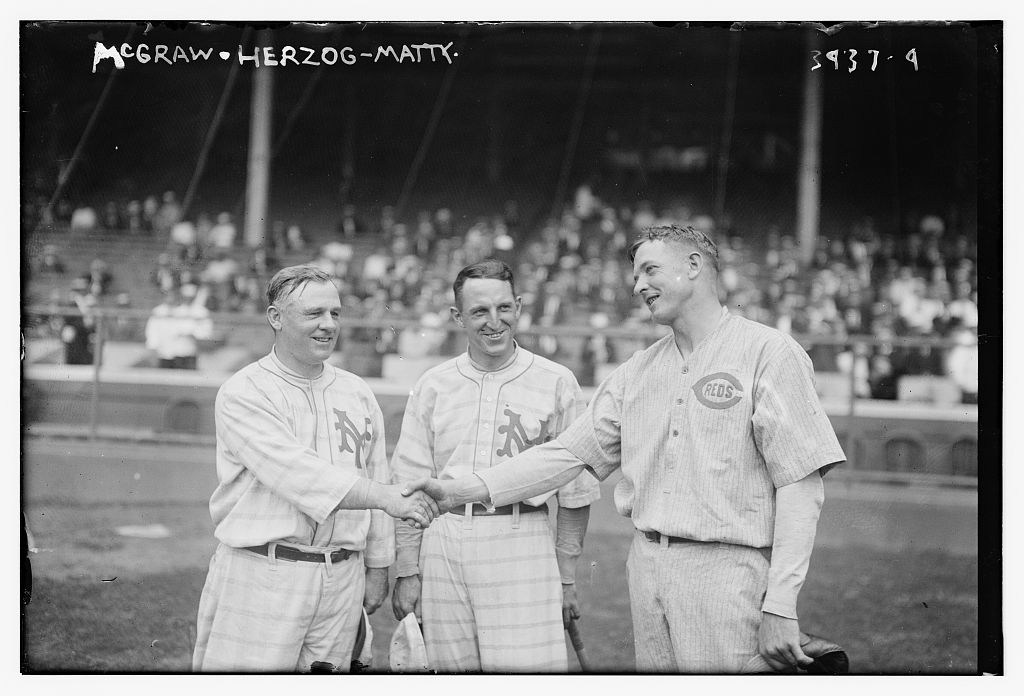
Herzog (middle) looks on as Mathewson (right, the player he was traded for) shakes hands with McGraw (left).

Herzog was used primarily at second base upon rejoining the Giants. Though not used as manager in New York, Herzog became the team captain by McGraw's choice. After he rejoined the ballclub, the Giants set a record by winning 26 games in a row. In 77 games (280 at bats) with the Giants, Herzog batted .261 with 40 runs scored, 73 hits, zero home runs, 25 RBI, and 19 stolen bases. His combined totals between Cincinnati and New York were a .264 average, 70 runs scored, 148 hits, one home run, and 49 RBI. He ranked fifth in the NL with 34 stolen bases but led the league in times caught stealing with 28. Herzog set an unusual record by playing 98 home games in one season: 50 of his 79 games for the Reds were at home, and 48 of his 77 with the Giants were at home.

During 1917 spring training, Herzog had his most famous fight when he battled Ty Cobb. After the Tiger outfielder showed up late for a Dallas spring training doubleheader because of a golf outing, Herzog and several of his teammates called him names from the Giant bench. Cobb retaliated by sliding into Herzog feetfirst and making contact with his spikes during the second game, prompting a bench-clearing brawl in which Cobb shoved Herzog's face into the dirt. The Dallas Police Department had to help stop the brawl, and Cobb was thrown out of the game. Both teams were staying at the Oriental Hotel, and at dinner that evening, Herzog walked up to Cobb and challenged him to a fight. The two met an hour later in Cobb's room, where the Tiger outfielder had prepared for the fight by moving furniture out of the way and pouring water on the floor. Cobb's leather-soled shoes enabled him to get better footing than Herzog, who wore tennis shoes. The fight lasted for 30 minutes, over the course of which Cobb knocked down Herzog about six times while Herzog only knocked Cobb down once. The scuffle left Herzog's face bloodied and his eyes nearly shut. "I got hell kicked out of me, but I knocked the bum down, and you know that swell head, he’ll never get over the fact that a little guy like me had him on the floor," Herzog declared afterwards. With McGraw vowing revenge, Cobb skipped the rest of the exhibition series against the Giants, heading to Cincinnati to train with the Reds, who were managed by Cobb's friend Mathewson. However, Cobb later expressed the deepest respect for Herzog because of the way the infielder had conducted himself in the fight.

The Giants' second baseman once again, Herzog had a "statistically subpar" season, according to biographer Gabriel Schechter. In 114 games (417 at bats), he batted .235 with 69 runs scored, 98 hits, two home runs, and 31 RBI. His 12 stolen bases were the least by him in a season since 1909. However, the ballclub had another successful season, winning the NL pennant and facing the Chicago White Sox in the 1917 World Series. Playing all six of the games, Herzog batted .250 with one triple and two RBI. With the series tied at two games apiece, the Giants held a 5–2 lead entering the seventh inning of Game 5, but the White Sox scored two runs and had runners on first and third with two outs. Both of them attempted to steal a base, and catcher Bill Rariden threw to pitcher Slim Sallee, who threw to Herzog. The infielder missed the ball, and his error allowed the tying run to score. The White Sox went on to win Games 5 and 6 to clinch the series victory. Falling out of favor with McGraw again after the blunder, Herzog was traded back to the Boston NL team (now known as the Braves) on January 8, 1918, for Doyle and Jesse Barnes.

=== Boston Braves (second stint) (1918–1919) ===
In 1918, Herzog's primary position was at second base, though he also saw significant time at first base. His batting average was a low .228 in 118 games (473 at bats), as he recorded 57 runs scored, 108 hits, no home runs, 26 RBI, and 10 stolen bases. In 1919, he was used at second base with Boston once again until he was traded to the Chicago Cubs on August 2 for Les Mann and Charlie Pick. He had batted .280 with 27 runs scored, 77 hits, one home run, 25 RBI, and 16 stolen bases in 73 games for the Braves.

=== Chicago Cubs (1919–1920) ===
With the Cubs, Herzog played exclusively at second base for the rest of 1919. In 52 games (193 at bats), he batted .275 with 15 runs scored, 53 hits, no home runs, 17 RBI, and 12 stolen bases. His combined totals between Boston and Chicago were a .278 average, 42 runs scored, 130 hits, one home run, and 42 RBI in 125 games (468 at bats). He and Greasy Neale tied for fifth in the NL with 28 stolen bases.

Herzog played second base for the Cubs in 1920 except for June and early July, when he was used mainly at third base. He became embroiled in controversy that August when he was one of a group of Cubs players accused of deliberately helping the team lose a game to the Phillies. No firm evidence connecting Herzog to the scandal was found, but he was seldom used after that. His only game in September was against the Giants on September 9. Herzog would later be accused by former Giants teammate Rube Benton of attempting a bribe, though that claim has not been verified. Released in January 1921, Herzog would never play in the major leagues again. In 91 games (305 at bats) in 1920, Herzog batted .193 with 39 runs scored, 59 hits, no home runs, and 19 RBI.

=== Final season (1921) and minor league manager (1924–1926) ===
After his release from the Cubs, Herzog played one final season of professional baseball, splitting the year between the Columbus Senators and the Louisville Colonels of the Class AA American Association. His $12,000 minor league contract was a record at the time, but Herzog stopped playing the next season when it was not renewed. The Newark Bears of the Class AA International League hired him as their manager in 1924, but they dismissed him before the start of the season. Returning to Maryland, Herzog managed the Easton Farmers of the Class D Eastern Shore League in 1925 and 1926, his final two seasons in professional baseball.

== Legacy and career statistics ==
Herzog set himself apart from other utility players in baseball history by his ability to play second base, shortstop, and third base equally well. According to Russo, "he is generally regarded as one of the most versatile infielders in the history of baseball." A very fast baserunner, he stole 10 or more bases in a season all but the final year of his playing, with a career-high of 46 in 1914. He was also an excellent bunter, and he displayed a good knowledge for the game, figuring out small things he could do that would help the team win. In 1,493 career games played, Herzog batted .259 (1,370 hits in 5,284 at bats) with 705 runs scored, 20 home runs, 449 RBI, and 320 stolen bases in 13 seasons.

== Later life ==
Continuing to live in Ridgely during his playing career, Herzog was well known among the baseball players for his skill at growing cantaloupes. He took on a variety of careers following his playing days. First, he coached the United States Naval Academy baseball team. Then, he worked for the Baltimore and Ohio Railroad for many years before eventually working at a Maryland racetrack.

In 1952, Herzog was hit by a car in downtown Baltimore, suffering "multiple lacerations", according to The New York Times. On January 14, 1953, he was discovered in the lobby of a Baltimore hotel, without any money and suffering from advanced tuberculosis. Baseball commissioner Ford Frick helped pay for Herzog to receive treatment at a Baltimore hospital, and several more of his old baseball friends contributed too. Herzog spent eight months battling the disease before dying of it on September 4, 1953. His final resting place was Denton Cemetery in Denton, Maryland, where he was buried next to his wife, Mattie, who had died 11 years before.

In 2008, a carriage house Herzog built in the early 1900s was saved from demolition and moved to the center of Ridgely.

== See also ==
- List of Major League Baseball career stolen bases leaders
- List of Major League Baseball player-managers
