= 1912 Major League Baseball season =

1912 MLB season
- League: American League (AL); National League (NL)
- Sport: Baseball
- Duration: Regular season: April 11 – October 6, 1912; World Series: October 8–16, 1912
- Games: 154
- Teams: 16 (8 per league)

Regular season
- Season MVP: AL: Tris Speaker (BOS); NL: Larry Doyle (NYG)
- AL champions: Boston Red Sox
- AL runners-up: Washington Senators
- NL champions: New York Giants
- NL runners-up: Pittsburgh Pirates

World Series
- Champions: Boston Red Sox
- Runners-up: New York Giants

MLB seasons
- ← 1911 1913 →

Locations of teams for the 1912 American League season
American League
Locations of teams for the 1912 National League season
National League

The 1912 major league baseball season began on April 11, 1912. The regular season ended on October 6, with the New York Giants and Boston Red Sox as the regular season champions of the National League and American League, respectively. The postseason began with Game 1 of the ninth modern World Series on October 8 and ended with Game 8 on October 16. The Red Sox defeated the Giants, four games to three (with one tie), capturing their second championship in franchise history, since their previous in 1903. Going into the season, the defending World Series champions were the Philadelphia Athletics from the 1911 season.

This was the second of four seasons that the Chalmers Award, a precursor to the Major League Baseball Most Valuable Player Award (introduced in 1931), was given to a player in each league.

During the season, Harper's Weekly conducted a detailed accounting of the expenses of major league clubs, reaching a figure of approximately $175,000 to $200,000.

The Boston Rustlers renamed as the Boston Braves.

== Schedule ==
The 1912 schedule consisted of 154 games for all teams in the American League and National League, each of which had eight teams. Each team was scheduled to play 22 games against the other seven teams of their respective league. This continued the format put in place for the 1904 season. This format would last until 1919.

Opening Day, April 11, featured all sixteen teams, only the second time every team has started their season on the same day (first being two years prior with the 1910 season). The final day of the regular season was on October 6. The World Series took place between October 8 and October 16.

== Rule change ==
The 1912 season saw the following rule change:

- The Class AA ("Double-A") level was created as the new highest level of minor-league baseball, with the elevation of the American Association, International League, and Pacific Coast League, from Class A ("Single-A").

== Teams ==
An asterisk (*) denotes the ballpark a team played the minority of their home games at

League	Team	City	Ballpark	Capacity	Manager
American League	Boston Red Sox	Boston, Massachusetts	Fenway Park	27,000	Jake Stahl
American League	Chicago White Sox	Chicago, Illinois	White Sox Park	28,000	Jimmy Callahan
American League	Cleveland Naps	Cleveland, Ohio	League Park	21,414	Harry Davis
American League	Cleveland Naps	Cleveland, Ohio	League Park	21,414	Joe Birmingham
American League	Detroit Tigers	Detroit, Michigan	Navin Field	23,000	Hughie Jennings
American League	New York Highlanders	New York, New York	Hilltop Park	16,000	Harry Wolverton
American League	New York Highlanders	New York, New York	Brush Stadium*	34,000*	Harry Wolverton
American League	Philadelphia Athletics	Philadelphia, Pennsylvania	Shibe Park	23,000	Connie Mack
American League	St. Louis Browns	St. Louis, Missouri	Sportsman's Park	18,000	Bobby Wallace
American League	St. Louis Browns	St. Louis, Missouri	Sportsman's Park	18,000	George Stovall
American League	Washington Senators	Washington, D.C.	National Park	27,000	Clark Griffith
National League	Boston Braves	Boston, Massachusetts	South End Grounds	11,000	Johnny Kling
National League	Brooklyn Trolley Dodgers	New York, New York	Washington Park	16,000	Bill Dahlen
National League	Chicago Cubs	Chicago, Illinois	West Side Park	16,000	Frank Chance
National League	Cincinnati Reds	Cincinnati, Ohio	Redland Field	20,696	Hank O'Day
National League	New York Giants	New York, New York	Brush Stadium	34,000	John McGraw
National League	Philadelphia Phillies	Philadelphia, Pennsylvania	National League Park	18,000	Red Dooin
National League	Pittsburgh Pirates	Pittsburgh, Pennsylvania	Forbes Field	23,000	Fred Clarke
National League	St. Louis Cardinals	St. Louis, Missouri	Robison Field	21,000	Roger Bresnahan

== Standings ==
=== American League ===
American League
Team	W	L	Pct.	GB	Home	Road
Boston Red Sox	105	47	.691	—	57‍–‍20	48‍–‍27
Washington Senators	91	61	.599	14	45‍–‍32	46‍–‍29
Philadelphia Athletics	90	62	.592	15	45‍–‍31	45‍–‍31
Chicago White Sox	78	76	.506	28	34‍–‍43	44‍–‍33
Cleveland Naps	75	78	.490	30½	41‍–‍35	34‍–‍43
Detroit Tigers	69	84	.451	36½	37‍–‍39	32‍–‍45
St. Louis Browns	53	101	.344	53	27‍–‍50	26‍–‍51
New York Highlanders	50	102	.329	55	31‍–‍44	19‍–‍58

=== National League ===
National League
Team	W	L	Pct.	GB	Home	Road
New York Giants	103	48	.682	—	49‍–‍25	54‍–‍23
Pittsburgh Pirates	93	58	.616	10	44‍–‍31	49‍–‍27
Chicago Cubs	91	59	.607	11½	46‍–‍30	45‍–‍29
Cincinnati Reds	75	78	.490	29	45‍–‍32	30‍–‍46
Philadelphia Phillies	73	79	.480	30½	34‍–‍41	39‍–‍38
St. Louis Cardinals	63	90	.412	41	37‍–‍40	26‍–‍50
Brooklyn Trolley Dodgers	58	95	.379	46	33‍–‍43	25‍–‍52
Boston Braves	52	101	.340	52	31‍–‍47	21‍–‍54

=== Tie games ===
13 tie games (8 in AL, 5 in NL), which are not factored into winning percentage or games behind (and were often replayed again) occurred throughout the season.

==== American League ====
- Boston Red Sox, 2
- Chicago White Sox, 4
- Cleveland Naps, 2
- Detroit Tigers, 1
- New York Highlanders, 1
- Philadelphia Athletics, 1
- St. Louis Browns, 3
- Washington Senators, 2

==== National League ====
- Boston Braves, 2
- Chicago Cubs, 2
- Cincinnati Reds, 2
- New York Giants, 3
- Pittsburgh Pirates, 1

== Postseason ==
The postseason began on October 8 and ended on October 16 with the Boston Red Sox defeating the New York Giants in the 1912 World Series in seven games.

=== Bracket ===
World Series
AL	Boston Red Sox	4
NL	New York Giants	3

== Managerial changes ==
=== Off-season ===
Team	Former Manager	New Manager
Boston Braves	Fred Tenney	Johnny Kling
Boston Red Sox	Patsy Donovan	Jake Stahl
Chicago White Sox	Hugh Duffy	Jimmy Callahan
Cincinnati Reds	Clark Griffith	Hank O'Day
Cleveland Naps	George Stovall	Harry Davis
New York Highlanders	Hal Chase	Harry Wolverton
Washington Senators	Jimmy McAleer	Clark Griffith

=== In-season ===
Team	Former Manager	New Manager
Cleveland Naps	Harry Davis	Joe Birmingham
St. Louis Browns	Bobby Wallace	George Stovall

== League leaders ==
=== American League ===
Hitting leaders
Stat	Player	Total
AVG	Ty Cobb (DET)	.409
OPS	Ty Cobb (DET)	1.040
HR	Home Run Baker (PHA); Tris Speaker (BOS)	10
RBI	Home Run Baker (PHA)	130
R	Eddie Collins (PHA)	137
H	Ty Cobb (DET); Joe Jackson (CLE)	226
SB	Clyde Milan (WSH)	88

Pitching leaders
Stat	Player	Total
W	Smoky Joe Wood (BOS)	34
L	Russ Ford (NYH)	21
ERA	Walter Johnson (WSH)	1.39
K	Walter Johnson (WSH)	303
IP	Ed Walsh (CWS)	393.0
SV	Ed Walsh (CWS)	10
WHIP	Walter Johnson (WSH)	0.908

=== National League ===
Hitting leaders
Stat	Player	Total
AVG	Heinie Zimmerman^{1} (CHC)	.372
OPS	Heinie Zimmerman (CHC)	.989
HR	Heinie Zimmerman^{1} (CHC)	14
RBI	Heinie Zimmerman^{1} (CHC)	104
R	Bob Bescher (CIN)	120
H	Heinie Zimmerman (CHC)	207
SB	Bob Bescher (CIN)	67

^{1} National League Triple Crown batting winner

Pitching leaders
Stat	Player	Total
W	Larry Cheney (CHC); Rube Marquard (NYG)	26
L	Lefty Tyler (BSN)	22
ERA	Jeff Tesreau (NYG)	1.96
K	Grover Alexander (PHI)	195
IP	Grover Alexander (PHI)	310.1
SV	Slim Sallee (STL)	6
WHIP	Hank Robinson (PIT)	1.006

== Milestones ==
=== Batters ===
==== Cycles ====
- Tris Speaker (BOS):
  - Speaker hit for his first cycle and fourth in franchise history, on June 9 against the St. Louis Browns.
- Chief Meyers (NYG):
  - Meyers hit for his first cycle and fourth in franchise history, on June 10 against the Chicago Cubs.
- Bert Daniels (NYH):
  - Daniels hit for his first cycle and first in franchise history, on July 25 against the Chicago White Sox.
- Honus Wagner (PIT):
  - Wagner hit for his first cycle and fifth in franchise history, in game two of a doubleheader on August 22 against the New York Giants.

=== Pitchers ===
==== No-hitters ====
- George Mullin (DET):
  - Mullin threw his first career no-hitter and first in franchise history, by defeating the St. Louis Browns 7–0 in game 2 of a doubleheader on July 4. Mullin walked five and struck out five.
- Earl Hamilton (SLB):
  - Hamilton threw his first career no-hitter and first in franchise history, by defeating the Detroit Tigers 5–1 on August 30. Hamilton walked walked and struck out nobody.
- Jeff Tesreau (NYG):
  - Tesreau threw his first career no-hitter and fifth in franchise history, by defeating the Philadelphia Phillies 3–0 in game 1 of a doubleheader on September 6. Tesreau walked two and struck out two.

==== Other pitching accomplishments ====
- Christy Mathewson (NYG):
  - Became the eighth member of the 300-win club, defeating the Chicago Cubs on June 13, winning 3–2.

== Awards and honors ==
- Chalmers Award: Larry Doyle (NYG, National); Tris Speaker (BOS, American)

== Home field attendance ==
Team name	Wins	%±	Home attendance	%±	Per game
New York Giants	103	4.0%	638,000	−5.5%	8,395
Chicago White Sox	78	1.3%	602,241	3.3%	7,721
Boston Red Sox	105	34.6%	597,096	18.5%	7,655
Philadelphia Athletics	90	−10.9%	517,653	−14.5%	6,723
Chicago Cubs	91	−1.1%	514,000	−10.8%	6,590
Detroit Tigers	69	−22.5%	402,870	−16.9%	5,301
Pittsburgh Pirates	93	9.4%	384,000	−11.1%	5,120
Washington Senators	91	42.2%	350,663	43.2%	4,496
Cincinnati Reds	75	7.1%	344,000	14.7%	4,468
Cleveland Naps	75	−6.3%	336,844	−17.1%	4,375
Philadelphia Phillies	73	−7.6%	250,000	−39.9%	3,333
Brooklyn Trolley Dodgers	58	−9.4%	243,000	−9.7%	3,197
New York Highlanders	50	−34.2%	242,194	−19.9%	3,187
St. Louis Cardinals	63	−16.0%	241,759	−46.0%	3,140
St. Louis Browns	53	17.8%	214,070	2.9%	2,710
Boston Braves	52	18.2%	121,000	4.3%	1,532

== Venues ==
The 1912 season saw two teams play their last seasons at their respective venues.

- The Brooklyn Trolley Dodgers would play their last game at Washington Park on October 5 against the New York Giants, moving into Ebbets Field for the start of the 1913 season.
- The New York Highlanders would play their last game at Hilltop Park on October 5 against the Washington Senators, moving into the Brush Stadium for the start of the 1913 season.

The 1912 season saw three teams play in new venues.

- The Boston Red Sox leave the Huntington Avenue Grounds (where they played for 11 seasons) and opened Fenway Park, where they continue to play to this day.
- The Cincinnati Reds leave the Palace of the Fans (where they played for ten seasons) and opened Redland Field, where they would go on to play for 59 seasons through 1970.
- The Detroit Tigers leave Bennett Park (where they played for 12 seasons as a Major League team and five seasons as a Minor League team in the Western League) and opened Navin Field, where they would go on to play for 88 seasons through 1999.

League Park, the home of the St. Louis Cardinals, was renamed to Robison Field by Helene Britton, named after her father and uncle, Frank and Stanley Robison, respectively.

To accommodate for large crowds, the New York Highlanders would play three home games at the Brush Stadium, home of the New York Giants, on May 30 and a doubleheader on September 2.

== See also ==
- 1912 in baseball (Events, Births, Deaths)
