= Hank Griffin (baseball) =

American baseball player (1886–1950)

- Pitcher
- Born: July 11, 1886; Whitehouse, Texas, U.S.
- Died: February 11, 1950 (aged 63); Terrell, Texas, U.S.
- Batted: Right Threw: Right

MLB debut
- May 5, 1911, for the Chicago Cubs

Last MLB appearance
- May 20, 1912, for the Boston Braves

MLB statistics
- Win–loss record: 0–6
- Earned run average: 5.80
- Strikeouts: 31
- Stats at Baseball Reference

Teams
- Chicago Cubs (1911); Boston Braves (1911–1912)

James Linton Griffin (July 11, 1886 – February 11, 1950), nicknamed "Pepper", was an American pitcher in Major League Baseball. He played for the Chicago Cubs and Boston Braves.
