= Al Kaiser =

American baseball player (1886–1969)

- Outfielder
- Born: August 3, 1886; Cincinnati, Ohio, U.S.
- Died: April 11, 1969 (aged 82); Cincinnati, Ohio, U.S.
- Batted: Right Threw: Right

MLB debut
- April 1, 1911, for the Chicago Cubs

Last MLB appearance
- August 30, 1914, for the Indianapolis Hoosiers

MLB statistics
- Batting average: .216
- Home runs: 3
- Runs batted in: 38
- Stats at Baseball Reference

Teams
- Chicago Cubs (1911); Boston Rustlers/Braves (1911–1912); Indianapolis Hoosiers (1914)

Alfred Edward Kaiser (August 3, 1886 – April 11, 1969) was an American Major League Baseball outfielder. He played three seasons in the majors, between 1911 and 1914, for the Chicago Cubs, Boston Braves and Indianapolis Hoosiers.
