= Doc Miller =

Canadian baseball player (1883–1938)

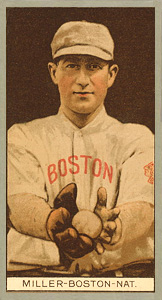
- Outfielder
- Born: February 4, 1883; Chatham, Ontario, Canada
- Died: July 31, 1938 (aged 55); Jersey City, New Jersey, U.S.
- Batted: Left Threw: Left

MLB debut
- May 4, 1910, for the Chicago Cubs

Last MLB appearance
- September 28, 1914, for the Cincinnati Reds

MLB statistics
- Batting average: .295
- Home runs: 12
- Runs batted in: 237
- Stats at Baseball Reference

Teams
- Chicago Cubs (1910); Boston Doves/Rustlers/Braves (1910–12); Philadelphia Phillies (1912–13); Cincinnati Reds (1914)

Member of the Canadian

Baseball Hall of Fame
- Induction: 2009

Roy Oscar "Doc" Miller (February 4, 1883 – July 31, 1938) was a Canadian born Major League Baseball outfielder from 1910–1914. He played for the Chicago Cubs, Boston Braves, Cincinnati Reds, and Philadelphia Phillies. He was interred in North Bergen's Garden State Crematory. Miller was posthumously inducted into the Canadian Baseball Hall of Fame in 2009.

In 557 games over five seasons, Miller posted a .295 batting average (507-for-1717) with 184 runs, 12 home runs, 237 RBI and 64 stolen bases. He finished his career with a .958 fielding percentage at all three outfield positions. He died from a fall in New Jersey.
