= 1911 Major League Baseball season =

1911 MLB season
- League: American League (AL); National League (NL)
- Sport: Baseball
- Duration: Regular season: April 12 – October 8, 1911 (AL); April 12 – October 12, 1911 (NL); World Series: October 17–26, 1911
- Games: 154
- Teams: 16 (8 per league)

Regular season
- Season MVP: AL: Ty Cobb (DET); NL: Frank Schulte (CHC)
- AL champions: Philadelphia Athletics
- AL runners-up: Detroit Tigers
- NL champions: New York Giants
- NL runners-up: Chicago Cubs

World Series
- Champions: Philadelphia Athletics
- Runners-up: New York Giants

MLB seasons
- ← 1910 1912 →

Locations of teams for the 1911 American League season
American League
Locations of teams for the 1911 National League season
National League

The 1911 major league baseball season began on April 12, 1911. The regular season ended on October 12, with the New York Giants and Philadelphia Athletics as the regular season champions of the National League and American League, respectively. The postseason began with Game 1 of the eighth modern World Series on October 14 and ended with Game 6 on October 26. In the second iteration of this World Series matchup, the Athletics defeated the Giants, four games to two, capturing their second championship in franchise history, and the second team to win back-to-back World Series.

This was the first of four seasons that the Chalmers Award, a precursor to the Major League Baseball Most Valuable Player Award (introduced in 1931), was given to a player in each league.

This is the most recent major league season from which no stadiums remain in use. The Boston Red Sox have used Fenway Park as their home field since the 1912 season. The Boston Doves and Brooklyn Superbas renamed as the Boston Rustlers and Brooklyn Trolley Dodgers, respectively.

== Schedule ==
The 1911 schedule consisted of 154 games for all teams in the American League and National League, each of which had eight teams. Each team was scheduled to play 22 games against the other seven teams of their respective league. This continued the format put in place for the 1904 season. This format would last until 1919.

Opening Day took place on April 12 with all but the Chicago White Sox and Detroit Tigers playing. The American League would see its final day of the regular season on October 8, while the National League would see its final day of the regular season was on October 12. The World Series took place between October 14 and October 26.

== Teams ==
An asterisk (*) denotes the ballpark a team played the minority of their home games at

League	Team	City	Ballpark	Capacity	Manager
American League	Boston Red Sox	Boston, Massachusetts	Huntington Avenue Grounds	11,500	Patsy Donovan
American League	Chicago White Sox	Chicago, Illinois	White Sox Park	28,000	Hugh Duffy
American League	Cleveland Naps	Cleveland, Ohio	League Park	21,414	Deacon McGuire
American League	Cleveland Naps	Cleveland, Ohio	League Park	21,414	George Stovall
American League	Detroit Tigers	Detroit, Michigan	Bennett Park	14,000	Hughie Jennings
American League	New York Highlanders	New York, New York	Hilltop Park	16,000	Hal Chase
American League	Philadelphia Athletics	Philadelphia, Pennsylvania	Shibe Park	23,000	Connie Mack
American League	St. Louis Browns	St. Louis, Missouri	Sportsman's Park	18,000	Bobby Wallace
American League	Washington Senators	Washington, D.C.	National Park	27,000	Jimmy McAleer
National League	Boston Rustlers	Boston, Massachusetts	South End Grounds	9,800	Fred Tenney
National League	Brooklyn Trolley Dodgers	New York, New York	Washington Park	14,000	Bill Dahlen
National League	Chicago Cubs	Chicago, Illinois	West Side Park	16,000	Frank Chance
National League	Cincinnati Reds	Cincinnati, Ohio	Palace of the Fans	12,000	Clark Griffith
National League	New York Giants	New York, New York	Brush Stadium	34,000	John McGraw
National League	New York Giants	New York, New York	Hilltop Park*	16,000*	John McGraw
National League	Philadelphia Phillies	Philadelphia, Pennsylvania	National League Park	18,000	Red Dooin
National League	Pittsburgh Pirates	Pittsburgh, Pennsylvania	Forbes Field	23,000	Fred Clarke
National League	St. Louis Cardinals	St. Louis, Missouri	Robison Field	21,000	Roger Bresnahan

== Standings ==
=== American League ===
American League
Team	W	L	Pct.	GB	Home	Road
Philadelphia Athletics	101	50	.669	—	54‍–‍20	47‍–‍30
Detroit Tigers	89	65	.578	13½	51‍–‍25	38‍–‍40
Cleveland Naps	80	73	.523	22	46‍–‍30	34‍–‍43
Boston Red Sox	78	75	.510	24	39‍–‍37	39‍–‍38
Chicago White Sox	77	74	.510	24	40‍–‍37	37‍–‍37
New York Highlanders	76	76	.500	25½	36‍–‍40	40‍–‍36
Washington Senators	64	90	.416	38½	39‍–‍38	25‍–‍52
St. Louis Browns	45	107	.296	56½	25‍–‍53	20‍–‍54

=== National League ===
National League
Team	W	L	Pct.	GB	Home	Road
New York Giants	99	54	.647	—	49‍–‍25	50‍–‍29
Chicago Cubs	92	62	.597	7½	49‍–‍32	43‍–‍30
Pittsburgh Pirates	85	69	.552	14½	48‍–‍29	37‍–‍40
Philadelphia Phillies	79	73	.520	19½	42‍–‍34	37‍–‍39
St. Louis Cardinals	75	74	.503	22	36‍–‍38	39‍–‍36
Cincinnati Reds	70	83	.458	29	38‍–‍42	32‍–‍41
Brooklyn Trolley Dodgers	64	86	.427	33½	31‍–‍42	33‍–‍44
Boston Rustlers	44	107	.291	54	19‍–‍54	25‍–‍53

=== Tie games ===
19 tie games (4 in AL, 15 in NL), which are not factored into winning percentage or games behind (and were often replayed again) occurred throughout the season.

==== American League ====
- Chicago White Sox, 3
- Cleveland Naps, 3
- New York Highlanders, 1
- Philadelphia Athletics, 1

==== National League ====
- Boston Rustlers, 5
- Brooklyn Trolley Dodgers, 4
- Chicago Cubs, 3
- Cincinnati Reds, 6
- New York Giants, 1
- Philadelphia Phillies, 1
- Pittsburgh Pirates, 1
- St. Louis Cardinals, 9

== Postseason ==
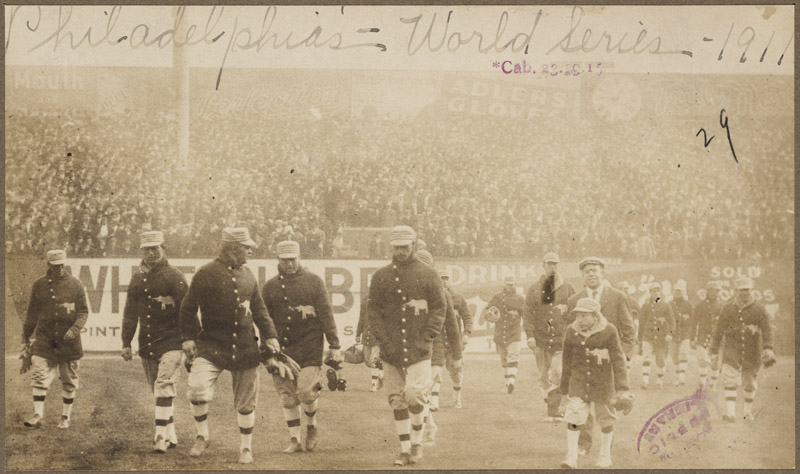
Philadelphia Athletics on field at Shibe Park, 1911 World Series

The postseason began on October 17 and ended on October 26 with the Philadelphia Athletics defeating the New York Giants in the 1911 World Series in six games.

=== Bracket ===
World Series
AL	Philadelphia Athletics	4
NL	New York Giants	2

== Managerial changes ==
=== Off-season ===
Team	Former Manager	New Manager
Boston Rustlers	Fred Lake	Fred Tenney
St. Louis Browns	Jack O'Connor	Bobby Wallace

=== In-season ===
Team	Former Manager	New Manager
Cleveland Naps	Deacon McGuire	George Stovall

== League leaders ==
=== American League ===
Hitting leaders
Stat	Player	Total
AVG	Ty Cobb (DET)	.419
OPS	Ty Cobb (DET)	1.086
HR	Home Run Baker (PHA)	11
RBI	Ty Cobb (DET)	127
R	Ty Cobb (DET)	148
H	Ty Cobb (DET)	248
SB	Ty Cobb (DET)	83

Pitching leaders
Stat	Player	Total
W	Jack Coombs (PHA)	28
L	Jack Powell (SLB)	19
ERA	Vean Gregg (CLE)	1.80
K	Ed Walsh (CWS)	255
IP	Ed Walsh (CWS)	368.2
SV	Charley Hall (BOS); Eddie Plank (PHA); Ed Walsh (CWS)	4
WHIP	Vean Gregg (CLE)	1.054

=== National League ===
Hitting leaders
Stat	Player	Total
AVG	Honus Wagner (PIT)	.334
OPS	Honus Wagner (PIT)	.930
HR	Frank Schulte (CHC)	21
RBI	Frank Schulte (CHC); Owen Wilson (PIT)	107
R	Jimmy Sheckard (CHC)	121
H	Doc Miller (BSN)	192
SB	Bob Bescher (CIN)	81

Pitching leaders
Stat	Player	Total
W	Grover Alexander (PHI)	28
L	Earl Moore (PHI); Bill Steele (STL)	19
ERA	Christy Mathewson (NYG)	1.99
K	Rube Marquard (NYG)	237
IP	Grover Alexander (PHI)	367.0
SV	Mordecai Brown (CHC)	13
WHIP	Babe Adams (PIT)	1.006

== Milestones ==
=== Batters ===
==== Cycles ====
- Frank Baker (PHA):
  - Baker hit for his first cycle and third in franchise history, in game two of a doubleheader on July 3 against the New York Highlanders.

==== Other batting accomplishments ====
- Fred Clarke (PIT):
  - Recorded his 500th career stolen base in the fourth inning against the Chicago Cubs on April 29. He became the 16th player to reach this mark.
- Honus Wagner (PIT):
  - Recorded his 600th career stolen base in the seventh inning against the Brooklyn Trolley Dodgers on June 13. He became the fifth player to reach this mark.

=== Pitchers ===
==== No-hitters ====
- Smoky Joe Wood (BOS):
  - Wood threw his first career no-hitter and fifth no-hitter in franchise history, by defeating the St. Louis Browns 5–0 in game one of a doubleheader on July 29. Wood walked two, hit one by pitch, and struck out twelve.
- Ed Walsh (CWS):
  - Walsh threw his first career no-hitter and fourth no-hitter in franchise history, by defeating the Boston Red Sox 5–0 on August 27. Walsh walked one and struck out eight.

==== Other pitching accomplishments ====
- Cy Young (BSN):
  - Set a major league record for most career wins at 511 on September 22 in a 1–0 win over the Pittsburgh Pirates in his last career win.

=== Miscellaneous ===
- Detroit Tigers:
  - Set a major league record for largest deficit ever overcome to win on June 18. The Tigers in a 12-run deficit, down 13–1 after the top of the fifth inning, would go on to win the game 16–15 over the Chicago White Sox.
- Philadelphia Phillies / St. Louis Cardinals:
  - Became the second set of teams to tie a major league record for most combined walks in a single game at 23, with the Philadelphia Phillies walking 10 batters and the St. Louis Cardinals walking 13, on July 6 in a game that St. Louis won 13–9.
- Boston Rustlers:
  - Set the modern National League record for worst winning percentage with .291. The previous record of .294 was set by the Boston Doves in 1909.

== Awards and honors ==
- Chalmers Award: Frank Schulte (CHC, National); Ty Cobb (DET, American)

== Home field attendance ==
Team name	Wins	%±	Home attendance	%±	Per game
New York Giants	99	8.8%	675,000	31.9%	9,000
Philadelphia Athletics	101	-1.0%	605,749	2.9%	8,077
Chicago White Sox	77	13.2%	583,208	5.6%	7,477
Chicago Cubs	92	-11.5%	576,000	9.5%	6,857
Boston Red Sox	78	-3.7%	503,961	-13.8%	6,631
Detroit Tigers	89	3.5%	484,988	23.9%	6,381
St. Louis Cardinals	75	19.0%	447,768	25.9%	5,668
Pittsburgh Pirates	85	-1.2%	432,000	-1.1%	5,538
Philadelphia Phillies	79	1.3%	416,000	40.3%	5,474
Cleveland Naps	80	12.7%	406,296	38.5%	5,277
New York Highlanders	76	-13.6%	302,444	-15.0%	3,928
Cincinnati Reds	70	-6.7%	300,000	-21.2%	3,659
Brooklyn Trolley Dodgers	64	0.0%	269,000	-3.7%	3,635
Washington Senators	64	-3.0%	244,884	-3.8%	3,180
St. Louis Browns	45	-4.3%	207,984	-16.8%	2,666
Boston Rustlers	44	-17.0%	116,000	-22.2%	1,547

== Venues ==
The 1911 season saw three teams play their last seasons at their respective venues.

- The Boston Red Sox would play their last game at the Huntington Avenue Grounds on October 7 against the Washington Senators, moving into Fenway Park for the start of the 1912 season.
- The Cincinnati Reds would play their last game at the Palace of the Fans on October 12 against the Chicago Cubs, moving into Redland Field for the start of the 1912 season.
- The Detroit Tigers would play their last game at Bennett Park on September 10 against the Cleveland Naps, moving into Navin Field for the start of the 1912 season.

The 1911 season saw two teams play in new venues due to fires.

- Prior to the start of the season, the Washington Senators home at National Park burned down on March 17. The Senators played there for seven seasons, and the venue was previously home to the defunct AA/NL Washington Senators from 1891 through 1899. A new venue, also called National Park, was quickly built on the same site, in time for Opening Day on April 12 to play a game with fans in attendance. The Senators would go on to play there for the rest of their tenure in Washington, D.C. for 50 seasons through 1960, before moving to Minnesota as the Minnesota Twins.
- On April 14, after only two home games, much of the New York Giants home, the Polo Grounds, burned down, forcing the team to play 28 home games at the home of the New York Highlanders, Hilltop Park for the remaining April and May home games. Following a month long road trip, the Giants returned to a reconstructed Polo Grounds, now called Brush Stadium after owner John T. Brush, on June 28 and would play their remaining 45 home games there.

== See also ==
- 1911 in baseball (Events, Births, Deaths)
