= 1916 Pittsburgh Pirates season =

1916 Pittsburgh Pirates
- League: National League
- Ballpark: Forbes Field
- City: Pittsburgh, Pennsylvania
- Owners: Barney Dreyfuss
- Managers: Nixey Callahan

The 1916 Pittsburgh Pirates season was the 35th season of the Pittsburgh Pirates franchise; the 30th in the National League. In April 1916, newspapers reported that Otto Knabe would join the team at second base at the end of the month.

The Pirates finished sixth in the league standings with a record of 65–89.

== Regular season ==
=== Season standings ===
National League
Team	W	L	Pct.	GB	Home	Road
Brooklyn Robins	94	60	.610	—	50‍–‍27	44‍–‍33
Philadelphia Phillies	91	62	.595	2½	50‍–‍29	41‍–‍33
Boston Braves	89	63	.586	4	41‍–‍31	48‍–‍32
New York Giants	86	66	.566	7	47‍–‍30	39‍–‍36
Chicago Cubs	67	86	.438	26½	37‍–‍41	30‍–‍45
Pittsburgh Pirates	65	89	.422	29	37‍–‍40	28‍–‍49
St. Louis Cardinals	60	93	.392	33½	36‍–‍40	24‍–‍53
Cincinnati Reds	60	93	.392	33½	32‍–‍44	28‍–‍49

=== Record vs. opponents ===
1916 National League record Sources:
Team	BSN	BRO	CHC	CIN	NYG	PHI	PIT	STL
Boston	—	13–9	14–7–2	13–9–1	11–10–1	11–11–1	14–8–1	13–9
Brooklyn	9–13	—	15–7–1	15–7–1	15–7	11–11	14–8	15–7
Chicago	7–14–2	7–15–1	—	9–13	10–12	8–14	12–10	14–8
Cincinnati	9–13–1	7–15–1	13–9	—	5–16	5–17	13–9	8–14
New York	10–11–1	7–15	12–10	16–5	—	9–13	17–5–2	15–7
Philadelphia	11–11–1	11–11	14–8	17–5	13–9	—	13–9	12–9
Pittsburgh	8–14–1	8–14	10–12	9–13	5–17–2	9–13	—	16–6
St. Louis	9–13	7–15	8–14	14–8	7–15	9–12	6–16	—

=== Game log ===
1916 Game Log: 65–89 (Home: 37–40; Away: 28–49)
April: 6–8 (Home: 3–1; Away: 3–7)

#	Date	Opponent	Score	Win	Loss	Save	Attendance	Record
1	April 12	@ Cardinals	1–2	Doak	**Kantlehner** (0–1)	—	—	0–1
2	April 13	@ Cardinals	4–0	**Adams** (1–0)	Meadows	—	—	1–1
3	April 14	@ Cardinals	3–5	Jasper	**Harmon** (0–1)	Griner	—	1–2
4	April 15	@ Cardinals	6–1	**Mamaux** (1–0)	Hall	—	—	2–2
5	April 16	@ Reds	1–6	Toney	**Miller** (0–1)	—	—	2–3
6	April 17	@ Reds	10–1	**Kantlehner** (1–1)	Dale	—	—	3–3
7	April 18	@ Reds	3–4 (10)	Schneider	**Adams** (1–1)	—	—	3–4
8	April 20	Cardinals	0–5	Meadows	**Mamaux** (1–1)	Sallee	—	3–5
9	April 21	Cardinals	8–0	**Harmon** (1–1)	Steele	—	—	4–5
10	April 23	@ Cubs	0–3	McConnell	**Kantlehner** (1–2)	—	16,000	4–6
11	April 26	@ Cubs	3–6	Lavender	**Adams** (1–2)	Prendergast	—	4–7
12	April 28	Reds	5–1	**Harmon** (2–1)	Schneider	—	—	5–7
13	April 29	Reds	2–1	**Mamaux** (2–1)	Toney	**Miller** (1)	—	6–7
14	April 30	@ Reds	7–8	Schneider	**Harmon** (2–2)	—	—	6–8

May: 11–14 (Home: 6–12; Away: 5–2)

#	Date	Opponent	Score	Win	Loss	Save	Attendance	Record
15	May 1	@ Reds	0–3	Mitchell	**Adams** (1–3)	—	—	6–9
16	May 4	Cubs	4–2	**Cooper** (1–0)	Lavender	—	4,000	7–9
17	May 5	Cubs	3–5 (13)	Seaton	**Kantlehner** (1–3)	—	—	7–10
18	May 6	Cubs	1–2	Vaughn	**Adams** (1–4)	—	8,000	7–11
19	May 7	@ Cubs	1–0	**Kantlehner** (2–3)	Lavender	—	19,000	8–11
20	May 8	@ Cubs	1–2	McConnell	**Cooper** (1–1)	—	—	8–12
21	May 8	@ Cubs	6–4	**Mamaux** (3–1)	Packard	—	—	9–12
22	May 9	Giants	5–13	Tesreau	**Harmon** (2–3)	Mathewson	—	9–13
23	May 10	Giants	1–7	Anderson	**Adams** (1–5)	—	2,000	9–14
24	May 11	Giants	2–3	Perritt	**Kantlehner** (2–4)	Stroud	2,000	9–15
25	May 12	Giants	2–3 (10)	Schauer	**Mamaux** (3–2)	—	2,000	9–16
26	May 13	Braves	5–3	**Adams** (2–5)	Reulbach	**Kantlehner** (1)	—	10–16
27	May 15	Braves	8–7	**Harmon** (3–3)	Rudolph	**Mamaux** (1)	—	11–16
28	May 18	Phillies	0–3	Alexander	**Kantlehner** (2–5)	—	—	11–17
29	May 19	Phillies	4–2	**Mamaux** (4–2)	McQuillan	—	—	12–17
30	May 20	Phillies	1–5	Demaree	**Adams** (2–6)	—	—	12–18
31	May 23	Robins	0–6	Pfeffer	**Kantlehner** (2–6)	—	—	12–19
32	May 24	Robins	2–3 (10)	Cheney	**Harmon** (3–4)	—	—	12–20
33	May 25	Robins	5–0	**Miller** (1–1)	Dell	—	—	13–20
34	May 26	@ Cardinals	6–5 (11)	**Mamaux** (5–2)	Sallee	—	2,000	14–20
35	May 28	@ Cardinals	4–0	**Cooper** (2–1)	Doak	—	—	15–20
36	May 28	@ Cardinals	4–1 (5)	**Mamaux** (6–2)	Meadows	—	—	16–20
37	May 29	Reds	1–6	Mitchell	**Jacobs** (0–1)	—	—	16–21
38	May 30	Reds	9–8	**Cooper** (3–1)	Schulz	—	—	17–21
39	May 31	Reds	2–5 (16)	Toney	**Miller** (1–2)	—	—	17–22

June: 11–9 (Home: 4–2; Away: 7–7)

#	Date	Opponent	Score	Win	Loss	Save	Attendance	Record
40	June 1	Reds	8–4	**Harmon** (4–4)	Schneider	—	—	18–22
41	June 2	@ Robins	5–2	**Mamaux** (7–2)	Appleton	—	—	19–22
42	June 5	@ Robins	2–3	Dell	**Miller** (1–3)	—	2,500	19–23
43	June 6	@ Giants	3–2	**Mamaux** (8–2)	Benton	—	9,000	20–23
44	June 12	@ Phillies	1–2	Alexander	**Mamaux** (8–3)	—	—	20–24
45	June 13	@ Phillies	3–5	Bender	**Adams** (2–7)	—	4,000	20–25
46	June 14	@ Phillies	2–3 (12)	Rixey	**Jacobs** (0–2)	—	—	20–26
47	June 15	@ Braves	2–1	**Mamaux** (9–3)	Reulbach	—	—	21–26
48	June 16	@ Braves	0–2	Hughes	**Kantlehner** (2–7)	—	—	21–27
49	June 20	Cardinals	6–10 (12)	Jasper	**Miller** (1–4)	Williams	—	21–28
50	June 22	Cardinals	8–4	**Jacobs** (1–2)	Williams	—	—	22–28
51	June 23	Cardinals	7–8	Jasper	**Harmon** (4–5)	Ames	—	22–29
52	June 24	Cardinals	4–3	**Mamaux** (10–3)	Steele	—	—	23–29
53	June 24	Cardinals	5–2	**Miller** (2–4)	Hall	—	—	24–29
54	June 25	@ Cubs	8–3 (12)	**Cooper** (4–1)	Vaughn	—	—	25–29
55	June 27	@ Cubs	0–1	Prendergast	**Cooper** (4–2)	—	—	25–30
56	June 27	@ Cubs	4–10	Seaton	**Adams** (2–8)	Prendergast	—	25–31
57	June 28	@ Cubs	3–2	**Mamaux** (11–3)	Lavender	—	—	26–31
58	June 28	@ Cubs	3–2 (18)	**Cooper** (5–2)	McConnell	—	—	27–31
59	June 30	@ Reds	3–2	**Harmon** (5–5)	Schneider	—	—	28–31

July: 11–18 (Home: 8–10; Away: 3–8)

#	Date	Opponent	Score	Win	Loss	Save	Attendance	Record
60	July 1	@ Reds	2–1	**Mamaux** (12–3)	Knetzer	—	—	29–31
61	July 2	@ Reds	2–3	Toney	**Miller** (2–5)	—	—	29–32
62	July 2	@ Reds	6–1 (5)	**Kantlehner** (3–7)	Dale	—	6,000	30–32
63	July 3	Cubs	2–3	Seaton	**Cooper** (5–3)	Packard	—	30–33
64	July 4	Cubs	0–5	Vaughn	**Kantlehner** (3–8)	—	—	30–34
65	July 4	Cubs	1–0	**Mamaux** (13–3)	Prendergast	—	—	31–34
66	July 5	Cubs	3–4	Hendrix	**Miller** (2–6)	Lavender	—	31–35
67	July 6	Giants	6–12	Perritt	**Cooper** (5–4)	—	—	31–36
68	July 7	Giants	5–2	**Jacobs** (2–2)	Anderson	—	—	32–36
69	July 8	Giants	4–6	Benton	**Mamaux** (13–4)	—	—	32–37
70	July 10	Giants	7–1	**Miller** (3–6)	Schauer	—	—	33–37
71	July 11	Braves	3–2	**Jacobs** (3–2)	Barnes	—	—	34–37
72	July 12	Braves	5–6	Barnes	**Mamaux** (13–5)	Hughes	—	34–38
73	July 14	Braves	0–3	Ragan	**Harmon** (5–6)	—	2,500	34–39
74	July 15	Phillies	0–4	Alexander	**Jacobs** (3–3)	—	—	34–40
75	July 15	Phillies	7–5	**Mamaux** (14–5)	Chalmers	**Kantlehner** (2)	—	35–40
76	July 19	Robins	1–0	**Kantlehner** (4–8)	Pfeffer	—	—	36–40
77	July 19	Robins	2–1 (14)	**Miller** (4–6)	Smith	—	—	37–40
78	July 22	Robins	1–7	Pfeffer	**Kantlehner** (4–9)	—	—	37–41
79	July 22	Robins	2–3 (15)	Marquard	**Miller** (4–7)	—	—	37–42
80	July 24	Phillies	9–1	**Mamaux** (15–5)	Demaree	—	—	38–42
81	July 26	@ Phillies	1–7	Alexander	**Adams** (2–9)	—	—	38–43
82	July 26	@ Phillies	5–2	**Miller** (5–7)	Rixey	—	12,000	39–43
83	July 27	@ Phillies	4–5	Chalmers	**Harmon** (5–7)	—	3,500	39–44
84	July 28	@ Phillies	2–5	Bender	**Jacobs** (3–4)	—	4,500	39–45
85	July 29	@ Giants	3–4 (11)	Perritt	**Mamaux** (15–6)	—	—	39–46
86	July 29	@ Giants	0–5	Anderson	**Kantlehner** (4–10)	—	25,000	39–47
87	July 31	@ Giants	0–7	Sallee	**Miller** (5–8)	—	—	39–48
88	July 31	@ Giants	0–7	Tesreau	**Jacobs** (3–5)	—	—	39–49

August: 16–15 (Home: 10–9; Away: 6–6)

#	Date	Opponent	Score	Win	Loss	Save	Attendance	Record
89	August 1	@ Giants	4–3 (10)	**Cooper** (6–4)	Schupp	—	5,000	40–49
90	August 2	@ Giants	2–6	Benton	**Mamaux** (15–7)	—	—	40–50
91	August 3	@ Robins	2–7	Cheney	**Miller** (5–9)	—	2,500	40–51
92	August 4	@ Robins	0–2	Smith	**Harmon** (5–8)	—	—	40–52
93	August 5	@ Robins	0–4	Marquard	**Cooper** (6–5)	—	—	40–53
94	August 5	@ Robins	7–1	**Mamaux** (16–7)	Pfeffer	—	—	41–53
95	August 11	@ Braves	2–1	**Miller** (6–9)	Barnes	—	—	42–53
96	August 11	@ Braves	1–4	Tyler	**Mamaux** (16–8)	—	10,000	42–54
97	August 12	Cubs	3–0	**Cooper** (7–5)	Lavender	—	—	43–54
98	August 13	@ Cardinals	8–9 (11)	Ames	**Kantlehner** (4–11)	—	—	43–55
99	August 13	@ Cardinals	9–5 (5)	**Mamaux** (17–8)	Watson	—	—	44–55
100	August 15	@ Cardinals	1–0	**Harmon** (6–8)	Meadows	—	—	45–55
101	August 15	@ Cardinals	2–1	**Cooper** (8–5)	Ames	—	—	46–55
102	August 17	Robins	1–5	Pfeffer	**Mamaux** (17–9)	—	—	46–56
103	August 18	Robins	0–6	Cheney	**Harmon** (6–9)	—	—	46–57
104	August 19	Robins	2–1 (10)	**Cooper** (9–5)	Smith	—	—	47–57
105	August 19	Robins	0–1	Marquard	**Kantlehner** (4–12)	—	—	47–58
106	August 21	Phillies	6–3	**Jacobs** (4–5)	Alexander	—	—	48–58
107	August 21	Phillies	2–1	**Evans** (1–0)	Demaree	—	—	49–58
108	August 22	Phillies	2–6	Mayer	**Harmon** (6–10)	McQuillan	—	49–59
109	August 22	Phillies	9–7	**Cooper** (10–5)	Bender	—	—	50–59
110	August 23	Phillies	2–1 (16)	**Evans** (2–0)	Rixey	—	1,000	51–59
111	August 24	Giants	10–1	**Jacobs** (5–5)	Tesreau	—	—	52–59
112	August 25	Giants	2–6 (11)	Tesreau	**Harmon** (6–11)	—	3,000	52–60
113	August 26	Giants	1–1 (14)			—	—	52–60
114	August 28	Braves	5–1	**Mamaux** (18–9)	Rudolph	—	—	53–60
115	August 28	Braves	2–8 (7)	Allen	**Kantlehner** (4–13)	—	5,000	53–61
116	August 29	Braves	1–6	Tyler	**Jacobs** (5–6)	—	—	53–62
117	August 29	Braves	5–9	Hughes	**Kantlehner** (4–14)	—	7,000	53–63
118	August 30	Braves	0–1	Rudolph	**Cooper** (10–6)	—	—	53–64
119	August 30	Braves	7–6	**Jacobs** (6–6)	Allen	**Cooper** (1)	5,000	54–64
120	August 31	Braves	3–2 (8)	**Mamaux** (19–9)	Nehf	—	2,000	55–64

September: 10–24 (Home: 6–6; Away: 4–18)

#	Date	Opponent	Score	Win	Loss	Save	Attendance	Record
121	September 1	Reds	3–6	Toney	**Jacobs** (6–7)	—	—	55–65
122	September 2	Reds	4–3	**Harmon** (7–11)	Knetzer	—	—	56–65
123	September 2	Reds	2–7	Moseley	**Evans** (2–1)	Schulz	10,000	56–66
124	September 3	@ Reds	6–7	Mitchell	**Mamaux** (19–10)	—	—	56–67
125	September 4	Cardinals	7–0	**Miller** (7–9)	Meadows	—	5,000	57–67
126	September 4	Cardinals	2–0	**Cooper** (11–6)	Watson	—	12,000	58–67
127	September 6	Cardinals	3–2	**Kantlehner** (5–14)	Steele	—	—	59–67
128	September 6	Cardinals	6–3	**Harmon** (8–11)	Ames	—	3,500	60–67
129	September 7	Cubs	5–4	**Mamaux** (20–10)	Packard	**Cooper** (2)	—	61–67
130	September 9	Cubs	0–3	Vaughn	**Kantlehner** (5–15)	—	—	61–68
131	September 9	Cubs	0–2	Lavender	**Cooper** (11–7)	—	12,000	61–69
132	September 10	@ Cubs	8–7	**Grimes** (1–0)	Prendergast	**Mamaux** (2)	—	62–69
133	September 12	@ Robins	0–6	Pfeffer	**Evans** (2–2)	—	—	62–70
134	September 12	@ Robins	2–1	**Mamaux** (21–10)	Coombs	—	10,000	63–70
135	September 13	@ Robins	6–3	**Cooper** (12–7)	Smith	—	—	64–70
136	September 14	@ Robins	2–3	Cheney	**Grimes** (1–1)	—	—	64–71
137	September 15	@ Robins	1–8 (5)	Marquard	**Jacobs** (6–8)	—	—	64–72
138	September 16	@ Giants	2–8	Benton	**Mamaux** (21–11)	—	—	64–73
139	September 16	@ Giants	3–4	Tesreau	**Cooper** (12–8)	—	—	64–74
140	September 18	@ Giants	0–2	Schupp	**Miller** (7–10)	—	—	64–75
141	September 18	@ Giants	1–1 (8)			—	—	64–75
142	September 19	@ Giants	2–9	Benton	**Jacobs** (6–9)	—	—	64–76
143	September 19	@ Giants	1–5	Tesreau	**Evans** (2–3)	—	—	64–77
144	September 20	@ Phillies	0–7	Demaree	**Cooper** (12–9)	—	—	64–78
145	September 20	@ Phillies	2–3	Demaree	**Mamaux** (21–12)	—	—	64–79
146	September 21	@ Phillies	8–3	**Grimes** (2–1)	Rixey	—	—	65–79
147	September 22	@ Phillies	4–7	Mayer	**Evans** (2–4)	—	—	65–80
148	September 23	@ Braves	2–4	Rudolph	**Mamaux** (21–13)	—	—	65–81
149	September 23	@ Braves	1–1 (13)			—	—	65–81
150	September 25	@ Braves	0–5	Tyler	**Grimes** (2–2)	—	—	65–82
151	September 25	@ Braves	2–3	Reulbach	**Mamaux** (21–14)	—	—	65–83
152	September 26	@ Braves	0–3	Nehf	**Evans** (2–5)	—	—	65–84
153	September 26	@ Braves	1–2	Allen	**Jacobs** (6–10)	—	—	65–85
154	September 27	@ Braves	0–1	Tyler	**Cooper** (12–10)	—	—	65–86
155	September 30	Reds	4–5	Mitchell	**Mamaux** (21–15)	—	—	65–87

October: 0–1 (Home: 0–0; Away: 0–1)

#	Date	Opponent	Score	Win	Loss	Save	Attendance	Record
157	October 1	@ Reds	0–4	Toney	**Cooper** (12–11)	—	—	65–89

Legend: = Win = Loss = Tie
Bold = Pirates team member

=== Roster ===
1916 Pittsburgh Pirates
**Roster**
**Pitchers**: Babe Adams; Paul Carpenter; Wilbur Cooper; Bill Evans; Burleigh Grimes; Bob Harmon; Carmen Hill; Elmer Jacobs; Erv Kantlehner; Al Mamaux; Frank Miller; Jack Scott	**Catchers**: William Fischer; George Gibson; Walter Schmidt; Bill Wagner; Art Wilson; **Infielders**: Doug Baird; Carson Bigbee; Jack Farmer; Billy Gleason; Newt Halliday; Doc Johnston; Otto Knabe; Ike McAuley; Alex McCarthy; Joe Schultz; Paddy Siglin; Jimmy Smith; Frank Smykal; Jim Viox; Honus Wagner; Hooks Warner	**Outfielders**: Jesse Altenburg; Ed Barney; Max Carey; Pete Compton; Dan Costello; Bill Hinchman; Lee King; Ray O'Brien; Wildfire Schulte; **Other batters**: Bill Batsch; Wilbur Fisher; Gene Madden	**Manager**: Nixey Callahan

== Player stats ==
=== Batting ===
==== Starters by position ====
Note: Pos = Position; G = Games played; AB = At bats; H = Hits; Avg. = Batting average; HR = Home runs; RBI = Runs batted in

Pos	Player	G	AB	H	Avg.	HR	RBI
C	Walter Schmidt	64	184	35	.190	2	15
1B	Doc Johnston	114	404	86	.213	0	39
2B	Jack Farmer	55	166	45	.271	0	14
SS	Honus Wagner	123	432	124	.287	1	39
3B	Doug Baird	128	430	93	.216	1	28
OF	Bill Hinchman	152	555	175	.315	4	76
OF	Frank Schulte	55	177	45	.254	0	14
OF	Max Carey	154	599	158	.264	7	42

==== Other batters ====
Note: G = Games played; AB = At bats; H = Hits; Avg. = Batting average; HR = Home runs; RBI = Runs batted in

Player	G	AB	H	Avg.	HR	RBI
Joe Schultz	77	204	53	.260	0	22
Hooks Warner	44	168	40	.238	2	14
Carson Bigbee	43	164	41	.250	0	3
Dan Costello	60	159	38	.239	0	8
Alex McCarthy	50	146	29	.199	0	3
Ed Barney	45	137	27	.197	0	9
Jim Viox	43	132	33	.250	1	17
Art Wilson	53	128	33	.258	1	12
William Fischer	42	113	29	.257	1	6
Jimmy Smith	36	96	18	.188	0	5
Otto Knabe	28	89	17	.191	0	9
George Gibson	33	84	17	.202	0	4
Ray O'Brien	16	57	12	.211	0	3
Bill Wagner	19	38	9	.237	0	2
Lee King	8	18	2	.111	0	1
Pete Compton	5	16	1	.063	0	0
Jesse Altenburg	8	14	6	.429	0	0
Frank Smykal	6	10	3	.300	0	2
Ike McAuley	4	8	2	.250	0	1
Paddy Siglin	3	4	1	.250	0	0
Billy Gleason	1	2	0	.000	0	0
Newt Halliday	1	1	0	.000	0	0
Gene Madden	1	1	0	.000	0	0
Wilbur Fisher	1	1	0	.000	0	0
Bill Batsch	1	0	0	----	0	0

=== Pitching ===
==== Starting pitchers ====
Note: G = Games pitched; IP = Innings pitched; W = Wins; L = Losses; ERA = Earned run average; SO = Strikeouts

Player	G	IP	W	L	ERA	SO
Al Mamaux	45	310.0	21	15	2.53	163
Wilbur Cooper	42	246.0	12	11	1.87	111
Frank Miller	30	173.0	7	10	2.29	88
Burleigh Grimes	6	45.2	2	3	2.36	20

==== Other pitchers ====
Note: G = Games pitched; IP = Innings pitched; W = Wins; L = Losses; ERA = Earned run average; SO = Strikeouts

Player	G	IP	W	L	ERA	SO
Bob Harmon	31	172.2	8	11	2.81	62
Erv Kantlehner	34	165.0	5	15	3.16	49
Elmer Jacobs	34	153.0	6	10	2.94	46
Babe Adams	16	72.1	2	9	5.72	22
Bill Evans	13	63.0	2	5	3.00	21

==== Relief pitchers ====
Note: G = Games pitched; W = Wins; L = Losses; SV = Saves; ERA = Earned run average; SO = Strikeouts

Player	G	IP	W	L	ERA	SO
Paul Carpenter	5	0	0	0	1.17	5
Carmen Hill	2	0	0	0	8.53	5
Jack Scott	1	0	0	0	10.80	4
