= 1916 New York Giants season =

1916 New York Giants
- League: National League
- Ballpark: Polo Grounds
- City: New York City
- Record: 86–66 (.566)
- League place: 4th
- Owners: Harry Hempstead
- Managers: John McGraw

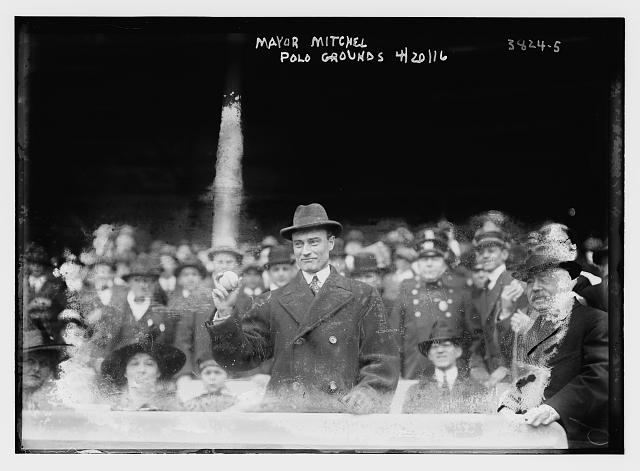
John Purroy Mitchel, the Mayor of New York throwing out the ceremonial first pitch at the Opening Day game of the 1916 New York Giants season at the Polo Grounds on April 20, 1916

The 1916 New York Giants season was the franchise's 34th season. The team finished in fourth place in the National League with an 86–66 record, seven games behind the Brooklyn Robins. This season introduced a new uniform design.

== Opening day games ==
The first game of the home season was on April 20, 1916, at the Polo Grounds. John Purroy Mitchel threw the ceremonial first pitch.

== Regular season ==
The 1916 Giants set a still-standing Major League record for the longest winning streak at 26 games between September 7 to 30. Earlier in the season, the Giants had won 17 consecutive games. Despite the winning streaks, no Giants pitcher won 20 games.

For the only time in franchise history, the Giants failed to score a run in a three-game series; they were shut out in all three games against St. Louis, August 20–22.

Former Federal League star Benny Kauff led the team in runs batted in and stolen bases.

=== Season standings ===
National League
Team	W	L	Pct.	GB	Home	Road
Brooklyn Robins	94	60	.610	—	50‍–‍27	44‍–‍33
Philadelphia Phillies	91	62	.595	2½	50‍–‍29	41‍–‍33
Boston Braves	89	63	.586	4	41‍–‍31	48‍–‍32
New York Giants	86	66	.566	7	47‍–‍30	39‍–‍36
Chicago Cubs	67	86	.438	26½	37‍–‍41	30‍–‍45
Pittsburgh Pirates	65	89	.422	29	37‍–‍40	28‍–‍49
St. Louis Cardinals	60	93	.392	33½	36‍–‍40	24‍–‍53
Cincinnati Reds	60	93	.392	33½	32‍–‍44	28‍–‍49

=== Record vs. opponents ===
1916 National League record Sources:
Team	BSN	BRO	CHC	CIN	NYG	PHI	PIT	STL
Boston	—	13–9	14–7–2	13–9–1	11–10–1	11–11–1	14–8–1	13–9
Brooklyn	9–13	—	15–7–1	15–7–1	15–7	11–11	14–8	15–7
Chicago	7–14–2	7–15–1	—	9–13	10–12	8–14	12–10	14–8
Cincinnati	9–13–1	7–15–1	13–9	—	5–16	5–17	13–9	8–14
New York	10–11–1	7–15	12–10	16–5	—	9–13	17–5–2	15–7
Philadelphia	11–11–1	11–11	14–8	17–5	13–9	—	13–9	12–9
Pittsburgh	8–14–1	8–14	10–12	9–13	5–17–2	9–13	—	16–6
St. Louis	9–13	7–15	8–14	14–8	7–15	9–12	6–16	—

=== Notable transactions ===
- August 28, 1916: Larry Doyle, Merwin Jacobson, and Herb Hunter were traded by the Giants to the Chicago Cubs for Heinie Zimmerman and Mickey Doolan.

=== Roster ===
1916 New York Giants
Roster
Pitchers: Fred Anderson; Rube Benton; Christy Mathewson; Emilio Palmero; Pol Perritt; Hank Ritter; Slim Sallee; Rube Schauer; Ferdie Schupp; George Smith; Sailor Stroud; Jeff Tesreau	Catchers: Red Dooin; Duke Kelleher; Brad Kocher; Lew McCarty; Bill Rariden; Infielders: Fred Brainard; Mickey Doolan; Larry Doyle; Art Fletcher; Buck Herzog; Walter Holke; Herb Hunter; George Kelly; Hans Lobert; Bill McKechnie; Fred Merkle; Heinie Zimmerman	Outfielders: George Burns; Benny Kauff; Dave Robertson; Edd Roush; Other batters: Red Killefer; José Rodríguez; Heinie Stafford; Lew Wendell	Manager: John McGraw

== Player stats ==
=== Batting ===
==== Starters by position ====
Note: Pos = Position; G = Games played; AB = At bats; H = Hits; Avg. = Batting average; HR = Home runs; RBI = Runs batted in

Pos	Player	G	AB	H	Avg.	HR	RBI
C	Bill Rariden	120	351	78	.222	1	29
1B	Fred Merkle	112	401	95	.237	7	44
2B	Larry Doyle	113	441	118	.268	2	47
3B	Bill McKechnie	71	260	64	.246	0	17
SS	Art Fletcher	133	500	143	.286	3	66
OF	Benny Kauff	154	552	146	.264	9	74
OF	Dave Robertson	150	587	180	.307	12	69
OF	George Burns	155	623	174	.279	5	41

==== Other batters ====
Note: G = Games played; AB = At bats; H = Hits; Avg. = Batting average; HR = Home runs; RBI = Runs batted in

Player	G	AB	H	Avg.	HR	RBI
Buck Herzog	77	280	73	.261	0	25
Heinie Zimmerman	40	151	41	.272	0	19
Walter Holke	34	111	39	.351	0	13
Hans Lobert	48	76	17	.224	0	11
George Kelly	49	76	12	.158	0	3
Edd Roush	39	69	13	.188	0	5
Lew McCarty	25	68	27	.397	0	9
Brad Kocher	34	65	7	.108	0	1
Mickey Doolan	18	51	12	.235	1	3
Herb Hunter	21	28	7	.250	1	4
Red Dooin	15	17	2	.118	0	0
Fred Brainard	2	7	0	.000	0	0
Lew Wendell	2	2	0	.000	0	0
Red Killefer	2	1	1	1.000	0	1
Heinie Stafford	1	1	0	.000	0	0
José Rodríguez	1	0	0	----	0	0
Duke Kelleher	1	0	0	----	0	0

=== Pitching ===
==== Starting pitchers ====
Note: G = Games pitched; IP = Innings pitched; W = Wins; L = Losses; ERA = Earned run average; SO = Strikeouts

Player	G	IP	W	L	ERA	SO
Jeff Tesreau	40	268.1	18	14	2.92	113
Pol Perritt	40	251.0	18	11	2.62	115
Rube Benton	38	238.2	16	8	2.87	115
Fred Anderson	38	188.0	9	13	3.40	98
Slim Sallee	15	111.2	9	4	1.37	35

==== Other pitchers ====
Note: G = Games pitched; IP = Innings pitched; W = Wins; L = Losses; ERA = Earned run average; SO = Strikeouts

Player	G	IP	W	L	ERA	SO
Ferdie Schupp	30	140.1	9	3	0.90	86
Christy Mathewson	12	65.2	3	4	2.33	16
Sailor Stroud	10	46.2	1	2	2.70	16
Rube Schauer	19	45.2	1	4	2.96	24
Emilio Palmero	4	15.2	0	3	8.04	8

==== Relief pitchers ====
Note: G = Games pitched; W = Wins; L = Losses; SV = Saves; ERA = Earned run average; SO = Strikeouts

Player	G	W	L	SV	ERA	SO
George Smith	9	3	0	0	2.61	9
Hank Ritter	3	1	0	0	0.00	3

== Awards and honors ==
=== League top five finishers ===
George Burns

- NL leader in runs scored (105)
- 4th in NL in stolen bases (37)

Benny Kauff

- 2nd in NL in stolen bases (40)
- 4th in NL in RBI (74)

Dave Robertson

- MLB leader in home runs (12)
- 3rd in NL in runs scored (88)
