= 1916 Chicago Cubs season =

1916 Chicago Cubs
- League: National League
- Ballpark: Weeghman Park
- City: Chicago
- Record: 67–86 (.438)
- League place: 5th
- Owners: Charles Phelps Taft, Charles Weeghman
- Managers: Joe Tinker

The 1916 Chicago Cubs season was the 45th season of the Chicago Cubs franchise, the 41st in the National League and the first at Wrigley Field (then known as "Weeghman Park"). The Cubs finished fifth in the National League with a record of 67–86.

== Regular season ==
=== Season standings ===
National League
Team	W	L	Pct.	GB	Home	Road
Brooklyn Robins	94	60	.610	—	50‍–‍27	44‍–‍33
Philadelphia Phillies	91	62	.595	2½	50‍–‍29	41‍–‍33
Boston Braves	89	63	.586	4	41‍–‍31	48‍–‍32
New York Giants	86	66	.566	7	47‍–‍30	39‍–‍36
Chicago Cubs	67	86	.438	26½	37‍–‍41	30‍–‍45
Pittsburgh Pirates	65	89	.422	29	37‍–‍40	28‍–‍49
St. Louis Cardinals	60	93	.392	33½	36‍–‍40	24‍–‍53
Cincinnati Reds	60	93	.392	33½	32‍–‍44	28‍–‍49

=== Record vs. opponents ===
1916 National League record Sources:
Team	BSN	BRO	CHC	CIN	NYG	PHI	PIT	STL
Boston	—	13–9	14–7–2	13–9–1	11–10–1	11–11–1	14–8–1	13–9
Brooklyn	9–13	—	15–7–1	15–7–1	15–7	11–11	14–8	15–7
Chicago	7–14–2	7–15–1	—	9–13	10–12	8–14	12–10	14–8
Cincinnati	9–13–1	7–15–1	13–9	—	5–16	5–17	13–9	8–14
New York	10–11–1	7–15	12–10	16–5	—	9–13	17–5–2	15–7
Philadelphia	11–11–1	11–11	14–8	17–5	13–9	—	13–9	12–9
Pittsburgh	8–14–1	8–14	10–12	9–13	5–17–2	9–13	—	16–6
St. Louis	9–13	7–15	8–14	14–8	7–15	9–12	6–16	—

=== Notable transactions ===
- August 28, 1916: Heinie Zimmerman and Mickey Doolan were traded by the Cubs to the New York Giants for Larry Doyle, Merwin Jacobson, and Herb Hunter.

== Roster ==
1916 Chicago Cubs
Roster
Pitchers: Mordecai Brown; Paul Carter; Claude Hendrix; Jimmy Lavender; George McConnell; Gene Packard; Scott Perry; George Pierce; Mike Prendergast; Tom Seaton; Hippo Vaughn	Catchers: Nick Allen; Jimmy Archer; Clem Clemens; Rowdy Elliott; William Fischer; Johnny O'Connor; Bob O'Farrell; Art Wilson; Infielders: Charlie Deal; Mickey Doolan; Larry Doyle; Herb Hunter; Otto Knabe; Alex McCarthy; Fritz Mollwitz; Eddie Mulligan; Charlie Pechous; Vic Saier; Marty Shay; Joe Tinker; Chuck Wortman; Steve Yerkes; Rollie Zeider; Heinie Zimmerman	Outfielders: Max Flack; Solly Hofman; Merwin Jacobson; Joe Kelly; Les Mann; Wildfire Schulte; Earl Smith; Cy Williams; Dutch Zwilling; Other batters: Ed Sicking	Manager: Joe Tinker

== Player stats ==
=== Batting ===
==== Starters by position ====
Note: Pos = Position; G = Games played; AB = At bats; H = Hits; Avg. = Batting average; HR = Home runs; RBI = Runs batted in

Pos	Player	G	AB	H	Avg.	HR	RBI
C	Jimmy Archer	77	205	45	.220	1	30
1B	Vic Saier	147	498	126	.253	7	50
2B	Otto Knabe	51	145	40	.276	0	7
SS	Chuck Wortman	69	234	47	.201	2	16
3B	Heinie Zimmerman	107	398	116	.291	6	64
OF	Cy Williams	118	405	113	.279	12	66
OF	Leslie Mann	127	415	113	.272	2	29
OF	Max Flack	141	465	120	.258	3	20

==== Other batters ====
Note: G = Games played; AB = At bats; H = Hits; Avg. = Batting average; HR = Home runs; RBI = Runs batted in

Player	G	AB	H	Avg.	HR	RBI
Rollie Zeider	98	345	81	.235	1	22
Frank Schulte	72	230	68	.296	5	27
Eddie Mulligan	58	189	29	.153	0	9
William Fischer	65	179	35	.196	1	14
Joe Kelly	54	169	43	.254	2	15
Steve Yerkes	44	137	36	.263	1	10
Art Wilson	36	114	22	.193	0	5
Alex McCarthy	37	107	26	.243	0	6
Fritz Mollwitz	33	71	19	.268	0	11
Mickey Doolan	28	70	15	.214	0	5
Charlie Pechous	22	69	10	.145	0	4
Rowdy Elliott	23	55	14	.255	0	3
Dutch Zwilling	35	53	6	.113	1	8
Larry Doyle	9	38	15	.395	1	7
Earl Smith	14	27	7	.259	0	4
Solly Hofman	5	16	5	.313	0	2
Nick Allen	5	16	1	.063	0	1
Clem Clemens	10	15	0	.000	0	0
Merwin Jacobson	4	13	3	.231	0	0
Joe Tinker	7	10	1	.100	0	1
Charlie Deal	2	8	2	.250	0	3
Marty Shay	2	7	2	.286	0	0
Herb Hunter	2	4	0	.000	0	0
Ed Sicking	1	1	0	.000	0	0
Johnny O'Connor	1	0	0	----	0	0
Bob O'Farrell	1	0	0	----	0	0

=== Pitching ===
==== Starting pitchers ====
Note: G = Games pitched; IP = Innings pitched; W = Wins; L = Losses; ERA = Earned run average; SO = Strikeouts

Player	G	IP	W	L	ERA	SO
Hippo Vaughn	44	294.0	17	15	2.20	144
Claude Hendrix	36	218.0	8	16	2.68	117
Jimmy Lavender	36	188.0	10	14	2.82	91
George McConnell	28	171.1	4	12	2.57	82
Scott Perry	4	28.1	2	1	2.54	10

==== Other pitchers ====
Note: G = Games pitched; IP = Innings pitched; W = Wins; L = Losses; ERA = Earned run average; SO = Strikeouts

Player	G	IP	W	L	ERA	SO
Gene Packard	37	155.1	10	6	2.78	36
Mike Prendergast	35	152.0	6	11	2.31	56
Tom Seaton	31	121.0	6	6	3.27	45
Mordecai Brown	12	48.1	2	3	3.91	21
Paul Carter	8	36.0	2	2	2.75	14
George Pierce	4	4.1	0	0	2.08	0
