= 1916 Philadelphia Phillies season =

Major League Baseball season

1916 Philadelphia Phillies
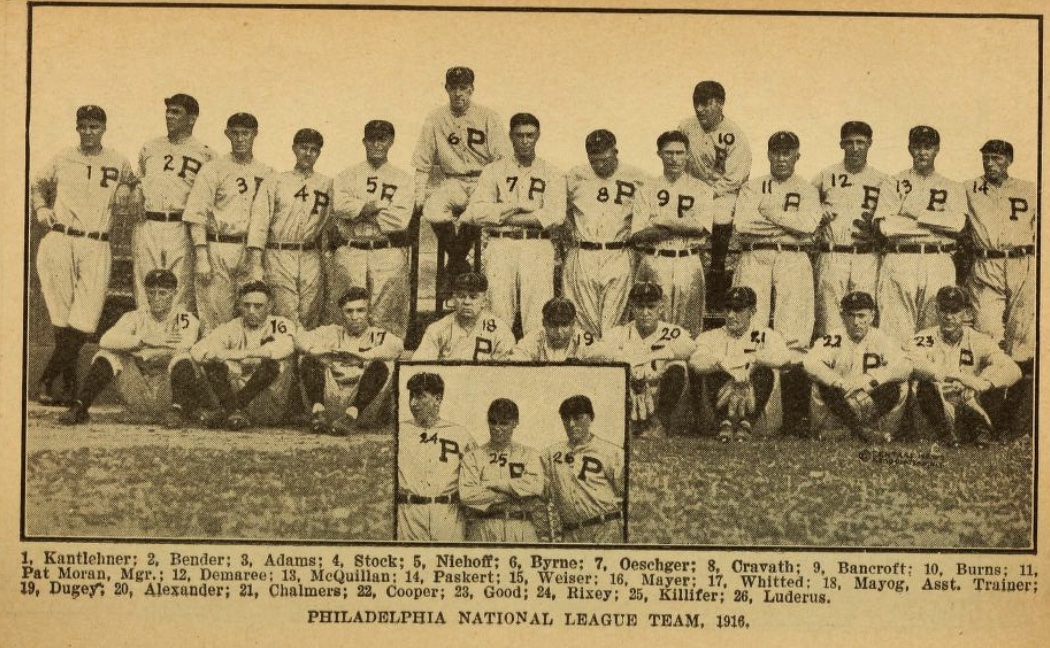
- 1916 Philadelphia Phillies
- League: National League
- Ballpark: National League Park
- City: Philadelphia, Pennsylvania
- Owners: William F. Baker
- Managers: Pat Moran

The following lists the events of the 1916 Philadelphia Phillies season.

== Regular season ==
=== Season standings ===
National League
Team	W	L	Pct.	GB	Home	Road
Brooklyn Robins	94	60	.610	—	50‍–‍27	44‍–‍33
Philadelphia Phillies	91	62	.595	2½	50‍–‍29	41‍–‍33
Boston Braves	89	63	.586	4	41‍–‍31	48‍–‍32
New York Giants	86	66	.566	7	47‍–‍30	39‍–‍36
Chicago Cubs	67	86	.438	26½	37‍–‍41	30‍–‍45
Pittsburgh Pirates	65	89	.422	29	37‍–‍40	28‍–‍49
St. Louis Cardinals	60	93	.392	33½	36‍–‍40	24‍–‍53
Cincinnati Reds	60	93	.392	33½	32‍–‍44	28‍–‍49

=== Record vs. opponents ===
1916 National League record Sources:
Team	BSN	BRO	CHC	CIN	NYG	PHI	PIT	STL
Boston	—	13–9	14–7–2	13–9–1	11–10–1	11–11–1	14–8–1	13–9
Brooklyn	9–13	—	15–7–1	15–7–1	15–7	11–11	14–8	15–7
Chicago	7–14–2	7–15–1	—	9–13	10–12	8–14	12–10	14–8
Cincinnati	9–13–1	7–15–1	13–9	—	5–16	5–17	13–9	8–14
New York	10–11–1	7–15	12–10	16–5	—	9–13	17–5–2	15–7
Philadelphia	11–11–1	11–11	14–8	17–5	13–9	—	13–9	12–9
Pittsburgh	8–14–1	8–14	10–12	9–13	5–17–2	9–13	—	16–6
St. Louis	9–13	7–15	8–14	14–8	7–15	9–12	6–16	—

=== Roster ===
1916 Philadelphia Phillies
Roster
Pitchers: Pete Alexander; Stan Baumgartner; Chief Bender; George Chalmers; Al Demaree; Gary Fortune; Erv Kantlehner; Erskine Mayer; George McQuillan; Joe Oeschger; Eppa Rixey	Catchers: Bert Adams; Ed Burns; Bill Killefer; Infielders: Dave Bancroft; Bobby Byrne; Oscar Dugey; Fred Luderus; Bert Niehoff; Milt Stock	Outfielders: Claude Cooper; Gavvy Cravath; Bob Gandy; Wilbur Good; Billy Maharg; Dode Paskert; Bud Weiser; Possum Whitted; Other batters: Ben Tincup	Manager: Pat Moran

== Player stats ==
=== Batting ===
==== Starters by position ====
Note: Pos = Position; G = Games played; AB = At bats; H = Hits; Avg. = Batting average; HR = Home runs; RBI = Runs batted in

Pos	Player	G	AB	H	Avg.	HR	RBI
C	Bill Killefer	97	286	62	.217	3	27
1B	Fred Luderus	146	508	143	.281	5	53
2B	Bert Niehoff	146	548	133	.243	4	61
SS	Dave Bancroft	142	477	101	.212	3	33
3B	Milt Stock	132	509	143	.281	1	43
OF	Dode Paskert	149	555	155	.279	8	46
OF	Gavvy Cravath	137	448	127	.283	11	70
OF	Possum Whitted	147	526	148	.281	6	68

==== Other batters ====
Note: G = Games played; AB = At bats; H = Hits; Avg. = Batting average; HR = Home runs; RBI = Runs batted in

Player	G	AB	H	Avg.	HR	RBI
Ed Burns	78	219	51	.233	0	14
Bobby Byrne	48	141	33	.234	0	9
Wilbur Good	75	136	34	.250	1	15
Oscar Dugey	41	50	11	.220	0	1
Bert Adams	11	13	3	.231	0	1
Bud Weiser	4	10	3	.300	0	1
Bob Gandy	1	2	0	.000	0	0
Ben Tincup	1	1	0	.000	0	0
Billy Maharg	1	1	0	.000	0	0

=== Pitching ===
==== Starting pitchers ====
Note: G = Games pitched; IP = Innings pitched; W = Wins; L = Losses; ERA = Earned run average; SO = Strikeouts

Player	G	IP	W	L	ERA	SO
Pete Alexander	48	389.0	33	12	1.55	167
Eppa Rixey	38	287.0	22	10	1.85	134
Al Demaree	39	285.0	19	14	2.62	130
Gary Fortune	1	5.0	0	1	3.60	3

==== Other pitchers ====
Note: G = Games pitched; IP = Innings pitched; W = Wins; L = Losses; ERA = Earned run average; SO = Strikeouts

Player	G	IP	W	L	ERA	SO
Erskine Mayer	28	140.0	7	7	3.15	62
Chief Bender	27	122.2	7	7	3.74	43
George Chalmers	12	53.2	1	4	3.19	21

==== Relief pitchers ====
Note: G = Games pitched; W = Wins; L = Losses; SV = Saves; ERA = Earned run average; SO = Strikeouts

Player	G	W	L	SV	ERA	SO
George McQuillan	21	1	7	2	2.76	22
Joe Oeschger	14	1	0	0	2.37	17
Erv Kantlehner	3	0	0	0	9.00	2
Stan Baumgartner	1	0	0	0	2.25	0
