= 1916 St. Louis Cardinals season =

Major League Baseball season

1916 St. Louis Cardinals
- League: National League
- Ballpark: Robison Field
- City: St. Louis, Missouri
- Record: 60–93 (.392)
- League place: T-7th
- Owners: Helene Hathaway Britton
- Managers: Miller Huggins

The 1916 St. Louis Cardinals season was the team's 35th season in St. Louis, Missouri and its 25th season in the National League. The Cardinals went 60–93 during the season and finished tied for seventh and last in the National League.

Rogers Hornsby became a regular in the Cardinals lineup starting in 1916. Hornsby played at least one game at each infield position. He immediately established himself as one of the league's leading hitters, finishing the 1916 season fourth in the batting race with a .313 average, and smacking 15 triples, one short of the league's lead.

== Regular season ==
=== Season standings ===
National League
Team	W	L	Pct.	GB	Home	Road
Brooklyn Robins	94	60	.610	—	50‍–‍27	44‍–‍33
Philadelphia Phillies	91	62	.595	2½	50‍–‍29	41‍–‍33
Boston Braves	89	63	.586	4	41‍–‍31	48‍–‍32
New York Giants	86	66	.566	7	47‍–‍30	39‍–‍36
Chicago Cubs	67	86	.438	26½	37‍–‍41	30‍–‍45
Pittsburgh Pirates	65	89	.422	29	37‍–‍40	28‍–‍49
St. Louis Cardinals	60	93	.392	33½	36‍–‍40	24‍–‍53
Cincinnati Reds	60	93	.392	33½	32‍–‍44	28‍–‍49

=== Record vs. opponents ===
1916 National League record Sources:
Team	BSN	BRO	CHC	CIN	NYG	PHI	PIT	STL
Boston	—	13–9	14–7–2	13–9–1	11–10–1	11–11–1	14–8–1	13–9
Brooklyn	9–13	—	15–7–1	15–7–1	15–7	11–11	14–8	15–7
Chicago	7–14–2	7–15–1	—	9–13	10–12	8–14	12–10	14–8
Cincinnati	9–13–1	7–15–1	13–9	—	5–16	5–17	13–9	8–14
New York	10–11–1	7–15	12–10	16–5	—	9–13	17–5–2	15–7
Philadelphia	11–11–1	11–11	14–8	17–5	13–9	—	13–9	12–9
Pittsburgh	8–14–1	8–14	10–12	9–13	5–17–2	9–13	—	16–6
St. Louis	9–13	7–15	8–14	14–8	7–15	9–12	6–16	—

=== Roster ===
1916 St. Louis Cardinals
Roster
Pitchers: Red Ames; Murphy Currie; Bill Doak; Dan Griner; Charley Hall; Hi Jasper; Joe Lotz; Lee Meadows; Slim Sallee; Bob Steele; Cy Warmoth; Milt Watson; Steamboat Williams	Catchers: Tony Brottem; Mike González; Frank Snyder; Infielders: Zinn Beck; Bruno Betzel; Sam Bohne; Roy Corhan; Rogers Hornsby; Miller Huggins; Dots Miller; Stuffy Stewart	Outfielders: Bob Bescher; Art Butler; Walton Cruise; Tom Long; Jack Smith; Chief Wilson	Manager: Miller Huggins; Coaches: Charley O'Leary

== Player stats ==
=== Batting ===
==== Starters by position ====
Note: Pos = Position; G = Games played; AB = At bats; H = Hits; Avg. = Batting average; HR = Home runs; RBI = Runs batted in

Pos	Player	G	AB	H	Avg.	HR	RBI
C	Mike González	118	331	79	.239	0	29
1B	Dots Miller	143	505	120	.238	1	46
2B	Bruno Betzel	142	510	119	.233	1	37
SS	Roy Corhan	92	295	62	.210	0	18
3B	Rogers Hornsby	139	495	155	.313	6	65
OF	Bob Bescher	151	561	132	.235	6	43
OF	Jack Smith	130	357	87	.244	6	34
OF	Chief Wilson	120	355	85	.239	3	32

==== Other batters ====
Note: G = Games played; AB = At bats; H = Hits; Avg. = Batting average; HR = Home runs; RBI = Runs batted in

Player	G	AB	H	Avg.	HR	RBI
Frank Snyder	132	406	105	.259	0	39
Tom Long	119	403	118	.293	1	33
Zinn Beck	62	184	41	.223	0	10
Art Butler	86	110	23	.209	0	7
Sam Bohne	14	38	9	.237	0	0
Tony Brottem	26	33	6	.182	0	4
Stuffy Stewart	9	17	3	.176	0	1
Miller Huggins	18	9	3	.333	0	0
Walton Cruise	3	3	2	.667	0	0

=== Pitching ===
==== Starting pitchers ====
Note: G = Games pitched; IP = Innings pitched; W = Wins; L = Losses; ERA = Earned run average; SO = Strikeouts

Player	G	IP	W	L	ERA	SO
Lee Meadows	51	289.0	12	23	2.58	120
Bill Doak	29	192.0	12	8	2.63	82
Bob Steele	29	148.0	5	15	3.41	67
Milt Watson	18	103.0	4	6	3.06	27

==== Other pitchers ====
Note: G = Games pitched; IP = Innings pitched; W = Wins; L = Losses; ERA = Earned run average; SO = Strikeouts

Player	G	IP	W	L	ERA	SO
Red Ames	45	228.0	11	16	2.64	98
Hi Jasper	21	107.0	5	6	3.28	37
Steamboat Williams	36	105.0	6	7	4.20	25
Slim Sallee	16	70.0	5	5	3.47	28
Charley Hall	10	42.2	0	4	5.48	15
Joe Lotz	12	40.0	0	3	4.28	18

==== Relief pitchers ====
Note: G = Games pitched; W = Wins; L = Losses; SV = Saves; ERA = Earned run average; SO = Strikeouts

Player	G	W	L	SV	ERA	SO
Murphy Currie	6	0	0	0	1.88	8
Dan Griner	4	0	0	0	4.09	3
Cy Warmoth	3	0	0	0	14.40	1
