= 1916 Brooklyn Robins season =

1916 Brooklyn Robins
- National League champions
- League: National League
- Ballpark: Ebbets Field
- City: Brooklyn, New York
- Record: 94–60 (.610)
- League place: 1st
- Owners: Charles Ebbets, Ed McKeever, Stephen McKeever
- President: Charles Ebbets
- Managers: Wilbert Robinson

The 1916 Brooklyn Robins won their first National League pennant in 16 years and advanced to the first World Series in franchise history, where they lost to Babe Ruth and the Boston Red Sox in five games.

== Offseason ==
- February 10, 1916: Jim Hickman was purchased by the Robins from the Baltimore Terrapins.
- February 10, 1916: Mike Mowrey was purchased by the Robins from the Pittsburgh Rebels.

== Regular season ==
=== Season standings ===
National League
Team	W	L	Pct.	GB	Home	Road
Brooklyn Robins	94	60	.610	—	50‍–‍27	44‍–‍33
Philadelphia Phillies	91	62	.595	2½	50‍–‍29	41‍–‍33
Boston Braves	89	63	.586	4	41‍–‍31	48‍–‍32
New York Giants	86	66	.566	7	47‍–‍30	39‍–‍36
Chicago Cubs	67	86	.438	26½	37‍–‍41	30‍–‍45
Pittsburgh Pirates	65	89	.422	29	37‍–‍40	28‍–‍49
St. Louis Cardinals	60	93	.392	33½	36‍–‍40	24‍–‍53
Cincinnati Reds	60	93	.392	33½	32‍–‍44	28‍–‍49

=== Record vs. opponents ===
1916 National League record Sources:
Team	BSN	BRO	CHC	CIN	NYG	PHI	PIT	STL
Boston	—	13–9	14–7–2	13–9–1	11–10–1	11–11–1	14–8–1	13–9
Brooklyn	9–13	—	15–7–1	15–7–1	15–7	11–11	14–8	15–7
Chicago	7–14–2	7–15–1	—	9–13	10–12	8–14	12–10	14–8
Cincinnati	9–13–1	7–15–1	13–9	—	5–16	5–17	13–9	8–14
New York	10–11–1	7–15	12–10	16–5	—	9–13	17–5–2	15–7
Philadelphia	11–11–1	11–11	14–8	17–5	13–9	—	13–9	12–9
Pittsburgh	8–14–1	8–14	10–12	9–13	5–17–2	9–13	—	16–6
St. Louis	9–13	7–15	8–14	14–8	7–15	9–12	6–16	—

=== Notable transactions ===
- August 25, 1916: Lew McCarty was traded by the Robins to the New York Giants for Fred Merkle.

=== Roster ===
1916 Brooklyn Robins
Roster
Pitchers: Ed Appleton; Leon Cadore; Larry Cheney; Jack Coombs; Wheezer Dell; Duster Mails; Rube Marquard; Jeff Pfeffer; Nap Rucker; Sherry Smith	Catchers: Artie Dede; Lew McCarty; Chief Meyers; Otto Miller; Mack Wheat; Infielders: George Cutshaw; Jake Daubert; Bunny Fabrique; Gus Getz; John Kelleher; Fred Merkle; Mike Mowrey; Ollie O'Mara; Ivy Olson; Red Smyth	Outfielders: Jim Hickman; Jimmy Johnston; Hack Miller; Hy Myers; Al Nixon; Casey Stengel; Zack Wheat	Manager: Wilbert Robinson

== Player stats ==
= Indicates team leader

=== Batting ===
==== Starters by position ====
Note: Pos = Position; G = Games played; AB = At bats; R = Runs; H = Hits; Avg. = Batting average; HR = Home runs; RBI = Runs batted in; SB = Stolen bases

Pos	Player	G	AB	R	H	Avg.	HR	RBI	SB
C	Chief Meyers	80	239	21	59	.247	0	21	2
1B	Jake Daubert	127	478	75	151	.316	3	33	21
2B	George Cutshaw	154	581	58	151	.260	2	63	27
3B	Mike Mowrey	144	495	57	121	.244	0	60	16
SS	Ivy Olson	108	351	29	89	.254	1	38	14
OF	Zack Wheat	149	568	76	177	.312	9	73	19
OF	Casey Stengel	127	462	66	129	.279	8	53	11
OF	Jimmy Johnston	118	425	58	107	.252	1	26	22

==== Other batters ====
Note: G = Games played; AB = At bats; R = Runs; H = Hits; Avg. = Batting average; HR = Home runs; RBI = Runs batted in; SB = Stolen bases

Player	G	AB	R	H	Avg.	HR	RBI	SB
Hy Myers	113	412	54	108	.262	3	36	17
Otto Miller	73	216	16	55	.255	1	17	6
Ollie O'Mara	72	193	18	39	.202	0	15	10
Lew McCarty	55	150	17	47	.313	0	13	4
Gus Getz	40	96	9	21	.219	0	8	9
Fred Merkle	23	69	6	16	.232	0	2	2
Jim Hickman	9	5	3	1	.200	0	0	1
Red Smyth	2	5	0	0	.000	0	0	0
John Kelleher	2	3	0	0	.000	0	0	0
Hack Miller	3	3	0	1	.333	0	1	0
Bunny Fabrique	2	2	0	0	.000	0	0	0
Al Nixon	1	2	0	2	1.000	0	0	0
Mack Wheat	2	2	0	0	.000	0	0	0
Artie Dede	1	1	0	0	.000	0	0	0

=== Pitching ===
==== Starting pitchers ====
Note: G = Games pitched; GS = Games started; CG = Complete games; IP = Innings pitched; W = Wins; L = Losses; ERA = Earned run average; BB = Bases on balls; SO = Strikeouts

Player	G	GS	CG	IP	W	L	ERA	BB	SO
Jeff Pfeffer	41	36	30	328.2	25	11	1.92	63	128
Larry Cheney	41	32	15	253.0	18	12	1.92	105	166
Jack Coombs	27	19	10	159.0	13	8	2.66	44	47

==== Other pitchers ====
Note: G = Games pitched; GS = Games started; CG = Complete games; IP = Innings pitched; W = Wins; L = Losses; ERA = Earned run average; BB = Bases on balls; SO = Strikeouts

Player	G	GS	CG	IP	W	L	ERA	BB	SO
Sherry Smith	36	25	15	219.0	14	10	2.34	45	67
Rube Marquard	36	21	15	205.0	13	6	1.58	38	107
Wheezer Dell	32	16	9	155.0	8	9	2.26	43	76
Ed Appleton	14	3	2	47.0	1	2	3.06	18	14
Nap Rucker	9	4	1	37.1	2	1	1.69	7	14

Note: Rube Marquard was team leader in saves with 5.

==== Relief pitchers ====
Note: G = Games pitched; IP = Innings pitched; W = Wins; L = Losses; SV = Saves; ERA = Earned run average; BB = Bases on balls; SO = Strikeouts

Player	G	IP	W	L	SV	ERA	BB	SO
Duster Mails	11	17.1	0	1	0	3.63	9	13
Leon Cadore	1	6.0	0	0	0	4.50	0	2

== 1916 World Series ==
=== Game 1 ===
October 7, 1916, at Braves Field in Boston, Massachusetts

Team	1	2	3	4	5	6	7	8	9	R	H	E
Brooklyn	0	0	0	1	0	0	0	0	4	5	10	4
Boston	0	0	1	0	1	0	3	1	x	6	8	1
W: Ernie Shore (1–0) L: Rube Marquard (0–1) S: Carl Mays (1)

=== Game 2 ===
October 9, 1916, at Braves Field in Boston, Massachusetts

Team	1	2	3	4	5	6	7	8	9	10	11	12	13	14	R	H	E
Brooklyn	1	0	0	0	0	0	0	0	0	0	0	0	0	0	1	6	2
Boston	0	0	1	0	0	0	0	0	0	0	0	0	0	1	2	7	1
W: Babe Ruth (1–0) L: Sherry Smith (0–1)
HR: BRO – Hy Myers (1)

=== Game 3 ===
October 10, 1916, at Ebbets Field in Brooklyn, New York

Team	1	2	3	4	5	6	7	8	9	R	H	E
Boston	0	0	0	0	0	2	1	0	0	3	7	1
Brooklyn	0	0	1	1	2	0	0	0	x	4	10	0
W: Jack Coombs (1–0) L: Carl Mays (0–1) S: Jeff Pfeffer (1)
HR: BOS – Larry Gardner (1)

=== Game 4 ===
October 11, 1916, at Ebbets Field in Brooklyn, New York

Team	1	2	3	4	5	6	7	8	9	R	H	E
Boston	0	3	0	1	1	0	1	0	0	6	10	1
Brooklyn	2	0	0	0	0	0	0	0	0	2	5	4
W: Dutch Leonard (1–0) L: Rube Marquard (0–2)
HR: BOS – Larry Gardner (2)

=== Game 5 ===
October 12, 1916, at Braves Field in Boston, Massachusetts

Team	1	2	3	4	5	6	7	8	9	R	H	E
Brooklyn	0	1	0	0	0	0	0	0	0	1	3	3
Boston	0	1	2	0	1	0	0	0	x	4	7	2
W: Ernie Shore (2–0) L: Jeff Pfeffer (0–1)

== Awards and honors ==
=== League top five finishers ===
Larry Cheney

- #2 in NL in strikeouts (166)

Jake Daubert

- #2 in NL in batting average (.316)
- #4 in NL in on-base percentage (.371)

Rube Marquard

- #2 in NL in ERA (1.58)

Jeff Pfeffer

- #2 in NL in wins (25)
- #2 in NL in complete games (30)

Zach Wheat

- Led NL in slugging percentage (.461)
- #2 in NL in doubles (32)
