= Artie Dede =

American baseball player (1895-1971)

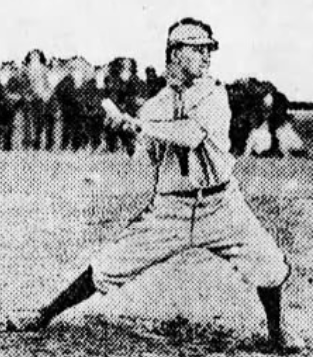
- Dede playing in a youth baseball game in Brooklyn in 1911
- Catcher
- Born: July 12, 1895; Brooklyn, New York
- Died: September 6, 1971 (aged 76); Keene, New Hampshire
- Batted: Right Threw: Right

MLB debut
- October 4, 1916, for the Brooklyn Robins

Last MLB appearance
- October 4, 1916, for the Brooklyn Robins

MLB statistics
- Batting average: .000
- Home runs: 0
- Runs batted in: 0
- Stats at Baseball Reference

Teams
- Brooklyn Robins (1916)

Arthur Richard Dede (July 12, 1895 – September 6, 1971) was a professional baseball player who played catcher in one game for the 1916 Brooklyn Robins. Dede was a local Brooklynite semi-pro catcher who had been traveling with the team to catch batting practice. He got into the only Major League game of his career when third-string Brooklyn catcher Mack Wheat broke a finger in the sixth inning of the season's penultimate game. He caught the final three innings with Leon Cadore pitching.

After his playing career ended, he was a scout for the Brooklyn Dodgers from 1947 to 1957 and the New York Yankees from 1958 to 1971.
