= Paul Carpenter =

Paul Carpenter may refer to:

- Paul Carpenter (actor) (1921–1964), Canadian actor and singer
- Paul Carpenter (baseball) (1894–1968), minor league baseball player
- Paul B. Carpenter (1928–2002), American politician

== See also ==
- Paul Carpenter Standley (1884–1963), American botanist
