= Bill Batsch =

American baseball player (1892–1963)

- Pinch hitter
- Born: May 18, 1892; Mingo Junction, Ohio
- Died: December 31, 1963 (aged 71); Canton, Ohio
- Batted: Right Threw: Right

MLB debut
- September 9, 1916, for the Pittsburgh Pirates

Last MLB appearance
- September 9, 1916, for the Pittsburgh Pirates

MLB statistics
- Games played: 1
- Plate appearances: 1
- Base on balls: 1
- Stats at Baseball Reference

Teams
- Pittsburgh Pirates (1916)

William McKinley Batsch (May 18, 1892 – December 31, 1963) was an American Major League Baseball player who pinch hit in one game for the Pittsburgh Pirates in 1916. Batsch is one of only five players to walk in his only major league plate appearance and never play the field, the most famous of which is Eddie Gaedel.

== Career ==
The pride of Mingo Junction, Ohio, Batsch attended Bethany College in Bethany, West Virginia. By 1916, Batsch, a right-handed outfielder, was with the "Pittsburgh Collegians" (presumably the University of Pittsburgh team) when the Pirates took a flyer on him. On September 9, 1916, the hometown Pirates were down 3–0 in the bottom of the eighth to the Chicago Cubs when Batsch came on to bat for pitcher Erv Kantlehner. Drawing a base on balls on a 3-2 pitch from Chicago hurler Hippo Vaughn, Batsch went to second on a ground out by Hooks Warner. When the next batter, Max Carey bounced one down to third baseman Rollie Zeider, Batsch rounded third when Zeider bobbled the ball and made a low throw to first. Fritz Mollwitz then rifled the ball to catcher Jimmy Archer, who tagged Batsch out at the plate, ending the 24-year-old's lone MLB appearance. (And presumably Batsch's only appearance in a pro baseball game, as he is not listed as having played in the minors.)

Bill Batsch died on New Year's Eve, 1963, in Canton, Ohio.
