= 1916 Boston Braves season =

1916 Boston Braves
- League: National League
- Ballpark: Braves Field
- City: Boston, Massachusetts
- Record: 89–63 (.586)
- League place: 3rd
- Owners: Percy Haughton
- Managers: George Stallings

The 1916 Boston Braves season was the 46th season of the franchise. was a season in American baseball. The team finished third in the National League with a record of 89–63, four games behind the Brooklyn Robins.

Before the 1916 season, the Braves were sold to a syndicate headed by former Harvard University football coach Percy Haughton.

== Regular season ==
=== Season standings ===
National League
Team	W	L	Pct.	GB	Home	Road
Brooklyn Robins	94	60	.610	—	50‍–‍27	44‍–‍33
Philadelphia Phillies	91	62	.595	2½	50‍–‍29	41‍–‍33
Boston Braves	89	63	.586	4	41‍–‍31	48‍–‍32
New York Giants	86	66	.566	7	47‍–‍30	39‍–‍36
Chicago Cubs	67	86	.438	26½	37‍–‍41	30‍–‍45
Pittsburgh Pirates	65	89	.422	29	37‍–‍40	28‍–‍49
St. Louis Cardinals	60	93	.392	33½	36‍–‍40	24‍–‍53
Cincinnati Reds	60	93	.392	33½	32‍–‍44	28‍–‍49

=== Record vs. opponents ===
1916 National League record Sources:
Team	BSN	BRO	CHC	CIN	NYG	PHI	PIT	STL
Boston	—	13–9	14–7–2	13–9–1	11–10–1	11–11–1	14–8–1	13–9
Brooklyn	9–13	—	15–7–1	15–7–1	15–7	11–11	14–8	15–7
Chicago	7–14–2	7–15–1	—	9–13	10–12	8–14	12–10	14–8
Cincinnati	9–13–1	7–15–1	13–9	—	5–16	5–17	13–9	8–14
New York	10–11–1	7–15	12–10	16–5	—	9–13	17–5–2	15–7
Philadelphia	11–11–1	11–11	14–8	17–5	13–9	—	13–9	12–9
Pittsburgh	8–14–1	8–14	10–12	9–13	5–17–2	9–13	—	16–6
St. Louis	9–13	7–15	8–14	14–8	7–15	9–12	6–16	—

=== Roster ===
1916 Boston Braves
Roster
Pitchers: Frank Allen; Jesse Barnes; Tom Hughes; Elmer Knetzer; Art Nehf; Pat Ragan; Ed Reulbach; Dick Rudolph; Lefty Tyler	Catchers: Earl Blackburn; Hank Gowdy; Art Rico; Walt Tragesser; Infielders: Dick Egan; Johnny Evers; Ed Fitzpatrick; Ed Konetchy; Rabbit Maranville; Joe Mathes; Red Smith	Outfielders: Fred Bailey; Larry Chappell; Zip Collins; Pete Compton; Joe Connolly; Sherry Magee; Fred Snodgrass; Joe Wilhoit	Manager: George Stallings

== Player stats ==
=== Batting ===
==== Starters by position ====
Note: Pos = Position; G = Games played; AB = At bats; H = Hits; Avg. = Batting average; HR = Home runs; RBI = Runs batted in

Pos	Player	G	AB	H	Avg.	HR	RBI
C	Hank Gowdy	118	349	88	.252	1	34
1B	Ed Konetchy	158	566	147	.260	3	70
2B	Johnny Evers	71	241	52	.216	0	15
SS	Rabbit Maranville	155	604	142	.235	4	38
3B	Red Smith	150	509	132	.259	3	60
OF	Sherry Magee	122	419	101	.241	3	54
OF	Fred Snodgrass	112	382	95	.249	1	32
OF	Joe Wilhoit	116	383	88	.230	2	38

==== Other batters ====
Note: G = Games played; AB = At bats; H = Hits; Avg. = Batting average; HR = Home runs; RBI = Runs batted in

Player	G	AB	H	Avg.	HR	RBI
Zip Collins	93	268	56	.209	1	18
Dick Egan	83	238	53	.223	0	16
Ed Fitzpatrick	83	216	46	.213	1	18
Joe Connolly	62	110	25	.227	0	12
Earl Blackburn	47	110	30	.273	0	7
Pete Compton	34	98	20	.204	0	8
Walt Tragesser	41	54	11	.204	0	4
Larry Chappell	20	53	12	.226	0	9
Fred Bailey	6	10	1	.100	0	1
Art Rico	4	4	0	.000	0	0
Joe Mathes	2	0	0	----	0	0

=== Pitching ===
==== Starting pitchers ====
Note: G = Games pitched; IP = Innings pitched; W = Wins; L = Losses; ERA = Earned run average; SO = Strikeouts

Player	G	IP	W	L	ERA	SO
Dick Rudolph	41	312.0	19	12	2.16	133
Lefty Tyler	34	249.1	17	9	2.02	117
Pat Ragan	28	182.0	9	9	2.08	94
Frank Allen	19	113.0	8	2	2.07	63

==== Other pitchers ====
Note: G = Games pitched; IP = Innings pitched; W = Wins; L = Losses; ERA = Earned run average; SO = Strikeouts

Player	G	IP	W	L	ERA	SO
Jesse Barnes	33	163.0	6	15	2.37	55
Tom Hughes	40	161.0	16	3	2.35	97
Art Nehf	22	121.0	7	5	2.01	63
Ed Reulbach	21	109.1	7	6	2.47	47

==== Relief pitchers ====
Note: G = Games pitched; W = Wins; L = Losses; SV = Saves; ERA = Earned run average; SO = Strikeouts

Player	G	W	L	SV	ERA	SO
Elmer Knetzer	2	0	2	0	7.20	2
