= Ivey Wingo =

American baseball player and manager (1890–1941)

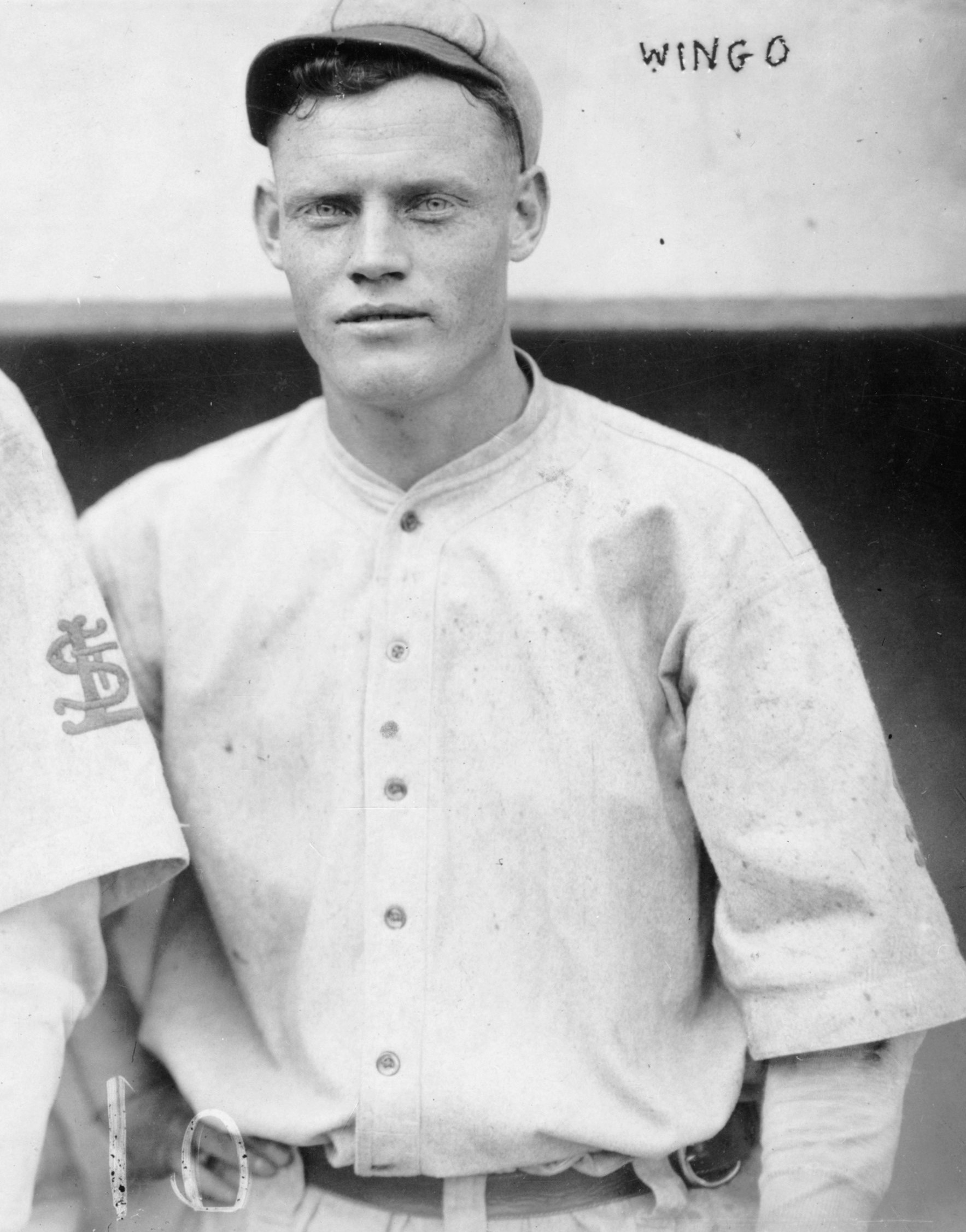
- Wingo in 1913
- Catcher / Manager
- Born: July 8, 1890; Gainesville, Georgia, U.S.
- Died: March 1, 1941 (aged 50); Norcross, Georgia, U.S.
- Batted: Left Threw: Right

MLB debut
- April 20, 1911, for the St. Louis Cardinals

Last MLB appearance
- October 6, 1929, for the Cincinnati Reds

MLB statistics
- Batting average: .260
- Home runs: 25
- Runs batted in: 455
- Stats at Baseball Reference

Teams
- As Player: St. Louis Cardinals (1911–1914); Cincinnati Reds (1915–1926, 1929); As Manager: Cincinnati Reds (1916)

Career highlights and awards
- World Series champion (1919)

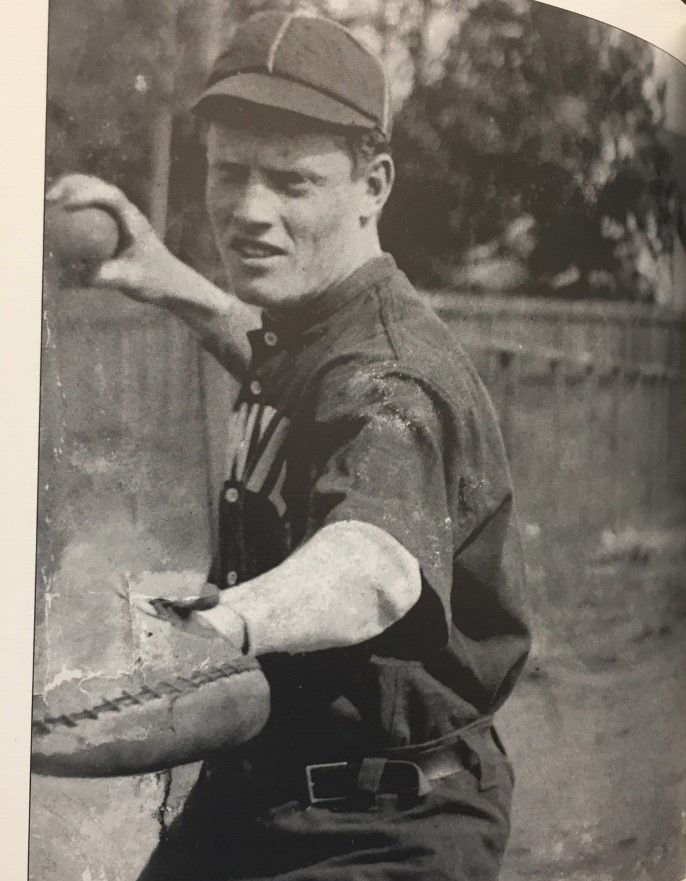

Ivey Brown Wingo (July 8, 1890 – March 1, 1941) was an American professional baseball player and manager. He played all or parts of 17 seasons in Major League Baseball for the St. Louis Cardinals and Cincinnati Reds, primarily as a catcher.

== Personal life ==
It is not known exactly where Wingo was born, with some accounts saying Gainesville, Georgia and others Norcross, Georgia. Regardless, he spent the entirety of his life as a resident of the state of Georgia.

== Baseball career ==
Wingo spent the first four years of his career (1911–14) with the Cardinals and last thirteen years with the Reds. He also managed the Reds for two games during the 1916 season. He led the National League in at bats per strikeout (30.7) in 1917.

Wingo was the backup catcher for the 1919 World Series championship Reds team, starting 3 of 8 games behind Bill Rariden. Starting games 1, 4 and 7 of the best-of-nine series, Wingo went 4 for 7 with 3 walks. He had the game-winning RBI in game 1, when his 2-out single to right field in the bottom of the 4th inning broke a 1–1 tie. With 5 victories in 8 games, the Reds won the series which was fixed by several co-conspirators, including Arnold Rothstein and Abe Attell. Wingo played for the Reds until 1926, then continued with the team as a coach before getting in one final major league appearance on the last day of the 1929 season, replacing regular catcher Johnny Gooch in the late innings of a game against the Cardinals.

At the time of his retirement, Wingo held the National League record for games caught in a career at 1,233. He still holds the post-1900 major league record for most career errors by a catcher (234).

Wingo was selected to the Georgia Sports Hall of Fame in 1993.

== See also ==
- List of Major League Baseball player-managers
