= 1916 Cincinnati Reds season =

1916 Cincinnati Reds
- League: National League
- Ballpark: Redland Field
- City: Cincinnati, Ohio
- Owners: Garry Herrmann
- Managers: Buck Herzog, Ivey Wingo, Christy Mathewson

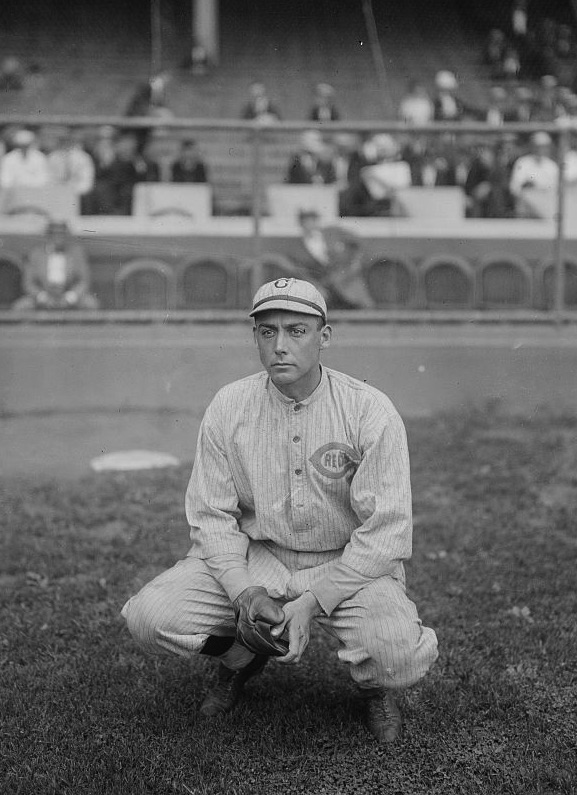

The 1916 Cincinnati Reds season was a season in American baseball. The team finished tied for seventh and last place in the National League with the St. Louis Cardinals. Both teams finished with a record of 60–93, 33½ games behind the Brooklyn Robins

== Off-season ==
In December, the Reds purchased shortstop Larry Kopf from the Philadelphia Phillies. In 1915, Kopf's first season getting regular playing time at the major league level, batted .225 with one home run and 33 RBI in 118 games. Later in the month, Cincinnati purchased the contracts of Federal League players Earl Moseley from the Newark Peppers, and second baseman Baldy Louden from the Buffalo Blues. Moseley had a 15–15 record and a league-best 1.91 ERA with the Pepper in 1915, while Louden batted .281 with four home runs and 48 RBI, and stole 30 bases with the Blues.

In early 1916, the Reds purchased first baseman Hal Chase from the Buffalo Blues of the Federal League. Chase led the league with 17 home runs in 1915, and batted .289 and also had 89 RBI in 145 games. Chase had a lot of previous experience in the American League, playing for the New York Yankees and Chicago White Sox from 1905 until 1914. Cincinnati then purchased the contract of shortstop Bob Fisher from the Chicago Cubs. Fisher batted .287 with five home runs and 53 RBI in 147 games, and led the National League with 42 sacrifice bunts.

On February 10, the club announced more purchased contracts from the Federal League, as Cincinnati acquired pitchers Jim Bluejacket from the Brooklyn Tip-Tops and Al Schulz from the Buffalo Blues, and first baseman Emil Huhn from the Newark Peppers. Bluejacket had a record of 10–11 with a 3.15 ERA in 24 games with the Tip-Tops, while Schulz was 21–14 with a 3.08 ERA in 42 games with the Blues, striking out 168 batters, throwing 25 complete games, and he led the league with 149 walks. Huhn batted .227 with a home run and 41 RBI in 127 games with the Pepper.

== Regular season ==
Early in the season, the Reds purchased the contract of pitcher Elmer Knetzer from the Boston Braves. Knetzer was acquired by Cincinnati on April 30, after he struggled in his first two games with Boston, going 0–2 with a 7.20 ERA. He would split his games with the Reds as a starting pitcher and reliever.

On July 20, with a record of 34–49 and in last place in the league, the Reds traded player-manager Buck Herzog and outfielder Red Killefer to the New York Giants for starting pitcher Christy Mathewson, third baseman Bill McKechnie and outfielder Edd Roush. Mathewson, who had struggled with the Giants in 1916, had a 3–4 record with a 2.33 ERA in 12 games. He would announce his retirement and become the Reds manager, however, Mathewson would appear in one game with Cincinnati as a starting pitcher. This would be Mathewson's first time as a manager. McKechnie had a .246 batting average with no home runs and 17 RBI at the time of the trade, while Roush was batting .188 with no home runs and five RBI in 39 games.

=== Season summary ===
After a solid 5–2 start in their first seven games, in which the Reds were in first place, the club struggled badly and by the middle of May, they were under .500 and falling out of the pennant race. On July 20, with a record of 34–49, the club was involved in a deal that centered on player manager Buck Herzog being traded to the New York Giants for Christy Mathewson. Mathewson announced his retirement from playing, and following a double header in which catcher Ivey Wingo was the interim manager, Mathewson took over.

The Reds continued to struggle under Mathewson, remaining in last place, until a three-game winning streak at the end of the season moved the team into seventh place tie with the St. Louis Cardinals. Cincinnati finished the season 60–93, which included a 25–43 record under Mathewson, and were 33.5 games behind the first place Brooklyn Robins. This marked the seventh consecutive season that the team finished under .500.

Offensively, the team was led by Hal Chase, who led the Reds with a .339 batting average, four home runs, 82 RBI and 22 stolen bases in 142 games. He led the National League in batting average, and hits with 184. Outfielder Tommy Griffith had a solid year, batting .266 with two home runs and 61 RBI in 155 games, while Edd Roush, acquired in the middle of the season, had a solid .287 average with 15 RBI and 15 stolen bases in 69 games.

On the mound, Fred Toney led the club with a 14–17 record and a team best 2.28 ERA in 41 games, pitching 300 innings, striking out 146 batters and completing 21 games. Twenty year old Pete Schneider showed much potential, despite a poor 10–19 record, he had a 2.69 ERA in 44 games. Clarence Mitchell was 11–10 with a 3.24 ERA in 29 games in his first full season with the club.

=== Season standings ===
National League
Team	W	L	Pct.	GB	Home	Road
Brooklyn Robins	94	60	.610	—	50‍–‍27	44‍–‍33
Philadelphia Phillies	91	62	.595	2½	50‍–‍29	41‍–‍33
Boston Braves	89	63	.586	4	41‍–‍31	48‍–‍32
New York Giants	86	66	.566	7	47‍–‍30	39‍–‍36
Chicago Cubs	67	86	.438	26½	37‍–‍41	30‍–‍45
Pittsburgh Pirates	65	89	.422	29	37‍–‍40	28‍–‍49
St. Louis Cardinals	60	93	.392	33½	36‍–‍40	24‍–‍53
Cincinnati Reds	60	93	.392	33½	32‍–‍44	28‍–‍49

=== Record vs. opponents ===
1916 National League record Sources:
Team	BSN	BRO	CHC	CIN	NYG	PHI	PIT	STL
Boston	—	13–9	14–7–2	13–9–1	11–10–1	11–11–1	14–8–1	13–9
Brooklyn	9–13	—	15–7–1	15–7–1	15–7	11–11	14–8	15–7
Chicago	7–14–2	7–15–1	—	9–13	10–12	8–14	12–10	14–8
Cincinnati	9–13–1	7–15–1	13–9	—	5–16	5–17	13–9	8–14
New York	10–11–1	7–15	12–10	16–5	—	9–13	17–5–2	15–7
Philadelphia	11–11–1	11–11	14–8	17–5	13–9	—	13–9	12–9
Pittsburgh	8–14–1	8–14	10–12	9–13	5–17–2	9–13	—	16–6
St. Louis	9–13	7–15	8–14	14–8	7–15	9–12	6–16	—

=== Roster ===
1916 Cincinnati Reds
Roster
Pitchers: Jim Bluejacket; Gene Dale; Elmer Knetzer; Christy Mathewson; Limb McKenry; Clarence Mitchell; Earl Moseley; Pete Schneider; Al Schulz; Fred Toney; Twink Twining	Catchers: Tommy Clarke; Emil Huhn; Ivey Wingo; Infielders: Hal Chase; Frank Emmer; Bob Fisher; Heinie Groh; Buck Herzog; Bill Hobbs; Larry Kopf; Baldy Louden; Bill McKechnie; Fritz Mollwitz; Bill Rodgers	Outfielders: Johnny Beall; Tommy Griffith; Red Killefer; Greasy Neale; Edd Roush; Paul Smith; George Twombly; Ken Williams	Manager: Buck Herzog; Christy Mathewson; Ivey Wingo; Coaches: Heinie Peitz

== Player stats ==
=== Batting ===
==== Starters by position ====
Note: Pos = Position; G = Games played; AB = At bats; H = Hits; Avg. = Batting average; HR = Home runs; RBI = Runs batted in

Pos	Player	G	AB	H	Avg.	HR	RBI
C	Ivey Wingo	119	347	85	.245	2	40
1B	Hal Chase	142	542	184	.339	4	82
2B	Baldy Louden	134	439	96	.219	1	32
SS	Buck Herzog	79	281	75	.267	1	24
3B	Heinie Groh	149	553	149	.269	2	28
OF	Edd Roush	69	272	78	.287	0	15
OF	Greasy Neale	138	530	139	.262	0	20
OF	Tommy Griffith	155	595	158	.266	2	61

==== Other batters ====
Note: G = Games played; AB = At bats; H = Hits; Avg. = Batting average; HR = Home runs; RBI = Runs batted in

Player	G	AB	H	Avg.	HR	RBI
Red Killefer	70	234	57	.244	1	18
Fritz Mollwitz	65	183	41	.224	0	16
Tommy Clarke	78	177	42	.237	0	17
Bob Fisher	61	136	37	.272	0	11
Bill McKechnie	37	130	36	.277	0	10
Emil Huhn	37	94	24	.255	0	3
Frank Emmer	42	89	13	.146	0	2
Paul Smith	10	44	10	.227	0	1`
Larry Kopf	11	40	11	.275	0	5
Ken Williams	10	27	3	.111	0	1
Johnny Beall	6	21	7	.333	1	4
Bill Hobbs	6	11	2	.182	0	1
George Twombly	6	5	0	.000	0	0
Bill Rodgers	3	4	0	.000	0	0

=== Pitching ===
==== Starting pitchers ====
Note: G = Games pitched; IP = Innings pitched; W = Wins; L = Losses; ERA = Earned run average; SO = Strikeouts

Player	G	IP	W	L	ERA	SO
Fred Toney	41	300.0	14	17	2.28	146
Pete Schneider	44	274.1	10	19	2.69	117
Clarence Mitchell	29	194.2	11	10	3.14	52
Christy Mathewson	1	9.0	1	0	8.00	3

==== Other pitchers ====
Note: G = Games pitched; IP = Innings pitched; W = Wins; L = Losses; ERA = Earned run average; SO = Strikeouts

Player	G	IP	W	L	ERA	SO
Al Schulz	44	215.0	8	19	3.14	95
Elmer Knetzer	36	171.1	5	12	2.89	70
Earl Moseley	31	150.1	7	10	3.89	60
Gene Dale	17	69.2	3	4	5.17	23
Limb McKenry	6	14.2	1	1	4.30	2
Jim Bluejacket	3	7.0	0	1	7.71	1

==== Relief pitchers ====
Note: G = Games pitched; W = Wins; L = Losses; SV = Saves; ERA = Earned run average; SO = Strikeouts

Player	G	W	L	SV	ERA	SO
Twink Twining	1	0	0	0	13.50	0
