= Wilbur Fisher =

American baseball player (1894–1960)

- Pinch hitter
- Born: July 18, 1894; Green Bottom, West Virginia
- Died: October 24, 1960 (aged 66); Welch, West Virginia
- Batted: Left Threw: Right

MLB debut
- June 13, 1916, for the Pittsburgh Pirates

Last MLB appearance
- June 13, 1916, for the Pittsburgh Pirates

MLB statistics
- Games played: 1
- At bats: 1
- Hits: 0
- Stats at Baseball Reference

Teams
- Pittsburgh Pirates (1916)

Wilbur McCullough Fisher (July 18, 1894 – October 24, 1960) was an American pinch hitter in Major League Baseball. He played for the Pittsburgh Pirates in 1916.
