= Ray O'Brien (baseball) =

American baseball player (1894–1942)

- Outfielder
- Born: October 31, 1894; St. Louis, Missouri, U.S.
- Died: March 31, 1942 (aged 47); Richmond Heights, Missouri, U.S.
- Batted: Left Threw: Left

MLB debut
- June 27, 1916, for the Pittsburgh Pirates

Last MLB appearance
- July 12, 1916, for the Pittsburgh Pirates

MLB statistics
- Batting average: .211
- Home runs: 0
- Runs batted in: 3
- Stats at Baseball Reference

Teams
- Pittsburgh Pirates (1916)

Raymond Joseph O'Brien (October 31, 1894 – March 31, 1942) was an American professional baseball player. He played a total of 16 games as an outfielder for the 1916 Pittsburgh Pirates. From 1913 to 1932, O'Brien also played for various minor league teams.
