= Gene Madden =

American baseball player (1890–1949)

- Pinch hitter
- Born: June 5, 1890; Elm Grove, West Virginia
- Died: April 6, 1949 (aged 59); Utica, New York
- Batted: Left Threw: Right

MLB debut
- April 20, 1916, for the Pittsburgh Pirates

Last MLB appearance
- April 20, 1916, for the Pittsburgh Pirates

MLB statistics
- Games played: 1
- At bats: 1
- Hits: 0
- Stats at Baseball Reference

Teams
- Pittsburgh Pirates (1916)

Eugene Madden (June 5, 1890 – April 6, 1949) was a pinch hitter in Major League Baseball. He played in one game, for the Pittsburgh Pirates on April 20, 1916. In 371 minor league games, Madden played outfield and second base.
