= Chuck Wortman =

American baseball player (1892–1977)

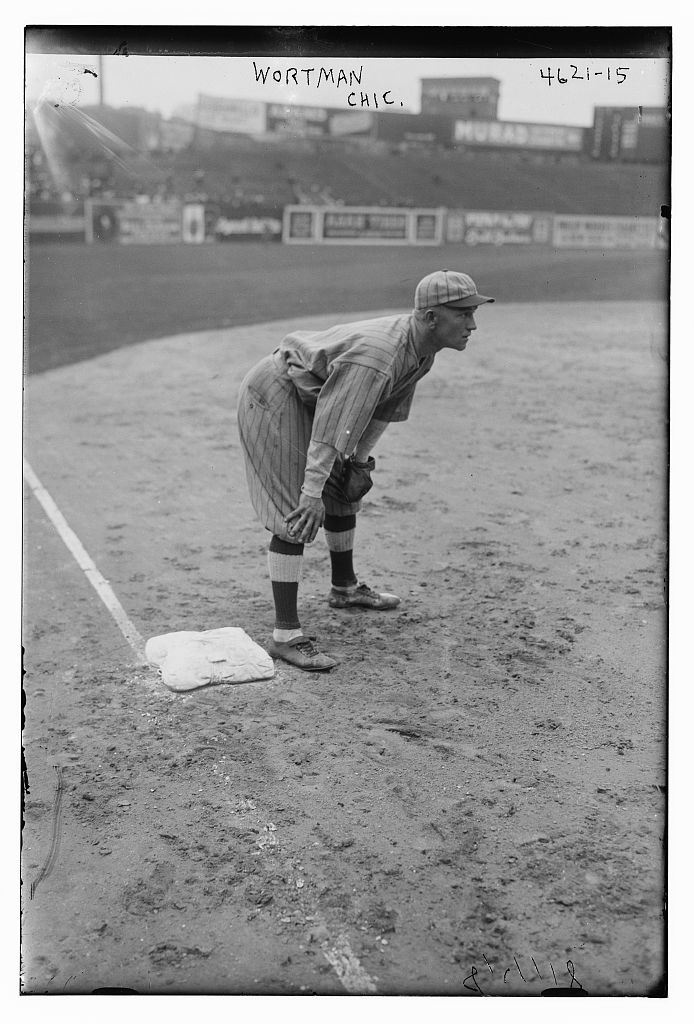
- Shortstop
- Born: January 5, 1892; Baltimore, Maryland, U.S.
- Died: August 19, 1977 (aged 85); Las Vegas, Nevada, U.S.
- Batted: Right Threw: Right

MLB debut
- July 20, 1916, for the Chicago Cubs

Last MLB appearance
- August 29, 1918, for the Chicago Cubs

MLB statistics
- Batting average: .186
- Home runs: 3
- Runs batted in: 28
- Stats at Baseball Reference

Teams
- Chicago Cubs (1916–1918)

William Lewis "Chuck" Wortman (January 5, 1892 – August 19, 1977) was an American professional baseball player. He played all or part of three seasons in Major League Baseball from 1916 to 1918 for the Chicago Cubs, primarily as a shortstop.
