= Bob Gandy =

American baseball player (1893-1945)

- Center fielder
- Born: August 25, 1893; Jacksonville, Florida, U.S.
- Died: June 19, 1945 (aged 51); Jacksonville, Florida, U.S.
- Batted: Left Threw: Right

MLB debut
- October 5, 1916, for the Philadelphia Phillies

Last MLB appearance
- October 5, 1916, for the Philadelphia Phillies

MLB statistics
- Games played: 1
- At bats: 2
- Hits: 0
- Stats at Baseball Reference

Teams
- Philadelphia Phillies (1916)

Robert Brinkley Gandy (August 25, 1893 – June 19, 1945) was an American Major League Baseball (MLB) center fielder. Gandy stood at 6'3 180 lbs (which was considered tall for his time), earning him the nickname "String", for his more than average size. Gandy played in one game for the Philadelphia Phillies on October 5, 1916. He had two at-bats and went 0-2. He shot himself to death in Jacksonville in 1945.
