= Larry Doyle (baseball) =

American baseball player (1886–1974)

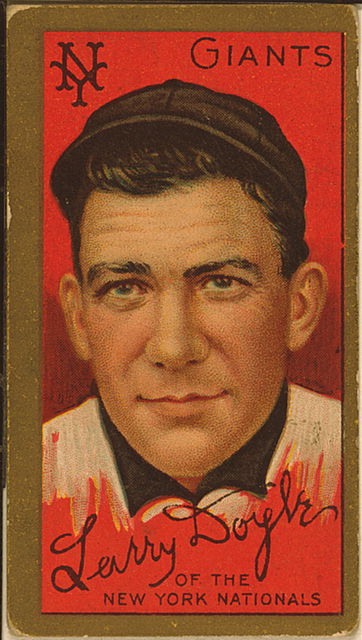
- Second baseman
- Born: July 31, 1886; Caseyville, Illinois, U.S.
- Died: March 1, 1974 (aged 87); Saranac Lake, New York, U.S.
- Batted: Left Threw: Right

MLB debut
- July 22, 1907, for the New York Giants

Last MLB appearance
- October 2, 1920, for the New York Giants

MLB statistics
- Batting average: .290
- Home runs: 74
- Runs batted in: 794
- Stats at Baseball Reference

Teams
- New York Giants (1907–1916); Chicago Cubs (1916–1917); New York Giants (1918–1920)

Career highlights and awards
- NL MVP (1912); NL batting champion (1915)

Lawrence Joseph Doyle (July 31, 1886 – March 1, 1974), nicknamed "Laughing Larry", was an American second baseman in Major League Baseball from 1907 to 1920 who played almost his entire career for the New York Giants. The National League's outstanding second baseman during the 1910s, he was awarded the 1912 Chalmers Award as the league's best player, and won the 1915 batting title with a .320 average. The team captain and top everyday star on three consecutive pennant winners (1911–1913), his .408 career slugging average was the top mark by an NL second baseman when he retired, as were his career totals in hits (1887), doubles (299), triples (123), total bases (2654) and extra base hits (496). He ended his career among the major league leaders in career games (5th, 1730), putouts (9th, 3635), assists (9th, 4654), total chances (9th, 8732) and double plays (5th, 694) at second base, and set Giants franchise records for career games, at bats and doubles, each of which was broken by Bill Terry.

== Biography ==
Doyle was a third baseman in the minor leagues before his contract was purchased by the Giants for a then-record $4,500. He debuted with the Giants on July 22, 1907, arriving late after taking the wrong boat across the Hudson River; he cost his team the game with a ninth-inning error, though he also had a pair of hits. He expected to be returned to the minor leagues; instead, he was retained by manager John McGraw, who named him the team's field captain in 1908 – a year in which he finished third in the batting race with a .308 average. Doyle, who also became the roommate of Christy Mathewson for several years, followed up with a 1909 season in which he led the NL in hits (172) and was among the league's top four players in batting (.302), slugging (.419), home runs (6) and total bases (239). 1910 saw a slight dropoff, though he was still third in the NL in home runs (8) and fourth in runs scored (97). He then entered the strongest part of his career; in 1911 he finished third in the voting for the initial Chalmers Award after hitting .310 and finishing second in the league with a .527 slugging average – the highest by an NL second baseman since Ross Barnes slugged .590 in the league's inaugural 1876 campaign. Doyle also led the league with 25 triples, the most by an NL player since 1899; it remains the highest total by a Giant since 1900. He stole 30 bases for the third consecutive year, and finished fourth in the league in home runs (13) and fifth in runs (102). In the 1911 World Series against the Philadelphia Athletics, he batted .304; with the Giants facing elimination in Game 5, he went 4 for 5, doubling and scoring an intensely disputed run in the 10th inning for a 4–3 victory. He again doubled and scored for a 1–0 lead in the first inning of Game 6, but the Giants lost the game 13–2, and with it the Series.

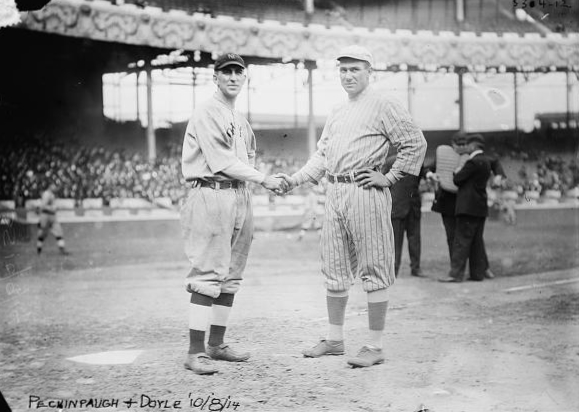
Doyle (right) with Roger Peckinpaugh (left) of the New York Yankees

Doyle enjoyed further success in 1912, winning the Chalmers Award after hitting a career-high .330 as the Giants repeated as NL champions to help them reach the World Series against the Boston Red Sox. He hit just .242 with a few wavering moments. He scored the first run of the Game 6 victory and had three hits in Game 7 with the team needing to win both to stay alive in the Series; he hit a home run in Game 7 to become the first Giant to hit a postseason home run in history. In the pivotal Game 8 (played due to Game 2 ending in a tie), he went 0-for-5 as the Giants blew a 2–1 lead in the tenth inning that saw Boston win the title. In 1913, the Giants won their third straight pennant; although he batted only .280, he stole 30 bases for the fifth year in a row and was eighth in the NL with 73 runs batted in. That year, he became the first player to hit a home run out of the Polo Grounds. He had an even more dismal World Series, hitting only .150 against the Athletics as the Giants lost in five games, though he did drive in the first run of the Series. In 1914 he slipped to a .260 average but was fourth in the league in runs. On July 17, he hit an inside-the-park home run in the top of the 21st inning to give the Giants a 3–1 lead over the Pittsburgh Pirates that they kept to win.

He enjoyed renewed success in 1915, however, winning the batting crown with a .320 average; it was the first title won by an NL second baseman since Barnes in 1876. He also led the league in hits (189) for the second time, and in doubles with 40 – a Giants franchise record until George Kelly hit 42 in 1921. Doyle was also second in the NL in runs (86) and fifth in slugging (.442). He began 1916 with a .278 average before being traded to the Chicago Cubs in late August, a painful move for the fiercely loyal player who had famously said in 1911 that it was "great to be young and a Giant." After hitting .395 for the Cubs in nine games that year, he batted .254 for the team in 1917, finishing fourth in the league with 6 home runs, before a pair of January 1918 trades brought him back to New York. He hit .261 in his return to the Giants before having his last outstanding season in 1919; that year he again was league runner-up in slugging with a .433 average, and was fifth in home runs (7). He batted .285 in his final season in 1920, and was granted his release so he could manage the Toronto Maple Leafs of the International League. At the time, he was within five games of Johnny Evers' league record for career games at second base.

Doyle ended his career with a .290 batting average, putting him behind only Nap Lajoie (.338), Eddie Collins (then at .329) and Cupid Childs (.306) among players with 1000 games at second base. His 74 home runs placed him third at his position behind Fred Pfeffer (94) and Lajoie (83). He also had 960 runs and 794 RBI in 1766 games, as well as 298 stolen bases including 17 steals of home plate; he held the Giants club record for career steals from 1918 to 1919, when teammate George Burns passed him. Baseball Magazine selected Doyle as the second baseman on their NL All-America Team in 1911 and 1915.

Doyle contracted tuberculosis in 1942, and entered the Trudeau Sanitorium in Saranac Lake, New York. When the institution closed in 1954 due to the development of an effective antibiotic treatment, he was the last resident to leave; Life Magazine photographers covered his last meal and his departure, on foot, from the grounds. He stayed on in Saranac Lake, and died there 20 years later, at age 87.

== See also ==
- List of Major League Baseball career triples leaders
- List of Major League Baseball career stolen bases leaders
- List of Major League Baseball batting champions
- List of Major League Baseball annual doubles leaders
- List of Major League Baseball annual triples leaders
