= Frank Smykal =

American baseball player (1889–1950)

- Shortstop
- Born: October 13, 1889; Chicago, Illinois, U.S.
- Died: August 11, 1950 (aged 60); Chicago, Illinois, U.S.
- Batted: Right Threw: Right

MLB debut
- August 30, 1916, for the Pittsburgh Pirates

Last MLB appearance
- September 10, 1916, for the Pittsburgh Pirates

MLB statistics
- Games played: 6
- At bats: 10
- Hits: 3
- Stats at Baseball Reference

Teams
- Pittsburgh Pirates (1916)

Frank John Smykal (October 13, 1889 – August 11, 1950) was an American shortstop in Major League Baseball. He played for the Pittsburgh Pirates.
