= Duke Kelleher =

American baseball player (1893-1947)

- Catcher
- Born: September 30, 1893; New York City
- Died: September 28, 1947 (aged 53); Staten Island, New York
- Batted: Unknown Threw: Right

MLB debut
- August 18, 1916, for the New York Giants

Last MLB appearance
- August 18, 1916, for the New York Giants

MLB statistics
- Games played: 1
- Plate appearances: 0
- Hits: 0
- Stats at Baseball Reference

Teams
- New York Giants (1916)

Albert Aloysius Kelleher (September 30, 1893 – September 28, 1947) was a catcher in Major League Baseball. He played one game for the New York Giants, appearing as a catcher for the final inning of an 8-1 Giants victory over the Chicago Cubs on August 18, 1916. He did not make a plate appearance, and did not record a fielding chance.
