= Murphy Currie =

American baseball player (1893–1939)

- Pitcher
- Born: August 31, 1893; Fayetteville, North Carolina
- Died: June 18, 1939 (aged 45); Asheboro, North Carolina
- Batted: Right Threw: Right

MLB debut
- August 31, 1916, for the St. Louis Cardinals

Last MLB appearance
- September 21, 1916, for the St. Louis Cardinals

MLB statistics
- Win–loss record: 0–0
- Earned run average: 1.88
- Strikeouts: 8
- Stats at Baseball Reference

Teams
- St. Louis Cardinals (1916)

Archibald Murphy Currie (August 31, 1893 – June 18, 1939) was a pitcher in Major League Baseball. He played for the St. Louis Cardinals in 1916.
