= Hooks Warner =

American baseball player (1894–1947)

- Third baseman
- Born: May 22, 1894; Del Rio, Texas, U.S.
- Died: February 19, 1947 (aged 52); San Francisco, California, U.S.
- Batted: Left Threw: Right

MLB debut
- August 21, 1916, for the Pittsburgh Pirates

Last MLB appearance
- June 17, 1921, for the Chicago Cubs

MLB statistics
- Batting average: .228
- Home runs: 2
- Runs batted in: 19
- Stats at Baseball Reference

Teams
- Pittsburgh Pirates (1916–1917, 1919); Chicago Cubs (1921)

Hoke Hayden Warner (May 22, 1894 – February 19, 1947) was an American baseball player for the Chicago Cubs and the Pittsburgh Pirates. He was 170 pounds and batted left and threw right. He started his career on August 21, 1916. His final game was on June 17, 1921. He was born on May 22, 1894, in Del Rio, Texas. He died on February 19, 1947, in San Francisco, California.
