= Heinie Zimmerman =

American baseball player (1887–1969)

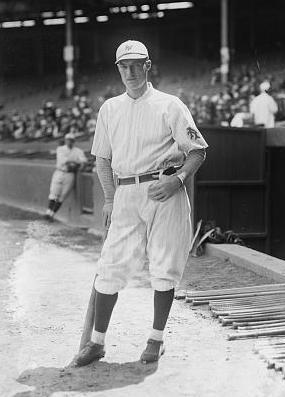
- Zimmerman in 1919
- Third baseman / Second baseman
- Born: February 9, 1887; New York City, New York, U.S.
- Died: March 14, 1969 (aged 82); New York City, New York, U.S.
- Batted: Right Threw: Right

MLB debut
- September 8, 1907, for the Chicago Cubs

Last MLB appearance
- September 10, 1919, for the New York Giants

MLB statistics
- Batting average: .295
- Home runs: 58
- Runs batted in: 799
- Stats at Baseball Reference

Teams
- Chicago Cubs (1907–1916); New York Giants (1916–1919)

Career highlights and awards
- 2× World Series champion (1907, 1908); NL Triple Crown (1912); NL batting champion (1912); NL home run leader (1912); 3× NL RBI leader (1912, 1916, 1917); Chicago Cubs Hall of Fame

Henry Zimmerman (February 9, 1887 – March 14, 1969), known as "Heinie" or "the Great Zim", was an American professional baseball third baseman. Zimmerman played in Major League Baseball for the Chicago Cubs and New York Giants from 1907 to 1919. A good hitter, he won the National League triple crown in 1912. He was also known for his poor performance in the 1917 World Series, and his baseball career ended when he was banned for fixing games.

== Career ==
Zimmerman was born in New York City in 1887. He started his professional baseball career with the New York State League's Wilkes-Barre Barons in 1906. The following season, he was purchased by the Chicago Cubs. He was a part of the Cubs teams that won the World Series in 1907 and 1908, although he received limited playing time. Within the next few years, he became a regular player.

In 1912, Zimmerman won the NL triple crown, leading the league with a .372 batting average, 14 home runs, and 104 runs batted in. (Note: Honus Wagner was thought to have led the league in RBI, though later research suggested that Zimmerman did.) He also led the league with 207 hits and a 170 OPS+. He never played as well again but remained a productive player.

In 1916, Zimmerman was traded to the New York Giants. He led the NL in RBI that season, with 83. He led the NL in RBI again in 1917, with 100. The Giants then lost the 1917 World Series, and Zimmerman played poorly, batting .120.

Zimmerman became known for an infamous play in the decisive sixth game of the series. In the fourth inning, the game was scoreless when Eddie Collins of the Chicago White Sox was caught between third base and home plate. Catcher Bill Rariden ran up the line to start a rundown, expecting pitcher Rube Benton or first baseman Walter Holke to cover the plate. However, neither of them moved, and Collins blew past Rariden to score the series-winning run. With no one covering the plate, third baseman Zimmerman was forced to chase Collins, pawing helplessly in the air with the ball in a futile attempt to tag him. Zimmerman was long blamed for losing the game, although Giants manager John McGraw blamed Benton and Holke for making the fundamental mistake of failing to cover the plate. The play was actually quite close, as action photos show Zimmerman leaping over the sliding Collins. A quote often attributed to Zimmerman, but actually invented by writer Ring Lardner years later, was that when asked about the incident Zim replied, "Who the hell was I supposed to throw to? Klem (umpire Bill Klem, who was working the plate)?"

After a lot of public criticism for his World Series performance, Zimmerman had a mediocre season in 1918. In 1919, the Giants acquired Hal Chase, and he and Zimmerman tried to get other players to help them throw games during the season. Zimmerman's actions got him kicked off the team in September 1919, and he never played in organized baseball again.

Based on testimony by McGraw during the Black Sox Scandal hearings in the early 1920s, Zimmerman and Chase were both indicted for bribery. Zimmerman denied McGraw's accusations, and neither he nor Chase was ever proven to be directly connected to the Black Sox. According to some historians, Zimmerman had been informally banned after the Giants released him.

Baseball commissioner Kenesaw Mountain Landis later declared that any players who had been involved in throwing games would be banned from baseball, which could have included Zimmerman; however Judge Landis never formally ruled on Zimmerman. But based on Zimmerman's long-term pattern of gambling and his role in the Black Sox Scandal, Landis' declaration after the Black Sox trial is seen as formalizing Zimmerman's ban. Regardless, his career was effectively over by the time Landis was appointed.

In 1,456 MLB games played, Zimmerman batted .295 (1566-5304) with 695 runs scored, 275 doubles, 105 triples, 58 home runs, 799 RBI, 175 stolen bases, a .331 on-base percentage, and a .419 slugging percentage in 13 seasons. In 12 World Series games, he hit .163 (7-43) with 2 RBI. In the 2001 book The New Bill James Historical Baseball Abstract, Bill James ranked Zimmerman as the 51st greatest third baseman of all-time.

Zimmerman died in New York City in 1969. He is buried in Woodlawn Cemetery.

== See also ==
- Major League Baseball Triple Crown
- List of Major League Baseball batting champions
- List of Major League Baseball annual home run leaders
- List of Major League Baseball annual runs batted in leaders
- List of Major League Baseball annual doubles leaders
- List of Major League Baseball career triples leaders
