= Paul Carpenter (baseball) =

American baseball player (1894–1968)

- Pitcher
- Born: August 12, 1894; Granville, Ohio
- Died: March 14, 1968 (aged 73); Newark, Ohio
- Batted: Right Threw: Right

MLB debut
- July 26, 1916, for the Pittsburgh Pirates

Last MLB appearance
- September 2, 1916, for the Pittsburgh Pirates

MLB statistics
- Win–loss record: 0-0
- Earned run average: 1.17
- Strikeouts: 5
- Stats at Baseball Reference

Teams
- Pittsburgh Pirates (1916)

Paul Calvin Carpenter (August 12, 1894 – March 14, 1968) was a minor league baseball player. He played for the Pittsburgh Pirates in 1916 and was the designated replacement for Jigger Statz, playing for the Los Angeles Angels in the Pacific Coast League, in the 1940 season. He was the uncle of Woody English, who also played professional baseball.
