= Mack Wheat =

American baseball player (1893-1979)

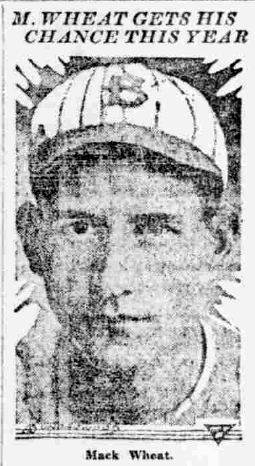
- Catcher
- Born: June 9, 1893; Polo, Missouri, U.S.
- Died: August 14, 1979 (aged 86); Los Banos, California, U.S.
- Batted: Right Threw: Right

MLB debut
- April 14, 1915, for the Brooklyn Robins

Last MLB appearance
- June 6th, 1921, for the Philadelphia Phillies

MLB statistics
- Batting average: .204
- Home runs: 4
- Runs batted in: 35
- Stats at Baseball Reference

Teams
- Brooklyn Robins (1915–1919); Philadelphia Phillies (1920–1921)

McKinley Davis Wheat (June 9, 1893 – August 14, 1979) was an American Major League Baseball catcher from 1915 to 1921.

From 1915 to 1919, he was a teammate of his brother, Zack Wheat, on the Brooklyn Robins. The Philadelphia Phillies bought Mack in 1920. He finished out his professional career in 1922 in the Pacific Coast League.
