= Erv Kantlehner =

American baseball player (1892–1990)

- Pitcher
- Born: July 31, 1892; San Jose, California, U.S.
- Died: February 3, 1990 (aged 97); Santa Barbara, California, U.S.
- Batted: Left Threw: Left

MLB debut
- April 17, 1914, for the Pittsburgh Pirates

Last MLB appearance
- October 4, 1916, for the Philadelphia Phillies

MLB statistics
- Win–loss record: 13–29
- Earned run average: 2.84
- Strikeouts: 141
- Stats at Baseball Reference

Teams
- Pittsburgh Pirates (1914–1916); Philadelphia Phillies (1916)

Erving Leslie Kantlehner (July 31, 1892 – February 3, 1990), nicknamed "Peanuts", was an American professional baseball player who played pitcher in the Major Leagues from 1914 to 1916. Kantlehner played for the Pittsburgh Pirates and Philadelphia Phillies. Kantlehner attended Santa Clara University.
