= Slim Sallee =

American baseball player (1885–1950)

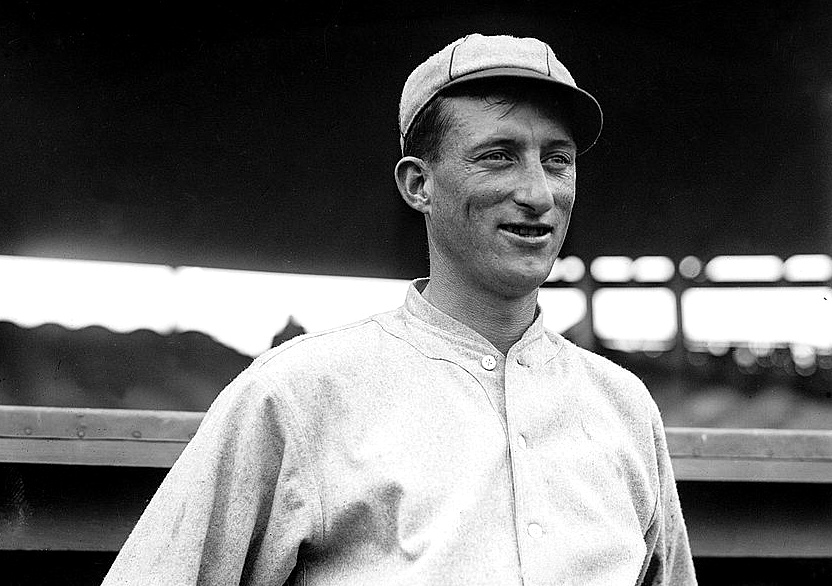
- Sallee with the St. Louis Cardinals in 1911
- Pitcher
- Born: February 3, 1885; Higginsport, Ohio, U.S.
- Died: March 22, 1950 (aged 65); Higginsport, Ohio, U.S.
- Batted: Right Threw: Left

MLB debut
- April 16, 1908, for the St. Louis Cardinals

Last MLB appearance
- September 20, 1921, for the New York Giants

MLB statistics
- Win–loss record: 174–143
- Earned run average: 2.56
- Strikeouts: 836
- Stats at Baseball Reference

Teams
- St. Louis Cardinals (1908–1916); New York Giants (1916–1918); Cincinnati Reds (1919–1920); New York Giants (1920–1921)

Career highlights and awards
- 2x World Series champion (1919, 1921)

Harry Franklin "Slim" Sallee (February 3, 1885 – March 22, 1950) was an American professional baseball player. He was a left-handed pitcher over parts of fourteen seasons (1908–1921) with the St. Louis Cardinals, New York Giants and Cincinnati Reds. For his career, he compiled a 174–143 record in 476 appearances, with a 2.56 earned run average and 836 strikeouts.

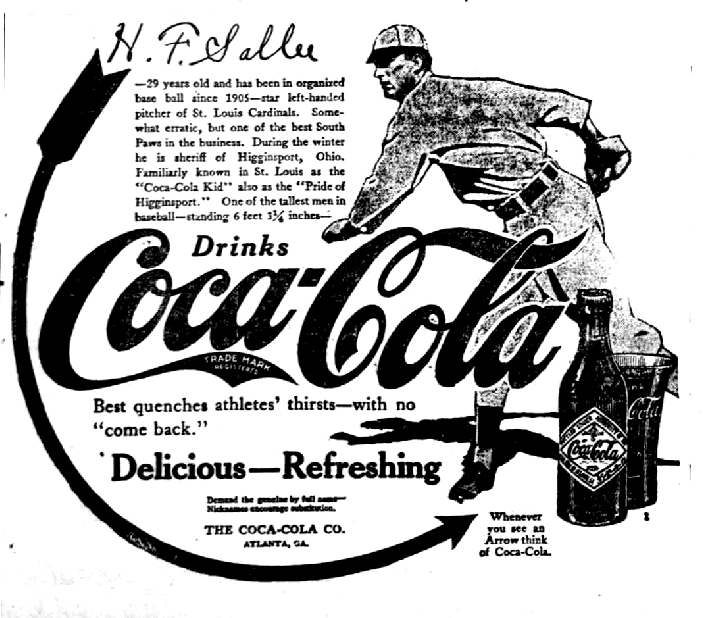
Sallee in a Coca-Cola ad from 1914.

Sallee made his Major League debut with the Cardinals in 1908, where he developed an eccentric reputation, drinking during games and occasionally disappearing for days on end, resulting in numerous fines. After feigning retirement in 1916, Sallee was traded to the New York Giants, starting with them in the 1917 season. With the Giants, Sallee pitched in two World Series, both against the Chicago White Sox. He lost a World Series to the White Sox as a member of the 1917 Giants, starting Game 1 and losing 2-1 to Sox ace Eddie Cicotte in Chicago, driving in his team's only run. In 1918, after dealing with injuries to his back, Sallee was purchased by the Cincinnati Reds via waiver and was a member of the victorious Reds in the infamous "Black Sox" 1919 World Series. He produced the best season of his career for the 1919 Reds, going 21–7 with a 2.06 earned run average. Sallee was released by the Reds in 1920 and resigned with the Giants, where he played as a relief pitcher, leading the National League in relief wins in 1921. Despite being on the roster for the 1921 Giants, he did not pitch for them during the 1921 World Series against the New York Yankees.

Also in 1919, Sallee became just the second pitcher (at that time) to have more wins than walks in a season. Christy Mathewson did it twice (1913, 1914) and Bret Saberhagen accomplished this feat in 1994 with the New York Mets.

On March 22, 1950, Salle died of a heart attack. He was buried at Confidence Cemetery in Georgetown, Ohio.

== See also ==
- List of St. Louis Cardinals team records
- List of Major League Baseball annual saves leaders
