= George Burns (outfielder) =

American baseball player (1889–1966)

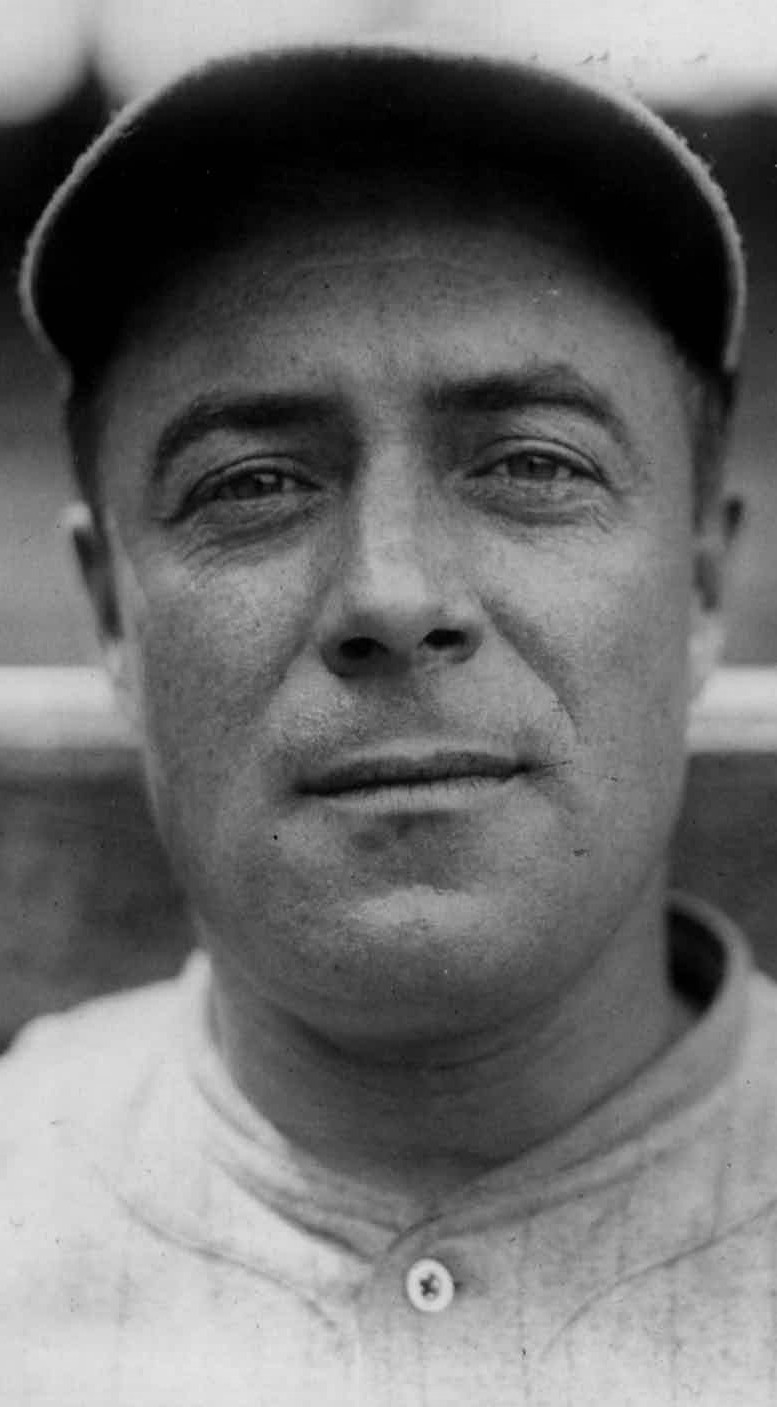
- Outfielder
- Born: November 24, 1889; Utica, New York, U.S.
- Died: August 15, 1966 (aged 76); Gloversville, New York, U.S.
- Batted: Right Threw: Right

MLB debut
- October 3, 1911, for the New York Giants

Last MLB appearance
- September 4, 1925, for the Philadelphia Phillies

MLB statistics
- Batting average: .287
- Hits: 2,077
- Home runs: 41
- Runs batted in: 611
- Stolen bases: 383
- Stats at Baseball Reference

Teams
- New York Giants (1911–1921); Cincinnati Reds (1922–1924); Philadelphia Phillies (1925)

Career highlights and awards
- World Series champion (1921); 2× NL stolen base leader (1914, 1919)

George Joseph Burns (November 24, 1889 – August 15, 1966) was an American left fielder in Major League Baseball who spent most of his career as the leadoff hitter for the New York Giants. Nicknamed "Silent George" by his teammates due to his soft-spoken personality, he was an effective leadoff man who was revered for his plate discipline. Burns is one of only four players in major league history to lead the league in runs and walks five times each; the others are Babe Ruth, Ted Williams, and Mickey Mantle. A two-time stolen base champion, he holds the Giants franchise record for stolen bases in a single season (62, in 1914), and held the club's career record from 1919 to 1972. At the end of his career, his 1262 games in left field ranked eighth in major league history, and his total of 1844 games in the outfield ranked sixth in NL history.

== Career ==
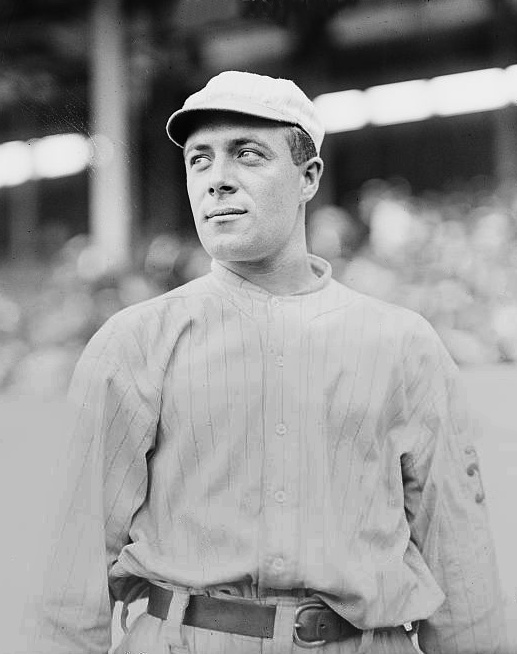
Burns in 1913

Born in Utica, New York, Burns started his baseball career as a catcher, and reached the Giants in the latter half of the 1911 season. Because of his strong throwing arm and outstanding speed, manager John McGraw converted him into an outfielder. He joined the regular lineup in 1913 and, becoming one of the first players to wear sunglasses and using a long-billed cap, came to excel defensively in left field at the Polo Grounds with its difficult angles; the left field bleachers came to be known as "Burnsville", and his teammates would later describe him as the "greatest 'sunfielder' in the history of the game." In his rookie season he hit 37 doubles, bettering Jim O'Rourke's 1889 club record of 36; the mark would stand for only two years, however, before Larry Doyle hit 40 in 1915. 1913 also marked Burns's first World Series appearance, though he only batted .158 as the Giants lost.

In 1914 he led the NL in runs for the first time and batted a career-high .303, and also edged Josh Devore's 1911 club record of 61 steals by one; he finished fourth in the voting for the Chalmers (MVP) Award, in the last year such an award would be given in the NL until 1924. In 1917 he batted .302, led the NL in runs a third time and in walks for the first time, and finished second in the NL in total bases behind Hornsby; he also appeared in his second World Series, but had another poor performance, hitting .227 as the Giants again lost. In 1919 he led the league in runs, walks and steals again, and also led NL outfielders in fielding percentage for the first time. He surpassed his teammate Doyle's franchise record for career stolen bases; his eventual record of 334 was broken by Willie Mays in 1972. Burns hit for the cycle on September 17, 1920, and led the NL in runs for the fifth time that year.

In the 1921 World Series, Burns finally had a successful postseason; he had four hits in Game 3 as the Giants rolled to a 13–5 win, and had a 2-run double in the 8th inning of Game 4, breaking a 1–1 tie as New York evened the Series at two games each. He scored the deciding run in Game 6, and batted .333 for the Series as the Giants won their first title since 1905. Two months later he was sent to the Cincinnati Reds in a trade that brought third baseman Heinie Groh to the Giants. In 1922 Burns set an NL record with his 28th steal of home, surpassing the old mark held by Honus Wagner; Max Carey broke his record later in the decade. He also set a Reds club record with 631 at bats (Hughie Critz broke the mark in 1928). In the Reds' first game at New York that season, he was given a day in his honor and presented with a diamond-studded watch.

Burns ended his major league career with the Philadelphia Phillies in 1925. In a 15-season career, he was a .287 hitter with 1,188 runs, 41 home runs and 611 runs batted in in 1853 games played. He collected 2,077 hits with a .366 on-base percentage, and his 383 stolen bases ranked 12th all-time at that point. Although he never had more than 181 hits in a season, playing in an era of diminished hitting, he was among the league's top five players six times. Defensively, he recorded a .970 fielding percentage at all three outfield positions. His NL record of leading the league in outfield games six times was later matched by Billy Williams and Dale Murphy; his Giants record of 1184 games in left field was broken by Jo-Jo Moore in 1941.

== Legacy ==
In 1918, a sportswriter asked John McGraw who the best player he ever managed was aside from Christy Mathewson. McGraw said, "George Burns! He is a marvel in every department of play, a superb fielder, a wonderful thrower, a grand batsman and with few peers in baseball history as a run scorer. Best of all, Burns, modest and retiring to an extreme, is the easiest player to handle that ever stepped upon a field."

In a 1920 Sporting News article, sportswriter John B. Sheridan ranked Burns as the fourth greatest outfielder in history, behind only Ty Cobb, Tris Speaker and Jimmy Sheckard. "I am one of those who think that Burns has been underrated in New York and elsewhere," Sheridan said. "He is one of the great outfielders of all time. I have never seen him play a bad game of baseball."

== After baseball ==
In 1927 he became a player-coach with Williamsport in the New York–Penn League, and he returned to the Giants in 1937 as a coach. He later worked for a tannery, and retired in 1957.

Burns died in Gloversville, New York at age 76.

== Related links ==
- List of Major League Baseball career hits leaders
- List of Major League Baseball career triples leaders
- List of Major League Baseball career stolen bases leaders
- List of Major League Baseball players to hit for the cycle
- List of Major League Baseball annual runs scored leaders
- List of Major League Baseball annual stolen base leaders
- Major League Baseball titles leaders

Achievements
Preceded by George Sisler	Hitting for the cycle September 17, 1920	Succeeded by Bobby Veach
