= 1916 Major League Baseball season =

1916 MLB season
- League: American League (AL); National League (NL)
- Sport: Baseball
- Duration: Regular season: April 14 – October 4, 1916 (AL); April 14 – October 5, 1916 (NL); World Series: October 7–12, 1916
- Games: 154
- Teams: 16 (8 per league)

Pennant winners
- AL champions: Boston Red Sox
- AL runners-up: Chicago White Sox
- NL champions: Brooklyn Robins
- NL runners-up: Philadelphia Phillies

World Series
- Champions: Boston Red Sox
- Runners-up: Brooklyn Robins

MLB seasons
- ← 1915 1917 →

Locations of teams for the 1915–1922 American League seasons
American League
Locations of teams for the 1916–1919 National League seasons
National League

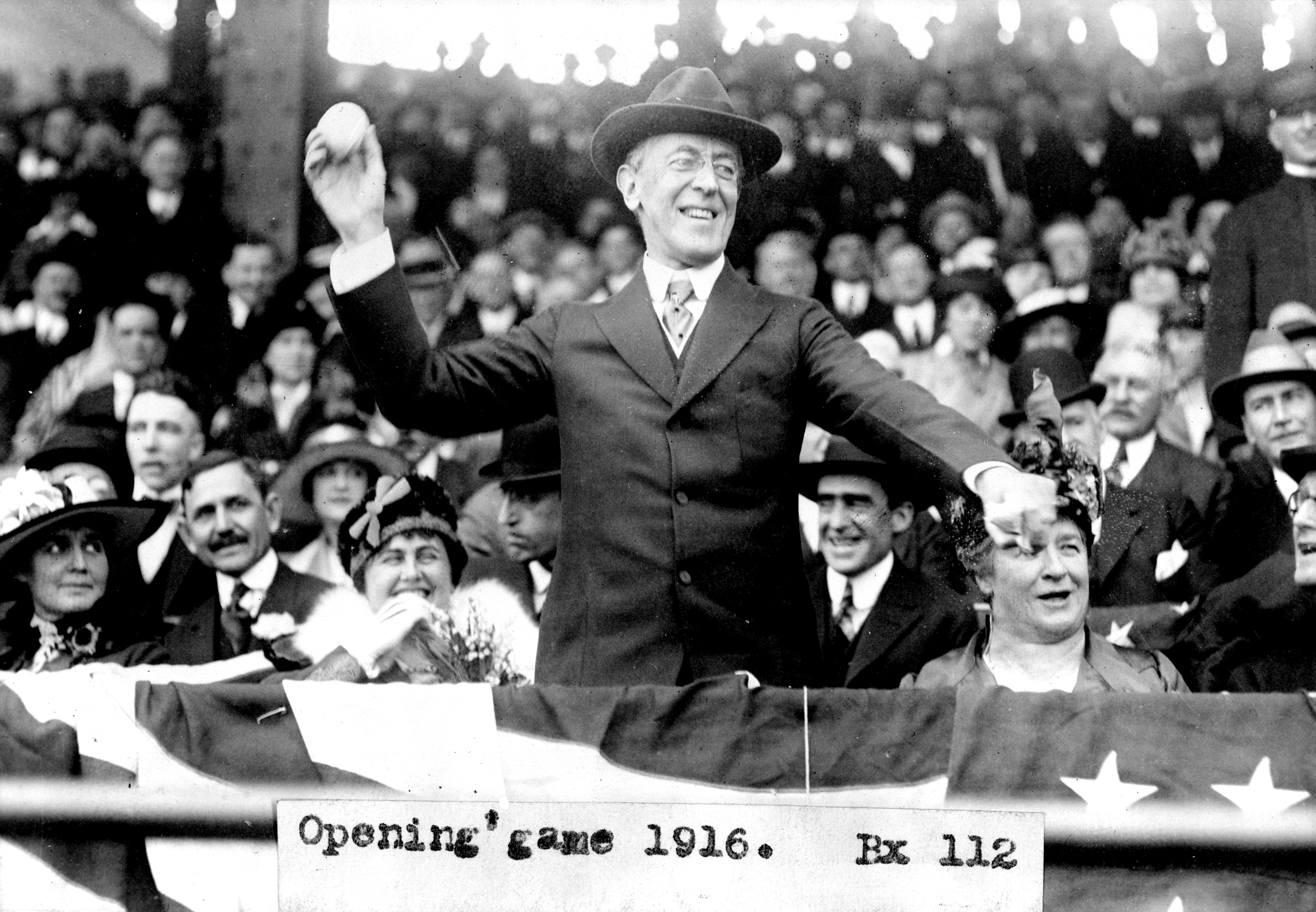
U.S. President Woodrow Wilson throws out the ball on opening day of baseball season, 1916.

The 1916 major league baseball season began on April 12, 1916. The regular season ended on October 5, with the Brooklyn Robins and Boston Red Sox as the regular season champions of the National League and American League, respectively. The postseason began with Game 1 of the 13th World Series on October 7 and ended with Game 5 on October 12. The Red Sox defeated the Robins, four games to one, capturing their fourth championship in franchise history, and the third team to win back-to-back World Series.

Interference by the National and American Leagues in their operations caused the two-season Federal League to fold prior to the 1916 season.

== Schedule ==
The 1916 schedule consisted of 154 games for all teams in the American League and National League, each of which had eight teams. Each team was scheduled to play 22 games against the other seven teams of their respective league. This continued the format put in place for the 1904 season. This format would last until 1919.

Opening Day, April 14, featured all sixteen teams, continuing the trend which started with the 1912 season. The American League would see its final day of the regular season on October 4, while the National League would see its final day of the regular season was on October 5. The World Series took place between October 7 and October 12.

== Rule change ==
The National League ruled that a player's bat was considered part of him until a ball in play is fielded.

== Teams ==
League	Team	City	Ballpark	Capacity	Manager
American League	Boston Red Sox	Boston, Massachusetts	Fenway Park	27,000	Bill Carrigan
American League	Chicago White Sox	Chicago, Illinois	Comiskey Park	28,000	Pants Rowland
American League	Cleveland Indians	Cleveland, Ohio	Dunn Field	21,414	Lee Fohl
American League	Detroit Tigers	Detroit, Michigan	Navin Field	23,000	Hughie Jennings
American League	New York Yankees	New York, New York	Brush Stadium	34,000	Bill Donovan
American League	Philadelphia Athletics	Philadelphia, Pennsylvania	Shibe Park	23,000	Connie Mack
American League	St. Louis Browns	St. Louis, Missouri	Sportsman's Park	18,000	Fielder Jones
American League	Washington Senators	Washington, D.C.	National Park	27,000	Clark Griffith
National League	Boston Braves	Boston, Massachusetts	Braves Field	40,000	George Stallings
National League	Brooklyn Robins	New York, New York	Ebbets Field	30,000	Wilbert Robinson
National League	Chicago Cubs	Chicago, Illinois	Weeghman Park	15,000	Joe Tinker
National League	Cincinnati Reds	Cincinnati, Ohio	Redland Field	20,696	Buck Herzog
National League	Cincinnati Reds	Cincinnati, Ohio	Redland Field	20,696	Ivey Wingo
National League	Cincinnati Reds	Cincinnati, Ohio	Redland Field	20,696	Christy Mathewson
National League	New York Giants	New York, New York	Brush Stadium	34,000	John McGraw
National League	Philadelphia Phillies	Philadelphia, Pennsylvania	National League Park	18,000	Pat Moran
National League	Pittsburgh Pirates	Pittsburgh, Pennsylvania	Forbes Field	25,000	Jimmy Callahan
National League	St. Louis Cardinals	St. Louis, Missouri	Robison Field	21,000	Miller Huggins

== Standings ==
=== American League ===
American League
Team	W	L	Pct.	GB	Home	Road
Boston Red Sox	91	63	.591	—	49‍–‍28	42‍–‍35
Chicago White Sox	89	65	.578	2	49‍–‍28	40‍–‍37
Detroit Tigers	87	67	.565	4	49‍–‍28	38‍–‍39
New York Yankees	80	74	.519	11	46‍–‍31	34‍–‍43
St. Louis Browns	79	75	.513	12	45‍–‍32	34‍–‍43
Cleveland Indians	77	77	.500	14	44‍–‍33	33‍–‍44
Washington Senators	76	77	.497	14½	49‍–‍28	27‍–‍49
Philadelphia Athletics	36	117	.235	54½	23‍–‍53	13‍–‍64

=== National League ===
National League
Team	W	L	Pct.	GB	Home	Road
Brooklyn Robins	94	60	.610	—	50‍–‍27	44‍–‍33
Philadelphia Phillies	91	62	.595	2½	50‍–‍29	41‍–‍33
Boston Braves	89	63	.586	4	41‍–‍31	48‍–‍32
New York Giants	86	66	.566	7	47‍–‍30	39‍–‍36
Chicago Cubs	67	86	.438	26½	37‍–‍41	30‍–‍45
Pittsburgh Pirates	65	89	.422	29	37‍–‍40	28‍–‍49
St. Louis Cardinals	60	93	.392	33½	36‍–‍40	24‍–‍53
Cincinnati Reds	60	93	.392	33½	32‍–‍44	28‍–‍49

=== Tie games ===
20 tie games (10 in AL, 10 in NL), which are not factored into winning percentage or games behind (and were often replayed again) occurred throughout the season.

==== American League ====
- Boston Red Sox, 2
- Chicago White Sox, 1
- Cleveland Indians, 3
- Detroit Tigers, 1
- New York Yankees, 2
- Philadelphia Athletics, 1
- St. Louis Browns, 4
- Washington Senators, 6

==== National League ====
- Boston Braves, 6
- Brooklyn Robins, 2
- Chicago Cubs, 3
- Cincinnati Reds, 2
- New York Giants, 3
- Philadelphia Phillies, 1
- Pittsburgh Pirates, 3

== Postseason ==
The postseason began on October 7 and ended on October 12 with the Boston Red Sox defeating the Brooklyn Robins in the 1916 World Series in five games.

=== Bracket ===
World Series
AL	Boston Red Sox	4
NL	Brooklyn Robins	1

== Managerial changes ==
=== Off-season ===
Team	Former Manager	New Manager
Baltimore Terrapins	Otto Knabe	Team folded
Brooklyn Tip-Tops	John Ganzel	Team folded
Buffalo Blues	Harry Lord	Team folded
Chicago Cubs	Roger Bresnahan	Joe Tinker
Chicago Whales	Joe Tinker	Team folded
Kansas City Packers	George Stovall	Team folded
Newark Peppers	Bill McKechnie	Team folded
Pittsburgh Pirates	Fred Clarke	Jimmy Callahan
Pittsburgh Rebels	Rebel Oakes	Team folded
St. Louis Browns	Branch Rickey	Fielder Jones
St. Louis Terriers	Fielder Jones	Team folded

=== In-season ===
Team	Former Manager	New Manager
Cincinnati Reds	Buck Herzog	Ivey Wingo
Cincinnati Reds	Ivey Wingo	Christy Mathewson

== League leaders ==
Any team shown in small text indicates a previous team a player was on during the season.

=== American League ===
Hitting leaders
Stat	Player	Total
AVG	Tris Speaker (CLE)	.386
OPS	Tris Speaker (CLE)	.972
HR	Wally Pipp (NYY)	12
RBI	Del Pratt (SLB)	103
R	Ty Cobb (DET)	113
H	Tris Speaker (CLE)	211
SB	Ty Cobb (DET)	68

Pitching leaders
Stat	Player	Total
W	Walter Johnson (WSH)	25
L	Bullet Joe Bush (PHA)	24
ERA	Babe Ruth (BOS)	1.75
K	Walter Johnson (WSH)	228
IP	Walter Johnson (WSH)	369.2
SV	Bob Shawkey (NYY)	8
WHIP	Reb Russell (CWS)	0.942

=== National League ===
Hitting leaders
Stat	Player	Total
AVG	Hal Chase (CIN)	.339
OPS	Cy Williams (CHC)	.831
HR	Dave Robertson (NYG); Cy Williams (CHC)	12
RBI	Heinie Zimmerman (NYG/CHC)	128
R	George Burns (NYG)	105
H	Hal Chase (CIN)	184
SB	Max Carey (PIT)	63

^{1} National League Triple Crown pitching winner

Pitching leaders
Stat	Player	Total
W	Grover Alexander^{1} (PHI)	33
L	Lee Meadows (STL)	23
ERA	Grover Alexander^{1} (PHI)	1.55
K	Grover Alexander^{1} (PHI)	167
IP	Grover Alexander (PHI)	389.0
SV	Red Ames (STL)	8
WHIP	Grover Alexander (PHI)	0.959

== Milestones ==
=== Batters ===
- Ty Cobb (DET):
  - Recorded his 600th career stolen base in the first inning against the Philadelphia Athletics on June 18. He became the sixth player to reach this mark.

=== Pitchers ===
==== No-hitters ====
- Tom Hughes (BSN):
  - Hughes threw his first career no-hitter and fifth no-hitter in franchise history, by defeating the Pittsburgh Pirates 2–0 on June 16. Hughes walked two and struck out seven.
- Rube Foster (BOS):
  - Foster threw his first career no-hitter and sixth no-hitter in franchise history, by defeating the New York Yankees 2–0 on June 21. Foster walked three and struck out three.
- Bullet Joe Bush (PHA):
  - Bush threw his first career no-hitter and third no-hitter in franchise history, by defeating the Cleveland Indians 5–0 on August 26. Bush walked one and struck out seven.
- Dutch Leonard (BOS):
  - Leonard threw his first career no-hitter and seventh no-hitter in franchise history, by defeating the St. Louis Browns 4–0 on August 30. Leonard walked two and struck out three.

==== Other pitching accomplishments ====
- Grover Alexander (PHI):
  - Tied a Major League record for most shutout wins in a season, throwing 16 shutouts.
- Babe Ruth (BOS):
  - Tied an American League record for most shutout wins in a season by a left-handed pitcher, throwing nine shutouts.

=== Miscellaneous ===
- Detroit Tigers / Philadelphia Athletics:
  - Set a Major League record for most combined walks in a single game at 30, previously set in 1915 at 24, with the Detroit Tigers walking 12 batters and the Philadelphia Athletics walking 18, on May 9 in a game that Detroit won 16–2.
- New York Giants:
  - Set a Major League record for largest winning streak, winning 26 games from September 7, and ending following their September 30 loss to the Boston Braves. The streak broke the 21-game record previously held by the 1880 Chicago White Stockings (now-Chicago Cubs).
- Philadelphia Athletics:
  - Set the modern Major League record for most losses in a season on October 2 with 117. The previous record of 113 was set by the Washington Senators in 1904.
  - Set the modern Major League record for worst winning percentage with .235. The previous record of .252 was set by the Washington Senators in 1904.

== Home field attendance ==
Team name	Wins	%±	Home attendance	%±	Per game
Chicago White Sox	89	−4.3%	679,923	26.0%	8,830
Detroit Tigers	87	−13.0%	616,772	29.5%	8,010
New York Giants	86	24.6%	552,056	40.9%	7,078
Philadelphia Phillies	91	1.1%	515,365	14.6%	6,524
Boston Red Sox	91	−9.9%	496,397	−8.1%	6,364
Cleveland Indians	77	35.1%	492,106	208.9%	6,309
New York Yankees	80	15.9%	469,211	83.3%	5,939
Chicago Cubs	67	−8.2%	453,685	109.0%	5,743
Brooklyn Robins	94	17.5%	447,747	50.4%	5,740
St. Louis Browns	79	25.4%	335,740	123.3%	4,250
Boston Braves	89	7.2%	313,495	−16.7%	4,019
Pittsburgh Pirates	65	−11.0%	289,132	28.1%	3,707
Cincinnati Reds	60	−15.5%	255,846	16.9%	3,366
St. Louis Cardinals	60	−16.7%	224,308	−11.2%	2,951
Philadelphia Athletics	36	−16.3%	184,471	26.2%	2,427
Washington Senators	76	−10.6%	177,265	5.9%	2,188

== Venues ==
The Chicago Cubs leave West Side Park from which they played 30 seasons since 1885 (sans 1892) and moved into the home of the former Federal League team, Chicago Whales, at Weeghman Park, where they remain to this day as Wrigley Field.

Following Jim Dunn's purchase of the Cleveland Indians, League Park, home of the team, renamed to Dunn Field.

The Boston Red Sox played their final two games of the season, an October 3 doubleheader, at the home of the Boston Braves at Braves Field. They would also play their World Series home games (game 1 & 2) at Braves Field due to its larger capacity over their home at Fenway Park (40,000 to 27,000). This was the second year in a row where a World Series winning Red Sox used Braves Field.

== See also ==
- 1916 in baseball (Events, Births, Deaths)
