= 1911 Brooklyn Trolley Dodgers season =

1911 Brooklyn Trolley Dodgers
- League: National League
- Ballpark: Washington Park
- City: Brooklyn, New York
- Record: 64–86 (.427)
- League place: 7th
- Owners: Charles Ebbets, Henry Medicus
- President: Charles Ebbets
- Managers: Bill Dahlen

With the 1911 season, the Superbas changed the team name to the Brooklyn Trolley Dodgers. However, the team still struggled, finishing in seventh place.

== Regular season ==
The 1911 Brooklyn Trolley Dodgers

=== Season standings ===
National League
Team	W	L	Pct.	GB	Home	Road
New York Giants	99	54	.647	—	49‍–‍25	50‍–‍29
Chicago Cubs	92	62	.597	7½	49‍–‍32	43‍–‍30
Pittsburgh Pirates	85	69	.552	14½	48‍–‍29	37‍–‍40
Philadelphia Phillies	79	73	.520	19½	42‍–‍34	37‍–‍39
St. Louis Cardinals	75	74	.503	22	36‍–‍38	39‍–‍36
Cincinnati Reds	70	83	.458	29	38‍–‍42	32‍–‍41
Brooklyn Trolley Dodgers	64	86	.427	33½	31‍–‍42	33‍–‍44
Boston Rustlers	44	107	.291	54	19‍–‍54	25‍–‍53

=== Record vs. opponents ===
1911 National League record Sources:
Team	BSN	BRO	CHC	CIN	NYG	PHI	PIT	STL
Boston	—	12–10–1	5–17	4–17–1	7–15	6–16	3–19	7–13–3
Brooklyn	10–12–1	—	13–9	11–11	5–16–1	8–13–1	14–8	9–11–1
Chicago	17–5	9–13	—	14–8–1	11–11	15–7	10–12	16–6–2
Cincinnati	17–4–1	11–11	8–14–1	—	8–14	10–12	10–12–1	6–16–3
New York	15–7	16–5–1	11–11	14–8	—	12–10	16–6	15–7
Philadelphia	16–6	13–8–1	7–15	12–10	10–12	—	13–9	8–13
Pittsburgh	19–3	14–8	12–10	12–10–1	6–16	9–13	—	13–9
St. Louis	13–7–3	11–9–1	6–16–2	16–6–3	7–15	13–8	9–13	—

=== Notable transactions ===
- April 1911: Hub Northen was purchased by the Dodgers from the Cincinnati Reds.
- September 16, 1911: Elmer Steele was purchased by the Dodgers from the Pittsburgh Pirates.

=== Roster ===
1911 Brooklyn Trolley Dodgers
Roster
Pitchers: Raleigh Aitchison; Cy Barger; George Bell; Sandy Burk; Eddie Dent; Elmer Knetzer; Walt Miller; Pat Ragan; Nap Rucker; Jack Ryan; Doc Scanlan; Bill Schardt; Elmer Steele	Catchers: Bill Bergen; Tex Erwin; Bob Higgins; Otto Miller; Infielders: Bill Dahlen; Jake Daubert; John Hummel; Pryor McElveen; Red Smith; Tony Smith; Dolly Stark; Bert Tooley; Eddie Zimmerman	Outfielders: George Browne; Al Burch; Bob Coulson; Jud Daley; Bill Davidson; Al Humphrey; Larry LeJeune; Hy Myers; Hub Northen; Zack Wheat	Manager: Bill Dahlen

== Player stats ==
=== Batting ===
==== Starters by position ====
Note: Pos = Position; G = Games played; AB = At bats; H = Hits; Avg. = Batting average; HR = Home runs; RBI = Runs batted in

Pos	Player	G	AB	H	Avg.	HR	RBI
C	Bill Bergen	80	227	30	.132	0	10
1B	Jake Daubert	149	573	176	.307	5	45
2B	John Hummel	137	477	129	.270	5	58
3B	Eddie Zimmerman	122	417	77	.185	3	36
SS	Bert Tooley	119	433	89	.206	1	29
OF	Bob Coulson	146	521	122	.234	0	50
OF	Zack Wheat	140	534	153	.287	5	76
OF	Bill Davidson	87	292	68	.233	1	26

==== Other batters ====
Note: G = Games played; AB = At bats; H = Hits; Avg. = Batting average; HR = Home runs; RBI = Runs batted in

Player	G	AB	H	Avg.	HR	RBI
Tex Erwin	91	218	59	.271	7	34
Dolly Stark	70	193	57	.295	0	19
Al Burch	54	167	38	.228	0	7
Red Smith	28	111	29	.261	0	19
Hub Northen	19	76	24	.316	0	1
Jud Daley	19	65	15	.231	0	7
Otto Miller	25	62	13	.210	0	8
Hy Myers	13	43	7	.163	0	0
Tony Smith	13	40	6	.150	0	2
Pryor McElveen	16	31	6	.194	0	5
Al Humphrey	8	27	5	.185	0	0
Larry LeJeune	6	19	3	.158	0	2
George Browne	8	12	4	.333	0	2
Bob Higgins	4	10	3	.300	0	2
Bill Dahlen	1	3	0	.000	0	0

=== Pitching ===
==== Starting pitchers ====
Note: G = Games pitched; IP = Innings pitched; W = Wins; L = Losses; ERA = Earned run average; SO = Strikeouts

Player	G	IP	W	L	ERA	SO
Nap Rucker	48	315.2	22	18	2.71	190
Cy Barger	30	217.1	11	15	3.52	60
Doc Scanlan	22	113.2	3	10	3.64	45

==== Other pitchers ====
Note: G = Games pitched; IP = Innings pitched; W = Wins; L = Losses; ERA = Earned run average; SO = Strikeouts

Player	G	IP	W	L	ERA	SO
Elmer Knetzer	35	204.0	11	12	3.49	66
Bill Schardt	39	195.1	5	15	3.59	77
George Bell	19	101.0	5	6	4.28	28
Pat Ragan	22	93.2	4	3	2.11	39
Sandy Burk	13	58.0	1	3	5.12	15
Eddie Dent	5	31.2	2	1	3.69	3
Elmer Steele	5	23.0	0	0	3.13	9
Walt Miller	3	11.0	0	1	6.55	0
Jack Ryan	3	6.0	0	1	3.00	1

==== Relief pitchers ====
Note: G = Games pitched; W = Wins; L = Losses; SV = Saves; ERA = Earned run average; SO = Strikeouts

Player	G	W	L	SV	ERA	SO
Raleigh Aitchison	1	0	1	0	0.00	0
