= 1912 Brooklyn Trolley Dodgers season =

1912 Brooklyn Trolley Dodgers
- League: National League
- Ballpark: Washington Park
- City: Brooklyn, New York
- Record: 58–95 (.379)
- League place: 7th
- Owners: Charles Ebbets, Ed McKeever, Stephen McKeever
- President: Charles Ebbets
- Managers: Bill Dahlen

The 1912 Brooklyn Trolley Dodgers finished in seventh place with a 58–95 record.

== Offseason ==
- December 1911: Doc Scanlan was traded by the Trolley Dodgers to the Philadelphia Phillies for Eddie Stack.

== Regular season ==
=== Season standings ===
National League
Team	W	L	Pct.	GB	Home	Road
New York Giants	103	48	.682	—	49‍–‍25	54‍–‍23
Pittsburgh Pirates	93	58	.616	10	44‍–‍31	49‍–‍27
Chicago Cubs	91	59	.607	11½	46‍–‍30	45‍–‍29
Cincinnati Reds	75	78	.490	29	45‍–‍32	30‍–‍46
Philadelphia Phillies	73	79	.480	30½	34‍–‍41	39‍–‍38
St. Louis Cardinals	63	90	.412	41	37‍–‍40	26‍–‍50
Brooklyn Trolley Dodgers	58	95	.379	46	33‍–‍43	25‍–‍52
Boston Braves	52	101	.340	52	31‍–‍47	21‍–‍54

=== Record vs. opponents ===
1912 National League record Sources:
Team	BSN	BRO	CHC	CIN	NYG	PHI	PIT	STL
Boston	—	9–13	5–17	11–11	3–18–1	10–12	4–18–1	10–12
Brooklyn	13–9	—	5–17	6–16	6–16	9–13	8–14	11–10
Chicago	17–5	17–5	—	11–10–1	13–9–1	10–10	8–13	15–7
Cincinnati	11–11	16–6	10–11–1	—	6–16–1	8–14	11–11	13–9
New York	18–3–1	16–6	9–13–1	16–6–1	—	17–5	12–8	15–7
Philadelphia	12–10	13–9	10–10	14–8	5–17	—	8–14	11–11
Pittsburgh	18–4–1	14–8	13–8	11–11	8–12	14–8	—	15–7
St. Louis	12–10	10–11	7–15	9–13	7–15	11–11	7–15	—

=== Notable transactions ===
- May 7, 1912: Red Downs was purchased from the Trolley Dodgers by the Chicago Cubs.
- July 10, 1912: Cliff Curtis was purchased by the Trolley Dodgers from the Philadelphia Phillies.

=== Roster ===
1912 Brooklyn Trolley Dodgers
Roster
Pitchers: Frank Allen; Cy Barger; Sandy Burk; Cliff Curtis; Eddie Dent; Maury Kent; Elmer Knetzer; Pat Ragan; Nap Rucker; Bill Schardt; Eddie Stack; Earl Yingling	Catchers: Tex Erwin; Bob Higgins; Otto Miller; Ed Phelps; Infielders: George Cutshaw; Jake Daubert; Red Downs; Bob Fisher; John Hummel; Enos Kirkpatrick; Red Smith; Dolly Stark; Bert Tooley	Outfielders: Jud Daley; Herbie Moran; Hub Northen; Casey Stengel; Zack Wheat	Manager: Bill Dahlen

== Player stats ==
=== Batting ===
==== Starters by position ====
Note: Pos = Position; G = Games played; AB = At bats; H = Hits; Avg. = Batting average; HR = Home runs; RBI = Runs batted in

Pos	Player	G	AB	H	Avg.	HR	RBI
C	Otto Miller	98	316	88	.278	1	31
1B	Jake Daubert	145	559	172	.308	3	66
2B	George Cutshaw	102	357	100	.280	0	28
3B	Red Smith	128	486	139	.286	4	57
SS	Bert Tooley	77	265	62	.234	2	37
OF	Herbie Moran	130	508	140	.276	1	40
OF	Zack Wheat	123	453	138	.305	8	65
OF	Hub Northen	118	412	116	.282	3	46

==== Other batters ====
Note: G = Games played; AB = At bats; H = Hits; Avg. = Batting average; HR = Home runs; RBI = Runs batted in

Player	G	AB	H	Avg.	HR	RBI
John Hummel	122	411	116	.282	5	54
Bob Fisher	82	257	60	.233	0	26
Jud Daley	61	199	51	.256	1	13
Tex Erwin	59	133	28	.211	2	14
Ed Phelps	52	111	32	.288	0	23
Enos Kirkpatrick	32	94	18	.191	0	6
Casey Stengel	17	57	18	.316	1	13
Red Downs	9	32	8	.250	0	3
Dolly Stark	8	22	4	.182	0	2
Bob Higgins	1	2	0	.000	0	0

=== Pitching ===
==== Starting pitchers ====
Note: G = Games pitched; IP = Innings pitched; W = Wins; L = Losses; ERA = Earned run average; SO = Strikeouts

Player	G	IP	W	L	ERA	SO
Nap Rucker	45	297.2	18	21	2.21	151
Pat Ragan	36	208.0	7	18	3.63	101
Frank Allen	20	109.0	3	9	3.63	58

==== Other pitchers ====
Note: G = Games pitched; IP = Innings pitched; W = Wins; L = Losses; ERA = Earned run average; SO = Strikeouts

Player	G	IP	W	L	ERA	SO
Earl Yingling	25	163.0	6	11	3.59	51
Eddie Stack	28	142.0	7	5	3.36	45
Elmer Knetzer	33	140.1	7	9	4.55	61
Cy Barger	16	94.0	1	9	5.46	30
Maury Kent	20	93.0	5	5	4.84	24
Cliff Curtis	19	80.0	4	7	3.94	22

==== Relief pitchers ====
Note: G = Games pitched; W = Wins; L = Losses; SV = Saves; ERA = Earned run average; SO = Strikeouts

Player	G	W	L	SV	ERA	SO
Bill Schardt	7	0	1	1	4.35	7
Sandy Burk	2	0	0	0	3.24	2
Eddie Dent	1	0	0	0	36.00	1
