= 1912 Philadelphia Phillies season =

Major League Baseball season

1912 Philadelphia Phillies
- League: National League
- Ballpark: National League Park
- City: Philadelphia
- Owners: Horace Fogel
- Managers: Red Dooin

The 1912 Philadelphia Phillies season was a season in American baseball. The team finished fifth in the National League with a record of 73–79, 30 1/2 games behind the first-place New York Giants.

== Regular season ==
=== Season standings ===
National League
| Team | W | L | Pct. | GB | Home | Road |
|---|---|---|---|---|---|---|
| New York Giants | 103 | 48 | .682 | — | 49‍–‍25 | 54‍–‍23 |
| Pittsburgh Pirates | 93 | 58 | .616 | 10 | 44‍–‍31 | 49‍–‍27 |
| Chicago Cubs | 91 | 59 | .607 | 11½ | 46‍–‍30 | 45‍–‍29 |
| Cincinnati Reds | 75 | 78 | .490 | 29 | 45‍–‍32 | 30‍–‍46 |
| Philadelphia Phillies | 73 | 79 | .480 | 30½ | 34‍–‍41 | 39‍–‍38 |
| St. Louis Cardinals | 63 | 90 | .412 | 41 | 37‍–‍40 | 26‍–‍50 |
| Brooklyn Trolley Dodgers | 58 | 95 | .379 | 46 | 33‍–‍43 | 25‍–‍52 |
| Boston Braves | 52 | 101 | .340 | 52 | 31‍–‍47 | 21‍–‍54 |

=== Record vs. opponents ===
1912 National League record Sources:
| Team | BSN | BRO | CHC | CIN | NYG | PHI | PIT | STL |
|---|---|---|---|---|---|---|---|---|
| Boston | — | 9–13 | 5–17 | 11–11 | 3–18–1 | 10–12 | 4–18–1 | 10–12 |
| Brooklyn | 13–9 | — | 5–17 | 6–16 | 6–16 | 9–13 | 8–14 | 11–10 |
| Chicago | 17–5 | 17–5 | — | 11–10–1 | 13–9–1 | 10–10 | 8–13 | 15–7 |
| Cincinnati | 11–11 | 16–6 | 10–11–1 | — | 6–16–1 | 8–14 | 11–11 | 13–9 |
| New York | 18–3–1 | 16–6 | 9–13–1 | 16–6–1 | — | 17–5 | 12–8 | 15–7 |
| Philadelphia | 12–10 | 13–9 | 10–10 | 14–8 | 5–17 | — | 8–14 | 11–11 |
| Pittsburgh | 18–4–1 | 14–8 | 13–8 | 11–11 | 8–12 | 14–8 | — | 15–7 |
| St. Louis | 12–10 | 10–11 | 7–15 | 9–13 | 7–15 | 11–11 | 7–15 | — |

=== Notable transactions ===
- June 21, 1912: John Titus was traded by the Phillies to the Boston Braves for Doc Miller.
- July 1912: Hank Ritter was purchased by the Phillies from the East Liverpool Potters.

=== Roster ===
1912 Philadelphia Phillies
Roster
| Pitchers: Pete Alexander; Ad Brennan; George Chalmers; Cliff Curtis; Happy Finneran; Rube Marshall; Erskine Mayer; Earl Moore; Red Nelson; Frank Nicholson; Hank Ritter; Eppa Rixey; Tom Seaton; Toots Schultz; Huck Wallace | Catchers: Red Dooin; Peaches Graham; Bill Killefer; Mike Loan; Pat Moran; Infielders: Jack Boyle; Bill Brinker; John Dodge; Cozy Dolan; Mickey Doolan; Tom Downey; Otto Knabe; Hans Lobert; Fred Luderus; Jimmie Savage; Gene Steinbrenner; Jimmy Walsh | Outfielders: Gavvy Cravath; Sherry Magee; George Mangus; Doc Miller; Dode Paskert; John Titus; Other batters: George Browne | Manager: Red Dooin |

== Player stats ==
=== Batting ===
==== Starters by position ====
Note: Pos = Position; G = Games played; AB = At bats; H = Hits; Avg. = Batting average; HR = Home runs; RBI = Runs batted in

| Pos | Player | G | AB | H | Avg. | HR | RBI |
|---|---|---|---|---|---|---|---|
| C | Bill Killefer | 85 | 268 | 60 | .224 | 1 | 21 |
| 1B | Fred Luderus | 148 | 572 | 147 | .257 | 10 | 69 |
| 2B | Otto Knabe | 126 | 426 | 120 | .282 | 0 | 46 |
| SS | Mickey Doolin | 146 | 532 | 137 | .258 | 1 | 62 |
| 3B | Hans Lobert | 65 | 257 | 84 | .327 | 2 | 33 |
| OF | Sherry Magee | 132 | 464 | 142 | .306 | 6 | 66 |
| OF | Dode Paskert | 145 | 540 | 170 | .315 | 2 | 43 |
| OF | Gavvy Cravath | 130 | 436 | 124 | .284 | 11 | 70 |

==== Other batters ====
Note: G = Games played; AB = At bats; H = Hits; Avg. = Batting average; HR = Home runs; RBI = Runs batted in

| Player | G | AB | H | Avg. | HR | RBI |
|---|---|---|---|---|---|---|
| Red Dooin | 69 | 184 | 43 | .234 | 0 | 22 |
| Doc Miller | 67 | 177 | 51 | .288 | 0 | 21 |
| Tom Downey | 54 | 171 | 50 | .292 | 1 | 23 |
| John Titus | 45 | 157 | 43 | .274 | 3 | 22 |
| Jimmy Walsh | 51 | 150 | 40 | .267 | 2 | 19 |
| John Dodge | 30 | 92 | 11 | .120 | 0 | 3 |
| Peaches Graham | 24 | 59 | 17 | .288 | 1 | 4 |
| Cozy Dolan | 11 | 50 | 14 | .280 | 0 | 7 |
| Pat Moran | 13 | 26 | 3 | .115 | 0 | 1 |
| George Mangus | 10 | 25 | 5 | .200 | 0 | 3 |
| Jack Boyle | 15 | 25 | 7 | .280 | 0 | 2 |
| Bill Brinker | 9 | 18 | 4 | .222 | 0 | 2 |
| Gene Steinbrenner | 3 | 9 | 2 | .222 | 0 | 1 |
| George Browne | 6 | 5 | 1 | .200 | 0 | 0 |
| Jimmie Savage | 2 | 3 | 0 | .000 | 0 | 0 |
| Mike Loan | 1 | 2 | 1 | .500 | 0 | 0 |

=== Pitching ===
==== Starting pitchers ====
Note: G = Games pitched; IP = Innings pitched; W = Wins; L = Losses; ERA = Earned run average; SO = Strikeouts

| Player | G | IP | W | L | ERA | SO |
|---|---|---|---|---|---|---|
| Pete Alexander | 46 | 310.1 | 19 | 17 | 2.81 | 195 |
| Tom Seaton | 44 | 255.0 | 16 | 12 | 3.28 | 118 |
| Earl Moore | 31 | 182.1 | 9 | 14 | 3.31 | 79 |
| Ad Brennan | 27 | 174.0 | 11 | 9 | 3.57 | 78 |
| Eppa Rixey | 23 | 162.0 | 10 | 10 | 2.50 | 59 |
| Cliff Curtis | 10 | 50.0 | 2 | 5 | 3.24 | 20 |

==== Other pitchers ====
Note: G = Games pitched; IP = Innings pitched; W = Wins; L = Losses; ERA = Earned run average; SO = Strikeouts

| Player | G | IP | W | L | ERA | SO |
|---|---|---|---|---|---|---|
| George Chalmers | 12 | 57.2 | 3 | 4 | 3.28 | 22 |
| Happy Finneran | 14 | 46.1 | 0 | 2 | 2.53 | 10 |
| Erskine Mayer | 7 | 21.1 | 0 | 1 | 6.33 | 5 |
| Red Nelson | 4 | 19.1 | 2 | 0 | 3.72 | 2 |
| Rube Marshall | 2 | 3.0 | 0 | 1 | 21.00 | 2 |

==== Relief pitchers ====
Note: G = Games pitched; W = Wins; L = Losses; SV = Saves; ERA = Earned run average; SO = Strikeouts

| Player | G | W | L | SV | ERA | SO |
|---|---|---|---|---|---|---|
| Toots Shultz | 22 | 1 | 4 | 1 | 4.58 | 20 |
| Huck Wallace | 4 | 0 | 0 | 0 | 0.00 | 4 |
| Hank Ritter | 3 | 0 | 0 | 0 | 4.50 | 1 |
| Frank Nicholson | 2 | 0 | 0 | 0 | 6.75 | 1 |
