= 1912 St. Louis Cardinals season =

Major League Baseball season

1912 St. Louis Cardinals
- League: National League
- Ballpark: Robison Field
- City: St. Louis, Missouri
- Record: 63–90 (.412)
- League place: 6th
- Owners: Helene Hathaway Britton
- Managers: Roger Bresnahan

The 1912 St. Louis Cardinals season was the team's 31st season in St. Louis, Missouri and its 21st season in the National League. The Cardinals went 63–90 during the season and finished sixth out of eight teams in the National League.

== Regular season ==
=== Season standings ===
National League
| Team | W | L | Pct. | GB | Home | Road |
|---|---|---|---|---|---|---|
| New York Giants | 103 | 48 | .682 | — | 49‍–‍25 | 54‍–‍23 |
| Pittsburgh Pirates | 93 | 58 | .616 | 10 | 44‍–‍31 | 49‍–‍27 |
| Chicago Cubs | 91 | 59 | .607 | 11½ | 46‍–‍30 | 45‍–‍29 |
| Cincinnati Reds | 75 | 78 | .490 | 29 | 45‍–‍32 | 30‍–‍46 |
| Philadelphia Phillies | 73 | 79 | .480 | 30½ | 34‍–‍41 | 39‍–‍38 |
| St. Louis Cardinals | 63 | 90 | .412 | 41 | 37‍–‍40 | 26‍–‍50 |
| Brooklyn Trolley Dodgers | 58 | 95 | .379 | 46 | 33‍–‍43 | 25‍–‍52 |
| Boston Braves | 52 | 101 | .340 | 52 | 31‍–‍47 | 21‍–‍54 |

=== Record vs. opponents ===
1912 National League record Sources:
| Team | BSN | BRO | CHC | CIN | NYG | PHI | PIT | STL |
|---|---|---|---|---|---|---|---|---|
| Boston | — | 9–13 | 5–17 | 11–11 | 3–18–1 | 10–12 | 4–18–1 | 10–12 |
| Brooklyn | 13–9 | — | 5–17 | 6–16 | 6–16 | 9–13 | 8–14 | 11–10 |
| Chicago | 17–5 | 17–5 | — | 11–10–1 | 13–9–1 | 10–10 | 8–13 | 15–7 |
| Cincinnati | 11–11 | 16–6 | 10–11–1 | — | 6–16–1 | 8–14 | 11–11 | 13–9 |
| New York | 18–3–1 | 16–6 | 9–13–1 | 16–6–1 | — | 17–5 | 12–8 | 15–7 |
| Philadelphia | 12–10 | 13–9 | 10–10 | 14–8 | 5–17 | — | 8–14 | 11–11 |
| Pittsburgh | 18–4–1 | 14–8 | 13–8 | 11–11 | 8–12 | 14–8 | — | 15–7 |
| St. Louis | 12–10 | 10–11 | 7–15 | 9–13 | 7–15 | 11–11 | 7–15 | — |

=== Notable transactions ===
- September 16, 1912: Jimmy Whelan was drafted by the Cardinals from the Ogden Canners in the 1912 rule 5 draft.

=== Roster ===
1912 St. Louis Cardinals
Roster
| Pitchers: Sandy Burk; Gene Dale; Wheezer Dell; Bob Ewing; Rube Geyer; Dan Griner; Bob Harmon; Roland Howell; Lou Lowdermilk; Pol Perritt; Phil Redding; Slim Sallee; Bill Steele; Joe Willis; Gene Woodburn; George Zackert | Catchers: Jack Bliss; Roger Bresnahan; Ed Burns; Mike Murphy; Frank Snyder; Ivey Wingo; Infielders: Jim Galloway; Arnold Hauser; Miller Huggins; John Kelleher; Ed Konetchy; John Mercer; Mike Mowrey; Ray Rolling; Wally Smith; Possum Whitted | Outfielders: Ted Cather; Rube Ellis; Steve Evans; Frank Gilhooley; Lee Magee; Elmer Miller; Rebel Oakes; Denney Wilie; Other batters: Jim Clark | Manager: Roger Bresnahan |

== Player stats ==
=== Batting ===
==== Starters by position ====
Note: Pos = Position; G = Games played; AB = At bats; H = Hits; Avg. = Batting average; HR = Home runs; RBI = Runs batted in

| Pos | Player | G | AB | H | Avg. | HR | RBI |
|---|---|---|---|---|---|---|---|
| C | Ivey Wingo | 100 | 310 | 82 | .265 | 2 | 44 |
| 1B | Ed Konetchy | 143 | 538 | 169 | .314 | 8 | 82 |
| 2B | Miller Huggins | 120 | 431 | 131 | .304 | 0 | 29 |
| SS | Arnold Hauser | 133 | 479 | 124 | .259 | 1 | 42 |
| 3B | Mike Mowrey | 114 | 408 | 104 | .255 | 2 | 50 |
| OF | Steve Evans | 135 | 491 | 139 | .283 | 6 | 72 |
| OF | Rebel Oakes | 136 | 495 | 139 | .281 | 3 | 58 |
| OF | Lee Magee | 128 | 458 | 133 | .290 | 0 | 40 |

==== Other batters ====
Note: G = Games played; AB = At bats; H = Hits; Avg. = Batting average; HR = Home runs; RBI = Runs batted in

| Player | G | AB | H | Avg. | HR | RBI |
|---|---|---|---|---|---|---|
| Rube Ellis | 109 | 305 | 82 | .269 | 4 | 33 |
| Wally Smith | 75 | 219 | 56 | .256 | 0 | 26 |
| Jack Bliss | 49 | 114 | 28 | .246 | 0 | 18 |
| Roger Bresnahan | 48 | 108 | 36 | .333 | 1 | 15 |
| Jim Galloway | 21 | 54 | 10 | .185 | 0 | 4 |
| Frank Gilhooley | 13 | 49 | 11 | .224 | 0 | 2 |
| Denney Wilie | 30 | 48 | 11 | .229 | 0 | 6 |
| Possum Whitted | 12 | 46 | 12 | .261 | 0 | 7 |
| Elmer Miller | 12 | 37 | 7 | .189 | 0 | 3 |
| Ted Cather | 5 | 19 | 8 | .421 | 0 | 2 |
| Frank Snyder | 11 | 18 | 2 | .111 | 0 | 0 |
| Ray Rolling | 5 | 15 | 3 | .200 | 0 | 0 |
| John Kelleher | 8 | 12 | 4 | .333 | 0 | 1 |
| Jim Clark | 2 | 1 | 0 | .000 | 0 | 0 |
| John Mercer | 1 | 1 | 0 | .000 | 0 | 0 |
| Ed Burns | 1 | 1 | 0 | .000 | 0 | 1 |
| Mike Murphy | 1 | 1 | 0 | .000 | 0 | 1 |

=== Pitching ===
==== Starting pitchers ====
Note: G = Games pitched; IP = Innings pitched; W = Wins; L = Losses; ERA = Earned run average; SO = Strikeouts

| Player | G | IP | W | L | ERA | SO |
|---|---|---|---|---|---|---|
| Slim Sallee | 48 | 294.0 | 16 | 17 | 2.60 | 108 |
| Bob Harmon | 43 | 268.0 | 18 | 18 | 3.93 | 73 |
| Phil Redding | 3 | 25.1 | 2 | 1 | 4.97 | 9 |
| Bob Ewing | 1 | 1.1 | 0 | 0 | 0.00 | 0 |

==== Other pitchers ====
Note: G = Games pitched; IP = Innings pitched; W = Wins; L = Losses; ERA = Earned run average; SO = Strikeouts

| Player | G | IP | W | L | ERA | SO |
|---|---|---|---|---|---|---|
| Bill Steele | 40 | 194.0 | 9 | 13 | 4.69 | 67 |
| Rube Geyer | 41 | 181.0 | 7 | 14 | 3.28 | 61 |
| Joe Willis | 31 | 129.2 | 4 | 9 | 4.44 | 55 |
| Dan Griner | 12 | 54.0 | 3 | 4 | 3.17 | 20 |
| Gene Woodburn | 20 | 48.1 | 1 | 4 | 5.59 | 25 |
| Sandy Burk | 12 | 44.2 | 1 | 3 | 2.42 | 17 |
| Pol Perritt | 6 | 31.0 | 1 | 1 | 3.19 | 13 |
| Lou Lowdermilk | 4 | 15.0 | 1 | 1 | 3.00 | 2 |

==== Relief pitchers ====
Note: G = Games pitched; W = Wins; L = Losses; SV = Saves; ERA = Earned run average; SO = Strikeouts

| Player | G | W | L | SV | ERA | SO |
|---|---|---|---|---|---|---|
| Gene Dale | 19 | 0 | 5 | 0 | 6.57 | 37 |
| Wheezer Dell | 3 | 0 | 0 | 0 | 11.57 | 0 |
| Roland Howell | 3 | 0 | 0 | 0 | 27.00 | 0 |
| George Zackert | 1 | 0 | 0 | 0 | 18.00 | 0 |
