= 1911 Philadelphia Phillies season =

Major League Baseball season

1911 Philadelphia Phillies
- League: National League
- Ballpark: National League Park
- City: Philadelphia
- Owners: Horace Fogel
- Managers: Red Dooin

The 1911 Philadelphia Phillies season was a season in Major League Baseball. The Phillies finished fourth in the National League with a record of 79 wins and 73 losses.

== Offseason ==
=== City Series ===
Phillies Hall of Fame pitcher Grover Cleveland Alexander made his Philadelphia debut during the pre-season City Series against the Philadelphia Athletics. Alexander pitched five innings of no-hit no-run baseball against the A's. He would make his official major league debut on April 15, 1911.

=== Notable transactions ===
- November 12, 1910: Johnny Bates, Eddie Grant, George McQuillan and Lew Moren were traded by the Phillies to the Cincinnati Reds for Jack Rowan, Fred Beebe, Hans Lobert and Dode Paskert.

== Regular season ==
=== Season standings ===
National League
Team	W	L	Pct.	GB	Home	Road
New York Giants	99	54	.647	—	49‍–‍25	50‍–‍29
Chicago Cubs	92	62	.597	7½	49‍–‍32	43‍–‍30
Pittsburgh Pirates	85	69	.552	14½	48‍–‍29	37‍–‍40
Philadelphia Phillies	79	73	.520	19½	42‍–‍34	37‍–‍39
St. Louis Cardinals	75	74	.503	22	36‍–‍38	39‍–‍36
Cincinnati Reds	70	83	.458	29	38‍–‍42	32‍–‍41
Brooklyn Trolley Dodgers	64	86	.427	33½	31‍–‍42	33‍–‍44
Boston Rustlers	44	107	.291	54	19‍–‍54	25‍–‍53

=== Record vs. opponents ===
1911 National League record Sources:
Team	BSN	BRO	CHC	CIN	NYG	PHI	PIT	STL
Boston	—	12–10–1	5–17	4–17–1	7–15	6–16	3–19	7–13–3
Brooklyn	10–12–1	—	13–9	11–11	5–16–1	8–13–1	14–8	9–11–1
Chicago	17–5	9–13	—	14–8–1	11–11	15–7	10–12	16–6–2
Cincinnati	17–4–1	11–11	8–14–1	—	8–14	10–12	10–12–1	6–16–3
New York	15–7	16–5–1	11–11	14–8	—	12–10	16–6	15–7
Philadelphia	16–6	13–8–1	7–15	12–10	10–12	—	13–9	8–13
Pittsburgh	19–3	14–8	12–10	12–10–1	6–16	9–13	—	13–9
St. Louis	13–7–3	11–9–1	6–16–2	16–6–3	7–15	13–8	9–13	—

=== Notable transactions ===
- August 18, 1911: Jack Rowan was traded by the Phillies to the Chicago Cubs for Cliff Curtis.
- September 11, 1911: Red Kleinow was released by the Phillies.

=== Roster ===
1911 Philadelphia Phillies
Roster
Pitchers: Pete Alexander; Fred Beebe; Ad Brennan; Bill Burns; George Chalmers; Cliff Curtis; Bob Ewing; Bert Hall; Bert Humphries; Earl Moore; Troy Puckett; Jack Rowan; Toots Schultz; Jake Smith; Eddie Stack; Buck Stanley	Catchers: Dick Cotter; Red Dooin; Bill Killefer; Red Kleinow; Bunny Madden; Pat Moran; John Quinn; Tubby Spencer; Infielders: Kitty Bransfield; Mickey Doolan; Otto Knabe; Hans Lobert; Fred Luderus	Outfielders: Fred Beck; Clarence Lehr; Sherry Magee; Paddy Mayes; Dode Paskert; Roy Thomas; John Titus; Jimmy Walsh; Harry Welchonce; Other batters: Hughie Miller	Manager: Red Dooin

== Player stats ==
=== Batting ===
==== Starters by position ====
Note: Pos = Position; G = Games played; AB = At bats; H = Hits; Avg. = Batting average; HR = Home runs; RBI = Runs batted in

Pos	Player	G	AB	H	Avg.	HR	RBI
C	Red Dooin	74	247	81	.328	1	16
1B	Fred Luderus	146	551	166	.301	16	99
2B	Otto Knabe	142	528	125	.237	1	42
SS	Mickey Doolin	146	512	122	.238	1	49
3B	Hans Lobert	147	541	154	.285	9	72
OF	John Titus	76	236	67	.284	8	26
OF	Sherry Magee	121	445	128	.288	15	94
OF	Dode Paskert	153	560	153	.273	4	47

==== Other batters ====
Note: G = Games played; AB = At bats; H = Hits; Avg. = Batting average; HR = Home runs; RBI = Runs batted in

Player	G	AB	H	Avg.	HR	RBI
Jimmy Walsh	94	289	78	.270	1	31
Fred Beck	66	210	59	.281	3	25
Pat Moran	34	103	19	.184	0	8
Bunny Madden	28	76	21	.276	0	4
Harry Welchonce	26	66	14	.212	0	6
Dick Cotter	20	46	13	.283	0	5
Kitty Bransfield	23	43	11	.256	0	3
Tubby Spencer	11	32	5	.156	1	3
Roy Thomas	21	30	5	.167	0	2
Clarence Lehr	23	27	4	.148	0	2
Bill Killefer	6	16	3	.188	0	2
Red Kleinow	4	8	1	.125	0	0
Paddy Mayes	5	5	0	.000	0	0
John Quinn	1	2	0	.000	0	0
Hughie Miller	1	0	0	----	0	0

=== Pitching ===
==== Starting pitchers ====
Note: G = Games pitched; IP = Innings pitched; W = Wins; L = Losses; ERA = Earned run average; SO = Strikeouts

Player	G	IP	W	L	ERA	SO
Pete Alexander	48	367.0	28	13	2.57	227
Earl Moore	42	308.1	15	19	2.63	174
Bill Burns	21	121.0	6	10	3.42	47
Eddie Stack	13	77.2	5	5	3.59	36
Fred Beebe	9	48.1	3	3	4.47	20
Bob Ewing	4	24.0	0	1	7.88	12

==== Other pitchers ====
Note: G = Games pitched; IP = Innings pitched; W = Wins; L = Losses; ERA = Earned run average; SO = Strikeouts

Player	G	IP	W	L	ERA	SO
George Chalmers	38	208.2	13	10	3.11	101
Jack Rowan	12	45.2	2	4	4.73	17
Cliff Curtis	8	45.0	2	1	2.60	13
Bert Humphries	11	41.0	3	1	4.17	13
Toots Shultz	5	25.0	0	3	9.36	9
Ad Brennan	5	22.2	2	1	3.57	12

==== Relief pitchers ====
Note: G = Games pitched; W = Wins; L = Losses; SV = Saves; ERA = Earned run average; SO = Strikeouts

Player	G	W	L	SV	ERA	SO
Bert Hall	7	0	1	0	4.00	8
Buck Stanley	4	0	0	0	6.35	5
Jake Smith	2	0	0	0	0.00	0
Jimmy Walsh	1	0	1	0	13.50	1
Troy Puckett	1	0	0	0	13.50	1
