= 1912 Chicago Cubs season =

1912 Chicago Cubs
- League: National League
- Ballpark: West Side Park
- City: Chicago
- Record: 91–59 (.607)
- League place: 3rd
- Owners: Charles Murphy
- Managers: Frank Chance

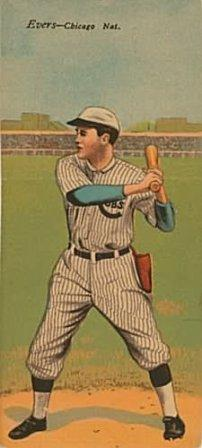
Front of a 1912 T201 tobacco card. Appears to depict Johnny Evers.

The 1912 Chicago Cubs season was the 41st season of the Chicago Cubs franchise, the 37th in the National League and the 20th at West Side Park. The Cubs finished third in the National League with a record of 91–59. Third baseman Heinie Zimmerman led the circuit in home runs, batting average, and slugging percentage.

== Regular season ==
=== Season standings ===
National League
Team	W	L	Pct.	GB	Home	Road
New York Giants	103	48	.682	—	49‍–‍25	54‍–‍23
Pittsburgh Pirates	93	58	.616	10	44‍–‍31	49‍–‍27
Chicago Cubs	91	59	.607	11½	46‍–‍30	45‍–‍29
Cincinnati Reds	75	78	.490	29	45‍–‍32	30‍–‍46
Philadelphia Phillies	73	79	.480	30½	34‍–‍41	39‍–‍38
St. Louis Cardinals	63	90	.412	41	37‍–‍40	26‍–‍50
Brooklyn Trolley Dodgers	58	95	.379	46	33‍–‍43	25‍–‍52
Boston Braves	52	101	.340	52	31‍–‍47	21‍–‍54

=== Record vs. opponents ===
1912 National League record Sources:
Team	BSN	BRO	CHC	CIN	NYG	PHI	PIT	STL
Boston	—	9–13	5–17	11–11	3–18–1	10–12	4–18–1	10–12
Brooklyn	13–9	—	5–17	6–16	6–16	9–13	8–14	11–10
Chicago	17–5	17–5	—	11–10–1	13–9–1	10–10	8–13	15–7
Cincinnati	11–11	16–6	10–11–1	—	6–16–1	8–14	11–11	13–9
New York	18–3–1	16–6	9–13–1	16–6–1	—	17–5	12–8	15–7
Philadelphia	12–10	13–9	10–10	14–8	5–17	—	8–14	11–11
Pittsburgh	18–4–1	14–8	13–8	11–11	8–12	14–8	—	15–7
St. Louis	12–10	10–11	7–15	9–13	7–15	11–11	7–15	—

== Roster ==
1912 Chicago Cubs
Roster
Pitchers: Mordecai Brown; Larry Cheney; King Cole; Ensign Cottrell; Jimmy Lavender; Lefty Leifield; Grover Lowdermilk; Len Madden; Harry McIntire; Jim Moroney; George Pierce; Bill Powell; Ed Reulbach; Lew Richie; Charlie Smith; Rudy Sommers; Fred Toney; Joe Vernon	Catchers: Jimmy Archer; Harry Chapman; Dick Cotter; Mike Hechinger; Tom Needham; George Yantz; Infielders: Frank Chance; Tom Downey; Red Downs; Johnny Evers; Ed Lennox; Charley Moore; Vic Saier; Joe Tinker; Heinie Zimmerman	Outfielders: Wilbur Good; Solly Hofman; Tommy Leach; Ward Miller; Wildfire Schulte; Jimmy Sheckard; Cy Williams	Manager: Frank Chance

== Player stats ==
=== Batting ===
==== Starters by position ====
Note: Pos = Position; G = Games played; AB = At bats; H = Hits; Avg. = Batting average; HR = Home runs; RBI = Runs batted in

Pos	Player	G	AB	H	Avg.	HR	RBI
C	Jimmy Archer	120	385	109	.283	5	58
1B	Vic Saier	122	451	130	.288	2	61
2B	Johnny Evers	143	478	163	.341	1	63
3B	Heinie Zimmerman	145	557	207	.372	14	104 (a)
SS	Joe Tinker	142	550	155	.282	0	75
LF	Jimmy Sheckard	146	523	128	.245	3	47
CF	Tommy Leach	82	265	64	.242	2	32
RF	Frank Schulte	139	553	146	.264	12	64

(a) Baseball Reference and Retrosheet have his 1912 RBI total at 104. Baseball Almanac and The Baseball Cube have his RBI total at 99.

==== Other batters ====
Note: G = Games played; AB = At bats; H = Hits; Avg. = Batting average; HR = Home runs; RBI = Runs batted in

Player	G	AB	H	Avg.	HR	RBI
Ward Miller	86	241	74	.307	0	22
Solly Hofman	36	125	34	.272	0	20
Red Downs	43	95	25	.263	1	15
Tom Needham	33	90	16	.178	0	12
Ed Lennox	27	81	19	.235	1	17
Cy Williams	28	62	15	.242	0	1
Dick Cotter	26	54	15	.278	0	10
Wilbur Good	39	35	5	.143	0	1
Tom Downey	13	22	4	.182	0	4
Charley Moore	5	9	2	.222	0	1
Frank Chance	2	5	1	.200	0	0
Harry Chapman	1	4	1	.250	0	1
Mike Hechinger	2	3	0	.000	0	0
George Yantz	1	1	1	1.000	0	0

=== Pitching ===
==== Starting pitchers ====
Note: G = Games pitched; IP = Innings pitched; W = Wins; L = Losses; ERA = Earned run average; SO = Strikeouts

Player	G	IP	W	L	ERA	SO
Larry Cheney	42	303.1	26	10	2.85	140
Jimmy Lavender	42	251.2	16	13	3.04	109
Lew Richie	39	238.0	16	8	2.95	69

==== Other pitchers ====
Note: G = Games pitched; IP = Innings pitched; W = Wins; L = Losses; ERA = Earned run average; SO = Strikeouts

Player	G	IP	W	L	ERA	SO
Ed Reulbach	39	169.0	10	6	3.78	75
Charlie Smith	20	94.0	7	4	4.21	47
Mordecai Brown	15	88.2	5	6	2.64	34
Lefty Leifield	13	70.2	7	2	2.42	23
Fred Toney	9	24.0	1	2	5.25	9
Jim Moroney	10	23.2	1	1	4.56	5
Harry McIntire	4	23.2	1	2	3.80	8
King Cole	8	19.0	1	2	10.89	9
George Pierce	3	14.2	0	0	5.52	9
Grover Lowdermilk	2	13.0	0	1	9.69	8
Len Madden	6	12.1	0	1	2.92	5

==== Relief pitchers ====
Note: G = Games pitched; W = Wins; L = Losses; SV = Saves; ERA = Earned run average; SO = Strikeouts

Player	G	W	L	SV	ERA	SO
Joe Vernon	1	0	0	0	11.25	1
Ensign Cottrell	1	0	0	0	9.00	1
Rudy Sommers	1	0	1	0	3.00	2
Bill Powell	1	0	0	0	9.00	0

== Awards and honors ==
=== League top five finishers ===
Larry Cheney

- #1 wins (26)

Johnny Evers

- #2 on-base percentage (.431)
- #4 batting average (.341)

Frank Schulte

- #2 home runs (12)

Heinie Zimmerman

- #1 batting average (.372)
- #1 home runs (14)
- #1 slugging percentage (.571)
- #3 runs batted in (99)
- #5 on-base percentage (.418)
