= 1911 Pittsburgh Pirates season =

1911 Pittsburgh Pirates
- League: National League
- Ballpark: Forbes Field
- City: Pittsburgh, Pennsylvania (Note: From 1882-1906, the team played in Allegheny, Pennsylvania, which became annexed by Pittsburgh as the North Side in 1907.)
- Owners: Barney Dreyfuss
- Managers: Fred Clarke

The 1911 Pittsburgh (Note: In the early 20th century and earlier, the name of Pittsburgh was spelled both with and without the final 'h'.) Pirates season was the 30th season of the Pittsburgh Pirates franchise; the 25th in the National League. The Pirates finished third in the league standings with a record of 85–69.

== Regular season ==
=== Season standings ===
National League
Team	W	L	Pct.	GB	Home	Road
New York Giants	99	54	.647	—	49‍–‍25	50‍–‍29
Chicago Cubs	92	62	.597	7½	49‍–‍32	43‍–‍30
Pittsburgh Pirates	85	69	.552	14½	48‍–‍29	37‍–‍40
Philadelphia Phillies	79	73	.520	19½	42‍–‍34	37‍–‍39
St. Louis Cardinals	75	74	.503	22	36‍–‍38	39‍–‍36
Cincinnati Reds	70	83	.458	29	38‍–‍42	32‍–‍41
Brooklyn Trolley Dodgers	64	86	.427	33½	31‍–‍42	33‍–‍44
Boston Rustlers	44	107	.291	54	19‍–‍54	25‍–‍53

=== Record vs. opponents ===
1911 National League record Sources:
Team	BSN	BRO	CHC	CIN	NYG	PHI	PIT	STL
Boston	—	12–10–1	5–17	4–17–1	7–15	6–16	3–19	7–13–3
Brooklyn	10–12–1	—	13–9	11–11	5–16–1	8–13–1	14–8	9–11–1
Chicago	17–5	9–13	—	14–8–1	11–11	15–7	10–12	16–6–2
Cincinnati	17–4–1	11–11	8–14–1	—	8–14	10–12	10–12–1	6–16–3
New York	15–7	16–5–1	11–11	14–8	—	12–10	16–6	15–7
Philadelphia	16–6	13–8–1	7–15	12–10	10–12	—	13–9	8–13
Pittsburgh	19–3	14–8	12–10	12–10–1	6–16	9–13	—	13–9
St. Louis	13–7–3	11–9–1	6–16–2	16–6–3	7–15	13–8	9–13	—

=== Roster ===
1911 Pittsburgh Pirates
Roster
Pitchers: Babe Adams; Howie Camnitz; Ensign Cottrell; Jack Ferry; Harry Gardner; Claude Hendrix; Lefty Leifield; Judge Nagle; Marty O'Toole; Deacon Phillippe; Hank Robinson; Sherry Smith; Elmer Steele; Kirby White	Catchers: George Gibson; Billy Kelly; Mike Simon; Infielders: Bobby Byrne; John Flynn; Newt Hunter; Bill Keen; Mickey Keliher; Alex McCarthy; Bill McKechnie; Dots Miller; Honus Wagner	Outfielders: Vin Campbell; Max Carey; Fred Clarke; Jerry Dorsey; Tommy Leach; Chief Wilson; Other batters: John Shovlin	Manager: Fred Clarke

== Player stats ==
=== Batting ===
==== Starters by position ====
Note: Pos = Position; G = Games played; AB = At bats; H = Hits; Avg. = Batting average; HR = Home runs; RBI = Runs batted in

Pos	Player	G	AB	H	Avg.	HR	RBI
C	George Gibson	100	311	65	.209	0	19
1B	Newt Hunter	65	209	53	.254	2	24
2B	Dots Miller	137	470	126	.268	6	78
SS	Honus Wagner	130	473	158	.334	9	89
3B	Bobby Byrne	153	598	155	.259	2	52
OF	Fred Clarke	110	392	127	.324	5	49
OF	Chief Wilson	148	544	163	.300	12	107
OF	Max Carey	129	427	110	.258	5	43

==== Other batters ====
Note: G = Games played; AB = At bats; H = Hits; Avg. = Batting average; HR = Home runs; RBI = Runs batted in

Player	G	AB	H	Avg.	HR	RBI
Tommy Leach	108	386	92	.238	3	43
Bill McKechnie	104	321	73	.227	2	37
Mike Simon	71	215	49	.228	0	22
Alex McCarthy	50	150	36	.240	2	31
Vin Campbell	42	93	29	.312	0	10
John Flynn	33	59	12	.203	0	3
Billy Kelly	6	8	1	.125	0	0
Bill Keen	6	7	0	.000	0	0
Mickey Keliher	3	7	0	.000	0	0
Jerry Dorsey	2	6	0	.000	0	0
John Shovlin	2	1	0	.000	0	0

=== Pitching ===
==== Starting pitchers ====
Note: G = Games pitched; IP = Innings pitched; W = Wins; L = Losses; ERA = Earned run average; SO = Strikeouts

Player	G	IP	W	L	ERA	SO
Lefty Leifield	42	318.0	16	16	2.63	111
Babe Adams	40	293.1	22	12	2.33	133
Howie Camnitz	40	267.2	20	15	3.13	139
Marty O'Toole	5	38.0	3	2	2.37	34

==== Other pitchers ====
Note: G = Games pitched; IP = Innings pitched; W = Wins; L = Losses; ERA = Earned run average; SO = Strikeouts

Player	G	IP	W	L	ERA	SO
Elmer Steele	31	166.0	9	9	2.60	52
Claude Hendrix	22	118.2	4	6	2.73	57
Jack Ferry	26	85.2	6	4	3.15	32
Harry Gardner	13	42.0	1	1	4.50	24
Judge Nagle	8	27.1	4	2	3.62	11
Kirby White	2	3.0	0	1	9.00	1

==== Relief pitchers ====
Note: G = Games pitched; W = Wins; L = Losses; SV = Saves; ERA = Earned run average; SO = Strikeouts

Player	G	W	L	SV	ERA	SO
Hank Robinson	5	0	1	0	2.77	8
Deacon Phillippe	3	0	0	0	7.50	3
Ensign Cottrell	1	0	0	0	9.00	0
Sherry Smith	1	0	0	0	54.00	0
