= Schardt =

Schardt is a surname of European origin. Notable persons with the surname include:

- Arlie Schardt (1895–1980), American athlete
- Hans Schardt (1858–1931), Swiss geologist
- Johan Gregor van der Schardt (c. 1530/31–1581), sculptor
- Sophie von Schardt(1755–1819), Weimar poet
- Susan Schardt (1872–1934), Austrian philanthropist
- Wilburt Schardt (1886–1964), American baseball player
