= 1911 Cincinnati Reds season =

1911 Cincinnati Reds
- League: National League
- Ballpark: Palace of the Fans
- City: Cincinnati, Ohio
- Owners: Garry Herrmann
- Managers: Clark Griffith

The 1911 Cincinnati Reds season was a season in American baseball. The team finished sixth in the National League with a record of 70–83, 29 games behind the New York Giants.

== Offseason ==
The Reds were involved in an eight player trade with the Philadelphia Phillies on November 12, as Cincinnati traded away pitchers Fred Beebe and Jack Rowan, third baseman Hans Lobert, and outfielder Dode Paskert to Philadelphia, and received outfielder Johnny Bates, third baseman Eddie Grant, and pitchers George McQuillan and Lew Moren.

Bates batted .305 with three home runs and 61 RBI in 135 games for the Phillies in 1910, while Grant hit .268 with one home run and 67 RBI in 152 games. Grant led the National League in at bats in both 1908 and 1909. McQullan missed some time in 1910 due to injuries, however, he had a 9-6 record with a 1.60 ERA in 24 games. In 1908, McQuillan posted a 23-17 record with a 1.53 ERA in 48 games, pitching 359.2 innings, and throwing 32 complete games. Moren was 13-14 with a 3.55 ERA in 34 games with the Phillies in 1910.

On February 6, the Reds purchased outfielder Fred Beck from the Boston Rustlers. Beck hit .275 with a league leading 10 home runs and had 64 RBI in 154 games in 1910.

== Regular season ==
The Reds continued to make moves in the regular season, acquiring Frank Smith from the Boston Red Sox for $5000 on May 11. Smith, who split the 1910 season with the Red Sox and the Chicago White Sox and dealt with injuries, had a poor start with Boston in 1911. He had a great 1909 season with the White Sox, going 25-17 with a 1.80 ERA, and led the American League with 51 games pitched, 40 starts, 37 complete games, 365 innings pitched and struck out 177 batters.

Midway through the season, in June, the Reds purchased outfielder Armando Marsans from New Britain Perfectos of the Connecticut State League for $6000. Shortly after, on July 9, Cincinnati traded away outfielder Fred Beck to the Philadelphia Phillies for pitcher Bert Humphries. Beck struggled in his time with Cincinnati, batting only .184 with two home runs and 20 RBI in 41 games.

Offensively, the club was led by first baseman Dick Hoblitzell, who hit .289 with 11 home runs and 91 RBI in 158 games. Outfielder Bob Bescher led the National League with 81 stolen bases, and hit .275 with one home run, 45 RBI, had 102 walks, and scored a team high 106 runs. Newly acquired Johnny Bates hit a team high .292 with one home run, 61 RBI, 33 stolen bases in his first season with the club. Mike Mitchell had another solid season, batting .291 with two home runs and 84 RBI.

George Suggs led the pitching staff, as he had a 15-13 record and a 3.00 ERA in 36 games, leading Cincinnati with 260.2 innings pitched and 17 complete games. Art Fromme had a 10-12 record with a 3.46 ERA, and led the Reds by striking out 107 batters.

=== Season summary ===
After making some trades over the off-season, the Reds entered the 1911 season with a goal of winning the National League pennant. The club began the season with a poor 3-6 record in their first nine games, before winning eight of their next ten, to improve to 11-8, however, Cincinnati was in fourth place, five games behind the first place Philadelphia Phillies. With a four-game series against the Phillies, the Reds ended up losing three of the game, including a 21-5 blowout loss, to drop further behind them in the race for the pennant.

The Reds continued to struggle, and were 10 games under .500 in early July. The team limped their way through the 1911 season, finishing with a 70-83 record, and in sixth place in the National League, 29 games behind the New York Giants. It was the worst season by Cincinnati since a 66-87 record in 1907.

At the end of the season, the Reds replaced manager Clark Griffith.

=== Season standings ===
National League
Team	W	L	Pct.	GB	Home	Road
New York Giants	99	54	.647	—	49‍–‍25	50‍–‍29
Chicago Cubs	92	62	.597	7½	49‍–‍32	43‍–‍30
Pittsburgh Pirates	85	69	.552	14½	48‍–‍29	37‍–‍40
Philadelphia Phillies	79	73	.520	19½	42‍–‍34	37‍–‍39
St. Louis Cardinals	75	74	.503	22	36‍–‍38	39‍–‍36
Cincinnati Reds	70	83	.458	29	38‍–‍42	32‍–‍41
Brooklyn Trolley Dodgers	64	86	.427	33½	31‍–‍42	33‍–‍44
Boston Rustlers	44	107	.291	54	19‍–‍54	25‍–‍53

=== Record vs. opponents ===
1911 National League record Sources:
Team	BSN	BRO	CHC	CIN	NYG	PHI	PIT	STL
Boston	—	12–10–1	5–17	4–17–1	7–15	6–16	3–19	7–13–3
Brooklyn	10–12–1	—	13–9	11–11	5–16–1	8–13–1	14–8	9–11–1
Chicago	17–5	9–13	—	14–8–1	11–11	15–7	10–12	16–6–2
Cincinnati	17–4–1	11–11	8–14–1	—	8–14	10–12	10–12–1	6–16–3
New York	15–7	16–5–1	11–11	14–8	—	12–10	16–6	15–7
Philadelphia	16–6	13–8–1	7–15	12–10	10–12	—	13–9	8–13
Pittsburgh	19–3	14–8	12–10	12–10–1	6–16	9–13	—	13–9
St. Louis	13–7–3	11–9–1	6–16–2	16–6–3	7–15	13–8	9–13	—

=== Roster ===
1911 Cincinnati Reds
Roster
Pitchers: Rube Benton; Ray Boyd; Bill Burns; Jack Compton; Art Fromme; Harry Gaspar; Bert Humphries; Herb Juul; Bobby Keefe; George McQuillan; Barney Schreiber; Frank Smith; George Suggs; Jesse Tannehill	Catchers: Tommy Clarke; Larry McLean; Hank Severeid; Infielders: Rafael Almeida; Dave Altizer; Mike Balenti; Tom Downey; Dick Egan; Jimmy Esmond; Eddie Grant; Dick Hoblitzel	Outfielders: Johnny Bates; Fred Beck; Bob Bescher; Armando Marsans; Mike Mitchell; Other batters: Danny Mahoney; Hub Northen	Manager: Clark Griffith

== Player stats ==
=== Batting ===
==== Starters by position ====
Note: Pos = Position; G = Games played; AB = At bats; H = Hits; Avg. = Batting average; HR = Home runs; RBI = Runs batted in

Pos	Player	G	AB	H	Avg.	HR	RBI
C	Larry McLean	107	328	94	.287	0	34
1B	Dick Hoblitzell	158	622	180	.289	11	91
2B	Dick Egan	153	558	139	.249	1	56
SS	Tom Downey	111	360	94	.261	0	36
3B	Eddie Grant	136	458	102	.223	1	53
OF	Johnny Bates	148	518	151	.292	1	61
OF	Bob Bescher	153	599	165	.275	1	45
OF	Mike Mitchell	142	529	154	.291	2	84

==== Other batters ====
Note: G = Games played; AB = At bats; H = Hits; Avg. = Batting average; HR = Home runs; RBI = Runs batted in

Player	G	AB	H	Avg.	HR	RBI
Tommy Clarke	86	203	49	.241	1	25
Jimmy Esmond	73	198	54	.273	1	11
Armando Marsans	58	138	36	.261	0	11
Rafael Almeida	36	96	30	.313	0	15
Fred Beck	41	87	16	.184	2	20
Dave Altizer	37	75	17	.227	0	4
Hank Severeid	37	56	17	.304	0	10
Mike Balenti	8	8	2	.250	0	0
Hub Northen	1	0	0	----	0	0
Danny Mahoney	1	0	0	----	0	0

=== Pitching ===
==== Starting pitchers ====
Note: G = Games pitched; IP = Innings pitched; W = Wins; L = Losses; ERA = Earned run average; SO = Strikeouts

Player	G	IP	W	L	ERA	SO
George Suggs	36	260.2	15	13	3.00	91
Harry Gaspar	44	253.2	11	17	3.30	76
Bobby Keefe	39	234.1	12	13	2.69	105
Art Fromme	38	208.0	10	11	3.46	107
Rube Benton	6	44.2	3	3	2.01	28

==== Other pitchers ====
Note: G = Games pitched; IP = Innings pitched; W = Wins; L = Losses; ERA = Earned run average; SO = Strikeouts

Player	G	IP	W	L	ERA	SO
Frank Smith	34	176.1	10	14	3.98	67
George McQuillan	19	77.0	2	6	4.68	28
Bert Humphries	14	65.0	4	3	2.35	16
Ray Boyd	7	44.0	2	2	2.66	20
Jack Compton	8	25.1	0	1	3.91	6
Bill Burns	6	17.2	1	0	3.06	5

==== Relief pitchers ====
Note: G = Games pitched; W = Wins; L = Losses; SV = Saves; ERA = Earned run average; SO = Strikeouts

Player	G	W	L	SV	ERA	SO
Barney Schreiber	3	0	0	1	5.40	5
Jesse Tannehill	1	0	0	0	6.23	1
Herb Juul	1	0	0	0	4.50	2
