= Troy Puckett =

American baseball player

- Pitcher
- Born: December 10, 1889; Winchester, Indiana
- Died: April 13, 1971 (aged 81); Winchester, Indiana
- Batted: Left Threw: Right

MLB debut
- October 4, 1911, for the Philadelphia Phillies

Last MLB appearance
- October 4, 1911, for the Philadelphia Phillies

MLB statistics
- Win–loss record: 0-0
- Earned run average: 13.50
- Strikeouts: 1

Teams
- Philadelphia Phillies (1911)

Troy Levi Puckett (December 10, 1889 – April 13, 1971) was a Major League Baseball pitcher. He pitched two innings in one game for the 1911 Philadelphia Phillies on October 4. He attended Wabash College and later pitched in eight games for the Cairo Egyptians of the Kentucky–Illinois–Tennessee League during 1912.
