= Phil Redding =

American baseball player (1890–1929)

- Pitcher
- Born: January 25, 1890; Crystal Springs, Mississippi, U.S.
- Died: March 30, 1929 (aged 39); Greenwood, Mississippi, U.S.
- Batted: Left Threw: Right

MLB debut
- September 14, 1912, for the St. Louis Cardinals

Last MLB appearance
- April 24, 1913, for the St. Louis Cardinals

MLB statistics
- Win–loss record: 2–1
- Earned run average: 5.14
- Strikeouts: 10
- Stats at Baseball Reference

Teams
- St. Louis Cardinals (1912–1913)

Philip Hayden Redding (January 25, 1890 – March 30, 1929) was an American Major League Baseball pitcher who made three starts in 1912 and one relief appearance in 1913 for the St. Louis Cardinals.

Redding continued to pitch in the minor leagues, with trials as high as A ball, but mostly in classes C and D, winning 23 games in his final season of 1916.
