= Dick Cotter (baseball) =

American baseball player (1889–1945)

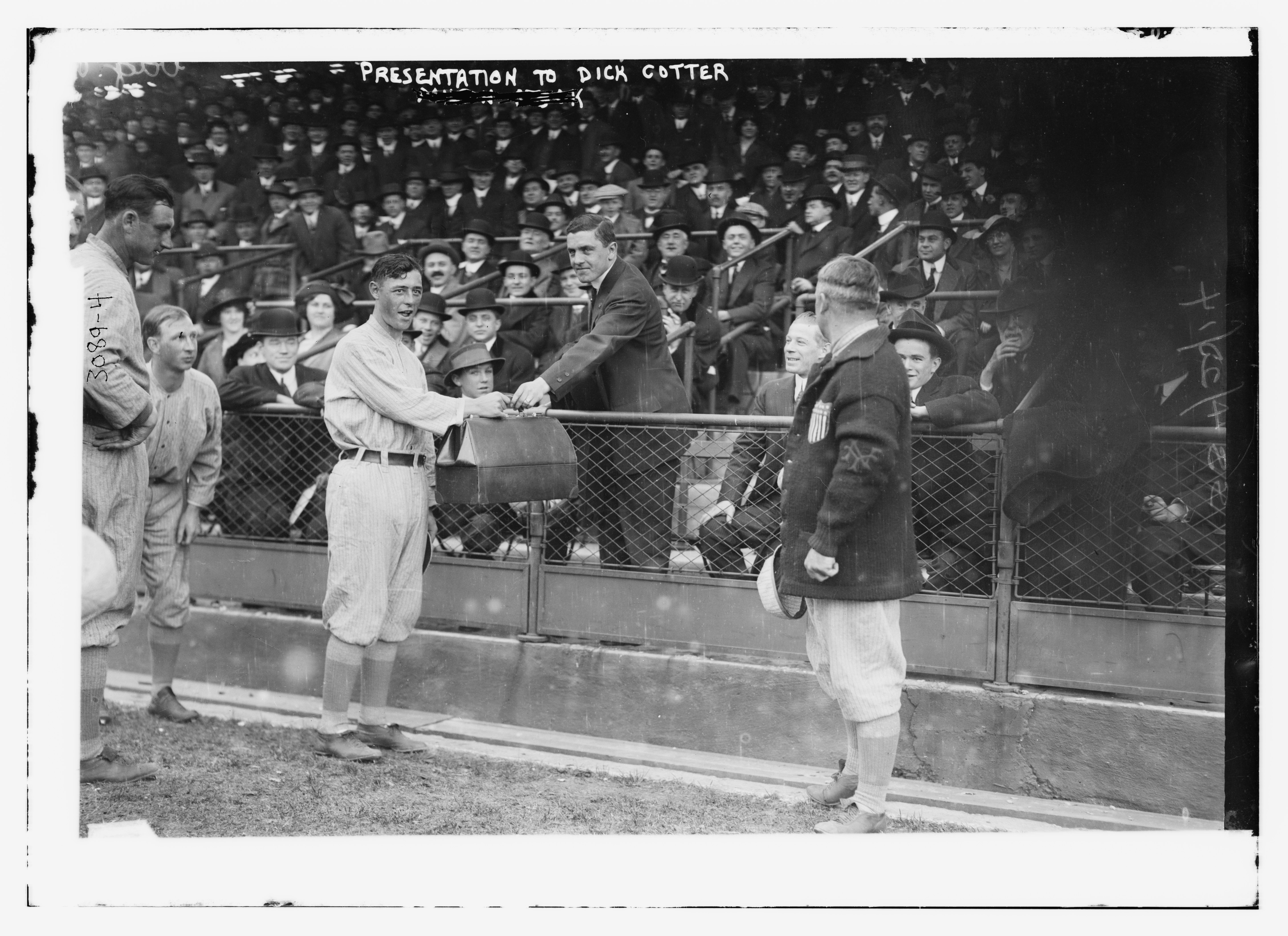
- Catcher
- Born: October 12, 1889; Manchester, New Hampshire, U.S.
- Died: April 4, 1945 (aged 55); Brooklyn, New York, U.S.
- Batted: Right Threw: Right

MLB debut
- August 17, 1911, for the Philadelphia Phillies

Last MLB appearance
- September 26, 1912, for the Chicago Cubs

MLB statistics
- Games played: 46
- At bats: 100
- Hits: 28
- Stats at Baseball Reference

Teams
- Philadelphia Phillies (1911); Chicago Cubs (1912)

Richard Raphael Cotter (October 12, 1889 – April 4, 1945) was an American professional baseball catcher. After playing at Manhattan College he played 20 games for the 1911 Philadelphia Phillies and another 20 for the 1912 Chicago Cubs. He later played in the American Association in 1913, the International League from 1920 to 1921 and the New York-Pennsylvania League in 1923 and 1924.
