= Jerry Dorsey (outfielder) =

American baseball player (1885–1924)

- Outfielder
- Born: Jeremiah Joseph d'Arcy; December 4, 1885; Oakland, California, U.S.
- Died: July 1, 1924 (aged 38); Eastland, Texas, U.S.
- Batted: Left Threw: Left

MLB debut
- September 23, 1911, for the Pittsburgh Pirates

Last MLB appearance
- September 28, 1911, for the Pittsburgh Pirates

MLB statistics
- Batting average: .000 (0-for-6)
- Games played: 2
- Stats at Baseball Reference

Teams
- Pittsburgh Pirates (1911)

Jeremiah Joseph d'Arcy (December 4, 1885 – July 1, 1924), also known as Jerry Dorsey, was an American professional baseball outfielder. He played in two games for the 1911 Pittsburgh Pirates, without recording a hit in six at-bats.
