= Huck Wallace =

American baseball player (1882–1951)

- Pitcher
- Born: July 27, 1882; Richmond, Indiana, U.S.
- Died: July 9, 1951 (aged 68); Cleveland, Ohio, U.S.
- Batted: Left Threw: Left

MLB debut
- June 5, 1912, for the Philadelphia Phillies

Last MLB appearance
- July 1, 1912, for the Philadelphia Phillies

MLB statistics
- Win–loss record: 0–0
- Earned run average: 0.00
- Strikeouts: 4
- Stats at Baseball Reference

Teams
- Philadelphia Phillies (1912)

Harry Clinton "Huck" Wallace (July 27, 1882 – July 9, 1951), nicknamed "Lefty", was an American pitcher in Major League Baseball. He played for the Philadelphia Phillies in 1912. In four career games, he allowed seven hits in 4.2 innings. He had an ERA of 0.00 while allowing 5 runs, all unearned. Wallace threw left and batted left. He was born in Richmond, Indiana, in 1882 and died in Cleveland, Ohio, in 1951. Along with the nickname "Huck", Wallace was also nicknamed "Lefty", because he was left-handed.
