= Mike Loan =

American baseball player (1894-1966)

- Catcher
- Born: September 27, 1894; Philadelphia, Pennsylvania, U.S.
- Died: November 12, 1966 (aged 72); Springfield, Pennsylvania, U.S.
- Batted: Right Threw: Right

MLB debut
- September 18, 1912, for the Philadelphia Phillies

Last MLB appearance
- September 18, 1912, for the Philadelphia Phillies

MLB statistics
- Batting average: .500
- Hits: 1
- Runs scored: 1
- Stats at Baseball Reference

Teams
- Philadelphia Phillies (1912)

William Joseph "Mike" Loan (September 27, 1894 – November 12, 1966) was an American Major League Baseball player for the Philadelphia Phillies. He was officially listed as standing 5 feet 11 inches (180 cm) and weighing 185 pounds (84 kg).

== Early life ==
Mike Loan was born in Philadelphia, Pennsylvania, on September 27, 1894. He was a student-athlete at Villanova University, 1 of 49 from the school to play in Major League Baseball.

== Baseball career ==
Loan got a "cup of coffee" with the Philadelphia Phillies in September 1912, appearing in a single game. He was the National League's second-youngest player that season, behind Frank O'Rourke of the Boston Braves. He was one of six players to appear at catcher for the Phillies in 1912, posting a 1.000 fielding percentage behind the plate. Appearing in the majors for the only time at age 17, he played against the St. Louis Cardinals, recording one hit, a single, in two at-bats, for a career batting average of .500. He also scored a run in his only game.

Loan later appeared in the minors, a member of the Eastern League's Bridgeport Americans. In 1919, he batted .149 with 11 hits in 74 at-bats over 28 games. Two of his hits went for extra bases: one double and one triple. He slugged .189 and collected 14 total bases. In the field, he had the Americans' second-most appearances at catcher (Bill Skiff) and made 84 putouts, 24 assists and 1 error, amassing a .991 fielding percentage.

== After baseball ==
Loan died on November 12, 1966, in Springfield, Pennsylvania, at the age of 72. He was interred at Saints Peter & Paul Cemetery in Springfield.
