= Roland Howell =

American baseball player (1892–1973)

- Pitcher
- Born: January 3, 1892; Napoleonville, Louisiana
- Died: March 31, 1973 (aged 81); Baton Rouge, Louisiana
- Batted: Right Threw: Right

MLB debut
- June 14, 1912, for the St. Louis Cardinals

Last MLB appearance
- June 25, 1912, for the St. Louis Cardinals

MLB statistics
- Win–loss record: 0–0
- Earned run average: 27.00
- Strikeouts: 0
- Stats at Baseball Reference

Teams
- St. Louis Cardinals (1912)

Roland Boatner Howell (January 3, 1892 – March 31, 1973) was a pitcher in Major League Baseball. He played for the St. Louis Cardinals in 1912.
