= George Mangus =

American baseball player (1890-1933)

- Left fielder
- Born: March 22, 1890; Red Creek, New York, U.S.
- Died: August 10, 1933 (aged 43); Rutland, Massachusetts, U.S.
- Batted: Left Threw: Right

MLB debut
- August 20, 1912, for the Philadelphia Phillies

Last MLB appearance
- September 20, 1912, for the Philadelphia Phillies

MLB statistics
- Batting average: .200
- Home runs: 0
- Runs batted in: 3
- Stats at Baseball Reference

Teams
- Philadelphia Phillies (1912)

George Graham Mangus (May 22, 1890 – August 10, 1933) was an American Major League Baseball left fielder who played in ten games for the Philadelphia Phillies late in the 1912 season.
