= Ray Rolling =

American baseball player (1886–1966)

- Second baseman
- Born: September 8, 1886; Martinsburg, Missouri, U.S.
- Died: August 25, 1966 (aged 79); St. Paul, Minnesota, U.S.
- Batted: Right Threw: Right

MLB debut
- September 6, 1900, for the St. Louis Cardinals

Last MLB appearance
- September 26, 1912, for the St. Louis Cardinals

MLB statistics
- Games played: 5
- At bats: 15
- Hits: 3
- Stats at Baseball Reference

Teams
- St. Louis Cardinals (1912)

Raymond Copeland Rolling (September 8, 1886 – August 25, 1966) was an American second baseman in Major League Baseball. He played for the St. Louis Cardinals in 1912.
