= Jim Galloway (baseball) =

American baseball player (1887–1950)

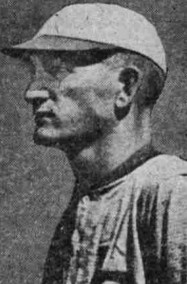
- Second baseman
- Born: September 16, 1887; Iredell, Texas, U.S.
- Died: May 3, 1950 (aged 62); Fort Worth, Texas, U.S.
- Batted: Both Threw: Right

MLB debut
- August 24, 1912, for the St. Louis Cardinals

Last MLB appearance
- October 1, 1912, for the St. Louis Cardinals

MLB statistics
- Batting average: .185
- Home runs: 0
- RBI: 4
- Stats at Baseball Reference

Teams
- St. Louis Cardinals (1912)

James Cato "Bad News" Galloway (September 16, 1887 – May 3, 1950) was an American Major League Baseball (MLB) second baseman who played for the St. Louis Cardinals in 1912.

Galloway began his professional career in 1910 and played until 1917. He served in World War I, then returned to professional baseball in 1920, playing until 1929, when he was 41 years old.

He made his major league debut on August 24, 1912 and played his final game on October 1 of that year. In 21 games, the 24-year-old hit .185 with no home runs, four RBI, two doubles and two stolen bases in 54 at-bats.

In the minor leagues, he played in 2,117 games and hit around .298 with at least 2,265 hits and 159 home runs. He hit over .300 nine times, with a career high of .347 (which he accomplished twice). He managed in the minor leagues for a decade and umpired in the Texas League for three years.
