= Gene Steinbrenner =

American baseball player (1892-1970)

- Second baseman
- Born: November 17, 1892; Pittsburgh, Pennsylvania, U.S.
- Died: April 25, 1970 (aged 77); Pittsburgh, Pennsylvania, U.S.
- Batted: Right Threw: Right

MLB debut
- April 25, 1912, for the Philadelphia Phillies

Last MLB appearance
- May 11, 1912, for the Philadelphia Phillies

MLB statistics
- Games played: 3
- At bats: 9
- Hits: 2
- Stats at Baseball Reference

Teams
- Philadelphia Phillies (1912)

Eugene Gass Steinbrenner (November 17, 1892 – April 25, 1970) was an American professional baseball second baseman, who played in Major League Baseball (MLB) for the Philadelphia Phillies in the 1912 season. In 3 career games, he had two hits in 9 at-bats.

Steinbrenner was born in 1892 and died in Pittsburgh, Pennsylvania in 1970. Steinbrenner is buried at Union Dale Cemetery, Pittsburgh.
