= Walt Miller (baseball) =

American baseball player

- Pitcher
- Born: October 19, 1883; Spiceland, Indiana, U.S.
- Died: March 1, 1956 (aged 72); Marion, Indiana, U.S.
- Batted: Right Threw: Right

MLB debut
- September 20, 1911, for the Brooklyn Dodgers

Last MLB appearance
- October 6, 1911, for the Brooklyn Dodgers

MLB statistics
- Win–loss record: 0-1
- Earned run average: 6.55
- Strikeouts: 0
- Stats at Baseball Reference

Teams
- Brooklyn Dodgers (1911)

Walter W. Miller (October 19, 1883 – March 1, 1956) was an American pitcher in Major League Baseball. He pitched for the Brooklyn Dodgers in three games during the 1911 baseball season.
