= Paddy Mayes =

American baseball player (1885–1963)

- Outfielder
- Born: March 17, 1885; Locust Grove, Oklahoma, U.S.
- Died: May 28, 1963 (aged 78); Fayetteville, Arkansas, U.S.
- Batted: Left Threw: Right

MLB debut
- June 11, 1911, for the Philadelphia Phillies

Last MLB appearance
- June 18, 1911, for the Philadelphia Phillies

MLB statistics
- Games played: 5
- At bats: 5
- Hits: 0
- Stats at Baseball Reference

Teams
- Philadelphia Phillies (1911)

Adair Bushyhead "Paddy" Mayes (March 17, 1885 – May 28, 1963) was an American Major League Baseball player. In the 5 games he played for the 1911 Philadelphia Phillies he amassed 5 at-bats, going 0 for 5 with a walk. Mayes played as an outfielder.

He was born in Locust Grove, Oklahoma and died in Fayetteville, Arkansas.
