= Elmer Miller (outfielder) =

American baseball player (1890–1944)

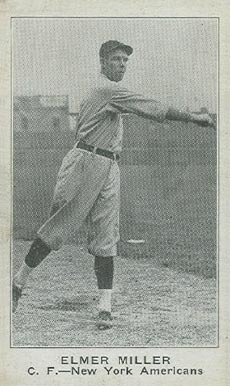
- Outfielder
- Born: July 28, 1890; Sandusky, Ohio, U.S.
- Died: November 28, 1944 (aged 54); Beloit, Wisconsin, U.S.
- Batted: Right Threw: Right

MLB debut
- April 26, 1912, for the St. Louis Cardinals

Last MLB appearance
- September 30, 1922, for the Brooklyn Robins

MLB statistics
- Batting average: .243
- Home runs: 16
- Runs batted in: 154
- Stats at Baseball Reference

Teams
- St. Louis Cardinals (1912); New York Yankees (1915–1922); Boston Red Sox (1922)

Elmer Miller (July 28, 1890 – November 28, 1944) is an American former professional baseball player in Major League Baseball. He played for the St. Louis Cardinals, New York Yankees, and Boston Red Sox. In his career, he posted a .243 batting average (343-for-1414) with 16 home runs and 154 RBI.

Miller left baseball in 1942 to join the Fairbanks-Morse manufacturing concern. Miller died at his home in Beloit, Wisconsin of a heart attack on November 28, 1944. He was 56 years old.
