= Dan Griner =

American baseball player (1888–1950)

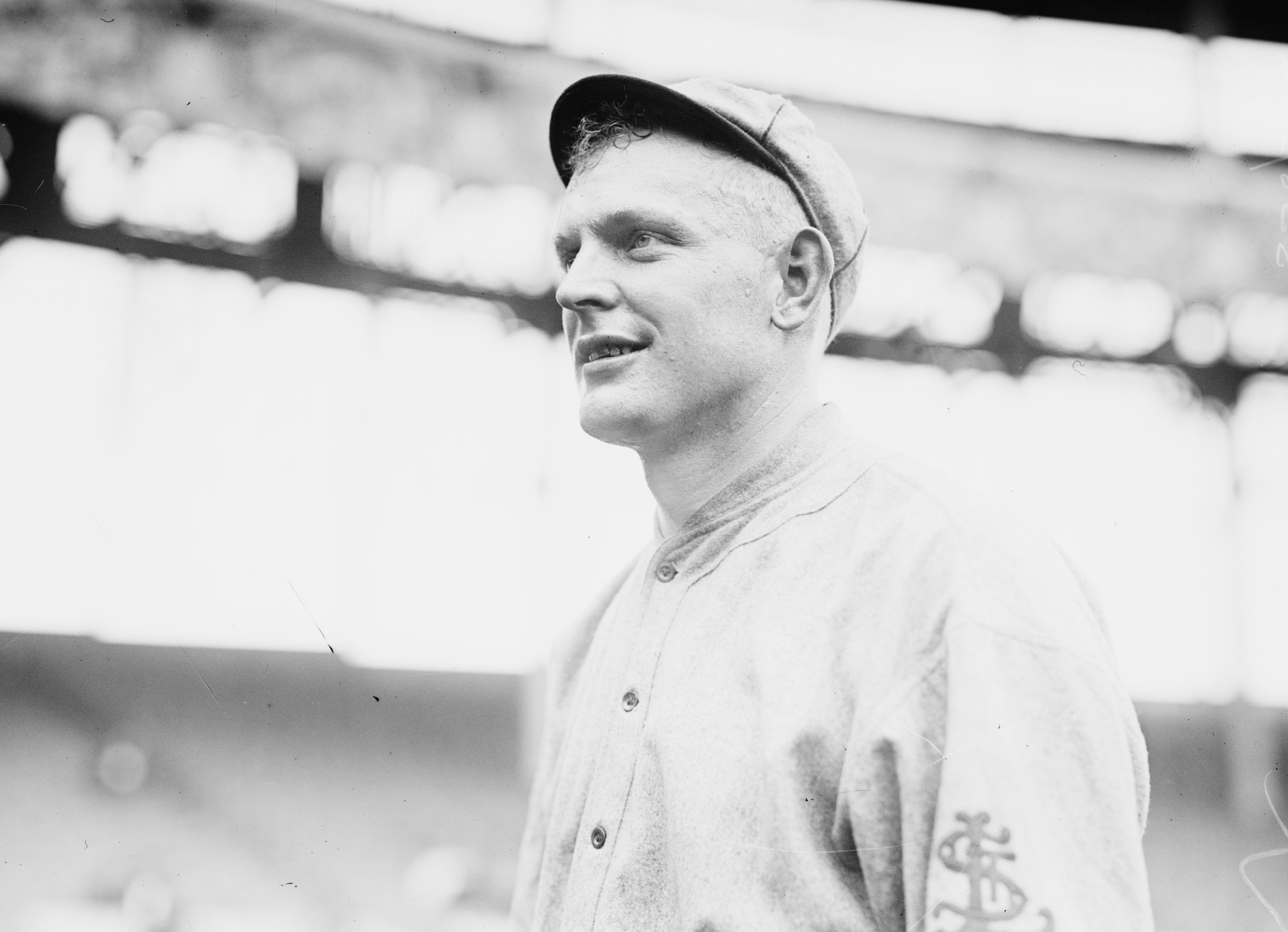
- Pitcher
- Born: March 7, 1888; Centerville, Tennessee, U.S.
- Died: June 3, 1950 (aged 62); Bishopville, South Carolina, U.S.
- Batted: Left Threw: Right

MLB debut
- August 17, 1912, for the St. Louis Cardinals

Last MLB appearance
- June 8, 1918, for the Brooklyn Robins

MLB statistics
- Win–loss record: 28–55
- Earned run average: 3.49
- Strikeouts: 244
- Stats at Baseball Reference

Teams
- St. Louis Cardinals (1912–1916); Brooklyn Robins (1918)

Donald Dexter Griner (March 7, 1888 – June 3, 1950) was an American pitcher in Major League Baseball. He pitched from 1912 to 1918.
