= John Dodge (baseball) =

American baseball player (1893–1916)

John Lewis Dodge
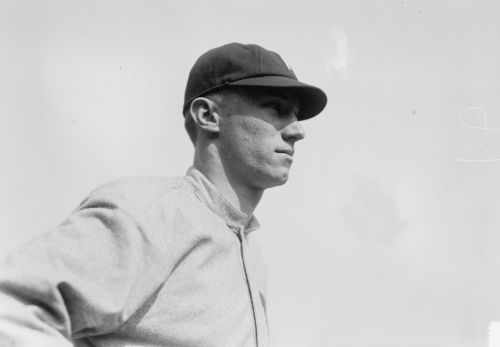
- Dodge playing for the Philadelphia Phillies in 1913
- Third base
- Born: April 27, 1893; Bolivar, Mississippi, U.S.
- Died: June 19, 1916 (aged 23); Mobile, Alabama, U.S.
- Batted: Right Threw: Right

debut
- August 29, 1912, for the Philadelphia Phillies

Last appearance
- October 5, 1913, for the Cincinnati Reds

MLB statistics
- Batting average: .215
- Hits: 90
- Runs: 38
- Home runs: 4
- Runs batted in: 48
- Stats at Baseball Reference

Teams
- Philadelphia Phillies (1912–1913); Cincinnati Reds (1913)

John Lewis Dodge (April 27, 1893 – June 19, 1916) was an American third baseman in Major League Baseball from 1912 until 1913. He made his debut on August 29, 1912, for the Philadelphia Phillies. He was traded to the Cincinnati Reds on June 3, 1913, and played his last game for the Reds on October 5 of that year. He died in Mobile, Alabama after being hit in the face by a pitch in a minor league baseball game.

== Fielding and defense ==
Dodge was a third baseman, but also played shortstop and second base early in his career as a Philadelphia Phillie. After he was traded to the Cincinnati Reds for Beals Becker, Dodge played all of his games at third base. In 1913, Dodge was third in errors committed by a third baseman in the National League.

== Death ==
In early 1914, Dodge was released from the Reds, and by 1916 was playing with the Mobile Sea Gulls of the Southern League. On June 18, 1916, Dodge was hit square in the face by an inside pitch from Nashville's Tom Rogers. According to The Sporting News, "at the time it was not thought Dodge was seriously injured. Examination by physicians, however, showed that his face was crushed in such a manner that complications might result and he was taken to a hospital, but nothing medical aid could do would save his life." Dodge died the following night, at the age of 23.

== See also ==
- List of baseball players who died during their careers
- Ray Chapman, who was killed by a pitched ball during a Major League game
