= John Quinn (catcher) =

American baseball player (1885-1956)

- Catcher
- Born: September 12, 1885; Framingham, Massachusetts, U.S.
- Died: April 9, 1956 (aged 70); Marlboro, Massachusetts, U.S.
- Batted: Right Threw: Right

MLB debut
- October 9, 1911, for the Philadelphia Phillies

Last MLB appearance
- October 6, 1911, for the Philadelphia Phillies

MLB statistics
- Games played: 1
- At bats: 2
- Hits: 0
- Stats at Baseball Reference

Teams
- Philadelphia Phillies (1911)

John Edward "Pick" Quinn (September 12, 1885 - April 9, 1956) was an American Major League Baseball player. Quinn played for the Philadelphia Phillies in 1911. He batted and threw right-handed. In 1935, he was the manager of the Johnstown Johnnies in the Middle Atlantic League.

He was born in Framingham, Massachusetts and died in Marlboro, Massachusetts.
