= John Kelleher =

American baseball player (1893–1960)

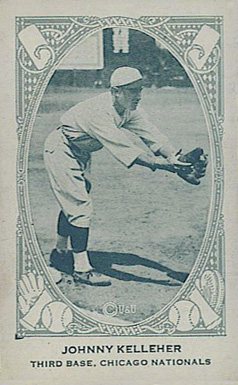
- Third Base, Chicago Nationals
- Third baseman
- Born: September 13, 1893; Brighton, Massachusetts, U.S.
- Died: August 21, 1960 (aged 66); Brookline, Massachusetts, U.S.
- Batted: Right Threw: Right

MLB debut
- July 31, 1912, for the St. Louis Cardinals

Last MLB appearance
- April 20, 1924, for the Boston Braves

MLB statistics
- Batting average: .293
- Home runs: 10
- Runs batted in: 89
- Stats at Baseball Reference

Teams
- St. Louis Cardinals (1912); Brooklyn Robins (1916); Chicago Cubs (1921–1923); Boston Braves (1924)

John Kelleher (September 13, 1893 – August 21, 1960) was an American backup infielder in Major League Baseball, playing mainly at third baseman for four teams between the 1912 and 1924 seasons. Listed at 5 ft 11 in (1.80 m), 150 lb., he batted and threw right-handed.

A native of Brookline, Massachusetts, Edwards was 18 years old when he entered the majors in 1912 with the St. Louis Cardinals, playing for them in part of that season before joining the Brooklyn Robins (1916), Chicago Cubs (1921–1923) and Boston Braves (1924). His most productive season came in 1921, when he hit .309 with 31 runs scored and 47 RBI in 95 games, all career-numbers. He enjoyed another good year in 1923, hitting .306 with a career-high six home runs.

In a six-season career, Kelleher was a .293 hitter (206-for-703) with 10 home runs and 89 RBI in 235 games, including 81 runs, 29 doubles, eight triples, and nine stolen bases. Following his playing career, he was an assistant baseball coach at Harvard University in 1925 and head coach at Brown University from 1930 to 1941.

Kelleher died in Brookline, Massachusetts, at the age of 66.
