= Vic Saier =

American baseball player (1891–1967)

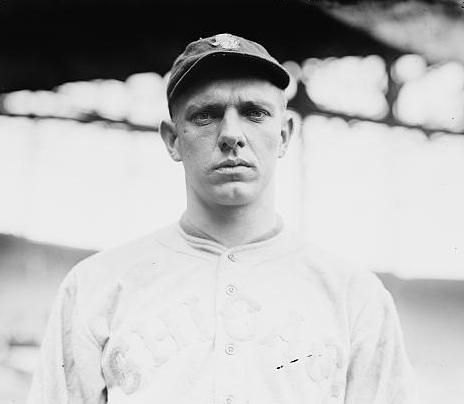
- Saier in 1914
- First baseman
- Born: May 4, 1891; Lansing, Michigan, U.S.
- Died: May 14, 1967 (aged 76); East Lansing, Michigan, U.S.
- Batted: Left Threw: Right

MLB debut
- May 3, 1911, for the Chicago Cubs

Last MLB appearance
- August 5, 1919, for the Pittsburgh Pirates

MLB statistics
- Batting average: .263
- Home runs: 55
- Runs batted in: 396
- Stats at Baseball Reference

Teams
- Chicago Cubs (1911–1917); Pittsburgh Pirates (1919)

Victor Sylvester Saier (May 4, 1891 – May 14, 1967) was an American first baseman in Major League Baseball from 1911 to 1919. He played for the Chicago Cubs and the Pittsburgh Pirates. Saier stood at 5 ft 11 in (1.80 m) and weighed 185 lbs.

== Career ==
Vic Saier was born in Lansing, Michigan, and attended St. Mary's High School. He started his professional baseball career in 1910. In his first season, with the Lansing Senators, he led the Southern Michigan League in hits, doubles, and total bases, and he was purchased by the Chicago Cubs for $1,500.

Saier joined the Cubs in 1911. During his rookie season, starting first baseman, manager, and future Hall of Famer Frank Chance got injured, and Saier replaced him. He batted .259 in 86 games. The next season, he raised his average to .288 in his first season as an MLB starter; in 1913, he hit his peak, setting career-highs in nearly every offensive category while leading the National League in triples, with 21.

In July 1915, Saier was leading the league in runs batted in when he suffered a leg injury that kept him out of the lineup for three weeks. He continued to put up decent numbers, but then he injured his leg again early in 1917 that sidelined him for almost the entire year. Saier was then purchased by the Pirates before 1919. After batting just .223 in 58 games that season, he was released.

In 865 games over eight seasons, Saier posted a .263 batting average (775-for-2948) with 455 runs, 143 doubles, 61 triples, 55 home runs, 396 RBIs, 121 stolen bases, 378 bases on balls, .351 on-base percentage and .409 slugging percentage. Defensively, he recorded a .986 fielding percentage playing every inning of his career at first base.

Saier was married and had two daughters and a son. He died in East Lansing, Michigan, at the age of 76.

== See also ==
- List of Major League Baseball annual triples leaders
