= Bill Keen =

American baseball player (1892–1947)

- First baseman
- Born: August 16, 1892; Oglethorpe, Georgia
- Died: July 16, 1947 (aged 54); South Point, Ohio
- Batted: Right Threw: Right

MLB debut
- August 8, 1911, for the Pittsburgh Pirates

Last MLB appearance
- October 9, 1911, for the Pittsburgh Pirates

MLB statistics
- Games played: 6
- At bats: 7
- Hits: 0
- Stats at Baseball Reference

Teams
- Pittsburgh Pirates (1911)

William Brown Keen (August 16, 1892 – July 16, 1947), nicknamed "Hammerhead", was a first baseman in Major League Baseball. He played for the Pittsburgh Pirates in 1911.
