= John Shovlin =

American baseball player (1891–1976)

- Second baseman
- Born: January 14, 1891; Drifton, Pennsylvania, U.S.
- Died: February 16, 1976 (aged 85); Bethesda, Maryland, U.S.
- Batted: Right Threw: Right

MLB debut
- June 21, 1911, for the Pittsburgh Pirates

Last MLB appearance
- May 12, 1920, for the St. Louis Browns

MLB statistics
- Batting average: .209
- Home runs: 0
- Runs batted in: 3
- Stats at Baseball Reference

Teams
- Pittsburgh Pirates (1911); St. Louis Browns (1919–1920)

John Joseph "Brode" Shovlin (January 14, 1891 – February 16, 1976) was an American second baseman in Major League Baseball. He played for the Pittsburgh Pirates and St. Louis Browns.
