= Len Madden =

American baseball player (1890–1949)

- Pitcher
- Born: July 2, 1890; Toledo, Ohio
- Died: September 9, 1949 (aged 59); Toledo, Ohio
- Batted: Left Threw: Left

MLB debut
- August 31, 1912, for the Chicago Cubs

Last MLB appearance
- September 19, 1912, for the Chicago Cubs

MLB statistics
- Win–loss record: 0–1
- Earned run average: 2.92
- Strikeouts: 5
- Stats at Baseball Reference

Teams
- Chicago Cubs (1912)

Leonard Joseph Madden (July 2, 1890 – September 9, 1949) was an American baseball player who played pitcher in the Major Leagues in 1912. He played for the Chicago Cubs.
