= Clarence Lehr =

American baseball player (1886–1948)

- Outfielder / Infielder
- Born: May 16, 1886; Escanaba, Michigan, U.S.
- Died: January 31, 1948 (aged 61); Highland Park, Michigan, U.S.
- Batted: Right Threw: Right

MLB debut
- May 18, 1911, for the Philadelphia Phillies

Last MLB appearance
- October 9, 1911, for the Philadelphia Phillies

MLB statistics
- Batting average: .148
- Home runs: 0
- Runs batted in: 2
- Stats at Baseball Reference

Teams
- Philadelphia Phillies (1911)

Clarence Emanuel Lehr (May 16, 1886 – January 31, 1948) nicknamed "King", was an American Major League Baseball outfielder and infielder who played for the Philadelphia Phillies in 1911. He was a board chairman of the Detroit Racing Association. He died after suffering a ruptured artery while working at his office in the Lafayette Building in Detroit.
