= Bert Hall (baseball) =

American baseball player (1889-1948)

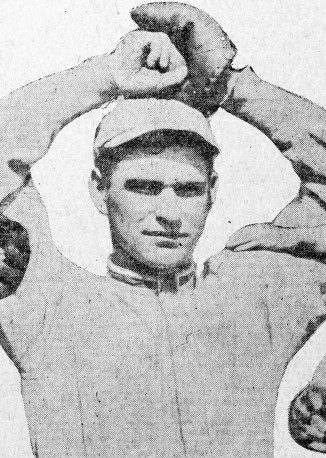
- Hall in 1915
- Pitcher
- Born: October 15, 1889; Portland, Oregon, U.S.
- Died: July 11, 1948 (aged 58); Seattle, Washington, U.S.
- Batted: Right Threw: Right

MLB debut
- August 21, 1911, for the Philadelphia Phillies

Last MLB appearance
- October 9, 1911, for the Philadelphia Phillies

MLB statistics
- Win–loss record: 0-1
- Earned run average: 4.00
- Strikeouts: 8
- Stats at Baseball Reference

Teams
- Philadelphia Phillies (1911)

Herbert Earl "Bert" Hall (October 15, 1889 – July 11, 1948) was an American Major League Baseball pitcher. He pitched for the Philadelphia Phillies in 1911, appearing in seven games with an 0-1 record and a 4.00 ERA.

Is thought to have thrown the first "Forkball" that is unique to the one we know today. Placing the ball between the pointer and middle finger and throwing with a normal release, however once released, acted without rotation, much like a knuckler. It is believed it looked a lot like former Major Leaguer Robert Coello's forkball. He hanged himself in his home on July 18, 1948.
