= Danny Mahoney =

American baseball player (1888–1960)

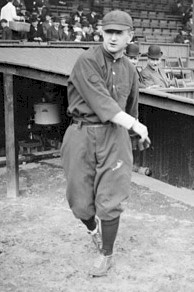
- Born: September 6, 1888; Haverhill, Massachusetts, U.S.
- Died: September 28, 1960 (aged 72); Utica, New York, U.S.
- Batted: Right Threw: Right

MLB debut
- May 15, 1911, for the Cincinnati Reds

Last MLB appearance
- May 15, 1911, for the Cincinnati Reds

MLB statistics
- Games played: 1
- Plate appearances: 0
- Hits: 0
- Stats at Baseball Reference

Teams
- Cincinnati Reds (1911)

Daniel Joseph Mahoney (September 6, 1888 – September 28, 1960) was an American Major League Baseball player who played for the Cincinnati Reds during the 1911 season. His only major league appearance came when he pinch ran in the 7th inning of a game played in Philadelphia on May 15, 1911.
