= John Mercer (baseball) =

American baseball player (1892–1982)

- First baseman
- Born: January 22, 1892; Taylortown, Louisiana
- Died: December 22, 1982 (aged 90); Shreveport, Louisiana
- Batted: Left Threw: Left

MLB debut
- June 25, 1912, for the St. Louis Cardinals

Last MLB appearance
- June 25, 1912, for the St. Louis Cardinals

MLB statistics
- Games played: 1
- At bats: 1
- Hits: 0
- Stats at Baseball Reference

Teams
- St. Louis Cardinals (1912)

John Locke Mercer (January 22, 1892 – December 22, 1982) was a Major League Baseball first baseman. Mercer played in one game for the St. Louis Cardinals on June 25, 1912.
