= Charley Moore =

American baseball player (1884–1970)

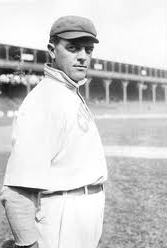
- Infielder
- Born: December 1, 1884; Jackson County, Indiana, U.S.
- Died: July 29, 1970 (aged 85); Portland, Oregon, U.S.
- Batted: Right Threw: Right

MLB debut
- April 16, 1912, for the Chicago Cubs

Last MLB appearance
- May 13, 1912, for the Chicago Cubs

MLB statistics
- Batting average: .222
- Home runs: 0
- Runs batted in: 2
- Stats at Baseball Reference

Teams
- Chicago Cubs (1912)

Charles Wesley Moore (December 1, 1884 – July 29, 1970) was an American professional baseball infielder who played briefly in Major League Baseball in 1912, appearing in five games for the Chicago Cubs. Moore played in the minor leagues during 1906–1915 and 1919; he later was a minor-league manager.
