= Barney Schreiber =

American baseball player (1882–1964)

- Pitcher
- Born: May 8, 1882; Waverly, Ohio, U.S.
- Died: October 6, 1964 (aged 82); Chillicothe, Ohio, U.S.
- Batted: Left Threw: Left

MLB debut
- May 15, 1911, for the Cincinnati Reds

Last MLB appearance
- June 4, 1911, for the Cincinnati Reds

MLB statistics
- Win–loss record: 0–0
- Strikeouts: 5
- Earned run average: 5.40
- Stats at Baseball Reference

Teams
- Cincinnati Reds (1911)

David Henry Schreiber (May 8, 1882 – October 6, 1964) was an American Major League Baseball pitcher. Schreiber played for the Cincinnati Reds in 1911. In 3 career games, he had a 0–0 record, with a 5.40 ERA. He batted and threw left-handed.

Schreiber was born in Waverly, Ohio and died in Chillicothe, Ohio.
