= Hank Ritter =

American baseball player (1893–1964)

- Pitcher
- Born: October 12, 1893; McCoysville, Pennsylvania, U.S.
- Died: September 3, 1964 (aged 70); Akron, Ohio, U.S.
- Batted: Right Threw: Right

MLB debut
- August 3, 1912, for the Philadelphia Phillies

Last MLB appearance
- September 27, 1916, for the New York Giants

MLB statistics
- Win–loss record: 4–1
- Strikeouts: 43
- Earned run average: 3.96
- Stats at Baseball Reference

Teams
- Philadelphia Phillies (1912); New York Giants (1914–1916)

William Herbert "Hank" Ritter (October 12, 1893 – September 3, 1964) was an American professional baseball pitcher. He played all or part of four seasons in Major League Baseball, between 1912 and 1916, for the Philadelphia Phillies and New York Giants.

== Sources ==
- Career statistics from Baseball Reference · Baseball Reference (Minors) · Retrosheet · Baseball Almanac
