= Sophie von Schardt =

Noblewoman in the Weimar court

- Born: Friederike Sophie Eleonore von Bernstorff; 23 November 1755; Hanover
- Died: 30 July 1819 (aged 63); Weimar
- Spouse: Ernst Karl Konstantin von Schardt (m. 1778)

Sophie von Schardt (born Sophie von Bernstorff: 23 November 1755 - 30 July 1819) was a well connected member of the Weimar court circle during the "classic" period. Mme de Staël thought her among the most sympathetic women in Weimar while Goethe himself, who enjoyed her company, referred to her as the "little Schardt" (als die "kleine Schardt"). She also wrote poems herself, which were mostly short lyric pieces, and produced translations from English and Italian (most of which remain unpublished).

== Biography ==
Friederike Sophie Eleonore von Bernstorff was born in Hanover. She had one sibling, her brother Hans Joachim Carl von Bernstorff (1754–1802). Andreas von Bernstorff (1688-1757), her father, was the vice-director of a law firm in Celle. He had been relatively old when he had married her mother, Charlotte von Holle (?-1763), and both parents died while the children were still small. Sophie was taken in to grow up with her cousins in the home of the international statesman Count Johann Hartwig Ernst von Bernstorff (1712–1772). Count von Bernstoff was a lover of literature, who is credited with having introduced the poet Friedrich Gottlieb Klopstock to the German literary scene. Count von Bernstoff had also married a woman far younger than himself, and after his death his widow, born Charitas Emilie von Buchwald (1733–1820), moved to Weimar with Sophie, who by now was in her early twenties.

On 28 April 1778 Sophie married the Weimar privy counsellor, Ernst Karl Konstantin von Schardt (1743–1833), a brother of Charlotte von Stein (1742-1827). The marriage was not a good one, spoiled, from Sophie's point of view, by the character defects of her husband, whose intellectual capacity fell far short of her own. She sought compensation for the lack of a satisfactory family life in a succession of close friendships with numerous men and women, some of whom were celebrities of the Weimar literary scene while others were individuals of little public note. True personal fulfillment came only with her flight to Catholicism. After several years of secretly drawing closer to the church, she completed the final necessary steps and converted at Easter 1816.

The better known members of Sophie von Schardt's Weimar network of friends included the lyric poet and Goethe intimate Karl Ludwig von Knebel.Another was the philosopher-poet Johann Gottfried Herder, who taught her Greek, and was particularly appreciative of her cheerful temperament which he valued as a corrective to his own tendency to melancholy. She developed a close relationship with the poet Zacharias Werner.

Sophie von Schardt was a prodigious letter writer. One confidant and friend with whom she conducted an extensive correspondence, especially around 1812, was the lawyer-poet Friedrich Leopold zu Stolberg-Stolberg. The correspondence details her careful preparation for her conversion to Catholicism. Stolberg-Stolberg understood the social and family-related complexities involved, having made precisely the same transition himself in 1800.

Sophie von Schardt died in Weimar.
