= Harry Gardner (baseball) =

American baseball player (1887–1961)

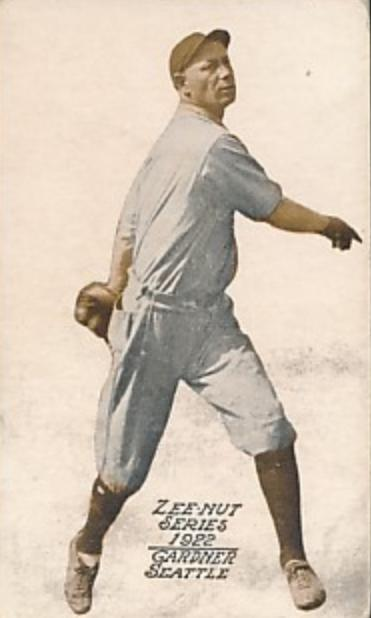
- Pitcher
- Born: June 1, 1887; Quincy, Michigan, U.S.
- Died: August 2, 1961 (aged 74); Barlow, Oregon, U.S.
- Batted: Right Threw: Right

MLB debut
- April 17, 1911, for the Pittsburgh Pirates

Last MLB appearance
- April 14, 1912, for the Pittsburgh Pirates

MLB statistics
- Win–loss record: 1–1
- Earned run average: 4.46
- Strikeouts: 24
- Stats at Baseball Reference

Teams
- Pittsburgh Pirates (1911–1912)

Harry Ray Gardner (June 1, 1887 – August 2, 1961) was an American pitcher in Major League Baseball. He played for the Pittsburgh Pirates.
