= Mike Hechinger =

American baseball player (1890–1967)

- Catcher
- Born: February 14, 1890; Chicago, Illinois, U.S
- Died: August 13, 1967 (aged 77); Chicago, Illinois, U.S.
- Batted: Right Threw: Right

MLB debut
- September 27, 1912, for the Chicago Cubs

Last MLB appearance
- September 8, 1913, for the Brooklyn Superbas

MLB statistics
- Batting average: .125
- Home runs: 0
- Runs batted in: 0
- Stats at Baseball Reference

Teams
- Chicago Cubs (1912–1913); Brooklyn Superbas (1913)

Michael Vincent Hechinger (February 14, 1890 – August 13, 1967) was an American professional baseball player who played catcher from 1912 to 1913.
