= Jack Boyle (third baseman) =

American baseball player (1889–1971)

- Third baseman
- Born: July 9, 1889; Morris, Illinois, U.S.
- Died: April 3, 1971 (aged 81); Fort Lauderdale, Florida, U.S.
- Batted: Left Threw: Right

MLB debut
- June 28, 1912, for the Philadelphia Phillies

Last MLB appearance
- October 5, 1912, for the Philadelphia Phillies

MLB statistics
- Batting average: .280
- Home runs: 0
- Runs batted in: 2

Teams
- Philadelphia Phillies (1912)

John Bellew Boyle (July 9, 1889 – April 3, 1971) was an American Major League Baseball third baseman. Boyle played for Philadelphia Phillies in 1912.

He is buried in Ogema, Wisconsin.
