= Frank Nicholson (baseball) =

American baseball player (1889-1972)

- Pitcher
- Born: August 29, 1889; Berlin, Pennsylvania, U.S.
- Died: November 10, 1972 (aged 83); Jersey Shore, Pennsylvania, U.S.
- Batted: Right Threw: Right

MLB debut
- September 6, 1912, for the Philadelphia Phillies

Last MLB appearance
- September 10, 1912, for the Philadelphia Phillies

MLB statistics
- Games pitched: 2
- Innings pitched: 4.0
- Earned run average: 6.75
- Stats at Baseball Reference

Teams
- Philadelphia Phillies (1912)

Frank Collins Nicholson (August 29, 1889 – November 10, 1972) was an American Major League Baseball pitcher who played for the Philadelphia Phillies in 1912. He pitched in two games, posting a 6.75 Earned run average.
