= Tex Erwin =

American baseball player (1885–1953)

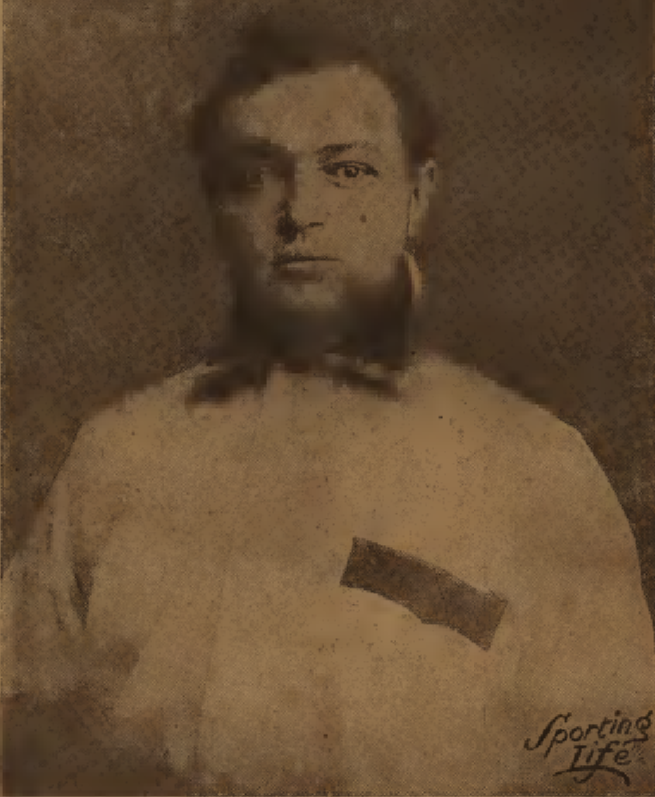
- Erwin from front page of Sporting Life, 11/30/1912.
- Catcher
- Born: December 22, 1885; Forney, Texas, U.S.
- Died: April 5, 1953 (aged 67); Rochester, New York, U.S.
- Batted: Left Threw: Right

MLB debut
- August 26, 1907, for the Detroit Tigers

Last MLB appearance
- July 23, 1914, for the Cincinnati Reds

MLB statistics
- Batting average: .236
- Home runs: 11
- Runs batted in: 70
- Stats at Baseball Reference

Teams
- Detroit Tigers (1907); Brooklyn Superbas/Dodgers/Robins (1910–1914); Cincinnati Reds (1914)

Ross Emil "Tex" Erwin (December 22, 1885 – April 5, 1953) was an American professional baseball player from 1905 to 1921. He played six years in Major League Baseball as a catcher for the Detroit Tigers (1908), Brooklyn Superbas (1910–14), and Cincinnati Reds (1914).

== Early years ==
Erwin was born in Forney, Texas, in 1885. He began his professional baseball career playing for the Fort Worth Panthers of the Texas League during the 1905 and 1906 seasons. He also played 11 games for the St. Paul Saints in the American Association during the 1906 season. In 1907, he played for the Topeka White Sox in the Western Association.

In late August 1907, Erwin made his major league debut with the Detroit Tigers. He appeared in only eight games for Detroit and did not appear in any of the Tigers' postseason games in the 1907 World Series.

After his brief stint with the Tigers, Erwin returned to the minor leagues, playing for the Rochester Bronchos of the Eastern League in 1908 and 1909.

== Brooklyn ==
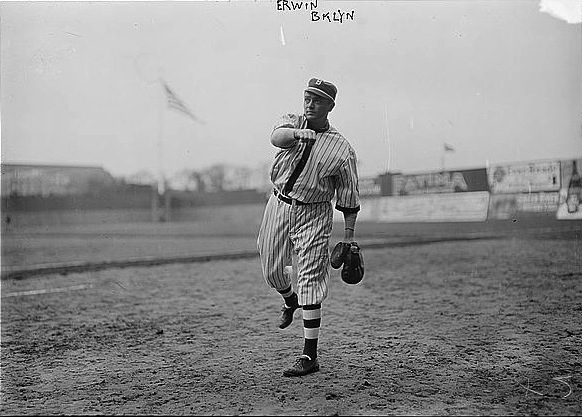
Erwin at Ebbetts Field, 1913

In August 1909, Erwin was purchased from Rochester by the Brooklyn Superbas of the National League. He played at the catcher position for Brooklyn from 1910 to 1914. In November 1912, the Sporting Life newspaper published a front-page photo profile of Erwin. The newspaper described him as "the rising young catcher of the Brooklyn National League." The profile indicated that Erwin was married and made his permanent home in Rochester, New York, though his family lived in Galveston, Texas.

In June 1913, Erwin suffered two fractures in his arm when Heinie Zimmerman of the Cubs slid into him at home plate. His playing time was limited thereafter. He appeared in only nine games for Brooklyn in 1914 before being released on waivers. The Sporting News later wrote that the collision with Zimmerman had "practically ended his career."

== Cincinnati and minor leagues ==
In July 1914, Erwin cleared waivers and was sent to Newark. Shortly thereafter, the Cincinnati Reds expressed interest in acquiring Erwin. Accordingly, he was reactivated by Brooklyn and thereupon sold to the Reds. He lasted less than three weeks in Cincinnati, appearing in only 12 games with his last major league game being on July 29, 1914.

After being released by Cincinnati, Erwin continued to play professional baseball until 1921, including stints with the Rochester Hustlers (1915, 1918) and Dallas Submarines (1921). Erwin also served as a minor league umpire during the 1916 and 1917 seasons.

== Career statistics ==
Erwin appeared in 276 major league games, compiling a .236 batting average and .326 on-base percentage with 150 hits, 82 bases on balls, 70 runs scored, 70 RBIs, 37 extra base hits, and 10 stolen bases.

== Later years ==
After retiring from baseball, Erwin lived in Rochester, New York, with his wife and children, Adelaide and Ross, Jr. He worked for a time as a salesman and, in 1927, went into the insurance business. He served on the Rochester City Council from 1937 to 1945. In his later years, Erwin suffered from arthritis. He was hospitalized in February 1953 after a severe attack of arthritis. He died in a Rochester hospital in April 1953 at age 67.
