= Eddie Dent =

American baseball player (1887-1974)

- Pitcher
- Born: December 8, 1887; Baltimore, Maryland, U.S.
- Died: November 25, 1974 (aged 86); Birmingham, Alabama, U.S.
- Batted: Right Threw: Right

MLB debut
- August 31, 1909, for the Brooklyn Superbas

Last MLB appearance
- April 11, 1912, for the Brooklyn Dodgers

MLB statistics
- Win–loss record: 4-5
- Earned run average: 4.46
- Strikeouts: 21
- Stats at Baseball Reference

Teams
- Brooklyn Superbas/Dodgers (1909, 1911–1912)

Elliott Estill Dent (December 8, 1887 in Baltimore, Maryland – November 25, 1974 in Birmingham, Alabama) was an American pitcher in Major League Baseball. He pitched from 1909 to 1912 for the Brooklyn Dodgers. He won a total of only four games as a major league pitcher -- but was the winning pitcher over all-time wins leader Cy Young in Young's very last major league game, on October 6, 1911.

Dent's son, Elliot, Jr., was awarded a Distinguished Service Cross for his aerial combat victories as part of the U. S. Air Force 7th Fighter Squadron of the 49th Fighter Group in World War II.
