= Elmer Steele =

American baseball player (1884–1966)

- Pitcher
- Born: May 17, 1884; Poughkeepsie, New York, U.S.
- Died: March 9, 1966 (aged 81); Rhinebeck, New York, U.S.
- Batted: Switch Threw: Right

MLB debut
- September 12, 1907, for the Boston Americans

Last MLB appearance
- October 9, 1911, for the Brooklyn Dodgers

MLB statistics
- Win–loss record: 18-24
- Earned run average: 2.41
- Strikeouts: 147
- Stats at Baseball Reference

Teams
- Boston Americans/Red Sox (1907–1909); Pittsburgh Pirates (1910–1911); Brooklyn Dodgers (1911)

Elmer Rae Steele (May 17, 1884 – March 9, 1966) was an American pitcher in Major League Baseball. He pitched in the major leagues from 1907 to 1911.

He also played for several years in the minor leagues. He began his professional career with the Poughkeepsie Colts of the Hudson River League in 1906. He played his last year with the Blue Ridge League in 1917.
