= Toots Shultz =

American baseball player

Toots Schultz
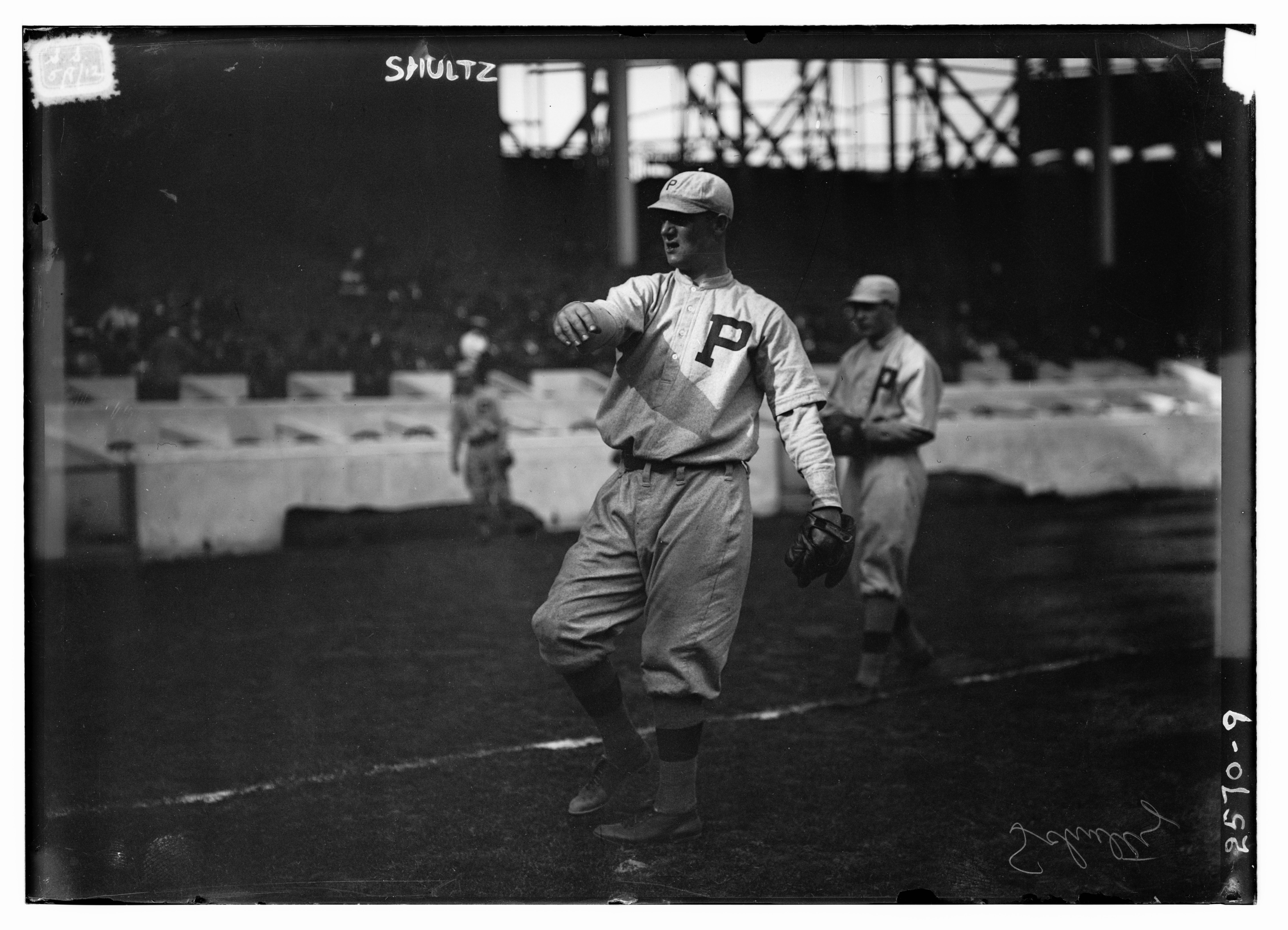
- Schultz in 1912
- Pitcher
- Born: October 10, 1888; Homestead, Pennsylvania, U.S.
- Died: January 30, 1959 (aged 70); McKeesport, Pennsylvania, U.S.
- Batted: Right Threw: Right

MLB debut
- May 5, 1911, for the Philadelphia Phillies

Last MLB appearance
- September 13, 1912, for the Philadelphia Phillies

MLB statistics
- Record: 1-7
- ERA: 6.00
- Strikeouts: 29
- Stats at Baseball Reference

Teams
- Philadelphia Phillies (1911–1912)

Wallace Luther "Toots" Shultz (October 10, 1888 – January 30, 1959) was an American Major League Baseball pitcher. Schultz played for the Philadelphia Phillies in 1911 and 1912.
