= Eddie Stack =

American baseball player (1887–1958)

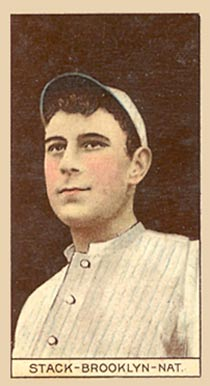
- Pitcher
- Born: October 24, 1887; Chicago, Illinois, U.S.
- Died: August 28, 1958 (aged 70); Chicago, Illinois, U.S.
- Batted: Right Threw: Right

MLB debut
- June 7, 1910, for the Philadelphia Phillies

Last MLB appearance
- August 3, 1914, for the Chicago Cubs

MLB statistics
- Win–loss record: 26–24
- Earned run average: 3.52
- Strikeouts: 200
- Stats at Baseball Reference

Teams
- Philadelphia Phillies (1910–1911); Brooklyn Dodgers (1912–1913); Chicago Cubs (1913–1914)

William Edward Stack (October 24, 1887 – August 28, 1958) was an American pitcher in Major League Baseball from 1910 to 1914.
