= Dolly Stark =

American baseball player (1885-1924)

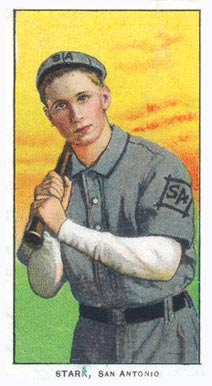
- Shortstop
- Born: January 19, 1885; Ripley, Mississippi, U.S.
- Died: December 1, 1924 (aged 39); Memphis, Tennessee, U.S.
- Batted: Right Threw: Right

MLB debut
- September 12, 1909, for the Cleveland Naps

Last MLB appearance
- May 24, 1912, for the Brooklyn Dodgers

MLB statistics
- Batting average: .238
- Home runs: 0
- Runs batted in: 30
- Stats at Baseball Reference

Teams
- Cleveland Naps (1909); Brooklyn Superbas/Dodgers (1910–1912)

Monroe Randolph Stark (January 19, 1885 – December 1, 1924) was an American college baseball coach and professional baseball player who coached the Mississippi A&M Aggies, now known as the Mississippi State Bulldogs to a 22–4 record in 1909. He then went on to play shortstop for the Cleveland Naps and Brooklyn Dodgers from 1909 to 1912.

Stark was killed by gunfire in Memphis, Tennessee and is buried at Elmwood Cemetery in Memphis. The man who shot him, Harry Atkinson, later pleaded guilty to manslaughter and was sentenced to five years in prison.

== Baseball coaching record ==
Record table
| Season | Team | Overall | Conference | Standing | Postseason |
|---|---|---|---|---|---|
Mississippi A&M (Southern Intercollegiate Athletic Association) (1909)
| 1909 | Mississippi A&M | 22–4 | 10–2 | 1st | NA |
| Mississippi A&M: | | 22-4 (.846) | 10-2 (.833) | | |
| Total: | | 22-4 (.846) | | | |
National champion Postseason invitational champion Conference regular season champion Conference regular season and conference tournament champion Division regular season champion Division regular season and conference tournament champion Conference tournament champion
