= Bob Higgins (baseball) =

American baseball player (1886-1941)

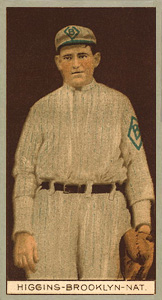
- Catcher
- Born: September 23, 1886; Fayetteville, Tennessee, U.S.
- Died: May 25, 1941 (aged 54); Chattanooga, Tennessee, U.S.
- Batted: Right Threw: Right

MLB debut
- September 13, 1909, for the Cleveland Naps

Last MLB appearance
- May 2, 1912, for the Brooklyn Dodgers

MLB statistics
- Batting average: .143
- Home runs: 0
- Runs batted in: 2
- Stats at Baseball Reference

Teams
- Cleveland Naps (1909); Brooklyn Dodgers (1911–1912)

Robert Stone Higgins (September 23, 1886 – May 25, 1941) was an American Major League Baseball catcher. He played in the majors between 1909 and 1912.
