= Bert Tooley =

American baseball player (1886-1976)

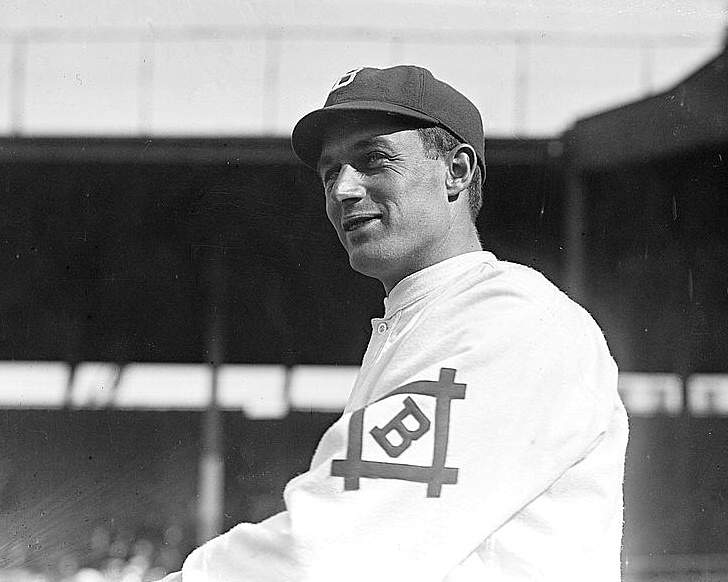
- Shortstop
- Born: August 30, 1886; Howell, Michigan
- Died: August 17, 1976 (aged 89); Marshall, Michigan
- Batted: Right Threw: Right

MLB debut
- April 12, 1911, for the Brooklyn Dodgers

Last MLB appearance
- August 9, 1912, for the Brooklyn Dodgers

MLB statistics
- Batting average: .216
- Home runs: 3
- Runs batted in: 66
- Stats at Baseball Reference

Teams
- Brooklyn Dodgers (1911–1912)

Albert R. Tooley (August 30, 1886 in Howell, Michigan – August 17, 1976 in Marshall, Michigan), was a professional baseball player who played shortstop for the Brooklyn Dodgers during the 1911 and 1912 baseball seasons. He was the last known living player to have faced Cy Young in a Major League Baseball game, dying in 1976.
