= Pat Ragan =

American baseball player (1883–1956)

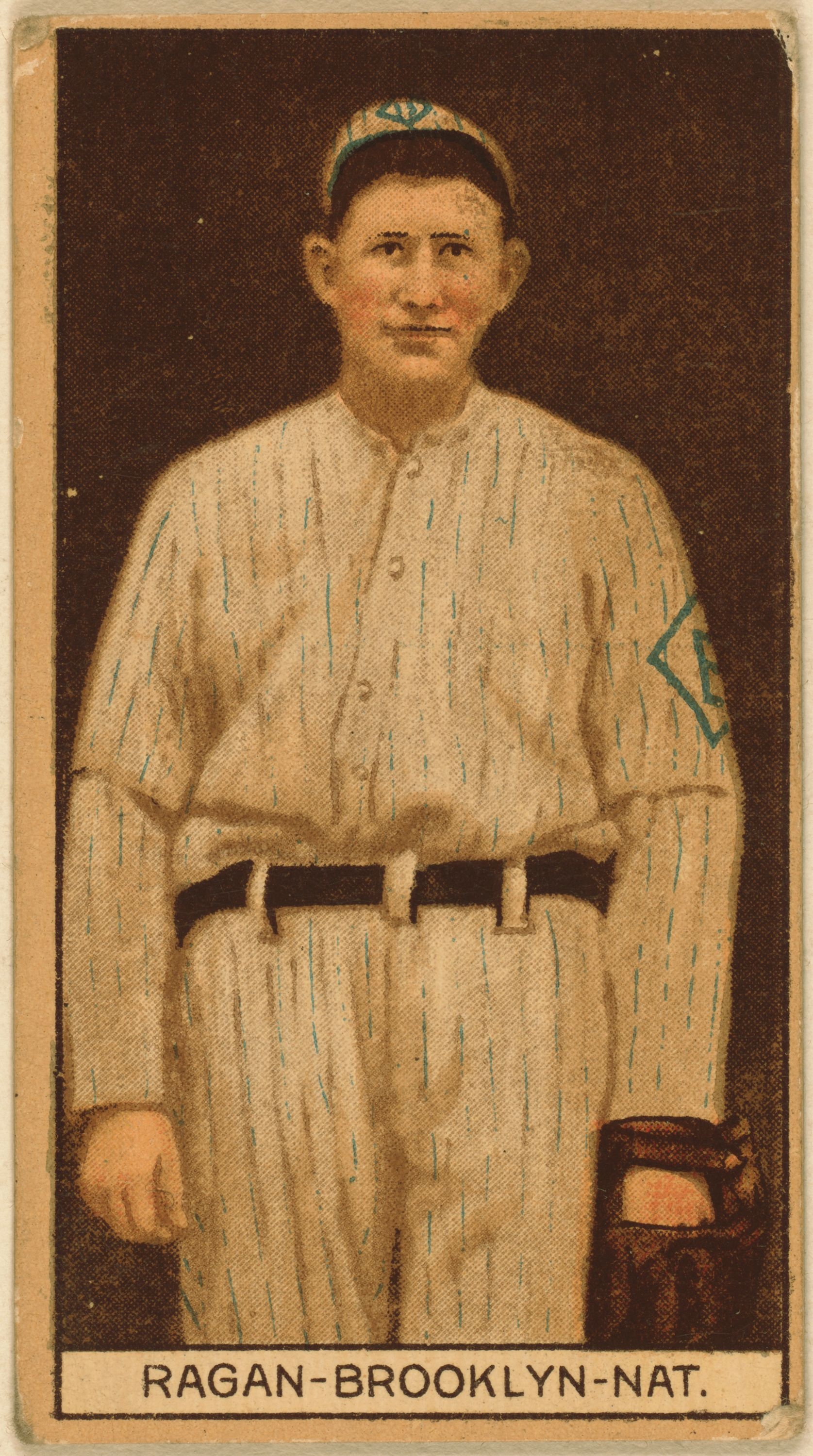
- Pitcher
- Born: November 15, 1883; Blanchard, Iowa, U.S.
- Died: September 4, 1956 (aged 72); Los Angeles, California, U.S.
- Batted: Right Threw: Right

MLB debut
- April 21, 1909, for the Cincinnati Reds

Last MLB appearance
- July 5, 1923, for the Philadelphia Phillies

MLB statistics
- Win–loss record: 77–104
- Earned run average: 2.99
- Strikeouts: 680
- Stats at Baseball Reference

Teams
- Cincinnati Reds (1909); Chicago Cubs (1909); Brooklyn Dodgers / Robins (1911–1915); Boston Braves (1915–1919); New York Giants (1919); Chicago White Sox (1919); Philadelphia Phillies (1923)

Don Carlos Patrick Ragan (November 15, 1883 – September 4, 1956) was an American professional baseball pitcher. He played in Major League Baseball (MLB) during 11 seasons from 1909 to 1923 for seven different teams, primarily the Brooklyn Dodgers / Robins and Boston Braves.

On October 5, 1914, Ragan became the second National League pitcher and the third pitcher in major-league history to throw an immaculate inning, striking out all three batters on nine total pitches in the eighth inning of a game against the Boston Braves.
