= Jud Daley =

American baseball player (1884-1967)

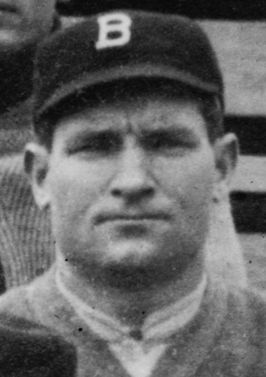
- Outfielder
- Born: March 14, 1884; South Coventry, Connecticut, U.S.
- Died: January 26, 1967 (aged 82); Gadsden, Alabama, U.S.
- Batted: Left Threw: Right

MLB debut
- September 19, 1911, for the Brooklyn Dodgers

Last MLB appearance
- July 16, 1912, for the Brooklyn Dodgers

MLB statistics
- Batting average: .250
- Home runs: 1
- Runs batted in: 20
- Stats at Baseball Reference

Teams
- Brooklyn Dodgers (1911–1912)

Judson Lawrence Daley (March 14, 1884 – January 26, 1967) was an American professional baseball outfielder and manager. He played two seasons in Major League Baseball with the Brooklyn Dodgers. Daley was 5 feet, 8 inches tall and weighed 172 pounds.

== Career ==
Daley was born in South Coventry, Connecticut, in 1884. He started his professional baseball career with the Southern Association's Shreveport Pirates in 1906. Besides one short stint in the National League, Daley played in the Southern Association until 1915. He spent the early part of his career with the Shreveport Pirates, Mobile Sea Gulls, and Montgomery Climbers.

Daley did not have a batting average above .270 in a season until 1910, when he batted .298. He led the league in at bats that year and also finished second in hits to the future major league star, Shoeless Joe Jackson. The following season, he raised his average to .306 and finished second in hits again, this time to Del Pratt. He joined the Brooklyn Dodgers late in the season, and in 19 games, he batted .231. Daley was also with the Dodgers in early 1912. He batted .256 for them before making his last MLB appearance in July.

Daley then spent the next few years back in the Southern Association. He moved to the Eastern League in 1916, where he stayed until the end of his career in 1920. During his last two seasons, he also managed his team, the Waterbury Nattatucks/Brasscos.

In 1,679 minor league games over 15 years, Daley batted .279 and had 1,710 hits. Later in life, he worked for Goodyear. He died in Gadsden, Alabama, in 1967.
