= Sandy Burk =

American baseball player (1887–1934)

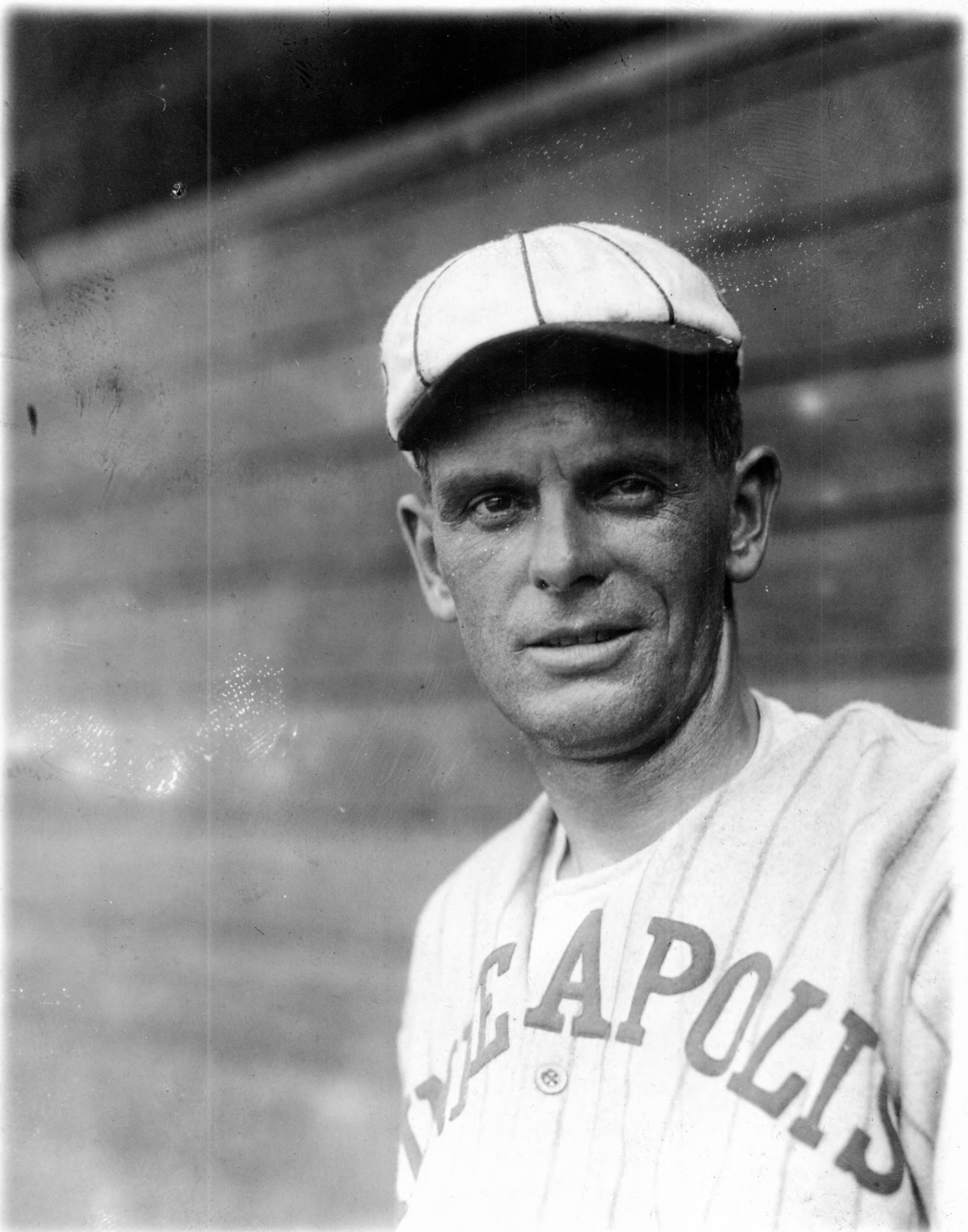
- Pitcher
- Born: April 22, 1887; Columbus, Ohio
- Died: October 11, 1934 (aged 47); Brooklyn, New York
- Batted: Right Threw: Right

MLB debut
- September 12, 1910, for the Brooklyn Superbas

Last MLB appearance
- July 31, 1915, for the Pittsburgh Rebels

MLB statistics
- Win–loss record: 4–11
- Earned run average: 4.25
- Strikeouts: 86
- Stats at Baseball Reference

Teams
- Brooklyn Superbas/Dodgers (1910–1912); St. Louis Cardinals (1912–1913); Pittsburgh Rebels (1915)

Charles Sanford Burk (April 22, 1887 – October 11, 1934) was a pitcher in Major League Baseball. He pitched from 1910 to 1915.
