= Bill Schardt =

American baseball player (1886-1964)

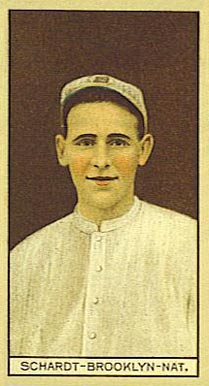
- Pitcher
- Born: January 20, 1886; Cleveland, Ohio, U.S.
- Died: July 20, 1964 (aged 78); Vermilion, Ohio, U.S.
- Batted: Right Threw: Right

MLB debut
- April 14, 1911, for the Brooklyn Dodgers

Last MLB appearance
- May 18, 1912, for the Brooklyn Dodgers

MLB statistics
- Win–loss record: 5-16
- Earned run average: 3.67
- Strikeouts: 84
- Stats at Baseball Reference

Teams
- Brooklyn Dodgers (1911–1912)

Wilburt Schardt (January 20, 1886 – July 20, 1964) was an American pitcher in Major League Baseball. Schardt pitched for the Brooklyn Dodgers from 1911 to 1912.
