= 1913 Brooklyn Dodgers season =

1913 Brooklyn Dodgers
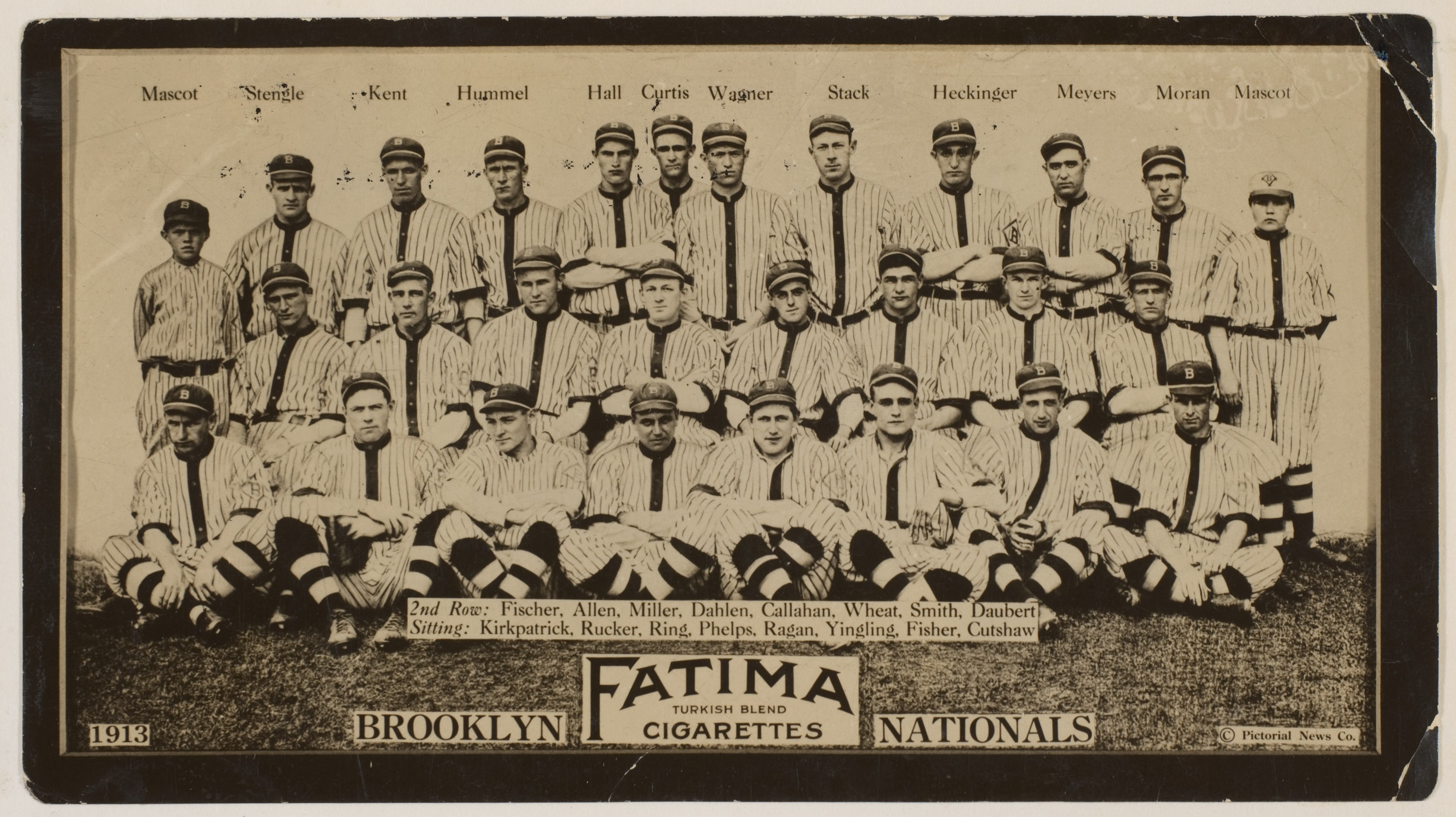
- League: National League
- Ballpark: Ebbets Field
- City: Brooklyn, New York
- Record: 65–84 (.436)
- League place: 6th
- Owners: Charles Ebbets, Ed McKeever, Stephen McKeever
- President: Charles Ebbets
- Managers: Bill Dahlen

The 1913 team saw the team named shortened to the Brooklyn Dodgers, and the team moved into brand new Ebbets Field. Jake Daubert, one of the teams few bright spots, won the Chalmers Award as the leagues Most Valuable Player. The team finished in sixth place with a 65–84–3 record.

== Offseason ==
- November 1912: Elmer Brown was purchased by the Dodgers from the St. Louis Browns.

== Regular season ==
=== Season standings ===
National League
Team	W	L	Pct.	GB	Home	Road
New York Giants	101	51	.664	—	54‍–‍23	47‍–‍28
Philadelphia Phillies	88	63	.583	12½	43‍–‍33	45‍–‍30
Chicago Cubs	88	65	.575	13½	51‍–‍25	37‍–‍40
Pittsburgh Pirates	78	71	.523	21½	41‍–‍35	37‍–‍36
Boston Braves	69	82	.457	31½	34‍–‍40	35‍–‍42
Brooklyn Dodgers	65	84	.436	34½	29‍–‍47	36‍–‍37
Cincinnati Reds	64	89	.418	37½	32‍–‍44	32‍–‍45
St. Louis Cardinals	51	99	.340	49	25‍–‍48	26‍–‍51

=== Record vs. opponents ===
1913 National League record Sources:
Team	BSN	BRO	CHC	CIN	NYG	PHI	PIT	STL
Boston	—	10–10–1	9–13	8–14	8–14	7–15–1	11–10	16–6–1
Brooklyn	10–10–1	—	9–13	9–13	8–14	8–13–1	8–14–1	13–7
Chicago	13–9	13–9	—	13–9–1	7–14	13–9	13–9	16–6–1
Cincinnati	14–8	13–9	9–13–1	—	5–17	5–17–1	8–13–1	10–12
New York	14–8	14–8	14–7	17–5	—	14–8–3	14–8–1	14–7
Philadelphia	15–7–1	13–8–1	9–13	17–5–1	8–14–3	—	9–11–2	17–5
Pittsburgh	10–11	14–8–1	9–13	13–8–1	8–14–1	11–9–2	—	13–8–1
St. Louis	6–16–1	7–13	6–16–1	12–10	7–14	5–17	8–13–1	—

=== Notable transactions ===
- August 14, 1913: Eddie Stack and cash were traded by the Dodgers to the Chicago Cubs for Ed Reulbach.

=== Roster ===
1913 Brooklyn Dodgers
Roster
Pitchers: Frank Allen; Elmer Brown; Cliff Curtis; Bill Hall; Maury Kent; Jeff Pfeffer; Pat Ragan; Ed Reulbach; Nap Rucker; Eddie Stack; Bull Wagner; Mysterious Walker; Earl Yingling	Catchers: Tex Erwin; William Fischer; Mike Hechinger; Lew McCarty; Otto Miller; Ed Phelps; Infielders: George Cutshaw; Jake Daubert; Bob Fisher; Enos Kirkpatrick; Red Smith; Ray Mowe	Outfielders: Leo Callahan; Bill Collins; John Hummel; Benny Meyer; Herbie Moran; Al Scheer; Casey Stengel; Zack Wheat	Manager: Bill Dahlen

== Player stats ==
=== Batting ===
==== Starters by position ====
Note: Pos = Position; G = Games played; AB = At bats; H = Hits; Avg. = Batting average; HR = Home runs; RBI = Runs batted in

Pos	Player	G	AB	H	Avg.	HR	RBI
C	Otto Miller	104	320	87	.272	0	26
1B	Jake Daubert	139	508	178	.350	2	52
2B	George Cutshaw	147	592	158	.267	7	80
3B	Red Smith	151	540	160	.296	6	76
SS	Bob Fisher	132	474	124	.262	4	54
OF	Zack Wheat	138	535	161	.301	7	58
OF	Herbie Moran	132	515	137	.266	0	26
OF	Casey Stengel	124	438	119	.272	7	43

==== Other batters ====
Note: G = Games played; AB = At bats; H = Hits; Avg. = Batting average; HR = Home runs; RBI = Runs batted in

Player	G	AB	H	Avg.	HR	RBI
John Hummel	67	198	48	.242	2	24
William Fischer	62	165	44	.267	1	12
Bill Collins	32	95	18	.189	0	4
Enos Kirkpatrick	48	89	22	.247	1	5
Benny Meyer	38	87	17	.195	1	10
Leo Callahan	33	41	7	.171	0	3
Tex Erwin	20	31	8	.258	0	3
Lew McCarty	9	26	6	.231	0	2
Al Scheer	6	22	5	.227	0	0
Ed Phelps	15	18	4	.222	0	0
Mike Hechinger	9	11	2	.182	0	0
Ray Mowe	5	9	1	.111	0	0

=== Pitching ===
==== Starting pitchers ====
Note: G = Games pitched; IP = Innings pitched; W = Wins; L = Losses; ERA = Earned run average; SO = Strikeouts; BB = Walks

Player	G	IP	W	L	ERA	SO	BB
Pat Ragan	44	264.2	15	18	3.77	109	64
Nap Rucker	41	260.0	14	15	2.87	111	67
Frank Allen	34	174.2	4	18	2.83	82	81
Cliff Curtis	30	151.2	8	9	3.26	57	55
Ed Reulbach	15	110.0	7	6	2.05	46	34

==== Other pitchers ====
Note: G = Games pitched; IP = Innings pitched; W = Wins; L = Losses; ERA = Earned run average; SO = Strikeouts; BB = Walks

Player	G	IP	W	L	ERA	SO	BB
Earl Yingling	26	146.2	8	8	2.58	40	10
Eddie Stack	23	87.0	4	4	2.38	34	32
Bull Wagner	18	70.2	4	2	5.48	11	30
Mysterious Walker	11	58.1	1	3	3.55	35	35
Jeff Pfeffer	5	24.1	0	1	3.33	13	13
Elmer Brown	3	13.0	0	0	2.08	6	10
Maury Kent	3	7.1	0	0	2.45	1	3
Bill Hall	3	4.2	0	0	5.79	3	5

== Awards and honors ==
- National League Most Valuable Player
  - Jake Daubert
