= 1913 St. Louis Cardinals season =

Major League Baseball season

1913 St. Louis Cardinals
- League: National League
- Ballpark: Robison Field
- City: St. Louis, Missouri
- Record: 51–99 (.340)
- League place: 8th
- Owners: Helene Hathaway Britton
- Managers: Miller Huggins

The 1913 St. Louis Cardinals season was the team's 32nd season in St. Louis, Missouri and its 22nd season in the National League. The Cardinals went 51–99 during the season and finished eighth in the National League.

== Regular season ==
=== Season standings ===
National League
Team	W	L	Pct.	GB	Home	Road
New York Giants	101	51	.664	—	54‍–‍23	47‍–‍28
Philadelphia Phillies	88	63	.583	12½	43‍–‍33	45‍–‍30
Chicago Cubs	88	65	.575	13½	51‍–‍25	37‍–‍40
Pittsburgh Pirates	78	71	.523	21½	41‍–‍35	37‍–‍36
Boston Braves	69	82	.457	31½	34‍–‍40	35‍–‍42
Brooklyn Dodgers	65	84	.436	34½	29‍–‍47	36‍–‍37
Cincinnati Reds	64	89	.418	37½	32‍–‍44	32‍–‍45
St. Louis Cardinals	51	99	.340	49	25‍–‍48	26‍–‍51

=== Record vs. opponents ===
1913 National League record Sources:
Team	BSN	BRO	CHC	CIN	NYG	PHI	PIT	STL
Boston	—	10–10–1	9–13	8–14	8–14	7–15–1	11–10	16–6–1
Brooklyn	10–10–1	—	9–13	9–13	8–14	8–13–1	8–14–1	13–7
Chicago	13–9	13–9	—	13–9–1	7–14	13–9	13–9	16–6–1
Cincinnati	14–8	13–9	9–13–1	—	5–17	5–17–1	8–13–1	10–12
New York	14–8	14–8	14–7	17–5	—	14–8–3	14–8–1	14–7
Philadelphia	15–7–1	13–8–1	9–13	17–5–1	8–14–3	—	9–11–2	17–5
Pittsburgh	10–11	14–8–1	9–13	13–8–1	8–14–1	11–9–2	—	13–8–1
St. Louis	6–16–1	7–13	6–16–1	12–10	7–14	5–17	8–13–1	—

=== Roster ===
1913 St. Louis Cardinals
Roster
Pitchers: Sandy Burk; Bill Doak; Rube Geyer; Dan Griner; Bob Harmon; Bill Hopper; Ben Hunt; Walt Marbet; Dick Niehaus; Pol Perritt; Phil Redding; Slim Sallee; Bill Steele; Harry Trekell; Joe Willis	Catchers: Palmer Hildebrand; Larry McLean; Heinie Peitz; Skipper Roberts; Frank Snyder; Ivey Wingo; Infielders: Zinn Beck; Al Cabrera; Wese Callahan; Arnold Hauser; Miller Huggins; Ed Konetchy; Mike Mowrey; Charley O'Leary	Outfielders: Ted Cather; Steve Evans; Lee Magee; Chuck Miller; Rebel Oakes; Finners Quinlan; Jimmy Sheckard; Possum Whitted; Other batters: Doc Crandall; John Vann; Jimmy Whelan	Manager: Miller Huggins; Coaches: Charley O'Leary; Heinie Peitz

== Player stats ==
=== Batting ===
==== Starters by position ====
Note: Pos = Position; G = Games played; AB = At bats; H = Hits; Avg. = Batting average; HR = Home runs; RBI = Runs batted in

Pos	Player	G	AB	H	Avg.	HR	RBI
C	Ivey Wingo	112	307	78	.254	2	35
1B	Ed Konetchy	140	504	139	.276	8	68
2B	Miller Huggins	121	382	109	.285	0	27
SS	Charley O'Leary	121	406	88	.217	0	31
3B	Mike Mowrey	132	450	117	.260	0	33
OF	Steve Evans	97	245	61	.249	1	31
OF	Rebel Oakes	147	539	158	.293	0	49
OF	Lee Magee	137	531	142	.267	2	31

==== Other batters ====
Note: G = Games played; AB = At bats; H = Hits; Avg. = Batting average; HR = Home runs; RBI = Runs batted in

Player	G	AB	H	Avg.	HR	RBI
Possum Whitted	123	404	89	.220	0	38
Ted Cather	67	183	39	.213	0	12
Larry McLean	48	152	41	.270	0	12
Jimmy Sheckard	52	136	27	.199	0	17
Palmer Hildebrand	26	55	9	.164	0	1
Finners Quinlan	13	50	8	.160	0	1
Arnold Hauser	22	45	13	.289	0	9
Skipper Roberts	26	41	6	.146	0	3
Zinn Beck	10	30	5	.167	0	2
Frank Snyder	7	21	4	.190	0	2
Wese Callahan	7	14	4	.286	0	1
Chuck Miller	4	12	2	.167	0	1
Heinie Peitz	3	4	1	.250	0	0
Doc Crandall	2	2	0	.000	0	0
Alfredo Cabrera	1	2	0	.000	0	0
Jimmy Whelan	1	1	0	.000	0	0
John Vann	1	1	0	.000	0	0

=== Pitching ===
==== Starting pitchers ====
Note: G = Games pitched; IP = Innings pitched; W = Wins; L = Losses; ERA = Earned run average; SO = Strikeouts

Player	G	IP	W	L	ERA	SO
Dan Griner	34	225.0	10	22	5.08	79
Bill Doak	15	93.0	2	8	3.10	51
Bill Steele	12	54.0	4	4	5.00	10
Bill Hopper	3	24.0	0	3	3.75	3
Dick Niehaus	3	24.0	0	2	4.13	4

==== Other pitchers ====
Note: G = Games pitched; IP = Innings pitched; W = Wins; L = Losses; ERA = Earned run average; SO = Strikeouts

Player	G	IP	W	L	ERA	SO
Slim Sallee	50	276.0	19	15	2.71	106
Bob Harmon	42	273.1	8	21	3.92	66
Pol Perritt	36	175.0	6	14	5.25	64
Sandy Burk	19	70.0	0	2	5.14	29
Harry Trekell	7	30.0	0	1	4.50	15
Ben Hunt	2	8.0	0	1	3.38	6
Walt Marbet	3	3.1	0	1	16.20	1

==== Relief pitchers ====
Note: G = Games pitched; W = Wins; L = Losses; SV = Saves; ERA = Earned run average; SO = Strikeouts

Player	G	W	L	SV	ERA	SO
Rube Geyer	30	1	5	1	5.26	21
Joe Willis	7	0	0	1	7.45	6
Ed Konetchy	1	1	0	0	0.00	3
Phil Redding	1	0	0	0	6.75	1
Ted Cather	1	0	0	0	54.00	0
