= 1913 Cincinnati Reds season =

1913 Cincinnati Reds
- League: National League
- Ballpark: Redland Field
- City: Cincinnati, Ohio
- Owners: Garry Herrmann
- Managers: Joe Tinker

The 1913 Cincinnati Reds season was a season in American baseball. The team finished seventh in the National League with a record of 64–89, 37 1/2 games behind the New York Giants.

== Off-season ==
On December 15, the Reds and Chicago Cubs were involved in an eight-player trade. Cincinnati sent Red Corriden, whom the team just acquired four days earlier from the Detroit Tigers for $7500, Bert Humphries, Pete Knisely, Mike Mitchell and Art Phelan to the Cubs for Joe Tinker, Grover Lowdermilk, and Harry Chapman.

Tinker was named as manager of the team after the trade, as he would take over as player-manager, replacing Hank O'Day. Tinker played with the Cubs since 1901, and helped them win the World Series in 1907 and 1908. Tinker was coming off a great season in 1912, as he hit .282 and earned a career-high 77 RBI. He finished fourth in National League MVP voting.

On January 1, the club sold catcher Larry McLean to the St. Louis Cardinals. Two days later, Cincinnati acquired Mordecai Brown from the Louisville Colonels of the American Association for Grover Lowdermilk.

== Regular season ==
Tinker ended up missing several weeks of the regular season when he gave blood for his wife's blood transfusion. He hit a career-high .317, along with one home run and 57 RBI in 110 games. He also played great defense at shortstop, setting a career high in fielding percentage at .968.

Early in the season, Cincinnati traded away Harry Chapman and Tex McDonald to the Boston Braves for veteran catcher Johnny Kling. Kling played with Tinker on the Chicago Cubs from 1901 to 1911.

On May 23, the Reds traded struggling pitcher Art Fromme to the New York Giants, receiving pitcher Red Ames, outfielder Josh Devore, second baseman Heinie Groh and $20,000. Ames, an eleven-year veteran, had a 108–77 record and a 2.45 ERA with the Giants, and helped New York win the 1905 World Series.

Chief Johnson emerged as the ace of the pitching staff in his rookie season, going 14–16 with a 3.01 ERA in 44 games. Johnson led the team with 269 innings pitched, 13 complete games and 107 strikeouts. Ames led the Reds with a 2.88 ERA, posting a record of 11–12 and pitching 187.1 innings after his mid-season trade from the New York Giants. The Reds pitching staff struggled, as their team ERA of 3.46 was seventh in the National League.

=== Season summary ===
The Reds got off to a very poor start in 1913, going 4–16 in their first twenty games, sitting in last place. The club remained in last place until the end of July, as on July 29, they passed the St. Louis Cardinals in the standings after a win over the Brooklyn Superbas to improve their record to 36-59. Cincinnati would finish the season in seventh place with a 64-89 record. Their .418 winning percentage was their lowest since 1901. The Reds finished 37.5 games behind the first-place New York Giants.

=== Season standings ===
National League
Team	W	L	Pct.	GB	Home	Road
New York Giants	101	51	.664	—	54‍–‍23	47‍–‍28
Philadelphia Phillies	88	63	.583	12½	43‍–‍33	45‍–‍30
Chicago Cubs	88	65	.575	13½	51‍–‍25	37‍–‍40
Pittsburgh Pirates	78	71	.523	21½	41‍–‍35	37‍–‍36
Boston Braves	69	82	.457	31½	34‍–‍40	35‍–‍42
Brooklyn Dodgers	65	84	.436	34½	29‍–‍47	36‍–‍37
Cincinnati Reds	64	89	.418	37½	32‍–‍44	32‍–‍45
St. Louis Cardinals	51	99	.340	49	25‍–‍48	26‍–‍51

=== Record vs. opponents ===
1913 National League record Sources:
Team	BOS	BR	CHI	CIN	NYG	PHI	PIT	STL
Boston	—	10–10–1	9–13	8–14	8–14	7–15–1	11–10	16–6–1
Brooklyn	10–10–1	—	9–13	9–13	8–14	8–13–1	8–14–1	13–7
Chicago	13–9	13–9	—	13–9–1	7–14	13–9	13–9	16–6–1
Cincinnati	14–8	13–9	9–13–1	—	5–17	5–17–1	8–13–1	10–12
New York	14–8	14–8	14–7	17–5	—	14–8–3	14–8–1	14–7
Philadelphia	15–7–1	13–8–1	9–13	17–5–1	8–14–3	—	9–11–2	17–5
Pittsburgh	10–11	14–8–1	9–13	13–8–1	8–14–1	11–9–2	—	13–8–1
St. Louis	6–16–1	7–13	6–16–1	12–10	7–14	5–17	8–13–1	—

=== Roster ===
1913 Cincinnati Reds
Roster
Pitchers: Red Ames; Rube Benton; Harry Betts; Mordecai Brown; Art Fromme; Andy Harrington; Frank Harter; Ernie Herbert; Chief Johnson; Harry McIntire; Joe McManus; Cy Morgan; Red Nelson; Gene Packard; Bill Powell; Dick Robertson; Jack Rowan; Chick Smith; George Suggs; Ralph Works	Catchers: Earl Blackburn; Tommy Clarke; Johnny Kling; Hank Severeid; Mark Stewart; Infielders: Rafael Almeida; Marty Berghammer; John Dodge; Dick Egan; Eddie Grant; Heinie Groh; Bill Hobbs; Dick Hoblitzel; Tex McDonald; Bert Niehoff; Joe Tinker	Outfielders: Johnny Bates; Beals Becker; Bob Bescher; Josh Devore; Armando Marsans; Karl Meister; Jimmy Sheckard; Al Wickland; Other batters: Harry Chapman	Manager: Joe Tinker

== Player stats ==
=== Batting ===
==== Starters by position ====
Note: Pos = Position; G = Games played; AB = At bats; H = Hits; Avg. = Batting average; HR = Home runs; RBI = Runs batted in

Pos	Player	G	AB	H	Avg.	HR	RBI
C	Tommy Clarke	114	330	87	.264	1	38
1B	Dick Hoblitzell	137	502	143	.285	3	62
2B	Heinie Groh	117	397	112	.282	3	48
3B	John Dodge	94	323	78	.241	4	45
SS	Joe Tinker	110	382	121	.317	1	57
OF	Armando Marsans	118	435	129	.297	0	38
OF	Johnny Bates	131	407	113	.278	6	51
OF	Bob Bescher	141	511	132	.258	1	37

==== Other batters ====
Note: G = Games played; AB = At bats; H = Hits; Avg. = Batting average; HR = Home runs; RBI = Runs batted in

Player	G	AB	H	Avg.	HR	RBI
Josh Devore	66	217	58	.267	3	14
Johnny Kling	80	209	57	.273	0	23
Dick Egan	60	195	55	.282	0	22
Marty Berghammer	74	188	41	.218	1	13
Rafael Almeida	50	130	34	.262	3	21
Jimmy Sheckard	47	116	22	.190	0	7
Beals Becker	30	108	32	.296	0	14
Eddie Grant	27	94	20	.213	0	9
Al Wickland	26	79	17	.215	0	8
Earl Blackburn	17	27	7	.259	0	3
Tex McDonald	11	10	3	.300	0	2
Bert Niehoff	2	8	0	.000	0	0
Karl Meister	4	7	2	.286	0	2
Hank Severeid	8	6	0	.000	0	0
Bill Hobbs	4	4	0	.000	0	0
Harry Chapman	2	2	1	.500	0	0
Mark Stewart	1	1	0	.000	0	0

=== Pitching ===
==== Starting pitchers ====
Note: G = Games pitched; IP = Innings pitched; W = Wins; L = Losses; ERA = Earned run average; SO = Strikeouts

Player	G	IP	W	L	ERA	SO
Chief Johnson	44	269.0	14	16	3.01	107
Red Ames	31	187.1	11	13	2.88	80
Rube Benton	23	144.1	11	7	3.49	68
Art Fromme	9	56.0	1	4	4.18	24
Jack Rowan	5	39.0	0	4	3.00	21
Cy Morgan	1	2.1	0	1	15.43	2
Bill Powell	1	0.1	0	1	54.00	0

==== Other pitchers ====
Note: G = Games pitched; IP = Innings pitched; W = Wins; L = Losses; ERA = Earned run average; SO = Strikeouts

Player	G	IP	W	L	ERA	SO
George Suggs	36	199.0	8	15	4.03	73
Gene Packard	39	190.2	7	11	2.97	73
Mordecai Brown	39	173.1	11	12	2.91	41
Chick Smith	5	17.2	0	1	3.57	11
Ralph Works	5	15.0	0	1	7.80	4
Dick Robertson	2	10.0	0	1	7.20	1

==== Relief pitchers ====
Note: G = Games pitched; W = Wins; L = Losses; SV = Saves; ERA = Earned run average; SO = Strikeouts

Player	G	W	L	SV	ERA	SO
Frank Harter	17	1	1	0	3.86	10
Ernie Herbert	6	0	0	0	2.08	5
Red Nelson	2	0	0	0	37.80	0
Andy Harrington	1	0	0	0	9.00	1
Harry Betts	1	0	0	0	2.70	0
Joe McManus	1	0	0	0	18.00	0
Harry McIntire	1	0	1	0	27.00	0
