= 1913 Pittsburgh Pirates season =

1913 Pittsburgh Pirates
- League: National League
- Ballpark: Forbes Field
- City: Pittsburgh, Pennsylvania
- Owners: Barney Dreyfuss
- Managers: Fred Clarke

The 1913 Pittsburgh Pirates season was the 32nd season of the Pittsburgh Pirates franchise; the 27th in the National League. The Pirates finished fourth in the league standings with a record of 78–71.

== Regular season ==
=== Season standings ===
National League
| Team | W | L | Pct. | GB | Home | Road |
|---|---|---|---|---|---|---|
| New York Giants | 101 | 51 | .664 | — | 54‍–‍23 | 47‍–‍28 |
| Philadelphia Phillies | 88 | 63 | .583 | 12½ | 43‍–‍33 | 45‍–‍30 |
| Chicago Cubs | 88 | 65 | .575 | 13½ | 51‍–‍25 | 37‍–‍40 |
| Pittsburgh Pirates | 78 | 71 | .523 | 21½ | 41‍–‍35 | 37‍–‍36 |
| Boston Braves | 69 | 82 | .457 | 31½ | 34‍–‍40 | 35‍–‍42 |
| Brooklyn Dodgers | 65 | 84 | .436 | 34½ | 29‍–‍47 | 36‍–‍37 |
| Cincinnati Reds | 64 | 89 | .418 | 37½ | 32‍–‍44 | 32‍–‍45 |
| St. Louis Cardinals | 51 | 99 | .340 | 49 | 25‍–‍48 | 26‍–‍51 |

=== Record vs. opponents ===
1913 National League record Sources:
| Team | BSN | BRO | CHC | CIN | NYG | PHI | PIT | STL |
|---|---|---|---|---|---|---|---|---|
| Boston | — | 10–10–1 | 9–13 | 8–14 | 8–14 | 7–15–1 | 11–10 | 16–6–1 |
| Brooklyn | 10–10–1 | — | 9–13 | 9–13 | 8–14 | 8–13–1 | 8–14–1 | 13–7 |
| Chicago | 13–9 | 13–9 | — | 13–9–1 | 7–14 | 13–9 | 13–9 | 16–6–1 |
| Cincinnati | 14–8 | 13–9 | 9–13–1 | — | 5–17 | 5–17–1 | 8–13–1 | 10–12 |
| New York | 14–8 | 14–8 | 14–7 | 17–5 | — | 14–8–3 | 14–8–1 | 14–7 |
| Philadelphia | 15–7–1 | 13–8–1 | 9–13 | 17–5–1 | 8–14–3 | — | 9–11–2 | 17–5 |
| Pittsburgh | 10–11 | 14–8–1 | 9–13 | 13–8–1 | 8–14–1 | 11–9–2 | — | 13–8–1 |
| St. Louis | 6–16–1 | 7–13 | 6–16–1 | 12–10 | 7–14 | 5–17 | 8–13–1 | — |

=== Notable transactions ===
- April 28, 1913: Rivington Bisland was purchased from the Pirates by the Atlanta Crackers.
- June 24, 1913: Everitt Booe was traded by the Pirates to the Springfield Senators for Fred Kommers. Booe was returned to the Pirates on June 30, with the Pirates sending Maurice Farrell (minors) to the Senators to complete the deal.
- July 1, 1913: Everitt Booe was selected off waivers from the Pirates by the St. Paul Saints.

=== Roster ===
1913 Pittsburgh Pirates
Roster
| Pitchers: Babe Adams; Howie Camnitz; Joe Conzelman; Wilbur Cooper; Bernie Duffy; Eddie Eayrs; Jack Ferry; Claude Hendrix; Wild Bill Luhrsen; Al Mamaux; George McQuillan; Marty O'Toole; Hank Robinson; John Scheneberg | Catchers: Bob Coleman; George Gibson; Jake Kafora; Billy Kelly; Mike Simon; Infielders: Gil Britton; Art Butler; Bobby Byrne; Cozy Dolan; Ham Hyatt; Alex McCarthy; Dots Miller; Jim Viox; Honus Wagner | Outfielders: Everitt Booe; Max Carey; Fred Clarke; Solly Hofman; Fred Kommers; Ed Mensor; Mike Mitchell; Chief Wilson; Roy Wood | Manager: Fred Clarke |

== Statistics ==
Batting

Note: G = Games played; AB = At-bats; H = Hits; Avg. = Batting average; HR = Home runs; RBI = Runs batted in

Regular Season
| Player | G | AB | H | Avg. | HR | RBI |
|---|---|---|---|---|---|---|
| John Scheneberg | 1 | 2 | 1 | 0.500 | 0 | 1 |
| Ham Hyatt | 63 | 81 | 27 | 0.333 | 4 | 16 |
| Jim Viox | 137 | 492 | 156 | 0.317 | 2 | 65 |
| Honus Wagner | 114 | 413 | 124 | 0.300 | 3 | 56 |
| Babe Adams | 43 | 114 | 33 | 0.289 | 0 | 13 |
| Roy Wood | 14 | 35 | 10 | 0.286 | 0 | 2 |
| Art Butler | 82 | 214 | 60 | 0.280 | 0 | 20 |
| George Gibson | 48 | 118 | 33 | 0.280 | 0 | 12 |
| Max Carey | 154 | 620 | 172 | 0.277 | 5 | 49 |
| Claude Hendrix | 53 | 99 | 27 | 0.273 | 1 | 8 |
| Dots Miller | 154 | 580 | 158 | 0.272 | 7 | 90 |
| Mike Mitchell | 54 | 199 | 54 | 0.271 | 1 | 16 |
| Bobby Byrne | 113 | 448 | 121 | 0.270 | 1 | 47 |
| Billy Kelly | 48 | 82 | 22 | 0.268 | 0 | 9 |
| Chief Wilson | 155 | 580 | 154 | 0.266 | 10 | 73 |
| Bernie Duffy | 3 | 4 | 1 | 0.250 | 0 | 1 |
| Mike Simon | 92 | 255 | 63 | 0.247 | 1 | 17 |
| Fred Kommers | 40 | 155 | 36 | 0.232 | 0 | 22 |
| Solly Hofman | 28 | 83 | 19 | 0.229 | 0 | 7 |
| Cozy Dolan | 35 | 133 | 27 | 0.203 | 0 | 9 |
| Alex McCarthy | 31 | 74 | 15 | 0.203 | 0 | 10 |
| Everett Booe | 29 | 80 | 16 | 0.200 | 0 | 2 |
| Hank Robinson | 43 | 61 | 11 | 0.180 | 0 | 6 |
| Bob Coleman | 24 | 50 | 9 | 0.180 | 0 | 9 |
| Ed Mensor | 44 | 56 | 10 | 0.179 | 0 | 1 |
| Eddie Eayrs | 4 | 6 | 1 | 0.167 | 0 | 0 |
| Howie Camnitz | 36 | 59 | 9 | 0.153 | 0 | 2 |
| Marty O'Toole | 26 | 53 | 7 | 0.132 | 0 | 3 |
| George McQuillan | 25 | 39 | 4 | 0.103 | 0 | 3 |
| Fred Clarke | 9 | 13 | 1 | 0.077 | 0 | 0 |
| Wilbur Cooper | 30 | 26 | 2 | 0.077 | 0 | 1 |
| Gil Britton | 3 | 12 | 0 | 0.000 | 0 | 0 |
| Joe Conzelman | 3 | 4 | 0 | 0.000 | 0 | 0 |
| Jake Kafora | 1 | 1 | 0 | 0.000 | 0 | 0 |
| Wild Bill Luhrsen | 5 | 10 | 0 | 0.000 | 0 | 0 |
| Al Mamaux | 1 | 1 | 0 | 0.000 | 0 | 0 |
| Jack Ferry | 4 | 0 | 0 | — | 0 | 0 |
| Totals | 155 | 5,252 | 1,383 | 0.263 | 35 | 570 |

Pitching

Note: G = Games pitched; IP = Innings pitched; W = Wins; L = Losses; ERA = Earned run average; SO = Strikeouts

Regular Season
| Player | G | IP | W | L | ERA | SO |
|---|---|---|---|---|---|---|
| Joe Conzelman | 3 | 15 | 0 | 1 | 1.20 | 9 |
| Babe Adams | 43 | 313 2/3 | 21 | 10 | 2.15 | 144 |
| Eddie Eayrs | 2 | 8 | 0 | 0 | 2.25 | 5 |
| Hank Robinson | 43 | 196 1/3 | 14 | 9 | 2.38 | 50 |
| Wild Bill Luhrsen | 5 | 29 | 3 | 1 | 2.48 | 11 |
| Claude Hendrix | 42 | 241 | 14 | 15 | 2.84 | 138 |
| Al Mamaux | 1 | 3 | 0 | 0 | 3.00 | 2 |
| Wilbur Cooper | 30 | 93 | 5 | 3 | 3.29 | 39 |
| Marty O'Toole | 26 | 144 2/3 | 6 | 8 | 3.30 | 58 |
| George McQuillan | 25 | 141 2/3 | 8 | 6 | 3.43 | 59 |
| Howie Camnitz | 36 | 192 1/3 | 6 | 17 | 3.74 | 64 |
| Jack Ferry | 4 | 5 | 1 | 0 | 5.40 | 2 |
| Bernie Duffy | 3 | 11 1/3 | 0 | 0 | 5.56 | 8 |
| John Scheneberg | 1 | 6 | 0 | 1 | 6.00 | 1 |
| Totals | 155 | 1,400 | 78 | 71 | 2.90 | 590 |
