= 1913 Philadelphia Phillies season =

Major League Baseball season

1913 Philadelphia Phillies
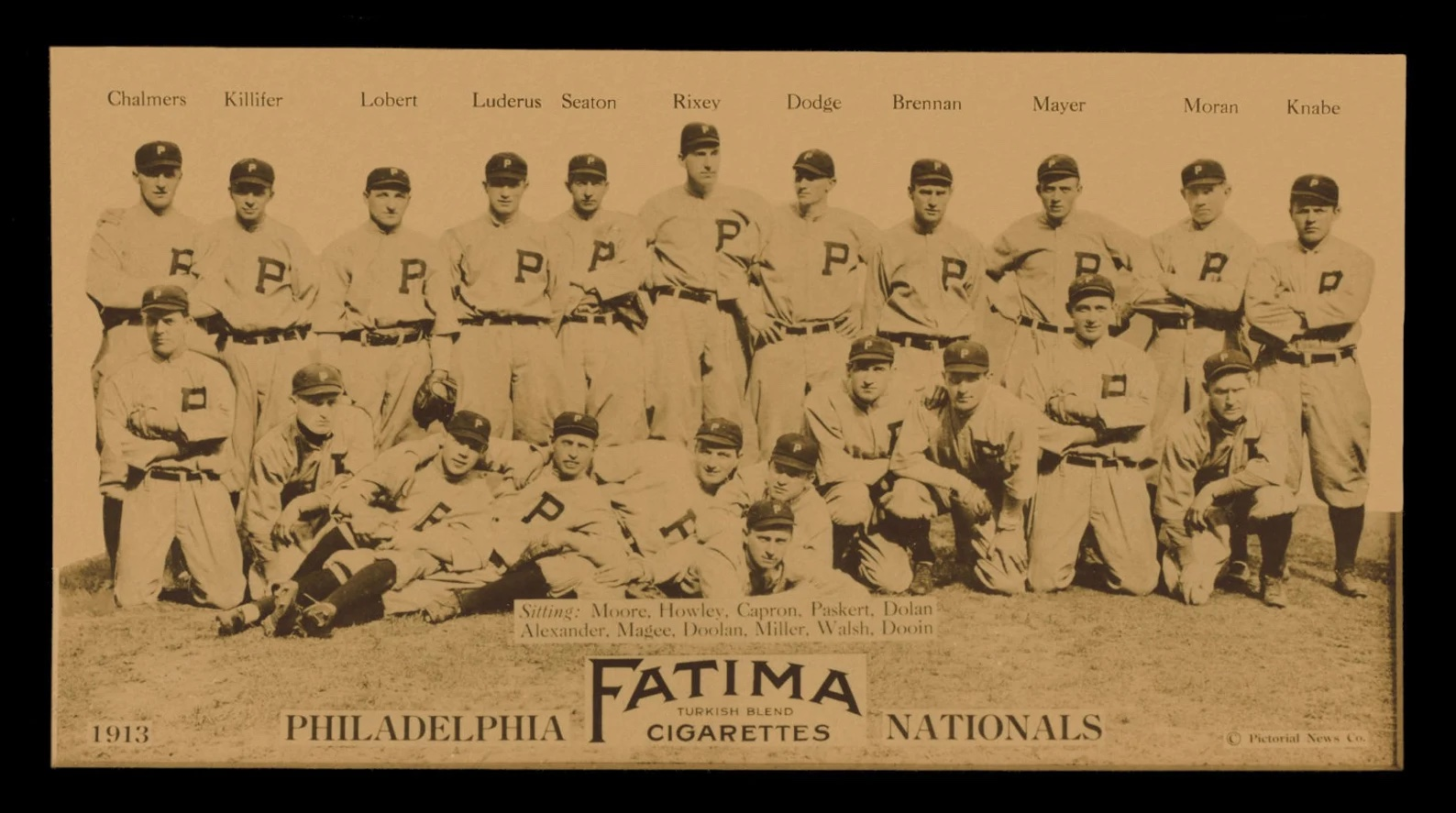
- T200 Fatima 1913 Philadelphia Phillies
- League: National League
- Ballpark: National League Park
- City: Philadelphia, Pennsylvania
- Owners: William H. Locke; William F. Baker
- Managers: Red Dooin

The 1913 Philadelphia Phillies season was a season in American baseball. It involved the Phillies competing in the National League and finishing in second place.

== Off season ==
On January 15, 1913 it was announced that Pittsburgh Pirates secretary William H. Locke had purchased the Phillies. Locke became the new team president, his cousin, former New York City Police Commissioner William F. Baker assumed the role of Vice President, and his father-in-law Daniel C. Snyder became the club's secretary-treasurer.

== Regular season ==
The Phillies started out with high hopes. They led the National League on June 25 with a 38–17 record. As the Athletics were dominating the American League, the two teams appeared well on their way to meeting in the World Series. But the Phillies lost 13 of their next 16 games to fall into second place, and never recovered. 1913 would mark the closest that the A's and Phillies ever got to meeting in the World Series before the former team moved west. On August 14, 1913, owner William H. Locke died in Ventnor, New Jersey after a long illness. Two months later his widow would sell her shares to William F. Baker, who became the new team president.

=== Season standings ===
National League
| Team | W | L | Pct. | GB | Home | Road |
|---|---|---|---|---|---|---|
| New York Giants | 101 | 51 | .664 | — | 54‍–‍23 | 47‍–‍28 |
| Philadelphia Phillies | 88 | 63 | .583 | 12½ | 43‍–‍33 | 45‍–‍30 |
| Chicago Cubs | 88 | 65 | .575 | 13½ | 51‍–‍25 | 37‍–‍40 |
| Pittsburgh Pirates | 78 | 71 | .523 | 21½ | 41‍–‍35 | 37‍–‍36 |
| Boston Braves | 69 | 82 | .457 | 31½ | 34‍–‍40 | 35‍–‍42 |
| Brooklyn Dodgers | 65 | 84 | .436 | 34½ | 29‍–‍47 | 36‍–‍37 |
| Cincinnati Reds | 64 | 89 | .418 | 37½ | 32‍–‍44 | 32‍–‍45 |
| St. Louis Cardinals | 51 | 99 | .340 | 49 | 25‍–‍48 | 26‍–‍51 |

=== Record vs. opponents ===
1913 National League record Sources:
| Team | BSN | BRO | CHC | CIN | NYG | PHI | PIT | STL |
|---|---|---|---|---|---|---|---|---|
| Boston | — | 10–10–1 | 9–13 | 8–14 | 8–14 | 7–15–1 | 11–10 | 16–6–1 |
| Brooklyn | 10–10–1 | — | 9–13 | 9–13 | 8–14 | 8–13–1 | 8–14–1 | 13–7 |
| Chicago | 13–9 | 13–9 | — | 13–9–1 | 7–14 | 13–9 | 13–9 | 16–6–1 |
| Cincinnati | 14–8 | 13–9 | 9–13–1 | — | 5–17 | 5–17–1 | 8–13–1 | 10–12 |
| New York | 14–8 | 14–8 | 14–7 | 17–5 | — | 14–8–3 | 14–8–1 | 14–7 |
| Philadelphia | 15–7–1 | 13–8–1 | 9–13 | 17–5–1 | 8–14–3 | — | 9–11–2 | 17–5 |
| Pittsburgh | 10–11 | 14–8–1 | 9–13 | 13–8–1 | 8–14–1 | 11–9–2 | — | 13–8–1 |
| St. Louis | 6–16–1 | 7–13 | 6–16–1 | 12–10 | 7–14 | 5–17 | 8–13–1 | — |

=== Notable transactions ===
- August 29, 1913: Dan Howley and $10,000 were traded by the Phillies to the Montreal Royals for Ed Burns.

=== Roster ===
1913 Philadelphia Phillies
Roster
| Pitchers: Pete Alexander; Ad Brennan; Howie Camnitz; George Chalmers; Happy Finneran; Jim Haislip; Ray Hartranft; Doc Imlay; Rube Marshall; Erskine Mayer; Earl Moore; Red Nelson; Eppa Rixey; Tom Seaton | Catchers: Ed Burns; Red Dooin; Dan Howley; Bill Killefer; Infielders: Bobby Byrne; John Dodge; Mickey Doolan; Otto Knabe; Hans Lobert; Fred Luderus; Milt Reed; Jimmy Walsh | Outfielders: Beals Becker; Ralph Capron; Gavvy Cravath; Josh Devore; Cozy Dolan; Vern Duncan; Sherry Magee; Doc Miller; Dode Paskert; Other batters: Pat Moran | Manager: Red Dooin |

== Player stats ==
=== Batting ===
==== Starters by position ====
Note: Pos = Position; G = Games played; AB = At bats; H = Hits; Avg. = Batting average; HR = Home runs; RBI = Runs batted in

| Pos | Player | G | AB | H | Avg. | HR | RBI |
|---|---|---|---|---|---|---|---|
| C | Bill Killefer | 120 | 360 | 88 | .244 | 0 | 24 |
| 1B | Fred Luderus | 155 | 588 | 154 | .262 | 18 | 86 |
| 2B | Otto Knabe | 148 | 571 | 150 | .263 | 2 | 53 |
| SS | Mickey Doolin | 151 | 518 | 113 | .218 | 1 | 43 |
| 3B | Hans Lobert | 150 | 573 | 172 | .300 | 7 | 55 |
| OF | Sherry Magee | 138 | 470 | 144 | .306 | 11 | 70 |
| OF | Dode Paskert | 124 | 454 | 119 | .262 | 4 | 29 |
| OF | Gavvy Cravath | 147 | 525 | 179 | .341 | 19 | 128 |

==== Other batters ====
Note: G = Games played; AB = At bats; H = Hits; Avg. = Batting average; HR = Home runs; RBI = Runs batted in

| Player | G | AB | H | Avg. | HR | RBI |
|---|---|---|---|---|---|---|
| Beals Becker | 88 | 306 | 99 | .324 | 9 | 44 |
| Red Dooin | 55 | 129 | 33 | .256 | 0 | 13 |
| Cozy Dolan | 55 | 126 | 33 | .262 | 0 | 8 |
| Doc Miller | 69 | 87 | 30 | .345 | 0 | 11 |
| Bobby Byrne | 19 | 58 | 13 | .224 | 1 | 4 |
| Josh Devore | 23 | 39 | 11 | .282 | 0 | 5 |
| Dan Howley | 26 | 32 | 4 | .125 | 0 | 2 |
| Jimmy Walsh | 26 | 30 | 10 | .333 | 0 | 5 |
| Ed Burns | 17 | 30 | 6 | .200 | 0 | 3 |
| Milt Reed | 13 | 24 | 6 | .250 | 0 | 0 |
| Vern Duncan | 8 | 12 | 5 | .417 | 0 | 1 |
| John Dodge | 3 | 3 | 1 | .333 | 0 | 0 |
| Pat Moran | 1 | 1 | 0 | .000 | 0 | 0 |
| Ralph Capron | 1 | 1 | 0 | .000 | 0 | 0 |

=== Pitching ===
==== Starting pitchers ====
Note: G = Games pitched; IP = Innings pitched; W = Wins; L = Losses; ERA = Earned run average; SO = Strikeouts

| Player | G | IP | W | L | ERA | SO |
|---|---|---|---|---|---|---|
| Tom Seaton | 52 | 322.1 | 27 | 12 | 2.60 | 168 |
| Pete Alexander | 47 | 306.1 | 22 | 8 | 2.79 | 159 |

==== Other pitchers ====
Note: G = Games pitched; IP = Innings pitched; W = Wins; L = Losses; ERA = Earned run average; SO = Strikeouts

| Player | G | IP | W | L | ERA | SO |
|---|---|---|---|---|---|---|
| Ad Brennan | 40 | 207.0 | 14 | 12 | 2.39 | 94 |
| Erskine Mayer | 39 | 170.2 | 9 | 9 | 3.11 | 51 |
| Eppa Rixey | 35 | 155.2 | 9 | 5 | 3.12 | 75 |
| George Chalmers | 26 | 116.0 | 3 | 10 | 4.81 | 18 |
| Earl Moore | 12 | 52.0 | 1 | 3 | 5.02 | 24 |
| Howie Camnitz | 9 | 49.0 | 3 | 3 | 3.67 | 21 |

==== Relief pitchers ====
Note: G = Games pitched; W = Wins; L = Losses; SV = Saves; ERA = Earned run average; SO = Strikeouts

| Player | G | W | L | SV | ERA | SO |
|---|---|---|---|---|---|---|
| Rube Marshall | 14 | 0 | 1 | 1 | 4.57 | 18 |
| Doc Imlay | 9 | 0 | 0 | 0 | 7.24 | 7 |
| Happy Finneran | 3 | 0 | 0 | 0 | 7.20 | 0 |
| Red Nelson | 2 | 0 | 0 | 0 | 2.16 | 3 |
| Jim Haislip | 1 | 0 | 0 | 0 | 6.00 | 0 |
| Ray Hartranft | 1 | 0 | 0 | 0 | 9.00 | 1 |

== Post-season ==
In a postseason exhibition game against the Chicago Leland Giants, Cyclone Joe Williams defeated Grover Cleveland Alexander and the Phillies.
