= List of Major League Baseball players (I) =

The following is a list of Major League Baseball players, retired or active. As of the end of the 2011 season, there have been 53 players with a last name that begins with I who have been on a major league roster at one point.

== I ==
Name	Debut	Final game	Position	Teams	Ref
Chris Iannetta	August 27, 2006		Catcher	Colorado Rockies	
Raúl Ibañez	August 1, 1996	September 28, 2014	Left fielder	Seattle Mariners, Kansas City Royals, Philadelphia Phillies	
Ham Iburg	April 17, 1902	October 3, 1902	Pitcher	Philadelphia Phillies	
Ryota Igarashi	April 8, 2010		Pitcher	New York Mets	
Kei Igawa	April 7, 2007		Pitcher	New York Yankees	
José Iglesias	May 8, 2011		Shortstop	Boston Red Sox	
Gary Ignasiak	September 20, 1973	September 29, 1973	Pitcher	Detroit Tigers	
Mike Ignasiak	August 22, 1991	August 21, 1995	Pitcher	Milwaukee Brewers	
Tadahito Iguchi	April 4, 2005	September 28, 2008	Second baseman	Chicago White Sox, Philadelphia Phillies, San Diego Padres	
Blaise Ilsley	April 4, 1994	July 7, 1994	Pitcher	Chicago Cubs	
Doc Imlay	July 7, 1913	September 27, 1913	Pitcher	Philadelphia Phillies	
Pete Incaviglia	April 8, 1986	September 27, 1998	Left fielder	Texas Rangers, Detroit Tigers, Houston Astros, Philadelphia Phillies, Baltimore Orioles, New York Yankees	
Alexis Infante	September 27, 1987	July 15, 1990	Infielder	Toronto Blue Jays, Atlanta Braves	
Gregory Infante	September 7, 2010		Pitcher	Chicago White Sox	
Omar Infante	September 7, 2002		Utility player	Detroit Tigers, Atlanta Braves, Florida Marlins	
Brandon Inge	April 3, 2001		Third baseman	Detroit Tigers	
Bob Ingersoll	April 23, 1914	June 2, 1914	Pitcher	Cincinnati Reds	
Scotty Ingerton	April 12, 1911	October 9, 1911	Third baseman/Left fielder	Boston Braves	
Joe Inglett	June 21, 2006		Second baseman/Outfielder	Cleveland Indians, Toronto Blue Jays, Milwaukee Brewers, Houston Astros	
Charlie Ingraham	July 4, 1883	July 4, 1883	Catcher	Baltimore Orioles (AA)	
Garey Ingram	May 15, 1994	September 28, 1997	Second baseman	Los Angeles Dodgers	
Mel Ingram	July 24, 1929	August 28, 1929	Pinch hitter	Pittsburgh Pirates	
Riccardo Ingram	June 26, 1994	July 30, 1995	Left fielder	Detroit Tigers, Minnesota Twins	
Bert Inks	September 2, 1891	June 23, 1896	Pitcher	Brooklyn Grooms, Washington Statesmen, Baltimore Orioles (AA), Louisville Colonels, Philadelphia Phillies, Cincinnati Reds	
Jeff Innis	May 16, 1987	October 2, 1993	Pitcher	New York Mets	
Dane Iorg	April 9, 1977	October 4, 1986	Outfielder	Philadelphia Phillies, St. Louis Cardinals, Kansas City Royals, San Diego Padres	
Garth Iorg	April 9, 1978	October 4, 1987	Third baseman	Toronto Blue Jays	
Happy Iott	September 16, 1903	September 18, 1903	Center fielder	Cleveland Naps	
Hooks Iott	September 6, 1941	September 23, 1947	Pitcher	St. Louis Browns, New York Giants	
Hideki Irabu	July 10, 1997	July 12, 2002	Pitcher	New York Yankees, Montreal Expos, Texas Rangers	
Hal Irelan	April 23, 1914	October 6, 1914	Second baseman	Philadelphia Phillies	
Tim Ireland	September 20, 1981	May 25, 1982	Infielder	Kansas City Royals	
Hernán Iribarren	April 12, 2008		Second baseman	Milwaukee Brewers	
Ed Irvin	May 18, 1912	May 18, 1912	Third baseman	Detroit Tigers	
Monte Irvin	July 8, 1949	September 30, 1956	Left fielder	New York Giants, Chicago Cubs	
Daryl Irvine	April 28, 1990	September 28, 1992	Pitcher	Boston Red Sox	
Arthur Irwin	May 1, 1880	June 22, 1894	Shortstop	Worcester Ruby Legs, Providence Grays, Philadelphia Quakers, Washington Nationals (1886–1889), Boston Reds (1890–1891)	
Bill Irwin	August 30, 1886	October 7, 1886	Pitcher	Cincinnati Red Stockings	
Charlie Irwin	September 3, 1893	October 3, 1902	Third baseman	Chicago Colts, Cincinnati Reds, Brooklyn Superbas	
John Irwin	May 31, 1882	August 8, 1896	Third baseman	Worcester Ruby Legs, Boston Reds (1884), Philadelphia Athletics (AA), Washington Nationals (1886–1889), Buffalo Bisons (PL), Boston Reds (1890–1891), Louisville Colonels	
Tommy Irwin	October 1, 1938	October 2, 1938	Shortstop	Cleveland Indians	
Walt Irwin	April 24, 1921	May 12, 1921	Pinch hitter	St. Louis Cardinals	
Orlando Isales	September 11, 1980	October 5, 1980	Right fielder	Philadelphia Phillies	
Frank Isbell	May 1, 1898	October 3, 1909	First baseman	Chicago Orphans, Chicago White Sox	
Kazuhisa Ishii	April 6, 2002	September 28, 2005	Pitcher	Los Angeles Dodgers, New York Mets	
Travis Ishikawa	April 18, 2006		First baseman	San Francisco Giants	
Jason Isringhausen	July 17, 1995		Pitcher	New York Mets, Oakland Athletics, St. Louis Cardinals, Tampa Bay Rays	
Mike Ivie	September 4, 1971	May 7, 1983	First baseman	San Diego Padres, San Francisco Giants, Houston Astros, Detroit Tigers	
Akinori Iwamura	April 2, 2007		Second baseman	Tampa Bay Rays, Pittsburgh Pirates, Oakland Athletics	
Hank Izquierdo	August 9, 1967	September 27, 1967	Catcher	Minnesota Twins	
Hansel Izquierdo	April 21, 2002	June 24, 2002	Pitcher	Florida Marlins	
César Izturis	June 23, 2001		Shortstop	Toronto Blue Jays, Los Angeles Dodgers, Chicago Cubs, Pittsburgh Pirates, St. Louis Cardinals, Baltimore Orioles	
Maicer Izturis	August 27, 2004		Infielder	Montreal Expos, Los Angeles Angels of Anaheim	
