= Conzelman =

Conzelman is a surname. Notable people with the surname include:

- Jimmy Conzelman (1898–1970), American football player and coach, baseball executive, and advertising executive
- Joe Conzelman (1889–1979), American baseball player

== See also ==
- Conzelmann
