= 1913 Chicago Cubs season =

1913 Chicago Cubs
- League: National League
- Ballpark: West Side Park
- City: Chicago
- Record: 88–65 (.575)
- League place: 3rd
- Owners: Charles Murphy
- Managers: Johnny Evers

The 1913 Chicago Cubs season was the 42nd season of the Chicago Cubs franchise, the 38th in the National League and the 21st at West Side Park. The Cubs finished third in the National League with a record of 88–65.

== Offseason ==
- December 15, 1912: Joe Tinker, Grover Lowdermilk and Harry Chapman were traded by the Cubs to the Cincinnati Reds for Red Corriden, Bert Humphries, Pete Knisely, Mike Mitchell and Art Phelan.

== Regular season ==
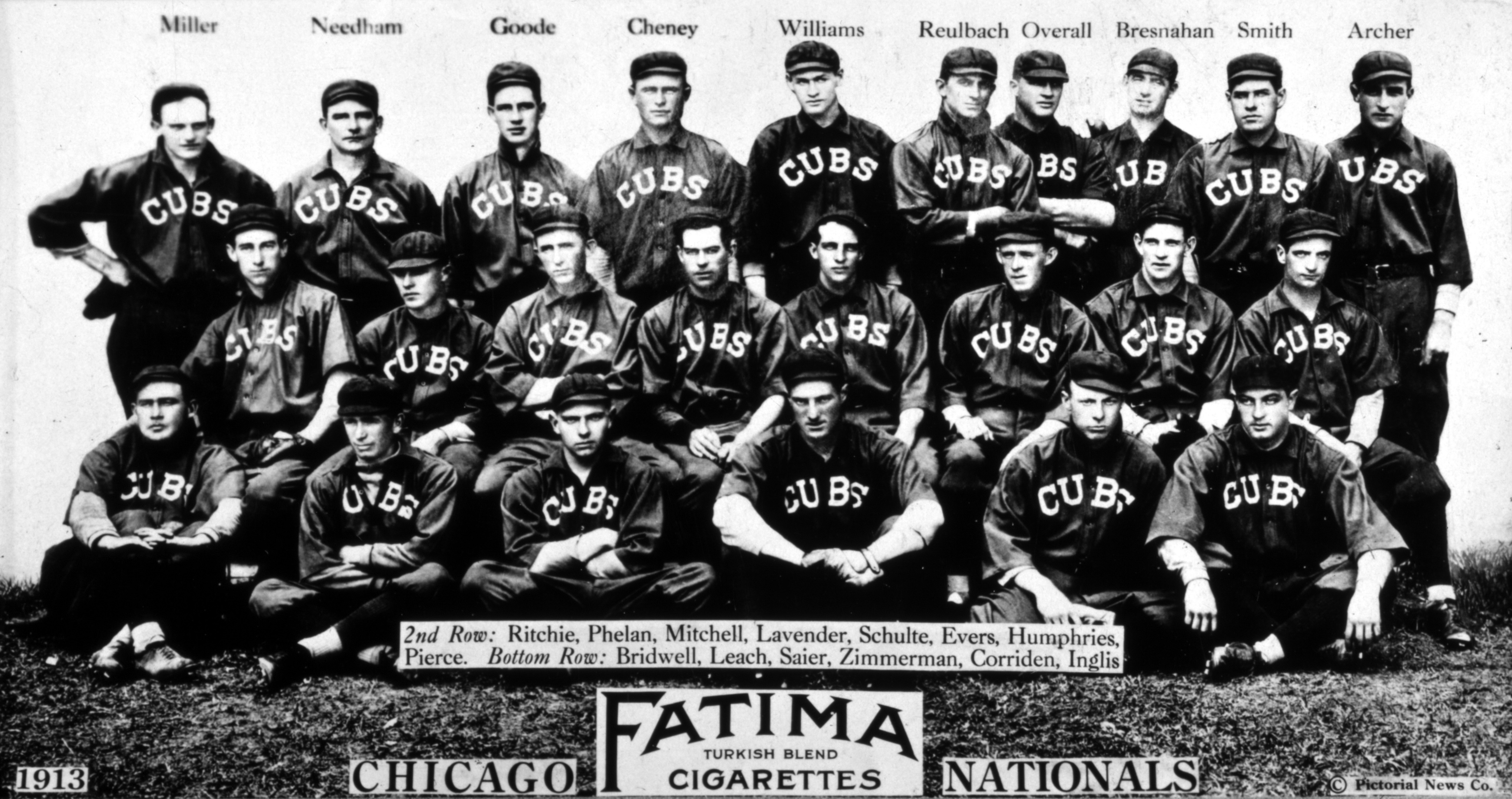

=== Season standings ===
National League
Team	W	L	Pct.	GB	Home	Road
New York Giants	101	51	.664	—	54‍–‍23	47‍–‍28
Philadelphia Phillies	88	63	.583	12½	43‍–‍33	45‍–‍30
Chicago Cubs	88	65	.575	13½	51‍–‍25	37‍–‍40
Pittsburgh Pirates	78	71	.523	21½	41‍–‍35	37‍–‍36
Boston Braves	69	82	.457	31½	34‍–‍40	35‍–‍42
Brooklyn Dodgers	65	84	.436	34½	29‍–‍47	36‍–‍37
Cincinnati Reds	64	89	.418	37½	32‍–‍44	32‍–‍45
St. Louis Cardinals	51	99	.340	49	25‍–‍48	26‍–‍51

=== Record vs. opponents ===
1913 National League record Sources:
Team	BSN	BRO	CHC	CIN	NYG	PHI	PIT	STL
Boston	—	10–10–1	9–13	8–14	8–14	7–15–1	11–10	16–6–1
Brooklyn	10–10–1	—	9–13	9–13	8–14	8–13–1	8–14–1	13–7
Chicago	13–9	13–9	—	13–9–1	7–14	13–9	13–9	16–6–1
Cincinnati	14–8	13–9	9–13–1	—	5–17	5–17–1	8–13–1	10–12
New York	14–8	14–8	14–7	17–5	—	14–8–3	14–8–1	14–7
Philadelphia	15–7–1	13–8–1	9–13	17–5–1	8–14–3	—	9–11–2	17–5
Pittsburgh	10–11	14–8–1	9–13	13–8–1	8–14–1	11–9–2	—	13–8–1
St. Louis	6–16–1	7–13	6–16–1	12–10	7–14	5–17	8–13–1	—

== Roster ==
1913 Chicago Cubs
Roster
Pitchers: Larry Cheney; Bert Humphries; Jimmy Lavender; Lefty Leifield; Earl Moore; Orval Overall; George Pierce; Ed Reulbach; Lew Richie; Charlie Smith; Eddie Stack; Fred Toney; Hippo Vaughn; Doc Watson; Zip Zabel	Catchers: Jimmy Archer; Roger Bresnahan; Bubbles Hargrave; Tom Needham; Infielders: Al Bridwell; Red Corriden; Johnny Evers; Chick Keating; Fritz Mollwitz; Art Phelan; Vic Saier; Heinie Zimmerman	Outfielders: Milo Allison; Otis Clymer; Wilbur Good; Tommy Leach; Ward Miller; Mike Mitchell; Wildfire Schulte; Tuffy Stewart; Cy Williams; Other batters: Mike Hechinger; Pete Knisely; Ed McDonald	Manager: Johnny Evers

== Player stats ==
=== Batting ===
==== Starters by position ====
Note: Pos = Position; G = Games played; AB = At bats; H = Hits; Avg. = Batting average; HR = Home runs; RBI = Runs batted in

Pos	Player	G	AB	H	Avg.	HR	RBI
C	Jimmy Archer	111	368	98	.266	2	44
1B	Vic Saier	149	519	150	.289	14	92
2B	Johnny Evers	136	446	127	.285	3	49
SS	Al Bridwell	136	405	97	.240	1	37
3B	Heinie Zimmerman	127	447	140	.313	9	95
OF	Tommy Leach	131	456	131	.287	6	32
OF	Frank Schulte	132	497	138	.278	9	68
OF	Mike Mitchell	82	279	73	.262	4	35

==== Other batters ====
Note: G = Games played; AB = At bats; H = Hits; Avg. = Batting average; HR = Home runs; RBI = Runs batted in

Player	G	AB	H	Avg.	HR	RBI
Art Phelan	91	261	65	.249	2	35
Ward Miller	80	203	48	.236	1	16
Roger Bresnahan	69	162	37	.228	1	21
Cy Williams	49	156	35	.224	4	32
Otis Clymer	30	105	24	.229	0	7
Red Corriden	46	97	17	.175	2	9
Wilbur Good	49	91	23	.253	1	12
Tom Needham	20	42	10	.238	0	11
Tuffy Stewart	9	8	1	.125	0	2
Fritz Mollwitz	2	7	3	.429	0	0
Milo Allison	2	6	2	.333	0	0
Chick Keating	2	5	1	.200	0	0
Bubbles Hargrave	3	3	1	.333	0	1
Pete Knisely	2	2	0	.000	0	0
Mike Hechinger	2	2	0	.000	0	0
Ed McDonald	1	0	0	----	0	0

=== Pitching ===
==== Starting pitchers ====
Note: G = Games pitched; IP = Innings pitched; W = Wins; L = Losses; ERA = Earned run average; SO = Strikeouts

Player	G	IP	W	L	ERA	SO
Larry Cheney	54	305.0	21	14	2.57	136
Bert Humphries	28	181.0	16	4	2.69	81
George Pierce	25	164.0	13	5	2.30	73
Charlie Smith	20	137.2	7	9	2.55	47
Orval Overall	11	68.0	4	5	3.84	30
Hippo Vaughn	7	56.0	5	1	1.45	36
Doc Watson	1	9.0	1	0	1.00	1
Zip Zabel	1	5.0	1	0	0.00	0

==== Other pitchers ====
Note: G = Games pitched; IP = Innings pitched; W = Wins; L = Losses; ERA = Earned run average; SO = Strikeouts

Player	G	IP	W	L	ERA	SO
Jimmy Lavender	40	204.0	10	14	3.66	91
Lew Richie	16	65.0	2	4	5.82	15
Eddie Stack	11	51.0	4	2	4.24	28
Fred Toney	7	39.0	2	2	6.00	12
Ed Reulbach	10	38.2	1	3	4.42	10
Earl Moore	7	28.1	1	1	4.45	12
Lefty Leifield	6	21.1	0	1	5.48	4
