= John Ferry =

John Ferry may refer to:

- John D. Ferry, Canadian-born American chemist and biochemist
- Jack Ferry, pitcher in Major League Baseball
