= Andy Harrington =

Andy Harrington may refer to:

- Andy Harrington (pitcher) (1888–1938), professional baseball pitcher
- Andy Harrington (pinch hitter) (1903–1979), American Major League Baseball player
