= Charlie Schmutz =

American baseball player (1891-1962)

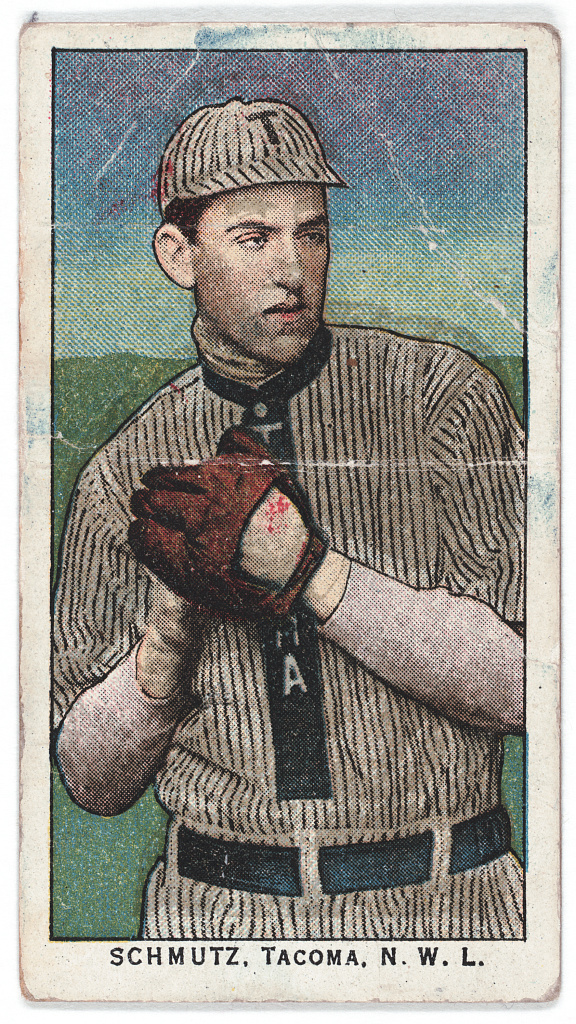
- Pitcher
- Born: January 1, 1891; San Diego, California, U.S.
- Died: June 27, 1962 (aged 71); Seattle, Washington, U.S.
- Batted: Right Threw: Right

MLB debut
- May 13, 1914, for the Brooklyn Robins

Last MLB appearance
- April 14, 1915, for the Brooklyn Robins

MLB statistics
- Win–loss record: 1-3
- Earned run average: 3.52
- Strikeouts: 22
- Stats at Baseball Reference

Teams
- Brooklyn Robins (1914–1915)

Charles Otto Schmutz (January 1, 1891 in San Diego, California – June 27, 1962 in Seattle, Washington) nicknamed "King", was an American pitcher in Major League Baseball. He pitched for the 1914–1915 Brooklyn Robins.

While pitching for the Northwestern League Vancouver Beavers, he was known as a "spitball artist, and one of the best in the league".
