= Johnny Enzmann =

American baseball player (1890–1984)

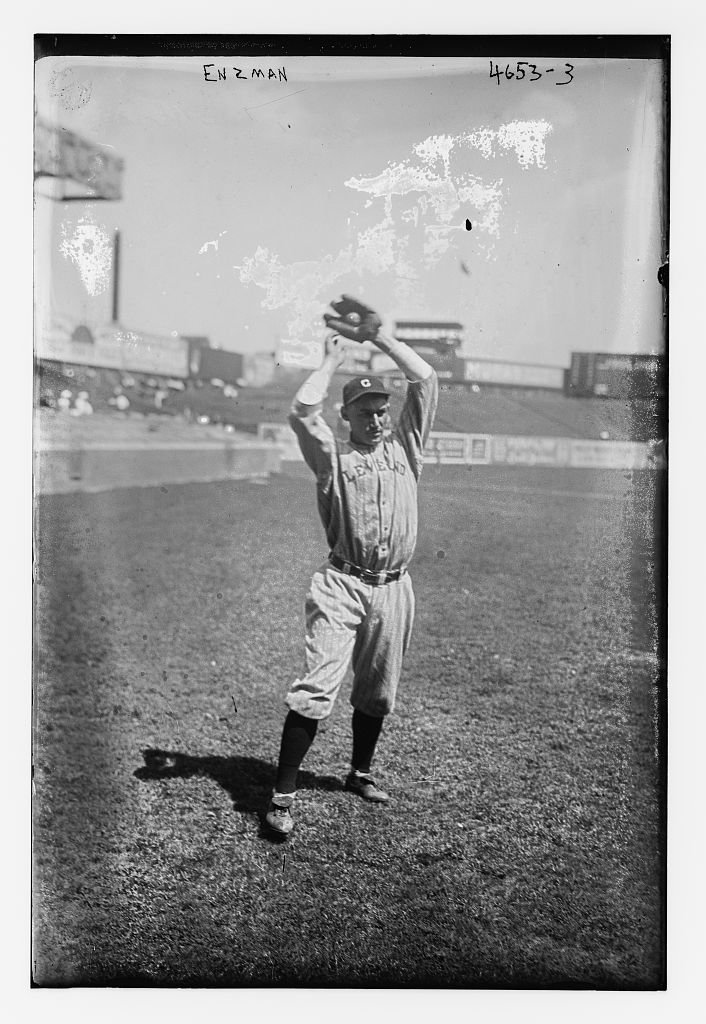
- Pitcher
- Born: March 4, 1890; Brooklyn, New York, U.S.
- Died: March 14, 1984 (aged 94); Riverhead, New York, U.S.
- Batted: Right Threw: Right

MLB debut
- July 10, 1914, for the Brooklyn Robins

Last MLB appearance
- October 2, 1920, for the Philadelphia Phillies

MLB statistics
- Win–loss record: 11-12
- Earned run average: 2.84
- Strikeouts: 91
- Stats at Baseball Reference

Teams
- Brooklyn Robins (1914); Cleveland Indians (1918–1919); Philadelphia Phillies (1920)

John "Gentleman John" Enzmann (March 4, 1890 – March 14, 1984) was an American pitcher in Major League Baseball.

== Biography ==
He pitched for the 1914 Brooklyn Robins, the 1918–1919 Cleveland Indians and the 1920 Philadelphia Phillies. Following his baseball career, Enzmann worked as toolmaker from which he retired in 1972.

The Phillies celebrated the franchise's centennial in 1983 and identified Enzmann as the team's then-living oldest player. Enzmann was 93 years old and living in Ft. Lauderdale. As part of celebrations on May 1, 1983, Enzmann threw out the ceremonial first pitch prior to the Phillies game against the Houston Astros at Veterans Stadium.
