= Dick Robertson (baseball) =

American baseball player (1891–1944)

- Pitcher
- Born: September 16, 1891; Rockville, Maryland, U.S.
- Died: October 2, 1944 (aged 53); New Orleans, Louisiana, U.S.
- Batted: Right Threw: Right

MLB debut
- September 16, 1913, for the Cincinnati Reds

Last MLB appearance
- June 20, 1919, for the Washington Senators

MLB statistics
- Win–loss record: 3–8
- Earned run average: 2.89
- Strikeouts: 26
- Stats at Baseball Reference

Teams
- Cincinnati Reds (1913); Brooklyn Robins (1918); Washington Senators (1919)

Preston James Robertson (September 16, 1891 – October 2, 1944) was an American pitcher in Major League Baseball. He pitched in two games for the Cincinnati Reds in 1913, thirteen games for the 1918 Brooklyn Robins and seven games for the 1919 Washington Senators.
