= Bill Hall (pitcher) =

American baseball player (1894-1947)

- Pitcher
- Born: February 22, 1894; Charleston, West Virginia
- Died: August 15, 1947 (aged 53); Newport, Kentucky
- Batted: Right Threw: Right

MLB debut
- July 4, 1913, for the Brooklyn Superbas

Last MLB appearance
- July 18, 1913, for the Brooklyn Superbas

MLB statistics
- Win–loss record: 0-0
- Earned run average: 5.79
- Strikeouts: 3
- Stats at Baseball Reference

Teams
- Brooklyn Superbas (1913)

William Bernard Hall (February 22, 1894 in Charleston, West Virginia – August 15, 1947 in Newport, Kentucky) was a pitcher in Major League Baseball. He pitched in three games for the 1913 Brooklyn Dodgers.
