= John Scheneberg =

American baseball player (1887–1950)

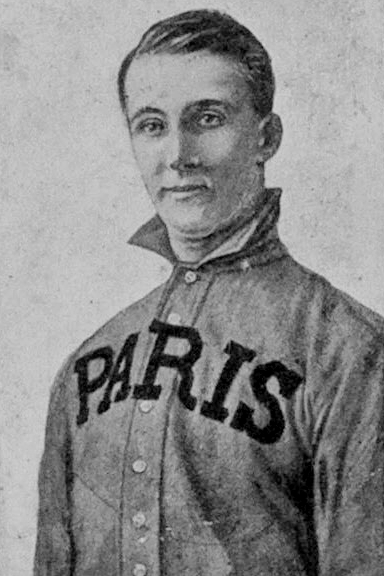
- Pitcher
- Born: November 20, 1887; Guyandotte, West Virginia, U.S.
- Died: September 26, 1950 (aged 62); Huntington, West Virginia, U.S.
- Batted: Both Threw: Right

MLB debut
- September 23, 1913, for the Pittsburgh Pirates

Last MLB appearance
- September 24, 1920, for the St. Louis Browns

MLB statistics
- Games played: 2
- Innings pitched: 8
- Earned run average: 11.25
- Stats at Baseball Reference

Teams
- Pittsburgh Pirates (1913); St. Louis Browns (1920)

John Bluford Scheneberg (November 20, 1887 – September 26, 1950) was an American pitcher in Major League Baseball. He played for the Pittsburgh Pirates and St. Louis Browns.
