= William H. Locke =

American baseball executive (1869–1913)

William Henry Locke (August 27, 1869 – August 14, 1913) was an American baseball executive who served as president of the Philadelphia Phillies in 1913.

A native of Pittsburgh, Locke's father was the editor of The Pittsburgh Press. Locke joined the paper in 1893 and soon became its sports editor. In 1903 he succeeded Harry Pulliam as the secretary of the Pittsburgh Pirates. He was a driving force behind the construction of Forbes Field and was credited with ousting ticket scalpers from the city. In 1911, he attempted to purchase the Boston Braves from William Hepburn Russell, but the deal fell apart when Russell refused to give Locke controlling interest.

In January 1913, Locke and his cousin, former New York City Police Commissioner William Baker, led a group that purchased the Philadelphia Phillies. On August 14, 1913, Locke died in Ventnor, New Jersey after a long illness.
