= George Cutshaw =

American baseball player (1886–1973)

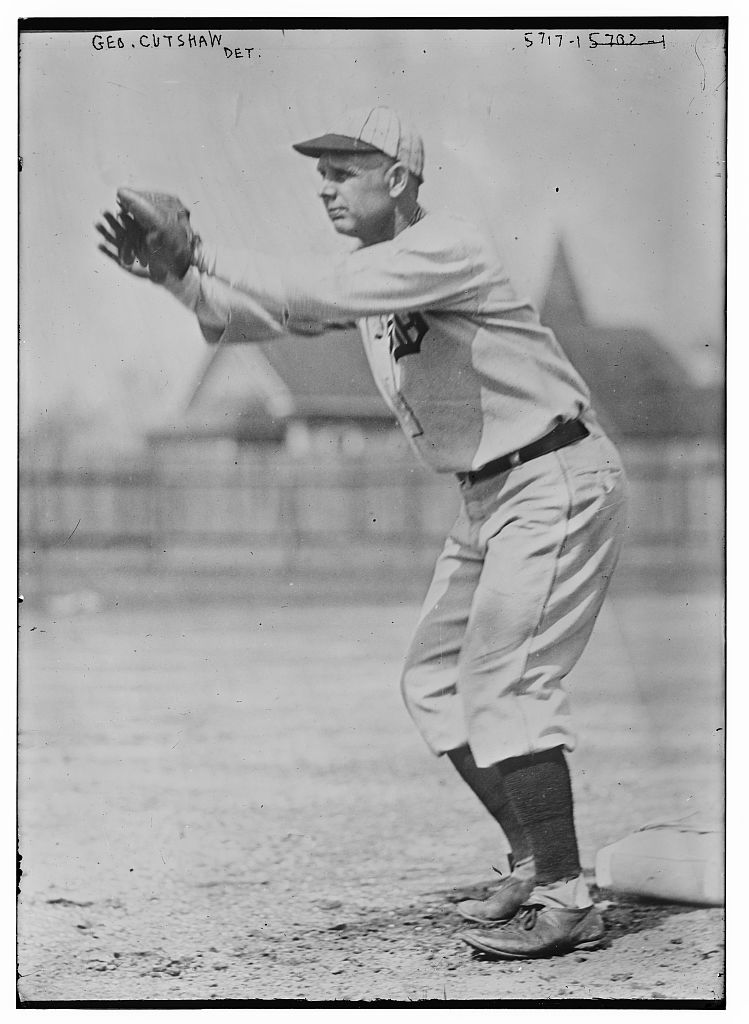
- George Cutshaw, 1922
- Second baseman
- Born: July 29, 1886; Wilmington, Illinois, U.S.
- Died: August 22, 1973 (aged 87); San Diego, California, U.S.
- Batted: Right Threw: Right

MLB debut
- April 25, 1912, for the Brooklyn Dodgers

Last MLB appearance
- July 5, 1923, for the Detroit Tigers

MLB statistics
- Batting average: .265
- Home runs: 25
- Runs batted in: 653
- Stats at Baseball Reference

Teams
- Brooklyn Dodgers / Robins (1912–1917); Pittsburgh Pirates (1918–1921); Detroit Tigers (1922–1923)

George William Cutshaw (July 29, 1886 – August 22, 1973), nicknamed "Clancy", was an American professional baseball second baseman. He played twelve seasons in Major League Baseball (MLB) from 1912 to 1923 for the Brooklyn Dodgers/Robins, Pittsburgh Pirates, and Detroit Tigers.

In 1,516 games over 12 seasons, Cutshaw posted a .265 batting average (1,487-for-5,621) with 629 runs, 195 doubles, 89 triples, 25 home runs, 653 RBI, 271 stolen bases, 300 bases on balls, .305 on-base percentage and .344 slugging percentage. He finished his career with a .965 fielding percentage as a second baseman. In the 1916 World Series, he hit .105 (2-for-19) with 2 runs and 2 RBI.

== See also ==
- List of Major League Baseball single-game hits leaders
