= Doc Imlay =

American baseball player (1889-1948)

- Pitcher
- Born: January 12, 1889; Allentown, New Jersey
- Died: October 7, 1948 (aged 59); Bordentown, New Jersey
- Batted: Right Threw: Right

MLB debut
- July 7, 1913, for the Philadelphia Phillies

Last MLB appearance
- September 27, 1913, for the Philadelphia Phillies

MLB statistics
- Win–loss record: 0–0
- Earned run average: 7.24
- Strikeouts: 7
- Stats at Baseball Reference

Teams
- Philadelphia Phillies (1913)

Harry Miller "Doc" Imlay (January 12, 1889 – October 7, 1948) was a Major League Baseball pitcher who appeared in nine games for the Philadelphia Phillies in its 1913 season.
