= Al Cabrera =

Spanish baseball player (1881–1964)

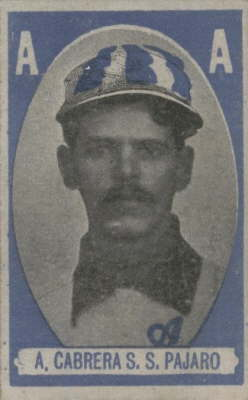
- Shortstop
- Born: May 11, 1881; Canary Islands, Kingdom of Spain
- Died: 1964; Batabanó, Cuba
- Batted: Right Threw: Right

MLB debut
- May 16, 1913, for the St. Louis Cardinals

Last MLB appearance
- May 16, 1913, for the St. Louis Cardinals

MLB statistics
- Games played: 1
- At bats: 2
- Stats at Baseball Reference

Teams
- St. Louis Cardinals (1913)

Member of the Cuban

Baseball Hall of Fame
- Induction: 1942

Alfredo A. Cabrera (May 11, 1881 – 1964) was a Spanish professional baseball shortstop who played many years in the Cuban League. His nickname was Pájaro, which is Spanish for "Bird."

Cabrera's career is particularly noteworthy because he became the first Spanish-born major leaguer and the first from the continent of Africa when he made his Major League Baseball debut for the St. Louis Cardinals on May 16, 1913. He was hitless in two at-bats and never played in another MLB game.

Cabrera played in the Cuban League from 1901 to 1920 and was elected to the Cuban Baseball Hall of Fame in 1942. He also managed in the Cuban League and won a championship in the winter of 1915—16 as manager of the Almendares club.

Born in the Canary Islands, a Spanish archipelago in Africa, he died in 1964 in Batabanó, Cuba.
