= William Baker (baseball) =

American baseball owner (1866–1930)

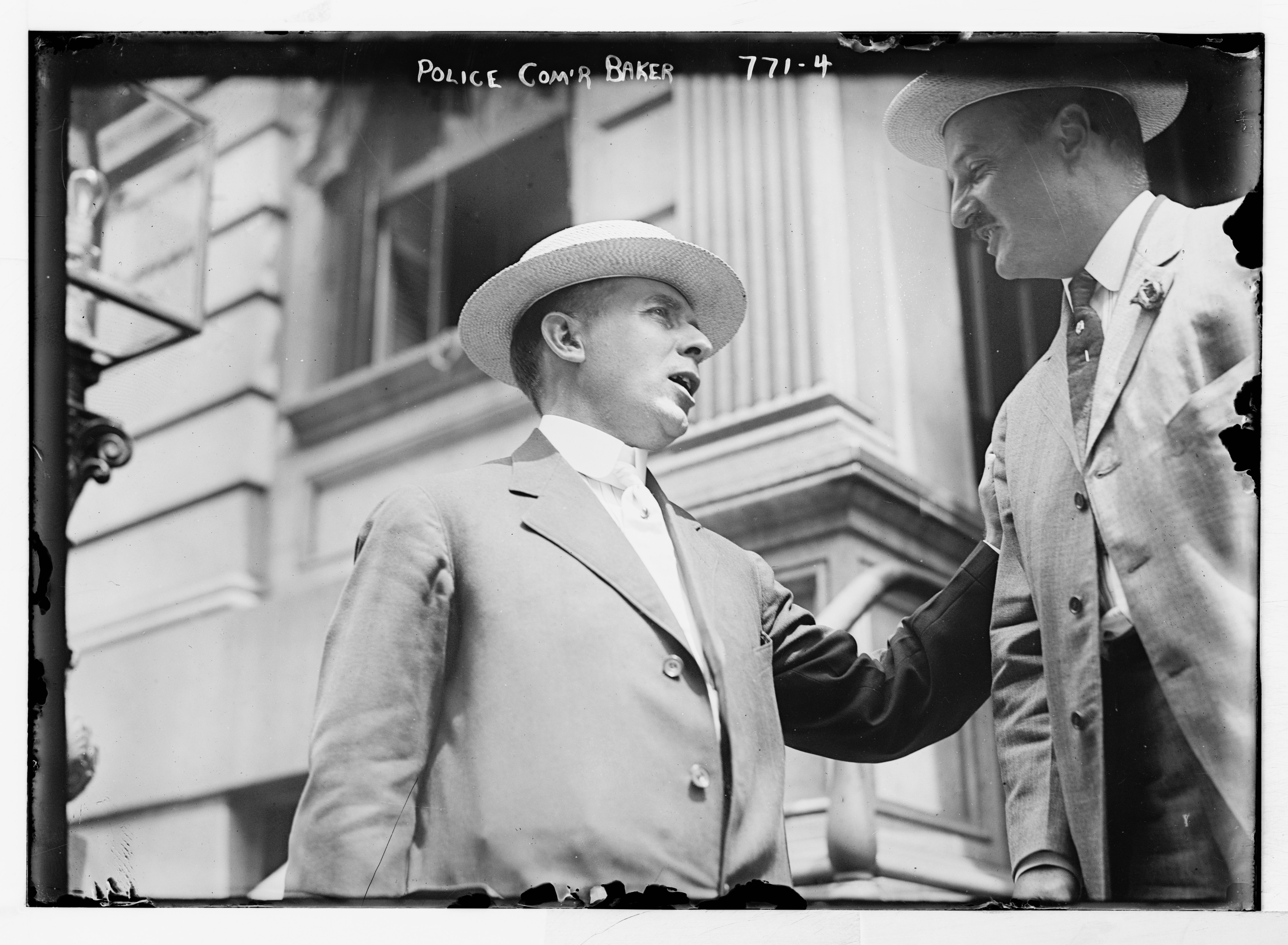

6th New York City Police Commissioner
- In office July 1, 1909 – October 20, 1910
- Appointed by: William Jay Gaynor
- Preceded by: Theodore A. Bingham
- Succeeded by: James Church Cropsey

Personal details
- Born: 1866 Pittsburgh, Pennsylvania, U.S.
- Died: December 4, 1930 Montreal, Quebec, Canada

William Frazer Baker (1866 – December 4, 1930) was the owner of the Philadelphia Phillies of the National League from 1913 through 1930 and New York City Police Commissioner from 1909 to 1910.

== Early life ==
Baker was born in Pittsburgh in 1866. After leaving school he went to work for the Cleveland and Pittsburgh Railroad as a messenger boy. In 1885 he moved to Bedford–Stuyvesant, Brooklyn, where he worked as a secretary to industrialist William P. Shinn, worked in the railroad and oil businesses, and was in the contracting business with his brother, and was a clerk for the W. N. Coler & Co. banking house.

== Government service ==
In 1898, Baker was hired as a secretary to New York City Comptroller Bird Sim Coler. Baker was active in Coler's 1902 gubernatorial campaign. Following Coler's loss, Baker went to work on Wall Street. In 1905, Baker returned to government service as a member of the New York City Civil Service Commission. He was made president of the board the following year. In 1908, Baker switched jobs with first deputy police commissioner Arthur J. O'Keeffe. He was in charge of Brooklyn and Queens until 1909 when he was transferred to police headquarters and placed in charge of the bureau of repairs and supplies.

On July 1, 1909, Mayor George B. McClellan, Jr. fired police commissioner Theodore A. Bingham and promoted Baker to succeed him. During his brief tenure, he was accused of interfering in gambling investigations. Baker was one of two department heads retained by McClellan's successor William Jay Gaynor. He resigned from his position on October 20, 1910.

== Philadelphia Phillies owner ==
In 1911, Baker joined Warren M. Lincoln & Co., a hatmaking business.

In January 1913, Baker was part of a group led by his cousin, William H. Locke, that purchased the Philadelphia Phillies. Baker was elected team president in October 1913, following the death of Locke earlier in the year. He was at the helm two years later when the Phillies played in the 1915 World Series.

Baker was known for being extremely short sighted and tight-fisted. For most of his tenure as the Phillies' owner, the team had only one scout, and used a flock of sheep to trim the grass at their ballpark, mockingly nicknamed "Baker Bowl" by the press in 1923.

Baker was so cheap that he sold star pitcher Grover Cleveland Alexander and catcher Bill Killefer to the Chicago Cubs in 1917 rather than increase their salary. Within a year, the Phillies had crumbled to sixth place—the first of 14 straight seasons (and 30 of the next 31) without a winning record and Alexander and Killefer led the Cubs to the pennant.

Baker died of a heart attack on December 4, 1930 while attending a league meeting in Montreal and was succeeded as Phillies owner by Gerald Nugent.

Police appointments
Preceded by Theodore A. Bingham	NYPD Commissioner; 1909–1910	Succeeded by James Cropsey
