= Leo Callahan =

American baseball player (1890-1982)

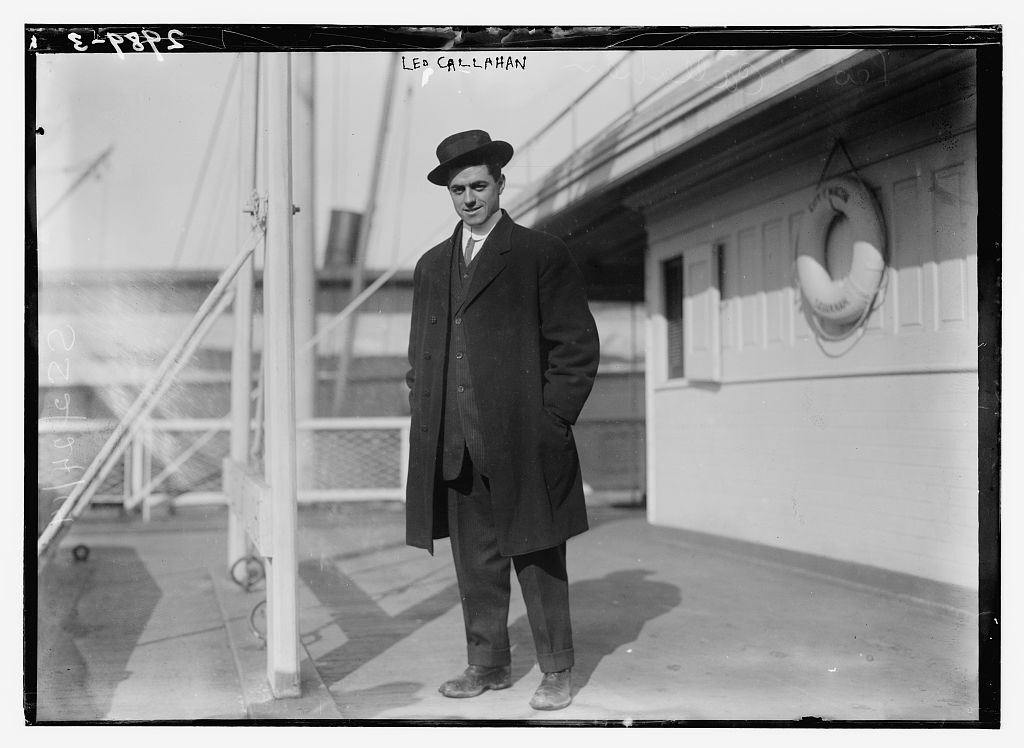
- Outfielder
- Born: August 9, 1890; Jamaica Plain, Massachusetts, U.S.
- Died: May 2, 1982 (aged 91); Erie, Pennsylvania, U.S.
- Batted: Left Threw: Left

MLB debut
- April 9, 1913, for the Brooklyn Dodgers

Last MLB appearance
- September 28, 1919, for the Philadelphia Phillies

MLB statistics
- Batting average: .221
- Home runs: 1
- Runs batted in: 12
- Stats at Baseball Reference

Teams
- Brooklyn Dodgers (1913); Philadelphia Phillies (1919)

Leo David Callahan (August 9, 1890 – May 2, 1982) was an American professional baseball player who played outfield for the 1913 Brooklyn Dodgers and the 1919 Philadelphia Phillies.
