= Ed Burns (baseball) =

American baseball player (1887–1942)

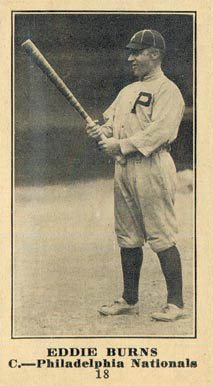
- Catcher
- Born: Edward James Burns; October 31, 1887; San Francisco, California, U.S.
- Died: June 1, 1942 (aged 54); Monterey, California, U.S.
- Batted: Right Threw: Right

MLB debut
- June 25, 1912, for the St. Louis Cardinals

Last MLB appearance
- July 17, 1918, for the Philadelphia Phillies

MLB statistics
- Batting average: .230
- Home runs: 0
- Runs batted in: 65
- Stats at Baseball Reference

Teams
- St. Louis Cardinals (1912); Philadelphia Phillies (1913–18)

Edward James Burns (October 31, 1887 – June 1, 1942) was an American professional baseball player. He played all or part of seven seasons in Major League Baseball, from 1912 until 1918, for the St. Louis Cardinals and Philadelphia Phillies, primarily as a catcher.

Burns died on June 1, 1942. He is buried at San Carlos Cemetery in Monterey, California.
