= Walt Marbet =

American baseball player (1890–1956)

- Pitcher
- Born: September 13, 1890; Plymouth County, Iowa
- Died: September 24, 1956 (aged 66); Hohenwald, Tennessee
- Batted: Right Threw: Right

MLB debut
- June 17, 1913, for the St. Louis Cardinals

Last MLB appearance
- June 25, 1913, for the St. Louis Cardinals

MLB statistics
- Win–loss record: 0–1
- Earned run average: 16.20
- Strikeout(s): 1
- Stats at Baseball Reference

Teams
- St. Louis Cardinals (1913)

Walter William Marbet (September 13, 1890 – September 24, 1956) was a Major League Baseball pitcher who played with the St. Louis Cardinals in 1913.
