= Tuffy Stewart =

American baseball player (1883–1934)

- Right fielder
- Born: July 31, 1883; Chicago, Illinois
- Died: November 18, 1934 (aged 51); Chicago, Illinois
- Batted: Left Threw: Left

MLB debut
- August 8, 1913, for the Chicago Cubs

Last MLB appearance
- April 25, 1914, for the Chicago Cubs

MLB statistics
- Games: 11
- At bats: 9
- Hits: 1
- Stats at Baseball Reference

Teams
- Chicago Cubs (1913–1914)

Charles Eugene "Tuffy" Stewart (July 31, 1883 – November 18, 1934) was a Major League Baseball outfielder. Stewart played for the Chicago Cubs in 1913 and 1914. In 11 career games, he had 1 hit in 9 at-bats. He batted and threw left-handed.

Stewart was born and died in Chicago, Illinois.
