= Bernie Duffy =

American baseball player (1893–1962)

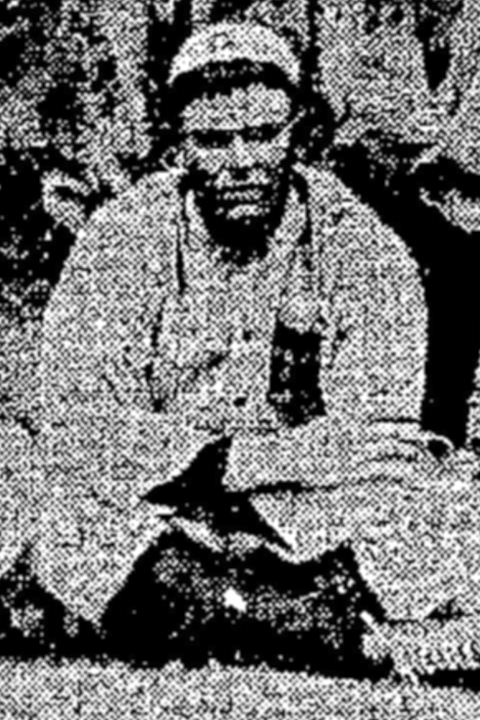
- Pitcher
- Born: August 18, 1893; Vinson, Oklahoma Territory
- Died: February 9, 1962 (aged 68); Abilene, Texas, U.S.
- Batted: Right Threw: Right

MLB debut
- September 20, 1913, for the Pittsburgh Pirates

Last MLB appearance
- September 27, 1913, for the Pittsburgh Pirates

MLB statistics
- Games pitched: 3
- Earned run average: 5.56
- Strikeouts: 8
- Stats at Baseball Reference

Teams
- Pittsburgh Pirates (1913)

Bernard Allen Duffy (August 18, 1893 – February 9, 1962) was an American right handed Major League Baseball pitcher who played with the Pittsburgh Pirates from 1912 to 1919. Also known as Barney Duffy and Dan Duffy, Barney played alongside famous Pittsburgh Pirate Honus Wagner (known as the Flying Dutchman). The Oklahoma native began his baseball career in 1910 in Helena, Montana. He was purchased by the Pirates in the fall of 1913. He then was sent to St. Joe in the Western League where he played during 1914. Recalled that fall, he was turned over to Youngstown in the Central league, remaining there until the club disbanded. In 1916, he was with Grand Rapids and then sold to Wheeling. The pitcher was 5'11" and weighed around 180 lbs.

In 1913, Barney played for the Great Falls Electrics. The September 5, 1913 Salt Lake Tribune reports that Barney "started under a handicap. He was unknown, and there were those who predicted his early finish. The things that were said to him would have taken the heart out of any 19 year old lad. But Barney Duffy was different. He told 'em that he was going to go in and pitch ball and show 'em that he was there. And her certainly has made good. Now there isn't a man in the Union association who doubts for a minute that Duffy will stick with the Pirates."

In 1913, the Pirates owner received a letter from a former major league manager who was piloting a club in the Union Association from which came the pitcher Barney Duffy. He is quoted in the January 31, 1914, edition of the Pittsburgh Press as writing, "I was certainly glad to hear that you had secured E. Konetchy. that was a great deal for your club. I consider Koney the best first baseman I have ever seen, and I have looked at a few of them in my time. Am also glad that you got Barney Duffy from Great Falls. Hang onto him whatever you do. He is the makings of one of the greatest pitchers of all time. He beat my club out of the pennant last summer, and did it in a single week. I watched him closely, and believe he will make you a genuine world-beater for you. Whatever you do don't let him get away from you."

Duffy quit baseball in 1919 to enter into the oil business in Texas. He was an independent operator at Wichita Falls and Burkburnett and then moved to Abilene, Texas, where he settled down with his wife Merle Hart Duffy.
