= Palmer Hildebrand =

American baseball player (1884–1960)

- Catcher
- Born: December 23, 1884; Shauck, Ohio, U.S.
- Died: January 25, 1960 (aged 75); North Canton, Ohio, U.S.
- Batted: Right Threw: Right

MLB debut
- May 14, 1913, for the St. Louis Cardinals

Last MLB appearance
- September 7, 1913, for the St. Louis Cardinals

MLB statistics
- Batting average: .164
- Home runs: 0
- Runs batted in: 1
- Stats at Baseball Reference

Teams
- St. Louis Cardinals (1913)

Palmer Marion Hildebrand (December 23, 1884 – January 25, 1960) was an American catcher in Major League Baseball. Nicknamed "Pete", he played for the St. Louis Cardinals in 1913.
