= Lew McCarty =

American baseball player (1888–1930)

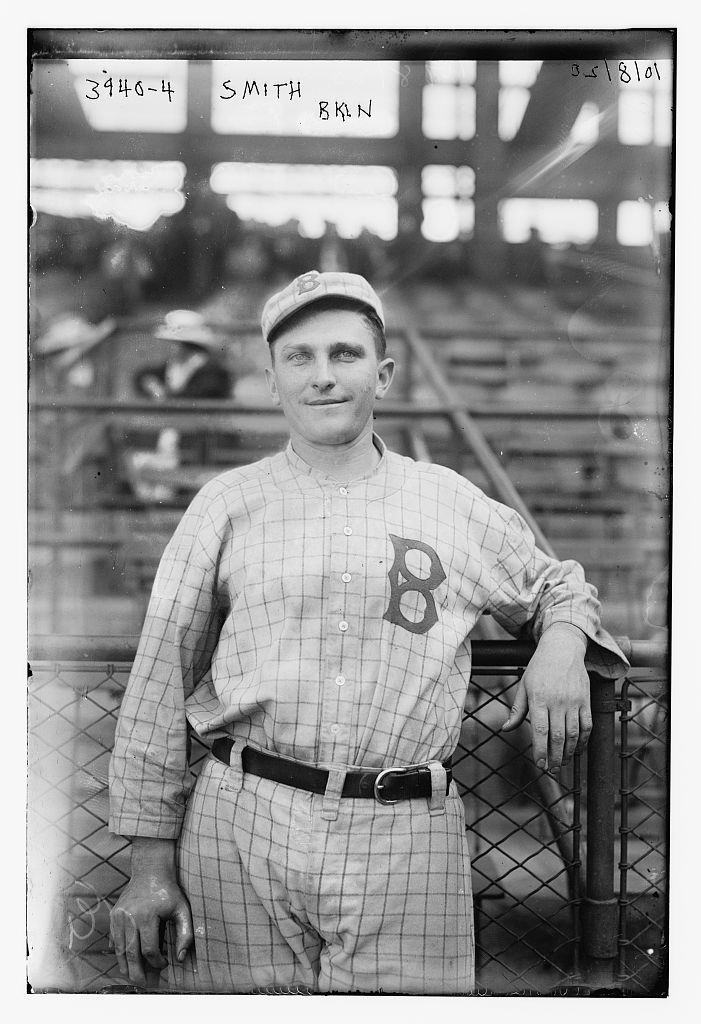
- Catcher
- Born: November 17, 1888; Milton, Pennsylvania, U.S.
- Died: June 9, 1930 (aged 41); Reading, Pennsylvania, U.S.
- Batted: Right Threw: Right

MLB debut
- August 30, 1913, for the Brooklyn Superbas

Last MLB appearance
- April 13, 1921, for the St. Louis Cardinals

MLB statistics
- Batting average: .266
- Home runs: 5
- Runs batted in: 138
- Stats at Baseball Reference

Teams
- Brooklyn Superbas / Robins (1913–1916); New York Giants (1916–1920); St. Louis Cardinals (1920–1921)

George Lewis McCarty (November 17, 1888 – June 9, 1930) was an American professional baseball player who was a catcher from 1913 to 1921 in the National League. He appeared in the 1917 World Series as a member of the New York Giants.

== Biography ==
During his career, in which he appeared in the major leagues in nine consecutive seasons, McCarty was used almost exclusively as a catcher, with the exception of seventeen games at first base. He accumulated 1479 regular season at bats with 393 hits for a .266 batting average with five home runs and 138 RBI.

McCarty reached the major leagues with the Brooklyn Superbas, making his debut on August 30, 1913. He played for Brooklyn until being traded to the Giants for Fred Merkle on August 25, 1916. On July 24, 1920, McCarty was released by the Giants and claimed on waivers by the St. Louis Cardinals soon after, where he would finish his major league career.

In his lone World Series appearance, in 1917 with the Giants, McCarty had two hits in five at bats, including a triple and an RBI against the White Sox.
