= Gary Ignasiak =

American baseball player (born 1949)

- Pitcher
- Born: September 1, 1949 (age 76); Anchorville, Michigan, U.S.
- Batted: Right Threw: Left

MLB debut
- September 20, 1973, for the Detroit Tigers

Last MLB appearance
- September 29, 1973, for the Detroit Tigers

MLB statistics
- Win–loss record: 0–0
- Earned run average: 3.86
- Strikeouts: 4
- Stats at Baseball Reference

Teams
- Detroit Tigers (1973)

Gary Raymond Ignasiak (born September 1, 1949) is an American former Major League Baseball player. He played part of one season with the Detroit Tigers. Ignasiak was drafted by the Detroit Tigers in the 36th round of the 1967 amateur draft, and appeared in 3 games with the Tigers in 1973, all as a relief pitcher. He had a career earned run average of 3.86, while having a career win/loss record of 0-0. Ignasiak played his final game September 29, 1973.

Gary's brother, Mike Ignasiak, also pitched in the majors.
