= Bull Wagner =

American baseball player (1887-1967)

- Pitcher
- Born: December 25, 1887; Lilley, Michigan, U.S.
- Died: October 2, 1967 (aged 79); Muskegon, Michigan, U.S.
- Batted: Right Threw: Right

MLB debut
- June 2, 1913, for the Brooklyn Superbas

Last MLB appearance
- May 30, 1914, for the Brooklyn Robins

MLB statistics
- Win–loss record: 4–3
- Earned run average: 5.64
- Strikeouts: 15
- Stats at Baseball Reference

Teams
- Brooklyn Superbas/Robins (1913–1914)

William George Wagner (December 25, 1887 – October 2, 1967) was an American pitcher in Major League Baseball. He pitched from 1913 to 1914.
