= Red Smith (third baseman) =

American baseball player (1890-1966)

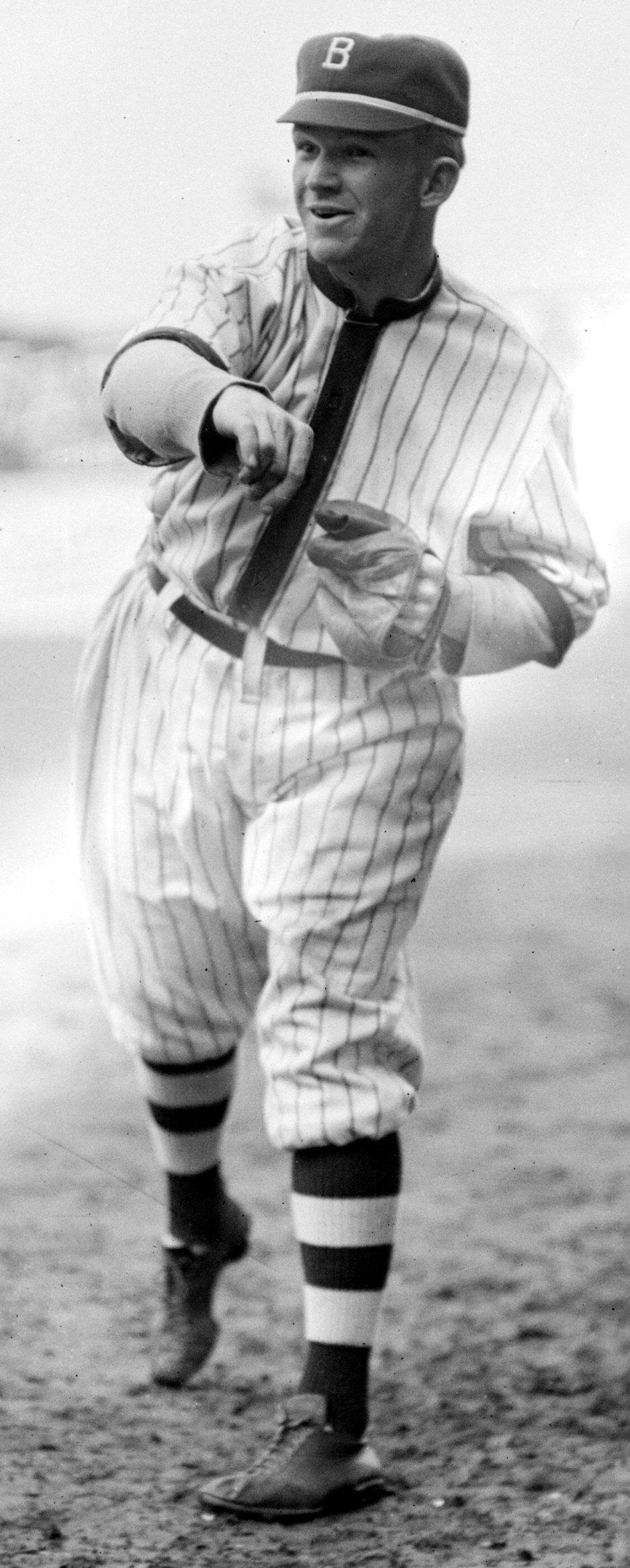
- Third baseman
- Born: April 6, 1890; Greenville, South Carolina, U.S.
- Died: October 11, 1966 (aged 76); Atlanta, Georgia, U.S.
- Batted: Right Threw: Right

MLB debut
- September 5, 1911, for the Brooklyn Dodgers

Last MLB appearance
- September 25, 1919, for the Boston Braves

MLB statistics
- Batting average: .278
- Home runs: 27
- Runs batted in: 514
- Stats at Baseball Reference

Teams
- Brooklyn Dodgers / Superbas / Robins (1911–1914); Boston Braves (1914–1919)

James Carlisle "Red" Smith (April 6, 1890 – October 11, 1966) was an American Major League Baseball third baseman for the Brooklyn teams of the early 1910s (known by a few different names, Dodgers in 1911 and 1912, Superbas in 1913, and Robins in 1914, now the Los Angeles Dodgers) and the Braves teams of the late 1910s (then located in Boston). He was an interesting player for the time, accumulating a solid .278 career batting average. He was right-handed and stood around 5 ft 11 in (1.80 m).

Smith was born in Greenville, South Carolina, and attended the Alabama Polytechnic Institute (now known as Auburn University) before making his ML debut with Brooklyn on September 5, 1911.

Smith's best years came in 1913 and 1914 although all his years were quite solid, and in 1918 he had his best season batting average at .298 in 429 at bats. In 1913, he put up good numbers in all categories, including a league-leading 40 doubles, career-high 10 triples, and a tie for a career-high in stolen bases, with 22. He also had 22 the previous year. In 1914, the year in which Smith was sold to Boston, he put up very good numbers including a career-high .395 slugging percentage and career-highs in home runs (7) and RBIs (85). He batted .314 after he was traded on August 10.

Smith was not a very solid fielding 3B, putting up bad fielding percentages (.932 career at 3B) and generally over 30 errors a year. After going to Boston, he finally had the chance to compete for a pennant, and won a World Series with them in 1914, but he didn't play due to broken right leg that he suffered on the final day of the season, and his team never got there again, peaking at a 2nd-place finish in 1915 under manager George Stallings. They finished seven games behind the Philadelphia Phillies that year, and dropped off soon after that. Still, Smith is often remembered as a significant part of Boston's climb into first place in 1914.

In an active nine-year career, Smith had a .278 average with 27 home runs and 514 RBIs in 1117 career games. He had a total of 1087 career hits in 3907 at bats. Other stats included 117 career stolen bases, 477 runs scored, 208 all-time doubles and 49 triples.

Smith died on October 11, 1966, in Atlanta.

== See also ==
- List of Major League Baseball annual doubles leaders
