= Mark Stewart (baseball) =

American baseball player (1889–1932)

- Catcher
- Born: October 14, 1889; Whitlock, Tennessee, U.S.
- Died: January 17, 1932 (aged 42); Memphis, Tennessee, U.S.
- Batted: Left Threw: Right

MLB debut
- October 4, 1913, for the Cincinnati Reds

Last MLB appearance
- October 4, 1913, for the Cincinnati Reds

MLB statistics
- Games played: 1
- At bats: 1
- Hits: 0
- Stats at Baseball Reference

Teams
- Cincinnati Reds (1913)

Mark Stewart (October 14, 1889 – January 17, 1932), nicknamed "Big Stick", was an American Major League Baseball catcher who played with the Cincinnati Reds in 1913. He played only one game, and went hitless in one at bat.
