= Elmer Brown (pitcher) =

American baseball player (1883–1955)

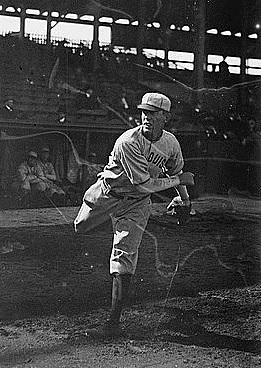
- Pitcher
- Born: August 25, 1883; Southport, Indiana
- Died: January 23, 1955 (aged 71); Indianapolis, Indiana
- Batted: Left Threw: Right

MLB debut
- September 16, 1911, for the St. Louis Browns

Last MLB appearance
- April 14, 1915, for the Brooklyn Robins

MLB statistics
- Win–loss record: 7-11
- Earned run average: 3.48
- Strikeouts: 79
- Stats at Baseball Reference

Teams
- St. Louis Browns (1911–1912); Brooklyn Dodgers/Robins (1913–1915)

Elmer Young Brown (August 25, 1883 – January 23, 1955) was a pitcher in Major League Baseball. He pitched from 1911 to 1915 for the St. Louis Browns and Brooklyn Dodgers.
