= Mike Ignasiak =

American baseball player (born 1966)

- Pitcher
- Born: March 12, 1966 (age 59); Anchorville, Michigan, U.S.
- Batted: Switch Threw: Right

MLB debut
- August 22, 1991, for the Milwaukee Brewers

Last MLB appearance
- August 21, 1995, for the Milwaukee Brewers

MLB statistics
- Win–loss record: 10–4
- Earned run average: 4.80
- Strikeouts: 88
- Stats at Baseball Reference

Teams
- Milwaukee Brewers (1991, 1993–1995)
Medals
Men's baseball
Representing United States
World Junior Baseball Championship
Silver medal – second place	1984 Saskatoon	Team

Michael James Ignasiak (born March 12, 1966) is an American former Major League Baseball pitcher. He pitched parts of four seasons in the major leagues between 1991 and 1995, all for the Milwaukee Brewers.

== Career ==
=== Amateur ===
After graduating from St. Mary's Preparatory, Ignasiak attended the University of Michigan. In 1986 and 1987 he played collegiate summer baseball with the Orleans Cardinals of the Cape Cod Baseball League and was named an all-star both seasons. He was selected by the Milwaukee Brewers in the 8th round of the 1988 MLB draft.

=== Professional ===
Ignasiak made his Major League debut on August 22, 1991, allowing two earned runs in 2.1 innings of relief against the Toronto Blue Jays. Ignasiak was credited with his first Major League win in that game. He would go on to appear in three more games (one as a start, two in relief) during the 1991 season, finishing with a 2–1 record and an ERA of 5.68. Ignasiak struck out 10 batters and walked 8 in 12.2 innings pitched.

Ignasiak spent the entire 1992 season in the minors, appearing in 62 games and pitching 92 innings for Milwaukee's Triple-A affiliate, the Denver Zephyrs. With Denver, Ignasiak went 6–2, with an ERA of 2.93 and 10 saves.

In 1993, Ignasiak split time between the Brewers and the New Orleans Zephyrs, who had relocated from Denver. With New Orleans, Ignasiak posted a 1.09 ERA in 35 appearances (57.2 innings), posting a 6–0 record and saving 9 games. At the major league level, Ignasiak saw action in 27 games (37 innings), with a 1–1 record, a 3.65 ERA, 28 K's and 21 walks.

During the 1994 season, Ignasiak spent most of his time in the majors, appearing in only 8 games for Triple-A New Orleans. With the Brewers, Ignasiak appeared in 23 games, making 5 starts. He posted a 3-1 record, with an ERA of 4.53 over 47.2 innings. Ignasiak struck out 24 batters and walked 13.

1995 would be Ignasiak's final season in the major leagues. In 25 appearances with the Brewers, Ignasiak posted a 4–1 record and a career-worst 5.90 ERA. Over 39.2 innings, he struck out 26 batters and walked 23.

Prior to the 1996 season, Ignasiak signed on with the Boston Red Sox. However, he suffered a career-ending back injury during Spring Training.

For his career, Ignasiak recorded a 4.80 ERA and a .714 win-loss percentage. He appeared in 79 games and threw 137 innings, striking out 88 batters and walking 65.

== Personal life ==
Ignasiak is the younger brother of former major league pitcher Gary Ignasiak, who is 16 years older than Mike and appeared in 3 games for the 1973 Detroit Tigers. Ignasiak is now a successful amateur golfer and also owns a Dairy Queen franchise in Saline, Michigan.
