= Conzelmann =

Konzelmann, Konzelman, Conzelmann may refer to:

- Dustin-Leigh Seltzer, née Konzelman (born 1982), a beauty queen and reality television contestant
- Gerhard Konzelmann (1932, Stuttgart – 2008, Stuttgart), a German journalist
- Hans Conzelmann (1915–1989), was a Protestant, German theologian and New Testament scholar.
