= Karl Meister =

American baseball player (1891–1967)

- Center fielder
- Born: May 15, 1891; Marietta, Ohio, U.S.
- Died: August 15, 1967 (aged 76); Marietta, Ohio, U.S.
- Batted: Right Threw: Right

MLB debut
- August 10, 1913, for the Cincinnati Reds

Last MLB appearance
- September 8, 1913, for the Cincinnati Reds
- Stats at Baseball Reference

Teams
- Cincinnati Reds (1913)

Karl Daniel Meister (May 15, 1891 – August 15, 1967) was an American Major League Baseball center fielder. Meister played in four games for the Cincinnati Reds in 1913.
