= Finners Quinlan =

American baseball player (1887–1966)

- Outfielder
- Born: October 21, 1887; Scranton, Pennsylvania, U.S.
- Died: February 17, 1966 (aged 78); Scranton, Pennsylvania, U.S.
- Batted: Left Threw: Left

MLB debut
- September 6, 1913, for the St. Louis Cardinals

Last MLB appearance
- July 15, 1915, for the Chicago White Sox

MLB statistics
- Batting average: .183
- Home runs: 0
- Runs batted in: 8
- Stats at Baseball Reference

Teams
- St. Louis Cardinals (1913); Chicago White Sox (1915)

Thomas A. "Finners" Quinlan (October 21, 1887 – February 17, 1966) was an American professional baseball outfielder. He played in Major League Baseball with the St. Louis Cardinals in 1913 and Chicago White Sox in 1915. Quinlan was 5 feet 8 inches (173 cm) tall and weighed 154 pounds (70 kg).

== Career ==
Quinlan was born in Scranton, Pennsylvania, in 1887. He started his professional baseball career in 1908, when he played one game for the New York State League's Scranton Miners. In 1911 he played in the Ohio–Pennsylvania League for a season and then returned to the Scranton Miners for 1912 and 1913. He had a batting average of .283 in 1913, and in August of that year, his contract was sold to the St. Louis Cardinals.

Quinlan made his major league debut on September 6, 1913. He played 13 games for the Cardinals that season and batted .160 with one run batted in (RBI). The one RBI came on a game-winning hit off future Hall of Fame pitcher Christy Mathewson.

Quinlan returned to the minor leagues for one year. He batted .290 for the Pacific Coast League's Oakland Oaks and then was purchased by another major league club, the Chicago White Sox. He spent the early part of 1915 with Chicago, batted .193 in 42 games, and then returned to the Pacific Coast League with the Salt Lake City Bees.

In 1916, Quinlan batted a career-high .313 with 49 doubles. He led the PCL in both hits (241) and outfield assists (43). However, his batting average then dropped to .254 in 1917.

Quinlan did not play professional baseball in 1918, as he had joined the US Army for World War I. On September 9, 1918, he lost his left eye and his left arm in the Battle of Argonne Forest in France.

Upon returning to the states, Quinlan ran for and was elected county commissioner of Lackawanna County in 1919 and then won re-election. In 1929, he was voted onto the Scranton city council, and later as Registrar of Wills for four terms.

At the end of his career, Quinlan moved back to his hometown of Scranton, Pennsylvania, and died in 1966.
