= Harry Trekell =

American baseball player (1892–1965)

- Pitcher
- Born: November 18, 1892; Buda, Illinois, U.S.
- Died: November 4, 1965 (aged 72); Spokane, Washington, U.S.
- Batted: Right Threw: Right

MLB debut
- August 16, 1913, for the St. Louis Cardinals

Last MLB appearance
- September 22, 1913, for the St. Louis Cardinals

MLB statistics
- Win–loss record: 0–1
- Earned run average: 4.50
- Strikeouts: 15
- Stats at Baseball Reference

Teams
- St. Louis Cardinals (1913)

Harry Roy Trekell (November 18, 1892 – November 4, 1965) was a pitcher in Major League Baseball. He played for the St. Louis Cardinals in 1913.
