= Chuck Miller (baseball) =

American baseball player (1889–1961)

- Outfielder
- Born: September 18, 1889; Woodville, Ohio, U.S.
- Died: June 16, 1961 (aged 71); Houston, Texas, U.S.
- Batted: Left Threw: Left

MLB debut
- September 19, 1913, for the St. Louis Cardinals

Last MLB appearance
- October 5, 1914, for the St. Louis Cardinals

MLB statistics
- Batting average: .188
- Home runs: 0
- Runs batted in: 3
- Stats at Baseball Reference

Teams
- St. Louis Cardinals (1913–1914)

Charles Marion Miller (September 18, 1889 – June 16, 1961) was an American Major League Baseball outfielder who played for the St. Louis Cardinals in 1913 and 1914.
