= Andy Harrington (pitcher) =

American baseball player (1888–1938)

- Pitcher
- Born: November 13, 1888; Wakefield, Massachusetts, U.S.
- Died: November 12, 1938 (aged 49); Malden, Massachusetts, U.S.
- Batted: Right Threw: Right

MLB debut
- September 8, 1913, for the Cincinnati Reds

Last MLB appearance
- September 8, 1913, for the Cincinnati Reds

MLB statistics
- Games pitched: 1
- Earned run average: 9.00
- Strikeouts: 1
- Stats at Baseball Reference

Teams
- Cincinnati Reds (1913)

Andrew Francis Harrington (November 13, 1888 – November 12, 1938) was an American professional baseball pitcher who played in one game for the Cincinnati Reds on September 8, 1913.
