= Jack Ferry =

American baseball player (1887–1954)

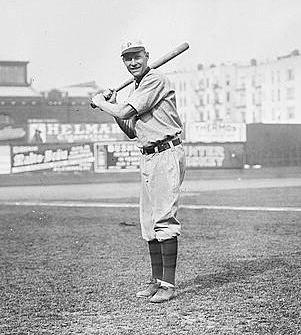
- Pitcher
- Born: April 7, 1887; Pittsfield, Massachusetts, U.S.
- Died: August 29, 1954 (aged 67); Pittsfield, Massachusetts, U.S.
- Batted: Right Threw: Right

MLB debut
- September 4, 1910, for the Pittsburgh Pirates

Last MLB appearance
- June 7, 1913, for the Pittsburgh Pirates

MLB statistics
- Win–loss record: 10–6
- Earned run average: 3.02
- Strikeouts: 56
- Stats at Baseball Reference

Teams
- Pittsburgh Pirates (1910–1913)

John Francis Ferry (April 7, 1887 – August 29, 1954) was an American pitcher and occasional pinch hitter in Major League Baseball. He played for the Pittsburgh Pirates from 1910 to 1913.

== Early life and education ==
Ferry was born in Pittsfield, Massachusetts and helped lead Pittsfield High School to the 1905 Berkshire County championship. Ferry attended Seton Hall College where he was a standout college baseball player as a pitcher, outfielder and first baseman.

== Professional career ==
In 1909, Ferry signed his first professional contract with the Jersey City Skeeters of the Class A Eastern League. On the season, he posted a 1–5 win-loss record and a team-best 0.947 walks plus hits per innings pitched (WHIP). In 1910, he posted an 8–11 record in 26 games; grabbing the attention of major league teams with 203 innings pitched and 90 strikeouts. As a hitter, he batted .227 in 88 at-bats.

In mid-August of 1910, the defending World Series champion Pittsburgh Pirates purchased Ferry's contract from Jersey City. He made his major league debut on September 4, 1910, in relief of starter Howie Camnitz in the fifth inning of the game against the Cincinnati Reds. Ferry held the Reds to only one run in five innings pitched. He also went 2-for-3 at the plate. For the rest of the season, Ferry pitched to a 1–2 record with an impressive 2.32 earned run average (ERA) in 31 innings pitched.

In 1911, Ferry helped the Pirates both on the mound and at the plate. As a pitcher, he posted a 6–4 record with a 3.15 ERA in 26 games (8 starts). At the plate, he played one game in left field and was an occasional pinch hitter slashing .310/.375/.414. In 1912, Ferry was poised to become a crucial part of the Pirates pitching rotation, however, he only made 11 appearances the entire season. From May 5, 1912, to August 19, 1912, Ferry pitched only five innings in three games. It is unclear why he was underused.

Returning for the 1913 season, Ferry was described by Pirates executive Barney Dreyfuss as having "a better curved ball than any other pitcher" in the National League. Despite the high praise, Ferry only pitched five innings in four relief appearances before being sent to the Columbus Senators. He pitched in the minor leagues until 1916 before moving back to Pittsfield, Massachusetts.

== Post-playing career ==
After returning home, Ferry began working at the General Electric plant in Pittsfield. He stayed involved in local organized baseball and ran for local office as a Pittsfield councilman and alderman, as well as a member of the Board of Assessors.

== External linkse ==
- Career statistics from Baseball Reference · Retrosheet · Baseball Almanac
- Jack Ferry at SABR Bio Project
