= Joe Conzelman =

American baseball player (1889–1979)

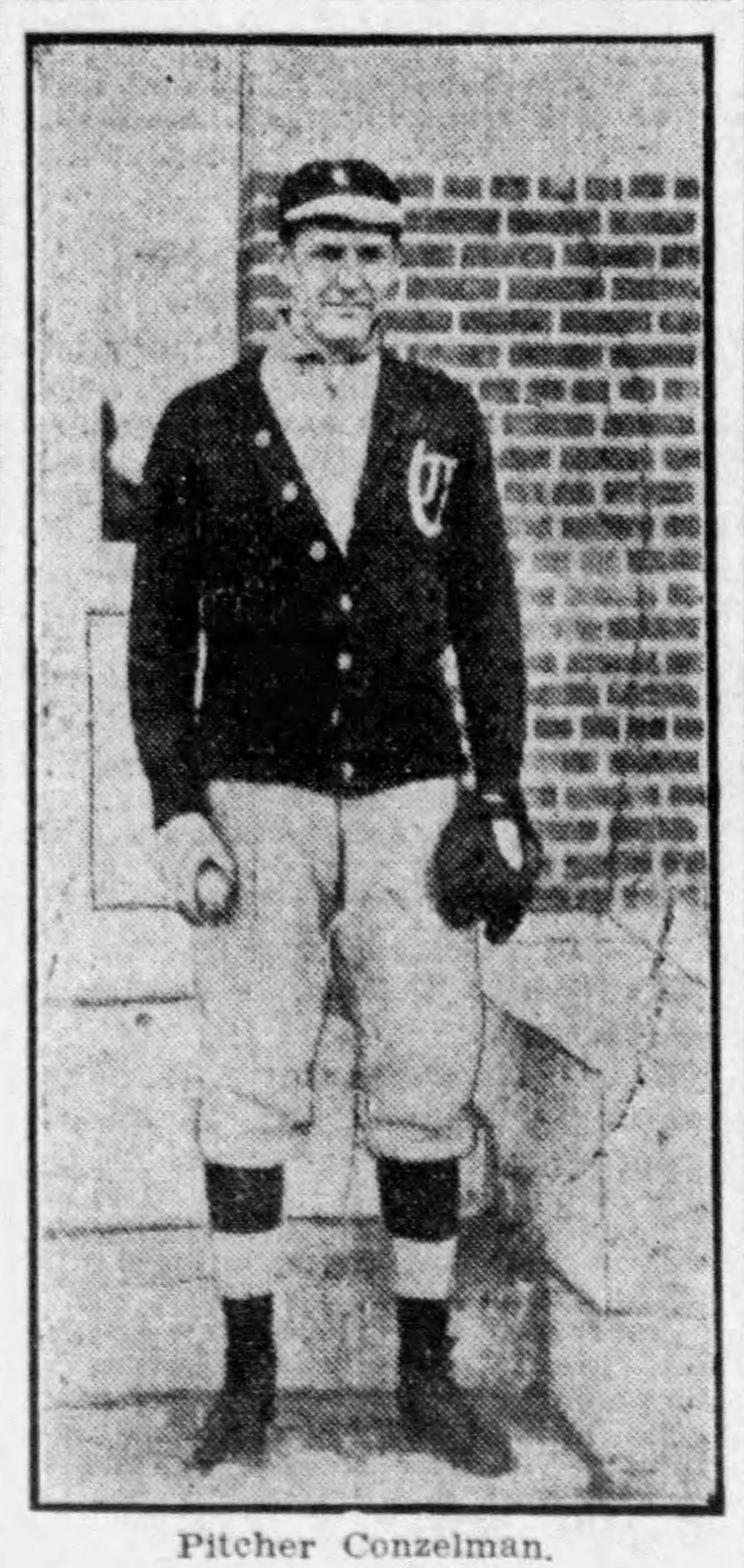
- Pitcher
- Born: July 14, 1889; Bristol, Connecticut, U.S.
- Died: April 17, 1979 (aged 89); Mountain Brook, Alabama, U.S.
- Batted: Right Threw: Right

MLB debut
- May 1, 1913, for the Pittsburgh Pirates

Last MLB appearance
- August 15, 1915, for the Pittsburgh Pirates

MLB statistics
- Win–loss record: 6–8
- Earned run average: 2.92
- Strikeouts: 70
- Stats at Baseball Reference

Teams
- Pittsburgh Pirates (1913–1915)

Joseph Harrison Conzelman (July 14, 1889 – April 17, 1979) was an American pitcher in Major League Baseball. He played for the Pittsburgh Pirates.

Conzelman attended Connecticut Agricultural College where he played college baseball, football and basketball. He was captain of the football team in 1909. He continued his college baseball career at Brown University where he once struck out 21 batters in a game and earned a degree in civil engineering. While still at Brown, he was scouted by Arthur Irwin of the New York Yankees but decided against turning professional in favor of focusing on his schooling.

After his time at Brown, Conzelman joined the Pittsburgh Pirates in June 1912 but did not get into a game in that season. The following season, he made the team out of spring training. He played his final Major League season with the Pirates in 1915.

Prior to the 1915 season, he earned a graduate engineering degree from Columbia University. In January 1916, he announced his retirement from baseball in order to accept a job with an engineering firm in Pittsburgh.

In October 1918, he graduated from the United States School of Military Aeronautics in Urbana, Illinois.
