= Pete Knisely =

American baseball player (1887–1948)

- Outfielder
- Born: August 11, 1887; Waynesburg, Pennsylvania, U.S.
- Died: July 1, 1948 (aged 60); Brownsville, Pennsylvania, U.S.
- Batted: Right Threw: Right

MLB debut
- September 4, 1912, for the Cincinnati Reds

Last MLB appearance
- September 23, 1915, for the Chicago Cubs

MLB statistics
- Batting average: .235
- Home runs: 0
- Runs batted in: 29
- Stats at Baseball Reference

Teams
- Cincinnati Reds (1912); Chicago Cubs (1913–1915)

Peter Cole Knisely (August 11, 1887 – July 1, 1948) was an American professional baseball player. He was an outfielder over parts of four seasons (1912–15) with the Cincinnati Reds and Chicago Cubs. For his career, he compiled a .235 batting average in 272 at-bats, with 29 runs batted in.

He was born in Waynesburg, Pennsylvania and died in Brownsville, Pennsylvania at the age of 60.
