= Brooklyn Tip-Tops all-time roster =

List of baseball players

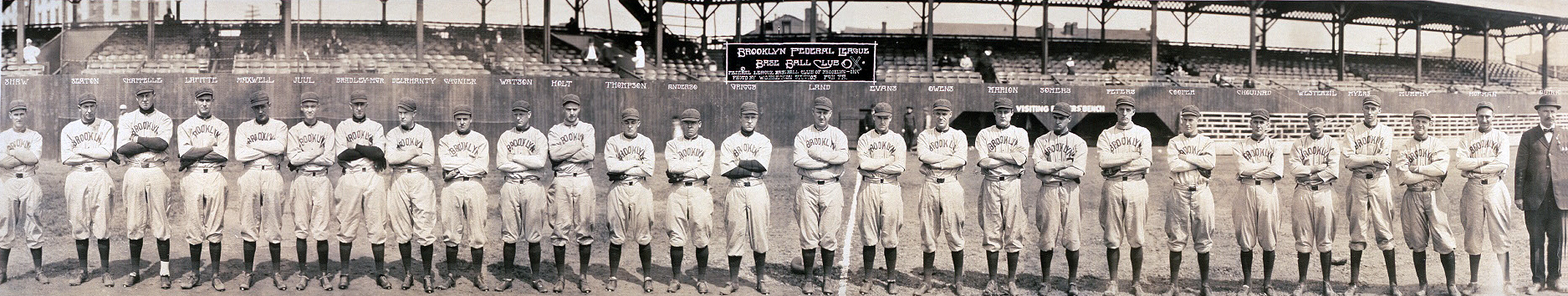

The following is a list of players and who appeared in at least one game for the Brooklyn Tip-Tops franchise of the Federal League from 1914 through 1915.

== Keys ==
Abbreviations
Name	Name of the player by official records
Position	Position that player played in the field
Seasons played	The seasons played for this franchise by the player
†	Elected to the Baseball Hall of Fame
§	Indicates that player was a player-manager

Position
C	Catcher	1B	First baseman
2B	Second baseman	3B	Third baseman
SS	Shortstop	IF	Infielder
LF	Left fielder	CF	Center fielder
RF	Right fielder	OF	Outfielder
SP	Starting pitcher	RP	Relief pitcher

== List of players ==
Player	Position	Seasons	Notes	Ref
George Anderson	OF	1914–1915		
Jim Bluejacket	P	1914–1915		
Bill Bradley §	3B	1914		
Hugh Bradley	1B	1915		
Mordecai Brown †	P	1914		
Esty Chaney	P	1914		
Bill Chappelle	P	1914		
Felix Chouinard	CF	1914–1915		
Claude Cooper	OF	1914–1915		
Jim Delahanty	2B	1914–1915		
Steve Evans	RF	1914–1915		
Cy Falkenberg	P	1915		
Happy Finneran	P	1914–1915		
Ed Gagnier	SS	1914–1915		
Art Griggs	1B	1914–1915		
Al Halt	3B/SS	1914–1915		
Ty Helfrich	2B	1915		
Bill Herring	P	1915		
Solly Hofman	CF	1914		
Byron Houck	P	1914		
Dave Howard	2B	1915		
Herold Juul	P	1914		
Frank Kane	OF	1915		
Benny Kauff	CF	1915		
Ed Lafitte	P	1914–1915		
Grover Land	C	1914–1915		
Lee Magee §	OF/2B	1915		
Dan Marion	P	1914–1915		
Bert Maxwell	P	1914		
John McGraw	P	1914		
Danny Murphy	2B/RF	1914–1915		
Hap Myers	1B	1914–1915		
Frank Owens	C	1914		
Rube Peters	P	1914		
Larry Pratt	C	1915		
Milt Reed	SS	1915		
Tom Seaton	P	1914–1915		
Al Shaw	OF	1914		
Mike Simon	C	1915		
Frank Smith	P	1915		
Fred Smith	SS/3B	1915		
Harry Smith	C	1915		
Rudy Sommers	P	1914		
Al Tesch	2B	1915		
Bill Upham	P	1915		
Joe Vernon	P	1914		
Mysterious Walker	P	1915		
Art Watson	C	1914–1915		
Rinaldo Williams	3B	1914		
Fin Wilson	P	1914–1915		
Hooks Wiltse	P	1915		
Tex Wisterzil	3B	1914–1915		
Dick Wright	C	1915		
