= 1915 Brooklyn Tip-Tops season =

1915 Brooklyn Tip-Tops
- League: Federal League
- Ballpark: Washington Park
- City: Brooklyn, New York
- Record: 70–82 (.461)
- League place: 7th
- Owners: Robert Ward
- Managers: Lee Magee, John Ganzel

The 1915 Brooklyn Tip-Tops season was a season in American baseball. The Tip-Tops finished in 7th place in the Federal League, 16 games behind the Chicago Whales. The season was notable in that it featured one of the only known major-league professional baseball games of the modern era in which admission was free (June 28, 1914, vs. the Chicago Whales).

== Regular season ==
Members of the 1915 Brooklyn Tip-Tops

=== Season standings ===
Federal League
Team	W	L	Pct.	GB	Home	Road
Chicago Whales	86	66	.566	—	44‍–‍32	42‍–‍34
St. Louis Terriers	87	67	.565	—	43‍–‍34	44‍–‍33
Pittsburgh Rebels	86	67	.562	½	45‍–‍31	41‍–‍36
Kansas City Packers	81	72	.529	5½	46‍–‍31	35‍–‍41
Newark Peppers	80	72	.526	6	40‍–‍39	40‍–‍33
Buffalo Blues	74	78	.487	12	37‍–‍40	37‍–‍38
Brooklyn Tip-Tops	70	82	.461	16	34‍–‍40	36‍–‍42
Baltimore Terrapins	47	107	.305	40	24‍–‍51	23‍–‍56

=== Record vs. opponents ===
1915 Federal League record Sources:
Team	BAL	BKF	BUF	CWH	KC	NWK	PRB	SLT
Baltimore	—	7–15	8–14	9–13	4–18	6–16	5–17	8–14
Brooklyn	15–7	—	9–11	7–15	11–11	12–10	9–13	7–15–1
Buffalo	14–8	11–9	—	8–14	11–11	11–11	9–13	10–12–1
Chicago	13–9	15–7	14–8	—	11–11	10–10–1	12–10–1	11–11–1
Kansas City	18–4	11–11	11–11	11–11	—	11–11	8–13	11–11
Newark	16–6	10–12	11–11	10–10–1	11–11	—	12–10–1	10–12–1
Pittsburgh	17–5	13–9	13–9	10–12–1	13–8	10–12–1	—	10–12–1
St. Louis	14–8	15–7–1	12–10–1	11–11–1	11–11	12–10–1	12–10–1	—

=== Roster ===
1915 Brooklyn Tip-Tops
Roster
Pitchers: Jim Bluejacket; Cy Falkenberg; Happy Finneran; Bill Herring; Ed Lafitte; Dan Marion; Tom Seaton; Frank Smith; Bill Upham; Mysterious Walker; Fin Wilson; Hooks Wiltse	Catchers: Grover Land; Larry Pratt; Mike Simon; Harry Smith; Art Watson; Dick Wright; Infielders: Hugh Bradley; Jim Delahanty; Ed Gagnier; Art Griggs; Al Halt; Ty Helfrich; Dave Howard; Lee Magee; Danny Murphy; Hap Myers; Milt Reed; Fred Smith; Al Tesch; Tex Wisterzil	Outfielders: George Anderson; Felix Chouinard; Claude Cooper; Steve Evans; Frank Kane; Benny Kauff	Manager: Lee Magee; John Ganzel

== Player stats ==
=== Batting ===
==== Starters by position ====
Note: Pos = Position; G = Games played; AB = At bats; H = Hits; Avg. = Batting average; HR = Home runs; RBI = Runs batted in

Pos	Player	G	AB	H	Avg.	HR	RBI
C	Grover Land	96	290	75	.259	0	22
1B	Hap Myers	118	341	98	.287	1	36
2B	Lee Magee	121	452	146	.323	4	49
SS	Fred Smith	110	385	95	.247	5	58
3B	Al Halt	151	524	131	.250	3	64
OF	George Anderson	136	511	135	.264	2	39
OF	Benny Kauff	136	483	165	.342	12	83
OF	Claude Cooper	153	527	155	.294	2	63

==== Other batters ====
Note: G = Games played; AB = At bats; H = Hits; Avg. = Batting average; HR = Home runs; RBI = Runs batted in

Player	G	AB	H	Avg.	HR	RBI
Steve Evans	63	216	64	.296	3	30
Mike Simon	47	142	25	.176	0	12
Hugh Bradley	37	126	31	.246	0	18
Tex Wisterzil	36	106	33	.311	0	21
Ty Helfrich	43	104	25	.240	0	5
Harry Smith	28	65	13	.200	1	4
Ed Gagnier	20	50	13	.260	0	4
Larry Pratt	20	49	9	.184	1	2
Art Griggs	27	38	11	.289	1	2
Dave Howard	25	36	8	.222	0	1
Milt Reed	10	31	9	.290	0	8
Jim Delahanty	17	25	6	.240	0	2
Art Watson	9	19	5	.263	0	1
Frank Kane	3	10	2	.200	0	2
Al Tesch	8	7	2	.286	0	2
Danny Murphy	5	6	1	.167	0	0
Dick Wright	4	5	0	.000	0	0
Felix Chouinard	4	4	2	.500	0	2

=== Pitching ===
==== Starting pitchers ====
Note: G = Games pitched; IP = Innings pitched; W = Wins; L = Losses; ERA = Earned run average; SO = Strikeouts

Player	G	IP	W	L	ERA	SO
Dan Marion	35	208.1	12	9	3.20	46
Tom Seaton	32	189.1	11	11	4.42	86
Jim Bluejacket	24	162.2	10	11	3.15	48
Ed Lafitte	17	117.2	6	9	3.98	34
Cy Falkenberg	7	48.0	3	3	1.50	20

==== Other pitchers ====
Note: G = Games pitched; IP = Innings pitched; W = Wins; L = Losses; ERA = Earned run average; SO = Strikeouts

Player	G	IP	W	L	ERA	SO
Happy Finneran	37	215.1	10	12	2.80	68
Bill Upham	33	121.0	7	8	3.35	46
Fin Wilson	18	102.1	1	8	3.78	47
Mysterious Walker	13	65.2	2	4	3.70	28
Frank Smith	15	63.0	5	2	3.14	24

==== Relief pitchers ====
Note: G = Games pitched; W = Wins; L = Losses; SV = Saves; ERA = Earned run average; SO = Strikeouts

Player	G	W	L	SV	ERA	SO
Hooks Wiltse	18	3	5	5	2.28	17
Bill Herring	3	0	0	0	15.00	3
