= 1914 Brooklyn Tip-Tops season =

1914 Brooklyn Tip-Tops
- League: Federal League
- Ballpark: Washington Park
- City: Brooklyn, New York
- Record: 77–77 (.500)
- League place: 5th
- Owners: Robert Ward
- Managers: Bill Bradley

The 1914 Brooklyn Tip-Tops season was a season in American baseball. The Tip-Tops finished in 5th place in the Federal League, 11½ games behind the Indianapolis Hoosiers.

== Regular season ==
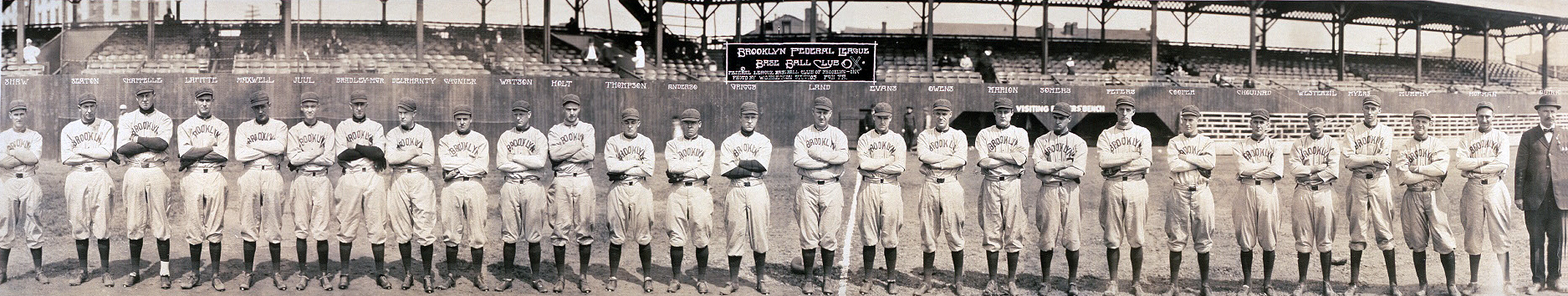
The 1914 Brooklyn Tip-Tops

=== Season standings ===
Federal League
Team	W	L	Pct.	GB	Home	Road
Indianapolis Hoosiers	88	65	.575	—	53‍–‍23	35‍–‍42
Chicago Federals	87	67	.565	1½	43‍–‍34	44‍–‍33
Baltimore Terrapins	84	70	.545	4½	53‍–‍26	31‍–‍44
Buffalo Buffeds	80	71	.530	7	47‍–‍29	33‍–‍42
Brooklyn Tip-Tops	77	77	.500	11½	47‍–‍32	30‍–‍45
Kansas City Packers	67	84	.444	20	37‍–‍36	30‍–‍48
Pittsburgh Rebels	64	86	.427	22½	37‍–‍37	27‍–‍49
St. Louis Terriers	62	89	.411	25	32‍–‍43	30‍–‍46

=== Record vs. opponents ===
1914 Federal League record Sources:
Team	BAL	BKF	BUF	CWH	IND	KC	PRB	SLT
Baltimore	—	9–13	14–8–1	12–10	10–12–1	12–10	10–12–2	17–5–1
Brooklyn	13–9	—	11–11–1	9–13	3–19	11–11–1	17–5–1	13–9
Buffalo	8–14–1	11–11–1	—	10–12–1	11–10	12–10–1	13–7	15–7
Chicago	10–12	13–9	12–10–1	—	13–9–1	14–8	12–10	13–9–1
Indianapolis	12–10–2	19–3	10–11	9–13–1	—	13–9–1	12–10	13–9
Kansas City	10–12	11–11	10–12–1	8–14	9–13–1	—	11–10	8–12
Pittsburgh	12–10–2	5–17	7–13–1	10–12	10–12	10–11	—	10–11–1
St. Louis	5–17–1	9–13	7–15	9–13–1	9–13	12–8	11–10	—

=== Roster ===
1914 Brooklyn Tip-Tops
Roster
Pitchers: Jim Bluejacket; Mordecai Brown; Esty Chaney; Bill Chappelle; Happy Finneran; Byron Houck; Herold Juul; Ed Lafitte; Dan Marion; Bert Maxwell; John McGraw; Rube Peters; Tom Seaton; Rudy Sommers; Joe Vernon; Fin Wilson	Catchers: Grover Land; Yip Owens; Art Watson; Infielders: Jim Delahanty; Ed Gagnier; Art Griggs; Al Halt; Solly Hofman; Hap Myers; Rinaldo Williams; Tex Wisterzil	Outfielders: George Anderson; Felix Chouinard; Claude Cooper; Steve Evans; Danny Murphy; Al Shaw; Other batters: Bill Bradley	Manager: Bill Bradley

== Player stats ==
=== Batting ===
==== Starters by position ====
Note: Pos = Position; G = Games played; AB = At bats; H = Hits; Avg. = Batting average; HR = Home runs; RBI = Runs batted in

Pos	Player	G	AB	H	Avg.	HR	RBI
C	Grover Land	102	335	92	.275	0	29
1B	Hap Myers	92	305	67	.220	1	29
2B	Solly Hofman	147	515	148	.287	5	83
SS	Ed Gagnier	94	337	63	.187	0	25
3B	Tex Wisterzil	149	534	137	.257	0	66
OF	Steve Evans	145	514	179	.348	12	96
OF	Claude Cooper	113	399	96	.241	2	25
OF	Al Shaw	112	376	122	.324	5	49

==== Other batters ====
Note: G = Games played; AB = At bats; H = Hits; Avg. = Batting average; HR = Home runs; RBI = Runs batted in

Player	G	AB	H	Avg.	HR	RBI
George Anderson	98	364	115	.316	3	24
Al Halt	80	261	61	.234	3	25
Jim Delahanty	74	214	62	.290	0	15
Yip Owens	58	184	51	.277	2	20
Danny Murphy	52	161	49	.304	4	32
Art Griggs	40	112	32	.286	1	15
Felix Chouinard	32	79	20	.253	0	8
Art Watson	22	46	13	.283	1	3
Rinaldo Williams	4	15	4	.267	0	0
Bill Bradley	7	6	3	.500	0	3

=== Pitching ===
==== Starting pitchers ====
Note: G = Games pitched; IP = Innings pitched; W = Wins; L = Losses; ERA = Earned run average; SO = Strikeouts

Player	G	IP	W	L	ERA	SO
Tom Seaton	44	302.2	25	14	3.03	172
Ed Lafitte	42	290.2	18	15	2.63	137
Happy Finneran	27	175.1	12	11	3.18	54
Bert Maxwell	12	71.1	3	4	3.28	19
Mordecai Brown	9	57.2	2	5	4.21	32
Joe Vernon	1	3.1	0	0	10.80	0

==== Other pitchers ====
Note: G = Games pitched; IP = Innings pitched; W = Wins; L = Losses; ERA = Earned run average; SO = Strikeouts

Player	G	IP	W	L	ERA	SO
Byron Houck	17	92.0	2	6	3.13	45
Don Marion	17	89.1	3	2	3.93	41
Rudy Sommers	23	82.0	2	7	4.06	40
Bill Chappelle	16	74.1	4	2	3.15	31
Jim Bluejacket	17	67.0	4	5	3.76	29
Rube Peters	11	37.1	2	2	3.82	13
Harry Juul	9	29.0	0	3	6.21	16
Fin Wilson	2	7.0	0	1	7.71	4

==== Relief pitchers ====
Note: G = Games pitched; W = Wins; L = Losses; SV = Saves; ERA = Earned run average; SO = Strikeouts

Player	G	W	L	SV	ERA	SO
Esty Chaney	1	0	0	0	6.75	1
John McGraw	1	0	0	0	0.00	2
