= List of Major League Baseball players (Wi–Wz) =

The following is a list of Major League Baseball players, retired or active.

== Wi through Wy ==
Name	Debut	Final game	Position	Teams	Ref
Kevin Wickander	August 10, 1989	June 12, 1996	Pitcher	Cleveland Indians, Cincinnati Reds, Detroit Tigers, Milwaukee Brewers	
Bob Wicker	August 11, 1901	September 1, 1906	Pitcher	St. Louis Cardinals, Chicago Cubs, Cincinnati Reds	
Floyd Wicker	June 23, 1968	July 7, 1971	Outfielder	St. Louis Cardinals, Montreal Expos, Milwaukee Brewers, San Francisco Giants	
Kemp Wicker	August 14, 1936	July 31, 1941	Pitcher	New York Yankees, Brooklyn Dodgers	
Dave Wickersham	September 18, 1960	July 26, 1969	Pitcher	Kansas City Athletics, Detroit Tigers, Pittsburgh Pirates, Kansas City Royals	
Al Wickland	August 21, 1913	August 15, 1919	Outfielder	Cincinnati Reds, Chicago Chi-Feds/Whales, Pittsburgh Rebels, Boston Braves, New York Yankees	
Bob Wickman	August 24, 1992	September 30, 2007	Pitcher	New York Yankees, Milwaukee Brewers, Cleveland Indians, Atlanta Braves, Arizona Diamondbacks	
Chris Widger	June 23, 1995	September 15, 2006	Catcher	Seattle Mariners, Montreal Expos, New York Yankees, St. Louis Cardinals, Chicago White Sox, Baltimore Orioles	
Al Widmar	April 25, 1947	April 17, 1952	Pitcher	Boston Red Sox, St. Louis Browns, Chicago White Sox	
Wild Bill Widner	June 8, 1887	July 23, 1891	Pitcher	Cincinnati Red Stockings (AA), Washington Nationals (1886–1889), Columbus Solons, Cincinnati Kelly's Killers	
Ted Wieand	September 27, 1958	April 24, 1960	Pitcher	Cincinnati Redlegs/Reds	
Charlie Wiedemeyer	September 9, 1934	September 30, 1934	Pitcher	Chicago Cubs	
Tom Wiedenbauer	September 14, 1979	September 30, 1979	Outfielder	Houston Astros	
Tom Wieghaus	October 4, 1981	May 2, 1984	Catcher	Montreal Expos, Houston Astros	
Jack Wieneke	July 4, 1921	August 22, 1921	Pitcher	Chicago White Sox	
Bob Wiesler	August 3, 1951	May 10, 1958	Pitcher	New York Yankees, Washington Senators	
Whitey Wietelmann	September 6, 1939	September 18, 1947	Shortstop	Boston Bees/Braves, Pittsburgh Pirates	
Matt Wieters	May 29, 2009		Catcher	Baltimore Orioles	
Alan Wiggins	September 4, 1981	August 28, 1987	Second baseman	San Diego Padres, Baltimore Orioles	
Scott Wiggins	September 11, 2002	September 20, 2002	Pitcher	Toronto Blue Jays	
Ty Wigginton	May 16, 2002		Third baseman	New York Mets, Pittsburgh Pirates, Tampa Bay Devil Rays, Houston Astros, Baltimore Orioles, Colorado Rockies	
Jimmy Wiggs	April 23, 1903	May 25, 1906	Pitcher	Cincinnati Reds, Detroit Tigers	
Bill Wight	April 17, 1946	September 21, 1958	Pitcher	New York Yankees, Chicago White Sox, Boston Red Sox, Detroit Tigers, Cleveland Indians, Baltimore Orioles, Cincinnati Reds, St. Louis Cardinals	
Fred Wigington	April 20, 1923	September 24, 1923	Pitcher	St. Louis Cardinals	
Sandy Wihtol	September 7, 1979	October 2, 1982	Pitcher	Cleveland Indians	
Del Wilber	April 21, 1946	August 19, 1954	Catcher	St. Louis Cardinals, Philadelphia Phillies, Boston Red Sox	
Claude Wilborn	September 8, 1940	September 29, 1940	Outfielder	Boston Bees	
Ted Wilborn	April 5, 1979	October 5, 1980	Outfielder	Toronto Blue Jays, New York Yankees	
Milt Wilcox	September 5, 1976	June 12, 1986	Pitcher	Cincinnati Reds, Cleveland Indians, Chicago Cubs, Detroit Tigers, Seattle Mariners	
Randy Wiles	August 7, 1977	August 16, 1977	Pitcher	Chicago White Sox	
Joseph Wiley	June 23, 1884	June 23, 1884	Third baseman	Washington Nationals (UA)	
Mark Wiley	June 17, 1975	September 29, 1978	Pitcher	Minnesota Twins, San Diego Padres, Toronto Blue Jays	
Rob Wilfong	April 10, 1977	May 8, 1987	Second baseman	Minnesota Twins, California Angels, San Francisco Giants	
Harry Wilhelm	August 12, 1899	August 23, 1899	Pitcher	Louisville Colonels	
Hoyt Wilhelm β	April 19, 1952	July 10, 1972	Pitcher	New York Giants, St. Louis Cardinals, Cleveland Indians, Baltimore Orioles, Chicago White Sox, California Angels, Atlanta Braves, Chicago Cubs, Los Angeles Dodgers	
Jim Wilhelm	September 4, 1978	September 30, 1979	Outfielder	San Diego Padres	
Kaiser Wilhelm	April 18, 1903	August 26, 1921	Pitcher	Pittsburgh Pirates, Boston Beaneaters, Brooklyn Superbas, Baltimore Terrapins, Philadelphia Phillies	
Spider Wilhelm	September 6, 1953	September 27, 1953	Shortstop	Philadelphia Athletics	
Tom Wilhelmsen	April 3, 2011		Pitcher	Seattle Mariners	
Joe Wilhoit	April 12, 1916	September 28, 1919	Outfielder	Boston Braves, Pittsburgh Pirates, New York Giants, Boston Red Sox	
Denney Wilie	July 27, 1911	October 3, 1915	Outfielder	St. Louis Cardinals, Cleveland Indians	
Adam Wilk	May 26, 2011		Pitcher	Detroit Tigers	
Harry Wilke	May 12, 1927	May 14, 1927	Third baseman	Chicago Cubs	
Brad Wilkerson	July 12, 2001	September 28, 2008	Outfielder	Montreal Expos, Texas Rangers, Seattle Mariners, Toronto Blue Jays	
Curtis Wilkerson	September 10, 1983	May 16, 1993	Utility infielder	Texas Rangers, Chicago Cubs, Pittsburgh Pirates, Kansas City Royals	
Lefty Wilkie	April 22, 1941	June 5, 1946	Pitcher	Pittsburgh Pirates	
Bobby Wilkins	April 18, 1944	September 6, 1945	Shortstop	Philadelphia Athletics	
Dean Wilkins	August 21, 1989	August 9, 1991	Pitcher	Chicago Cubs, Houston Astros	
Eric Wilkins	April 11, 1979	July 23, 1979	Pitcher	Cleveland Indians	
Marc Wilkins	May 11, 1996	August 29, 2001	Pitcher	Pittsburgh Pirates	
Rick Wilkins	June 6, 1991	October 3, 2001	Catcher	Chicago Cubs, Houston Astros, San Francisco Giants, Seattle Mariners, New York Mets, Los Angeles Dodgers, St. Louis Cardinals, San Diego Padres	
Bill Wilkinson	June 13, 1985	October 2, 1988	Pitcher	Seattle Mariners	
Ed Wilkinson	July 4, 1911	September 26, 1911	Outfielder	New York Highlanders	
Roy Wilkinson	April 29, 1918	May 2, 1922	Pitcher	Cleveland Indians, Chicago White Sox	
Ted Wilks	April 25, 1944	August 5, 1953	Pitcher	St. Louis Cardinals, Pittsburgh Pirates, Cleveland Indians	
Bob Will	April 16, 1957	June 12, 1963	Outfielder	Chicago Cubs	
Jerry Willard	April 11, 1984	May 19, 1994	Catcher	Cleveland Indians, Oakland Athletics, Chicago White Sox, Atlanta Braves, Montreal Expos, Seattle Mariners	
Ed Willett	September 5, 1906	September 23, 1915	Pitcher	Detroit Tigers, St. Louis Terriers	
Carl Willey	April 30, 1958	September 25, 1965	Pitcher	Milwaukee Braves, New York Mets	
Nick Willhite	June 16, 1963	June 23, 1967	Pitcher	Los Angeles Dodgers, Washington Senators (1961–1971), California Angels, New York Mets	
Ace Williams	July 15, 1940	April 22, 1946	Pitcher	Boston Braves	
Al Williams	April 19, 1937	September 4, 1938	Pitcher	Philadelphia Athletics	
Albert Williams	May 7, 1980	September 26, 1984	Pitcher	Minnesota Twins	
Art Williams	May 7, 1902	September 1, 1902	Utility player	Chicago Orphans	
Bernie Williams (1970s OF)	September 7, 1970	May 12, 1974	Outfielder	San Francisco Giants, San Diego Padres	
Bernie Williams (1990s OF)	July 7, 1991	October 1, 2006	Outfielder	New York Yankees	
Billy Williams (LF) β	August 5, 1959	October 2, 1976	Outfielder	Chicago Cubs, Oakland Athletics	
Billy Williams (RF)	August 15, 1969	August 20, 1969	Outfielder	Seattle Pilots	
Bob Williams	July 3, 1911	September 30, 1913	Catcher	New York Highlanders/Yankees	
Brian Williams	September 16, 1991	July 5, 2000	Pitcher	Houston Astros, San Diego Padres, Detroit Tigers, Baltimore Orioles, Chicago Cubs, Cleveland Indians	
Charlie Williams	April 23, 1971	September 11, 1978	Pitcher	New York Mets, San Francisco Giants	
Cy Williams	July 18, 1912	September 22, 1930	Outfielder	Chicago Cubs, Philadelphia Phillies	
Dale Williams	August 12, 1876	September 9, 1876	Pitcher	Cincinnati Reds (1876–1880)	
Dallas Williams	September 19, 1981	October 2, 1983	Outfielder	Baltimore Orioles, Cincinnati Reds	
Dana Williams	June 19, 1989	July 2, 1989	Designated hitter	Boston Red Sox	
Dave Williams (1900s)	July 2, 1902	August 3, 1902	Pitcher	Boston Americans	
Dave Williams (2000s)	June 6, 2001		Pitcher	Pittsburgh Pirates, Cincinnati Reds, New York Mets	
Davey Williams	September 16, 1949	July 31, 1955	Second baseman	New York Giants	
Denny Williams	April 15, 1921	July 18, 1928	Outfielder	Cincinnati Reds, Boston Red Sox	
Dewey Williams	June 28, 1944	September 26, 1948	Catcher	Chicago Cubs, Cincinnati Reds	
Dib Williams	April 27, 1930	September 29, 1935	Utility infielder	Philadelphia Athletics, Boston Red Sox	
Dick Williams β	June 10, 1951	October 1, 1964	Utility player	Brooklyn Dodgers, Baltimore Orioles, Cleveland Indians, Kansas City Athletics, Boston Red Sox	
Don Williams (1958–62 P)	September 12, 1958	August 23, 1962	Pitcher	Pittsburgh Pirates, Kansas City Royals	
Don Williams (1963 P)	August 4, 1963	August 17, 1963	Pitcher	Minnesota Twins	
Earl Williams (1920s C)	May 27, 1928	June 2, 1928	Catcher	Boston Braves	
Earl Williams (1970s C)	September 30, 1970	September 25, 1977	Catcher	Atlanta Braves, Baltimore Orioles, Montreal Expos, Oakland Athletics	
Eddie Williams	April 18, 1986	May 27, 1998	Utility infielder	Cleveland Indians, Chicago White Sox, San Diego Padres, Detroit Tigers, Pittsburgh Pirates	
Frank Williams	April 5, 1984	September 27, 1989	Pitcher	San Francisco Giants, Cincinnati Reds, Detroit Tigers	
George Williams (2B)	July 16, 1961	July 5, 1964	Second baseman	Philadelphia Phillies, Houston Astros, Kansas City Athletics	
George Williams (C)	July 14, 1995	September 13, 2000	Catcher	Oakland Athletics, San Diego Padres	
Gerald Williams	September 15, 1992	October 2, 2005	Outfielder	New York Yankees, Milwaukee Brewers, Atlanta Braves, Tampa Bay Devil Rays, Florida Marlins, New York Mets	
Glenn Williams	June 7, 2005	June 28, 2005	Third baseman	Minnesota Twins	
Gus Williams (P)	April 18, 1890	April 22, 1890	Pitcher	Brooklyn Gladiators	
Gus Williams (OF)	April 12, 1911	June 18, 1915	Outfielder	St. Louis Browns	
Harry Williams	August 7, 1913	June 30, 1914	First baseman	New York Yankees	
Jeff Williams	September 12, 1999	September 28, 2002	Pitcher	Los Angeles Dodgers	
Jerome Williams	April 26, 2003		Pitcher	San Francisco Giants, Chicago Cubs, Washington Nationals, Los Angeles Angels of Anaheim	
Jim Williams	September 8, 1969	September 30, 1970	Outfielder	San Diego Padres	
Jimmy Williams	April 15, 1899	October 3, 1909	Second baseman	Pittsburgh Pirates, Baltimore Orioles (1901–02), New York Highlanders, St. Louis Browns	
Jimy Williams	April 26, 1966	September 21, 1967	Shortstop	St. Louis Cardinals	
Johnnie Williams	April 21, 1914	August 19, 1914	Pitcher	Detroit Tigers	
Keith Williams	June 7, 1996	June 23, 1996	Outfielder	San Francisco Giants	
Ken Williams	July 14, 1915	August 10, 1929	Outfielder	Cincinnati Reds, St. Louis Browns, Boston Red Sox	
Kenny Williams	September 2, 1986	October 4, 1991	Outfielder	Chicago White Sox, Detroit Tigers, Toronto Blue Jays, Montreal Expos	
Lefty Williams	September 17, 1913	September 25, 1920	Pitcher	Detroit Tigers, Chicago White Sox	
Leon Williams	June 2, 1926	August 30, 1926	Pitcher	Brooklyn Dodgers	
Mark Williams	May 20, 1977	May 22, 1977	Outfielder	Oakland Athletics	
Marsh Williams	July 7, 1916	August 25, 1916	Pitcher	Philadelphia Athletics	
Matt Williams (RHP)	August 2, 1983	October 5, 1985	Pitcher	Toronto Blue Jays, Texas Rangers	
Matt Williams (3B)	April 11, 1987	May 31, 2003	Third baseman	San Francisco Giants, Cleveland Indians, Arizona Diamondbacks	
Matt Williams (LHP)	April 5, 2000	April 29, 2000	Pitcher	Milwaukee Brewers	
Mike Williams	June 30, 1992	September 28, 2003	Pitcher	Philadelphia Phillies, Kansas City Royals, Pittsburgh Pirates, Houston Astros	
Mitch Williams	April 9, 1986	May 10, 1997	Pitcher	Texas Rangers, Chicago Cubs, Philadelphia Phillies, Houston Astros, California Angels, Kansas City Royals	
Mutt Williams	October 4, 1913	October 1, 1914	Pitcher	Washington Senators	
Otto Williams	October 5, 1902	June 9, 1906	Shortstop	St. Louis Cardinals, Chicago Cubs, Washington Senators	
Fred Williams	April 19, 1945	July 8, 1945	First baseman	Cleveland Indians	
Pop Williams	September 14, 1898	September 15, 1903	Pitcher	Washington Senators (1891–99), Chicago Orphans/Cubs, Philadelphia Phillies, Boston Beaneaters	
Randy Williams	September 11, 2004		Pitcher	Seattle Mariners, San Diego Padres, Colorado Rockies, Chicago White Sox, Boston Red Sox	
Reggie Williams (1980s OF)	September 2, 1985	October 2, 1988	Outfielder	Los Angeles Dodgers, Cleveland Indians	
Reggie Williams (1990s OF)	September 8, 1992	July 25, 1999	Outfielder	California Angels, Los Angeles Dodgers, Anaheim Angels	
Rick Williams	June 12, 1978	September 26, 1979	Pitcher	Houston Astros	
Rinaldo Williams	October 8, 1914	October 10, 1914	Third baseman	Brooklyn Tip-Tops	
Rip Williams	April 12, 1911	June 9, 1918	Utility player	Boston Red Sox, Washington Senators, Cleveland Indians	
Shad Williams	May 18, 1996	July 22, 1997	Pitcher	California/Anaheim Angels	
Stan Williams	May 17, 1958	August 1, 1972	Pitcher	Los Angeles Dodgers, New York Yankees, Cleveland Indians, Minnesota Twins, St. Louis Cardinals, Boston Red Sox	
Steamboat Williams	July 12, 1914	October 1, 1916	Pitcher	St. Louis Cardinals	
Ted Williams β	April 20, 1939	September 28, 1960	Outfielder	Boston Red Sox	
Todd Williams	April 29, 1995	June 15, 2007	Pitcher	Los Angeles Dodgers, Cincinnati Reds, Seattle Mariners, New York Yankees, Baltimore Orioles	
Tom Williams	May 1, 1892	September 14, 1893	Pitcher	Cleveland Spiders	
Walt Williams	April 21, 1964	September 22, 1975	Outfielder	Houston Colt .45s, Chicago White Sox, Cleveland Indians, New York Yankees	
Wash Williams	August 5, 1884	June 8, 1885	Outfielder	Richmond Virginians, Chicago White Stockings	
Woody Williams (IF)	September 5, 1938	September 30, 1945	Second baseman	Brooklyn Dodgers, Cincinnati Reds	
Woody Williams (P)	May 14, 1993	September 22, 2007	Pitcher	Toronto Blue Jays, San Diego Padres, St. Louis Cardinals, Houston Astros	
Al Williamson	April 27, 1928	April 27, 1928	Pitcher	Chicago White Sox	
Antone Williamson	May 31, 1997	July 3, 1997	First baseman	Milwaukee Brewers	
Howie Williamson	July 7, 1928	August 17, 1928	Pinch hitter	St. Louis Cardinals	
Mark Williamson	April 8, 1987	August 4, 1994	Pitcher	Baltimore Orioles	
Ned Williamson	May 1, 1878	September 27, 1890	Utility infielder	Indianapolis Blues, Chicago White Stockings, Chicago Pirates	
Scott Williamson	April 5, 1999		Pitcher	Cincinnati Reds, Boston Red Sox, Chicago Cubs, San Diego Padres, Baltimore Orioles	
Julius Willigrod	July 15, 1882	August 19, 1882	Outfielder	Detroit Wolverines, Cleveland Blues (NL)	
Hugh Willingham	September 13, 1930	May 4, 1933	Shortstop	Chicago White Sox, Philadelphia Phillies	
Josh Willingham	July 6, 2004		Outfielder	Florida Marlins, Oakland Athletics	
Carl Willis	June 9, 1984	May 3, 1995	Pitcher	Detroit Tigers, Cincinnati Reds, Chicago White Sox, Minnesota Twins	
Dale Willis	April 24, 1963	September 13, 1963	Pitcher	Kansas City Athletics	
Dontrelle Willis	May 9, 2003		Pitcher	Florida Marlins, Detroit Tigers, Arizona Diamondbacks, Cincinnati Reds	
Jim Willis	April 22, 1953	June 5, 1954	Pitcher	Chicago Cubs	
Joe Willis	May 3, 1911	June 10, 1913	Pitcher	St. Louis Browns, St. Louis Cardinals	
Lefty Willis	October 3, 1925	July 12, 1927	Pitcher	Philadelphia Athletics	
Les Willis	April 28, 1947	August 23, 1947	Pitcher	Cleveland Indians	
Mike Willis	April 13, 1977	June 11, 1981	Pitcher	Toronto Blue Jays	
Ron Willis	September 20, 1966	September 29, 1970	Pitcher	St. Louis Cardinals, Houston Astros, San Diego Padres	
Vic Willis β	April 20, 1898	September 5, 1910	Pitcher	Boston Beaneaters, Pittsburgh Pirates, St. Louis Cardinals	
Reggie Willits	April 26, 2006		Outfielder	Los Angeles Angels of Anaheim	
Claude Willoughby	September 16, 1925	May 28, 1931	Pitcher	Philadelphia Phillies, Pittsburgh Pirates	
Jim Willoughby	September 5, 1971	September 28, 1978	Pitcher	San Francisco Giants, Boston Red Sox, Chicago White Sox	
Wills (first name unknown)	May 14, 1884	July 25, 1884	Outfielder	Washington Nationals (AA), Kansas City Cowboys (UA)	
Bump Wills	April 7, 1977	October 3, 1982	Second baseman	Texas Rangers, Chicago Cubs	
Dave Wills	June 8, 1899	August 31, 1899	First baseman	Louisville Colonels	
Frank Wills	July 31, 1983	April 30, 1991	Pitcher	Kansas City Royals, Seattle Mariners, Cleveland Indians, Toronto Blue Jays	
Maury Wills	June 6, 1959	October 4, 1972	Shortstop	Los Angeles Dodgers, Pittsburgh Pirates, Montreal Expos	
Ted Wills	May 24, 1959	June 12, 1965	Pitcher	Boston Red Sox, Cincinnati Reds, Chicago White Sox	
Kid Willson	July 2, 1918	June 23, 1927	Outfielder	Chicago White Sox	
Paul Wilmet	July 25, 1989	July 29, 1989	Pitcher	Texas Rangers	
Walt Wilmot	April 20, 1888	June 14, 1898	Outfielder	Washington Nationals (1886–1889), Chicago Colts, New York Giants	
Whitey Wilshere	June 24, 1934	May 31, 1936	Pitcher	Philadelphia Athletics	
Terry Wilshusen	April 7, 1973	April 7, 1973	Pitcher	California Angels	
Archie Wilson	September 18, 1951	August 5, 1952	Outfielder	New York Yankees, Washington Senators, Boston Red Sox	
Art Wilson	September 29, 1908	June 12, 1921	Catcher	New York Giants, Chicago Chi-Feds/Whales, Chicago Cubs, Boston Braves, Cleveland Indians	
Artie Wilson	April 18, 1951	May 23, 1951	Utility Infielder	New York Giants	
Bill Wilson (C)	April 30, 1890	June 7, 1898	Catcher	Pittsburgh Alleghenys, Louisville Colonels	
Bill Wilson (OF)	September 24, 1950	September 13, 1955	Outfielder	Chicago White Sox, Philadelphia/Kansas City Athletics	
Bill Wilson (P)	April 8, 1969	September 26, 1973	Pitcher	Philadelphia Phillies	
Bob Wilson	May 17, 1958	May 18, 1958	Outfielder	Los Angeles Dodgers	
Bobby Wilson	April 28, 2008		Catcher	Los Angeles Angels of Anaheim	
Brian Wilson	April 23, 2006		Pitcher	San Francisco Giants	
C. J. Wilson	June 10, 2005		Pitcher	Texas Rangers, Los Angeles Angels of Anaheim	
Charlie Wilson	April 14, 1931	May 25, 1935	Utility infielder	Boston Braves, St. Louis Cardinals	
Chief Wilson	April 15, 1908	October 1, 1916	Outfielder	Pittsburgh Pirates, St. Louis Cardinals	
Craig Wilson (IF/OF)	September 6, 1989	September 29, 1993	Utility player	St. Louis Cardinals, Kansas City Royals	
Craig Wilson (3B)	September 5, 1998	October 1, 2000	Utility infielder	Chicago White Sox	
Craig Wilson (OF/1B)	April 22, 2001	May 11, 2007	Utility player	Pittsburgh Pirates, New York Yankees, Atlanta Braves	
Dan Wilson	September 7, 1992	September 30, 2005	Catcher	Cincinnati Reds, Seattle Mariners	
Desi Wilson	August 7, 1996	September 29, 1996	First baseman	San Francisco Giants	
Don Wilson	September 29, 1966	September 28, 1974	Pitcher	Houston Astros	
Duane Wilson	July 3, 1958	July 12, 1958	Pitcher	Boston Red Sox	
Earl Wilson	July 28, 1959	September 22, 1970	Pitcher	Boston Red Sox, Detroit Tigers, San Diego Padres	
Eddie Wilson	June 21, 1936	October 2, 1937	Outfielder	Brooklyn Dodgers	
Enrique Wilson	September 24, 1997	June 24, 2005	Utility infielder	Cleveland Indians, Pittsburgh Pirates, New York Yankees, Chicago Cubs	
Fin Wilson	September 26, 1914	September 27, 1915	Pitcher	Brooklyn Dodgers	
Frank Wilson	June 20, 1924	June 8, 1928	Outfielder	Boston Braves, Cleveland Indians, St. Louis Browns	
Gary Wilson (2B)	September 27, 1902	September 29, 1902	Second baseman	Boston Red Sox	
Gary Wilson (1970s P)	April 13, 1979	May 11, 1979	Pitcher	Houston Astros	
Gary Wilson (1990s P)	April 28, 1995	June 14, 1995	Pitcher	Pittsburgh Pirates	
George Wilson	April 15, 1952	September 30, 1956	Outfielder	Chicago White Sox, New York Giants, New York Yankees	
George F. Wilson	October 2, 1911	April 22, 1914	Catcher	Detroit Tigers, Boston Red Sox	
Glenn Wilson	April 15, 1982	June 14, 1993	Outfielder	Detroit Tigers, Philadelphia Phillies, Seattle Mariners, Pittsburgh Pirates, Houston Astros	
Grady Wilson	May 15, 1948	July 15, 1948	Shortstop	Pittsburgh Pirates	
Hack Wilson β	September 29, 1923	August 25, 1934	Outfielder	New York Giants, Chicago Cubs, Brooklyn Dodgers, Philadelphia Phillies	
Henry Wilson	October 12, 1898	October 12, 1898	Catcher	Baltimore Orioles (19th century)	
Highball Wilson	September 13, 1899	May 17, 1904	Pitcher	Cleveland Spiders, Philadelphia Athletics, Washington Senators	
Icehouse Wilson	May 31, 1934	May 31, 1934	Pinch hitter	Detroit Tigers	
Jack Wilson (P)	September 9, 1934	September 16, 1942	Pitcher	Philadelphia Athletics, Boston Red Sox, Washington Senators, Detroit Tigers	
Jack Wilson (SS)	April 3, 2001		Shortstop	Pittsburgh Pirates, Seattle Mariners, Atlanta Braves	
Jim Wilson (P)	April 18, 1945	September 14, 1958	Pitcher	Boston Red Sox, St. Louis Browns, Boston/Milwaukee Braves, Baltimore Orioles, Chicago White Sox	
Jim Wilson (1B)	September 13, 1985	September 29, 1989	First baseman	Cleveland Indians, Seattle Mariners	
Jimmie Wilson	April 17, 1923	September 29, 1940	Catcher	Philadelphia Phillies, St. Louis Cardinals, Cincinnati Reds	
John Wilson (1910s P)	June 11, 1913	June 26, 1913	Pitcher	Washington Senators	
John Wilson (1920s P)	May 9, 1927	April 24, 1928	Pitcher	Boston Red Sox	
Josh Wilson	September 7, 2005		Utility infielder	Florida Marlins, Washington Nationals, Tampa Bay Devil Rays, San Diego Padres, Seattle Mariners, Milwaukee Brewers	
Kris Wilson	July 28, 2000	July 17, 2006	Pitcher	Kansas City Royals, New York Yankees	
Les Wilson	July 15, 1911	August 9, 1911	Outfielder	Boston Red Sox	
Max Wilson	September 10, 1940	June 9, 1946	Pitcher	Philadelphia Phillies, Washington Senators	
Mike Wilson (C)	June 4, 1921	September 5, 1921	Catcher	Pittsburgh Pirates	
Mike Wilson (OF)	May 10, 2011		Outfielder	Seattle Mariners	
Mookie Wilson	September 2, 1980	October 6, 1991	Outfielder	New York Mets, Toronto Blue Jays	
Mutt Wilson	September 11, 1920	September 18, 1920	Pitcher	Detroit Tigers	
Neil Wilson	April 17, 1960	April 26, 1960	Catcher	San Francisco Giants	
Nigel Wilson	September 8, 1993	September 29, 1996	Outfielder	Florida Marlins, Cincinnati Reds, Cleveland Indians	
Parke Wilson	July 19, 1893	October 14, 1899	Catcher	New York Giants	
Paul Wilson	April 4, 1996	May 16, 2005	Pitcher	New York Mets, Tampa Bay Devil Rays, Cincinnati Reds	
Pete Wilson	September 15, 1908	October 2, 1909	Pitcher	New York Yankees	
Preston Wilson	May 7, 1998	May 5, 2007	Outfielder	New York Mets, Florida Marlins, Colorado Rockies, Washington Nationals, Houston Astros, St. Louis Cardinals	
Red Wilson	September 22, 1951	September 24, 1960	Catcher	Chicago White Sox, Detroit Tigers, Cleveland Indians	
Roy Wilson	April 18, 1928	April 18, 1928	Pitcher	Chicago White Sox	
Steve Wilson	September 16, 1988	October 2, 1993	Pitcher	Texas Rangers, Chicago Cubs, Los Angeles Dodgers	
Tack Wilson	April 9, 1983	October 3, 1987	Outfielder	Minnesota Twins, California Angels	
Tex Wilson	September 2, 1924	September 16, 1924	Pitcher	Brooklyn Robins	
Tom Wilson (1910s C)	September 8, 1914	September 8, 1914	Catcher	Washington Senators	
Tom Wilson (2000s C)	May 19, 2001	October 3, 2004	Catcher	Oakland Athletics, Toronto Blue Jays, New York Mets, Toronto Blue Jays	
Trevor Wilson	September 5, 1988	September 26, 1998	Pitcher	San Francisco Giants, Anaheim Angels	
Tug Wilson	May 9, 1884	July 21, 1884	Utility player	Brooklyn Atlantics (AA)	
Vance Wilson	April 24, 1999	September 28, 2006	Catcher	New York Mets, Detroit Tigers	
Walter Wilson	April 17, 1945	September 10, 1945	Pitcher	Detroit Tigers	
Willie Wilson	September 4, 1976	May 16, 1994	Outfielder	Kansas City Royals, Oakland Athletics, Chicago Cubs	
Willy Wilson	October 3, 1906	October 3, 1906	Pitcher	Washington Senators	
Zeke Wilson	April 23, 1895	June 28, 1899	Pitcher	Boston Beaneaters, Cleveland Spiders, St. Louis Perfectos	
Hal Wiltse	April 13, 1926	April 20, 1931	Pitcher	Boston Red Sox, St. Louis Browns, Philadelphia Phillies	
Hooks Wiltse	April 21, 1904	September 25, 1915	Pitcher	New York Giants, Brooklyn Tip-Tops	
Snake Wiltse	May 5, 1901	May 18, 1903	Pitcher	Pittsburgh Pirates, Baltimore Orioles (1901–1902), New York Highlanders	
Ed Winceniak	April 25, 1956	May 12, 1957	Utility infielder	Chicago Cubs	
Fred Winchell	September 16, 1909	October 3, 1909	Pitcher	Cleveland Naps	
Scott Winchester	September 8, 1997	August 9, 2001	Pitcher	Cincinnati Reds	
Gordie Windhorn	September 10, 1959	July 10, 1962	Outfielder	New York Yankees, Los Angeles Dodgers, Kansas City Athletics, Los Angeles Angels	
Bill Windle	September 27, 1928	September 27, 1929	First baseman	Pittsburgh Pirates	
Jason Windsor	July 17, 2006	September 27, 2006	Pitcher	Oakland Athletics	
Bobby Wine	September 20, 1960	July 8, 1972	Shortstop	Philadelphia Phillies, Montreal Expos	
Robbie Wine	September 2, 1986	October 3, 1987	Catcher	Houston Astros	
Ed Wineapple	September 15, 1929	September 15, 1929	Pitcher	Washington Senators	
Ralph Winegarner	September 20, 1930	August 21, 1949	Pitcher	Cleveland Indians, St. Louis Browns	
Dave Winfield β	June 19, 1973	October 1, 1995	Outfielder	San Diego Padres, New York Yankees, California Angels, Toronto Blue Jays, Minnesota Twins, Cleveland Indians	
Jim Winford	September 10, 1932	September 22, 1938	Pitcher	St. Louis Cardinals, Brooklyn Dodgers	
Ernie Wingard	May 1, 1924	September 25, 1927	Pitcher	St. Louis Browns	
Ted Wingfield	September 23, 1923	August 27, 1927	Pitcher	Washington Senators, Boston Red Sox	
Al Wingo	September 9, 1919	September 28, 1928	Outfielder	Philadelphia Athletics, Detroit Tigers	
Ed Wingo	October 2, 1920	October 2, 1920	Catcher	Philadelphia Athletics	
Ivey Wingo	April 20, 1911	October 6, 1929	Catcher	St. Louis Cardinals, Cincinnati Reds	
Lave Winham	April 21, 1902	September 21, 1903	Pitcher	Brooklyn Superbas, Pittsburgh Pirates	
George Winkelman	August 2, 1886	August 2, 1886	Pitcher	Washington Nationals (1886–1889)	
Joe Winkelsas	April 10, 1999	June 9, 2006	Pitcher	Atlanta Braves, Milwaukee Brewers	
George Winkleman	August 4, 1883	August 9, 1883	Outfielder	Louisville Eclipse	
George Winn	April 29, 1919	April 28, 1923	Pitcher	Boston Red Sox, Cleveland Indians	
Jim Winn	April 10, 1983	September 6, 1988	Pitcher	Pittsburgh Pirates, Chicago White Sox, Minnesota Twins	
Randy Winn	May 11, 1998	October 3, 2010	Outfielder	Tampa Bay Devil Rays, Seattle Mariners, San Francisco Giants, New York Yankees, St. Louis Cardinals	
Herm Winningham	September 1, 1984	October 3, 1992	Outfielder	New York Mets, Montreal Expos, Cincinnati Reds, Boston Red Sox	
Tom Winsett	April 20, 1930	May 1, 1938	Outfielder	Boston Red Sox, St. Louis Cardinals, Brooklyn Dodgers	
Darrin Winston	September 10, 1997	June 25, 1998	Pitcher	Philadelphia Phillies	
Hank Winston	September 30, 1933	September 24, 1936	Pitcher	Philadelphia Athletics, Brooklyn Dodgers	
George Winter	June 15, 1901	September 18, 1908	Pitcher	Boston Red Sox, Detroit Tigers	
Clarence Winters	August 28, 1924	September 1, 1924	Pitcher	Boston Red Sox	
Jesse Winters	May 3, 1919	July 30, 1923	Pitcher	New York Giants, Philadelphia Phillies	
Matt Winters	May 30, 1989	October 1, 1989	Outfielder	Kansas City Royals	
Alan Wirth	April 7, 1978	July 13, 1980	Pitcher	Oakland Athletics	
Kettle Wirts	July 20, 1921	July 1, 1924	Catcher	Chicago Cubs, Chicago White Sox	
Archie Wise	July 24, 1932	July 27, 1932	Pitcher	Chicago White Sox	
Bill Wise	May 2, 1882	July 17, 1886	Pitcher/Outfielder	Baltimore Orioles (19th century), Washington Nationals (UA), Washington Nationals (1886–1889)	
Casey Wise	April 16, 1957	July 3, 1960	Second baseman	Chicago Cubs, Milwaukee Braves, Detroit Tigers	
DeWayne Wise	April 6, 2000		Outfielder	Toronto Blue Jays, Atlanta Braves, Cincinnati Reds, Chicago White Sox, Florida Marlins	
Hughie Wise	September 26, 1930	September 27, 1930	Catcher	Detroit Tigers	
Matt Wise	August 2, 2000	May 26, 2008	Pitcher	Anaheim Angels, Milwaukee Brewers, New York Mets	
Nick Wise	June 20, 1888	June 20, 1888	Utility player	Boston Beaneaters	
Rick Wise	April 18, 1964	April 10, 1982	Pitcher	Philadelphia Phillies, St. Louis Cardinals, Boston Red Sox, Cleveland Indians, San Diego Padres	
Roy Wise	May 13, 1944	May 13, 1944	Pitcher	Pittsburgh Pirates	
Sam Wise	July 30, 1881	September 29, 1893	Utility infielder	Detroit Wolverines, Boston Red Caps/Beaneaters, Washington Nationals (1886–1889), Buffalo Bisons (PL), Baltimore Orioles (19th century), Washington Senators (1891–99)	
Jack Wisner	September 12, 1919	May 17, 1926	Pitcher	Pittsburgh Pirates, New York Giants	
Phil Wisner	August 30, 1885	August 30, 1885	Shortstop	Washington Senators (1891–99)	
Dave Wissman	September 15, 1964	October 4, 1964	Outfielder	Pittsburgh Pirates	
Whitey Wistert	September 11, 1934	September 25, 1934	Pitcher	Cincinnati Reds	
Tex Wisterzil	April 14, 1914	October 2, 1915	Third baseman	Brooklyn Tip-Tops, Chicago Whales, St. Louis Terriers	
Jay Witasick	July 7, 1996	September 26, 2007	Pitcher	Oakland Athletics, Kansas City Royals, San Diego Padres, New York Yankees, San Francisco Giants, Colorado Rockies, Tampa Bay Devil Rays	
Mickey Witek	April 16, 1940	May 1, 1949	Second baseman	New York Giants, New York Yankees	
Shannon Withem	September 18, 1998	September 18, 1998	Pitcher	Toronto Blue Jays	
Charles Witherow	July 1, 1875	July 1, 1875	Pitcher	Washington Nationals (NA)	
Roy Witherup	May 14, 1906	September 6, 1909	Pitcher	Boston Beaneaters, Washington Senators	
Corky Withrow	September 6, 1963	September 28, 1963	Outfielder	St. Louis Cardinals	
Frank Withrow	April 15, 1920	September 27, 1922	Catcher	Philadelphia Phillies	
Ron Witmeyer	August 25, 1991	October 2, 1991	First baseman	Oakland Athletics	
Bobby Witt	April 10, 1986	October 7, 2001	Pitcher	Texas Rangers, Oakland Athletics, Florida Marlins, St. Louis Cardinals, Tampa Bay Devil Rays, Cleveland Indians, Arizona Diamondbacks	
George Witt	September 1, 1957	June 10, 1962	Pitcher	Pittsburgh Pirates, Los Angeles Angels, Houston Colt .45s	
Kevin Witt	September 15, 1998	September 30, 2006	Utility player	Toronto Blue Jays, San Diego Padres, Detroit Tigers, Tampa Bay Devil Rays	
Mike Witt	April 11, 1981	June 17, 1993	Pitcher	California Angels, New York Yankees	
Whitey Witt	April 12, 1916	August 18, 1926	Outfielder	Philadelphia Athletics, New York Yankees, Brooklyn Robins	
Jerry Witte	September 10, 1946	July 13, 1947	First baseman	St. Louis Browns	
Johnnie Wittig	August 4, 1938	June 22, 1949	Pitcher	New York Giants, Boston Red Sox	
John Wockenfuss	August 11, 1974	August 15, 1985	Utility player	Detroit Tigers, Philadelphia Phillies	
Andy Woehr	September 15, 1923	September 23, 1924	Third baseman	Philadelphia Phillies	
Joe Woerlin	July 21, 1895	July 21, 1895	Shortstop	Washington Nationals (1891–1899)	
Mark Wohlers	August 17, 1991	September 28, 2002	Pitcher	Atlanta Braves, Cincinnati Reds, New York Yankees, Cleveland Indians	
Jim Wohlford	September 1, 1972	October 5, 1986	Outfielder	Kansas City Royals, Milwaukee Brewers, New York Giants, Montreal Expos	
Steve Wojciechowski	July 18, 1995	July 18, 1997	Pitcher	Oakland Athletics	
John Wojcik	September 9, 1962	June 13, 1964	Outfielder	Kansas City Athletics	
Pete Wojey	July 2, 1954	April 25, 1957	Pitcher	Brooklyn Dodgers, Detroit Tigers	
Ed Wojna	June 16, 1985	September 30, 1989	Pitcher	San Diego Padres, Cleveland Indians	
Bob Wolcott	August 18, 1995	July 1, 1999	Pitcher	Seattle Mariners, Arizona Diamondbacks, Boston Red Sox	
Ernie Wolf	September 10, 1912	September 10, 1912	Pitcher	Cleveland Naps	
Jimmy Wolf	May 2, 1882	August 21, 1892	Outfielder	Louisville Eclipse/Colonels, St. Louis Browns (1882–1900)	
Lefty Wolf	July 4, 1921	September 24, 1921	Pitcher	Philadelphia Athletics	
Randy Wolf	June 11, 1999		Pitcher	Philadelphia Phillies, Los Angeles Dodgers, San Diego Padres, Houston Astros, Milwaukee Brewers	
Ray Wolf	July 27, 1927	July 27, 1927	First baseman	Cincinnati Reds	
Ross Wolf	August 10, 2007		Pitcher	Florida Marlins, Oakland Athletics	
Wally Wolf	September 27, 1969	May 5, 1970	Pitcher	California Angels	
Barney Wolfe	April 24, 1903	May 24, 1906	Pitcher	New York Highlanders, Washington Senators	
Brian Wolfe	May 30, 2007		Pitcher	Toronto Blue Jays	
Chuck Wolfe	August 2, 1923	August 19, 1923	Pitcher	Philadelphia Athletics	
Ed Wolfe	April 19, 1952	April 25, 1952	Pitcher	Pittsburgh Pirates	
Harry Wolfe	April 15, 1917	July 16, 1917	Utility player	Chicago Cubs, Pittsburgh Pirates	
Larry Wolfe	September 16, 1977	October 5, 1980	Third baseman	Minnesota Twins, Boston Red Sox	
Polly Wolfe	September 22, 1912	August 31, 1914	Outfielder	Chicago White Sox	
Bill Wolff	September 10, 1902	September 10, 1902	Pitcher	Philadelphia Phillies	
Roger Wolff	September 20, 1941	August 25, 1947	Pitcher	Philadelphia Athletics, Washington Senators, Cleveland Indians, Pittsburgh Pirates	
Mellie Wolfgang	April 18, 1914	July 2, 1918	Pitcher	Chicago White Sox	
Abe Wolstenholme	June 4, 1883	June 11, 1883	Catcher	Philadelphia Quakers	
Harry Wolter	May 14, 1907	September 23, 1917	Outfielder	Cincinnati Reds, Pittsburgh Pirates, St. Louis Cardinals, Boston Red Sox, New York Highlanders/Yankees, Chicago Cubs	
Rynie Wolters	May 18, 1871	April 28, 1873	Pitcher	New York Mutuals, Cleveland Forest Citys, Elizabeth Resolutes	
Harry Wolverton	September 25, 1898	September 25, 1912	Third baseman	Chicago Orphans, Philadelphia Phillies, Washington Senators, Boston Beaneaters, New York Highlanders	
Dooley Womack	April 14, 1966	September 27, 1970	Pitcher	New York Yankees, Houston Astros, Seattle Pilots, Oakland Athletics	
Sid Womack	August 15, 1926	August 15, 1926	Catcher	Boston Braves	
Tony Womack	September 10, 1993	June 24, 2006	Utility player	Pittsburgh Pirates, Arizona Diamondbacks, Colorado Rockies, Chicago Cubs, St. Louis Cardinals, New York Yankees, Cincinnati Reds	
Wood (first name unknown)	September 30, 1874	September 30, 1874	Second baseman	Baltimore Canaries	
Blake Wood	May 12, 2010		Pitcher	Kansas City Royals	
Bob Wood	May 2, 1898	May 6, 1905	Catcher	Cincinnati Reds, Cleveland Blues/Bronchos, Detroit Tigers	
Brandon Wood	April 26, 2007		Third baseman	Los Angeles Angels of Anaheim, Pittsburgh Pirates	
Doc Wood	July 21, 1923	August 4, 1923	Shortstop	Philadelphia Athletics	
Fred Wood	May 14, 1884	September 30, 1885	Catcher	Detroit Wolverines, Buffalo Bisons (NL)	
George Wood	May 1, 1880	September 29, 1892	Outfielder	Worcester Ruby Legs, Detroit Tigers, Philadelphia Phillies, Baltimore Orioles (19th century), Philadelphia Athletics (PL), Cincinnati Reds	
Harry Wood	April 19, 1903	April 27, 1903	Outfielder	Cincinnati Reds	
Jake Wood	April 11, 1961	August 11, 1967	Second baseman	Detroit Tigers, Cincinnati Reds	
Jason Wood	April 1, 1998	April 2, 2008	First baseman	Oakland Athletics, Detroit Tigers, Florida Marlins	
Jimmy Wood	May 8, 1871	November 1, 1873	Second baseman	Chicago White Stockings, Troy Haymakers, Eckford of Brooklyn, Philadelphia White Stockings	
Joe Wood (IF)	May 2, 1943	October 3, 1943	Utility infielder	Detroit Tigers	
Joe Wood (P)	May 1, 1944	May 14, 1944	Pitcher	Boston Red Sox	
John Wood	May 9, 1896	May 9, 1896	Pitcher	St. Louis Browns (1882–1900)	
Ken Wood	April 28, 1948	May 23, 1953	Outfielder	St. Louis Browns, Boston Red Sox, Washington Senators	
Kerry Wood	April 12, 1998		Pitcher	Chicago Cubs, Cleveland Indians, New York Yankees	
Mike Wood	August 21, 2003		Pitcher	Oakland Athletics, Kansas City Royals, Texas Rangers	
Pete Wood	July 15, 1885	September 7, 1889	Pitcher	Buffalo Bisons (NL), Philadelphia Quakers	
Roy Wood	June 16, 1913	June 19, 1915	Utility player	Pittsburgh Pirates, Cleveland Naps/Indians	
Smoky Joe Wood	August 24, 1908	September 24, 1922	Outfielder/Pitcher	Boston Red Sox, Cleveland Indians	
Spades Wood	August 16, 1930	September 21, 1931	Pitcher	Pittsburgh Pirates	
Ted Wood	September 4, 1991	April 22, 1993	Outfielder	San Francisco Giants, Montreal Expos	
Tim Wood	June 25, 2009		Pitcher	Florida Marlins, Pittsburgh Pirates	
Travis Wood	July 1, 2010		Pitcher	Cincinnati Reds	
Wilbur Wood	June 30, 1961	August 22, 1978	Pitcher	Boston Red Sox, Pittsburgh Pirates, Chicago White Sox	
Brad Woodall	July 22, 1994	May 5, 1999	Pitcher	Atlanta Braves, Milwaukee Brewers, Chicago Cubs	
Larry Woodall	May 20, 1920	May 9, 1929	Catcher	Detroit Tigers	
Darrell Woodard	August 6, 1978	October 1, 1978	Second baseman	Oakland Athletics	
Mike Woodard	September 11, 1985	July 10, 1988	Second baseman	San Francisco Giants, Chicago White Sox	
Steve Woodard	July 28, 1997	May 7, 2003	Pitcher	Milwaukee Brewers, Cleveland Indians, Texas Rangers, Boston Red Sox	
Gene Woodburn	July 27, 1911	September 27, 1912	Pitcher	St. Louis Cardinals	
Fred Woodcock	May 17, 1892	June 17, 1892	Pitcher	Pittsburgh Pirates	
George Woodend	April 22, 1944	May 2, 1944	Pitcher	Boston Braves	
Hal Woodeshick	September 14, 1956	September 4, 1967	Pitcher	Detroit Tigers, Cleveland Indians, Washington Senators, Houston Colt .45s/Astros, St. Louis Cardinals	
Red Woodhead	April 15, 1873	September 10, 1879	Third baseman	Baltimore Marylands, Syracuse Stars (NL)	
Gene Woodling	September 23, 1943	September 16, 1962	Outfielder	Cleveland Indians, Pittsburgh Pirates, New York Yankees, Baltimore Orioles, Washington Senators (1961–1971), New York Mets	
Dan Woodman	July 10, 1914	May 12, 1915	Pitcher	Buffalo Buffeds/Blues	
Pete Woodruff	September 19, 1899	October 14, 1899	Outfielder	New York Giants	
Sam Woodruff	April 14, 1904	July 17, 1910	Third baseman	Cincinnati Reds	
Alvis Woods	April 7, 1977	October 2, 1986	Outfielder	Toronto Blue Jays, Minnesota Twins	
Clarence Woods	August 8, 1914	August 16, 1914	Pitcher	Indianapolis Hoosiers (FL)	
Gary Woods	September 14, 1976	September 27, 1985	Outfielder	Oakland Athletics, Toronto Blue Jays, Houston Astros, Chicago Cubs	
Jake Woods	April 8, 2005		Pitcher	Los Angeles Angels of Anaheim, Seattle Mariners	
Jim Woods	September 27, 1957	June 23, 1961	Third baseman	Chicago Cubs, Philadelphia Phillies	
John Woods	September 16, 1924	September 16, 1924	Pitcher	Boston Red Sox	
Pinky Woods	June 20, 1943	September 23, 1945	Pitcher	Boston Red Sox	
Ron Woods	April 22, 1969	September 29, 1974	Outfielder	Detroit Tigers, New York Yankees, Montreal Expos	
Walt Woods	April 20, 1898	April 27, 1900	Pitcher	Chicago Orphans, Louisville Colonels, Pittsburgh Pirates	
Dick Woodson	April 8, 1969	July 8, 1974	Pitcher	Minnesota Twins, New York Yankees	
Kerry Woodson	July 19, 1992	September 12, 1992	Pitcher	Seattle Mariners	
Tracy Woodson	April 7, 1987	October 2, 1993	Third baseman	Los Angeles Dodgers, St. Louis Cardinals	
Chris Woodward	June 7, 1999		Shortstop	Toronto Blue Jays, New York Mets, Atlanta Braves, Seattle Mariners, Boston Red Sox	
Frank Woodward	April 17, 1918	April 29, 1923	Pitcher	Philadelphia Phillies, St. Louis Cardinals, Washington Senators, Chicago White Sox	
Rob Woodward	September 5, 1985	September 26, 1988	Pitcher	Boston Red Sox	
Woody Woodward	September 9, 1963	September 28, 1971	Shortstop	Milwaukee/Atlanta Braves, Cincinnati Reds	
Mark Woodyard	September 17, 2005	October 1, 2005	Pitcher	Detroit Tigers	
Floyd Wooldridge	May 1, 1955	August 15, 1955	Pitcher	St. Louis Cardinals	
Junior Wooten	September 16, 1947	September 30, 1948	Outfielder	Washington Senators	
Shawn Wooten	August 19, 2000	May 26, 2005	Utility player	Anaheim Angels, Philadelphia Phillies, Boston Red Sox	
Fred Worden	September 28, 1914	September 28, 1914	Pitcher	Philadelphia Athletics	
Favel Wordsworth	April 28, 1873	August 7, 1873	Shortstop	Elizabeth Resolutes	
Chuck Workman	September 18, 1938	September 27, 1946	Outfielder	Cleveland Indians, Boston Braves, Pittsburgh Pirates	
Hank Workman	September 4, 1950	October 1, 1950	First baseman	New York Yankees	
Hoge Workman	June 27, 1924	September 1, 1924	Pitcher	Boston Red Sox	
Ralph Works	May 1, 1909	April 28, 1913	Pitcher	Detroit Tigers, Cincinnati Reds	
Vance Worley	July 24, 2010		Pitcher	Philadelphia Phillies	
Mark Worrell	June 3, 2008		Pitcher	St. Louis Cardinals, Baltimore Orioles	
Tim Worrell	June 25, 1993	June 27, 2006	Pitcher	San Diego Padres, Detroit Tigers, Cleveland Indians, Oakland Athletics, Baltimore Orioles, Chicago Cubs, San Francisco Giants, Philadelphia Phillies, Arizona Diamondbacks	
Todd Worrell	August 28, 1985	September 25, 1997	Pitcher	St. Louis Cardinals, Los Angeles Dodgers	
Danny Worth	May 16, 2010		Shortstop	Detroit Tigers	
Herb Worth	July 29, 1872	July 29, 1872	Outfielder	Brooklyn Atlantics	
Rich Wortham	May 3, 1978	July 23, 1983	Pitcher	Chicago White Sox, Oakland Athletics	
Al Worthington	July 6, 1953	October 2, 1969	Pitcher	New York/San Francisco Giants, Boston Red Sox, Chicago White Sox, Cincinnati Reds, Minnesota Twins	
Craig Worthington	April 26, 1988	May 14, 1996	Third baseman	Baltimore Orioles, Cleveland Indians, Cincinnati Reds, Texas Rangers	
Red Worthington	April 14, 1931	September 14, 1934	Outfielder	Boston Braves, St. Louis Cardinals	
Chuck Wortman	July 20, 1916	August 29, 1918	Shortstop	Chicago Cubs	
Ron Wotus	September 3, 1983	September 30, 1984	Shortstop	Pittsburgh Pirates	
Jimmy Woulfe	May 16, 1884	July 23, 1884	Outfielder	Cincinnati Red Stockings (AA), Pittsburgh Alleghenys	
Ab Wright	April 20, 1935	October 1, 1944	Outfielder	Cleveland Indians, Boston Braves	
Al Wright	April 25, 1933	May 5, 1933	Second baseman	Boston Braves	
Bill Wright	September 16, 1887	September 16, 1887	Catcher	Washington Nationals (1886–1889)	
Bob Wright	September 21, 1915	September 24, 1915	Pitcher	Chicago Cubs	
Chase Wright	April 17, 2007		Pitcher	New York Yankees	
Clyde Wright	June 15, 1966	September 26, 1975	Pitcher	California Angels, Milwaukee Brewers, Texas Rangers	
Cy Wright	June 30, 1916	July 8, 1916	Shortstop	Chicago White Sox	
Dan Wright	July 27, 2001	May 1, 2004	Pitcher	Chicago White Sox	
Dave Wright	July 22, 1895	September 28, 1897	Pitcher	Pittsburgh Pirates, Chicago Colts	
David Wright	July 21, 2004		Third baseman	New York Mets	
Dick Wright	June 30, 1915	July 9, 1915	Catcher	Brooklyn Tip-Tops	
Ed Wright	July 29, 1945	September 4, 1952	Pitcher	Boston Braves, Philadelphia Athletics	
Gene Wright	October 5, 1901	April 18, 1904	Pitcher	Brooklyn Superbas, Cleveland Bronchos/Naps, St. Louis Browns	
George Wright (SS) β	May 5, 1871	October 2, 1882	Shortstop	Boston Red Stockings/Red Caps, Providence Grays	
George Wright (OF)	April 10, 1982	October 5, 1986	Outfielder	Texas Rangers, Montreal Expos	
Glenn Wright	April 15, 1924	June 4, 1935	Shortstop	Pittsburgh Pirates, Brooklyn Robins/Dodgers, Chicago White Sox	
Harry Wright β	May 5, 1871	September 29, 1877	Outfielder	Boston Red Stockings/Red Caps	
Jamey Wright	July 3, 1996		Pitcher	Colorado Rockies, Milwaukee Brewers, St. Louis Cardinals, Kansas City Royals, San Francisco Giants, Texas Rangers, Cleveland Indians, Seattle Mariners	
Jaret Wright	June 24, 1997	April 29, 2007	Pitcher	Cleveland Indians, San Diego Padres, Atlanta Braves, New York Yankees, Baltimore Orioles	
Jim Wright (1920s P)	September 14, 1927	May 4, 1928	Pitcher	St. Louis Browns	
Jim Wright (1970s P)	April 15, 1978	June 6, 1979	Pitcher	Boston Red Sox	
Jim Wright (1980s P)	April 22, 1981	May 15, 1982	Pitcher	Kansas City Royals	
Joe Wright	July 14, 1895	September 18, 1896	Outfielder	Louisville Colonels, Pittsburgh Pirates	
Ken Wright	April 10, 1970	April 28, 1974	Pitcher	Kansas City Royals, New York Yankees	
Lucky Wright	April 18, 1909	May 18, 1909	Pitcher	Cleveland Naps	
Mel Wright	April 17, 1954	July 18, 1961	Pitcher	St. Louis Cardinals, Chicago Cubs	
Pat Wright	July 11, 1890	July 11, 1890	Second baseman	Chicago Colts	
Rasty Wright (OF)	April 17, 1890	October 4, 1890	Outfielder	Syracuse Stars (AA), Cleveland Spiders	
Rasty Wright (P)	June 22, 1917	October 4, 1923	Pitcher	St. Louis Browns	
Ricky Wright	July 28, 1982	August 5, 1986	Pitcher	Los Angeles Dodgers, Texas Rangers	
Ron Wright	April 14, 2002	April 14, 2002	Designated hitter	Seattle Mariners	
Roy Wright	September 30, 1956	September 30, 1956	Pitcher	New York Giants	
Sam Wright	April 19, 1875	September 23, 1881	Shortstop	New Haven Elm Citys, Boston Red Caps, Cincinnati Reds (1876–1880)	
Taffy Wright	April 10, 1938	September 16, 1949	Outfielder	Washington Senators, Chicago White Sox, Philadelphia Athletics	
Tom Wright	September 15, 1948	April 18, 1956	Outfielder	Boston Red Sox, St. Louis Browns, Chicago White Sox, Washington Senators	
Wesley Wright	March 31, 2008		Pitcher	Houston Astros	
Russ Wrightstone	April 19, 1920	September 29, 1928	Utility player	Philadelphia Phillies, New York Giants	
Zeke Wrigley	August 31, 1896	October 14, 1899	Shortstop	Washington Senators (1891–99), New York Giants, Brooklyn Superbas	
Rick Wrona	September 3, 1988	July 22, 1994	Catcher	Chicago Cubs, Cincinnati Reds, Chicago White Sox, Milwaukee Brewers	
Michael Wuertz	April 5, 2004		Pitcher	Chicago Cubs, Oakland Athletics	
Yats Wuestling	June 15, 1929	September 28, 1930	Shortstop	Detroit Tigers, New York Yankees	
Kelly Wunsch	April 3, 2000	July 7, 2005	Pitcher	Chicago White Sox, Los Angeles Dodgers	
Frank Wurm	September 4, 1944	September 4, 1944	Pitcher	Brooklyn Dodgers	
Joe Wyatt	September 11, 1924	September 13, 1924	Outfielder	Cleveland Indians	
John Wyatt	September 8, 1961	May 1, 1969	Pitcher	Kansas City Athletics, Boston Red Sox, New York Yankees, Detroit Tigers, Oakland Athletics	
Whit Wyatt	September 26, 1929	July 18, 1945	Pitcher	Detroit Tigers, Chicago White Sox, Cleveland Indians, Brooklyn Dodgers, Philadelphia Phillies	
Weldon Wyckoff	April 19, 1913	May 8, 1918	Pitcher	Philadelphia Athletics, Boston Red Sox	
Ren Wylie	August 11, 1882	August 11, 1882	Outfielder	Pittsburgh Alleghenys	
Willis Wyman	June 10, 1884	August 9, 1884	Outfielder	Kansas City Cowboys (UA), Chicago Browns/Pittsburgh Stogies	
Butch Wynegar	April 6, 1976	May 24, 1988	Catcher	Minnesota Twins, New York Yankees, California Angels	
Early Wynn β	September 13, 1939	September 13, 1963	Pitcher	Washington Senators, Cleveland Indians, Chicago White Sox	
Jimmy Wynn	July 10, 1963	September 27, 1977	Outfielder	Houston Astros, Los Angeles Dodgers, Atlanta Braves, New York Yankees, Milwaukee Brewers	
Bill Wynne	August 31, 1894	August 31, 1894	Pitcher	Washington Senators (1891–99)	
Billy Wynne	August 6, 1967	April 30, 1971	Pitcher	New York Mets, Chicago White Sox, California Angels	
Marvell Wynne	June 15, 1983	October 3, 1990	Outfielder	Pittsburgh Pirates, San Diego Padres, Chicago Cubs	
Johnny Wyrostek	September 10, 1942	September 26, 1954	Outfielder	Pittsburgh Pirates, Philadelphia Phillies, Cincinnati Reds	
Hank Wyse	September 7, 1942	June 14, 1951	Pitcher	Chicago Cubs, Philadelphia Athletics, Washington Senators	
Biff Wysong	August 10, 1930	May 7, 1932	Pitcher	Cincinnati Reds	
