= Grantfork, Illinois =

- Village
- Location in Madison County, Illinois
- Coordinates: 38°49′45″N 89°40′02″W
- Country: United States
- State: Illinois
- County: Madison
- Townships: Leef, Saline
- Incorporated: February 18, 1886

Area
  - Total: 0.37 sq mi (0.97 km^{2})
  - Land: 0.37 sq mi (0.95 km^{2})
  - Water: 0.0077 sq mi (0.02 km^{2})
- Elevation: 532 ft (162 m)

Population (2020)
  - Total: 341
  - Density: 926.9/sq mi (357.87/km^{2})
- Time zone: UTC-6 (CST)
  - Summer (DST): UTC-5 (CDT)
- ZIP code: 62249 (Highland)
- Area code: 618
- FIPS code: 17-30978
- GNIS feature ID: 2398192
- Website: villageofgrantfork.wixsite.com/home

Grantfork is a village in Madison County, Illinois, United States. The population was 341 as of the 2020 census. It is part of the St. Louis Metropolitan Area.

== History ==
The settlement was platted as Fitz-James Crossing in 1837 and recorded as Fitz-James in 1840. A new plat filed in 1866 named it Saline. In 1870, postal authorities required a different post-office name because another Illinois community already used Saline. Residents chose Grantfork to honor President Ulysses S. Grant and to refer to the settlement's location at a fork of two creeks.

The village was incorporated under the legal name Saline on February 18, 1886. Although the post office and local newspapers used Grantfork, county and state documents continued to use Saline until the village's legal name was later changed.

== Geography ==
Grantfork is located in eastern Madison County. Illinois Route 160 passes through the west side of the village, leading south 6 miles (10 km) to Highland and north 4 miles (6 km) to Illinois Route 140. Edwardsville, the county seat, is 16 miles (26 km) to the west, and downtown St. Louis is 36 miles (58 km) to the southwest.

According to the U.S. Census Bureau, Grantfork has a total area of 0.38 square miles (0.98 km^{2}), of which 0.008 square miles (0.02 km^{2}), or 2.13%, are water. The East Fork of Silver Creek, part of the Kaskaskia River watershed leading south to the Mississippi River, passes through the southeast corner of the village.

== Demographics ==
Historical population
Census	Pop.	Note	%±
1900	151		—
1910	112		−25.8%
1920	222		98.2%
1930	80		−64.0%
1940	130		62.5%
1950	162		24.6%
1960	134		−17.3%
1970	162		20.9%
1980	268		65.4%
1990	273		1.9%
2000	254		−7.0%
2010	337		32.7%
2020	341		1.2%
U.S. Decennial Census

As of the census of 2000, there were 254 people, 101 households, and 67 families residing in the village. The population density was 1,112.1 inhabitants per square mile (429.4/km^{2}). There were 103 housing units at an average density of 451.0 per square mile (174.1/km^{2}). The racial makeup of the village was 99.21% White, 0.39% Native American, and 0.39% from two or more races. Hispanic or Latino of any race were 0.39% of the population.

There were 101 households, out of which 37.6% had children under the age of 18 living with them, 50.5% were married couples living together, 8.9% had a female householder with no husband present, and 32.7% were non-families. 29.7% of all households were made up of individuals, and 8.9% had someone living alone who was 65 years of age or older. The average household size was 2.51 and the average family size was 3.09.

In the village, the population was spread out, with 29.1% under the age of 18, 7.1% from 18 to 24, 32.3% from 25 to 44, 22.4% from 45 to 64, and 9.1% who were 65 years of age or older. The median age was 36 years. For every 100 females, there were 92.4 males. For every 100 females age 18 and over, there were 97.8 males.

The median income for a household in the village was $42,917, and the median income for a family was $48,750. Males had a median income of $36,563 versus $21,458 for females. The per capita income for the village was $17,415. About 3.1% of families and 4.4% of the population were below the poverty line, including none of those under the age of eighteen or sixty five or over.

== Education ==
Grantfork is served by Highland Community Unit School District 5, which operates Grantfork Elementary School in the village.

== Notable person ==
- Rube Peters, pitcher for the Chicago White Sox and Brooklyn Tip-Tops; born in Grantfork
