= 1928 San Francisco Seals season =

1928 San Francisco Seals
- League: Pacific Coast League
- Ballpark: Recreation Park
- City: San Francisco
- Record: 120–71
- League place: 1st
- Managers: Nick Williams

The 1928 San Francisco Seals season was the 26th season in the history of the San Francisco Seals baseball team. The 1926 team won the Pacific Coast League (PCL) pennant with a 120–71 record. Nick Williams was the team's manager. In the 1928 PCL championship series, the Seals defeated the Sacramento Solons four games to two.

The 1925 Seals were selected in 2003 by a panel of minor league experts as the ninth best team in the PCL's 100-year history. The team was also selected by Minor League Baseball as the 50th best team in minor league history. According to one published account, the Seals in 1928 were "considered the second most valuable franchise in sports, second only to the New York Yankees."

The team's outfield trio of Smead Jolley, Earl Averill, and Roy Johnson, rated by some as the best minor league outfield in history, combined for 813 hits, 103 home runs, and 437 RBIs. Right fielder Jolley won the PCL's Triple Crown, leading the league with a .404 batting average, 45 home runs, 188 RBIs, 309 hits, and 516 total bases. Center fielder Averill, a Baseball Hall of Fame inductee, led the league with 178 runs and finished second behind Jolly with 173 RBIs. Left fielder Johnson hit .360 and led the PCL with 16 triples. After the 1928 season, the Seals sold the three outfielders for a total of $135,000.

Though remembered mostly for their offensive output and .308 team batting average, the 1928 Seals also had a strong pitching staff. Dutch Ruether, a native of Alameda, California, led the PCL with 29 wins and 28 complete games. Elmer Jacobs won 22 games, had a streak of 35 scoreless innings, and led the league with 159 strikeouts and a 2.56 earned run average. Duster Mails, a native of San Quentin, California, won 20 games and struck out 152 batters.

== 1928 PCL standings ==
Team	W	L	Pct.	GB
San Francisco Seals	120	71	.622	--
Sacramento Solons	112	79	.586	8.0
Hollywood Stars	112	79	.586	8.0
Mission Reds	99	92	.518	21.0
Oakland Oaks	91	100	.476	29.0
Los Angeles Angels	87	104	.455	33.0
Portland Beavers	79	112	.414	41.0
Seattle Indians	64	127	.335	56.0

== Players ==
=== Batting ===
Note: Pos = Position; G = Games played; AB = At bats; H = Hits; Avg. = Batting average; HR = Home runs; RBI = Runs batted in

Pos	Player	G	AB	H	Avg.	HR	RBI
RF	Smead Jolley	191	765	309	.404	45	188
LF	Roy Johnson	170	650	234	.360	22	76
CF	Earl Averill	189	763	270	.354	36	173
1B, P	Sloppy Thurston	129	420	146	.348	24	
2B, 1B	Gus Suhr	191	741	233	.314	22	133
SS	Hal Rhyne	185	692	216	.312	6	106
3B	Babe Pinelli	114	422	131	.310	2	81
3B	Frankie Crosetti	96	326	81	.248	4	22
C	Joe Sprinz	158	505	119	.236	4	49

=== Pitching ===
Note: G = Games pitched; IP = Innings pitched; W = Wins; L = Losses; PCT = Win percentage; ERA = Earned run average

Player	G	IP	W	L	PCT	ERA	SO
Dutch Ruether	36	303	29	7	.806	3.03	110
Elmer Jacobs	37	277	22	8	.733	2.57	159
Duster Mails	45	277	20	12	.625	3.96	152
Ollie Mitchell	35	200	13	11	.542	3.87	66
Buckshot May	50	205	11	13	.458	4.74	90
Dick Moudy	39	213	10	10	.500	4.10	93
Sloppy Thurston	26	137	9	7	.563	4.60	37
