= Ed Gagnier =

Ed Gagnier may refer to:

- Ed Gagnier (baseball) (1882–1946), American baseball player
- Ed Gagnier (gymnast) (born 1936), American gymnast and coach
