= John McGraw (pitcher) =

American baseball player (1890-1967)

- Pitcher
- Born: December 8, 1890; Mount Nebo, Pennsylvania, U.S.
- Died: April 27, 1967 (aged 76); Torrance, California, U.S.
- Batted: Right Threw: Right

MLB debut
- July 29, 1914, for the Brooklyn Tip-Tops

Last MLB appearance
- July 29, 1914, for the Brooklyn Tip-Tops

MLB statistics
- Games: 1
- Innings pitched: 2.0
- Strikeouts: 2
- Stats at Baseball Reference

Teams
- Brooklyn Tip-Tops (1914)

John McGraw (born Roy Elmer Hoar or Heir, December 8, 1890 – April 27, 1967) was an American Federal League pitcher. McGraw played for the Brooklyn Tip-Tops in the 1914 season. He played just 1 game in his career, pitching in 2 innings, and striking out 2.

McGraw was born in Mount Nebo, Pennsylvania, and died in Torrance, California.

It had long been believed that he changed his name to John McGraw, after the more famous player/manager John McGraw, in order to maintain his amateur status while pitching for the Tip-Tops. However, this is not supported by any evidence, and is contradicted by his use of Hoar or Heir while pitching for minor league teams. McGraw attended Carnegie Mellon University but did not graduate.
