= Joe Vernon =

American baseball player (1889–1955)

- Pitcher
- Born: November 25, 1889; Mansfield, Massachusetts, U.S.
- Died: March 13, 1955 (aged 65); Philadelphia, Pennsylvania, U.S.
- Batted: Right Threw: Right

MLB debut
- July 20, 1912, for the Chicago Cubs

Last MLB appearance
- May 15, 1914, for the Brooklyn Tip-Tops

MLB statistics
- Win–loss record: 0–0
- Earned run average: 11.05
- Strikeouts: 1
- Stats at Baseball Reference

Teams
- Chicago Cubs (1912); Brooklyn Tip-Tops (1914)

Joseph Henry Vernon (November 25, 1889 – March 13, 1955) was an American pitcher in Major League Baseball. He played for the Chicago Cubs and Brooklyn Tip-Tops.
