= Al Tesch =

American baseball player (1891-1947)

- Second baseman
- Born: January 27, 1891; Jersey City, New Jersey, U.S.
- Died: August 3, 1947 (aged 56); Jersey City, New Jersey, U.S.
- Batted: Both Threw: Right

MLB debut
- August 21, 1915, for the Brooklyn Tip-Tops

Last MLB appearance
- September 3, 1915, for the Brooklyn Tip-Tops

MLB statistics
- Batting average: .286
- Home runs: 0
- Runs batted in: 2
- Stats at Baseball Reference

Teams
- Brooklyn Tip-Tops (1915)

Al Tesch (January 27, 1891 – August 3, 1947), nicknamed "Tiny", was an American professional baseball player who was positioned at second base for the Brooklyn Tip-Tops in eight games in 1915.

== Teams ==
- Brooklyn Tip-Tops 1915

== Sources ==
- Career statistics from Baseball Reference · Baseball Reference (Minors) · Retrosheet · Baseball Almanac
