= Byron Houck =

American baseball player (1891-1969)

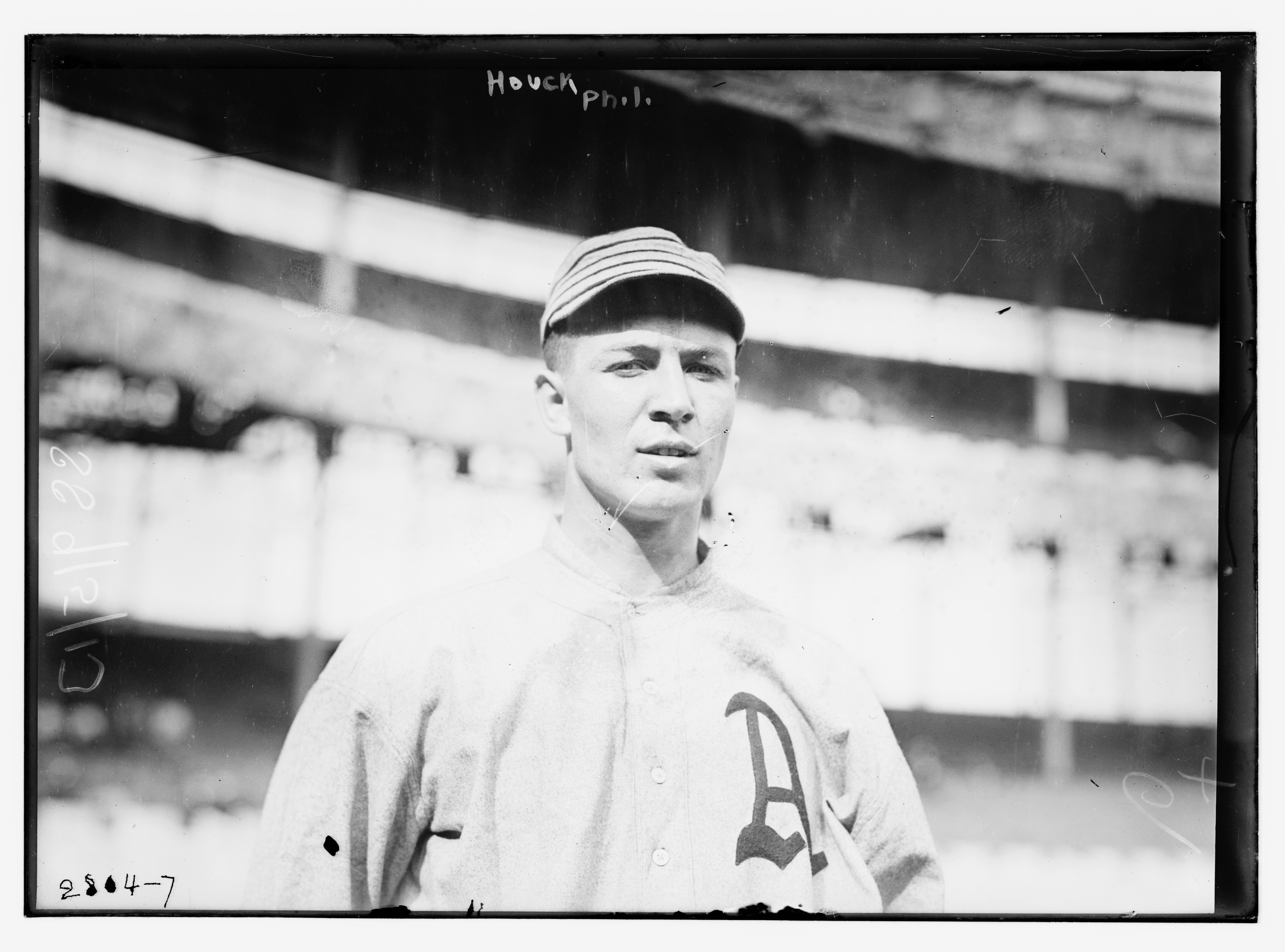
- Pitcher
- Born: Byron Simon Houck; August 28, 1891; Prosper, Minnesota, U.S.
- Died: June 17, 1969 (aged 77); Santa Cruz, California, U.S.
- Batted: Right Threw: Right

MLB debut
- May 15, 1912, for the Philadelphia Athletics

Last MLB appearance
- August 27, 1918, for the St. Louis Browns

MLB statistics
- Win–loss record: 26–24
- Earned run average: 3.30
- Strikeouts: 224
- Stats at Baseball Reference

Teams
- Philadelphia Athletics (1912–1914); Brooklyn Tip-Tops (1914); St. Louis Browns (1918)

Byron Simon Houck (August 28, 1891 – June 17, 1969) was an American professional baseball pitcher and cinematographer. He played in Major League Baseball for the Philadelphia Athletics, Brooklyn Tip-Tops, and St. Louis Browns from 1912 to 1914 and in 1918. After his baseball career, he worked on Buster Keaton's production team as a camera operator.

== Early life ==
Houck was born in Prosper, Minnesota. He was the fifth of six children. His family moved to Portland, Oregon, when he was young. He attended Washington High School in Portland, and pitched for the school's baseball team all four years. In his senior year, he was voted president of the athletic association. Houck graduated from high school in 1910 and enrolled at the University of Oregon and played college baseball for the Oregon Ducks. He was a member of Kappa Sigma at Oregon.

== Professional baseball career ==
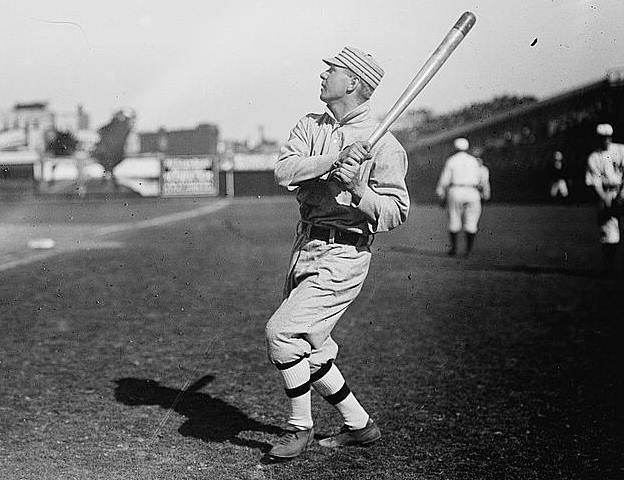
Houck in 1912

Houck signed with the Spokane Indians of the Class B Northwestern League in July 1911. After the season, the Philadelphia Athletics selected Houck in the Rule 5 draft. He made his major league debut with the Athletics in 1912. He pitched to a 8–8 win–loss record with a 2.94 earned run average (ERA). He was a member of the 1913 World Series champions, pitching to a 14–6 record and a 4.14 ERA in 1913, but he did not appear in the series.

In 1914, after making three appearances for the Athletics, he was released to the Baltimore Orioles of the International League. Houck refused to report to Baltimore, and jumped to the Brooklyn Tip-Tops of the outlaw Federal League. He signed a three-year contract with Brooklyn paying him $3,500 per season ($112,500 in current dollar terms). He pitched to a 2–6 record with a 3.13 ERA for Brooklyn. In 1915, Brooklyn assigned him to the Colonial League, a minor league affiliated with the Federal League, and he played for the New Haven White Wings and Pawtucket Rovers. Brooklyn gave him his unconditional release after the 1915 season, and Houck accepted a payout of half of his salary for the 1916 season.

In 1916, following the collapse of the Federal League, Houck's rights reverted to the Athletics, and they allowed Houck to become a free agent. He signed with the Portland Beavers of the Pacific Coast League (PCL). He had a 17–19 record and a 3.36 ERA in 1916. Houck returned to Portland in 1917, but struggled at the beginning of the season. He improved to finish the season with a 23–15 record and a 2.21 ERA. After the 1917 season, he was drafted by the St. Louis Browns for the 1918 season. He had a 2–4 record and a 2.39 ERA for the Browns. In February 1919, St. Louis sold Houck to the Vernon Tigers of the PCL. He had a 19–16 record and a 3.88 ERA in 1919.

In 1920, Babe Borton, Houck's teammate with Vernon, was caught bribing opponents to throw games. He alleged that the plan was discussed at Louis Anger's house with Houck present. Houck was not punished by the PCL. He finished the 1920 season with a 10–17 record and a 2.62 ERA. Houck played semi-professional baseball in 1921, and briefly returned to the PCL to pitch for Vernon and Portland in 1922.

== Film career ==
In 1919, Fatty Arbuckle purchased the Tigers, and he made Anger the team president. Houck's first wife and Anger's wife were sisters. This connection led to Houck working as a camera operator on Buster Keaton's silent films. He worked on the 1924 films Sherlock Jr. and The Navigator, the 1925 film Seven Chances, and the 1926 film The General.

== Personal life ==
Houck married Kittye Isaacs in September 1913. She died in March 1923. He remarried to Rose Carr in 1927.

Houck died in Santa Cruz, California, on June 17, 1969. He was interred at Rosedale Cemetery in Los Angeles.
