= Bill Herring =

American baseball player (1893-1962)

- Pitcher
- Born: October 31, 1893; New York City, US
- Died: September 10, 1962 (aged 68); Honesdale, Pennsylvania, US
- Batted: Right Threw: Right

MLB debut
- June 26, 1915, for the Brooklyn Tip-Tops

Last MLB appearance
- June 30, 1915, for the Brooklyn Tip-Tops

MLB statistics
- Win–loss record: 0-0
- Strikeouts: 3
- Earned run average: 15.00
- Stats at Baseball Reference

Teams
- Brooklyn Tip-Tops (1915)

William Francis "Smoke" Herring (October 31, 1893 – September 10, 1962) was an American Major League Baseball pitcher. He pitched in three games for the Brooklyn Tip-Tops of the Federal League in 1915.

== Sources ==
- Career statistics from Baseball Reference · Baseball Reference (Minors) · Retrosheet · Baseball Almanac
