= Bill Upham =

American baseball player (1888-1959)

- Pitcher
- Born: April 4, 1888; Akron, Ohio, U.S.
- Died: September 14, 1959 (aged 71); Newark, New Jersey, U.S.
- Batted: Switch Threw: Right

MLB debut
- April 10, 1915, for the Brooklyn Tip-Tops

Last MLB appearance
- June 26, 1918, for the Boston Braves

MLB statistics
- Win–loss record: 8-9
- Earned run average: 3.62
- Strikeouts: 54
- Stats at Baseball Reference

Teams
- Brooklyn Tip-Tops (1915); Boston Braves (1918)

William Lawrence Upham (April 4, 1888 in Akron, Ohio – September 14, 1959 in Newark, New Jersey) was an American pitcher in Major League Baseball in 1915 and 1918.
