= Rube Peters =

American baseball player (1885–1965)

- Pitcher
- Born: March 15, 1885; Grantfork, Illinois, U.S.
- Died: February 7, 1965 (aged 79); Pompton Plains, New Jersey, U.S.
- Batted: Right Threw: Right

MLB debut
- April 13, 1912, for the Chicago White Sox

Last MLB appearance
- September 21, 1914, for the Brooklyn Tip-Tops

MLB statistics
- Win–loss record: 7–8
- Earned run average: 4.06
- Strikeouts: 52
- Stats at Baseball Reference

Teams
- Chicago White Sox (1912); Brooklyn Tip-Tops (1914)

Otto Casper "Rube" Peters (March 15, 1885 – February 7, 1965) was an American pitcher in Major League Baseball. He played for the Chicago White Sox and Brooklyn Tip-Tops.
