= Frank Kane (baseball) =

American baseball player (1895–1962)

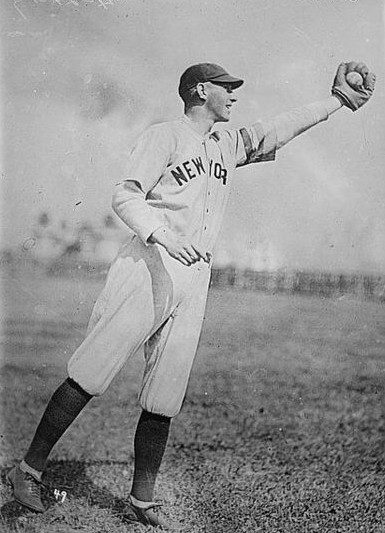
- Outfielder
- Born: March 9, 1895; Whitman, Massachusetts, U.S.
- Died: December 2, 1962 (aged 67); Brockton, Massachusetts, U.S.
- Batted: Left Threw: Right

MLB debut
- September 13, 1915, for the Brooklyn Tip-Tops

Last MLB appearance
- April 28, 1919, for the New York Yankees

MLB statistics
- Batting average: .182
- Home runs: 0
- Runs batted in: 2
- Stats at Baseball Reference

Teams
- Brooklyn Tip-Tops (1915); New York Yankees (1919)

Frank Kane (March 9, 1895, in Whitman, Massachusetts – December 2, 1962, in Brockton, Massachusetts), nicknamed "Sugar", was an American outfielder in Major League Baseball in 1915 and 1919. He played as an outfielder in Minor League Baseball until 1928.
