= Mount Nebo, Allegheny County, Pennsylvania =

Unincorporated community in Pennsylvania, U.S.

Coordinates: 40°33′10″N 80°06′18″W

Mount Nebo is an unincorporated community in Allegheny County, in the U.S. state of Pennsylvania.

== History ==
The community was named after Mount Nebo, a place mentioned in the Bible.
