= Bill Chappelle =

American baseball player (1881–1944)

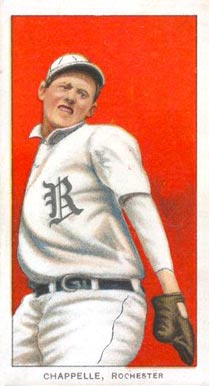
- Chappelle depicted on a T206 baseball card with Rochester
- Pitcher
- Born: March 22, 1881; Waterloo, New York, U.S.
- Died: December 31, 1944 (aged 63); Mineola, New York, U.S.
- Batted: Right Threw: Right

MLB debut
- August 20, 1908, for the Boston Doves

Last MLB appearance
- September 24, 1914, for the Brooklyn Tip-Tops

MLB statistics
- Earned run average: 2.38
- Strikeouts: 62
- Win–loss record: 7–7
- Stats at Baseball Reference

Teams
- Boston Doves (1908–1909); Cincinnati Reds (1909); Brooklyn Tip-Tops (1914)

Bill Chappelle (March 22, 1881 – December 31, 1944) was an American professional baseball pitcher. He played in the major leagues in 1908, 1909, and 1914.

He was born in Waterloo, New York, and died in Mineola, New York.

== Sources ==
- Career statistics from Baseball Reference · Baseball Reference (Minors) · Retrosheet · Baseball Almanac
