= Ty Helfrich =

American baseball player

- Second baseman
- Born: October 9, 1890; Pleasantville, New Jersey, U.S.
- Died: March 18, 1955 (aged 64); Pleasantville, New Jersey, U.S.
- Batted: Right Threw: Right

MLB debut
- June 30, 1915, for the Brooklyn Tip-Tops

Last MLB appearance
- September 24, 1915, for the Brooklyn Tip-Tops

MLB statistics
- Batting average: .240
- Home runs: 0
- Runs batted in: 5
- Stats at Baseball Reference

Teams
- Brooklyn Tip-Tops (1915)

Emory Wilbur "Ty" Helfrich (born October 9, 1890, in Pleasantville, New Jersey; died March 18, 1955, in Pleasantville, New Jersey) played second base for the 1915 Brooklyn Tip-Tops of the Federal League. That season was the only season he played Major League Baseball. Prior to his baseball career, he attended Lafayette College in Easton, Pennsylvania. After baseball, he returned to South Jersey to become a high school coach.
