= Dave Howard (second baseman) =

American baseball player (1889-1956)

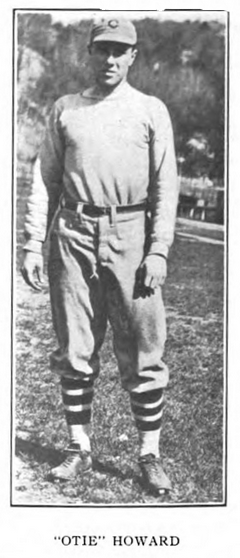
- Second baseman
- Born: May 1, 1889; Washington, D.C., U.S.
- Died: January 26, 1956 (aged 66); Dallas, Texas, U.S.
- Batted: Right Threw: Right

MLB debut
- May 8, 1912, for the Washington Senators

Last MLB appearance
- July 3, 1915, for the Brooklyn Tip-Tops

MLB statistics
- Batting average: .222
- Home runs: 0
- Runs batted in: 1
- Stats at Baseball Reference

Teams
- Washington Senators (1912); Brooklyn Tip-Tops (1915)

David Austin Howard (May 1, 1889 – January 26, 1956) nicknamed "Del", was an American professional baseball player. He played two seasons in Major League Baseball in 1912 and 1915, primarily as a second baseman. He graduated from Cornell University in 1911 and was elected for membership in the Sphinx Head Society.

== Sources ==
- Career statistics from Baseball Reference · Baseball Reference (Minors) · Retrosheet · Baseball Almanac
