= Rudy Sommers =

American baseball player (1886–1949)

- Pitcher
- Born: October 30, 1886; Cincinnati, Ohio, U.S.
- Died: March 18, 1949 (aged 61); Louisville, Kentucky, U.S.
- Batted: Switch Threw: Left

MLB debut
- September 8, 1912, for the Chicago Cubs

Last MLB appearance
- July 13, 1927, for the Boston Red Sox

MLB statistics
- Win–loss record: 2–8
- Earned run average: 4.81
- Strikeouts: 44
- Stats at Baseball Reference

Teams
- Chicago Cubs (1912); Brooklyn Tip-Tops (1914); Boston Red Sox (1926–1927)

Rudolph Sommers (October 30, 1886 – March 18, 1949) was an American pitcher in Major League Baseball who played for the Chicago Cubs, Brooklyn Tip-Tops and Boston Red Sox in all or part of four seasons spanning 1912–1927.
