= Bert Maxwell =

American baseball player (1886–1961)

- Pitcher
- Born: October 17, 1886; Texarkana, Arkansas, U.S.
- Died: December 10, 1961 (aged 75); Brady, Texas, U.S.
- Batted: Both Threw: Right

MLB debut
- September 12, 1906, for the Pittsburgh Pirates

Last MLB appearance
- September 14, 1914, for the Brooklyn Tip-Tops

MLB statistics
- Win–loss record: 4-7
- Earned run average: 4.16
- Strikeouts: 35
- Stats at Baseball Reference

Teams
- Pittsburgh Pirates (1906); Philadelphia Athletics (1908); New York Giants (1911); Brooklyn Tip-Tops (1914)

James Albert Maxwell (October 17, 1886 – December 10, 1961) was an American pitcher in Major League Baseball in the early 20th century. He was born in Texarkana, Arkansas, and died in Brady, Texas.
