= Leef Township, Madison County, Illinois =

Leef Township
- Township

- Location of Illinois in the United States
- Coordinates: 38°51′51″N 89°39′36″W
- Country: United States
- State: Illinois
- County: Madison
- Settled: November 2, 1875

Area
  - Total: 29.38 sq mi (76.1 km^{2})
  - Land: 29.26 sq mi (75.8 km^{2})
  - Water: 0.11 sq mi (0.28 km^{2})
- Elevation: 558 ft (170 m)

Population (2010)
  - Estimate (2016): 616
  - Density: 21.5/sq mi (8.3/km^{2})
- Time zone: UTC-6 (CST)
  - Summer (DST): UTC-5 (CDT)
- FIPS code: 17-119-42652

Leef Township is located in Madison County, Illinois, in the United States. As of the 2010 census, its population was 628 and it contained 246 housing units.

== History ==
Leef Township was named for the Swiss immigrant Jacob Leu, who anglicized his name to Leef.

== Geography ==
According to the 2010 census, the township has a total area of 29.38 square miles (76.1 km^{2}), of which 29.26 square miles (75.8 km^{2}) (or 99.59%) is land and 0.11 square miles (0.28 km^{2}) (or 0.37%) is water.

== Demographics ==
Historical population
Census	Pop.	Note	%±
2016 (est.)	616
U.S. Decennial Census
