= Harry Juul =

American baseball player (1893-1942)

- Pitcher
- Born: May 21, 1893; Chicago, Illinois
- Died: January 9, 1942 (aged 48); Proviso Township, Cook County, Illinois
- Batted: Right Threw: Right

MLB debut
- April 24, 1914, for the Brooklyn Tip-Tops

Last MLB appearance
- July 30, 1914, for the Brooklyn Tip-Tops

MLB statistics
- Games pitched: 9
- Innings pitched: 29
- Earned run average: 6.21

Teams
- Brooklyn Tip-Tops (1914)

Earl Harold Juul (May 21, 1893 – January 4, 1942) was a professional baseball player who was pitcher for the Brooklyn Tip-Tops of the Federal League in 1914. It was his only season at the Major League Baseball. He pitched in nine games, throwing 29 innings, with an ERA of 6.21.

He died in Proviso Township, Cook County, Illinois and was interred at Mount Olive Cemetery.
