= Jim Bluejacket =

American baseball player (1887–1947)

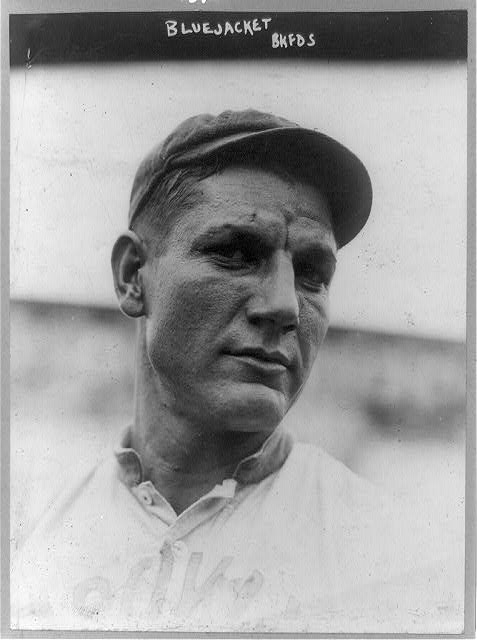
- Pitcher
- Born: July 8, 1887; Adair, Indian Territory, U.S.
- Died: March 26, 1947 (aged 59); Pekin, Illinois, U.S.
- Batted: Right Threw: Right

MLB debut
- August 6, 1914, for the Brooklyn Tip-Tops

Last MLB appearance
- July 16, 1916, for the Cincinnati Reds

MLB statistics
- Win–loss record: 14–17
- Earned run average: 3.46
- Strikeouts: 78
- Stats at Baseball Reference

Teams
- Brooklyn Tip-Tops (1914–1915); Cincinnati Reds (1916)

Jim Bluejacket (born William Lincoln Smith July 8, 1887 – March 26, 1947) was a major league pitcher in the early 20th century. Bluejacket played for the Brooklyn Tip-Tops (1914–1915) and Cincinnati Reds (1916).

== Personal life ==
When he started playing professional baseball in 1905 for the Sedalia Goldbugs in the American Association, he went by the name of Jim Bluejacket. After his playing days were over he continued to use his professional name as his legal name. In the 1900 U.S. Census records of Adair, Oklahoma his name was William L. Smith, son of William and Lucy (Dougherty) Smith. While playing for the Pekin Celestials of the Illinois–Missouri League in 1911 and 1912, he met Jennie Piro of Pekin, Illinois. They were married on December 31, 1912, in Carthage, Jasper County, Missouri and the wedding license reads that he was William L. Smith of Adair, Mayes County, Oklahoma. As late as June 5, 1917, he registered as William Lincoln Smith on his U.S. World War I draft registration card and stated that he was employed with the Bloomington ball team in Bloomington, Illinois.

== Playing career ==
Bluejacket played for the Bloomington Bloomers for parts of the 1912, 1913, 1914, and 1916 seasons. While pitching for Bloomington at the age of 27 in 1914 he got the attention of the major league scouts by winning twelve games in a row and was signed by the New York Giants. But before he was to report to the Giants the Brooklyn Tip-Tops of the Federal League offered to pay him more and he signed with them. This caused quite a stir in New York with threats of injunctions between the two teams. He played his first game for the Tip-Tops on August 6, 1914, and compiled a 4–4 record the rest of the season. The Tip-Tops played in Brooklyn's Washington Park, which had been the home of the National League's Brooklyn Dodgers until 1912 when they moved to Ebbets Field.

While playing for the Tip-Tops, Bluejacket became the first major league pitcher to win a game without throwing a pitch. He came into the game against the Pittsburgh Rebels in the top of the ninth with two outs and a runner on first. Without throwing a pitch, he picked off the runner at first base for the third out and was credited with the victory after his team scored the winning run in the bottom of the ninth.

A member of the Cherokee Nation, Bluejacket was one of the first Native Americans to play Major League Baseball.

== Legacy ==
Bluejacket's great-grandson is Bill Wilkinson, a relief pitcher for the Seattle Mariners in the 1980s. Bluejacket and Wilkinson were the first great-grandfather/great-grandson combination to play in the major leagues. Bluejacket's biological son is Fred Jüssi, a renowned Estonian biologist, nature writer and photographer.

Bluejacket made a substantial contribution to the baseball scene on the island of Aruba. He was employed there for 15 years and devoted countless hours to the youth of Aruba and was instrumental in the founding of the Lago Sports Park there.

The 1910 census shows that a 27-year-old man named Charley Mantle was living with Bluejacket's parents, William & Lucy Smith, as a hired hand on their farm in Adair Township, Mayes County, Oklahoma. Charley Mantle eventually became Mickey Mantle's paternal grandfather.
