= Grover Land =

American baseball player (1884–1958)

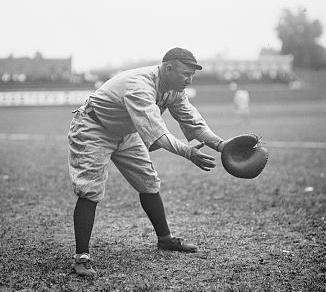
- Catcher
- Born: September 22, 1884; Frankfort, Kentucky, U.S.
- Died: July 22, 1958 (aged 73); Phoenix, Arizona, U.S.
- Batted: Right Threw: Right

MLB debut
- September 2, 1908, for the Cleveland Naps

Last MLB appearance
- September 25, 1915, for the Brooklyn Tip-Tops

MLB statistics
- Batting average: .243
- Home runs: 0
- Runs batted in: 80
- Stats at Baseball Reference

Teams
- Cleveland Naps (1908–1911, 1913); Brooklyn Tip-Tops (1914–1915)

Grover Cleveland Land (September 22, 1884 – July 22, 1958) was an American catcher in Major League Baseball. From 1908 through 1913 he played in 95 games for the Cleveland Naps almost exclusively as a backup catcher. In 1914 and 1915 he was the primary catcher for the Brooklyn Tip-Tops of the Federal League.

== Sources ==
- Career statistics from Baseball Reference · Baseball Reference (Minors) · Retrosheet · Baseball Almanac
