= Dick Wright (baseball) =

American baseball player (1890-1952)

- Catcher
- Born: May 5, 1890; Worcester, New York, U.S.
- Died: January 24, 1952 (aged 61); Bethlehem, Pennsylvania, U.S.
- Batted: Right Threw: Right

MLB debut
- June 30, 1915, for the Brooklyn Tip-Tops

Last MLB appearance
- July 9, 1915, for the Brooklyn Tip-Tops

MLB statistics
- Batting average: .000
- Games played: 4
- At bats: 5
- Stats at Baseball Reference

Teams
- Brooklyn Tip-Tops (1915)

Willard James "Dick" Wright (May 5, 1890 - January 24, 1952) was an American professional baseball player. He appeared in four games, three as a catcher, in Major League Baseball with the Federal League's Brooklyn Tip-Tops in 1915. He attended Lafayette College and Lehigh University.

== Sources ==
- Career statistics from Baseball Reference · Retrosheet · Baseball Almanac
