= Al Halt =

American baseball player (1890–1973)

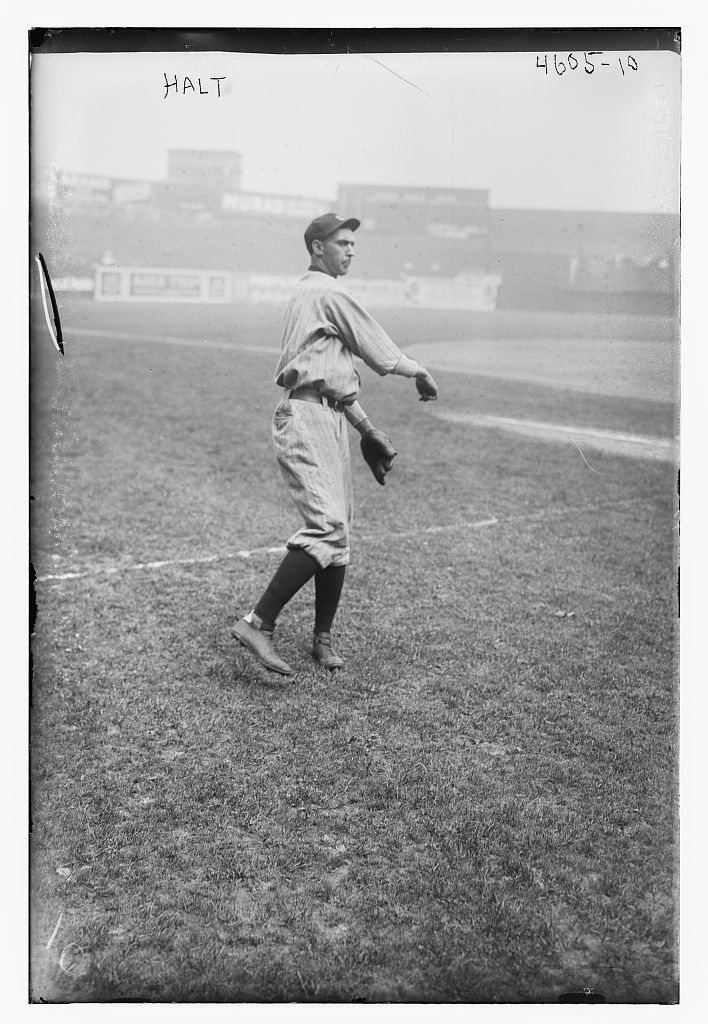
- Infielder
- Born: November 23, 1890; Sandusky, Ohio, U.S.
- Died: January 22, 1973 (aged 82); Sandusky, Ohio, U.S.
- Batted: Right Threw: Right

MLB debut
- May 29, 1914, for the Brooklyn Tip-Tops

Last MLB appearance
- August 30, 1918, for the Cleveland Indians

MLB statistics
- Batting average: .239
- Home runs: 6
- RBI: 90
- Stats at Baseball Reference

Teams
- Brooklyn Tip-Tops (1914–1915); Cleveland Indians (1918)

Al Halt (November 23, 1890 – January 22, 1973) was an American infielder for Major League Baseball in 1914, 1915, and 1918.

== Sources ==
- Career statistics from Baseball Reference · Baseball Reference (Minors) · Retrosheet · Baseball Almanac
