= Rinaldo Williams =

American baseball player (1893-1966)

- Third baseman
- Born: December 18, 1893; Santa Cruz, California, U.S.
- Died: April 24, 1966 (aged 72); Cottonwood, Arizona, U.S.
- Batted: Left Threw: Right

MLB debut
- October 8, 1914, for the Brooklyn Tip-Tops

Last MLB appearance
- October 10, 1914, for the Brooklyn Tip-Tops

MLB statistics
- Batting average: .267
- Home runs: 0
- RBI: 0
- Stats at Baseball Reference

Teams
- Brooklyn Tip-Tops (1914)

Rinaldo Louis Williams (December 18, 1893 in Santa Cruz, California – April 24, 1966 in Cottonwood, Arizona) was an American professional baseball player who played third base for four games in Major League Baseball in 1914, for the Brooklyn Tip-Tops of the Federal League.

== Sources ==
- Career statistics from Baseball Reference · Baseball Reference (Minors) · Retrosheet · Baseball Almanac
