= Don Marion (baseball) =

American baseball player (1889-1933)

- Pitcher
- Born: July 31, 1889; Bowling Green, Ohio, U.S.
- Died: January 18, 1933 (aged 43); Milwaukee, Wisconsin, U.S.
- Batted: Right Threw: Right

MLB debut
- April 23, 1914,, for the Brooklyn Tip-Tops

Last MLB appearance
- September 30, 1915,, for the Brooklyn Tip-Tops

MLB statistics
- Win–loss record: 15–11
- Earned run average: 3.42
- Strikeouts: 87
- Stats at Baseball Reference

Teams
- Brooklyn Tip-Tops (1914–1915)

Donald George Marion (July 31, 1889 – January 18, 1933) was an American pitcher in Major League Baseball in 1914 and 1915.

== Sources ==
- Career statistics from Baseball Reference · Baseball Reference (Minors) · Retrosheet · Baseball Almanac
