= George Anderson (baseball) =

American baseball player (1889–1962)

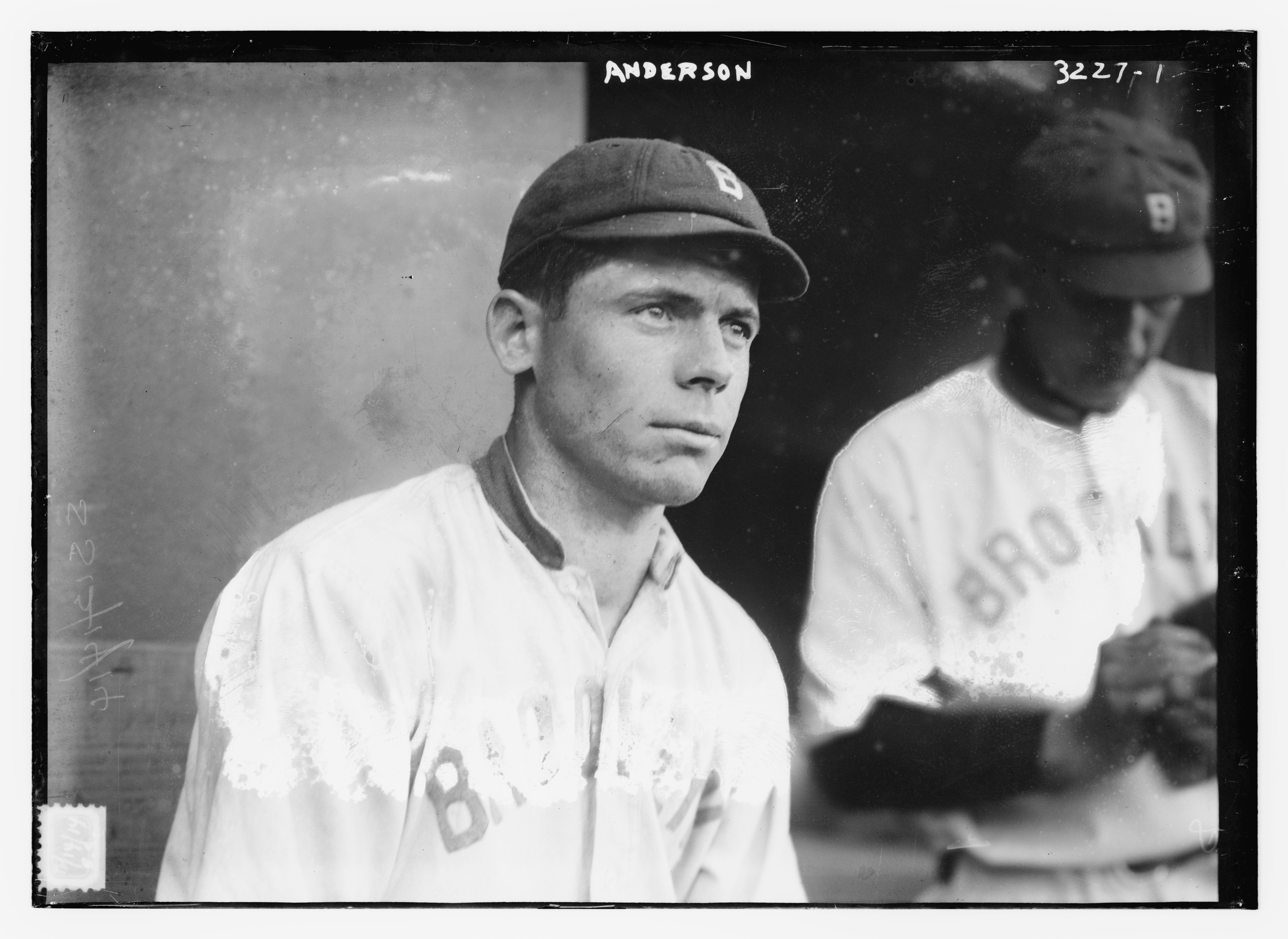
- Outfielder
- Born: September 26, 1889; Cleveland, Ohio, U.S.
- Died: May 28, 1962 (aged 72); Cleveland, Ohio, U.S.
- Batted: Left Threw: Right

MLB debut
- May 26, 1914, for the Brooklyn Tip-Tops

Last MLB appearance
- September 2, 1918, for the St. Louis Cardinals

MLB statistics
- Batting average: .287
- Home runs: 5
- RBI: 69
- Stats at Baseball Reference

Teams
- Brooklyn Tip-Tops (1914–1915); St. Louis Cardinals (1918)

George Jendrus "Andy" Anderson (September 26, 1889 – May 28, 1962) was an American Major League Baseball player from Cleveland, Ohio. He played as an outfielder for the Brooklyn Tip-Tops of the Federal League (1914 and 1915), and the St. Louis Cardinals (1918).

George died in Cleveland at the age of 72, and was buried in All Souls Cemetery located in Chardon, Ohio.
