= Hooks Wiltse =

American baseball player (1879-1959)

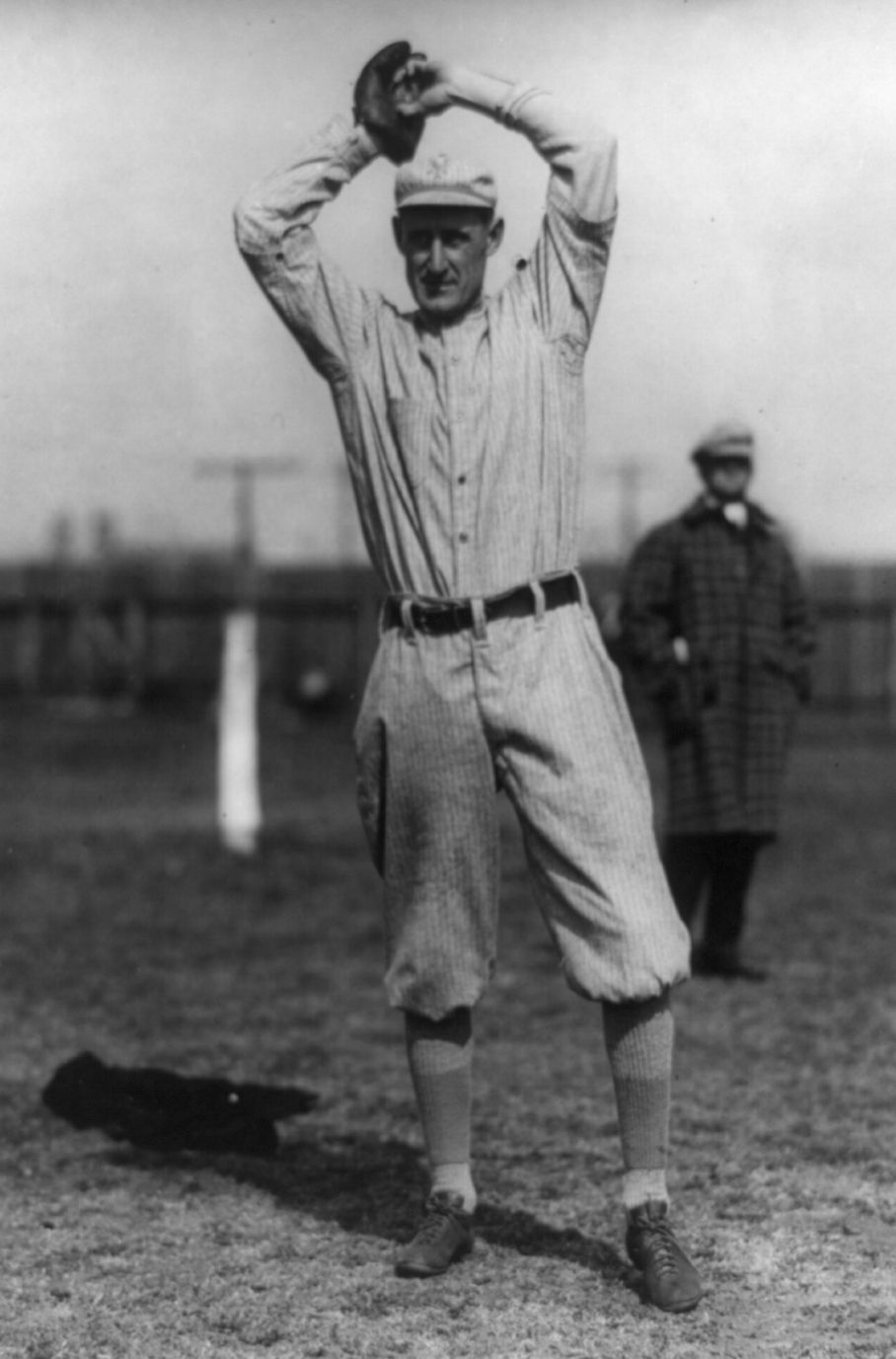
- Pitcher
- Born: September 7, 1879; Hamilton, New York, U.S.
- Died: January 21, 1959 (aged 79); Long Beach, New York, U.S.
- Batted: Right Threw: Left

MLB debut
- April 21, 1904, for the New York Giants

Last MLB appearance
- September 25, 1915, for the Brooklyn Tip-Tops

MLB statistics
- Win–loss record: 139–90
- Earned run average: 2.47
- Strikeouts: 965
- Stats at Baseball Reference

Teams
- New York Giants (1904–1914); Brooklyn Tip-Tops (1915)

Career highlights and awards
- Pitched a no-hitter on July 4, 1908

George Leroy "Hooks" Wiltse (September 7, 1879 – January 21, 1959) was an American professional baseball pitcher. He played 12 seasons in Major League Baseball (MLB) from 1904 to 1915. He was the younger brother of pitcher Snake Wiltse.

== Biography ==
"Hooks" earned his nickname because of the movement of his exceptional curveball and was one of the earliest pitchers to have a curveball regarded as being much more effective than his fastball.

From 1904 to 1914, he pitched for the National League's New York Giants. During that time, he combined with teammate Christy Mathewson for 435 wins, making them one of the best lefty-righty duos in history. Wiltse won five pennants with the Giants and pitched 3 1/3 innings in the 1911 World Series.

On July 4, 1908, Wiltse pitched a perfect game through 26 batters until he hit Philadelphia Phillies pitcher George McQuillan on a 2–2 count in a scoreless game. This was the only occurrence of a pitcher losing a perfect game with two outs in the ninth inning by hitting a batter until Washington Nationals pitcher Max Scherzer did so on June 20, 2015. Like Wiltse, Scherzer eventually completed a no-hitter, but unlike Wiltse, Scherzer had a 6–0 lead and was able to retire the next batter to end the game. Home plate umpire Cy Rigler later admitted he should have called the previous pitch strike three, which would have ended the inning. Wiltse pitched on, winning 1–0 in ten innings, with the hit-batsman the only lapse separating him from a perfect game. Wiltse's ten-inning complete game no-hitter still remains a Major League record.

"I missed being the only pitcher of all time to pitch a perfect ten inning game because Cy Rigler miscalled a strike. He admitted afterward he could have called it one. It was a tough break for the next pitch struck McQuillan on the shoulder and put him on first base. It had been a perfect game for eight and two-thirds innings."

As a pitcher, Wiltse was an above average hitter and fielder and was occasionally used as a position player to include playing first base in game two of the 1913 World Series where he cut down two runners at home plate in the ninth inning. He posted a career .210 batting average (156-for-743) scoring 81 runs with 2 home runs, 79 RBI and drawing 50 bases on balls.

In 1915, he jumped to the Brooklyn Tip-Tops of the Federal League, which is where he ended his major league career. He continued to play minor league baseball on and off until 1926. His last appearance came with the Reading Keystones, where he played in five games at the age of 46.

Following his retirement from baseball, Hooks returned to his hometown of Syracuse, New York, where he worked in real estate and became involved in local politics, serving as a local alderman and property assessor.

Wiltse died as a result of emphysema on January 21, 1959, at age 79.

== See also ==
- List of Major League Baseball no-hitters
- List of Major League Baseball single-inning strikeout leaders

== Sources ==
- Baseball:The Biographical Encyclopedia. Total Sports Illustrated. 2000. p. 343. ISBN 1-892129-34-5.

Preceded by Cy Young	No-hitter pitcher July 4, 1908	Succeeded by Nap Rucker
