= Felix Chouinard =

American baseball player (1887–1955)

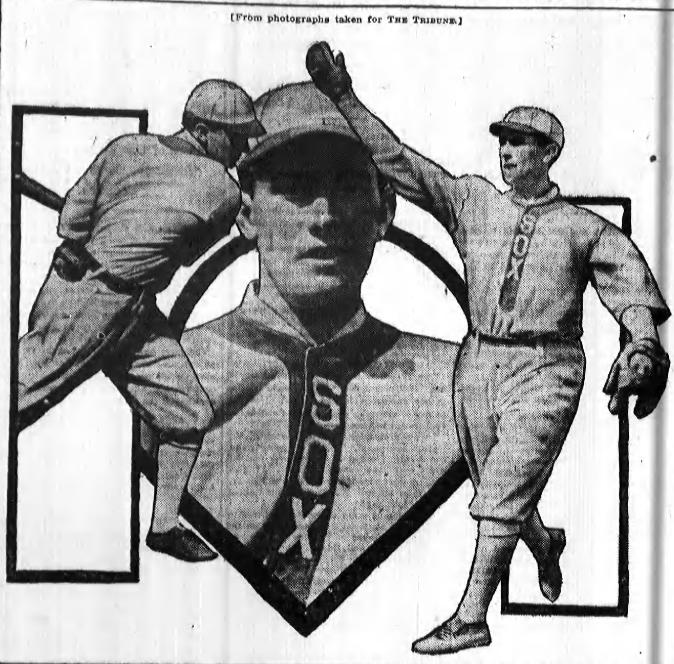
- Outfielder
- Born: October 5, 1887; Chicago, Illinois, U.S.
- Died: April 28, 1955 (aged 67); Hines, Illinois, U.S.
- Batted: Right Threw: Right

MLB debut
- September 11, 1910, for the Chicago White Sox

Last MLB appearance
- May 8, 1915, for the Brooklyn Tip-Tops

MLB statistics
- Batting average: .244
- Home runs: 1
- Runs batted in: 23
- Stats at Baseball Reference

Teams
- Chicago White Sox (1910–1911); Pittsburgh Rebels (1914); Brooklyn Tip-Tops (1914); Baltimore Terrapins (1914); Brooklyn Tip-Tops (1915)

Felix Chouinard (October 5, 1887 – April 28, 1955) was an American outfielder in Major League Baseball in 1910, 1911, 1914 and 1915. He played both seasons of the Federal League, during the first of which he played 3 separate stints with the Brooklyn Tip-Tops: he began the season with the Tip-Tops, then played for the Pittsburgh Rebels, returned to the Tip-Tops, played for the Baltimore Terrapins, then returned to the Tip-Tops yet again.

== Sources ==
- Career statistics from MLB · Baseball Reference · Baseball Reference (Minors) · Retrosheet · Baseball Almanac
