= Claude Cooper (baseball) =

American baseball player (1892–1974)

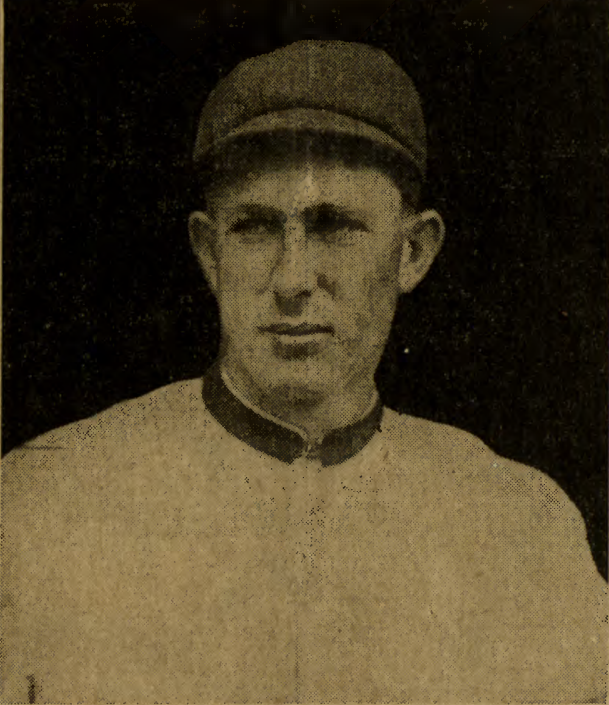
- Outfielder / First baseman
- Born: April 1, 1892; Troup, Texas, U.S.
- Died: January 1, 1974 (aged 81); Plainview, Texas, U.S.
- Batted: Left Threw: Left

MLB debut
- April 14, 1913, for the New York Giants

Last MLB appearance
- June 26, 1917, for the Philadelphia Phillies

MLB statistics
- Batting average: .260
- Fielding percentage: .955
- Putouts: 804
- Stats at Baseball Reference

Teams
- New York Giants (1913); Brooklyn Tip-Tops (1914–1915); Philadelphia Phillies (1916–1917)

Claude William Cooper (April 1, 1892 – January 21, 1974) was an American outfielder in Major League Baseball from 1913 to 1917.

In 373 games over five seasons, Cooper posted a .260 batting average (283-for-1089) scoring 156 runs, with 4 home runs and 104 RBI. He finished his career with a .955 fielding percentage playing at all three outfield positions and first base.

== Sources ==
- Career statistics from Baseball Reference · Baseball Reference (Minors) · Retrosheet · Baseball Almanac
