= Fin Wilson =

American baseball player (1888–1959)

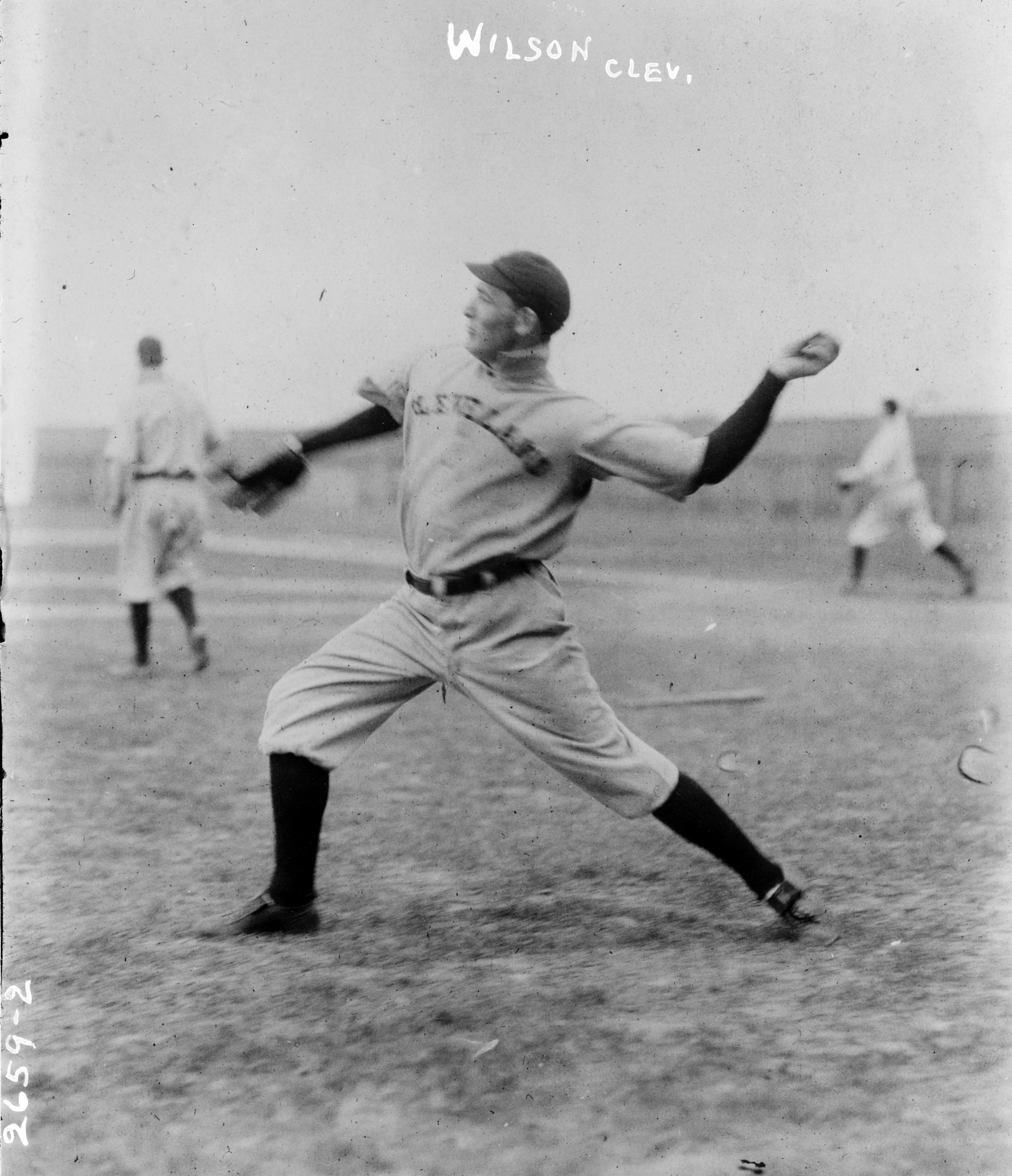
- Pitcher
- Born: December 9, 1888; East Fork, Kentucky, U.S.
- Died: March 9, 1959 (aged 70); Coral Gables, Florida, U.S.
- Batted: Left Threw: Left

MLB debut
- September 26, 1914, for the Brooklyn Tip-Tops

Last MLB appearance
- September 27, 1915, for the Brooklyn Tip-Tops

MLB statistics
- Win–loss record: 1–9
- Earned run average: 4.03
- Strikeouts: 51
- Stats at Baseball Reference

Teams
- Brooklyn Tip-Tops (1914–1915)
Member of the Kentucky House of Representatives from the 30th district
In office January 1, 1924 – January 1, 1926
Preceded by	Bryant Green
Succeeded by	A. M. Mercer

Finis Elbert Wilson (December 9, 1888 – March 9, 1959) was a professional baseball pitcher. He played part of 1914 and all of 1915 in Major League Baseball for the Brooklyn Tip-Tops of the Federal League.

Wilson was a banking executive, a Republican representative in the Kentucky legislature representing Green County and Hart County, a clerk for the United States District Court for the Western District of Tennessee, and a cotton plantation operator in Arkansas.
