= Ed Gagnier (baseball) =

American baseball player (1883-1946)

- Shortstop
- Born: April 16, 1883; Hamtramack, Michigan, U.S.
- Died: September 13, 1946 (aged 63); Detroit, Michigan, U.S.
- Batted: Right Threw: Right

MLB debut
- April 14, 1914, for the Brooklyn Tip-Tops

Last MLB appearance
- June 10, 1915, for the Buffalo Blues

MLB statistics
- Batting average: .195
- Home runs: 0
- Runs batted in: 29
- Stats at Baseball Reference

Teams
- Brooklyn Tip-Tops (1914–15); Buffalo Blues (1915)

Edward John Gagnier (April 16, 1883 – September 13, 1946) was an American infielder in Major League Baseball in 1914 and 1915. He played the majority of his 114 professional games at shortstop.

== Sources ==
- Career statistics from Baseball Reference · Baseball Reference (Minors) · Retrosheet · Baseball Almanac
