= Brooklyn Tip-Tops =

Information
- Location: Brooklyn, New York
- Founded: 1914
- Disbanded: 1915
- Nickname(s): Feds; BrookFeds
- League championships: 0
- Former league: Federal League
- Former ballpark: Washington Park III
- Ownership: Robert Ward
- Manager: Lee Magee; John Ganzel

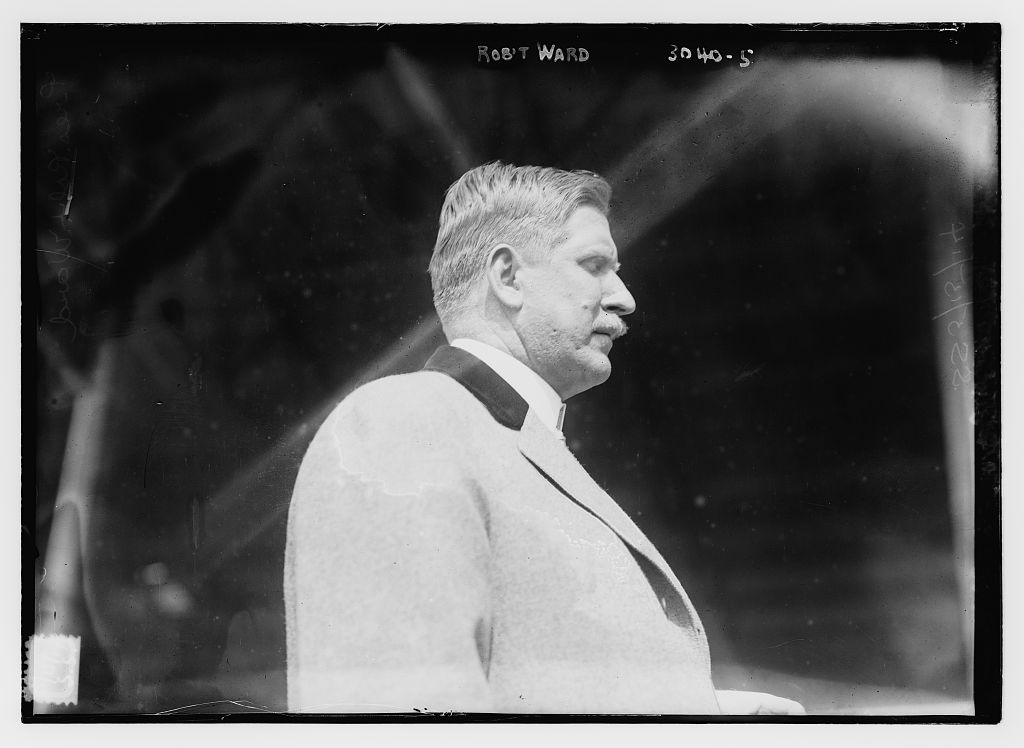
Robert Ward circa 1914

The Brooklyn Tip-Tops were a team in the short-lived Federal League of professional baseball from 1914 to 1915. The team's name came from Tip Top Bread, a product of Ward Baking Company, which was also owned by team owner Robert Ward. They were sometimes informally called the Brooklyn Feds or BrookFeds due to being the Brooklyn team of the Federal League. They played in Washington Park, which the Brooklyn Dodgers had abandoned after the 1912 season to move to Ebbets Field.

== History ==
The team finished a disappointing 4th in 1914. Federal League officials believed it was important to have a successful franchise in the New York City area and when the Indianapolis Hoosiers were transitioned to Newark, New Jersey, the "Federal League Ty Cobb", as 1914 FL batting champ Benny Kauff was known, was placed on the Brooklyn roster. In 1915, Kauff led the league with a .342 batting average and 55 stolen bases, but the Tip-Tops still finished in seventh place. The Newark and Brooklyn FL teams played three holiday doubleheaders during the 1915 season where one game was in Newark and the second was in Brooklyn.

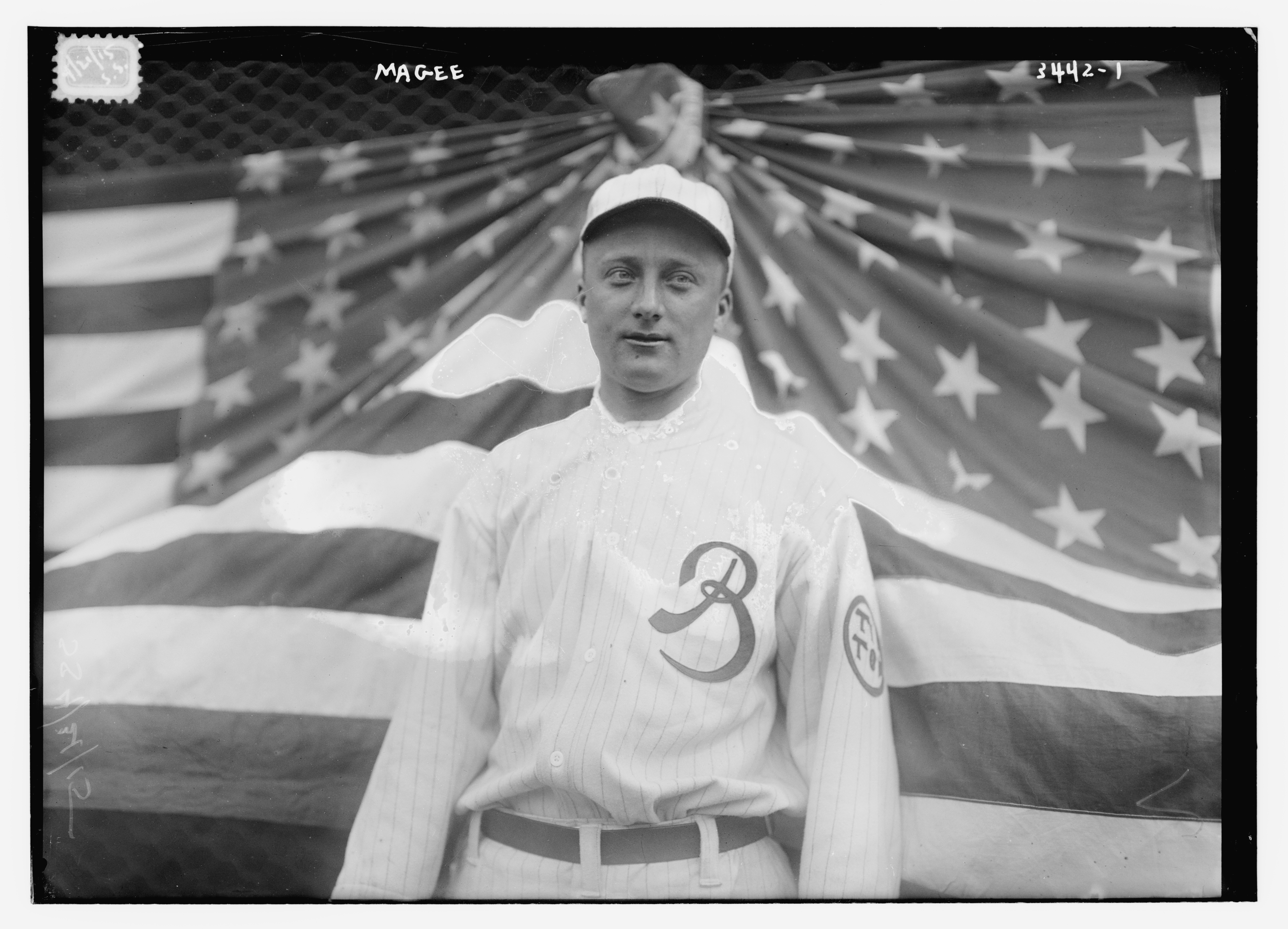
Lee Magee, Manager of the Brooklyn Tip-Tops

On September 19, 1914, Tip-Top Ed Lafitte threw the only no-hitter in Federal League history, beating the Kansas City Packers 6–2.

Had the Federal League (FL) lasted just one more season, night baseball might have been introduced two decades earlier. The Tip Tops had announced plans for the 1916 season to play some games at night.

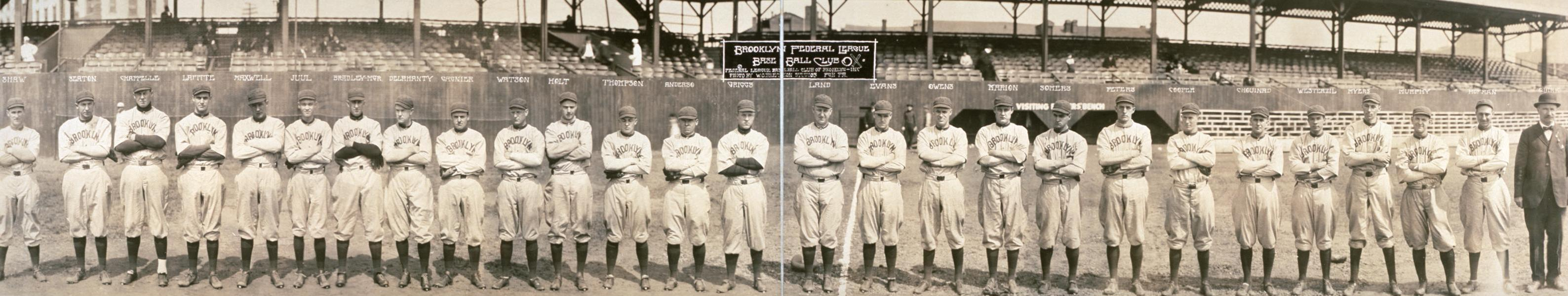
The 1914 Brooklyn Tip-Tops.

== See also ==
- Brooklyn Tip-Tops all-time roster
- 1914 Brooklyn Tip-Tops season
- 1915 Brooklyn Tip-Tops season
- George S. Ward
