= Buffalo Blues all-time roster =

List of baseball players

The Buffalo Blues were a professional baseball team based in Buffalo, New York, that played in the Federal League for two seasons in 1914 and 1915. The franchise used Federal League Park as their home field. In 1914, the team finished fourth in the FL with a record of 80-71. In 1915, the team finished sixth with a record of 74-78.

== Players ==
Key to symbols in player table
§	Player was a player-manager
†	Inducted into the National Baseball Hall of Fame and Museum

First baseman Hal Chase

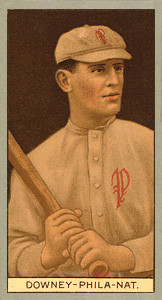
Second baseman Tom Downey

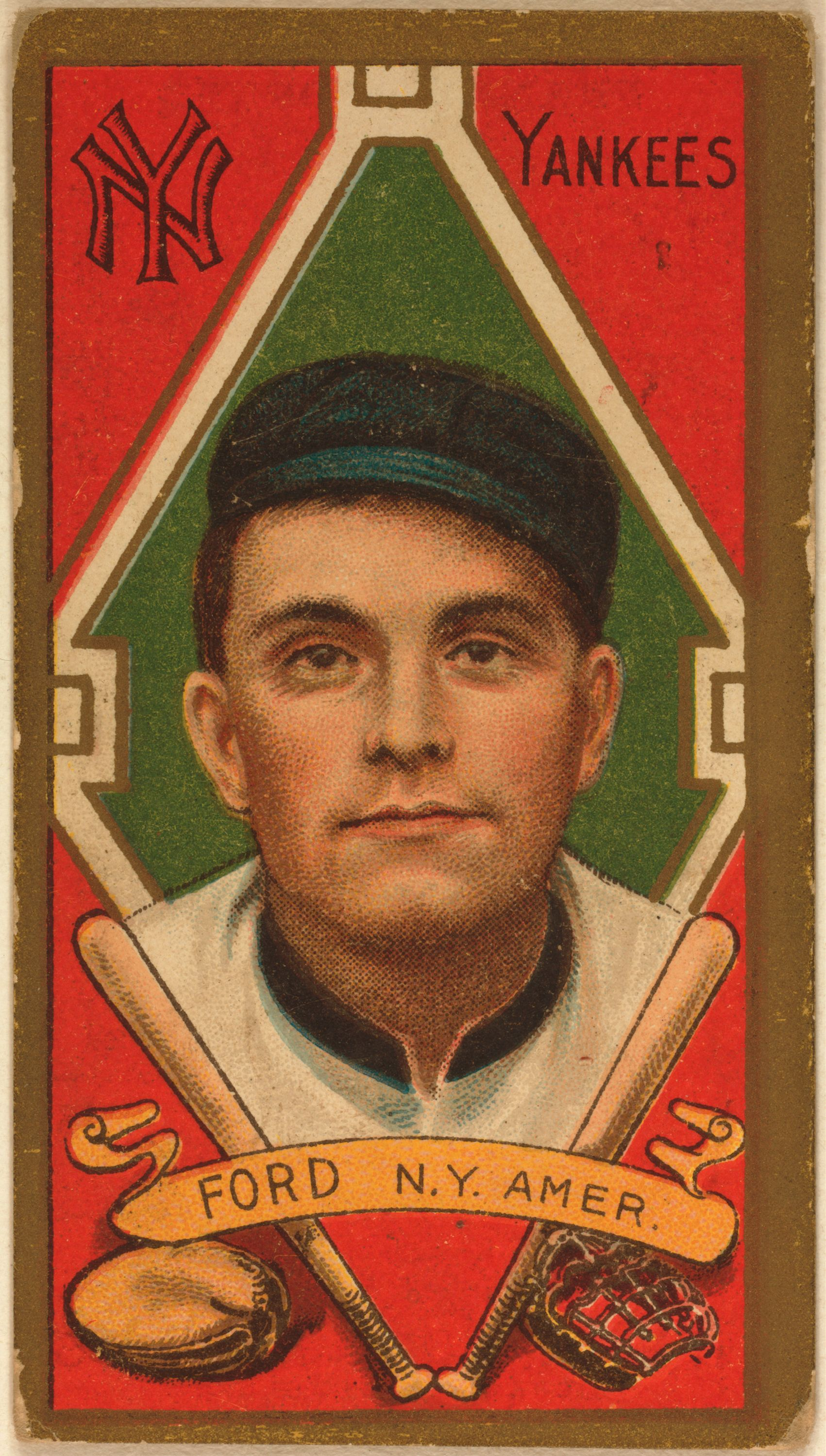
Pitcher Russ Ford

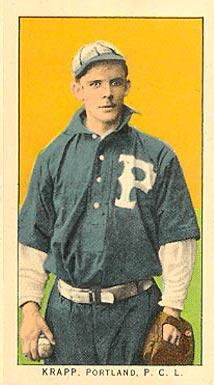
Pitcher Gene Krapp

Players who played for the Buffalo Blues, primary position played, and season(s) played for franchise
Player	Position(s)	Season(s)	Notes	Ref
Joe Agler	First baseman	1914–1915		
Nick Allen	Catcher	1914–1915		
Fred Anderson	Pitcher	1914–1915	In 1914, Anderson led Buffalo in innings pitched (260.1) and strikeouts (144).	
Hugh Bedient	Pitcher	1915		
Walter Blair^{§}	Catcher	1914–1915	Blair was Buffalo's manager for part of 1915.	
Luther Bonin	Right fielder	1914		
Everett Booe	Right fielder	1914		
Hal Chase	First baseman	1914–1915	Chase led the Federal League in home runs in 1915.	
Bill Collins	Right fielder	1914		
Jack Dalton	Center fielder	1915		
Frank Delahanty	Left fielder	1914		
Tom Downey	Second baseman	1914–1915		
Howard Ehmke	Pitcher	1915		
Clyde Engle	Center fielder / Third baseman	1914–1915		
Russ Ford	Pitcher	1914–1915	In 1914, Ford led Buffalo in wins (21) and earned run average (1.82).	
Ed Gagnier	Second baseman	1915		
Charlie Hanford	Center fielder	1914	In 1914, Hanford led Buffalo in home runs (12) and runs batted in (90).	
Solly Hofman	Left fielder / Center fielder	1915		
Joe Houser	Pitcher	1914		
Gene Krapp	Pitcher	1914–1915		
Ed Lafitte	Pitcher	1915		
Art LaVigne	Catcher	1914		
George LeClair	Pitcher	1915		
Harry Lord^{§}	Third baseman	1915	Lord was Buffalo's manager for part of 1915.	
Baldy Louden	Shortstop	1914–1915		
Rube Marshall	Pitcher	1915		
Tex McDonald	Right fielder	1914–1915		
Benny Meyer	Left fielder	1915		
Earl Moore	Pitcher	1914		
Harry Moran	Pitcher	1914		
Ned Pettigrew	Pinch hitter	1914		
Ed Porray	Pitcher	1914		
Roxey Roach	Shortstop	1915		
Larry Schlafly^{§}	Second baseman	1914	Schlafly was Buffalo's manager in 1914 and part of 1915.	
Biff Schlitzer	Pitcher	1914		
Al Schulz	Pitcher	1914–1915	In 1915, Schulz led Buffalo in innings pitched (309.2), wins (21), and strikeouts (160).	
Bob Smith	Pitcher	1914–1915		
Fred Smith	Third baseman	1914–1915		
Chubby Snyder	Catcher	1914		
Art Watson	Catcher	1915		
Dwight Wertz	Shortstop	1914		
Dan Woodman	Pitcher	1914–1915		
Del Young	Right fielder	1914–1915		
