= 1914 Buffalo Buffeds season =

1914 Buffalo Buffeds
- League: Federal League
- Ballpark: International Fair Association Grounds
- City: Buffalo, New York
- Record: 80–71 (.530)
- League place: 4th
- Owners: Walter Mullen, Laurens Enos, Oliver Cabana and William E. Robertson
- Managers: Larry Schlafly

The 1914 Buffalo Buffeds season was a season in American baseball. The Buffeds finished 80–71, good for 4th place in the Federal League, 7 games behind the Indianapolis Hoosiers.

== Regular season ==
=== Season standings ===
Federal League
Team	W	L	Pct.	GB	Home	Road
Indianapolis Hoosiers	88	65	.575	—	53‍–‍23	35‍–‍42
Chicago Federals	87	67	.565	1½	43‍–‍34	44‍–‍33
Baltimore Terrapins	84	70	.545	4½	53‍–‍26	31‍–‍44
Buffalo Buffeds	80	71	.530	7	47‍–‍29	33‍–‍42
Brooklyn Tip-Tops	77	77	.500	11½	47‍–‍32	30‍–‍45
Kansas City Packers	67	84	.444	20	37‍–‍36	30‍–‍48
Pittsburgh Rebels	64	86	.427	22½	37‍–‍37	27‍–‍49
St. Louis Terriers	62	89	.411	25	32‍–‍43	30‍–‍46

=== Record vs. opponents ===
1914 Federal League record Sources:
Team	BAL	BKF	BUF	CWH	IND	KC	PRB	SLT
Baltimore	—	9–13	14–8–1	12–10	10–12–1	12–10	10–12–2	17–5–1
Brooklyn	13–9	—	11–11–1	9–13	3–19	11–11–1	17–5–1	13–9
Buffalo	8–14–1	11–11–1	—	10–12–1	11–10	12–10–1	13–7	15–7
Chicago	10–12	13–9	12–10–1	—	13–9–1	14–8	12–10	13–9–1
Indianapolis	12–10–2	19–3	10–11	9–13–1	—	13–9–1	12–10	13–9
Kansas City	10–12	11–11	10–12–1	8–14	9–13–1	—	11–10	8–12
Pittsburgh	12–10–2	5–17	7–13–1	10–12	10–12	10–11	—	10–11–1
St. Louis	5–17–1	9–13	7–15	9–13–1	9–13	12–8	11–10	—

=== Roster ===
1914 Buffalo Buffeds
Roster
Pitchers: Fred Anderson; Russ Ford; Joe Houser; Gene Krapp; Earl Moore; Harry Moran; Ed Porray; Biff Schlitzer; Al Schulz; Bob Smith; Dan Woodman	Catchers: Nick Allen; Walter Blair; Art LaVigne; Chubby Snyder; Infielders: Joe Agler; Hal Chase; Tom Downey; Clyde Engle; Baldy Louden; Larry Schlafly; Fred Smith; Del Wertz	Outfielders: Luther Bonin; Everitt Booe; Bill Collins; Frank Delahanty; Charlie Hanford; Tex McDonald; Del Young; Other batters: Ned Pettigrew	Manager: Larry Schlafly

== Player stats ==
=== Batting ===
==== Starters by position ====
Note: Pos = Position; G = Games played; AB = At bats; H = Hits; Avg. = Batting average; HR = Home runs; RBI = Runs batted in

Pos	Player	G	AB	H	Avg.	HR	RBI
C	Walter Blair	128	378	92	.243	0	33
1B	Joe Agler	135	463	126	.272	0	20
2B	Tom Downey	151	541	118	.218	2	42
SS	Baldy Louden	126	431	135	.313	6	63
3B	Fred Smith	145	473	104	.220	2	45
OF	Frank Delahanty	79	274	55	.201	2	27
OF	Charlie Hanford	155	597	174	.291	12	90
OF	Tex McDonald	69	250	74	.296	3	32

==== Other batters ====
Note: G = Games played; AB = At bats; H = Hits; Avg. = Batting average; HR = Home runs; RBI = Runs batted in

Player	G	AB	H	Avg.	HR	RBI
Hal Chase	75	291	101	.347	3	48
Everitt Booe	76	241	54	.224	0	14
Del Young	80	174	48	.276	4	22
Larry Schlafly	50	127	33	.260	2	19
Clyde Engle	32	110	28	.255	0	12
Art LaVigne	51	90	14	.156	0	4
Luther Bonin	20	76	14	.184	0	4
Nick Allen	32	63	15	.238	0	4
Bill Collins	21	47	7	.149	0	2
Ned Pettigrew	2	2	0	.000	0	0
Del Wertz	3	0	0	----	0	0
Chubby Snyder	1	0	0	----	0	0

=== Pitching ===
==== Starting pitchers ====
Note: G = Games pitched; IP = Innings pitched; W = Wins; L = Losses; ERA = Earned run average; SO = Strikeouts

Player	G	IP	W	L	ERA	SO
Fred Anderson	37	260.1	13	15	3.08	144
Gene Krapp	36	252.2	16	14	2.49	106
Russ Ford	35	247.1	21	6	1.82	123
Earl Moore	36	194.2	11	15	4.30	96
Al Schulz	27	171.0	9	12	3.37	87
Ed Porray	3	10.1	0	1	4.35	0

==== Other pitchers ====
Note: G = Games pitched; IP = Innings pitched; W = Wins; L = Losses; ERA = Earned run average; SO = Strikeouts

Player	G	IP	W	L	ERA	SO
Harry Moran	34	154.0	10	7	4.27	73
Joe Houser	7	23.0	0	1	5.48	6

==== Relief pitchers ====
Note: G = Games pitched; W = Wins; L = Losses; SV = Saves; ERA = Earned run average; SO = Strikeouts

Player	G	W	L	SV	ERA	SO
Bob Smith	15	0	0	3	3.44	13
Dan Woodman	13	0	0	1	2.41	13
Biff Schlitzer	3	0	0	0	16.20	1
