= 1915 Buffalo Blues season =

1915 Buffalo Blues
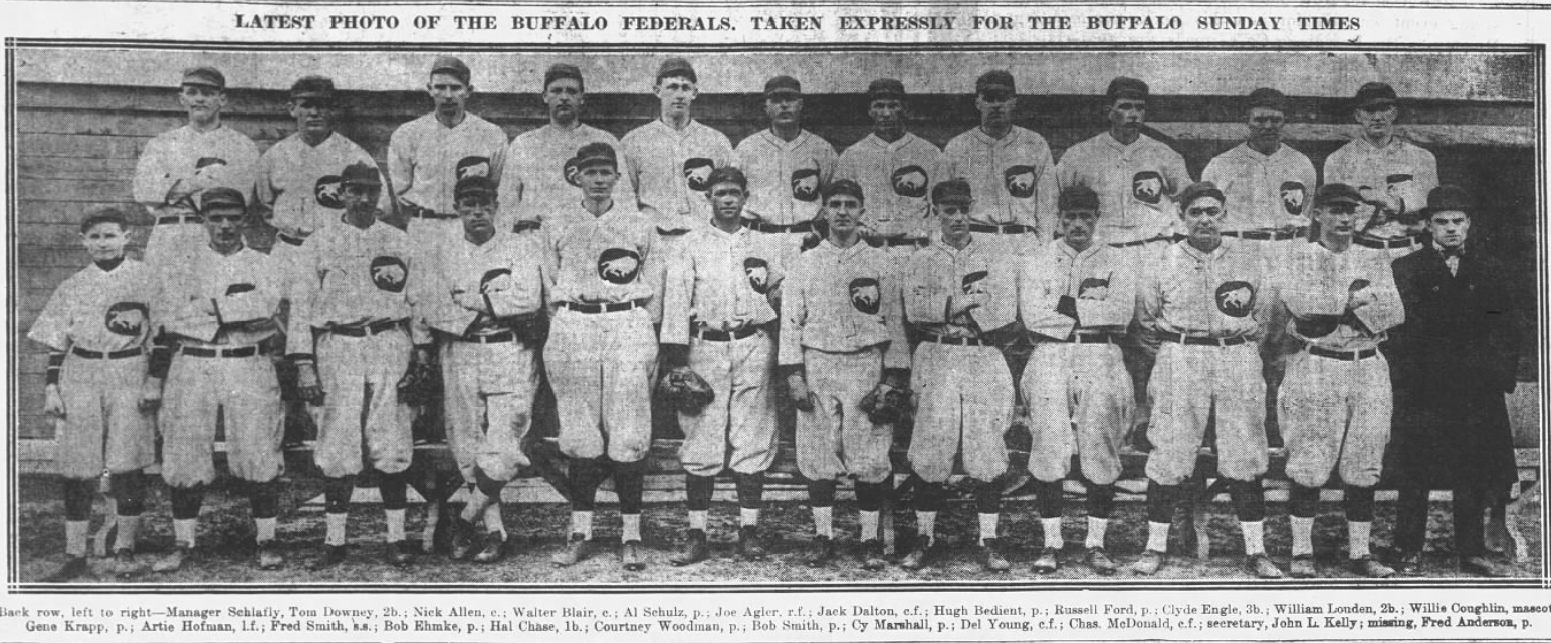
- 1915 Buffalo Blues team photo
- League: Federal League
- Ballpark: International Fair Association Grounds
- City: Buffalo, New York
- Record: 74–78 (.487)
- League place: 6th
- Owners: Walter Mullen, Laurens Enos, Oliver Cabana and William E. Robertson
- Managers: Larry Schlafly, Walter Blair and Harry Lord

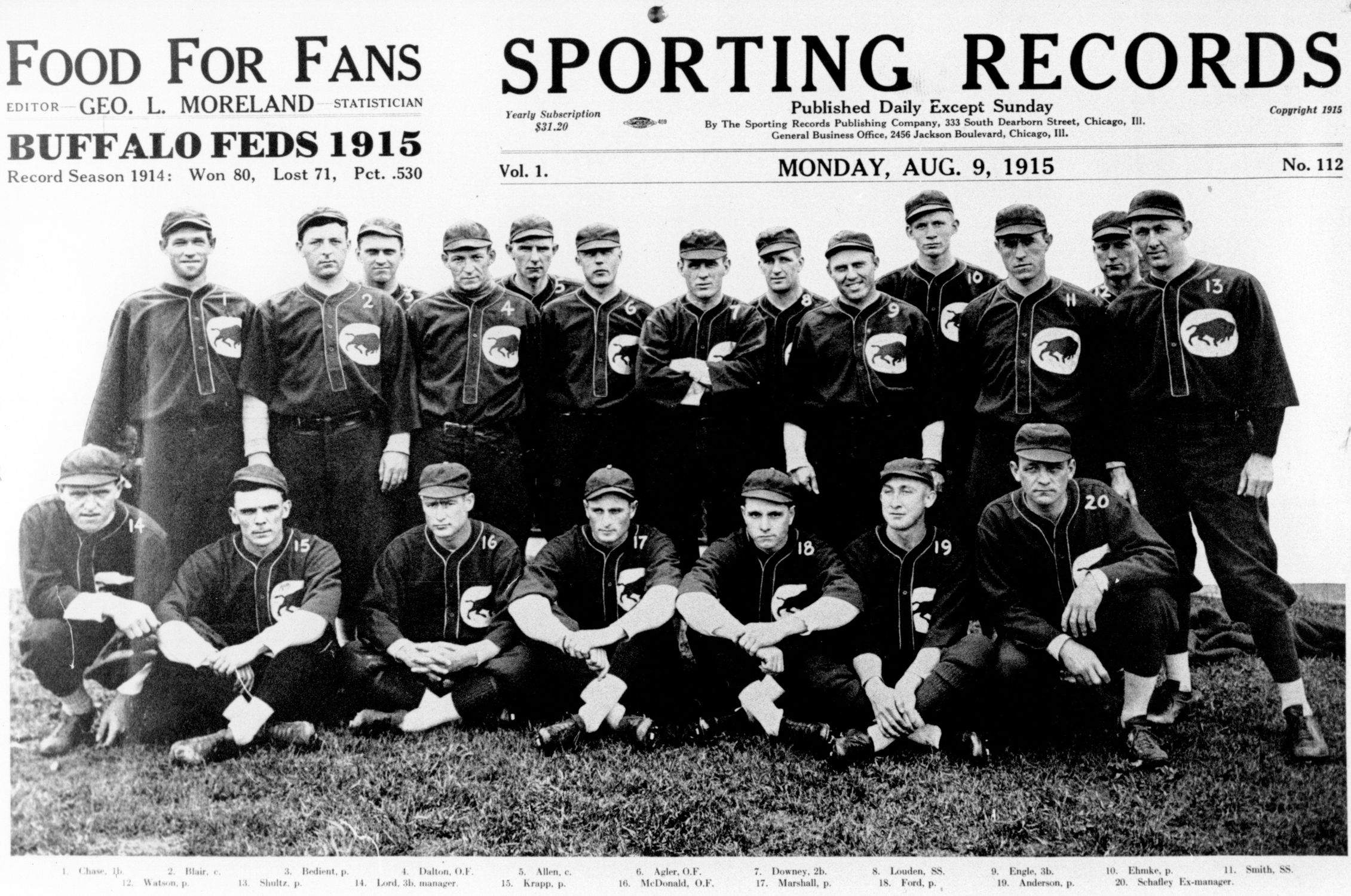
Team portrait from August 1915

The 1915 Buffalo Blues season was a season in American baseball. The team, which did not have an official nickname but was generally known as the Buffeds the previous year, adopted the "Blues" nickname for the 1915 season. They were also known as the Buffalo Federals or Buffalo Feds. They finished 74–78, good for 6th place in the Federal League, 12 games behind the Chicago Whales. After the season, both the team and the league folded. It would be 105 more years—when the Toronto Blue Jays temporarily moved to Buffalo to play the pandemic-shortened 2020 season and avoid border restrictions—before Buffalo hosted Major League Baseball again.

== Regular season ==
=== Season standings ===
Federal League
Team	W	L	Pct.	GB	Home	Road
Chicago Whales	86	66	.566	—	44‍–‍32	42‍–‍34
St. Louis Terriers	87	67	.565	—	43‍–‍34	44‍–‍33
Pittsburgh Rebels	86	67	.562	½	45‍–‍31	41‍–‍36
Kansas City Packers	81	72	.529	5½	46‍–‍31	35‍–‍41
Newark Peppers	80	72	.526	6	40‍–‍39	40‍–‍33
Buffalo Blues	74	78	.487	12	37‍–‍40	37‍–‍38
Brooklyn Tip-Tops	70	82	.461	16	34‍–‍40	36‍–‍42
Baltimore Terrapins	47	107	.305	40	24‍–‍51	23‍–‍56

=== Record vs. opponents ===
1915 Federal League record Sources:
Team	BAL	BKF	BUF	CWH	KC	NWK	PRB	SLT
Baltimore	—	7–15	8–14	9–13	4–18	6–16	5–17	8–14
Brooklyn	15–7	—	9–11	7–15	11–11	12–10	9–13	7–15–1
Buffalo	14–8	11–9	—	8–14	11–11	11–11	9–13	10–12–1
Chicago	13–9	15–7	14–8	—	11–11	10–10–1	12–10–1	11–11–1
Kansas City	18–4	11–11	11–11	11–11	—	11–11	8–13	11–11
Newark	16–6	10–12	11–11	10–10–1	11–11	—	12–10–1	10–12–1
Pittsburgh	17–5	13–9	13–9	10–12–1	13–8	10–12–1	—	10–12–1
St. Louis	14–8	15–7–1	12–10–1	11–11–1	11–11	12–10–1	12–10–1	—

=== Roster ===
1915 Buffalo Blues
Roster
Pitchers: Fred Anderson; Hugh Bedient; Howard Ehmke; Russ Ford; Gene Krapp; Ed Lafitte; George LeClair; Rube Marshall; Al Schulz; Bob Smith; Dan Woodman	Catchers: Nick Allen; Walter Blair; Art Watson; Infielders: Hal Chase; Tom Downey; Ed Gagnier; Harry Lord; Baldy Louden; Roxey Roach; Fred Smith	Outfielders: Joe Agler; Jack Dalton; Clyde Engle; Solly Hofman; Tex McDonald; Benny Meyer; Del Young	Manager: Walter Blair; Harry Lord; Larry Schlafly

== Player stats ==
=== Batting ===
==== Starters by position ====
Note: Pos = Position; G = Games played; AB = At bats; H = Hits; Avg. = Batting average; HR = Home runs; RBI = Runs batted in

Pos	Player	G	AB	H	Avg.	HR	RBI
C	Walter Blair	98	290	65	.224	2	20
1B	Hal Chase	145	567	165	.291	17	89
2B	Baldy Louden	141	469	132	.281	4	48
SS	Roxey Roach	92	346	93	.269	2	31
3B	Harry Lord	97	359	97	.270	1	21
OF	Jack Dalton	132	437	138	.293	2	46
OF	Clyde Engle	141	501	131	.261	3	71
OF	Benny Meyer	93	333	77	.231	1	29

==== Other batters ====
Note: G = Games played; AB = At bats; H = Hits; Avg. = Batting average; HR = Home runs; RBI = Runs batted in

Player	G	AB	H	Avg.	HR	RBI
Solly Hofman	109	346	81	.234	0	27
Tom Downey	92	282	56	.199	1	19
Tex McDonald	87	251	68	.271	6	39
Nick Allen	84	215	44	.205	0	17
Fred Smith	35	114	27	.237	0	11
Joe Agler	25	73	13	.178	0	2
Art Watson	22	30	14	.467	1	13
Del Young	12	15	2	.133	0	0
Ed Gagnier	1	2	0	.000	0	0

=== Pitching ===
==== Starting pitchers ====
Note: G = Games pitched; IP = Innings pitched; W = Wins; L = Losses; ERA = Earned run average; SO = Strikeouts

Player	G	IP	W	L	ERA	SO
Al Schulz	42	309.2	21	14	3.08	160
Fred Anderson	36	240.0	19	13	2.51	142
Gene Krapp	38	231.0	9	19	3.51	93
Russ Ford	21	127.1	5	9	4.52	34

==== Other pitchers ====
Note: G = Games pitched; IP = Innings pitched; W = Wins; L = Losses; ERA = Earned run average; SO = Strikeouts

Player	G	IP	W	L	ERA	SO
Hugh Bedient	53	269.1	16	18	3.17	106
Rube Marshall	21	59.1	2	1	3.94	21
Ed Lafitte	14	50.1	2	2	3.40	17
Dan Woodman	5	15.1	0	0	4.11	1

==== Relief pitchers ====
Note: G = Games pitched; W = Wins; L = Losses; SV = Saves; ERA = Earned run average; SO = Strikeouts

Player	G	W	L	SV	ERA	SO
Howard Ehmke	18	0	2	0	5.53	18
George LeClair	1	0	0	0	6.00	2
Bob Smith	1	0	0	0	18.00	0
