= Landrus =

Landrus may refer to:

- Brian Landrus (born 1978), American jazz saxophonist, multi-instrumentalist, composer, producer and educator
- Landrus, Pennsylvania, United States, a ghost town

== See also ==
- Landres, a French commune
- Landru (disambiguation)
