= Del Young =

Del Young may refer to:

- Del Young (outfielder) (1885-1959), Major League Baseball outfielder from 1909 to 1915
- Del Young (infielder) (1912-1979), Major League Baseball from 1937 to 1940
