= William E. Robertson =

American baseball executive

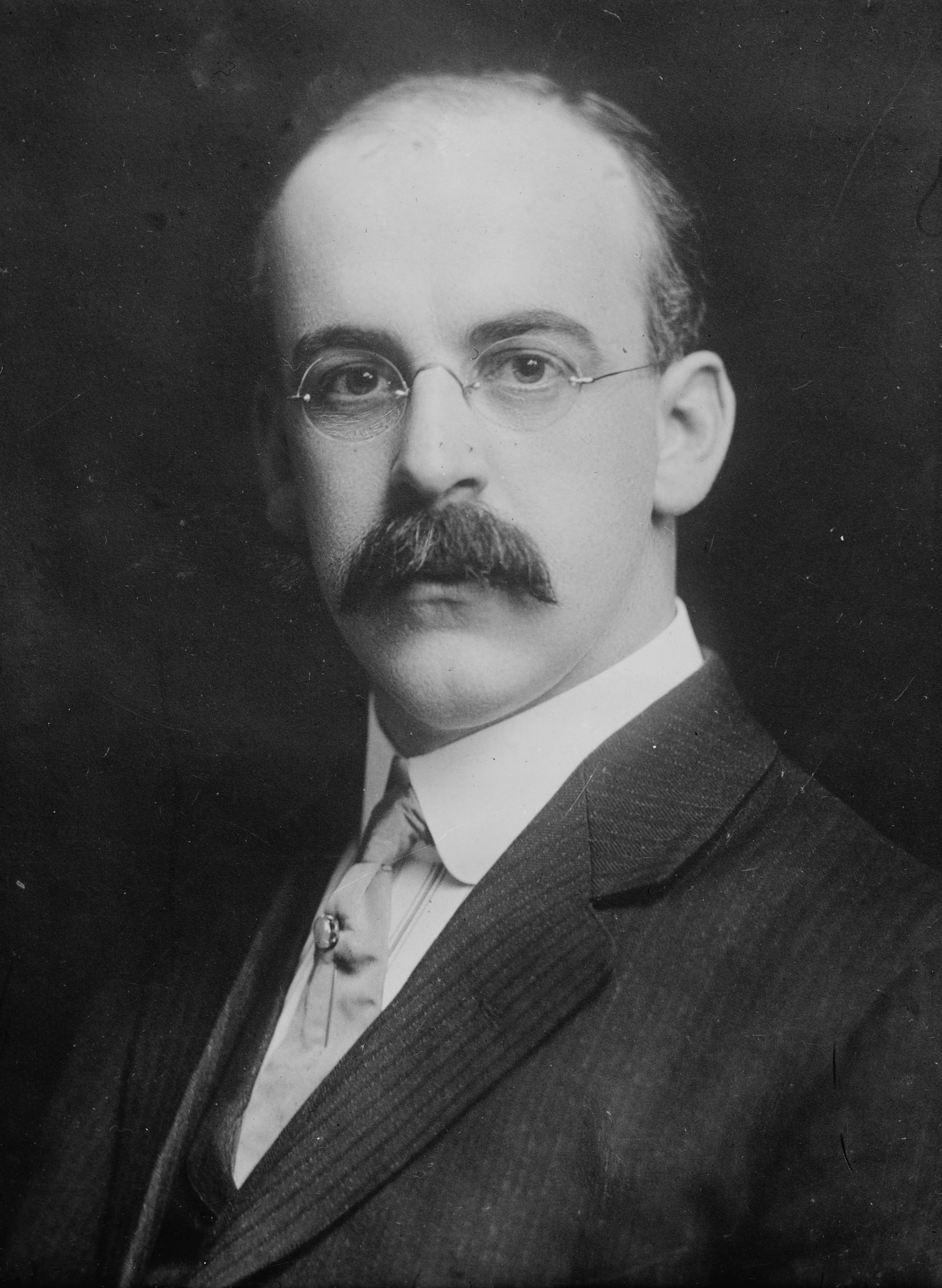
William E. Robertson

William E. Robertson was an American baseball executive who served as the president of the Buffalo Blues of the Federal League in 1914 and 1915. He also managed concessions at Griffith Stadium.
