= Charlie Hanford =

American baseball player (1882-1963)

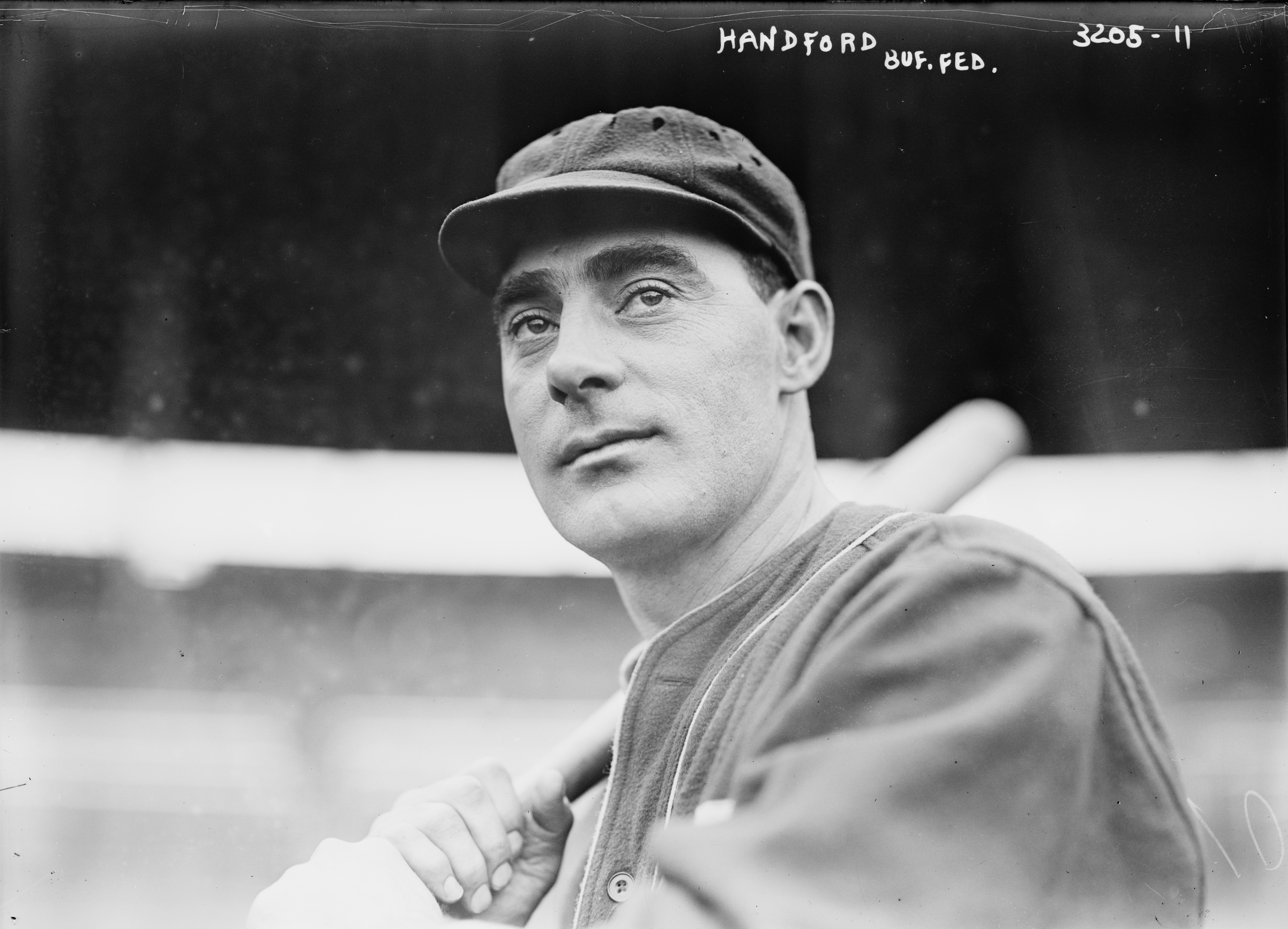
- Hanford with the Buffalo Buffeds in 1914
- Outfielder
- Born: June 3, 1882; Tunstall, England
- Died: July 19, 1963 (aged 81); Trenton, New Jersey, U.S.
- Batted: Right Threw: Right

Major league debut
- April 13, 1914, for the Buffalo Buffeds

Last major league appearance
- September 30, 1915, for the Chicago Whales

Major league statistics
- Batting average: .280
- Home runs: 12
- Runs batted in: 112
- Stats at Baseball Reference

Teams
- Buffalo Buffeds (1914); Chicago Whales (1915)

Charles Joseph Hanford (June 3, 1882 – July 19, 1963) was a center fielder in professional baseball. After a long career in minor league ball, that had begun in 1895, Hanford finally appeared in major league games for the Buffalo Buffeds and Chicago Whales of the Federal League in 1914 and 1915.
