= 1915 Major League Baseball season =

1915 MLB season
- League: American League (AL); National League (NL); Federal League (FL)
- Sport: Baseball
- Duration: Regular season: April 14 – October 7, 1915 (AL, NL); April 10 – October 3, 1915 (FL); World Series (AL vs. NL): October 8–13, 1915
- Games: 154
- Teams: 24 (8 per league)

Pennant winners
- AL champions: Boston Red Sox
- AL runners-up: Detroit Tigers
- NL champions: Philadelphia Phillies
- NL runners-up: Boston Braves
- FL champions: Chicago Whales
- FL runners-up: St. Louis Terriers

World Series
- Champions: Boston Red Sox (AL)
- Runners-up: Philadelphia Phillies (NL)

MLB seasons
- ← 1914 1916 →

Locations of teams for the 1915–1922 American League seasons
American League
Locations of teams for the 1915 National League season
National League
Locations of teams for the 1915 Federal League season
Federal League

The 1915 major league baseball season began on April 10, 1915. The Federal League regular season ended on October 3, and saw the Chicago Whales winning the Federal League pennant. The regular season for the National League and American League ended on October 7, with the Philadelphia Phillies and Boston Red Sox as the regular season champions of the National League and American League, respectively. The postseason began with Game 1 of the 12th World Series on October 8 and ended with Game 5 on October 13. The Red Sox defeated the Phillies, four games to one, capturing their third championship in franchise history, since their previous in 1912. Going into the season, the defending World Series champions were the Boston Braves from the 1914 season. The World Series had again featured the cities of Boston and Philadelphia, though this time with their opposite-league counterparts.

The Indianapolis Hoosiers relocated to Newark, New Jersey as the Newark Peppers. The Buffalo Buffeds, Chicago Federals, and Cleveland Naps renamed as the Buffalo Blues, Chicago Whales, and Cleveland Indians, respectively.

The Federal League brought an antitrust lawsuit against the National and American Leagues prior to the 1915 season. The parties eventually reached a settlement and the Federal League disbanded after the season.

The major-league status of the Federal League was confirmed by the Special Baseball Records Committee (as convened by then-Commissioner of Baseball William Eckert) in 1969.

== Schedule ==
The 1915 schedule consisted of 154 games for all teams in the American League, National League, and Federal League, each of which had eight teams. Each team was scheduled to play 22 games against the other seven teams of their respective league. This continued the format put in place for the 1904 season, and which lasted until the 140-game schedule of 1919. Most teams played more than 154 games, due to tie games (called on account of darkness or weather) that had to be replayed; tie games are excluded from team standings, but the statistics of individual players are included in their season totals.

The Federal League had its Opening Day on April 10, featuring all eight teams. Opening Day for the American and National Leagues was on April 14, featuring the 16 teams of those two leagues, as had been scheduled the season prior. The Federal League had the final day of its regular season on October 3. The final day of the regular season for the National and American Leagues was October 7. The World Series took place between October 8 and October 13.

== Rule change ==
The National League established that player-managers would count against the player limit, so the bench manager would be unable to insert himself in any game during the season without forfeiting the right to carry one of the players on his roster. The penalty for violating the rule was forfeiture of the game.

== Teams ==
An asterisk (*) denotes the ballpark a team played the minority of their home games at

League	Team	City	Ballpark	Capacity	Manager
American League	Boston Red Sox	Boston, Massachusetts	Fenway Park	27,000	Bill Carrigan
American League	Boston Red Sox	Boston, Massachusetts	Braves Field*	40,000*	Bill Carrigan
American League	Chicago White Sox	Chicago, Illinois	Comiskey Park	28,000	Pants Rowland
American League	Cleveland Indians	Cleveland, Ohio	League Park	21,414	Joe Birmingham
American League	Cleveland Indians	Cleveland, Ohio	League Park	21,414	Lee Fohl
American League	Detroit Tigers	Detroit, Michigan	Navin Field	23,000	Hughie Jennings
American League	New York Yankees	New York, New York	Brush Stadium	34,000	Bill Donovan
American League	Philadelphia Athletics	Philadelphia, Pennsylvania	Shibe Park	23,000	Connie Mack
American League	St. Louis Browns	St. Louis, Missouri	Sportsman's Park	18,000	Branch Rickey
American League	Washington Senators	Washington, D.C.	National Park	27,000	Clark Griffith
National League	Boston Braves	Boston, Massachusetts	Fenway Park	27,000	George Stallings
National League	Boston Braves	Boston, Massachusetts	Braves Field*	40,000*	George Stallings
National League	Brooklyn Robins	New York, New York	Ebbets Field	30,000	Wilbert Robinson
National League	Chicago Cubs	Chicago, Illinois	West Side Park	16,000	Roger Bresnahan
National League	Cincinnati Reds	Cincinnati, Ohio	Redland Field	20,696	Buck Herzog
National League	New York Giants	New York, New York	Brush Stadium	34,000	John McGraw
National League	Philadelphia Phillies	Philadelphia, Pennsylvania	National League Park	18,000	Pat Moran
National League	Pittsburgh Pirates	Pittsburgh, Pennsylvania	Forbes Field	25,000	Fred Clarke
National League	St. Louis Cardinals	St. Louis, Missouri	Robison Field	21,000	Miller Huggins
Federal League	Baltimore Terrapins	Baltimore, Maryland	Terrapin Park	16,000	Otto Knabe
Federal League	Brooklyn Tip-Tops	New York, New York	Washington Park	18,800	Lee Magee
Federal League	Brooklyn Tip-Tops	New York, New York	Washington Park	18,800	John Ganzel
Federal League	Buffalo Blues	Buffalo, New York	Federal League Park	20,000	Larry Schlafly
Federal League	Buffalo Blues	Buffalo, New York	Federal League Park	20,000	Walter Blair
Federal League	Buffalo Blues	Buffalo, New York	Federal League Park	20,000	Harry Lord
Federal League	Chicago Whales	Chicago, Illinois	Weeghman Park	15,000	Joe Tinker
Federal League	Kansas City Packers	Kansas City, Missouri	Gordon and Koppel Field	12,000	George Stovall
Federal League	Newark Peppers	Newark, New Jersey	Harrison Park	21,000	Bill Phillips
Federal League	Newark Peppers	Newark, New Jersey	Harrison Park	21,000	Bill McKechnie
Federal League	Pittsburgh Rebels	Pittsburgh, Pennsylvania	Exposition Park	16,000	Rebel Oakes
Federal League	St. Louis Terriers	St. Louis, Missouri	Handlan's Park	15,000	Fielder Jones

== Standings ==
=== American League ===
American League
Team	W	L	Pct.	GB	Home	Road
Boston Red Sox	101	50	.669	—	55‍–‍20	46‍–‍30
Detroit Tigers	100	54	.649	2½	51‍–‍26	49‍–‍28
Chicago White Sox	93	61	.604	9½	54‍–‍24	39‍–‍37
Washington Senators	85	68	.556	17	50‍–‍29	35‍–‍39
New York Yankees	69	83	.454	32½	37‍–‍43	32‍–‍40
St. Louis Browns	63	91	.409	39½	35‍–‍38	28‍–‍53
Cleveland Indians	57	95	.375	44½	27‍–‍50	30‍–‍45
Philadelphia Athletics	43	109	.283	58½	19‍–‍53	24‍–‍56

=== National League ===
National League
Team	W	L	Pct.	GB	Home	Road
Philadelphia Phillies	90	62	.592	—	49‍–‍27	41‍–‍35
Boston Braves	83	69	.546	7	49‍–‍27	34‍–‍42
Brooklyn Robins	80	72	.526	10	51‍–‍26	29‍–‍46
Chicago Cubs	73	80	.477	17½	42‍–‍34	31‍–‍46
Pittsburgh Pirates	73	81	.474	18	40‍–‍37	33‍–‍44
St. Louis Cardinals	72	81	.471	18½	42‍–‍36	30‍–‍45
Cincinnati Reds	71	83	.461	20	39‍–‍37	32‍–‍46
New York Giants	69	83	.454	21	37‍–‍38	32‍–‍45

=== Federal League ===
Federal League
Team	W	L	Pct.	GB	Home	Road
Chicago Whales	86	66	.566	—	44‍–‍32	42‍–‍34
St. Louis Terriers	87	67	.565	—	43‍–‍34	44‍–‍33
Pittsburgh Rebels	86	67	.562	½	45‍–‍31	41‍–‍36
Kansas City Packers	81	72	.529	5½	46‍–‍31	35‍–‍41
Newark Peppers	80	72	.526	6	40‍–‍39	40‍–‍33
Buffalo Blues	74	78	.487	12	37‍–‍40	37‍–‍38
Brooklyn Tip-Tops	70	82	.461	16	34‍–‍40	36‍–‍42
Baltimore Terrapins	47	107	.305	40	24‍–‍51	23‍–‍56

=== Tie games ===
31 tie games (10 in AL, 13 in NL, 8 in FL), which are not factored into winning percentage or games behind (and were often replayed again) occurred throughout the season.

==== American League ====
- Boston Red Sox, 4
- Chicago White Sox, 1
- Cleveland Indians, 2
- Detroit Tigers, 2
- New York Yankees, 2
- Philadelphia Athletics, 2
- St. Louis Browns, 5
- Washington Senators, 2

==== National League ====
- Boston Braves, 5
- Brooklyn Robins, 2
- Chicago Cubs, 3
- Cincinnati Reds, 6
- New York Giants, 3
- Philadelphia Phillies, 1
- Pittsburgh Pirates, 2
- St. Louis Cardinals, 4

==== Federal League ====
- Brooklyn Tip-Tops, 1
- Buffalo Blues, 1
- Chicago Whales, 3
- Newark Peppers, 3
- Pittsburgh Rebels, 3
- St. Louis Terriers, 5

== Postseason ==
The postseason began on October 8 and ended on October 13 with the Boston Red Sox defeating the Philadelphia Phillies in the 1915 World Series in five games. The National and American Leagues refused a postseason against the Federal League.

=== Bracket ===
World Series
AL	Boston Red Sox	4
NL	Philadelphia Phillies	1

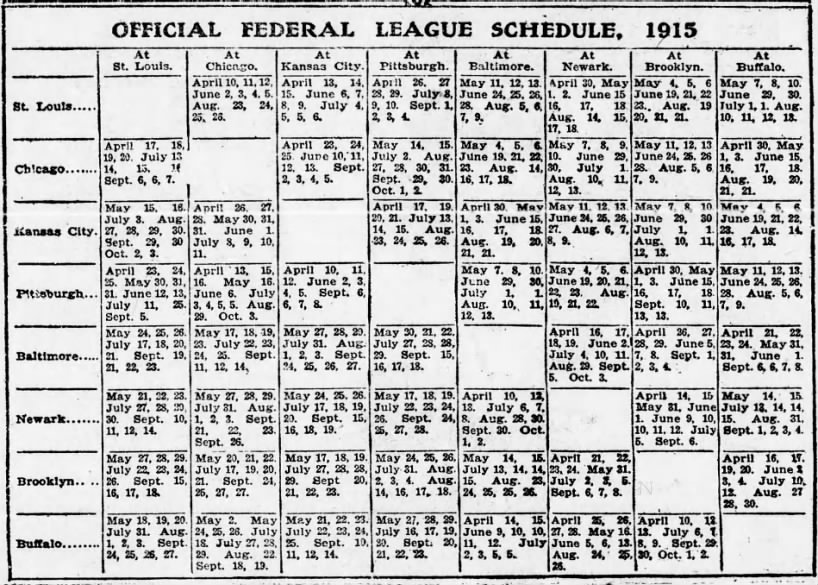
1915 schedule of the Federal League

== Managerial changes ==
=== Off-season ===
Team	Former Manager	New Manager
Brooklyn Tip-Tops	Bill Bradley	Lee Magee
Chicago Cubs	Hank O'Day	Roger Bresnahan
Chicago White Sox	Jimmy Callahan	Pants Rowland
New York Yankees	Roger Peckinpaugh	Bill Donovan
Philadelphia Phillies	Red Dooin	Pat Moran

=== In-season ===
Team	Former Manager	New Manager
Brooklyn Tip-Tops	Lee Magee	John Ganzel
Buffalo Blues	Larry Schlafly	Walter Blair
Buffalo Blues	Walter Blair	Harry Lord
Cleveland Indians	Joe Birmingham	Lee Fohl
Newark Peppers	Bill Phillips	Bill McKechnie

== League leaders ==
Any team shown in small text indicates a previous team a player was on during the season.

=== American League ===
Hitting leaders
Stat	Player	Total
AVG	Ty Cobb (DET)	.369
OPS	Ty Cobb (DET)	.973
HR	Braggo Roth (CLE/CWS)	7
RBI	Sam Crawford (DET); Bobby Veach (DET)	112
R	Ty Cobb (DET)	144
H	Ty Cobb (DET)	208
SB	Ty Cobb (DET)	96

Pitching leaders
Stat	Player	Total
W	Walter Johnson (WSH)	27
L	Weldon Wyckoff (PHA)	22
ERA	Smoky Joe Wood (BOS)	1.49
K	Walter Johnson (WSH)	203
IP	Walter Johnson (WSH)	336.2
SV	Carl Mays (BOS)	7
WHIP	Walter Johnson (WSH)	0.933

=== National League ===
Hitting leaders
Stat	Player	Total
AVG	Larry Doyle (NYG)	.320
OPS	Gavvy Cravath (PHI)	.902
HR	Gavvy Cravath (PHI)	24
RBI	Gavvy Cravath (PHI)	115
R	Gavvy Cravath (PHI)	89
H	Larry Doyle (NYG)	189
SB	Max Carey (PIT)	36

Pitching leaders
Stat	Player	Total
W	Grover Alexander^{1} (PHI)	31
L	Dick Rudolph (BSN); Pete Schneider (CIN)	19
ERA	Grover Alexander^{1} (PHI)	1.22
K	Grover Alexander^{1} (PHI)	241
IP	Grover Alexander (PHI)	376.1
SV	Tom Hughes (BSN)	9
WHIP	Grover Alexander (PHI)	0.842

^{1} National League Triple Crown pitching winner

=== Federal League ===
Hitting leaders
Stat	Player	Total
AVG	Benny Kauff (BKF)	.342
OPS	Benny Kauff (BKF)	.955
HR	Hal Chase (BUF)	17
RBI	Dutch Zwilling (CWH)	94
R	Babe Borton (SLT)	97
H	Jack Tobin (SLT)	184
SB	Benny Kauff (BKF)	55

Pitching leaders
Stat	Player	Total
W	George McConnell (CWH)	25
L	Jack Quinn (BAL)	22
ERA	Earl Moseley (NWK)	1.91
K	Dave Davenport (SLT)	229
IP	Dave Davenport (SLT)	392.2
SV	Hugh Bedient (BUF)	10
WHIP	Dave Davenport (SLT)	0.991

== Milestones ==
=== Batters ===
==== Cycles ====
- Heinie Groh (CIN):
  - Groh hit for his first cycle and sixth in franchise history, in game two of a doubleheader on July 5 against the Chicago Cubs.

==== Other batting accomplishments ====
- Ty Cobb (DET):
  - Recorded his 500th career stolen base in the eighth inning against the Washington Senators on May 9. He became the 17th player to reach this mark.
- Honus Wagner (PIT):
  - Recorded his 700th career stolen base in the fourth inning against the Chicago Cubs on August 17. He became the third player to reach this mark.

=== Pitchers ===
==== No-hitters ====
- Rube Marquard (BRO/NYG):
  - Marquard threw his first career no-hitter and sixth no-hitter in franchise history as a part of the New York Giants, by defeating the Brooklyn Robins 2–0 on April 15. Marquard walked two and struck out two.
- Frank Allen (PRB):
  - Allen threw his first career no-hitter and first no-hitter in franchise history, by defeating the St. Louis Terriers 2–0 on April 24. Allen walked four and struck out two.
- Claude Hendrix (CWH):
  - Hendrix threw his first career no-hitter and first no-hitter in franchise history, by defeating the Pittsburgh Rebels 10–0 on May 15. Hendrix walked three and struck out three.
- Alex Main (KC):
  - Main threw his first career no-hitter and first-no hitter in franchise history, by defeating the Buffalo Blues 5–0 on August 16. Main walked one and struck out seven.
- Jimmy Lavender (CHC):
  - Lavender threw his first career no-hitter and sixth no-hitter in franchise history, by defeating the New York Giants 2–0 in game one of a doubleheader on August 31. Lavender walked one and struck out eight.
- Dave Davenport (SLT):
  - Davenport threw his first career no-hitter and first no-hitter in franchise history, by defeating the Chicago Whales 3–0 in game one of a doubleheader on September 7. Davenport walked two and struck out three.

==== Other pitching accomplishments ====
- Eddie Plank (SLT):
  - Became the ninth member of the 300-win club, defeating the Newark Peppers on September 11, winning 12–5.

=== Miscellaneous ===
- Brooklyn Tip-Tops / Buffalo Blues:
  - Set a Major League record for most combined walks in a single game at 24, with the Brooklyn Tip-Tops walking 11 batters and the Buffalo Blues walking 13, on April 12 in a game that Brooklyn won 7–5.

== Home field attendance ==
Team name	Wins	%±	Home attendance	%±	Per game
Boston Red Sox	101	11.0%	539,885	12.2%	7,104
Chicago White Sox	93	32.9%	539,461	15.0%	6,829
Detroit Tigers	100	25.0%	476,105	14.4%	6,183
Philadelphia Phillies	90	21.6%	449,898	224.9%	5,920
New York Giants	69	-17.9%	391,850	7.6%	5,156
Boston Braves	83	-11.7%	376,283	-1.7%	4,824
Brooklyn Robins	80	6.7%	297,766	142.7%	3,818
New York Yankees	69	-1.4%	256,035	-28.8%	3,122
St. Louis Cardinals	72	-11.1%	252,666	-1.3%	3,119
Pittsburgh Pirates	73	5.8%	225,743	61.7%	2,858
Cincinnati Reds	71	18.3%	218,878	117.2%	2,771
Chicago Cubs	73	-6.4%	217,058	7.2%	2,819
Washington Senators	85	4.9%	167,332	-31.4%	2,092
Cleveland Indians	57	11.8%	159,285	-14.4%	2,069
St. Louis Browns	63	-11.3%	150,358	-38.6%	1,978
Philadelphia Athletics	43	-56.6%	146,223	-57.8%	1,976

Note: Attendance data for Federal League teams is unavailable.

== Venues ==
With the relocation of the Indianapolis Hoosiers from Indianapolis, Indiana to Newark, New Jersey as the Newark Peppers, they leave Federal League Park and move into Harrison Park.

The Boston Braves would play their last game at Fenway Park on July 26, having shared the park with the Boston Red Sox since the middle of 1914, and opened Braves Field on August 18, playing their final 26 of 78 home games and where they would go on to play for 38 seasons through 1952.

The Chicago Cubs would play their final game at West Side Park on October 3 against the St. Louis Cardinals, moving into the home of the Chicago Whales (who would fold before the 1916 season), Weeghman Park for the start of the 1916 season.

For games 3 and 4 of the World Series, the Boston Red Sox use the Boston Braves home of Braves Field due to its larger capacity over their home at Fenway Park (40,000 to 27,000). This was the first year in a row where a World Series winning Red Sox used Braves Field.

== See also ==
- 1915 in baseball (Events, Births, Deaths)
