= Harry Moran =

American baseball player (1889–1962)

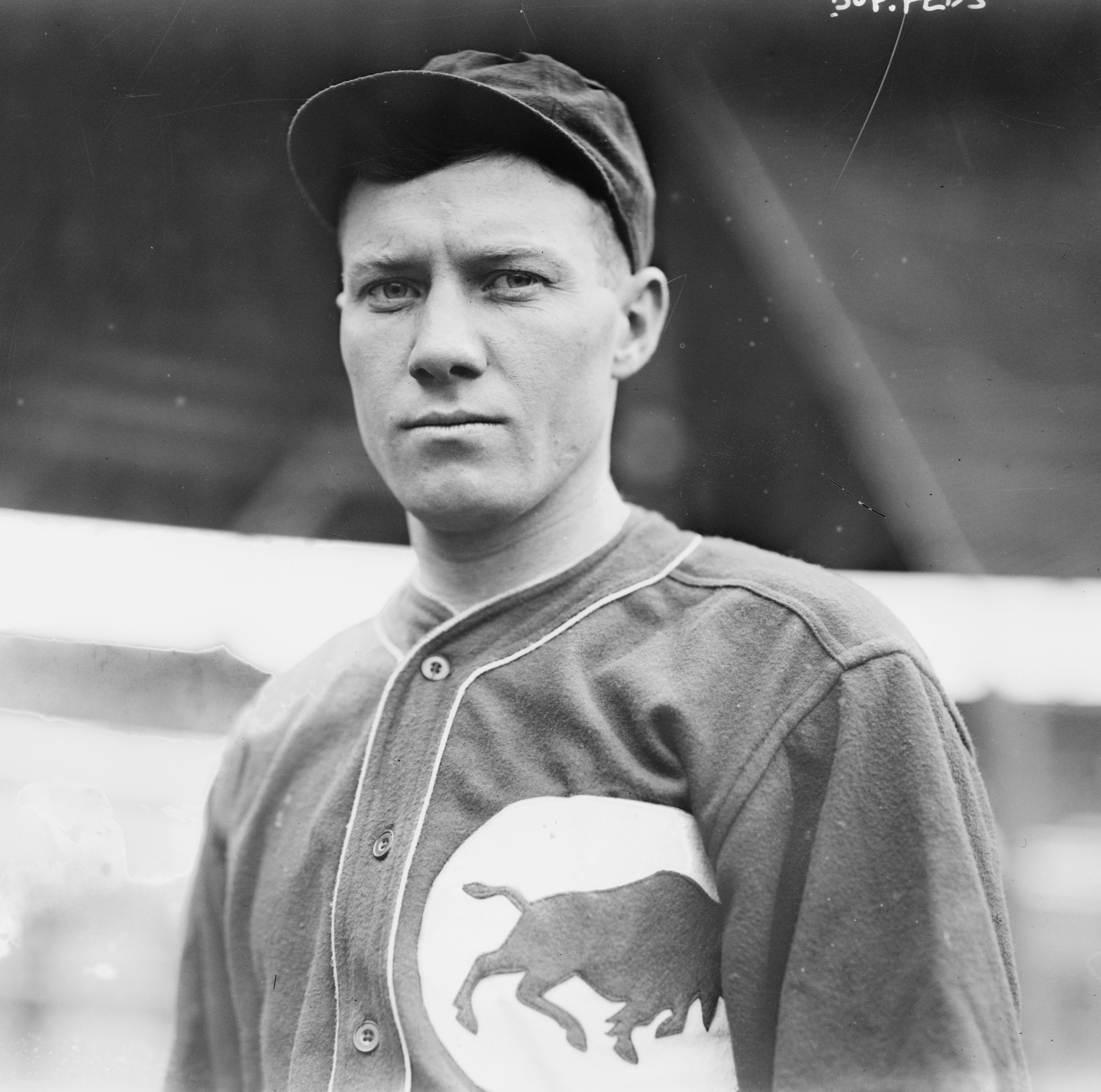
- Pitcher
- Born: April 2, 1889; Slater, West Virginia, U.S.
- Died: November 28, 1962 (aged 73); Beckley, West Virginia, U.S.
- Batted: Left Threw: Left

MLB debut
- June 23, 1912, for the Detroit Tigers

Last MLB appearance
- October 3, 1915, for the Newark Peppers

MLB statistics
- Win–loss record: 23–17
- Earned run average: 3.34
- Strikeouts: 163
- Stats at Baseball Reference

Teams
- Detroit Tigers (1912); Buffalo Buffeds (1914); Newark Peppers (1915)

Harry Edwin Moran (April 2, 1889 – November 28, 1962) was an American Major League Baseball pitcher. Moran was born in Slater, West Virginia, which was renamed in 1901 to Thayer. He was a lefty and played all or part of three seasons in the majors: 1912 for the Detroit Tigers, 1914 for the Buffalo Buffeds, and 1915 for the Newark Peppers. He started playing professional baseball on June 23, 1912, with the Detroit Tigers.
