= Roxey Roach =

American baseball player (1882–1947)

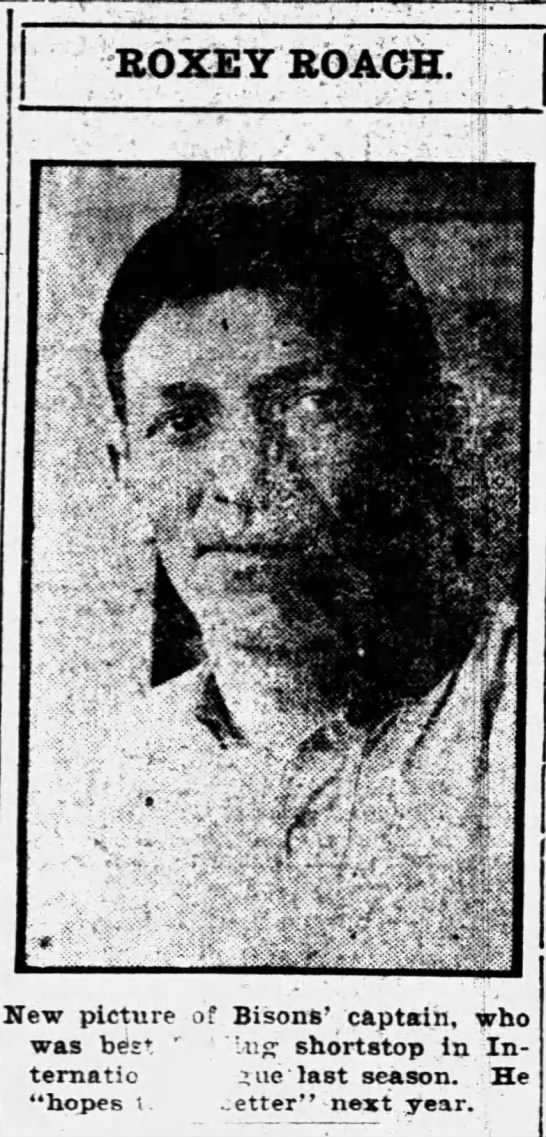
- Shortstop
- Born: November 28, 1882; Anita, Pennsylvania, U.S.
- Died: December 26, 1947 (aged 65); Bay City, Michigan, U.S.
- Batted: Right Threw: Right

MLB debut
- April 26, 1910, for the New York Highlanders

Last MLB appearance
- September 30, 1915, for the Buffalo Blues

MLB statistics
- Games played: 177
- At bats: 608
- Hits: 151
- Stats at Baseball Reference

Teams
- New York Highlanders (1910–1911); Washington Senators (1912); Buffalo Blues (1915)

Wilbur Charles Roach (November 28, 1882 – December 26, 1947) was an American Major League Baseball shortstop. He played for the New York Highlanders in 1910–1911, the Washington Senators in 1912, and the Buffalo Buffeds/Blues in 1915. In 177 career games, Roach had 151 hits in 608 at bats for a .248 batting average.

After retiring from professional baseball in 1918, he became a car dealer until 1941 and an employee of a gypsum plant in National City, Michigan until his death. He moved to Tawas City, Michigan in 1924 and lived there for the rest of his life. Dealing with a heart condition and several health issues since 1942, he died of a heart attack at Samaritan Hospital in Bay City, Michigan on December 26, 1947. Roach would be buried in a cemetery in Tawas City on December 28.
