= Landrus, Pennsylvania =

Landrus
- Interactive map of Landrus
- Coordinates: 41.642222°N 77.206389°W
- Country: United States
- State: Pennsylvania
- County: Tioga County

Population
  - Total: 0
- Time zone: UTC-5 (Eastern Daylight Time)

Landrus is an abandoned town in Tioga County, Pennsylvania, which formerly existed as a lumber and coal mining town. Its land currently is within the Tioga State Forest near Bear Run Trail and Babb Creek. Landrus has a population of 0 and was abandoned between 1910 and 1915 after being founded in 1882 as a sawmill town. At its peak, Landrus likely reached a maximum population of around 100 and was also likely the location of the world's first electric powered coal mine. Landrus, settled where nothing but forest was previously, was so named after Henry J. Landrus, manager of the Blossburg Coal Company.

== People from Landrus ==
Walter Blair (1883–1948), American Major League Baseball player born in Landrus

== See also ==
- List of ghost towns in Pennsylvania
