= Biff Schlitzer =

American baseball player (1884–1948)

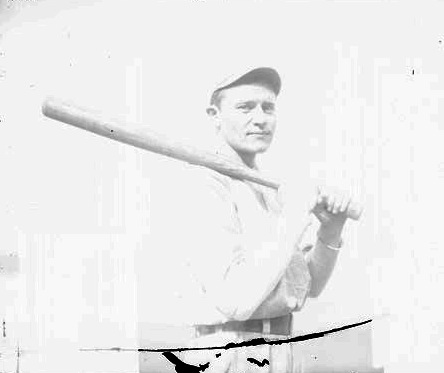
- Schlitzer with the Athletics in 1908.
- Pitcher
- Born: December 4, 1884; Rochester, New York, U.S.
- Died: January 4, 1948 (aged 63); Wellesley Hills, Massachusetts, U.S.
- Batted: Right Threw: Right

MLB debut
- April 17, 1908, for the Philadelphia Athletics

Last MLB appearance
- May 1, 1914, for the Buffalo Buffeds

MLB statistics
- Win–loss record: 10-15
- Earned run average: 3.60
- Strikeouts: 87
- Stats at Baseball Reference

Teams
- Philadelphia Athletics (1908–1909); Boston Red Sox (1909); Buffalo Buffeds (1914)

Victor Joseph "Biff" Schlitzer (December 4, 1884 – January 4, 1948) was an American pitcher in Major League Baseball who played from 1908 through 1914 for the Philadelphia Athletics (1908–09) and Boston Red Sox (1909) of the American League, and with the Buffalo Buffeds of the Federal League (1914). Listed at 5 ft 11 in (1.80 m), 175 lb (79 kg), Schlitzer batted and threw right-handed. A native of Rochester, New York, he attended University of Dayton.

In a three-season career, Schlitzer posted a 10–15 record with 87 strikeouts and a 3.60 earned run average in 44 appearances, including 29 starts, 16 complete games, two shutouts, one save, and 217 1/3 innings of work.

Schlitzer died on January 4, 1948, at the age of 63 in Wellesley, Massachusetts. He is buried at Forest Hill Cemetery in Utica, New York.
