= Bob Smith (pitcher, born 1890) =

American baseball player (1890–1965)

- Pitcher
- Born: July 20, 1890; Woodbury, Vermont, U.S.
- Died: December 27, 1965 (aged 75); West Los Angeles, California, U.S.
- Batted: Right Threw: Right

MLB debut
- April 19, 1913, for the Chicago White Sox

Last MLB appearance
- April 19, 1915, for the Buffalo Blues

MLB statistics
- Win–loss record: 0–0
- Earned run average: 4.31
- Strikeouts: 14
- Stats at Baseball Reference

Teams
- Chicago White Sox (1913); Buffalo Blues (1914–1915)

Robert Ashley Smith (July 20, 1890 – December 27, 1965) was an American professional baseball player who played pitcher in the Major Leagues from 1913 to 1915. Smith played for the Chicago White Sox and Buffalo Blues.

After his baseball career, Smith served in the United States Army during World War I and worked as a real estate broker.
