= Landru (disambiguation) =

Henri Désiré Landru (1869–1922) was a French serial killer.

Landru may also refer to:

- Landrú, byline of Argentine political cartoonist Juan Carlos Colombres (1923–2017)
- Landru (film), a 1963 French film about the serial killer
- Landru, a character in the 1967 Star Trek episode "The Return of the Archons"
