= Del Young (infielder) =

American baseball player (1912–1979)

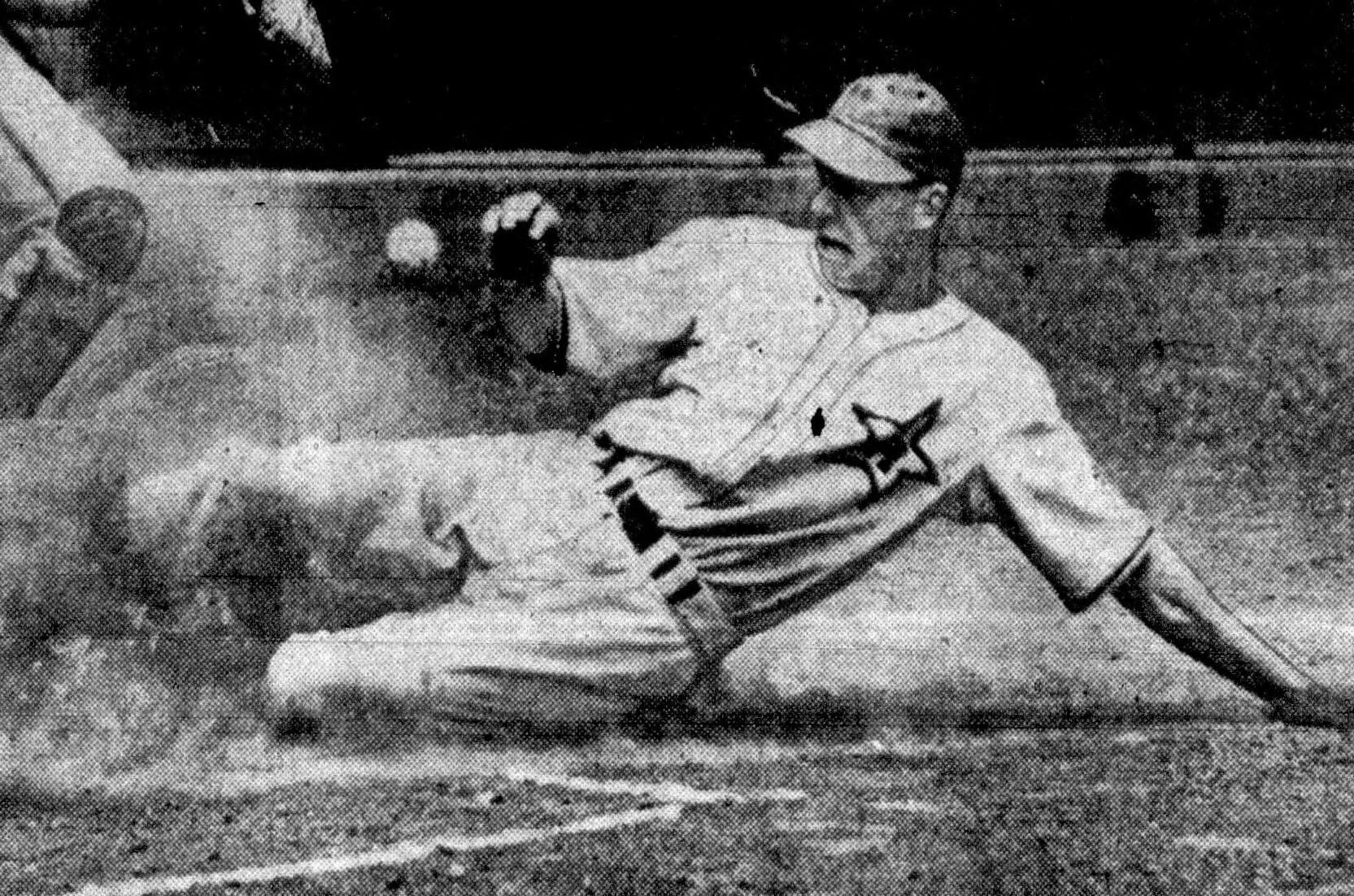
- Young in 1942
- Infielder
- Born: May 11, 1912; Cleveland, Ohio, U.S.
- Died: December 8, 1979 (aged 67); San Francisco, California, U.S.
- Batted: Both Threw: Right

MLB debut
- April 19, 1937, for the Philadelphia Phillies

Last MLB appearance
- June 12, 1940, for the Philadelphia Phillies

MLB statistics
- Batting average: .224
- Home runs: 3
- Runs batted in: 76
- Stats at Baseball Reference

Teams
- Philadelphia Phillies (1937–1940)

Delmer Edward Young (May 11, 1912 – December 8, 1979) was an American professional baseball player. Young played in four Major League Baseball seasons, all with the Philadelphia Phillies. His father, Delmar John Young, also played in Major League Baseball.

A middle infielder, Young played 148 games at shortstop and 147 at second base. He also had an extensive career in minor league baseball spanning seventeen seasons from 1931–47. He played the final five seasons of his career with the San Francisco Seals of the Pacific Coast League, although he played only sparingly the last two.

== See also ==
- List of second-generation Major League Baseball players
