= Bill Louden =

American baseball player (1883–1935)

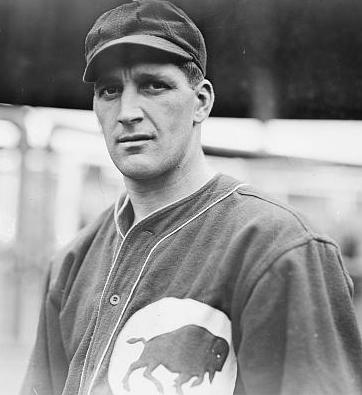
- Louden in 1914 with the Buffalo Buffeds
- Second baseman / Shortstop
- Born: August 27, 1883; Pittsburgh, Pennsylvania, U.S.
- Died: December 8, 1935 (aged 52); Piedmont, West Virginia, U.S.
- Batted: Right Threw: Right

MLB debut
- September 13, 1907, for the New York Highlanders

Last MLB appearance
- September 18, 1916, for the Cincinnati Reds

MLB statistics
- Batting average: .261
- Home runs: 12
- Runs batted in: 202
- Stats at Baseball Reference

Teams
- New York Highlanders (1907); Detroit Tigers (1912–1913); Buffalo Buffeds/Blues (1914–1915); Cincinnati Reds (1916)

William P. "Baldy" Louden (August 27, 1883 – December 8, 1935) was an American baseball player. He played professional baseball from 1906 to 1920, including six years in Major League Baseball as an infielder with the New York Highlanders (1907), Detroit Tigers (1912–1913), Buffalo Buffeds (1914–1915), and Cincinnati Reds (1916). He appeared in 603 major league games (313 at second base, 176 at shortstop) and compiled a .261 batting average and a .355 on-base percentage.

== Early years ==
Louden was born in Pittsburgh, Pennsylvania, in 1883.

== Professional baseball ==
Louden began his professional baseball career playing with the Allegheny Hilldales in the Pittsburgh sandlots, before moving on to the Texas League where he played for the Greenville Hunters and Dallas Giants in 1906 and 1907.

Louden was acquired by the New York Highlanders in August 1907 and made his major league debut the following month. He appeared in 11 games with the Yankees and compiled a .111 batting average and .273 on-base percentage.

After his brief tryout with New York, Louden spent the next four years in the minor leagues with the Montreal Royals in 1908 and the Newark Indians from 1909 to 1911.

Louden returned to the major leagues in 1912 with the Detroit Tigers. He appeared in 122 games for the 1912 Tigers, including 87 at second base and 26 at third base, and compiled a .241 batting average and .352 on-base percentage. He led the American League's second basemen with a 5.61 range factor — 0.86 points higher than the league average for second basemen. He remained with the Tigers in 1913, appearing in 76 games with a .241 batting average and .344 on-base percentage.

In 1914, Louden jumped to the Buffalo Buffeds of the newly formed Federal League. He appeared in 126 games in 1914 as Buffalo's regular shortstop. He ranked among the Federal League's leaders in 1914 with a .313 batting average (eighth), a .391 on-base percentage (tenth), and 35 stolen bases (eighth). The following year, he appeared in 141 games for Buffalo but his batting average dropped 32 points to .281.

When the Federal League folded in 1916, Louden moved to the Cincinnati Reds. He appeared in 134 games, 108 at second base and 23 at shortstop, and compiled a .219 batting average and .313 on-base percentage. He led the National League second basemen with a .968 fielding percentage. He also had a range factor of 5.40 — 0.66 points higher than the National League average for second basemen.

In February 1917, Louden was traded to Kansas City. Louden finished his professional baseball career in 1920 as a player-manager of the Martinsburg Mountaineers in the Blue Ridge League.

== Later years ==
After retiring from baseball, Louden settled in Piedmont, West Virginia, where he operated a garage. He died in 1935 at age 52 in Piedmont.
