= Chubby Snyder =

American baseball player (1890–1954)

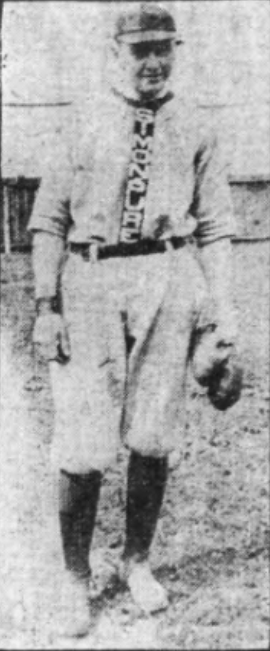
- Catcher
- Born: August 20, 1890; Buffalo, New York
- Died: March 24, 1954 (aged 63); Buffalo, New York
- Batted: Unknown Threw: Unknown

MLB debut
- 1914, for the Buffalo Buffeds

Last MLB appearance
- 1914, for the Buffalo Buffeds

MLB statistics
- Plate appearances: 1
- Bases on balls: 1
- Hits: 0
- Stats at Baseball Reference

Teams
- Buffalo Buffeds (1914)

Alfred Joseph "Chubby" Snyder (August 20, 1890 – March 24, 1954), born Alfred Joseph Schneider, was an American professional baseball player who played one game with the Major League Baseball (MLB) Buffalo Buffeds. In that game, Snyder had one plate appearance where he walked. Before playing in the MLB, Snyder played semi-professional baseball in his home-town of Buffalo, New York. Later in his life he served in World War I and worked as a contractor.

== Early life ==
Alfred Joseph Schneider, commonly known as "Chubby Snyder", was born on August 20, 1890, in Buffalo, New York, to Frank and Margret Schneider both of New York. Frank Schneider was of Danish and German ancestry, while Margret Schneider was full German. Frank Schneider worked as a contractor. Chubby Snyder had two siblings, a sister, Willis Maischoss (née) Schneider and a brother, Frank L. Schneider.

== Baseball career ==
Before 1914, Snyder played semi-professional baseball in his hometown of Buffalo, New York. In 1914, Snyder joined the Major League Baseball (MLB) Buffalo Buffeds of the short-lived Federal League. Until 2010, Jack Snyder who played with the Brooklyn Robins in 1917 was credited as playing for the Buffeds in 1914. Members of the Society for American Baseball Research discovered that it was in fact Chubby Snyder. He played just one game with Buffalo that season, on June 13. A discrepancy exists in the official records; most official records of the game show Chubby did not have a plate appearance, and only appeared as a defensive replacement. Lifetime records at Baseball Reference show that Snyder made one plate appearance in his lone game, in which he drew a walk. Even the actual game box score for June 13 at Baseball Reference, however, shows Snyder never making a plate appearance or drawing a walk. Defensively, he played catcher. Snyder emerged in 1916 as a member a semi-pro baseball team called Pine Ridge.

== Later life ==
After his baseball career was over, Snyder served in World War I. He later became a member of the Niagara Falls Rotary Club. Snyder worked as a contractor and was a member of the National Association of Tile and Marble Contractors. He attended St. John de LaSalle Church. On March 24, 1954, he died at Millard Fillmore Hospital in Buffalo, New York.
