= Rube Marshall =

American baseball player

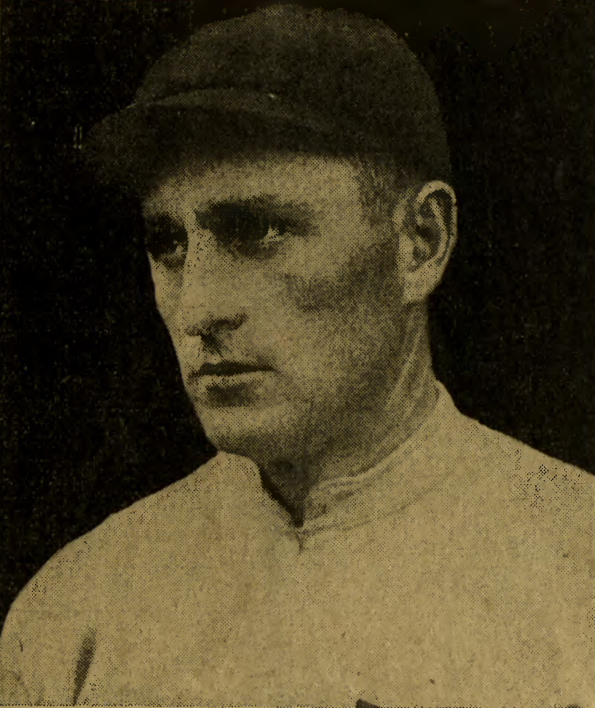
- Pitcher
- Born: July 19, 1890; Salineville, Ohio, U.S.
- Died: June 11, 1980 (aged 89); Dover, Ohio, U.S.
- Batted: Right Threw: Right

MLB debut
- September 28, 1912, for the Philadelphia Phillies

Last MLB appearance
- September 26, 1915, for the Buffalo Blues

MLB statistics
- Win–loss record: 8–10
- Strikeouts: 90
- Earned run average: 4.17
- Stats at Baseball Reference

Teams
- Philadelphia Phillies (1912–1914); Buffalo Blues (1915)

Roy De Verne "Rube" Marshall (July 19, 1890 – June 11, 1980) was an American Major League Baseball pitcher. He played all or part of four seasons in the majors, from 1912 until 1915, for the Philadelphia Phillies and Buffalo Blues.

== Sources ==
- Career statistics from Baseball Reference · Baseball Reference (Minors) · Retrosheet · Baseball Almanac
