= Luther Bonin =

American baseball player (1888–1966)

- Right fielder
- Born: January 13, 1888; Greenhill, Indiana, U.S.
- Died: January 3, 1966 (aged 77); Sycamore, Ohio, U.S.
- Batted: Left Threw: Right

MLB debut
- April 13, 1913, for the St. Louis Browns

Last MLB appearance
- April 13, 1914, for the Buffalo Buffeds

MLB statistics
- Batting average: .182
- Home runs: 0
- Runs batted in: 4
- Stats at Baseball Reference

Teams
- St. Louis Browns (1913); Buffalo Buffeds (1914)

Ernest Luther "Bonnie" Bonin (January 13, 1888 – January 3, 1966) was an American Major League Baseball right fielder who played with the St. Louis Browns in 1913 and the Buffalo Buffeds in 1914.

== Career ==
Bonin made his professional baseball debut in 1910, playing for the Canton Deubers of the Ohio–Pennsylvania League. He played in 124 games for Canton, finishing with a .281 batting average. He played in the American Association in 1911 with the Columbus Senators.

On April 13, 1913, Bonin made his Major League Baseball debut for the St. Louis Browns, in a game against the Chicago White Sox. He pinch hit, and did not reach base. It was his only major league game of the season, and he returned to the Senators in the American Association for the remainder of the season.

Bonin returned to the majors in 1914, with the Buffalo Buffeds of the Federal League. He played in 20 games, collecting 14 hits in 76 at bats. He batted .184, and played all of his games as a right fielder. He did not play professional baseball after 1914.
