= Everett Booe =

American baseball player (1891–1969)

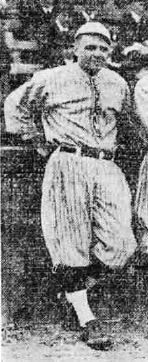
- Outfielder
- Born: September 28, 1891; Mocksville, North Carolina, U.S.
- Died: March 21, 1969 (aged 77); Kenedy, Texas, U.S.
- Batted: Left Threw: Right

MLB debut
- April 13, 1913, for the Pittsburgh Pirates

Last MLB appearance
- August 29, 1914, for the Buffalo Buffeds

MLB statistics
- Batting average: .219
- Home runs: 0
- Runs batted in: 22
- Stats at Baseball Reference

Teams
- Pittsburgh Pirates (1913); Indianapolis Hoosiers (1914); Buffalo Buffeds (1914)

Everett Little Booe (September 28, 1891 – March 21, 1969) was an American professional baseball player. He played in two seasons in Major League Baseball, primarily as an outfielder. He played part of 1913 for the Pittsburgh Pirates, then jumped to the Federal League in 1914. He played for two teams that season, the Indianapolis Hoosiers and the Buffalo Buffeds.

Booe also had an extensive minor league career, playing from 1910 until 1930. From 1926 to the end of his playing career, he served as manager for six different minor league teams. In 1927, he managed the Danville Veterans to the championship of the Three-I League while batting .260 in 87 games.

Booe attended Davidson College where he competed in baseball, football, and track and field.

== Head coaching record ==
=== Football ===
| Year | Team | Overall | Conference | Standing | Bowl/playoffs |
|---|---|---|---|---|---|
Presbyterian Blue Hose (Independent) (1913)
| 1913 | Presbyterian | 5–3 | | | |
| Presbyterian: | | 5–3 | | | |
| Total: | | 5–3 | | | |
