= Harry Lord =

American baseball player (1882–1948)

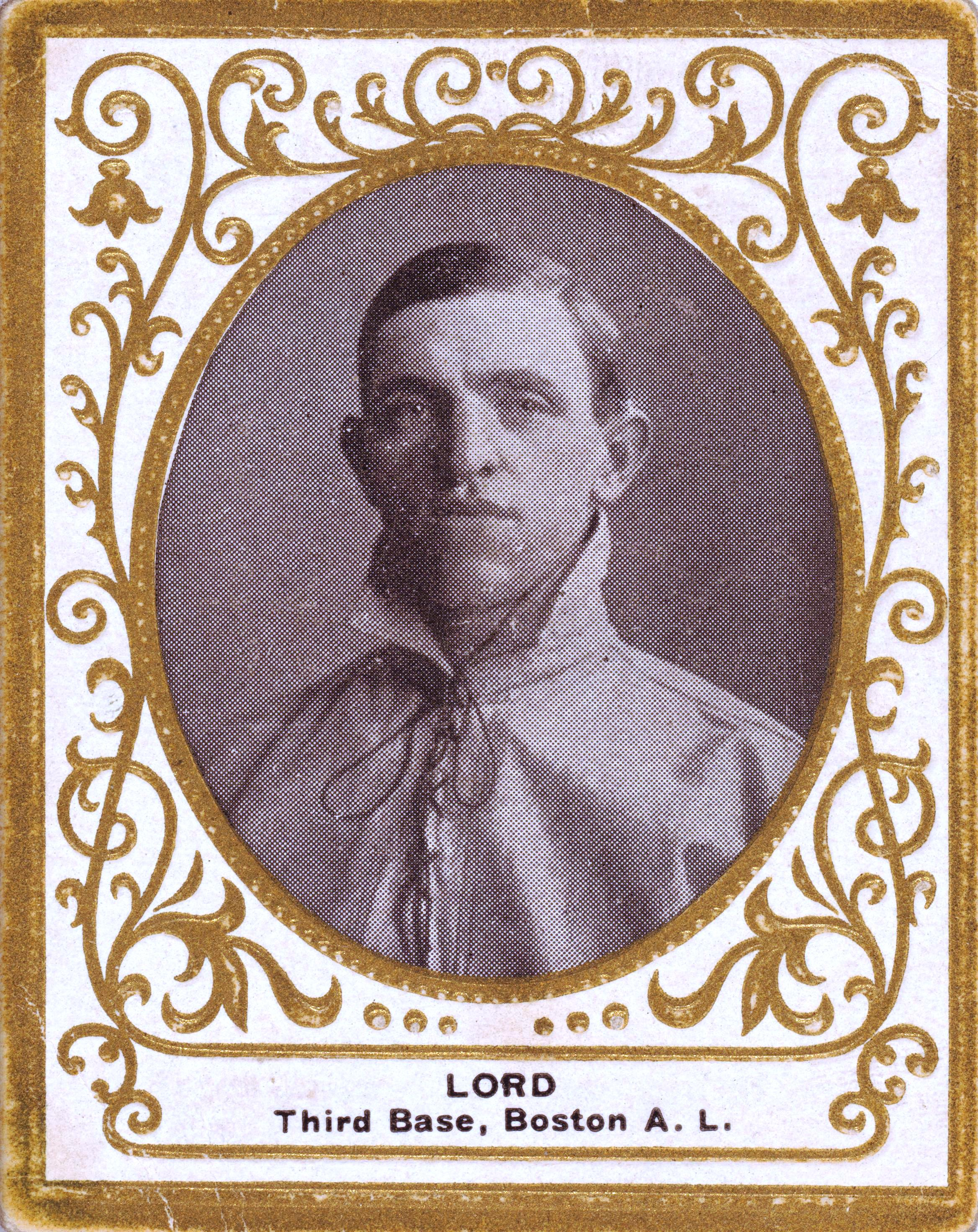
- Third baseman
- Born: March 8, 1882; Porter, Maine, U.S.
- Died: August 9, 1948 (aged 66); Westbrook, Maine, U.S.
- Batted: Left Threw: Right

MLB debut
- September 25, 1907, for the Boston Americans

Last MLB appearance
- September 27, 1915, for the Buffalo Blues

MLB statistics
- Batting average: .278
- Home runs: 14
- Runs batted in: 294
- Stolen bases: 208
- Stats at Baseball Reference

Teams
- Boston Americans/Red Sox (1907–1910); Chicago White Sox (1910–1914); Buffalo Blues (1915)

Harry Donald Lord (March 8, 1882 – August 9, 1948) was an American professional baseball player who played for the Boston Americans/Red Sox, Chicago White Sox and Buffalo Blues from 1907 to 1915.

== Early life and education ==
Harry Lord was born in Porter, Maine, on March 8, 1882, and played football and baseball at Bridgton Academy. He attended Bates College for one year (1904-1905) but did not graduate, while playing for the baseball team. Lord was 25 years old when he made his Major League Baseball debut on September 25, 1907, with the Boston Americans. Harry Lord was a third baseman for eleven years (1906–1915), one in college (1905), nine in the majors (1907–1915) and two in the minors (1906–1907). His first professional engagement was at Kezar Falls, Maine.

== Professional baseball career ==
=== Eastern league ===
Lord broke into organized baseball at age 24, in 1906, with Worcester in the New England League and the next year moved up to Providence in the Eastern League. His performance there caught the attention of the Boston Americans and, at 26 years of age, he began playing professionally on September 25, 1907, for Boston. He played with the team for three years. On May 30, 1908, Washington Senators's Jerry Freeman's single was the only hit allowed by Boston's Cy Young. Lord had four hits to back Young's pitching. On April 21, 1909, Lord stole home on the front end of a triple steal in the bottom of the seventh, with Tris Speaker taking third and Doc Gessler taking second. The Red Sox won the game, 6-2.

On June 30, 1910, the Philadelphia Athletics held a benefit for the widow and children of Mike "Doc" Powers, who had died a few days after the team opened Shibe Park in 1909. Players from the Washington, New York and Boston AL teams took part in a six-inning game against the A's, and in pre-game contests before 12,000 fans. In one of these contests Lord was timed from home to first in 3.4 seconds.

==== The Red Sox (July 10, 1910 – August 9, 1910) ====
When on July 10, 1910, a Walter Johnson fastball broke Lord's finger, the stellar play of his substitute Clyde Engle made Lord expendable. In 1910, the Red Sox fielded ten men who had been or would become MLB managers – no other team in history as ever had more. Lord was joined in this feat by Bill Carrigan, Gavvy Cravath, Doc Gessler, Deacon McGuire, Tris Speaker, Jake Stahl, Bob Unglaub, Heinie Wagner, and Cy Young.

==== Chicago White Sox (August 9, 1910 – May 18, 1914) ====
He was traded to the Chicago White Sox on August 9, 1910, with Amby McConnell to the Chicago White Sox for Frank Smith, and Billy Purtell.

In 1911, while playing in Major League Baseball, he had 180 Hits, 103 Runs, 18 Doubles, 18 Triples, 3 Home Runs, 61 RBI and 43 Stolen Bases at (.321/.364/.433) in 141 Games.

On May 8, 1912, the White Sox beat the Washington Senators 7–6, ending Walter Johnson's five-game win streak; Johnson gave up two 2-run home runs, one to Lord in the first and another to Ping Bodie in the fifth. He played for the Pale Hose until 1914 but then got into a salary squabble with owner Charlie Comiskey.

He held out on the Sox, returning for a few games only to demand his release, and disappeared again when Comiskey turned him down.

=== Federal League ===
==== Buffalo Buffeds (1914–1915) ====
In 1915, the Buffalo Buffeds of the Federal League announced they had signed Lord. When he reported to Chicago in 1914, he was blacklisted by mutual consent of the American and National League owners.

For the 1915 season, the Buffalo team changed its name from the Buffeds to the Blues. Manager Larry Schlafly, was fired form his position June 4. He was replaced temporarily by catcher Walter Blair and then by Lord, who had joined the Blues only eight days before. Buffalo star Hal Chase and Lord were business associates and close friends. Once the managerial change was made, Chase, who had been slumping under Schafly, suddenly came to life.

He batted .328 for the remainder of the 1915 season and led the Federal League in home runs with 17. Lord and Chase took them from the cellar to sixth place with a (59-48) record.

When the Federal League folded, Lord was still blacklisted in the remaining Major Leagues. Lord played his last MLB game on September 27, 1915, at age 33.

== Life after baseball ==
He managed several minor league teams, ending his baseball career in 1925 at age 43.

At times, Lord inspired his teammates with his hustle, earning him the White Sox captaincy; at other times, it seemed he didn't want to play. The two years he batted more than .310 (1909 and 1911), he followed with marks of .267. In 1913, he set single-season American League records for fewest chances accepted (364) and fewest assists (221) by a third baseman in 150 or more games.

After managing in the minors, he entered a number of business ventures in Portland, Maine. His hobbies were "my son and my daughter".

== Death and legacy ==
He died at age 66 on August 9, 1948, in Hospital in Westbrook, Maine, where he had been the last four months of his life and is buried at Riverside Cemetery in Kezar Falls. Surviving him were his wife, his daughter and his son.

=== Overall record ===
Overall in MLB, he had 1,026 Hits, 509 Runs, 107 Doubles, 70 Triples, 14 Home Runs, 294 RBI and 208 Stolen Bases at (.278/.326/.356) in 972 Games.

== See also ==
- List of Major League Baseball career stolen bases leaders
- List of Major League Baseball player-managers
- List of Bates College people
