= Art Watson =

American baseball player (1884–1950)

- Catcher
- Born: January 11, 1884; Jefferson, Indiana, U.S.
- Died: May 9, 1950 (aged 66); Buffalo, New York, U.S.
- Batted: Left Threw: Right

MLB debut
- May 19, 1914, for the Brooklyn Tip-Tops

Last MLB appearance
- August 7, 1915, for the Buffalo Blues

MLB statistics
- Batting average: .337
- Home runs: 2
- RBI: 17
- Stats at Baseball Reference

Teams
- Brooklyn Tip-Tops (1914–1915); Buffalo Blues (1915)

Art Watson (January 11, 1884 – May 9, 1950), nicknamed "Watty", was an American catcher in Major League Baseball in 1914 and 1915.

== Sources ==
- Career statistics from Baseball Reference · Baseball Reference (Minors) · Retrosheet · Baseball Almanac
