= Art LaVigne =

American baseball player (1885-1950)

- Catcher
- Born: January 26, 1885; Worcester, Massachusetts, U.S.
- Died: July 18, 1950 (aged 65); Worcester, Massachusetts, U.S.
- Batted: Right Threw: Right

MLB debut
- April 24, 1914, for the Buffalo Buffeds

Last MLB appearance
- October 5, 1914, for the Buffalo Buffeds

MLB statistics
- Batting average: .156
- Home runs: 0
- Runs batted in: 4
- Stats at Baseball Reference

Teams
- Buffalo Buffeds (1914)

Arthur David LaVigne (January 26, 1885 – July 18, 1950) was an American Major League Baseball catcher who played for the Buffalo Buffeds in 1914.

LaVigne died at his home on May Street in Worcester, Massachusetts, on July 18, 1950. He was buried in Hope Cemetery.
