= Joe Houser =

American baseball player (1891-1953)

- Pitcher
- Born: July 3, 1891; Steubenville, Ohio, U.S.
- Died: January 3, 1953 (aged 61); Orlando, Florida, U.S.
- Batted: Left Threw: Left

MLB debut
- April 24, 1914, for the Buffalo Buffeds

Last MLB appearance
- July 3, 1914, for the Buffalo Buffeds

MLB statistics
- Win–loss record: 0–1
- Earned run average: 5.48
- Strikeouts: 6
- Stats at Baseball Reference

Teams
- Buffalo Buffeds (1914)

Joseph William Houser (July 3, 1891 – January 3, 1953) was an American Major League Baseball pitcher who played for the Buffalo Buffeds in 1914.
