= Bill Collins (outfielder) =

American baseball player (1882–1961)

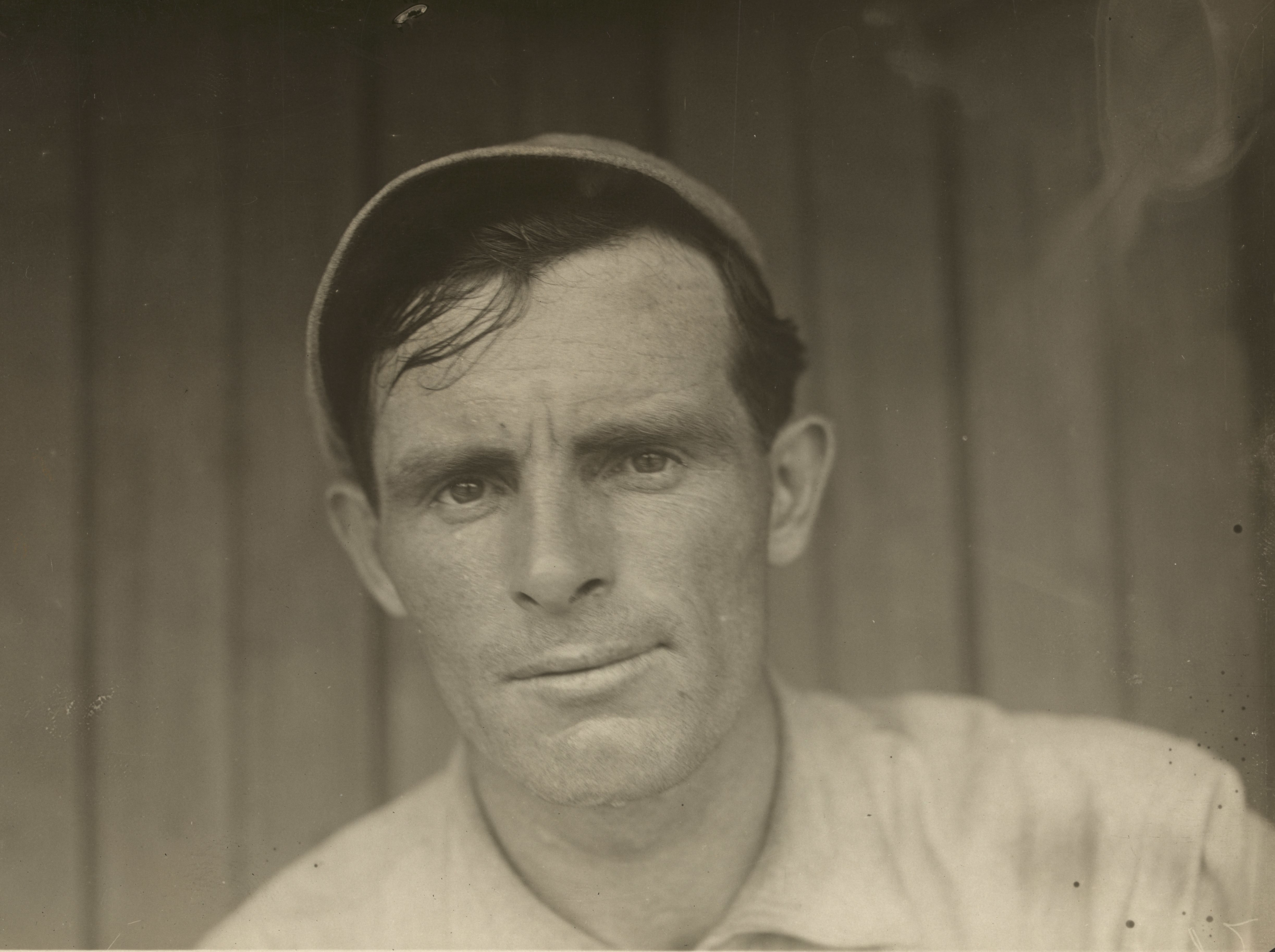
- Outfielder
- Born: March 27, 1882; Chesterton, Indiana, U.S.
- Died: June 26, 1961 (aged 79); San Bernardino, California, U.S.
- Batted: Switch Threw: Right

MLB debut
- April 14, 1910, for the Boston Doves

Last MLB appearance
- October 5, 1914, for the Buffalo Buffeds

MLB statistics
- Batting average: .224
- Home runs: 3
- Runs batted in: 54
- Stats at Baseball Reference

Teams
- Boston Doves/Rustlers (1910–1911); Chicago Cubs (1911); Brooklyn Dodgers (1913); Buffalo Buffeds (1914)

William Shirley Collins (March 27, 1882 – June 26, 1961) was an American outfielder in Major League Baseball.

On October 6, 1910, while playing for the Boston Doves against the Philadelphia Phillies, Collins became the first major league player to hit for the natural cycle (a single, double, triple, and home run, in that order).

In 228 games over four seasons, Collins posted a .224 batting average (173-for-773) with 91 runs, 3 home runs, 54 RBIs, 42 stolen bases and 54 bases on balls. He finished his career with an overall .967 fielding percentage playing at all three outfield positions.

== See also ==
- List of Major League Baseball players to hit for the cycle

Achievements
Preceded by Danny Murphy	Hitting for the cycle October 6, 1910	Succeeded by Home Run Baker
