= Tolbert Dalton =

American baseball player (1885–1950)

- Outfielder
- Born: July 3, 1885; Henderson, Tennessee, U.S.
- Died: February 17, 1950 (aged 64); Pittsburgh, Pennsylvania, U.S.
- Batted: Right Threw: Right

MLB debut
- June 20, 1910, for the Brooklyn Superbas

Last MLB appearance
- May 17, 1916, for the Detroit Tigers

MLB statistics
- Batting average: .286
- Home runs: 4
- Runs batted in: 112
- Stats at Baseball Reference

Teams
- Brooklyn Superbas/Dodgers (1910, 1914); Buffalo Blues (1915); Detroit Tigers (1916)

Tolbert Percy Dalton (July 3, 1885 – February 17, 1950) was an American professional baseball player who played outfield in Major League Baseball from 1910 to 1916. He attended the University of Virginia. He mysteriously vanished on July 4, 1948, from Catonsville, Maryland, while walking to a church service. In March 2012, it was discovered that Dalton had died of a heart ailment in a Pittsburgh hospital in 1950.

In 345 games over four major league seasons, Dalton posted a .286 batting average (333-for-1163) with 167 runs, 39 doubles, 15 triples, 4 home runs, 112 RBIs, 52 stolen bases, 129 bases on balls, .362 on-base percentage and .356 slugging percentage. Often attributed as "Jack", he finished his career with a .966 fielding percentage playing at all three outfield positions. He later served in the United States Army.
