= Ed Porray =

American baseball player (1888-1954)

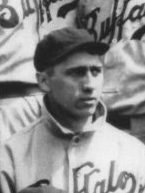
- Pitcher
- Born: December 5, 1888; At sea, Atlantic Ocean
- Died: July 13, 1954 (aged 65); Lackawaxen, Pennsylvania, US
- Batted: Right Threw: Right

Federal League debut
- April 17, 1914, for the Buffalo Buffeds

Last Federal League appearance
- May 1, 1914, for the Buffalo Buffeds

Federal League statistics
- Win–loss record: 0–1
- Earned run average: 4.35
- Strikeouts: 0
- Stats at Baseball Reference

Teams
- Buffalo Buffeds (1914)

Edmund Joseph Porray (December 5, 1888 – July 13, 1954) was a major league pitcher. A right-handed pitcher, he had a brief major league career in which he pitched in 3 games for the 1914 Buffalo Buffeds of the Federal League, compiling a 0–1 record with a 4.35 earned run average in 10 1/3 innings pitched.

During World War I, Porray served overseas as a pianist entertaining the troops. After the war, he toured on the Keith and Orpheum vaudeville circuits.

Today, Porray is best remembered for his unusual birthplace, as he is one of two major league baseball players to have been born at sea, along with Red Fisher. His birth certificate lists "At sea, on the Atlantic Ocean" as his birthplace. His parents were emigrating to the United States from Europe at the time.

Porray died at the age of 65 in Lackawaxen, Pennsylvania, and is interred at the Odd Fellows Cemetery in that town.
