= Fred Smith (infielder) =

American baseball player (1891–1961)

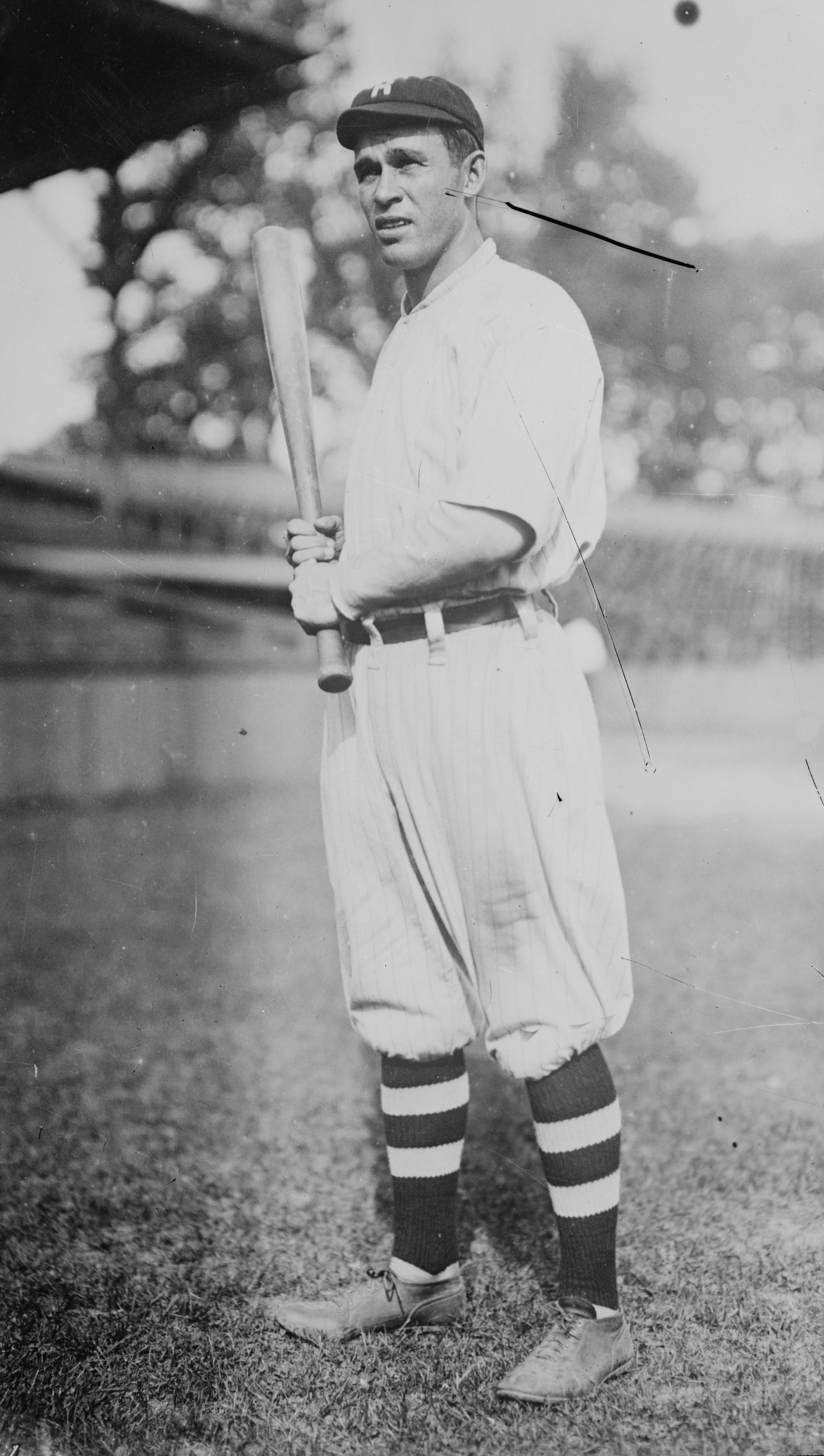
- Third baseman/Shortstop
- Born: July 29, 1891; Cleveland, Ohio, US
- Died: May 28, 1961 (aged 69); Cleveland, Ohio, US
- Batted: Right Threw: Right

MLB debut
- April 17, 1913, for the Boston Braves

Last MLB appearance
- September 30, 1917, for the St. Louis Cardinals

MLB statistics
- Batting average: .226
- Home runs: 8
- Runs batted in: 158
- Stats at Baseball Reference

Teams
- Boston Braves (1913); Buffalo Buffeds/Blues (1914–1915); Brooklyn Tip-Tops (1915); St. Louis Cardinals (1917)

Fred Vincent Smith (July 29, 1891 in Cleveland, Ohio – May 28, 1961 in Cleveland, Ohio) was an American infielder in Major League Baseball in the early 20th century. Smith played his first game on April 17, 1913, and played his final game on September 30, 1917. He was later the manager of the Hattiesburg, Mississippi based Hattiesburg Hubman minor league team during the 1923 season.

Smith's pro career began with three seasons for the minor league Peoria Distillers. His best season in the majors came in 1915, with 122 hits and a batting average of .244.

Fred's brother Charlie Smith was a pitcher for four MLB teams, winning 66 games.

== Sources ==
- Career statistics from Baseball Reference · Baseball Reference (Minors) · Retrosheet · Baseball Almanac, or Retrosheet
