= Joe Agler =

American baseball player (1887–1971)

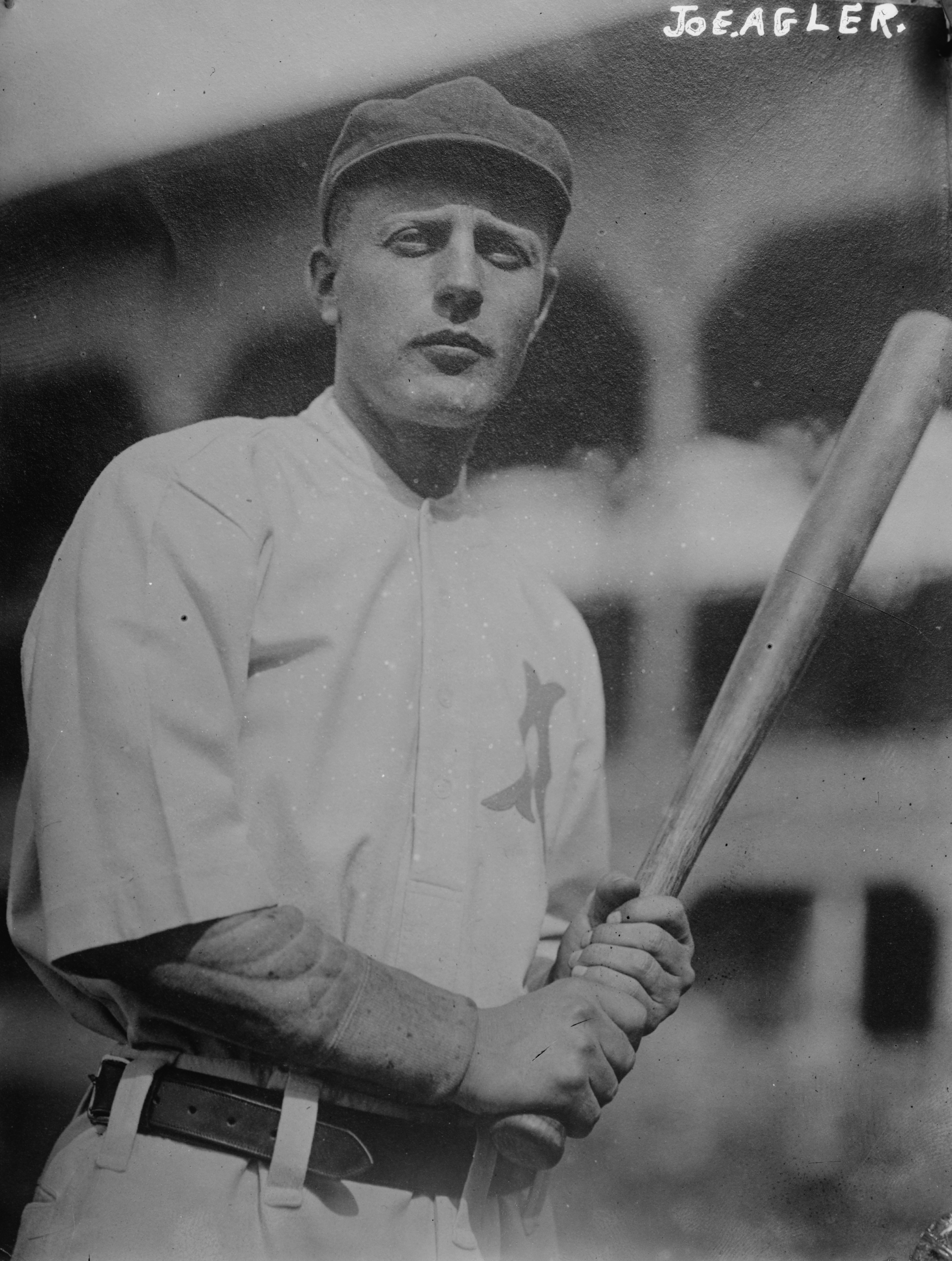
- Joe Agler with the Atlanta Crackers in 1912.
- First baseman / Outfielder
- Born: June 12, 1887; Coshocton, Ohio, U.S.
- Died: April 26, 1971 (aged 83); Massillon, Ohio, U.S.
- Batted: Left Threw: Left

MLB debut
- October 1, 1912, for the Washington Senators

Last MLB appearance
- September 30, 1915, for the Baltimore Terrapins

MLB statistics
- Batting average: .246
- Home runs: 0
- Runs batted in: 36
- Stats at Baseball Reference

Teams
- Washington Senators (1912); Buffalo Buffeds/Blues (1914–15); Baltimore Terrapins (1915)

Joseph Abram Agler (June 12, 1887 – April 26, 1971) was an American professional baseball player. He played all or part of three seasons in Major League Baseball between 1912 and 1915. He played mostly as a first baseman, but also played substantially in the outfield.

He made his major league debut for the Washington Senators at the end of the 1912 season. He returned to the majors with the Buffalo Buffeds in 1914, when he played in 135 games. He started the next season with Buffalo, but moved to the Baltimore Terrapins partway through the season. After the Federal League folded, Agler never returned to the majors.

== Sources ==
- Career statistics from Baseball Reference · Baseball Reference (Minors) · Retrosheet · Baseball Almanac
