= Nick Allen (catcher) =

American baseball player (1888–1939)

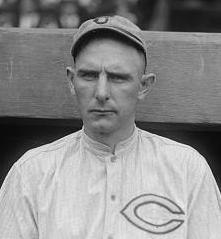
- Catcher
- Born: September 14, 1888; Norton, Kansas, U.S.
- Died: October 16, 1939 (aged 51); Hines, Illinois, U.S.
- Batted: Right Threw: Right

MLB debut
- May 1, 1914, for the Buffalo Buffeds

Last MLB appearance
- October 2, 1920, for the Cincinnati Reds

MLB statistics
- Batting average: .232
- On-base percentage: .288
- Runs batted in: 36
- Stats at Baseball Reference

Teams
- Buffalo Buffeds (1914–1915); Chicago Cubs (1916); Cincinnati Reds (1918–1920)

Artemus Ward "Nick" Allen (September 14, 1888 – October 16, 1939) was an American catcher in Major League Baseball. He played for the Buffalo Buffeds/Blues, Chicago Cubs, and Cincinnati Reds. Allen became a minor league baseball manager after his playing career was over and earned the nickname "Roarin' Nick" for his altercations with umpires. He stood at 6' 0" and weighed 180 lbs.

== Career ==
Allen was born in Norton, Kansas. He started his professional baseball career in 1910 in the Kansas State League. He batted .188 in 105 games that year and then moved on to the Illinois–Indiana–Iowa League, American Association, and Northern League, each for just one season.

In February 1914, Allen signed with the Federal League's Buffalo Buffeds. He made his major league debut on May 1, 1914 but various injuries shortened his rookie season. In 1915, he returned and played in an MLB career-high 84 games. He committed 21 errors and batted .205.

The Federal League folded after 1915, and Allen was sold to the Chicago Cubs. He played 5 games for Chicago, going 1 for 16 at the plate. He then returned to the minors for 1916 and 1917. The Cincinnati Reds bought his contract in 1917, and he was a backup catcher on the major league squad from 1918 to 1920. In 1919, he batted .320 (in 15 games), and the Reds won the National League pennant and World Series.

Allen was traded to the American Association's St. Paul Saints before the 1921 season. He batted .317 in 128 games during his first campaign in St. Paul. He then served as the team's manager from 1924 to 1928, winning one pennant. In mid-1929, he took over as manager for the Tulsa Oilers of the Western League and guided that team to a pennant, as well.

Allen was a manager and scout for various teams in the 1930s. Known as "Roarin' Nick" because of his "umpire baiting" on the field, Allen claimed that his actions were done solely to increase attendance at the ballpark.

Allen was hospitalized in February 1939 for cancer, and he died on October 16, 1939. He is buried at Ninnescah Cemetery in Udall, Kansas.
