= Dan Woodman =

American baseball player (1893-1962)

- Pitcher
- Born: July 8, 1893; Danvers, Massachusetts, U.S.
- Died: December 14, 1962 (aged 69); Danvers, Massachusetts, U.S.
- Batted: Right Threw: Right

MLB debut
- July 10, 1914, for the Buffalo Buffeds

Last MLB appearance
- May 12, 1915, for the Buffalo Blues

MLB statistics
- Win–loss record: 0–0
- Strikeouts: 14
- Earned run average: 2.94
- Stats at Baseball Reference

Teams
- Buffalo Buffeds/Blues (1914–1915)

Daniel Courtenay Woodman (July 8, 1893 – December 14, 1962) was an American professional baseball pitcher. He played parts of two seasons in Major League Baseball, 1914 and 1915, for the Buffalo Buffeds/Blues of the Federal League.
