= Tex McDonald =

American baseball player

- Right fielder
- Born: January 31, 1891; Farmersville, Texas, US
- Died: March 31, 1943 (aged 52); Houston, Texas, US
- Batted: Left Threw: Right

MLB debut
- April 11, 1912, for the Cincinnati Reds

Last MLB appearance
- August 14, 1915, for the Buffalo Blues

MLB statistics
- Batting average: .298
- Home runs: 13
- RBI: 135
- Stats at Baseball Reference

Teams
- Cincinnati Reds (1912–13); Boston Braves (1913); Pittsburgh Rebels (1914); Buffalo Buffeds/Blues (1914–15)

Charles C. "Tex" McDonald (born Charles C. Crabtree) was an American professional baseball player. He played in Major League Baseball from 1912 to 1915.

According to The Atlanta Constitution (Dick Jemison, 02/11/1916):

Years ago when McDonald or Crabtree was playing in the Texas tall grass, he is said to have carried the handle Crabtree. "Tex", it seems, occasionally, as all ball players will do, dropped a fly ball or something of that sort, and it always hurt him when he did. Accordingly, "Tex" would get a little huffy and sulk around. The result was instantaneous. Fandom decided that "Tex" wasn't really only Crabtree – they agreed he was a crab. When the fans started calling him "Crab", "Tex" resented it, and, though his contract was good for the remainder of the year, some claim he hopped it, landed in the Western League, where he adopted the name McDonald. He has worn it ever since.

McDonald broke into the majors with the Cincinnati Reds. During the 1913 season, he was traded to the Boston Braves for Johnny Kling. His batting average was .359 for Boston, in 145 at-bats.

The Federal League began play as a major league in 1914, and McDonald was one of the players who jumped over. His career ended when the league folded.
