= Al Schulz =

American baseball player (1889–1931)

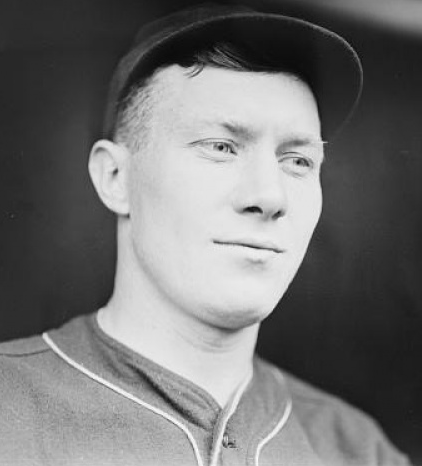
- Schulz in 1915
- Pitcher
- Born: May 12, 1889; Toledo, Ohio, U.S.
- Died: December 13, 1931 (aged 42); Gallipolis, Ohio, U.S.
- Batted: Right Threw: Left

MLB debut
- September 25, 1912, for the New York Highlanders

Last MLB appearance
- September 23, 1916, for the Cincinnati Reds

MLB statistics
- Win–loss record: 47–63
- Earned run average: 3.32
- Strikeouts: 445
- Stats at Baseball Reference

Teams
- New York Highlanders / Yankees (1912–1914); Buffalo Buffeds/Blues (1914–1915); Cincinnati Reds (1916)

Albert Christopher Schulz (May 12, 1889 – December 13, 1931) was an American professional baseball player who played pitcher in the Major Leagues from 1912-1916. He would play for the New York Yankees, Buffalo Buffeds, and Cincinnati Reds.

Shulz was primarily a starter, but would come out of the bullpen when needed. He made 110 starts and 50 relief appearances in his career, pitching in three leagues, the American League with the Yankees, the Federal League with Buffalo, and finish his career in the National League in a short stint with the Reds.

Shulz died on December 13, 1931, at the age of 42.
