= Gene Krapp =

American baseball player (1887–1923)

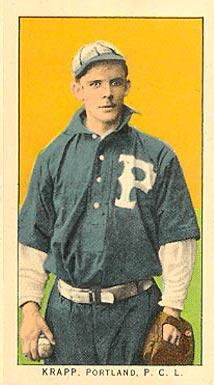
- Pitcher
- Born: May 12, 1887; Rochester, New York, U.S.
- Died: April 13, 1923 (aged 35); Detroit, Michigan, U.S.
- Batted: Right Threw: Right

MLB debut
- April 14, 1911, for the Cleveland Naps

Last MLB appearance
- September 30, 1915, for the Buffalo Blues

MLB statistics
- Win–loss record: 40–47
- Earned run average: 3.23
- Strikeouts: 353
- Stats at Baseball Reference

Teams
- Cleveland Naps (1911–1912); Buffalo Buffeds/Blues (1914–1915)

Eugene Hamlet Krapp (May 12, 1887 – April 13, 1923) was an American pitcher in Major League Baseball from 1911 to 1915. He played for the Cleveland Naps and Buffalo Buffeds/Blues. In a four season career where he pitched in 118 games, Krapp had a win–loss record of 40-47 and a 3.23 earned run average.

== Biography ==
Krapp was born in Rochester, New York, to Frederick “Fritz” and Bertha (Hettig) Krapp on May 12, 1887. Of German stock, both of his parents were from Wurtemberg, Germany. He started his professional baseball career in 1906, in the Southern Michigan League. In 1909, he led the league with 23 wins and then went to the Portland Beavers of the class A Pacific Coast League. Krapp had his greatest season in 1910. Nicknamed "Rubber Arm" for his durability, he pitched 442 innings and went 29–16, as Portland won the pennant. Krapp led the PCL with a 1.26 earned run average.

The following season, Krapp made his major league debut for the Cleveland Naps, a team which featured stars such as Shoeless Joe Jackson and Nap Lajoie. Krapp led the American League with 138 walks in 1911 but was also difficult to hit, and he went 13–9. However, he slumped badly in 1912.

Krapp returned to the Portland Beavers in 1913 before making his way to the Federal League. In 1914, he went 16–14 with a 2.49 ERA for Buffalo, setting his major league career-bests in innings pitched, wins, and ERA. He pitched one more season for Buffalo and then one in the minor leagues before retiring.

Krapp died in 1923.
