= Fred Anderson (baseball) =

American baseball player (1885–1957)

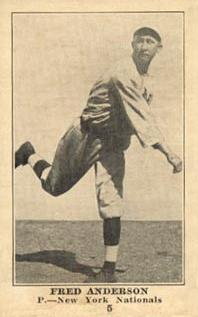
- Anderson in 1917
- Pitcher
- Born: December 11, 1885; Calahan, North Carolina, U.S.
- Died: November 8, 1957 (aged 71); Winston-Salem, North Carolina, U.S.
- Batted: Right Threw: Right

MLB debut
- September 25, 1909, for the Boston Red Sox

Last MLB appearance
- July 9, 1918, for the New York Giants

MLB statistics
- Win–loss record: 53–57
- Earned run average: 2.86
- Strikeouts: 514
- Stats at Baseball Reference

Teams
- Boston Red Sox (1909, 1913); Buffalo Buffeds/Blues (1914–1915); New York Giants (1916–1918)

Career highlights and awards
- NL ERA leader (1917)

John Frederick Anderson (December 11, 1885 – November 8, 1957) was an American baseball player. He played for Davidson College in 1906, but later transferred to the Maryland Agricultural College (later the University of Maryland), where he played from 1907 to 1909. Then, the 6 ft 2 in (1.88 m), 180-pound pitcher moved to play for the Boston Red Sox. Anderson played in Boston in 1909 but did not play major league baseball again for the Red Sox again until due to his practicing dentistry. In 1914, he jumped to the Federal League to play for Buffalo for the 1914 and 1915 seasons.

In 1916, he was sold to the New York Giants and Anderson played with them for three seasons. He pitched for the Giants in the 1917 World Series against the Chicago White Sox.

Anderson committed suicide on November 8, 1957, in his Winston-Salem, North Carolina home.

== See also ==
- List of Major League Baseball annual ERA leaders
- List of Major League Baseball annual saves leaders
