= Del Young (outfielder) =

American baseball player (1885–1959)

- Outfielder
- Born: October 24, 1885; Macon, Missouri, U.S.
- Died: December 17, 1959 (aged 74); Cleveland, Ohio, U.S.
- Batted: Left Threw: Right

MLB debut
- September 24, 1909, for the Cincinnati Reds

Last MLB appearance
- May 12, 1915, for the Buffalo Blues

MLB statistics
- Batting average: .265
- Home runs: 4
- Runs batted in: 23
- Stats at Baseball Reference

Teams
- Cincinnati Reds (1909); Buffalo Buffeds/Blues (1914–1915)

Delmer John Young (October 24, 1885 – December 17, 1959) was an American professional baseball player. He played all or part of three seasons in Major League Baseball, primarily as an outfielder. In 1909, he played for the Cincinnati Reds, and in 1914 and 1915 for the Buffalo Blues. During his playing career, he was measured at 5 foot 11, and batted left-handed and threw right-handed. He was born in Macon, Missouri on October 24, 1885. His son, Delmer Edward Young also played Major League Baseball.

In 94 career major league games, he had 52 hits, 4 home runs, 23 runs batted in, and 17 runs. He had a career batting average of .265.

Young died on December 17, 1959, in Cleveland, Ohio.
