= Tom Downey =

American baseball player (1884–1961)

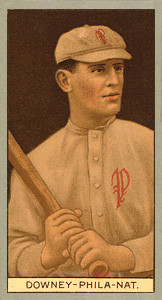
- Infielder
- Born: January 1, 1884; Lewiston, Maine, U.S.
- Died: August 3, 1961 (aged 77); Passaic, New Jersey, U.S.
- Batted: Right Threw: Right

MLB debut
- May 7, 1909, for the Cincinnati Reds

Last MLB appearance
- September 30, 1915, for the Buffalo Blues

MLB statistics
- Batting average: .240
- Home runs: 7
- Runs batted in: 188

Teams
- Cincinnati Reds (1909–1911); Philadelphia Phillies (1912); Chicago Cubs (1912); Buffalo Buffeds/Blues (1914–1915)

Thomas Edward Downey (January 1, 1884 – August 3, 1961) was an American Major League Baseball player.

Born in Lewiston, Maine, Downey played on several baseball teams after his first professional appearance at age 25 on May 7, 1909. Downey played for the Cincinnati Reds from 1909 until 1911, both the Philadelphia Phillies and the Chicago Cubs in 1912, and from 1914 to 1915, the Buffalo Buffeds/Blues. He both batted and threw the ball right-handed. His last game, ending a six-year Major League career, was on September 30, 1915. Downey, who was 5 feet 10 inches (178 cm) and weighed 178 pounds (81 kg), never had any higher education. He died in Passaic, New Jersey.
