= International Fair Association Grounds =

Fairgrounds and sports venue in Buffalo, New York

Coordinates: 42°55′1″N 78°50′55″W

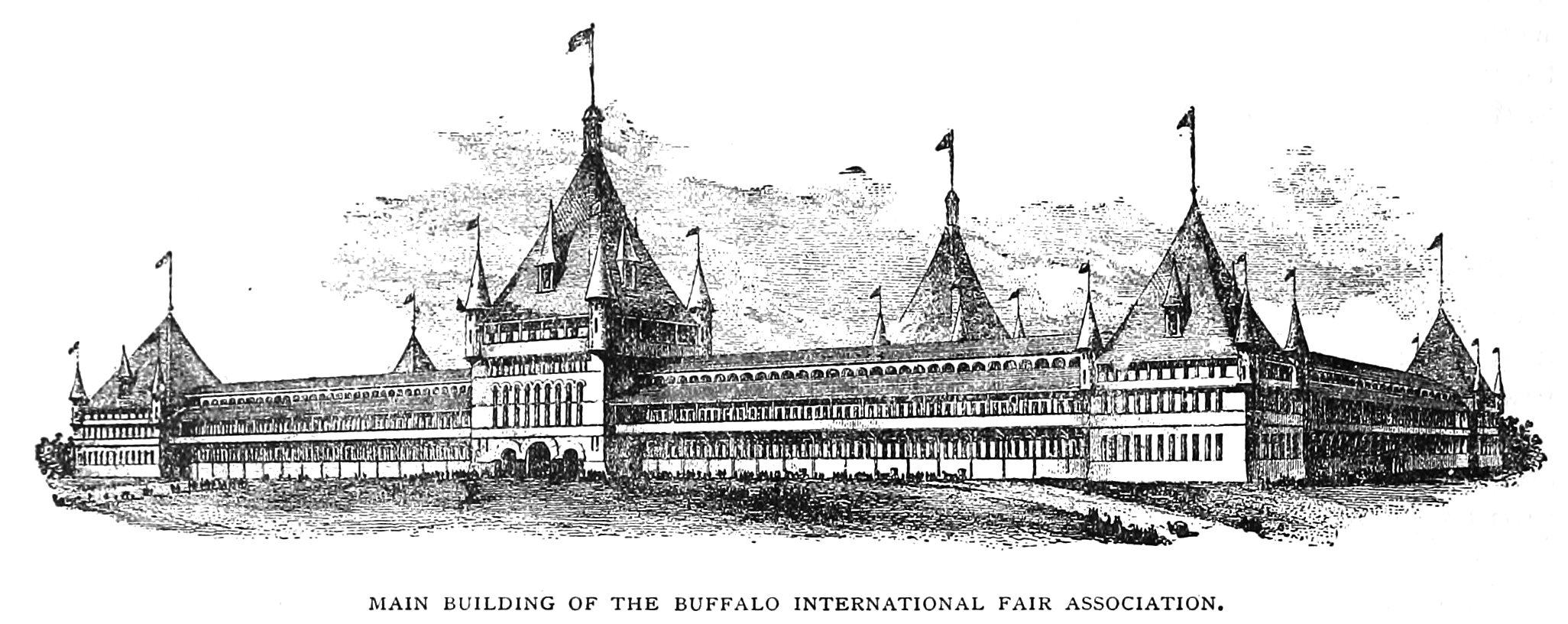
- Main building of the Buffalo International Fair Association (1888)
- Interactive map of International Fair Association Grounds
- Former names: Federal League Base Ball Park (1914-1915)
- Location: (N) Northland Ave, (W) Lonsdale Rd, (S) Boston Ave (later Hamlin Rd)
- Capacity: 20,000
- Field size: Left – 354 ft.; Center – 400 ft.; Right – 312 ft.

Construction
- Groundbreaking: March 23, 1914
- Opened: May 11, 1914
- Main contractors: Mosler & Summers

Tenant
- Buffalo Federals (FL) (1914–1915)

International Fair Association Grounds was a fairgrounds and later a short-lived baseball and football ground located in Buffalo, New York. The ballpark, built on a portion of the former fairgrounds, was home to the Buffalo Buffeds/Blues of the Federal League in 1914 and 1915.

The fairgrounds property was originally a large block bounded by Northland Avenue (north); Humboldt Parkway (east); Ferry Street (south); Dupont Street, and Jefferson Avenue (west). The grounds included a horserace track and grandstand, and a bicycle track within the horserace track. The grounds were a few blocks northwest of the Buffalo Baseball Park.

By the 1910s, the property had been sold to residential developers, and streets were being cut through to form the neighborhood that would become known as Hamlin Park.

The Buffeds sought property for a ballpark in 1914 and found a northwest corner of the property available. The team broke ground on March 23, 1914, with Mayor Louis P. Fuhrmann in attendance and constructed a concrete ballpark called Federal League Park in the spring of 1914. The stands and diamond overlapped part of the site of the northwest corner of the racetrack and its grandstand. The ballpark itself was located on a block bound by Northland Avenue (north, third base); Lonsdale Road (an extension of Hauf Street) (west, first base); Hamlin Road (an extension of Balcom Street) (south, right field); Oriole (now Donaldson Road) T'ing-into the property from the east, and Wohlers Avenue (east, left field).

In addition to baseball, the grounds hosted the 1914 New York Pro Football League championship, won by the Lancaster Malleables.

The area is now fully residential buildings. A short street just to the east of the area, which existed when the fairgrounds was there, is a silent reminder: Inter Park Avenue.
