= Walter Blair (baseball) =

American baseball player

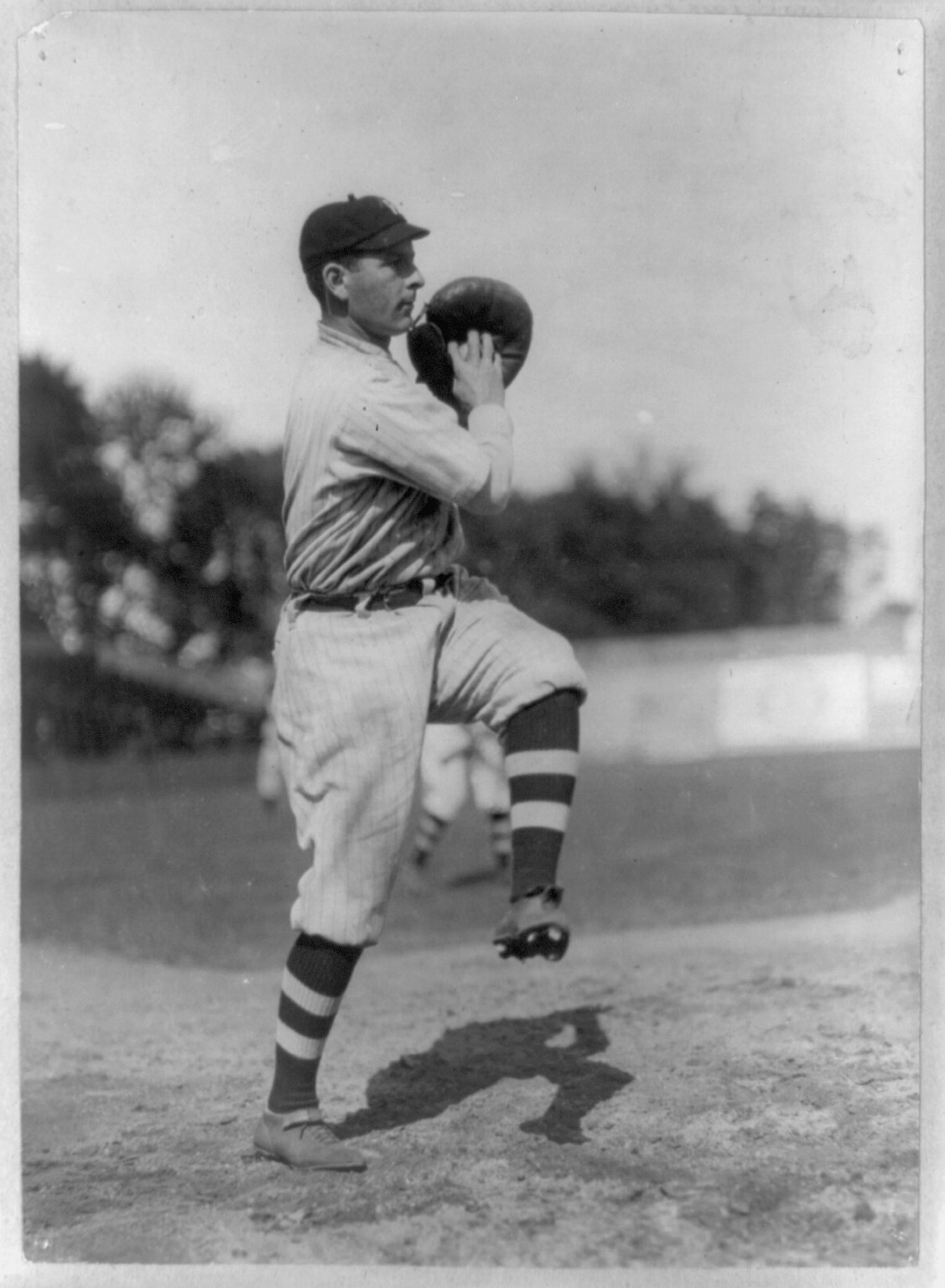
- Catcher
- Born: October 13, 1883; Landrus, Pennsylvania, U.S.
- Died: August 20, 1948 (aged 64); Lewisburg, Pennsylvania, U.S.
- Batted: Right Threw: Right

MLB debut
- September 17, 1907, for the New York Highlanders

Last MLB appearance
- September 29, 1915, for the Buffalo Blues

MLB statistics
- Batting average: .217
- Home runs: 3
- Runs batted in: 106
- Stats at Baseball Reference

Teams
- As player: New York Highlanders (1907–1911); Buffalo Blues (1914–1915); As manager: Buffalo Blues (1915)

Walter Allen Blair (October 13, 1883 – August 20, 1948), nicknamed "Heavy", was an American catcher in Major League Baseball player born in Landrus, Pennsylvania who, after attending Bucknell University, played as a backup catcher for the New York Highlanders from 1907 through 1911. He later got his chance to play regularly when played for the Buffalo Buffeds/Blues of the Federal League during their only two seasons in 1914 and 1915. It was for this team that he did appear as manager for two games, a doubleheader played on June 4, 1915, his team won one and lost one.

Following his playing career he served as a baseball coach at the University of Pittsburgh and Bucknell University. He was inducted into the Bucknell Hall of Fame in 1987.

Blair died after a heart attack while shaving in the bathroom of his Lewisburg, Pennsylvania home on August 20, 1948. He was buried in the family mausoleum at Lewisburg City Cemetery.

== See also ==
- List of Major League Baseball player–managers
