= Larry Schlafly =

American baseball player and manager (1878–1919)

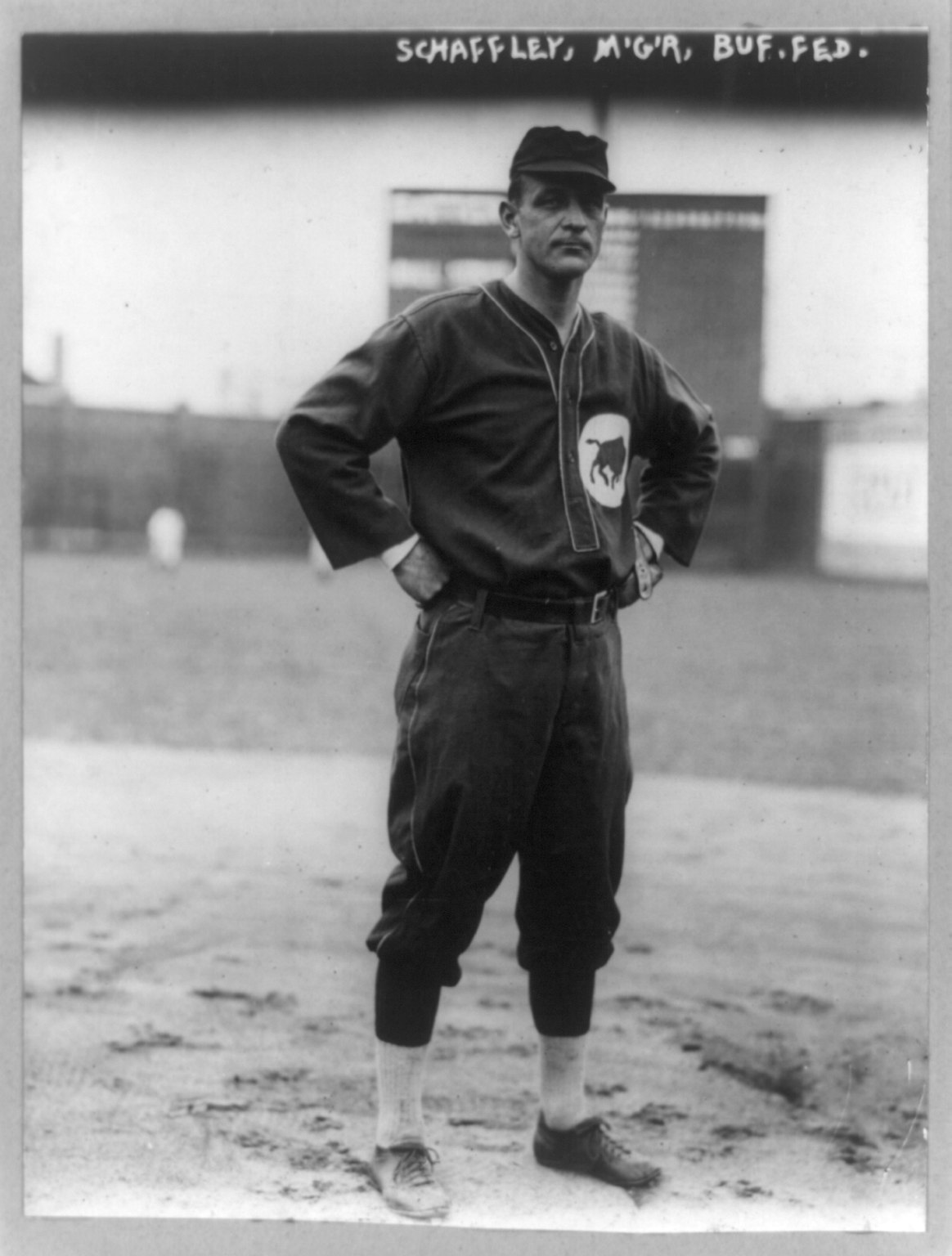
- Second baseman / Manager
- Born: September 19, 1878; Port Washington, Ohio, U.S.
- Died: June 27, 1919 (aged 40); Beach City, Ohio, U.S.
- Batted: Right Threw: Right

MLB debut
- September 18, 1902, for the Chicago Orphans

Last MLB appearance
- October 10, 1914, for the Buffalo Buffeds

MLB statistics
- Hits: 158
- RBIs: 58
- Batting average: .240
- Stats at Baseball Reference

Teams
- As player: Chicago Orphans (1902); Washington Senators (1906–1907); Buffalo Buffeds (1914); As manager: Buffalo Buffeds/Blues (1914–1915)

Harry Fenton "Larry" Schlafly (September 19, 1878 – June 27, 1919) was an American Major League Baseball player and manager born in Port Washington, Ohio. Larry entered the majors with a brief stint with the Chicago Orphans in 1902. He didn't play in the majors again until 1906 when he played for the Washington Senators. Statistically, it was his best season of his career, playing in 123 games, hit .246, and stole 29 bases. After playing sparingly for the Senators in 1907, he again disappeared from the majors until emerging as the player-manager for the Buffalo Buffeds of the Federal League in 1914. He would stay on the next season as the manager only.

He died from spinal meningitis in Beach City, Ohio on June 27, 1919.

== See also ==
- List of Major League Baseball player–managers
