= Buffalo Blues =

Baseball club

Information
- Location: Buffalo, New York
- Founded: 1914
- Disbanded: 1915
- League championships: 0
- Former name: Buffalo Blues (1915); Buffalo Buffeds (1914)
- Former league: Federal League
- Former ballpark: Federal League Park
- Ownership: Walter Mullen; Laurens Enos; Oliver Cabana Jr. William E. Robertson
- Manager: Larry Schlafly; Walter Blair; Harry Lord

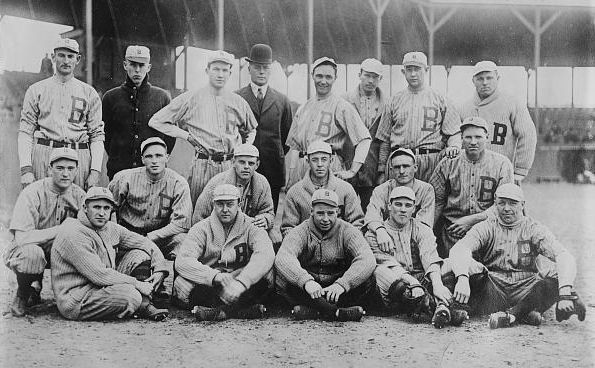
Buffalo Blues, baseball team 1915

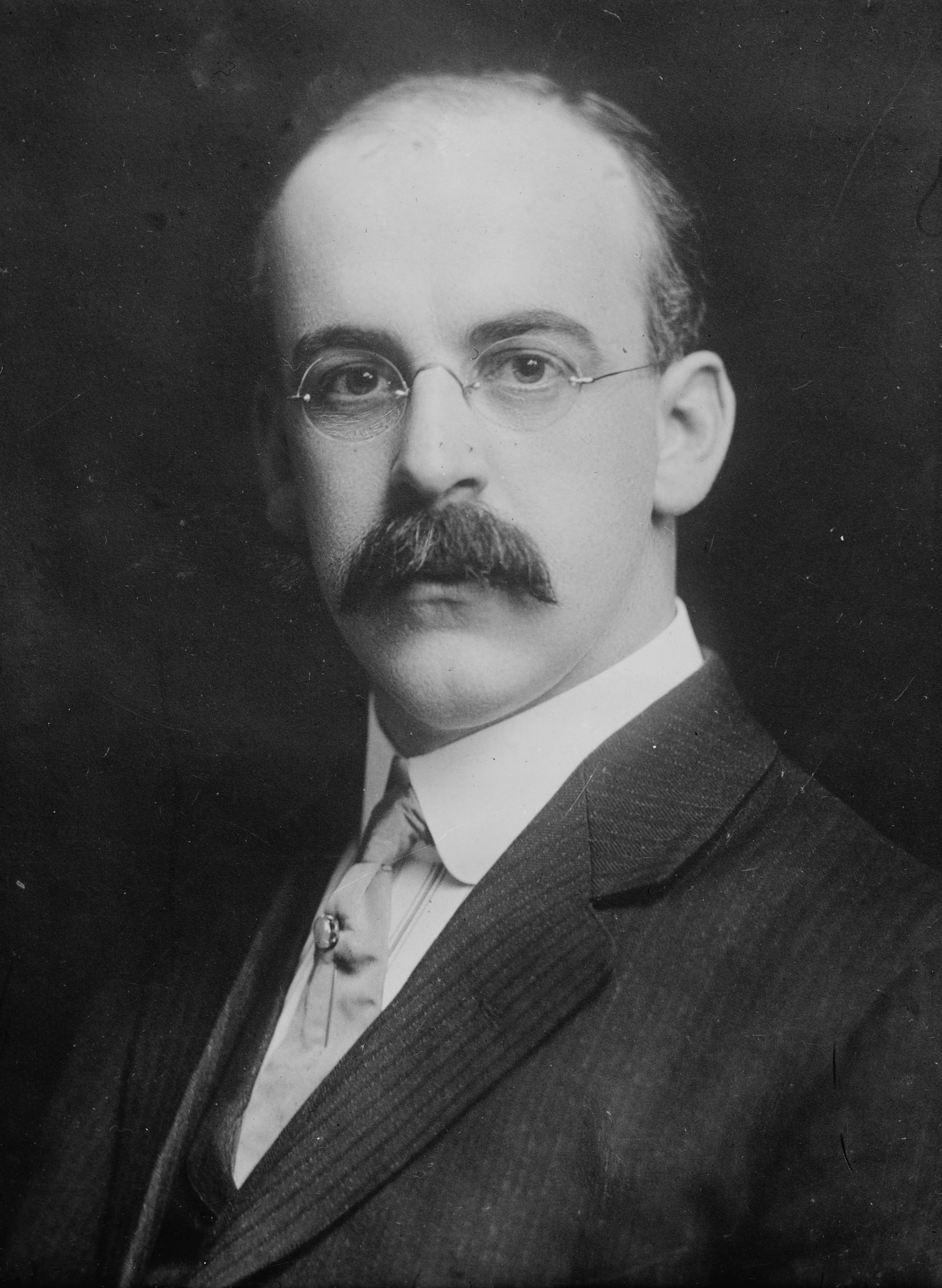
William E. Robertson was president of the Buffalo, New York Federal League baseball team

The Buffalo Blues were a professional baseball club that played in the short-lived Federal League, which was a minor league in 1913 and a full-fledged outlaw major league the next two years. It was the last major league baseball team to be based in the city of Buffalo. In 1913 and 1914, as was the standard for Federal League teams, the franchise did not have an official name, instead going by the generic BufFeds.

The Buffalo team played at International Fair Association Grounds. Due to delays in construction of their new ballpark, the team did not play their first home game until a month after the Federal League season had started. Buffalo sold shares of stock of the team to the public through a series of newspaper ads. Preferred shares were sold for $10 each.

In the 1914 season, the team posted an 80–71 record (.530) and finished in fourth place, seven games behind the league champion Indianapolis Hoosiers. In the league's second and final season, the team, then known as the Buffalo Blues, ended in sixth place with a 74–78 mark (.487), 12 games behind the Chicago Whales.

An unusual player who played for the Blues in 1914 was Ed Porray; the only major leaguer whose birthplace is not a place, but rather noted as "on a ship somewhere in the Atlantic Ocean," on December 5, 1888.

Between the Buffalo players who had experience in the American and/or National leagues were Hugh Bedient, Walter Blair, Hal Chase, Tom Downey, Howard Ehmke, Ed Lafitte, Harry Lord and Russ Ford.

== Baseball in Buffalo ==
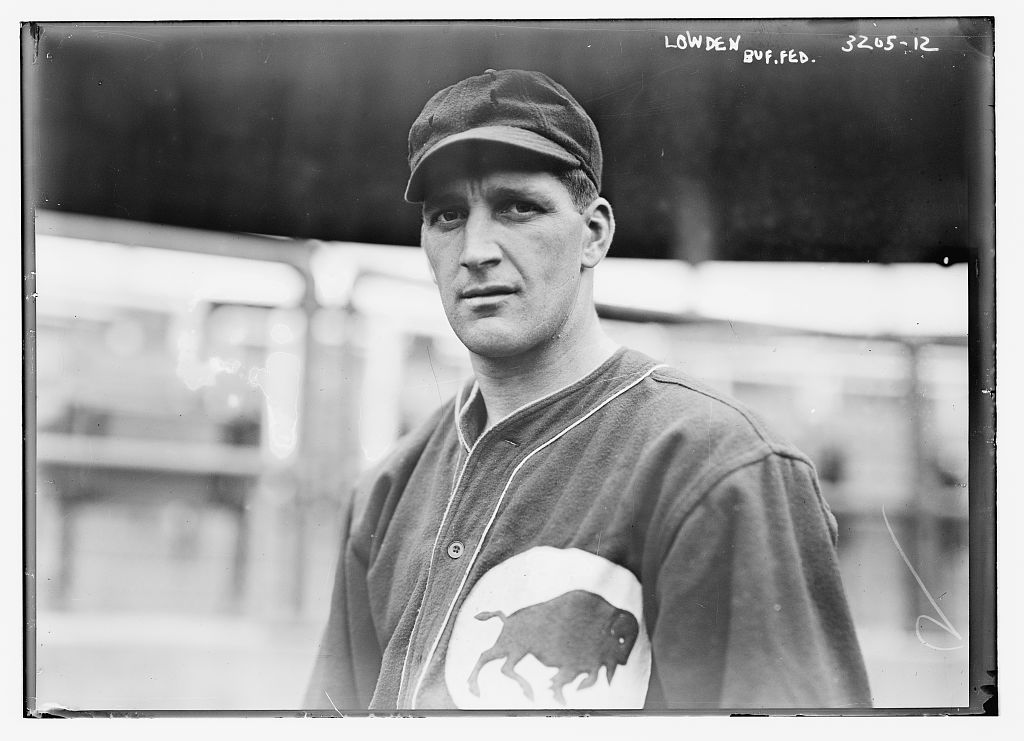
Baldy Louden, in the uniform of the Buffalo Buffeds of the Federal League of Major League Baseball, 1914.

Buffalo has had three attempts at major league baseball. Prior to the Buffeds, were the Buffalo Bisons, from which the current minor league team derives its name and history. They entered the NL in 1879 and came in third place only 10 games out from first place. They had two notable players; Hall of Famers Pud Galvin and Dan Brouthers. The Bisons team was dropped from the NL in 1885. In 1890, another Buffalo baseball team emerged coincidentally called the Bisons. This team, a member of the upstart Players' League, has notably one of the worst season records to date. The Buffalo Blues were the last of the three major league teams Buffalo had between 1879 and 1915. A proposed Continental League team (to be owned by future Buffalo Sabres owner Robert O. Swados) was slated for Buffalo in 1961, but the league folded before playing any games.

The closest that any major league baseball team has come to Buffalo since then is Toronto (70 miles (110 km) away as the crow flies), where the Toronto Blue Jays have played since 1977. Due to border travel restrictions stemming from the COVID-19 pandemic, the Blue Jays played their home games at Buffalo's Sahlen Field (a facility designed to be easily upgraded to MLB standards) for the 2020 and part of the 2021 Major League Baseball season, marking the first major league games played in Buffalo in 104 years.

== See also ==
- 1914 Buffalo Buffeds season
- 1915 Buffalo Blues season
- Buffalo Blues all-time roster
