= Baltimore Terrapins all-time roster =

List of baseball players

The Baltimore Terrapins were a professional baseball team based in Baltimore, Maryland, that played in the Federal League for two seasons in 1914 and 1915. The franchise used Terrapin Park as their home field. In 1914, the team finished third in the FL with a record of 84–70. In 1915, the team finished eighth with a record of 47–107.

== Players ==
Key to symbols in player table
§	Player was a player-manager
†	Inducted into the National Baseball Hall of Fame and Museum

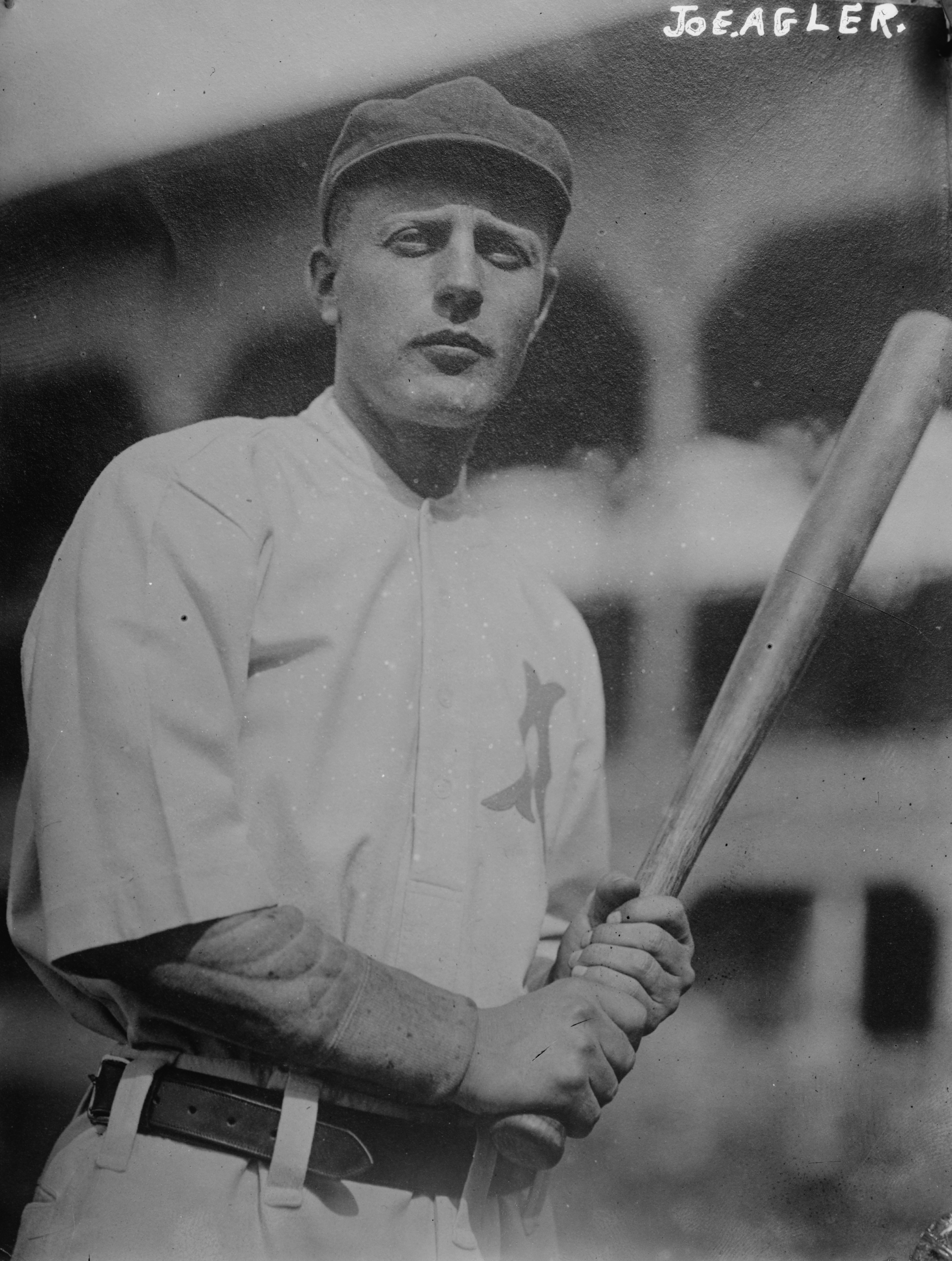
First baseman Joe Agler

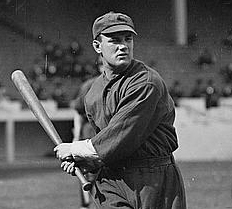
Center fielder Johnny Bates

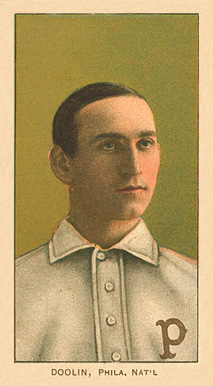
Shortstop Mickey Doolin

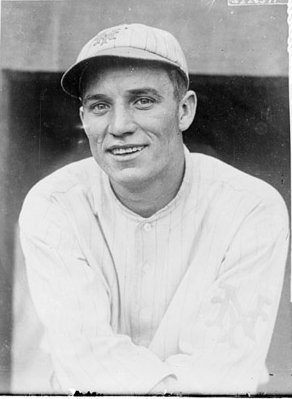
Shortstop Jimmy Smith

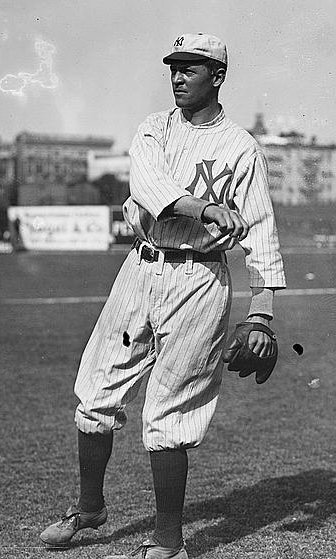
Left fielder Guy Zinn

Players who played for the Baltimore Terrapins, primary position played, and season(s) played for franchise
Player	Position(s)	Season(s)	Notes	Ref
Joe Agler	First baseman	1915		
John Allen	Pitcher	1914		
Bill Bailey	Pitcher	1914–1915		
Johnny Bates	Center fielder	1914		
Chief Bender^{†}	Pitcher	1915	Bender, who won four games for the Terrapins in 1915, was eventually elected into the Baseball Hall of Fame.	
Dave Black	Pitcher	1915		
Medric Boucher	Catcher	1914		
Felix Chouinard	Left fielder / Center fielder	1914		
Snipe Conley	Pitcher	1914–1915		
Ken Crawford	First baseman	1915		
Mickey Doolin	Shortstop	1914–1915		
Larry Douglas	Pitcher	1915		
Vern Duncan	Center fielder	1914–1915		
Charlie Eakle	Second baseman	1915		
Steve Evans	Right fielder	1915		
Ed Forsyth	Third baseman	1915		
John Gallagher	Second baseman	1915		
Jim Hickman	Center fielder	1915		
Vern Hughes	Pitcher	1914		
Fred Jacklitsch	Catcher	1914–1915		
Rankin Johnson	Pitcher	1915		
Doc Kerr	Catcher	1914–1915		
Enos Kirkpatrick	Third baseman	1914–1915		
Otto Knabe^{§}	Second baseman	1914–1915	Knabe was the team's second baseman and manager in 1914 and 1915.	
Karl Kolseth	First baseman	1915		
Fred Kommers	Left fielder	1914		
George LeClair	Pitcher	1915		
Frank Lobert	Third baseman	1914		
Charlie Maisel	Catcher	1915		
Jack McCandless	Center fielder	1914–1915		
Benny Meyer	Right fielder	1914–1915		
Charlie Miller	Pinch hitter	1915		
Yip Owens	Catcher	1915		
Jack Quinn	Pitcher	1914–1915	Quinn, who led the Terrapins in strikeouts in both 1914 and 1915, played in the majors from 1909 to 1933.	
Wally Reinecker	Third baseman	1915		
Jack Ridgway	Pitcher	1914		
Harvey Russell	Catcher	1914–1915		
Hack Simmons	Left fielder	1914–1915		
Frank Smith	Pitcher	1914–1915		
Jimmy Smith	Shortstop	1915		
George Suggs	Pitcher	1914–1915		
Harry Swacina	First baseman	1914–1915		
Tommy Vereker	Pitcher	1915		
Jimmy Walsh	Third baseman	1914–1915	Walsh led the Terrapins in home runs in both 1914 and 1915.	
Kaiser Wilhelm	Pitcher	1914–1915		
Charlie Young	Pitcher	1915		
Ducky Yount	Pitcher	1914		
Guy Zinn	Left fielder	1914–1915		
