= 1915 Baltimore Terrapins season =

1915 Baltimore Terrapins
- League: Federal League
- Ballpark: Terrapin Park
- City: Baltimore, Maryland
- Record: 47–107 (.305)
- League place: 8th
- Owners: Ned Hanlon
- Managers: Otto Knabe

The 1915 Baltimore Terrapins season was a season in American baseball. The Terrapins finished in 8th place in the Federal League, 40 games behind the Chicago Whales. After the season, both the team and the league folded.

== Regular season ==
=== Season standings ===
Federal League
Team	W	L	Pct.	GB	Home	Road
Chicago Whales	86	66	.566	—	44‍–‍32	42‍–‍34
St. Louis Terriers	87	67	.565	—	43‍–‍34	44‍–‍33
Pittsburgh Rebels	86	67	.562	½	45‍–‍31	41‍–‍36
Kansas City Packers	81	72	.529	5½	46‍–‍31	35‍–‍41
Newark Peppers	80	72	.526	6	40‍–‍39	40‍–‍33
Buffalo Blues	74	78	.487	12	37‍–‍40	37‍–‍38
Brooklyn Tip-Tops	70	82	.461	16	34‍–‍40	36‍–‍42
Baltimore Terrapins	47	107	.305	40	24‍–‍51	23‍–‍56

=== Record vs. opponents ===
1915 Federal League record Sources:
Team	BAL	BKF	BUF	CWH	KC	NWK	PRB	SLT
Baltimore	—	7–15	8–14	9–13	4–18	6–16	5–17	8–14
Brooklyn	15–7	—	9–11	7–15	11–11	12–10	9–13	7–15–1
Buffalo	14–8	11–9	—	8–14	11–11	11–11	9–13	10–12–1
Chicago	13–9	15–7	14–8	—	11–11	10–10–1	12–10–1	11–11–1
Kansas City	18–4	11–11	11–11	11–11	—	11–11	8–13	11–11
Newark	16–6	10–12	11–11	10–10–1	11–11	—	12–10–1	10–12–1
Pittsburgh	17–5	13–9	13–9	10–12–1	13–8	10–12–1	—	10–12–1
St. Louis	14–8	15–7–1	12–10–1	11–11–1	11–11	12–10–1	12–10–1	—

=== Roster ===
1915 Baltimore Terrapins
Roster
Pitchers: Bill Bailey; Chief Bender; Dave Black; Snipe Conley; Larry Douglas; Rankin Johnson; George LeClair; Jack Quinn; Frank Smith; George Suggs; Tommy Vereker; Kaiser Wilhelm; Charlie Young	Catchers: Fred Jacklitsch; Doc Kerr; Charlie Maisel; Yip Owens; Harvey Russell; Infielders: Joe Agler; Ken Crawford; Mickey Doolan; Charlie Eakle; Ed Forsythe; John Gallagher; Enos Kirkpatrick; Otto Knabe; Karl Kolseth; Wally Reinecker; Hack Simmons; Jimmy Smith; Harry Swacina; Jimmy Walsh	Outfielders: Vern Duncan; Steve Evans; Jim Hickman; Jack McCandless; Benny Meyer; Guy Zinn; Other batters: Charlie Miller	Manager: Otto Knabe

== Player stats ==
=== Batting ===
==== Starters by position ====
Note: Pos = Position; G = Games played; AB = At bats; H = Hits; Avg. = Batting average; HR = Home runs; RBI = Runs batted in

Pos	Player	G	AB	H	Avg.	HR	RBI
C	Yip Owens	99	334	84	.251	3	28
1B	Harry Swacina	85	301	74	.246	1	38
2B	Otto Knabe	103	320	81	.253	1	25
SS	Mickey Doolin	119	404	75	.186	2	21
3B	Jimmy Walsh	106	401	121	.302	9	60
OF	Steve Evans	88	340	107	.315	1	37
OF	Vern Duncan	146	531	142	.267	2	43
OF	Jack McCandless	117	406	87	.214	5	34

==== Other batters ====
Note: G = Games played; AB = At bats; H = Hits; Avg. = Batting average; HR = Home runs; RBI = Runs batted in

Player	G	AB	H	Avg.	HR	RBI
Guy Zinn	102	312	84	.269	5	43
Joe Agler	72	214	46	.215	0	14
Enos Kirkpatrick	68	171	41	.240	0	19
Fred Jacklitsch	49	135	32	.237	2	13
John Gallagher	40	126	25	.198	0	4
Benny Meyer	35	120	29	.242	0	5
Jimmy Smith	33	108	19	.176	1	11
Hack Simmons	39	88	18	.205	1	14
Ken Crawford	23	82	20	.244	0	7
Jim Hickman	20	81	17	.210	1	7
Harvey Russell	53	73	19	.260	0	11
Karl Kolseth	6	23	6	.261	0	1
Wally Reinecker	3	8	1	.125	0	0
Charlie Eakle	2	7	2	.286	0	0
Doc Kerr	3	6	2	.333	0	0
Charlie Maisel	1	4	0	.000	0	0
Ed Forsyth	1	3	0	.000	0	0
Charlie Miller	1	1	0	.000	0	0

=== Pitching ===
==== Starting pitchers ====
Note: G = Games pitched; IP = Innings pitched; W = Wins; L = Losses; ERA = Earned run average; SO = Strikeouts

Player	G	IP	W	L	ERA	SO
Jack Quinn	44	273.2	9	22	3.45	118
George Suggs	35	232.2	11	17	4.14	71
Chief Bender	26	178.1	4	16	3.89	99
Rankin Johnson	23	150.2	7	11	3.35	62

==== Other pitchers ====
Note: G = Games pitched; IP = Innings pitched; W = Wins; L = Losses; ERA = Earned run average; SO = Strikeouts

Player	G	IP	W	L	ERA	SO
Bill Bailey	36	190.1	6	19	4.63	98
Frank Smith	17	88.2	4	4	4.67	37
Snipe Conley	25	86.0	1	4	4.29	40
George LeClair	18	84.0	1	8	2.46	30
Charlie Young	9	35.0	2	3	5.91	13
Dave Black	8	34.0	1	3	3.71	10

==== Relief pitchers ====
Note: G = Games pitched; W = Wins; L = Losses; SV = Saves; ERA = Earned run average; SO = Strikeouts

Player	G	W	L	SV	ERA	SO
Tommy Vereker	2	0	0	0	15.00	1
Larry Douglas	2	1	0	0	3.00	1
Kaiser Wilhelm	1	0	0	0	0.00	0
