= 1914 Baltimore Terrapins season =

1914 Baltimore Terrapins
- League: Federal League
- Ballpark: Terrapin Park
- City: Baltimore, Maryland
- Record: 84–70 (.545)
- League place: 3rd
- Owners: Ned Hanlon
- Managers: Otto Knabe

The 1914 Baltimore Terrapins season was a season in American baseball. They finished in third place in the Federal League, 4½ games behind the Indianapolis Hoosiers.

== Offseason ==
- Prior to 1914 season
  - Vern Duncan jumped to the Terrapins from the Philadelphia Phillies.
  - Guy Zinn jumped to the Terrapins from the Boston Braves.

== Regular season ==
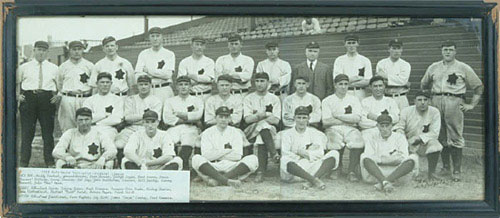
The 1914 Baltimore Terrapins

=== Season standings ===
Federal League
Team	W	L	Pct.	GB	Home	Road
Indianapolis Hoosiers	88	65	.575	—	53‍–‍23	35‍–‍42
Chicago Federals	87	67	.565	1½	43‍–‍34	44‍–‍33
Baltimore Terrapins	84	70	.545	4½	53‍–‍26	31‍–‍44
Buffalo Buffeds	80	71	.530	7	47‍–‍29	33‍–‍42
Brooklyn Tip-Tops	77	77	.500	11½	47‍–‍32	30‍–‍45
Kansas City Packers	67	84	.444	20	37‍–‍36	30‍–‍48
Pittsburgh Rebels	64	86	.427	22½	37‍–‍37	27‍–‍49
St. Louis Terriers	62	89	.411	25	32‍–‍43	30‍–‍46

=== Record vs. opponents ===
1914 Federal League record Sources:
Team	BAL	BKF	BUF	CWH	IND	KC	PRB	SLT
Baltimore	—	9–13	14–8–1	12–10	10–12–1	12–10	10–12–2	17–5–1
Brooklyn	13–9	—	11–11–1	9–13	3–19	11–11–1	17–5–1	13–9
Buffalo	8–14–1	11–11–1	—	10–12–1	11–10	12–10–1	13–7	15–7
Chicago	10–12	13–9	12–10–1	—	13–9–1	14–8	12–10	13–9–1
Indianapolis	12–10–2	19–3	10–11	9–13–1	—	13–9–1	12–10	13–9
Kansas City	10–12	11–11	10–12–1	8–14	9–13–1	—	11–10	8–12
Pittsburgh	12–10–2	5–17	7–13–1	10–12	10–12	10–11	—	10–11–1
St. Louis	5–17–1	9–13	7–15	9–13–1	9–13	12–8	11–10	—

=== Roster ===
1914 Baltimore Terrapins
Roster
Pitchers: John Allen; Bill Bailey; Snipe Conley; Vern Hughes; Jack Quinn; Jack Ridgway; Frank Smith; George Suggs; Kaiser Wilhelm; Ducky Yount	Catchers: Medric Boucher; Fred Jacklitsch; Doc Kerr; Harvey Russell; Infielders: Mickey Doolan; Enos Kirkpatrick; Otto Knabe; Frank Lobert; Harry Swacina; Jimmy Walsh	Outfielders: Johnny Bates; Felix Chouinard; Vern Duncan; Fred Kommers; Jack McCandless; Benny Meyer; Hack Simmons; Guy Zinn	Manager: Otto Knabe

== Player stats ==
=== Batting ===
==== Starters by position ====
Note: Pos = Position; G = Games played; AB = At bats; H = Hits; Avg. = Batting average; HR = Home runs; RBI = Runs batted in

Pos	Player	G	AB	H	Avg.	HR	RBI
C	Fred Jacklitsch	122	337	93	.276	2	48
1B	Harry Swacina	158	617	173	.280	0	90
2B	Otto Knabe	147	469	106	.226	2	42
SS	Mickey Doolin	145	486	119	.245	1	53
3B	Jimmy Walsh	120	428	132	.308	10	65
OF	Vern Duncan	157	557	160	.287	2	53
OF	Hack Simmons	114	352	95	.270	1	38
OF	Benny Meyer	143	500	152	.304	5	40

==== Other batters ====
Note: G = Games played; AB = At bats; H = Hits; Avg. = Batting average; HR = Home runs; RBI = Runs batted in

Player	G	AB	H	Avg.	HR	RBI
Guy Zinn	61	225	63	.280	3	25
Johnny Bates	59	190	58	.305	1	29
Enos Kirkpatrick	55	174	44	.253	2	16
Harvey Russell	81	168	39	.232	0	13
Fred Kommers	16	42	9	.214	1	1
Doc Kerr	14	34	9	.265	0	1
Jack McCandless	11	31	8	.258	0	1
Frank Lobert	11	30	6	.200	0	2
Medric Boucher	16	16	5	.313	0	2
Felix Chouinard	5	9	4	.444	0	1

=== Pitching ===
==== Starting pitchers ====
Note: G = Games pitched; IP = Innings pitched; W = Wins; L = Losses; ERA = Earned run average; SO = Strikeouts

Player	G	IP	W	L	ERA	SO
Jack Quinn	46	342.2	26	14	2.60	164
George Suggs	46	319.1	24	14	2.90	132
Bill Bailey	19	128.2	7	9	3.08	131

==== Other pitchers ====
Note: G = Games pitched; IP = Innings pitched; W = Wins; L = Losses; ERA = Earned run average; SO = Strikeouts

Player	G	IP	W	L	ERA	SO
Kaiser Wilhelm	47	243.2	12	17	4.03	113
Frank Smith	39	174.2	10	8	2.99	83
Snipe Conley	35	125.0	4	6	2.52	86
Jack Ridgway	4	9.0	0	1	11.00	2

==== Relief pitchers ====
Note: G = Games pitched; W = Wins; L = Losses; SV = Saves; ERA = Earned run average; SO = Strikeouts

Player	G	W	L	SV	ERA	SO
Ducky Yount	13	1	1	0	4.14	19
Vern Hughes	3	0	0	0	3.18	0
John Allen	1	0	0	0	18.00	2
