= 1892 in baseball =

The following are the baseball events of the year 1892 throughout the world.

== Champions ==
- National League (split season):
  - First-half: Boston Beaneaters
  - Second-half: Cleveland Spiders
  - World Series: Boston Beaneaters over Cleveland Spiders (5–0; 1 tie)

National League
Stat	Player	Total
AVG	Honus Wagner (PIT)	.381
HR	Herman Long (BSN)	12
RBI	Elmer Flick (PHI)	110
W	Joe McGinnity (BRO)	28
ERA	Rube Waddell (PIT)	2.37
K	Noodles Hahn (CIN)	132

== National League final standings ==
The National League played a split season schedule, with the teams that had the best record in each half of the season meeting in a postseason best-of-nine series, known at the time as the "World's Championship Series".

Locations of teams for the 1892 National League season
National League

National League
Team	W	L	Pct.	GB	Home	Road
Boston Beaneaters	102	48	.680	—	54‍–‍21	48‍–‍27
Cleveland Spiders	93	56	.624	8½	54‍–‍24	39‍–‍32
Brooklyn Grooms	95	59	.617	9	51‍–‍24	44‍–‍35
Philadelphia Phillies	87	66	.569	16½	55‍–‍26	32‍–‍40
Cincinnati Reds	82	68	.547	20	45‍–‍32	37‍–‍36
Pittsburgh Pirates	80	73	.523	23½	54‍–‍34	26‍–‍39
Chicago Colts	70	76	.479	30	36‍–‍31	34‍–‍45
New York Giants	71	80	.470	31½	42‍–‍36	29‍–‍44
Louisville Colonels	63	89	.414	40	37‍–‍31	26‍–‍58
Washington Senators	58	93	.384	44½	34‍–‍36	24‍–‍57
St. Louis Browns	56	94	.373	46	37‍–‍36	19‍–‍58
Baltimore Orioles	46	101	.313	54½	29‍–‍44	17‍–‍57

National League First-half standings	W	L	Pct.	GB
Boston Beaneaters	52	22	.703	—
Brooklyn Grooms	51	26	.662	2½
Philadelphia Phillies	46	30	.605	7
Cincinnati Reds	44	31	.587	8½
Cleveland Spiders	40	33	.548	11½
Pittsburgh Pirates	37	39	.487	16
Washington Senators	35	41	.461	18
Chicago Colts	31	39	.443	19
St. Louis Browns	31	42	.425	20½
New York Giants	31	43	.419	21
Louisville Colonels	30	47	.390	23½
Baltimore Orioles	20	55	.267	32½

National League Second-half standings	W	L	Pct.	GB
Cleveland Spiders	53	23	.697	—
Boston Beaneaters	50	26	.658	3
Brooklyn Grooms	44	33	.571	9½
Pittsburgh Pirates	43	34	.558	10½
Philadelphia Phillies	41	36	.532	12½
New York Giants	40	37	.519	13½
Chicago Colts	39	37	.513	14
Cincinnati Reds	38	37	.507	14½
Louisville Colonels	33	42	.440	19½
Baltimore Orioles	26	46	.361	25
St. Louis Browns	25	52	.325	28½
Washington Senators	23	52	.307	29½

== Events ==
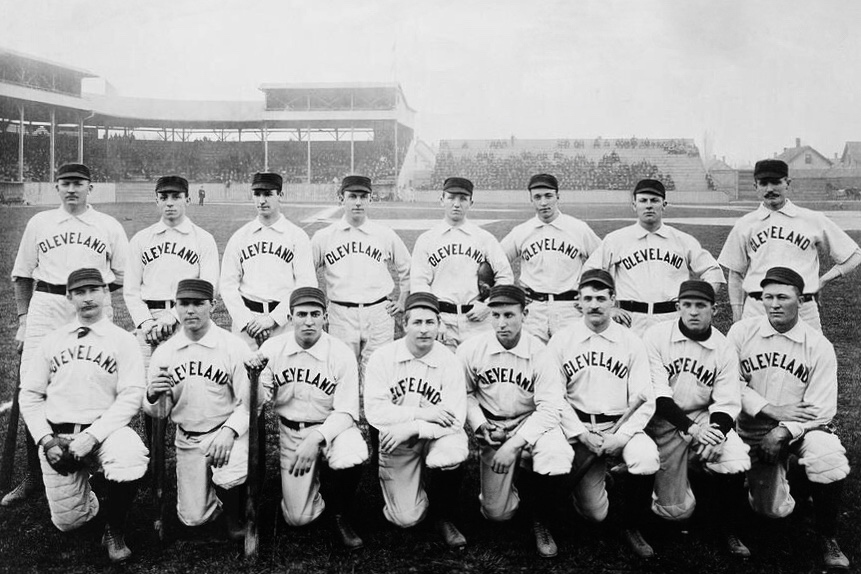
1892 Cleveland Spiders team photo

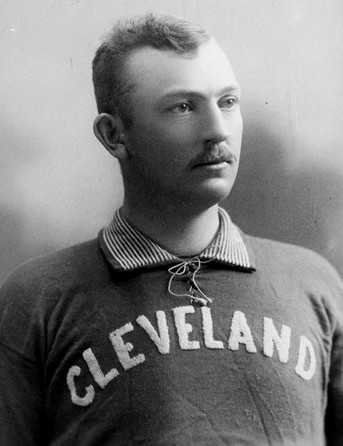
ERA leader Cy Young

- March 4 – Following the collapse of the American Association, the National League holds its first meeting. They decide on a split season for 1892, with the winners from each half to meet in a championship series following the regular season.
- June 6 – Benjamin Harrison becomes the first U.S. president to attend a game while in office, when he watches the Cincinnati Reds defeat the Washington Senators, 7–4 in 11 innings.
- July 13 – The final games of the first half are played.
- July 15 – Play resumes for the second half of the season after a one-day break.

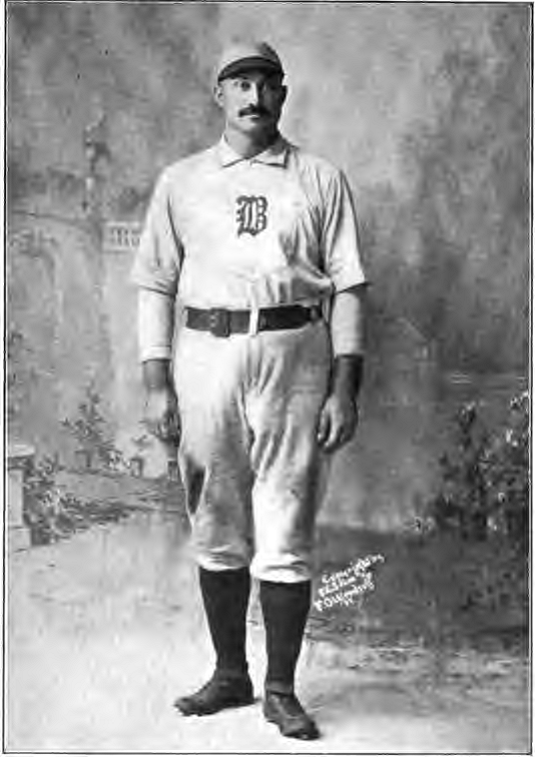
Jack Stivetts

- July/August – After the Boston Beaneaters cut some players, they begin the second half slowly and the Cleveland Spiders take the lead. Some fans accuse the Boston club of purposely playing poorly "in order to force a playoff at the end of the season"—that is, to generate extra revenue.
- August 6 – Jack Stivetts throws a no-hitter for the Boston Beaneaters in an 11–0 victory over the Brooklyn Grooms.
- August 22 – Louisville Colonels pitcher Ben Sanders hurls a no-hitter in a 6–2 win over the Baltimore Orioles.
- September 21 – Pitcher John Clarkson of the Cleveland Spiders records his 300th career win.
- October 15 – On the last day of the season, Bumpus Jones of the Cincinnati Reds makes his major league debut with a 7–1 no-hitter against Pittsburgh, becoming the second pitcher to hurl a no-hitter in his first start.
- October 17 – The first-half champion Boston Beaneaters and second-half champion Cleveland Spiders begin a best-of-nine "World's Championship Series" to determine an overall champion. The first game, pitched by Jack Stivetts for the Beaneaters and Cy Young for the Spiders, ends in a 0–0 tie after 11 innings.
- October 24 – The Beaneaters win their fifth consecutive game over the Spiders to capture the championship.
- November 1 – Statistics for the first 154-game season show that Dan Brouthers of the Brooklyn Grooms was the top hitter with a .335 batting average, and Cy Young of the Cleveland Spiders the best pitcher with a 36–11 record and a .766 winning percentage.
- November 17 – National League magnates conclude a four-day meeting in Chicago where they agree to shorten the 1893 schedule to 132 games and drop the split season schedule (the league's next split season would be 1981). They also pledge to continue to reduce player salaries and other team expenses.

== Births ==
=== January ===
- January 2
  - George Boehler
  - Jack Kibble
  - Merlin Kopp
- January 3 – Roland Howell
- January 4 – Charlie Miller
- January 5 – Chuck Wortman
- January 16 – Fred Bratschi
- January 17 – Roy Grover
- January 21 – Bernie Boland
- January 27 – Tatica Campos
- January 31 – Steamboat Williams

=== February ===
- February 1
  - Dixie McArthur
  - Tom McGuire
- February 4
  - Eddie Ainsmith
  - Rollie Naylor
- February 6 – Goldie Rapp
- February 8 – Manuel Cueto
- February 12 – Tom Rogers
- February 15 – Al Braithwood
- February 16 – Ed Schorr
- February 17
  - Fred Brainard
  - Nemo Leibold
- February 18 – John Gallagher
- February 19 – Weldon Wyckoff
- February 20 – John Donaldson
- February 22 – Doc Waldbauer
- February 24 – Wilbur Cooper
- February 26 – Harry Weaver
- February 29 – Ed Appleton

=== March ===
- March 6
  - Chick Davies
  - George Mohart
- March 10 – Emil Huhn
- March 12
  - Bill James
  - George Maisel
- March 13
  - Chippy Gaw
  - Patsy Gharrity
- March 21 – Bill Stumpf
- March 22 – Lew Wendell
- March 24 – Fred Trautman
- March 29 – Harry McCluskey

=== April ===
- April 1 – Claude Cooper
- April 3 – Harry Kingman
- April 11
  - Ray Gordinier
  - Red Smith
- April 13 – Pat Martin
- April 16 – Dutch Leonard
- April 17 – Morrie Schick
- April 18 – Jack Scott
- April 19
  - Bugs Bennett
  - Dave Black
  - Chick Shorten
- April 22 – Ferd Eunick
- April 25 – Snipe Conley
- April 26 – Jesse Barnes

=== May ===
- May 3 – Del Baker
- May 4
  - Zip Collins
  - Jack Tobin
  - Ted Turner
- May 7 – Allan Travers
- May 9 – Mickey Devine
- May 14 – Bruce Hartford
- May 17 – Hal Carlson
- May 18 – Bill Batsch
- May 19 – Jim Hickman
- May 23
  - Pop-Boy Smith
  - Luke Stuart
- May 24
  - Oscar Harstad
  - Joe Oeschger
- May 25 – Doug Smith
- May 31 – George Smith

=== June ===
- June 1 – Ty Tyson
- June 3 – Howard Lohr
- June 4
  - Herb Kelly
  - Paul Maloy
  - George Twombly
- June 6 – Joe Pate
- June 10 – Frank Gilhooley
- June 11
  - Clarence Woods
  - Archie Yelle
- June 16 – Jack Farrell
- June 19 – Harry Daubert
- June 22 – John Mercer
- June 24
  - Howard Fahey
  - George Harper
- June 27 – George Ross

=== July ===
- July 3 – Bunny Brief
- July 13 – Eusebio González
- July 14 – Jack Farmer
- July 15 – Bubbles Hargrave
- July 26 – Sad Sam Jones
- July 31
  - Erv Kantlehner
  - Art Nehf
  - Mutt Williams

=== August ===
- August 1 – Roy Sanders
- August 5 – Fred Ostendorf
- August 10 – Elmer Jacobs
- August 12 – Ray Schalk
- August 16 – Bill Keen
- August 17 – Johnny Rawlings
- August 19 – Rags Faircloth
- August 20 – William Rohrer
- August 25
  - Tony Boeckel
  - Johnny Jones
- August 26 – Jesse Barnes
- August 27 – Hal Janvrin
- August 28 – Braggo Roth
- August 29 – Roy Wood

=== September ===
- September 5 – Cap Crowell
- September 7 – Ginger Shinault
- September 9 – Tiny Graham
- September 11 – Ernie Koob
- September 15 – Harry Lunte
- September 17 – Tommy Taylor
- September 21 – Elmer Smith

=== October ===
- October 3 – Jack Richardson
- October 4 – Delos Brown
- October 7 – Adam DeBus
- October 8 – Harry Baumgartner
- October 9 – Arnie Stone
- October 10 – Rich Durning
- October 12 – Rupert Mills
- October 13 – Chauncey Burkam
- October 17 – Ted Welch
- October 18
  - Coonie Blank
  - Bill Johnson
- October 19 – Michael Driscoll
- October 22 – Norm McNeil
- October 24 – Dick Niehaus
- October 28 – Bill McCabe
- October 31 – Ray O'Brien

=== November ===
- November 1
  - Earl Blackburn
  - Lefty York
- November 5
  - Flame Delhi
  - Roxy Walters
  - Yam Yaryan
- November 10 – Jim Park
- November 11 – Al Schacht
- November 17
  - Don Flinn
  - Gene Steinbrenner
- November 18
  - Pedro Dibut
  - Les Mann
  - Harry Trekell
- November 19 – Everett Scott
- November 20 – Harry O'Neill
- November 22 – Pi Schwert
- November 24 – Harry Wolfe
- November 27 – Bullet Joe Bush
- November 30 – Josh Billings

=== December ===
- December 1
  - George Dickerson
  - Dean Sturgis
- December 2 – Chick Smith
- December 4 – Johnny Meador
- December 8 – Ellis Johnson
- December 13 – Ivan Bigler
- December 14 – Rudy Kallio
- December 15 – Lou Kolls
- December 16 – Scrappy Moore
- December 19 – Fred Thomas
- December 20 – Deacon Jones
- December 25
  - Walter Holke
    - Karl Kolseth
- December 26 – Lee King
- December 29 – Monroe Sweeney
- December 30 – Tom Connolly

== Deaths ==
- January 14 – Silver Flint, 36, catcher with the Chicago White Stockings for eleven seasons who batted .310 for 1881 champions
- February 10 – Ed Glenn, 31, outfielder for three major league seasons; 1884, 1886, 1888.
- March 11 – Cinders O'Brien, 24, pitcher for four seasons. Won 22 games for the 1889 Cleveland Spiders.
- March 18 – Phil Tomney, 28, shortstop for Louisville Colonels from 1888 to 1890.
- March 29 – Adam Rocap, 38?, outfielder for the 1875 Philadelphia Athletics.
- April 18 – Ned Bligh, 27, catcher for four seasons, died of Typhoid fever.
- May 21 – Hub Collins, 28, second baseman for the 1889–90 champion Brooklyn teams who led league in doubles and runs once each
- July 12 – Alexander Cartwright, 72, pioneer of the sport who formulated the first rules in 1845, developing a new sport for adults out of various existing playground games; established distance between bases at 90 feet, introduced concept of foul territory, set the number of players at nine per team, and fixed the number of outs at three per side and innings at nine; founded Knickerbocker Base Ball Club, the sport's first organized club, in New York City, and spread the sport across the nation into the 1850s.
- October 5 – Dickie Flowers, 42?, shortstop for two seasons in the National Association, 1871–72.
- November 3 – Edgar Smith, 30, played in four seasons with four teams from 1883 to 1885, and 1890.
- December 20 – John Fitzgerald, 26, pitcher for the 1890 Rochester Broncos.
