= Holbrook =

Holbrook may refer to:

== Places ==
=== England ===
- Holbrook, Derbyshire, a village
- Holbrook, Somerset, a hamlet in Charlton Musgrove
- Holbrook, Sheffield, South Yorkshire, a former mining village in Mosborough ward, now known as Halfway
- Holbrook, Suffolk, a village
- Holbrook, Horsham, West Sussex
  - Holbrook (electoral division), a West Sussex County Council constituency
- Holbrook, a tributary of the River Tame, West Midlands

=== United States ===
- Holbrook, Arizona, a city
- Holbrook, Idaho, an unincorporated community
- Holbrook, Massachusetts, a town
- Holbrook, Nebraska, a village
- Holbrook, New York, a hamlet and census-designated place
- Holbrook, Oregon, an unincorporated community
- Holbrook, Pennsylvania, an unincorporated community
- Holbrook, West Virginia, an unincorporated community
- Lake Holbrook, Texas

=== Elsewhere ===
- Holbrook, New South Wales, a town
- Holbrook Creek, Yukon, Canada
- Holbrook, Sri Lanka, a village

== People ==
- Holbrook (name), a list of people with the given name or surname

== Other uses ==
- Holbrook Academy, Suffolk, England
- Holbrook Company, US automobile body maker 1908–1930
- Holbrook High School (Arizona), US
- Holbrook-Palmer Estate, Atherton, California, US
- Holbrook railway line, New South Wales, Australia
- UK nuclear warhead, based on W76

== See also ==
- Holbrooke (disambiguation)
- Holbrooks, a residential area of Coventry, West Midlands, England
- Dr. Holbrook's Military School, New York, a former school
