= Reinecker =

Reinecker is a surname. Notable people with the surname include:

- Herbert Reinecker (1914–2007), German novelist
- Wally Reinecker (1890–1957), American baseball player

== See also ==
- Reinecke
