= Jack Dunn (baseball) =

American baseball player and manager (1872–1928)

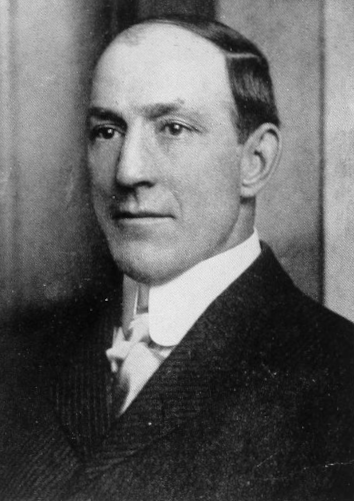
- Pitcher / Infielder
- Born: October 6, 1872; Meadville, Pennsylvania, U.S.
- Died: October 22, 1928 (aged 56); Towson, Maryland, U.S.
- Batted: Right Threw: Right

MLB debut
- May 6, 1897, for the Brooklyn Bridegrooms

Last MLB appearance
- October 4, 1904, for the New York Giants

MLB statistics
- Win–loss record: 64–59
- Earned run average: 4.11
- Strikeouts: 171
- Batting average: .245
- Stats at Baseball Reference

Teams
- Brooklyn Bridegrooms/Superbas (1897–1900); Philadelphia Phillies (1900–1901); Baltimore Orioles (1901); New York Giants (1902–1904)

John Joseph Dunn (October 6, 1872 – October 22, 1928) was an American pitcher and infielder in Major League Baseball at the turn of the 20th century who later became a minor league baseball club owner.

== Early life and playing career ==
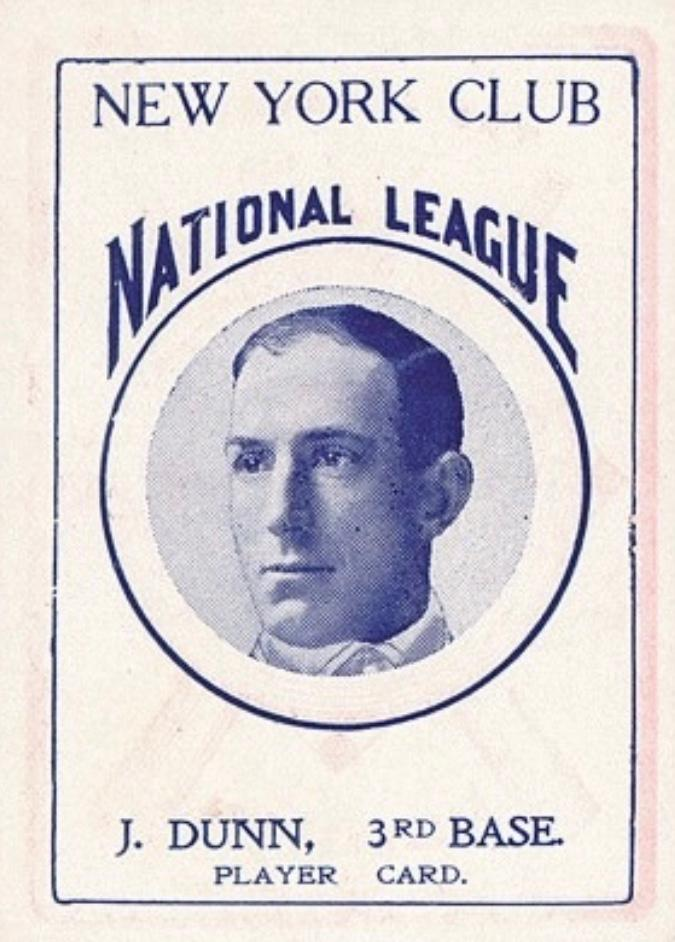
1904 baseball card

Dunn was born in Meadville, Pennsylvania, and grew up in Bayonne, New Jersey. When he was nine, a boxcar ran over his left arm while playing at a local railway. He was told by doctors that his arm had to be either amputated or risk death. He declined an amputation, but his arm was left crippled from above the elbow and couldn't lift the arm above his neck.

In 1896 Dunn played for Toronto in the Eastern League, and the following year he reached the major leagues as a pitcher for the Brooklyn Bridegrooms. He bounced around the majors for seven years, having one good season with the Bridegrooms in 1899, with a 23–13 record. When he wasn't playing, Dunn studied how the game worked from the sidelines. He was also a third baseman and shortstop. After 1904, he pitched and managed in the minors for a few seasons, winning an International League pennant in 1905.

== Minor league ownership ==
In 1907, Dunn took over as manager of the Baltimore Orioles, a minor league club with no connection to the current major league team by that name. He bought the team on November 16, 1909, for $70,000. He allegedly received a $10,000 loan from Philadelphia Athletics owner/manager Connie Mack. He developed a minor league powerhouse by scouting and developing his own players. He allegedly signed players by how they looked instead of skill, sometimes never seeing a player play before offering a contract.

In 1914, the Orioles were running away with the league pennant but losing money at the box office because of a rival team in town from the new aspiring "third major league", the Federal League. The Baltimore Terrapins played at their new steel-beamed modern stadium, Terrapin Park, which was across the street from his older "American League Park" of 1901 from the club's days in the beginnings of the "upstart" American League. To make his payroll, Dunn had to move the team to Richmond, Virginia, and sell off his star player, Babe Ruth, and 11 other players to the majors. He later said that selling Ruth was his biggest regret. Dunn was indirectly responsible for Ruth's famous nickname, with Ruth's teammates referring to him as "Dunn's $10,000 Babe" for the price he drew.

The team moved back to Baltimore in 1916, and Dunn again put together a juggernaut, ultimately signing 10 more players who went on to have solid major league careers. The best of these was pitcher Lefty Grove, who went 109–36 as an Oriole between 1920 and 1924. By that time, Dunn's team was in the midst of winning seven straight International League championships, many by huge margins. In addition to Grove, Dunn discovered other quality major leaguers such as Ernie Shore, Jack Bentley, Tommy Thomas, George Earnshaw, and Dick Porter.

Dunn's team was regarded as the equal of many major league teams, and he kept them so by refusing to trade or sell players to the majors. It wasn't until the 1925 off-season, when the other, struggling teams in the league made an agreement with the majors on a set price for transferring players, that Dunn finally relented and began selling his stars for money. His team won one more league title in 1925 and then dropped back into the pack.

Dunn's son, Jack Dunn Jr., played for the Orioles in 1914, 1918, and 1922, and was secretary and co-manager for several years until his death from pneumonia in 1923. Dunn's grandson, Jack Dunn III (1921-1987), managed the club in 1949.

Dunn ran the Orioles until his death from a heart attack in Baltimore on October 22, 1928.
