= Holbrooke =

Holbrooke may refer to:

People

- Joseph Holbrooke, English composer
- Richard Holbrooke, American diplomat

Other

- Holbrooke Hotel, in Grass Valley, California, USA
- Joseph Holbrooke (band), British musical group

== See also ==
- Holbrook (disambiguation)
