= Southern Pines Golf Club =

Golf course in North Carolina

- Interactive map of Southern Pines Golf Club
- 35°9′49″N 79°23′51″W

Club information
- Location: 290 Country Club Circle; Southern Pines, North Carolina 28387
- Established: 1906
- Type: Private
- Website: southernpinesgolfclub.com
- Designed by: Donald Ross
- Par: 71
- Length: 6,268 yards (5,731 m) (2020)
- Course rating: 69.9
- Slope rating: 127

Southern Pines Golf Course is a golf course in Southern Pines, North Carolina. The course first opened in 1906 and was played out by Donald Ross in 1910. The Southern Pines Elks Club owned the course between 1951 and 2020. Southern Pines was purchased in 2020 and renovated by architect Kyle Franz in 2021 as a 6,900 yard par 70 course.

== History ==
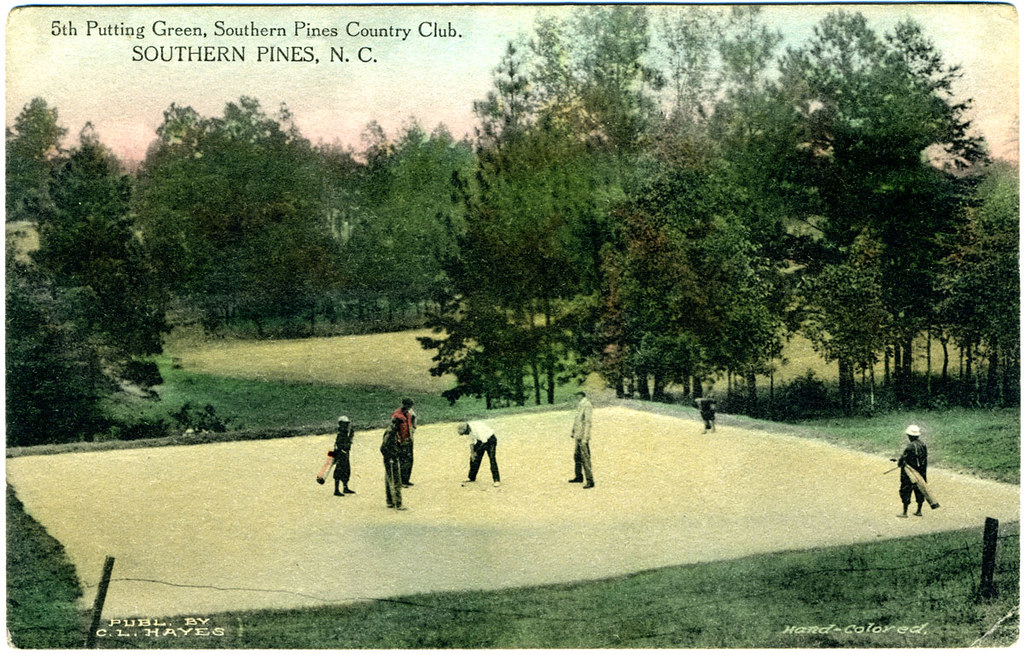
5th Putting Green, Southern Pines Country Club, 1914

Southern Pines had been settled by Scottish immigrants in the 19th century and the first golf course opened in 1896.

The town of Southern Pines formally opened the Southern Pines Country Club in 1907 adjacent to the Piney Woods Inn. At the time, the course's layout was credited to J. N. Peacock and James McNabb, both of whom were assistants to Donald Ross. The precise configuration of the earliest version of SPGC is unknown. The course was 36 holes by 1929 although by 1935 it had dropped back to 27 holes.

Mike Sherman, a Connecticut businessman, owned the course in the years following World War II.

Sam Snead set a course record of 63, eight strokes under par on November 8, 1946, in the Southern Pines open to Ben Hogan's 71. Snead broke the course record of 66, set by Johnny Schooner in 1939. The course was then 6,340 yards.

The Southern Pines Elks Club bought the course in 1951.

In December 2019, the Southern Pines Elk Club agreed to sell the golf course, clubhouse, lodge building, pool and 100-acres of land to Kaveri Investments in partnership with the owners of Pine Needles in Pinehurst and the Pine Needles Lodge and Golf Club, also in Southern Pines.

The club was sold in July 2020 and architect Kyle Franz retained to renovate the course. Franz increased the green surface, built sandscapes, and removed 700 trees to open vistas through the course and accentuate the course's elevation changes. Franz also recreated Southern Pines’ “lost hole,” which Ross had built between 1911 and 1913 in addition to the 18-hole course.

The course reopened in September 2021 with an approximately 6,900-yards, par-70 layout including “the lost hole,” as a bonus 140 yards par 3 designed with an adjacent sand green recreating the original putting surfaces installed by Ross in the 1910s before the advent of Bermuda grass greens in the 1930s.

An 18-hole 22,000-square-foot putting course was opened in September 2023 in the footprint of the former Elks Lodge. The putting course was designed by Kyle Franz, a student of Donald Ross’ work in other restoration projects and was modeled on the Himalayas putting course at St. Andrews designed by Old Tom Morris, whose work had originally inspired Ross.

== Spring Training ==
Southern Pines Country Club
- Interactive map of Southern Pines Country Club
- Owner: Southern Pines Country Club
- Surface: grass

Construction
- Opened: 1909
- Closed: 1914

Tenants
- Philadelphia Phillies (MLB) (spring training) (1909-1910, 1913); Baltimore Terrapins (FL) (spring training) (1914)

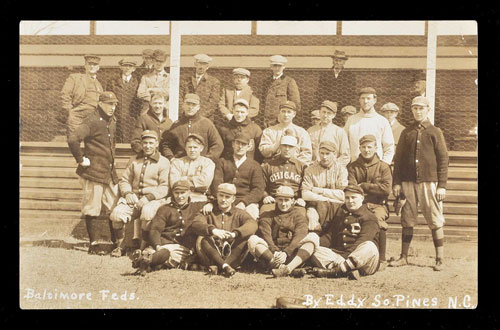
Baltimore Terrapins in March 1914 at Spring Training at Southern Pines

The Philadelphia Phillies held spring training at the Southern Pines Country Club in 1909, 1910, and 1913, and the Federal League's Baltimore Terrapins in 1914. Both teams played on the baseball field constructed along a side of the course on the club's grounds.

The Phillies had held spring training in Savannah, Georgia from 1906 to 1908. In January 1909, Southern Pines community leaders wrote Phillies business manager Bill Shettsline asking that he visit and consider the town for spring training. The town renovated the ball field's grandstand, adding three additional tiers of seating, new floors, braced the stands inside and out, and erected a canopy of canvas to shield the sun. Baseball was unpopular with the club's golfers who objected to the foul balls and other interruptions.

A Phillies intrasquad game on March 9, 1909, drew 5,000 spectators in the stands and bleachers.

Phillies owner Horace Fogel considered the purchase of ten acres in Southern Pines in March 1910 to build a permanent spring training home for the Phillies to include a playing field and building to accommodate the full team and traveling party.
