= George Maisel =

American baseball player (1892–1968)

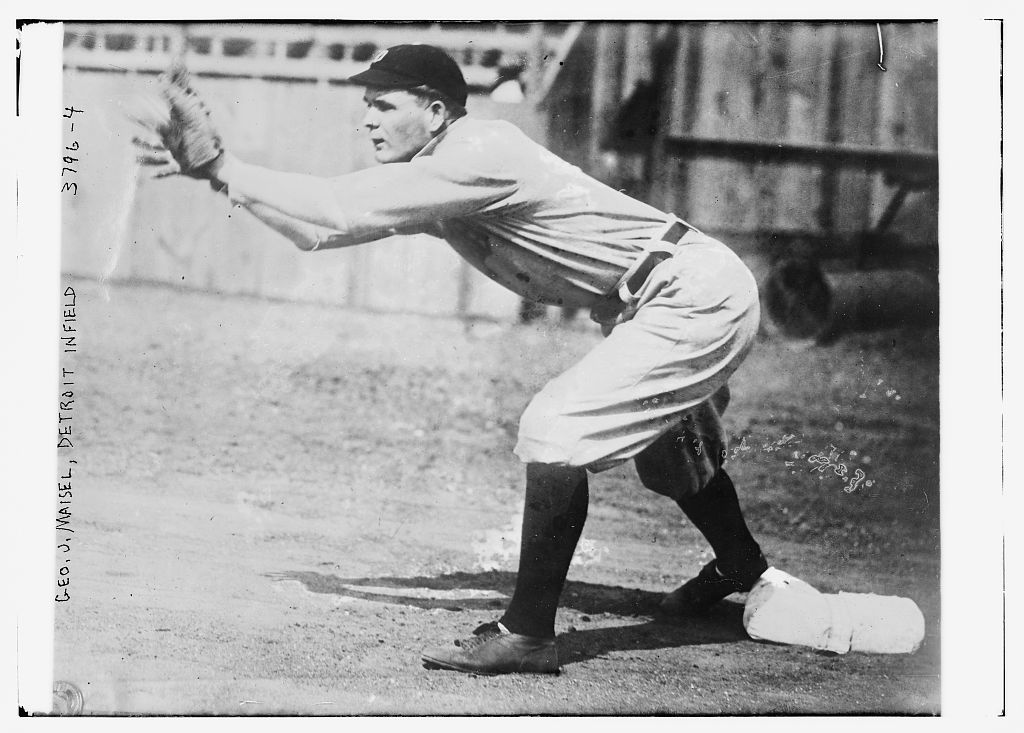
- Center fielder
- Born: March 12, 1892; Catonsville, Maryland, U.S.
- Died: December 20, 1968 (aged 76); Baltimore, Maryland, U.S.
- Batted: Right Threw: Right

MLB debut
- May 1, 1913, for the St. Louis Browns

Last MLB appearance
- September 30, 1922, for the Chicago Cubs

MLB statistics
- Batting average: .282
- Home runs: 0
- Runs batted in: 50
- Stats at Baseball Reference

Teams
- St. Louis Browns (1913); Detroit Tigers (1916); Chicago Cubs (1921–1922)

George John Maisel (March 12, 1892 – December 20, 1968) was an American Major League Baseball center fielder with the St. Louis Browns, Detroit Tigers and the Chicago Cubs between 1913 and 1922. Maisel batted and threw right-handed. He also played minor league baseball for 12 seasons and was a manager in the minor leagues from 1925 to 1927.

== Early years ==
Maisel was born in Catonsville, Maryland, in 1892.

== Baseball player ==
He began his professional baseball career in 1912 playing for the Harrisburg Senators of the Tri-State League and the Baltimore Orioles of the International League.

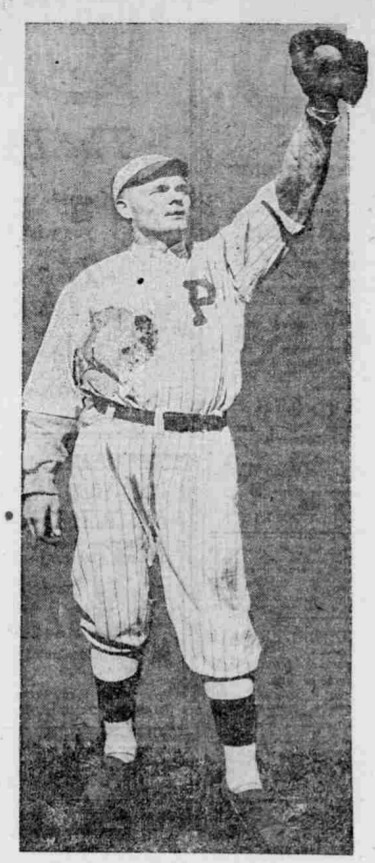
Maisel in 1919 as a member of the Portland Beavers.

On September 16, 1912, Maisel was drafted by the St. Louis Browns from Harrisburg. He appeared in 11 games for the Browns in 1913, making his major league debut on May 1, 1913, at age 21. Maisel managed only three hits in 18 at bats with the Browns for a .167 batting average.

Maisel spent the 1914 and 1915 seasons playing for the Scranton Miners of the New York State League. He compiled a .316 batting average for Scranton in 1915.

In 1916, Maisel was acquired by the Detroit Tigers and became a backup third baseman to Ossie Vitt. At the start of the 1916 season, Baseball Magazine wrote: "Maisel won universal praise for his speed, but his normal hitting gait is not strong enough at the present time to beat out such a clever performer as Oscar Vitt." Maisel appeared in only eight games for Detroit and had no hits in five at bats.

During the 1916 season, the Tigers released Maisel to the Montreal Royals of the International League. He compiled a .296 batting average in 115 games for the Royals.

In October 1916, the Tigers sold Maisel to the San Francisco Seals of the Pacific Coast League. He compiled a .308 batting average in 169 games for the Seals during the 1917 season.

During the 1919 and 1920 seasons, Maisel played for the Portland Beavers in the Pacific Coast League. He compiled a career-high .323 batting average in 1920. At the end of the 1920 season, a dispute arose as to whether the San Francisco or Portland club held the rights to Maisel.

Maisel's strong performance at Portland earned Maisel a third opportunity to play in the major leagues. He spent the 1921 and 1922 seasons with the Chicago Cubs. He had the best major league season in 1921. He was the Cubs' starting center fielder and compiled the fourth best fielding percentage (.978) among all National League outfielders. He also compiled a .310 batting average in 393 at bats. During the 1922 season, Maisel appeared in only 38 games for the Cubs. His final major league appearance was on September 30, 1922, at age 30.

Although Maisel's major league career ended in 1922, he continued to play in the minor leagues for several more years. He played for the Toronto Maple Leafs of the AA International League from 1923 to 1925. He continued to hit for good average in Toronto, compiling batting averages of .321 and .318 in 1923 and 1924.

== Baseball manager ==
Maisel served as the manager of the Wilkes-Barre Barons in 1925 and 1926 and of the Reading Keystones in 1927.

== Family and later years ==
Maisel's brother Fritz Maisel played for the New York Yankees from 1913 to 1917, and his cousin, Charlie Maisel played for the Baltimore Terrapins in 1915.

Maisel died in 1968 at Baltimore, Maryland, at age 76.
