= Joe Louis vs. Billy Conn II =

Boxing match

- Date: June 19, 1946
- Venue: Yankee Stadium, New York City, New York, U.S.
- Title(s) on the line: NBA, NYSAC, and The Ring undisputed heavyweight championship

Tale of the tape
Boxer	Joe Louis	Billy Conn
Nickname	"The Brown Bomber"	"The Pittsburgh Kid"
Hometown	Detroit, Michigan, U.S.	Pittsburgh, Pennsylvania, U.S.
Purse	$577,700	$289,000
Pre-fight record	54–1 (46 KO)	62–10–1 (13 KO)
Age	32 years, 1 month	28 years, 8 months
Height	6 ft 1 1/2 in (187 cm)	6 ft 1 1/2 in (187 cm)
Weight	207 lb (94 kg)	182 lb (83 kg)
Style	Orthodox	Orthodox
Recognition	NBA, NYSAC and The Ring undisputed Heavyweight Champion	NBA/The Ring; No. 1 Ranked Heavyweight; Former undisputed light heavyweight champion

Result
- Louis defeats Conn by 8th round KO

Joe Louis vs. Billy Conn II was a professional boxing match contested on June 19, 1946, for the undisputed heavyweight championship.

== Background ==
Following their June 1941 bout, there was immediate talk of a rematch between heavyweight champion Joe Louis and Billy Conn with promoter Mike Jacobs suggesting that the two could meet again in September. He also confirmed that previous plans for Louis to fight either Abe Simon or Buddy Baer in July were off. However, on 21 June, Jacobs confirmed that Lou Nova had signed to face Louis in September.

On 1 July, Conn secretly married Mary Louise Smith, the daughter of former Baseball player Jimmy Smith, who strongly opposed the union and had told reporters "I'll punch hell out of that fellow if he doesn't stay away from my family. I don't want my daughter to marry a prize-fighter, I know how those people end up."

Plans were in place for a 25 June 1942 rematch, however on 10 May at a family gathering following the christening of their first child, Conn's father in law, started a brawl with him that left Billy with a broken left hand. This forced the postponement of the Louis rematch first to September, then to 12 October. However, on 25 September, it was cancelled by the order of Secretary of War Henry L. Stimson, who ordered both Louis and Conn to return to their army duties.

With the end of World War II, both men were swiftly discharged from the army, Conn on 24 September 1945, Louis on 1 October. By 15 October, both men had signed to meet in June 1946. Part of the deal was that neither man was allowed to have any tune up bouts prior to the rematch. Conn had been out of the ring since February 1942, while Louis had made a title defence in November 1944 as part of an exhibition tour. In January, Jacobs confirmed the bout for 19 June at Yankee Stadium, New York City.

During the build up Louis was asked "Will you chase him if he runs backwards", this prompted the champion to respond with now the famous line: "He can run, but he can't hide".

Former 3-Division champion Henry Armstrong was among those believing that Conn would defeat Louis, telling the press "Joe is my very good friend but I think he's finding it hard to get into condition. I was at his camp a week or so ago and also visited Conn and I've got to like Conn in this fight. Louis is too slow. At least he didn't look fast to me. He's fat and flabby and I believe Conn will be too fast for him. Billy should outpoint him.".

The would be the first heavyweight title bout to set broadcast live on television, with NBC acquiring the rights.

Louis was a 7 to 2 favourite to win.

== The fight ==
Unlike the action packed first bout, the rematch was much less exciting, with both men appearing to be not the same fighters that they were before war. The pace was much slower, with Louis stalking and Conn circling out of danger, prompting boos from a frustrated crowd of 45,266. A hard right to the chin staggered Conn in the 5th, but Louis was unable to drop the challenger. Midway through the 8th round, a right from Louis opened up a cut over Conn's left eye. The champion followed up with a left and right that again staggered Conn, before a left hook flattened the challenger. He was counted out by referee Eddie Joseph giving Louis another knockout victory.

At the time of the stoppage Louis led of all three scorecards, 5–2, 5–1–1 & 5–1–1. The Associated Press also had it 5–2 for Louis.

== Aftermath ==
Speaking in his dressing room Conn announced his retirement saying that "This was my last fight. I'm through, I just haven't got it." before admitting that "We were both better fighters five years ago. We lost a lot." When asked, "When did he hurt you?" Conn replied "When he hit me". After being asked if he would fight again, he replied with a smile "As lousy as I was, I should re-enlist in the Army!"

When asked about the knockout Louis said "I told my corner it was time to go out and see if I could still fight and he could still take it. He was better fighter the first time."

This was the biggest championship fight gate that promoter Mike Jacobs managed in his career, grossing $1,925,564 ($31,790,000 adjusted for inflation).

Louis would return to ring in September to face Tami Mauriello, while Conn would briefly return for a pair of bouts in November 1948 but otherwise remained retired.

=== Match fixing allegation ===
The day after the bout, Representative Donald Lawrence O'Toole from New York's 13th congressional district wrote to the New York Athletic Commission demanding they investigate the fight, alleging that it was fixed. The commission took no action however.

== Undercard ==
Confirmed bouts:

== Broadcasting ==
Country	Broadcaster
United States	NBC

Preceded by vs. Johnny Davis	Joe Louis's bouts 19 June 1946	Succeeded by vs. Tami Mauriello
Preceded by vs. Tony Zale	Billy Conn's bouts 19 June 1946	Succeeded by vs. Mike O'Dowd
