= Ducky Yount =

American baseball player (1885-1970)

- Pitcher
- Born: December 7, 1885; Iredell County, North Carolina, U.S.
- Died: May 9, 1970 (aged 84); Winston-Salem, North Carolina, U.S.
- Batted: Right Threw: Right

MLB debut
- May 20, 1914, for the Baltimore Terrapins

Last MLB appearance
- August 15, 1914, for the Baltimore Terrapins

MLB statistics
- Win–loss record: 1-1
- Earned run average: 4.14
- Strikeouts: 19
- Stats at Baseball Reference

Teams
- Baltimore Terrapins (1914)

Herbert Macon Yount [Ducky/Hub] (December 7, 1885 – May 9, 1970) was an American professional baseball pitcher. He played one season in Major League Baseball for the Baltimore Terrapins of the Federal League in 1914. He threw right-handed and batted right-handed. He was 6'2 and 178 lbs (pounds) and in 1914 he was 28. He was born on December 7, 1885, in Iredell County, North Carolina, and died on May 9, 1970, in Winston-Salem, North Carolina.

== Sources ==
- Career statistics from Baseball Reference · Baseball Reference (Minors) · Retrosheet · Baseball Almanac
