= Charlie Eakle =

American baseball player (1887–1959)

- Second baseman
- Born: September 27, 1887; Baltimore, Maryland
- Died: June 15, 1959 (aged 71); Baltimore, Maryland
- Batted: Unknown Threw: Unknown

MLB debut
- August 20, 1915, for the Baltimore Terrapins

Last MLB appearance
- August 21, 1915, for the Baltimore Terrapins

MLB statistics
- At bats: 7
- RBI: 0
- Home runs: 0
- Batting average: .286
- Stats at Baseball Reference

Teams
- Baltimore Terrapins (1915)

Charles Emory Eakle (September 27, 1887 – June 15, 1959) was an American professional baseball player who played in 2 games for the Baltimore Terrapins during the 1915 season. He was born in Maryland and died in Baltimore, Maryland, at the age of 71.
