= John Allen (baseball) =

American baseball player (1890-1967)

- Pitcher
- Born: October 27, 1890; Berkeley Springs, West Virginia, US
- Died: September 24, 1967 (aged 76); Hagerstown, Maryland, US
- Batted: Right Threw: Right

MLB debut
- June 2, 1914, for the Baltimore Terrapins

Last MLB appearance
- June 2, 1914, for the Baltimore Terrapins

MLB statistics
- Win–loss record: 0–0
- Earned run average: 18.00
- Strikeouts: 2
- Stats at Baseball Reference

Teams
- Baltimore Terrapins (1914)

John Marshall Allen (October 27, 1890 – September 24, 1967) was an American professional baseball player whose career spanned three seasons, including one in Major League Baseball with the Baltimore Terrapins (1914). He played the pitcher position. Allen played one game in the majors and gave-up four runs, all earned. Allen also played in the minor leagues with the Class-C Lynchburg Shoemakers (1912) and the Class-D Hagerstown Terriers (1917). In the minors, Allen compiled a record of 6–8 in 16 games. He also managed one season in 1945 with the Greensboro Patriots. Allen served in World War I.

== Professional career ==
Allen began his professional baseball career in 1912 with the Class-C Lynchburg Shoemakers of the Virginia League. With the Shoemakers, Allen compiled a record 2–3 in 44 innings pitched. In 1914, Allen joined the Baltimore Terrapins. On June 2, 1914, Allen played his only Major League Baseball game. He pitched two innings and gave-up two hits, four runs (all earned) and two walks. Allen also struck out two. In Robert Peyton Wiggins's book The Federal League of Base Ball Clubs, he states that Allen "deserted" the Terrapins to play with the minor league Montreal Royals of the International League. However, the move backfired when Allen was not signed by the Royals. According to the Society for American Baseball Research, Allen served in Europe during World War I. Allen joined the Class-D Hagerstown Terriers of the Blue Ridge League in 1917. He went 4–5 in 10 games. Allen also batted .135 with five hits, one double and one home run in 37 at-bats. In 1945, Allen became the manager of the minor league Greensboro Patriots. It was Allen's only season as a manager.

== Personal ==
Allen was born on October 27, 1890, in Berkeley Springs, West Virginia. He died on September 24, 1967, in Hagerstown, Maryland and was buried at Rose Hill Cemetery in Hagerstown.
