= Tommy Vereker =

American baseball player

- Pitcher
- Born: December 2, 1893; Baltimore, Maryland, U.S.
- Died: April 2, 1974 (aged 80); Baltimore, Maryland, U.S.
- Batted: Unknown Threw: Unknown

MLB debut
- June 17, 1915, for the Baltimore Terrapins

Last MLB appearance
- June 22, 1915, for the Baltimore Terrapins

MLB statistics
- Win–loss record: 0-0
- Earned run average: 15.00
- Strikeouts: 1
- Stats at Baseball Reference

Teams
- Baltimore Terrapins (1915)

John James "Tommy" Vereker (December 2, 1893 – April 2, 1974) was an American baseball player who played two games for the Baltimore Terrapins of the Federal League during the 1915 season. He was born in Baltimore, Maryland, and died there at the age of 80.
