= Frank Lobert =

American baseball player (1883-1932)

- Third baseman
- Born: November 26, 1883; Williamsport, Pennsylvania, U.S.
- Died: May 29, 1932 (aged 48); Pittsburgh, Pennsylvania, U.S.
- Batted: Right Threw: Right

MLB debut
- June 6, 1914, for the Baltimore Terrapins

Last MLB appearance
- June 22, 1914, for the Baltimore Terrapins

MLB statistics
- Games: 11
- At bats: 30
- Hit(s): 6
- Stats at Baseball Reference

Teams
- Baltimore Terrapins (1914)

Frank John Lobert (November 26, 1883 – May 29, 1932) was an American Major League Baseball first baseman who played for the Baltimore Terrapins of the Federal League in 1915. Lobert played in several minor leagues from 1909 to 1911.

He was the brother of fellow major leaguer Hans Lobert, and cousin of Joe Schultz, Sr., and his son Joe Schultz, Jr.
