= Charlie Young (baseball) =

American baseball player (1893–1952)

- Pitcher
- Born: January 12, 1893; Philadelphia, Pennsylvania, U.S.
- Died: May 12, 1952 (aged 59); Riverside, New Jersey, U.S.
- Batted: Both Threw: Right

MLB debut
- September 5, 1915, for the Baltimore Terrapins

Last MLB appearance
- October 3, 1915, for the Baltimore Terrapins

MLB statistics
- Win–loss record: 2–3
- Earned run average: 5.91
- Strikeouts: 13
- Stats at Baseball Reference

Teams
- Baltimore Terrapins (1915)

Charles Young (January 12, 1893 – May 12, 1952), nicknamed "CY", was an American professional baseball pitcher. He played for one season in Major League Baseball, appearing in 9 games for the Baltimore Terrapins of the Federal League during the 1915 season.
