= Guy Zinn =

American baseball player (1887–1949)

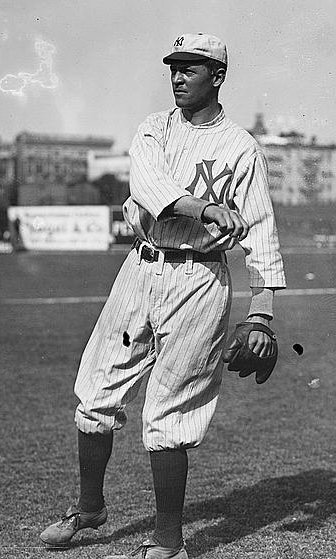
- Outfielder
- Born: February 13, 1887; Holbrook, West Virginia, U.S.
- Died: October 6, 1949 (aged 62); Nutter Fort, West Virginia, U.S.
- Batted: Left Threw: Right

MLB debut
- September 11, 1911, for the New York Highlanders

Last MLB appearance
- September 16, 1915, for the Baltimore Terrapins

MLB statistics
- Batting average: .269
- Home runs: 15
- Runs batted in: 139
- Stats at Baseball Reference

Teams
- New York Highlanders (1911–1912); Boston Braves (1913); Baltimore Terrapins (1914–1915)

Guy Zinn (February 13, 1887 – October 6, 1949) was an American professional baseball outfielder. He played all or part of five seasons in Major League Baseball from 1911 to 1915.

== Baseball career ==
Zinn played his first game on September 11, 1911, for the New York Highlanders of the American League. On April 20, 1912, he scored the first-ever run at Fenway Park.

In 1912, he played 106 games for the Highlanders with 105 hits and 6 home runs (fourth in the American League) with 55 runs batted in. The next season, in 1913, he played for the Boston Braves of the National League, hitting .297 in 36 games.

He played his final two seasons for the Baltimore Terrapins of the Federal League, garnering 147 hits and 8 home runs over that period. He played his last game on September 16, 1915, with Baltimore. His career batting average was .269, with 297 hits.
