= Larry Douglas (baseball) =

American baseball player (1890-1949)

- Pitcher
- Born: June 5, 1890; Jellico, Tennessee
- Died: November 4, 1949 (aged 59); Jellico, Tennessee
- Batted: Right Threw: Right

MLB debut
- June 17, 1915, for the Baltimore Terrapins

Last MLB appearance
- June 25, 1915, for the Baltimore Terrapins

MLB statistics
- Win–loss record: 1–0
- Earned run average: 3.00
- Strikeouts: 1
- Stats at Baseball Reference

Teams
- Baltimore Terrapins (1915)

Lawrence Howard Douglas (June 5, 1890 – November 4, 1949) was a Major League Baseball pitcher who played for the Baltimore Terrapins of the Federal League in 1915. He also played in the minor leagues in 1915 and 1916 with the Martinsburg Champs and the Wheeling Stogies.
