= Yip Owens =

American baseball player (1886–1958)

Owens
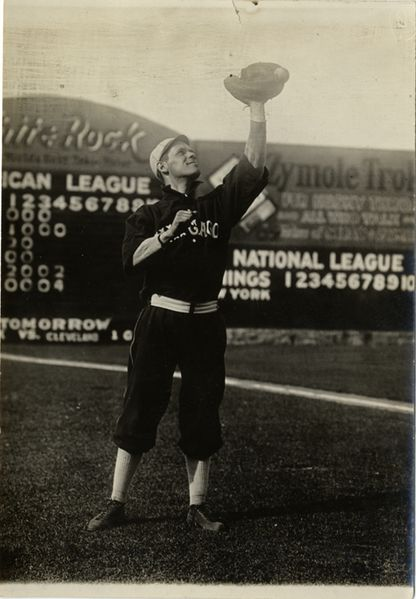
- Catcher
- Born: January 25, 1886; Toronto, Ontario
- Died: July 2, 1958 (aged 72); Minneapolis, Minnesota
- Batted: Right Threw: Right

MLB debut
- September 11, 1905, for the Boston Americans

Last MLB appearance
- October 3, 1915, for the Baltimore Terrapins

MLB statistics
- Batting average: .245
- Home runs: 5
- Runs batted in: 65
- Stats at Baseball Reference

Teams
- Boston Americans (1905); Chicago White Sox (1909); Brooklyn Tip-Tops (1914); Baltimore Terrapins (1915)

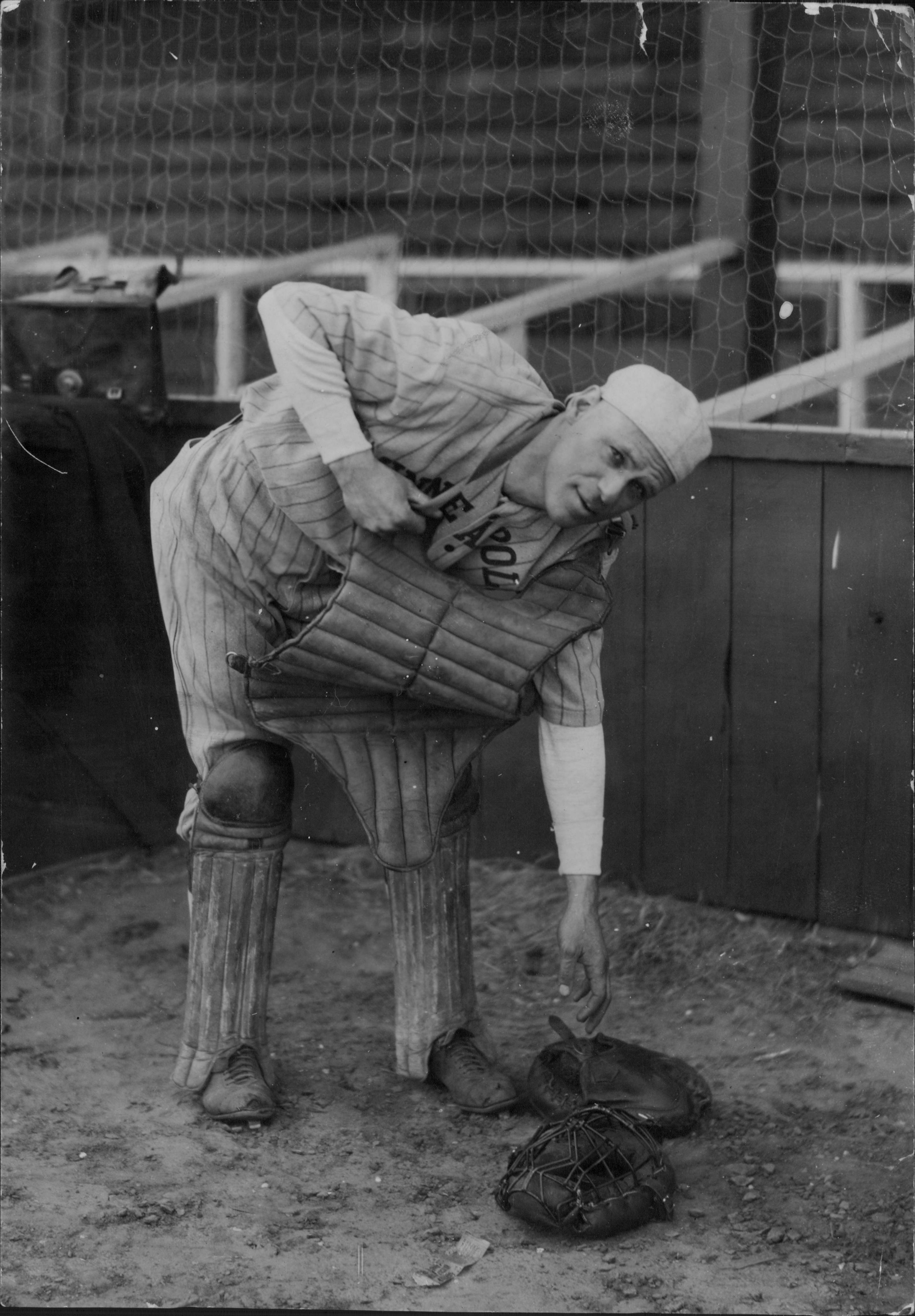
Owens, also known as 'Old Reliable', catching for the Minneapolis Millers, date unknown

Frank Walter "Yip" Owens (January 25, 1886 – July 2, 1958) played the position of catcher for professional baseball teams in the American League in 1905 and 1909, and for teams in the Federal League in 1914 and 1915.

Owens was nicknamed "Yip" because his hometown was Ypsilanti, Michigan.
