= Jimmy Smith (1910s infielder) =

American baseball player (1895–1974)

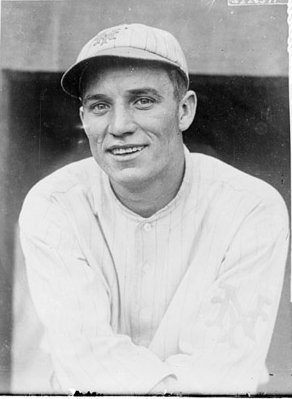
- Smith with the New York Giants in 1917
- Infielder
- Born: May 15, 1895; Pittsburgh, Pennsylvania, U.S.
- Died: January 1, 1974 (aged 78); Pittsburgh, Pennsylvania, U.S.
- Batted: Both Threw: Right

MLB debut
- September 26, 1914, for the Chicago Chi-Feds

Last MLB appearance
- September 3, 1922, for the Philadelphia Phillies

MLB statistics
- Batting average: .219
- Home runs: 12
- Runs batted in: 108
- Stats at Baseball Reference

Teams
- Chicago Chi-Feds/Whales (1914–1915); Baltimore Terrapins (1915); Pittsburgh Pirates (1916); New York Giants (1917); Boston Braves (1918); Cincinnati Reds (1919); Philadelphia Phillies (1921–1922)

Career highlights and awards
- World Series champion (1919)

James Lawrence Smith (May 15, 1895 – January 1, 1974) was an American Major League Baseball infielder often referred to as "Greenfield Jimmy" or "Bluejacket".

Smith was a switch hitter and threw right-handed. His major league debut came on September 26, 1914, with the Chicago Chi-Feds. In 1919, he won the World Series with the Cincinnati Reds, and he went on to play his final game with the Philadelphia Phillies on September 3, 1922.

During Prohibition, Smith smuggled bootlegged alcohol from various cities into his Greenfield neighborhood. After retiring from baseball, he joined National Distillers company as general manager. He is buried in Calvary Cemetery in Pittsburgh.

== Family ==
Smith had four children: Mary Louise, Jimmy Jr., Nora, and Tommy. Jimmy Jr. played baseball for the University of Pennsylvania, and some professional baseball in the minor leagues with the Gladewater Bears, a team in the Texas League. Tommy played basketball at Pennsylvania and then attended the Wharton school of business. Jimmy Jr. had a son, Jimmy Smith III, who was an All-Ivy League football player at the University of Pennsylvania. Jimmy Smith III signed a contract to play with the Pittsburgh Steelers in 1983 but was released after a knee injury.

Smith was the father-in-law of world light heavyweight champion Billy Conn. A rematch against Joe Louis in 1942 had to be abruptly cancelled after Conn broke his hand in a much-publicized fight with Smith.

Smith's great-granddaughter is swimmer Leah Smith.
