= Vern Hughes =

American baseball player

- Pitcher
- Born: April 15, 1893; Etna, Pennsylvania
- Died: September 26, 1961 (aged 68); Sewickley, Pennsylvania
- Batted: Left Threw: Left

MLB debut
- July 6, 1914, for the Baltimore Terrapins

Last MLB appearance
- September 10, 1914, for the Baltimore Terrapins

MLB statistics
- Win–loss record: 0–0
- Earned run average: 3.18
- Strikeouts: 0
- Stats at Baseball Reference

Teams
- Baltimore Terrapins (1914)

Vernon Alexander "Lefty" Hughes (April 15, 1893 – September 26, 1961) was a Major League Baseball pitcher who played for the Baltimore Terrapins of the Federal League in 1914.
