= Coonie Blank =

American baseball player (1892–1961)

- Catcher
- Born: October 18, 1892; St. Louis, Missouri, U.S.
- Died: December 8, 1961 (aged 69); St. Louis, Missouri, U.S.
- Batted: Right Threw: Right

MLB debut
- August 15, 1909, for the St. Louis Cardinals

Last MLB appearance
- August 15, 1909, for the St. Louis Cardinals

MLB statistics
- Batting average: .000
- Home runs: 0
- Runs batted in: 0
- Stats at Baseball Reference

Teams
- St. Louis Cardinals (1909)

Frank Ignatz Blank (October 18, 1892 – December 8, 1961) was an American catcher in Major League Baseball. He played in one game for the St. Louis Cardinals on August 15, 1909, and was hitless in two at-bats.
