= Jack Ridgway =

American baseball player (1888-1928)

- Pitcher
- Born: July 23, 1888; Philadelphia, Pennsylvania, U.S.
- Died: February 23, 1928 (aged 39); Philadelphia, Pennsylvania, U.S.
- Batted: Left Threw: Right

MLB debut
- May 20, 1914, for the Baltimore Terrapins

Last MLB appearance
- June 16, 1914, for the Baltimore Terrapins

MLB statistics
- Win–loss record: 0–1
- Earned run average: 11.00
- Strikeouts: 2
- Stats at Baseball Reference

Teams
- Baltimore Terrapins (1914)

Jacob Augustus "Jack" Ridgway (July 23, 1888 – February 23, 1928) was an American Major League Baseball pitcher who played for the Baltimore Terrapins of the Federal League in 1914.
