= Holbrook, Sri Lanka =

Holbrook
- Town
- Location within Sri Lanka
- Coordinates: 6°51′55″N 80°42′50″E
- Country: Sri Lanka
- Province: Central Province
- District: Nuwara Eliya District

Population (2012)
  - Total: 3,217
- Time zone: UTC+5:30 (SLT)

Holbrook is a town in Sri Lanka. It is located within the Central Province.

== See also ==
- List of towns in Central Province, Sri Lanka
