= Steve Evans (baseball) =

American baseball player (1885–1943)

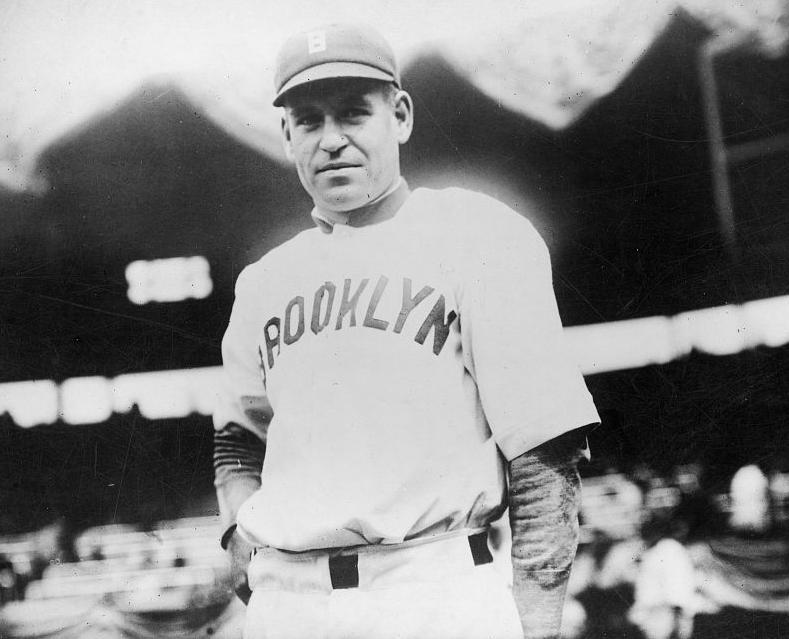
- Outfielder
- Born: February 17, 1885; Cleveland, Ohio, U.S.
- Died: December 28, 1943 (aged 58); Cleveland, Ohio, U.S.
- Batted: Left Threw: Left

MLB debut
- April 16, 1908, for the New York Giants

Last MLB appearance
- October 3, 1915, for the Baltimore Terrapins

MLB statistics
- Batting average: .287
- Home runs: 32
- Runs batted in: 466
- Stats at Baseball Reference

Teams
- New York Giants (1908); St. Louis Cardinals (1909–1913); Brooklyn Tip-Tops (1914–1915); Baltimore Terrapins (1915)

Louis Richard (Steve) Evans (February 17, 1885 – December 28, 1943) was an American right fielder in Major League Baseball. He played in the National League (NL) for the New York Giants (1908) and St. Louis Cardinals (1910–13), and in the Federal League (FL) for the Brooklyn Tip-Tops (1914–15) and Baltimore Terrapins (1915). Evans batted and threw left-handed.

== Early life ==
Evans was born in Cleveland, Ohio. He was known as Steve, but the origins of that nickname are unclear. Evans entered professional baseball in 1907 with Dayton of the Class-B Central League.

== Major league career ==
Evans made the major leagues with the New York Giants in 1908, but he played in only two games. He spent most of his career with the St. Louis Cardinals, serving as their starting right fielder from 1909 to 1913. He jumped to the FL for 1914 and 1915, which were his last two seasons in the major leagues. He led the FL in triples (15) in 1914 and in doubles (34) in 1915.

In an eight-season major league career, Evans posted a .287 batting average with 32 home runs and 466 RBI in 978 games played. He added 478 runs, 963 hits, 175 doubles, 67 triples and 86 stolen bases.

He led the NL in being hit by pitched balls each year from 1910 to 1912, setting a single-season record of 31 in 1910 that stood for 61 years before it was broken by Ron Hunt. He also set the record for being hit by a pitch in a single game, being hit three times in a game against Brooklyn.

Evans was known as a jokester on the baseball field. Sportswriter Fred Lieb said that Evans was "one of baseball's delightful screwballs". During one game, he took the field holding a parasol, then sat on a stool before lighting a cigarette. Evans's demeanor may have irritated Giants manager John McGraw in 1908 and contributed to Evans's short stay in New York. However, when McGraw assembled a team for a 1913-1914 baseball world tour, he invited Evans to play. Another baseball cutup, Germany Schaefer, also joined that team, and McGraw may have invited them for their ability to charm the fans and relax their teammates.

== Death ==
Evans died at home in Cleveland in December 1943.

== See also ==
- List of Major League Baseball annual doubles leaders
- List of Major League Baseball annual triples leaders
