= Charlie Maisel =

American baseball player (1894-1953)

- Catcher
- Born: April 21, 1894; Catonsville, Maryland
- Died: August 25, 1953 (aged 63); Baltimore, Maryland
- Batted: Right Threw: Right

MLB debut
- October 2, 1915, for the Baltimore Terrapins

Last MLB appearance
- October 2, 1915, for the Baltimore Terrapins

MLB statistics
- Games played: 1
- At bats: 4
- Hits: 0

Teams
- Baltimore Terrapins (1915)

Charles Louis Maisel (April 21, 1894 – August 25, 1953), was a Major League Baseball player for the Federal League Baltimore Terrapins. He was a cousin to fellow Major League Baseball players Fritz Maisel, and George Maisel.

Maisel played one game in his career, on October 2, 1915.
