= Charlie Miller (pinch hitter) =

American baseball player (1877-1951)

- Pinch hitter
- Born: December 30, 1877; Conestoga, Pennsylvania
- Died: January 13, 1951 (aged 73); Millersville, Pennsylvania
- Batted: Right Threw: Right

MLB debut
- October 2, 1915, for the Baltimore Terrapins

Last MLB appearance
- October 2, 1915, for the Baltimore Terrapins

MLB statistics
- Games played: 1
- At bats: 1
- Hits: 0
- Stats at Baseball Reference

Teams
- Baltimore Terrapins (1915)

Charles Hess Miller (December 30, 1877 – January 13, 1951) was an American professional baseball player. At the age of 37, he appeared in one game in Major League Baseball for the Baltimore Terrapins on October 2, 1915. Pinch hitting for second baseman John Gallagher with two outs in the bottom of the ninth inning, and with the Terrapins down 7–1, Miller struck out to end the game.
