= Ken Crawford (baseball) =

American baseball player (1894-1976)

- First baseman
- Born: October 31, 1894; South Bend, Indiana
- Died: November 11, 1976 (aged 82); Pittsburgh, Pennsylvania
- Batted: Left Threw: Right

MLB debut
- September 6, 1915, for the Baltimore Terrapins

Last MLB appearance
- October 3, 1915, for the Baltimore Terrapins

MLB statistics
- Games played: 23
- At bats: 82
- Hits: 20

Teams
- Baltimore Terrapins (1915)

Kenneth Daniel Crawford (October 31, 1894 – November 11, 1976) was a Major League Baseball player for the Federal League Baltimore Terrapins. He also attended the University of Pittsburgh.
