= Ed Forsyth =

American baseball player (1887-1956)

- Third baseman
- Born: April 30, 1887; Kingston, New York, U.S.
- Died: June 22, 1956 (aged 69); Hoboken, New Jersey, U.S.
- Batted: Right Threw: Right

MLB debut
- October 2, 1915, for the Baltimore Terrapins

Last MLB appearance
- October 2, 1915, for the Baltimore Terrapins

MLB statistics
- Games: 1
- At bats: 3
- Hit(s): 0
- Stats at Baseball Reference

Teams
- Baltimore Terrapins (1915)

Edward James Forsyth (April 30, 1887 – June 22, 1956) was an American Major League Baseball third baseman who played in one game on October 2, 1915 for the Baltimore Terrapins of the Federal League. He was the starting third baseman in the second game of a doubleheader that day; it was the last game the Terrapins would ever play, and the last day the Federal League was in existence.

In his only career Major League game, Forsyth had no hits in three at bats with one walk, and made one error in three chances in the field. The Terrapins lost the game 3-2. There are no records of Forsyth ever having played professional baseball at any other level.
