= Jimmy Walsh (infielder) =

American baseball player (1886-1947)

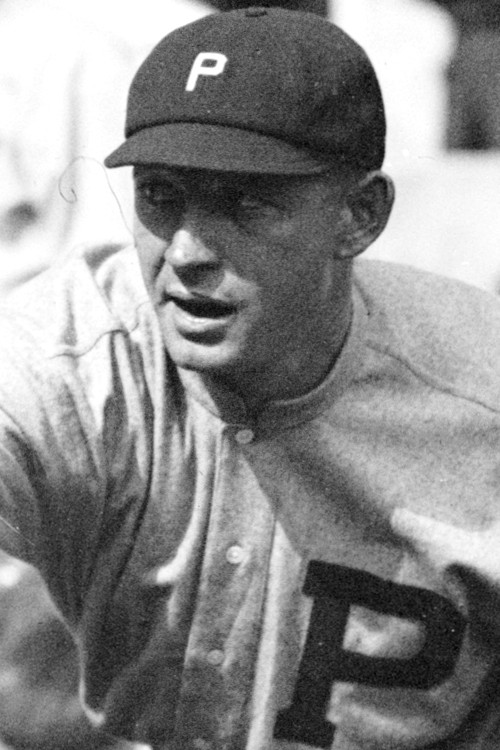
- Third baseman
- Born: March 25, 1886; Lima, Ohio, U.S.
- Died: January 21, 1947 (aged 60); Baltimore, Maryland, U.S.
- Batted: Right Threw: Right

MLB debut
- April 25, 1910, for the Philadelphia Phillies

Last MLB appearance
- September 29, 1915, for the St. Louis Terriers

MLB statistics
- Batting average: .285
- Home runs: 25
- Runs batted in: 212
- Stats at Baseball Reference

Teams
- Philadelphia Phillies (1910–1913); Baltimore Terrapins (1914–1915); St. Louis Terriers (1915)

Michael Timothy Walsh (March 25, 1886 – January 21, 1947) was an American Major League Baseball player. Walsh played for the Philadelphia Phillies, the Baltimore Terrapins, and the St. Louis Terriers. He batted and threw right-handed.

He was born in Lima, Ohio, and died in Baltimore, Maryland.

In 502 games over six seasons, Walsh posted a .285 batting average (447-for-1571) with 178 runs, 25 home runs, 212 RBI, 45 stolen bases and 101 bases on balls.

Although his primary position was third base, he played at least one game at every position in his major league career.
