= Jim Hickman (1910s outfielder) =

American baseball player (1892–1958)

- Outfielder
- Born: May 19, 1892; Johnson City, Tennessee
- Died: December 30, 1958 (aged 66); Brooklyn, New York
- Batted: Right Threw: Right

MLB debut
- September 17, 1915, for the Baltimore Terrapins

Last MLB appearance
- September 27, 1919, for the Brooklyn Robins

MLB statistics
- Batting average: .217
- Home runs: 8
- Runs batted in: 70
- Stats at Baseball Reference

Teams
- Baltimore Terrapins (1915); Brooklyn Robins (1916–1919)

David James Hickman (May 19, 1892 – December 30, 1958) was a former professional baseball player who played outfield from 1915 to 1919.
