= John Gallagher (baseball) =

American baseball player (1892-1952)

- Second baseman
- Born: February 18, 1892; Pittsburgh, Pennsylvania
- Died: March 30, 1952 (aged 60); Norfolk, Virginia
- Batted: Right Threw: Right

MLB debut
- August 20, 1915, for the Baltimore Terrapins

Last MLB appearance
- October 3, 1915, for the Baltimore Terrapins

MLB statistics
- Batting average: .198
- Home runs: 0
- Runs batted in: 4
- Stats at Baseball Reference

Teams
- Baltimore Terrapins (1915)

John Carroll Gallagher (February 18, 1892 – March 30, 1952) was a Major League Baseball second baseman who played for the Baltimore Terrapins of the Federal League in 1915.
