= Vern Duncan =

American baseball player

- Outfielder
- Born: January 6, 1890; Clayton, North Carolina, U.S.
- Died: June 1, 1954 (aged 64); Daytona Beach, Florida, U.S.
- Batted: Left Threw: Right

MLB debut
- September 11, 1913, for the Philadelphia Phillies

Last MLB appearance
- October 3, 1915, for the Baltimore Terrapins

MLB statistics
- Batting average: .279
- Home runs: 4
- Runs batted in: 97
- Stats at Baseball Reference

Teams
- Philadelphia Phillies (1913); Baltimore Terrapins (1914–1915)

Vernon Van Duke Duncan (January 6, 1890 – June 1, 1954) was an American Major League Baseball outfielder. He began his major league career late in the 1913 season with the Philadelphia Phillies, then jumped to the new Federal League during the offseason. He spent the next two seasons as a starting outfielder for the Baltimore Terrapins, playing mostly as a center fielder. Although he continued to play professionally in the minor leagues until 1927, Duncan never played in the majors again.

== Sources ==
- Career statistics from Baseball Reference · Baseball Reference (Minors) · Retrosheet · Baseball Almanac
