= Harvey Russell =

American baseball player (1887-1980)

- Catcher
- Born: January 10, 1887; Marshall, Virginia, U.S.
- Died: January 8, 1980 (aged 92); Alexandria, Virginia, U.S.
- Batted: Left Threw: Right

MLB debut
- April 17, 1914, for the Baltimore Terrapins

Last MLB appearance
- October 3, 1915, for the Baltimore Terrapins

MLB statistics
- Batting average: .241
- Home runs: 0
- Runs batted in: 24
- Stats at Baseball Reference

Teams
- Baltimore Terrapins (1914–1915)

Harvey Holmes Russell (January 10, 1887 – January 8, 1980) was an American Major League Baseball player. Russell played for the Baltimore Terrapins in 1914 and 1915. He batted left and threw right-handed.

Russell was in the United States military during World War I. He served as a doughboy in France.

He was born in Marshall, Virginia and died in Alexandria, Virginia.
