= Doc Kerr =

American baseball player (1882-1937)

- Catcher
- Born: January 17, 1882; Dellroy, Ohio, U.S.
- Died: January 9, 1937 (aged 54); Baltimore, Maryland, U.S.
- Batted: Both Threw: Right

MLB debut
- April 22, 1914, for the Pittsburgh Rebels

Last MLB appearance
- August 26, 1915, for the Baltimore Terrapins

MLB statistics
- Batting average: .252
- Home runs: 1
- Runs batted in: 8
- Stats at Baseball Reference

Teams
- Pittsburgh Rebels (1914); Baltimore Terrapins (1914–1915)

John Jonas "Doc" Kerr (January 17, 1882 – January 9, 1937) was an American Major League Baseball player who played for the Pittsburgh Rebels and the Baltimore Terrapins in 1914 and 1915.
