= Holbrook, West Virginia =

Holbrook
- Unincorporated community
- Location within the state of West Virginia Holbrook (the United States)
- Coordinates: 39°9′8″N 80°51′21″W
- Country: United States
- State: West Virginia
- County: Ritchie
- Elevation: 797 ft (243 m)
- Time zone: UTC-5 (Eastern (EST))
  - Summer (DST): UTC-4 (EDT)
- GNIS ID: 1540380

Holbrook was an unincorporated community in Ritchie County, West Virginia, United States.

Holbrook was founded in 1865.
