= Fred Jacklitsch =

American baseball player (1876–1937)

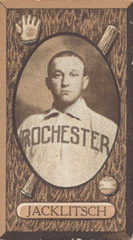
- Catcher
- Born: May 24, 1876; Brooklyn, New York, U.S.
- Died: July 18, 1937 (aged 61); Brooklyn, New York, U.S.
- Batted: Right Threw: Right

MLB debut
- June 6, 1900, for the Philadelphia Phillies

Last MLB appearance
- June 30, 1917, for the Boston Braves

MLB statistics
- Batting average: .243
- Home runs: 5
- Runs batted in: 153
- Stats at Baseball Reference

Teams
- Philadelphia Phillies (1900–1902); Brooklyn Superbas (1903–1904); New York Highlanders (1905); Philadelphia Phillies (1907–1910); Baltimore Terrapins (1914–1915); Boston Braves (1917)

Frederick Lawrence Jacklitsch (May 24, 1876 – July 18, 1937) was an American professional baseball player. He played all or part of thirteen seasons in Major League Baseball between 1900 and 1917, primarily as a catcher. Jacklitsch served as the head coach for Amherst College baseball from 1919–1925 from Rutgers baseball from 1926–1931, accumulating a record of 43–42.

Jacklitsch died at his home in Laurelton, Queens on the morning of July 18, 1937. His funeral occurred on July 20.
