= Karl Kolseth =

American baseball player (1892-1956)

- First baseman
- Born: December 25, 1892; Cambridge, Massachusetts, U.S.
- Died: May 3, 1956 (aged 63); Cumberland, Maryland, U.S.
- Batted: Left Threw: Right

MLB debut
- September 30, 1915, for the Baltimore Terrapins

Last MLB appearance
- October 3, 1915, for the Baltimore Terrapins

MLB statistics
- Games: 6
- At bats: 23
- Hit(s): 6
- Stats at Baseball Reference

Teams
- Baltimore Terrapins (1915)

Karl Dickey "Koley" Kolseth (December 25, 1892 – May 3, 1956) was an American Major League Baseball first baseman who played for the Baltimore Terrapins of the Federal League in 1915.

He began his professional career with the Lawrence Barristers of the class B New England League in 1911. After his single season in the major leagues, he returned to minor league baseball with the Chambersburg Maroons of the class D Blue Ridge League in 1916. His last minor league season was with the Easton Farmers of the Eastern Shore League in 1926. Overall, he had a .292 batting average in the minors, with his single best season batting average being .333 with Hanover and Waynesboro of the Blue Ridge League in 1920.
