= George Suggs =

American baseball player (1882–1949)

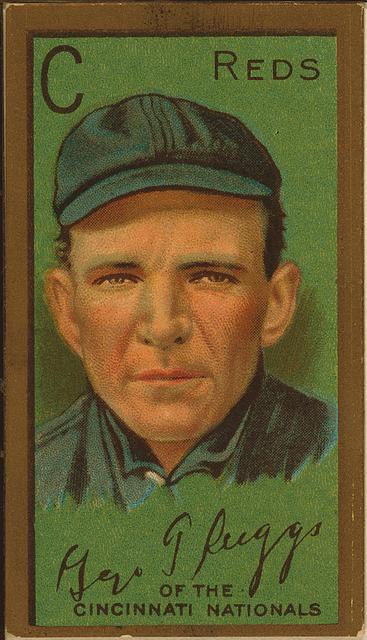
- Pitcher
- Born: July 7, 1882; Kinston, North Carolina, U.S.
- Died: April 4, 1949 (aged 66); Kinston, North Carolina, U.S.
- Batted: Right Threw: Right

MLB debut
- April 21, 1908, for the Detroit Tigers

Last MLB appearance
- September 18, 1915, for the Baltimore Terrapins

MLB statistics
- Win–loss record: 99–91
- Earned run average: 3.11
- Strikeouts: 588
- Stats at Baseball Reference

Teams
- Detroit Tigers (1908–1909); Cincinnati Reds (1910–1913); Baltimore Terrapins (1914–1915)

George Franklin Suggs (July 7, 1882 – April 4, 1949) was an American major league baseball pitcher.

On September 8, 1906, Suggs, pitching for the Southern Association's Memphis Egyptians, pitched an 11-inning no-hitter against the Nashville Baseball Club at Athletic Park in Nashville. He struck out six batters in the first game of a doubleheader, a 1–0 win.

Suggs made his major league debut on April 21, 1908, for the Detroit Tigers. Besides playing for Detroit (1908–09), Suggs also played for the Cincinnati Reds (1910–13) and the Federal League Baltimore Terrapins (1914–15). Suggs led the National League in the fewest Bases on balls per 9 innings pitched in 1910 and as of June 2012 is ranked 76th on the all-time list in that category. He was a two-time twenty game winner (1910, 1914) and came just one win shy of the mark in 1912. Suggs finished his career with a 3.11 ERA and 99 wins.

As a hitter, Suggs was above average for a pitcher, posting a .204 batting average (112-for-549) with 47 runs, 1 home run, 47 RBI and 54 bases on balls. Defensively, he was above average, recording a .972 fielding percentage which was 24 points higher than the league average at his position.

Following his retirement from major league baseball, Suggs took a very active role in promoting baseball in his hometown of Kinston, North Carolina. He managed two independent (known then as "outlaw") teams in Kinston, the Kinston Robins and the Kinston Highwaymen. He was also the designer of their stadium, West End Park, which was modified in 1925 for the Virginia League Kinston Eagles. He was one of the initial inductees in the Kinston Professional Baseball Hall of Fame on February 11, 1983.

== Sources ==
- Career statistics from Baseball Reference · Baseball Reference (Minors) · Retrosheet · Baseball Almanac
