= Kaiser Wilhelm (baseball) =

American baseball player and manager (1874–1936)

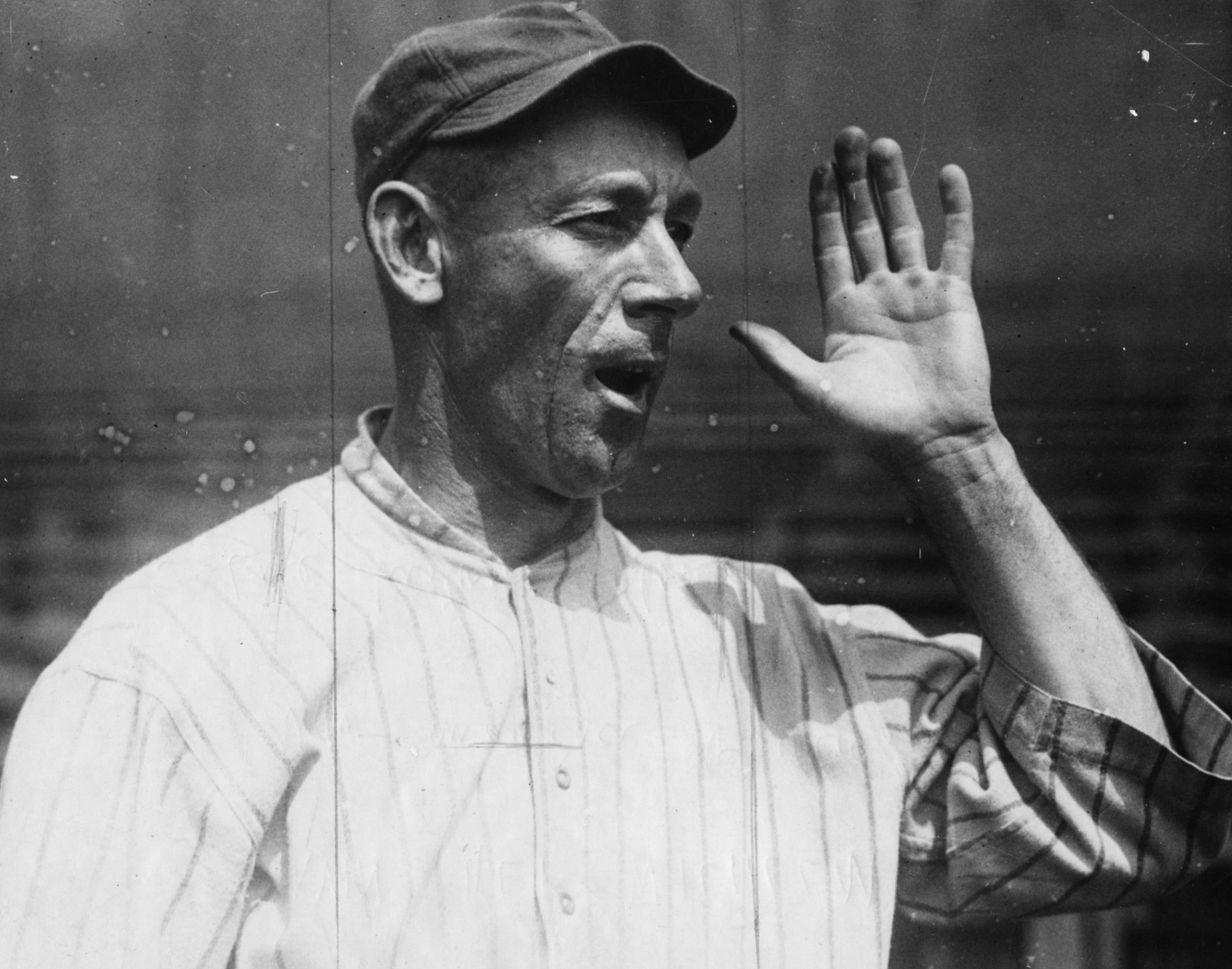
- Pitcher / Manager
- Born: January 26, 1874; Wooster, Ohio, U.S.
- Died: May 22, 1936 (aged 62); Rochester, New York, U.S.
- Batted: Right Threw: Right

MLB debut
- April 18, 1903, for the Pittsburgh Pirates

Last MLB appearance
- August 21, 1921, for the Philadelphia Phillies

MLB statistics
- Win–loss record: 56–105
- Earned run average: 3.44
- Strikeouts: 444
- Managerial record: 108–199
- Winning %: .352
- Stats at Baseball Reference

Teams
- As player: Pittsburgh Pirates (1903); Boston Beaneaters (1904–1905); Brooklyn Superbas (1908–1910); Baltimore Terrapins (1914–1915); Philadelphia Phillies (1921); As manager: Philadelphia Phillies (1921–1922)

Irvin Key "Kaiser" Wilhelm (Note: Wilhelm is variously referred to in news accounts as Irvin, Irving, Kaiser and Kize.) (January 26, 1874 – May 22, 1936) (Note: Baseball Reference shows the date of birth as January 26, 1874, but a 1900 Wooster census shows a birth month of January 1877.) was an American pitcher and manager in Major League Baseball. Between 1903 and 1914, he moved between the major and minor leagues several times. He played with the Pittsburgh Pirates, Boston Beaneaters, Brooklyn Superbas and Baltimore Terrapins. After 1914, Wilhelm spent time as a player, manager and scout for the minor leagues. In 1921, he became the manager for the Philadelphia Phillies and pitched in four games for the team.

Wilhelm held the minor league baseball pitching record for consecutive scoreless innings for 97 years, but was not recognized as the record holder by baseball officials until 2004. Baseball officials declared Wilhelm the record holder a few days before Brad Thompson was thought to have broken the record. Two days after Wilhelm's streak was thought to have been broken, The New York Times reported a historian found three scoreless innings which were previously left off Wilhelm's streak, indicating his record had not actually been broken. Wilhelm is still the current record holder.

== Early life ==
Wilhelm was born in Wooster, Ohio, to Joseph H. and Celia P. DeMiller Wilhelm. His father had found work as a painter, blacksmith and house decorator. Wilhelm attended Wooster High School; the school did not have a baseball team. He entered professional baseball in 1895 with the Mansfield Kids.

== Career ==
While pitching for the Birmingham Barons in 1902, Wilhelm threw back-to-back one-hit games. This attracted the attention of Pittsburgh Pirates owner Barney Dreyfuss, who invited Wilhelm to spring training with the Pirates in 1903. Wilhelm appeared in 12 games that year for the Pirates, finishing with a 5–3 win–loss record. He played with the Boston Beaneaters in the next two seasons. In 1904, Wilhelm earned a 14–20 record and gave up a league-high 118 earned runs. The next year he gave up 122 earned runs, second highest in the league, and finished with a 3–23 record. Wilhelm became commonly known as "Kaiser" during his career, a nickname which originated from the early 20th century German emperor Wilhelm II.

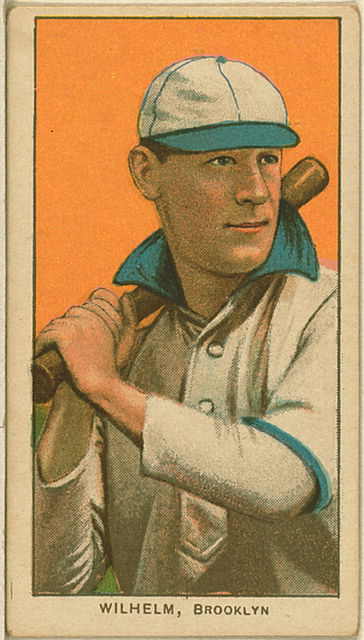
A 1909 baseball card of Wilhelm produced by the American Tobacco Company.

Playing with the Barons in 1906, Wilhelm pitched the team's first perfect game since its founding in 1884. The 1906 Barons won the team's first title since joining the Southern Association in 1901. His record that year was 22–13. He had similar success the following year, finishing 23–14. Wilhelm returned to the major leagues with the Brooklyn Superbas from 1908 to 1910. His most notable game from that period may have been a three-hit, thirteen-inning win on Opening Day 1909; opposing pitcher Red Ames had a no-hitter going into the tenth inning. In his three seasons with Brooklyn, he registered a 22–42 record.

Wilhelm was back in the minor leagues with Rochester in 1911. In three seasons with Rochester, he won 48 games and lost 24 games. Before the 1914 baseball season, Wilhelm was signed by the Baltimore Terrapins of the Federal League (FL). In 1915, the new Colonial League emerged with backing from the FL. An agreement between the leagues provided each Colonial League team with six FL players; the FL received $200 per month for each player sent to the new league. When ordered to the new league by FL officials, Wilhelm refused to report. Instead, he was made an FL umpire.

In 1916, Wilhelm sued the Terrapins on the grounds he had signed a three-year contract in 1914 worth $10,500 and was not allowed to continue with the team after July 1, 1915. Wilhelm spent the 1916 and 1917 seasons with the Elmira Colonels of the New York State League. In those two seasons, he finished 14–19 and 17–16 respectively. Wilhelm pitched for the Jersey City Skeeters of the International League in 1920. That year he was the winning pitcher of both games of a doubleheader, leading the team to 7–3 and 10–0 wins.

Wilhelm became manager of the Philadelphia Phillies during the 1921 season. In early September, The New York Times criticized Wilhelm's team after losing both games of a doubleheader, saying that "Every day is Labor Day for the Phillies... The Quakers were in perfect stride during both contests and demonstrated they can lose as easily and dexterously on a holiday as on any other occasion." Wilhelm had become the interim manager earlier in the season after Wild Bill Donovan was called as a witness in the trial surrounding the Black Sox Scandal. Wilhelm was discharged from his position in late 1922. Wilhelm's managerial record was 83–137 in Philadelphia, which included 96 losses in 1922.

In 1923, Wilhelm made his final professional appearance as a player, taking part in a single game with the Rochester Tribe. He then managed the Bridgeport Bears in 1925. In the summer of 1928, Wilhelm took a position as scout for the Montreal Royals. In 1930, he was the head baseball coach at the University of Rochester. Wilhelm died in 1936 and a benefit minor league game was held in Rochester to assist his widow.

== Scoreless innings streak ==
While playing in the minor leagues in 1907, Wilhelm pitched a long streak of consecutive innings without giving up a run. In May 2004, pitcher Brad Thompson was approaching the minor league record for this statistical category, by this time thought by the National Association of Professional Baseball Leagues (NAPBL) to belong to Urban Shocker. Shocker threw 54 consecutive scoreless innings in 1916. A May 16 Associated Press article said the NAPBL took a further look at its records and recognized Wilhelm held the record, having thrown 56 consecutive scoreless innings in 1907. On May 19, 2004, Thompson took his streak to 57 innings before he gave up a run.

Two days after Thompson was thought to have broken the record, The New York Times published an article indicating three innings had been previously left off Wilhelm's scoreless innings streak, meaning Wilhelm should still hold the record for the longest such streak in the minor leagues—59 innings. The omitted innings had been discovered by Dave Chase, who was a baseball historian and a minor league general manager for the Memphis Redbirds. Baseball researcher Ray Nemec later found Wilhelm had come up to the major leagues with his streak intact, then returned to the minor leagues in 1911 and pitched 13 more consecutive scoreless innings. This took Wilhelm's minor league consecutive scoreless innings streak to 72.

According to research by Walter Johnson's biographer, the actual record should be 77, from Johnson's 1907 season with the Weiser Kids of the Idaho State League.

== See also ==
- List of Major League Baseball player–managers

== Notes ==
Sporting positions
Preceded by Nap Rucker	Brooklyn Superbas Opening Day; Starting pitcher 1909	Succeeded by Nap Rucker
