= Enos Kirkpatrick =

American baseball player (1884–1964)

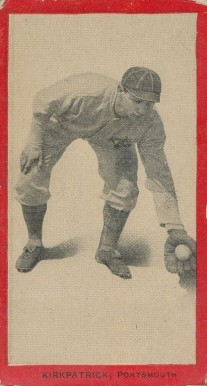
- Third baseman
- Born: December 9, 1884; Pittsburgh, Pennsylvania, U.S.
- Died: April 14, 1964 (aged 79); Pittsburgh, Pennsylvania, U.S.
- Batted: Right Threw: Right

MLB debut
- August 24, 1912, for the Brooklyn Dodgers

Last MLB appearance
- September 16, 1915, for the Baltimore Terrapins

MLB statistics
- Batting average: .237
- Home runs: 3
- Runs batted in: 46
- Stats at Baseball Reference

Teams
- Brooklyn Dodgers/Superbas (1912–1913); Baltimore Terrapins (1914–1915)

Enos Claire Kirkpatrick (December 9, 1884 – April 14, 1964) was an American third baseman in Major League Baseball who played from 1912 through 1915 for the Brooklyn Dodgers and the Baltimore Terrapins. He went to college at Duquesne University.
