= Harry Swacina =

American baseball player (1881–1944)

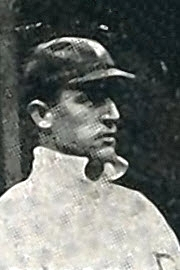
- First baseman
- Born: August 22, 1881; St. Louis, Missouri, U.S.
- Died: June 21, 1944 (aged 62); Birmingham, Alabama, U.S.
- Batted: Right Threw: Right

MLB debut
- September 13, 1907, for the Pittsburgh Pirates

Last MLB appearance
- August 26, 1915, for the Baltimore Terrapins

MLB statistics
- Batting average: .256
- Home runs: 1
- Runs batted in: 151
- Stats at Baseball Reference

Teams
- Pittsburgh Pirates (1907–1908); Baltimore Terrapins (1914–1915)

Harry Joseph Swacina (August 22, 1881 – June 21, 1944) was an American professional baseball first baseman. Nicknamed "Swats", he played four seasons in Major League Baseball between 1907 and 1914.

== Career ==
Swacina began his professional career in 1901 with the minor league Memphis Egyptians of the Southern Association. He was playing for the Peoria Distillers of the Three-I League in 1907 when he was picked up by the Pittsburgh Pirates. He was inserted as the regular first baseman in mid-September, replacing the departed Jim Nealon, and batted .200 in 26 games.

Swacina returned to the Pirates in 1908, where he split time at first base with Alan Storke and Jim Kane. In August, his contract was sold to the Louisville Colonels, and he spent the next several years back in the minor leagues, including a stint as player-manager with the Mobile Sea Gulls in 1911.

In 1914, the creation of the Federal League offered Swacina the opportunity to return to the majors. That season, he served as the regular first baseman for the Baltimore Terrapins. In 1915, he split the first base duties for the Terrapins with Joe Agler.

When the Federal League folded after the season, Swacina again returned to the minor leagues. He continued to play professionally until 1923, a season which he split between the Jackson Senators of the Cotton States League and the Greenville Spinners of the South Atlantic League.

== Sources ==
- Career statistics from Baseball Reference · Baseball Reference (Minors) · Retrosheet · Baseball Almanac
