= Jack McCandless =

American baseball player (1891-1961)

- Outfielder
- Born: May 5, 1891; Pittsburgh, Pennsylvania, U.S.
- Died: August 17, 1961 (aged 70); Pittsburgh, Pennsylvania, U.S.
- Batted: Left Threw: Right

MLB debut
- September 10, 1914, for the Baltimore Terrapins

Last MLB appearance
- October 3, 1915, for the Baltimore Terrapins

MLB statistics
- Batting average: .217
- Home runs: 5
- Runs batted in: 35
- Stats at Baseball Reference

Teams
- Baltimore Terrapins (1914–1915)

Scott Cook "Jack" McCandless (May 5, 1891 – August 17, 1961) was an American Major League Baseball outfielder who played for the Baltimore Terrapins of the Federal League in 1914 and 1915.
