= Wally Reinecker =

American baseball player

- Third baseman
- Born: April 21, 1890; Pittsburgh, Pennsylvania, U.S.
- Died: April 18, 1957 (aged 66); Pittsburgh, Pennsylvania, U.S.
- Batted: Right Threw: Right

MLB debut
- September 17, 1915, for the Baltimore Terrapins

Last MLB appearance
- October 18, 1915, for the Baltimore Terrapins

MLB statistics
- Games: 3
- At bats: 8
- Hit(s): 1
- Stats at Baseball Reference

Teams
- Baltimore Terrapins (1915)

Walter Joseph Reinecker (April 12, 1890 – April 18, 1957), born Walter Joseph Smith, was an American Major League Baseball third baseman who played for the Baltimore Terrapins of the Federal League in 1915.
