= Hack Simmons =

American baseball player (1885–1942)

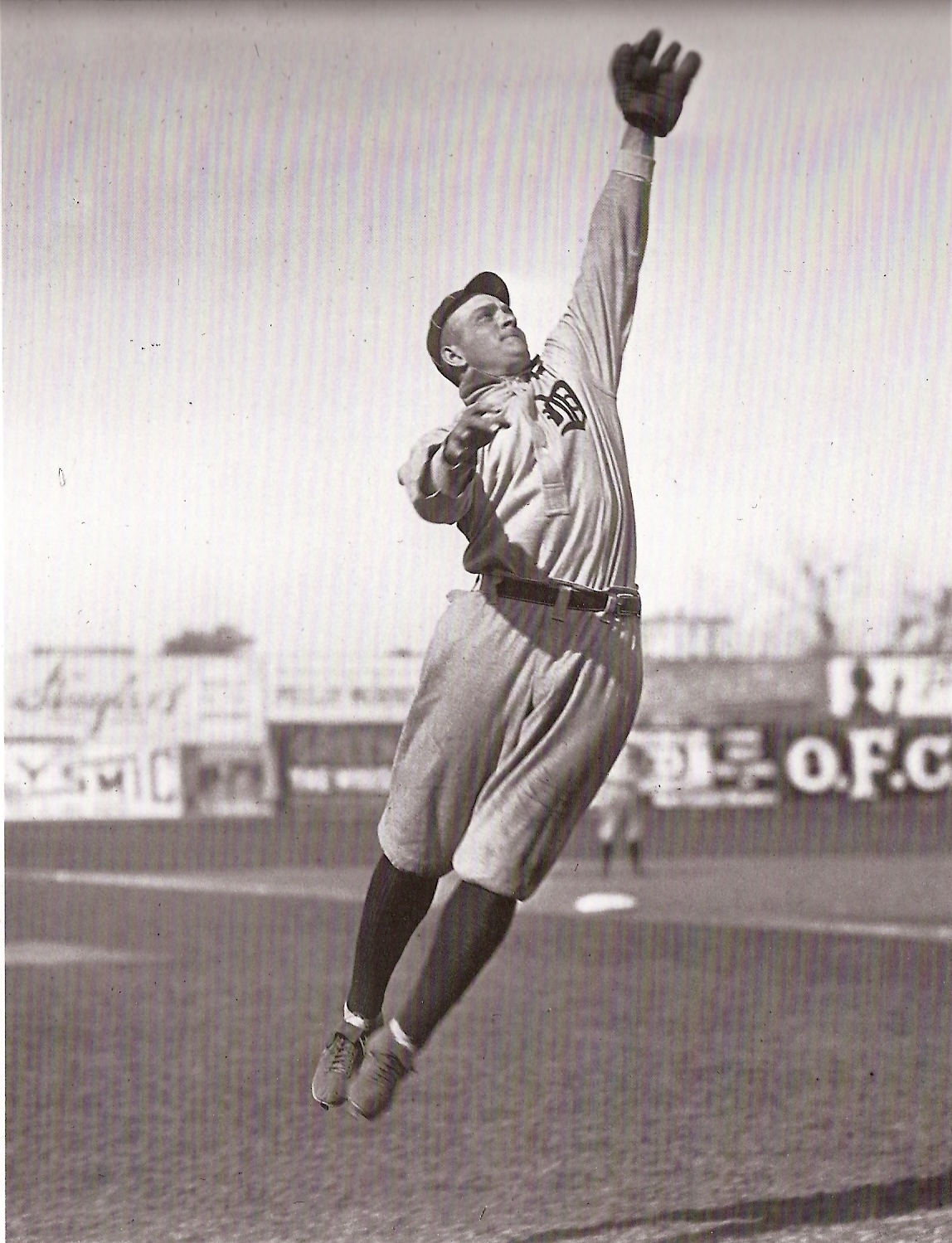
- Hack Simmons, Detroit Tigers
- Second baseman / Outfielder
- Born: January 29, 1885; Brooklyn, New York, U.S.
- Died: April 26, 1942 (aged 57); Arverne, Queens, New York, U.S.
- Batted: Right Threw: Right

MLB debut
- April 15, 1910, for the Detroit Tigers

Last MLB appearance
- June 30, 1915, for the Baltimore Terrapins

MLB statistics
- Batting average: .246
- Hits: 234
- On-base percentage: .246
- Stats at Baseball Reference

Teams
- Detroit Tigers (1910); New York Highlanders (1912); Baltimore Terrapins (1914–1915)

George Washington "Hack" Simmons (January 29, 1885 – April 26, 1942) was an American baseball player. He played professional baseball for between 1906 and 1917, including four seasons in Major League Baseball with the Detroit Tigers (1910) and New York Highlanders (1912), both of the American League, and the Baltimore Terrapins (1914–1915) of the Federal League.

== Early years ==
Simmons was born in Brooklyn, New York, in 1885.

== Professional baseball ==
Simmons began his professional baseball career playing in the minor leagues for the Montreal Royals in 1906, the Dayton Veterans in 1907, the New Haven Blues in 1908, and the Rochester Bronchos in 1909.

In April 1910, Simmons had his debut in Major League Baseball with the Detroit Tigers. He appeared in 42 games with the Tigers, 22 of them as a first baseman, and compiled a .227 batting average and .303 on-base percentage. On May 4, 1910, Simmons initiated a triple play when he caught a line drive off the bat of Billy Purtell, touched first base to double up the runner leading off, and threw to Donie Bush who was covering second base.

After making his debut with the Tigers in 1910, Simmons returned to Rochester later that season and remained there through the 1911 season. In 1912, he played for the New York Highlanders (later renamed the Yankees). He appeared in 110 games for New York, 88 of those as a second baseman, and compiled a .239 batting average and .308 on-base percentage.

Simmons returned again to Rochester for the 1913 season. He then joined the Baltimore Terrapins of the Federal League. He appeared in 153 games for the Terrapins in 1914 and 1915, 74 as a left fielder and 39 as a second baseman. He compiled a .257 batting average and .331 on-base percentage in two seasons with the Terrapins. He appeared in his last major league game on June 30, 1915, and was released by the Terrapins on July 11, 1915.

In all four of his major league seasons, Simmons appeared in 305 games, 127 at second base, 88 in the outfield, 39 at first base, eight at third base, and six at shortstop. He compiled a career batting average of .246 with 234 hits, 115 runs scored, 102 RBIs, 85 walks, 43 doubles, 28 stolen bases, nine triples, and two home runs.

== Later years ==
After retiring from professional baseball, Simmons continued to play semi-pro baseball in Brooklyn. He was employed for nearly 25 years as a general inspector for the Brooklyn-Manhattan Transit system starting in 1917. He was involved in an automobile accident in early 1942 and died in April 1942 at age 57 in Arverne, Queens in New York. The cause of death was heart disease.
