= Benny Meyer =

American baseball player (1885-1974)

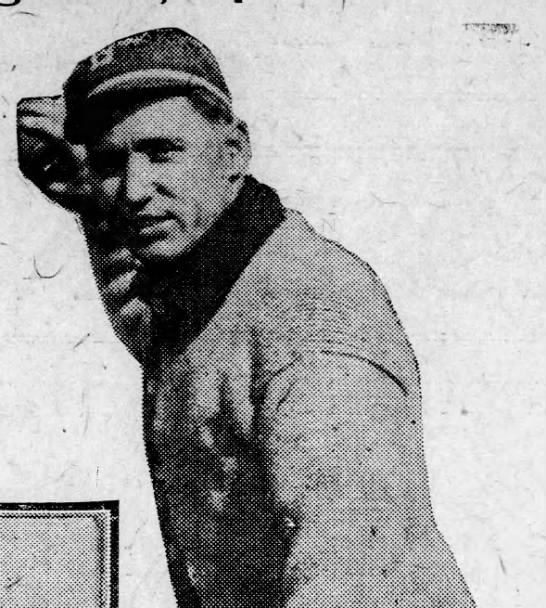
- Meyer in 1914
- Outfielder
- Born: January 21, 1885; Hematite, Missouri, U.S.
- Died: February 6, 1974 (aged 89); Festus, Missouri, U.S.
- Batted: Right Threw: Right

MLB debut
- April 9, 1913, for the Brooklyn Dodgers

Last MLB appearance
- September 22, 1925, for the Philadelphia Phillies

MLB statistics
- Batting average: .265
- Home runs: 7
- Runs batted in: 84
- Stats at Baseball Reference

Teams
- Brooklyn Dodgers (1913); Baltimore Terrapins (1914–1915); Buffalo Blues (1915); Philadelphia Phillies (1925)

Bernhard Meyer (January 21, 1885 – February 6, 1974), born in Hematite, Missouri, was an American baseball outfielder for the Brooklyn Dodgers (1913), Baltimore Terrapins (1914–15), Buffalo Blues (1915) and Philadelphia Phillies (1925).

In four seasons he played in 310 major league games and had 1,041 at bats, 146 runs, 276 hits, 29 doubles, 17 triples, 7 home runs, 84 RBIs, 46 stolen bases, 158 walks, .265 batting average, .365 on-base percentage, .346 slugging percentage, 360 total bases and 31 sacrifice hits.

After retiring as a player, he worked as a coach for the Philadelphia Phillies under manager Art Fletcher. He served as a non-playing captain in 1924. He coached with the Detroit Tigers under manager Bucky Harris. He developed a reputation for his loudness as a coach for Detroit and was the subject of an article in The Sporting Life in 1929. He managed the Grand Rapids Chicks in 1945.

He died in Festus, Missouri, at the age of 89.

== Sources ==
- Career statistics from Baseball Reference · Retrosheet · Baseball Almanac
