= Snipe Conley =

American baseball player (1892–1978)

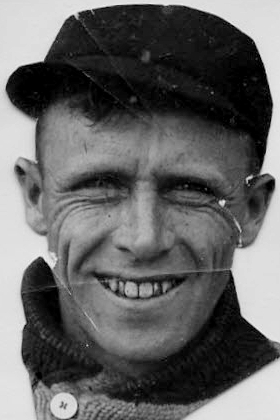
- Pitcher
- Born: April 25, 1892; Cressona, Pennsylvania, U.S.
- Died: January 5, 1978 (aged 83); Robert Lee, Texas, U.S.
- Batted: Right Threw: Right

MLB debut
- May 20, 1914, for the Baltimore Terrapins

Last MLB appearance
- May 10, 1918, for the Cincinnati Reds

MLB statistics
- Win–loss record: 7–10
- Strikeouts: 128
- Earned run average: 3.36
- Stats at Baseball Reference

Teams
- Baltimore Terrapins (1914–1915); Cincinnati Reds (1918)

James Patrick "Snipe" Conley (April 25, 1892 – January 5, 1978) was an American professional baseball pitcher. He played all or part of three seasons in Major League Baseball, for the Baltimore Terrapins of the Federal League in 1914 and 1915, and for the Cincinnati Reds in 1918. He continued to play in the minors until 1926, then came back at age 47 to pitch in two games for the minor league Dallas Rebels in 1941.

== Sources ==
- Career statistics from Baseball Reference · Baseball Reference (Minors) · Retrosheet · Baseball Almanac
