= Otto Knabe =

American baseball player (1884–1961)

- Second baseman
- Born: June 12, 1884; Carrick, Pennsylvania
- Died: May 17, 1961 (aged 76); Philadelphia, Pennsylvania
- Batted: Right Threw: Right

MLB debut
- October 3, 1905, for the Pittsburgh Pirates

Last MLB appearance
- September 25, 1916, for the Chicago Cubs

MLB statistics
- Games played: 1278
- Hits: 1103
- Batting average: .247
- Stats at Baseball Reference

Teams
- As player: Pittsburgh Pirates (1905); Philadelphia Phillies (1907–1913); Baltimore Terrapins (1914–1915); Pittsburgh Pirates (1916); Chicago Cubs (1916); As manager: Baltimore Terrapins (1914–1915)

Career highlights and awards
- Led the National League in Sacrifice Hits 4 times (1907–08, 1910 and 1913).; Philadelphia Phillies Career Leader in Sacrifice Hits (216).

Franz Otto Knabe (June 12, 1884 – May 17, 1961), also known as "Dutch", was an American Major league second baseman from Carrick, Pennsylvania, who played for four teams. Knabe received MVP votes in three-straight seasons, 1911-1913, as a member of the Philadelphia Phillies and during his time with the Phillies, he led the National League in sacrifice hits. He was the player-manager for the only two seasons the Baltimore Terrapins and the Federal League were in existence.

Knabe twice received a single vote for the Baseball Hall of Fame, once in 1939, and the other in 1946. He died in Philadelphia, Pennsylvania, and was interred at New Cathedral Cemetery.

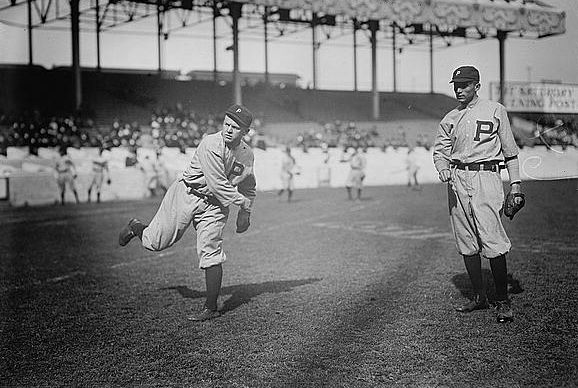
Knabe and Erskine Mayer (right), 1913

== See also ==
- List of Major League Baseball player–managers
