= Baltimore Terrapins =

Defunct Federal League baseball team

Information
- Location: Baltimore, Maryland
- Ballpark: Terrapin Park
- Founded: 1914
- Disbanded: 1915
- League championships: 0
- Former league: Federal League
- Ownership: Ned Hanlon
- Manager: Otto Knabe

The Baltimore Terrapins were a team in the short-lived Federal League of professional baseball from 1914 to 1915. Their brief existence led to litigation that led to an important legal precedent in baseball. The team played its home games at Terrapin Park.

== 1914 Baltimore Terrapins season ==
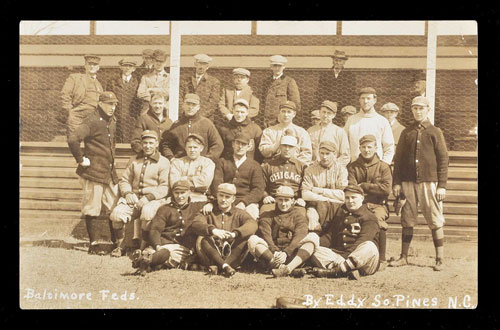
Baltimore Terrapins in March 1914 at Spring Training at Southern Pines Golf Club

Most of the professional baseball teams in Baltimore have been called the Orioles, in reference to the Baltimore oriole bird. There was already a minor league Baltimore Orioles, and the new Federal League club built their ballpark directly across the street from the Orioles park. The new club chose to call itself the Baltimore Terrapins, after the diamondback terrapin, the state reptile of Maryland. That nickname would later become primarily associated with the University of Maryland, College Park sports teams called the Maryland Terrapins.

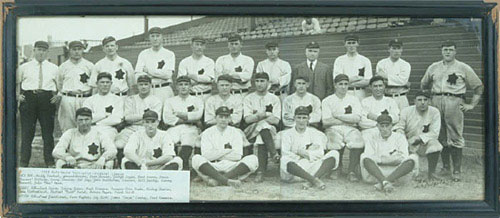
The 1914 Baltimore Terrapins

Baltimore gathered for spring training in Southern Pines, North Carolina at the Southern Pines Golf Club, previously used by the Philadelphia Phillies in 1909 and 1910. Terrapins manager Otto Knabe had played for these Phillies teams and trained in Southern Pines.

While the 1914 team posted a respectable 84–70 record and finished only 4½ games out of first place under player-manager Otto Knabe, the team was less than successful at the box office, even though four of the eight teams in the league (Chicago, Brooklyn, Pittsburgh, and St. Louis) were competing with one and even two (Chicago and St. Louis) other major league teams in the same cities.

== 1915 Baltimore Terrapins season ==
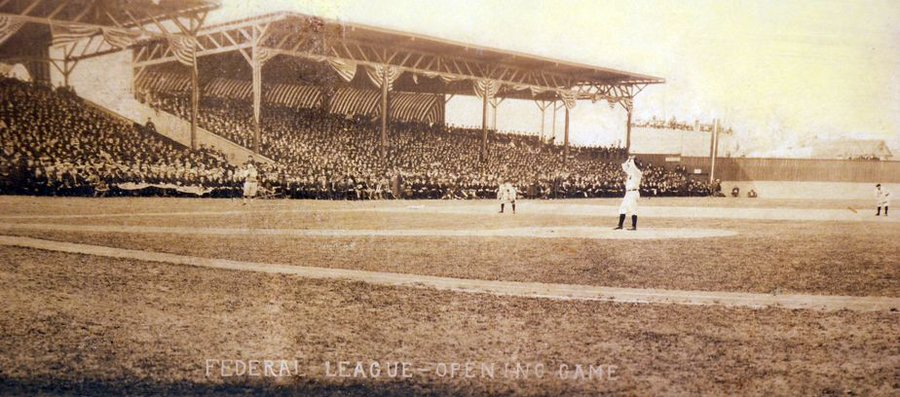
Baltimore Terrapins Opening Day at Terrapin Park on Apr 10, 1915 against the Newark Peppers

In an attempt to turn this situation around and attract a marquee player to help them at the box office, the 1915 team recruited Chief Bender of the American League champion Philadelphia Athletics. The Athletics had sold off several future Hall-of-Famers like Eddie Plank, Eddie Collins and Frank "Home Run" Baker after being swept by the surprising Boston Braves in the 1914 World Series.

Bender had come off an impressive 17–3 season where he compiled seven shutouts and a 2.26 ERA in 1914. However, his 1915 season at Baltimore was a low point of his Hall of Fame career when he slumped to a 4–16 record, no shutouts, and a 3.99 ERA. Baltimore's collapse to a 47–107 record, 40 games out of first, was overshadowed only by the collapse of Bender's former team who went from a 99–53 league championship season to a dismal 43–109 record, 58½ games out of first in 1915. Bender and the Baltimore Terrapins never made a full recovery from 1915.

The incident did show the Federal League could compete seriously with the National League and American League on a professional baseball level and led to the buy-out truce which ended the Federal League for good. However, the Baltimore team's owners were not offered a part in this buyout.

== Impact ==
When the Federal League started, the Terrapins severely cut into the minor league Baltimore Orioles' attendance, causing financial problems for the owner. As a result, several players, including the young left-handed pitcher Babe Ruth, were offered for sale to major league teams. Ruth's contract was purchased by the Boston Red Sox, after being turned down by Connie Mack and the Philadelphia Athletics. In 1914, Ruth began his career with the Red Sox of the rival American League. After the demise of the Federal League and the Terrapins, Baltimore would not see major league baseball again until 1954, when the former St. Louis Browns moved into town and became the present-day Baltimore Orioles.

As the Terrapins' owners were not offered any part of the buyout offer made to most Federal League teams by the American and National Leagues, they decided to sue, alleging that the buyout was in violation of the Sherman Antitrust Act. The resulting case led to the U.S. Supreme Court deciding that the scheduling and playing of "base ball games" did not constitute "interstate commerce" in any sense envisioned by the Framers of the United States Constitution; therefore, the Sherman Act and other federal laws and regulations did not apply to baseball. The case, Federal Baseball Club v. National League, was not ultimately decided until 1922.

The minor league Orioles moved into Terrapin Park, a wooden ballpark. This move began a chain of events which would eventually lead to the return of major league baseball to Baltimore.

== See also ==
- 1914 Baltimore Terrapins season
- 1915 Baltimore Terrapins season
- Baltimore Terrapins all-time roster
