= List of Major League Baseball players (D) =

The following is a list of Major League Baseball players, retired or active. As of the end of the 2011 season, there have been 864 players with a last name that begins with D who have been on a major league roster at some point.

== D ==
- Omar Daal
- John D'Acquisto
- Paul Dade
- John Dagenhard
- Bill Dahlen
- Con Daily
- Hugh Daily
- Bruce Dal Canton
- Pete Dalena
- Mark Dalesandro
- Bill Daley
- Bud Daley
- Pete Daley
- Dom Dallessandro
- Sun Daly
- Tom Daly (C)
- Tom Daly (IF)
- Jeff C. D'Amico
- Jeff M. D'Amico
- Johnny Damon
- Chuck Daniel
- Bert Daniels
- Charlie Daniels
- Jack Daniels
- Kal Daniels
- Law Daniels
- John Danks
- Harry Danning
- Jamie D'Antona
- Fats Dantonio
- Cliff Dapper
- Alvin Dark
- Dell Darling
- Ron Darling
- Mike Darr (OF)
- Mike Darr (P)
- Bobby Darwin
- Danny Darwin
- Jeff Darwin
- Jeff Datz
- Brian Daubach
- Jake Daubert
- Jack Daugherty
- Bob Daughters
- Darren Daulton
- Hooks Dauss
- Yo-Yo Davalillo
- Vic Davalillo
- Jeff DaVanon
- Jerry DaVanon
- Claude Davenport
- Jim Davenport
- Lum Davenport
- Mike Davey
- Bob Davidson
- Cleatus Davidson
- Dave Davidson
- Mark Davidson
- Ted Davidson
- Kyle Davies
- Alvin Davis
- Bob Davis (P)
- Bob Davis (C)
- Bud Davis
- Butch Davis
- Chili Davis
- Curt Davis
- Daisy Davis
- Dick Davis
- Doug Davis (IF)
- Doug Davis (P)
- Eric Davis
- George Davis (SS) β
- George Davis (P)
- Gerry Davis
- Glenn Davis
- Harry Davis (1895–1917)
- Harry Davis (1932–1937)
- Ike Davis (SS)
- Ike Davis (1B)
- Jim Davis
- Jody Davis
- Jumbo Davis
- Mark Davis (P)
- Mark Davis (OF)
- Mike Davis
- Rajai Davis
- Ron Davis (OF)
- Ron Davis (P)
- Russ Davis
- Tim Davis
- Tod Davis
- Tommy Davis
- Willie Davis
- Wade Davis (pitcher)
- Scott Ray Davison
- Bill Dawley
- Joey Dawley
- Andre Dawson β
- Joe Dawson
- Dewon Day
- Zach Day
- Brian Dayett
- Ken Dayley
- Roger Deago
- Shorty Dee
- Alejandro De Aza
- Jordan De Jong
- Eulogio de la Cruz
- Tommy de la Cruz
- Mike de la Hoz
- Roland de la Maza
- Jorge de la Rosa
- Luis de los Santos (1B)
- Luis De Los Santos (3B)
- Luis de los Santos (P)
- Ramón de los Santos
- Cot Deal
- Snake Deal
- Pat Dealy
- Dizzy Dean β
- Dory Dean
- Paul Dean
- Harry Deane
- Dennis DeBarr
- Dave DeBusschere
- Doug DeCinces
- George Decker
- Steve Decker
- Rod Dedeaux
- John Deering
- Tony DeFate
- Arturo DeFreites
- Mike DeGerick
- Herman Dehlman
- Jim Deidel
- Pep Deininger
- Mike DeJean
- David DeJesus
- Iván DeJesús
- José DeJesús
- Francisco de la Rosa
- Bobby Del Greco
- Garton del Savio
- Miguel del Toro
- Ed Delahanty β
- Frank Delahanty
- Jim Delahanty
- Joe Delahanty
- Tom Delahanty
- Manny Delcarmen
- José DeLeón
- Luis DeLeón
- Carlos Delgado
- Puchy Delgado
- Wilson Delgado
- David Dellucci
- Bert Delmas
- Joe DeMaestri
- Al Demaree
- Frank Demaree
- Chris Demaria
- Billy DeMars
- Larry Demery
- Don Demeter
- Gene DeMontreville
- Rick Dempsey
- Brian Denman
- Kyle Denney
- Don Dennis
- Jerry Denny
- John Denny
- Bucky Dent
- Sam Dente
- Jorge DePaula
- Julio DePaula
- Mark DeRosa
- Mike Derrick
- Gene Desautels
- Jim Deshaies
- Delino DeShields
- Jimmie DeShong
- Ian Desmond
- Elmer Dessens
- Bob Detherage
- Tom Dettore
- Ducky Detweiler
- Mel Deutsch
- Adrian Devine
- Joey Devine
- Mickey Devine
- Hal Deviney
- Doug DeVore
- Josh Devore
- Al DeVormer
- Mark Dewey
- Jeff DeWillis
- Alex Diaz
- Bo Díaz
- Carlos Diaz (C)
- Carlos Diaz (P)
- Edgar Díaz
- Edwin Díaz
- Einar Díaz
- Joselo Díaz
- Juan Díaz (first baseman)
- Juan Díaz (shortstop)
- Matt Diaz
- Mike Diaz
- Víctor Díaz
- Buttercup Dickerson
- Bill Dickey β
- George Dickey
- Emerson Dickman
- Murry Dickson
- Lance Dickson
- Walt Dickson
- Bob Didier
- Chuck Diering
- Dick Dietz
- Dutch Dietz
- Mike DiFelice
- Steve Dignan
- Gordon Dillard
- Steve Dillard
- Bob Dillinger
- Packy Dillon
- Dom DiMaggio
- Joe DiMaggio β
- Vince DiMaggio
- Kerry Dineen
- Craig Dingman
- Bill Dinneen
- Ron Diorio
- Bob DiPietro
- Art Ditmar
- Ken Dixon
- Tom Dixon
- Greg Dobbs
- Ray Dobens
- Joe Dobson
- Pat Dobson
- Larry Doby β
- George Dockins
- Sam Dodge
- Pat Dodson
- Fred Doe
- Bobby Doerr β
- John Doherty (1B)
- John Doherty (P)
- Scott Dohmann
- Cozy Dolan (RF)
- Cozy Dolan (LF)
- John Dolan
- Lester Dole
- Andy Dominique
- Deacon Donahue
- Jim Donahue
- John Donahue
- Red Donahue
- Tim Donahue
- Atley Donald
- John Donaldson
- Josh Donaldson
- Augie Donatelli
- Mike Donlin
- James Donnelly
- Jim Donnelly
- Pete Donnelly
- Chris Donnels
- Pete Donohue
- Tom Donohue
- Bill Donovan (1898–1918 P)
- Bill Donovan (1942–43 P)
- Dick Donovan
- Jerry Donovan
- Mike Donovan
- Patsy Donovan
- Tom Donovan
- Bill Doran
- Tom Doran
- Jerry Dorgan
- Mike Dorgan
- Bert Dorr
- Jim Dorsey
- Herm Doscher
- Jack Doscher
- Richard Dotson
- Jim Dougherty
- Klondike Douglass
- Ryan Doumit
- Dennis Dove
- John Dowd
- Tommy Dowd
- Tom Dowse
- Brian Doyle
- Carl Doyle
- Danny Doyle
- Denny Doyle
- Jack Doyle
- Jacob Doyle
- Jeff Doyle
- Jess Doyle
- Jim Doyle
- Larry Doyle
- Paul Doyle
- Slow Joe Doyle
- D. J. Dozier
- Doug Drabek
- Moe Drabowsky
- Dick Drago
- Brian Drahman
- Logan Drake
- Mike Draper
- Dave Dravecky
- Tom Drees
- Darren Dreifort
- Clem Dreisewerd
- Bill Drescher
- Ryan Drese
- Chuck Dressen
- Kirk Dressendorfer
- Rob Dressler
- Cameron Drew
- J. D. Drew
- Tim Drew
- Frank Drews
- Karl Drews
- Dan Driessen
- Denny Driscoll
- Jim Driscoll
- Travis Driskill
- Walt Dropo
- Dick Drott
- Keith Drumright
- Don Drysdale β
- Rob Ducey
- Justin Duchscherer
- Brandon Duckworth
- John Dudra
- Charlie Duffee
- Chris Duffy
- Danny Duffy
- Frank Duffy
- Hugh Duffy β
- Joe Dugan
- Gus Dugas
- Oscar Dugey
- Jim Duggan
- Bill Duggleby
- Zach Duke
- Elijah Dukes
- Jan Dukes
- Bob Duliba
- George Dumont
- Dan Dumoulin
- Nick Dumovich
- Tom Dunbar
- Chris Duncan
- Courtney Duncan
- Dave Duncan
- Jeff Duncan
- Mariano Duncan
- Pat Duncan
- Shelley Duncan
- Vern Duncan
- Ed Dundon
- Davey Dunkle
- Bill Dunlap
- Fred Dunlap
- Grant Dunlap
- Adam Dunn
- Jack Dunn
- Scott Dunn
- Steve Dunn (1884)
- Steve Dunn (1990s)
- Todd Dunn
- Mike Dunne
- Shawon Dunston
- Dan Duran
- Chad Durbin
- Ryne Duren
- Ed Durham
- Leon Durham
- Ray Durham
- Bobby Durnbaugh
- Leo Durocher β
- Red Durrett
- Cedric Durst
- Jesse Duryea
- Bill Duzen
- Mike Duvall
- Frank Dwyer
- Jim Dwyer
- Jerry Dybzinski
- Jim Dyck
- Jermaine Dye
- Ben Dyer
- Duffy Dyer
- Mike Dyer
- Jimmy Dykes
- Lenny Dykstra
