= Delahanty =

Delahanty is a family name. Notable people with the surname include:

- Dolores Delahanty, American civil rights activist
- Ed Delahanty, American Major League Baseball left fielder
- Frank Delahanty, American Major League Baseball left fielder
- Jim Delahanty, American Major League Baseball second baseman
- Joe Delahanty, American Major League Baseball left fielder
- Ray Delahanty, American urban planner and YouTuber
- Thomas Delahanty, American police officer
- Thomas E. Delahanty, American justice of the Maine Supreme Judicial Court
- Thomas E. Delahanty II, American United States Attorney for the District of Maine
- Tom Delahanty, American Major League Baseball third baseman
