= Philadelphia Phillies all-time roster (D) =

List of baseball players

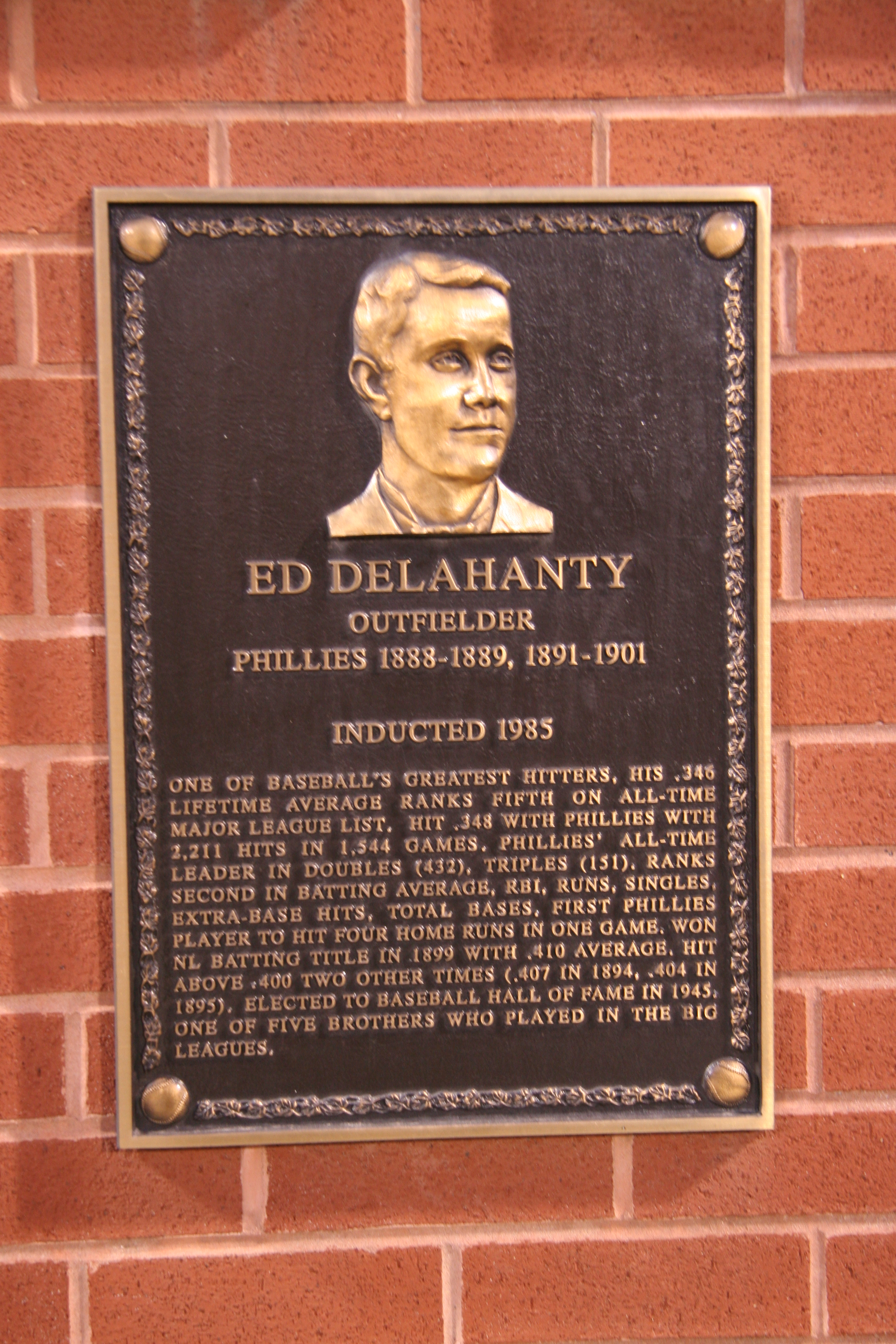
Ed Delahanty, a Hall of Fame outfielder, holds franchise records for the most career doubles and triples, feats which contributed to his election to the Philadelphia Baseball Wall of Fame (plaque pictured).

The Philadelphia Phillies are a Major League Baseball team based in Philadelphia, Pennsylvania. They are a member of the Eastern Division of Major League Baseball's National League. The team has played officially under two names since beginning play in 1883: the current moniker, as well as the "Quakers", which was used in conjunction with "Phillies" during the team's early history. The team was also known unofficially as the "Blue Jays" during the World War II era. Since the franchise's inception, 2,081 players have made an appearance in a competitive game for the team, whether as an offensive player (batting and baserunning) or a defensive player (fielding, pitching, or both).

Of those 2,081 Phillies, 99 have had surnames beginning with the letter D. Two of those players have been inducted into the Baseball Hall of Fame: outfielder Ed Delahanty, who played two stints for Philadelphia—from 1888 to 1889, and again from 1891 to 1901; and outfielder Hugh Duffy, who was a Phillie for three seasons (1904–1906) after being out of the major leagues for two years. The Hall of Fame lists the Phillies as Delahanty's primary team, and he is a member of the Philadelphia Baseball Wall of Fame, as is catcher Darren Daulton. Delahanty holds two franchise records, amassing 442 doubles and 157 triples to lead all Phillies in those categories. Pitcher Bill Duggleby also holds a record; he hit 81 batters in his eight-year career in Philadelphia.

Among the 60 batters in this list, outfielder Vern Duncan's .417 batting average is the highest mark; he amassed five hits in twelve plate appearances with Philadelphia. Other players with an average above .300 include Dick Davis (.311 in two seasons), Kiddo Davis (.302 in two seasons), Spud Davis (.321 in eight seasons), Delahanty (.348 in eleven seasons), Alexander Donoghue (.318 in one season), and George Durning (.357 in one season). Daulton's 134 home runs and Delahanty's 1,288 runs batted in lead all players whose surnames begin with D.

Of this list's 40 pitchers, Valerio de los Santos and Robert Dodd share the best win–loss record by winning percentage; each won one game while losing none. Duggleby's 90 wins and 99 losses are most among the members of this list, as are his 445 strikeouts. Dave Downs' 2.74 earned run average (ERA) in the only season of his career is the best mark in that category. Red Donahue is one of the ten Phillies pitchers who have thrown a no-hitter, accomplishing the feat on July 8, 1898.

One player, Ed Daily, has made 30% or more of his Phillies appearances as a pitcher and a position player. He amassed a 42–36 pitching record with a 2.77 ERA while batting .230 with six home runs as an outfielder.

Key to symbols in player list(s)
† or ‡	Indicates a member of the National Baseball Hall of Fame and Museum; ‡ indicates that the Phillies are the player's primary team^{[H]}
§	Indicates a member of the Philadelphia Baseball Wall of Fame
*	Indicates a team record^{[R]}
(#)	A number following a player's name indicates that the number was retired by the Phillies in the player's honor.
Year	Italic text indicates that the player is a member of the Phillies' active (25-man) roster.
Position(s)	Indicates the player's primary position(s)^{[P]}
Notes	Statistics shown only for playing time with Phillies^{[S]}
Ref	References

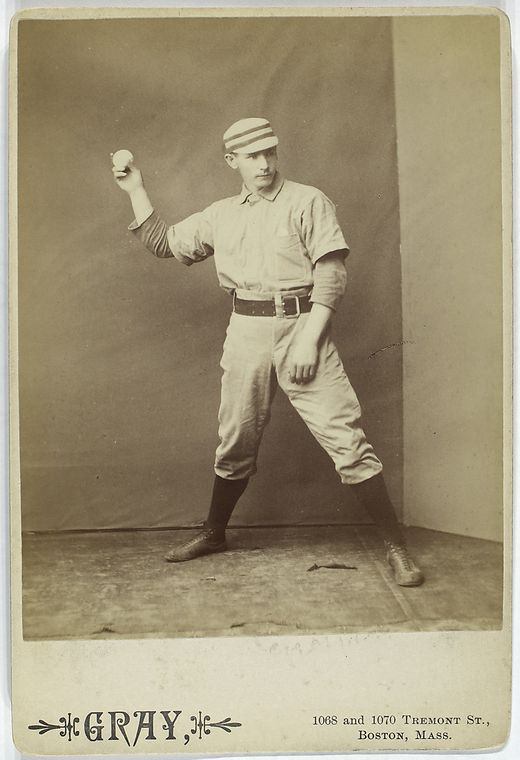
In three seasons as an outfielder and pitcher, Ed Daily won 42 games and hit 6 home runs.

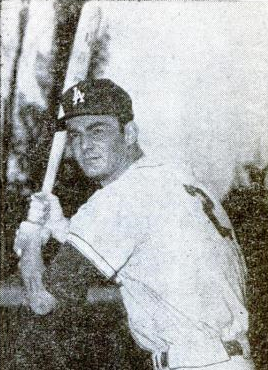
Don Demeter batted in 258 runs in three seasons with the Phillies.

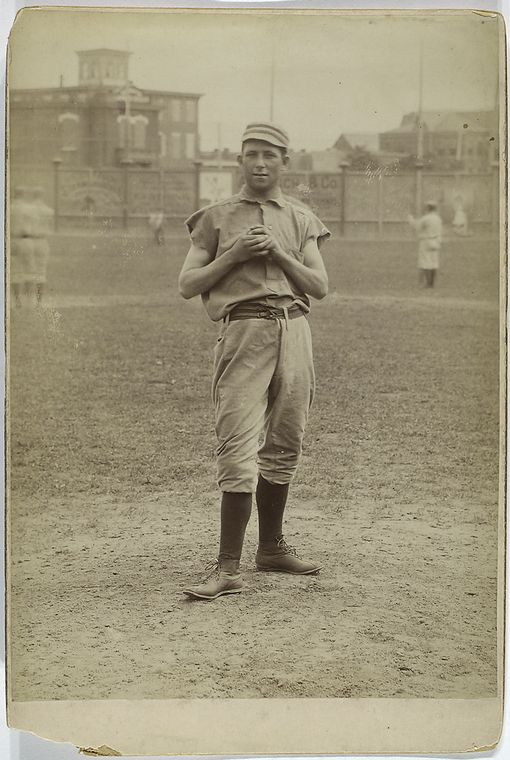
Pitcher Jim Devlin did not win a game during his career in Philadelphia.

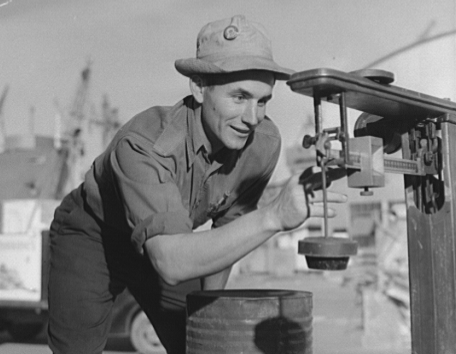
Vince DiMaggio, the oldest of the three DiMaggio brothers, hit 19 home runs in two seasons as the Phillies' center fielder.

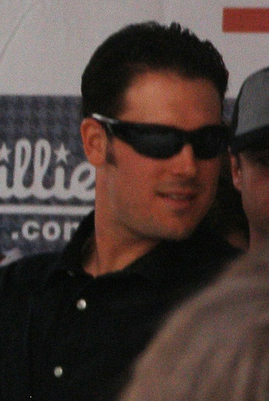
Greg Dobbs set a record for most pinch-hits by a Phillie in a single season in 2008.

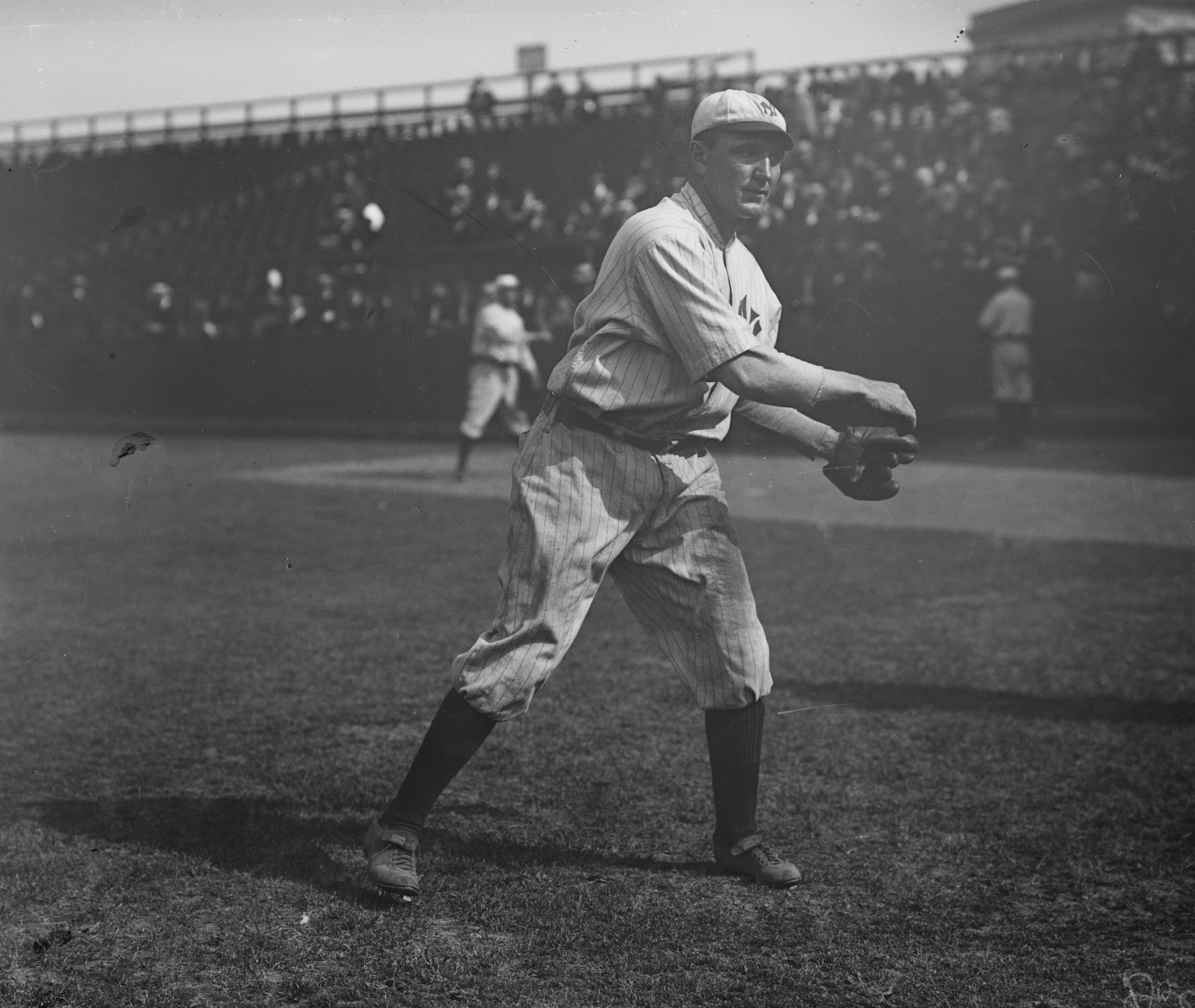
Cozy Dolan batted .267 in two seasons with the Phillies.

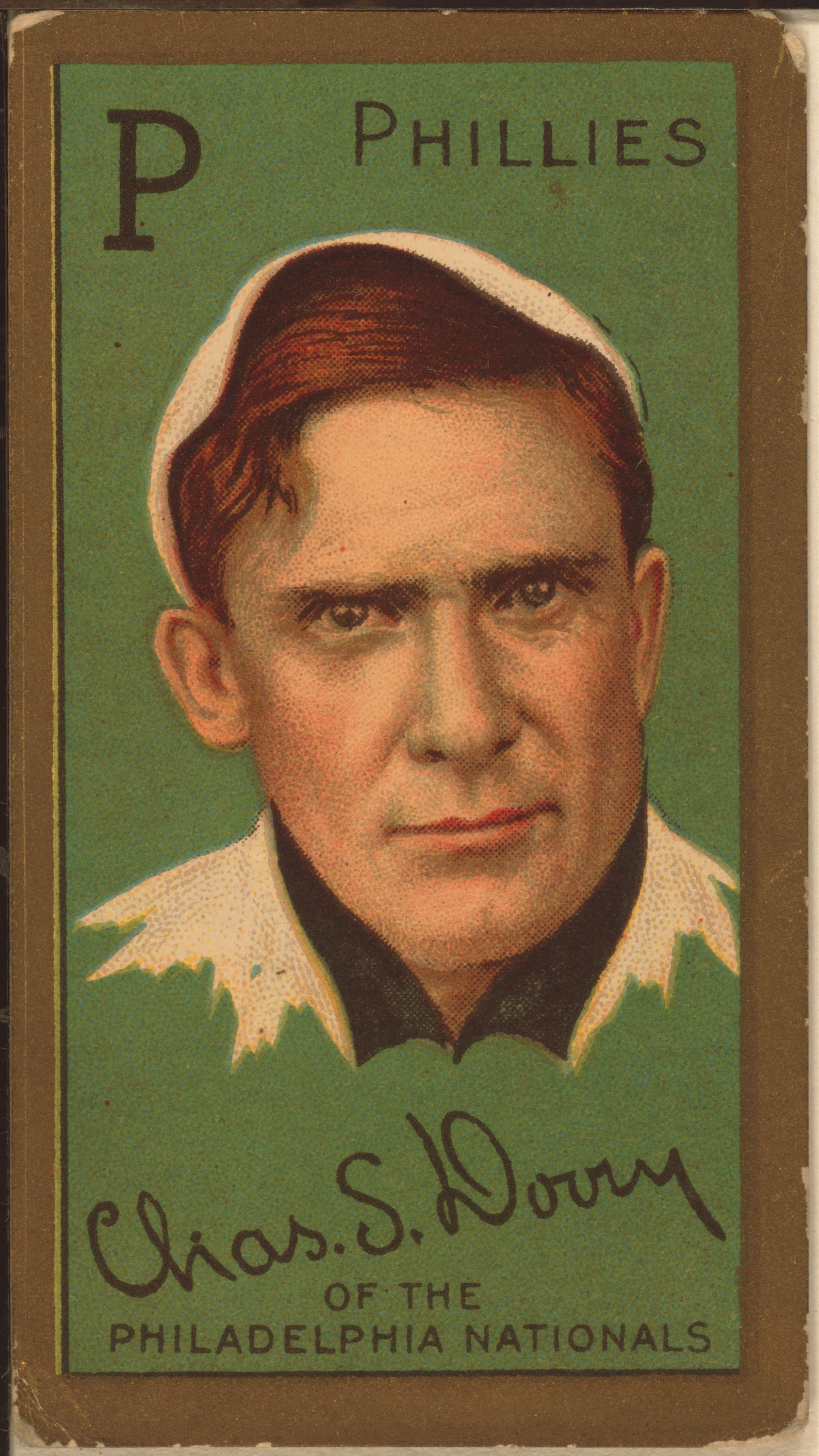
Red Dooin was Philadelphia's catcher for 13 seasons (1902–1914).

Hall of Famer Hugh Duffy, inducted as a manager, was an outfielder for the Phillies for three seasons.

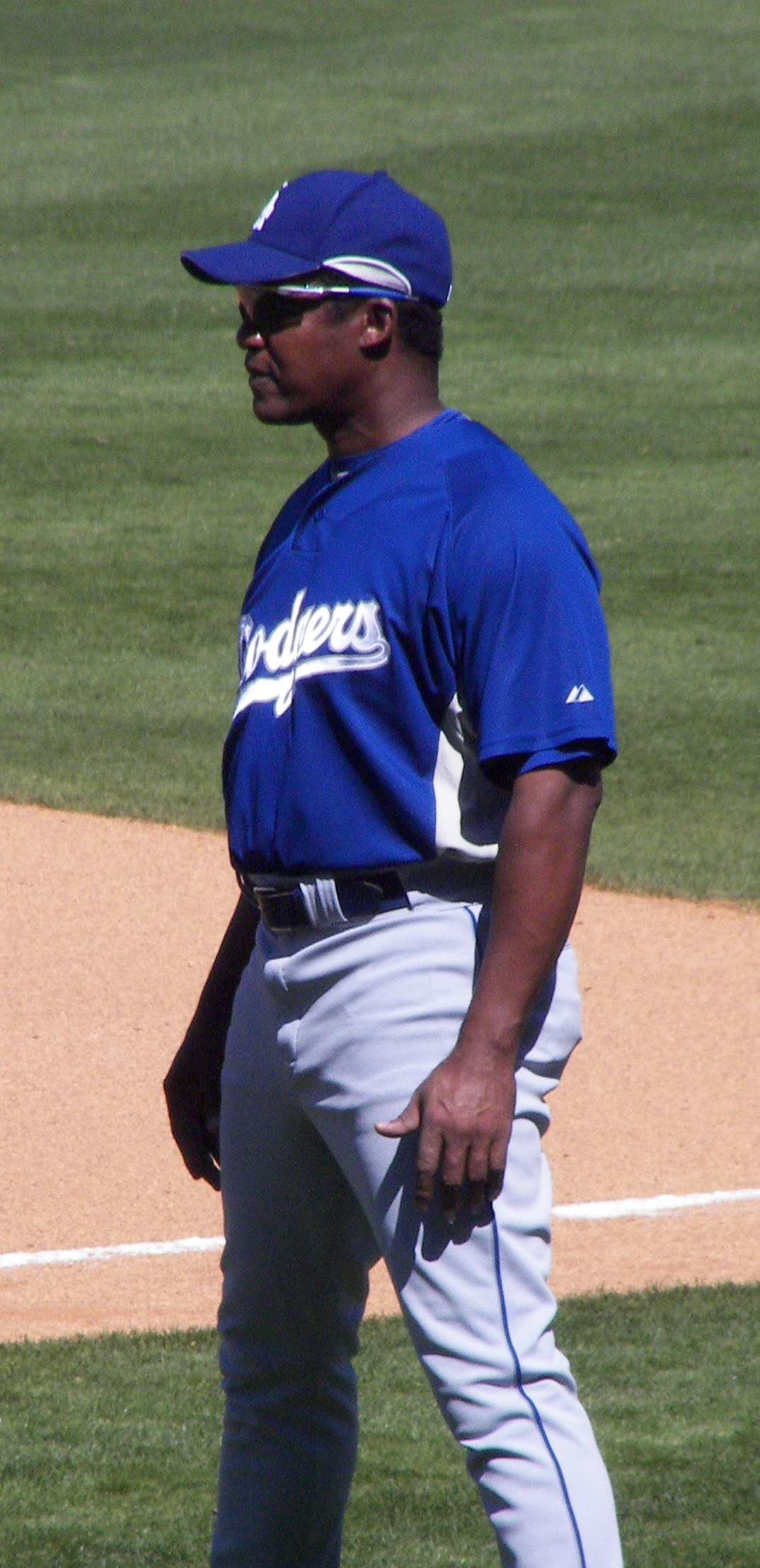
Mariano Duncan amassed a .274 batting average in four seasons as Philadelphia's shortstop and second baseman.

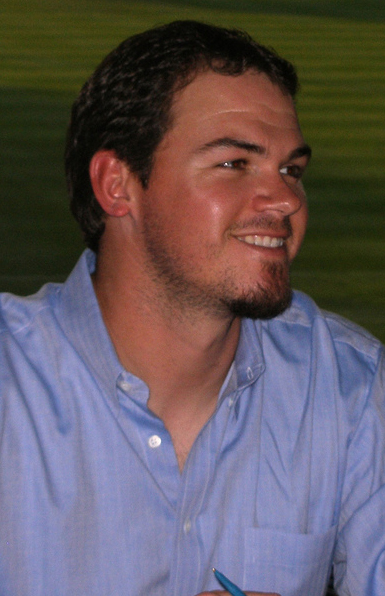
Chad Durbin pitched three seasons in the Phillies bullpen, winning 11 games and striking out 188.

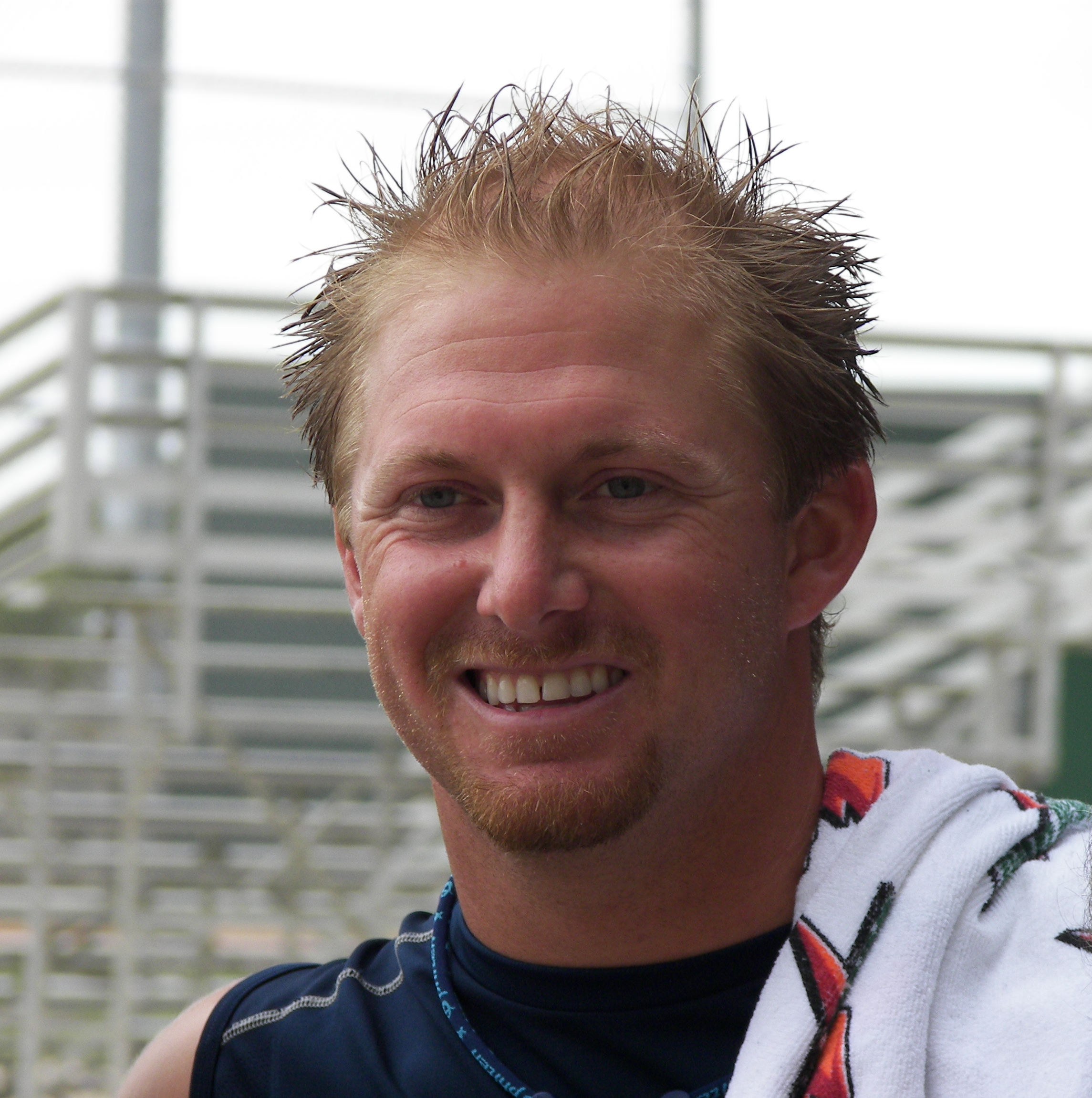
Pitcher J. D. Durbin won six games in his only season with Philadelphia.

List of players whose surnames begin with D, showing season(s) and position(s) played and selected statistics
Name	Season(s)	Position(s)	Notes	Ref
Omar Daal	2000–2001	Pitcher	15–16 record; 4.52 earned run average; 158 strikeouts	
Babe Dahlgren	1943	First baseman	.287 batting average; 5 home runs; 56 runs batted in	
David Dahl	2024 -Present	Outfielder	.600 batting average; 1 RBI; 1 runs batted in	
Sam Dailey	1929	Pitcher	2–2 record; 7.54 earned run average; 18 strikeouts	
Ed Daily	1885–1887	Outfielder; Pitcher	.230 batting average; 6 home runs; 42–36 record; 2.77 earned run average	
Clay Dalrymple	1960–1968	Catcher	.234 batting average; 50 home runs; 312 runs batted in	
Tony Daniels	1945	Second baseman	.200 batting average; 2 triples; 10 runs batted in	
Alvin Dark	1960	Third baseman	.242 batting average; 3 home runs; 14 runs batted in	
George Darrow	1934	Pitcher	2–6 record; 5.51 earned run average; 14 strikeouts	
Darren Daulton^{§}	1983; 1985–1997	Catcher	.245 batting average; 134 home runs; 567 runs batted in	
Curt Davis	1934–1936	Pitcher	37–35 record; 3.42 earned run average; 191 strikeouts	
Dick Davis	1981–1982	Right fielder	.311 batting average; 4 home runs; 26 runs batted in	
Dixie Davis	1918	Pitcher	0–2 record; 3.06 earned run average; 18 strikeouts	
Jacke Davis	1962	Left fielder	.213 batting average; 1 home run; 6 runs batted in	
Kane Davis	2007	Pitcher	0–1 record; 5.56 earned run average; 10 strikeouts	
Kiddo Davis	1932; 1934	Center fielder	.302 batting average; 11 triples; 105 runs batted in	
Mark Davis	1980–1981; 1993	Pitcher	2–6 record; 6.31 earned run average; 62 strikeouts	
Spud Davis	1928–1933; 1938–1939	Catcher	.321 batting average; 53 home runs; 363 runs batted in	
Bill Dawley	1988	Pitcher	0–2 record; 13.50 earned run average; 3 strikeouts	
Bill Day	1889–1890	Pitcher	1–4 record; 4.10 earned run average; 29 strikeouts	
Justin De Fratus	2011	Pitcher	1–0 record; 2.25 earned run average; 3 strikeouts	
Valerio de los Santos	2003	Pitcher	1–0 record; 9.00 earned run average; 4 strikeouts	
Wayland Dean	1926–1927	Pitcher	8–17 record; 5.01 earned run average; 53 strikeouts	
Art Decatur	1925–1927	Pitcher	7–18 record; 6.18 earned run average; 58 strikeouts	
Harry Decker	1889–1890	Second baseman	.204 batting average; 1 double; 4 runs batted in	
Pep Deininger	1908–1909	Center fielder	.260 batting average; 9 doubles; 16 runs batted in	
Bill Deitrick	1927–1928	Left fielder Shortstop	.198 batting average; 6 doubles; 7 runs batted in	
Iván DeJesús	1982–1984	Shortstop	.249 batting average; 15 triples; 139 runs batted in	
José DeJesús	1990–1991	Pitcher	17–17 record; 3.55 earned run average; 205 strikeouts	
Bobby Del Greco	1960–1961; 1965	Center fielder	.240 batting average; 12 home runs; 37 runs batted in	
Garton del Savio	1943	Shortstop	.091 batting average; 12 plate appearances; 1 walk	
Ed Delahanty^{‡§}	1888–1889; 1891–1901	Left fielder	.348 batting average; 442 doubles*; 157 triples*; 87 home runs	
Tom Delahanty	1894	Second baseman	.250 batting average; 1 single; 4 plate appearances	
José DeLeón	1992–1993	Pitcher	3–1 record; 3.19 earned run average; 41 strikeouts	
Eddie Delker	1932–1933	Second baseman	.165 batting average; 1 home run; 8 runs batted in	
David Dellucci	2006	Left fielder Right fielder	.292 batting average; 13 home runs; 39 runs batted in	
Al Demaree	1915–1916	Pitcher	33–25 record; 2.80 earned run average; 199 strikeouts	
Don Demeter	1961–1963	Outfielder; Third baseman	.276 batting average; 71 home runs; 258 runs batted in	
Tod Dennehey	1923	Left fielder	.292 batting average; 2 doubles; 2 runs batted in	
Jerry Denny	1891	First baseman Third baseman	.288 batting average; 1 double; 11 runs batted in	
John Denny	1982–1985	Pitcher	37–29 record; 2.96 earned run average; 375 strikeouts	
Mike DePangher	1884	Catcher	.200 batting average; 2 singles; 11 plate appearances	
Bob Dernier	1980–1983; 1988–1989	Center fielder Right fielder	.241 batting average; 7 home runs; 60 runs batted in	
Jim Deshaies	1995	Pitcher	0–1 record; 20.25 earned run average; 6 strikeouts	
Mickey Devine	1918	Catcher	.125 batting average; 1 double; 8 plate appearances	
Jim Devlin	1887	Pitcher	0–2 record; 6.00 earned run average; 6 strikeouts	
Josh Devore	1913–1914	Left fielder Center fielder	.293 batting average; 3 doubles; 12 runs batted in	
Bo Díaz	1982–1985	Catcher	.256 batting average; 36 home runs; 174 runs batted in	
Murry Dickson	1954–1956	Pitcher	22–34 record; 3.71 earned run average; 157 strikeouts	
Dutch Dietz	1943	Pitcher	1–1 record; 6.50 earned run average; 10 strikeouts	
Gordon Dillard	1989	Pitcher	6.75 earned run average; 3 runs allowed; 2 strikeouts	
Pickles Dillhoefer	1918	Catcher	.091 batting average; 1 singles; 2 stolen bases	
Vince DiMaggio	1945–1946	Center fielder	.255 batting average; 19 home runs; 85 runs batted in	
Kerry Dineen	1978	Left fielder	.250 batting average; 1 double; 9 plate appearances	
Vance Dinges	1945–1946	Outfielder	.291 batting average; 2 home runs; 46 runs batted in	
Ron Diorio	1973–1974	Pitcher	3.10 earned run average; 11 strikeouts; 7 walks	
Glenn Dishman	1996	Pitcher	7.71 earned run average; 3 strikeouts; 2 walks	
Greg Dobbs	2007–2010	Third baseman	.261 batting average; 29 home runs; 130 runs batted in	
Robert Dodd	1998	Pitcher	1–0 record; 7.20 earned run average; 4 strikeouts	
John Dodge	1912–1913	Third baseman	.126 batting average; 1 double; 3 runs batted in	
Cozy Dolan	1912–1913	Third baseman	.267 batting average; 6 doubles; 15 runs batted in	
Joe Dolan	1899–1901	Second baseman	.215 batting average; 2 home runs; 59 runs batted in	
Deacon Donahue	1943–1944	Pitcher	0–2 record; 6.75 earned run average; 3 strikeouts	
Red Donahue	1898–1901	Pitcher	72–48 record; 3.26 earned run average; 237 strikeouts	
She Donahue	1904	Shortstop; Third baseman	.215 batting average; 4 doubles; 14 runs batted in	
Blix Donnelly	1946–1950	Pitcher	16–22 record; 3.64 earned run average; 161 strikeouts	
Alexander Donoghue	1891	Center fielder Shortstop	.318 batting average; 1 double; 2 runs batted in	
Jerry Donovan	1906	Catcher	.199 batting average; 4 doubles; 15 runs batted in	
Red Dooin	1902–1914	Catcher	.241 batting average; 10 home runs; 335 runs batted in	
Mickey Doolan	1905–1913	Shortstop	.236 batting average; 11 home runs; 445 runs batted in	
David Doster	1996; 1999	Second baseman	.233 batting average; 4 home runs; 18 runs batted in	
Klondike Douglass	1898–1904	First baseman Catcher	.261 batting average; 22 triples; 197 runs batted in	
Tommy Dowd	1897	Right fielder	.292 batting average; 14 doubles; 43 runs batted in	
Ken Dowell	1987	Shortstop	.128 batting average; 5 singles; 1 run batted in	
Tom Downey	1912	Third baseman	.292 batting average; 1 home runs; 23 runs batted in	
Dave Downs	1972	Pitcher	1–1 record; 2.74 earned run average; 5 strikeouts	
Tom Dowse	1892	Catcher	.185 batting average; 10 hits; 6 runs batted in	
Conny Doyle	1883	Left fielder	.221 batting average; 3 doubles; 3 runs batted in	
Denny Doyle	1970–1973	Second baseman	.240 batting average; 9 home runs; 92 runs batted in	
Jack Doyle	1904	First baseman	.220 batting average; 1 home run; 22 runs batted in	
Solly Drake	1959	Left fielder	.145 batting average; 1 double; 3 runs batted in	
Karl Drews	1951–1954	Pitcher	25–25 record; 3.74 earned run average; 187 strikeouts	
Monk Dubiel	1948	Pitcher	8–10 record; 3.89 earned run average; 42 strikeouts	
Rob Ducey	1999–2000; 2000–2001	Left fielder	.232 batting average; 15 home runs; 62 runs batted in	
Brandon Duckworth	2001–2003	Pitcher	15–18 record; 4.87 earned run average; 275 strikeouts	
Clise Dudley	1931–1932	Pitcher	9–15 record; 3.84 earned run average; 55 strikeouts	
Hugh Duffy^{†}	1904–1906	Center fielder Left fielder	.287 batting average; 3 doubles; 8 runs batted in	
Gus Dugas	1933	First baseman	.169 batting average; 3 doubles; 9 runs batted in	
Oscar Dugey	1915–1917	Second baseman	.193 batting average; 8 doubles; 10 runs batted in	
Bill Duggleby	1898; 1901–1907	Pitcher	90–99 record; 3.20 earned run average; 445 strikeouts; 81 hit batsmen*	
Mariano Duncan	1992–1995	Second baseman Shortstop	.274 batting average; 30 home runs; 194 runs batted in	
Vern Duncan	1913	Right fielder Left fielder	.417 batting average; 1 double; 1 run batted in	
Lee Dunham	1926	First baseman	.250 batting average; 1 run batted in; 4 plate appearances	
Davey Dunkle	1897–1898	Pitcher	6–6 record; 5.32 earned run average; 30 strikeouts	
Jack Dunn	1900–1901	Pitcher	5–6 record; 5.74 earned run average; 13 strikeouts	
Chad Durbin	2008–2010	Pitcher	11–7 record; 3.62 earned run average; 188 strikeouts	
J. D. Durbin	2007	Pitcher	6–5 record; 5.15 earned run average; 39 strikeouts	
Ryne Duren	1963–1965	Pitcher	6–2 record; 3.38 earned run average; 95 strikeouts	
George Durning	1925	Right fielder	.357 batting average; 5 hits; 1 run batted in	
Lenny Dykstra	1989–1996	Center fielder	.289 batting average; 51 home runs; 251 runs batted in	

== Footnotes ==
Key

- ^{H} The National Baseball Hall of Fame and Museum determines which cap a player wears on their plaque, signifying "the team with which he made his most indelible mark". The Hall of Fame considers the player's wishes in making their decision, but the Hall makes the final decision as "it is important that the logo be emblematic of the historical accomplishments of that player's career".
- ^{P} Players are listed at a position if they appeared in 30% of their games or more during their Phillies career, as defined by Baseball-Reference. Additional positions may be shown on the Baseball-Reference website by following each player's citation.
- ^{R} Franchise batting and pitching leaders are drawn from Baseball-Reference. A total of 1,500 plate appearances are needed to qualify for batting records, and 500 innings pitched or 50 decisions are required to qualify for pitching records.
- ^{S} Statistics are correct as of the end of the 2010 Major League Baseball season.

== See also ==
- Mahlon Duckett, who was drafted by the Phillies at the age of 85 as part of the 2008 special Negro leagues draft, but did not play any games
