= Delehanty =

Delehanty is a surname. Notable people with the surname include:

- Frances W. Delehanty (1879–1977), American artist, illustrator, and designer
- Francis Blase Delehanty (1859–1932), American judge
- Megan Delehanty (born 1968), Canadian rower
- Nick Delehanty, Irish political commentator and former business owner

== See also ==
- Delahanty
