= Joe Delahanty =

American baseball player (1875–1936)

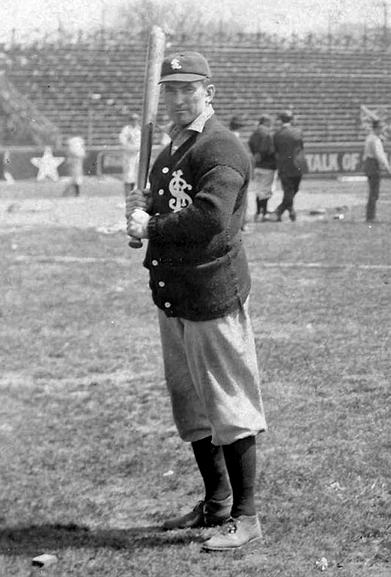
- Outfielder
- Born: October 18, 1875; Cleveland, Ohio, U.S.
- Died: January 29, 1936 (aged 60); Cleveland, Ohio, U.S.
- Batted: Right Threw: Right

MLB debut
- September 30, 1907, for the St. Louis Cardinals

Last MLB appearance
- October 6, 1909, for the St. Louis Cardinals

MLB statistics
- Batting average: .238
- Home runs: 4
- Runs batted in: 100
- Stats at Baseball Reference

Teams
- St. Louis Cardinals (1907–1909)

Joseph Nicholas Delahanty (October 18, 1875 in Cleveland, Ohio – January 29, 1936 in Cleveland, Ohio), was an American professional baseball player who played outfield and second base in the major leagues from 1907 to 1909. He was one of five Delahanty brothers to play in the majors: the others were Ed, Frank, Jim, and Tom.

Delahanty started his professional career in 1897. He had his breakthrough year in 1907, hitting .355 for Williamsport of the Tri-State League. In August, he was purchased by the St. Louis Cardinals. He became the team's regular left fielder the following season and played with them through 1909. On Joe's major league debut in 1907, the Delahanty brothers broke the record for the most siblings ever to play major league baseball (five), a record which still stands. The previous record (four) had been established in 1901 by the Cross brothers: Amos, Lave, Joe and Frank.

After his baseball career ended, Delahanty worked in a sheriff's office.
