= Joe Cross (baseball) =

American baseball player (1858–1933)

- Right fielder
- Born: January 6, 1858; Chicago, Illinois, U.S.
- Died: April 2, 1933 (aged 75); Cleveland, Ohio, U.S.
- Batted: Unknown Threw: Unknown

MLB debut
- September 5, 1888, for the Louisville Colonels

Last MLB appearance
- September 5, 1888, for the Louisville Colonels

MLB statistics
- Games played: 1
- At bats: 1
- Hits: 0
- Stats at Baseball Reference

Teams
- Louisville Colonels (1888)

Joseph A. Cross (January 6, 1858 – April 2, 1933, born Joseph Kriz) was an American Major League Baseball right fielder who played one game for the Louisville Colonels in 1888. His brothers Frank Cross, Lave Cross, and Amos Cross also played in the major leagues.

Unusually, Joe Cross was not listed in baseball reference books for over a century. It was not until 2012, 124 years after his lone major league appearance, that research showed that Joe Cross appeared in one game for the Colonels on September 5, 1888. The game had long been credited to Lave Cross in the record books, but a contemporaneous report in The Cleveland Plain Dealer noted for the September 5 match that after a seventh inning injury to a player: "Cross of the Graphics, a brother of Lave, a Louisville catcher, took (Toad Ramsey)'s place in right."

Amos had died a few months earlier, and Frank was only 15 in 1888. This and other corroborating evidence placed Joe Cross in the game and in the record books, after over a century of waiting.

After his brief playing career ended, Joe Cross lived in Cleveland and worked variously as a cigar maker, a caulker, a storekeeper, a machinist, and an employee of Cleveland's Division of Water. Although he was the oldest of the four Kriz/Cross brothers who appeared in the majors, Joe outlived each of the other three.
