= Bill Hassamaer =

American baseball player (1864–1910)

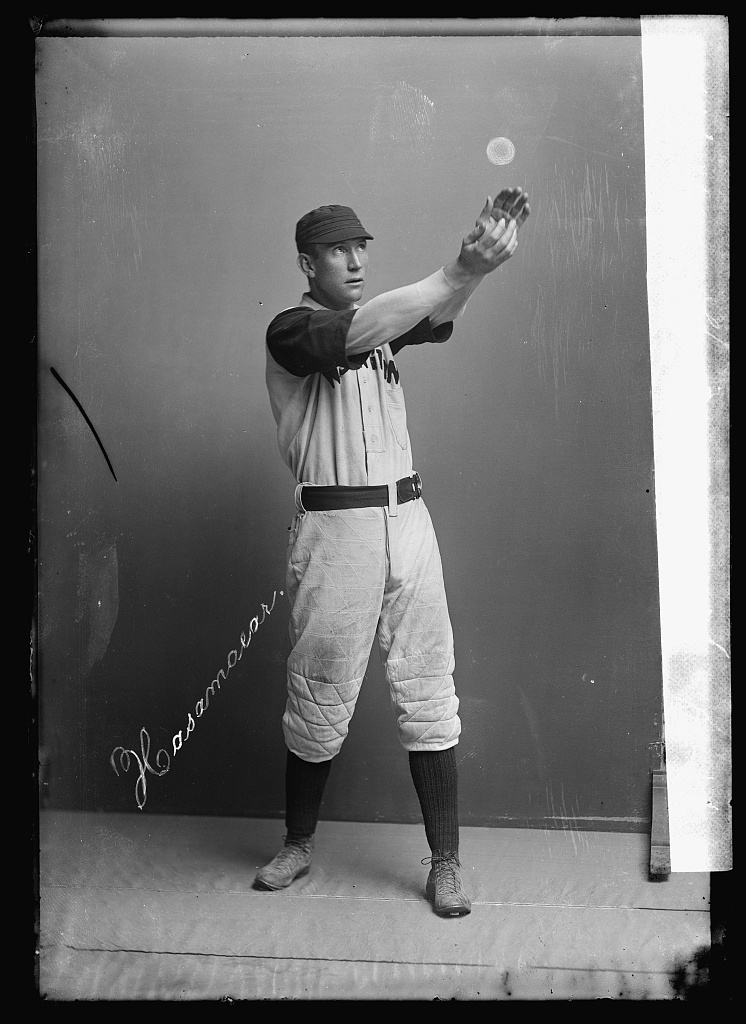
- Hassamaer in 1894
- Outfielder / Infielder
- Born: July 26, 1864; St. Louis, Missouri, US
- Died: May 25, 1910 (aged 45); St. Louis, Missouri, US
- Batted: Unknown Threw: Unknown

MLB debut
- April 19, 1894, for the Washington Senators

Last MLB appearance
- July 6, 1896, for the Louisville Colonels

MLB statistics
- Batting average: .289
- Runs batted in: 178
- Home Runs: 7
- Stats at Baseball Reference

Teams
- Washington Senators (1894–1895); Louisville Colonels (1895–1896)

William Louis Hassamaer (July 26, 1864 – May 25, 1910) was an American former professional baseball player who played outfield in the Major Leagues from 1894 to 1896. He played for the Louisville Colonels and Washington Senators.

== See also ==
- List of Major League Baseball players to hit for the cycle

Achievements
| Preceded by Lave Cross | Hitting for the cycle June 13, 1894 | Succeeded by Sam Thompson |
