= Dave Downs =

American baseball player (born 1952)

- Pitcher
- Born: June 21, 1952 (age 74); Logan, Utah
- Batted: Right Threw: Right

MLB debut
- September 2, 1972, for the Philadelphia Phillies

Last MLB appearance
- September 19, 1972, for the Philadelphia Phillies

MLB statistics
- Win–loss record: 1–1
- Earned run average: 2.74
- Strikeouts: 5
- Stats at Baseball Reference

Teams
- Philadelphia Phillies (1972)

David Ralph Downs (born June 21, 1952) is an American former professional baseball pitcher. He played for several Minor League Baseball (MiLB) teams between 1970 and 1976, arriving in Major League Baseball (MLB) in 1972 for four games with the Philadelphia Phillies. He was officially listed as standing 6 feet 5 inches (1.96 m) and weighing 220 pounds (100 kg), during his playing days. He is the brother of pitcher Kelly Downs.

== Early life ==
Downs was born in Logan, Utah on June 21, 1952. He attended Viewmont High School in Bountiful, Utah, one of six baseball players drafted from that institution. He was selected by the Philadelphia Phillies with the sixth pick of the sixth round (128th overall) of the 1970 Major League Baseball draft.

== Baseball career ==
=== 1970–1971: Walla Walla and Spartanburg ===
At 18 years old, Downs was assigned to the low-A level Walla Walla Phillies of the Northwest League, where he posted a 5–7 win–loss record in 14 games played (all starts); his seven losses were the highest total on that year's team. In 80 innings pitched, Downs collected a 5.62 earned run average (ERA), walking 26 batters and allowing 103 hits. He was promoted to the Spartanburg Phillies in 1971, a member of the A-level Western Carolinas League. Downs amassed a 5–4 record in 12 starts with Spartanburg, walking 28 batters in 65 innings. He notched a 4.43 ERA and allowed only two home runs in his tenure.

=== 1972: Reading and Philadelphia ===
Downs moved up to the AA-level Reading Phillies of the Eastern League for the 1972 season. As a hitter, he batted .167 with one double and one home run, scoring seven runs. On the mound, he started 26 games, comping a 15–7 record with 15 complete games. He struck out 96 batters and walked 40 in 183 innings, earning a promotion to the major league club in Philadelphia.

Downs made his major league debut on September 2 at Atlanta–Fulton County Stadium in the second game of a doubleheader against the Atlanta Braves. He allowed his first hit to the opposing pitcher, Mike McQueen, in the third inning of the game. Downs allowed eight hits in the contest, walking one batter and striking out two; he pitched a complete-game shutout to earn his first major league victory. He started again for the Phillies on September 8, pitching seven innings and allowing the first runs of his career on a two-run home run by Billy Williams of the Chicago Cubs. He did not earn a decision in the game, as the Phillies lost, 4–3. Downs took his first loss against the New York Mets on September 13, allowing three runs in three innings pitched; the game's winner was future Phillie Tug McGraw. He pitched in one more game for the Phillies, a four-inning start against the St. Louis Cardinals on September 19, before he injured his shoulder and was deactivated for the season.

=== Return to the minors ===
After spending the 1973 season on the disabled list, Downs was sent back to the minor leagues. In the spring of 1974, he underwent an "exploratory surgery" to enlarge the groove in his shoulder by removing a piece of the tendons. He started six games for the Rocky Mount Phillies in 1974, winning two games and losing one while amassing a 5.10 ERA.

Downs did not pitch in 1975, but returned in 1976 with Spartanburg. He collected a team-worst 9.39 ERA with a 1–6 record in 46 innings before shutting down for the year. Downs was invited to Phillies spring training for the 1977 season, but opted to retire instead of reporting.

== Pitching style ==
Downs threw four pitches: a standard four-seam fastball, a changeup, a curveball, and a slider, whose development he credited to his Spartanburg manager—Hall of Famer, Philadelphia Baseball Wall of Fame member, and perfect game pitcher Jim Bunning. He added the slider on promotion to Reading in 1972 and claimed that Bunning gave him "the confidence that I can get it over any time I need to".

== See also ==
- Philadelphia Phillies all-time roster (D)
