= George Durning =

American baseball player (1898-1986)

- Right fielder
- Born: May 9, 1898; Philadelphia, Pennsylvania, U.S.
- Died: April 18, 1986 (aged 87); Tampa, Florida, U.S.
- Batted: Right Threw: Right

MLB debut
- September 12, 1925, for the Philadelphia Phillies

Last MLB appearance
- September 26, 1925, for the Philadelphia Phillies

MLB statistics
- Batting average: .357
- Hits: 5
- Runs batted in: 1
- Stats at Baseball Reference

Teams
- Philadelphia Phillies (1925)

George Dewey Durning (May 9, 1898 – April 18, 1986) was an American right fielder in Major League Baseball who played for the Philadelphia Phillies in its 1925 season. He was officially listed as standing 5 feet 11 inches (180 cm) and 175 pounds (79 kg). In addition to his brief major league career, Durning played four seasons for an assortment of minor league baseball teams. He was born in Philadelphia, Pennsylvania.

== Major leagues ==
Durning began his career at the major league level, debuting with the Phillies on September 12, 1925. He appeared in five major league contests, amassing 14 at-bats in 16 plate appearances. He batted in one run and struck out one time. He also made 11 putouts and notched 2 assists in 4 games in the field, participating in one double play.

== Minor leagues ==
In the 1926 season, Durning began play for the AA-level Reading Keystones, playing in six games. Durning was recalled to Philadelphia in April 1926, but did not play another game for them. Upon moving to the Salisbury Indians of the Class-D Eastern Shore League, he led the team in games played (81), at-bats (320), and hits (106). His .331 batting average was third-highest on the team, and he collected six doubles, one triple, and six home runs. He moved back to the Indians for the 1927 season, batting .299 in a team-leading 89 games. His 103 hits were tied for the team lead (Emmett Athey), as were his two triples; he was second on the squad with 15 home runs and led the team with 17 doubles.

Durning did not play in the 1928 season, but resurfaced with the Cumberland Colts, a Class-C team of the Middle Atlantic League, in 1929. His .329 average that season was second on the Colts to John Byrnes; he led the team with 12 triples and his 15 home runs were second-best behind David Black. He collected 462 at-bats, the highest recorded total of his career. After batting .308 in 78 games in the 1930 season, Durning left professional baseball.

== After baseball ==
Durning died on April 18, 1986, in Tampa, Florida, aged 87.

== See also ==
- Philadelphia Phillies all-time roster (D)
