= Ray Delahanty =

American urban planner

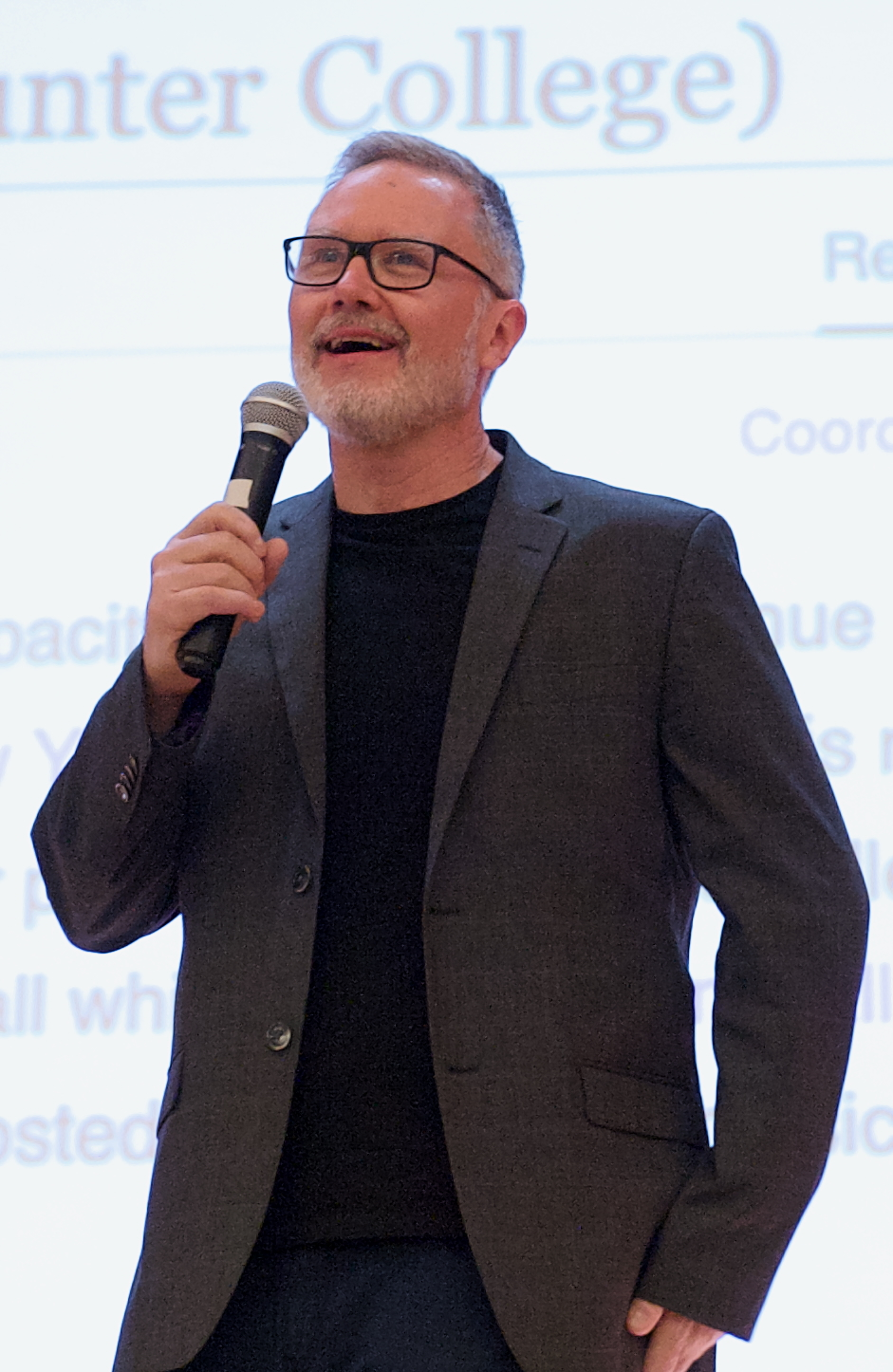
- Ray Delahanty in 2025.
- Education: Portland State University
- Occupations: YouTuber, traffic engineer, urban planner
- Known for: CityNerd YouTube channel

Ray Delahanty is a content creator and former urban planner who operates under the name CityNerd on YouTube. He mainly examines urbanist issues, with a focus on transportation and housing.

== Career ==
He graduated from Portland State University with a Master of Urban and Regional Planning.

Delahanty worked for the Oregon Department of Transportation and Multnomah County as a traffic engineer. He then worked for private companies in traffic and transport planning, including modelling.

Following these positions, he started the CityNerd YouTube channel on 9 July 2021 and now has over 412,000 subscribers. While CityNerd videos usually have a theme and top 10 list format, in November 2024, Delahanty interviewed the outgoing Transportation Secretary, Pete Buttigieg, about the state of U.S. passenger rail and its future.
