= Dolores Delahanty =

American social activist and political leader

Dolores Sheslo Delahanty
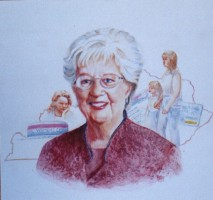
- advocate for women's and children's rights
- Born: October 23, 1929 (age 96); Illinois
- Occupations: social worker, women's rights activist, educator, local government administrator
- Spouse: Robert Delahanty
- Children: Sean, Kevin, Tim, Shannon, Terence
- Parent(s): Katherine Zielinska and William A. Sheslo

Dolores Delahanty (born October 23, 1929) is a social activist and political leader in Louisville, Kentucky. She was a founding member of the National Women's Political Caucus during the early Civil Rights Movement, and she was critical to the success of Kentucky's Fair Credit Law. Delahanty has devoted her life to improving the lives of others, primarily those of Kentucky women and children.

== Background ==
Delahanty was born in 1929 in Rockford, Illinois to Katherine Zielinska and William A. Sheslo. In June 1950 Dolores married Judge Robert Delahanty, a man with whom she conceived five children – Judge Sean Delahanty, Judge Kevin Delahanty, Tim, Shannon and Terence Delahanty.

She graduated from the Kent School of Social Work at the University of Louisville in 1964.

== Social activism ==
Delahanty was involved with several social work organizations fighting for the welfare of women and children. She worked from 1955 to 1965 as a case consultant and probation officer at the Jefferson County Juvenile Courts. After that, Delahanty worked as a director of the Parkland Group Treatment Center from 1965 to 1967. Delahanty went on to direct the Office of Research and Planning at the Metropolitan Social Services Department in Louisville from 1967 to 1973.

Delahanty's passion for social work showed in her teaching when she became a lecturer at Bellarmine-Ursuline College from 1966 to 1967. She focused her students' studies on social problems and social work methods. She later became an adjunct professor at the University of Louisville. Delahanty was concerned about education and served on several school boards, including the Jefferson County Board of Education's Family Life and Sex Education Advisory Board.

Delahanty eventually became president of the Kentucky chapter of the National Association of Social Workers and later, vice president of the National Association of Social Workers. Delahanty chaired the National Association of Social Workers Insurance Trust. She also served on the Kentucky Advisory Committee to the United States Commission on Civil Rights. This committee compiled research and evidence that neither race nor gender were properly represented within the Kentucky Police Force in a 1978 report titled, "A Paper Commitment: Equal Employment Opportunity in the Kentucky Bureau of State Police."

One of her greatest accomplishments involves her work with the National Women's Political Caucus. As a proponent of women's rights, Dolores hoped that improvements in the lives of women was to get encourage and train more women to become involved in politics and make an impact. Delahanty was involved at the beginning of the National Women's Political Caucus and attended its first meeting in July 1971. Then in September 1971, Delahanty co-founded the Kentucky Women's Political Caucus (KWPC). Later she represented the KWPC at the National's steering committee and represented the entire Mid-South Region. Delahanty was a founding member of the Metropolitan Louisville Women's Political Caucus and later became its coordinator from 1972 to 1973. She led a challenge to the credentials of the Kentucky Democratic delegation to the 1972 national convention in Miami—in the future, all delegations to the Democratic National Conventions were to be 50 percent female. Delahanty then served as the National Convention's Committee Chair in 1974. Delahanty was wholly involved with this organization on the national, state, and community level.

== Public office ==
From 1973 to 1976, Delahanty served as secretary of the Kentucky Governor's Commission on Women. The Commission on Women is devoted to improving the health, status, equality, and education of women, while also bringing to light issues that promote change. As the chair person of the Legislative Task Force, Delahanty led the movement to combine organizational efforts through the state that were fighting for women's rights and lobbying for changes to Kentucky laws. For example, unequal and sexist laws, such as the Kentucky state law ruling that the Clerk to the Board of Agriculture must be male. Not only was the Commission on Women trying to make the laws beneficial to females, but equal and fair for both sexes. Each were trying to change such inequalities like those found in the Kentucky state law that gave all wives the right to collect on their spouse's death benefits, but husbands only collected if they were unable to work. Within this organization Delahanty fought for equality for all Kentuckians.

Delahanty was instrumental in the passing of Kentucky's Fair Credit Law. She was appointed by President Jimmy Carter to study the aid given to women from the Health and Human Services. In 1982 while working in Jefferson County Department for Human Services, Delahanty was part of a group effort to found Project Warm, an organization that provides free weatherization services to low-income people and educating them on how to conserve heat during the winter.

In 1984 several homeless people were found dead inside abandoned buildings in Louisville. Mayor Harvey I. Sloane called together civic and business leaders to lead a task force on homelessness. The St. John Day Center, Louisville's first day shelter for the homeless. Delahanty served as president of the Metropolitan Housing Coalition and of the Coalition for the Homeless, continuing today to address these critical human rights issues.

As the Executive Director of the Jefferson County Department for Human Services in the late 1980s, she managed a $10 million budget, over 450 employees and dozens of programs for youth, families in crisis, the elderly and disabled. She helped to create the Crimes against Children Unit, a joint operation between the Louisville and Jefferson County Police - Philip C. Turner was the first commander of the joint unit in 1987.

Her extensive experience led to her becoming a management consultant to non-profit organizations in the 1990s, including serving as Senior Advisor to the Kentucky Cabinet for Families and Children.

In 2000 she was elected as a Democrat to a four-year term as the "B" District County Commissioner in Jefferson County. While commissioner, she challenged the city to be more vigilant in keeping rental property up to code. In 2001, Amanda Kreps-Long, director of the Louisville Tenant Association, brought to Delahanty's attention the terrible conditions of the Lake in the Woods apartment complex. Though the property owner had numerous violations on record, the severely understaffed health department had not followed up with inspections. Delahanty and a sympathetic press (in October 2001, the Courier-Journal ran a three-day series of articles exposing the bad conditions for renters in and around Louisville) showcased the failing attempts by the county to enforce the property maintenance codes. Commissioner Delahanty spearheaded the effort to overhaul the codes, drawing on international models.

In 2009 Delahanty served on a task force to address the location of homeless shelters. Members of the task force included members of non-profit organizations such as the League of Women Voters of Louisville and the Louisville Coalition of Neighborhoods, representatives of the business and housing development community, the press, members of various outreach service organizations, and government agencies such as the Board of Zoning Adjustment, Jefferson County-Louisville Metro 6th District and the Louisville Downtown Management District. The task force created guidelines for where a homeless shelter can be built and to amend the Louisville Metro Land Development Code.

Delahanty serves on the volunteer Board of Directors for the Community Foundation of Louisville, a regional philanthropic leader providing support for nonprofit organizations in and around Louisville.

== Awards and honors ==
Among her many achievements in all she has done for Kentucky and its women, she was awarded the

- Distinguished Citizen Award for the City of Louisville in 1974
- the Mary Rhodes Award in 1982 from the Loretto Community through the Loretto Women's Network
- Alumni Fellow of the University of Louisville
- a Woman of Distinction awarded by the Center for Women and Families
- the Examplar Award from the National Network of Social Work Managers
- the Woman of Achievement Award from the River City Business and Professional Women
- the Woman of the Year award from the Metropolitan Women's Political Caucus
- Inducted in the Kentucky Civil Rights Hall of Fame in 2012.

Delahanty was also a 2002 Kentucky Women Remembered Honoree of the Kentucky Commission on Women. Her portrait is on exhibit at the Kentucky state capital's West Wing in Frankfort, Kentucky.

== Publications ==
Delahanty, Delores S., and Atkins, G. Lawrence. "Strategic Local Planning: A Collaborative Model". DHEW Publication, no. (OS)-76-130. Human Services Monograph Series (Project Share), no. 23. Rockville, Md.: The Project, 1981.
