= Lave Cross =

American baseball player (1866–1927)

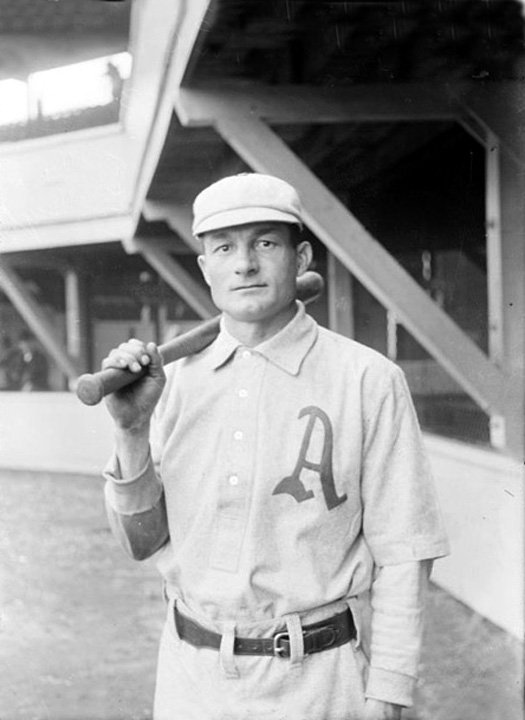
- Third baseman / Catcher
- Born: May 12, 1866; Milwaukee, Wisconsin, U.S.
- Died: September 6, 1927 (aged 61); Toledo, Ohio, U.S.
- Batted: Right Threw: Right

MLB debut
- April 23, 1887, for the Louisville Colonels

Last MLB appearance
- June 6, 1907, for the Washington Senators

MLB statistics
- Batting average: .292
- Hits: 2,651
- Home runs: 47
- Runs batted in: 1,371
- Stats at Baseball Reference

Teams
- Louisville Colonels (1887–1888); Philadelphia Athletics (AA) (1889); Philadelphia Quakers/Athletics (PL/AA) (1890–1891); Philadelphia Phillies (1892–1897); St. Louis Browns (1898); Cleveland Spiders (1899); St. Louis Perfectos/Cardinals (1899–1900); Brooklyn Superbas (1900); Philadelphia Athletics (AL) (1901–1905); Washington Senators (1906–1907)

Career highlights and awards
- National League pennant (1900); American League pennant (1902, 1905)

Lafayette Napoleon Cross (born Vratislav Kriz, May 12, 1866 – September 6, 1927) was an American professional baseball player. He played in Major League Baseball as a third baseman from 1887 to 1907. Cross played most of his 21-year career with Philadelphia-based teams in four different leagues. One of the sport's top all-around players in the years surrounding the turn of the 20th century, when he retired he ranked fifth in major league history in hits (2,644) and runs batted in (1,371), ninth in doubles (411) and total bases (3,466), and third in games played (2,275) and at bats (9,064).

Cross also excelled as a defensive player. After beginning his major league career as a catcher, he led third basemen in fielding percentage five times, and ended his career with nearly every fielding record at that position: games (1,721), putouts (2,306), assists (3,706), total chances (6,406), and fielding average (.938); his 212 double plays ranked third behind Billy Nash and Arlie Latham. He captained the Philadelphia Athletics teams which captured two of the first five American League pennants.

== Early life ==
Born as Vratislav Kriz, he was born in Milwaukee, Wisconsin to immigrants from Bohemia; the Kriz family moved to Cleveland during his childhood. By the end of the 1880s, Kriz changed his name to Lafayette Cross, although he was generally referred to as "Lave." A total of four sons of the Kriz (later Cross) family would play major league baseball; older sons Joe and Amos, third son Lave, and youngest son Frank.

== Career ==
Cross began his career as a secondary catcher and occasional outfielder with the 1887-1888 Louisville Colonels. His brother Amos was the regular catcher for Louisville in 1885 and 1886, but only played 8 games in 1887, the year Lave made his major league debut; Lave played in 51 games that year. Amos died in 1888, reportedly of "consumption of the lungs", without playing baseball that year. Oldest brother Joe Cross played a portion of one game in 1888 as a right fielder and Louisville teammate of Lave's, though Lave himself did not play in that particular game due to injury.

Lave Cross's contract was sold to the Philadelphia Athletics of the American Association for the 1889 season, and he jumped to the Philadelphia Quakers of the Players' League in 1890 staying with them as they joined the AA in 1891. That season he saw his first regular play, splitting time in the outfield and behind the plate, and also playing at third base for the first time; in addition, he batted .301 and finished fifth in the league in slugging average.

After the American Association's merger with the National League in 1892, he joined the Philadelphia Phillies from 1892 through 1897. In his first two years he played as a catcher and third baseman, while in the last two years he played primarily at third with substantial play as a second baseman and shortstop. Playing exclusively at third in 1895, he led the National League in assists and fielding average for the first time. He also became a solid hitter, batting a career-high .386 with 125 runs batted in (RBI) and 123 runs in 1894. Cross has the distinction of being the first player of the Philadelphia Phillies to hit for the cycle, doing so on April 24, 1894, against the Brooklyn Bridegrooms. Cross drove in four runs, starting with a double in the first inning, a single in the second inning, a triple in the sixth inning, and a home run in the seventh inning, which was the final one he played, as he was taken out as catcher (having moved there from third base in the first inning due to injury) by his manager in a game that Philadelphia won 22–5. During this period, major league rules did not restrict the size of infielders' gloves, and he continued to use his catcher's mitt in the field; on August 5, 1897 he set a still-standing record at second base with 15 assists in a 12-inning game.

He was traded to the St. Louis Browns after the 1897 season, and responded with an 1898 campaign in which he hit .317 – the first of seven straight seasons at .290 or better – and finished among the league leaders in hits, doubles and total bases, while again leading the league in assists and fielding average. Before the 1899 season, the Browns were purchased by the owner of the competing Cleveland Spiders and renamed the Perfectos. The new owners promptly shifted almost all the best players on both teams to St. Louis, with Cleveland being used as a de facto farm club; Cross was sent to Cleveland in the thankless role of player-manager, but was returned to St. Louis after an 8–30 start. Cleveland played even worse afterwards, ending the season at 20–134 and being promptly dissolved, later becoming known as the worst club in major league history. Cross hit .303 after returning to St. Louis, and led the league in double plays and fielding. In May 1900 his contract was sold to the Brooklyn Superbas, who went on to win the pennant. After over a dozen years on second-rate teams, during which his club managed only a pair of third-place finishes, the move to a championship team was most welcome, and he ended the season among the NL's top ten in RBI (73) while leading the league in fielding for the fourth time.

With the elevation of the American League to major league status in 1901, many stars from the National League saw an opportunity to move away from that league's longstanding turmoil and rowdiness. Cross jumped to the Athletics franchise in the new league and became one of the veteran leaders on Connie Mack's club. As team captain, he batted .328, and was among the American League leaders in batting, slugging and doubles. In 1902 he improved his average to .342 and was among the league's top three players in hits (191), doubles (39) and RBI (108) as the Athletics won the pennant; the 108 RBI were a record for a player without any home runs. On April 23 of that year he began a streak of 447 consecutive games (all but one of them at third base), then one of the ten longest in history, which ended on May 8, 1905. In each of the next two seasons he hit .290 or better while ending the year in the top ten in hits and RBI, and in 1905 he finished second in the league with 77 RBI at age 39 as the team won another pennant. But in the 1905 World Series, batting cleanup, he collected only two singles in the five games as the Athletics were crushed by the New York Giants, being shut out three times by Christy Mathewson and outscored 15–3.

In January 1906 he was sent to the Washington Senators; he led the league in fielding average for the fifth time at age 40, and ended his career in 1907 after hitting .199 in 41 games. Over 21 seasons he batted .292 with 1,333 runs, 47 home runs and 135 triples, in addition to the totals noted above. His hit total ranked second among right-handed batters behind Cap Anson. In 1906 he surpassed Arlie Latham's record of 1,571 career games at third base; Pie Traynor broke the record in 1934. His records for career putouts and total chances were broken by Jimmy Collins in 1908; but his assists record stood until 1964, when Eddie Mathews broke it. His career fielding average was topped in the late 1910s by several players. He is the only one of the top five in hits at the time of retirement to not be in the National Baseball Hall of Fame.

== Later life ==
While Cross played his last professional game in 1907, he continued playing minor league ball until 1912, having played 27 seasons in baseball while also managing for a couple of years. Cross was married twice, and he had one daughter. The Cross family resided in Toledo, Ohio after he retired from baseball; he worked as a machinist at an automobile factory. On September 6, 1927, when walking to work, he suffered a heart attack and died; he was 61 years old. His older brother Amos Cross was a major league catcher from 1885 to 1887, and his younger brother Frank Cross played one game as a right fielder for the 1901 Cleveland Blues.

== Other achievements ==
- 5× league leader (4× NL, 1× AL) in fielding percentage for third basemen (1895, 1898, 1899, 1900, 1905)
- St. Louis Cardinals single-season franchise leader in AB/SO (134.333 in 1899)

== See also ==
- List of Major League Baseball career hits leaders
- List of Major League Baseball career doubles leaders
- List of Major League Baseball career triples leaders
- List of Major League Baseball career runs scored leaders
- List of Major League Baseball career runs batted in leaders
- List of Major League Baseball career stolen bases leaders
- List of Major League Baseball player-managers
- List of Major League Baseball players to hit for the cycle
- List of St. Louis Cardinals team records

Achievements
Preceded by Abner Dalrymple	Hitting for the cycle April 24, 1894	Succeeded by Bill Hassamaer
