= Tom Donovan (baseball) =

American baseball player

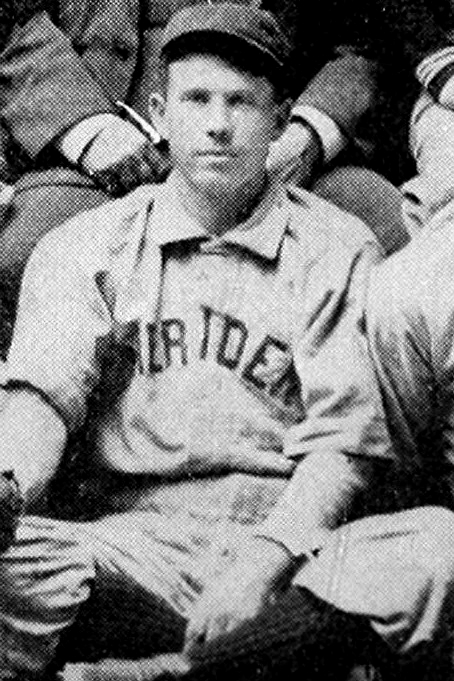
- Outfielder
- Born: January 1, 1873; West Troy, New York, U.S.
- Died: March 25, 1933 (aged 60); Watervliet, New York, U.S.
- Batted: Right Threw: Right

MLB debut
- September 10, 1901, for the Cleveland Blues

Last MLB appearance
- September 28, 1901, for the Cleveland Blues

MLB statistics
- Batting average: .254
- Home runs: 0
- Runs batted in: 5
- Stats at Baseball Reference

Teams
- Cleveland Blues (1901)

Thomas Joseph Donovan (January 1, 1873 – March 25, 1933) was an American Major League Baseball outfielder who played for one season. He played for the Cleveland Blues for 18 games from September 10 to September 28, 1901. His brother, Jerry Donovan, also played in the majors.
