= Frank Cross (baseball) =

American baseball player (1873–1932)

- Outfielder
- Born: January 20, 1873; Cleveland, Ohio, U.S.
- Died: November 2, 1932 (aged 59); Aurora, Ohio, U.S.
- Batted: Unknown Threw: Right

MLB debut
- May 20, 1901, for the Cleveland Blues

Last MLB appearance
- May 20, 1901, for the Cleveland Blues

MLB statistics
- Batting average: .600
- Hits: 3
- Games played: 1
- Stats at Baseball Reference

Teams
- Cleveland Blues (1901)

Frank Atwell Cross (January 20, 1873 – November 2, 1932) was an American Major League Baseball player in 1901. Nicknamed "Mickey", he played for the Cleveland Blues for one game on May 20. His brothers, Joe Cross, Amos and Lave, also played in the Major Leagues. A week after his lone major league appearance, he requested his release and rejoined the minor league Dayton Old Soldiers, where he had an opportunity to play every day.
