= Francis B. Delehanty =

American jurist (1859–1932)

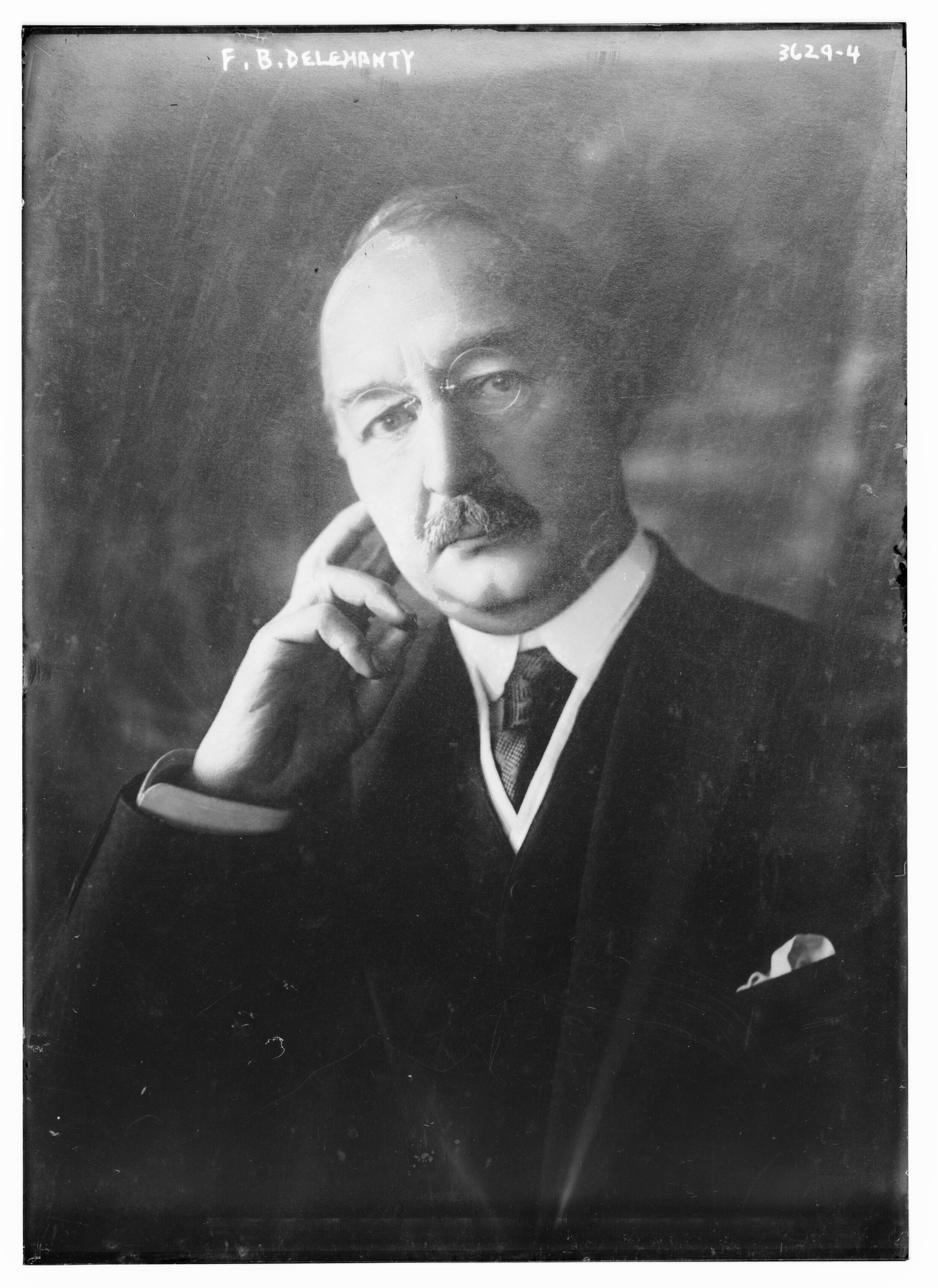
Francis B. Delehanty circa 1915

Francis Blase Delehanty (February 3, 1859 – October 7, 1932) was an American lawyer and jurist who served as justice of the New York Supreme Court from 1915 to 1930.

He was born to Michael Delehanty and Mary Quinn in Albany, New York. He practiced law in Albany until 1897, when he moved to New York City. In 1900 he was elected judge of the City Court of New York City for a 10-year term, and was re-elected for a second term in 1911, resigning in 1915 to accept an appointment to the New York State Supreme Court.

He married Annie Cecelia Lynch in 1887, and with her had a son, Francis B. Lynch Jr., also a lawyer.

He died at his home in New York from bronchial pneumonia on October 7, 1932.
