= Jim Delahanty =

American baseball player (1879–1953)

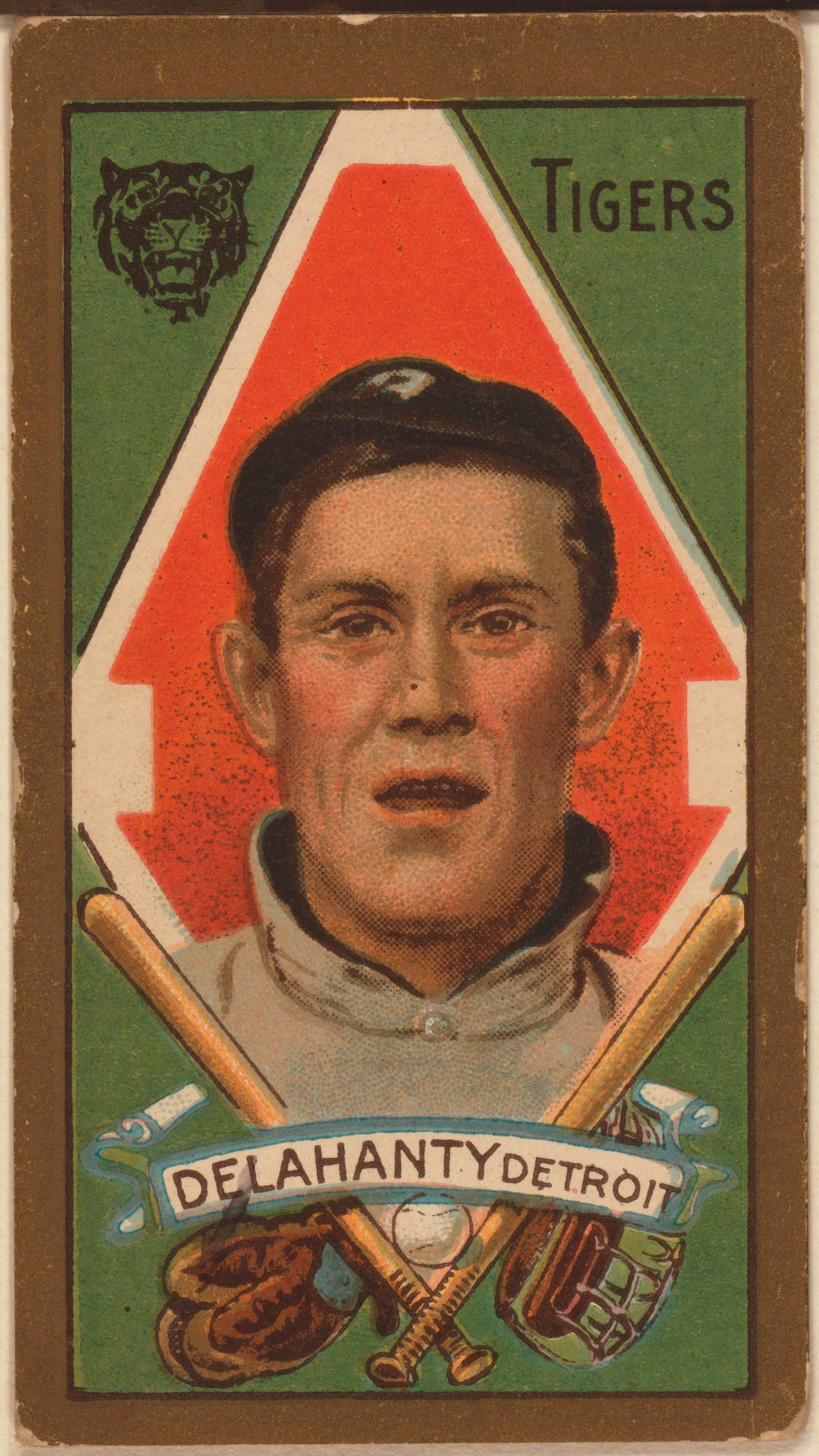
- Jim Delahanty baseball card
- Second baseman
- Born: June 20, 1879; Cleveland, Ohio, U.S.
- Died: October 17, 1953 (aged 74); Cleveland, Ohio, U.S.
- Batted: Right Threw: Right

MLB debut
- April 19, 1901, for the Chicago Orphans

Last MLB appearance
- May 8, 1915, for the Brooklyn Tip-Tops

MLB statistics
- Batting average: .283
- Hits: 1,159
- Hit by pitch: 92
- Stats at Baseball Reference

Teams
- Chicago Orphans (1901); New York Giants (1902); Boston Beaneaters (1904–1905); Cincinnati Reds (1906); St. Louis Browns (1907); Washington Senators (1907–1909); Detroit Tigers (1909–1912); Brooklyn Tip-Tops (1914–1915)

James Christopher Delahanty (June 20, 1879 – October 17, 1953) was an American second baseman in Major League Baseball. He played thirteen seasons with eight clubs: the Chicago Orphans (1901), New York Giants (1902), Boston Beaneaters (1904–05), Cincinnati Reds (1906), St. Louis Browns (1907), Washington Senators (1907–09), Detroit Tigers (1909–12), and Brooklyn Tip-Tops (1914–15).

Born in Cleveland, Ohio, he batted and threw right-handed. He was the fourth of six brothers, and all of them played professional baseball, with five of them (Jim, Ed, Frank, Joe, and Tom) appearing at the major-league level. After his baseball career, Delahanty moved back to Cleveland occasionally playing in exhibition games with his brothers, where he lived until he died.

== Biography ==
Delahanty was born to a Cleveland teamster into a family of six boys and two girls. Five of the Delahanty brothers became Major League Baseball players, including older brother Ed Delahanty, and the sixth brother played minor-league baseball.

Beginning in 1896, Delahanty played minor-league baseball for several teams until the Chicago Orphans bought his contract in 1901. His introduction to the major leagues was brief, as Delahanty broke his patella after 17 games, ending his rookie season. After that season, Delahanty was traded to the New York Giants. He played briefly for the team, but he spent most of 1902 and all of 1903 back in the minor leagues. He hit .382 for the 1903 Little Rock Travelers.

He played his first full season in 1904, in which he batted .285 with the Beaneaters. Boston traded Delahanty to the Cincinnati Reds in 1906 in exchange for Al Bridwell. In September 1906, the St. Louis Browns bought him from the Reds, and the next June, the Washington Senators purchased his contract from the Browns.

He was traded mid-season by the Senators to the Tigers in 1909 for Germany Schaefer and played in his only World Series that season, batting .346 with 4 RBI in 7 games against the Pittsburgh Pirates. In 1911, Delahanty hit for his highest batting average (.339) and he had a career-high in runs batted in (94). He stayed in the major leagues until the middle of the 1912 season, having encountered illness and injuries that year that limited his productivity. He finished his playing career in the Federal League. In 1,186 career games, Delahanty had 1,159 hits with 19 home runs and 151 stolen bases.

After his baseball career, Delahanty worked for the city of Cleveland as a street paver. He died in a Cleveland hospital in 1953 after a long illness. He was buried in Calvary Cemetery in Cleveland. He was survived by a wife, Hester, and a daughter.
