= Jerry Donovan =

American baseball player (1876-1938)

- Catcher
- Born: September 3, 1876; Lock Haven, Pennsylvania, U.S.
- Died: June 27, 1938 (aged 61); St. Petersburg, Florida, U.S.
- Batted: Right Threw: Right

MLB debut
- April 12, 1906, for the Philadelphia Phillies

Last MLB appearance
- September 21, 1906, for the Philadelphia Phillies

MLB statistics
- Batting average: .199
- Home runs: 0
- Runs batted in: 15
- Stats at Baseball Reference

Teams
- Philadelphia Phillies (1906)

Jeremiah Francis Donovan (September 3, 1876 – June 27, 1938) was an American Major League Baseball catcher. He played one season in the major leagues for the Philadelphia Phillies in 1906. His brother, Tom Donovan, was a major league outfielder. He batted and threw right.

== Sources ==
- Career statistics from Baseball Reference · Baseball Reference (Minors) · Retrosheet · Baseball Almanac
