= Amos Cross =

American baseball player (1860–1888)

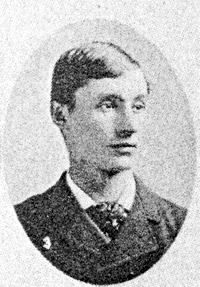
- Catcher
- Born: February 8, 1860; Milwaukee, Wisconsin, U.S.
- Died: July 16, 1888 (aged 28); Cleveland, Ohio, U.S.
- Batted: Unknown Threw: Unknown

MLB debut
- September 27, 1885, for the Louisville Colonels

Last MLB appearance
- October 8, 1887, for the Louisville Colonels

MLB statistics
- Batting average: .268
- Home runs: 1
- Runs batted in: 56
- Stats at Baseball Reference

Teams
- Louisville Colonels (1885–1887)

Amos C. Cross (February 8, 1860 – July 16, 1888) was an American Major League baseball player from 1885–1887. His main position was catcher. He played three seasons in MLB, all for the Louisville Colonels. His brothers, Lave and Frank, also played in the Major Leagues. Amos played in the minor leagues from 1883 to 1884. he died on July 16 1888 at age 28 from pneumonia in Cleveland Ohio.

== See also ==
- List of baseball players who died during their careers
