= Frank Delahanty =

American baseball player (1882–1966)

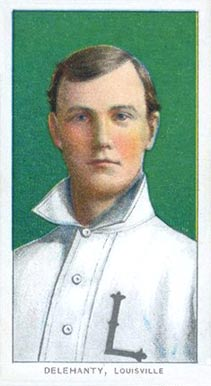
- Outfielder
- Born: December 29, 1882; Cleveland, Ohio, U.S.
- Died: July 22, 1966 (aged 83); Cleveland, Ohio, U.S.
- Batted: Right Threw: Right

MLB debut
- August 23, 1905, for the New York Highlanders

Last MLB appearance
- May 27, 1915, for the Pittsburgh Rebels

MLB statistics
- Batting average: .226
- Home runs: 5
- Runs batted in: 94
- Stats at Baseball Reference

Teams
- New York Highlanders (1905–1906); Cleveland Naps (1907); New York Highlanders (1908); Buffalo Buffeds (1914); Pittsburgh Rebels (1914–1915)

Frank George Delahanty (December 29, 1882 in Cleveland, Ohio – July 22, 1966 in Cleveland, Ohio), was an American professional baseball player who played outfield and occasional first base in the Major Leagues from 1905–1915. He would play for the New York Highlanders, Cleveland Indians, Buffalo Buffeds, and Pittsburgh Rebels. His brothers, Ed, Jim, Joe and Tom also played in the Major Leagues. Frank was the last of the Delahanty brothers active in the major leagues, with his final appearance coming in the same month (May 1915) as his brother Jim's.

Delahanty suffered a fall in February 1966, breaking his hip and wrist, requiring hospitalization. He died in the hospital in Cleveland on July 22, 1966. At the time of his death, he was the last remaining the Delahanty brother.
