= Tom Delahanty =

American baseball player (1872–1951)

- Third baseman
- Born: March 9, 1872; Cleveland, Ohio, U.S.
- Died: January 10, 1951 (aged 78); Sanford, Florida, U.S.
- Batted: Right Threw: Right

MLB debut
- September 29, 1894, for the Philadelphia Phillies

Last MLB appearance
- June 29, 1897, for the Louisville Colonels

MLB statistics
- Games played: 19
- Batting average: .239
- Hits: 16
- Stats at Baseball Reference

Teams
- Philadelphia Phillies (1894); Cleveland Spiders (1896); Pittsburgh Pirates (1896); Louisville Colonels (1897)

Thomas James Delahanty (March 9, 1872 – January 10, 1951) was an American professional baseball infielder, who played in Major League Baseball (MLB) for the Philadelphia Phillies, Cleveland Spiders, Pittsburgh Pirates, and Louisville Colonels, from 1894 to 1897. Delahanty made his Major League debut on the last game of the season for the Phillies. This appearance most likely only happened because his older brother Ed was "pestering" the Phillies to give Tom a shot.

He was the second-oldest of the five Delahanty brothers to make the Major Leagues Ed, Jim, Frank and Joe.

He is buried at All Souls Cemetery in Sanford, Florida.
