= Ed Delahanty =

American baseball player (1867–1903)

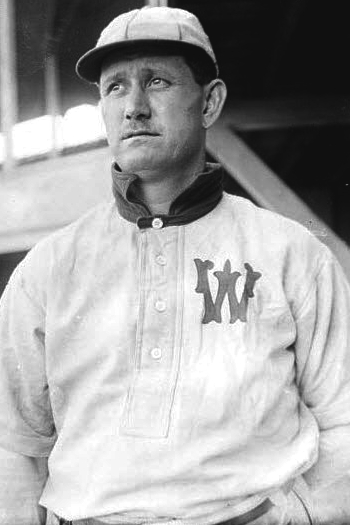
- Delahanty with the Washington Senators in 1903
- Left fielder
- Born: October 30, 1867; Cleveland, Ohio, U.S.
- Died: July 2, 1903 (aged 35); Niagara Falls, Ontario, Canada
- Batted: Right Threw: Right

MLB debut
- May 22, 1888, for the Philadelphia Quakers

Last MLB appearance
- June 25, 1903, for the Washington Senators

MLB statistics
- Batting average: .346
- Hits: 2,596
- Home runs: 101
- Runs batted in: 1,464
- Stolen bases: 455
- Stats at Baseball Reference

Teams
- Philadelphia Quakers (1888–1889); Cleveland Infants (1890); Philadelphia Phillies (1891–1901); Washington Senators (1902–1903)

Career highlights and awards
- NL batting champion (1899); 2× NL home run leader (1893, 1896); 3× NL RBI leader (1893, 1896, 1899); NL stolen base leader (1898); Hit four home runs in one game on July 13, 1896; Philadelphia Phillies jersey retired; Philadelphia Phillies Wall of Fame

Member of the National

Baseball Hall of Fame
- Induction: 1945
- Election method: Old-Timers Committee

Edward James Delahanty (October 30, 1867 – July 2, 1903), nicknamed "Big Ed", was an American professional baseball player, who spent his Major League Baseball (MLB) playing career with the Philadelphia Quakers, Cleveland Infants, Philadelphia Phillies, and Washington Senators. He was renowned as one of the game's early power hitters, and while primarily a left fielder, also spent time as an infielder. Delahanty won two batting titles, batted over .400 three times, and has the seventh-highest career batting average in MLB history. In 1945, Delahanty was elected to the Baseball Hall of Fame. Delahanty died by drowning as a result of either falling into the Niagara River or being swept over Niagara Falls, after being removed from a train for being drunk and disorderly.

Delahanty's biographer argues that:

Baseball for Irish kids was a shortcut to the American dream and to self-indulgent glory and fortune. By the mid-1880s these young Irish men dominated the sport and popularized a style of play that was termed heady, daring, and spontaneous.... [Delahanty] personified the flamboyant, exciting spectator-favorite, the Casey-at-the-bat, Irish slugger. The handsome masculine athlete who is expected to live as large as he played.

Delahanty's younger brothers, Frank, Jim, Joe, and Tom, also played in the major leagues. Their youngest brother Bill played in the minor leagues.

== Early life ==
A Cleveland, Ohio, native, Delahanty was an outfielder and powerful right-handed batter in the 1890s. Crazy Schmit, who pitched for the Giants and Orioles, said of him, "When you pitch to [Ed] Delahanty, you just want to shut your eyes, say a prayer and chuck the ball. The Lord only knows what'll happen after that." (quoted in Autumn Glory by Louis P. Masur)

Delahanty attended Cleveland's Central High School and went on to college at St. Joseph's. His baseball career started with the semipro Cleveland Shamrocks. While growing up Delahanty was neighbors with future major leaguer Tommy Leach. He then signed on to play professional baseball with Mansfield of the Ohio State League in 1887. Later in the 1887 season, Delahanty played minor league ball in Wheeling, West Virginia. Before the 1888 season, the Wheeling team sold Delahanty to the Philadelphia Phillies for $1,900. He became the most prominent member of the largest group of siblings ever to play in the major leagues: brothers Frank, Jim, Joe and Tom also spent time in the majors.

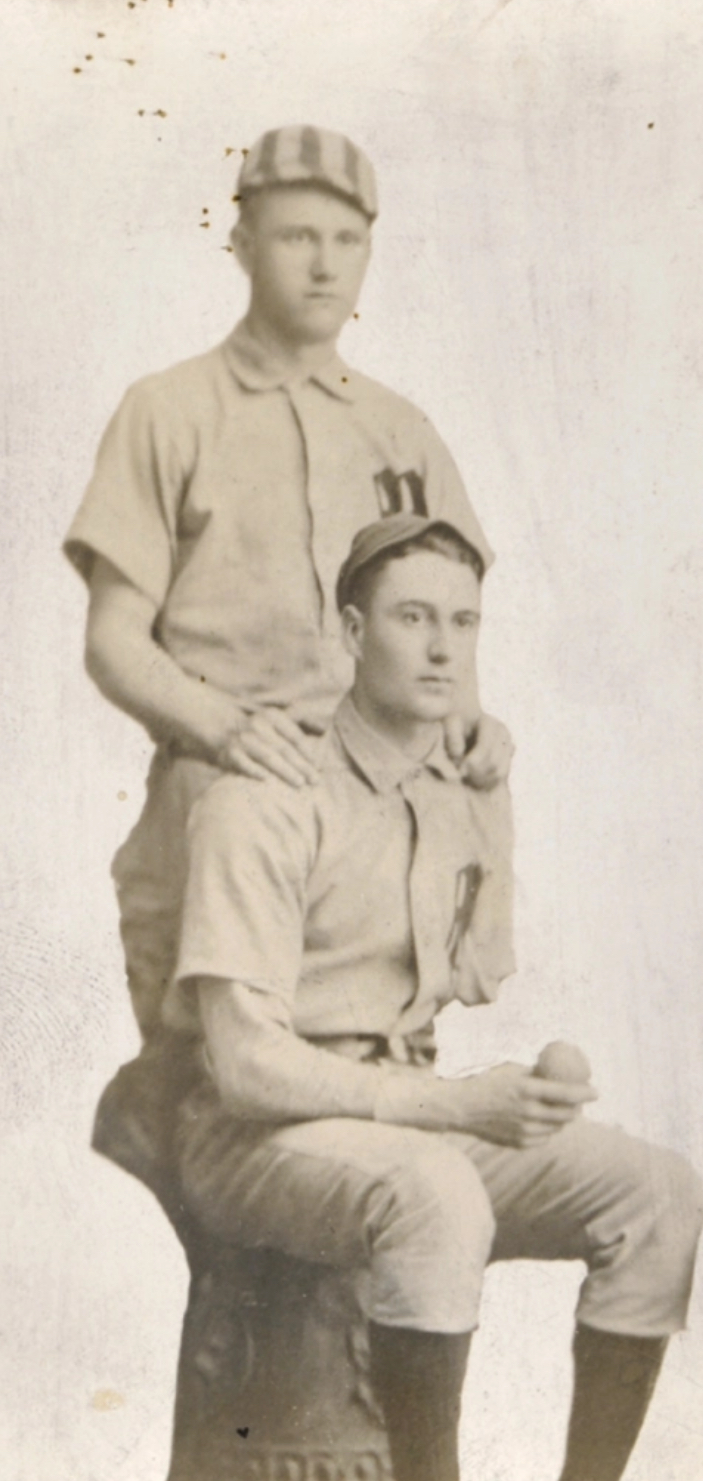
Delahanty in 1887 with teammate George England while playing for the Mansfield baseball team

== Major league career ==
=== Early career ===
The Phillies obtained Delahanty as a replacement for Charlie Ferguson. Ferguson was a pitcher who had converted to second base for his final season, but he died early in 1888 from typhoid fever. Delahanty was brought in to fill in for him at second base. He began his career on May 22, 1888, with the Philadelphia Phillies in the National League (NL), playing 74 games that season with a .228 average, 1 HR, and 31 RBI. The next year, in 56 games, he raised his average to .293.

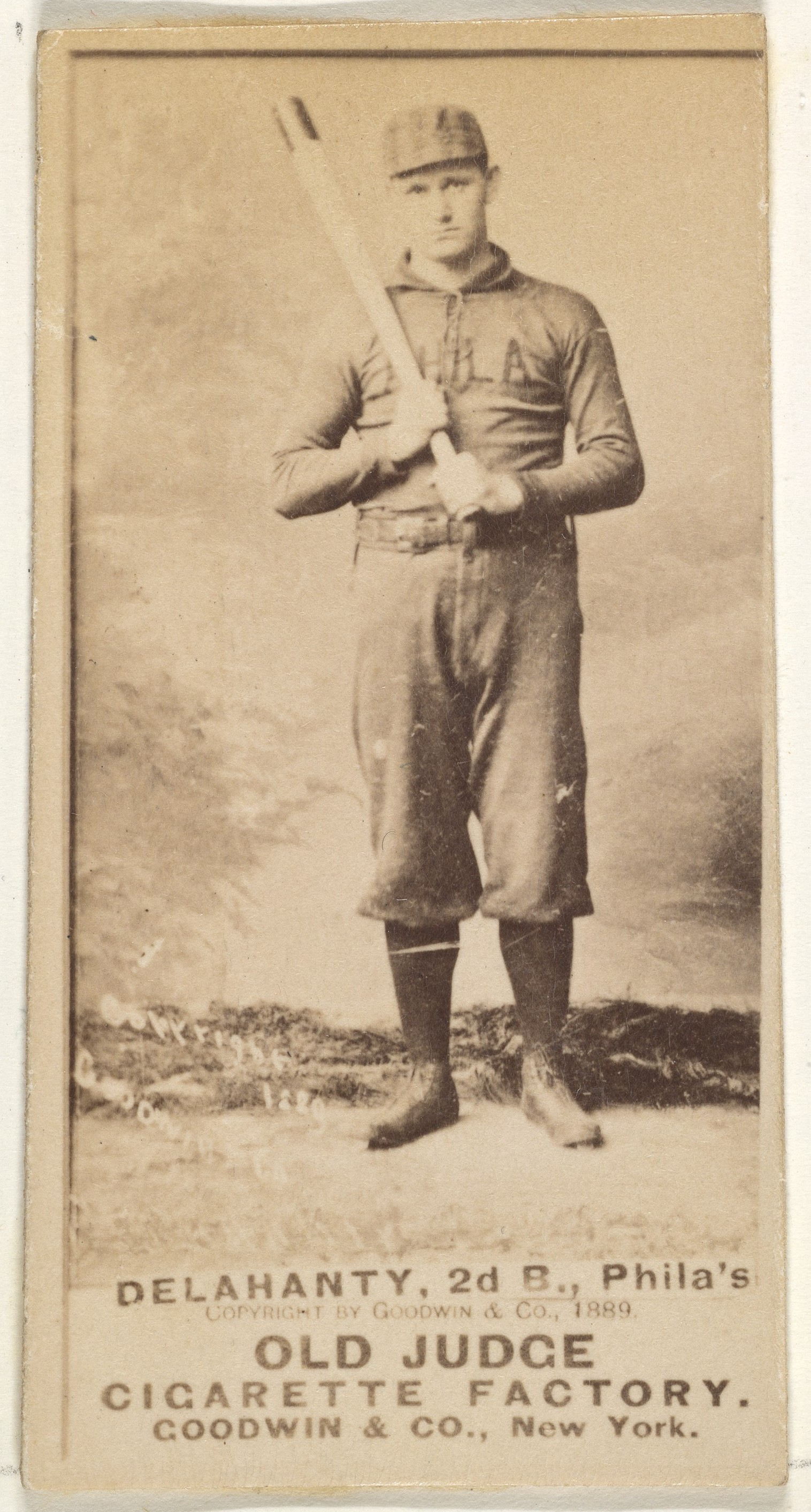
Delahanty in 1888 with the Philadelphia Quakers

In 1890, he jumped to the Players' League (PL), but returned to the Phillies the next year when that league folded. Upon rejoining the Phillies, he became the team's starting left fielder. However, his off-the-field activities and excess consumption of alcohol limited his performance. He hit .306 and tallied 6 HR and 91 RBI in 1892. During one game that season, St. Louis infielder George Pinkney charged toward home plate, expecting Delahanty to bunt; Delahanty swung and hit a ball that "appeared to have been shot from a cannon", breaking Pinkney's ankle.

That same year, Delahanty was the victim behind one of "The Most Shameful Home Runs of All Time", according to authors Bruce Nash and Allan Zullo. When Delahanty's Phillies hosted the Chicago White Stockings at Philadelphia's Huntingdon Street Grounds in July, Cap Anson hit a fly ball to center field. The ball hit a pole and landed right in the "doghouse", a little-known feature of the park that was used to store numbers for the manually run scoreboard. Delahanty tried reaching over the "doghouse" and then tried crawling down into it. He got stuck, and by the time teammate Sam Thompson had freed Delahanty from the area, Anson had crossed home plate.

=== Middle career ===
Delahanty blossomed in 1893 with a .368 average, 19 home runs, and 146 RBI. He narrowly missed the Triple Crown, as teammates Billy Hamilton and Sam Thompson led the league in batting with .380 and .370 averages respectively. While with the Phillies, Delahanty played under manager Harry Wright, the man who assembled, managed, and played center field for baseball's first fully professional team, the 1869 Cincinnati Red Stockings. Wright managed the Phillies with Delahanty for four seasons, from 1890 to 1893, with the two and their fine supporting cast leading the Phils to "first division" finishes during those years, though the team never won a pennant. Between 1894 and 1896 Delahanty compiled astonishing batting marks: .407, 4 HR, 131 RBI; .404, 11 HR, 106 RBI; .397, 13 HR, 126 RBI.

In 1894, despite his high average of .407, the batting title went to Hugh Duffy with a major league record-setting .440. The 1894 Phillies outfield had a big season, with four players averaging over .400: Delahanty (.407), Sam Thompson (.407), Billy Hamilton (.404), and spare outfielder Tuck Turner (.416). Delahanty won his first batting title in 1899 with a .410 batting average, with nine homers and 137 RBI, thus becoming the first player in major league history to hit .400 three times. Delahanty was surrounded by talent in the Philadelphia outfield. Author Bill James wrote, "Any way you cut it, the Phillies had the greatest outfield of the 19th century."

On July 13, 1896, Delahanty became the second player to hit four home runs in a game. He was the first player to do so in a losing effort. (The Phillies lost the game, 9–8.) Two of them were hit into the bleachers while the other two were inside-the-park. In 1899, Delahanty hit four doubles in the same game. He remains the only man with a four-homer game and a four-double game. The same year Delahanty collected hits in 10 consecutive at bats. He tallied six-hit games in 1890 and 1894.

=== Later career ===
After switching to the new American League (AL) in 1902, Delahanty played for the Washington Senators, hitting at a .376 mark. After the 1902 season, Delahanty commented to a reporter, "I know I am getting along in years and won't be able to last much longer in first-class baseball, therefore I am going to get all the money there is in sight... Last year I was playing with the Phillies for $3,000, this season the Washington Club gives me $4,000, and if I can get $5,000 no one can blame me for taking it."

Official Major League Baseball (MLB) and MLB Hall of Fame records credit Ed Delahanty as the AL batting title winner in 1902 with a .376 average. This made him the first player recognized as winning a batting title in both the National League (1899) and the American League (1902) until D.J. LeMahieu did it again with titles in 2016 with the Rockies, and in 2020 with the Yankees. SABR in its research did find that Nap Lajoie hit .378 in 1902, slightly besting Delahanty's .376. But the MLB concluded that Lajoie only appeared in 87 games with 371 plate appearances, which is well below the standard average of 3.1 plate appearances per scheduled game required to qualify for the batting title (that standard was set in 1957, modifying earlier games-played and at-bats requirements, and has been also retroactively applied to old records). As Delahanty logged a full season of 535 plate appearances in 1902, he thus had the highest AL (eligible) batting average in the league.Delahanty returned to the Senators for the 1903 season. He was hitting .333 with one home run and 21 RBI in 42 games that year until the incident at Niagara Falls.

== Death ==
Delahanty died when he either fell into the Niagara River or was swept over Niagara Falls on July 2, 1903. He was apparently kicked off a train by the train's conductor for being drunk and disorderly. The conductor said Delahanty was brandishing a straight razor and threatening passengers after he consumed five whiskies. After being kicked off the train, Delahanty started his way across the International Railway Bridge connecting Buffalo, New York with Fort Erie (near Niagara Falls) and fell or jumped off the bridge (some accounts maintain Delahanty was yelling about death that night). Whether Delahanty died from his plunge over the Falls or drowned on the way to the Falls is uncertain. His body was found at the bottom of Niagara Falls a week after his death.

A study of the incident appeared with the publication of July 2, 1903: The Mysterious Death of Big Ed Delahanty, by Mike Sowell (New York, Toronto, MacMillan Publishing Co., 1992). Sowell presents the evidence of a drunken accident, suicide, and even possibly a robbery-murder (there were reports of a mysterious man following Delahanty).

== Legacy ==
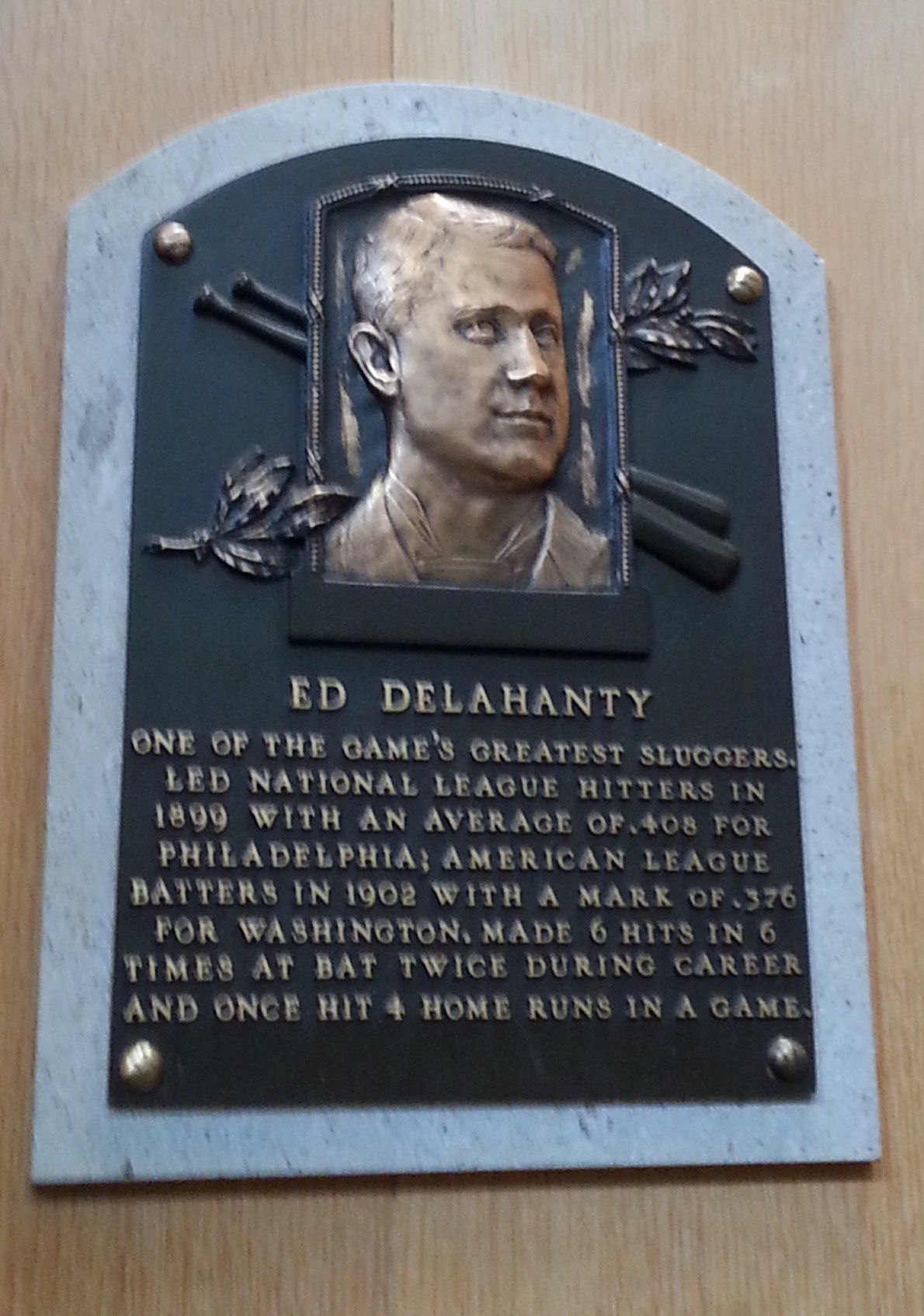
Delahanty's plaque at the Baseball Hall of Fame

In his 16 seasons with Philadelphia, Cleveland and Washington, Delahanty batted .346, with 101 HR and 1,464 RBIs, 522 doubles, 185 triples and 455 stolen bases. He also led the league in slugging percentage and runs batted in three times each, and batted over .400 three times (1894-1895, 1899). Rogers Hornsby is the only other three-time .400-hitter in National League history (1922, 1924–25). Delahanty's lifetime batting average of .346 ranks fifth all-time behind Ty Cobb (.366), Rogers Hornsby (.358), Joe Jackson (.356), and Lefty O'Doul (.349).

Towards the end of his life, John McGraw was asked how the players of the 1920s and 1930s compared to the players of his era. "Ed Delahanty was as great a hitter as I have ever seen," was his reply.

In 2008, he was memorialized by the band The Baseball Project on their album, Volume 1: Frozen Ropes and Dying Quails. The song, "The Death of Big Ed Delahanty", is a driving, punk-influenced ballad. During Delahanty's career, reporters referred to him as "Big Ed". Friends and teammates usually called him "Del". The Hamburg Marines, a German Baseball Club, named their ballpark in the Hamburg quarter Billwerder after Ed Delahanty.

== See also ==
- List of baseball players who died during their careers
- List of Major League Baseball doubles records
- List of Major League Baseball career hits leaders
- List of Major League Baseball career doubles leaders
- List of Major League Baseball career triples leaders
- List of Major League Baseball career runs scored leaders
- List of Major League Baseball career runs batted in leaders
- List of Major League Baseball career stolen bases leaders
- List of Major League Baseball batting champions
- List of Major League Baseball annual doubles leaders
- List of Major League Baseball annual triples leaders
- List of Major League Baseball annual home run leaders
- List of Major League Baseball annual runs batted in leaders
- List of Major League Baseball annual stolen base leaders
- List of Major League Baseball single-game home run leaders
- List of Major League Baseball single-game hits leaders

Achievements
Preceded by Tip O'Neill	Single season doubles record holders 1899–1922	Succeeded by Tris Speaker
Preceded by Bobby Lowe	Batters with 4 home runs in one game July 13, 1896	Succeeded by Lou Gehrig
