= Pittsburgh Rebels all-time roster =

List of baseball players

The following is a list of players and who appeared in at least one game for the Pittsburgh Rebels franchise of the Federal League from 1914 through 1915.

== Keys ==
Abbreviations
Name	Name of the player by official records
Position	Position that player played in the field
Seasons played	The seasons played for this franchise by the player
§	Indicates that player was a player-manager

Position
C	Catcher	1B	First baseman
2B	Second baseman	3B	Third baseman
SS	Shortstop	IF	Infielder
LF	Left fielder	CF	Center fielder
RF	Right fielder	OF	Outfielder
SP	Starting pitcher	RP	Relief pitcher

== List of players ==
Player	Position	Seasons	Notes	Ref
Willie Adams				
Frank Allen				
Cy Barger				
Marty Berghammer				
Claude Berry				
Medric Boucher				
Hugh Bradley				
Al Braithwood				
Sandy Burk				
Howie Camnitz				
Felix Chouinard				
Ralph Comstock				
Bob Coulson				
Frank Delahanty				
Walt Dickson				
Bunny Hearn				
Ed Henderson				
Ed Holly				
Davy Jones				
Jim Kelly				
Orie Kerlin				
Doc Kerr				
Elmer Knetzer				
Ed Konetchy				
George LeClair				
Ed Lennox				
Jack Lewis				
Frank Madden				
Ralph Mattis				
Tex McDonald				
Mike Menosky				
Johnny Miljus				
Mike Mowrey				
Paddy O'Connor				
Rebel Oakes §				
Cy Rheam				
Skipper Roberts				
Clint Rogge				
Jimmie Savage				
Jim Scott				
Mysterious Walker				
Al Wickland	OF	1915		
Steve Yerkes				
