= 1915 Pittsburgh Rebels season =

1915 Pittsburgh Rebels
- League: Federal League
- Ballpark: Exposition Park
- City: Pittsburgh, Pennsylvania
- Record: 86–67 (.562)
- League place: 3rd
- Owners: Edward Gwinner, C. B. Comstock
- Managers: Rebel Oakes

The 1915 Pittsburgh Rebels' season was a season in American baseball. The Rebels finished in third place in the Federal League, just one-half game behind the Chicago Whales and St. Louis Terriers.

== Regular season ==
=== Season standings ===
Federal League
Team	W	L	Pct.	GB	Home	Road
Chicago Whales	86	66	.566	—	44‍–‍32	42‍–‍34
St. Louis Terriers	87	67	.565	—	43‍–‍34	44‍–‍33
Pittsburgh Rebels	86	67	.562	½	45‍–‍31	41‍–‍36
Kansas City Packers	81	72	.529	5½	46‍–‍31	35‍–‍41
Newark Peppers	80	72	.526	6	40‍–‍39	40‍–‍33
Buffalo Blues	74	78	.487	12	37‍–‍40	37‍–‍38
Brooklyn Tip-Tops	70	82	.461	16	34‍–‍40	36‍–‍42
Baltimore Terrapins	47	107	.305	40	24‍–‍51	23‍–‍56

=== Record vs. opponents ===
1915 Federal League record Sources:
Team	BAL	BKF	BUF	CWH	KC	NWK	PRB	SLT
Baltimore	—	7–15	8–14	9–13	4–18	6–16	5–17	8–14
Brooklyn	15–7	—	9–11	7–15	11–11	12–10	9–13	7–15–1
Buffalo	14–8	11–9	—	8–14	11–11	11–11	9–13	10–12–1
Chicago	13–9	15–7	14–8	—	11–11	10–10–1	12–10–1	11–11–1
Kansas City	18–4	11–11	11–11	11–11	—	11–11	8–13	11–11
Newark	16–6	10–12	11–11	10–10–1	11–11	—	12–10–1	10–12–1
Pittsburgh	17–5	13–9	13–9	10–12–1	13–8	10–12–1	—	10–12–1
St. Louis	14–8	15–7–1	12–10–1	11–11–1	11–11	12–10–1	12–10–1	—

=== Roster ===
1915 Pittsburgh Rebels
Roster
Pitchers: Frank Allen; Cy Barger; Al Braithwood; Sandy Burk; Howie Camnitz; Ralph Comstock; Walt Dickson; Bunny Hearn; Elmer Knetzer; George LeClair; Johnny Miljus; Clint Rogge	Catchers: Claude Berry; Orie Kerlin; Paddy O'Connor; Infielders: Marty Berghammer; Ed Holly; Ed Konetchy; Ed Lennox; Jack Lewis; Mike Mowrey; Steve Yerkes	Outfielders: Hugh Bradley; Frank Delahanty; Davy Jones; Jim Kelly; Mike Menosky; Rebel Oakes; Cy Rheam; Jimmie Savage; Al Wickland	Manager: Rebel Oakes

== Player stats ==
=== Batting ===
==== Starters by position ====
Note: Pos = Position; G = Games played; AB = At bats; H = Hits; Avg. = Batting average; HR = Home runs; RBI = Runs batted in

Pos	Player	G	AB	H	Avg.	HR	RBI
C	Claude Berry	100	292	56	.192	1	26
1B	Ed Konetchy	152	576	181	.314	10	93
2B	Steve Yerkes	121	434	125	.288	1	49
SS	Marty Berghammer	132	469	114	.243	0	33
3B	Mike Mowrey	151	521	146	.280	1	49
OF	Al Wickland	110	389	117	.301	1	30
OF	Rebel Oakes	153	580	161	.278	0	82
OF	Jim Kelly	148	524	154	.294	4	50

==== Other batters ====
Note: G = Games played; AB = At bats; H = Hits; Avg. = Batting average; HR = Home runs; RBI = Runs batted in

Player	G	AB	H	Avg.	HR	RBI
Jack Lewis	82	231	61	.264	0	26
Paddy O'Connor	70	219	50	.228	0	16
Cy Rheam	34	69	12	.174	1	5
Hugh Bradley	26	66	18	.273	0	6
Ed Lennox	55	53	16	.302	1	9
Davy Jones	14	49	16	.327	0	4
Ed Holly	16	42	11	.262	0	5
Frank Delahanty	14	42	10	.238	0	3
Mike Menosky	17	21	2	.095	0	1
Jimmie Savage	14	21	3	.143	0	0
Orie Kerlin	3	1	0	.000	0	0

=== Pitching ===
==== Starting pitchers ====
Note: G = Games pitched; IP = Innings pitched; W = Wins; L = Losses; ERA = Earned run average; SO = Strikeouts

Player	G	IP	W	L	ERA	SO
Frank Allen	41	283.1	23	13	2.51	127
Elmer Knetzer	41	279.0	18	14	2.58	120
Clint Rogge	37	254.1	17	11	2.55	93
Bunny Hearn	29	175.2	6	11	3.38	49
Sandy Burk	2	18.0	2	0	1.00	9

==== Other pitchers ====
Note: G = Games pitched; IP = Innings pitched; W = Wins; L = Losses; ERA = Earned run average; SO = Strikeouts

Player	G	IP	W	L	ERA	SO
Cy Barger	34	153.0	9	8	2.29	47
Walt Dickson	27	96.2	7	5	4.19	36
Ralph Comstock	12	52.2	3	3	3.25	18
George LeClair	14	45.2	1	2	3.35	10
Howie Camnitz	4	20.0	0	0	4.50	6

==== Relief pitchers ====
Note: G = Games pitched; W = Wins; L = Losses; SV = Saves; ERA = Earned run average; SO = Strikeouts

Player	G	W	L	SV	ERA	SO
Al Braithwood	2	0	0	0	0.00	2
Johnny Miljus	1	0	0	0	0.00	0
