= 1914 Pittsburgh Rebels season =

1914 Pittsburgh Rebels
- League: Federal League
- Ballpark: Exposition Park
- City: Pittsburgh, Pennsylvania
- Record: 64–86 (.427)
- League place: 7th
- Owners: Edward Gwinner, C. B. Comstock
- Managers: Doc Gessler, Rebel Oakes

The 1914 Pittsburgh Rebels season was a season in American baseball. The Rebels finished in 7th place in the Federal League, 22½ games behind the Indianapolis Hoosiers.

== Regular season ==
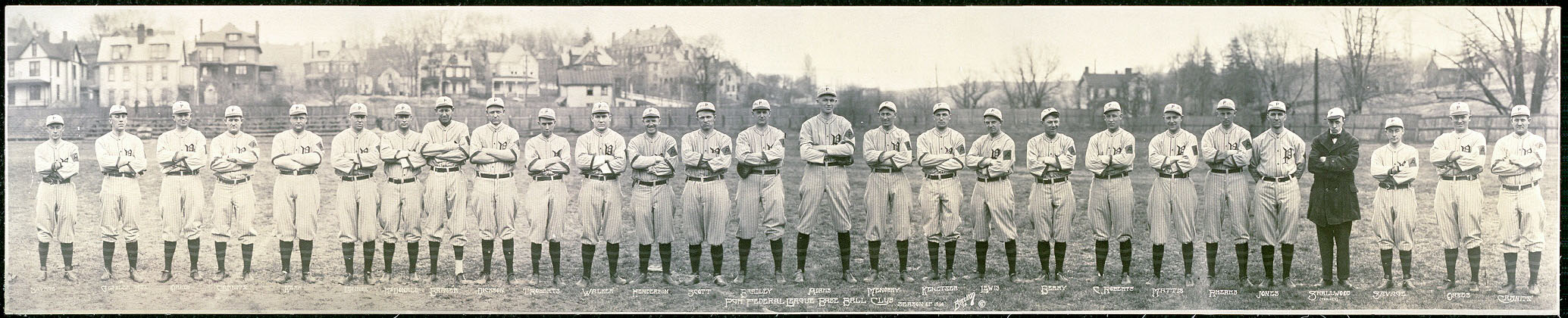
The 1914 Pittsburgh Rebels

=== Season standings ===
Federal League
Team	W	L	Pct.	GB	Home	Road
Indianapolis Hoosiers	88	65	.575	—	53‍–‍23	35‍–‍42
Chicago Federals	87	67	.565	1½	43‍–‍34	44‍–‍33
Baltimore Terrapins	84	70	.545	4½	53‍–‍26	31‍–‍44
Buffalo Buffeds	80	71	.530	7	47‍–‍29	33‍–‍42
Brooklyn Tip-Tops	77	77	.500	11½	47‍–‍32	30‍–‍45
Kansas City Packers	67	84	.444	20	37‍–‍36	30‍–‍48
Pittsburgh Rebels	64	86	.427	22½	37‍–‍37	27‍–‍49
St. Louis Terriers	62	89	.411	25	32‍–‍43	30‍–‍46

=== Record vs. opponents ===
1914 Federal League record Sources:
Team	BAL	BKF	BUF	CWH	IND	KC	PRB	SLT
Baltimore	—	9–13	14–8–1	12–10	10–12–1	12–10	10–12–2	17–5–1
Brooklyn	13–9	—	11–11–1	9–13	3–19	11–11–1	17–5–1	13–9
Buffalo	8–14–1	11–11–1	—	10–12–1	11–10	12–10–1	13–7	15–7
Chicago	10–12	13–9	12–10–1	—	13–9–1	14–8	12–10	13–9–1
Indianapolis	12–10–2	19–3	10–11	9–13–1	—	13–9–1	12–10	13–9
Kansas City	10–12	11–11	10–12–1	8–14	9–13–1	—	11–10	8–12
Pittsburgh	12–10–2	5–17	7–13–1	10–12	10–12	10–11	—	10–11–1
St. Louis	5–17–1	9–13	7–15	9–13–1	9–13	12–8	11–10	—

=== Roster ===
1914 Pittsburgh Rebels
Roster
Pitchers: Willie Adams; Frank Allen; Cy Barger; Howie Camnitz; Walt Dickson; Ed Henderson; Elmer Knetzer; George LeClair; Mysterious Walker	Catchers: Claude Berry; Doc Kerr; Frank Madden; Skipper Roberts; Infielders: Hugh Bradley; Felix Chouinard; Ed Holly; Ed Lennox; Jack Lewis; Cy Rheam; Jim Scott; Steve Yerkes	Outfielders: Bob Coulson; Frank Delahanty; Davy Jones; Ralph Mattis; Tex McDonald; Mike Menosky; Rebel Oakes; Jimmie Savage; Other batters: Medric Boucher	Manager: Doc Gessler; Rebel Oakes

== Player stats ==
=== Batting ===
==== Starters by position ====
Note: Pos = Position; G = Games played; AB = At bats; H = Hits; Avg. = Batting average; HR = Home runs; RBI = Runs batted in

Pos	Player	G	AB	H	Avg.	HR	RBI
C	Claude Berry	124	411	98	.238	2	36
1B	Hugh Bradley	118	427	131	.307	0	61
2B	Jack Lewis	117	394	92	.234	1	48
SS	Ed Holly	100	350	86	.246	0	26
3B	Ed Lennox	124	430	134	.312	11	84
OF	Jimmie Savage	132	479	136	.284	1	26
OF	Rebel Oakes	145	571	178	.312	7	75
OF	Davy Jones	97	352	96	.273	2	24

==== Other batters ====
Note: G = Games played; AB = At bats; H = Hits; Avg. = Batting average; HR = Home runs; RBI = Runs batted in

Player	G	AB	H	Avg.	HR	RBI
Tex McDonald	67	223	71	.318	3	29
Cy Rheam	73	214	45	.210	0	20
Frank Delahanty	41	159	38	.239	1	7
Steve Yerkes	39	142	48	.338	1	25
Mike Menosky	68	140	37	.264	2	9
Skipper Roberts	52	94	22	.234	1	8
Ralph Mattis	36	85	21	.247	0	8
Doc Kerr	42	71	17	.239	1	7
Bob Coulson	18	64	13	.203	0	3
Felix Chouinard	9	30	9	.300	1	3
Jim Scott	8	24	6	.250	0	1
Frank Madden	2	2	1	.500	0	1
Medric Boucher	1	1	0	.000	0	0

=== Pitching ===
==== Starting pitchers ====
Note: G = Games pitched; IP = Innings pitched; W = Wins; L = Losses; ERA = Earned run average; SO = Strikeouts

Player	G	IP	W	L	ERA	SO
Elmer Knetzer	37	272.0	20	12	2.88	146
Howie Camnitz	36	262.0	14	19	3.23	82
Walt Dickson	40	256.2	9	19	3.16	63
Cy Barger	33	228.1	10	16	4.34	70
Frank Allen	1	7.0	1	0	5.14	3

==== Other pitchers ====
Note: G = Games pitched; IP = Innings pitched; W = Wins; L = Losses; ERA = Earned run average; SO = Strikeouts

Player	G	IP	W	L	ERA	SO
Mysterious Walker	35	169.1	4	16	4.31	79
George LeClair	22	103.1	5	2	4.01	49
Ed Henderson	6	16.0	0	1	3.94	4

==== Relief pitchers ====
Note: G = Games pitched; W = Wins; L = Losses; SV = Saves; ERA = Earned run average; SO = Strikeouts

Player	G	W	L	SV	ERA	SO
Willie Adams	15	1	1	2	3.74	14
