= Tulsa Oilers (baseball) =

- 1905–1976; (1905–1908, 1910, 1914, 1919–1929, 1932–1942, 1946–1976); Tulsa, Oklahoma
Team logo
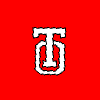
Cap insignia

Minor league affiliations
- Class: Triple-A (1966–1976)
- League: American Association (1969–1976); Pacific Coast League (1966–1968); Texas League (1933–1942, 1946–1965); Western League (1919–1929, 1932); Western Association (1910, 1914); Oklahoma–Kansas League (1908); Oklahoma–Arkansas–Kansas League (1907); South Central League (1906); Missouri Valley League (1905)

Major league affiliations
- Team: St. Louis Cardinals (1959–1976); Philadelphia Phillies (1957–1958); Chicago Cubs (1956); Cleveland Indians (1955); Cincinnati Reds (1948–1954); Chicago Cubs (1940–1942, 1946–1947); Pittsburgh Pirates (1932)

Minor league titles
- Dixie Series titles (1): 1936
- League titles (15): 1919; 1920; 1922; 1927; 1928; 1929; 1932; 1936; 1949; 1960; 1962; 1963; 1968; 1973; 1974

Team data
- Name: Tulsa Oilers
- Ballpark: Oiler Park (1934–1976); Fairgrounds Park (1932–1934) McNulty Park (1919–1929) others (1905–1917)

The Tulsa Oilers, located in Tulsa, Oklahoma, were a minor league baseball team that existed on-and-off in multiple leagues from 1905 to 1976. For most of their history, they played at Oiler Park, which opened on July 11, 1934, and was located on the Tulsa County Fairgrounds at 15th Street and Sandusky Avenue.

== History ==
=== Early years ===
In 1905, the Oilers were part of the Missouri Valley League. They finished 44–58 under manager Charley Shafft. The Missouri Valley League folded after 1905, and the Oilers became a charter member of the South Central League.

Under managers Frank Smith and Bill Rupp, the Oilers finished the 1906 season with a 45–42 record. The League folded, and the Oilers played in the Oklahoma–Arkansas–Kansas League in 1907. They finished with a 37–60 record, under Hall of Fame manager Jake Beckley. The Oklahoma–Arkansas–Kansas League saw two teams leave, so in 1908 the Oilers played in the Oklahoma–Kansas League, which was just the aforementioned Oklahoma–Arkansas–Kansas League minus a couple teams. They finished with the second best record in the league – 69–55 under managers Harry B. "Deacon" White and Stu McBirney. The league folded after only one year of existence as well.

The Tulsa Oilers did not organize in 1909. However, in 1910, they played in the Western Association. On July 22, the Tulsa Oilers team disbanded.

From 1911 to 1913, the Tulsa Oilers were not involved in organized baseball. However, in 1914 they rejoined the Western Association, leading the league with a 74–49 record under manager Howard Price. Even after such an impressive season, the Oilers disbanded again, and baseball would not be played under that name until 1919. (Until 1917 Tulsa had a team in the Western Association called the Tulsa Producers.)

=== Western League ===
In 1919, the Oilers joined the Western League, where they played from 1919 until 1929, and in 1932. Their performance during those years can be seen in the following chart.

| Year | League | Class | Record | Finish | Manager | Playoffs |
|---|---|---|---|---|---|---|
| 1919 | Western League | A | 77-63 | 2nd | Spencer Abbott | League Champs |
| 1920 | Western League | A | 92-61 | 1st | Spencer Abbott | none League Champs |
| 1921 | Western League | A | 65-103 | 8th | Jimmy Burke / Bill Clymer | none |
| 1922 | Western League | A | 103-64 | 1st | Jack Lelivelt | none League Champs |
| 1923 | Western League | A | 101-67 | 2nd | Jack Lelivelt | none |
| 1924 | Western League | A | 98-69 | 3rd | Jack Lelivelt | none |
| 1925 | Western League | A | 75-91 | 7th | Lyman Lamb / Marty Berghammer | none |
| 1926 | Western League | A | 86-78 | 4th | Marty Berghammer | none |
| 1927 | Western League | A | 101-53 | 1st | Marty Berghammer | none League Champs |
| 1928 | Western League | A | 96-69 | 2nd | Marty Berghammer | League Champs |
| 1929 | Western League | A | 95-66 | 1st | Marty Berghammer / Nick Allen | none League Champs |
| 1932 | Western League | A | 98-48 | 1st | Art Griggs | League Champs |

From 1922 to 1924, Oilers star Lyman Lamb hit 68, 71 and 100 doubles, respectively – the latter of which is a minor league record.

In 1930, McNulty Park was declared unsuitable by the city. The team opted to move Topeka, Kansas for a spell while plans for a replacement were drawn up. In 1930 and 1931, they were known as the Topeka Senators. They returned to Tulsa in 1932, temporarily playing at Fairgrounds Park.

Although 1932 was the Oilers' final season in the Western League, it was also the first season in which they were actually affiliated with a Major League team – the Pittsburgh Pirates. That affiliation lasted that year only, however. The 1932 Oilers were recognized as number 83 on Minor League Baseball's list of the 100 greatest minor league teams of all time.

=== Texas League ===
From 1933 to 1942, the Oilers played in the Texas League. In 1936, they won the league championship and the Dixie Series, a postseason interleague championship between the winners of the Southern Association and the Texas League. From 1940 to 1942, they were affiliated with the Chicago Cubs. The Texas League was shut down from 1943 to 1945 due to World War II, but when it started up again in 1946, the Oilers again played in the league until 1965. In 1946 and 1947, they were affiliated with the Cubs, but in 1948 they became affiliated with the Cincinnati Reds. They stayed affiliated with the Reds until 1954. In 1955, they were a Cleveland Indians affiliate; in 1956, they were again a Cubs affiliate. From 1957 to 1958, they were a Philadelphia Phillies affiliate. For the rest of their existence, they were a St. Louis Cardinals affiliate.

In their second year in the Texas League, the Oilers got a new home, Texas League Park. However, it was not well maintained over the years; its dilapidated condition was obvious as early as the 1950s. In 1961, the team was nearly moved to Albuquerque partly due to the stadium's poor state of repair, but A. Ray Smith bought out the previous owner and heavily renovated the park, renaming it Oiler Park. The following shows the Oilers' performance during their years in the Texas League:

| Year | League | Class | Record | Finish | Manager | Playoffs |
|---|---|---|---|---|---|---|
| 1933 | Texas League | A | 65-86 | 6th | Art Griggs | |
| 1934 | Texas League | A | 77-75 | 5th | Jake Atz | |
| 1935 | Texas League | A | 82-79 | 4th | Art Griggs | Lost in 1st round |
| 1936 | Texas League | A1 | 80-74 | 3rd | Marty McManus | League Champs |
| 1937 | Texas League | A1 | 89-69 | 2nd | Bruce Connatser | Lost in 1st round |
| 1938 | Texas League | A1 | 86-75 | 4th | Bruce Connatser | Lost in 1st round |
| 1939 | Texas League | A1 | 78-82 | 6th | Bruce Connatser(40–42)/Stanley Schino(46–40) | |
| 1940 | Texas League | A1 | 76-82 | 5th | Roy Johnson | |
| 1941 | Texas League | A1 | 86-66 | 2nd | Roy Johnson | Lost League Finals |
| 1942 | Texas League | A1 | 76-75 | 6th | Roy Johnson | |
| 1946 | Texas League | AA | 84-69 | 4th | Gus Mancuso | Lost in 1st round |
| 1947 | Texas League | AA | 79-75 | 4th | Gus Mancuso | Lost in 1st round |
| 1948 | Texas League | AA | 93-63 | 2nd | Al Vincent | Lost League Finals |
| 1949 | Texas League | AA | 90-64 | 2nd | Al Vincent | League Champs |
| 1950 | Texas League | AA | 83-69 | 3rd | Al Vincent | Lost League Finals |
| 1951 | Texas League | AA | 67-94 | 7th | Al Vincent | |
| 1952 | Texas League | AA | 78-83 | 6th | Joe Schultz | |
| 1953 | Texas League | AA | 83-71 | 2nd | Joe Schultz | Lost League Finals |
| 1954 | Texas League | AA | 78-83 | 6th | Joe Schultz | |
| 1955 | Texas League | AA | 86-75 | 5th | Dutch Meyer (7–17) / Joe Macko (4–0)/ Hank Schenz (75–58) | |
| 1956 | Texas League | AA | 77-77 | 4th | Al Widmar | Lost in 1st round |
| 1957 | Texas League | AA | 75-79 | 4th | Al Widmar | Lost in 1st round |
| 1958 | Texas League | AA | 71-81 | 7th | Al Widmar (45–54) / Jim Fanning (26–27) | |
| 1959 | Texas League | AA | 77-67 | 3rd | Vern Benson | Lost in 1st round |
| 1960 | Texas League | AA | 76-68 | 3rd | Vern Benson | League Champs |
| 1961 | Texas League | AA | 83-55 | 2nd | Whitey Kurowski | Lost in 1st round |
| 1962 | Texas League | AA | 77-63 | 2nd | Whitey Kurowski | League Champs |
| 1963 | Texas League | AA | 74-66 | 3rd | Grover Resinger | League Champs |
| 1964 | Texas League | AA | 79-61 | 2nd | Grover Resinger | Lost League Finals |
| 1965 | Texas League | AA | 81-60 | 1st | Vern Rapp | Lost League Finals |

=== AAA years ===
In 1966, the Oilers moved up to AAA baseball as part of the Pacific Coast League. In their first year, they won the Eastern Division, then lost the championship series to the Seattle Angels, 4 games to 3. The following year, future Hall of Famer Warren Spahn took over as manager; he would ultimately become the winningest manager in Oilers history. After a poor 1967 season, in 1968 the Oilers had one of their best seasons ever, winning the Eastern Division, then winning the PCL championship series 4 games to 1 over the Spokane Indians. Oiler outfielder Jim Hicks was named MVP of the PCL.

| 1966 | Pacific Coast League | AAA | 85-62 | 1st | Charlie Metro | Lost League Playoff |
| 1967 | Pacific Coast League | AAA | 65-79 | 11th | Warren Spahn | |
| 1968 | Pacific Coast League | AAA | 95-53 | 1st | Warren Spahn | League Champs |

During their final eight years of existence, the Oilers were members of the American Association. They won the league championship twice. In 1973, the Oilers led the West Division, then won the league playoff 4 games to 3 over the Iowa Oaks. The Oilers went on to play in the 1973 Junior World Series, where they lost 4 games to 1 to the Pawtucket Red Sox. The Oilers repeated as league champions in 1974, again winning the West Division and then beating the Indianapolis Indians 4 games to 3. (There was no Junior World Series that year.) The following chart lists their performance during their final eight years of existence:

| 1969 | American Association | AAA | 79-61 | 2nd | Warren Spahn | none |
| 1970 | American Association | AAA | 70-70 | 5th | Warren Spahn | |
| 1971 | American Association | AAA | 64-76 | 7th | Warren Spahn / Gary Geiger | |
| 1972 | American Association | AAA | 78-62 | 3rd | Jack Krol | |
| 1973 | American Association | AAA | 68-67 | 3rd | Jack Krol | League Champs |
| 1974 | American Association | AAA | 76-58 | 2nd | Ken Boyer | League Champs |
| 1975 | American Association | AAA | 73-63 | 3rd | Ken Boyer | |
| 1976 | American Association | AAA | 65-70 | 5th | Ken Boyer | |

Through their many years of existence, the Oilers had had many big names both play for and manage the team. Jake Beckley, Gus Weyhing, Deacon White, Gus Mancuso, Marty McManus, Whitey Kurowski, Warren Spahn and Ken Boyer all managed for the team at one point or another. Steve Carlton, Mike Torrez, Ted Simmons, Nelson Briles, Jerry Reuss, Keith Hernandez, Bob Forsch, Dal Maxvill and Mike Easler all played for the team.

By the end of the 1976 season, the Oilers were again faced with the deteriorating condition of Oiler Park. Smith had poured significant resources into keeping the park at something approaching Triple-A standards. However, it was obvious that the park was nearing the end of its useful life. Smith was unable to get commitments for a new park, or at least further public or private funding for badly needed upgrades to Oiler Park until a replacement could be built. Finally, he moved the team to New Orleans after the 1976 season. For one year they were the New Orleans Pelicans, then moved on to Springfield, Illinois, and in 1982 to Louisville, Kentucky, where the team set minor league attendance records and is now called the Louisville Bats.

Tulsa was not without baseball for long, however; shortly after the Oilers announced they were leaving town, the Lafayette Drillers of the Texas League moved to Tulsa as the Tulsa Drillers. The Drillers have been a mainstay of the Texas League ever since; they played at Oiler Park from 1977 to 1980 until Robert B. Sutton Stadium, later Tulsa County Stadium and then Drillers Stadium, opened in 1981. They now play at ONEOK Field.
