= Orie Kerlin =

American baseball player (1891-1974)

- Catcher
- Born: January 23, 1891; Summerfield, Louisiana
- Died: October 29, 1974 (aged 83); Corpus Christi, Texas
- Batted: Left Threw: Right

MLB debut
- June 6, 1915, for the Pittsburgh Rebels

Last MLB appearance
- September 1, 1915, for the Pittsburgh Rebels

MLB statistics
- Games played: 3
- At-bats: 1
- Hits: 0
- Stats at Baseball Reference

Teams
- Pittsburgh Rebels (1915)

Orie Milton Kerlin (January 23, 1891 – October 29, 1974), known also as Cy Kerlin, was a professional baseball player for one season (1915). During that season, he played with the Major League Baseball (MLB) Pittsburgh Rebels of the Federal League. Kerlin appeared in three games with the Rebels, never getting a hit in one at-bat. Defensively, he played the catcher position. He batted left-handed while throwing right. During his playing career, he stood at 5 feet 7 inches (170 cm) and weighed 149 pounds (68 kg). Before turning professional, Kerlin attended Louisiana State University. After his baseball career was over, Kerlin returned to his home-town of Homer, Louisiana, and worked at various jobs, including a merchant, undertaker and president of a sawmill.

== Biography ==
Orie Kerlin was born on January 23, 1891, in Summerfield, Louisiana, to Marcellus L. and Mary A. Kerlin of Louisiana and Mississippi, respectively. Marcellus Kerlin worked as a merchant in a hardware store. Orie Kerlin had seven siblings: sisters Faye, Christeen, and Dorothy; and brothers William, Douglas, Brock, and Cellers. By 1900, the Kerlin family was living in Homer. Orie Kerlin enrolled at Louisiana State University in 1910. He left the school five years later, in 1915.

Kerlin started playing baseball early in his life. The Gazette Times reported that Kerlin played semi-professional baseball Texas for a few years. They also reported that he played a few games in the Texas League. In December 1914, Kerlin was signed by the Pittsburgh Rebels of the Federal League, a newly formed circuit in Major League Baseball. Kerlin was discovered by Pittsburgh's manager, Rebel Oakes, who lived in the same town as Kerlin, Homer. The transaction was not officially announced until spring training in 1915. Kerlin was used as Pittsburgh's third catcher, behind Claude Berry and Paddy O'Connor. Oakes described Kerlin as being "fast as lightning, a fair batter, and a half-decent catcher".

Early in the 1915 season, Kerlin suffered an injury to his finger, causing him to miss two days of practice with the Pittsburgh Rebels. During the season, The Pittsburgh Press commented that while Kerlin showed promise as a catcher, he was just too ripe and young to receive the bulk of Pittsburgh's catching duties. Frank G. Menke of the International News Service stated that Kerlin was a "coming wonder" and that he could "hit, throw, and catch in big-league fashion". Kerlin made his MLB debut mid-season on June 6, 1915, against the Chicago Whales. His second game came on July 8, against the St. Louis Terriers. He made his final MLB appearance on September 1. Over his three games with Pittsburgh, he went hitless in one at-bat. In the field, Kerlin played all three of his games at catcher, making no errors and allowing one passed ball.

By 1920, Kerlin was living with his parents back in Homer. He worked at Fomby Hardware Store in Homer with his father. A few years later, Kerlin worked as the town undertaker. He was also the president of the local sawmill. By 1930, he was married to Lillian Kerlin of Louisiana; they had two children, daughters June and Marthe.

Kerlin died on October 29, 1974, in Corpus Christi, Texas, although some sources state he died in Shreveport, Louisiana. He was buried at Arlington Cemetery in Homer.
