= Braceville, Illinois =

Braceville
- Village
- Location of Braceville in Grundy & Will Counties, Illinois.
- Coordinates: 41°14′10″N 88°14′15″W
- Country: United States
- State: Illinois
- County: Grundy, Will

Area
  - Total: 3.34 sq mi (8.65 km^{2})
  - Land: 3.11 sq mi (8.06 km^{2})
  - Water: 0.23 sq mi (0.59 km^{2})
- Elevation: 594 ft (181 m)

Population (2020)
  - Total: 724
  - Density: 232.7/sq mi (89.85/km^{2})
- Time zone: UTC-6 (CST)
  - Summer (DST): UTC-5 (CDT)
- Zip code: 60407
- Area codes: 815 & 779
- FIPS code: 17-07640
- GNIS feature ID: 2398160
- Website: www.villageofbraceville.gov

Braceville is a village in Grundy County, Illinois, United States, with a portion in Will County. The population was 724 at the 2020 census.

== History ==
Braceville was founded under the name "Sulphur Springs" by Reverend L. S. Robbins in 1834. In 1848, after Robbin's death, the town elected its first official supervisor, B. R. Dowd, who changed the name to Braceville after his home town of Braceville Township, Ohio. When coal was discovered in the region, residents became interested in the mining industry. However, no mines have ever been opened, and gradually, the town shifted its focus on other industries. The population has fluctuated over time, but is now growing at a steady rate.

== Geography ==
According to the 2021 census gazetteer files, Braceville has a total area of 3.34 square miles (8.65 km^{2}), of which 3.11 square miles (8.05 km^{2}) (or 93.17%) is land and 0.23 square miles (0.60 km^{2}) (or 6.83%) is water.

=== Illinois Route 129 Bridge ===
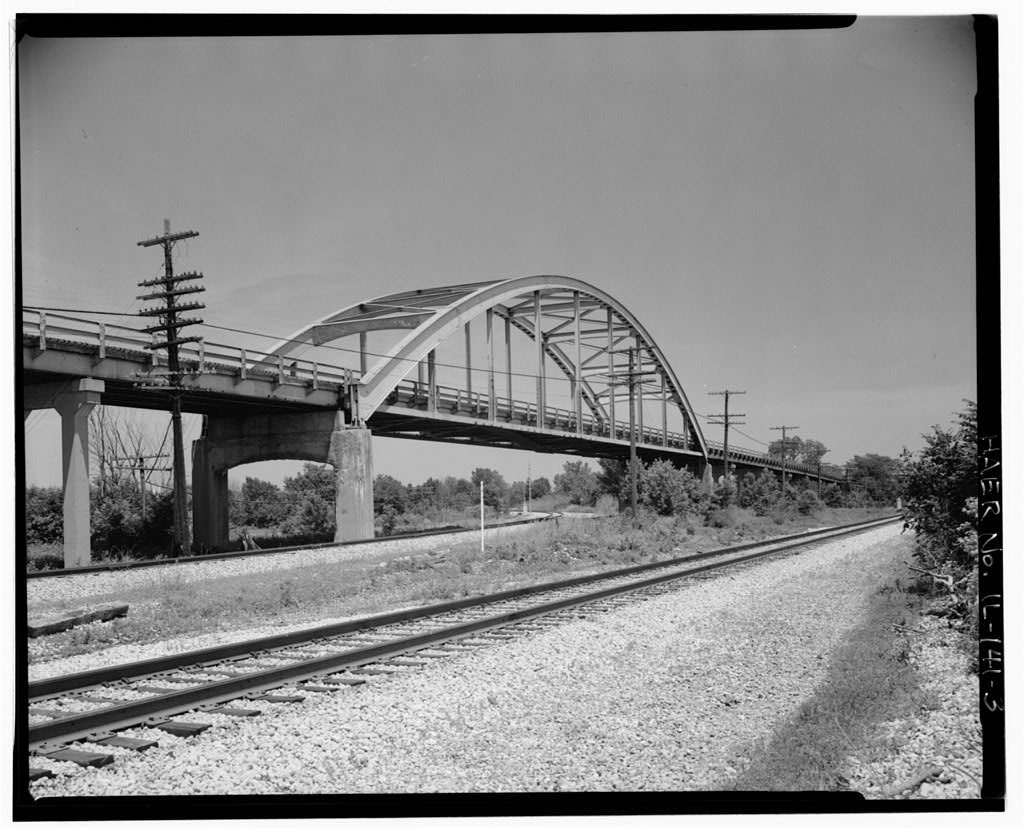
Lost Braceville US 66 bridge

For many years, Route 66 (and later Route 129) crossed a railroad line and a creek via a bowstring arch bridge south of Braceville. Route 53 on the south side of the railroad line did not cross anything, so there was only one bridge on the northern highway. The two state highways traveled parallel to each other for several miles. In 1994 however, the arch bridge was closed off, and was removed in 2000.

== Demographics ==
Historical population
Census	Pop.	Note	%±
1880	278		—
1890	2,150		673.4%
1900	1,669		−22.4%
1910	971		−41.8%
1920	303		−68.8%
1930	219		−27.7%
1940	321		46.6%
1950	384		19.6%
1960	558		45.3%
1970	668		19.7%
1980	721		7.9%
1990	587		−18.6%
2000	792		34.9%
2010	793		0.1%
2020	724		−8.7%
U.S. Decennial Census

=== 2020 census ===
Braceville village, Illinois – Racial and ethnic composition Note: the US Census treats Hispanic/Latino as an ethnic category. This table excludes Latinos from the racial categories and assigns them to a separate category. Hispanics/Latinos may be of any race.
Race / Ethnicity (NH = Non-Hispanic)	Pop 2000	Pop 2010	Pop 2020	% 2000	% 2010	% 2020
White alone (NH)	777	747	656	98.11%	94.20%	90.61%
Black or African American alone (NH)	0	3	1	0.00%	0.38%	0.14%
Native American or Alaska Native alone (NH)	1	2	0	0.13%	0.25%	0.00%
Asian alone (NH)	0	0	1	0.00%	0.00%	0.14%
Native Hawaiian or Pacific Islander alone (NH)	0	3	0	0.00%	0.38%	0.00%
Other race alone (NH)	0	0	1	0.00%	0.00%	0.14%
Mixed race or Multiracial (NH)	5	13	30	0.63%	1.64%	4.14%
Hispanic or Latino (any race)	9	25	35	1.14%	3.15%	4.83%
Total	792	793	724	100.00%	100.00%	100.00%

As of the 2020 census there were 724 people, 288 households, and 202 families residing in the village. The population density was 216.83 inhabitants per square mile (83.72/km^{2}). There were 308 housing units at an average density of 92.24 per square mile (35.61/km^{2}). The racial makeup of the village was 91.71% White, 0.14% African American, 0.14% Native American, 0.14% Asian, 0.00% Pacific Islander, 1.80% from other races, and 6.08% from two or more races. Hispanic or Latino of any race were 4.83% of the population.

There were 288 households, out of which 33.7% had children under the age of 18 living with them, 60.07% were married couples living together, 8.68% had a female householder with no husband present, and 29.86% were non-families. 23.26% of all households were made up of individuals, and 7.99% had someone living alone who was 65 years of age or older. The average household size was 3.77 and the average family size was 3.08.

The village's age distribution consisted of 37.2% under the age of 18, 4.5% from 18 to 24, 22.2% from 25 to 44, 22.6% from 45 to 64, and 13.3% who were 65 years of age or older. The median age was 34.7 years. For every 100 females, there were 164.5 males. For every 100 females age 18 and over, there were 138.6 males.

The median income for a household in the village was $76,667, and the median income for a family was $86,786. Males had a median income of $62,443 versus $27,898 for females. The per capita income for the village was $29,773. About 9.9% of families and 9.8% of the population were below the poverty line, including 9.4% of those under age 18 and 3.4% of those age 65 or over.

== Education ==
Portions in Grundy County are in the Braceville School District 75 and the Gardner-South Wilmington Township High School District.

Portions in Will County are in the Reed Custer Community Unit School District 255U.

== Notable person ==
- Al Braithwood, pitcher for the Pittsburgh Rebels
