= Drillers Stadium =

Former baseball stadium in Tulsa, Oklahoma, United States

Coordinates: 36°8′22.73″N 95°55′25.20″W

- Interactive map of Drillers Stadium
- Former names: Robert B. Sutton Stadium (1981–1982); Tulsa County Stadium (1982–1989)
- Location: 15th and Yale, Tulsa, Oklahoma
- Owner: Tulsa County
- Capacity: 10,997
- Surface: Grass
- Field size: LF: 335; CF: 390; RF: 340

Construction
- Opened: 1981
- Closed: 2010
- Demolished: 2019

Tenants
- Tulsa Drillers (TL) (1981–2009); The Bedlam Series baseball Tulsa Athletics (NPSL) (2013–2017)

Drillers Stadium was a minor league baseball stadium located in Tulsa, Oklahoma. From 1981 to 2009, Drillers Stadium was home to the Tulsa Drillers, of the Double-A Texas League. For a number of years Drillers Stadium also hosted one of the regular season baseball games played between Oklahoma State University and the University of Oklahoma in the Bedlam Series. Drillers Stadium is located on the southwest corner of Yale Avenue and 15th Street, in the Tulsa State Fairgrounds complex that also includes Expo Square Pavilion, the QuikTrip Center and Golden Driller, a racetrack, a waterpark, and the sites of the former Bell's Amusement Park and of Oiler Park, where Tulsa's professional baseball teams had played since 1934.

== Baseball ==
After the Tulsa Oilers, a Triple-A team, left Tulsa in 1976 due to the continuing deterioration of Oiler Park, followed by the partial collapse of the Oiler Park grandstand during a 1977 exhibition game, Tulsa County's long-delayed efforts to build a new stadium were accelerated. The new 8,000 seat stadium was completed in 1981 and named Robert B. Sutton Stadium, in honor of its chief benefactor, a local oil executive. However, Sutton was convicted in 1982 on obstruction of justice charges, and the ballpark was renamed Tulsa County Stadium. The stadium received the name Drillers Stadium in 1989. The stadium eventually seated 10,997, making it the largest stadium in Double-A baseball. Originally a multi-purpose stadium with an artificial surface playing field, it later acquired a Prescription Athletic Turf (PAT) grass surface. Though it primarily served as a baseball stadium, monster truck rallies and concerts were also held there.

On December 19, 2008, construction began on ONEOK Field, a new ballpark in downtown Tulsa. The Drillers played their final game in Drillers Stadium on September 7, 2009, and moved to the new ballpark before the 2010 baseball season. The University of Tulsa conducted a formal study in 2009 to consider whether the school might use the empty stadium to restore its baseball program, which had been terminated in 1980; but the university concluded that the financial demands of adding a new sport were more than it could accept. In 2011 the stadium was used as a location for a faith-themed baseball film entitled Home Run.

== Soccer ==
Beginning in May 2013, it is the home stadium for the Tulsa Athletics of the National Premier Soccer League. In 2014, the stadium was renamed Athletics Stadium after further renovations were complete to make the stadium more soccer friendly for the Tulsa Athletics. Notable changes include the demolition of the former first-base side bleachers, in order to lengthen the soccer field's length to 110 yards, as well as the removal of Drillers' signage and a coat of green paint.

== Planned demolition ==
On April 5, 2016, Proposition 3 of the Tulsa "Vision 2025" initiative was approved by Tulsa voters, paving the way for the demolition of Athletics Stadium as the new site of the USA BMX "Epicenter" facility. The stadium was to be replaced by a multimillion-dollar indoor BMX arena, but those plans hit a snag in mid-2017 when a disagreement over soft drink "pouring rights" derailed the negotiations and saw the BMX project move to an alternate location on a parcel of city-owned industrial property, northwest of downtown.

As of March 2019 the stadium and the adjacent offices have been demolished leaving nothing of the former stadium remaining.
