= Doc Gessler =

American baseball player (1880–1924)

- Right fielder
- Born: December 23, 1880; Indiana, Pennsylvania, U.S.
- Died: December 26, 1924 (aged 44); Indiana, Pennsylvania, U.S.
- Batted: Left Threw: Right

MLB debut
- April 22, 1903, for the Detroit Tigers

Last MLB appearance
- October 7, 1911, for the Washington Senators

MLB statistics
- Batting average: .280
- Home runs: 14
- Runs scored: 363
- Stats at Baseball Reference

Teams
- As player: Detroit Tigers (1903); Brooklyn Superbas (1903–1906); Chicago Cubs (1906); Boston Red Sox (1908–1909); Washington Senators (1909–1911); As manager: Pittsburgh Stogies (1914)

Henry Homer "Doc" Gessler (December 23, 1880 – December 26, 1924) was a Major League Baseball player born in Indiana, Pennsylvania, who began his eight-season career, at the age of 22, with the Detroit Tigers in 1903. He played mainly as a right fielder in a career that totaled 880 games played, 2969 at bats, 831 hits, 363 RBIs and 14 home runs. Doc died of tuberculosis in his home-town of Indiana at the age of 44, and is interred in Saint Bernard Cemetery in Indiana, Pennsylvania.

== College years ==
Before his baseball career, he attended Ohio University, Washington & Jefferson College, and became a physician, graduating from Johns Hopkins Medical School. He was one of three doctors in the 1906 World Series (with Doc White and Frank Owen).

== Career ==
After his short stay with Detroit, he then moved on to the Brooklyn Superbas in an unknown transaction. For Brooklyn, he became a good hitter, batting .290 in both of his full seasons with them. After a slow start in 1906, he was traded to the Chicago Cubs in exchange for Hub Knolls on April 28.

He did not play in the Majors for the 1907 season, but reappeared for the 1908 Boston Red Sox and batted .308, hit 14 triples, and led the American League in on-base percentage. The following season, manager Fred Lake announced that Doc would be team's Captain for the 1909 season. This situation did not last the season, as he was traded to the Washington Senators on September 9, 1909 in exchange for Charlie Smith. He played three seasons for the Senators and retired after the 1911 season.

In eight seasons, Gessler posted a .280 batting average with 370 runs, 127 doubles, 50 triples, 14 home runs, 142 stolen bases, 333 bases on balls, .370 on-base percentage and .370 slugging percentage. He finished his career with a .959 fielding percentage playing at right field and first base.

== Managerial stint ==
Doc became the manager of the Pittsburgh Stogies of the upstart Federal League in 1914, but after 11 games, and a 3 win 8 loss record, was replaced by Rebel Oakes. The team soon adopted the nickname Rebels after their new manager, who remained their manager through the 1914 season, and the entire 1915 season.
