= Tulsa Drillers =

- Founded in 1977; Tulsa, Oklahoma
Team logo
Cap insignia

Minor league affiliations
- Class: Double-A (1977–present)
- League: Texas League (1977–present)
- Division: North Division

Major league affiliations
- Team: Los Angeles Dodgers (2015–present)
- Previous teams: Colorado Rockies (2003–2014); Texas Rangers (1977–2002)

Minor league titles
- League titles (4): 1982; 1988; 1998; 2018
- Division titles (9): 1982; 1988; 1998; 1999; 2002; 2014; 2017; 2018; 2019
- First-half titles (10): 1977; 2002; 2004; 2005; 2006; 2012; 2013; 2014; 2022; 2026
- Second-half titles (10): 1981; 1982; 1988; 1992; 1998; 1999; 2013; 2017; 2018; 2019
- Wild card berths (2): 2007; 2025

Team data
- Name: Tulsa Drillers (1977–present); Lafayette Drillers (1975–1976)
- Ballpark: ONEOK Field (2010–present)
- Previous parks: Drillers Stadium (1981–2009); Oiler Park (1977–1980)
- Owner(s)/ Operator(s): Diamond Baseball Holdings (majority); Dale & Jeff Hubbard, Arlo DeKraai (minority)
- General manager: Mike Melega
- Manager: Eric Wedge
- Website: milb.com/tulsa

The Tulsa Drillers are a minor league baseball team based in Tulsa, Oklahoma. The team, which plays in the Texas League, is the Double-A affiliate of the Los Angeles Dodgers major-league club.

== Stadium ==
The Drillers play at ONEOK Field (pronounced "one-oak"), in downtown Tulsa's Greenwood district. The team previously played at Drillers Stadium on the Tulsa County Fairgrounds at 15th and Yale in midtown Tulsa. The Drillers held their first home opener at ONEOK Field on April 8, 2010, losing 7–0 to the Corpus Christi Hooks in front of an over-capacity crowd of 8,665. In their first season in the new ballpark, the Drillers drew total attendance of 408,183, the highest season figure in the history of Tulsa professional baseball.

== History ==
The Drillers came into being in 1977, when the two-year-old Lafayette Drillers were moved to Tulsa from Louisiana. Before that time, the Triple-A Tulsa Oilers had been the city's minor league club, but owner A. Ray Smith moved that team to New Orleans due to concerns over the dilapidated condition of Oiler Park. The new team opted to carry over the Drillers from Lafayette, given the longstanding importance of oil in Tulsa's economy. Apart from World War II, professional baseball has been played in Tulsa continuously since 1932.

The Drillers set up shop at Oiler Park, which was renamed Driller Park. However, it was obvious that the old stadium was at the end of its useful life, and plans were already underway for a replacement. Tulsa County completed 8,000 seat Robert B. Sutton Stadium in 1981, naming it for its chief benefactor, a local oil executive. Sutton, however, was convicted in 1982 of fraud, and as a result the County renamed the park Tulsa County Stadium, and renamed it Drillers Stadium in 1989.

From 1977 to 2002, the Drillers were the Double-A affiliate of the Texas Rangers. In 2002, Rangers owner Tom Hicks purchased the Shreveport, Louisiana Texas League franchise with the intention of moving the team to Frisco, Texas, a suburban city north of Dallas, Texas. At the time, the Shreveport Swamp Dragons were affiliated with the San Francisco Giants; Hicks cast aside this association and bought out the remaining two years of Tulsa's Player Development Contract. The Drillers then signed a two-year agreement with the Colorado Rockies. After the 2014 season they signed an affiliation agreement with the Los Angeles Dodgers.

Batting coach Mike Coolbaugh was killed in a freak accident on July 22, 2007. While standing in the first base coach box, he was hit in the head by a line drive. Although CPR was administered at the scene, he died less than an hour later. The Drillers and Travelers suspended their game, which the Travelers had been leading, 7–3, in the ninth inning. The Drillers also postponed their game the following night. The coroner concluded that Coolbaugh was actually hit in the neck with the line drive instead of the head, which ruptured an artery in his neck, killing him. As a result of this event, Major League Baseball began making helmets for base coaches mandatory in 2008.

In conjunction with Major League Baseball's restructuring of Minor League Baseball in 2021, the Drillers were organized into the Double-A Central. In 2022, the Double-A Central became known as the Texas League, the name historically used by the regional circuit prior to the 2021 reorganization.

On October 3, 2023, the club announced that it had sold majority ownership to Diamond Baseball Holdings.

== Championship seasons ==
The Drillers were Texas League champions four times: in 1982, 1988, 1998, and 2018. They won the Eastern Division championship in 1999 and 2002. The Drillers also appeared in the Texas League playoffs during the 2004, 2005, 2006, 2007, 2017, 2025, and 2026 seasons.

== Ownership ==
Tulsa businessman Bill Rollings acquired the Lafayette franchise and moved it to Tulsa in 1977. Country music entertainer Roy Clark was a co-owner of the team for six years. Went Hubbard bought the team in 1986. In March 2006, Chuck Lamson (a former Drillers pitcher and executive) bought out much of Hubbard's stock in the team; Lamson became president and majority owner of the team. In December 2010, Lamson sold his stock back to Hubbard. This transaction made Hubbard the sole owner of the team; his sons, Dale and Jeff, became co-chairmen. Went and Dale Hubbard are residents of Walpole, New Hampshire; Jeff Hubbard, a former player (in 1987) and coach (in 1991) for the Drillers, lives in Durham, North Carolina. Went Hubbard died in September 2012.

== Media ==
ESPN SportsCenter anchor John Anderson has often alluded to team alumni as "former Driller(s)" on-air. Anderson was a weekend sports anchor for Tulsa CBS affiliate KOTV before joining ESPN.

For 13 years the Tulsa Drillers' radio (and sometime television) announcer was Mark Neely, but in January 2009 it was announced that Neely had been hired to be the new TV play-by-play announcer for the San Diego Padres. In February the Drillers announced that Neely's replacement would be Dennis Higgins, former announcer for the Wichita Wranglers. Since the 2005 season, the Drillers have been broadcast on KTBZ (AM), Sports Radio 1430, "The Buzz" in Tulsa.

== Notable former players ==
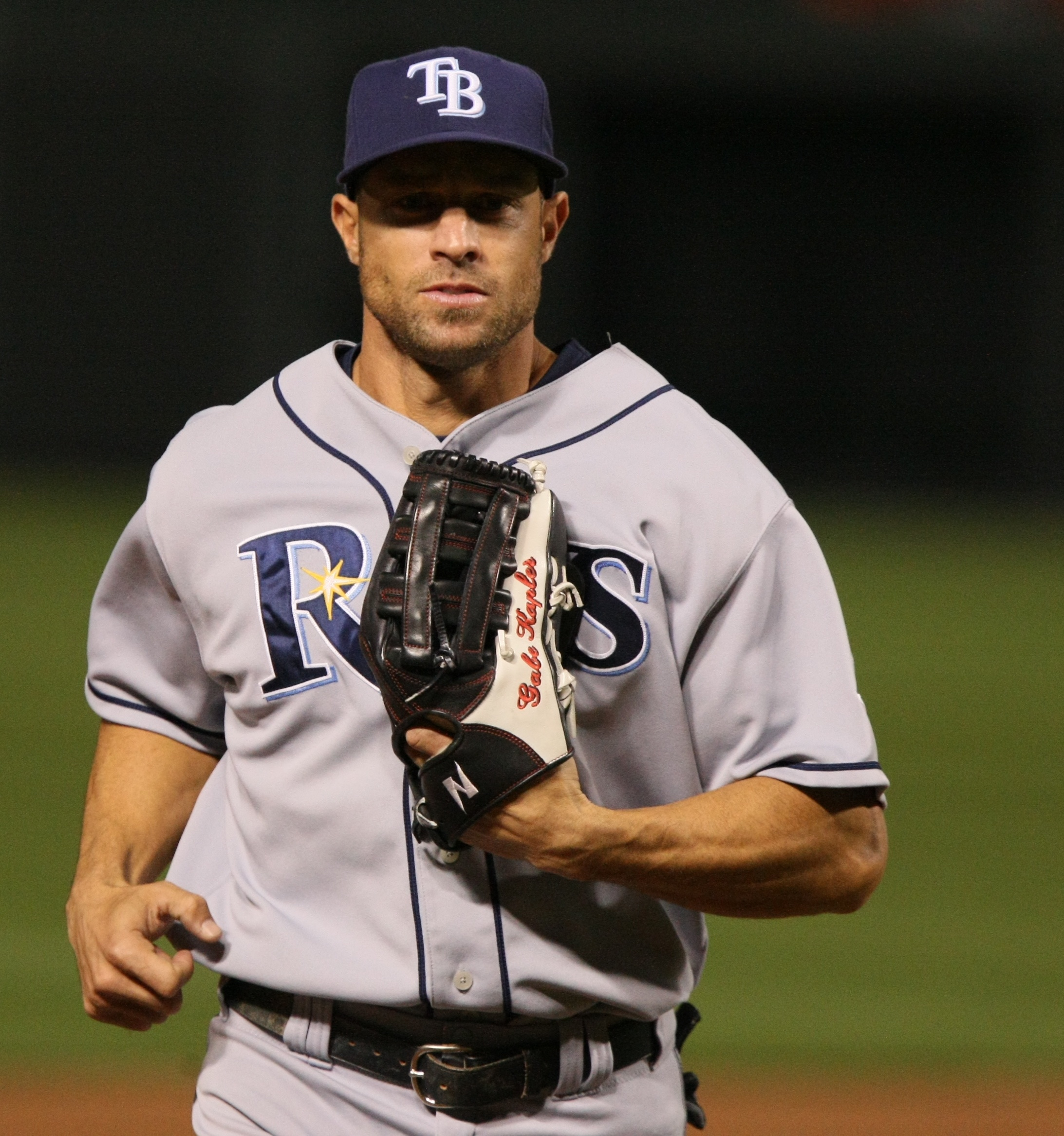
Gabe Kapler

- Ubaldo Jiménez, pitcher
- Troy Tulowitzki, shortstop
- Brad Hawpe, outfielder
- Jeff Francis, pitcher
- Ryan Speier, pitcher
- Matt Holliday, outfielder
- Dexter Fowler, outfielder
- Ian Stewart, third baseman
- Chris Iannetta, catcher
- Gabe Kapler, outfielder
- Iván Rodríguez, catcher
- Sammy Sosa, outfielder
- Fernando Tatis Sr., shortstop
- Carlos Pena, outfielder
- Charlie Blackmon, outfielder
- Nolan Arenado, third baseman
- Corey Seager, shortstop
- Cody Bellinger, first baseman, outfielder
- Walker Buehler, pitcher

== Roster ==
Tulsa Drillers roster
Players	Coaches/Other
Pitchers: 41 Myles Caba; 24 Patrick Copen; 7 Wyatt Crowell ~; 2 Cam Day; 47 Aidan Foeller; 15 Luke Fox; 7 Roque Gutierrez; 45 Peter Heubeck; 32 Carson Hobbs; 12 Jacob Kmatz; 39 Payton Martin; 99 Kevin Ramirez; 23 Zach Root; 40 Christian Ruebeck; 27 Adam Serwinowski; 17 Evan Shaw; 16 Christian Suarez; 18 Lucas Wepf; 26 Christian Zazueta; Catchers: 43 Griffin Lockwood-Powell; -- Nelson Quiroz ~; 28 Frank Rodriguez; Infielders: 6 Jake Gelof; 14 Elijah Hainline; 43 Jose Izarra; 4 Sean McLain; 45 Sam Mongelli; 30 Joe Vetrano; 11 Logan Wagner; 10 Taylor Young; Outfielders: 25 Charles Davalan; 1 Kendall George; 5 Kole Myers; 23 Kyle Nevin; 55 Eduardo Quintero; 47 Mike Sirota	Manager: 22 Eric Wedge; Coaches: 20 Jose Capellan (bullpen catcher); -- Tyler DeJong (development); -- Blake Gailen (hitting); 31 Johan Garcia (bench); 34 Durin O'Linger (pitching); -- Jake Taylor (performance); 40 Ramón Troncoso (pitching); 55 Juan Zabala (bullpen catcher); 60-day injured list: 53 Yeiner Fernandez; -- Jared Karros; 7-day injured list; * On Los Angeles Dodgers 40-man roster; ~ Development list; # Rehab assignment; ∞ Reserve list; ‡ Restricted list; § Suspended list; † Temporarily inactive list; Roster updated September 16, 2026; Transactions; → More rosters: MiLB • Texas League; → Los Angeles Dodgers minor league players

== See also ==
- Category:Tulsa Drillers players
