= Oiler Park =

Stadium in Tulsa, Oklahoma, U.S.

Coordinates: 36°8′23″N 95°55′37″W

- Former names: Texas League Park (1934–1961); Driller Park (1977–1980)
- Location: Tulsa, Oklahoma
- Capacity: 4,000 (original) 7,200 (maximum)
- Surface: Natural grass

Construction
- Opened: July 11, 1934
- Closed: 1980
- Demolished: 1980

Tenants
- Tulsa Oilers (1934–1976); Tulsa Drillers (TL) (1977–1980)

Oiler Park was a stadium located in Tulsa, Oklahoma. Located on the Tulsa County Fairgrounds, it was primarily used for baseball and was the home of the Tulsa Oilers until that team was moved to New Orleans and replaced by the Tulsa Drillers after the 1976 season. The ballpark had a capacity of 4,000 people when opened in 1934, and increased to 7,200 in 1948.

It opened in 1934 as Texas League Park. It was not well maintained for much of its history; its dilapidated condition was obvious as early as the 1950s. The Oilers nearly moved to Albuquerque in 1961 in part due to the stadium's poor state of repair before A. Ray Smith bought the team and heavily renovated the stadium to ensure the Oilers would stay in Tulsa. Along with the renovations came a new name, Oiler Park.

The grandstand's poor condition was even mentioned comically in Jim Bouton's landmark baseball memoir Ball Four.

After the Oilers, long a mainstay of the AA Texas League, won promotion to Triple-A, Smith poured significant resources into keeping Oiler Park at something approaching Triple-A standards. However, when he could not get support from public or private sources for further repairs, he moved the Oilers to New Orleans as the Pelicans after the 1976 season. The Texas League's Lafayette Drillers moved from Lafayette, Louisiana to take the Oilers' place, and renamed it Driller Park.

However, it was now apparent that the old stadium was at the end of its useful life. In 1977, part of the grandstand collapsed during a major league exhibition game. The stadium was replaced by nearby Drillers Stadium in 1980, and demolished.
