= Wild pitch =

Baseball statistic

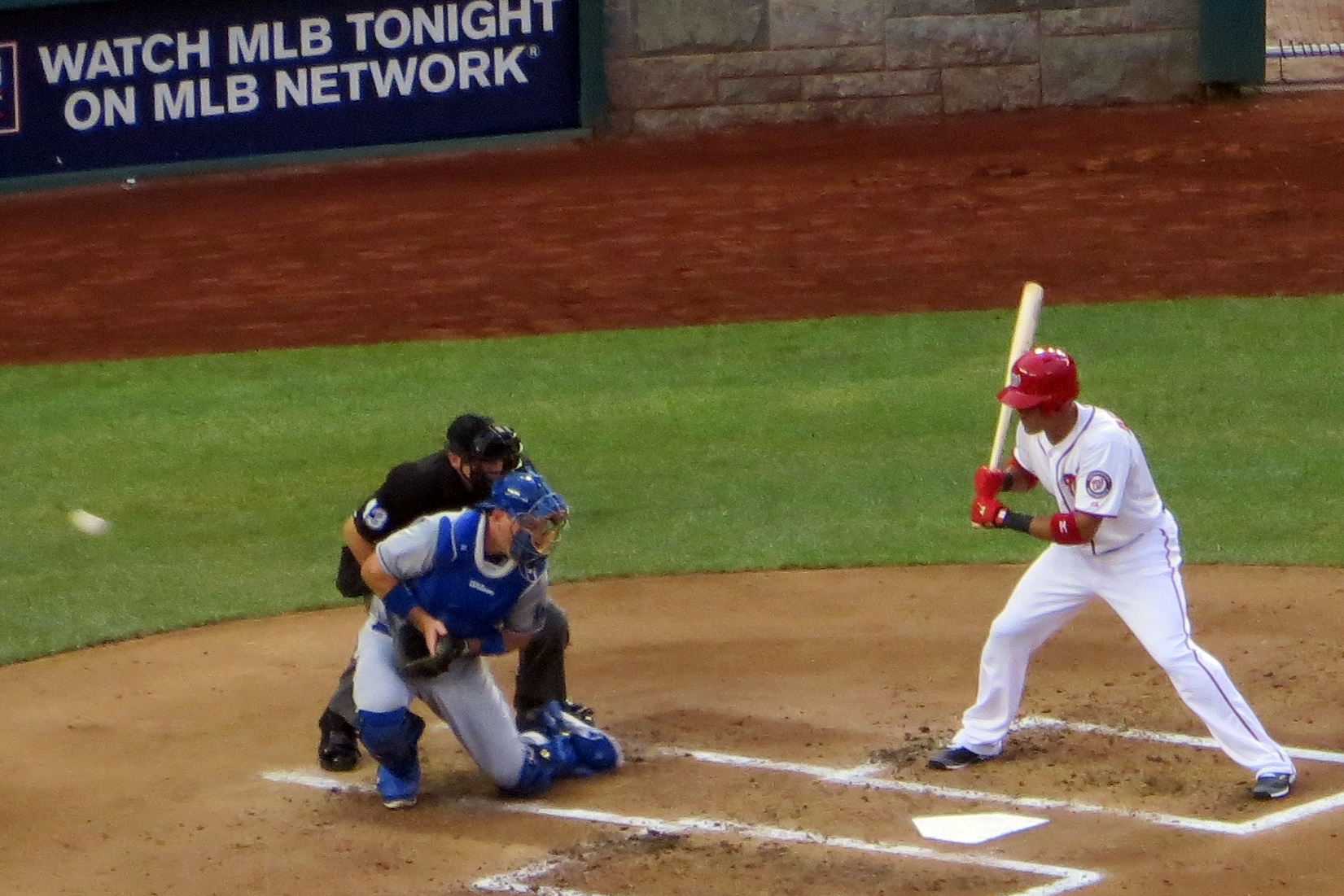
A wild pitch goes past the catcher.

In baseball, a wild pitch (WP) is charged against a pitcher when his pitch is too high, too short, or too wide of home plate for the catcher to control with ordinary effort, thereby allowing a baserunner, or the batter (on an uncaught third strike), to advance.

A wild pitch usually passes the catcher behind home plate, often allowing runners on base an easy chance to advance while the catcher chases the ball down. Sometimes the catcher may block a pitch, and the ball may be nearby, but the catcher has trouble finding the ball, allowing runners to advance.

A closely related statistic is the passed ball. As with many baseball statistics, whether a pitch that gets away from a catcher is counted as a wild pitch or a passed ball is at the discretion of the official scorer. The benefit of the doubt is usually given to the catcher if there is uncertainty; therefore, most of these situations are scored as wild pitches. If the pitch was so low as to touch the ground, or so high that the catcher has to jump to get to it, or so wide that the catcher has to lunge for it, it is usually ruled a wild pitch and not a passed ball. Because the pitcher and catcher handle the ball much more than other fielders, certain misplays on pitched balls are defined in Rule 10.13 as wild pitches and passed balls. No error shall be charged when a wild pitch or passed ball is scored.

A wild pitch may only be scored if one or more runners advance. If the bases are empty, or if the catcher retrieves the ball quickly and no runner is able to advance, a wild pitch is not charged. A run scored on a wild pitch is recorded as an earned run. A runner who advances on a wild pitch is not credited with a stolen base unless he breaks before the pitcher begins his delivery.

== Records ==
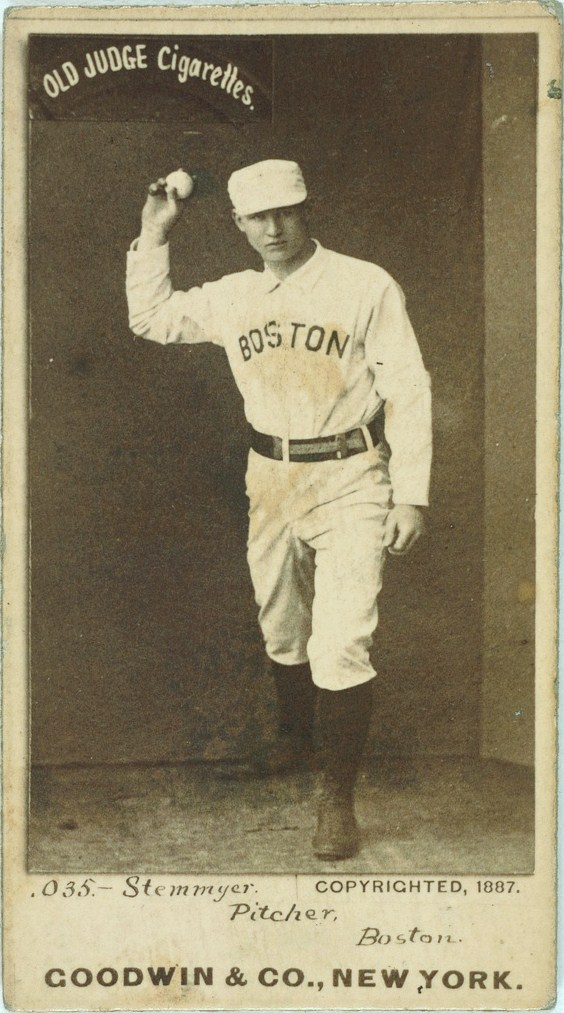
Bill Stemmyer threw a National League record 63 wild pitches in one season.

Nolan Ryan is the modern-era leader in the wild pitches, throwing 277 over his 27 years in Major League Baseball (MLB). He also led his league in the category in six different seasons. However, the all-time record belongs to Tony Mullane, who threw 343 in the early years of the game from 1881 to 1894. After Ryan's 277, the next pitcher on the list is Mickey Welch with 274, followed by Bobby Matthews, who threw 253.

The single-season record for wild pitches is held by Mark Baldwin, who threw 83 in 1889 while pitching in the American Association. Second place on the season list is held jointly by Tony Mullane and Bill Stemmyer, who threw 63 wild pitches in 1884 and 1886, respectively. Since 1900, the highest total in a season has been 30, by Red Ames in 1905.

The modern-era MLB record for wild pitches in a single game is six, shared by three pitchers: Bill Gullickson, Phil Niekro, and J. R. Richard. The modern-era MLB record for wild pitches in a single inning during the regular season is four, shared by six pitchers: Walter Johnson, Kevin Gregg, R. A. Dickey, Phil Niekro, Ryan Madson, and Brooks Kriske. Bert Cunningham of the Players' League (considered a major league) threw five wild pitches in an inning in 1890. On June 26, 2017, Adam Ottavino allowed five runs on four wild pitches, the most runs allowed on wild pitches in a single game in at least 50 years.

On June 3, 2023, the Chicago White Sox and Detroit Tigers scored three runs in a 2–1 game on wild pitches, marking the first modern instance where all runs were scored on wild pitches in a game where three or more runs were scored.

As of July 2026, the active career leader for wild pitches thrown in MLB is Sonny Gray with 106, followed by Justin Verlander with 100.

== Postseason ==
Rick Ankiel of the St. Louis Cardinals threw five wild pitches in the third inning of the first game of the 2000 National League Division Series against the Atlanta Braves.

Only one World Series has ended on a wild pitch—the 1927 edition. An errant delivery by Pittsburgh Pirates reliever Johnny Miljus in the ninth inning of Game 4 allowed Earle Combs of the New York Yankees to score the winning run.

In the bottom of the 10th inning of Game 6 of the 1986 World Series, with the Boston Red Sox leading 5–4, the New York Mets had runners on first and third with two outs. Boston relief pitcher Bob Stanley threw a wild pitch which allowed Kevin Mitchell to score the tying run from third and Ray Knight to move from first to second base. With Knight in scoring position, he was able to score the winning run on first baseman Bill Buckner's now infamous error.
