= A. Ray Smith =

American baseball executive

Albert Ray Smith (May 1, 1915 – June 28, 1999, in Tulsa, Oklahoma, United States) was a long-time baseball executive, best known for his ownership of the minor-league Tulsa Oilers franchise, which he later moved to Louisville, Kentucky, where the team set minor league attendance records.

== Biography ==
Born in Dugger, Indiana, he played football at, and received a business administration degree from, Indiana University. With Clint Murchison, he co-founded Tecon Industries, a construction company predecessor of Standard Industries. He supervised the company's role in major construction projects around the world, including the St. Lawrence Seaway and the widening of the Panama Canal. During World War II, he was a colonel in the 8th Air Force Corps of Engineers. He moved to Tulsa in 1958, and bought out Murchison's interest in Standard Industries in 1961. In February of that same year, he got wind that Tulsa Oilers owner Grayle Howlett was about to move the team to Albuquerque. Smith persuaded Howlett to sell him a stake in the team for $25,000. A few months later, in July 1961, he bought out Howlett's interest and became sole owner.

The Oilers moved from the AA Texas League to the AAA Pacific Coast League in 1966. He contributed to the revival of the American Association in 1969 and moved the Oilers to that league. From 1963 to 1966, he also owned one-tenth of the Cleveland Indians, a Major League Baseball team.

During Smith's ownership, the Oilers won five league titles (two Texas League, one PCL, two AA), but struggled with the deteriorating condition of their aging stadium, Oiler Park. The stadium had been an albatross around the Oilers' necks since it had been built in 1934; it had not been well maintained over the years. Indeed, the Oilers had nearly moved to Albuquerque due to the park's poor state of repair. Smith poured significant resources into Oiler Park to keep it at something approaching AAA standards, but by the 1970s it was apparent that the facility was nearing the end of its useful life. Unable to secure public support in Tulsa to replace or rebuild the ballpark, Smith ultimately moved the Oilers to New Orleans, Louisiana, in 1977, renaming the team the New Orleans Pelicans, and then to Springfield, Illinois, in 1978 as the Springfield Redbirds.

After the 1981 season, he again moved the team, to Louisville, Kentucky, where they became the Louisville Redbirds (later the Louisville RiverBats and now the Louisville Bats). The team was a great success in Louisville, setting minor league attendance records. Smith was named Executive of the Year by The Sporting News in 1983.

In 1985, he bid on the Cincinnati Reds, however he was outbid by Marge Schott.

After the 1986 season, Smith sold the Redbirds. He then attempted to bring baseball to St. Petersburg, Florida, but was unable to bring that goal to fruition.

He also served on the board of the Anaheim Angels for seven years.

== Honors ==
- Minor League Executive of the Year, 1982 & 1983

== Family ==
His daughter, Emily Smith Miller-Mundy (1943–2013), was a prominent figure in the Tulsa Sound music scene, and the inspiration for Leon Russell's song "Sweet Emily".
