= Ralph Comstock =

American baseball player (1887–1966)

- Pitcher
- Born: November 24, 1887; Riga, Michigan, U.S.
- Died: September 13, 1966 (aged 78); Toledo, Ohio, U.S.
- Batted: Right Threw: Right

MLB debut
- August 26, 1913, for the Detroit Tigers

Last MLB appearance
- September 1, 1918, for the Pittsburgh Pirates

MLB statistics
- Win–loss record: 11–14
- Earned run average: 3.72
- Strikeouts: 100
- Stats at Baseball Reference

Teams
- Detroit Tigers (1913); Boston Red Sox (1915); Pittsburgh Rebels (1915); Pittsburgh Pirates (1918)

Ralph Remick Comstock (November 24, 1887 – September 13, 1966) was an American pitcher in Major League Baseball who played between 1913 and 1918 for the Detroit Tigers (1913), Boston Red Sox (1915), Pittsburgh Rebels (FL, 1915) and Pittsburgh Pirates (1918). Comstock batted and threw right-handed. He was born in Sylvania, Ohio, USA.

In a three-season career, Comstock posted an 11–14 record with 100 strikeouts and a 3.72 ERA in 40 games, including 22 starts, 10 complete games, four saves, and 203 innings pitched.

Comstock died in Toledo, Ohio, at the age of 78.

== Sources ==
- Career statistics from Baseball Reference · Baseball Reference (Minors) · Retrosheet · Baseball Almanac
- Retrosheet
