= Jim Kelly (baseball) =

American baseball player (1884–1961)

- Right fielder
- Born: February 1, 1884; Bloomfield, New Jersey, U.S.
- Died: April 10, 1961 (aged 77); Kingsport, Tennessee, U.S.
- Batted: Left Threw: Right

MLB debut
- April 24, 1914, for the Pittsburgh Pirates

Last MLB appearance
- July 4, 1918, for the Boston Braves

MLB statistics
- Batting average: .297
- Home runs: 4
- Runs batted in: 57
- Stats at Baseball Reference

Teams
- Pittsburgh Pirates (1914); Pittsburgh Rebels (1915); Boston Braves (1918)

James Robert Kelly (February 1, 1884 – April 10, 1961) was an American Major League Baseball player. He played three seasons with the Pittsburgh Pirates (1914), Pittsburgh Rebels (1915), and the Boston Braves (1918).
