= Al Braithwood =

American baseball player (1892-1960)

- Pitcher
- Born: February 15, 1892; Braceville, Illinois, U.S.
- Died: November 24, 1960 (aged 68); Rowlesburg, West Virginia, U.S.
- Batted: Right Threw: Left

MLB debut
- September 1, 1915, for the Pittsburgh Rebels

Last MLB appearance
- October 2, 1915, for the Pittsburgh Rebels

MLB statistics
- Win–loss record: 0–0
- Earned run average: 0.00
- Strikeouts: 2
- Stats at Baseball Reference

Teams
- Pittsburgh Rebels (1915)

Alfred Braithwood (February 15, 1892 – November 24, 1960) was an American professional baseball pitcher. Braithwood, a left-hander, made two relief appearances for the Pittsburgh Rebels of the Federal League in 1915.
