= Johnny Miljus =

American baseball player (1895–1976)

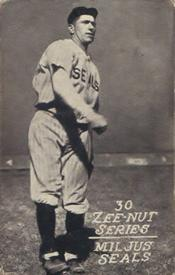
- Pitcher
- Born: June 30, 1895; Pittsburgh, Pennsylvania, U.S.
- Died: February 11, 1976 (aged 80); Fort Harrison, Montana, U.S.
- Batted: Right Threw: Right

MLB debut
- October 2, 1915, for the Pittsburgh Rebels

Last MLB appearance
- September 25, 1929, for the Cleveland Indians

MLB statistics
- Win–loss record: 67-26
- Earned run average: 3.92
- Strikeouts: 166
- Stats at Baseball Reference

Teams
- Pittsburgh Rebels (1915); Brooklyn Robins (1917, 1920–1921); Pittsburgh Pirates (1927–1928); Cleveland Indians (1928–1929)

Career highlights and awards
- 1927 National League Pennant

John Kenneth (Johnny) Miljus (Serbian Cyrillic Џон Кенет Миљуш or Serbian Latin Džon Kenet Miljuš) (June 30, 1895 – February 11, 1976), nicknamed "Big Serb" and "Jovo", was a Serbian-American baseball player who pitched in Major League Baseball between 1915 and 1929. Miljus was most likely the first Serbian-American to play in professional baseball.

== Early life ==
Miljus was born in the Lawrenceville section of Pittsburgh. He attended Duquesne University and the University of Pittsburgh. While in school, he worked in the steel mills and played college football and baseball. He also played on local semi-pro teams, which occasionally faced Negro league teams like the Homestead Grays. He graduated as a doctor of dentistry but never practiced.

Miljus served in the United States Army during World War I, in France, as part of the 320th Infantry. His wartime bunkmate was Joe Harris. The two of them would later be reunited as members of the Pittsburgh Pirates. Miljus was wounded in action at the Battle of the Argonne and was to be sent home. Instead, he chose to rejoin his unit and return to action after leaving the hospital.

== Career ==
After toiling in the minors, this lanky 6 ft 1 in (1.85 m) 178-pounder spent six seasons in the major leagues as a pitcher. Miljus reached the majors in 1915 with the Pittsburgh Rebels of the outlaw Federal League, spending one year with them before moving to the Brooklyn Robins (NL, 1920–21), Pittsburgh Pirates (NL, 1927–28) and Cleveland Indians (AL, 1928–29). More than a dependable pitcher, he filled several roles coming out from the bullpen as a closer or a middle reliever, and as an occasional starter as well.

Miljus is probably best remembered as the pitcher who served up a ninth-inning wild pitch that escaped Pirates' catcher Johnny Gooch and allowed the New York Yankees to sweep the 1927 World Series. In Game 4, after striking out Lou Gehrig and Bob Meusel, and with two strikes on Tony Lazzeri, the next Miljus pitch rolled far enough away for Earle Combs to score the winning run.

In a seven-season career, Miljus posted a 29–26 record with 166 strikeouts and a 3.92 ERA in 457 1/3 innings pitched, including 45 starts, 15 complete games, two shutouts, and five saves.

== See also ==
- Pete Suder
- Nick Strincevich
- Walt Dropo
- Doc Medich
- Dave Rajsich
- Doc Medich
