= Ed Holly =

American baseball player (1879–1973)

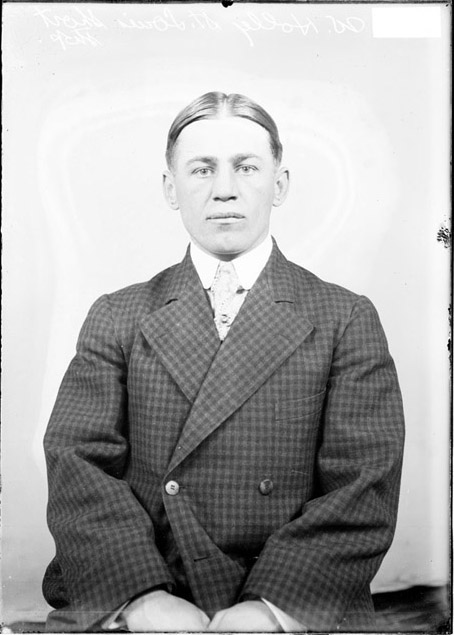
- Holly in 1907
- Shortstop
- Born: July 6, 1879; Chicago, Illinois, U.S.
- Died: November 27, 1973 (aged 94); Williamsport, Pennsylvania, U.S.
- Batted: Right Threw: Right

MLB debut
- July 18, 1906, for the St. Louis Cardinals

Last MLB appearance
- June 6, 1915, for the Pittsburgh Rebels

MLB statistics
- Batting average: .231
- Home runs: 1
- Runs batted in: 78
- Stats at Baseball Reference

Teams
- St. Louis Cardinals (1906–07); Pittsburgh Rebels (1914–15)

Edward William Holly (July 6, 1879 – November 27, 1973), born Edward William Ruthlavy, was an American Major League Baseball shortstop. He played all or part of four seasons in the majors. He is also a member of the International League Hall of Fame.

Holly's professional career began in 1899 with the Western League's Milwaukee Brewers. In 1901, he played for the St. Paul Saints. After eight years in the minor leagues, Holly was acquired from the Johnstown Johnnies, where he had batted .298 in 1906 by the St. Louis Cardinals. He played 10 games for the Cards, batting just .059, but was apparently impressive enough to be handed the starting shortstop job in 1907, replacing Forrest Crawford. Holly played 150 games for St. Louis that year, batting .229. He was let go after the season.

In 1908, Holly was back in the minor leagues, playing for the Rochester Bronchos of the Eastern League, the predecessor of the International League. He spent the next six seasons in that league, with the Bronchos, Montreal Royals, and Toronto Maple Leafs, where he built his reputation as a top defensive shortstop. Three of his teams won the league championship during his tenure: Rochester in 1909 and 1910, and Montreal in 1912.

It would take a third major league to bring Holly back to the majors in 1914. That year, Holly joined the Pittsburgh Rebels of the upstart Federal League. He served as their starting shortstop that year, batting .246 in 100 games. The next season, however, he was on the bench behind Marty Berghammer, who had jumped over from the Cincinnati Reds. After the season, the Federal League folded, and Holly retired as an active player.

Holly returned to the International League in 1928 as manager of the Montreal Royals. He managed the club for three full seasons and parts of two others—including winning 96 games in 1930—before being let go partway through the 1932 season. He was also a long-time scout for several different major league teams. He was elected to the IL Hall of Fame in 1949.
