= Al Vincent =

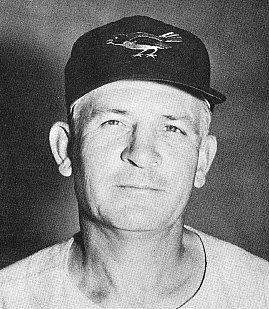
- Vincent as an Orioles coach (1955)
- Coach
- Born: December 23, 1906; Birmingham, Alabama, U.S.
- Died: December 14, 2000 (aged 93); Beaumont, Texas, U.S.
- Batted: Right Threw: Right
- Stats at Baseball Reference

Teams
- Detroit Tigers (1943–1944); Baltimore Orioles (1955–1959); Philadelphia Phillies (1961–1963); Kansas City Athletics (1966–1967)

Albert Linder Vincent (December 23, 1906 – December 14, 2000) was an American professional baseball player, manager, coach and scout. A second baseman, his playing and managing careers were confined to minor league baseball, but he spent 12 seasons in Major League Baseball as a coach for four clubs.

Vincent was also a prominent figure as a college baseball coach. He was assistant baseball coach at Lamar University from 1974 to 1989 and was inducted into Lamar's "Cardinals Hall of Honor" in 1981. Lamar University's Vincent-Beck Stadium is named after him.

His brother was American composer, conductor and music educator John Vincent.

== Major League coaching career ==
- Detroit Tigers (1943–1944)
- Baltimore Orioles (1955–1959)
- Philadelphia Phillies (1961–1963)
- Kansas City Athletics (1966–1967)

== Minor league managing career ==
- Beaumont Exporters (1937–1940; 1953) – won league championship in 1938
- Buffalo Bisons (1941–1942)
- Dallas Rebels (1946–1947) – won league championship in 1946
- Tulsa Oilers (1948–1951) – won league championship in 1949
- Birmingham Barons (1952)
- Fort Worth Cats (1954)
- Miami Marlins (1960)
