= Jim Scott (shortstop) =

American baseball player (1887-1962)

- Shortstop
- Born: September 3, 1887; Cincinnati, Ohio, U.S.
- Died: December 2, 1962 (aged 75); Phoenix, Arizona, U.S.
- Batted: Right Threw: Right

MLB debut
- April 22, 1914, for the Pittsburgh Rebels

Last MLB appearance
- May 1, 1914, for the Pittsburgh Rebels

MLB statistics
- Batting average: .250
- Home runs: 0
- Runs batted in: 1
- Stats at Baseball Reference

Teams
- Pittsburgh Rebels (1914)

John William Scott (September 3, 1887 – December 2, 1962), also known as Jim Scott, was an American professional baseball shortstop who played from 1909 through 1915, including part of the 1914 season with the Pittsburgh Rebels of the Federal League (considered a major league). Listed at 5 feet 9.5 inches (1.765 m) and 165 pounds (75 kg), he threw and batted right-handed.
