= Medric Boucher =

American baseball and soccer player (1886-1974)

- Catcher
- Born: March 12, 1886; St. Louis, Missouri, US
- Died: March 12, 1974 (aged 88); Martinez, California, US
- Batted: Right Threw: Right

MLB debut
- May 20, 1914

Last MLB appearance
- September 10, 1914

MLB statistics
- At bats: 17
- Hits: 5
- Runs batted in: 2
- Stats at Baseball Reference

Teams
- Baltimore Terrapins (1914); Pittsburgh Rebels (1914)

Medric Charles Francis Boucher (March 12, 1886 – March 12, 1974) was an American Major League Baseball player in 1914. He played for the Baltimore Terrapins and Pittsburgh Rebels of the Federal League.

Boucher also played soccer in St. Louis during the winter break. In 1910, he was a right full back with St. Leo's of the St. Louis Soccer League.
