= Bruce Connatser =

American baseball player (1902–1971)

- First baseman
- Born: September 19, 1902; Sevierville, Tennessee, U.S.
- Died: January 27, 1971 (aged 68); Terre Haute, Indiana, U.S.
- Batted: Right Threw: Right

MLB debut
- September 15, 1931, for the Cleveland Indians

Last MLB appearance
- September 25, 1932, for the Cleveland Indians

MLB statistics
- Batting average: .257
- Home runs: 0
- Runs batted in: 8
- Stats at Baseball Reference

Teams
- Cleveland Indians (1931–1932)

Broadus Milburn "Bruce" Connatser (September 19, 1902 – January 27, 1971) was an American Major League Baseball first baseman who played in 35 MLB games over two seasons for the Cleveland Indians (1931–1932). A right-handed batting and throwing first baseman who stood 5 feet 11 inches (1.80 m) tall and weighed 170 pounds (77 kg), he collected 28 hits, including six doubles and one triple.

The native of Sevierville, Tennessee, attended the University of Alabama.
