= Clint Rogge =

American baseball player (1889–1969)

- Pitcher
- Born: July 19, 1889; Memphis, Michigan, U.S.
- Died: January 6, 1969 (aged 79); Mount Clemens, Michigan, U.S.
- Batted: Left Threw: Right

MLB debut
- April 11, 1915, for the Pittsburgh Rebels

Last MLB appearance
- June 6, 1921, for the Cincinnati Reds

MLB statistics
- Win–loss record: 18–13
- Earned run average: 2.73
- Strikeouts: 105
- Stats at Baseball Reference

Teams
- Pittsburgh Rebels (1915); Cincinnati Reds (1921)

Francis Clinton Rogge (July 19, 1889 – January 6, 1969) was an American professional baseball pitcher. Rogge played for the Pittsburgh Rebels of the Federal League in 1915 and the Cincinnati Reds of the National League in 1921.
