= Willie Adams (1910s pitcher) =

American baseball player

- Pitcher
- Born: September 27, 1890; Clearfield, Pennsylvania, US
- Died: June 18, 1937 (aged 46); Albany, New York, US
- Batted: Right Threw: Right

MLB debut
- June 30, 1912, for the St. Louis Browns

Last MLB appearance
- September 6, 1919, for the Philadelphia Athletics

MLB statistics
- Win–loss record: 8–16
- Earned run average: 4.37
- Strikeouts: 74
- Stats at Baseball Reference

Teams
- St. Louis Browns (1912–1913); Pittsburgh Rebels (1914); Philadelphia Athletics (1918–1919)

James Irvin Adams (September 27, 1890 – June 18, 1937) was an American pitcher for the St. Louis Browns, Pittsburgh Rebels, and Philadelphia Athletics. He attended Albright College prior to his playing career.

He led the American League in earned runs allowed (83) and hit batters (12) in 1918.

In 5 years he had an 8–16 win–loss record, 65 games, 21 games started, 8 complete games, 30 games finished, 2 saves, 284 1/3 innings pitched, 303 hits allowed, 172 runs allowed, 138 earned runs allowed, 8 home runs allowed, 144 walks allowed, 74 strikeouts, 19 hit batsmen, 8 wild pitches, 1,238 batters faced and a 4.37 ERA.

While an active player in the minor leagues in 1922, Adams suffered a heart attack, which ended his baseball career.

He died in Albany, New York, at the age of 46.
