= Skipper Roberts (baseball) =

American baseball player (1888–1963)

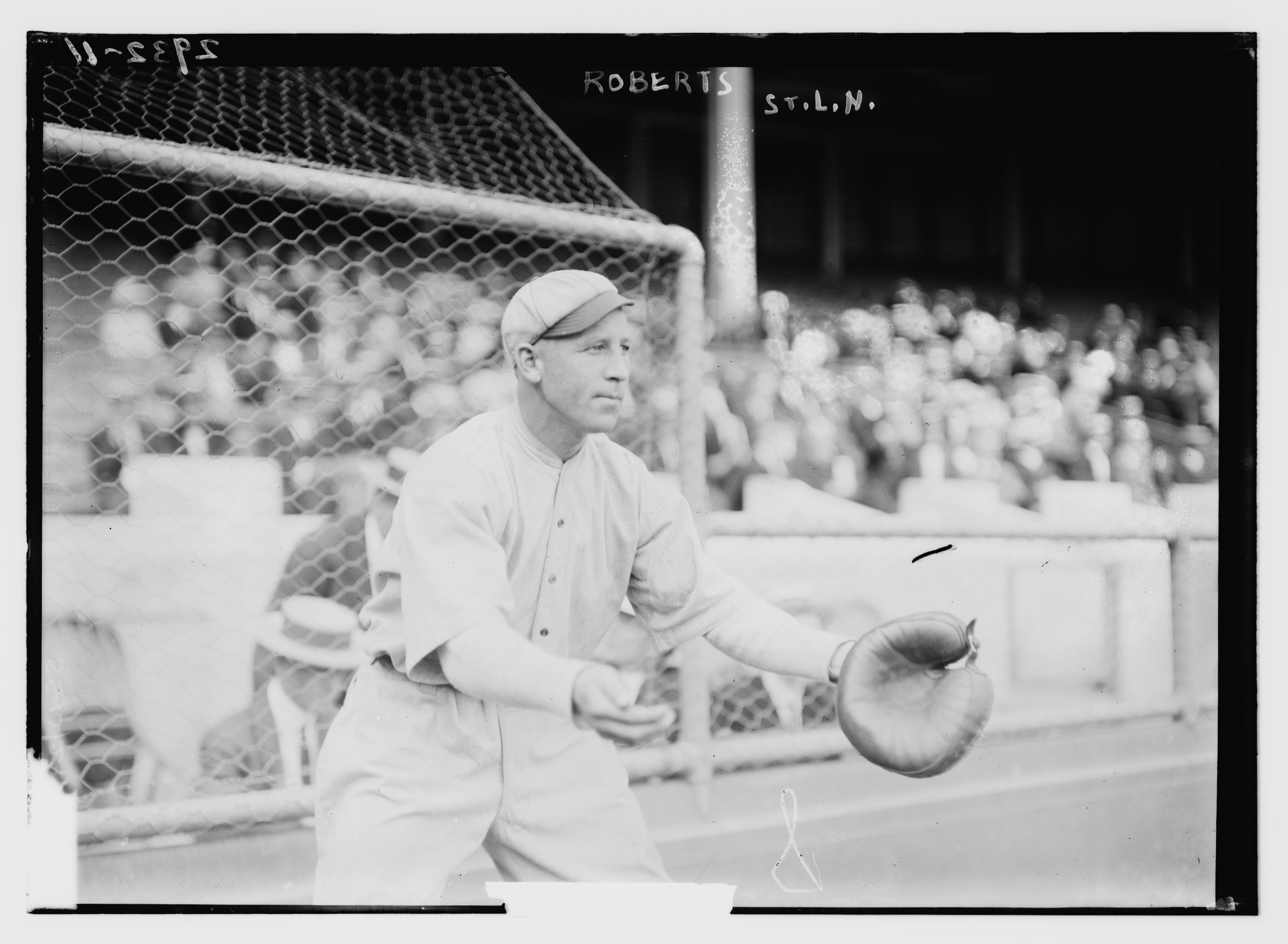
- Catcher
- Born: January 11, 1888; Wardner, Idaho, U.S.
- Died: December 24, 1963 (aged 75); Long Beach, California, U.S.
- Batted: Left Threw: Right

MLB debut
- June 12, 1913, for the St. Louis Cardinals

Last MLB appearance
- August 12, 1914, for the Pittsburgh Rebels

MLB statistics
- Games played: 82
- At bats: 138
- Hits: 29
- Stats at Baseball Reference

Teams
- St. Louis Cardinals (1913); Pittsburgh Rebels (1914); Chicago Chi-Feds (1914); Pittsburgh Rebels (1915)

Clarence Ashley "Skipper" Roberts (January 11, 1888 – December 24, 1963) was a catcher in Major League Baseball.
