= Bob Coulson =

American baseball player (1887–1953)

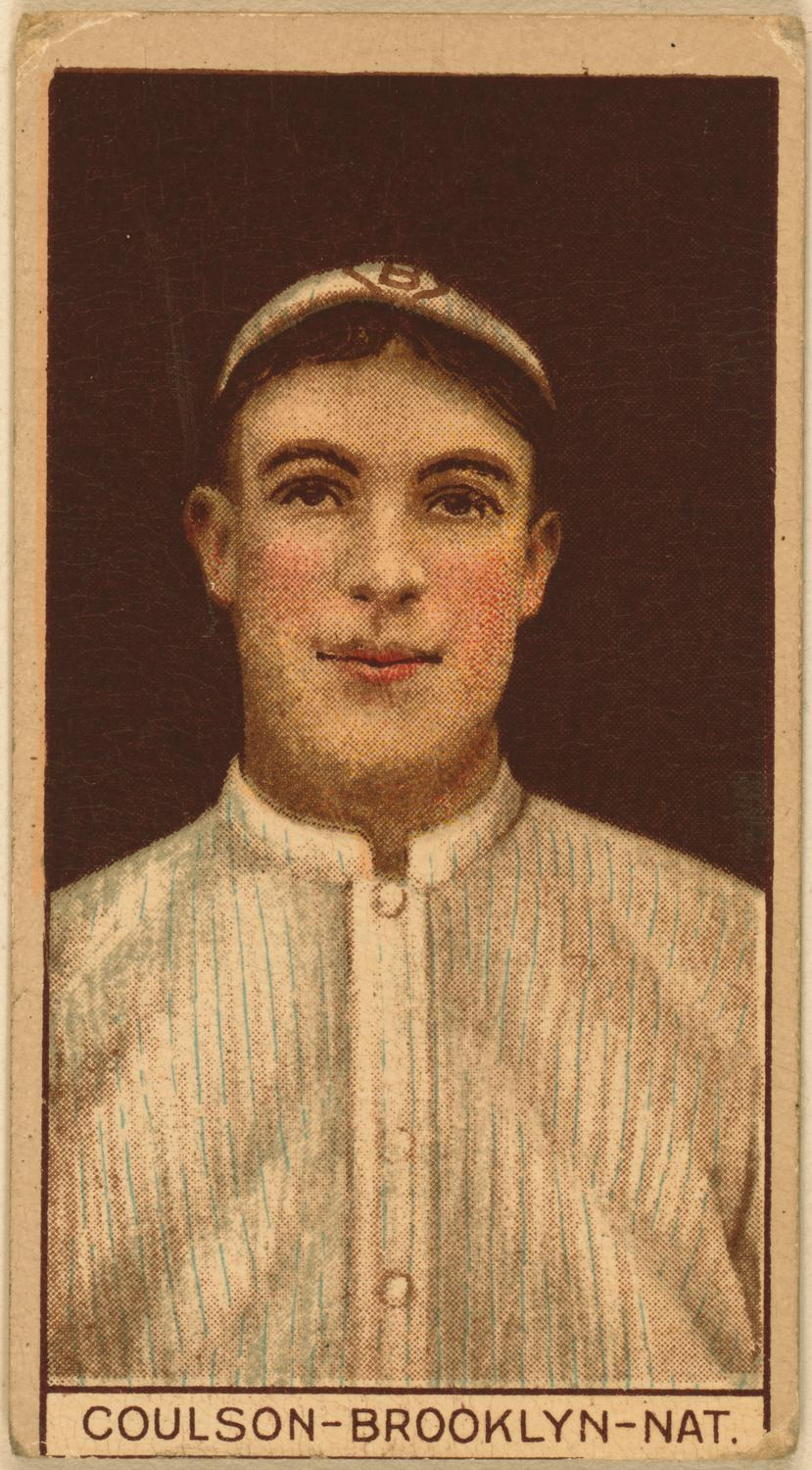
- Bob Coulson baseball card from 1912
- Outfielder
- Born: June 17, 1887; Courtney, Pennsylvania, U.S.
- Died: September 11, 1953 (aged 66); Washington, Pennsylvania, U.S.
- Batted: Right Threw: Right

MLB debut
- August 4, 1908, for the Cincinnati Reds

Last MLB appearance
- July 3, 1914, for the Pittsburgh Rebels

MLB statistics
- Batting average: .236
- Home runs: 1
- RBI: 67
- Stats at Baseball Reference

Teams
- Cincinnati Reds (1908); Brooklyn Superbas/Dodgers (1910–1911); Pittsburgh Rebels (1914)

Robert Jackson Coulson (June 17, 1887 – September 11, 1953) was an American Major League Baseball and Federal League outfielder. He played ball in four seasons, which spanned 7 years. In the Majors, he played for the Cincinnati Reds and Brooklyn Superbas. In his one season in the Federal League, 1914, he played for the Pittsburgh Rebels. Coulson threw and batted right-handed, weighed 175 pounds, and was 5 ft 10 in (1.78 m) tall. He also attended Penn State University.

On August 4, 1908, at the age of 21, Coulson made his Major League debut with the Reds. In 18 at-bats in his rookie year, he batted .333 (which would end up being the highest batting average in his career). In 1911, Coulson had a career year. Although he hit only .234 and led the league in strikeouts with 78, he stole 32 bases and collected 7 triples. He also had career highs in every major category except home runs. In 1914, 3 years after his last game in the Majors, Coulson played 18 games for the Federal League's Rebels. He had a batting average of .203.

Overall, Coulson had one career home run (in 1910), 43 stolen bases, and a .236 career batting average. Statistically, according to Baseball Reference, he is most similar to Karl Olson. Fielding, Coulson had a .961 career fielding percentage.

Coulson played his final game on July 3, 1914. He died in Washington, Pennsylvania, on September 11, 1953, and was laid to rest in Beallsville Cemetery in Beallsville, Pennsylvania.
