= Ed Henderson =

American baseball player (1884-1964)

- Pitcher
- Born: December 25, 1884; Newark, New Jersey
- Died: January 15, 1964 (aged 79); New York City
- Batted: Left Threw: Left

MLB debut
- May 15, 1914, for the Pittsburgh Rebels

Last MLB appearance
- July 2, 1914, for the Indianapolis Hoosiers

MLB statistics
- Win–loss record: 1–1
- Earned run average: 4.15
- Strikeouts: 5
- Stats at Baseball Reference

Teams
- Pittsburgh Rebels (1914); Indianapolis Hoosiers (1914)

Edward J. Henderson (December 25, 1884 – January 15, 1964), born Eugene Johnson Ball, was a professional baseball pitcher. Henderson played for the Pittsburgh Rebels and the Indianapolis Hoosiers of the Federal League in 1914. He spent 1913 with the Lowell Grays of the New England League, and jumped to the Federal League the following year as the Lowell club was unable to pay him.
