= Frank Madden (baseball) =

American baseball player (1892-1952)

- Catcher
- Born: October 17, 1892; Pittsburgh, Pennsylvania, U.S.
- Died: April 30, 1952 (aged 59); Pittsburgh, Pennsylvania, U.S.
- Batted: Unknown Threw: Unknown

MLB debut
- July 4, 1914, for the Pittsburgh Rebels

Last MLB appearance
- August 5, 1914, for the Pittsburgh Rebels

MLB statistics
- Games played: 2
- Batting average: .500 (1-for-2)
- Runs batted in: 1
- Stats at Baseball Reference

Teams
- Pittsburgh Rebels (1914)

Frank A. Madden (October 17, 1892 – April 30, 1952) (Note: Listed birth date is per his draft registration cards, which list his full name as "Frank A. Madden". Baseball references sites disagree as to if Madden was born in 1891 or 1892.) was an American professional baseball catcher.

== Biography ==
Nicknamed "Red", Madden played in two games for the major-league Pittsburgh Rebels of the Federal League in 1914; on July 4 against the Baltimore Terrapins and on August 5 against the St. Louis Terriers. In the July 4 game, Madden entered a tied game in the top of the 10th inning as catcher; in the bottom of the inning, he came to bat with one out and a runner on second, and hit a game-winning single to right field. In the August 5 game, Madden appeared as a pinch hitter in the bottom of the ninth inning with two outs, the bases loaded, and his team down by a run—he was called out of strikes, (Note: A Pittsburgh newspaper reporter opined that the third strike was actually "a ball that was both high and wide.") ending the game. In total, Madden's brief major-league career consisted of one hit in two at bats, with one run batted in. Baseball records of the era, which are incomplete, indicate that Madden also played in the Ohio State League during 1912, appearing in 111 games for two different teams.

Little is known of Madden outside of his short baseball career. As of June 1917, per his draft registration card, he was working as a pipefitter. As of April 1942, per a later draft registration card, he was a cemetery worker. Madden died in his hometown of Pittsburgh in 1952; he was survived by his wife, Alice Miller.
