= Jimmie Savage (baseball) =

American baseball player (1883-1940)

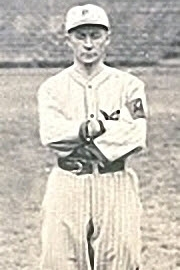
- Outfielder
- Born: August 29, 1883; Southington, Connecticut, US
- Died: June 26, 1940 (aged 56); New Castle, Pennsylvania, US
- Batted: Switch Threw: Right

MLB debut
- September 3, 1912, for the Philadelphia Phillies

Last MLB appearance
- October 3, 1915, for the Pittsburgh Rebels

MLB statistics
- Batting average: .276
- Home runs: 1
- Runs batted in: 26
- Stats at Baseball Reference

Teams
- Philadelphia Phillies (1912); Pittsburgh Rebels (1914–15)

James Harold Savage (August 29, 1883 – June 26, 1940) was an American Major League Baseball (MLB) outfielder. He played all or part of three seasons in the majors, between 1912 and 1915. He played two games in 1912 for the Philadelphia Phillies, then spent 1914 playing regularly for the Pittsburgh Rebels in the Federal League. He played mostly in right field, where he played 66 games, but also played substantially in left field and at shortstop and third base. He played another 14 games for the Rebels in 1915 to finish his major league career.

== Sources ==
- Career statistics from MLB · Baseball Reference · Baseball Reference (Minors) · Retrosheet · Baseball Almanac
