= Paddy O'Connor =

Irish baseball player (1879–1950)

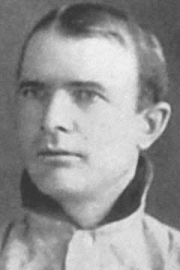
- Catcher
- Born: August 4, 1879; County Kerry, Ireland
- Died: August 17, 1950 (aged 71); Springfield, Massachusetts, U.S.
- Batted: Right Threw: Right

MLB debut
- April 17, 1908, for the Pittsburgh Pirates

Last MLB appearance
- July 22, 1918, for the New York Yankees

MLB statistics
- Batting average: .225
- Home runs: 0
- Runs batted in: 21
- Stats at Baseball Reference

Teams
- Pittsburgh Pirates (1908–1910); St. Louis Cardinals (1914); Pittsburgh Rebels (1915); New York Yankees (1918)

Patrick Francis O'Connor (August 4, 1879 – August 17, 1950) was an Irish born Major League Baseball player who played catcher from 1908 to 1918. He played for the Pittsburgh Pirates, St. Louis Cardinals, New York Yankees, and Pittsburgh Rebels.

A native of County Kerry, Ireland, O'Connor's family moved to the United States of America in 1886, where they located to Windsor Locks, Connecticut. After managing the Hartford Senators in 1928, O'Connor retired from baseball and made a living in private business. O'Connor died at Mercy Hospital in Springfield, Massachusetts on August 17, 1950. His funeral was held at St. Michael's Cemetery in Springfield on August 19.
