= George LeClair =

American baseball player (1886-1918)

- Pitcher
- Born: October 18, 1886; Milton, Vermont, US
- Died: October 10, 1918 (aged 31); Farnham, Quebec, Canada
- Batted: Right Threw: Right

MLB debut
- June 5, 1914, for the Pittsburgh Rebels

Last MLB appearance
- October 2, 1915, for the Baltimore Terrapins

MLB statistics
- Win–loss record: 7–12
- Earned run average: 3.36
- Strikeouts: 91
- Stats at Baseball Reference

Teams
- Pittsburgh Rebels (1914–1915); Buffalo Blues (1915); Baltimore Terrapins (1915)

George Lewis "Frenchy" LeClair (October 18, 1886 – October 10, 1918) was an American Major League Baseball pitcher who played for the Pittsburgh Rebels and Baltimore Terrapins in the Federal League in 1914 and 1915. He died at age 31, a victim of the 1918 flu pandemic. George was born in Milton, Vermont.
