= Ed Lennox =

American baseball player (1883–1939)

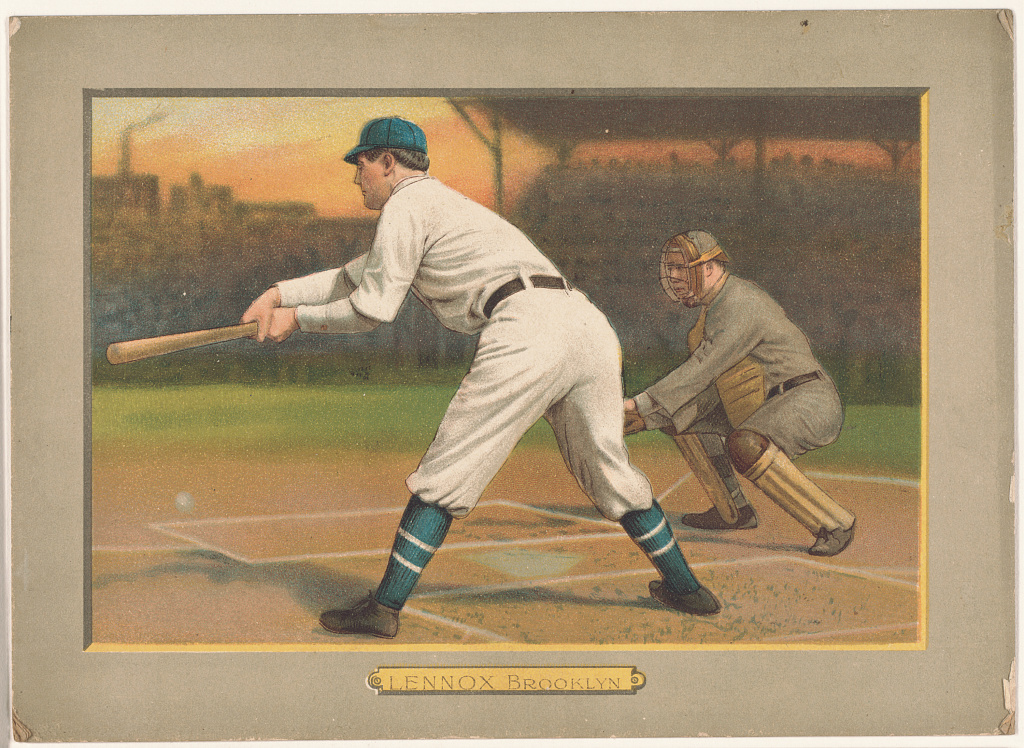
- Third baseman
- Born: November 3, 1883; Camden, New Jersey, U.S.
- Died: October 26, 1939 (aged 55); Camden, New Jersey, U.S.
- Batted: Right Threw: Right

MLB debut
- August 8, 1906, for the Philadelphia Athletics

Last MLB appearance
- October 3, 1915, for the Pittsburgh Rebels

MLB statistics
- Batting average: .274
- Home runs: 18
- Runs batted in: 185
- Stats at Baseball Reference

Teams
- Philadelphia Athletics (1906); Brooklyn Superbas (1909–1910); Chicago Cubs (1912); Pittsburgh Rebels (1914–1915)

James Edgar Lennox (November 3, 1883 – October 26, 1939) was an American professional baseball third baseman. He played in Major League Baseball (MLB) for the Philadelphia Athletics, Brooklyn Superbas, Chicago Cubs, and Pittsburgh Rebels.

While playing for the Rebels in 1914, Lennox hit for the cycle on May 6, becoming the only Federal League player to do so. He also hit pinch-hit home runs in consecutive games on June 10 and 11, a feat that was not accomplished again until Victor Martinez of the Detroit Tigers did so against the Miami Marlins on April 4 and 5, 2016.

== See also ==
- List of Major League Baseball players to hit for the cycle

Achievements
Preceded by Honus Wagner	Hitting for the cycle May 6, 1914	Succeeded by Heinie Groh
