= Elmer Knetzer =

American baseball player (1885–1975)

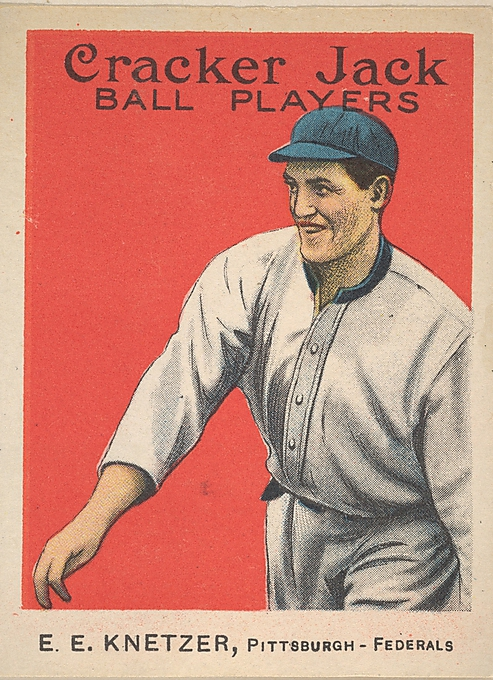
- Pitcher
- Born: July 22, 1885; Carrick, Pennsylvania
- Died: October 3, 1975 (aged 90)
- Batted: Right Threw: Right

MLB debut
- September 11, 1909, for the Brooklyn Superbas

Last MLB appearance
- June 18, 1917, for the Cincinnati Reds

MLB statistics
- Win–loss record: 69-69
- Earned run average: 3.15
- Strikeouts: 535
- Stats at Baseball Reference

Teams
- Brooklyn Superbas/Dodgers (1909–1912); Pittsburgh Rebels (1914–1915); Boston Braves (1916); Cincinnati Reds (1916–1917)

Elmer Ellsworth Knetzer (July 22, 1885 – October 3, 1975) was a professional baseball player who played pitcher in the Major Leagues from 1909 to 1917. He played for the Brooklyn Dodgers, Pittsburgh Rebels, Boston Braves, and Cincinnati Reds.

Knetzer pitched in the minor leagues through 1933, when he was 47 years old. He pitched in 19 games for the Springfield Chicks at age 47 and compiled a 7-7 record in 1933, his final season as a player and 16 years removed from his last major league appearance.
