= Ed Konetchy =

American baseball player (1885–1947)

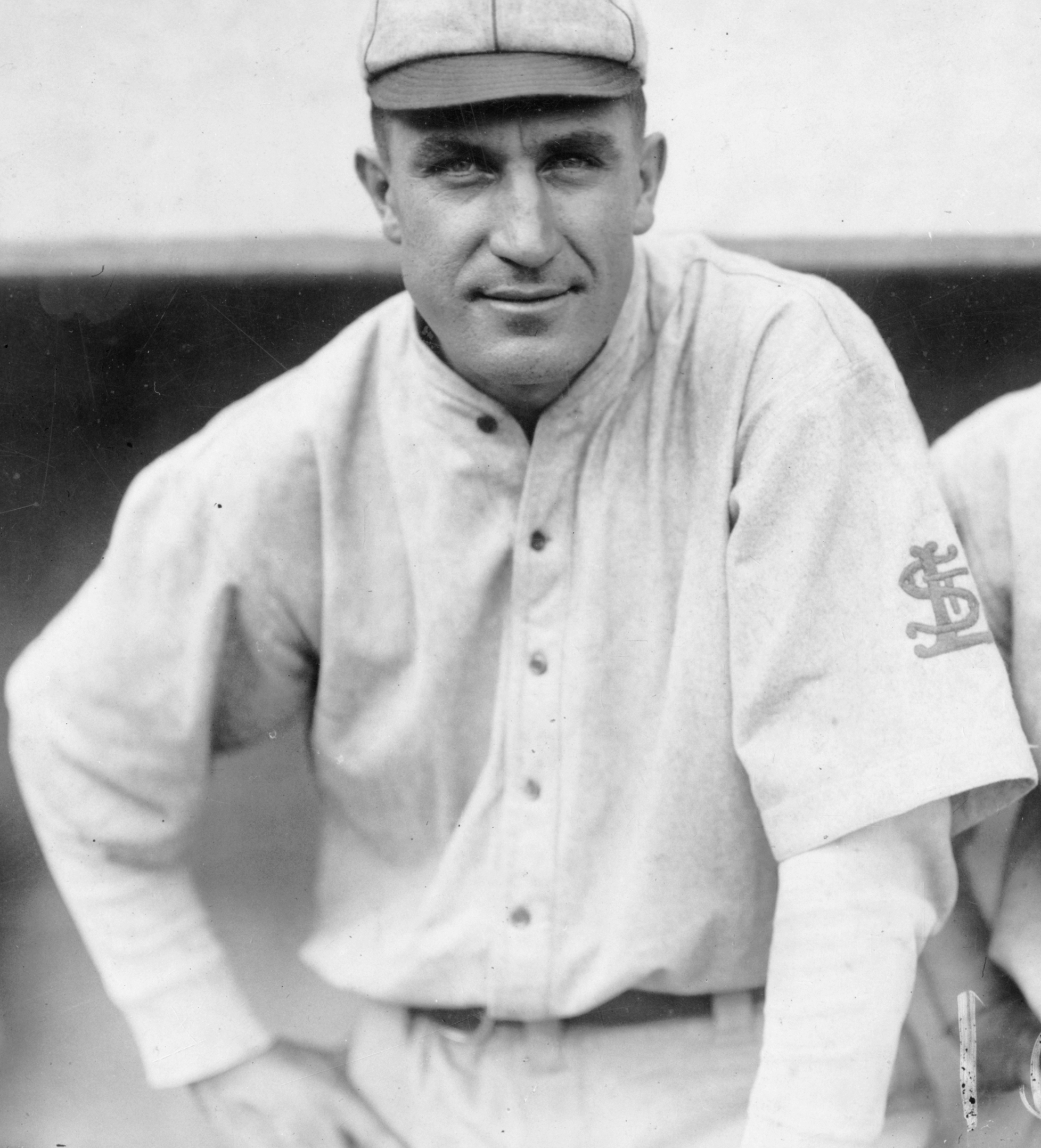
- First baseman
- Born: September 3, 1885; La Crosse, Wisconsin, U.S.
- Died: May 27, 1947 (aged 61); Fort Worth, Texas, U.S.
- Batted: Right Threw: Right

MLB debut
- June 29, 1907, for the St. Louis Cardinals

Last MLB appearance
- October 1, 1921, for the Philadelphia Phillies

MLB statistics
- Batting average: .281
- Hits: 2,150
- Home runs: 74
- Runs batted in: 992
- Stats at Baseball Reference

Teams
- St. Louis Cardinals (1907–1913); Pittsburgh Pirates (1914); Pittsburgh Rebels (1915); Boston Braves (1916–1918); Brooklyn Robins (1919–1921); Philadelphia Phillies (1921)

Edward Joseph Konetchy (September 3, 1885 – May 27, 1947), nicknamed "Big Ed" and "the Candy Kid", was an American first baseman in Major League Baseball for a number of teams, primarily in the National League, from 1907 to 1921. He played for the St. Louis Cardinals (1907–1913), Pittsburgh Pirates (1914), Pittsburgh Rebels of the Federal League (1915), Boston Braves (1916–1918), Brooklyn Robins (1919–1921), and Philadelphia Phillies (1921). He batted and threw right-handed.

== Baseball career ==
Ed Konetchy was born on September 3, 1885, in La Crosse, Wisconsin, the son of immigrant parents from Austria and Poland. In his youth, he would play ball in the sandlots of La Crosse. For at least some time he attended Lincoln Middle School, and worked in a candy factory where he joined the factory's baseball team. At 19 he joined the La Crosse Pinks of the Class-D Wisconsin State League, playing with the team at a park in what is now the 23rd and 24th Street Historic Neighborhood, at the current site of Heeter's Car Care. While he was considered an above-average hitter (he batted over .300 four times) he was more known around the league for his supreme consistency, his never-faltering speed, and his high degree of defensive skill at first base.

Konetchy made his Major League debut with the St. Louis Cardinals in 1907, and went on to acquire 25 stolen bases in 1909, hit .302 in 1910, and pick up 88 RBIs in 1911. He also had a 20-game hitting streak in 1910. In 1911, with the Cards only three games out of first place in early July, the team was involved in a train crash on its way from Philadelphia to Boston. 47 passengers were injured, while twelve died. None of the Cardinals were seriously injured, due to a pre-trip change in the location of their car to the rear of the train. Konetchy and Cards manager Roger Bresnahan led the rescue effort, carrying many passengers to safety, some of whom may have died. Despite posting their first winning season since 1901, the Cardinals never recovered from the incident, finishing a distant fifth; but Konetchy led the NL with 38 doubles, and his own team with six home runs and 88 RBIs. He led the Cardinals in hits in 1909, 1910, 1911, and 1912. When Konetchy moved to the Pirates in 1914, he had a below-average season, followed by an above-average one in the same city, but on a different team in a different league. Playing for Pittsburgh of the Federal League, he tied his career high with a .314 average, with 10 home runs and 93 RBIs.

Soon, he was back in the National League, and he was picking up hits in droves. In 1920 with Brooklyn, Konetchy got his only shot at postseason play during his career, although Brooklyn (93-61) lost the World Series in seven games to the 98–56 Cleveland Indians. In the Series, Konetchy picked up four hits in 23 at bats, a .174 average. However, he did have 2 RBIs in the Series, and three walks.

By the end of 1920, he had surpassed 2000 career hits and was quite high on the all-time leaderboard (into the top 25). His final season was spent in Brooklyn and then Philadelphia, when the Phillies selected him off waivers on July 4, 1921.

Konetchy's major league career ended there. Besides playing first base, he had tried out pitching, having thrown in 3 games. One of them, at Chicago in 1918, was a fairly bad start in which he pitched a complete game and allowed 8 runs (6 earned). This is believed to be the last instance of a non-pitcher pitching even the first two innings of a game: Alvin Dark and César Tovar pitched a first inning, once each. His two relief appearances were more successful: in one, he went 4 2/3 innings and gave up no runs on one hit to get the win.

In 2085 games, he batted a solid .281 with 74 home runs and 992 RBIs. He had 2150 career hits in 7649 at bats. Konetchy also picked up 255 career stolen bases. He ended with a total of 344 doubles, and after having reached doubles figures in triples ten times, retired with 182, tying him for the 11th highest total in history. He finished his career with a .990 fielding percentage.

After leaving the majors, he played with Fort Worth of the Texas League from 1922 through 1927, batting .345 with 41 home runs in 1925. After retiring, he went into business with pitching star Joe Pate.

He died in Fort Worth, Texas, at the age of 61. The cause was heart disease. He was posthumously inducted into the Wisconsin Athletic Hall of Fame in 1961. His interment was located at Fort Worth's cemetery Greenwood Memorial Park.

== Highlights ==
- Stole home twice on September 30, 1907, against Boston
- Broke up four no-hitters over the course of his career
- Hit two inside-the-park home runs against Brooklyn on August 5, 1912
- Picked up hits in 10 consecutive at bats in 1919, tying a record which would later be broken
- Led the league in total bases in 1915 (278)
- Made the Top 10 in the league in batting average six times (1909, 1910, 1912, 1915, 1919, 1920)
- Recorded the third-most career putouts in MLB history
- Has the most career triples of any player not in the Hall of Fame

== Quotes ==
- "I know I tried to play baseball as soon as I was big enough to raise a bat from the ground." – Konetchy
- "Hard work. I made it my business to study closely the pitchers who bothered me most, particularly Nap Rucker's high fastball." – Konetchy, when asked how he improved his batting
- "I suppose every player had the ambition to be a pitcher, and it may be that I might have had some chance to succeed if I had ever tried." – Konetchy
- "I'm the most traded man in baseball without getting anywhere." – Konetchy on swirling trade rumors while in St. Louis
- "The Federal League is the best league I have ever been connected with." – Konetchy
- "Ed Koney's still a kid first baseman, just getting limbered up. You tell 'em." – Konetchy on being the oldest player in the NL
- “One of the fellows stepped forward, shook my hand and greeted me cordially. Then he began speaking in what I later found out was Greek. I stopped him and told him that I was very sorry, but that I happened to be Bohemian. He looked puzzled, then disappointed, glanced at me, then the big floral piece, which was fully as tall as I am, and said, ‘You take it, kid, and the best of luck to you.’” – Konetchy on being approached by a group of Greek fans at a Cardinals/Pirates game, Pittsburgh, 1907

== See also ==
- List of Major League Baseball career hits leaders
- List of Major League Baseball individual streaks
- List of Major League Baseball career triples leaders
- List of Major League Baseball career stolen bases leaders
- List of Major League Baseball annual doubles leaders
- List of St. Louis Cardinals team records
