= Jack Lewis (baseball) =

American baseball player (1884–1956)

- Second baseman
- Born: February 14, 1884; Pittsburgh, Pennsylvania
- Died: February 25, 1956 (aged 72); Steubenville, Ohio
- Batted: Right Threw: Right

MLB debut
- September 16, 1911, for the Boston Red Sox

Last MLB appearance
- October 3, 1915, for the Pittsburgh Rebels

MLB statistics
- Batting average: .247
- Home runs: 1
- Runs batted in: 80
- Stats at Baseball Reference

Teams
- Boston Red Sox (1911); Pittsburgh Rebels (1914–15)

John David Lewis (February 14, 1884 – February 25, 1956) was a second baseman in Major League Baseball, who played in the American League with the Boston Red Sox (1911) and for the Pittsburgh Rebels of the "outlaw" Federal League (1914–15). Listed at 5 ft 8 in (1.73 m), 158 lb., Lewis batted and threw right-handed.

== Biography ==
Born in Pittsburgh, Pennsylvania, on February 14, 1884, Lewis was a .247 hitter (169-for-684) during his three-season career, with one home run and eighty RBI in 217 games, including sixty-three runs, twenty doubles, ten triples and eighteen stolen bases. In two hundred fielding appearances, he played at second base (172 times), shortstop (twelve times), right field (six times), first base (five times) and third base (one time). He committed fifty-one errors in 1,068 chances for a collective .952 fielding percentage.

== Death ==
Lewis died in Steubenville, Ohio, on February 25, 1956, at the age of seventy-two.

== See also ==
- 1911 Boston Red Sox season
