= Hugh Bradley (baseball) =

American baseball player (1885–1949)

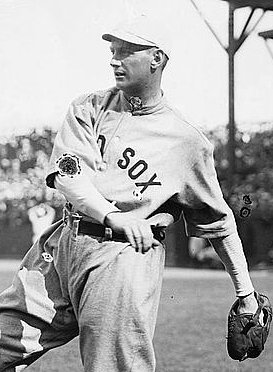
- First baseman
- Born: May 23, 1885; Grafton, Massachusetts, U.S.
- Died: January 26, 1949 (aged 63); Worcester, Massachusetts, U.S.
- Batted: Right Threw: Right

MLB debut
- April 25, 1910, for the Boston Red Sox

Last MLB appearance
- September 7, 1915, for the Newark Pepper

MLB statistics
- Batting average: .261
- Home runs: 2
- Runs batted in: 117
- Stats at Baseball Reference

Teams
- Boston Red Sox (1910–1912); Pittsburgh Rebels (1914–1915)); Brooklyn Tip-Tops (1915); Newark Pepper (1915)

Career highlights and awards
- World Series champion (1912)

Hugh Bradley (May 23, 1885 – January 26, 1949) was an American professional baseball player. He played first base in Major League Baseball from 1910 to 1915. On April 26, 1912, he hit the first ever home run at Fenway Park. As a backup first baseman for the 1912 World Series champion Boston Red Sox, Bradley got off to a hot start to the season and had a chance to supplant player-manager Jake Stahl as the team's starter at the position, but his hitting fell off dramatically as the season went on.

== Sources ==
- Career statistics from MLB · Baseball Reference · Baseball Reference (Minors) · Retrosheet · Baseball Almanac
