= Cy Rheam =

American baseball player (1893–1947)

- Infielder / Outfielder
- Born: September 28, 1893; Pittsburgh, Pennsylvania, US
- Died: October 23, 1947 (aged 54); Pittsburgh, Pennsylvania, US
- Batted: Right Threw: Right

MLB debut
- May 20, 1914, for the Pittsburgh Rebels

Last MLB appearance
- October 3, 1915, for the Pittsburgh Rebels

MLB statistics
- Batting average: .201
- Home runs: 1
- Runs batted in: 25
- Stats at Baseball Reference

Teams
- Pittsburgh Rebels (1914–1915)

Kenneth Johnston Rheam (September 28, 1893 – October 23, 1947) was an American professional baseball player from 1914 to 1915. He went to Indiana University of Pennsylvania. He was born in Pittsburgh, Pennsylvania and died in Pittsburgh, Pennsylvania. He played for the Pittsburgh Rebels.
