= Walt Dickson =

American baseball player

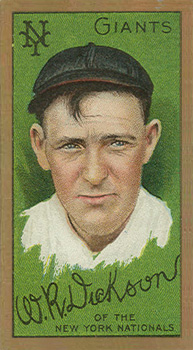
- Pitcher
- Born: December 3, 1878; New Summerfield, Texas, U.S.
- Died: December 9, 1918 (aged 40); Ardmore, Oklahoma, U.S.
- Batted: Right Threw: Right

MLB debut
- April 26, 1910, for the New York Giants

Last MLB appearance
- October 2, 1915, for the Pittsburgh Rebels

MLB statistics
- Win–loss record: 26-50
- Earned run average: 3.60
- Strikeouts: 202
- Stats at Baseball Reference

Teams
- New York Giants (1910); Boston Braves (1912–1913); Pittsburgh Rebels (1914–1915)

Walter Raleigh Dickson (December 3, 1878 – December 9, 1918), nicknamed "Hickory", was an American Major League Baseball player who played pitcher from 1910-1915. Dickson played for the Boston Braves, Pittsburgh Rebels, and New York Giants.
