= Cy Barger =

American baseball player (1885–1964)

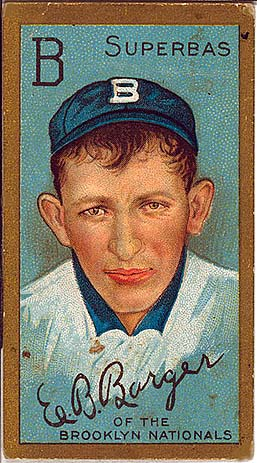
- Cy Barger, in a baseball card issued by American Tobacco Company in 1911.
- Pitcher
- Born: May 18, 1885; Jamestown, Kentucky, U.S.
- Died: September 23, 1964 (aged 79); Columbia, Kentucky, U.S.
- Batted: Left Threw: Right

MLB debut
- August 30, 1906, for the New York Highlanders

Last MLB appearance
- October 2, 1915, for the Pittsburgh Rebels

MLB statistics
- Win–loss record: 46–63
- Earned run average: 3.56
- Strikeouts: 297
- Stats at Baseball Reference

Teams
- New York Highlanders (1906–1907); Brooklyn Superbas/Dodgers (1910–1912); Pittsburgh Rebels (1914–1915)

Eros Bolivar "Cy" Barger (May 18, 1885 – September 23, 1964) was an American right-handed starting pitcher and left-handed batter who played in the American League for the New York Highlanders (1906–07); in the National League with the Brooklyn teams Superbas (1910) and Dodgers (1911–12), and for the Pittsburgh Rebels (1914–15) in the Federal League.

A native of Jamestown, Kentucky, Barger was a dead-ball era pitcher who also played first base and shortstop as well as the outfield. He went to college at Transylvania University and debuted in the majors on August 30, 1906. With the Highlanders, he had a 0–0 record in 11 innings pitched over parts of two seasons.

In 1909, Barger led Rochester to the Eastern League title with 23 wins and minuscule 1.00 earned run average. Again in the majors with the 1910 Superbas, Barger enjoyed a career year with 15 victories and a 2.88 ERA, winning 11 games the following season. With the Rebels, he won 19 games from 1914 to 1915.

Barger died at Adair Memorial Hospital in Columbia, Kentucky on September 23, 1964 following a long illness.

| Preceded by Nap Rucker | Brooklyn Trolley Dodgers Opening Day; Starting pitcher 1911 | Succeeded by Nap Rucker |
