= Frank Allen (baseball) =

American baseball player (1889–1933)

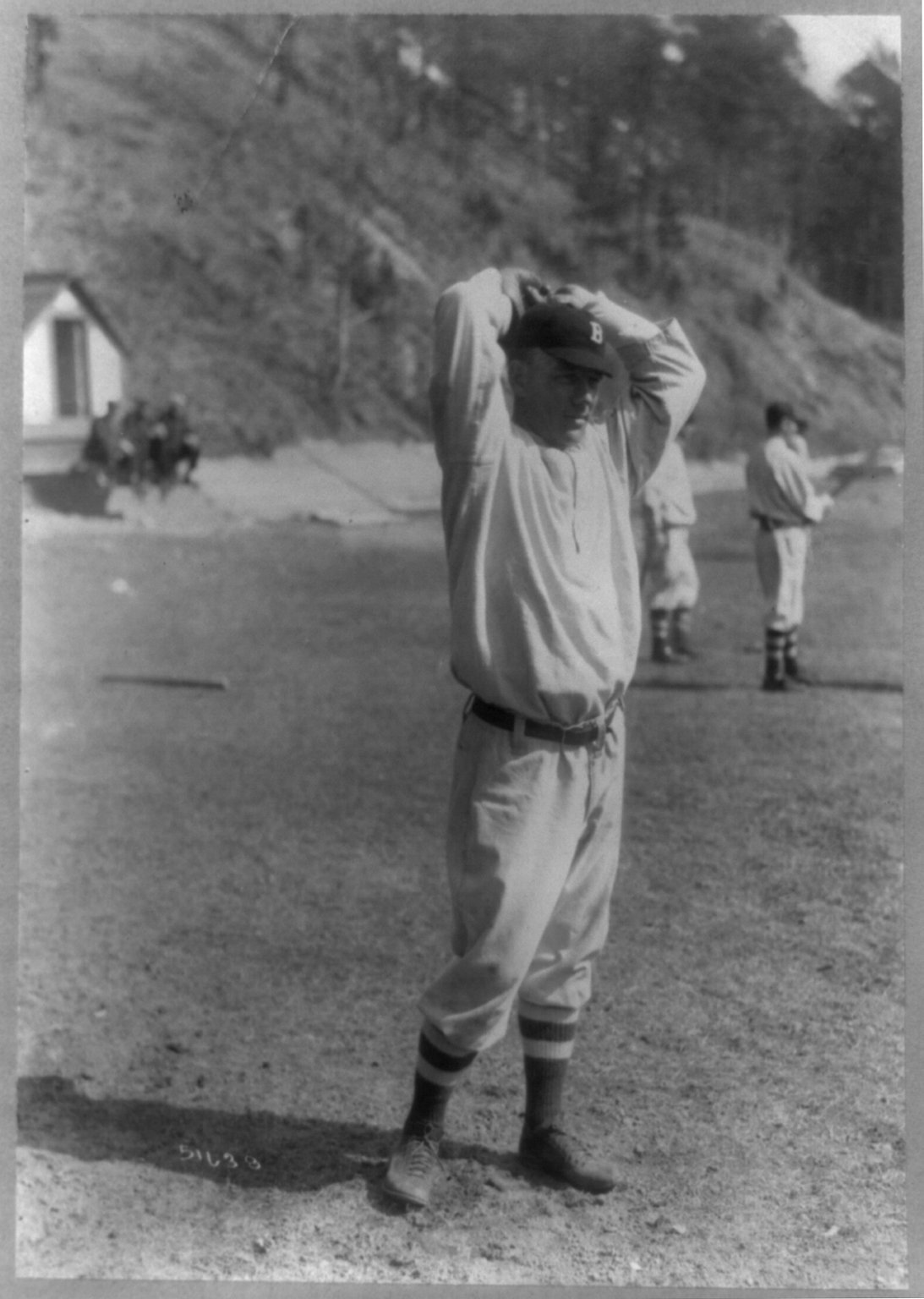
- Allen in Brooklyn uniform
- Pitcher
- Born: August 26, 1889; Newbern, Alabama, U.S.
- Died: July 30, 1933 (aged 43); Gainesville, Alabama, U.S.
- Batted: Right Threw: Left

MLB debut
- April 24, 1912, for the Brooklyn Dodgers

Last MLB appearance
- September 19, 1917, for the Boston Braves

MLB statistics
- Win–loss record: 50–67
- Earned run average: 2.93
- Strikeouts: 457
- Stats at Baseball Reference

Teams
- Brooklyn Dodgers/Robins (1912–1914); Pittsburgh Rebels (1914–1915); Boston Braves (1916–1917)

Frank Leon Allen (August 26, 1889 – July 30, 1933) was an American pitcher in Major League Baseball. He pitched from 1912 to 1917 for the Brooklyn Dodgers/Robins, Pittsburgh Rebels and Boston Braves.

He was the first person to throw a no-hitter and no-run game in the Federal League.

| Preceded by Rube Marquard | No-hitter pitcher April 24, 1915 | Succeeded by Claude Hendrix |
