= Howie Camnitz =

American baseball player (1881–1960)

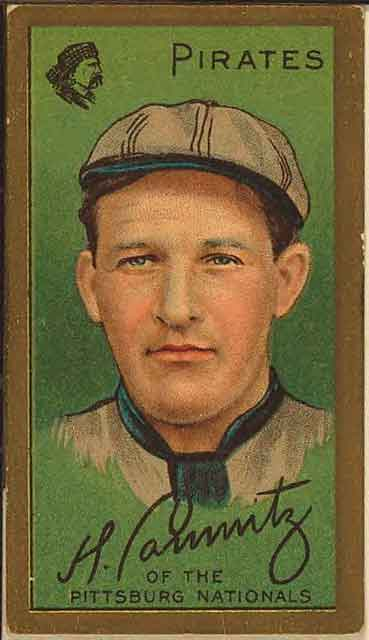
- Pitcher
- Born: August 22, 1881; Covington, Kentucky, U.S.
- Died: March 2, 1960 (aged 78); Louisville, Kentucky, U.S.
- Batted: Right Threw: Right

MLB debut
- April 22, 1904, for the Pittsburgh Pirates

Last MLB appearance
- May 3, 1915, for the Pittsburgh Rebels

MLB statistics
- Win–loss record: 133–106
- Earned run average: 2.75
- Strikeouts: 915
- Stats at Baseball Reference

Teams
- Pittsburgh Pirates (1904, 1906–1913); Philadelphia Phillies (1913); Pittsburgh Rebels (1914–1915)

Career highlights and awards
- World Series champion (1909)

Samuel Howard Camnitz (August 22, 1881 – March 2, 1960) was an American starting pitcher in Major League Baseball for the Pittsburgh Pirates and the Philadelphia Phillies (1913) in the National League and for the Pittsburgh Rebels (1914–15) in the Federal League. A native of Covington, Kentucky, he batted and threw right-handed. In an 11-season career, Camnitz posted a 133–106 record with 915 strikeouts and a 2.75 earned run average in 2085 1/3 innings pitched.

Camnitz was born in Covington, Kentucky, the son of Henry and Elizabeth Camnitz. His father was a printer and his brother Harry Camnitz was also a baseball pitcher. Howie Camnitz received the nickname "Rosebud" due to his bright red hair. He was often referred to as "the Kentucky Rosebud" in his playing career.

Camnitz pitched briefly with the Pittsburgh Pirates in 1904 before being sent to the minor leagues to disguise his best pitch, a curveball. He was called up to the Pirates in September 1906. In his first full season in 1907, he had a 13–8 record with a 2.15 earned run average in 180 innings, including a five-inning no-hitter against the New York Giants on August 23. The next year, he went 16–9 with a 1.56 earned run average and 15 complete games in 19 starts.

With an excellent curveball, Camnitz collected three 20-win seasons for the Pittsburgh Pirates from 1909 to 1912, leading his team to the 1909 World Series after winning 25 games in the regular season and tying Christy Mathewson for the National League lead in winning percentage at .806.

Camnitz pitched at least 240 innings every year from 1908 to 1914, with a career-high 283 innings in 1909, winning 20 games in 1911 and 22 in 1912. After a 6–17 start in 1913, he was sent by the Pirates to the Philadelphia Phillies in midseason. He pitched in nine games for the Phillies and had a 3–3 record, then jumped to the Pittsburgh Rebels of the Federal League in 1914 and posted a 14–19 mark.

He retired in 1915 after being accused of violating team rules. Camnitz moved to Louisville, Kentucky and became an automobile salesman, working for 40 years. He died on March 2, 1960, in Louisville at the age of 78 and is buried at Cave Hill Cemetery.
