= Marty Berghammer =

American baseball player (1888–1957)

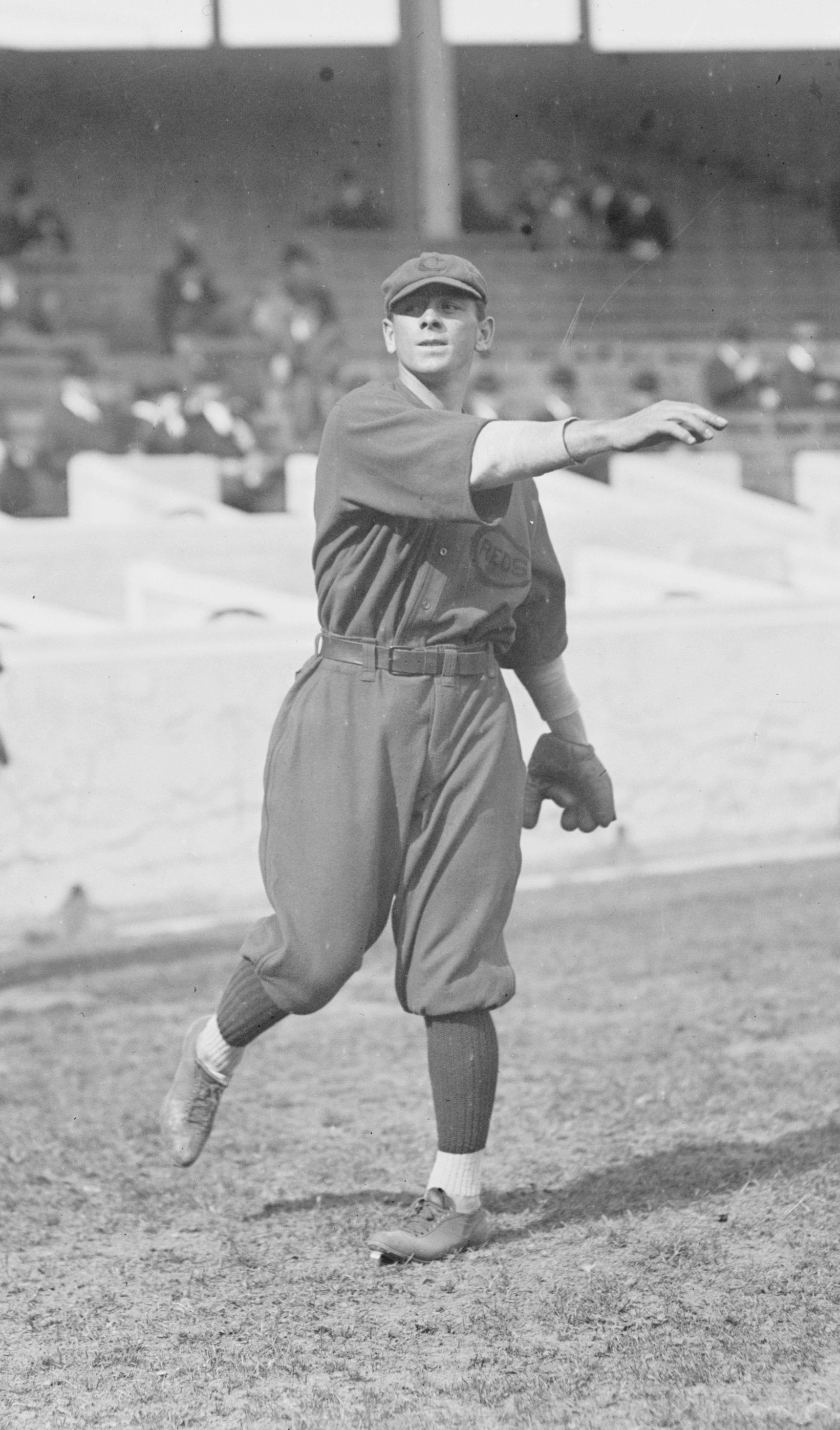
- Shortstop
- Born: June 18, 1888; Elliott, Pennsylvania, U.S.
- Died: December 21, 1957 (aged 69); Pittsburgh, Pennsylvania, U.S.
- Batted: Left Threw: Right

MLB debut
- September 8, 1911, for the Chicago White Sox

Last MLB appearance
- October 3, 1915, for the Pittsburgh Rebels

MLB statistics
- Batting average: .233
- Stolen bases: 46
- Runs batted in: 52
- Stats at Baseball Reference

Teams
- Chicago White Sox (1911); Cincinnati Reds (1913–1914); Pittsburgh Rebels (FL) (1915)

Martin Andrew Berghammer (June 18, 1888 – December 21, 1957) was an American Major League Baseball shortstop who played for four seasons. He played for the Chicago White Sox in 1911 and the Cincinnati Reds from 1913 to 1914. He also played for the Pittsburgh Rebels of the Federal League in 1915.

Berghammer was a member of the St. Paul Saints club for ten seasons before starting his managerial career. He was obtained by the Saints from the Pittsburgh Feds and played as a shortstop in St. Paul, but shifted to second base in 1918 and developed a reputation as one of the best second sackers in the league. Known as the Tulsa Spitfire, he became the manager of the Milwaukee Brewers in 1929, taking over as director of the club after Jack Lelivelt resigned due to poor health. As manager of the Tulsa club he won two pennants.
