= Claude Berry =

American baseball player (1880–1974)

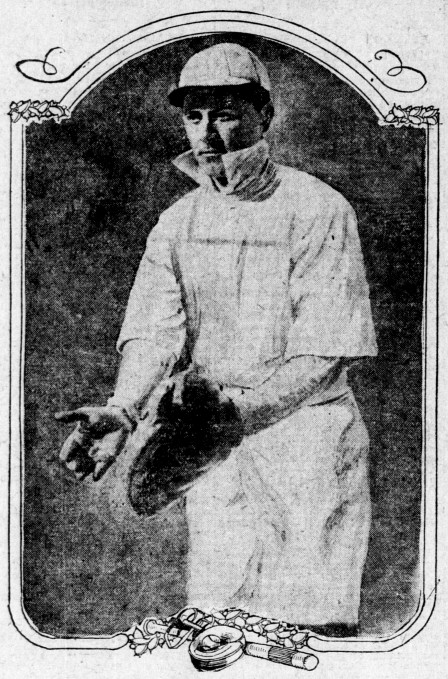
- Catcher
- Born: February 14, 1880; Losantville, Indiana, U.S.
- Died: February 1, 1974 (aged 93); Richmond, Indiana, U.S.
- Batted: Right Threw: Right

MLB debut
- April 22, 1904, for the Chicago White Sox

Last MLB appearance
- October 3, 1915, for the Pittsburgh Rebels

MLB statistics
- Batting average: .219
- Home runs: 3
- Runs batted in: 65
- Stats at Baseball Reference

Teams
- Chicago White Sox (1904); Philadelphia Athletics (1906–1907); Pittsburgh Rebels (1914–1915)

Claude Elzy Berry (February 14, 1880 – February 1, 1974), born in Losantville, Indiana, was an American catcher for the Chicago White Sox (1904), Philadelphia Athletics (1906–07) and Pittsburgh Rebels (1914–15).

In 5 seasons he played in 245 Games and had 753 At Bats, 72 Runs, 165 Hits, 31 Doubles, 10 Triples, 3 Home Runs, 65 RBI, 14 Stolen Bases, 60 Walks, .219 Batting Average, .279 On-base percentage, .299 Slugging Percentage, 225 Total Bases and 30 Sacrifice Hits.

He died in Richmond, Indiana at the age of 93.
