= Rebel Oakes =

American baseball player (1883–1948)

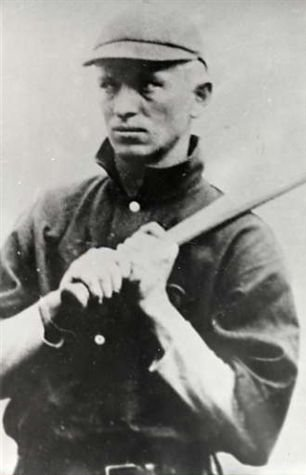
- Center fielder
- Born: December 17, 1883; Lisbon, Louisiana, U.S.
- Died: March 1, 1948 (aged 64); Lisbon, Louisiana, U.S.
- Batted: Right Threw: Right

MLB debut
- April 14, 1909, for the Cincinnati Reds

Last MLB appearance
- October 3, 1915, for the Pittsburgh Rebels

MLB statistics
- Batting average: .279
- Home runs: 15
- Runs batted in: 397
- Stats at Baseball Reference

Teams
- Cincinnati Reds (1909); St. Louis Cardinals (1910–1913); Pittsburgh Rebels (1914–1915)

Ennis Telfair "Rebel" Oakes (December 17, 1883 – March 1, 1948) was an American Major League Baseball player.

Oakes was born in Lisbon, Louisiana. After attending Louisiana Industrial Institute, which is now Louisiana Tech University, Rebel turned his attention to playing professional baseball.

== College career ==
Oakes's parents provided the means for him to enroll at Louisiana Industrial Institute (present-day Louisiana Tech University) in nearby Ruston, where he starred on both the school's football and baseball teams shortly after the turn of the century. He went on to become the first player from the school to reach the major leagues, one of nineteen former Louisiana Tech players to do so. Oakes made his professional debut with Hattiesburg of the Class-D Delta League in 1904.

== Professional career ==
Oakes eventually reached the Majors when he was traded to the Cincinnati Reds in 1909. The following year, he was traded to the St. Louis Cardinals along with future Hall of Fame manager Miller Huggins for Fred Beebe. He played for the Cardinals for four seasons as a starting center fielder, then jumped to the Federal League when it was established in 1914. After two seasons as the player-manager for the Pittsburgh Rebels, named in Oakes' honor, the league folded and Rebel never returned to Major League Baseball.

In 986 games over seven major league seasons, Oakes posted a .279 batting average (1011-for-3619) with 428 runs, 112 doubles, 42 triples, 15 home runs, 397 RBI, 163 stolen bases and 265 bases on balls. He finished his career with a .961 fielding percentage as an outfielder.

After his Major League Baseball career, Oakes moved on to play and manage for the Denver Bears of the Western League in 1916, where his team finished fourth and he led the league in hits with 205. He died at the age of 64 in Lisbon, Louisiana, and is interred at Rocky Springs Cemetery in Lisbon.

== See also ==
- List of Major League Baseball player-managers
