= Pittsburgh Rebels =

Baseball club in Pennsylvania, 1913–1915

Information
- Location: Pittsburgh, Pennsylvania
- Founded: 1913
- Disbanded: 1915
- Former name: Pittsburgh Stogies (1913–1914); Pittsburgh Rebels (1914-1915)
- Former league: Federal League
- Former ballpark: Exposition Park
- Colors: Navy, white (1915)
- Ownership: C. B. Comstock & Edward Gwinner
- Manager: Doc Gessler (1914); Rebel Oakes (1914–15)

The Pittsburgh Rebels were a baseball club based in Pittsburgh, Pennsylvania, from 1913 to 1915. The team was a member of the short-lived Federal League. The team was originally called the Pittsburgh Stogies after an earlier Pittsburgh team that played in the Union Association in 1884, but became known as the Rebels by the end of the 1914 season. The team played all of its home games at Exposition Park, located on Pittsburgh's Northside. The Pittsburgh Pirates of the National League left the stadium for Forbes Field in 1909. After the Rebels left Exposition Park in 1915, the field was demolished and its property became part of the adjacent rail yards.

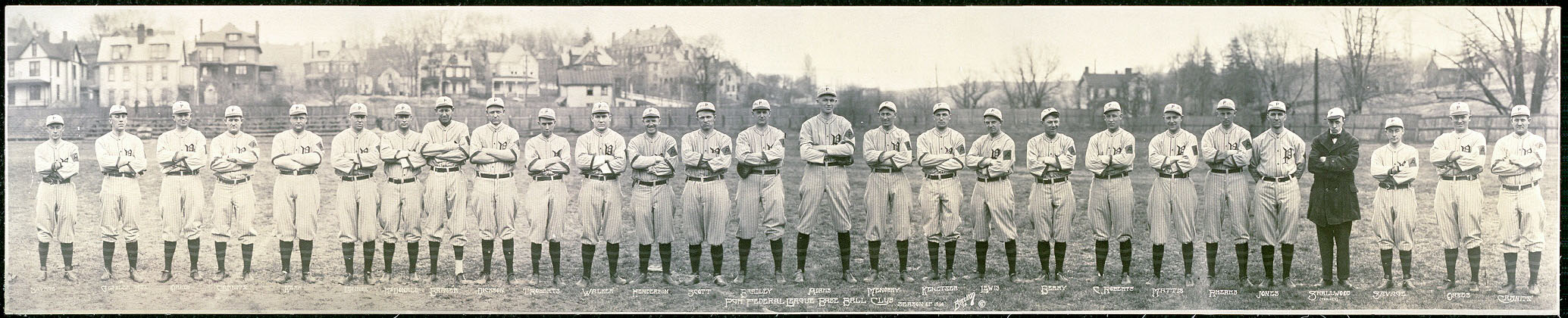

== History ==
=== Origins ===
The team's origins can be traced to the Pittsburgh Filipinos a short-lived minor league club in the independent United States Baseball League in 1912. The team was known as the Pittsburgh Filipinos in honor of their manager, Deacon Phillippe, a former pitcher with the Pittsburgh Pirates. The Filipinos finished in first place during the league's inaugural season, which lasted only one month, with a 19-7 record.

=== Federal League ===
The team joined the Federal League, which launched as an independent minor league in 1913, and were renamed the Stogies. They finished the season in last place with a 49–71 record in a 120-game season.

In early 1914, the Federal League president James A. Gilmore discussed with Robert B. Ward, owner of the Brooklyn Tip Tops, that he was concerned about the financial backing of the Stogies' franchise. Ward then found Edward Gwinner, a railroad contractor with deep pockets. Gwinner was then partnered with architect C. B. Comstock as the new backers of the Pittsburgh Stogies. Doc Gessler was named the Stogies' manager. However, he was fired after only one month. Gessler was replaced by player-manager, Rebel Oakes. The team then took on the nickname of the Rebels, after Oakes took over as the team's manager. With some strong financial backing, the team did not fare so well on the field. They ended up in seventh place (next to last) that season, with a 64-86 record.

During the 1915 season, the team finished in third position with an 86-67 mark, 0.5 games behind the first place Chicago Whales, who would go on to win the league pennant. That season Frank Allen pitched the first no hitter of the season, after the Rebels defeated the St. Louis Terriers 2-0 on April 24, 1915.

== Notable players ==
Some Rebels players had American and National League experience. Pitcher Cy Barger played two seasons with the New York Highlanders (later renamed the New York Yankees) and another three seasons with the Brooklyn Superbas-Dodgers before joining the Rebels. Meanwhile, fellow pitcher Howie Camnitz played for the Pittsburgh Pirates from 1904 until 1913 and was a member of their 1909 World Series team. Catcher Claude Berry had played for the Chicago White Sox in 1904 and the Philadelphia Athletics in 1906-07. First baseman Ed Konetchy, played for the St. Louis Cardinals and the Pirates, before playing for the Rebels. After the team and the league folded in 1915, Konetchy continued his playing career with the Boston Braves, Brooklyn Dodgers and Philadelphia Phillies.

== See also ==
- Pittsburgh Rebels all-time roster
- 1914 Pittsburgh Rebels season
- 1915 Pittsburgh Rebels season
