= Chicago Whales all-time roster =

List of baseball players

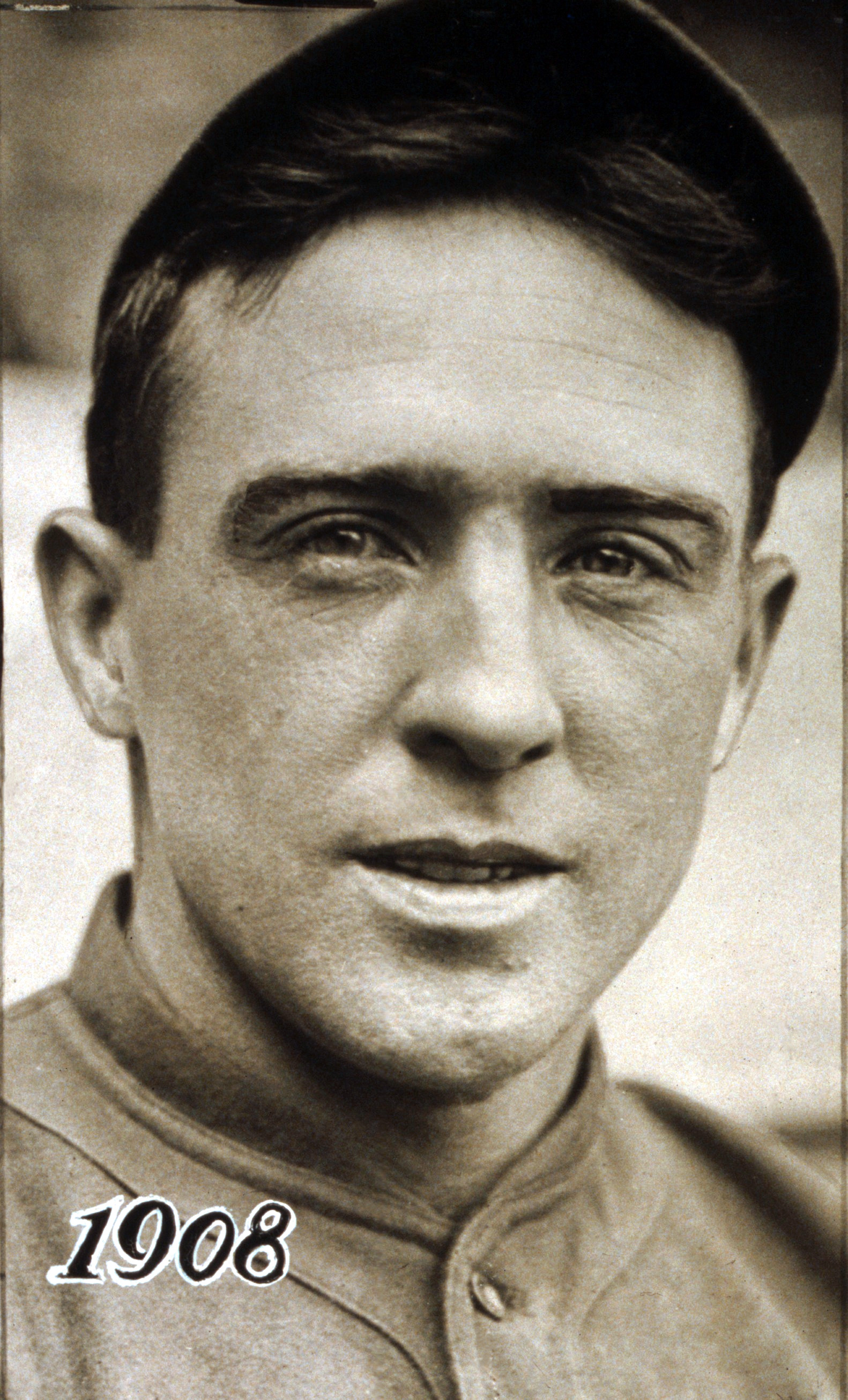
Joe Tinker played for and managed the Whales in 1914 and 1915.

The Chicago Whales were a Major League Baseball franchise that played in the Federal League during its two years of existence, 1914 and 1915. The following is a list of players and who appeared in at least one game for the franchise during this time. This includes the Chicago Federals, the name of the club in 1914.

== Keys ==
Abbreviations
| Name | Name of the player by official records |
| Position | Position that player played in the field |
| Seasons played | The seasons played for this franchise by the player |
| † | Elected to the Baseball Hall of Fame |
| † § | Indicates the player was both a player-manager and Hall of Famer |

Position
| C | Catcher | 1B | First baseman |
| 2B | Second baseman | 3B | Third baseman |
| SS | Shortstop | IF | Infielder |
| LF | Left fielder | CF | Center fielder |
| RF | Right fielder | OF | Outfielder |
| SP | Starting pitcher | RP | Relief pitcher |

== List of players ==
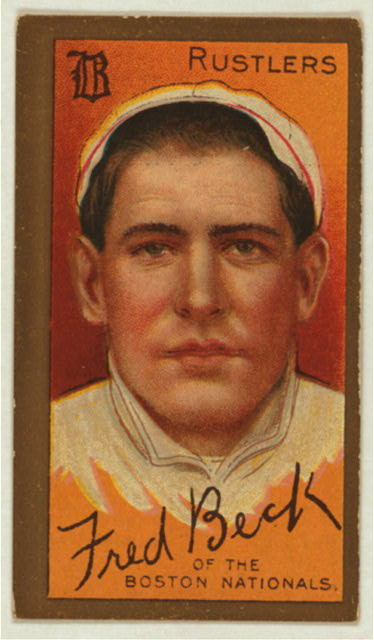
First baseman Fred Beck

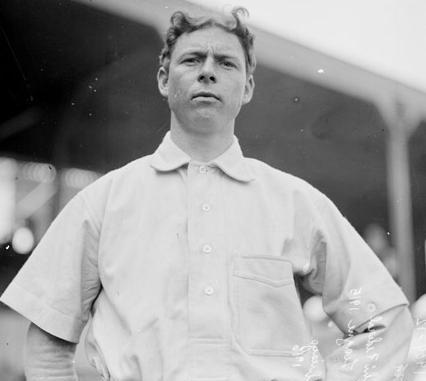
Starting pitcher Mordecai Brown

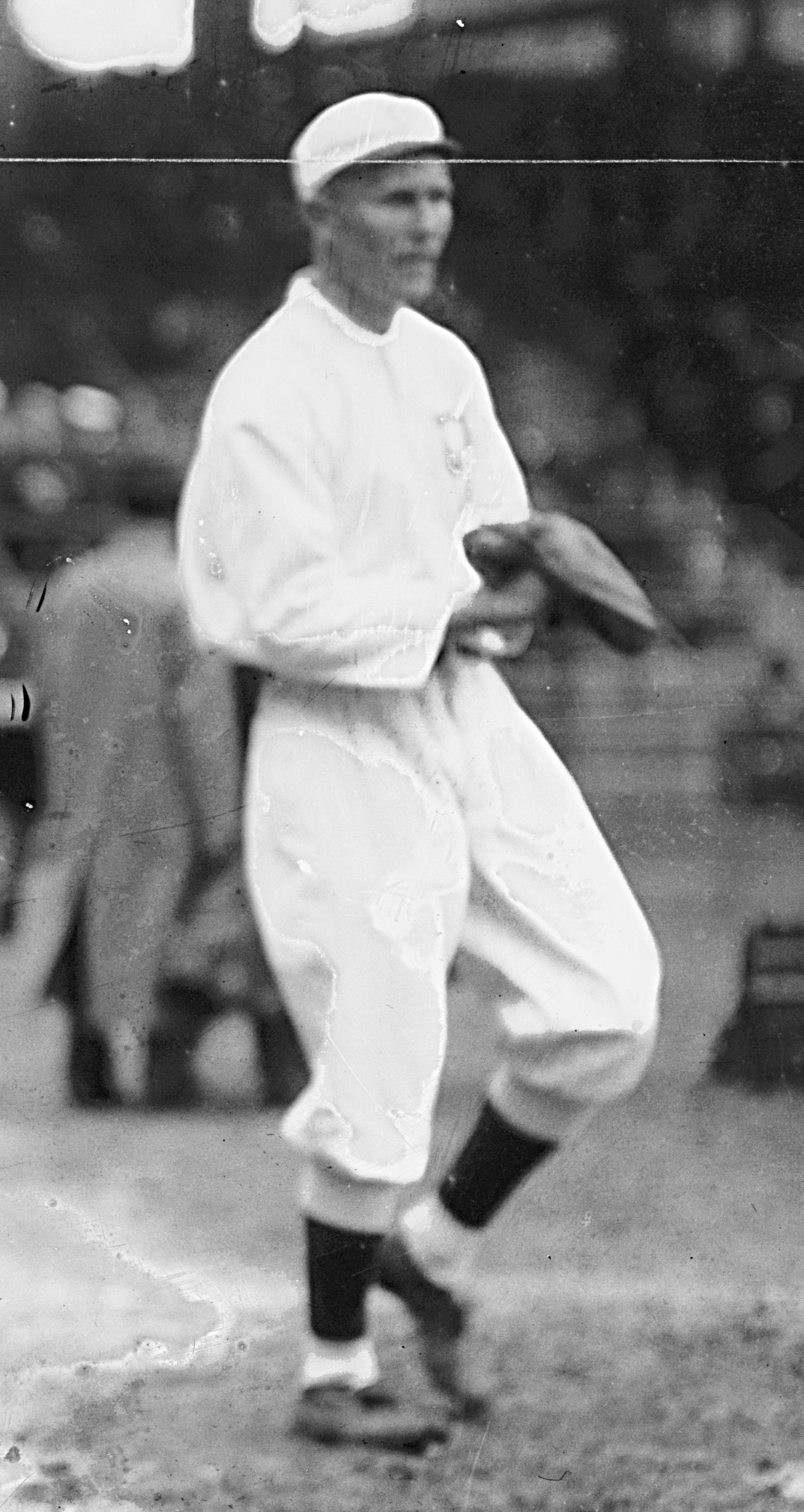
Catcher William Fischer

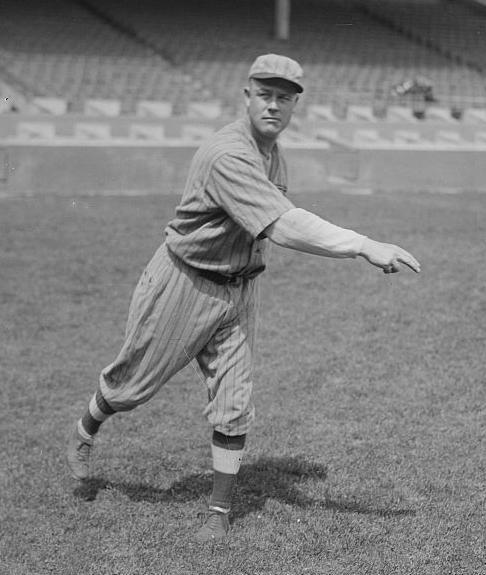
Starting pitcher Claude Hendrix

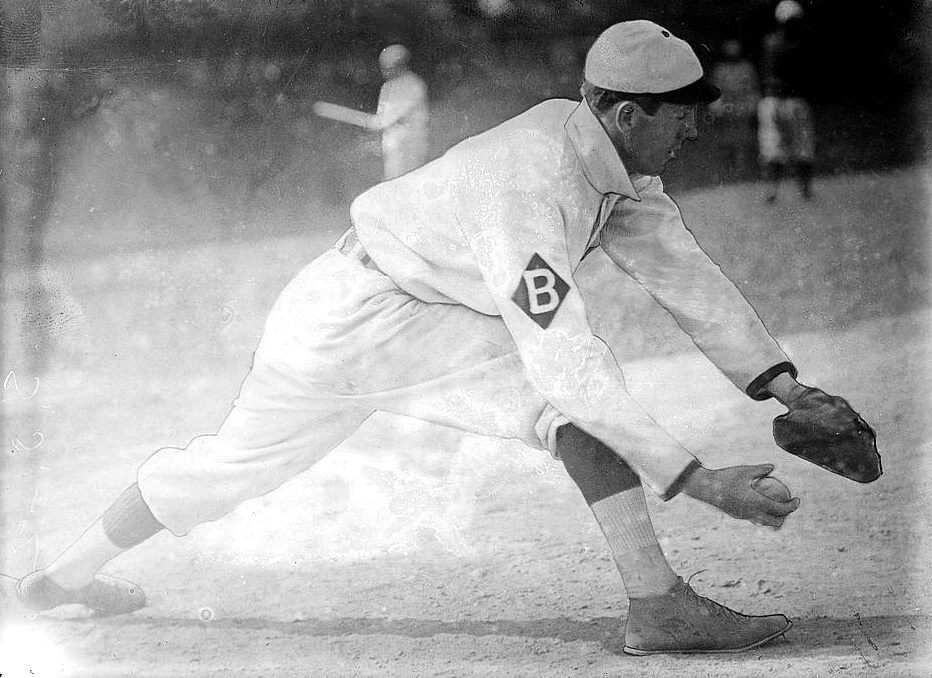
Starting pitcher George McConnell

| Player | Position | Seasons | Notes | Ref |
|---|---|---|---|---|
| Bill Bailey | P | 1915 | Bailey played five games in 1915 after coming over from the Baltimore Terrapins. | |
| Fred Beck | 1B/OF | 1914-1915 | Beck was the starting first baseman for the Whales' two seasons. | |
| Dave Black | P | 1914-1915 | Black pitched in 33 games for the Whales, and was traded to Baltimore shortly before the 1915 season ended. | |
| Bruno Block | C | 1914 | Block served as the backup catcher in 1914, his last major league season. | |
| Ad Brennan | P | 1914-1915 | Brennan made 91 appearances for the Philadelphia Phillies before jumping to the Federal League in 1914. | |
| Mordecai Brown † | P | 1915 | At 38, Brown went 17–8 for the Whales in 1915, his last full season in baseball. | |
| Clem Clemens | C | 1914-1915 | | |
| Mickey Doolan | SS | 1915 | | |
| Jack Farrell | 2B | 1914-1915 | | |
| William Fischer | C | 1915 | | |
| Max Fiske | P | 1914 | | |
| Max Flack | RF | 1914-1915 | | |
| Harry Fritz | 3B | 1914-1915 | | |
| Charlie Hanford | OF | 1915 | | |
| Arnold Hauser | SS | 1915 | | |
| Claude Hendrix | P | 1914-1915 | | |
| Bill Jackson | 1B | 1914-1915 | | |
| Rankin Johnson, Sr. | P | 1914-1915 | | |
| Jack Kading | 1B | 1914 | | |
| Leo Kavanagh | SS | 1914 | | |
| Erv Lange | P | 1914 | | |
| Les Mann | OF | 1915 | | |
| George McConnell | P | 1915 | | |
| Tom McGuire | P | 1914 | | |
| Charlie Pechous | 3B | 1915 | | |
| Mike Prendergast | P | 1914-1915 | | |
| Hans Rasmussen | P | 1915 | | |
| Skipper Roberts | C | 1914 | | |
| Dan Sherman | P | 1914 | | |
| Jimmy Smith | SS/2B | 1914-1915 | | |
| Jim Stanley | SS | 1914 | | |
| Joe Tinker †§ | SS | 1914-1915 | | |
| Austin Walsh | OF | 1914 | | |
| Doc Watson | P | 1914 | | |
| Joe Weiss | 1B | 1915 | | |
| Al Wickland | OF | 1914-1915 | | |
| Art Wilson | C | 1914-1915 | | |
| Tex Wisterzil | 3B | 1915 | | |
| Rollie Zeider | IF | 1914-1915 | | |
| Dutch Zwilling | CF | 1914-1915 | | |

== See also ==
Chicago Keeleys-minor league Federal League-players (1913)
