= 1915 Chicago Whales season =

1915 Chicago Whales
- Federal League Champions
- League: Federal League
- Ballpark: Weeghman Park
- City: Chicago, Illinois
- Record: 86–66 (.566)
- League place: 1st
- Owners: Charles Weeghman
- Managers: Joe Tinker

The 1915 Chicago Whales season was a season in American baseball. After not having an official nickname in 1914, the team officially became the Whales for the 1915 season. They finished the season with an 86–66 record, placing them in a statistical tie with the St. Louis Terriers for first place in the Federal League. However, since the Whales had a slightly better winning percentage, they were declared the league champions.

== Regular season ==
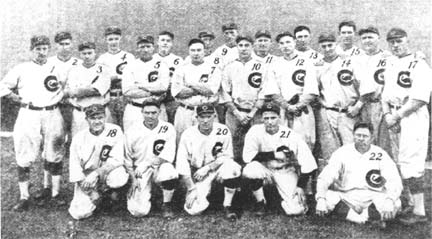
The 1915 Chicago Whales

=== Season standings ===
Federal League
Team	W	L	Pct.	GB	Home	Road
Chicago Whales	86	66	.566	—	44‍–‍32	42‍–‍34
St. Louis Terriers	87	67	.565	—	43‍–‍34	44‍–‍33
Pittsburgh Rebels	86	67	.562	½	45‍–‍31	41‍–‍36
Kansas City Packers	81	72	.529	5½	46‍–‍31	35‍–‍41
Newark Peppers	80	72	.526	6	40‍–‍39	40‍–‍33
Buffalo Blues	74	78	.487	12	37‍–‍40	37‍–‍38
Brooklyn Tip-Tops	70	82	.461	16	34‍–‍40	36‍–‍42
Baltimore Terrapins	47	107	.305	40	24‍–‍51	23‍–‍56

=== Record vs. opponents ===
1915 Federal League record Sources:
Team	BAL	BKF	BUF	CWH	KC	NWK	PRB	SLT
Baltimore	—	7–15	8–14	9–13	4–18	6–16	5–17	8–14
Brooklyn	15–7	—	9–11	7–15	11–11	12–10	9–13	7–15–1
Buffalo	14–8	11–9	—	8–14	11–11	11–11	9–13	10–12–1
Chicago	13–9	15–7	14–8	—	11–11	10–10–1	12–10–1	11–11–1
Kansas City	18–4	11–11	11–11	11–11	—	11–11	8–13	11–11
Newark	16–6	10–12	11–11	10–10–1	11–11	—	12–10–1	10–12–1
Pittsburgh	17–5	13–9	13–9	10–12–1	13–8	10–12–1	—	10–12–1
St. Louis	14–8	15–7–1	12–10–1	11–11–1	11–11	12–10–1	12–10–1	—

=== Roster ===
1915 Chicago Whales
Roster
Pitchers: Bill Bailey; Dave Black; Ad Brennan; Mordecai Brown; Claude Hendrix; Rankin Johnson; George McConnell; Mike Prendergast; Hans Rasmussen	Catchers: Clem Clemens; William Fischer; Art Wilson; Infielders: Fred Beck; Mickey Doolan; Jack Farrell; Harry Fritz; Arnold Hauser; Bill Jackson; Charlie Pechous; Jimmy Smith; Joe Tinker; Joe Weiss; Tex Wisterzil; Rollie Zeider	Outfielders: Max Flack; Charlie Hanford; Les Mann; Al Wickland; Dutch Zwilling	Manager: Joe Tinker

== Player stats ==
=== Batting ===
==== Starters by position ====
Note: Pos = Position; G = Games played; AB = At bats; H = Hits; Avg. = Batting average; HR = Home runs; RBI = Runs batted in

Pos	Player	G	AB	H	Avg.	HR	RBI
C	Art Wilson	96	269	82	.305	7	31
1B	Fred Beck	121	373	83	.223	5	38
2B	Rollie Zeider	129	494	112	.227	0	34
SS	Jimmy Smith	95	318	69	.217	4	30
3B	Tex Wisterzil	49	164	40	.244	0	14
OF	Les Mann	135	470	144	.306	4	58
OF	Dutch Zwilling	150	548	157	.286	13	94
OF	Max Flack	141	523	164	.314	3	45

==== Other batters ====
Note: G = Games played; AB = At bats; H = Hits; Avg. = Batting average; HR = Home runs; RBI = Runs batted in

Player	G	AB	H	Avg.	HR	RBI
William Fischer	105	292	96	.329	4	50
Harry Fritz	79	236	59	.250	3	26
Jack Farrell	70	222	48	.216	0	14
Charlie Hanford	77	179	43	.240	0	22
Bill Jackson	50	98	16	.163	1	12
Al Wickland	30	86	21	.244	1	5
Mickey Doolin	24	86	23	.267	0	9
Joe Weiss	29	85	19	.224	0	11
Joe Tinker	31	67	18	.269	0	9
Arnold Hauser	23	54	11	.204	0	4
Charlie Pechous	18	51	9	.176	0	4
Clem Clemens	11	22	3	.136	0	3

=== Pitching ===
==== Starting pitchers ====
Note: G = Games pitched; IP = Innings pitched; W = Wins; L = Losses; ERA = Earned run average; SO = Strikeouts

Player	G	IP	W	L	ERA	SO
George McConnell	44	303.0	25	10	2.20	151
Claude Hendrix	40	285.0	16	15	3.00	107
Mike Prendergast	42	253.2	14	12	2.48	95
Mordecai Brown	35	236.1	17	8	2.09	95
Ad Brennan	19	106.0	3	9	3.74	40
Bill Bailey	5	33.1	3	1	2.16	24

==== Other pitchers ====
Note: G = Games pitched; IP = Innings pitched; W = Wins; L = Losses; ERA = Earned run average; SO = Strikeouts

Player	G	IP	W	L	ERA	SO
Dave Black	25	121.1	6	7	2.45	43
Rankin Johnson	11	57.0	2	4	4.42	19

==== Relief pitchers ====
Note: G = Games pitched; W = Wins; L = Losses; SV = Saves; ERA = Earned run average; SO = Strikeouts

Player	G	W	L	SV	ERA	SO
Hans Rasmussen	2	0	0	0	13.50	2

Preceded by Indianapolis Hoosiers; 1914	Federal League Championship Season; 1915	Succeeded by League folded
