= 1914 Chicago Federals season =

1914 Chicago Federals
- League: Federal League
- Ballpark: Weeghman Park
- City: Chicago, Illinois
- Record: 87–67 (.565)
- League place: 2nd
- Owners: Charles Weeghman
- Managers: Joe Tinker

The 1914 Chicago Federals season was a season in American baseball. Chicago finished 87–67, good for 2nd place in the Federal League, just 1½ games behind the Indianapolis Hoosiers.

== Regular season ==
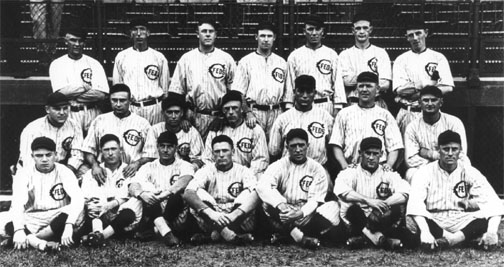
The 1914 Chicago Federals

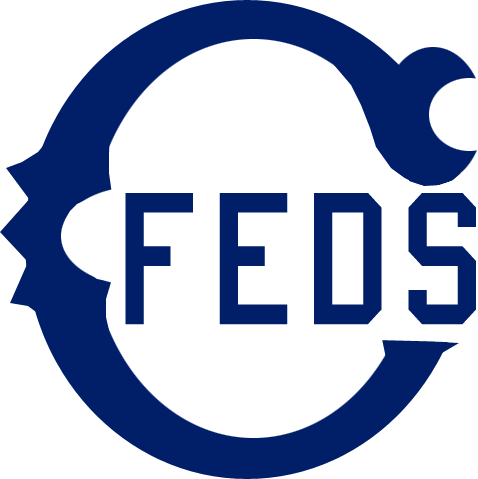
Chicago Federals (whales) logo

=== Season standings ===
Federal League
Team	W	L	Pct.	GB	Home	Road
Indianapolis Hoosiers	88	65	.575	—	53‍–‍23	35‍–‍42
Chicago Federals	87	67	.565	1½	43‍–‍34	44‍–‍33
Baltimore Terrapins	84	70	.545	4½	53‍–‍26	31‍–‍44
Buffalo Buffeds	80	71	.530	7	47‍–‍29	33‍–‍42
Brooklyn Tip-Tops	77	77	.500	11½	47‍–‍32	30‍–‍45
Kansas City Packers	67	84	.444	20	37‍–‍36	30‍–‍48
Pittsburgh Rebels	64	86	.427	22½	37‍–‍37	27‍–‍49
St. Louis Terriers	62	89	.411	25	32‍–‍43	30‍–‍46

=== Record vs. opponents ===
1914 Federal League record Sources:
Team	BAL	BKF	BUF	CWH	IND	KC	PRB	SLT
Baltimore	—	9–13	14–8–1	12–10	10–12–1	12–10	10–12–2	17–5–1
Brooklyn	13–9	—	11–11–1	9–13	3–19	11–11–1	17–5–1	13–9
Buffalo	8–14–1	11–11–1	—	10–12–1	11–10	12–10–1	13–7	15–7
Chicago	10–12	13–9	12–10–1	—	13–9–1	14–8	12–10	13–9–1
Indianapolis	12–10–2	19–3	10–11	9–13–1	—	13–9–1	12–10	13–9
Kansas City	10–12	11–11	10–12–1	8–14	9–13–1	—	11–10	8–12
Pittsburgh	12–10–2	5–17	7–13–1	10–12	10–12	10–11	—	10–11–1
St. Louis	5–17–1	9–13	7–15	9–13–1	9–13	12–8	11–10	—

=== Roster ===
1914 Chicago Federals
Roster
Pitchers: Dave Black; Ad Brennan; Max Fiske; Claude Hendrix; Rankin Johnson; Erv Lange; Tom McGuire; Mike Prendergast; Dan Sherman; Doc Watson	Catchers: Bruno Block; Clem Clemens; Art Wilson; Infielders: Fred Beck; Jack Farrell; Harry Fritz; Leo Kavanagh; Jimmy Smith; Jim Stanley; Joe Tinker; Rollie Zeider	Outfielders: Max Flack; Bill Jackson; Austin Walsh; Al Wickland; Dutch Zwilling; Other batters: Jack Kading; Skipper Roberts	Manager: Joe Tinker

== Player stats ==
=== Batting ===
==== Starters by position ====
Note: Pos = Position; G = Games played; AB = At bats; H = Hits; Avg. = Batting average; HR = Home runs; RBI = Runs batted in

Pos	Player	G	AB	H	Avg.	HR	RBI
C	Art Wilson	137	440	128	.291	10	64
1B	Fred Beck	157	555	155	.279	11	77
2B	Jack Farrell	156	524	123	.235	0	35
SS	Joe Tinker	126	438	112	.256	2	46
3B	Rollie Zeider	119	452	124	.274	1	36
OF	Al Wickland	157	536	148	.276	6	68
OF	Dutch Zwilling	154	592	185	.313	16	95
OF	Max Flack	134	502	124	.247	2	39

==== Other batters ====
Note: G = Games played; AB = At bats; H = Hits; Avg. = Batting average; HR = Home runs; RBI = Runs batted in

Player	G	AB	H	Avg.	HR	RBI
Harry Fritz	65	174	37	.213	0	13
Austin Walsh	57	121	29	.240	1	10
Bruno Block	45	106	21	.198	0	14
Jim Stanley	54	98	19	.194	0	4
Clem Clemens	13	27	4	.148	0	2
Bill Jackson	26	25	1	.040	0	1
Leo Kavanagh	5	11	3	.273	0	1
Jimmy Smith	3	6	3	.500	0	1
Skipper Roberts	4	3	1	.333	0	1
Jack Kading	3	3	0	.000	0	0

=== Pitching ===
==== Starting pitchers ====
Note: G = Games pitched; IP = Innings pitched; W = Wins; L = Losses; ERA = Earned run average; SO = Strikeouts

Player	G	IP	W	L	ERA	SO
Claude Hendrix	49	362.0	29	10	1.69	189
Doc Watson	26	172.0	9	8	2.04	69
Rankin Johnson	16	120.0	9	5	1.58	60
Dan Sherman	1	0.1	0	1	0.00	0

==== Other pitchers ====
Note: G = Games pitched; IP = Innings pitched; W = Wins; L = Losses; ERA = Earned run average; SO = Strikeouts

Player	G	IP	W	L	ERA	SO
Max Fiske	38	198.0	12	12	3.14	87
Erv Lange	36	190.0	12	11	2.23	87
Mike Prendergast	30	136.0	5	9	2.38	71
Tom McGuire	24	131.1	5	6	3.70	37
Ad Brennan	16	85.2	5	5	3.57	31

==== Relief pitchers ====
Note: G = Games pitched; W = Wins; L = Losses; SV = Saves; ERA = Earned run average; SO = Strikeouts

Player	G	W	L	SV	ERA	SO
Dave Black	8	1	0	0	6.12	19
