= List of Major League Baseball players (F) =

The following is a list of Major League Baseball players, retired or active. As of the end of the 2011 season, there have been 629 players with a last name that begins with F who have been on a major league roster at some point.

== F ==
- Jay Faatz
- Red Faber β
- Jorge Fábregas
- Bunny Fabrique
- Roy Face
- Lenny Faedo
- Bill Fahey
- Brandon Fahey
- Ferris Fain
- George Fair
- Rags Faircloth
- Jim Fairey
- Ron Fairly
- Anton Falch
- Pete Falcone
- Bibb Falk
- Cy Falkenberg
- Brian Falkenborg
- Bob Fallon
- Charlie Fallon
- George Fallon
- Pete Falsey
- Rikkert Faneyte
- Cliff Fannin
- Jim Fanning
- Stan Fansler
- Carmen Fanzone
- Monty Fariss
- Alex Farmer
- Ed Farmer
- Mike Farmer
- Kyle Farnsworth
- Jim Farr
- Steve Farr
- Sid Farrar
- Doc Farrell
- Duke Farrell
- Jack Farrell (1879–1889 2B)
- Jack Farrell (OF)
- Jack Farrell (1874 2B)
- John Farrell (2B)
- John Farrell (P)
- Kerby Farrell
- Turk Farrell
- John Farrow
- Sal Fasano
- Frederick Fass
- Jeff Fassero
- Jim Faulkner
- Charles Victory Faust
- Ernie Fazio
- Carlos Febles
- Dutch Fehring
- Ryan Feierabend
- Mike Felder
- Marv Felderman
- Harry Feldman
- Scott Feldman
- Pedro Feliciano
- Gus Felix
- Junior Félix
- Pedro Feliz
- Bob Feller β
- Happy Felsch
- John Felske
- Terry Felton
- Frank Fennelly
- Bobby Fenwick
- Alex Ferguson
- Bob Ferguson (IF)
- Bob Ferguson (P)
- Charlie Ferguson
- George Ferguson
- Joe Ferguson
- Félix Fermín
- Ramón Fermín
- Alex Fernandez
- Chico Fernández
- Frank Fernandez
- Jared Fernández
- Jose Fernandez
- Nanny Fernandez
- Osvaldo Fernández
- Sid Fernandez
- Tony Fernández
- Al Ferrara
- Don Ferrarese
- Anthony Ferrari
- Mike Ferraro
- Rick Ferrell β
- Wes Ferrell
- Sergio Ferrer
- Tom Ferrick
- Bob Ferris
- Hobe Ferris
- Dave Ferriss
- Alex Ferson
- Lou Fette
- Mike Fetters
- Willy Fetzer
- Chick Fewster
- Neil Fiala
- John Fick
- Robert Fick
- Mark Fidrych
- Jim Field
- Nate Field
- Cecil Fielder
- Prince Fielder
- Bruce Fields
- Jocko Fields
- Josh Fields
- Alfredo Fígaro
- Mike Figga
- Chone Figgins
- Ed Figueroa
- Jesús Figueroa
- Luis Figueroa
- Nelson Figueroa
- Jeremy Fikac
- Bob File
- Tom Filer
- Steve Filipowicz
- Mark Filley
- Dana Fillingim
- Pete Filson
- Jack Fimple
- Joel Finch
- Tommy Fine
- Rollie Fingers β
- Jim Finigan
- Herman Fink
- Pembroke Finlayson
- Bob Finley
- Chuck Finley
- Steve Finley
- Neal Finn
- Happy Finneran
- Hal Finney
- Lou Finney
- Gar Finnvold
- Mike Fiore
- Tony Fiore
- Jeff Fiorentino
- Steve Fireovid
- Dan Firova
- Bill Fischer
- Carl Fischer
- Hank Fischer
- Jeff Fischer
- Todd Fischer
- William Fischer
- Mike Fischlin
- John Fishel
- Leo Fishel
- Bob Fisher
- Brian Fisher
- Chauncey Fisher
- Cherokee Fisher
- Don Fisher
- Ed Fisher
- Eddie Fisher
- George Fisher
- Gus Fisher
- Jack Fisher
- Maurice Fisher
- Ray Fisher
- Showboat Fisher
- Tom Fisher (1904)
- Tom Fisher (1967)
- Carlton Fisk β
- Max Fiske
- Wes Fisler
- Ed Fitz Gerald
- Charlie Fitzberger
- Brian Fitzgerald
- Howie Fitzgerald
- John Fitzgerald (Rochester Broncos pitcher)
- John Fitzgerald (Boston Reds pitcher)
- John Fitzgerald (1950s pitcher)
- Matty Fitzgerald
- Mike Fitzgerald (C)
- Mike Fitzgerald (OF)
- Ray Fitzgerald
- Shaun Fitzmaurice
- Al Fitzmorris
- Ed Fitzpatrick
- Freddie Fitzsimmons
- Tom Fitzsimmons
- Max Flack
- Ira Flagstead
- John Flaherty
- Martin Flaherty
- Patsy Flaherty
- Al Flair
- Mike Flanagan
- Steamer Flanagan
- Tim Flannery
- Roy Flaskamper
- Jack Flater
- Frank Fleet
- Ángel Fleitas
- Bill Fleming
- Dave Fleming
- Huck Flener
- Art Fletcher
- Darrin Fletcher
- Elbie Fletcher
- Frank Fletcher
- Sam Fletcher
- Scott Fletcher
- Tom Fletcher
- Van Fletcher
- Elmer Flick β
- Lew Flick
- Don Flinn
- John Flinn
- Silver Flint
- Hilly Flitcraft
- Curt Flood
- Tim Flood
- Kevin Flora
- Don Florence
- Bernardo Flores
- Gil Flores
- Jesse Flores
- Jesús Flores
- Jose Flores
- Randy Flores
- Ron Flores
- Bryce Florie
- Ben Flowers
- Dickie Flowers
- Jake Flowers
- Wes Flowers
- Bobby Floyd
- Bubba Floyd
- Cliff Floyd
- Gavin Floyd
- Doug Flynn
- Jocko Flynn
- Mike Flynn
- Gene Fodge
- Jim Fogarty
- Josh Fogg
- Lee Fohl
- Hank Foiles
- Curry Foley
- John Foley
- Marv Foley
- Tom Foley (IF)
- Tom Foley (OF)
- Will Foley
- Tim Foli
- Rich Folkers
- Dee Fondy
- Lew Fonseca
- Joe Fontenot
- Mike Fontenot
- Ray Fontenot
- Chad Fonville
- Barry Foote
- Jesse Foppert
- Jim Foran
- P. J. Forbes
- Davy Force
- Ben Ford
- Bill Ford
- Curt Ford
- Dan Ford
- Dave Ford
- Hod Ford
- Lew Ford
- Matt Ford
- Russ Ford
- Ted Ford
- Wenty Ford
- Whitey Ford β
- Tom Fordham
- Brook Fordyce
- Brownie Foreman
- Frank Foreman
- Happy Foreman
- Mike Fornieles
- Bob Forsch
- Ken Forsch
- Terry Forster
- Ed Forsyth
- Tim Fortugno
- Bartolomé Fortunato
- Gary Fortune
- Tony Fossas
- Ray Fosse
- Casey Fossum
- Alan Foster
- Eddie Foster
- Elmer Foster
- George Foster
- John Foster
- Kevin Foster
- Leo Foster
- Roy Foster
- Rube Foster
- Steve Foster
- Bob Fothergill
- Steve Foucault
- Keith Foulke
- Jack Fournier
- Bill Fouser
- Dave Foutz
- Frank Foutz
- Art Fowler
- Boob Fowler
- Dexter Fowler
- Dick Fowler
- Jesse Fowler
- Alan Fowlkes
- Andy Fox
- Chad Fox
- Charlie Fox
- Eric Fox
- Henry Fox
- Howie Fox
- Jake Fox
- Nellie Fox β
- Pete Fox
- Terry Fox
- Jimmie Foxx β
- Joe Foy
- Paul Foytack
- Jeff Francis
- Ray Francis
- Ben Francisco
- Frank Francisco
- John Franco
- Julio Franco
- Matt Franco
- Jeff Francoeur
- Terry Francona
- Tito Francona
- Kevin Frandsen
- Fred Frankhouse
- Franklin
- Jack Franklin
- Ryan Franklin
- Wayne Franklin
- Herman Franks
- John Frascatore
- Chick Fraser
- Willie Fraser
- Jason Frasor
- George Frazier
- Joe Frazier
- Lou Frazier
- Vic Frazier
- Johnny Frederick
- Kevin Frederick
- Scott Fredrickson
- Roger Freed
- Bill Freehan
- Ryan Freel
- Buck Freeman
- Choo Freeman
- Freddie Freeman
- Hersh Freeman
- John Freeman
- Mark Freeman
- Marvin Freeman
- Gene Freese
- George Freese
- Jake Freeze
- Jim Fregosi
- Vern Freiburger
- Howard Freigau
- Alejandro Freire
- Dave Freisleben
- Tony Freitas
- Charlie French
- Jim French
- Larry French
- Ray French
- Walter French
- Benny Frey
- Lonny Frey
- Steve Frey
- Hanley Frias
- Pepe Frias
- Bernie Friberg
- Marion Fricano
- Jim Fridley
- Pat Friel
- Bob Friend
- Owen Friend
- John Frill
- Frankie Frisch β
- Danny Frisella
- Harry Fritz
- Larry Fritz
- Bill Froats
- Doug Frobel
- Todd Frohwirth
- Art Fromme
- Dave Frost
- Emiliano Fruto
- Jerry Fry
- Jeff Frye
- Travis Fryman
- Woodie Fryman
- Charlie Fuchs
- Brian Fuentes
- Mike Fuentes
- Tito Fuentes
- Oscar Fuhr
- Kosuke Fukudome
- Kazuo Fukumori
- Jeff Fulchino
- Sam Fuld
- Ed Fuller
- Frank Fuller
- John Fulgham
- Nig Fuller
- Shorty Fuller
- Curt Fullerton
- Chick Fullis
- Brad Fullmer
- Chick Fulmer
- Washington Fulmer
- Bill Fulton
- Aaron Fultz
- Dave Fultz
- Frank Funk
- Liz Funk
- Tom Funk
- Rafael Furcal
- Carl Furillo
- J. J. Furmaniak
- Eddie Fusselback
- Chris Fussell
- Mike Fyhrie
