= Zeider =

Zeider is a surname. Notable people with the surname include:

- Abi Zeider (1920–1999), Estonian trumpeter
- Rollie Zeider (1883–1967), American baseball player
