= James A. Gilmore =

American baseball executive (1876–1947)

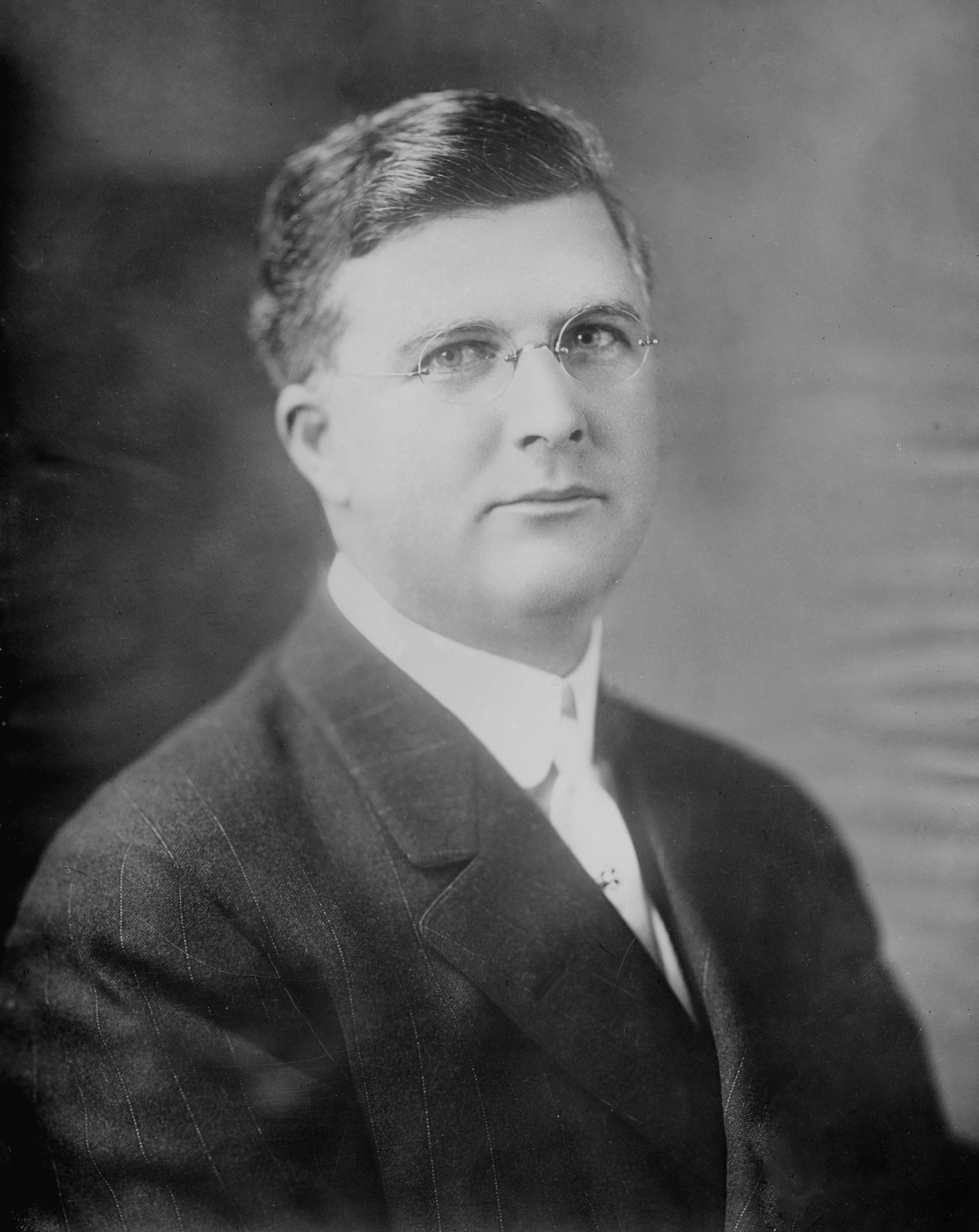
- Gilmore in 1914
- Born: March 2, 1876; Portsmouth, Ohio, U.S.
- Died: March 19, 1947 (aged 71); Waukegan, Illinois, U.S.
- Known for: President of the Federal League
- Military career
- Branch: United States Army
- Service years: 1898–1902, 1918
- Rank: Sergeant
- Conflicts: Spanish–American War; Philippine–American War; World War I

James Alexander Gilmore (March 2, 1876 – March 19, 1947) was an American businessman who served as president of baseball's Federal League when it attempted to become a third major league, alongside the American League and National League, in 1914 and 1915.

== Early life and career ==
James Alexander Gilmore was born on March 2, 1876, in Portsmouth, Ohio. He had three brothers and one sister. In 1882, the Gilmores moved briefly to St. Louis, Missouri, and then to Chicago, Illinois, for his father's job with Carson Pirie Scott & Co. Gilmore attended school on Chicago's West Side, and played sandlot baseball. He also played as a semi-professional.

Gilmore worked as a messenger for Armour and Company after he graduated, earning $3 a week. He demanded a raise to $4 per week, which was not met. He joined his brother at a coal company for $7 a week. When the Spanish–American War began, he enlisted in the United States Army, and was deployed to Cuba in the 1st Infantry Regiment. He developed a fever and lost 70 pounds (32 kg) in 46 days, and took 13 months to recover. He volunteered for service in the Philippine–American War, and went to the Philippines with the 43rd Infantry Division. He was commissioned a sergeant in 1900. He served in the Philippines for 22 months.

After returning from the war, Gilmore worked as a coal salesman. He worked for different companies and in different roles, working his way up to president of a manufacturing company in 1910.

== Baseball career ==
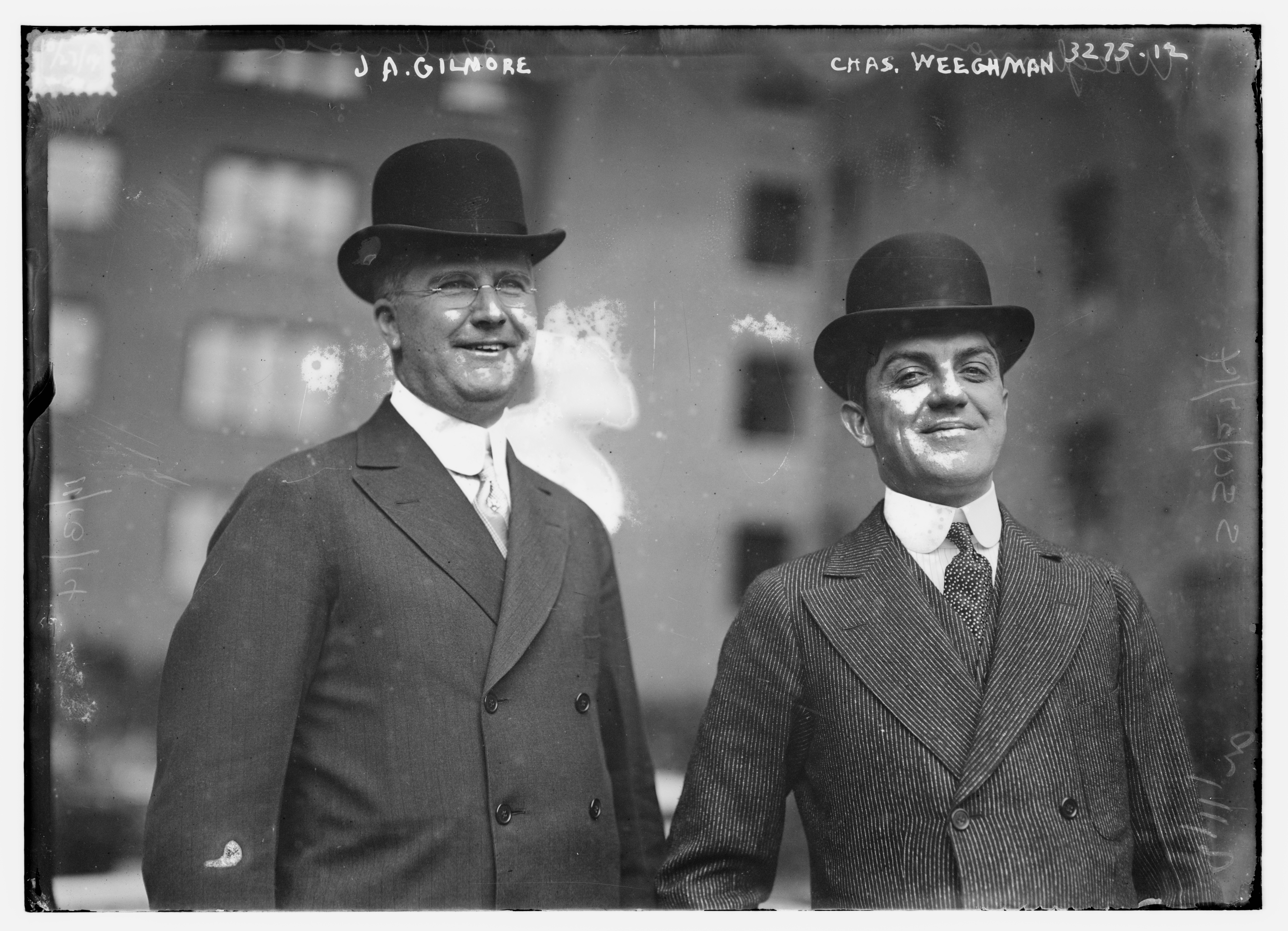
Gilmore (left) with Charles Weeghman (right)

In 1913, Gilmore played a round of golf with friend Eugene Pike and E.C. Racey, both of whom were investors in the Chicago Whales of the Federal League, an outlaw minor league that did not adhere to the national agreement of Organized Baseball. He became an investor in the team, joining with friends to invest $12,000 ($390,909 in current dollar terms), through which he took control of the team. In August 1913, Gilmore became acting president of the Federal League. He was elected president at the league meeting in November.

By the end of the 1913 season, most Federal League teams were approaching bankruptcy. Gilmore thought that there was a need for a third major league, in addition to the American League and National League. After the 1913 season, Gilmore convinced wealthy magnates to become team owners, including luring Charles Weeghman to take ownership of the Chicago franchise. From there, Gilmore reorganized the league, expanding it from six to eight teams. The Federal League lured Joe Tinker in December 1913, and continued to raid players from the National and American leagues. Gilmore spent the 1914 season traveling the country to promote the league, pitching it as a major league where the teams would be more balanced than in the American and National leagues. During the Federal League's annual meeting after the 1914 season, Gilmore was re-elected president to a five year term.

Team owners had lost money in the 1914 season and continued to lose money in 1915. After the 1915 season, the Federal League owners entered into negotiations with the other major leagues and agreed to fold the Federal League for $700,000 ($22,277,961 in current dollar terms).

== Later career ==
Gilmore enlisted in the Army in October 1918 and served with the Motor Transport Corps in World War I. After the war, he lived in New York City and worked as a stockbroker. He managed a brokerage firm in New York until he retired in the 1930s.

== Personal life ==
Gilmore was married to Genevieve Williams, a widow, in 1911. Williams had a daughter from her previous marriage, and she and Gilmore did not have children. They divorced in 1916. On February 14, 1925, Gilmore married Electra Waggoner. They annulled the marriage in September.

Gilmore was hospitalized in December 1945 following a long illness. His recovery was complicated by a stroke and pneumonia. He died at Downey Veteran Administration Hospital on March 19, 1947.
