= Tom McGuire (baseball) =

American baseball player (1892–1959)

- Pitcher
- Born: February 1, 1892; Chicago, Illinois, US
- Died: December 7, 1959 (aged 67); Phoenix, Arizona, US
- Batted: Right Threw: Right

MLB debut
- April 18, 1914, for the Chicago Federals

Last MLB appearance
- August 9, 1919, for the Chicago White Sox

MLB statistics
- Win–loss record: 5-6
- Earned run average: 3.82
- Strikeouts: 37
- Stats at Baseball Reference

Teams
- Chicago Federals (1914); Chicago White Sox (1919)

McGuire's grave at Holy Sepulchre Cemetery in Alsip, Illinois

Thomas Patrick McGuire (February 1, 1892 – December 7, 1959) was a pitcher in Major League Baseball. He played for four different professional teams in Chicago from 1912 to 1919.
