= Austin Walsh (baseball) =

American baseball player (1891–1955)

- Outfielder
- Born: September 1, 1891; Cambridge, Massachusetts, US
- Died: January 26, 1955 (aged 63); Glendale, California, US
- Batted: Left Threw: Left

MLB debut
- April 19, 1914, for the Chicago Federals

Last MLB appearance
- October 8, 1914, for the Chicago Federals

MLB statistics
- Batting average: .240
- Home runs: 1
- RBI: 10
- Stats at Baseball Reference

Teams
- Chicago Federals (1914)

Austin Edward Walsh (September 1, 1891 – January 26, 1955) was an American left fielder for the Chicago Federals professional baseball team in 1914.
