= Abi Zeider =

Jewish-Estonian musician

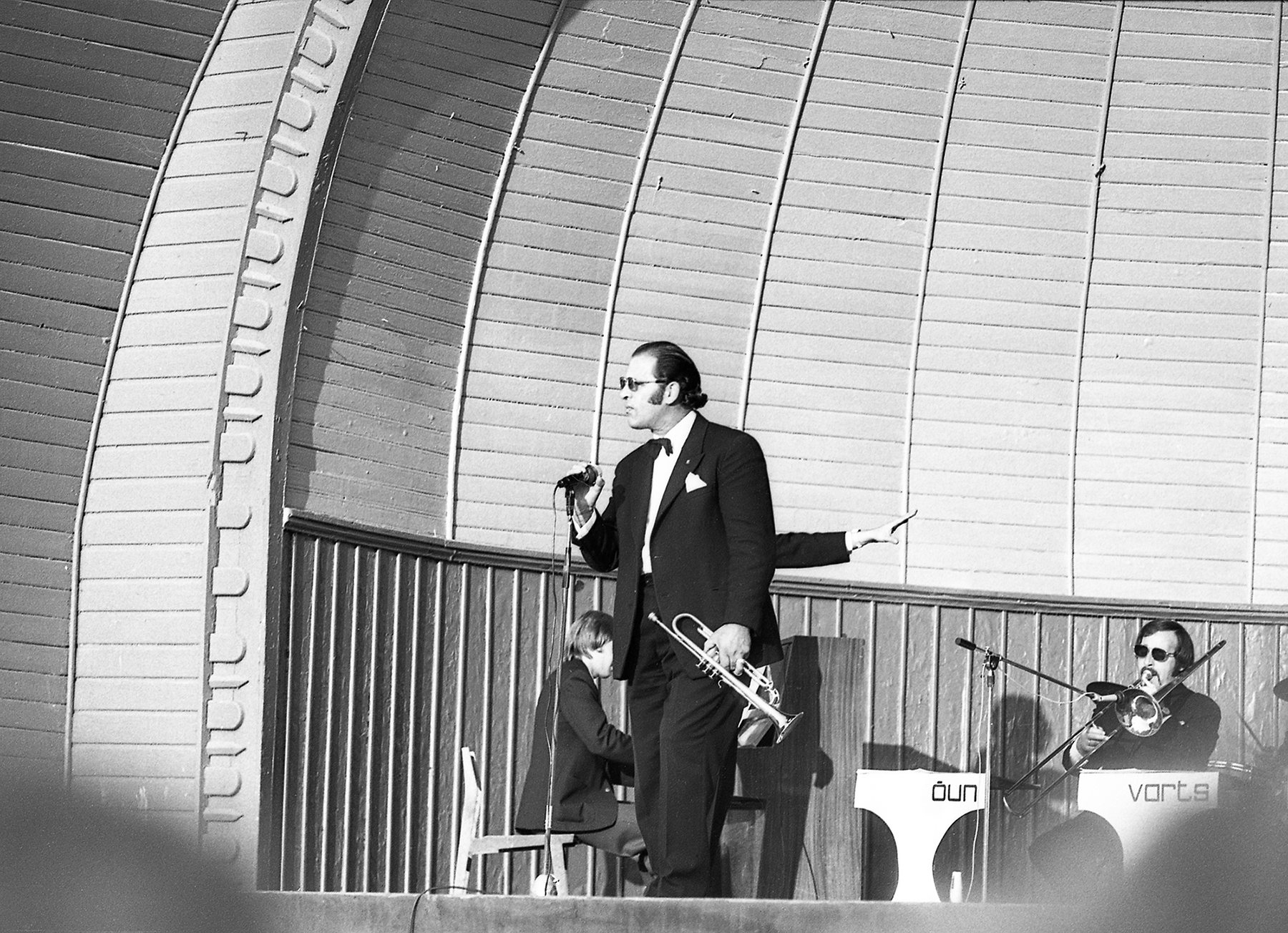

Background information
- Born: August 31, 1920; Valga, Estonia
- Died: March 12, 1999 (aged 78) Tallinn, Estonia
- Occupation: Trumpeter

Abi Zeider (31 August 1920 – 12 March 1999) was a Jewish-Estonian musician, trumpeter.

Zeider was born in Valga. He was mostly an autodidact. 1946-1952 he took private classes from J. Vaks and N. Kubli. During World War II he played at 8th Estonian Rifle Corps' orchestra. 1946-1957 he played at several orchestras in Tallinn. 1957-1980 he was the concert master of Estonian Television and Radio estrade orchestra. He played/acted also on several films, e.g. "Valge laev" (1970). Zeider died in Tallinn.

Awards:

- 1967: Estonian SSR Merited Artist
