= Leo Kavanagh =

American baseball player (1894-1950)

Leo Kavanaugh
- Shortstop
- Born: August 9, 1894; Chicago, Illinois, US
- Died: August 10, 1950 (aged 56); Chicago, Illinois, US
- Batted: Right Threw: right

MLB debut
- April 22, 1914, for the Chicago Federals

Last MLB appearance
- May 2, 1914, for the Chicago Federals

MLB statistics
- Batting average: .273
- Home runs: 0
- RBI: 1
- Stats at Baseball Reference

Teams
- Chicago Federals (1914)

Leo Daniel Kavanagh (August 9, 1894 in Chicago, Illinois – August 10, 1950 in Chicago, Illinois) was a shortstop for the Chicago Federals professional baseball team in 1914.
