= Charlie Pechous =

American baseball player (1896–1980)

- Third baseman
- Born: October 5, 1896; Chicago, Illinois, U.S.
- Died: September 13, 1980 (aged 83); Kenosha, Wisconsin, U.S.
- Batted: Right Threw: Right

MLB debut
- September 14, 1915, for the Chicago Whales

Last MLB appearance
- September 30, 1917, for the Chicago Cubs

MLB statistics
- Batting average: .180
- Home runs: 0
- Runs batted in: 9
- Stats at Baseball Reference

Teams
- Chicago Whales (1915); Chicago Cubs (1916–1917)

Charles Edward Pechous (October 5, 1896 in Chicago, Illinois – September 13, 1980 in Kenosha, Wisconsin) was a third baseman in Major League Baseball.
