= Erv Lange =

American baseball player (1887-1971)

- Pitcher
- Born: August 12, 1887; Forest Park, Illinois, US
- Died: April 24, 1971 (aged 83); Maywood, Illinois, US
- Batted: Right Threw: Right

MLB debut
- April 19, 1914, for the Chicago Whales

Last MLB appearance
- October 6, 1914, for the Chicago Whales

MLB statistics
- Win–loss record: 12–11
- Strikeouts: 87
- Earned run average: 2.23
- Stats at Baseball Reference

Teams
- Chicago Whales (1914)

Erwin Henry "Erv" Lange (August 12, 1887 – April 24, 1971) was a pitcher for the Chicago Whales professional baseball team in 1914.
