= Fred Beck =

American baseball player (1886–1962)

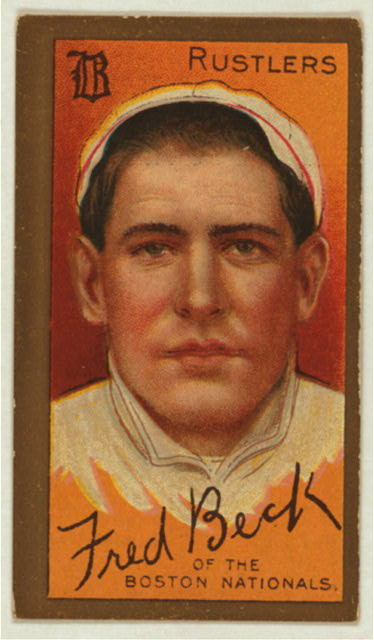
- First baseman / Outfielder
- Born: November 17, 1886; Havana, Illinois, U.S.
- Died: March 12, 1962 (aged 75); Havana, Illinois, U.S.
- Batted: Left Threw: Left

MLB debut
- April 14, 1909, for the Boston Doves

Last MLB appearance
- October 3, 1915, for the Chicago Whales

MLB statistics
- Batting average: .252
- Home runs: 33
- Runs batted in: 251
- Stats at Baseball Reference

Teams
- Boston Doves (1909–1910); Cincinnati Reds (1911); Philadelphia Phillies (1911); Chicago Chi-Feds/Whales (1914–1915)

Career highlights and awards
- NL home run leader (1910)

Frederick Thomas Beck (November 17, 1886 – March 12, 1962) was an American professional baseball player in the major leagues from 1909 to 1911 with the Boston Doves, Cincinnati Reds, and Philadelphia Phillies. In 1914 and 1915, he played for the Chicago Whales of the Federal League. In one season (1910), Beck tied two other players for the league lead in home runs. Beck played minor-league baseball for many years, missing one season due to service in World War I. He retired from professional baseball after the 1926 season.

== Biography ==
Born and raised in Havana, Illinois, Beck got his start in organized baseball with semi-pro teams in Havana. He began his professional career with Bloomington of the Illinois–Indiana–Iowa League in 1905. The team planned to use Beck as a pitcher, but he had problems throwing strikes, so he was placed in the outfield. He played with Bloomington until mid-1908, when he was sold to the San Francisco Seals of the Pacific Coast League for $750.

Beck made his major-league debut with the Boston Doves in 1909. In 1910, he tied for the major league lead in home runs with 10. He split 1911 between the Cincinnati Reds and Philadelphia Phillies and spent 1912 and 1913 with the Buffalo Bisons of the International League.

In late 1913, Beck was elected to the board of directors of a players union known as the Baseball Players' Fraternity. Beck was elected in the first year that International League players were allowed representation on the board. Before the season started, he signed on to the Federal League's Chicago Whales. As Beck had just hit .240 for Buffalo in 1913, Whales manager Joe Tinker predicted a difficult battle for first base between Beck and Bill Jackson, but Beck was the regular first baseman, playing 157 games for the Whales in 1914 and 110 games in 1915. He returned to the minor leagues for 1916 and 1917.

Beck was called into military service during World War I in 1918. He returned to the minor leagues as a player between 1919 and 1926, becoming a player-manager for the 1926 season with the Cedar Rapids Bunnies.

Late in his life, Beck was a clerk at the Taylor House Hotel in his native Havana. He died of a cerebral hemorrhage at Mason District Hospital in Havana in 1962 after being in the hospital for a month. He was interred at Laurel Hills Cemetery in the same city.

== See also ==
- List of Major League Baseball annual home run leaders
