= Dan Sherman =

American baseball player (1890-1955)

Dave Sherman
- Pitcher
- Born: November 26, 1890; Hubbardsville, New York, U.S.
- Died: September 16, 1955 (aged 64); Highland Park, Michigan, U.S.
- Batted: Right Threw: Right

MLB debut
- June 4, 1914, for the Chicago Federals

Last MLB appearance
- June 4, 1914, for the Chicago Federals

MLB statistics
- Win–loss record: 0–1
- Earned run average: 0.00
- Strikeouts: 0
- Stats at Baseball Reference

Teams
- Chicago Federals (1914)

Lester Daniel Sherman (May 9, 1890 in Hubbardsville, New York – September 16, 1955 in Highland Park, Michigan), nicknamed "Babe", was an American pitcher for the Chicago Federals professional baseball team in 1914.
