= George McConnell (baseball) =

American baseball player (1877–1964)

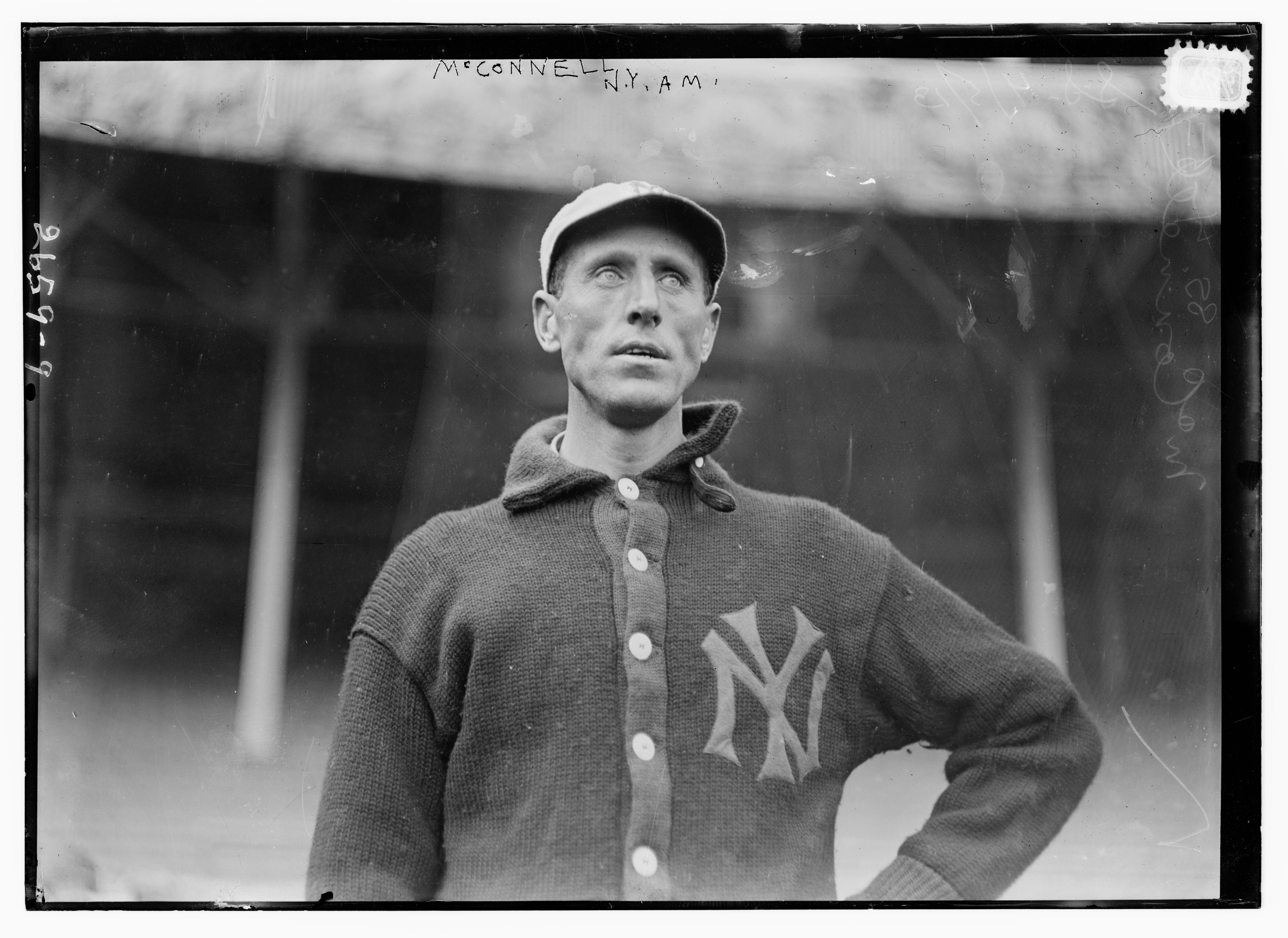
- Pitcher
- Born: September 16, 1877; Shelbyville, Tennessee, U.S.
- Died: May 10, 1964 (aged 86); Chattanooga, Tennessee, U.S.
- Batted: Right Threw: Right

MLB debut
- April 13, 1909, for the New York Highlanders

Last MLB appearance
- September 26, 1916, for the Chicago Cubs

MLB statistics
- Win–loss record: 41–51
- Earned run average: 2.60
- Strikeouts: 403
- Stats at Baseball Reference

Teams
- New York Highlanders / Yankees (1909, 1912–1913); Chicago Cubs (1914); Chicago Whales (1915); Chicago Cubs (1916)

George Neely "Slats" McConnell (September 16, 1877 – May 10, 1964) was an American pitcher in Major League Baseball. He played for the New York Highlanders/Yankees, Chicago Cubs, and Chicago Whales. His key pitch was the spitball.

He was born and raised in Bedford, Tennessee, the son of Neely S McConnell and Martha Jane Morton, married Elizabeth Pokorney (born 1895 in Illinois) and lived in Chattanooga, Tennessee. They had three children, 1 boy and 2 girls, although Elizabeth's age would imply that the first child (born about 1909) may have been from an earlier marriage. George McConnell is buried in Forest Hills Cemetery, Chattanooga.
