= Joe Weiss =

American baseball player (1894-1967)

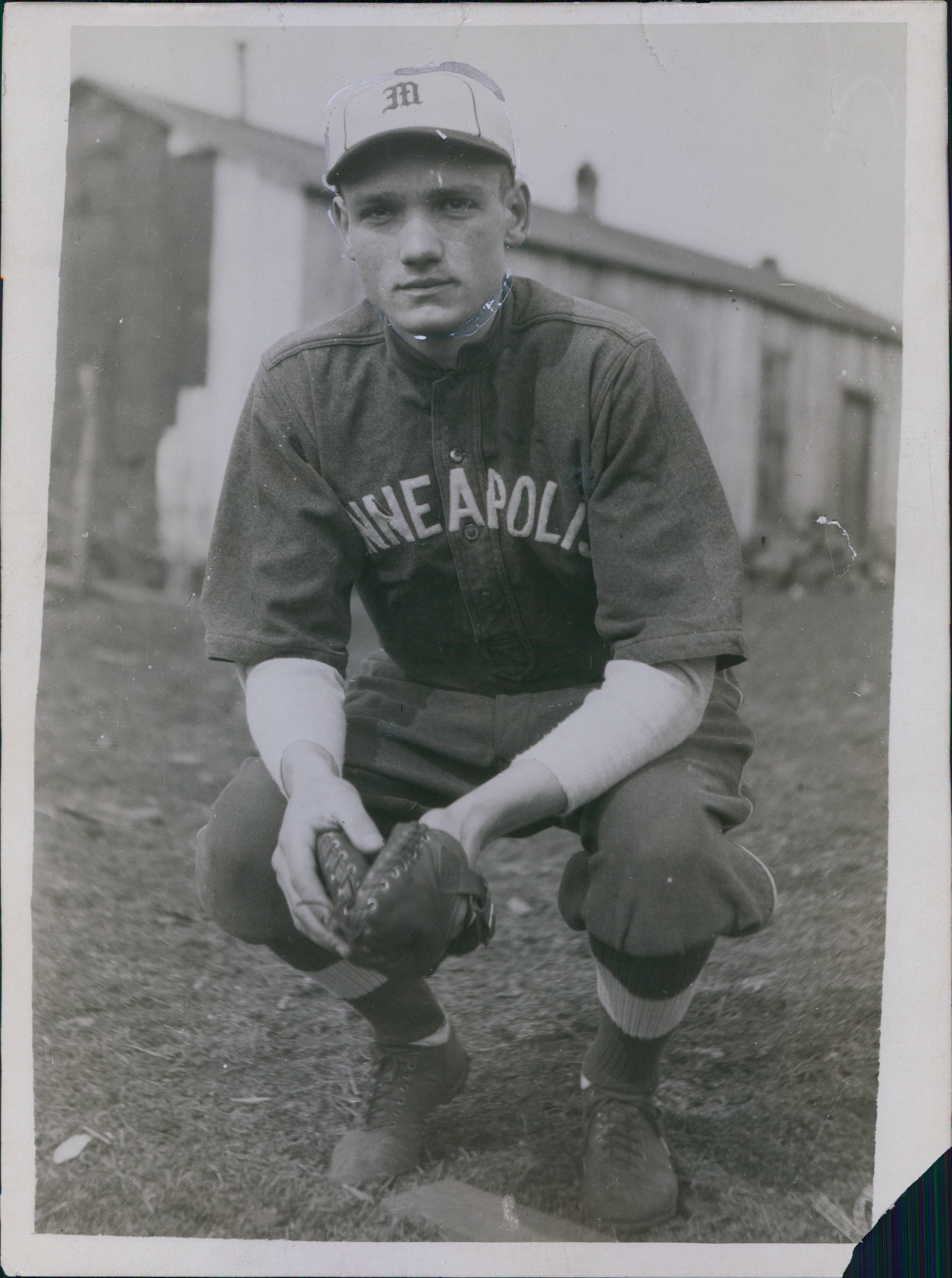
- First baseman
- Born: January 27, 1894; Chicago, Illinois
- Died: July 7, 1967 (aged 73); Cedar Rapids, Iowa
- Batted: Right Threw: Right

MLB debut
- August 29, 1915, for the Chicago Whales

Last MLB appearance
- October 3, 1915, for the Chicago Whales

MLB statistics
- Batting average: .224
- Home runs: 0
- Runs batted in: 11
- Stats at Baseball Reference

Teams
- Chicago Whales (1915)

Joseph Harold Weiss (January 27, 1894 in Chicago, Illinois – July 7, 1967 in Cedar Rapids, Iowa) was a first baseman for the Chicago Whales professional baseball team in 1915.
