= Hans Rasmussen (baseball) =

American baseball player (1895–1949)

- Pitcher
- Born: April 18, 1895; Chicago, Illinois
- Died: January 1, 1949 (aged 53); Chicago, Illinois
- Batted: Right Threw: Right

MLB debut
- August 11, 1915, for the Chicago Whales

Last MLB appearance
- August 13, 1915, for the Chicago Whales

MLB statistics
- Win–loss record: 0–0
- Earned run average: 13.50
- Strikeouts: 2
- Stats at Baseball Reference

Teams
- Chicago Whales (1915)

Henry Florian Rasmussen (April 18, 1895 – January 1, 1949) was a pitcher for the Chicago Whales professional baseball team in 1915. In two relief appearances, he allowed 3 runs in 2 innings for a 13.50 earned run average.
