= Tex Wisterzil =

American baseball player

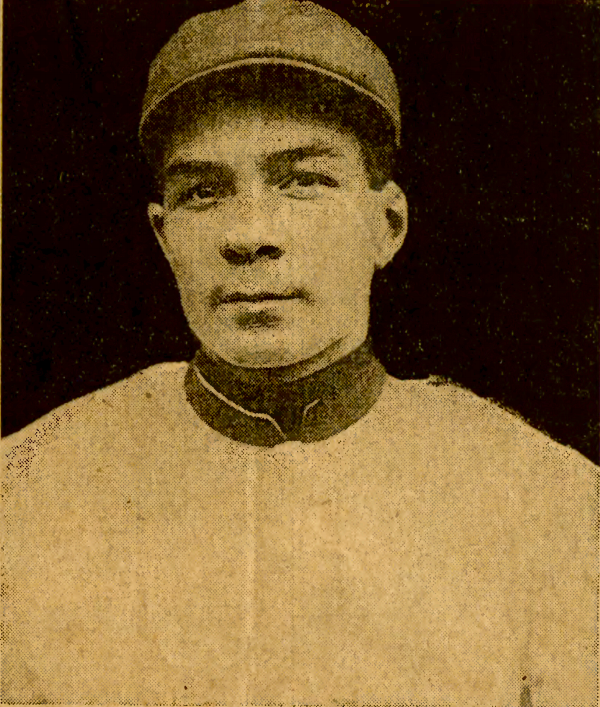
- Wisterzil in 1915
- Third baseman
- Born: March 7, 1888; Detroit, Michigan, U.S.
- Died: June 27, 1964 (aged 76); San Antonio, Texas, U.S.
- Batted: Right Threw: Right

MLB debut
- April 14, 1914, for the Brooklyn Tip-Tops

Last MLB appearance
- October 2, 1915, for the Chicago Whales

MLB statistics
- Batting average: .260
- Home runs: 0
- RBI: 105
- Stats at Baseball Reference

Teams
- Brooklyn Tip-Tops (1914–15); Chicago Whales (1915); St. Louis Terriers (1915); Chicago Whales (1915)

George John "Tex" Wisterzil (March 7, 1888 – June 27, 1964) was an American professional baseball player. He played two seasons in Major League Baseball in 1914 and 1915, primarily as a third baseman. He played for the Brooklyn Tip-Tops, Chicago Whales and St. Louis Terriers in the short-lived Federal League. He also had an extensive career in minor league baseball, spanning twenty seasons from 1908 to 1927.

== Sources ==
- Career statistics from Baseball Reference · Baseball Reference (Minors) · Retrosheet · Baseball Almanac
