= Jack Kading =

American baseball player (1884–1964)

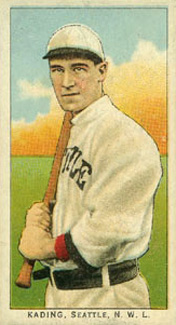
- First baseman
- Born: November 27, 1884; Waukesha, Wisconsin, U.S.
- Died: June 2, 1964 (aged 79); Chicago, Illinois, U.S.
- Batted: Right Threw: Right

MLB debut
- September 12, 1910, for the Pittsburgh Pirates

Last MLB appearance
- May 2, 1914, for the Chicago Chi-Feds

MLB statistics
- Batting average: .269
- Home runs: 0
- Runs batted in: 4
- Stats at Baseball Reference

Teams
- Pittsburgh Pirates (1910); Chicago Chi-Feds (1914)

John Frederick Kading (November 17, 1884 – June 2, 1964) was an American first baseman in Major League Baseball.
