= Bruno Block =

American baseball player (1885–1937)

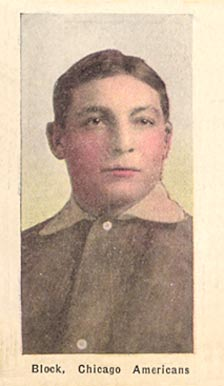
- Catcher
- Born: March 13, 1885; Wisconsin Rapids, Wisconsin, U.S.
- Died: August 6, 1937 (aged 52); South Milwaukee, Wisconsin, U.S.
- Batted: Right Threw: Right

MLB debut
- August 5, 1907, for the Washington Senators

Last MLB appearance
- October 4, 1914, for the Chicago Chi-Feds

MLB statistics
- Batting average: .231
- Home runs: 1
- Runs batted in: 69
- Stats at Baseball Reference

Teams
- Washington Senators (1907); Chicago White Sox (1910–1912); Chicago Chi-Feds (1914)

Career highlights and awards
- Caught Ed Walsh's no-hitter August 27, 1911

James "Jimmy" John Block (born James John Blochowicz on March 13, 1885 – August 6, 1937) was an American catcher over parts of five seasons in Major League Baseball. He was known during his playing days as Jimmy Block. He reported to the Washington Senators the same day that Walter Johnson made his major league debut. Jimmy Block caught "Big" Ed Walsh's no-hitter on August 27, 1911. He married Maria Czaplewski of Milwaukee with the marriage license filing date of October 6, 1910. After his baseball career ended, he became a salesman for the Miller Brewing Company.
