= Dave Black (baseball) =

American baseball player (1892–1936)

- Pitcher
- Born: November 8, 1893; Chicago, Illinois, U.S.
- Died: June 17, 1959 (aged 65); Chicago, Illinois, U.S.
- Batted: Left Threw: Right

MLB debut
- May 2, 1914, for the Chicago Federals

Last MLB appearance
- May 10, 1923, for the Boston Red Sox

MLB statistics
- Win–loss record: 8–10
- Earned run average: 3.18
- Strikeouts: 72
- Stats at Baseball Reference

Teams
- Chicago Federals/Whales (1914–1915); Baltimore Terrapins (1915); Boston Red Sox (1923)

David Black (November 8, 1893 – June 17, 1959) was an American pitcher in Major League Baseball who played in the Federal League from 1914 through 1915 for the Chicago Whales (1914–1915) and Baltimore Terrapins (1915) and with the Boston Red Sox of the American League in 1923. Black batted left-handed and threw right-handed. He was born in Chicago, Illinois.

In a three-season career, Black posted an 8–10 record with 72 strikeouts and a 3.18 earned run average in 181 1/3 innings pitched.

In the field, he handled 69 total chances without an error for a perfect 1.000 fielding percentage
