= Rankin Johnson Sr. =

American baseball player (1888–1972)

Rankin Johnson
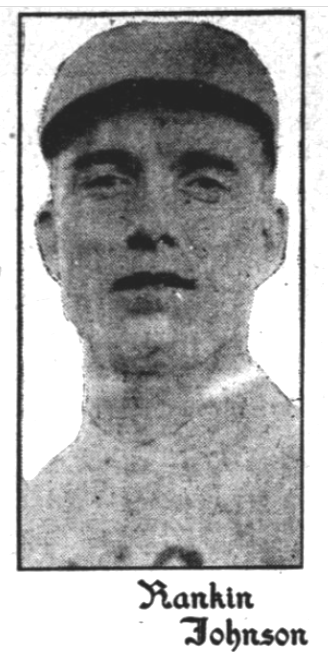
- Pitcher
- Born: February 4, 1888; Burnet, Texas, U.S.
- Died: July 2, 1972 (aged 84); Williamsport, Pennsylvania, U.S.
- Batted: Right Threw: Right

MLB debut
- April 20, 1914, for the Boston Red Sox

Last MLB appearance
- July 16, 1918, for the St. Louis Cardinals

MLB statistics
- Win–loss record: 22–30
- Earned run average: 2.92
- Strikeouts: 169
- Stats at Baseball Reference

Teams
- Boston Red Sox (1914); Chi-Feds/Whales (1914–1915); Baltimore Terrapins (1915); St. Louis Cardinals (1918)

Adam Rankin "Tex" Johnson Sr. (February 4, 1888 – July 2, 1972) was an American pitcher in Major League Baseball. His son, Rankin Johnson, Jr., was also a Major League pitcher. His grandfather was the Civil War military leader Stovepipe Johnson.

He began his professional career with the Austin Senators of the Texas League in 1908. His best season pitching was in 1916 with the Fort Worth Panthers of the Texas League. His record was 15–12 in 35 appearances that year. Later in his minor league career he was a player/coach for four seasons (1923–1926). His last professional season was in 1926 for the Chambersburg Maroons of the Blue Ridge League.
