= Claude Hendrix =

American baseball player (1889–1944)

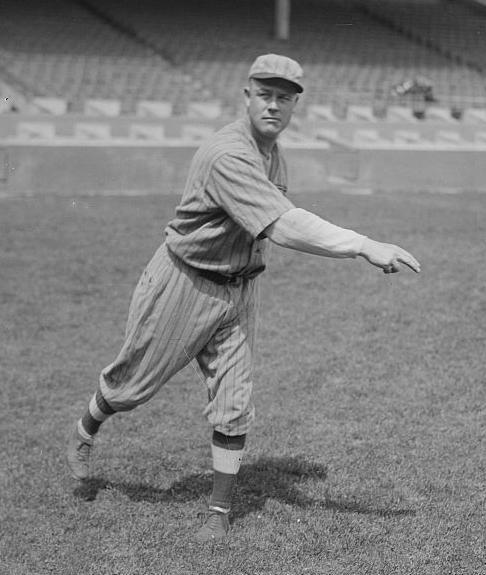
- Pitcher
- Born: April 13, 1889; Olathe, Kansas, U.S.
- Died: March 22, 1944 (aged 54); Allentown, Pennsylvania, U.S.
- Batted: Right Threw: Right

MLB debut
- June 11, 1911, for the Pittsburgh Pirates

Last MLB appearance
- August 27, 1920, for the Chicago Cubs

MLB statistics
- Win–loss record: 144–116
- Earned run average: 2.65
- Strikeouts: 697
- Stats at Baseball Reference

Teams
- Pittsburgh Pirates (1911–1913); Chicago Chi-Feds/Whales (1914–1915); Chicago Cubs (1916–1920)

Career highlights and awards
- Federal League champion (1915); Federal League ERA champion (1914); Federal League wins champion (1914)

Claude Raymond Hendrix (April 13, 1889 – March 22, 1944) was an American professional baseball pitcher who played in the National League for the Pittsburgh Pirates (1911–13) and Chicago Cubs (1916–20) and in the Federal League with the Chicago Whales (1914–15). He pitched a no-hitter in 1915 and was the first pitcher to record a victory at Wrigley Field, then named Weeghman Park. In 1921, he was accused of tipping off a gambler to a possibly fixed game in 1920; an allegation that, while not proven, likely ended his career in baseball.

== Biography ==
Hendrix was born in Olathe, Kansas. His father was a banker who had also served as the Johnson County sheriff. In 1908, he attended and played baseball for Fairmount College, the predecessor to Wichita State University. After college, he played for Lincoln in the Western League. In 1909, he played for the Salina Trade Winners of the Central Kansas League. He had a good season in 1910 with an independent minor league team in Cheyenne, Wyoming, with a record of 17 wins and four losses with 208 strikeouts.

The season earned him a contract with the Pittsburgh Pirates for 1911. His second season in Pittsburgh was a breakout year where Hendrix, a spitballer, went 24-9 with a 2.59 earned run average. As a 23-year old player, he was second in strikeouts, behind only Grover Cleveland Alexander and received a few votes for Most Valuable Player. In 1913, his win–loss record was only 14-15, but he had a good ERA of 2.84 with 138 strikeouts.

In 1914, Hendrix sought an increase in his salary to $7,500 per season. After manager Fred Clarke offered him a contract with a lesser increase, Hendrix failed to provide Pittsburgh with an answer and owner Barney Dreyfuss rescinded the contract and offered him one with no increase instead. He instead signed with the Chicago Whales of the new Federal League. On April 23, 1914, Hendrix pitched in the first game at Wrigley Field, now Wrigley Field and became the first pitcher to record a win in the stadium with a five-hitter against the Kansas City Packers. That season, he went 29-10 for Chicago, leading the league in wins, ERA and complete games. On May 15, 1915, Hendrix pitched a no-hitter against the Pittsburgh Rebels, allowing only three batters to reach base on walks. However, his 1915 campaign was more pedestrian with only 16 victories and a 3.00 ERA. Still, the Chi-Feds captured the Federal League pennant in 1915.

In 1916, Hendrix signed a contract with the Chicago Cubs in the wake of the Federal League's collapse. Hendrix started the first game for the Cubs at Wrigley Field, which Chicago won 7-6 in 11 innings. His first two seasons in Chicago, he posted ERA of 2.68 and 2.60 but had a record of 18-28 as the Cubs struggled.

In 1918, the team and Hendrix had a resurgence. Hendrix went 20-7 with a 2.78 ERA and the Cubs won the National League Pennant. Hendrix helped clinch the league title on August 24 winning the first game of a doubleheader against the Brooklyn Robins. Hendrix did not start in the 1918 World Series against the Boston Red Sox, the first to feature Babe Ruth. The left-handed Ruth was notoriously tough on right-handed pitchers and the Cubs started only Hippo Vaughn and Lefty Tyler to try and hold Ruth in check. In his only appearance of the series, he singled off Ruth and then was replaced by Bill McCabe after reaching second.

After the season, Hendrix went to work at a shipyard in Superior, Wisconsin. The Secretary of War Newton D. Baker issued a "work-or-fight" order that required baseball players to work in essential industries during World War I for face the draft. Baker allowed the baseball season to continue until September, after which, players like Hendrix had to begin working toward the war effort.

Toward the end of the 1920 season, Hendrix, who had a record of 9-12 with a 3.58 ERA, was scheduled to start on August 31 against the Philadelphia Phillies, who were in last place. The Cubs were informed that money had been bet heavily against the Cubs in that game. The Cubs replaced Hendrix with Grover Cleveland Alexander who lost 3-0. With a grand jury investigating the Black Sox scandal in the 1919 World Series, the media paid great attention to rumors of potential game fixing. The Kansas City Times reported that $10,000 had been wagered on Philadelphia in the game. Immediately after the grand jury indicted the Black Sox, The New York Times reported that American League president Ban Johnson had obtained evidence against Hendrix regarding the Philadelphia game. A Kansas City sportswriter, Otto Floto, learned of a telegram sent to a local gambler named H. A. "Frock" Thompson (which was misprinted as "Frog" by The New York Times) saying "Bet $5,000 on opposition" and claimed to recall that Hendrix had sent the telegram. Hendrix did not testify before the grand jury, but told reporters that he had never met Thompson and Thompson stated that he did not know Hendrix.

On February 7, 1921, Hendrix received his release from the Cubs. The next day, Hendrix told reporters that he would no longer pitch in the majors, but would continue his career in semi-pro baseball back in the Midwest. Cubs owner Bill Veeck stated that Hendrix's release had nothing to do with the allegations but was moving away from older veterans. Later articles did indicate that Hendrix was forced out. Hendrix himself said that he had already planned to leave the Cubs after the 1920 season as he had a good job as a car salesman. later, Hendrix and his father purchased the Liberty Theater in Kansas City.

He continued to work in Kansas City until 1923 when his wife Mabel died. The following year, he moved to Pennsylvania, playing baseball in Emmaus. In 1924, Commissioner Kenesaw Mountain Landis communicated that Hendrix was free to play baseball after fans of other teams called him an "outlaw". He played for the Allentown Dukes with other former major leaguers.

Hendrix died on March 22, 1944, in Allentown, Pennsylvania, at the age of 54.

== See also ==
- List of Major League Baseball annual ERA leaders
- List of Major League Baseball no-hitters

Achievements
Preceded by Frank Allen	No-hitter pitcher May 15, 1915	Succeeded by Alex Main
