= Charles Weeghman =

German-American restaurant entrepreneur and sports executive

Charles Henry Weeghman
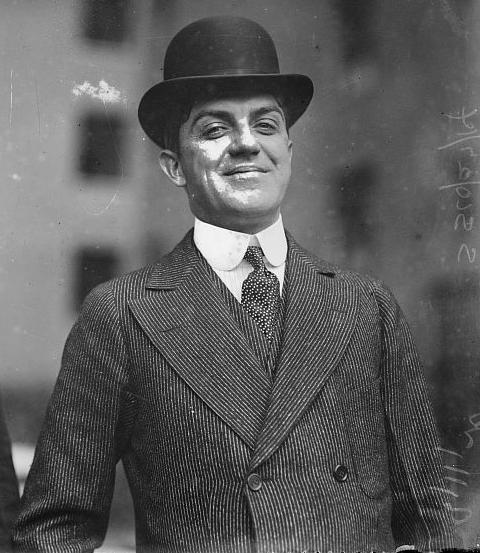
- Weeghman in 1914
- Born: March 8, 1874; Richmond, Indiana, U.S.
- Died: November 1, 1938 (aged 64); Chicago, Illinois, U.S.
- Other name: Lucky Charlie Weeghman
- Education: Richmond High School
- Occupations: Restaurateur, Owner of the Chicago Whales and Chicago Cubs

Charles Henry Weeghman (March 8, 1874 – November 1, 1938) was an American restaurant entrepreneur and sports executive. Beginning in 1901, he began opening quick-service lunch counters throughout downtown Chicago. After failing to acquire the St. Louis Cardinals baseball club in 1911, he became one of the founders of the upstart Federal League in 1913 as the owner of the Chicago Whales. In 1914, he built the baseball stadium that would later be known as Wrigley Field.

After the failure of the Federal League, Weeghman acquired a majority interest in the Chicago Cubs. After taking control of the Cubs, he moved the team to Weeghman Park as it was then known. His restaurant empire began to fail as he spent much of his time and money on baseball and while the country moved away from "one-arm" lunch counters. In 1919, he lost control of the Cubs to William Wrigley Jr., who renamed the stadium. His later business ventures were unsuccessful and in his final years he was the assistant manager of a restaurant in New Jersey.

== Biography ==
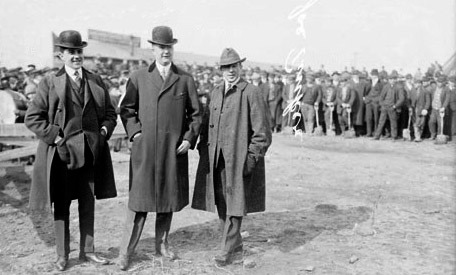
Weeghman (left) with James A. Gilmore (center) and Joe Tinker (right) at the groundbreaking ceremony for Weeghman Park, March 4, 1914

Weeghman was born on March 8, 1874, in Richmond, Indiana, (Note: His New York Times obituary uses March 12, 1874. His WWI draft registration in 1918 and his death certificate use March 8, 1874. Generally the document closest to the event is correct.) and attended Richmond High School.

Weeghman worked for Charles King as a waiter for $10 a week. King quickly promoted Weeghman who eventually open his own lunch counter in Chicago. King, who would have been Weeghman's main rival, died the day Weeghman's first restaurant opened. Serving only cold sandwiches, his diners would eat at one-armed school chairs so Weeghman could fit more chairs into the restaurant. In 1899 he married Bessie Webb who was a waitress in King's restaurant. At one point, Weeghman owned fifteen of these diners, with the one located at Madison and Dearborn serving 35,000 people each day.

In 1911, Weeghman made an unsuccessful attempt to purchase a controlling interest in the St. Louis Cardinals. Cardinals owner Helene Hathaway Britton had recently inherited the team upon the death of her uncle, Stanley Robison. She refused Weeghman's offer of $350,000 for the club, eventually selling the team to Sam Breadon in 1917.

By 1915 his net worth was estimated at $8,000,000 (approximately $255,000,000 today). With James A. Gilmore's persuasion, Weeghman took control of the Chicago Whales, and he built a new steel-and-concrete ballpark, Weeghman Park, for them to play in. He leased the land, the former site of the Theological Seminary of the Evangelical Lutheran Church, from Edward Archambault, for 99 years at a cost of $16,000 per year. Weeghman's lease forbade the use of the land for "immoral or illegal purposes." Weeghman chose the site in part because of the proximity to the 'L' tracks.

In 1915, the major league clubs settled with the Federal League opening the door for Weeghman to buy a team. He acquired an interest in the Chicago Cubs from Charles Phelps Taft in 1916, emerging as the older club's majority owner for $500,000 (approximately $15,000,000 today). He then moved the Cubs from the wooden West Side Park to Weeghman Park.

The Cubs board authorized up to $200,000 to acquire star players from other teams and Weeghman spent lavishly on them, paying $50,000 to buy the contracts of Grover Cleveland Alexander and Bill Killefer from the Philadelphia Phillies in 1917. He also offered $50,000 for Cardinals star Rogers Hornsby, angering Branch Rickey as Hornsby was holding out for a larger contract at the time. He reportedly considered making an offer to Brooklyn for Zach Wheat and tampered with Heinie Groh of Cincinnati.

Over time, his lunch counter chain lost favor with the public and Weeghman was forced to sell more and more of his stock in the Cubs to chewing gum magnate William Wrigley Jr. to raise money. In 1918, he stepped down as president of the Cubs and was succeeded by Fred Mitchell. By 1919, Weeghman had sold his remaining stake to Wrigley, and by 1920, was no longer a board member of the Cubs. The Wrigley family would control the Cubs for the next six decades before selling to the Tribune Company. This also led to the name change from Weeghman Park to Cubs Park, and later, Wrigley Field.

In 1920 he divorced Bessie Webb and was given custody of his daughter. On August 13, 1920, his restaurant chain was bankrupt and put into receivership. His brother Albert took over control of the restaurant chain. In October of that year, during the investigation of the Black Sox scandal Weeghman told reporters that he had been tipped off in August 1919 that the 1919 World Series would be fixed.

On August 16, 1921, Weeghman sponsored the first Illinois statewide rally of the Ku Klux Klan on his property in Lake Zurich, Illinois. The rally may have drawn more than 12,000 people and saw the initiation of more than 2,000 new Klan members.

Weeghman moved to Manhattan, New York City with his now 8-year-old daughter. He unsuccessfully tried to start over in the restaurant business. Baseball owners and former colleagues like Jacob Ruppert of the New York Yankees, Harry Frazee of the Boston Red Sox and Harry Ford Sinclair from the Federal League backed him in a New York restaurant that failed. His next two restaurant ventures in the 1930s both failed.

He died of a stroke at the Drake Hotel on November 1, 1938, in Chicago, Illinois. He was in transit from Hot Springs, Arkansas to his home in Manhattan, New York City. At the time of his death, he was the assistant manager of a restaurant in Fort Lee, New Jersey.

== Personal life ==
Weeghman met his first wife, Bessie Webb, when she worked at his first lunch room as a cashier. In 1913, they had a daughter, Dorothy. Weeghman's wife filed for divorce on February 27, 1920, claiming Weeghman had been intimate with at least one other woman. In 1922, two years after he divorced his first wife, Weeghman eloped to East St. Louis with Carol Osmund, who was 29 years old at the time of their wedding. Osmund and Weeghman remained married until he suffered a fatal stroke on November 1, 1938, at the Drake Hotel in Chicago.

== Footnotes ==
Preceded by Charles Phelps Taft	Owner of the Chicago Cubs; 1916–1918	Succeeded by William Wrigley Jr.
