= Clem Clemens =

American baseball player (1886–1967)

- Catcher/Second baseman
- Born: November 2, 1886; Chicago, Illinois, U.S.
- Died: November 2, 1967 (aged 81); St. Petersburg, Florida, U.S.
- Batted: Right Threw: Right

MLB debut
- May 15, 1914, for the Chicago Chi-Feds

Last MLB appearance
- September 18, 1916, for the Chicago Cubs

MLB statistics
- Games played: 34
- Batting average: .109
- Runs batted in: 5
- Stats at Baseball Reference

Teams
- Chicago Chi-Feds/Whales (1914–1915); Chicago Cubs (1916)

Clement Lambert "Count" Clemens (born Clement Lambert Ulatowski; November 21, 1886 – November 2, 1967) was a catcher in Major League Baseball from 1914 through 1916, playing for two Chicago-based teams. Listed at 5 feet 11 inches (1.80 m) and 176 pounds (80 kg), he both batted and threw right-handed.

After his playing career, Clemens was an attorney in Chicago and, by 1950, a farmer in Bass Lake, Indiana.
