= William Fischer (baseball) =

American baseball player (1891–1945)

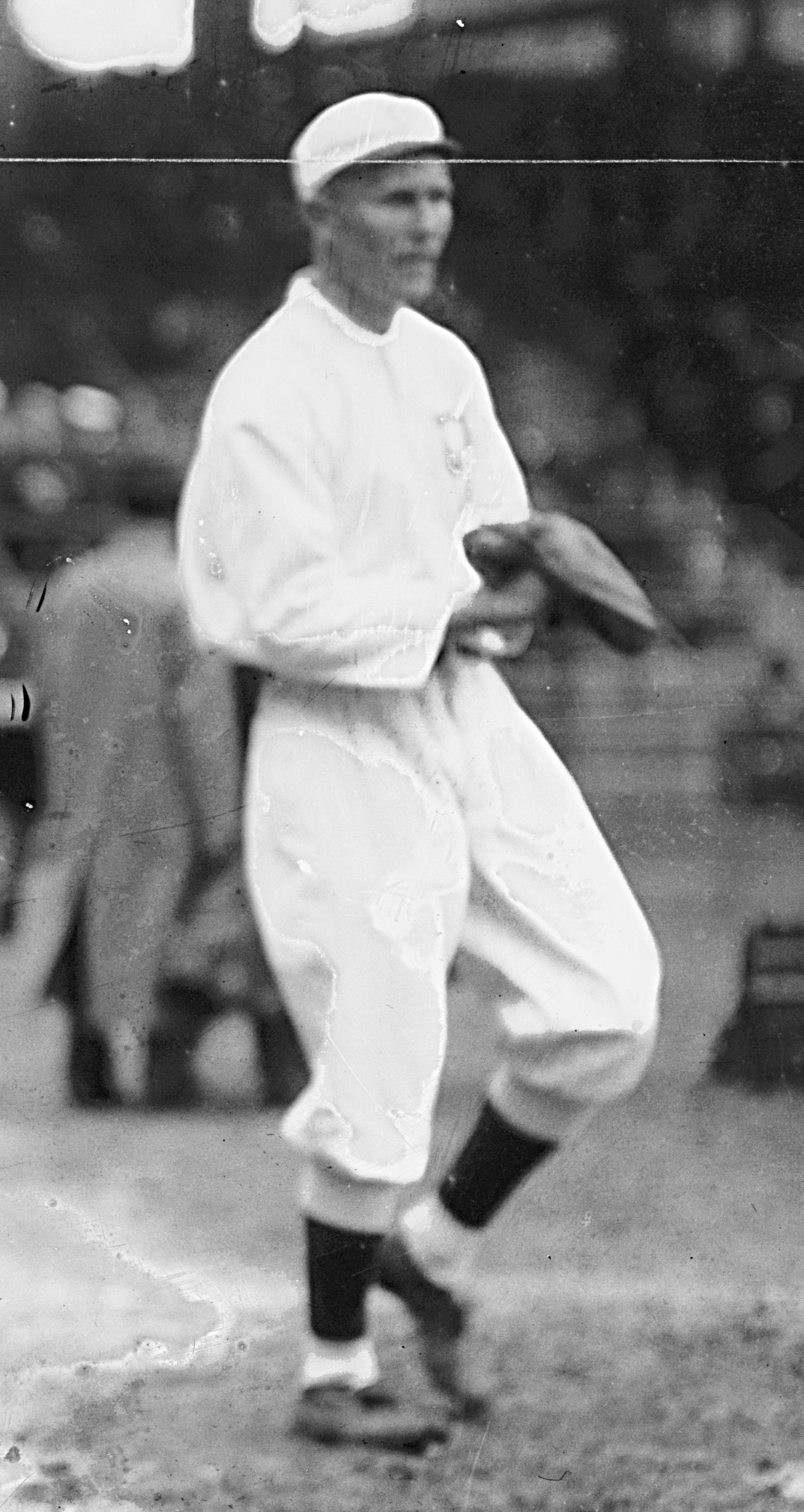
- Fischer with the Brooklyn Robins in 1914
- Catcher
- Born: March 2, 1891; New York, New York, U.S.
- Died: September 4, 1945 (aged 54); Richmond, Virginia, U.S.
- Batted: Left Threw: Right

MLB debut
- June 9, 1913, for the Brooklyn Dodgers

Last MLB appearance
- September 29, 1917, for the Pittsburgh Pirates

MLB statistics
- Batting average: .274
- Home runs: 10
- Runs batted in: 115
- Stats at Baseball Reference

Teams
- Brooklyn Dodgers / Robins (1913–1914); Chicago Whales (1915); Chicago Cubs (1916); Pittsburgh Pirates (1916–1917)

William Charles Fischer (March 2, 1891 – September 4, 1945) was an American catcher in Major League Baseball.

== Biography ==
Fischer was born in New York City. He started his professional baseball career in 1909. After the 1912 season, he was picked up by the Brooklyn Dodgers in the rule 5 draft and was their backup catcher in 1913 and 1914. In 1915, he jumped to the Chicago Whales of the Federal League.

Fischer had a career year in 1915, hitting .329 and finishing second in the batting race to Benny Kauff. The Whales won the pennant. However, the Federal League folded after the season, and Fischer was sent to the Chicago Cubs. He started off slow in 1916 and was traded to the Pittsburgh Pirates in July. He played in Pittsburgh for the next two years before his major league career ended.

Fischer died in Richmond, Virginia, in 1945.
