= Art Wilson =

American baseball player (1885–1960)

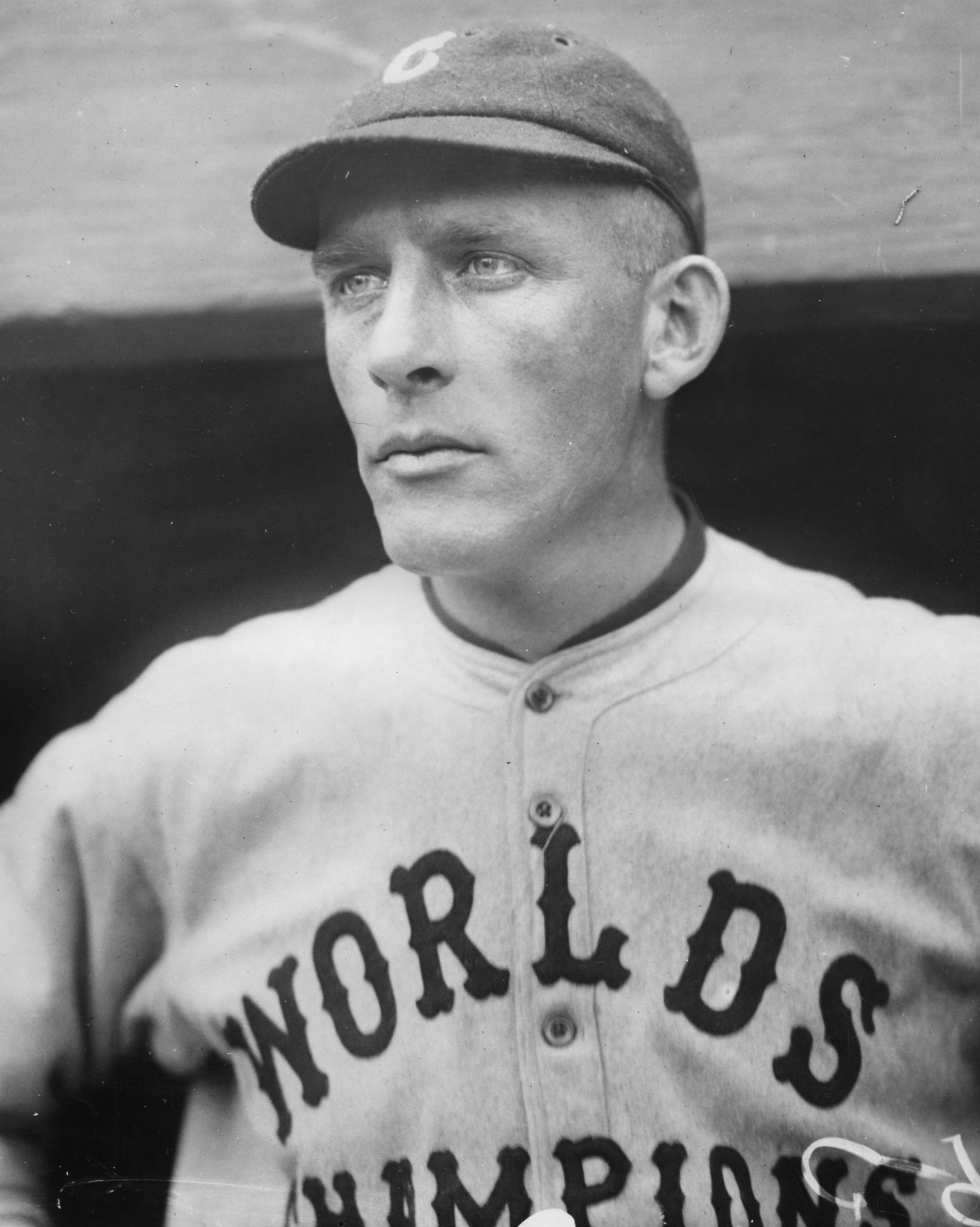
- Catcher
- Born: December 11, 1885; Macon, Illinois, U.S.
- Died: June 12, 1960 (aged 74); Chicago, Illinois, U.S.
- Batted: Right Threw: Right

MLB debut
- September 29, 1908, for the New York Giants

Last MLB appearance
- June 12, 1921, for the Cleveland Indians

MLB statistics
- Batting average: .261
- Home runs: 24
- Runs batted in: 227
- Stats at Baseball Reference

Teams
- New York Giants (1908–1913); Chicago Whales (1914–1915); Pittsburgh Pirates (1916); Chicago Cubs (1916–1917); Boston Braves (1918–1920); Cleveland Indians (1921)

Arthur Earl "Dutch" Wilson (December 11, 1885 – June 12, 1960) was an American professional baseball player. He played all or part of fourteen seasons in Major League Baseball, primarily as a catcher.

Wilson spent most of his career as a backup, although he was the starting catcher for the Federal League's Chicago Whales during their two-season tenure in 1914–1915. He hit the first home run in the history of Wrigley Field, off of George "Chief" Johnson on April 23, 1914. He was the catcher for Cubs pitcher Hippo Vaughn during the "double no-hitter" game in 1917. The Cubs lost the game when Larry Kopf singled, then went to third on an error by Cy Williams and scored on an infield hit by Jim Thorpe in the 10th inning.

In 812 games over 14 seasons, Wilson posted a .261 batting average (536-for-2056) with 237 runs, 24 home runs and 227 RBI. He finished his career with a .972 fielding percentage.

== Sources ==
- Shatzkin, Mike (1990). The Ballplayers. Arbor House. pp. 1184. ISBN 0-87795-984-6.
