= Harry Fritz (baseball) =

American baseball player (1890-1974)

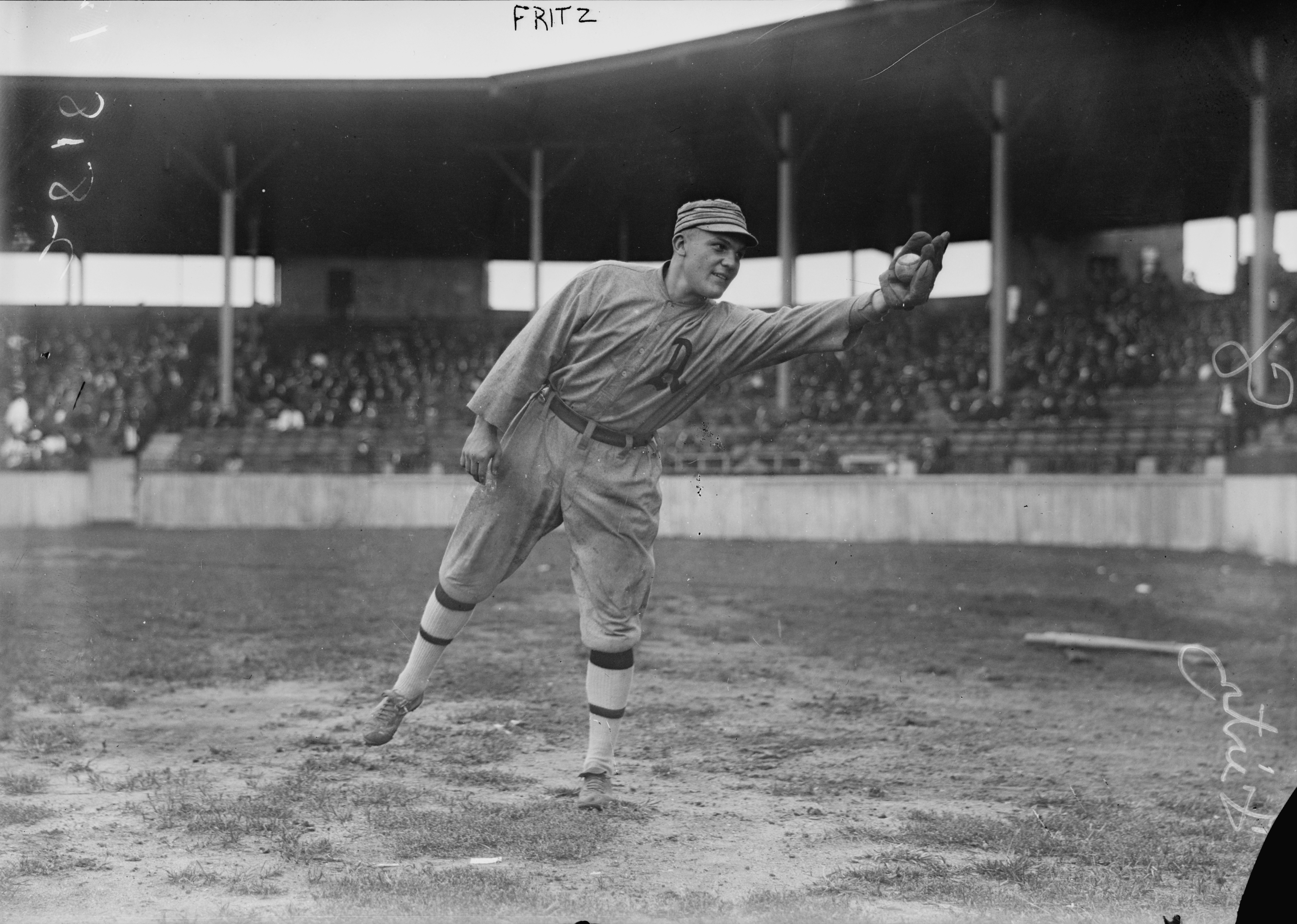
- Third baseman
- Born: September 30, 1890; Philadelphia, Pennsylvania, U.S.
- Died: November 4, 1974 (aged 84); Columbus, Ohio, U.S.
- Batted: Right Threw: Right

MLB debut
- September 29, 1913, for the Philadelphia Athletics

Last MLB appearance
- September 18, 1915, for the Chicago Whales

MLB statistics
- Batting Average: .227
- Runs Batted In: 39
- Hits: 96
- Stats at Baseball Reference

Teams
- Philadelphia Athletics (1913); Chicago Whales (1914–1915)

Harry Koch "Dutchman" Fritz (September 30, 1890 – November 4, 1974) was an American third baseman for Major League Baseball teams the Philadelphia Athletics and Chicago Whales.

== Biography ==
Fritz was born in Philadelphia, Pennsylvania on September 30, 1890. Fritz played three years in professional baseball, mostly in the Federal League. He played for Wilmington from 1911 to 1913 and also with the Athletics late in the season for five games for the 1913 World Series winning team. In 1914, he played 65 games for the Chicago Chi-Feds under manager Joe Tinker. While Rollie Zeider was the everyday third baseman, Fritz was the most utilized backup infielder on the second place team. He was the everyday third baseman for the 1915 Chicago Whales. He finished his career at Syracuse in 1916.

Fritz was married in Philadelphia on January 27, 1915, at St. Paul's Reformed Episcopal Church to Edna L. McMunn. It was reported that the couple will make their home in Philadelphia after a honeymoon to Bermuda. He also received news of his transfer to the St. Louis Federal league team on his wedding day. St. Louis later decided they didn't need his services and he was returned to the Chicago Federal League club, hoping he could be available by opening day.

He died in Columbus, Ohio on November 4, 1974.
