= Mike Prendergast (baseball) =

American baseball player (1888–1967)

- Prendergast pitching in 1917
- Pitcher
- Born: December 15, 1888; Arlington, Illinois, U.S.
- Died: November 18, 1967 (aged 78); Omaha, Nebraska, U.S.
- Batted: Right Threw: Right

MLB debut
- April 26, 1914, for the Chicago Federals

Last MLB appearance
- June 9, 1919, for the Philadelphia Phillies

MLB statistics
- Win–loss record: 41–53
- Earned run average: 2.74
- Strikeouts: 311
- Stats at Baseball Reference

Teams
- Chicago Federals/Whales (1914–1915); Chicago Cubs (1916–1917); Philadelphia Phillies (1918–1919)

Michael Thomas Prendergast (December 15, 1888 – November 18, 1967) was an American pitcher in Major League Baseball. His nickname during his playing years was "Iron Mike".

Mike was born in Arlington, Illinois, to parents, Jeremiah Prendergast and Catherine Louise Corcoran, both natives of County Waterford, Ireland.

In 1914 and 1915, he pitched for the Chicago Whales of the Federal League. When the Federal League ceased operations in 1915 and merged with the Chicago Cubs, Mike joined the Cubs organization. He pitched with the Cubs in 1916 and 1917. After the 1917 season, he was traded to the Philadelphia Phillies where he played in 1918 and 1919.

After his retirement from baseball Mike and his wife relocated to Omaha, Nebraska, and he worked at Falstaff Brewery.

In 1932, Mike won the Omaha Ping Pong championship.

He died in Omaha on November 18, 1967, and is buried in Calvary Cemetery in Omaha.

Mike's younger brother, Jeremiah "Jerry" Prendergast, nicknamed Jade, also played some minor league baseball.
