= Ad Brennan =

American baseball player (1887–1962)

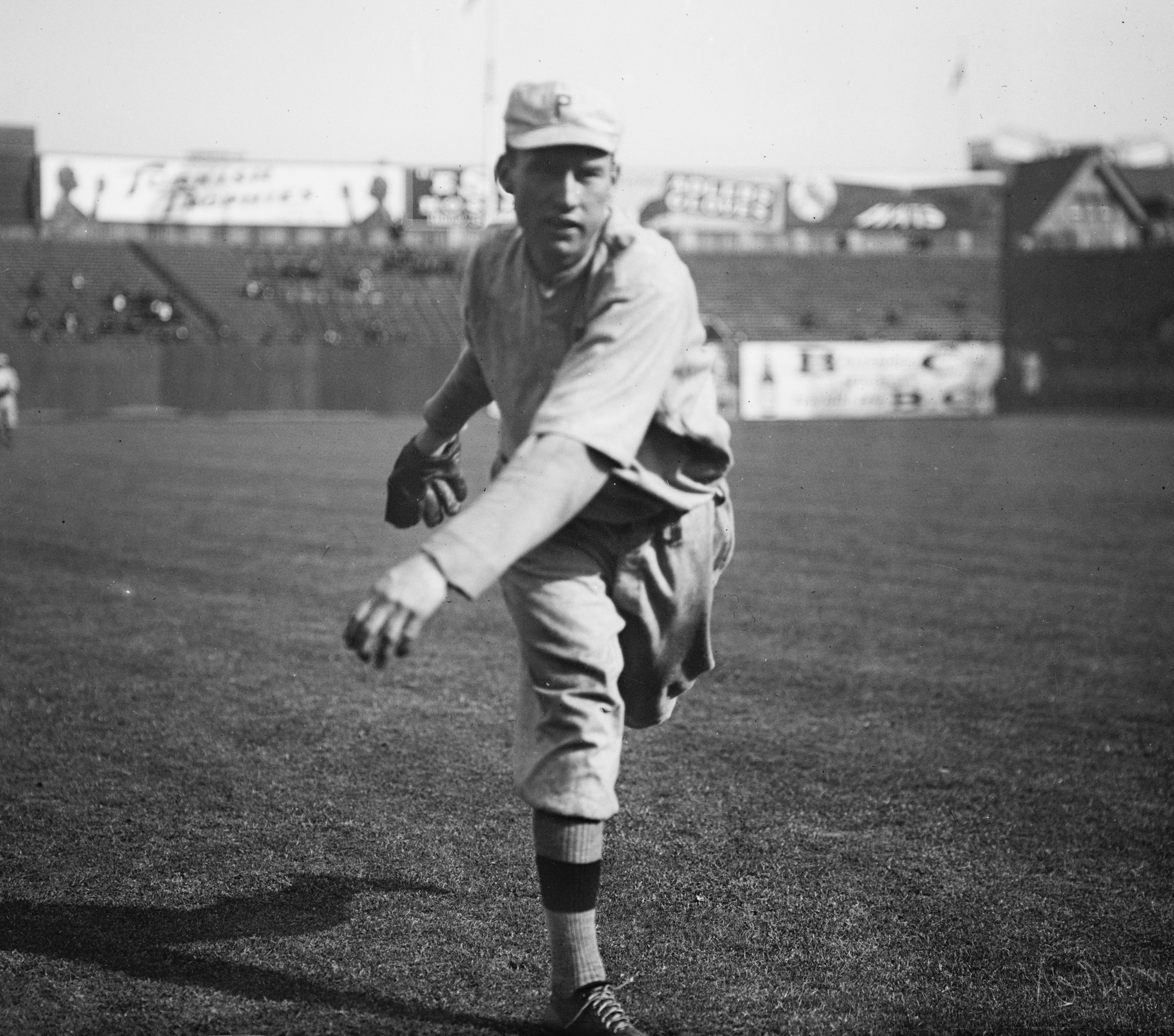
- Pitcher
- Born: July 18, 1887; La Harpe, Kansas, U.S.
- Died: January 7, 1962 (aged 74); Kansas City, Missouri, U.S.
- Batted: Left Threw: Left

MLB debut
- May 19, 1910, for the Philadelphia Phillies

Last MLB appearance
- July 27, 1918, for the Cleveland Indians

MLB statistics
- Win–loss record: 37–36
- Earned run average: 3.11
- Strikeouts: 283
- Stats at Baseball Reference

Teams
- Philadelphia Phillies (1910–1913); Chicago Chi-Feds/Whales (1914–1915); Washington Senators (1918); Cleveland Indians (1918)

Addison Foster Brennan (July 18, 1887 – January 7, 1962) was an American pitcher in Major League Baseball.

Brennan began his professional career in 1908 with the Springfield Midgets. He played in 1909 with the Wichita Jobbers, and had a win–loss record of 18–16 with them that season. After the season, the Cincinnati Reds purchased his contract without having seen him pitch. The Philadelphia Phillies traded for him in January 1910 due to finding this out, acquiring Brennan and Bob Ewing for Harry Coveleski and Frank Corridon.

Brennan made his major league debut on May 19, 1910, and played in 19 games his rookie season, finishing the year with a 2–0 record and a 2.33 earned run average (ERA). The following season, he split the season between the Phillies and the Buffalo Bisons. In 1912, he rejoined the Phillies' major league roster full-time, and pitched for them until a late-July bout of Diphtheria sidelined him for the rest of the season. In 27 games he had an 11–9 record and a 3.57 ERA. The following season, Brennan pitched in 40 games, and had a career-high of 14 wins, 12 losses, and a 2.39 ERA. In one game against the New York Giants, manager John McGraw threw insults at Brennan while he was pitching. After the game, Brennan went after McGraw and punched him twice; both were fined and suspended for five days.

After the season ended, Brennan jumped to the newly formed Federal League and signed a three-year deal with the Chicago Federals. He pitched in 16 games in 1914 and 19 games in 1915, and spent most of both seasons suffering from arm trouble. He then spent two years with the minor league Atlanta Crackers, winning 28 games over that time. His career ended the following year after playing in two games for the Washington Senators and one game for the Cleveland Indians.

After retiring, he served as head coach of the Fulton High School baseball team for two decades, and lived in Kansas City, Missouri until his death in 1962.
