= Al Wickland =

American baseball player (1888–1980)

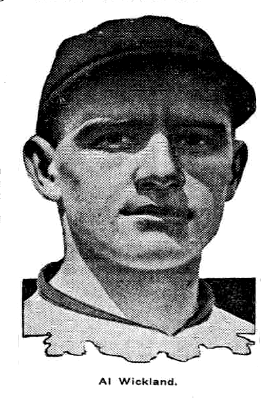
- Outfielder
- Born: January 27, 1888; Chicago, Illinois, U.S.
- Died: March 14, 1980 (aged 92); Port Washington, Wisconsin, U.S.
- Batted: Left Threw: Left

MLB debut
- August 21, 1913, for the Cincinnati Reds

Last MLB appearance
- August 15, 1919, for the New York Yankees

MLB statistics
- Batting average: .270
- Home runs: 12
- Runs batted in: 144
- Stats at Baseball Reference

Teams
- Cincinnati Reds (1913); Chicago Chi-Feds/Whales (1914–1915); Pittsburgh Rebels (1915); Boston Braves (1918); New York Yankees (1919)

Al Wickland (January 27, 1888 – March 14, 1980) was an American outfielder in Major League Baseball.

In 444 games over five seasons, Wickland posted a .270 batting average (397-for-1468) with 212 runs, 58 doubles, 38 triples, 12 home runs, 144 RBIs, 58 stolen bases, 207 bases on balls, .364 on-base percentage and .386 slugging percentage. He finished his career with a .968 fielding percentage playing at all three outfield positions.

== Sources ==
- Career statistics from MLB · Baseball Reference · Fangraphs · Baseball Reference (Minors) · Retrosheet · Baseball Almanac
