= Max Fiske =

American baseball player (1888-1928)

- Pitcher
- Born: October 12, 1888; Chicago, Illinois
- Died: May 25, 1928 (aged 39); Chicago, Illinois
- Batted: Right Threw: Right

MLB debut
- April 19, 1914, for the Chicago Federals

Last MLB appearance
- October 6, 1914, for the Chicago Federals

MLB statistics
- Win–loss record: 12–12
- Earned run average: 3.14
- Strikeouts: 87
- Stats at Baseball Reference

Teams
- Chicago Federals (1914)

Maximilian Patrick "Ski" Fiske (October 12, 1888 in Chicago, Illinois – May 25, 1928 in Chicago, Illinois) was a pitcher for the Chicago Federals professional baseball team in 1914.
