= Jack Farrell (infielder) =

American baseball player (1892-1918)

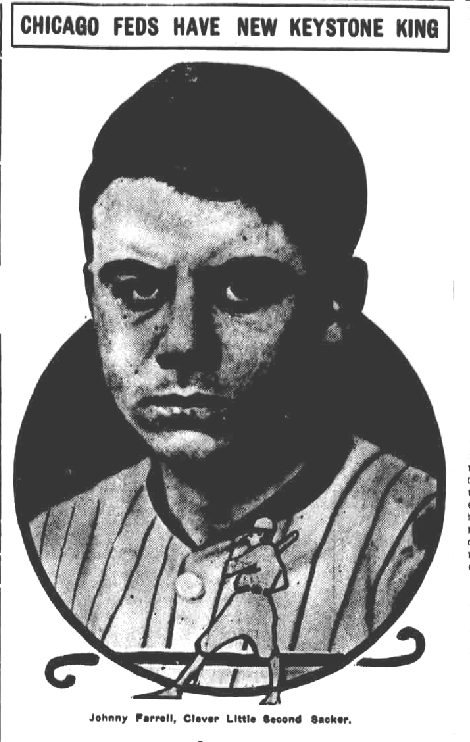
- Second baseman
- Born: December 19, 1892; Chicago, Illinois, U.S.
- Died: March 24, 1918 (aged 25); Chicago, Illinois, U.S.
- Batted: Both Threw: right

MLB debut
- April 16, 1914, for the Chicago Federals

Last MLB appearance
- July 5, 1915, for the Chicago Whales

MLB statistics
- Batting average: .229
- Home runs: 0
- Runs batted in: 49
- Stats at Baseball Reference

Teams
- Chicago Federals/Whales (1914–1915)

John Joseph Farrell (December 19, 1892 – March 24, 1918) was an American baseball player, playing as a second baseman in Major League Baseball. He died in Chicago, Illinois after suffering from pneumonia.
