= Bill Jackson (first baseman) =

American baseball player (1881-1958)

- Outfielder / First baseman
- Born: April 4, 1881; Pittsburgh, Pennsylvania, U.S.
- Died: September 24, 1958 (aged 77); Peoria, Illinois, U.S.
- Batted: Left Threw: Left

debut
- April 30, 1914, for the Chicago Federals

Last appearance
- October 2, 1915, for the Chicago Whales

Career statistics
- Batting Average: .138
- Home Runs: 1
- Fielding Percentage: .981
- Stats at Baseball Reference

Teams
- Chicago Federals/Whales (1914–1915)

William Riley Jackson (April 4, 1881 – September 24, 1958) was an American first baseman for the Chicago Whales baseball team in 1914 and 1915. He managed in the minor leagues for a number of teams between 1917 and 1925.
