= Dutch Zwilling =

American baseball player (1888–1978)

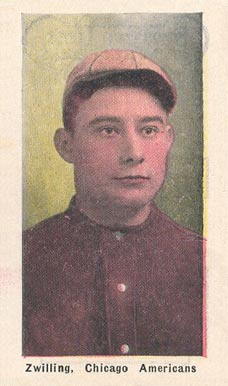
- Outfielder
- Born: November 2, 1888; St. Louis, Missouri, U.S.
- Died: March 27, 1978 (aged 89); La Crescenta, California, U.S.
- Batted: Left Threw: Left

MLB debut
- August 14, 1910, for the Chicago White Sox

Last MLB appearance
- July 12, 1916, for the Chicago Cubs

MLB statistics
- Batting average: .284
- Home runs: 30
- Runs batted in: 202
- Stats at Baseball Reference

Teams
- Chicago White Sox (1910); Chicago Chi-Feds/Whales (1914–1915); Chicago Cubs (1916)

Career highlights and awards
- Federal League champion (1915); Federal League home run champion (1914); Federal League RBI champion (1915)

Edward Harrison "Dutch" Zwilling (November 2, 1888 – March 27, 1978) was an American professional baseball player. He played in Major League Baseball (MLB) as an outfielder for four seasons. He first played for the Chicago White Sox of the American League in 1910, then for the Chicago Whales of the Federal League from 1914 to 1915, and lastly, the Chicago Cubs of the National League in 1916. He, along with Lave Cross, Willie Keeler, and Rollie Zeider, are the only players to have played for at least three different teams in the same city. Zwilling was the last surviving member of the 1915 Chicago Whales, the last champion of the Federal League.

Alphabetically, Zwilling was listed last among all MLB players in history, until Tony Zych made his MLB debut in 2015.

His most significant playing-time occurred while in the FL, and is the short-lived league's all-time leader in home runs with 29.

In 366 games over four seasons, Zwilling posted a .284 batting average (364-for-1280) with 167 runs, 30 home runs and 202 RBIs. He finished his major league career with a .969 fielding percentage as a centerfielder.

== See also ==
- List of Major League Baseball annual home run leaders
- List of Major League Baseball annual runs batted in leaders
