= Max Flack =

American baseball player (1890–1975)

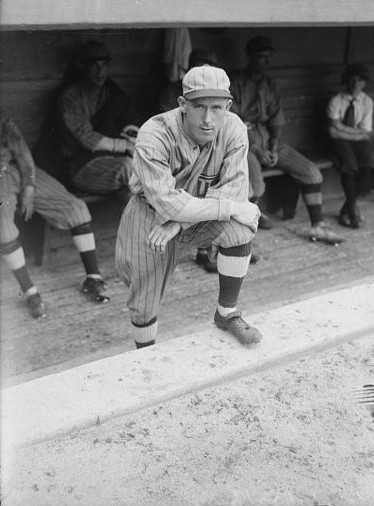
- Outfielder
- Born: February 5, 1890; Belleville, Illinois, U.S.
- Died: July 31, 1975 (aged 85); Belleville, Illinois, U.S.
- Batted: Left Threw: Left

MLB debut
- April 16, 1914, for the Chicago Chi-Feds

Last MLB appearance
- September 3, 1925, for the St. Louis Cardinals

MLB statistics
- Batting average: .278
- Home runs: 35
- Runs batted in: 391
- Stats at Baseball Reference

Teams
- Chicago Chi-Feds / Whales (1914–1915); Chicago Cubs (1916–1922); St. Louis Cardinals (1922–1925)

Max John Flack (February 5, 1890 – July 31, 1975) was an American Major League Baseball outfielder. He played twelve seasons in the majors from 1914 to 1925 for the Chicago Chi-Feds/Whales (1914–15) of the Federal League, then the Chicago Cubs (1916–22) and the St. Louis Cardinals (1922–25) of the National League.

== Career ==
Flack's career with Chicago got off to a great start. He stole 37 bases in each of his first two seasons. In his second year with the team, Flack's .314 batting average was fifth-best in the National League for the 1915 season. He led the league in sacrifice hits in 1916 and had a career-best 172 hits in 1921. Flack finished his big-league career with 1,461 hits and 200 steals. He topped the .300 mark three times.

== World Series ==
Flack was labeled the "goat" of the 1918 World Series. In the third inning of Game 6, at Fenway Park, playing for the Cubs, his throwing error resulted in two Boston Red Sox runs, which provided the Bosox with the margin of victory, and a Series win, the last the Red Sox would achieve until 2004. Flack's possible involvement in throwing that World Series has recently come to light. Although nothing conclusive was said, Chicago White Sox pitcher Eddie Cicotte, who threw the 1919 World Series, has referenced the 1918 Cubs as having inspired the "Black Sox." Of all the players on that team whose performance was murky, it was Flack, who had multiple strange errors and was picked off twice in one game, who had the most suspicious performance. He remains the only player to get picked off twice in one game in a World Series.

== Between-games trade ==
Flack is remembered, along with Cliff Heathcote, for being half of a unique player swap. On May 30, 1922, the Cardinals were playing a Memorial Day doubleheader at Cubs Park. Between games, Flack was traded for Heathcote. Both men appeared in both games that day.

== See also ==
- List of Major League Baseball career stolen bases leaders
