= Rollie Zeider =

American baseball player (1883–1967)

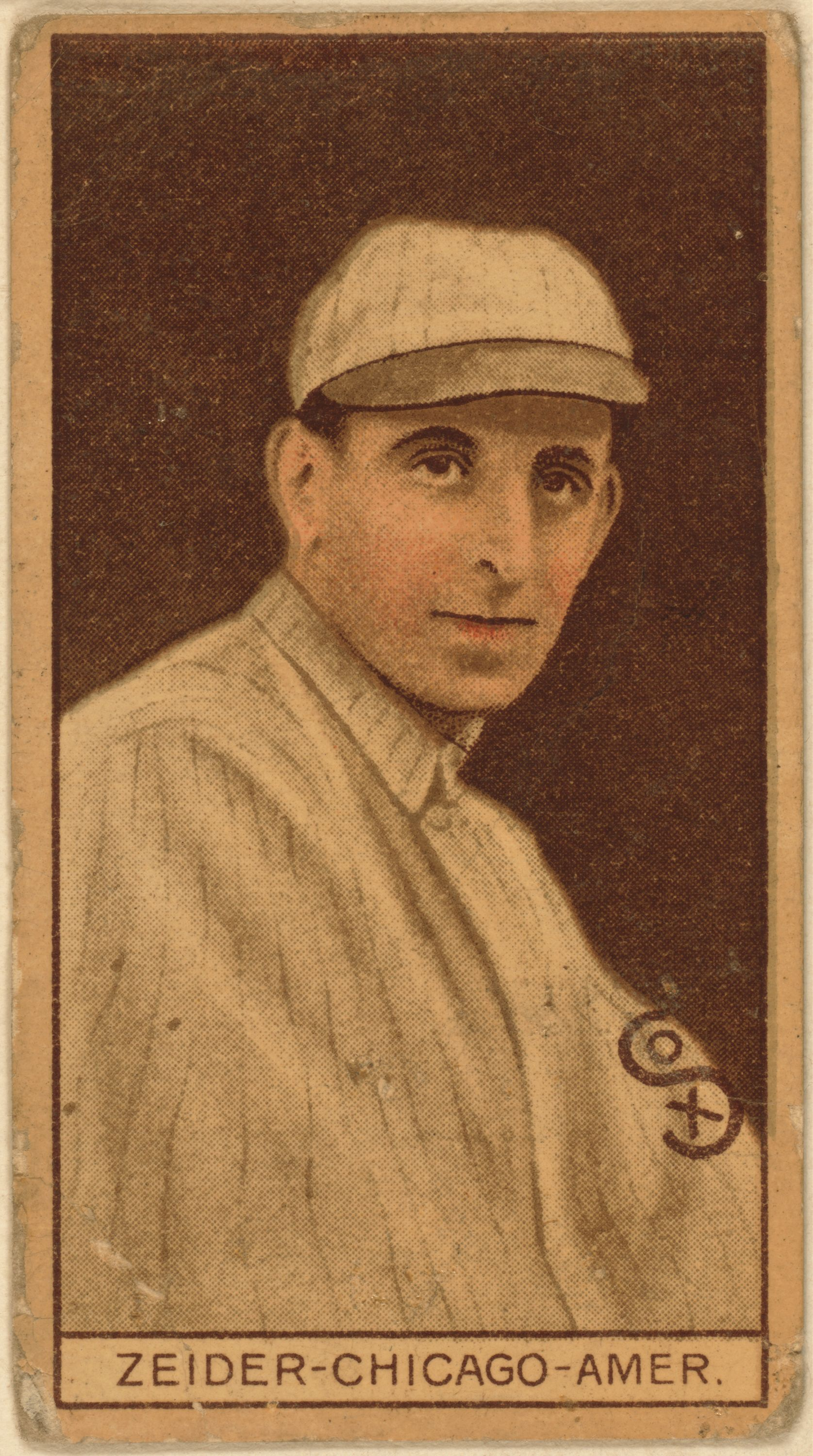
- Infielder
- Born: November 16, 1883; Hoover, Indiana, U.S.
- Died: September 12, 1967 (aged 83); Garrett, Indiana, U.S.
- Batted: Right Threw: Right

MLB debut
- April 14, 1910, for the Chicago White Sox

Last MLB appearance
- September 11, 1918, for the Chicago Cubs

MLB statistics
- Batting average: .240
- Home runs: 5
- Runs batted in: 253
- Stolen bases: 223
- Stats at Baseball Reference

Teams
- Chicago White Sox (1910–1913); New York Yankees (1913); Chicago Chi-Feds/Whales (1914–1915); Chicago Cubs (1916–1918)

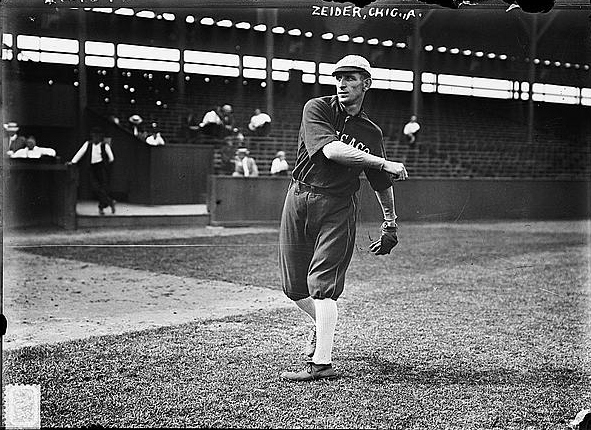
Zeider with the Chicago White Sox in 1912

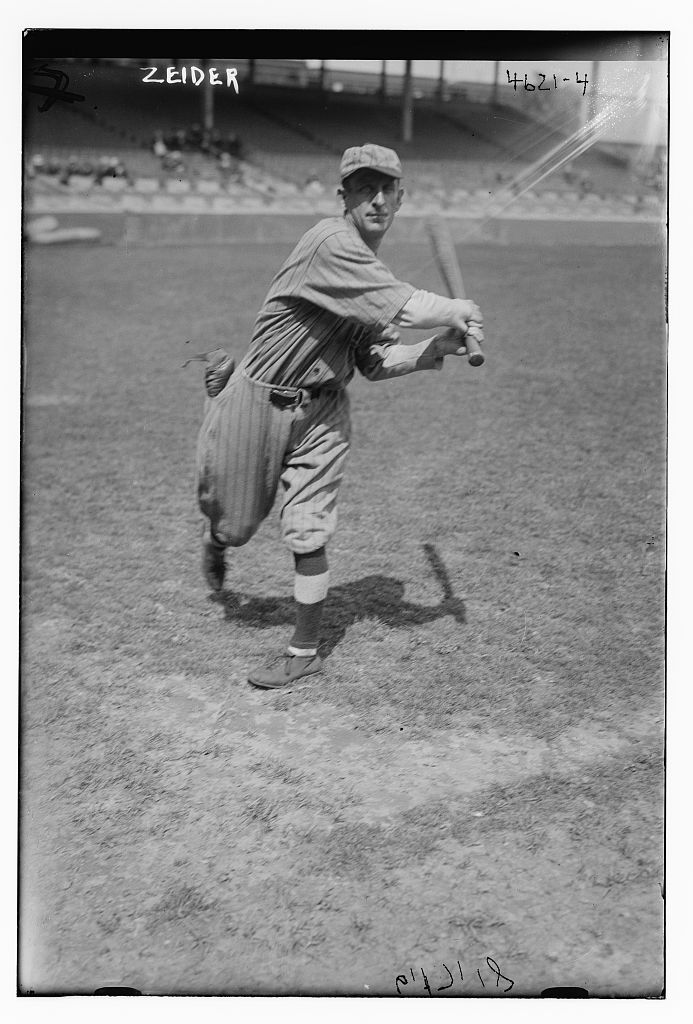
Zeider with the Chicago Cubs in 1918

Rollie Hubert Zeider (November 16, 1883 – September 12, 1967) was an American professional baseball player. An infielder (playing over 100 games at all four infield positions in his career), he played nine seasons in the major leagues for the Chicago White Sox (1910–13), New York Yankees (1913), Chicago Chi-Feds/Chicago Whales in the Federal League from 1914 to 1915, and lastly the Chicago Cubs (1916–18).

He is one of only a few players to play for three different Chicago teams in his career, and one of two to do it in the 20th century. He is the only player to hit home runs for all three Chicago major league teams in the twentieth century. Along with Dutch Zwilling he is the only 20th-century player to play in the same city in three different major leagues: American League (White Sox), Federal League (Chi-Feds/Whales), and the National League (Cubs).

Zeider contributed to another odd record along with Zwilling. The 1916 Cubs were one of the few teams in history, and the most recent until 1999, to have three players whose last names begin with "Z": Zeider, Zwilling, and Heinie Zimmerman. The 1999 Texas Rangers were the first and only since then with Jeff Zimmerman, Todd Zeile, and Gregg Zaun.

He earned the nickname Bunion, the result of a spike wound when Detroit Tigers outfielder Sam Crawford spiked his "bunion" during a play. (Note: Some newspapers dressed up the story by saying it was the notorious Ty Cobb that spiked Zeider, but according to the 7-26-1913 issue of Sporting Life, the protest from club owner Frank Farrell to the AL President says: "Zeider has informed [manager] Chance that ... he was spiked by Crawford in Detroit.") Zeider's bunion became a news item when he was traded after the injury and his new club, the New York Yankees, which he would captain during his brief tenure, later protested that the White Sox had not informed them that Zeider was injured at the time of the trade.

== Playing career ==
Zeider began his professional career in 1905, which he split between the Crookston Crooks and Winnipeg Maroons of the Northern League. In 1909, he played third base for the minor-league San Francisco Seals. On August 17 of that year, Zeider was acquired from the Seals by the White Sox for $5,500 and two players.

Playing for the New York Yankees in 1913, he would replace Frank Chance as team captain, becoming the sixth Yankee captain. He would hold the captaincy for the remainder of the year.

After the 1918 season, Zeider returned to the minor leagues. He played for the Toledo Mud Hens in 1919, and finished his career in 1924 with the Paris North Stars of the class-D East Texas League.

In a nine-season career, he batted .240 with 5 home runs and 253 runs batted in during 941 games. He stole 223 bases in his career and scored 393 runs. He had 769 hits in 3210 at bats. In his only World Series appearance (1918 with the Cubs), Zeider had two plate appearances and walked twice.

=== Base stealing ===
The right-handed Zeider was one of the fastest players in the game, even at the time. With the White Sox, as a rookie, Zeider stole 49 bases, his career high, which was also a modern-day major league record for rookies at that time. (Note: Tied by Sonny Jackson in 1966, and broken by Gene Richards with 56 in 177)

He reached the top five in stolen bases twice (his 1910 rookie season, and 1912). Besides those two seasons, Zeider's early career came as a utility player. Not until 1914 did he begin to play regularly every year. By that time, his speed had decreased, but he still was eighth in the league in steals with 35 that year (tied with Tom Downey and Baldy Louden) in what would be arguably his best full season.

== Personal life ==
Zeider was born in the small town of Hoover near Logansport in Cass County, Indiana, where his father was a farmer, and grew up in Auburn, Indiana, where his father took a job in a sawmill. Zeider was married twice, first to Alberta Doyle, who died of tuberculosis in 1916, then to Margaret Pilgrim.

After retiring from professional baseball, he ran a restaurant in Garrett, Indiana, called Polly's Tavern. ("Polly" was his local nickname.) He moved to Orland, Indiana, in neighboring Steuben County in 1959. Zeider was inducted into the Northeast Indiana Baseball Association Hall of Fame in 1965.

Zeider died in a hospital in Garrett, aged 83, and was interred beside his first wife in Woodlawn Cemetery in Auburn.

== See also ==
- List of Major League Baseball career stolen bases leaders
- Wrigley Field: Weeghman Park and the Federal League (1913–1915)
