= Chicago Whales =

Professional baseball team, 1914–1915

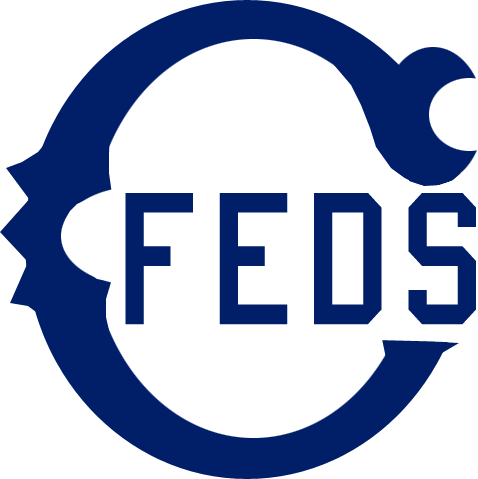
- Logo

Information
- Location: Chicago, Illinois
- Founded: 1913
- Disbanded: 1915
- Nicknames: Chicago Keeleys (1913); Chicago Federals (1914); Chicago Whales (1915)
- League championships: 1 (1915)
- Former name: Chicago Federals (1914)
- Former league: Federal League
- Former ballpark: Weeghman Park
- Colors: blue, white
- Ownership: Charles Weeghman
- Manager: Burt Keeley (1913); Joe Tinker (1914–1915)

The Chicago Whales were a professional baseball team based in Chicago. They played in the Federal League, a short-lived "third Major League", in 1914 and 1915. They originally lacked a formal nickname, and were known simply as the "Chicago Federals" (or "Chi-Feds") to distinguish them from the Chicago Cubs and Chicago White Sox.

The team came in second in the Federal League rankings in 1914 and won the league championship in 1915. They came to an end when the Federal League came to a deal with the National and American Leagues that disbanded all its teams. The Whales are notable as the original occupants of the stadium now known as Wrigley Field, the current home of the Chicago Cubs and the only Federal League stadium still in use.

== History ==
The Chicago team played the 1913 initial season of the Federal League, as the new league was formed as an independent minor league. Without a formal nickname, the team was called the Chicago Keeleys in 1913, after manager Burt Keeley. The 1913 Chicago team ended the season in fourth place with a 57–62 record, finishing 17.5 games behind the first place Indianapolis Hoosiers (75–45). The Cleveland Green Sox (64–54), St. Louis Terriers (59–60) Covington Blue Sox/Kansas City Packers (32–45) and Pittsburgh Filipinos (49–71) were the other members of the 1913 six-team Federal League.

For that first season, the ball club played their games at DePaul University's athletic field. It was on a block bounded by Belden Avenue (north); Sheffield Avenue (east); University buildings and Webster Avenue (south); and Osgood Street (now Kenmore Avenue) (west). DePaul eventually built a student center and parking lots on the site.

As the 1913 season was being played, the Federal League began talks of its future and decided to continue playing with the design of becoming a major league in 1914. Chicago businessman James A. Gilmore was appointed Federal League president, replacing John T. Powers. Gilmore initially secured Charles Weeghman, a wealthy Chicago restaurateur, to become the owner of the Chicago franchise in the Federal League. Gilmore further positioned the league by securing influential owners in Brooklyn, New York and St. Louis, Missouri.

The 1914 Chicago club finished 1½ games behind the Indianapolis Hoosiers in the inaugural major league season for the league. The team lacked a formal nickname and was known simply as the Chicago Federals. Before the start of the season, Weeghman built a stadium for the team, called Weeghman Park, designed by Zachary Taylor Davis, who had previously designed Comiskey Park. He also leased the parcel on which the park stood for 99 years. Coincidentally, this site was about two miles straight north of the DePaul athletic field which had been their home in 1913.

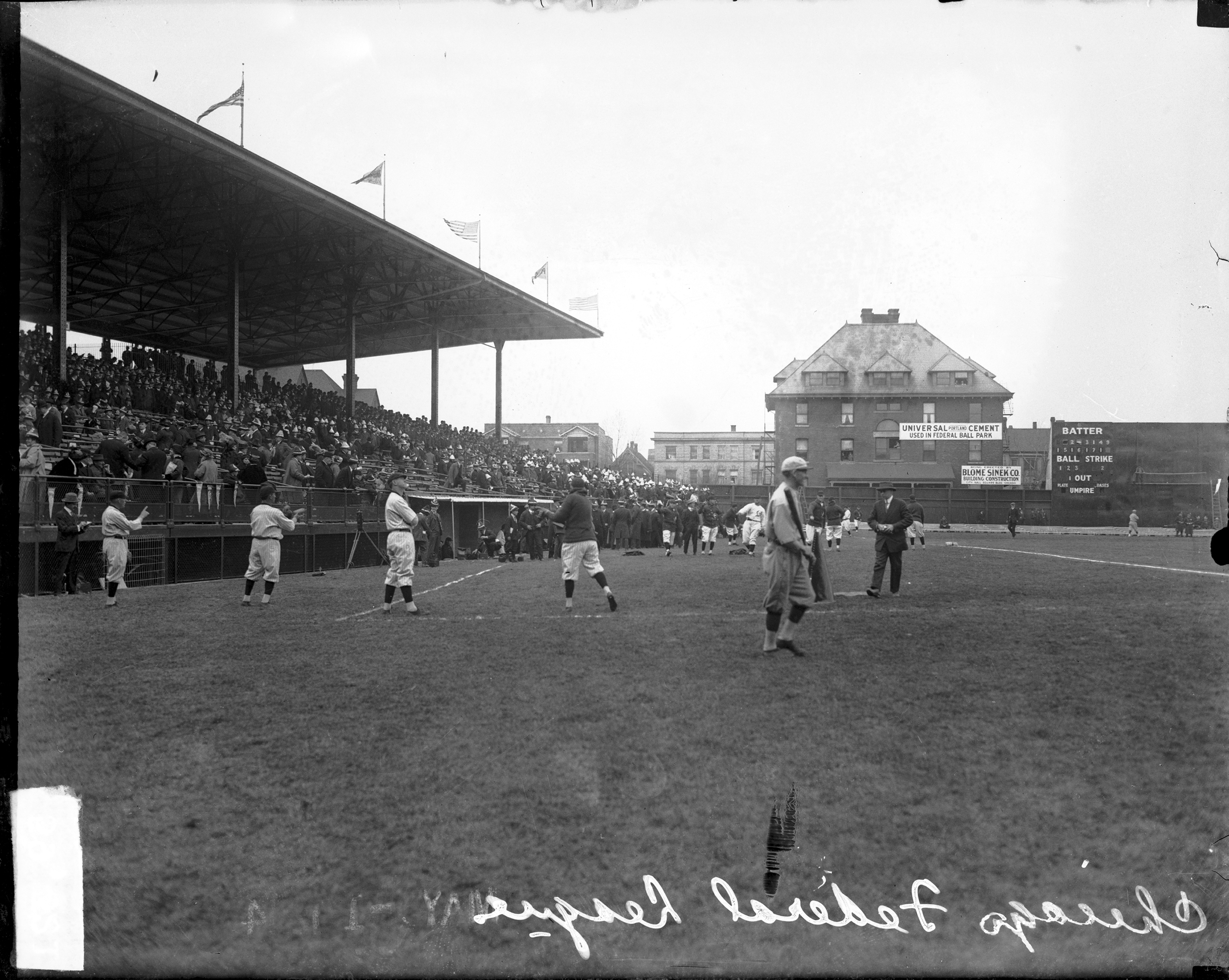
Chicago Federals playing at Weeghman Park in April 1914

For the 1915 season, Weeghman held a public contest to choose a formal nickname for the club. Nearly 300 entries were submitted, and Weeghman chose "Whales", saying that it "carried a suggestion of athletic prowess and power", as well as being "absolutely unique as a nickname." In the league's second (and final) season, the Chicago uniforms included the logo of a whale "with its tail flopped high just as if it had destroyed an enemy", inside a large "C" on their uniform shirts. The Whales won the league championship, finishing with 86 wins and 66 losses, percentage points ahead of the St. Louis Terriers' 87–67 record.

When Kenesaw Mountain Landis brokered a deal between the Federal League, American League and National League that ended the Federal League's existence, Weeghman was allowed to buy a controlling interest in the Cubs. He then merged the Whales with the Cubs and moved the Cubs from West Side Park into his new steel-and-concrete structure. While Weeghman himself was forced out within four years due to financial troubles, the Cubs still play in the park he built to this day, the only Federal League park still in use. It was renamed Cubs Park in 1920 and acquired its present name, Wrigley Field, in 1926.

Many Whales players had American and National League experience, including manager Joe Tinker, Dutch Zwilling, Mordecai Brown, and Rollie Zeider.

As the Federals, they played the first game at Wrigley Field on April 23, 1914, and to mark the park's centennial on April 23, 2014, the Cubs wore the Federals' uniforms.

== Baseball Hall of Famers ==
Chicago Whales Hall of Famers
Affiliation according to the National Baseball Hall of Fame and Museum

Mordecai Brown
Joe Tinker

- Players and managers listed in **bold** are depicted on their Hall of Fame plaques wearing a Whales cap insignia.

== See also ==
- Chicago Whales all-time roster
- 1914 Chicago Federals season
- 1915 Chicago Whales season
