= List of Major League Baseball players (R) =

The following is a list of Major League Baseball players, retired or active. As of the end of the 2011 season, there have been 945 players with a last name that begins with R who have been on a major league roster at some point.

== R ==
For reasons of space, this list has been split into two pages:

- Brian Raabe through Phil Rizzuto
- Sendy Rleal through Marc Rzepczynski
