= List of Major League Baseball players (Ra–Ri) =

The following is a list of Major League Baseball players, retired or active.

== Ra through Ri ==
Name	Debut	Final game	Position	Teams	Ref
Brian Raabe	September 17, 1995	September 28, 1997	Third baseman	Minnesota Twins, Seattle Mariners, Colorado Rockies	
John Rabb	September 4, 1982	July 31, 1988	Catcher	San Francisco Giants, Atlanta Braves, Seattle Mariners	
Joe Rabbitt	September 15, 1922	September 21, 1922	Outfielder	Cleveland Indians	
Charlie Rabe	September 21, 1957	June 4, 1958	Pitcher	Cincinnati Redlegs	
Josh Rabe	July 17, 2006	May 9, 2007	Outfielder	Minnesota Twins	
Mike Rabelo	September 23, 2006	June 22, 2008	Catcher	Detroit Tigers, Florida Marlins	
Ryan Raburn	September 12, 2004		Utility player	Detroit Tigers	
Steve Rachunok	September 17, 1940	September 26, 1940	Pitcher	Brooklyn Dodgers	
Marv Rackley	April 15, 1947	May 8, 1950	Outfielder	Brooklyn Dodgers, Pittsburgh Pirates, Cincinnati Reds	
Mike Raczka	August 15, 1992	September 23, 1992	Pitcher	Oakland Athletics	
Dick Radatz	April 10, 1962	August 15, 1969	Pitcher	Boston Red Sox, Cleveland Indians, Chicago Cubs, Detroit Tigers, Montreal Expos	
Charles Radbourn β	May 5, 1880	August 11, 1891	Pitcher	Providence Grays, Boston Beaneaters, Boston Reds, Cincinnati Reds	
George Radbourn	May 30, 1883	June 6, 1883	Pitcher	Detroit Wolverines	
Rip Radcliff	September 17, 1934	September 29, 1943	Outfielder	Chicago White Sox, St. Louis Browns	
John Radcliff	May 20, 1871	May 24, 1875	Shortstop	Philadelphia Athletics (1860–76), Baltimore Canaries, Philadelphia White Stockings, Philadelphia Centennials	
Roy Radebaugh	September 22, 1911	September 28, 1911	Pitcher	St. Louis Cardinals	
Dave Rader	September 5, 1971	October 5, 1980	Catcher	San Francisco Giants, St. Louis Cardinals, Chicago Cubs, Philadelphia Phillies, Boston Red Sox	
Don Rader	July 25, 1913	October 1, 1921	Shortstop	Chicago White Sox, Philadelphia Phillies	
Doug Rader	July 31, 1967	October 2, 1977	Third baseman	Houston Astros, San Diego Padres, Toronto Blue Jays	
Drew Rader	July 18, 1921	July 18, 1921	Pitcher	Pittsburgh Pirates	
Paul Radford	May 1, 1883	September 29, 1894	Outfielder	Boston Beaneaters, Providence Grays, Kansas City Cowboys (NL), New York Metropolitans, Brooklyn Bridegrooms, Cleveland Spiders, Cleveland Infants, Boston Reds, Washington Senators (1891–99)	
Scott Radinsky	April 9, 1990	October 5, 2001	Pitcher	Chicago White Sox, Los Angeles Dodgers, St. Louis Cardinals, Cleveland Indians	
Brad Radke	April 29, 1995	September 28, 2006	Pitcher	Minnesota Twins	
Rob Radlosky	May 25, 1999	June 22, 1999	Pitcher	Minnesota Twins	
Ryan Radmanovich	April 13, 1998	September 27, 1998	Outfielder	Seattle Mariners	
Jack Radtke	August 1, 1936	September 26, 1936	Second baseman	Brooklyn Dodgers	
Hal Raether	July 4, 1954	May 19, 1957	Pitcher	Philadelphia Athletics/Kansas City Athletics	
Ken Raffensberger	April 25, 1939	June 2, 1954	Pitcher	St. Louis Cardinals, Chicago Cubs, Philadelphia Phillies, Cincinnati Reds/Redlegs	
Al Raffo	April 29, 1969	September 29, 1969	Pitcher	Philadelphia Phillies	
Jack Rafter	September 24, 1904	September 24, 1904	Catcher	Pittsburgh Pirates	
Tom Raftery	April 18, 1909	June 27, 1909	Outfielder	Cleveland Naps	
Pat Ragan	April 21, 1909	July 5, 1923	Pitcher	Cincinnati Reds, Chicago Cubs, Brooklyn Dodgers/Superbas/Robins, Boston Braves, New York Giants, Chicago White Sox, Philadelphia Phillies	
Rip Ragan	September 19, 1903	September 27, 1903	Pitcher	Cincinnati Reds	
Brady Raggio	April 15, 1997	July 12, 2003	Pitcher	St. Louis Cardinals, Arizona Diamondbacks	
Frank Ragland	April 17, 1932	September 24, 1933	Pitcher	Washington Senators, Philadelphia Phillies	
Tom Ragland	April 5, 1971	September 29, 1973	Second baseman	Washington Senators, Texas Rangers, Cleveland Indians	
Eric Raich	May 24, 1975	September 12, 1976	Pitcher	Cleveland Indians	
Steve Rain	July 17, 1999	September 29. 2000	Pitcher	Chicago Cubs	
Larry Raines	April 16, 1957	September 26, 1958	Utility infielder	Cleveland Indians	
Tim Raines	September 11, 1979	September 29, 2002	Outfielder	Montreal Expos, Chicago White Sox, New York Yankees, Oakland Athletics, Baltimore Orioles, Florida Marlins	
Tim Raines Jr.	October 1, 2001	October 3, 2004	Outfielder	Baltimore Orioles	
Chuck Rainey	April 8, 1979	September 9, 1984	Pitcher	Boston Red Sox, Chicago Cubs, Oakland Athletics	
John Rainey	August 25, 1887	July 29, 1890	Utility player	New York Giants, Buffalo Bisons (PL)	
Dave Rajsich	July 2, 1978	September 17, 1980	Pitcher	New York Yankees, Texas Rangers	
Gary Rajsich	April 9, 1982	July 1, 1985	Utility player	New York Mets, St. Louis Cardinals, San Francisco Giants	
Aaron Rakers	September 8, 2004	April 19, 2007	Pitcher	Baltimore Orioles, San Diego Padres	
Jason Rakers	May 6, 1998	June 5, 2000	Pitcher	Cleveland Indians, Kansas City Royals	
Ed Rakow	April 22, 1960	September 28, 1967	Pitcher	Los Angeles Dodgers, Kansas City Athletics, Detroit Tigers, Atlanta Braves	
John Raleigh	August 4, 1909	July 12, 1910	Pitcher	St. Louis Cardinals	
Doc Ralston	September 8, 1910	October 6, 1910	Outfielder	Washington Senators	
Bob Ramazzotti	April 20, 1946	September 17, 1953	Utility infielder	Brooklyn Dodgers, Chicago Cubs	
Pep Rambert	September 23, 1939	September 29, 1940	Pitcher	Pittsburgh Pirates	
Pete Rambo	September 16, 1926	September 16, 1926	Pitcher	Philadelphia Phillies	
Alex Ramírez	September 19, 1998	September 27, 2000	Outfielder	Cleveland Indians, Pittsburgh Pirates	
Alexei Ramírez	March 31, 2008		Second baseman	Chicago White Sox	
Allan Ramirez	June 8, 1983	September 13, 1983	Pitcher	Baltimore Orioles	
Aramis Ramírez	May 26, 1998		Third baseman	Pittsburgh Pirates, Chicago Cubs	
Edwar Ramírez	July 3, 2007		Pitcher	New York Yankees, Oakland Athletics	
Elizardo Ramírez	May 25, 2004		Pitcher	Philadelphia Phillies, Cincinnati Reds, Texas Rangers	
Erasmo Ramirez	April 30, 2003	July 13, 2007	Pitcher	Texas Rangers, Oakland Athletics, Florida Marlins	
Hanley Ramírez	September 20, 2005		Shortstop	Boston Red Sox, Florida Marlins	
Héctor Ramírez	August 28, 1999	May 26, 2000	Pitcher	Milwaukee Brewers	
Horacio Ramírez	April 2, 2003		Pitcher	Atlanta Braves, Seattle Mariners, Kansas City Royals, Chicago White Sox, Los Angeles Angels of Anaheim	
Julio Ramírez	September 10, 1999	October 2, 2005	Outfielder	Florida Marlins, Chicago White Sox, Anaheim Angels, San Francisco Giants	
Manny Ramírez	September 2, 1993	April 6, 2011	Outfielder	Cleveland Indians, Boston Red Sox, Los Angeles Dodgers, Chicago White Sox, Tampa Bay Rays	
Mario Ramírez	April 25, 1980	October 5, 1985	Shortstop	New York Mets, San Diego Padres	
Max Ramírez	June 22, 2008		Catcher	Texas Rangers	
Milt Ramírez	April 11, 1970	August 1, 1979	Shortstop	St. Louis Cardinals, Oakland Athletics	
Orlando Ramírez	July 6, 1974	May 16, 1979	Shortstop	California Angels	
Rafael Ramírez	August 4, 1980	October 3, 1992	Shortstop	Atlanta Braves, Houston Astros	
Ramón Ramírez (P born 1981)	April 14, 2006		Pitcher	Colorado Rockies, Kansas City Royals, Boston Red Sox, San Francisco Giants	
Ramón Ramírez (P born 1982)	August 30, 2008		Pitcher	Cincinnati Reds	
Roberto Ramírez	June 12, 1998	October 1, 1999	Pitcher	San Diego Padres, Colorado Rockies	
Santiago Ramírez	May 24, 2006		Pitcher	Washington Nationals	
Wilkin Ramírez	May 20, 2009		Outfielder	Detroit Tigers, Atlanta Braves	
Bobby Ramos	September 26, 1978	September 9, 1984	Catcher	Montreal Expos, New York Yankees	
Cesar Ramos	September 16, 2009		Pitcher	San Diego Padres, Tampa Bay Rays	
Chucho Ramos	May 7, 1944	May 30, 1944	Outfielder	Cincinnati Reds	
Domingo Ramos	September 8, 1978	October 3, 1990	Utility infielder	New York Yankees, Toronto Blue Jays, Seattle Mariners, Cleveland Indians, California Angels, Chicago Cubs	
Edgar Ramos	May 21, 1997	May 30, 1997	Pitcher	Philadelphia Phillies	
John Ramos	September 18, 1991	October 5, 1991	Catcher	New York Yankees	
Ken Ramos	May 16, 1997	June 11, 1997	Outfielder	Houston Astros	
Mario Ramos	June 19, 2003	June 29, 2003	Pitcher	Texas Rangers	
Pedro Ramos	April 11, 1955	April 25, 1970	Pitcher	Washington Senators, Minnesota Twins, Cleveland Indians, New York Yankees, Philadelphia Phillies, Pittsburgh Pirates, Cincinnati Reds, Washington Senators (1961–1971)	
Wilson Ramos	May 2, 2010		Catcher	Minnesota Twins, Washington Nationals	
Robert Ramsay	August 27, 1999	September 30, 2000	Pitcher	Seattle Mariners	
Willie Ramsdell	September 24, 1947	July 15, 1952	Pitcher	Brooklyn Dodgers, Cincinnati Reds, Chicago Cubs	
Bill Ramsey	April 19, 1945	September 30, 1945	Outfielder	Boston Braves	
Fernando Ramsey	September 7, 1992	October 3, 1992	Outfielder	Chicago Cubs	
Mike Ramsey (IF)	September 4, 1978	May 30, 1985	Utility infielder	St. Louis Cardinals, Montreal Expos, Los Angeles Dodgers	
Mike Ramsey (OF)	April 6, 1987	October 3, 1987	Outfielder	Los Angeles Dodgers	
Toad Ramsey	September 5, 1885	September 17, 1890	Pitcher	Louisville Colonels, St. Louis Browns	
Dick Rand	September 16, 1953	September 17, 1957	Catcher	St. Louis Cardinals, Pittsburgh Pirates	
Joe Randa	April 30, 1995	October 1, 2006	Third baseman	Kansas City Royals, Pittsburgh Pirates, Detroit Tigers, Cincinnati Reds, San Diego Padres	
Bob Randall	April 13, 1976	May 31, 1980	Second baseman	Minnesota Twins	
Newt Randall	April 18, 1907	October 5, 1907	Outfielder	Chicago Cubs, Boston Doves	
Sap Randall	August 2, 1988	August 6, 1988	First baseman	Chicago White Sox	
Scott Randall	August 26, 2003	September 28, 2003	Pitcher	Chicago White Sox	
Lenny Randle	June 16, 1971	June 20, 1982	Utility infielder	Washington Senators (1961–1971), Texas Rangers, New York Mets, New York Yankees, Chicago Cubs, Seattle Mariners	
Stephen Randolph	March 31, 2003		Pitcher	Arizona Diamondbacks, Houston Astros	
Willie Randolph	July 29, 1975	October 4, 1992	Second baseman	Pittsburgh Pirates, New York Yankees, Los Angeles Dodgers, Oakland Athletics, Milwaukee Brewers, New York Mets	
Merritt Ranew	April 13, 1962	September 30, 1969	Catcher	Houston Astros, Chicago Cubs, Milwaukee Braves, California Angels, Seattle Pilots	
Ribs Raney	September 18, 1949	April 22, 1950	Pitcher	St. Louis Browns	
Cody Ransom	September 5, 2001		Shortstop	San Francisco Giants, Houston Astros, New York Yankees, Philadelphia Phillies, Arizona Diamondbacks	
Jeff Ransom	September 5, 1981	October 2, 1983	Catcher	San Francisco Giants	
Clay Rapada	June 14, 2007		Pitcher	Chicago Cubs, Detroit Tigers, Texas Rangers, Baltimore Orioles	
Earl Rapp	April 28, 1949	September 23, 1952	Outfielder	Detroit Tigers, Chicago White Sox, New York Giants, St. Louis Browns, Washington Senators	
Goldie Rapp	April 13, 1921	July 4, 1923	Third baseman	New York Giants, Philadelphia Phillies	
Pat Rapp	July 10, 1992	October 6, 2001	Pitcher	San Francisco Giants, Florida Marlins, Kansas City Royals, Boston Red Sox, Baltimore Orioles, Anaheim Angels	
Bill Rariden	August 12, 1909	October 2, 1920	Catcher	Boston Doves/Rustlers/Braves, Indianapolis Hoosiers (FL), Newark Peppers	
Vic Raschi	September 23, 1946	September 13, 1955	Pitcher	New York Yankees, St. Louis Cardinals, Kansas City Athletics	
Colby Rasmus	April 7, 2009		Outfielder	St. Louis Cardinals, Toronto Blue Jays	
Dennis Rasmussen	September 16, 1983	July 1, 1995	Pitcher	San Diego Padres, New York Yankees, Cincinnati Reds, Chicago Cubs, Kansas City Royals	
Eric Rasmussen	July 21, 1975	October 2, 1983	Pitcher	St. Louis Cardinals, San Diego Padres, Kansas City Royals	
Hans Rasmussen	August 11, 1915	August 13, 1915	Pitcher	Chicago Whales	
Darrell Rasner	September 6, 2005		Pitcher	Washington Nationals, New York Yankees	
Fred Rath Sr.	September 10, 1968	September 28, 1969	Pitcher	Chicago White Sox	
Fred Rath Jr.	July 29, 1998	August 4, 1998	Pitcher	Colorado Rockies	
Gary Rath	June 2, 1998	June 22, 1999	Pitcher	Los Angeles Dodgers, Minnesota Twins	
Morrie Rath	September 28, 1909	October 3, 1920	Second baseman	Philadelphia Athletics, Cleveland Naps, Chicago White Sox, Cincinnati Reds	
Gene Ratliff	May 15, 1965	August 8, 1965	Pinch hitter	Houston Astros	
Jon Ratliff	September 15, 2000	September 15, 2000	Pitcher	Oakland Athletics	
Paul Ratliff	April 14, 1963	July 23, 1972	Catcher	Minnesota Twins, Milwaukee Brewers	
Steve Ratzer	October 5, 1980	May 17, 1981	Pitcher	Montreal Expos	
Doug Rau	September 2, 1972	May 26, 1981	Pitcher	Los Angeles Dodgers, California Angels	
Tommy Raub	May 3, 1903	June 22, 1906	Catcher	Chicago Cubs, St. Louis Cardinals	
Bob Rauch	June 29, 1972	October 2, 1972	Pitcher	New York Mets	
Jon Rauch	April 2, 2002		Pitcher	Chicago White Sox, Montreal Expos, Washington Nationals, Arizona Diamondbacks, Minnesota Twins, Toronto Blue Jays	
Bob Raudman	September 13, 1966	September 12, 1967	Outfielder	Chicago Cubs	
Lance Rautzhan	July 23, 1977	June 3, 1979	Pitcher	Los Angeles Dodgers, Milwaukee Brewers	
Shane Rawley	April 6, 1978	September 17, 1989	Pitcher	Seattle Mariners, New York Yankees, Philadelphia Phillies, Minnesota Twins	
Johnny Rawlings	April 14, 1914	September 13, 1926	Second baseman	Cincinnati Reds, Kansas City Packers, Boston Braves, Philadelphia Phillies, New York Giants, Pittsburgh Pirates	
Carl Ray	September 25, 1915	May 9, 1916	Pitcher	Philadelphia Phillies	
Chris Ray	June 14, 2005		Pitcher	Baltimore Orioles, Texas Rangers, San Francisco Giants, Seattle Mariners	
Farmer Ray	June 13, 1910	September 20, 1910	Pitcher	St. Louis Browns	
Irv Ray	July 7, 1888	September 2, 1891	Shortstop	Boston Beaneaters, Baltimore Orioles (19th century)	
Jim Ray	September 16, 1965	September 30, 1974	Pitcher	Houston Astros, Detroit Tigers	
Johnny Ray	September 2, 1981	September 30, 1990	Second baseman	Pittsburgh Pirates, California Angels	
Ken Ray	July 10, 1999	September 30, 2006	Pitcher	Kansas City Royals, Atlanta Braves	
Larry Ray	September 10, 1982	October 2, 1982	Outfielder	Houston Astros	
Robert Ray	May 2, 2009		Pitcher	Toronto Blue Jays	
Curt Raydon	April 15, 1958	September 14, 1958	Pitcher	Pittsburgh Pirates	
Floyd Rayford	April 17, 1980	September 16, 1987	Third baseman	Baltimore Orioles, St. Louis Cardinals	
Fred Raymer	April 24, 1901	October 7, 1905	Second baseman	Chicago Cubs, Boston Beaneaters	
Bugs Raymond	September 23, 1904	June 16, 1911	Pitcher	Detroit Tigers, St. Louis Cardinals, New York Giants	
Claude Raymond	April 15, 1959	September 25, 1971	Pitcher	Chicago White Sox, Milwaukee Braves, Houston Astros, Atlanta Braves, Montreal Expos	
Harry Raymond	September 9, 1888	June 20, 1892	Third baseman	Louisville Colonels, Pittsburgh Pirates, Washington Senators (1891–99)	
Lou Raymond	May 2, 1919	May 2, 1919	Second baseman	Philadelphia Phillies	
John Raynor	April 8, 2010		Outfielder	Pittsburgh Pirates	
Barry Raziano	August 18, 1973	July 5, 1974	Pitcher	Kansas City Royals, California Angels	
Al Reach	May 20, 1871	May 21, 1875	Utility player	Philadelphia Athletics (1860–76)	
Bob Reach	April 18, 1872	October 23, 1873	Shortstop	Washington Olympics, Washington Blue Legs	
Randy Ready	September 4, 1983	July 9, 1995	Utility players	Milwaukee Brewers, San Diego Padres, Philadelphia Phillies, Oakland Athletics, Montreal Expos	
Britt Reames	August 20, 2000	August 27, 2006	Pitcher	St. Louis Cardinals, Montreal Expos, Oakland Athletics, Pittsburgh Pirates	
Leroy Reams	May 7, 1969	May 7, 1969	Pinch hitter	Philadelphia Phillies	
Jeff Reardon	August 25, 1979	May 4, 1994	Pitcher	New York Mets, Montreal Expos, Minnesota Twins, Boston Red Sox, Atlanta Braves, Cincinnati Reds, New York Yankees	
Jeremiah Reardon	July 17, 1886	August 31, 1886	Pitcher	St. Louis Maroons, Cincinnati Red Stockings (AA)	
Phil Reardon	September 19, 1906	September 20, 1906	Outfielder	Brooklyn Superbas	
Art Rebel	April 19, 1938	September 30, 1945	Outfielder	Philadelphia Phillies, St. Louis Cardinals	
Frank Reberger	June 6, 1968	September 24, 1972	Pitcher	Chicago Cubs, San Diego Padres, San Francisco Giants	
Jeff Reboulet	May 12, 1992	September 27, 2003	Utility player	Minnesota Twins, Baltimore Orioles, Kansas City Royals, Los Angeles Dodgers, Pittsburgh Pirates	
John Reccius	May 2, 1882	July 11, 1883	Outfielder	Louisville Eclipse	
Phil Reccius	September 25, 1882	July 5, 1890	Third baseman	Louisville Eclipse/Colonels, Cleveland Blues, Rochester Broncos	
Anthony Recker	August 25, 2011		Catcher	Oakland Athletics	
Josh Reddick	July 31, 2009		Outfielder	Boston Red Sox	
Phil Redding	September 14, 1912	April 24, 1913	Pitcher	St. Louis Cardinals	
Tim Redding	June 24, 2001		Pitcher	Houston Astros, San Diego Padres, New York Yankees, Washington Nationals, New York Mets	
Johnny Reder	April 16, 1932	June 12, 1932	First baseman	Boston Red Sox	
Buck Redfern	April 11, 1928	October 6, 1929	Second baseman	Chicago White Sox	
Pete Redfern	May 15, 1976	September 5, 1982	Pitcher	Minnesota Twins	
Joe Redfield	June 4, 1988	July 15, 1991	Third baseman	California Angels, Pittsburgh Pirates	
Mark Redman	July 24, 1999	July 13, 2008	Pitcher	Minnesota Twins, Detroit Tigers, Florida Marlins, Oakland Athletics, Pittsburgh Pirates, Kansas City Royals, Atlanta Braves, Colorado Rockies	
Prentice Redman	August 24, 2003	September 28, 2003	Outfielder	New York Mets	
Tike Redman	June 30, 2000		Outfielder	Pittsburgh Pirates, Baltimore Orioles	
Glenn Redmon	September 8, 1974	October 2, 1974	Second baseman	San Francisco Giants	
Billy Redmond	May 4, 1875	September 14, 1878	Shortstop	St. Louis Red Stockings, Cincinnati Reds (1876–1880), Milwaukee Grays	
Harry Redmond	September 7, 1909	September 14, 1909	Second baseman	Brooklyn Superbas	
Jack Redmond	April 22, 1935	August 31, 1935	Catcher	Washington Senators	
Mike Redmond	May 31, 1998		Catcher	Florida Marlins, Minnesota Twins, Cleveland Indians	
Wayne Redmond	September 7, 1965	September 18, 1969	Outfielder	Detroit Tigers	
Gary Redus	September 7, 1982	July 23, 1994	Outfielder	Cincinnati Reds, Philadelphia Phillies, Chicago White Sox, Pittsburgh Pirates, Texas Rangers	
Bob Reece	April 22, 1978	September 16, 1978	Catcher	Montreal Expos	
Addison Reed	September 4, 2011		Pitcher	Chicago White Sox	
Billy Reed	April 15, 1952	May 6, 1952	Second baseman	Boston Braves	
Bob Reed	September 5, 1969	September 30, 1970	Pitcher	Detroit Tigers	
Darren Reed	May 1, 1990	September 30, 1992	Outfielder	New York Mets, Montreal Expos, Minnesota Twins	
Eric Reed	April 3, 2006	July 18, 2007	Outfielder	Florida Marlins	
Howie Reed	September 13, 1958	September 17, 1971	Pitcher	Kansas City Athletics, Los Angeles Dodgers, California Angels, Houston Astros, Montreal Expos	
Jack Reed	April 23, 1961	September 28, 1963	Outfielder	New York Yankees	
Jeff Reed	April 5, 1984	October 1, 2000	Catcher	Minnesota Twins, Montreal Expos, Cincinnati Reds, San Francisco Giants, Colorado Rockies, Chicago Cubs	
Jeremy Reed	September 8, 2004		Outfielder	Seattle Mariners, New York Mets, Toronto Blue Jays, Milwaukee Brewers	
Jerry Reed	September 11, 1981	August 8, 1990	Pitcher	Philadelphia Phillies, Cleveland Indians, Seattle Mariners, Boston Red Sox	
Jody Reed	September 12, 1987	August 22, 1997	Second baseman	Boston Red Sox, Los Angeles Dodgers, Milwaukee Brewers, San Diego Padres, Detroit Tigers	
Keith Reed	May 11, 2005	May 18, 2005	Outfielder	Baltimore Orioles	
Milt Reed	September 9, 1911	April 23, 1915	Shortstop	St. Louis Cardinals, Philadelphia Phillies, Brooklyn Tip-Tops	
Rick Reed	August 8, 1988	September 26, 2003	Pitcher	Pittsburgh Pirates, Kansas City Royals, Texas Rangers, Cincinnati Reds, New York Mets, Minnesota Twins	
Ron Reed	September 26, 1966	September 29, 1984	Pitcher	Atlanta Braves, St. Louis Cardinals, Philadelphia Phillies, Chicago White Sox	
Steve Reed	August 30, 1992	July 5, 2005	Pitcher	San Francisco Giants, Colorado Rockies, Cleveland Indians, Atlanta Braves, San Diego Padres, New York Mets, Baltimore Orioles	
Ted Reed	September 10, 1915	September 27, 1915	Third baseman	Newark Peppers	
Bill Reeder	April 23, 1949	September 22, 1949	Pitcher	St. Louis Cardinals	
Icicle Reeder	June 24, 1884	August 5, 1884	Outfielder	Cincinnati Red Stockings (AA), Washington Nationals (UA)	
Nick Reeder	April 11, 1891	April 11, 1891	Third baseman	Louisville Colonels	
Stan Rees	June 12, 1918	July 19, 1918	Pitcher	Washington Senators	
Jimmie Reese	April 19, 1930	September 25, 1932	Second baseman	New York Yankees, St. Louis Cardinals	
Kevin Reese	June 26, 2005	July 4, 2006	Outfielder	New York Yankees	
Pee Wee Reese β	April 23, 1940	September 26, 1958	Shortstop	Brooklyn/Los Angeles Dodgers	
Andy Reese	April 15, 1927	August 24, 1930	Outfielder	New York Giants	
Pokey Reese	April 1, 1997	October 3, 2004	Second baseman	Cincinnati Reds, Pittsburgh Pirates, Cincinnati Reds	
Rich Reese	September 4, 1964	September 29, 1973	First baseman	Minnesota Twins, Detroit Tigers	
Bobby Reeves	June 9, 1926	September 13, 1931	Utility infielder	Washington Senators, Boston Red Sox	
Rudy Regalado	April 13, 1954	June 1, 1956	Third baseman	Cleveland Indians	
Bill Regan	June 2, 1926	June 14, 1931	Second baseman	Boston Red Sox, Pittsburgh Pirates	
Joe Regan	September 21, 1898	September 22, 1898	Outfielder	New York Giants	
Mike Regan	May 13, 1917	May 6, 1919	Pitcher	Cincinnati Reds	
Phil Regan	July 19, 1960	July 15, 1972	Pitcher	Detroit Tigers, Los Angeles Dodgers, Chicago Cubs, Chicago White Sox	
Nick Regilio	July 9, 2004	June 8, 2005	Pitcher	Texas Rangers	
Steven Register	August 4, 2008		Pitcher	Colorado Rockies, Philadelphia Phillies	
Tony Rego	June 21, 1924	September 23, 1925	Catcher	St. Louis Browns	
Wally Rehg	April 14, 1912	May 10, 1919	Outfielder	Pittsburgh Pirates, Boston Red Sox, Boston Braves, Cincinnati Reds	
Frank Reiber	April 13, 1933	September 27, 1936	Catcher	Detroit Tigers	
Herman Reich	May 3, 1949	October 2, 1949	First baseman	Cleveland Indians, Washington Senators, Chicago Cubs	
Rick Reichardt	September 1, 1964	April 9, 1974	Outfielder	Los Angeles/California Angels, Washington Senators (1961–1971), Chicago White Sox, Kansas City Royals	
Dan Reichert	July 16, 1999	September 25, 2003	Pitcher	Kansas City Royals, Toronto Blue Jays	
Dick Reichle	September 19, 1922	October 7, 1923	Outfielder	Boston Red Sox	
Billy Reid	May 1, 1883	October 15, 1884	Second baseman	Baltimore Orioles (19th century), Pittsburgh Alleghenys	
Earl Reid	May 6, 1946	May 13, 1946	Pitcher	Boston Braves	
Hugh Reid	August 26, 1874	August 26, 1874	Outfielder	Baltimore Canaries	
Jessie Reid	September 7, 1987	April 11, 1988	Outfielder	San Francisco Giants	
Scott Reid	September 10, 1969	September 29, 1970	Outfielder	Philadelphia Phillies	
Bill Reidy	July 21, 1896	July 1, 1904	Pitcher	New York Giants, Brooklyn Dodgers, Milwaukee Brewers (1901), St. Louis Browns,	
Charlie Reilley	May 1, 1879	April 26, 1884	Catcher	Troy Trojans, Cincinnati Reds (1876–1880), Detroit Wolverines, Worcester Ruby Legs, Providence Grays, Boston Reds (UA)	
Duke Reilley	August 28, 1909	September 28, 1909	Outfielder	Cleveland Naps	
Arch Reilly	June 1, 1917	June 1, 1917	Third baseman	Pittsburgh Pirates	
Barney Reilly	July 2, 1909	September 5, 1909	Second baseman	Chicago White Sox	
Charlie Reilly	October 9, 1889	September 27, 1897	Third baseman	Columbus Solons, Pittsburgh Pirates, Philadelphia Phillies, Washington Senators (1891–99)	
Hal Reilly	June 19, 1919	June 19, 1919	Outfielder	Chicago Cubs	
Joe Reilly	June 8, 1885	June 19, 1885	Second baseman	New York Metropolitans	
John Reilly	May 18, 1880	October 3, 1891	First baseman	Cincinnati Reds (1876–1880), Cincinnati Red Stockings (AA), Cincinnati Reds	
Josh Reilly	May 2, 1896	May 28, 1896	Second baseman	Chicago Colts	
Tom Reilly	July 27, 1908	July 3, 1914	Shortstop	St. Louis Cardinals, Cleveland Indians	
Kevin Reimer	September 13, 1988	September 27, 1993	Outfielder	Texas Rangers, Milwaukee Brewers	
Nolan Reimold	May 14, 2009		Outfielder	Baltimore Orioles	
Mike Reinbach	April 7, 1974	June 1, 1974	Outfielder	Baltimore Orioles	
Wally Reinecker	September 17, 1915	September 18, 1915	Third baseman	Baltimore Terrapins	
Chad Reineke	August 16, 2008		Pitcher	San Diego Padres, Oakland Athletics, Cincinnati Reds	
Art Reinhart	April 26, 1919	September 15, 1928	Pitcher	St. Louis Cardinals	
Art Reinholz	September 27, 1928	September 29, 1928	Third baseman	Cleveland Indians	
Charlie Reipschlager	May 2, 1883	September 6, 1887	Catcher	New York Metropolitans, Cleveland Blues (AA)	
Bobby Reis	September 19, 1931	September 21, 1938	Utility player	Brooklyn Dodgers, Boston Bees	
Jack Reis	September 9, 1911	October 4, 1911	Pitcher	St. Louis Cardinals	
Laurie Reis	October 1, 1877	September 3, 1878	Pitcher	Chicago White Stockings	
Tommy Reis	April 27, 1938	June 25, 1938	Pitcher	Philadelphia Phillies, Boston Bees	
Pete Reiser	July 23, 1940	July 5, 1952	Outfielder	Brooklyn Dodgers, Boston Braves, Pittsburgh Pirates, Cleveland Indians	
Bugs Reisigl	September 20, 1911	September 28, 1911	Pitcher	Cleveland Naps	
Charlie Reising	July 19, 1884	July 20, 1884	Outfielder	Indianapolis Hoosiers (AA)	
Doc Reisling	September 10, 1904	October 5, 1910	Pitcher	Brooklyn Superbas, Washington Senators	
Al Reiss	June 22, 1932	August 13, 1932	Shortstop	Philadelphia Athletics	
Brian Reith	May 16, 2001	June 14, 2004	Pitcher	Cincinnati Reds	
Chris Reitsma	April 4, 2001	July 29, 2007	Pitcher	Cincinnati Reds, Atlanta Braves, Seattle Mariners	
Heinie Reitz	April 27, 1893	June 3, 1899	Second baseman	Baltimore Orioles (19th century), Washington Senators (1891–99), Pittsburgh Pirates	
Ken Reitz	September 5, 1972	June 3, 1982	Third baseman	St. Louis Cardinals, San Francisco Giants, Chicago Cubs, Pittsburgh Pirates	
Bryan Rekar	July 19, 1995	April 28, 2002	Pitcher	Colorado Rockies, Tampa Bay Devil Rays, Kansas City Royals	
Desi Relaford	August 1, 1996	July 28, 2007	Shortstop	Philadelphia Phillies, San Diego Padres, New York Mets, Seattle Mariners, Kansas City Royals, Colorado Rockies, Texas Rangers	
Butch Rementer	October 8, 1904	October 8, 1904	Catcher	Philadelphia Phillies	
Mike Remlinger	June 15, 1991	June 22, 2006	Pitcher	San Francisco Giants, New York Mets, Cincinnati Reds, Atlanta Braves, Chicago Cubs, Boston Red Sox	
Win Remmerswaal	August 3, 1979	October 5, 1980	Pitcher	Boston Red Sox	
Alex Remneas	April 15, 1912	April 20, 1915	Pitcher	Detroit Tigers, St. Louis Browns	
Jack Remsen	May 2, 1872	October 15, 1884	Outfielder	Brooklyn Atlantics, New York Mutuals, Hartford Dark Blues, St. Louis Brown Stockings, Chicago White Stockings, Cleveland Blues (NL)	
Jerry Remy	April 7, 1975	May 18, 1984	Second baseman	California Angels, Boston Red Sox	
Erwin Renfer	September 18, 1913	September 18, 1913	Pitcher	Detroit Tigers	
Laddie Renfroe	July 3, 1991	July 17, 1991	Pitcher	Chicago Cubs	
Marshall Renfroe	September 27, 1959	September 27, 1959	Pitcher	San Francisco Giants	
Rick Renick	July 11, 1968	October 2, 1972	Utility player	Minnesota Twins	
Hal Reniff	June 8, 1961	September 3, 1967	Pitcher	New York Yankees, New York Mets	
Jim Reninger	September 17, 1938	August 30, 1939	Pitcher	Philadelphia Athletics	
Steve Renko	June 27, 1969	August 28, 1983	Pitcher	Montreal Expos, Chicago Cubs, Chicago White Sox, Oakland Athletics, Boston Red Sox, California Angels, Kansas City Royals	
Bill Renna	April 14, 1953	May 20, 1959	Outfielder	New York Yankees, Philadelphia/Kansas City Athletics, Boston Red Sox	
Tony Rensa	May 5, 1930	August 27, 1939	Catcher	Detroit Tigers, Philadelphia Phillies, New York Yankees, Chicago White Sox	
Édgar Rentería	May 10, 1996		Shortstop	Florida Marlins, St. Louis Cardinals, Boston Red Sox, Atlanta Braves, Detroit Tigers, San Francisco Giants, Cincinnati Reds	
Rick Rentería	September 14, 1986	August 11, 1994	Infielder	Pittsburgh Pirates, Seattle Mariners, Florida Marlins	
Bob Repass	September 18, 1939	August 10, 1942	Utility infielder	St. Louis Cardinals, Washington Senators	
Jason Repko	April 6, 2005		Outfielder	Los Angeles Dodgers, Minnesota Twins	
Andy Replogle	April 11, 1978	September 30, 1979	Pitcher	Milwaukee Brewers	
Roger Repoz	September 11, 1964	June 9, 1972	Outfielder	New York Yankees, Kansas City Athletics, California Angels	
Rip Repulski	April 14, 1953	June 18, 1961	Outfielder	St. Louis Cardinals, Philadelphia Phillies, Los Angeles Dodgers, Boston Red Sox	
Xavier Rescigno	April 22, 1943	September 30, 1945	Pitcher	Pittsburgh Pirates	
Chris Resop	June 28, 2005		Pitcher	Florida Marlins, Los Angeles Angels of Anaheim, Atlanta Braves	
Larry Ressler	April 28, 1875	July 5, 1875	Outfielder	Washington Nationals (NA)	
Dino Restelli	June 14, 1949	June 12, 1951	Outfielder	Pittsburgh Pirates	
Michael Restovich	September 18, 2002		Outfielder	Minnesota Twins, Colorado Rockies, Pittsburgh Pirates, Chicago Cubs, Washington Nationals	
Merv Rettenmund	April 14, 1968	June 22, 1980	Outfielder	Baltimore Orioles, Cincinnati Reds, San Diego Padres, California Angels	
George Rettger	August 13, 1891	July 17, 1892	Pitcher	St. Louis Browns (AA), Cleveland Spiders, Cincinnati Reds	
Otto Rettig	July 19, 1922	August 5, 1922	Pitcher	Philadelphia Athletics	
Ken Retzer	September 9, 1961	October 3, 1964	Catcher	Washington Senators (1961–1971)	
Ed Reulbach	May 16, 1905	July 13, 1917	Pitcher	Chicago Cubs, Brooklyn Superbas/Robins, Newark Peppers, Boston Braves	
Paul Reuschel	July 25, 1975	September 28, 1979	Pitcher	Chicago Cubs, Cleveland Indians	
Rick Reuschel	June 19, 1972	April 22, 1991	Pitcher	Chicago Cubs, New York Yankees, Pittsburgh Pirates, San Francisco Giants	
Jerry Reuss	September 27, 1969	October 3, 1990	Pitcher	St. Louis Cardinals, Houston Astros, Pittsburgh Pirates, Los Angeles Dodgers, Cincinnati Reds, California Angels, Chicago White Sox, Milwaukee Brewers	
Todd Revenig	August 24, 1992	August 30, 1992	Pitcher	Oakland Athletics	
Ben Revere	September 7, 2010		Outfielder	Minnesota Twins	
Dave Revering	April 8, 1978	October 1, 1982	First baseman	Oakland Athletics, New York Yankees, Toronto Blue Jays, Seattle Mariners	
Henry Reville	October 14, 1874	October 14, 1874	Outfielder	Baltimore Canaries	
William Rexter	September 25, 1875	September 25, 1875	Outfielder	Brooklyn Atlantics	
Al Reyes	April 27, 1995	August 5, 2008	Pitcher	Milwaukee Brewers, Baltimore Orioles, Los Angeles Dodgers, Pittsburgh Pirates, New York Yankees, St. Louis Cardinals, Tampa Bay Devil Rays/Rays	
Anthony Reyes	August 9, 2005		Pitcher	St. Louis Cardinals, Cleveland Indians	
Argenis Reyes	July 3, 2008		Second baseman	New York Mets	
Carlos Reyes	April 7, 1994	September 26, 2003	Pitcher	Oakland Athletics, San Diego Padres, Boston Red Sox, Philadelphia Phillies, Tampa Bay Devil Rays	
Dennys Reyes	July 13, 1997		Pitcher	Los Angeles Dodgers, Cincinnati Reds, Colorado Rockies, Texas Rangers, Pittsburgh Pirates, Arizona Diamondbacks, Kansas City Royals, San Diego Padres, Minnesota Twins, St. Louis Cardinals, Boston Red Sox	
Gilberto Reyes	June 11, 1983	October 6, 1991	Catcher	Los Angeles Dodgers, Montreal Expos	
Jo-Jo Reyes	July 7, 2007		Pitcher	Atlanta Braves, Toronto Blue Jays, Baltimore Orioles	
José Reyes (SS)	June 10, 2003		Shortstop	New York Mets, Miami Marlins, Toronto Blue Jays	
José Reyes (C)	September 13, 2006	September 30, 2006	Catcher	Chicago Cubs	
Nap Reyes	May 19, 1943	April 27, 1950	Third baseman	New York Giants	
René Reyes	July 22, 2003	June 2, 2004	Outfielder	Colorado Rockies	
Allie Reynolds	September 17, 1942	September 25, 1954	Pitcher	Cleveland Indians, New York Yankees	
Archie Reynolds	August 15, 1968	August 4, 1972	Pitcher	Chicago Cubs, California Angels, Milwaukee Brewers	
Bill Reynolds	September 15, 1913	May 8, 1914	Catcher	New York Yankees	
Bob Reynolds	September 19, 1969	September 21, 1975	Pitcher	Montreal Expos, St. Louis Cardinals, Milwaukee Brewers, Baltimore Orioles, Detroit Tigers, Cleveland Indians	
Carl Reynolds	September 1, 1927	October 1, 1939	Outfielder	Chicago White Sox, Washington Senators, St. Louis Browns, Boston Red Sox, Chicago Cubs	
Charlie Reynolds (P)	May 18, 1882	May 19, 1882	Pitcher	Philadelphia Athletics (AA)	
Charlie Reynolds (C)	May 8, 1889	August 19, 1889	Catcher	Kansas City Cowboys (AA), Brooklyn Bridegrooms	
Craig Reynolds	August 1, 1975	September 27, 1989	Shortstop	Pittsburgh Pirates, Seattle Mariners, Houston Astros	
Danny Reynolds	May 26, 1945	September 25, 1945	Utility infielder	Chicago White Sox	
Don Reynolds	April 7, 1978	September 30, 1979	Outfielder	San Diego Padres	
Greg Reynolds	May 11, 2008		Pitcher	Colorado Rockies	
Harold Reynolds	September 2, 1983	August 7, 1994	Second baseman	Seattle Mariners, Baltimore Orioles, California Angels	
Ken Reynolds	September 5, 1970	July 30, 1976	Pitcher	Philadelphia Phillies, Milwaukee Brewers, St. Louis Cardinals, San Diego Padres	
Mark Reynolds	May 16, 2007		Third baseman	Arizona Diamondbacks, Baltimore Orioles	
Matt Reynolds	August 19, 2010		Pitcher	Colorado Rockies	
R. J. Reynolds	September 1, 1983	October 2, 1990	Outfielder	Los Angeles Dodgers, Pittsburgh Pirates	
Ronn Reynolds	September 29, 1982	July 5, 1990	Catcher	New York Mets, Philadelphia Phillies, Houston Astros, San Diego Padres	
Ross Reynolds	May 2, 1914	May 1, 1915	Pitcher	Detroit Tigers	
Shane Reynolds	July 20, 1992	June 28, 2004	Pitcher	Houston Astros, Atlanta Braves, Arizona Diamondbacks	
Tommie Reynolds	September 5, 1963	October 1, 1972	Outfielder	Kansas City Athletics, New York Mets, Oakland Athletics, California Angels, Milwaukee Brewers	
Armando Reynoso	August 11, 1991	September 29, 2002	Pitcher	Atlanta Braves, Colorado Rockies, New York Mets, Arizona Diamondbacks	
Bobby Rhawn	September 17, 1947	July 31, 1949	Third baseman	New York Giants, Pittsburgh Pirates, Chicago White Sox	
Cy Rheam	May 20, 1914	October 3, 1915	First baseman	Pittsburgh Burghers	
John Rheinecker	April 22, 2006	September 28, 2007	Pitcher	Texas Rangers	
Flint Rhem	September 6, 1924	August 26, 1936	Pitcher	St. Louis Cardinals, Philadelphia Phillies, Boston Braves	
Billy Rhiel	April 20, 1929	July 9, 1933	Utility infielder	Brooklyn Robins, Boston Braves, Detroit Tigers	
Billy Rhines	April 22, 1890	June 22, 1899	Pitcher	Cincinnati Reds, Louisville Colonels, Pittsburgh Pirates	
Bob Rhoads	April 12, 1902	August 19, 1909	Pitcher	Chicago Orphans, Cleveland Naps	
Rick Rhoden	July 5, 1974	September 29, 1989	Pitcher	Los Angeles Dogers, Pittsburgh Pirates, New York Yankees, Houston Astros	
Arthur Rhodes	August 21, 1991		Pitcher	Baltimore Orioles, Seattle Mariners, Oakland Athletics, Cleveland Indians, Philadelphia Phillies, Florida Marlins, Cincinnati Reds, Texas Rangers, St. Louis Cardinals	
Charlie Rhodes	July 26, 1906	June 14, 1909	Pitcher	St. Louis Cardinals, Cincinnati Reds	
Dusty Rhodes	July 15, 1952	September 27, 1959	Outfielder	New York Giants	
Gordon Rhodes	April 29, 1929	September 2, 1936	Pitcher	New York Yankees, Boston Red Sox, Philadelphia Athletics	
Tuffy Rhodes	August 7, 1990	June 8, 1995	Outfielder	Houston Astros, Chicago Cubs, Boston Red Sox	
Kevin Rhomberg	September 1, 1982	June 5, 1984	Outfielder	Cleveland Indians	
Will Rhymes	July 25, 2010		Second baseman	Detroit Tigers	
Hal Rhyne	April 18, 1926	October 1, 1933	Shortstop	Pittsburgh Pirates, Boston Red Sox, Chicago White Sox	
Dennis Ribant	August 9, 1964	September 27, 1969	Pitcher	New York Mets, Pittsburgh Pirates, Detroit Tigers, Chicago White Sox, St. Louis Cardinals, Cincinnati Reds	
Frank Riccelli	September 11, 1976	June 17, 1979	Pitcher	San Francisco Giants, Houston Astros	
Chuck Ricci	September 8, 1995	October 1, 1995	Pitcher	Philadelphia Phillies	
Bob Rice	September 1, 1926	September 26, 1926	Third baseman	Philadelphia Phillies	
Del Rice	May 2, 1945	August 31, 1961	Catcher	St. Louis Cardinals, Milwaukee Braves, Chicago Cubs, Baltimore Orioles, Los Angeles Angels	
Hal Rice	April 29, 1948	September 19, 1954	Outfielder	St. Louis Cardinals, Pittsburgh Pirates, Chicago Cubs	
Harry Rice	April 18, 1923	October 1, 1933	Outfielder	St. Louis Browns, Detroit Tigers, New York Yankees, Washington Senators, Cincinnati Reds	
Jim Rice β	August 19, 1974	August 3, 1989	Outfielder	Boston Red Sox	
Len Rice	April 26, 1944	September 29, 1945	Catcher	Cincinnati Reds, Chicago Cubs	
Pat Rice	May 18, 1991	June 16, 1991	Pitcher	Seattle Mariners	
Sam Rice β	August 7, 1915	September 18, 1934	Outfielder	Washington Senators, Cleveland Indians	
Woody Rich	April 22, 1939	September 16, 1944	Pitcher	Boston Red Sox, Boston Braves	
Danny Richar	July 28, 2007		Second baseman	Chicago White Sox, Cincinnati Reds	
Chris Richard	July 17, 2000		Outfielder	St. Louis Cardinals, Baltimore Orioles, Colorado Rockies, Tampa Bay Rays	
Clayton Richard	July 23, 2008		Pitcher	Chicago White Sox, San Diego Padres	
J. R. Richard	September 5, 1971	July 14, 1980	Pitcher	Houston Astros	
Lee Richard	April 7, 1971	October 3, 1976	Shortstop	Chicago White Sox, St. Louis Cardinals	
Duane Richards	September 25, 1960	October 1, 1960	Pitcher	Cincinnati Reds	
Fred Richards	September 15, 1951	September 30, 1951	First baseman	Chicago Cubs	
Garrett Richards	August 10, 2011		Pitcher	Los Angeles Angels of Anaheim	
Gene Richards	April 6, 1977	September 30, 1984	Outfielder	San Diego Padres, San Francisco Giants	
Paul Richards	April 17, 1932	September 22, 1946	Catcher	Brooklyn Dodgers, New York Giants, Philadelphia Athletics, Detroit Tigers	
Rusty Richards	September 20, 1989	July 6, 1990	Pitcher	Atlanta Braves	
Antoan Richardson	September 4, 2011		Outfielder	Atlanta Braves	
Art Richardson	July 10, 1884	July 10, 1884	Second baseman	Chicago Browns/Pittsburgh Stogies	
Bill Richardson	September 20, 1901	October 6, 1901	First baseman	St. Louis Cardinals	
Bobby Richardson	August 5, 1955	October 2, 1966	Second baseman	New York Yankees	
Danny Richardson	May 22, 1884	September 24, 1894	Second baseman	New York Gothams/Giants, New York Giants (PL), Washington Senators (1891–99), Brooklyn Grooms, Louisville Colonels	
Dustin Richardson	September 28, 2009		Pitcher	Boston Red Sox	
Gordie Richardson	July 26, 1964	June 5, 1966	Pitcher	St. Louis Cardinals, New York Mets	
Hardy Richardson	May 1, 1879	September 10, 1892	Utility player	Buffalo Bisons (NL), Detroit Wolverines, Boston Beaneaters, Boston Reds (1890–91), Washington Senators (1891–99), New York Giants	
Jack Richardson	September 17, 1915	April 13, 1916	Pitcher	Philadelphia Athletics	
Jeff Richardson (IF)	July 14, 1989	May 28, 1993	Shortstop	Cincinnati Reds, Pittsburgh Pirates, Boston Red Sox	
Jeff Richardson (P)	September 19, 1990	September 19, 1990	Pitcher	California Angels	
Ken Richardson	April 14, 1942	May 2, 1946	Second baseman	Philadelphia Athletics, Philadelphia Phillies	
Kevin Richardson	August 17, 2009		Catcher	Texas Rangers	
Nolen Richardson	April 16, 1929	April 17, 1939	Third baseman	Detroit Tigers, New York Yankees, Cincinnati Reds	
Tom Richardson	August 2, 1917	August 2, 1917	Pinch hitter	St. Louis Browns	
Mike Richardt	August 30, 1980	September 30, 1984	Second baseman	Texas Rangers, Houston Astros	
Lance Richbourg	July 4, 1921	September 25, 1932	Outfielder	Philadelphia Phillies, Washington Senators, Boston Braves, Chicago Cubs	
Pete Richert	April 12, 1962	September 2, 1974	Pitcher	Los Angeles Dodgers, Washington Senators (1961–1971), Baltimore Orioles, St. Louis Cardinals, Philadelphia Phillies	
Lew Richie	May 8, 1906	August 8, 1913	Pitcher	Philadelphia Phillies, Boston Braves, Chicago Cubs	
Rob Richie	August 19, 1989	September 26, 1989	Outfielder	Detroit Tigers	
Beryl Richmond	April 21, 1933	September 29, 1934	Pitcher	Chicago Cubs, Cincinnati Reds	
Don Richmond	September 16, 1941	May 13, 1951	Third baseman	Philadelphia Athletics, St. Louis Cardinals	
John Richmond	April 22, 1875	July 10, 1885	Shortstop	Philadelphia Athletics (1860–76), Syracuse Stars (NL)	
Lee Richmond	September 27, 1879	October 4, 1886	Pitcher	Boston Red Caps, Worcester Ruby Legs, Providence Grays, Cincinnati Red Stockings (AA)	
Ray Richmond	September 25, 1920	June 26, 1921	Pitcher	St. Louis Browns	
Scott Richmond	July 30, 2008		Pitcher	Toronto Blue Jays	
Al Richter	September 23, 1951	April 21, 1953	Shortstop	Boston Red Sox	
John Richter	October 6, 1898	October 9, 1898	Third baseman	Louisville Colonels	
Reggie Richter	May 30, 1911	September 26, 1911	Pitcher	Chicago Cubs	
Joe Rickert	October 12, 1898	October 5, 1901	Outfielder	Pittsburgh Pirates, Boston Beaneaters	
Marv Rickert	September 10, 1942	September 26, 1950	Outfielder	Chicago Cubs, Boston Braves, Pittsburgh Pirates, Chicago White Sox	
Dave Ricketts	September 25, 1963	July 30, 1970	Catcher	St. Louis Cardinals, Pittsburgh Pirates	
Dick Ricketts	June 14, 1959	June 27, 1959	Pitcher	St. Louis Cardinals	
Branch Rickey β	June 16, 1905	August 25, 1914	Catcher	St. Louis Browns, New York Highlanders	
Chris Rickley	June 9, 1884	June 21, 1884	Shortstop	Philadelphia Keystones	
John Ricks	September 21, 1891	July 4, 1894	Third baseman	St. Louis Browns (AA)/Cardinals	
Art Rico	July 31, 1916	September 3, 1917	Catcher	Boston Braves	
Fred Rico	September 1, 1969	October 2, 1969	Outfielder	Kansas City Royals	
Harry Riconda	April 19, 1923	April 18, 1930	Third baseman	Philadelphia Athletics, Boston Braves, Brooklyn Robins, Pittsburgh Pirates	
Elmer Riddle	October 1, 1939	August 3, 1949	Pitcher	Cincinnati Reds, Pittsburgh Pirates	
John Riddle	September 18, 1889	October 11, 1890	Catcher	Washington Nationals (1886–1889), Philadelphia Athletics (AA)	
Johnny Riddle	April 17, 1930	September 11, 1948	Catcher	Chicago White Sox, Washington Senators, Boston Braves, Cincinnati Reds, Pittsburgh Pirates	
Denny Riddleberger	September 15, 1970	September 24, 1972	Pitcher	Washington Senators (1961–1971), Cleveland Indians	
Dorsey Riddlemoser	August 22, 1899	August 22, 1899	Pitcher	Washington Senators (1891–99)	
Jack Ridgway	May 20, 1914	June 16, 1914	Pitcher	Baltimore Terrapins	
Jeff Ridgway	September 17, 2007		Pitcher	Tampa Bay Devil Rays, Atlanta Braves	
Steve Ridzik	September 4, 1950	May 10, 1966	Pitcher	Philadelphia Phillies, Cincinnati Reds, New York Giants, Cleveland Indians, Washington Senators (1961–1971)	
Hank Riebe	August 26, 1942	September 17, 1949	Catcher	Detroit Tigers	
John Riedling	August 30, 2000	August 28, 2005	Pitcher	Cincinnati Reds, Florida Marlins	
Elmer Rieger	April 20, 1910	July 20, 1910	Pitcher	St. Louis Cardinals	
Nikco Riesgo	April 20, 1991	April 26, 1991	Outfielder	Montreal Expos	
Brad Rigby	June 28, 1997	June 24, 2000	Pitcher	Oakland Athletics, Kansas City Royals, Montreal Expos	
Paul Rigdon	May 21, 2000	July 1, 2001	Pitcher	Cleveland Indians, Milwaukee Brewers	
Jerrod Riggan	August 29, 2000	May 15, 2003	Pitcher	New York Mets, Cleveland Indians	
Shawn Riggans	September 5, 2006		Catcher	Tampa Bay Devil Rays/Rays	
Joe Riggert	May 12, 1911	July 21, 1919	Outfielder	Boston Red Sox, Brooklyn Robins, Boston Braves	
Adam Riggs	August 7, 1997	October 3, 2004	Utility player	Los Angeles Dodgers, San Diego Padres, Anaheim Angels	
Lew Riggs	April 28, 1934	April 16, 1946	Third baseman	St. Louis Cardinals, Cincinnati Reds, Brooklyn Dodgers	
Dave Righetti	September 16, 1979	September 18, 1995	Pitcher	New York Yankees, San Francisco Giants, Oakland Athletics, Toronto Blue Jays, Chicago White Sox	
Ron Rightnowar	May 20, 1995	September 26, 1995	Pitcher	Milwaukee Brewers	
Bill Rigney	April 16, 1946	September 12, 1953	Utility infielder	San Francisco Giants	
Johnny Rigney	April 21, 1937	July 4, 1947	Pitcher	Chicago White Sox	
Topper Rigney	April 12, 1922	August 26, 1927	Shortstop	Detroit Tigers, Boston Red Sox, Washington Senators	
José Rijo	April 5, 1984	September 28, 2002	Pitcher	New York Yankees, Oakland Athletics, Cincinnati Reds	
Culley Rikard	September 20, 1941	September 25, 1947	Outfielder	Pittsburgh Pirates	
Ernest Riles	May 14, 1985	October 3, 1993	Utility infielder	Milwaukee Brewers, San Francisco Giants, Oakland Athletics, Houston Astros, Boston Red Sox	
Billy Riley	May 4, 1875	September 30, 1879	Outfielder	Keokuk Westerns, Cleveland Blues (NL)	
George Riley	September 15, 1979	May 4, 1986	Pitcher	Chicago Cubs, San Francisco Giants, Montreal Expos	
Jim Riley (OF)	August 2, 1910	August 2, 1910	Outfielder	Boston Braves	
Jim Riley (2B)	July 3, 1921	October 7, 1923	Second baseman	St. Louis Browns, Washington Senators	
Lee Riley	April 19, 1944	April 30, 1944	Outfielder	Philadelphia Phillies	
Matt Riley	September 9, 1999	May 4, 2005	Pitcher	Baltimore Orioles, Texas Rangers	
Andy Rincon	September 15, 1980	May 22, 1982	Pitcher	St. Louis Cardinals	
Juan Rincón	June 7, 2001		Pitcher	Minnesota Twins, Cleveland Indians, Detroit Tigers, Colorado Rockies	
Ricardo Rincón	April 3, 1997		Pitcher	Pittsburgh Pirates, Cleveland Indians, Oakland Athletics, St. Louis Cardinals, New York Mets	
Jeff Rineer	September 30, 1979	September 30, 1979	Pitcher	Baltimore Orioles	
Jimmy Ring	April 13, 1917	September 26, 1928	Pitcher	Cincinnati Reds, Philadelphia Phillies, New York Giants, St. Louis Cardinals	
Royce Ring	April 29, 2005		Pitcher	New York Mets, San Diego Padres, Atlanta Braves, New York Yankees	
Frank Ringo	May 1, 1883	September 18, 1886	Catcher	Philadelphia Quakers, Philadelphia Athletics (AA), Detroit Wolverines, Pittsburgh Alleghenys, Kansas City Cowboys (NL)	
Bob Rinker	September 6, 1950	September 16, 1950	Catcher	Philadelphia Athletics	
Alex Ríos	May 27, 2004		Outfielder	Toronto Blue Jays, Chicago White Sox	
Armando Ríos	September 1, 1998	September 27, 2003	Outfielder	San Francisco Giants, Pittsburgh Pirates, Chicago White Sox	
Danny Rios	May 30, 1997	May 2, 1998	Pitcher	New York Yankees, Kansas City Royals	
Juan Ríos	April 9, 1969	October 2, 1969	Utility infielder	Kansas City Royals	
Billy Ripken	July 11, 1987	July 13, 1998	Second baseman	Baltimore Orioles, Texas Rangers, Cleveland Indians, Detroit Tigers	
Cal Ripken Jr. β	August 10, 1981	October 6, 2001	Shortstop	Baltimore Orioles	
Allen Ripley	April 10, 1978	September 24, 1982	Pitcher	Boston Red Sox, San Francisco Giants, Chicago Cubs	
Walt Ripley	August 17, 1935	September 11, 1935	Pitcher	Boston Red Sox	
Ray Rippelmeyer	April 14, 1962	July 1, 1962	Pitcher	Washington Senators (1961–1971)	
Charlie Ripple	September 25, 1944	June 28, 1946	Pitcher	Philadelphia Phillies	
Jimmy Ripple	April 20, 1936	September 12, 1943	Outfielder	New York Giants, Brooklyn Dodgers, Cincinnati Reds, Philadelphia Athletics	
Swede Risberg	April 11, 1917	September 27, 1920	Shortstop	Chicago White Sox	
Pop Rising	August 10, 1905	October 6, 1905	Outfielder	Boston Americans	
David Riske	August 14, 1999		Pitcher	Cleveland Indians, Boston Red Sox, Chicago White Sox, Kansas City Royals, Milwaukee Brewers	
Bill Risley	July 8, 1992	September 26, 1998	Pitcher	Montreal Expos, Seattle Mariners, Toronto Blue Jays	
Claude Ritchey	April 22, 1897	June 24, 1909	Second baseman	Cincinnati Reds, Louisville Colonels, Pittsburgh Pirates, Boston Doves	
Jay Ritchie	August 4, 1964	September 6, 1968	Pitcher	Boston Red Sox, Atlanta Braves, Cincinnati Reds	
Todd Ritchie	April 3, 1997	September 30, 2004	Pitcher	Minnesota Twins, Pittsburgh Pirates, Chicago White Sox, Milwaukee Brewers, Tampa Bay Devil Rays	
Wally Ritchie	May 1, 1987	July 28, 1992	Pitcher	Philadelphia Phillies	
Charlie Ritter	September 21, 1885	September 23, 1885	Second baseman	Buffalo Bisons (NL)	
Floyd Ritter	June 4, 1890	June 4, 1890	Catcher	Toledo Maumees	
Hank Ritter	August 3, 1912	September 27, 1916	Pitcher	Philadelphia Phillies, New York Giants	
Lew Ritter	September 10, 1902	August 29, 1908	Catcher	Brooklyn Superbas	
Reggie Ritter	May 17, 1986	October 2, 1987	Pitcher	Cleveland Indians	
Whitey Ritterson	May 2, 1876	August 9, 1876	Catcher	Philadelphia Athletics (1860–76)	
Jim Rittwage	September 7, 1970	September 30, 1970	Pitcher	Cleveland Indians	
Jim Ritz	July 20, 1894	July 20, 1894	Third baseman	Pittsburgh Pirates	
Kevin Ritz	July 15, 1989	May 16, 1998	Pitcher	Detroit Tigers, Colorado Rockies	
Luis Rivas	September 16, 2000		Second baseman	Minnesota Twins, Cleveland Indians, Pittsburgh Pirates	
Ben Rivera	April 9, 1992	July 31, 1994	Pitcher	Atlanta Braves, Philadelphia Phillies	
Bombo Rivera	April 17, 1975	October 3, 1982	Outfielder	Montreal Expos, Minnesota Twins, Kansas City Royals	
Carlos Rivera	June 22, 2003	May 6, 2004	First baseman	Pittsburgh Pirates	
Germán Rivera	September 2, 1983	September 28, 1985	Third baseman	Los Angeles Dodgers, Houston Astros	
Jim Rivera	April 15, 1952	September 30, 1961	Outfielder	St. Louis Browns, Chicago White Sox, Kansas City Athletics	
Juan Rivera	September 4, 2001		Outfielder	New York Yankees, Montreal Expos, Los Angeles Angels of Anaheim, Toronto Blue Jays, Los Angeles Dodgers	
Luis Rivera (SS)	August 3, 1986	August 27, 1998	Shortstop	Montreal Expos, Boston Red Sox, New York Mets, Houston Astros, Kansas City Royals	
Luis Rivera (P)	April 4, 2000	September 20, 2000	Pitcher	Atlanta Braves, Baltimore Orioles	
Mariano Rivera	May 23, 1995		Pitcher	New York Yankees	
Mike Rivera	September 18, 2001		Catcher	Detroit Tigers, San Diego Padres, Milwaukee Brewers, Florida Marlins	
René Rivera	September 22, 2004		Catcher	Seattle Mariners, Minnesota Twins	
Roberto Rivera	September 3, 1995	May 5, 1999	Pitcher	Chicago Cubs, San Diego Padres	
Rubén Rivera	September 3, 1995	May 28, 2003	Outfielder	New York Yankees, San Diego Padres, Cincinnati Reds, Texas Rangers, San Francisco Giants	
Saúl Rivera	May 25, 2006		Pitcher	Washington Nationals, Arizona Diamondbacks	
Mickey Rivers	August 4, 1970	September 30, 1984	Outfielder	California Angels, New York Yankees, Texas Rangers	
Tink Riviere	April 15, 1921	July 16, 1925	Pitcher	St. Louis Cardinals, Chicago White Sox	
Eppa Rixey β	June 21, 1912	August 5, 1933	Pitcher	Philadelphia Phillies, Cincinnati Reds	
Anthony Rizzo	June 9, 2011		First baseman	San Diego Padres	
Johnny Rizzo	April 19, 1938	September 25, 1942	Outfielder	Pittsburgh Pirates, Cincinnati Reds, Philadelphia Phillies, Brooklyn Dodgers	
Todd Rizzo	April 2, 1998	July 18, 1999	Pitcher	Chicago White Sox	
Phil Rizzuto β	April 14, 1941	August 16, 1956	Shortstop	New York Yankees	
