= Dave Robinson (baseball) =

American baseball player (born 1946)

- Outfielder
- Born: May 22, 1946 (age 80); Minneapolis, Minnesota, U.S.
- Batted: Switch Threw: Left

MLB debut
- September 10, 1970, for the San Diego Padres

Last MLB appearance
- April 21, 1971, for the San Diego Padres

MLB statistics
- Batting average: .273
- Home runs: 2
- Runs batted in: 6
- Stats at Baseball Reference

Teams
- San Diego Padres (1970–1971)

David Tanner Robinson (born May 22, 1946) is an American former professional baseball player. An outfielder, he played 22 games of Major League Baseball with the 1970–1971 San Diego Padres. He was a switch hitter who threw left-handed, stood 6 feet 1 inch (1.85 m) tall and weighed 186 pounds (84 kg). His brother, Bruce, is a former Major League catcher.

Dave Robinson graduated from La Jolla High School and San Diego State University. He was chosen in the seventh round of the 1968 Major League Baseball draft by his hometown Padres, one year before they began play in the National League. In his second pro campaign, 1970, Robinson batted .256 with 114 hits for the Salt Lake City Bees of the Triple-A Pacific Coast League. He then was recalled by the Padres after the September 1 roster expansion. On September 10, 1970, he played his first MLB game as a defensive replacement for Padre left fielder Al Ferrara; he played two errorless innings in the field, but did not come to bat.

Two days later, on September 12, he started in left field against the pennant-bound Cincinnati Reds at San Diego Stadium. Facing veteran Reds' starting pitcher Tony Cloninger, Robinson received a base on balls in his first Major League plate appearance. Then, leading off the fifth inning, in his second time at bat, Robinson singled to right field and stole second base — but was left stranded when the next three Padres made outs. The following inning, he singled to left field with two outs, again off Cloninger. In his last plate appearance, in the eighth inning, he was intentionally walked by relief pitcher Clay Carroll. In his first MLB start, Robinson had two hits in two at bats, two bases on balls, and a stolen base, for a 1.000 batting average, on-base percentage and slugging average.

Robinson would have three more multi-hit games before the end of the 1970 National League season, including back-to-back contests on September 25–26 against the San Francisco Giants at Candlestick Park, in which he hit his two MLB home runs off Skip Pitlock and future Hall of Famer Juan Marichal. All told, in his first brief big league trial, Robinson played in 15 games and had 12 hits (also including two doubles) and batted .316.

The following season, Robinson made the 1971 Padres out of spring training and appeared in seven games during the season's first ten days, all as a pinch hitter, drawing one base on balls and going hitless in six at bats. He spent the rest of the season at Triple-A, then left baseball after the season. He later became a teacher.

== After Retiring from MLB ==
Robinson was successful as a high school coach and in the Decathlon as a Masters Track and Field Athlete.
