= List of Major League Baseball players (Rj–Rz) =

The following is a list of Major League Baseball players, retired or active.

== Rl through Ry ==
Name	Debut	Final game	Position	Teams	Ref
Sendy Rleal	April 5, 2006	September 27, 2006	Pitcher	Baltimore Orioles	
Joe Roa	September 20, 1995	September 22, 2004	Pitcher	Cleveland Indians, San Francisco Giants, Philadelphia Phillies, Colorado Rockies, San Diego Padres, Minnesota Twins	
Jason Roach	June 14, 2003	July 8, 2003	Pitcher	New York Mets	
John Roach	May 14, 1887	May 14, 1887	Pitcher	New York Giants	
Mel Roach	July 31, 1953	September 28, 1962	Utility player	Milwaukee Braves, Chicago Cubs, Philadelphia Phillies	
Mike Roach	August 10, 1899	October 12, 1899	Catcher	Washington Senators (1891–99)	
Roxey Roach	May 2, 1910	September 30, 1915	Shortstop	New York Highlanders, Washington Senators, Buffalo Blues	
Skel Roach	August 9, 1899	August 9, 1899	Pitcher	Chicago Orphans	
Mike Roarke	April 19, 1961	October 3, 1964	Catcher	Detroit Tigers	
Fred Roat	May 10, 1890	August 18, 1892	Third baseman	Pittsburgh Alleghenys, Chicago Colts	
Bruce Robbins	July 28, 1979	September 23, 1980	Pitcher	Detroit Tigers	
Jake Robbins	September 20, 2004	September 24, 2004	Pitcher	Cleveland Indians	
Tony Robello	August 13, 1933	September 29, 1934	Second baseman	Cincinnati Reds	
Bert Roberge	May 28, 1979	October 4, 1986	Pitcher	Houston Astros, Chicago White Sox, Montreal Expos	
Skippy Roberge	July 18, 1941	June 15, 1946	Utility infielder	Boston Braves	
Chris Roberson	May 12, 2006		Outfielder	Philadelphia Phillies	
Kevin Roberson	July 15, 1993	May 28, 1996	Outfielder	Chicago Cubs, New York Mets	
Sid Roberson	May 20, 1995	September 29, 1995	Pitcher	Milwaukee Brewers	
Bip Roberts	April 7, 1986	September 27, 1998	Utility player	San Diego Padres, Cincinnati Reds, Kansas City Royals, Cleveland Indians, Detroit Tigers, Oakland Athletics	
Brian Roberts	June 14, 2001		Second baseman	Baltimore Orioles	
Curt Roberts	April 13, 1954	June 8, 1956	Second baseman	Pittsburgh Pirates	
Dale Roberts	September 9, 1967	September 16, 1967	Pitcher	New York Yankees	
Dave Roberts (1B)	September 5, 1962	May 11, 1966	First baseman	Houston Colt .45s, Pittsburgh Pirates	
Dave Roberts (P)	July 6, 1969	May 16, 1981	Pitcher	San Diego Padres, Houston Astros, Detroit Tigers, Chicago Cubs, San Francisco Giants, Pittsburgh Pirates, Seattle Mariners, New York Mets	
Dave Roberts (3B)	June 7, 1972	September 18, 1982	Third baseman	San Diego Padres, Texas Rangers, Houston Astros, Philadelphia Phillies	
Dave Roberts (OF)	August 7, 1999	September 28, 2008	Outfielder	Cleveland Indians, Los Angeles Dodgers, Boston Red Sox, San Diego Padres, San Francisco Giants	
Grant Roberts	July 27, 2000	April 18, 2004	Pitcher	New York Mets	
Jim Roberts	July 15, 1924	April 16, 1925	Pitcher	Brooklyn Robins	
Leon Roberts	September 3, 1974	September 30, 1984	Outfielder	Detroit Tigers, Houston Astros, Seattle Mariners, Texas Rangers, Kansas City Royals	
Ray Roberts	September 12, 1919	September 26, 1919	Pitcher	Philadelphia Athletics	
Red Roberts	September 3, 1943	October 3, 1943	Shortstop	Washington Senators	
Robin Roberts β	June 18, 1948	September 3, 1966	Pitcher	Philadelphia Phillies, Baltimore Orioles, Houston Astros, Chicago Cubs	
Ryan Roberts	July 30, 2006		Utility infielder	Toronto Blue Jays, Texas Rangers, Arizona Diamondbacks	
Skipper Roberts	June 12, 1913	August 12, 1914	Catcher	St. Louis Cardinals, Pittsburgh Rebels, Chicago Chi-Feds	
Willis Roberts	July 2, 1999	August 13, 2004	Pitcher	Detroit Tigers, Baltimore Orioles, Pittsburgh Pirates	
Andre Robertson	September 3, 1981	October 6, 1985	Shortstop	New York Yankees	
Bob Robertson	September 18, 1967	June 23, 1979	First baseman	Pittsburgh Pirates, Seattle Mariners, Toronto Blue Jays	
Charlie Robertson	May 13, 1919	June 18, 1928	Pitcher	Chicago White Sox, St. Louis Browns, Boston Braves	
Connor Robertson	May 17, 2007		Pitcher	Oakland Athletics, Arizona Diamondbacks	
Daryl Robertson	May 4, 1962	May 19, 1962	Shortstop	Chicago Cubs	
Dave Robertson	June 5, 1912	September 27, 1922	Outfielder	New York Giants, Chicago Cubs, Pittsburgh Pirates	
David Robertson	June 29, 2008		Pitcher	New York Yankees	
Dick Robertson	September 16, 1913	June 20, 1919	Pitcher	Cincinnati Reds, Boston Red Sox, Washington Senators	
Don Robertson	April 13, 1954	May 23, 1954	Outfielder	Chicago Cubs	
Gene Robertson	July 4, 1919	May 18, 1930	Third baseman	St. Louis Browns, New York Yankees, Boston Braves	
Jeriome Robertson	September 2, 2002	July 21, 2004	Pitcher	Houston Astros, Cleveland Indians	
Jerry Robertson	April 8, 1969	June 28, 1970	Pitcher	Montreal Expos, Detroit Tigers	
Jim Robertson	April 15, 1954	May 10, 1955	Catcher	Philadelphia/Kansas City Athletics	
Mike Robertson	September 6, 1996	June 26, 1998	First baseman	Chicago White Sox, Philadelphia Phillies, Arizona Diamondbacks	
Nate Robertson	September 7, 2002		Pitcher	Florida Marlins, Detroit Tigers, Philadelphia Phillies	
Rich Robertson (RHP)	September 10, 1966	July 20, 1971	Pitcher	San Francisco Giants	
Rich Robertson (LHP)	April 30, 1993	May 3, 1998	Pitcher	Pittsburgh Pirates, Minnesota Twins, Anaheim Angels	
Sherry Robertson	September 8, 1940	September 21, 1952	Utility player	Washington Senators, Philadelphia Athletics	
Billy Jo Robidoux	September 11, 1985	September 17, 1990	First baseman	Milwaukee Brewers, Chicago White Sox, Boston Red Sox	
Aaron Robinson	May 6, 1943	September 28, 1951	Catcher	New York Yankees, Chicago White Sox, Detroit Tigers, Boston Red Sox	
Bill Robinson (OF)	September 20, 1966	May 23, 1983	Outfielder	New York Yankees, Philadelphia Phillies, Pittsburgh Pirates	
Brooks Robinson β	September 17, 1955	August 13, 1977	Third baseman	Baltimore Orioles	
Bruce Robinson	August 19, 1978	October 4, 1980	Catcher	Oakland Athletics, New York Yankees	
Charlie Robinson	August 2, 1884	July 4, 1885	Catcher	Indianapolis Hoosiers (AA), Brooklyn Grays	
Craig Robinson	September 9, 1972	October 1, 1977	Shortstop	Philadelphia Phillies, Atlanta Braves, San Francisco Giants	
Dave Robinson	September 10, 1970	April 21, 1971	Outfielder	San Diego Padres	
Dewey Robinson	April 6, 1979	October 4, 1981	Pitcher	Chicago White Sox	
Don Robinson	April 10, 1978	July 12, 1992	Pitcher	Pittsburgh Pirates, San Francisco Giants, California Angels, Philadelphia Phillies	
Earl Robinson	September 10, 1958	September 30, 1964	Outfielder	Los Angeles Dodgers, Baltimore Orioles	
Eddie Robinson	September 9, 1942	September 15, 1957	First baseman	Cleveland Indians, Washington Senators, Chicago White Sox, Philadelphia Athletics, New York Yankees, Kansas City Athletics, Detroit Tigers, Baltimore Orioles	
Floyd Robinson	August 10, 1960	September 29, 1968	Outfielder	Chicago White Sox, Cincinnati Reds, Oakland Athletics, Boston Red Sox	
Frank Robinson β	April 17, 1956	September 18, 1976	Outfielder	Cincinnati Reds, Baltimore Orioles, Los Angeles Dodgers, California Angels, Cleveland Indians	
Fred Robinson	April 17, 1884	April 19, 1884	Second baseman	Cincinnati Outlaw Reds	
Hank Robinson	September 2, 1911	August 12, 1918	Pitcher	Pittsburgh Pirates, St. Louis Cardinals, New York Yankees	
Humberto Robinson	April 20, 1955	July 24, 1960	Pitcher	Milwaukee Braves, Cleveland Indians, Philadelphia Phillies	
Jack Robinson (C)	September 6, 1902	October 3, 1902	Catcher	New York Giants	
Jack Robinson (P)	May 4, 1949	May 11, 1949	Pitcher	Boston Red Sox	
Jackie Robinson β	April 15, 1947	September 30, 1956	Second baseman	Brooklyn Dodgers	
Jeff Robinson (RP)	April 7, 1984	October 3, 1992	Pitcher	San Francisco Giants, Pittsburgh Pirates, New York Yankees, California Angels, Chicago Cubs	
Jeff Robinson (SP)	April 12, 1987	July 20, 1992	Pitcher	Detroit Tigers, Baltimore Orioles, Texas Rangers, Pittsburgh Pirates	
Kenny Robinson	July 20, 1995	September 24, 1997	Pitcher	Toronto Blue Jays, Kansas City Royals	
Kerry Robinson	September 22, 1998	June 17, 2006	Outfielder	Tampa Bay Devil Rays, Cincinnati Reds, St. Louis Cardinals, San Diego Padres, Kansas City royals	
Rabbit Robinson	April 22, 1903	June 9, 1910	Utility player	Washington Senators, Detroit Tigers, Cincinnati Reds	
Ron Robinson	August 14, 1984	July 2, 1992	Pitcher	Cincinnati Reds, Milwaukee Brewers	
Shane Robinson	May 7, 2009		Outfielder	St. Louis Cardinals	
Trayvon Robinson	August 5, 2011		Outfielder	Seattle Mariners	
Val Robinson	May 1, 1872	May 24, 1872	Outfielder	Washington Olympics	
Wilbert Robinson β	April 19, 1886	September 29, 1902	Catcher	Philadelphia Athletics (AA), Baltimore Orioles, St. Louis Cardinals, Baltimore Orioles	
Yank Robinson	August 24, 1882	August 10, 1892	Second baseman	Detroit Wolverines, Baltimore Monumentals, St. Louis Browns, Pittsburgh Burghers, Cincinnati Kelly's Killers, Washington Senators (1891–99)	
Chick Robitaille	September 2, 1904	August 29, 1905	Pitcher	Pittsburgh Pirates	
Óscar Robles	May 10, 2005		Utility infielder	Los Angeles Dodgers, San Diego Padres	
Rafael Robles	April 8, 1969	June 10, 1972	Shortstop	San Diego Padres	
Sergio Robles	August 27, 1972	September 13, 1976	Catcher	Baltimore Orioles, Los Angeles Dodgers	
Tom Robson	September 14, 1974	September 18, 1975	First baseman	Texas Rangers	
Adam Rocap	May 5, 1875	October 28, 1875	Outfielder	Philadelphia Athletics (1860–76)	
Mickey Rocco	June 5, 1943	June 24, 1946	First baseman	Cleveland Indians	
Armando Roche	May 10, 1945	June 5, 1945	Pitcher	Washington Senators	
Jack Roche	May 24, 1914	April 18, 1917	Catcher	St. Louis Cardinals	
Ben Rochefort	October 3, 1914	October 3, 1914	First baseman	Philadelphia Athletics	
Lou Rochelli	August 25, 1944	August 29, 1944	Second baseman	Brooklyn Dodgers	
Mike Rochford	September 3, 1988	April 16, 1990	Pitcher	Boston Red Sox	
Les Rock	September 11, 1936	September 23, 1936	First baseman	Chicago White Sox	
Ike Rockenfield	May 5, 1905	October 7, 1906	Second baseman	St. Louis Browns	
John Rocker	May 5, 1998	May 14, 2003	Pitcher	Atlanta Braves, Cleveland Indians, Texas Rangers, Tampa Bay Devil Rays	
Pat Rockett	September 17, 1976	July 8, 1978	Shortstop	Atlanta Braves	
Rich Rodas	September 6, 1983	June 19, 1984	Pitcher	Los Angeles Dodgers	
Andre Rodgers	April 16, 1957	September 30, 1967	Shortstop	San Francisco/New York Giants, Chicago Cubs, Pittsburgh Pirates	
Bill Rodgers (IF)	April 15, 1915	May 13, 1916	Second baseman	Cleveland Indians, Boston Red Sox, Cincinnati Reds	
Bill Rodgers (OF)	September 27, 1944	April 21, 1945	Outfielder	Pittsburgh Pirates	
Buck Rodgers	September 8, 1961	October 1, 1969	Catcher	Los Angeles/California Angels	
Eric Rodin	September 7, 1954	September 24, 1954	Outfielder	New York Giants	
Fernando Rodney	May 4, 2002		Pitcher	Detroit Tigers, Los Angeles Angels of Anaheim	
Alex Rodriguez	July 8, 1994		Shortstop	Seattle Mariners, Texas Rangers, New York Yankees	
Aneury Rodríguez	April 2, 2011		Pitcher	Houston Astros	
Aurelio Rodríguez	September 1, 1967	October 1, 1983	Third baseman	California Angels, Washington Senators (1961–1971), Detroit Tigers, San Diego Padres, New York Yankees, Chicago White Sox, Baltimore Orioles	
Carlos Rodríguez	June 16, 1991	October 1, 1995	Utility infielder	New York Yankees, Boston Red Sox	
Eddy Rodríguez	May 31, 2004	July 31, 2006	Pitcher	Baltimore Orioles	
Eduardo Rodríguez	June 20, 1973	September 17, 1979	Pitcher	Milwaukee Brewers, Kansas City Royals	
Edwin Rodríguez	September 28, 1982	April 30, 1985	Second baseman	New York Yankees, San Diego Padres	
Ellie Rodríguez	May 26, 1968	October 3, 1976	Catcher	New York Yankees, Kansas City Royals, Milwaukee Brewers, California Angels, Los Angeles Dodgers	
Félix Rodríguez	May 13, 1995	September 30, 2006	Pitcher	Los Angeles Dodgers, Cincinnati Reds, Arizona Diamondbacks, San Francisco Giants, Philadelphia Phillies, New York Yankees, Washington Nationals	
Fernando Rodriguez	May 2, 2009		Pitcher	Los Angeles Angels of Anaheim, Houston Astros	
Francisco Rodríguez (P born 1982)	September 18, 2002		Pitcher	Anaheim Angels/Los Angeles Angels of Anaheim, New York Mets, Milwaukee Brewers	
Francisco Rodríguez (P born 1983)	April 15, 2010		Pitcher	Los Angeles Angels of Anaheim	
Frank Rodriguez	April 26, 1995	July 22, 2001	Pitcher	Boston Red Sox, Minnesota Twins, Seattle Mariners, Cincinnati Reds	
Freddy Rodríguez	April 18, 1958	May 27, 1959	Pitcher	Chicago Cubs, Philadelphia Phillies	
Guillermo Rodríguez	June 13, 2007		Catcher	San Francisco Giants, Baltimore Orioles	
Héctor Rodríguez	April 15, 1952	September 16, 1952	Third baseman	Chicago White Sox	
Henry Rodríguez (OF)	July 5, 1992	May 7, 2002	Outfielder	Los Angeles Dodgers, Montreal Expos, Chicago Cubs, Florida Marlins, Montreal Expos	
Henry Rodríguez (P)	September 21, 2009		Pitcher	Oakland Athletics, Washington Nationals	
Iván Rodríguez	June 20, 1991		Catcher	Texas Rangers, Florida Marlins, Detroit Tigers, New York Yankees, Houston Astros, Washington Nationals	
John Rodriguez	July 18, 2005	October 1, 2006	Outfielder	St. Louis Cardinals	
José Rodríguez (2B)	October 5, 1916	September 2, 1918	Second baseman	New York Giants	
José Rodríguez (P)	May 18, 2000	July 13, 2002	Pitcher	St. Louis Cardinals, Minnesota Twins	
Josh Rodriguez	April 5, 2011		Infielder	Pittsburgh Pirates	
Liu Rodríguez	June 9, 1999	October 3, 1999	Utility infielder	Chicago White Sox	
Luis Rodríguez	May 21, 2005		Utility infielder	Minnesota Twins, San Diego Padres, Seattle Mariners	
Nerio Rodríguez	August 18, 1996	August 29, 2002	Pitcher	Baltimore Orioles, Toronto Blue Jays, Cleveland Indians, St. Louis Cardinals	
Rafael Rodríguez	April 15, 2009		Pitcher	Los Angeles Angels of Anaheim, Arizona Diamondbacks	
Ricardo Rodríguez	August 21, 2002	August 8, 2005	Pitcher	Cleveland Indians, Texas Rangers	
Rich Rodriguez	June 30, 1990	May 3, 2003	Pitcher	San Diego Padres, Florida Marlins, St. Louis Cardinals, San Francisco Giants, New York Mets, Cleveland Indians, Texas Rangers, Anaheim Angels	
Rick Rodriguez	September 17, 1986	August 26, 1990	Pitcher	Oakland Athletics, Cleveland Indians, San Francisco Giants	
Roberto Rodríguez	May 13, 1967	September 26, 1970	Pitcher	Kansas City/Oakland Athletics, San Diego Padres, Chicago Cubs	
Rosario Rodríguez	September 1, 1989	October 4, 1991	Pitcher	Cincinnati Reds, Pittsburgh Pirates	
Rubén Rodríguez	September 17, 1986	October 1, 1988	Catcher	Pittsburgh Pirates	
Sean Rodriguez	April 19, 2008		Second baseman	Los Angeles Angels of Anaheim, Tampa Bay Rays	
Steve Rodriguez	April 30, 1995	October 1, 1995	Second baseman	Boston Red Sox, Detroit Tigers	
Tony Rodríguez	July 6, 1996	September 23, 1996	Shortstop	Boston Red Sox	
Vic Rodriguez	September 5, 1984	July 30, 1989	Utility infielder	Baltimore Orioles, Minnesota Twins	
Wandy Rodríguez	May 23, 2005		Pitcher	Houston Astros	
Wilfredo Rodríguez	September 21, 2001	October 4, 2001	Pitcher	Houston Astros	
Clay Roe	October 3, 1923	October 3, 1923	Pitcher	Washington Senators	
Preacher Roe	August 22, 1938	September 4, 1954	Pitcher	St. Louis Cardinals, Pittsburgh Pirates, Brooklyn Dodgers	
Ed Roebuck	April 18, 1955	July 7, 1966	Pitcher	Brooklyn/Los Angeles Dodgers, Washington Senators (1961–1971), Philadelphia Phillies	
Gary Roenicke	June 8, 1976	July 24, 1988	Outfielder	Montreal Expos, Baltimore Orioles, New York Yankees, Atlanta Braves	
Josh Roenicke	September 13, 2008		Pitcher	Cincinnati Reds, Toronto Blue Jays, Colorado Rockies	
Ron Roenicke	September 2, 1981	May 21, 1988	Outfielder	Los Angeles Dodgers, Seattle Mariners, San Diego Padres, San Francisco Giants, Philadelphia Phillies	
Mike Roesler	August 9, 1989	April 23, 1990	Pitcher	Cincinnati Reds, Pittsburgh Pirates	
Oscar Roettger	July 7, 1923	June 27, 1932	First baseman	New York Yankees, Brooklyn Robins, Philadelphia Athletics	
Wally Roettger	May 1, 1927	September 30, 1934	Outfielder	St. Louis Cardinals, New York Giants, Cincinnati Reds, Pittsburgh Pirates	
Ed Roetz	May 26, 1929	October 6, 1929	Utility infielder	St. Louis Browns	
Joe Rogalski	September 14, 1938	September 23, 1938	Pitcher	Detroit Tigers	
Billy Rogell	April 14, 1925	August 25, 1940	Shortstop	Boston Red Sox, Detroit Tigers, Chicago Cubs	
Brian Rogers	September 1, 2006	May 26, 2007	Pitcher	Pittsburgh Pirates	
Buck Rogers	September 15, 1935	September 24, 1935	Pitcher	Washington Senators	
Ed Rogers	September 5, 2002	July 8, 2006	Utility player	Baltimore Orioles	
Emmett Rogers	April 19, 1890	September 28, 1890	Catcher	Toledo Maumees	
Esmil Rogers	September 12, 2009		Pitcher	Colorado Rockies	
Fraley Rogers	April 30, 1872	July 16, 1873	Outfielder	Boston Red Stockings	
Jay Rogers	May 22, 1914	June 26, 1914	Catcher	New York Yankees	
Jim Rogers	April 17, 1896	June 15, 1897	Utility infielder	Washington Senators (1891–99), Louisville Colonels	
Jimmy Rogers	July 30, 1995	September 27, 1995	Pitcher	Toronto Blue Jays	
Kenny Rogers	April 6, 1989	September 14, 2008	Pitcher	Texas Rangers, New York Yankees, Oakland Athletics, New York Mets, Minnesota Twins, Detroit Tigers	
Kevin Rogers	September 4, 1992	May 1, 1994	Pitcher	San Francisco Giants	
Lee Rogers	April 24, 1938	September 29, 1938	Pitcher	Boston Red Sox, Brooklyn Dodgers	
Mark Rogers	September 10, 2010		Pitcher	Milwaukee Brewers	
Packy Rogers	July 12, 1938	September 7, 1938	Utility infielder	Brooklyn Dodgers	
Steve Rogers	July 18, 1973	May 19, 1985	Pitcher	Montreal Expos	
Tom Rogers	April 14, 1917	October 1, 1921	Pitcher	St. Louis Browns, Philadelphia Athletics, New York Yankees	
Clint Rogge	April 11, 1915	June 6, 1921	Pitcher	Pittsburgh Rebels, Cincinnati Reds	
Garry Roggenburk	April 20, 1963	July 27, 1969	Pitcher	Minnesota Twins, Boston Red Sox, Seattle Pilots	
Mike Rogodzinski	May 4, 1973	September 28, 1975	Outfielder	Philadelphia Phillies	
Saul Rogovin	April 28, 1949	June 19, 1957	Pitcher	Detroit Tigers, Chicago White Sox, Baltimore Orioles, Philadelphia Phillies	
Dave Rohde	April 9, 1990	May 22, 1992	Second baseman	Houston Astros, Cleveland Indians	
George Rohe	May 7, 1901	October 6, 1907	Third baseman	Baltimore Orioles (1901–02), Chicago White Sox	
Ryan Rohlinger	August 13, 2008		Third baseman	San Francisco Giants	
Dan Rohn	September 2, 1983	May 21, 1986	Utility infielder	Chicago Cubs, Cleveland Indians	
Billy Rohr	April 14, 1967	June 26, 1968	Pitcher	Boston Red Sox, Cleveland Indians	
Les Rohr	September 19, 1967	September 19, 1969	Pitcher	New York Mets	
Dan Rohrmeier	September 3, 1997	September 28, 1997	First baseman	Seattle Mariners	
Ray Rohwer	April 13, 1921	September 1, 1922	Outfielder	Pittsburgh Pirates	
Tony Roig	September 13, 1953	September 26, 1956	Utility infielder	Washington Senators	
Cookie Rojas	April 10, 1962	October 1, 1977	Second baseman	Cincinnati Reds, Philadelphia Phillies, St. Louis Cardinals, Kansas City Royals	
Mel Rojas	August 1, 1990	July 1, 1999	Pitcher	Montreal Expos, Chicago Cubs, New York Mets, Los Angeles Dodgers, Detroit Tigers	
Minnie Rojas	May 30, 1966	July 24, 1968	Pitcher	California Angels	
Stan Rojek	September 22, 1942	May 13, 1952	Shortstop	Brooklyn Dodgers, Pittsburgh Pirates, St. Louis Cardinals, St. Louis Browns	
Jim Roland	September 20, 1962	September 16, 1972	Pitcher	Minnesota Twins, Oakland Athletics, New York Yankees, Texas Rangers	
Scott Rolen	August 1, 1996		Third baseman	Philadelphia Phillies, St. Louis Cardinals, Toronto Blue Jays, Cincinnati Reds	
Red Rolfe	June 29, 1931	September 27, 1942	Third baseman	New York Yankees	
Nate Rolison	September 5, 2000	September 30, 2000	First baseman	Florida Marlins	
Ray Rolling	September 6, 1912	September 26, 1912	Second baseman	St. Louis Cardinals	
Red Rollings	April 17, 1927	September 11, 1930	Third baseman	Boston Red Sox, Boston Braves	
Jimmy Rollins	September 17, 2000		Shortstop	Philadelphia Phillies	
Rich Rollins	June 16, 1961	September 26, 1970	Third baseman	Minnesota Twins, Seattle Pilots, Milwaukee Brewers, Cleveland Indians	
Bill Rollinson	June 17, 1884	June 17, 1884	Catcher	Washington Nationals (UA)	
Damian Rolls	September 3, 2000	October 3, 2004	Utility player	Tampa Bay Devil Rays	
Bill Roman	September 30, 1964	October 3, 1965	First baseman	Detroit Tigers	
José Román	September 5, 1984	August 27, 1986	Pitcher	Cleveland Indians	
Ron Romanick	April 5, 1984	July 21, 1986	Pitcher	California Angels	
Jason Romano	April 17, 2002	July 9, 2005	Outfielder	Texas Rangers, Colorado Rockies, Los Angeles Dodgers, Tampa Bay Devil Rays, Cincinnati Reds	
Jim Romano	September 21, 1950	September 29, 1950	Pitcher	Brooklyn Dodgers	
Johnny Romano	September 12, 1958	September 4, 1967	Catcher	Chicago White Sox, Cleveland Indians, St. Louis Cardinals	
Mike Romano	September 5, 1999	September 24, 1999	Pitcher	Toronto Blue Jays	
Tom Romano	September 1, 1987	October 2, 1987	Outfielder	Montreal Expos	
Dutch Romberger	May 31, 1954	August 1, 1954	Pitcher	Philadelphia Athletics	
Alex Romero	April 2, 2008		Outfielder	Arizona Diamondbacks	
Davis Romero	August 18, 2006	September 30, 2006	Pitcher	Toronto Blue Jays	
Ed Romero	July 16, 1977	June 27, 1990	Utility infielder	Milwaukee Brewers, Boston Red Sox, Atlanta Braves, Detroit Tigers	
J. C. Romero	September 15, 1999		Pitcher	Minnesota Twins, Los Angeles Angels of Anaheim, Boston Red Sox, Philadelphia Phillies, Colorado Rockies	
Mandy Romero	July 15, 1997	August 24, 2003	Catcher	San Diego Padres, Boston Red Sox, Colorado Rockies	
Niuman Romero	September 8, 2009		Shortstop	Cleveland Indians, Boston Red Sox	
Ramón Romero	September 18, 1984	September 21, 1985	Pitcher	Cleveland Indians	
Ricky Romero	April 9, 2009		Pitcher	Toronto Blue Jays	
Andrew Romine	September 24, 2010		Shortstop	Los Angeles Angels of Anaheim	
Austin Romine	September 11, 2011		Catcher	New York Yankees	
Kevin Romine	September 4, 1985	August 4, 1991	Outfielder	Boston Red Sox	
Eddie Rommel	April 19, 1920	September 17, 1932	Pitcher	Philadelphia Athletics	
Enrique Romo	April 7, 1977	October 1, 1982	Pitcher	Seattle Mariners, Pittsburgh Pirates	
Sergio Romo	June 26, 2008		Pitcher	San Francisco Giants	
Vicente Romo	April 11, 1968	July 27, 1982	Pitcher	Los Angeles Dodgers, Cleveland Indians, Boston Red Sox, Chicago White Sox, San Diego Padres	
John Romonosky	September 6, 1953	September 11, 1959	Pitcher	St. Louis Cardinals, Washington Senators	
Marc Ronan	September 21, 1993	October 3, 1993	Catcher	St. Louis Cardinals	
Henri Rondeau	April 11, 1913	July 1, 1916	Outfielder	Detroit Tigers, Washington Senators	
Gilberto Rondón	April 10, 1976	September 29, 1979	Pitcher	Houston Astros, Chicago White Sox	
Matt Roney	April 2, 2003	May 30, 2006	Pitcher	Detroit Tigers, Oakland Athletics	
Gene Roof	September 3, 1981	October 2, 1983	Outfielder	St. Louis Cardinals, Montreal Expos	
Phil Roof	April 29, 1961	May 30, 1977	Catcher	Milwaukee Braves, California Angels, Cleveland Indians, Kansas City/Oakland Athletics, Milwaukee Brewers, Minnesota Twins, Chicago White Sox, Toronto Blue Jays	
Jim Rooker	June 30, 1968	May 2, 1980	Pitcher	Kansas City Royals, Detroit Tigers, Pittsburgh Pirates	
George Rooks	May 12, 1891	May 16, 1891	Outfielder	Boston Beaneaters	
Rolando Roomes	April 22, 1988	September 30, 1990	Outfielder	Chicago Cubs, Cincinnati Reds, Montreal Expos	
Frank Rooney	April 18, 1914	June 6, 1914	First baseman	Indianapolis Hoosiers (FL)	
Pat Rooney	September 9, 1981	October 4, 1981	Outfielder	Montreal Expos	
Charlie Root	April 18, 1923	September 2, 1941	Pitcher	St. Louis Browns, Chicago Cubs	
John Roper	May 16, 1993	September 11, 1995	Pitcher	Cincinnati Reds, San Francisco Giants	
Jorge Roque	September 4, 1970	May 15, 1973	Outfielder	St. Louis Cardinals, Montreal Expos	
Rafael Roque	August 1, 1998	September 28, 2000	Pitcher	Milwaukee Brewers	
Carlos Rosa	June 14, 2008		Pitcher	Kansas City Royals, Arizona Diamondbacks	
José Rosado	June 12, 1996	April 30, 2000	Pitcher	Kansas City Royals	
Luis Rosado	September 8, 1977	October 5, 1980	First baseman	New York Mets	
Adam Rosales	August 9, 2008		Third baseman	Cincinnati Reds, Oakland Athletics	
Leo Rosales	June 15, 2008		Pitcher	Arizona Diamondbacks	
Buddy Rosar	April 29, 1939	September 19, 1951	Catcher	New York Yankees, Cleveland Indians, Philadelphia Athletics, Boston Red Sox	
Francisco Rosario	May 6, 2006		Pitcher	Toronto Blue Jays, Philadelphia Phillies	
Jimmy Rosario	April 8, 1971	June 21, 1976	Outfielder	San Francisco Giants, Milwaukee Brewers	
Mel Rosario	September 11, 1997	September 28, 1997	Catcher	Baltimore Orioles	
Rodrigo Rosario	June 21, 2003	June 27, 2003	Pitcher	Houston Astros	
Sandy Rosario	September 23, 2010		Pitcher	Florida Marlins	
Santiago Rosario	June 23, 1965	October 3, 1965	First baseman	Kansas City Athletics	
Víctor Rosario	September 6, 1990	October 3, 1990	Shortstop	Atlanta Braves	
Wilin Rosario	September 6, 2011		Catcher	Colorado Rockies	
Bobby Rose	August 12, 1989	May 19, 1992	Second baseman	California Angels	
Brian Rose	July 25, 1997	May 30, 2001	Pitcher	Boston Red Sox, Colorado Rockies, New York Mets, Tampa Bay Devil Rays	
Chuck Rose	September 13, 1909	September 29, 1909	Pitcher	St. Louis Browns	
Don Rose	September 15, 1971	April 23, 1974	Pitcher	New York Mets, California Angels, San Francisco Giants	
Mike Rose	October 1, 2004	October 1, 2006	Catcher	Oakland Athletics, Los Angeles Dodgers, St. Louis Cardinals	
Pete Rose	April 8, 1963	August 17, 1986	Utility player	Cincinnati Reds, Philadelphia Phillies, Montreal Expos	
Pete Rose Jr.	September 1, 1997	September 28, 1997	Third baseman	Cincinnati Reds	
John Roseboro	June 14, 1957	August 11, 1970	Catcher	Brooklyn/Los Angeles Dodgers, Minnesota Twins, Washington Senators (1961–1971)	
Zeke Rosebraugh	September 21, 1898	July 5, 1899	Pitcher	Pittsburgh Pirates	
Bob Roselli	August 16, 1955	September 29, 1962	Catcher	Milwaukee Braves, Chicago White Sox	
Dave Rosello	September 10, 1972	October 5, 1981	Utility infielder	Chicago Cubs, Cleveland Indians	
Chief Roseman	May 1, 1882	August 25, 1890	Outfielder	Troy Trojans, New York Metropolitans, Philadelphia Athletics (AA), Brooklyn Grays, St. Louis Browns (AA), Louisville Colonels	
Al Rosen	September 10, 1947	September 30, 1956	Third baseman	Cleveland Indians	
Goody Rosen	September 14, 1937	September 26, 1946	Outfielder	Brooklyn Dodgers, New York Giants	
Harry Rosenberg	July 15, 1930	September 20, 1930	Outfielder	New York Giants	
Lou Rosenberg	May 22, 1923	July 16, 1923	Second baseman	Chicago White Sox	
Steve Rosenberg	June 4, 1988	May 26, 1991	Pitcher	Chicago White Sox, San Diego Padres	
Max Rosenfeld	April 21, 1931	May 13, 1933	Outfielder	Brooklyn Dodgers	
Larry Rosenthal	June 20, 1936	June 22, 1945	Outfielder	Chicago White Sox, Cleveland Indians, New York Yankees, Philadelphia Athletics	
Si Rosenthal	September 8, 1925	September 26, 1926	Outfielder	Boston Red Sox	
Wayne Rosenthal	June 26, 1991	April 14, 1992	Pitcher	Texas Rangers	
Bunny Roser	August 24, 1922	September 22, 1922	Outfielder	Boston Braves	
Steve Roser	May 5, 1944	June 29, 1946	Pitcher	New York Yankees, Boston Braves	
John Roskos	April 20, 1998	May 14, 2000	Utility player	Florida Marlins, San Diego Padres	
Bob Ross	June 16, 1950	May 8, 1956	Pitcher	Washington Senators, Philadelphia Phillies	
Buck Ross	May 7, 1936	September 10, 1945	Pitcher	Philadelphia Athletics, Chicago White Sox	
Buster Ross	June 15, 1924	May 13, 1926	Pitcher	Boston Red Sox	
Chet Ross	September 15, 1939	August 4, 1944	Outfielder	Boston Braves	
Cliff Ross	September 11, 1954	September 20, 1954	Pitcher	Cincinnati Redlegs	
Cody Ross	July 4, 2003		Outfielder	Detroit Tigers, Los Angeles Dodgers, Cincinnati Reds, Florida Marlins, San Francisco Giants	
David Ross	June 29, 2002		Catcher	Los Angeles Dodgers, Pittsburgh Pirates, San Diego Padres, Cincinnati Reds, Boston Red Sox, Atlanta Braves	
Don Ross	April 19, 1938	September 22, 1946	Third baseman	Detroit Tigers, Brooklyn Dodgers, Cleveland Indians	
Ernie Ross	September 17, 1902	September 22, 1902	Pitcher	Baltimore Orioles (1901–02)	
Gary Ross	June 28, 1968	July 8, 1977	Pitcher	Chicago Cubs, San Diego Padres, California Angels	
George Ross	June 27, 1918	June 27, 1918	Pitcher	New York Giants	
Mark Ross	September 12, 1982	August 15, 1990	Pitcher	Houston Astros, Pittsburgh Pirates, Toronto Blue Jays	
Tyson Ross	April 7, 2010		Pitcher	Oakland Athletics	
Joe Rosselli	April 30, 1995	October 1, 1995	Pitcher	San Francisco Giants	
Joe Rossi	April 20, 1952	September 12, 1952	Catcher	Cincinnati Reds	
Claude Rossman	September 16, 1904	September 3, 1909	First baseman	Cleveland Naps, Detroit Tigers, St. Louis Browns	
Frank Rosso	September 15, 1944	October 1, 1944	Pitcher	New York Giants	
Rico Rossy	September 11, 1991	September 27, 1998	Utility infielder	Atlanta Braves, Kansas City Royals, Seattle Mariners	
Marv Rotblatt	July 4, 1948	July 22, 1951	Pitcher	Chicago White Sox	
Bill Rotes	June 14, 1893	August 15, 1893	Pitcher	Louisville Colonels	
Braggo Roth	September 1, 1914	October 1, 1921	Outfielder	Chicago White Sox, Cleveland Indians, Philadelphia Athletics, Boston Red Sox, Washington Senators, New York Yankees	
Frank Roth	April 18, 1903	October 9, 1910	Catcher	Philadelphia Phillies, St. Louis Browns, Chicago White Sox, Cincinnati Reds	
Bob Rothel	April 22, 1945	April 29, 1945	Third baseman	Cleveland Indians	
Bobby Rothermel	June 18, 1899	July 15, 1899	Second baseman	Baltimore Orioles (19th century)	
Jack Rothfuss	August 2, 1897	September 25, 1897	First baseman	Pittsburgh Pirates	
Claude Rothgeb	June 17, 1905	September 30, 1905	Outfielder	Washington Senators	
Jack Rothrock	July 28, 1925	October 2, 1937	Outfielder	Boston Red Sox, Chicago White Sox, St. Louis Cardinals, Philadelphia Athletics	
Larry Rothschild	September 11, 1981	September 11, 1982	Pitcher	Detroit Tigers	
Vinny Rottino	September 1, 2006		Utility player	Milwaukee Brewers, Florida Marlins	
Gene Rounsaville	April 7, 1970	April 29, 1970	Pitcher	Chicago White Sox	
Mike Rouse	June 9, 2006	August 4, 2007	Utility infielder	Oakland Athletics, Cleveland Indians	
Edd Roush β	August 20, 1913	September 27, 1931	Outfielder	Chicago White Sox, Indianapolis Hoosiers (FL)/Newark Peppers, Cincinnati Reds, New York Giants	
Phil Routcliffe	April 21, 1890	April 21, 1890	Outfielder	Pittsburgh Alleghenys	
Dave Rowan	May 27, 1911	June 22, 1911	First baseman	St. Louis Browns	
Jack Rowan	September 6, 1906	July 10, 1914	Pitcher	Detroit Tigers, Cincinnati Reds, Philadelphia Phillies, Chicago Cubs	
Aaron Rowand	June 16, 2001		Outfielder	Chicago White Sox, Philadelphia Phillies, San Francisco Giants	
Wade Rowdon	September 8, 1984	June 19, 1988	Third baseman	Cincinnati Reds, Chicago Cubs, Baltimore Orioles	
Dave Rowe	May 30, 1877	June 17, 1888	Outfielder	Chicago White Stockings, Cleveland Blues (NL), Baltimore Orioles (19th century), St. Louis Maroons, Kansas City Cowboys (NL), Kansas City Cowboys (AA)	
Don Rowe	April 9, 1963	July 18, 1963	Pitcher	New York Mets	
Harland Rowe	June 23, 1916	September 27, 1916	Third baseman	Philadelphia Athletics	
Jack Rowe	September 6, 1879	October 4, 1890	Shortstop	Buffalo Bisons (NL), Detroit Wolverines, Pittsburgh Alleghenys, Buffalo Bisons (PL)	
Ken Rowe	April 14, 1963	May 4, 1965	Pitcher	Los Angeles Dodgers, Baltimore Orioles	
Schoolboy Rowe	April 15, 1933	September 13, 1949	Pitcher	Detroit Tigers, Brooklyn Dodgers, Philadelphia Phillies	
Bama Rowell	September 4, 1939	October 2, 1948	Utility player	Boston Braves, Philadelphia Phillies	
Ed Rowen	May 1, 1882	May 12, 1884	Utility player	Boston Red Caps, Philadelphia Athletics (AA)	
Chuck Rowland	May 11, 1923	August 19, 1923	Catcher	Philadelphia Athletics	
Mike Rowland	July 25, 1980	October 3, 1981	Pitcher	San Francisco Giants	
Rich Rowland	September 7, 1990	June 19, 1995	Catcher	Detroit Tigers, Boston Red Sox	
Ryan Rowland-Smith	June 22, 2007		Pitcher	Seattle Mariners	
Joseph Roxburgh	May 30, 1884	May 5, 1887	Catcher	Baltimore Orioles (19th century), Philadelphia Athletics (AA)	
Charlie Roy	June 27, 1906	August 10, 1906	Pitcher	Philadelphia Phillies	
Emil Roy	September 30, 1933	September 30, 1933	Pitcher	Philadelphia Athletics	
Jean-Pierre Roy	May 5, 1946	May 11, 1946	Pitcher	Brooklyn Dodgers	
Luther Roy	June 12, 1924	October 5, 1929	Pitcher	Cleveland Indians, Chicago Cubs, Philadelphia Phillies, Brooklyn Robins	
Normie Roy	April 23, 1950	September 27, 1950	Pitcher	Boston Braves	
Stan Royer	September 11, 1991	July 22, 1994	Third baseman	St. Louis Cardinals, Boston Red Sox	
Jerry Royster	August 14, 1973	September 28, 1988	Utility player	Los Angeles Dodgers, Atlanta Braves, San Diego Padres, Chicago White Sox, New York Yankees	
Willie Royster	September 3, 1981	October 2, 1981	Catcher	Baltimore Orioles	
Dick Rozek	April 29, 1950	May 16, 1954	Pitcher	Cleveland Indians, Philadelphia Athletics	
Dave Rozema	April 11, 1977	April 30, 1986	Pitcher	Detroit Tigers, Texas Rangers	
Vic Roznovsky	June 28, 1964	October 1, 1969	Catcher	Chicago Cubs, Baltimore orioles, Philadelphia Phillies	
Wilkin Ruan	September 1, 2002	September 28, 2003	Outfielder	Los Angeles Dodgers	
Al Rubeling	April 16, 1940	October 1, 1944	Third baseman	Philadelphia Athletics, Pittsburgh Pirates	
Sonny Ruberto	May 25, 1969	September 24, 1972	Catcher	San Diego Padres, Cincinnati Reds	
Jorge Rubio	April 21, 1966	May 1, 1967	Pitcher	California Angels	
Art Ruble	April 18, 1927	May 13, 1934	Outfielder	Detroit Tigers, Philadelphia Phillies	
Dave Rucker	April 12, 1981	October 2, 1988	Pitcher	Detroit Tigers, St. Louis Cardinals, Philadelphia Phillies, Pittsburgh Pirates	
Johnny Rucker	April 16, 1940	September 29, 1946	Outfielder	New York Giants	
Nap Rucker	April 15, 1907	September 13, 1916	Pitcher	Brooklyn Superbas/Dodgers/Robins	
John Rudderham	September 18, 1884	September 18, 1884	Outfielder	Boston Reds (UA)	
Joe Rudi	April 11, 1967	October 3, 1982	Outfielder	Kansas City/Oakland Athletics, California Angels, Boston Red Sox	
Dick Rudolph	September 30, 1910	September 11, 1927	Pitcher	New York Giants, Boston Braves	
Don Rudolph	September 21, 1957	October 3, 1964	Pitcher	Chicago White Sox, Cincinnati Reds, Cleveland Indians, Washington Senators (1961–1971)	
Dutch Rudolph	July 3, 1903	July 17, 1904	Outfielder	Philadelphia Phillies, Chicago Cubs	
Ernie Rudolph	June 16, 1945	July 6, 1945	Pitcher	Brooklyn Dodgers	
Ken Rudolph	April 20, 1969	September 7, 1977	Catcher	Chicago Cubs, St. Louis Cardinals, San Francisco Giants, Baltimore Orioles	
Matt Ruebel	May 21, 1996	July 4, 1998	Pitcher	Pittsburgh Pirates, Tampa Bay Devil Rays	
Muddy Ruel	May 29, 1915	August 25, 1934	Catcher	St. Louis Browns, New York Yankees, Boston Red Sox, Washington Senators, Detroit Tigers, Chicago White Sox	
Kirk Rueter	July 7, 1993	July 29, 2005	Pitcher	Montreal Expos, San Francisco Giants	
Dutch Ruether	April 13, 1917	September 29, 1927	Pitcher	Chicago Cubs, Cincinnati Reds, Brooklyn Robins, Washington Senators, New York Yankees	
Rudy Rufer	September 22, 1949	October 1, 1950	Shortstop	San Francisco Giants	
Scott Ruffcorn	June 19, 1993	August 17, 1997	Pitcher	Chicago White Sox, Philadelphia Phillies	
Bruce Ruffin	June 28, 1986	June 26, 1997	Pitcher	Philadelphia Phillies, Milwaukee Brewers, Colorado Rockies	
Chance Ruffin	July 25, 2011		Pitcher	Detroit Tigers, Seattle Mariners	
Johnny Ruffin	August 8, 1993	August 2, 2001	Pitcher	Cincinnati Reds, Arizona Diamondbacks, Florida Marlins	
Red Ruffing β	May 31, 1924	September 15, 1947	Pitcher	Boston Red Sox, New York Yankees, Chicago White Sox	
Justin Ruggiano	September 19, 2007		Outfielder	Tampa Bay Devil Rays/Rays	
Vern Ruhle	September 9, 1974	October 4, 1986	Pitcher	Detroit Tigers, Houston Astros, Cleveland Indians, California Angels	
Carlos Ruiz	May 6, 2006		Catcher	Philadelphia Phillies	
Chico Ruiz (1964–71 IF)	April 13, 1964	August 3, 1971	Utility infielder	Cincinnati Reds, California Angels	
Chico Ruiz (1978–80 IF)	July 29, 1978	September 25, 1980	Utility infielder	Atlanta Braves	
Randy Ruiz	August 1, 2008		Designated hitter	Minnesota Twins, Toronto Blue Jays	
Joe Rullo	September 22, 1943	July 4, 1944	Second baseman	Philadelphia Athletics	
William Rumler	May 4, 1914	September 27, 1917	Utility player	St. Louis Browns	
Rich Rundles	September 3, 2008		Pitcher	Cleveland Indians	
Paul Runge	September 25, 1981	September 12, 1988	Utility infielder	Atlanta Braves	
Tom Runnells	August 10, 1985	June 6, 1986	Shortstop	Cincinnati Reds	
Pete Runnels	July 1, 1953	May 14, 1964	Utility infielder	Washington Senators, Boston Red Sox, Houston Colt .45s	
Sean Runyan	March 31, 1998	September 9, 2000	Pitcher	Detroit Tigers	
Dan Runzler	September 4, 2009		Pitcher	San Francisco Giants	
Josh Rupe	September 16, 2005		Pitcher	Texas Rangers, Kansas City Royals, Baltimore Orioles	
Ryan Rupe	May 5, 1999	June 27, 2003	Pitcher	Tampa Bay Devil Rays, Boston Red Sox	
Glendon Rusch	April 6, 1997		Pitcher	Kansas City Royals, New York Mets, Milwaukee Brewers, Chicago Cubs, San Diego Padres, Colorado Rockies	
Andy Rush	April 16, 1925	May 25, 1925	Pitcher	Brooklyn Robins	
Bob Rush	April 22, 1948	August 7, 1960	Pitcher	Chicago Cubs, Milwaukee Braves, Chicago White Sox	
Jim Rushford	September 3, 2002	September 29, 2002	Outfielder	Milwaukee Brewers	
Amos Rusie β	May 9, 1889	June 9, 1901	Pitcher	Indianapolis Hoosiers (NL), New York Giants, Cincinnati Reds	
Scott Ruskin	April 9, 1990	September 16, 1993	Pitcher	Pittsburgh Pirates, Montreal Expos, Cincinnati Reds	
John Russ	July 4, 1882	July 4, 1882	Pitcher	Baltimore Orioles (19th century)	
Adam Russell	June 17, 2008		Pitcher	Chicago White Sox, San Diego Padres, Tampa Bay Rays	
Allen Russell	September 13, 1915	September 19, 1925	Pitcher	New York Yankees, Boston Red Sox, Washington Senators	
Bill Russell	April 7, 1969	October 1, 1986	Shortstop	Los Angeles Dodgers	
Harvey Russell	April 17, 1914	October 3, 1915	Catcher	Baltimore Terrapins	
Jack Russell	May 5, 1926	August 7, 1940	Pitcher	Boston Red Sox, Cleveland Indians, Washington Senators, Detroit Tigers, Chicago Cubs, St. Louis Cardinals	
James Russell	April 5, 2010		Pitcher	Chicago Cubs	
Jeff Russell	August 13, 1983	September 27, 1996	Pitcher	Cincinnati Reds, Texas Rangers, Oakland Athletics, Boston Red Sox, Cleveland Indians	
Jim Russell	September 12, 1942	October 1, 1951	Outfielder	Pittsburgh Pirates, Boston Braves, Brooklyn Dodgers	
John Russell (P)	July 4, 1917	June 12, 1922	Pitcher	Brooklyn Robins, Chicago White Sox	
John Russell (C)	June 22, 1984	October 2, 1993	Catcher	Philadelphia Phillies, Atlanta Braves, Texas Rangers	
Lefty Russell	October 1, 1910	May 28, 1912	Pitcher	Philadelphia Athletics	
Lloyd Russell	April 26, 1938	May 7, 1938	Pinch runner	Cleveland Indians	
Paul Russell	July 29, 1894	August 4, 1894	Utility player	St. Louis Browns (NL)	
Reb Russell	April 18, 1913	September 30, 1923	Pitcher	Chicago White Sox, Pittsburgh Pirates	
Rip Russell	May 5, 1939	July 13, 1947	First baseman	Chicago Cubs, Boston Red Sox	
Kevin Russo	May 8, 2010		Utility player	New York Yankees	
Marius Russo	June 6, 1939	August 4, 1946	Pitcher	New York Yankees	
Dick Rusteck	June 10, 1966	October 2, 1966	Pitcher	New York Mets	
Hank Ruszkowski	September 26, 1944	September 20, 1947	Catcher	Cleveland Indians	
Babe Ruth β	July 11, 1914	May 30, 1935	Outfielder	Boston Red Sox, New York Yankees, Boston Braves	
Jim Rutherford	July 12, 1910	July 12, 1910	Outfielder	Cleveland Naps	
Johnny Rutherford	April 30, 1952	September 23, 1952	Pitcher	Brooklyn Dodgers	
Dick Ruthven	April 17, 1973	May 1, 1986	Pitcher	Philadelphia Phillies, Atlanta Braves, Chicago Cubs	
Mickey Rutner	September 11, 1947	September 28, 1947	Third baseman	Philadelphia Athletics	
Mark Ryal	September 7, 1982	October 3, 1990	Outfielder	Kansas City Royals, Chicago White Sox, California Angels, Philadelphia Phillies, Pittsburgh Pirates	
Rusty Ryal	August 10, 2009		Utility infielder	Arizona Diamondbacks	
B. J. Ryan	July 28, 1999		Pitcher	Cincinnati Reds, Baltimore Orioles, Toronto Blue Jays	
Blondy Ryan	July 13, 1930	July 31, 1938	Shortstop	Chicago White Sox, New York Giants, Philadelphia Phillies, New York Yankees	
Brendan Ryan	June 2, 2007		Shortstop	St. Louis Cardinals, Seattle Mariners	
Buddy Ryan	April 11, 1912	October 5, 1913	Outfielder	Cleveland Naps	
Connie Ryan	April 14, 1942	April 19, 1954	Second baseman	New York Giants, Boston Braves, Cincinnati Reds, Cincinnati Reds, Philadelphia Phillies, Chicago White Sox, Cincinnati Redlegs	
Cyclone Ryan	August 8, 1887	May 8, 1891	First baseman	New York Metropolitans, Boston Beaneaters	
Dusty Ryan	September 4, 2008		Catcher	Detroit Tigers	
Jack Ryan (C)	September 2, 1889	October 4, 1913	Catcher	Louisville Colonels, Boston Beaneaters, Brooklyn Bridegrooms, Baltimore Orioles (19th century), St. Louis Cardinals, Washington Senators	
Jack Ryan (P)	July 2, 1908	May 9, 1911	Pitcher	Cleveland Naps, Boston Red Sox, Brooklyn Dodgers	
Jack Ryan (OF)	June 18, 1929	June 20, 1929	Outfielder	Boston Red Sox	
Jason Ryan	August 24, 1999	October 1, 2000	Pitcher	Minnesota Twins	
Jimmy Ryan	October 8, 1885	September 24, 1903	Outfielder	Chicago White Stockings, Chicago Pirates, Chicago Colts/Orphans, Washington Senators	
John Ryan	April 19, 1884	August 27, 1884	Pitcher	Baltimore Monumentals	
Johnny Ryan	August 19, 1873	July 12, 1877	Outfielder	Philadelphia White Stockings, Baltimore Canaries, New Haven Elm Citys, Louisville Grays, Cincinnati Reds (1876–1880)	
Ken Ryan	August 31, 1992	May 15, 1999	Pitcher	Boston Red Sox, Philadelphia Phillies	
Michael Ryan	September 20, 2002		Outfielder	Minnesota Twins, Los Angeles Angels of Anaheim	
Mike Ryan (3B)	July 25, 1895	July 27, 1895	Third baseman	St. Louis Browns (NL)	
Mike Ryan (C)	October 3, 1964	September 10, 1974	Catcher	Boston Red Sox, Philadelphia Phillies, Pittsburgh Pirates	
Nolan Ryan β	September 11, 1966	September 22, 1993	Pitcher	New York Mets, California Angels, Houston Astros, Texas Rangers	
Rob Ryan	August 20, 1999	October 7, 2001	Outfielder	Arizona Diamondbacks, Oakland Athletics	
Rosy Ryan	September 7, 1919	September 17, 1933	Pitcher	New York Giants, Boston Braves, New York Yankees, Brooklyn Dodgers	
Mike Ryba	September 22, 1935	August 29, 1946	Pitcher	St. Louis Cardinals, Boston Red Sox	
Tom Ryder	July 22, 1884	August 6, 1884	Outfielder	St. Louis Maroons	
Gene Rye	April 22, 1931	June 6, 1931	Outfielder	Boston Red Sox	
Gary Ryerson	June 28, 1972	September 3, 1973	Pitcher	Milwaukee Brewers	
Jae Kuk Ryu	May 14, 2006	April 9, 2008	Pitcher	Chicago Cubs, Tampa Bay Devil Rays/Rays	
Marc Rzepczynski	July 7, 2009		Pitcher	Toronto Blue Jays, St. Louis Cardinals	
