= Chuck Hartenstein =

American baseball player (1942–2021)

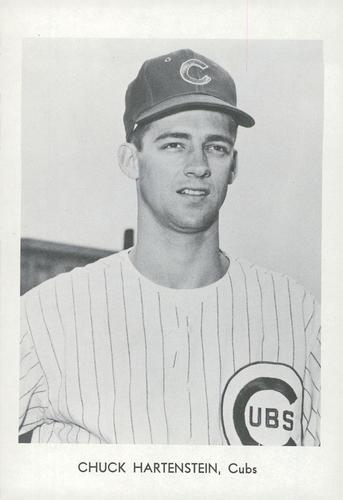
- Pitcher
- Born: May 26, 1942; Seguin, Texas, U.S.
- Died: October 2, 2021 (aged 79); Austin, Texas, U.S.
- Batted: Right Threw: Right

MLB debut
- September 11, 1965, for the Chicago Cubs

Last MLB appearance
- July 26, 1977, for the Toronto Blue Jays

MLB statistics
- Win–loss record: 17–19
- Earned run average: 4.52
- Strikeouts: 135
- Stats at Baseball Reference

Teams
- Chicago Cubs (1965–1968); Pittsburgh Pirates (1969–1970); St. Louis Cardinals (1970); Boston Red Sox (1970); Toronto Blue Jays (1977)

Charles Oscar "Twiggy" Hartenstein (May 26, 1942 – October 2, 2021) was an American professional baseball relief pitcher. He played in Major League Baseball (MLB) for five different teams between the 1966 and 1977 seasons. Listed at 5 ft 11 in (1.80 m), 165 lb (75 kg), Hartenstein batted and threw right-handed. He was signed by the Chicago Cubs in 1964 out of the University of Texas at Austin. He played for them until 1968, before joining the Pittsburgh Pirates (1969–70), St. Louis Cardinals (1970), Boston Red Sox (1970) and Toronto Blue Jays (1977).

== Career ==
A Texas Longhorns star pitcher, Hartenstein led his team to the 1962 and 1963 CWS tournaments.

After being signed by Chicago, he led the Texas League with a 2.19 ERA in 1965 while pitching for the Dallas–Fort Worth Spurs. On June 17, he turned in one of the most impressive pitching feats in Texas League history. In a game against the Austin Braves as the starter, the Spurs had a 1–0 lead going into the ninth inning when Hartenstein gave up a tying run. The game continued that way with Hartenstein pitching 18 innings. He allowed only one run, eight hits, walked four and struck out seven. The game continued through the 25th inning, with Austin winning 2–1. At the time, it was the longest game in Texas League history.

Hartenstein entered the majors in 1965 with the Cubs and appeared in one game as a pinch runner. Often called "Twiggy" because of his slender build, he produced a 9–5 record, 3.08 ERA and 10 saves in the 1967 season, which would be the best numbers of his career.

After Hartenstein struggled in the 1968 season, which he began with Triple A Tacoma, the Cubs traded him and Ron Campbell to the Pirates for Manny Jiménez on January 15, 1969. He rebounded to post a 5–4 record, 3.85 ERA and 10 saves in a career-high 95 2/3 innings pitched that season.

Hartenstein was dealt with Glenn Redmon from the Chicago White Sox to the San Francisco Giants for Skip Pitlock on February 8, 1973.

In a six-season career, Hartenstein posted a 17–19 record with a 3.63 ERA and 23 saves in 187 relief appearances, including 88 games finished, a 1.52 strikeout-to-walk ratio (135-to-89), and 297 innings of work.

After six years pitching in the minors, Hartenstein appeared in his last major league season with the expansion Toronto Blue Jays in 1977. His nickname was "Olde Frankenstein" there.

Following his playing career, Hartenstein coached for the Cleveland Indians (1979) and Milwaukee Brewers (1987–89). After he was fired by the Brewers, Hartenstein was hired to be a scout for the California Angels.

In 2004, Hartenstein was inducted into the Texas Athletics Hall of Honor. He died on October 2, 2021.
