= Skip Pitlock =

American baseball player (born 1947)

- Pitcher
- Born: November 6, 1947 (age 78); Hillside, Illinois, U.S.
- Batted: Left Threw: Left

MLB debut
- June 12, 1970, for the San Francisco Giants

Last MLB appearance
- April 10, 1975, for the Chicago White Sox

MLB statistics
- Win–loss record: 8–8
- Earned run average: 4.53
- Strikeouts: 124
- Stats at Baseball Reference

Teams
- San Francisco Giants (1970); Chicago White Sox (1974–1975)

Lee Patrick Thomas "Skip" Pitlock (born November 6, 1947) is an American former Major League Baseball pitcher. A left-hander noted for his unusual wind-up, he had a "herky-jerky" motion which deceived major league batters, and led to 124 career strikeouts in 1922/3 innings pitched. He was listed as 6 feet 2 inches (1.88 m) tall and 180 pounds (82 kg).

== Early years ==
Pitlock was born in Hillside, Illinois, and attended Immaculate Conception High School in Elmhurst, Illinois. Drafted by the San Francisco Giants in the eleventh round of the 1969 Major League Baseball draft out of Southern Illinois University, Pitlock went 10–2 with a 2.20 earned run average in his first professional season with the Pioneer League Great Falls Giants and California League Fresno Giants to jump all the way to triple A for his sophomore season.

== San Francisco Giants ==
Just about a year to the day after signing with the Giants, Pitlock earned his first call to the major leagues in June, 1970. Starting against Bob Gibson and the St. Louis Cardinals, Pitlock was tagged for four runs in the first three innings and took the loss in his major league debut. His finest performance was a complete game victory on August 3 against the Los Angeles Dodgers, in which he allowed two unearned runs on four hits and two walks while striking out nine. For the season, Pitlock went 5–5 with a 4.66 ERA in fifteen starts. He also made thirteen starts for the Phoenix Giants, going 10–3 with a 2.46 ERA.

He spent the next two seasons with Phoenix, going a combined 15–21 with a 4.93 ERA. Originally a starter when he signed with the Giants, Pitlock began seeing more work in relief in 1971 and 1972. He was traded from the Giants to the Chicago White Sox for Chuck Hartenstein and Glenn Redmon on February 8, 1973.

== Chicago White Sox ==
Pitlock went 8–8 with a 4.05 ERA for the Denver Bears in 1973. He earned a job in Chicago's bullpen out of spring training 1974, going 2–2 with a 4.01 ERA in 35 relief appearances, and earning his only career save on June 19 against the Cleveland Indians. He also made five starts, going 1–1 with a 6.20 ERA.

Pitlock faced just one major league batter, Billy Williams in 1975, and gave up an RBI single. He was 4–1 with a 3.91 ERA for the Denver Bears mostly in relief. He was dealt along with Stan Bahnsen from the White Sox to the Oakland Athletics for Dave Hamilton and Chet Lemon at the non-waiver trade deadline on June 15, 1975.

Upon his acquisition by the A's, he was assigned to the Pacific Coast League's Tucson Toros, and converted back into a starter. He spent one more season as a minor leaguer before retiring.

== Career stats ==
W	L	ERA	G	GS	CG	SV	IP	H	ER	R	HR	BB	K	WP	HBP	Avg.	Fld%
8	8	4.53	59	20	1	1	192.2	196	97	106	20	103	124	8	11	.080	.892

A below average fielder and hitter, Pitlock committed four errors in 1974, and struck out eighteen times in 25 career at-bats. His one career home run came on August 8, 1970, against Wade Blasingame of the Houston Astros.
