= Glenn Redmon =

American baseball player (born 1948)

- Infielder
- Born: January 11, 1948 (age 78); Detroit, Michigan, U.S.
- Batted: Right Threw: Right

MLB debut
- September 8, 1974, for the San Francisco Giants

Last MLB appearance
- October 2, 1974, for the San Francisco Giants

MLB statistics
- Games: 7
- Hits: 4
- Batting average: .235
- Stats at Baseball Reference

Teams
- San Francisco Giants (1974)

Glenn Vincent Redmon (born January 11, 1948) is an American former Major League Baseball second baseman who appeared in seven games for the San Francisco Giants in 1974. He batted and threw right-handed.

Redmon was drafted by the Chicago White Sox in the nineteenth round of the 1969 Major League Baseball draft out of the University of Michigan where he had been a member of Sigma Pi fraternity. While at Michigan, he spent the summers of 1967 and 1968 playing in Sturgis, South Dakota for the Sturgis Titans of the Basin League. In four seasons in Chicago's farm system, he batted .266 with 22 home runs. He was traded along with Chuck Hartenstein from the White Sox to the Giants for Skip Pitlock on February 8, 1973.

Redmon's finest season was 1974 with the Phoenix Giants when he batted .312 with six home runs and 76 runs batted in to earn a call up to San Francisco that September. He went 2-for-4 with two doubles and an RBI in his major league debut against the Atlanta Braves.
