= Prentice Redman =

American baseball player (born 1979)

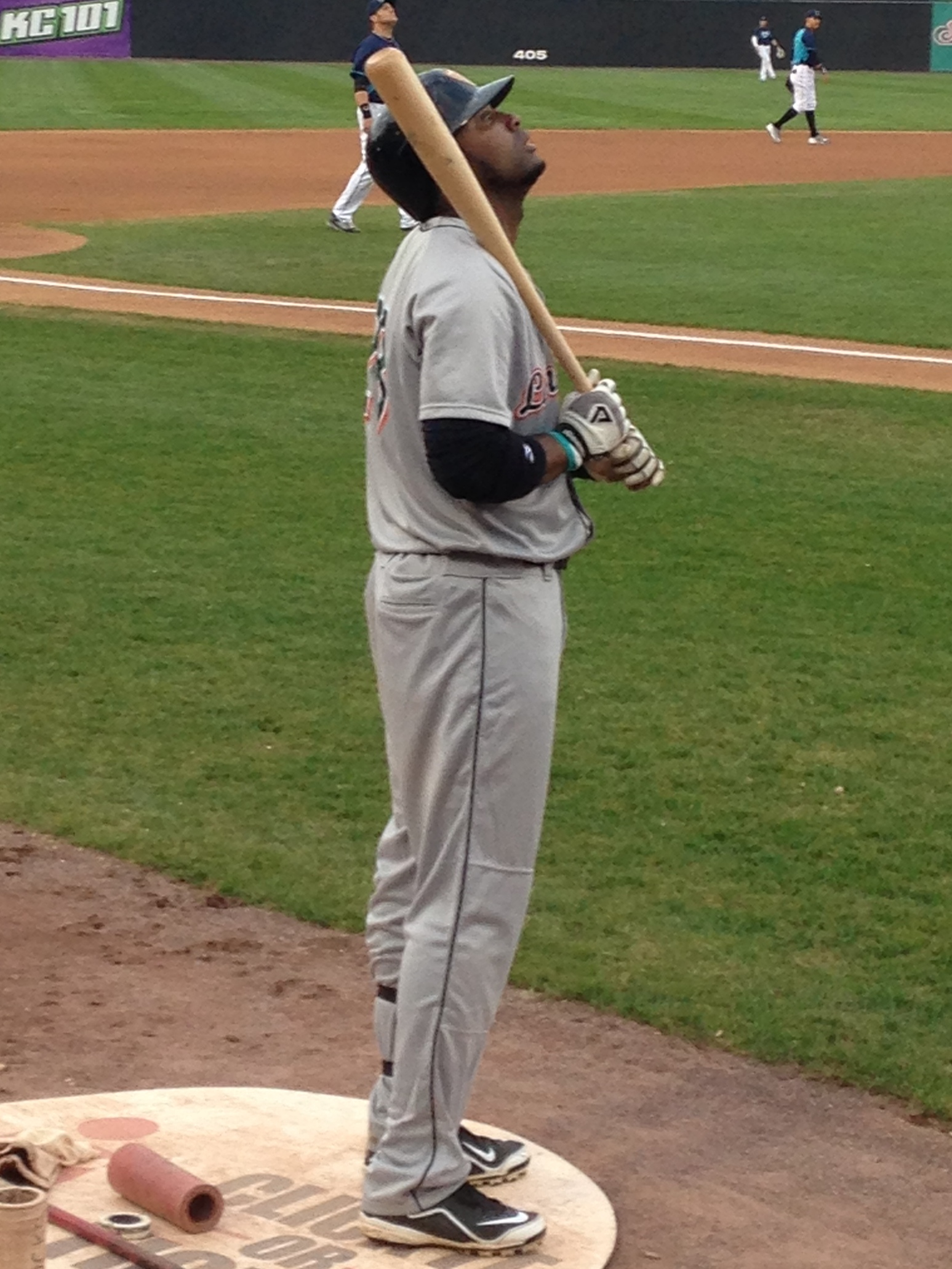
- Redman with the Long Island Ducks in 2015
- Outfielder
- Born: August 23, 1979 (age 46); Tuscaloosa, Alabama, U.S.
- Batted: Right Threw: Right

MLB debut
- August 24, 2003, for the New York Mets

Last MLB appearance
- September 28, 2003, for the New York Mets

MLB statistics
- Batting average: .125
- Home runs: 1
- Runs batted in: 2
- Stats at Baseball Reference

Teams
- New York Mets (2003)

Prentice Montezz Redman (born August 23, 1979) is an American former professional baseball outfielder. He played in Major League Baseball (MLB) for the New York Mets. He is the brother of former big league center fielder Tike Redman.

== Playing career ==
=== New York Mets ===
Redman was drafted by the New York Mets in the 10th round of the 1999 Major League Baseball draft. He played in high school at Tuscaloosa Academy and also attended Bevill State Community College. In 2001, while with the St. Lucie Mets, Redman was named to the Florida State League All-Star team.

Redman made his Major League debut on August 24, 2003, for the Mets against the Los Angeles Dodgers as a pinch runner. His first hit was a double against the Atlanta Braves, on September 2. Redman hit .125 over the course of 24 at bats for the Mets that season.

=== Minor Leagues ===
Redman left the Mets organization after the 2005 season and has since played in the farm systems of the Washington Nationals, St. Louis Cardinals, and from 2007 to 2009 with the Seattle Mariners. He hit .297 in 108 games for the AAA Tacoma Rainiers in 2009.

Redman signed a minor league contract, containing an invitation to spring training, with the Los Angeles Dodgers for 2010. He was assigned to the Triple-A Albuquerque Isotopes to start the season. On June 25, Redman was suspended for 50 games for testing positive for amphetamines. He was suspended for 100 games on July 26 for another failed drug test. The suspension was added onto the remaining games from Redman‘s previous suspension, costing him the rest of the season. In 61 games before his suspension, Redman hit .332, with 10 home runs, and 41 runs batted in (RBI).

=== Independent Leagues ===
In 2011, Redman played independent baseball with the Bridgeport Bluefish of the Atlantic League of Professional Baseball (APBL), the Kansas City T-Bones of the American Association, and the Olmecas de Tabasco of the Mexican League.

Redman re-signed with the Bluefish following the 2011 season and played there through the start of the 2015 season.

=== Long Island Ducks ===
On May 1, 2015, the Bridgeport Bluefish traded Redman to the Long Island Ducks for a player to be named later. Redman made his return to Bridgeport for the first time as a visitor on May 5, 2015; in his first at bat he hit a single against former teammate D. J. Mitchell. Redman was released on July 28, 2015, due to the Ducks’ acquisition of former (and future) MLB pitcher Rich Hill.
