= Tike Redman =

American baseball player (born 1977)

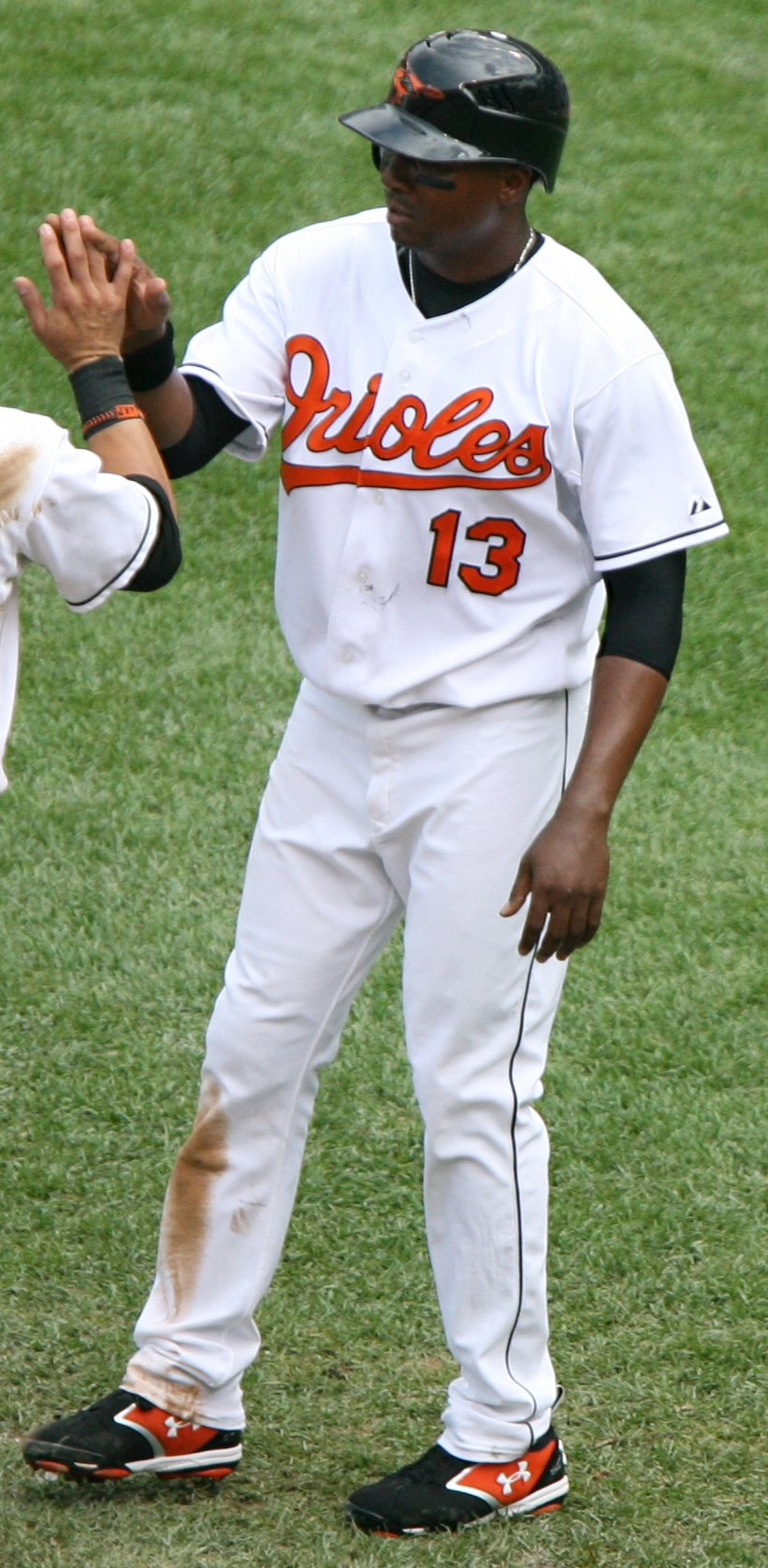
- Redman with the Baltimore Orioles in 2007
- Center fielder
- Born: March 10, 1977 (age 48); Tuscaloosa, Alabama, U.S.
- Batted: Left Threw: Left

MLB debut
- June 30, 2000, for the Pittsburgh Pirates

Last MLB appearance
- September 30, 2007, for the Baltimore Orioles

MLB statistics
- Batting average: .281
- Home runs: 17
- Runs batted in: 117
- Stats at Baseball Reference

Teams
- Pittsburgh Pirates (2000–2001, 2003–2005); Baltimore Orioles (2007)

Julian Jawonn "Tike" Redman (born March 10, 1977) is an American professional baseball center fielder, who played in Major League Baseball (MLB) for the Pittsburgh Pirates (2000–01; 2003–05) and the Baltimore Orioles (2007). He is the brother of former big league outfielder Prentice Redman.

== Early years ==
Prior to high school, Redman played little league baseball at Duncanville, Alabama against teams from Taylorville and Moundville. He attended Tuscaloosa Academy in Tuscaloosa, Alabama, and was a letterman in football, baseball, and track. He graduated from the school in 1996.

== Professional career ==
As of the end of the 2005 season, Redman had a .277 career batting average with 144 hits and 15 home runs in 392 games over 5 MLB seasons. In 2004, when he had the most playing time in his major league career, Redman batted .280 and hit 8 home runs; he also had 51 runs batted in (RBI) and 18 stolen bases, while getting caught stealing 6 times. Redman was designated for assignment on November 21, 2005, by the Pittsburgh Pirates after he had become expendable with the promotions of Nate McLouth and Chris Duffy to the major leagues.

Redman was officially acquired from Pittsburgh by the New York Mets for cash on November 28, 2005. While spending all of the 2006 season in the minor leagues with the Detroit Tigers and Houston Astros organizations, he had a batting average of .268 over 106 games. Redman posted 2 home runs, 19 RBI, and 16 stolen bases, while getting caught stealing 6 times.

Redman spent some time on the York Revolution of the Atlantic League (APBL) in 2007. He signed a minor league contract with the Baltimore Orioles on May 15, 2007. Redman batted .300, with 2 home runs, and 25 stolen bases in 79 games for their Triple-A Norfolk Tides, before having his contract purchased by the O's, on August 9.

Redman played as the Orioles' everyday center fielder for the rest of the 2007 season. He played in 40 games, batting .318 (42–132). Redman spent the entire 2008 season back at Norfolk and hit .292. He became a free agent after the season.

Redman joined the APBL Newark Bears in 2009 as their starting center fielder and leadoff hitter. On August 21, 2009, his contract was purchased by the Milwaukee Brewers; Redman was assigned to the Triple-A Nashville Sounds. He had previously played for the Sounds from 2000 to 2003, when they were affiliated with the Pirates. As of 2009, Redman holds the Sounds franchise record for the most triples, with 32.

On April 1, 2010, Redman was released by the Brewers. He then signed with the Olmecas de Tabasco of the Mexican League and played there through the 2011 season; in 2011, his brother Prentice Redman also briefly played with the club.
