= 1912 Chicago Green Sox season =

1912 Chicago Green Sox
- League: United States Baseball League
- Ballpark: Gunther Park (now Chase park)
- City: Chicago, IL
- Owners: Burt Keeley

The 1912 Chicago Green Sox season was the only season for the Green Sox of the United States Baseball League, a league that folded within a month of its creation. Chicago stood at 6th place by season's end with a 10–12 record.

== Regular season ==
=== Standings ===
United States Baseball League	Win	Loss	Pct
Pittsburgh Filipinos	19	7	.731
Richmond Rebels	15	11	.577
Reading (no name)	12	9	.571
Cincinnati Pippins	12	10	.545
Washington Senators	6	7	.462
Chicago Green Sox	10	12	.455
Cleveland Forest City	8	13	.381
New York Knickerbockers	2	15	.118

=== Roster ===
1912 Chicago Green Sox
Roster
Pitchers	Tom McGuire	Catchers: Ed McDonough; Infielders	Jim Stanley	Outfielders: Lou Gertenrich	Other	Robert Lynch; James McDonough; Henry Paynter; Al Schall	Manager: Burt Keeley
