= 1912 Richmond Rebels season =

1912 Richmond Rebels
- League: United States Baseball League
- Ballpark: Lee Park
- City: Richmond, VA
- Owners: Ernest C. Landgraf
- Managers: Alfred Newman

The 1912 Richmond Rebels season was the first and only season for the Rebels and the United States Baseball League, which collapsed after just over a month of play.

== Regular season ==
Few individual game results are known from that year. However, the Rebels defeated the Washington Senators on May 1, opening day, by a score of 2-0 before 9,000 fans. They also defeated New York (4-0) and Cincinnati (5-2) several days later.

=== Standings ===
United States Baseball League	Win	Loss	Pct
Pittsburgh Filipinos	19	7	.731
Richmond Rebels	15	11	.577
Reading (no name)	12	9	.571
Cincinnati Pippins	12	10	.545
Washington Senators	6	7	.462
Chicago Green Sox	10	12	.455
Cleveland Forest City	8	13	.381
New York Knickerbockers	2	15	.118

=== Roster ===
1912 Richmond Rebels
Roster
Pitchers	Catchers: Bert Blue; Infielders	Outfielders: Socks Seybold	Manager: Alfred Newman
