= List of baseball parks in New York City =

This is a list of ballparks used for professional baseball in the five boroughs of New York City. The information is a compilation of the information contained in the references listed.

== Brooklyn ==
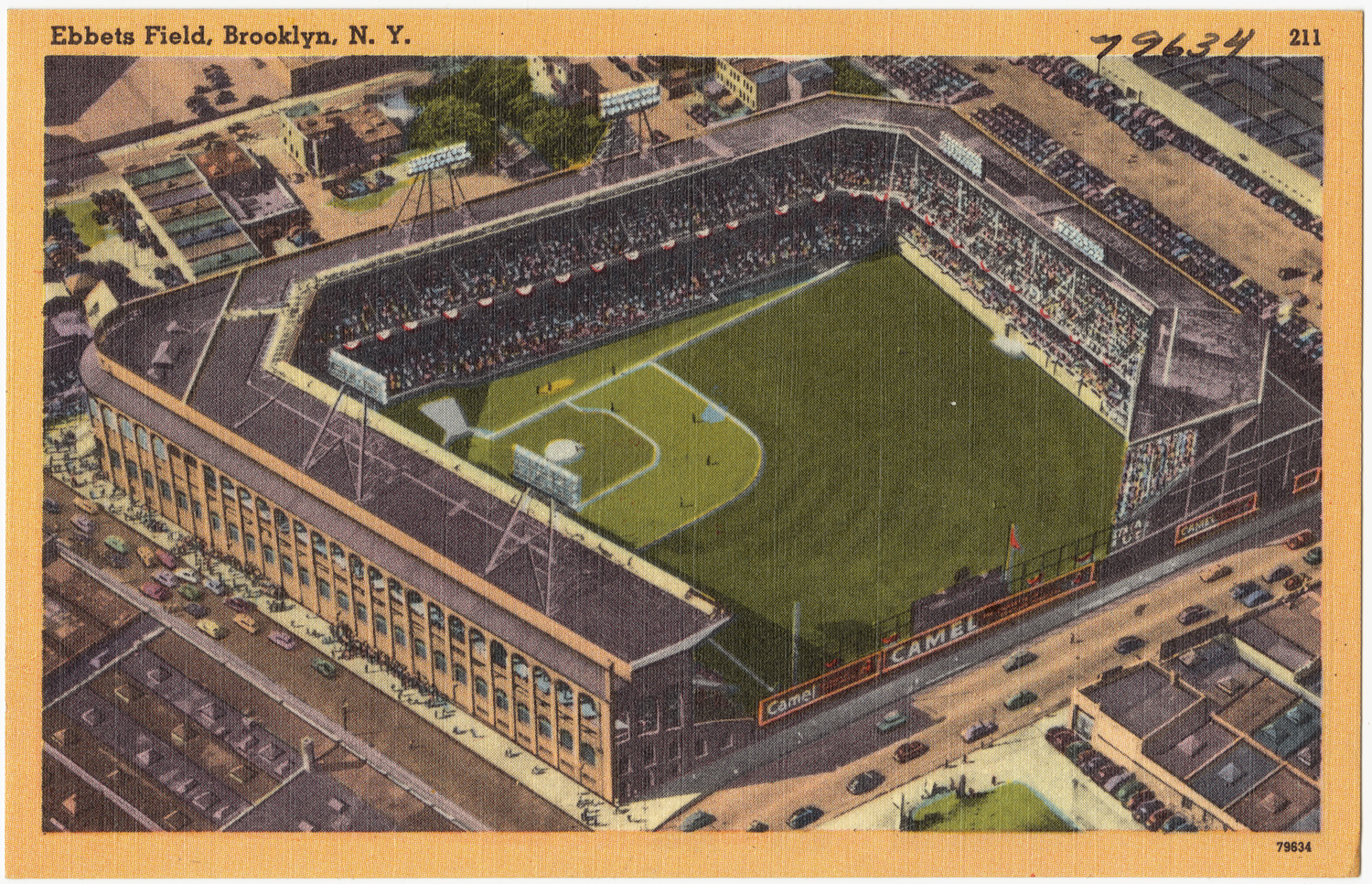
Ebbets Field

York Street Park
Home of: Atlantics – amateur (c. 1855–1865)
Location: Brooklyn – York Street
Currently: approach ramps for Brooklyn Bridge

Excelsior grounds (I)
Home of: Excelsior – amateur (1854–1859)
Location: Carroll Gardens, Brooklyn
Currently: residential

Excelsior grounds (II)
Home of: Excelsior – am/pro independent (1859–1870)
Location: Red Hook, Brooklyn – south end of Court Street, on the waterfront (Gowanus Canal)
Currently: industrial

Union Grounds
Home of:

Eckford – independent am/pro (1862–1871), NA (1872)
Mutual – independent am/pro (1868–1870), NA (1871-75), NL (1876)
Atlantic – NA (1873–1875)
"Hartford of Brooklyn" – NL (1877)
several single-game "home" games by other clubs

Location: Williamsburg, Brooklyn – Marcy Avenue (southwest, center field); Rutledge Street (northwest, right field); Harrison Avenue (northeast, home plate); Lynch Street (southeast, left field)
Currently: National Guard building, Juan Morel Campos Secondary School

Capitoline Grounds
Home of:

Atlantic – am/pro independent (1864 or 1865 – 1871), NA (1872)
Excelsior – am/pro independent (1866–1871)
Enterprise – am independent (c. 1864–1866)

Location: Bedford, Brooklyn – Marcy Avenue (east); Halsey Street (south); Putnam Avenue (north); Nostrand Avenue (west)

– less than 1.5 miles south of Union Grounds along Marcy

Currently: Residential

Washington Park I
Home of: Brooklyn Atlantics/Bridegrooms/Trolley Dodgers – Inter-State League (1883), AA (1884–1889), NL (1890–1891 part)

Also used as a neutral site for two games in the 1887 World Series and one game in the 1888 World Series

Location: Park Slope, Brooklyn – 3rd Street (north, right field) and 5th Street (south, left field); 4th Avenue (west, center field) and 5th Avenue (east, home plate)
Currently: Residential, school, public park, and Gowanus House

Eastern Park
Home of:

Brooklyn Ward's Wonders – PL (1890)
Brooklyn Dodgers (1891 part – 1897)

Location: Brownsville, Brooklyn – Eastern Parkway (segment later renamed Pitkin Avenue when Eastern was diverted) (north, home plate); Long Island Railroad and Vesta Avenue (later renamed Van Sinderen Street) (east, left field); Sutter Avenue (south, center field); Powell Street (west, right field)
Currently: Commercial / industrial

Washington Park II
Home of:

Brooklyn Dodgers/Superbas – NL (1898–1912)
Brooklyn Tip-Tops – FL (1914–1915)

Location: Park Slope, Brooklyn – diagonally across from the northwest corner of the previous Washington Park: 1st Street (north, right field) and 3rd Street (south, third base); 3rd Avenue (west, left field) and 4th Avenue (east, first base)
Currently: Consolidated Edison – part of ballpark wall still stands

Ebbets Field
Home of: Brooklyn Dodgers – NL (1913–1957)
Location: Brooklyn – formerly within Flatbush, now considered part of Crown Heights – 55 Sullivan Place – Bedford Avenue (east, right field); Sullivan Place (south, first base); McKeever Place (originally Cedar Place) (west, third base); Montgomery Street (north, left field)
Currently: Jackie Robinson Apartments

Maimonides Park prev. Key Span Park, MCU Park
Home of: Brooklyn Cyclones – New York–Penn League (2001–present)
Location: Coney Island site, Brooklyn – 1904 Surf Avenue – Surf Avenue (north, third base); Kensington Walk (east, left field); Boardwalk (south, right field); West 19th Street (west, first base)

== Manhattan ==
Polo Grounds (I)
Home of:

Metropolitan – independent (1880–1882), AA (1883–1885)
New York Giants – NL (1883–1888)
Also used as a neutral site for one game in the 1887 World Series

Location: 110th Street (south, first base for Mets, third base for Giants); Fifth Avenue (east, first base for Giants); Sixth Avenue (renamed Lenox Avenue and since double-named as Malcolm X Boulevard) (west, third base for Mets); 112th Street (north, left field for Mets, right field for Giants)
Currently: Commercial and residential buildings, Harlem Academy

Metropolitan Park
Home of: Metropolitan – AA (1884 first part of season)
Location: Manhattan – 109th Street (north); Harlem River (east); 107th Street (south); First Avenue (west)
Currently: Residential, commercial, public school

Manhattan Field aka Polo Grounds (II)
Home of: New York Giants (1889 part – 1890)
Location: 155th Street (south, third base); Eighth Avenue (east, first base) – next to site of Polo Grounds
Currently: Apartment buildings

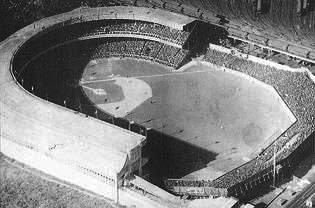
Polo Grounds as it looked 1911–1923

Polo Grounds (III) / (IV) orig. Brotherhood Park
Home of:

New York Giants – PL (1890)
New York Giants – NL (1891–1957)
New York Yankees – AL (1913–1922)
New York Mets – NL (1962–1963)

Location: Harlem River Drive aka Speedway (west, home plate); site of Manhattan Field and 155th Street viaduct (south, right field); 8th Avenue (east, center field); rail yards and later public housing (north, left field)
Currently: Apartment buildings

Olympia Field
Home of: local ball clubs (about 1901–1904)
Location: between 135th and 136th Streets, and Lenox Avenue (a.k.a. Malcolm X Boulevard), based on contemporary newspaper articles
Currently: Harlem Hospital Center, fire station, elementary school, and Howard Bennett Playground

Olympic Field
Home of: local ball clubs starting 1904; Lincoln Giants – independent (1911–1919)
Location: 136th Street, Fifth Avenue, and Madison Avenue, based on contemporary newspaper articles
Currently: medical buildings

Dyckman Oval
Home of:

Cuban Stars (East) – independent 1916–1922 / Eastern Colored League 1923–1928 / American Negro League 1929 only / independent 1930–1933
also various neutral-site games by other Negro league clubs

Location: Inwood section of Manhattan. Roughly triangular block bounded by Nagle Avenue and elevated tracks (northwest, third base); 204th Street (northeast, left field); 10th Avenue (southeast, right field); and Academy Street (southwest, first base). Existed from about 1915 through 1937.
Currently: NYCHA apartment buildings and Monsignor Kett Playground.

Hilltop Park formally American League Park
Home of:

New York Yankees – AL (1903–1912)
New York Giants – NL (1911 part)

Location: Washington Heights, Manhattan – Broadway (southeast, right field); West 165th Street (southwest, first base); Fort Washington Avenue (west, third base); 168th Street (northeast, left field)
Currently: NewYork–Presbyterian Hospital and other medical buildings

== Bronx ==
Yankee Stadium and Polo Grounds, as they looked in April 1923

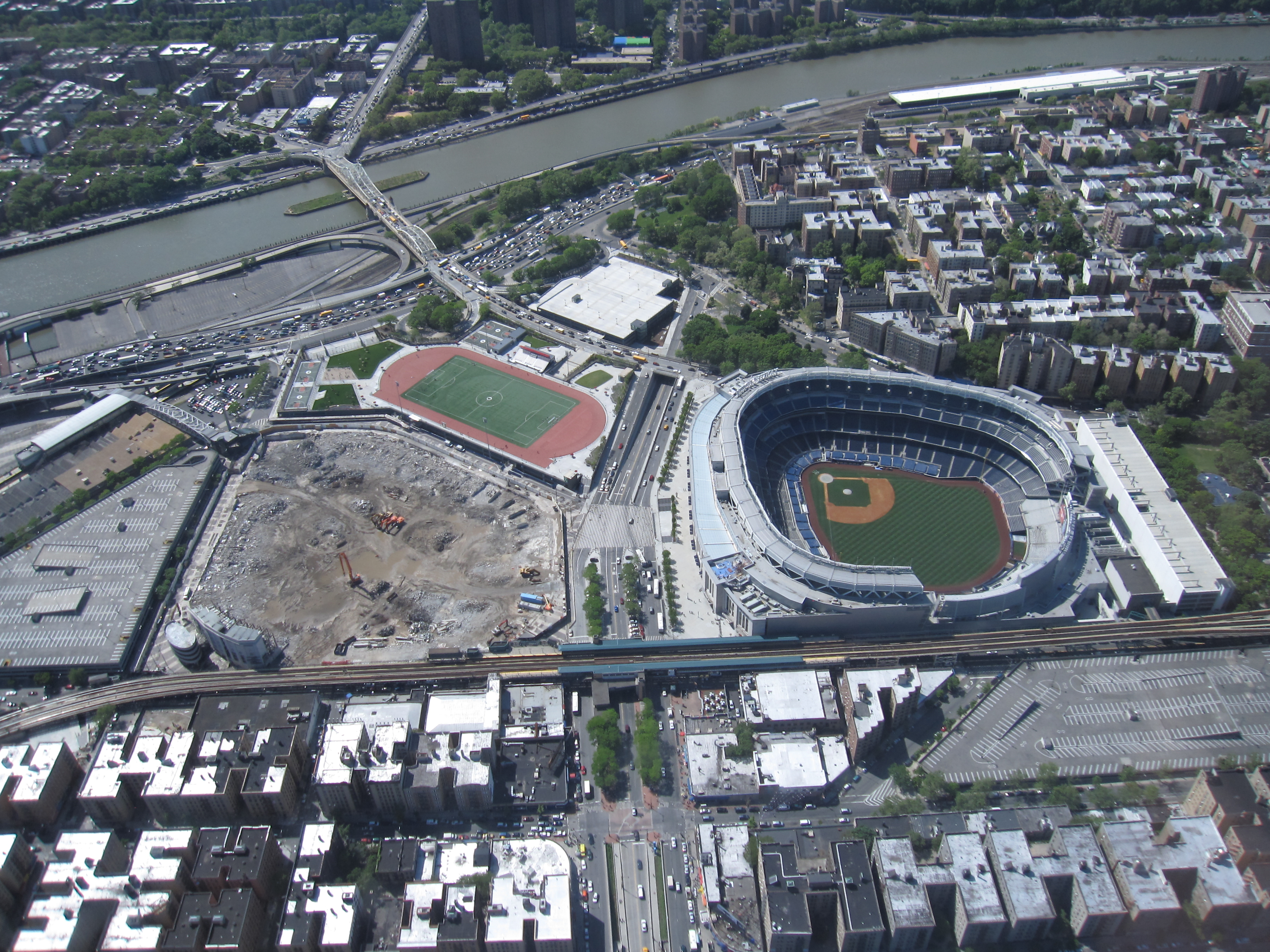
Similar angle to 1923 picture, in 2010

Bronx Oval
Home of: New York Knickerbockers – United States Baseball League (1912 only)

Used for independent baseball and other sports as early as 1905, per local newspaper accounts.

Location: Bronx – 163rd Street and Southern Boulevard, as well as Hunt's Point Road
Currently: Commercial businesses

Interborough Field (circa 1914-1950)
NYC Transit All Stars

Used for transit league games, built just north of IRT railyards 240th st (first base) and west side of Broadway (right field).

https://collections.mcny.org/CS.aspx?VP3=DamView&VBID=24UP1GQ0XG7YW&SMLS=1&RW=1512&RH=784

Catholic Protectory Oval or Catholic Protectory Field
Home of: Lincoln Giants – independent (1920–1922) / Eastern Colored League (1923–1928) / American Negro League (1929 only)
Location: part of the campus of the New York Catholic Protectory, which was southeast of East Tremont Avenue and Unionport Road; the ballpark site is close to where Unionport intersects with Metropolitan Avenue
Currently: Parkchester

Yankee Stadium (I)
Home of: New York Yankees – AL (1923–1973, 1976–2008)
Location: Bronx – East 161st Street (north, left field); River Avenue (east, right field); 157th Street (south, first base); Macombs Dam Park (west, third base)
Currently: Macombs Dam Park, Heritage Field

Yankee Stadium (II)
Home of: New York Yankees – AL (2009–present)
Location: Bronx – across the street to the north from the old Yankee Stadium – East 161st Street (south, first base); River Avenue (east, right field); Macombs Dam Bridge / Jerome Avenue (west, third base); East 164th Street (north, left field)

== Queens ==
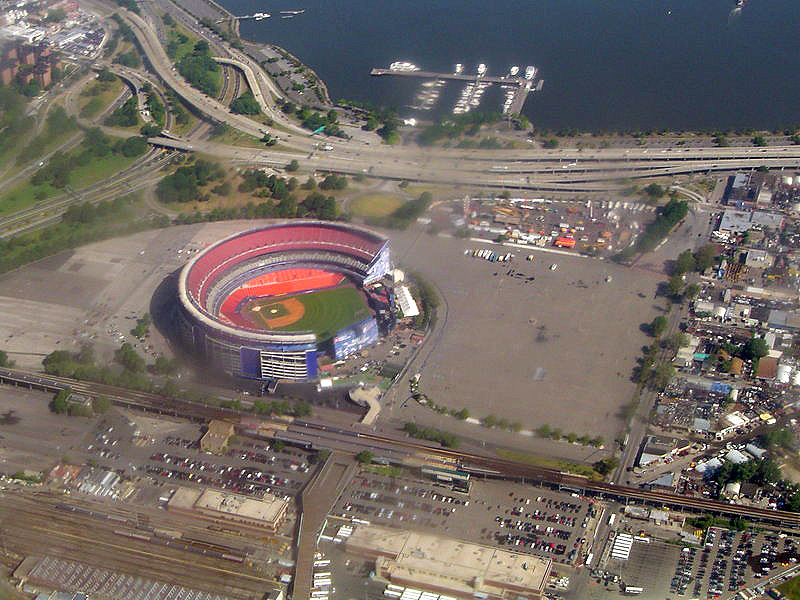
Shea Stadium and parking lot (future site of Citi Field) in 2005

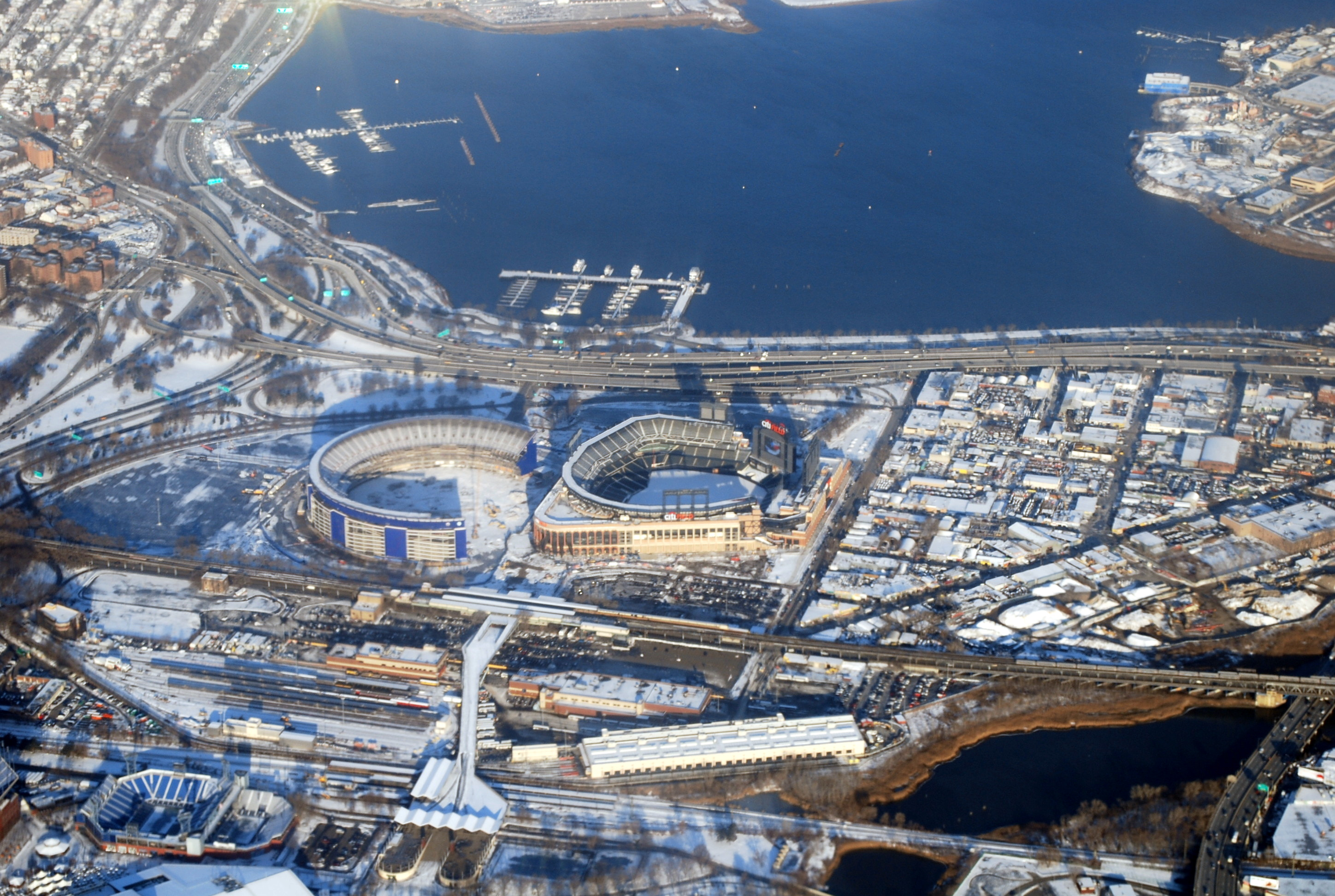
Shea Stadium and Citi Field, in 2008

Fashion Race Course originally National Race Course
Home of: Operated as a horse race track 1853 to about 1869. Site of an intra-city all-star game series in 1858 on July 20, August 17 and September 10; notable as first admission charges for baseball.
Location: gate at what is now 37th Avenue and 103rd Street in Corona, Queens, New York, about a mile west-southwest of Citi Field.
Currently: commercial / residential

Grauer’s Ridgewood Park
Home of: Brooklyn Bridegrooms/Trolley Dodgers AA (1886 Sundays only)
Location: part of a large park bounded by Myrtle Avenue (north); Seneca Avenue (northeast); Decatur Street (southeast); Cypress Avenue (southwest)
Currently: commercial / residential

Wallace’s Ridgewood Park
Home of:

Brooklyn Bridegrooms/Trolley Dodgers AA (1887–1889 Sundays only)
Brooklyn Gladiators AA (1890)

Location: Long Island Railroad tracks & Wyckoff Avenue (northeast, right field); Covert Street (southeast, first base); Irving Avenue (southwest, third base); Halsey Street (northwest, left field) – a few blocks south of Grauer's Ridgewood Park
Currently: commercial

Long Island Grounds
Home of: Brooklyn Gladiators AA (1890 – 2 Sunday games)
Location: (Maspeth, New York) Grand Avenue (south); 57th Street (east)
Currently: industrial

Meyerrose Park
Home of: Brooklyn – Atlantic League (1907) / Union League (1908)
Location: Cornelia Street & Woodward Avenue
Currently: commercial

Dexter Park
Home of: Brooklyn Royal Giants – Negro leagues (1920s–1930s)
Location: Woodhaven, Queens – Jamaica Avenue (south); Eldert Lane T's into Jamaica from the south
Currently: residential

Shea Stadium
Home of:

New York Mets – NL (1964–2008)
New York Yankees – AL (1974-75)

Location: Flushing, Queens – 123-01 Roosevelt Avenue – 126th Street (northeast, right field); Roosevelt Avenue (southeast, first base); Shea Road (southwest/northwest, third base/left field)
Currently: Parking lot for Citi Field

The Ballpark at St. John's now known as Jack Kaiser Stadium
Home of: Brooklyn Cyclones – New York–Penn League (2000)
Location: Jamaica, Queens – St. John's University campus – Utopia Parkway (east, outfield); 175th Street (west/south, home plate/first base); Belson Stadium soccer field and Union Turnpike (northwest, third base)

Citi Field
Home of: New York Mets – NL (2009–present)
Location: Flushing, Queens – just east of Shea Stadium site – Seaver Way (northeast, right field); Roosevelt Avenue (southeast, first base); Shea Road (southwest/northwest, third base/left field)

== Staten Island ==
St. George Grounds
Home of:

Metropolitan – AA (1886–1887)
New York Giants – NL (1889) partial season

Location: St. George, Staten Island, Staten Island
Currently: Near site of Richmond County Bank Ballpark

SIUH Community Park
Home of: Staten Island Yankees – New York–Penn League (2001–2020), Staten Island FerryHawks – Atlantic League (2021–present)
Location: St. George, Staten Island – Richmond Terrace (southwest, home plate/third base); Bank Street (southeast/northeast, first base/right field); Upper New York Bay, beyond Bank Street

== See also ==
- Lists of baseball parks

== Sources ==
- Peter Filichia, Professional Baseball Franchises, Facts on File, 1993.
- Benson, Michael (1989). Ballparks of North America: A Comprehensive Historical Reference to Baseball Grounds, Yards, and Stadiums, 1845 to present. Jefferson, N.C.: McFarland. ISBN 0-89950-367-5.
- Lowry, Philip J. (1992). Green Cathedrals: The Ultimate Celebration of All 271 Major League and Negro League Ballparks Past and Present. Reading, Massachusetts: Addison-Wesley. ISBN 0-201-56777-6.
- Baseball Memories, by Marc Okkonen, Sterling Publishing, 1992.
