= Chicago Green Sox =

Information
- Location: Chicago, Illinois
- Ballpark: Gunther Park (now Chase Park)
- Founded: 1912
- Disbanded: 1912
- League championships: None
- Former league(s): United States Baseball League
- Ownership: William Niesen
- Manager: Burt Keeley

The Chicago Green Sox were a short-lived franchise of the United States Baseball League. The eight-team league ceased operations after just over a month of play in 1912.

== 1912 Standings ==
In the Green Sox and the USBL's only season, Chicago finished 6th place with a 10–12 record.

Team	Win	Loss	Pct
Pittsburgh Filipinos	19	7	.731
Richmond Rebels	15	11	.577
Reading (no name)	12	9	.571
Cincinnati Cams	12	10	.545
Washington Senators	6	7	.462
Chicago Green Sox	10	12	.455
Cleveland Forest City	8	13	.381
New York Knickerbockers	2	15	.118

== Notable alumni ==
- Lou Gertenrich (1912)
- Ernie Johnson (1912)
- Burt Keeley (1912, MGR)
- Ed McDonough (1912)
- Tom McGuire (1912)
- Jim Stanley (1912)

=== See also ===
Chicago Green Sox players
