= History of professional baseball in Washington, D.C. =

Washington, D.C., has been home to over a dozen baseball organizations beginning in 1872, and since 2005 has been represented in Major League Baseball (MLB) by the Washington Nationals.

== Early years: 1867–1899 ==
The first professional baseball teams and leagues were formed in the late 19th century and several were based in Washington, D.C. Many early teams used the names "Nationals" and "Senators" but were otherwise unrelated.

- The National Base Ball Club of Washington, D.C. (1867)
- The National Association Washington Olympics (1871–1872)
- The National Association Washington Nationals (1872)
- The National Association Washington Blue Legs (1873)
- The National Association Washington Nationals (1875)
- The Union Association Washington Nationals (1884)
- The American Association Washington Nationals (1884)
- The National League Washington Nationals (1886–1889)
- The American Association Washington Statesmen (1891)
- The National League Washington Senators (1892–1899)

== "First in war, first in peace, and last in the American League": 1901–1971 ==
1902 Logo

Washington was continuously home to a major league baseball team from 1901 until 1971. Two separate franchises alternated between the nicknames "Senators" and "Nationals" and sometimes used the names interchangeably.

- The American League Washington Nationals/Senators (1901–1960): The team was officially the "Senators" from 1901 to 1904, the "Nationals" from 1905 to 1955 and the Senators again from 1956 to 1960 but nonetheless was commonly referred to as the Senators throughout its history (and unofficially as the "Grifs" during Clark Griffith's tenure as manager from 1912 to 1920). In 1961, this team moved to Minneapolis-St. Paul and became the Minnesota Twins.
- The American League Washington Senators (1961–1971): This expansion team began play in Washington immediately following the departure of the former franchise. In 1972, this team moved to Dallas–Fort Worth and became the Texas Rangers.

Since the expansion franchise began play the year immediately after the original franchise's final year in Washington, and because they both used the same nickname, the teams are commonly confused or combined and photographs are often dated based on player uniforms. The original club used dark blue as its primary color, with a thick, sans-serif, red or white block "W" on its caps. The expansion club mainly used caps with a stylized cursive "W," first in blue with a red letter (1963–1967), then in red with a white letter (1968–1971), similar to the current Washington Nationals. In 1961–1962, the expansion Senators wore dark blue caps with a sans-serif block "W" outlined in white, nearly identical to the caps of the original Senators save for a red button at the top of the cap. Varying shades of the Senators' red, white and blue colors are still used by their successor teams in Minnesota and Texas.

Two other teams also competed in Washington during this time period.

- The United States Baseball League Washington Senators (1912): This club was unrelated to the American League team and the new league folded after one month of operation.
- The Negro National League Homestead Grays (1930–1948): Though officially based in Homestead, Pennsylvania, this club played many of its games in Washington and were informally known as the "Washington Homestead Grays." When baseball returned to Washington in 2005, "Grays" was one of the three finalists for the team's nickname.

== Return: since 2005 ==
Major League Baseball returned to Washington in 2005 after a 33-year absence.

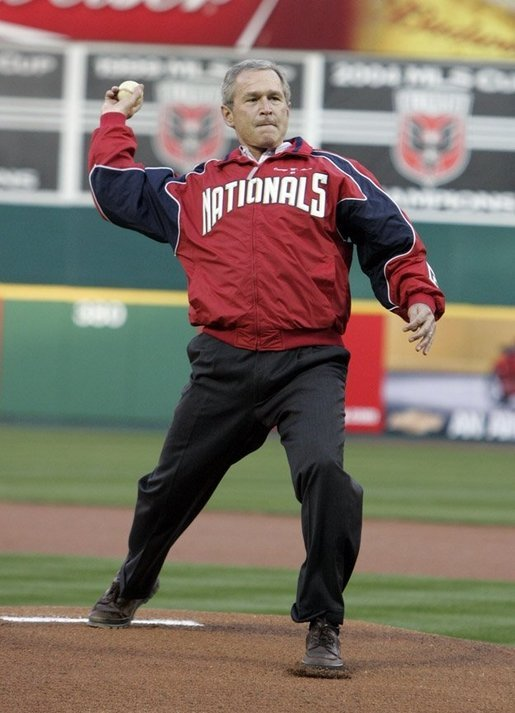
President George W. Bush throws the ceremonial first pitch upon baseball's return to Washington, D.C. in 2005.

- The National League Washington Nationals (2005–present): The Montreal Expos, under the ownership of Major League Baseball, were relocated to Washington and sold to a new ownership group.

The Nationals adopted similar colors to the 1968–1971 Senators adding gold accents to a tilted version of the expansion Senators cursive "W" logo.

In 2012, the Nationals won the NL East division championship and brought postseason baseball to Washington, D.C., for the first time in 79 years.

In 2014, the Nationals won their second NL East division championship in three years after defeating the Atlanta Braves, 3–0, on September 16, 2014. In the NLDS of the same year, the Nationals lost to the San Francisco Giants, who went on to win the World Series.

In 2019, the Washington Nationals won the Wild Card game, defeated the Los Angeles Dodgers in the NLDS, defeated the St. Louis Cardinals in the NL Championship Series, and then on October 30 won their first franchise World Series, defeating the American League champion Houston Astros in an historic matchup where neither team won a home game.

== See also ==
- Sports in Washington, D.C.
