= Jason Riley (trainer) =

American athletic trainer (born 1975)

- Born: 1975 (age 50–51); Omaha, Nebraska, U.S.
- Education: University of Nebraska–Lincoln

Jason Riley is an athletic trainer and nutritionist. He has trained athletes in the NFL, MLB, NHL, professional tennis players, and Olympians.

== Early life and education ==
Riley is a native of Omaha, Nebraska, and he graduated from the University of Nebraska–Lincoln, earning a degree in kinesiology and exercise science. During college, he helped train the Nebraska Cornhuskers football team, which won three national championships (1994, 1995, and 1997).

== Career ==
In 2000, Riley moved to Florida to work at IMG Academy. He initially sought out to become a physical therapist before his time at IMG.

In 2009, Riley, Charlie Sly, and Janis Krums co-founded Elementz Nutrition, a nutritional supplement company. He was largely credited for Derek Jeter's career resurgence, having trained Jeter from before the 2008 season to his retirement in 2014. Riley's training was praised by Men's Fitness magazine, calling him "baseball's M.V.P. of the post-steroids era". Riley targets specific weaknesses of each athlete, while also working to integrate those new routines into a mindful practice for the whole body.

In 2014, Riley was part of the opening of a new gym, the Performance Compound, with former NFL players Llewellyn “Yo” Murphy and Anthony “Booger” McFarland, and Scott Lee, who worked with HealthEdge Investment Partners at the time. Riley was sued by Murphy and McFarland, who alleged that Riley was stealing clients and sabotaging marketing efforts. Riley denied these claims, and the lawsuit was eventually dropped.

In the 2016 Al Jazeera America sports doping report, which was documented in The Dark Side: Secrets of the Sports Dopers, Charlie Sly, the pharmacist connected to the distribution of HGH to professional athletes, used Riley's home address when applying for a pharmacist license. Nearly all the athletic clients that Sly named in a recorded interview were connected to Riley. Riley was not named or cited by the documentary and would later deny any involvement with banned substances. In the MLB's report on the documentary, the league did not find any proof that Riley engaged in any wrongdoing.

Riley is the director of the Positive Sports Lab, which is based in Florida. He has previously worked with the Division II North American Soccer League, and served as the director of performance at the Saddlebrook Resort.

=== Athletes ===
List of athletes trained
Athlete	Source
Derek Jeter	
Tyler Clippard	
Ryan Howard	
Ryan Zimmerman	
Grant McCray	
Sammy Watkins	
Mike Neal	
Dustin Keller	
Rex Grossman	
Dante Fowler	
Allen Robinson	
Sedrick Ellis	
Maria Sharapova	
Tommy Haas	
John Isner	
Summer McIntosh	
Brad Richards	

== Personal life ==
Riley is a devout Christian.
