= Jack Cronin =

American baseball player (1874–1929)

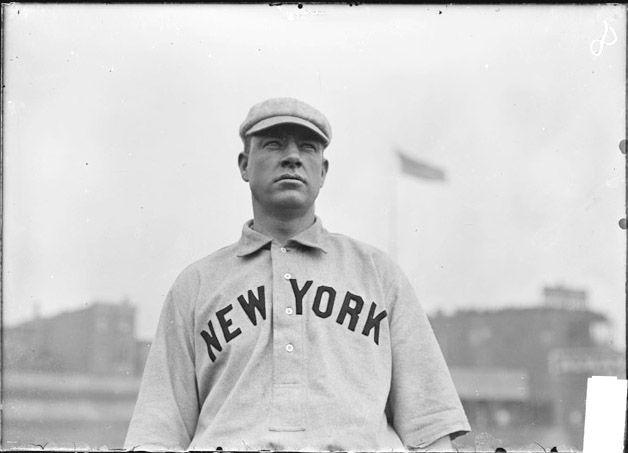
- Pitcher
- Born: May 26, 1874; West New Brighton, New York, U.S.
- Died: July 12, 1929 (aged 55); Middletown, New York, U.S.
- Batted: Right Threw: Right

MLB debut
- August 24, 1895, for the Brooklyn Grooms

Last MLB appearance
- October 3, 1904, for the Brooklyn Superbas

MLB statistics
- Win–loss record: 43–58
- Earned run average: 3.40
- Strikeouts: 318
- Stats at Baseball Reference

Teams
- Brooklyn Grooms (1895); Pittsburgh Pirates (1898); Cincinnati Reds (1899); Detroit Tigers (1901–1902); Baltimore Orioles (1902); New York Giants (1902–1903); Brooklyn Superbas (1904)

John J. Cronin (May 26, 1874 – July 12, 1929) was an American Major League Baseball (MLB) pitcher. He played professionally from 1895 through 1912. His MLB career included stints with the Brooklyn Grooms (1895), Pittsburgh Pirates (1898), Cincinnati Reds (1899), Detroit Tigers (1901–1902), Baltimore Orioles (1902), New York Giants (1902–1903), and Brooklyn Superbas (1904).

== Career ==
Cronin began his professional career pitching in two games for the Hartford Bluebirds of the Connecticut State League in July 1895. He signed with the Brooklyn Grooms, appearing in two games before receiving his release in September.

In May 1896, Cronin pitched for Pottsville of the Class-B Pennsylvania State League, before joining the New York Metropolitans of the Class-A Atlantic League, where he pitched from June through July. He signed with the Bangor Millionaires of the Maine State League in 1897, and joined the Fall River Indians of the New England League in July 1897. He pitched for Fall River through July 8, 1898, when he was purchased by the Pittsburgh Pirates of the National League (NL).

Released from the Pirates, Cronin joined the Detroit Tigers, then in the Class-A Western League in 1899. On September 18, 1899, the Cincinnati Reds of the (NL) purchased Cronin from Detroit. In April 1900, they returned Cronin to Detroit, now a member of the American League.

Cronin was released by the Tigers on June 8, 1902, and he signed with the Baltimore Orioles that same day. However, the Orioles struggled with debt. Joe Kelley, star player for the Orioles and son-in-law of part-owner John Mahon, reported that the team owed as much as $12,000 ($446,538 in current dollar terms). Unable to afford that debt, Mahon purchased shares of the team from Kelley and player-manager John McGraw. With this, Mahon became the majority shareholder, owning 201 of the team's 400 shares. On July 17, 1902, Mahon sold his interest in the Orioles to Andrew Freedman, principal owner of the Giants of the NL, and John T. Brush, principal owner of the Cincinnati Reds, also of the NL. That day, Freedman released Cronin, Kelley, Dan McGann, Cy Seymour, Roger Bresnahan, and Joe McGinnity from their contracts with Orioles. Freedman signed Cronin, McGann, Bresnahan, and McGinnity and to the Giants, joining McGraw, who had signed with the Giants ten days earlier. Brush signed Seymour and Kelley to the Reds.

After the 1903 season, on December 12, 1903, the Giants traded Cronin with Charlie Babb and $6,000 ($215,000 in current dollar terms) to the Brooklyn Superbas for Bill Dahlen. Cronin pitched for the Superbas in 1904. Released after the season, Cronin returned to minor league baseball. He signed with the Providence Clamdiggers, later known as the Providence Grays, of the Eastern League in 1905, and pitched for them through 1910. He then joined the Buffalo Bisons. In 1912, Cronin pitched for Reading of the outlaw United States Baseball League.
