= New York Knickerbockers (1912) =

Information
- League: United States Baseball League
- Location: New York, NY
- Ballpark: Bronx Oval
- Founded: 1912
- Disbanded: 1912
- League championships: None
- Former name: Knickerbockers (1912)
- Colors: Cream, white, gray, black
- Ownership: Charles White
- Manager: William Jordon

The New York Knickerbockers was one of 8 teams in the short-lived United States Baseball League, which collapsed after just over a month of play. The Knickerbockers were owned by Charles White and managed by William Jordon.

== 1912 Standings ==
Team	Win	Loss	Pct
Pittsburgh Filipinos	19	7	.731
Richmond Rebels	15	11	.577
Reading (no nickname)	12	9	.571
Cincinnati Cams	12	10	.545
Washington Senators	6	7	.462
Chicago Green Sox	10	12	.455
Cleveland Forest City	8	13	.381
New York Knickerbockers	2	15	.118

New York finished dead last in the standings at the end at 2–15. They were the first USBL team to fold, doing so on May 28.

== 1912 New York Knickerbockers season ==
1912 New York Knickerbockers
- League: United States Baseball League
- Ballpark: Bronx Oval
- City: New York, NY
- Owners: Charles White
- Managers: Ambrose Hussey Jr. and Sr.

The 1912 New York Knickerbockers season was the first and only season for the club. They folded with the United States Baseball League after about a month of play.

=== Regular season ===
Of the few individual game results known from that season, it is known that on opening day, May 1, 1912, the Knickerbockers battled with Reading to a 10–10 tie in 10 innings. The game was called due to darkness. New York eventually ended up last in the USBL standings.

=== Standings ===
United States Baseball League	Win	Loss	Pct
Pittsburgh Filipinos	19	7	.731
Richmond Rebels	15	11	.577
Reading (no name)	12	9	.571
Cincinnati Cams	12	10	.545
Washington Senators	6	7	.462
Chicago Green Sox	10	12	.455
Cleveland Forest City	8	13	.381
New York Knickerbockers	2	15	.118

=== Roster ===
1912 New York Knickerbockers
Roster
Pitchers	Catchers: Joe Wall; Infielders	Outfielders	Managers: Ambrose Hussey, Jr. & Ambrose Hussey, Sr.

== Notable players ==
- Joe Wall
