= The Dark Side: Secrets of the Sports Dopers =

"The Dark Side: Secrets of the Sports Dopers", investigating professional athletes' possible use of performance-enhancing substances, is an episode of Al Jazeera Investigates which was broadcast by Al Jazeera English and Al Jazeera America. The documentary identified Peyton Manning, Ryan Howard, Ryan Zimmerman, James Harrison, and Clay Matthews III.

== Content ==
On December 27, 2015, Al Jazeera English and Al Jazeera America released a report conducted by the Al Jazeera Investigative Unit called The Dark Side: Secrets of the Sports Dopers which investigated professional athletes' potential use of Performance-enhancing drugs (PEDs) naming several prominent athletes as having received drugs from Charles Sly, a pharmacist who had worked at the Guyer Anti-Aging Clinic in Indianapolis during the fall of 2011. The report involved Liam Collins, a British hurdler, going undercover in an attempt to obtain banned substances from Sly and other medical professionals. The report claimed that Manning's wife, Ashley, had been shipped off-label human growth hormone (HGH) by the Guyer Institute during the fall of 2011 while Manning was out with a severe neck injury, with the intention of hiding that Manning was the one actually receiving the drugs; as well as several other athletes been provided the banned hormone supplement Delta-2. Moreover, Sly spoke with apparent knowledge about doping and tossed out several athletes like Howard, Zimmerman, Manning and fellow football players Mike Neal and Dustin Keller.

Sly said on a hidden camera record:

I did part of my training at the Guyer Institute, which is this anti-aging clinic in Indiana. Him and his wife would come in after hours and get IVs and shit. So one thing that Guyer does is he dispenses drugs out of his office, which physicians can do in the United States. It’s just not very many of them do it. And all the time we would be sending Ashley Manning drugs. Like growth hormone, all the time, everywhere, Florida. And it would never be under Peyton’s name. it would always be under her name. We were sending it everywhere... it’d go to Florida... Almost all drugs you can prescribe off-label. GH is one of the few drugs, it’s really the only drug you cannot prescribe off-label. It has three indications.

[About Guyer]

I know for a fact he does. I would see patients with him part of the day and the other part of the day I would work in his pseudo-pharmacy. I’m surprised his place has not been shut down yet.

MLB player Taylor Teagarden also claimed in an undercover footage included in the documentary:

I used it last year, I was very ... I was scared to be honest with you. I took it for like two weeks and I had a test four weeks after my last administration of it. Nothing happened ... And I was also taking peptides too but they were all urine tests, no blood tests ... Once a year, maybe twice at most.

== Reactions ==
Manning told ESPN's Lisa Salters about the reports, on an interview on the morning of the 27th for ESPN Sunday NFL Countdown:

"Disgusted is how I feel. Sickened by it. I’m not sure I understand how someone can make something up about somebody, admit he’s made it up and yet somehow it gets published in a story. I don’t understand that. Maybe you can explain it to me, somebody else can. It’s completely fabricated, complete trash, garbage. It makes me sick it brings Ashley into it. Her medical history, her medical privacy being violated. That makes me sick. I don’t understand that. It’s not right. I don’t understand it."

Salters pointed other cases have been seen in which athletes deny first and then eventually admit allegations and Manning answered he cannot speak for others and he knows how hard he worked. Nevertheless, Manning also stated he had visited the Guyer Institute 35 times during 2011 and that he had received both medication and treatment from Guyer during this time. Sly recanted his story and requested the report not to be aired via a YouTube video following the release of the report.

Manning took response and hired former George W. Bush press secretary Ari Fleischer to manage the issue. He also threatened to sue Al Jazeera, but later backed down. Later, Fleischer confirmed that Ashley Manning did receive shipments from the Guyer Institute, but refused to confirm if the shipments had included HGH.

Media reactions were varied. Fox News' contributor Jesse Watters claimed on The O'Reilly Factor the PED allegations reported by Al Jazeera were a plot to go "after American icons and US institutions," citing the allegations against Manning as the prime example. NBC News on Today gave Al Jazeera's reporter Deborah Davies space to specify details about the reports and provide Al Jazeera's version of the story. CNN's Reliable Sources with Brian Stelter reported Al Jazeera was in contact with a second source who confirmed that the clinic sent HGH to Ashley Manning in Florida and elsewhere, and according to Davies was "absolutely impeccably placed, knowledgeable and credible". After Salters' interview with Manning, former NFL coach and ESPN pundit Mike Ditka expressed on the same Sunday NFL Countdown episode: "Al Jazeera is not a credible news organization. They’re out there spreading garbage." Sports Illustrated sportswriter and NBC Sunday Night Football contributor Peter King called Al Jazeera on his column The MMQB a day later "a quite credible and respected international news organization" and "the CNN of the Middle East spreading its news-gathering around the world in recent years", and also contacted Davies to ask about information related to the Guyer Clinic and Sly. CBS sportscaster and NFL on CBS #1 Play-by-play commentator Jim Nantz refused to acknowledge the report while on the air, referring to it as a "non-story".

As part of the backlash, on January 5, 2016, it was announced that Howard and Zimmerman had filed a lawsuit suing Al Jazeera for defamation following the publication's release of the documentary which linked them. Zimmerman's team, the Washington Nationals, issued a statement in support of their player. In January 2021 attorneys for Al Jazeera Media presented sealed evidence in court, which they said supported their original report. In 2023, both lawsuits were dropped and dismissed with prejudice, with each of the parties bearing their own costs for the lawsuits.

== Further investigations ==
Sly said he had never seen the Mannings and told ESPN's Chris Mortensen that he is not a pharmacist and was not at the Guyer Institute in 2011, as Al Jazeera claimed, but state licensing records indicate that someone named "Charles David Sly" was licensed as a pharmacy intern in Indiana from April 2010 to May 2013 and that his license expired May 1, 2013. Al Jazeera later confirmed that Sly had worked at the Guyer Institute during the Fall of 2011. Sly also claimed to ESPN that the reporter involved, Collins, had taken advantage of him during a vulnerable time in his life as Sly's fiancée had allegedly died, although Sly refers to his fiancée, "Karen", several times in the present tense during his conversations with Collins and gave no indication to Collins that she had died. Sly had also described one of the athletes mentioned, Mike Neal, as a good friend and told in the documentary he had spent about six weeks in Green Bay, Wisconsin, where Neal played; and while on Green Bay, Sly was introduced by Neal to several of his teammates, in a roster which has included players like Matthews III and Julius Peppers, both whom Sly mentioned on camera. Neal served a four-game suspension for doping in 2012. Furthermore, the owner of the Guyer Clinic, Dale Guyer, was linked to doubtful businesses in the past.

Subsequently, The New York Times made the link between most of the names mentioned in the documentary and a sports therapy clinic called Performance Compound in Tampa, Florida run by Sly's partner Jason Riley, a fitness trainer based in Sarasota, Florida. Sly and Riley also launched Elementz Nutrition, a nutritional supplement company whose website and Facebook page feature many of the athletes Sly referred. At the beginning of 2016 Elementz Nutrition voluntarily dissolved and closed its doors.

On February 5, 2016, two men visited Sly's parents, and according to a 911 call from Sly's parents' house during the visit, one of the men initially said he was a law enforcement officer, but didn't have a badge. The two men later acknowledged that they weren't law enforcement officers and stated they were looking for Sly and not his parents. In response to the 911 call, the police went to the Sly house, but meanwhile, after the investigators identified themselves as private investigators, the parents decided to talk with them, and the police left. Sly's parents informed the investigators that their son was due to come home for the holidays the next day. The investigators spoke with Sly on December 23, 2015, though they refused to identify specifically who they were representing.

The NFL, the MLB, and later the USADA initiated investigations into the allegations made by Sly. On April 1, 2016, Teagarden was suspended 80 games for violating the MLB's Joint Drug Prevention and Treatment Program.

In June 2016, Adolpho Birch, NFL senior vice president of labor policy and league affairs informed in a letter to the NFLPA that the league will interview the football players linked to performance-enhancing drug use by the report on the first day of 2016 training camp. League spokesman Brian McCarthy stated via email all players will be interviewed, including Manning, despite the letter to the players union didn't mention him as already retired Manning doesn't belong to the NFLPA anymore.

HGH was outlawed by the NFL in 1991. As part of the collective bargaining agreement in 2011, an HGH testing regime was agreed to, but testing itself for HGH didn't begin until 2014. It is illegal under United States federal law to prescribe HGH off label.
