= Ed McDonough =

American baseball player (1886–1926)

- Catcher
- Born: October 11, 1886; Elgin, Illinois
- Died: September 2, 1926 (aged 39); Elgin, Illinois
- Batted: Right Threw: Right

MLB debut
- August 3, 1909, for the Philadelphia Phillies

Last MLB appearance
- October 11, 1910, for the Philadelphia Phillies

MLB statistics
- Games played: 6
- At bats: 10
- Hits: 1

Teams
- Philadelphia Phillies (1909–1910)

Edward Sebastian McDonough (September 11, 1886 – September 2, 1926) was a catcher in Major League Baseball. He attended Notre Dame, and played his first major league game on August 3, 1909 with the Philadelphia Phillies.

== Biography ==
McDonough was born in Elgin, Illinois. He started his baseball career joining the Jersey City Skeeters of the Eastern League in 1909 at the age of 23. McDonough then transferred up to their MLB affiliate Phillies the same year, making his debut on August 3, 1909, in a Phillies 5–1 loss to the Cardinals. It was the only game McDonough played that season, as he had one unsuccessful at-bat while playing catcher.

The next year McDonough played with the Scranton Miners of the New York State League. He went back to the Philadelphia and played just 5 games for the Phillies. He had a .111 batting average in 9 at-bats that year a hit and a run. His final game came on October 11, 1910, also the final game of the season for the Phillies, when they played the New York Giants in a 6–1 win. McDonough went back to the Miners for the remainder of the 1911 season.

The following year in 1912, McDonough signed with the Chicago Green Sox of the "outlaw" United States Baseball League. It was a league that folded after just over a month of play.

In the same year, McDonough went to the Memphis Chickasaws of the Southern Association. In 11 games there, he batted .212 with 7 hits. He then went to the Chattanooga Lookouts and finished the season there.

McDonough was done with the Southern Association, and in 1913 he went back the New York State League where he had previously been with the Scranton Miners. With the Albany Senators he played 109 games, batting .268 with 93 hits. The following year he went to the Utica Utes, batting .273 in 99 games in 1914. His final year playing baseball would be with Utica the next year, where McDonough had a .235 average in 90 games.

== Death ==
McDonough died on September 2, 1926, in his hometown of Elgin. He was 39 years of age, and it was only 11 years after he had finished his career with the Utica Utes.
