= Jim Stanley (baseball) =

American baseball player (1887-1947)

- Shortstop
- Born: December 1, 1887; Plymouth, Pennsylvania, U.S.
- Died: February 11, 1947 (aged 59); Michigan City, Indiana, U.S.
- Batted: Both Threw: right

MLB debut
- April 19, 1914, for the Chicago Federals

Last MLB appearance
- September 29, 1914, for the Chicago Federals

MLB statistics
- Batting average: .194
- Home runs: 0
- RBI: 4
- Stats at Baseball Reference

Teams
- Chicago Federals (1914)

James F. Stanley (December 1, 1887 – February 11, 1947) was an American shortstop for the Chicago Federals professional baseball team in 1914. He was born Stanislaus Francis Ciolek, was raised in Chicago, and worked in the steel mills.

A ballplayer in the Chicago semi-pro leagues, often for the Inland Steel Mill team, James Stanley (the name he played under) briefly played for the Danville Speakers of the Three-I League in 1910, hired by Danville's manager Jack McCarthy, an old Chicago baseball player. Stanley was released in May, having played fewer than 10 games. In 1911 he played 3rd base for the Seward Statesmen of the Nebraska State League, batting .244 in 60 games. In 1912 he returned to Chicago, playing 3rd, right field and shortstop for the Chicago Green Sox of the United States Baseball League, batting .252 in 33 games. In 1913 he played the infield for the Chicago Keeleys of the minor league Federal League, batting .256 through the end of August. An injury (a broken bone in his ankle) curtailed his season. In 1914 the Chicago Federals of the major league Federal League signed him to be a utility infielder. The 5-6, 148 pound Stanley, nicknamed "Honus" after Hall of Famer Honus Wagner, batted .194 in limited duty. After his major league stint, he played for the Youngstown Steelmen in 1915. In 1916 his old manager, Joe Tinker, signed him to play 3rd base for the Peoria Distillers, though it appears he never played for them. That year he moved to Michigan City, Indiana to work as a crane operator there, and played for his company team. In 1918 he was back in South Chicago (a neighborhood near the old Chicago steel mills) playing semi-pro ball. By 1925 was working for the Michigan City fire department. He is buried in Holy Cross Cemetery, Calumet City, Illinois.
