= Socks Seybold =

American baseball player (1870–1921)

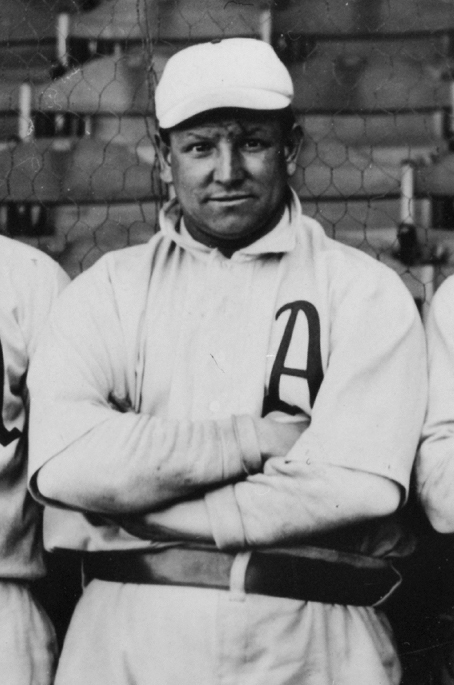
- Outfielder
- Born: November 23, 1870; Washingtonville, Ohio, U.S.
- Died: December 22, 1921 (aged 51); Greensburg, Pennsylvania, U.S.
- Batted: Right Threw: Right

MLB debut
- August 20, 1899, for the Cincinnati Reds

Last MLB appearance
- October 7, 1908, for the Philadelphia Athletics

MLB statistics
- Batting average: .294
- Home runs: 51
- Runs batted in: 556
- Stats at Baseball Reference

Teams
- Cincinnati Reds (1899); Philadelphia Athletics (1901–1908)

Career highlights and awards
- AL home run leader (1902)

Ralph Orlando "Socks" Seybold (November 23, 1870 – December 21, 1921) was an American professional baseball outfielder. He played in Major League Baseball over parts of nine seasons with the Cincinnati Reds and Philadelphia Athletics. Known as a power hitter, Seybold set the American League record for home runs in 1902, which would not be broken until 1919. He stood at 5 ft 11 in (1.80 m) and weighed 200 lbs.

== Biography ==
Seybold was born in Washingtonville, Ohio. He started his professional baseball career in 1892, and over the next few years he played in the Pennsylvania State League and Atlantic League. In 1896, he had a breakout season, hitting .352 at Lancaster, and in 1897, he led the team to the pennant by slugging a league-leading 14 home runs. Seybold led the Atlantic League in homers again in 1898 and was leading in 1899 when he was purchased by the Cincinnati Reds.

Seybold made his major league debut on August 20. He did not hit well in Cincinnati, and returned to the minors in 1900. He led the American League in home runs, with 9. Seybold then got his second shot in the majors in 1901, with the Philadelphia Athletics, and this time, he stuck. That season, he hit .334 and had a 27-game hitting streak in July and August.

In 1902, Seybold batted .316 and set career-highs in home runs, with 16, and runs batted in, with 97. The home run total led the league and stood as the AL record until Babe Ruth broke it in 1919. The Athletics also won the pennant. In 1903, Seybold's batting average dipped below .300; however, his OPS+ stayed at exactly 138, and he ripped a league-leading 45 doubles. Seybold continued his solid hitting from 1904 to 1907. In 1905, he played in his only World Series, which the Athletics lost to the New York Giants; Seybold went 2 for 16 at the plate.

In 1908, Seybold tore some ligaments in his leg sliding into home in a pre-season game at New Orleans. He left the team in June 1908 saying, "I feel that I cannot do myself justice. I have decided to quit for the season." He later returned to the team, but struggled the rest of the year, batting just .215. He played his last major league game on October 7, 1908. In December 1908, Philadelphia manager Connie Mack announced that he was releasing Seybold.

In 997 games over nine seasons, Seybold posted a .294 batting average (1085-for-3685) with 478 runs, 218 doubles, 54 triples, 51 home runs, 556 RBI, 66 stolen bases, 293 bases on balls, .353 on-base percentage and .424 slugging percentage. He finished his career with a .964 fielding percentage.

Seybold then played and coached in several minor league and industrial teams for a few years. In January 1909, he signed a contract to play for the Toledo Mud Hens, but injuries continued to slow Seybold during the 1909 season. From 1910 to 1911, he coached industrial teams in Jeanette. On April 4, 1912, he signed with the Richmond Rebels of the United States Baseball League. His baseball career ended with the demise of the league in June.

At the end of July 1919, Babe Ruth equaled Seybold's American League record of 16 home runs in a season; Ruth went on to hit 29 homers in 1919.

Seybold was married but had no children. His wife, Wilhelmina "Minnie" Heitz, died in 1917. In his later years, Seybold was employed as a steward of a social club (Fraternal Order of Eagles) in Jeannette, Pennsylvania. In 1921, Seybold was driving a car when it overturned at a sharp curve on the Lincoln Highway east of Jeanette; he was killed instantly. He left an estate valued at $20,000. Seybold was buried next to his wife at Brush Creek Cemetery in Irwin.

== See also ==
- List of Major League Baseball annual home run leaders
- List of Major League Baseball annual doubles leaders
