= Ryan Zimmerman =

American baseball player (born 1984)

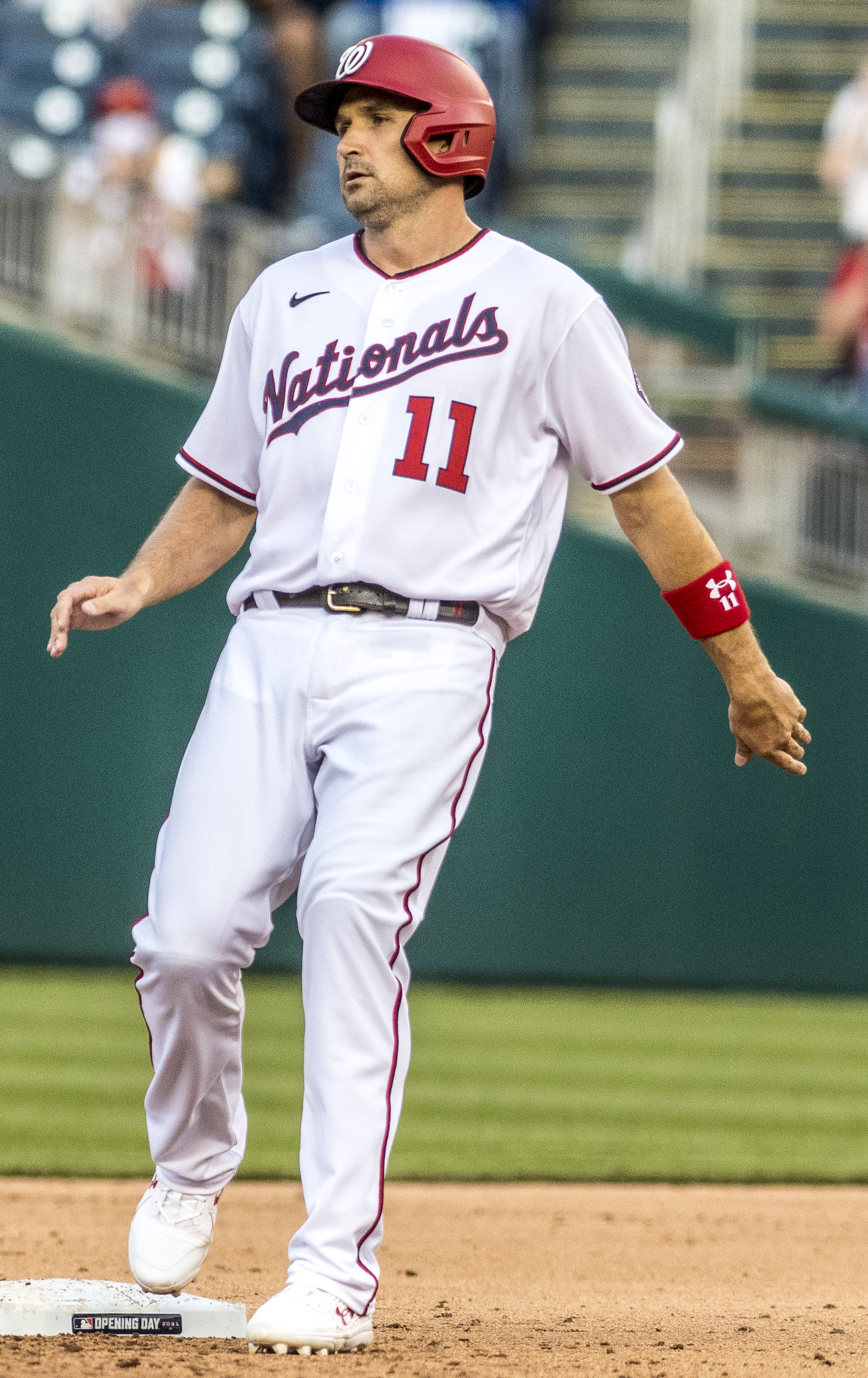
- Zimmerman with the Washington Nationals in 2021
- Third baseman / First baseman
- Born: September 28, 1984 (age 42); Washington, North Carolina, U.S.
- Batted: Right Threw: Right

MLB debut
- September 1, 2005, for the Washington Nationals

Last MLB appearance
- October 3, 2021, for the Washington Nationals

MLB statistics
- Batting average: .277
- Home runs: 284
- Runs batted in: 1,061
- Stats at Baseball Reference

Teams
- Washington Nationals (2005–2019, 2021)

Career highlights and awards
- 2× All-Star (2009, 2017); World Series champion (2019); Gold Glove Award (2009); 2× Silver Slugger Award (2009, 2010); Washington Nationals No. 11 retired; Washington Nationals Ring of Honor
Medals
Men's baseball
Representing United States
World University Championship
Gold medal – first place	2004 Tainan	Team

Ryan Wallace Zimmerman (born September 28, 1984) is an American former professional baseball infielder who spent his entire 17-year Major League Baseball (MLB) career with the Washington Nationals. Zimmerman was primarily a third baseman before moving to first base in 2015. He was twice selected as an MLB All-Star, won one Gold Glove and two Silver Slugger awards, and was member of the Nationals team that won the 2019 World Series.

Zimmerman graduated from Kellam High School in Virginia Beach, Virginia, and played college baseball at the University of Virginia. He was selected in the first round as the fourth overall pick by the Nationals in the 2005 MLB draft and made his debut during the franchise’s inaugural season in Washington, D.C., remaining with the team through 2021.

Nicknamed Mr. National, Zimmerman was the franchise’s first-ever draft pick following its relocation to Washington and became the face of the team during its early years, serving as a central figure throughout its development into a contender. He set numerous franchise records and was known for his clutch hitting and walk-off hits, finishing his career with 11 walk-off home runs, one of the highest totals in Major League Baseball history.

== Amateur career ==
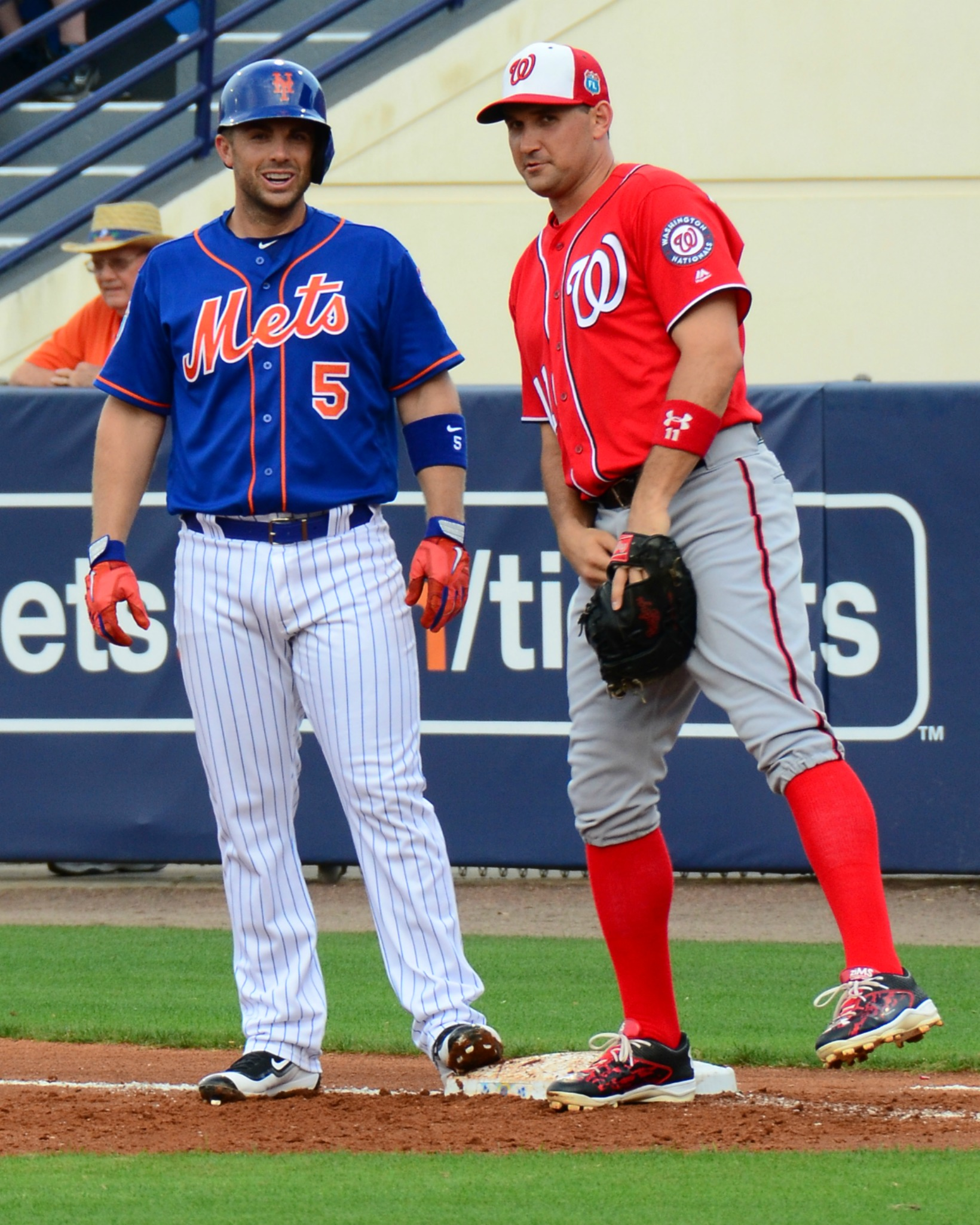
Zimmerman (right) and David Wright were AAU teammates before playing for division rivals for more than a decade.

Before college, Zimmerman played on an AAU team with B.J. Upton and David Wright. As a high schooler in 2000, he played on a "showcase team" with Wright, Mark Reynolds, and B.J. and Justin Upton.

Zimmerman played high school baseball as a shortstop at Floyd E. Kellam High School in Virginia Beach. Until late in his senior year, James Madison, Charlotte, and UNC Wilmington were the only Division I programs to show interest in him. He later received a scholarship offer from Virginia.

The Virginia native spent his 2003 summer with the Peninsula Pilots. He batted a team-best .331 with 47 hits, including eight doubles, a triple and a homer. He finished with 19 RBIs, 12 runs scored, 60 total bases, and 16 walks. Zimmerman's hits, total bases, and slugging percentage (.423) were Pilots team-highs that season. He was later named to the North CPL All-Star team, where he went 1-for-2. In 2006, the Coastal Plain League honored Zimmerman as a member of its All-Decade Team.

A three-year starting third baseman for the Virginia Cavaliers in the Atlantic Coast Conference, Zimmerman started in all 174 games he appeared in. His collegiate career statistics include 250 hits, 140 RBIs, 128 runs, 47 doubles, seven triples, and nine home runs. He was successful on 32 of 39 stolen base attempts. His career totals are among the top 10 in Virginia statistical categories for doubles (5th), hits (6th), and RBI (7th). Zimmerman established the school record of hits in a season with 90 in 2004, then broke his record with 92 in 2005.

In his final collegiate season, Zimmerman led the Cavaliers with a .393 average, .581 slugging percentage, 136 total bases, 92 hits, 59 RBIs, and 51 runs. He struck out just 14 times in the full season. Through August 2011, he was one of 29 former UVA players to have made it to the major leagues, along with Michael Schwimer, Javier López, and Mark Reynolds.

Zimmerman's collegiate awards and honors include 2005 All-American by Baseball America, 2005 All-American by National Collegiate Baseball Writers Association, 2005 All-ACC selection, 2005 ACC All-Tournament, Team and 2005 Virginia College Sports Information Directors (VaSID) Player of the Year. He was also a 2004 First Team All-ACC selection, 2004 VaSID All-State Team selection, and named to the 2004 Charlottesville NCAA Regional All-Tournament Team.

== International baseball ==
Zimmerman started at third base for the 2004 USA Baseball National Team that won the gold medal in the FISU II World University Baseball Championship. Zimmerman's summer with Team USA included starting 18 of 24 games and leading the team in batting average (.468), hits (36), RBI (27), runs (25), doubles (12), home runs (4), slugging percentage (.805) and total bases (62). He also posted a .933 fielding percentage.

Zimmerman's .468 batting average set a national team single-season record and helped him earn the World University Championship tournament MVP.

He won the USA Baseball Richard W. "Dick" Case Player of the Year Award in 2004.

== Professional career ==
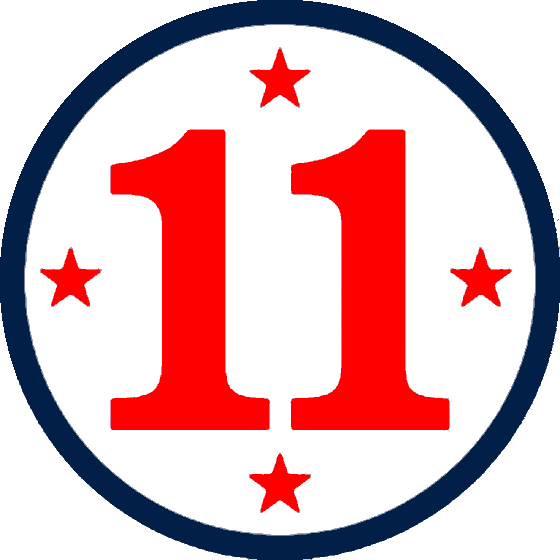
Ryan Zimmerman's number 11 was retired by the Washington Nationals in 2022.

=== 2005 season ===
Zimmerman was drafted in the first round as the fourth overall pick by the Washington Nationals in the 2005 Major League Baseball draft. After being signed on the day he was drafted, he was sent to the Savannah Sand Gnats, the Nationals' minor league A-level affiliate and then quickly moved up to the Harrisburg Senators, the AA affiliate.

Zimmerman was called up to the majors when rosters expanded in September 2005. He first played shortstop for two games, taking over for an injured Cristian Guzman. Zimmerman also shared third base duties with Vinny Castilla, taking over the position on a more permanent basis between the time the Nationals were mathematically eliminated from playoff contention and the end of the season. In his first major league at bat at RFK Stadium he muscled a double to left center. Over the course of 20 games, he posted a .397 batting average, 10 doubles, and 6 RBIs in 58 at-bats. He was the only member of the 2005 team to hit over .300 in at least 50 at-bats.

=== 2006 season ===
He remained with the Major League club to start the 2006 campaign, taking over third base duties from Castilla, who was traded to the San Diego Padres. Prior to 2006 Spring Training, Zimmerman changed his jersey number from #25 (2005) to #11, his former college number.

On April 5, 2006, he hit his first Major League home run off a 93-mph fastball in the ninth inning against Mets' closer Billy Wagner. It sailed into the second deck in Shea Stadium, tied the game in the top of the ninth inning, and allowed the Nationals to go on to win their first game of the 2006 season by a score of 9–5 in extra innings.

On June 18, 2006, Father's Day, with his father in the stands, Zimmerman hit his tenth Major League home run and his first walk-off home run when he hit a 2-run shot in the bottom of the ninth inning to beat the New York Yankees 3–2. The usually stoic Zimmerman gleefully tossed his batting helmet in the air while rounding third and leaped onto home plate as his teammates crowded around him. He later took a curtain call and tossed his batting gloves into the stands.

On July 4, 2006, he hit a 3-run home run against Florida closer Joe Borowski on a two-strike pitch with two outs in the 9th inning of a game Washington was losing 4–3; the walk-off home run carried Washington to a 6–4 victory. This was Zimmerman's 12th career home run and his second walk-off. Two days later he delivered a walk-off single against the Marlins to win the game 8–7 in the 11th inning.

On September 27, 2006, against the Philadelphia Phillies, Zimmerman hit his 20th home run of the season and tied the Expos/Nationals franchise record for home runs by a rookie, set by Brad Wilkerson for the then-Expos in 2002

During his first season as the Nationals' third baseman, Zimmerman became a hometown hero and a fan favorite through his defense and ability to come through in late-inning situations. Frank Robinson once compared Zimmerman's defense to that of Brooks Robinson, a former teammate of Frank Robinson's. During the 2006 spring training, Frank Robinson said that he thought 12 homers and 60 RBIs would be a realistic goal for his rookie infielder; Zimmerman exceeded those expectations and finished with 20 home runs and 110 RBIs. Along with those two figures, he finished the 2006 season with 156 games played, 612 at-bats, .288 batting average, .352 OBP, 84 runs scored, 176 hits, 47 doubles, 3 triples, and 11 steals. He led all Major Leaguers with 10 or more bunts in bunt hit percentage, at 83.3% with 10 bunt hits. Although he was named on more ballots (29–27), Zimmerman finished second in the 2006 NL Rookie of the Year voting to Florida Marlins shortstop Hanley Ramírez in the closest Rookie of the Year vote ever.

=== 2007 season ===
On a game that began on May 12, 2007, but ended at 1:42 am the next day (Mother's Day), Zimmerman hit a two-out bottom-of-the-ninth grand slam to rally the Nationals past the Florida Marlins, 7–3.

On June 22, 2007, Zimmerman fielded a routine ground ball that ended up in his jersey. As he bent over to underhand the ball at his stomach level, his jersey top opened and hung down in front of his glove, causing the ball to go into his jersey instead of his positioned glove.

On July 4, 2007, Zimmerman hit a two-out go-ahead home run in the first inning against the Chicago Cubs. The one-run home run would have been considered routine had it not continued a trend that led to Zimmerman being declared a "human fireworks" show by an ESPN.com article. The Independence Day home run marked Zimmerman's fifth game-ending or go-ahead home run on a holiday. Zimmerman hit home runs on Father's Day in 2006 and 2007, Independence Day in 2006 and 2007, and Mother's Day in 2007. Per ESPN.com, Zimmerman was quoted as saying, "I wish every day was a holiday."

On August 3, 2007, Zimmerman delivered his sixth walk-off game-winner in his first two seasons with a single to left, giving the Nationals a 3–2 win over the visiting St. Louis Cardinals. With another walk-off in September, Zimmerman produced seven walk-offs with three via home run, three via singles, and one via bases-loaded walk, in less than two seasons. Manager Manny Acta stated, "He has done some dramatic stuff since he's been up here...he doesn't get rattled when that situation comes up, and I think that's what he has shown here the last two years." Subsequent to the game, Zimmerman was presented the 2006 Larry Doby Legacy Award for his achievements during his rookie season.

On August 4, 2007, Zimmerman had his first career multi-homer day, hitting a solo shot in the fourth and a two-run homer in the sixth in a 12–1 victory over the St. Louis Cardinals.

in 2007, Zimmerman was one of 7 players to play in all 162 games of the season. He slashed .266/.330/.458 and set a career high in home runs with 24.

In November 2007 during the offseason Zimmerman participated in a homerun derby fundraiser for Grassfield High School in Chesapeake, Virginia. Participants included Michael Cuddyer who won the derby, Justin Upton, B.J. Upton, David Wright, and Mark Reynolds; all of whom are from the Hampton Roads area. Zimmerman broke his wrist and could not complete the derby and required surgery prior to the 2008 season.

=== 2008 season ===
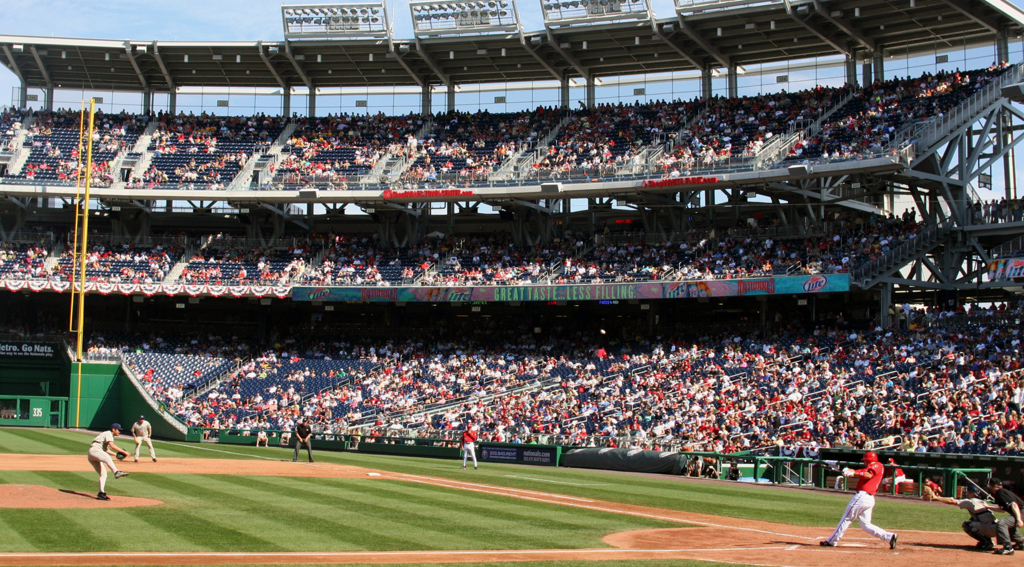
Zimmerman in 2008.

On March 30, the Washington Nationals played the Atlanta Braves in the first regular season major league baseball game in the new Nationals Park. In that game, with two outs in the bottom of the ninth, Zimmerman hit a walk-off home run off of the Braves' Peter Moylan, giving the Nationals a 3–2 win. It was the first home run hit by a Nationals player in the history of their new ballpark. Zimmerman was placed on the disabled list on June 3, 2008, with a small labral tear in his left shoulder. He rejoined the team July 22, 2008, after a short minor league assignment. On February 20, 2009, Zimmerman agreed to a $3.325 million, one-year deal for 2009, avoiding arbitration.

=== 2009 season ===
On April 20, 2009, Zimmerman signed a five-year, $45 million contract with the Nationals through the 2013 season, replacing the one year, $3.325 million contract he had agreed to in February in order to avoid arbitration. He hit safely in 30 consecutive games, the longest such streak by any player since 2006. That streak was broken May 13 against the Giants, going 0-for-3 with two walks in five plate appearances; he hit into a fielder's choice in his last at-bat. His streak of reaching base (via hit or walk) in 43 consecutive games ended on May 26. On July 5, 2009, he was selected to his first All-Star Game. On September 6, 2009, he hit a walk-off two-run homer against the Florida Marlins to give the Nationals a 5–4 win. On November 11, 2009, he won a Gold Glove Award as the best defensive third baseman in the National League, and on November 12, 2009, he won a Silver Slugger Award as the best offensive third baseman in the league. Zimmerman also won a Fielding Bible Award as Major League Baseball's best fielding third baseman. He also won the ESPN Web Gems Award, which is given to the player with the most Top 10 plays on the "Baseball Tonight" show, the first player given that award.

=== 2010 season ===
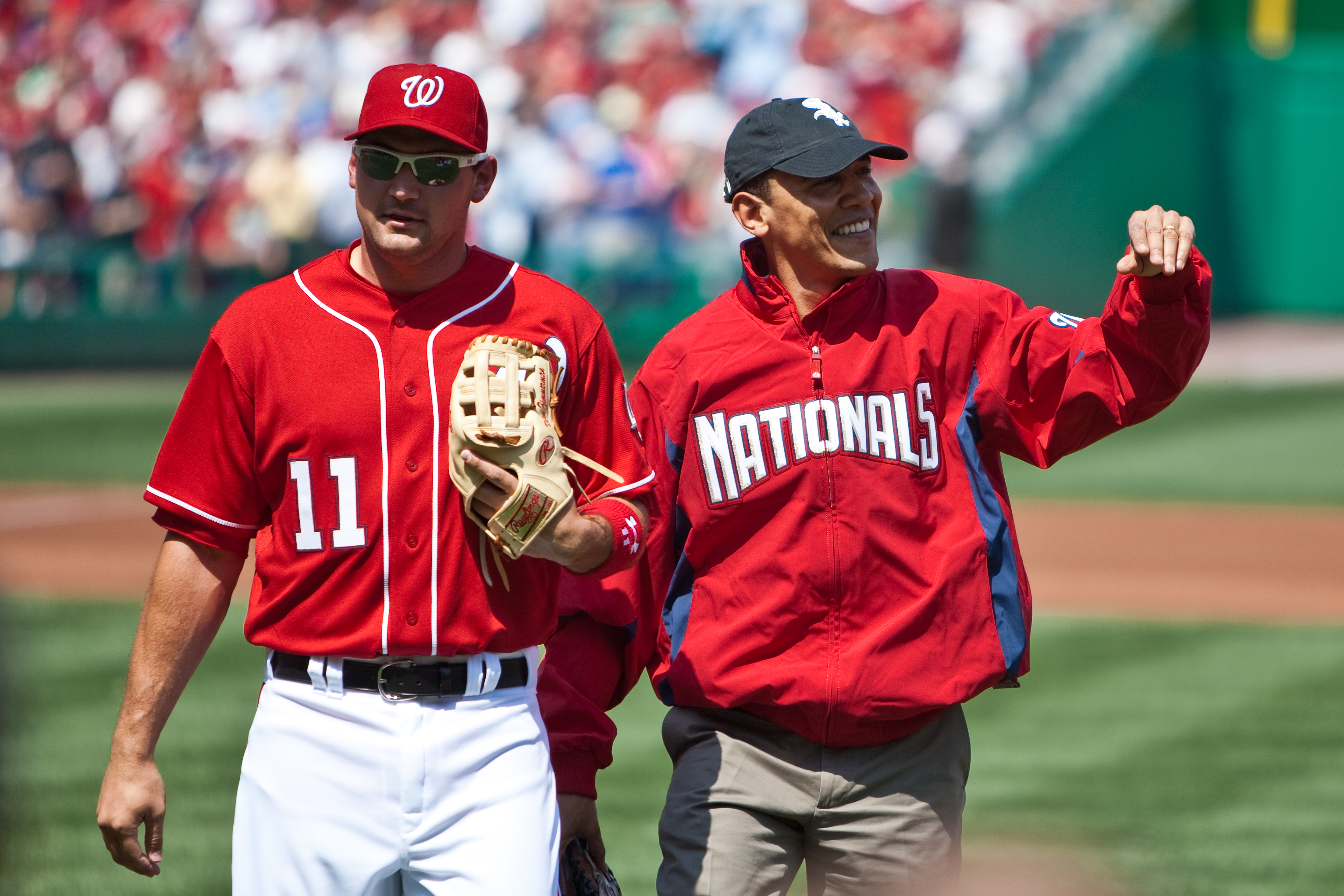
Zimmerman (left) and Barack Obama.

Zimmerman hit his 100th career home run on May 30, 2010, at Petco Park, becoming the second player to reach this milestone from the 2005 draft class. He homered a second time in the same game, the 7th multi-homer game of his career. For the season, Zimmerman hit 25 home runs, 85 RBIs, and had his first .300 batting average with .307. On November 11, 2010, Zimmerman won his second Silver Slugger Award at third base.

=== 2011 season ===
Zimmerman started off the season hot, batting .357 through April 9. On that day Zimmerman was injured, and on April 11 was placed on the 15-Day DL with an abdominal strain. It wasn't until June 14 that the Nationals star 3rd baseman came back to play against the Cardinals. As of July 9, Zimmerman was hitting .252, with 4 homers and 15 RBIs, with 15 runs scored and 1 stolen base. On August 19, 2011, Zimmerman hit a walk-off grand slam to give the Nationals an 8–4 victory over the Philadelphia Phillies. Zimmerman won the 2011 Lou Gehrig Memorial Award.

=== 2012 season ===
On February 26, 2012, Zimmerman signed a 6-year, $100 million extension that ran through 2019 and included a $24 million club option for 2020. His extension also included a full no-trade clause, effective 2014. Zimmerman had previously set a deadline of the day before to sign an extension. With this contract, Zimmerman was set to earn $12 million in 2012; $84 million from 2013 to 2018 at $14 million annually; $18 million in 2019; and in 2020, either $18 million if the Nationals picked up his option or $2 million if they bought him out. After retirement, he would earn $10 million more over the course of five years while working for the club. If the Nationals were to trade him before his no-trade clause took effect, he would earn an additional $8 million. Zimmerman could make as little as $126 million or as much as $150 million over the full life of the contract.

On April 27, the Nationals placed Zimmerman on the 15-day Disabled List with shoulder inflammation, retroactive to April 21. He returned May 6.

Zimmerman struggled early in the 2012 season due to shoulder pain, hitting only .218 with 3 home runs in his first 55 games. He received a cortisone injection on June 24 to mitigate the pain, with apparent results: in his next 25 games, he hit .392 with 11 home runs and 28 RBI. He brought his OPS up from .590 to .801. For his much-improved performance by mid-July, Zimmerman was awarded the NL Player of the Week.

Zimmerman would make his first appearance in the postseason in 2012 as a result of the Nationals winning the National League East and he hit .381/.364/.714 with home runs in Games 2 and 5 of the 2012 National League Division Series against the St. Louis Cardinals. However, the Cardinals went on to eliminate the Nationals in 5 games.

=== 2013 season ===
Zimmerman underwent arthroscopic surgery on his right shoulder in the off-season to repair the scar tissue that had bothered him in 2012. He spent much of the winter rehabilitating it to get ready for the season, although his doctors estimate he may not regain full strength in it until June. On May 29 Zimmerman had the first three home run game as the Nationals lost to the Orioles 9–6. On July 26, 2013, Zimmerman hit his ninth career walk-off home run against the Mets. He completed the season batting .275 with 26 home runs, 79 runs batted in, and 6 stolen bases over a total of 147 games played.

=== 2014 season ===
After returning from an injury and with Anthony Rendon playing well at third base, Zimmerman played left field for the Nationals. On June 24, three weeks after returning, Zimmerman hit a 2-run home run in the 16th inning against the Milwaukee Brewers. Zimmerman, playing left field, caught the final out to what as at the time the longest game by innings in Nationals history.

After the season, the Nationals declined the option of first baseman Adam LaRoche, with the intention of Zimmerman moving to first base in 2015 due to his many shoulder injuries, with Rendon taking over as the starting third baseman.

=== 2015 season ===
On May 19, 2015, Zimmerman hit his 10th career walk-off home run, ranking him third all time in National League walk-off home runs. On September 4, Zimmerman hit two home runs in a game against the St. Louis Cardinals, the second of which was his 200th career home run. Zimmerman was on the disabled list from June 11 to July 28 with plantar fasciitis, which was the first of 3 times in his career that he would be placed on the disabled/injured list due to that injury. Overall, he played in 86 games and hit 16 home runs with 73 RBI and had a .773 OPS

=== 2016 season ===
On May 15, 2016, Zimmerman hit his first career inside-the-park home run. Outfielders Marcell Ozuna and Giancarlo Stanton violently collided into each other going after the ball that was hit to the right-center field warning track, and both fell to the ground on the outfield warning track. Zimmerman had two separate stints on the disabled list in 2016, he missed about three weeks in July due to a left rib cage strain and missed two weeks in August due to a left wrist contusion. For the season, Zimmerman slashed .218/.272/.370 for a .642 OPS, by far his worst numbers across a season in each stat, and hit 15 home runs with 46 RBI in 115 games.

=== 2017 season ===
Zimmerman enjoyed a major offensive return to form during the 2017 season, and he was voted onto the National League All-Star roster as the starting first baseman, his first selection to the All-Star Game since 2009.

On April 29, Zimmerman hit a 470-foot homer, marking the longest ever hit at Nationals Park. On July 17, Zimmerman hit his 235th career home run, setting a new Nationals/Expos franchise record. On July 27, Zimmerman hit the fourth consecutive home run by Nationals hitters off Milwaukee Brewers starter Michael Blazek, the first time the feat had been accomplished in Major League Baseball since the 2011 season.

On August 9, Zimmerman set the Nationals' franchise record for most runs batted in, earning his 906th RBI on a solo home run against the Miami Marlins. He finished the night by going 4 for 4 with two home runs and 5 RBIs. On August 11, he tied his career high for RBIs in a game, with six, during a contest against the Chicago Cubs in which he also hit two home runs, both coming off of Cubs starter Jon Lester.

Zimmerman ended the regular season with a career high 36 homers, with 108 RBI and a .303 batting average over 144 games played. He also set career highs in SLG (.573) and OPS (.930).

In the 8th inning of Game 2 of the 2017 National League Division Series, Zimmerman hit a go-ahead 3-run home run that would end up being the eventual game winner. However, the Nationals lost the series to the defending champion Chicago Cubs in 5 games and were eliminated in the NLDS for the 4th time in a 6 year span. Zimmerman went 3-22 (.150) in the series.

Zimmerman was awarded the 2017 Players Choice Award Comeback Player of the Year Award.

=== 2018 season ===
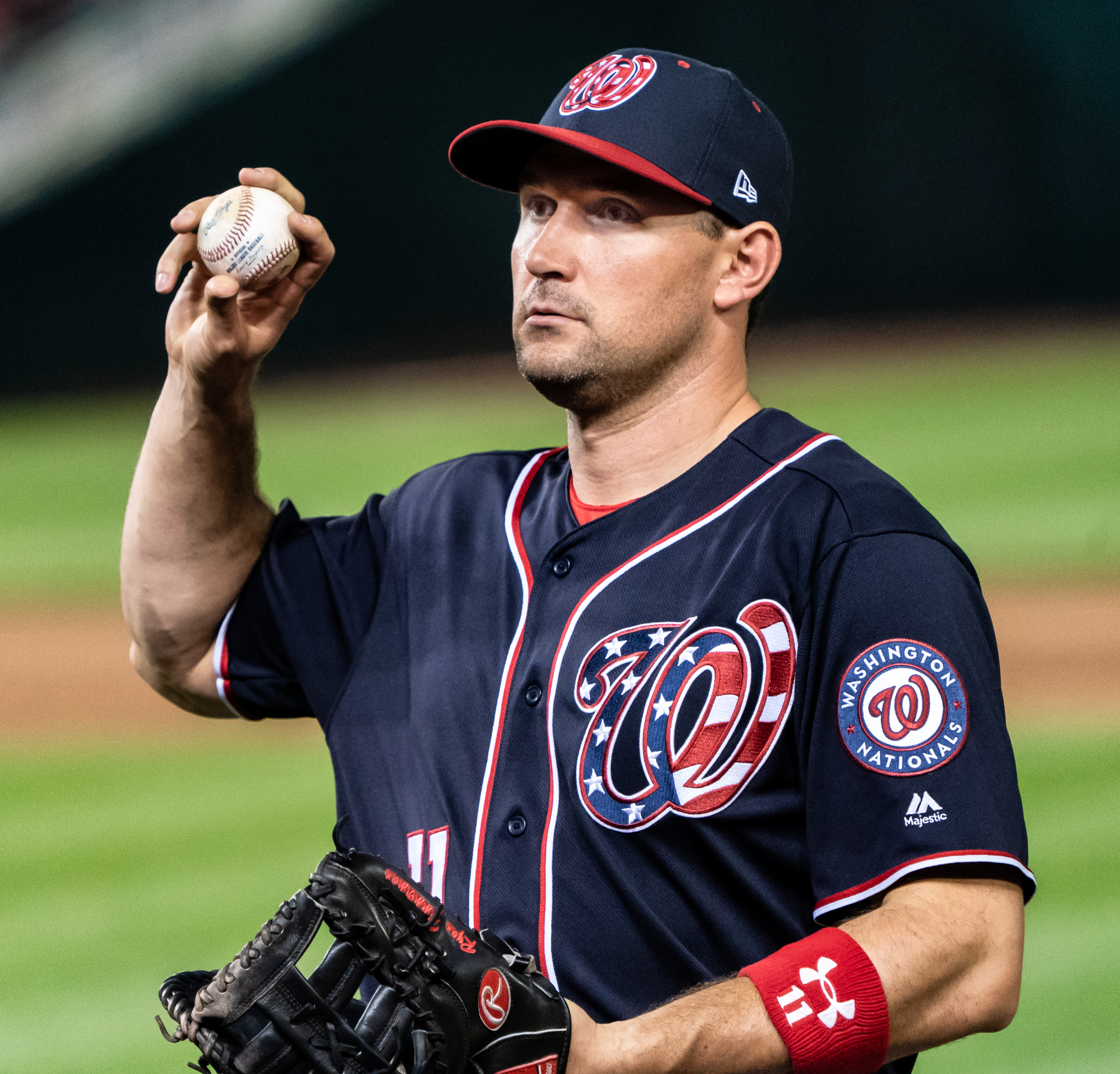
Zimmerman with the Nationals at Nationals Park in 2018

Zimmerman missed nearly half of the 2018 season due to an oblique injury. He batted .264/.337/.486 with 13 home runs in 85 games.

On July 31, Zimmerman recorded his 1,695th career hit, passing Tim Wallach for first place on the Nationals franchise's all-time list for career hits. On August 22, Zimmerman hit his 11th career walk-off home run against the Philadelphia Phillies off Seranthony Dominguez. That home run put him in a three-way tie with Tony Perez and David Ortiz for the 8th most walk-off home runs of all time.

=== 2019 season ===
On July 5, 2019, Zimmerman hit his 1000th career RBI with a 7th inning double off of Kevin McCarthy against the Kansas City Royals. In 2019 Zimmerman batted .257/.321/.415 with six home runs and 27 RBIs in 171 at bats.

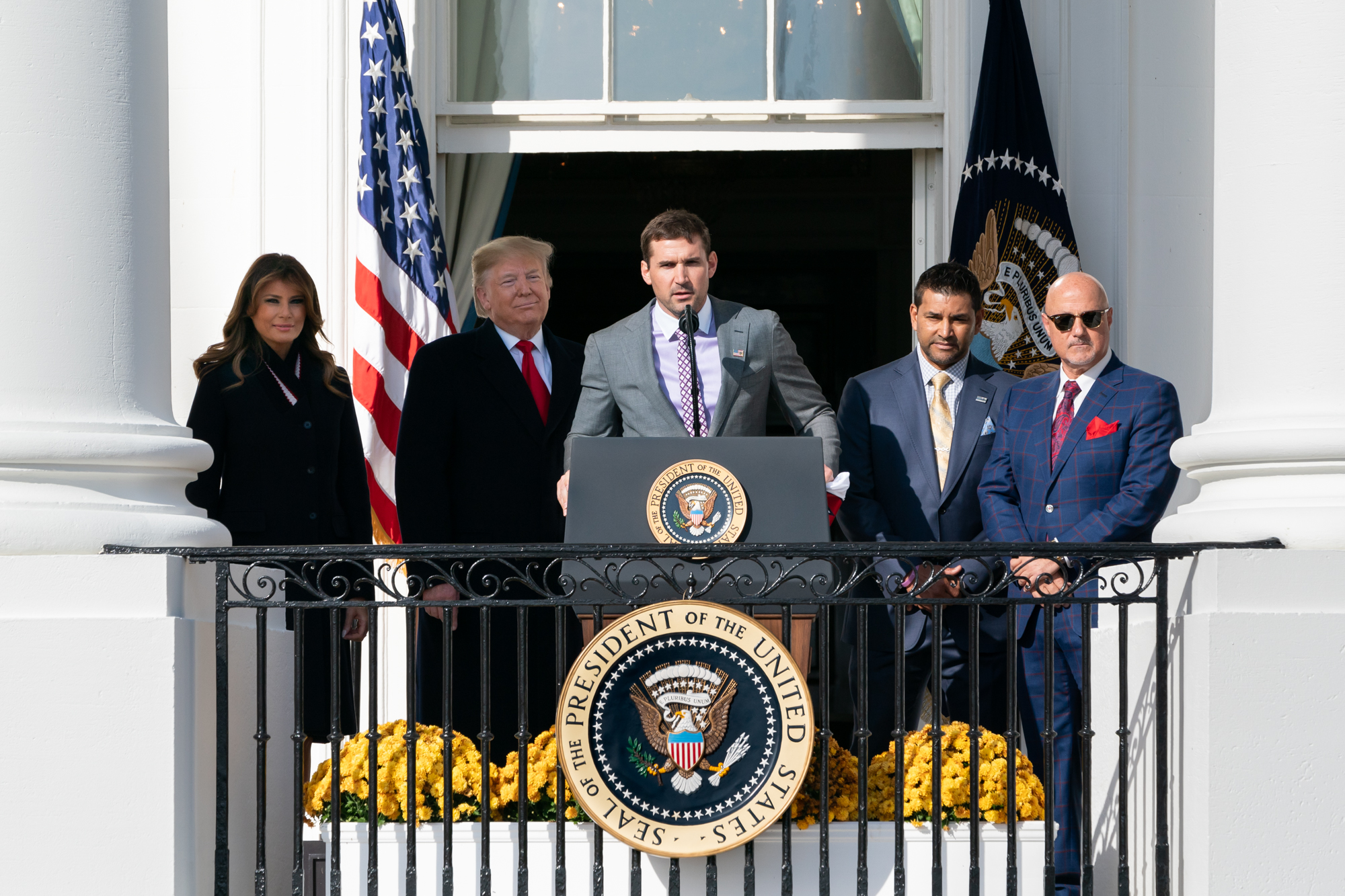
Ryan Zimmerman delivers remarks at the White House during the celebration for the 2019 World Series Champions in Nov 2019.

Zimmerman was on the injured list from April 28 to June 28 and from July 23 to September 1, both times due to plantar fasciitis in his right foot

In 2019, the Nationals made the playoffs as the first National League Wild Card team and in the Wild Card Game on October 1 against the Milwaukee Brewers, Zimmerman hit a crucial pinch hit single in the 8th inning against Josh Hader as part of a rally to help the Nationals win the game and advance to the next round.

In the 2019 National League Division Series against the Los Angeles Dodgers, Zimmerman hit a 3-run home run in Game 4 that extended a 1-run lead and secured the win. The Nationals won the series in 5 games and advanced past the NLDS for the first time in franchise history.

In the 2019 National League Championship Series against the St. Louis Cardinals, Zimmerman went 4-16 (.250) with 2 doubles and 2 RBIs to help the Nationals sweep the Cardinals and advance to the World Series for the first time in franchise history. In the 8th inning of Game 1, Zimmerman made a diving catch that temporarily preserved a no-hitter for Nationals pitcher Anibal Sanchez, although Sanchez did allow a hit later in the inning and lost the no-hit bid.

On October 22, 2019, in his first career World Series at bat, he hit the first World Series home run in Nationals franchise history. The Nationals would go on to win the 2019 World Series in 7 games and Zimmerman to earn his first World Series championship. He went 5–22 (.208) with one home run and two RBI in the Series; in the entire 2019 postseason, Zimmerman went 14–55 (.255) with two homers, three doubles, and 7 RBI.

=== 2020 season ===
The Nationals declined to exercise an $18 million club option for Zimmerman for the 2020 season, making Zimmerman a free agent for the first time in his career. On January 28, 2020, Zimmerman signed a one-year, $2 million contract to return to the Nationals.

On June 29, 2020, Zimmerman decided to opt out of playing in 2020 due to the COVID-19 pandemic. While it was the first Nationals season without Zimmerman playing a regular season game, he had played in six 2020 spring training games in a Nats uniform before the league-wide shutdown due to the pandemic.

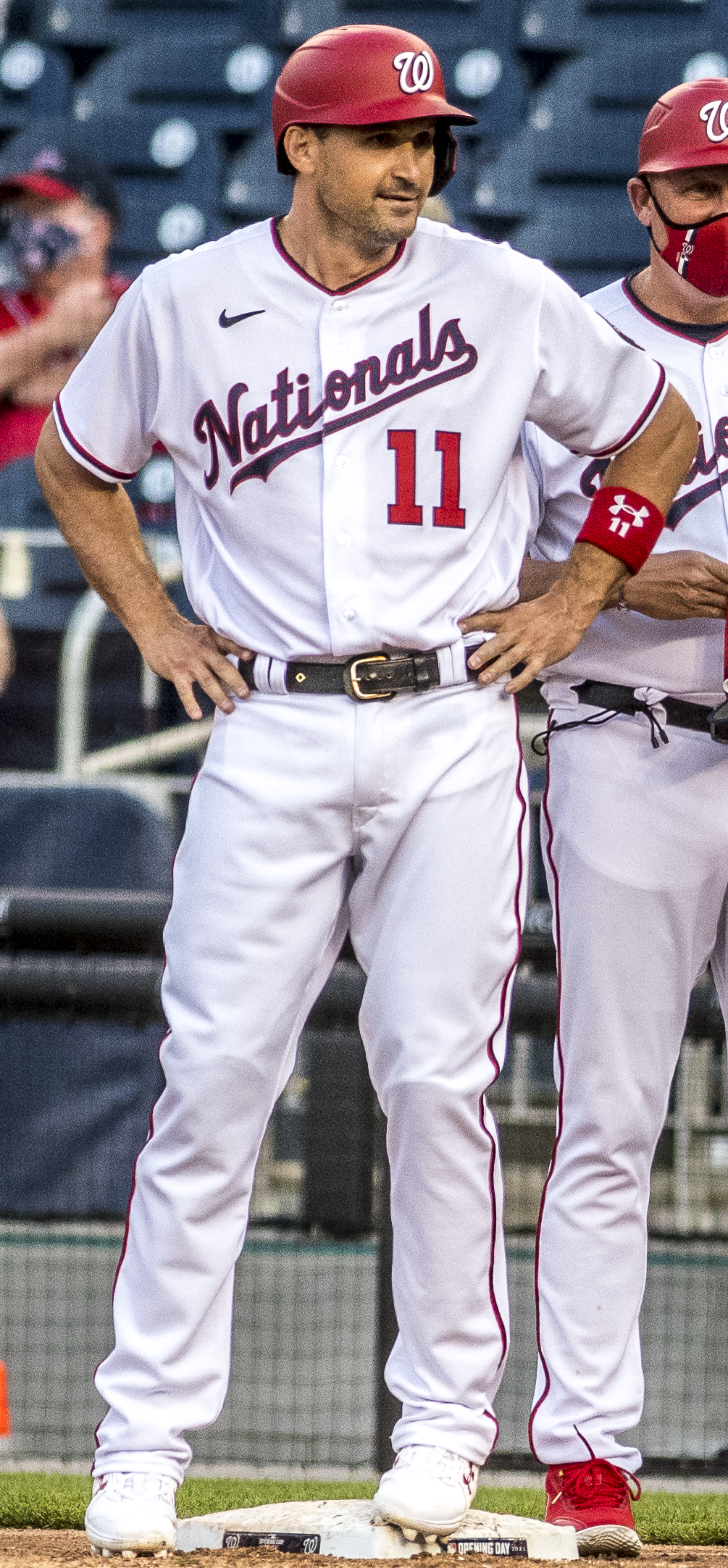
Ryan Zimmerman in a game against the Atlanta Braves during the 2021 season.

=== 2021 season and retirement ===
On January 23, 2021, Zimmerman re-signed with the Nationals on a one-year, $1 million contract. On May 22, Zimmerman passed Hall of Famer Tim Raines for most runs scored in Nationals/Expos franchise history. On August 12, Zimmerman passed Tim Wallach for the most games played in Nats/Expos franchise history.

Questions regarding Zimmerman's possible retirement began to circulate towards the end of the season, with Zimmerman himself "unsure" about his playing future. Zimmerman would ultimately start at first base on October 3, the final game of the season; he was then removed in the 8th inning, receiving a standing ovation from the crowd at Nationals Park.

On February 15, 2022, Zimmerman announced his retirement. He retired as the franchise (both the Nationals and Expos) all-time leader in many statistical categories including hits (1,846), home runs (284), RBI (1,061), and games played (1,799). He also holds many Nationals records (2005-present) such as fWAR (38.6), as well as the all-time Washington, D.C., baseball record for home runs and RBI (includes the first and second iterations of the Washington Senators and the present-day Nationals, but excludes the Expos).

On March 21, 2022, the Nationals announced that they would retire Zimmerman's number 11, making him the first Nationals player to receive that honor. The ceremony took place on June 18, the 16th anniversary of his first career walk-off home run. Upon his retirement, Zimmerman remained a part of the Nationals organization, as he had a 5 year, $10 million personal services contract with the team as a part of his 6 year, $100 million contract extension in 2012.

In March 2025, Zimmerman announced that he would be partnering with Nationals broadcaster Dan Kolko to host a podcast called "The 11th Inning with Kolko & Zim" where they "talk Nats baseball, the world of sports, and more" with special guests.

== Personal life ==
Zimmerman's mother, Cheryl, was diagnosed with multiple sclerosis in 1995 and has needed to use a wheelchair since 2000. Zimmerman has cited his mother's condition as a substantial formative influence on his development, saying that it forced him to grow up and assume responsibilities at an earlier age than most children. He also founded the ziMS Foundation, which is dedicated to treating and curing multiple sclerosis.

Zimmerman became engaged to Heather Downen, a tech-firm sales representative, in April 2012, and they married in January 2013. The couple welcomed their first child, a daughter, in November 2013. Their second daughter was born in June 2016. Their third child, a son, was born in May 2020. They reside in Great Falls, Virginia.

== Al Jazeera controversy ==
On January 5, 2016, it was announced that Zimmerman had filed a lawsuit suing Al Jazeera for defamation following the publication's release of the documentary "The Dark Side: Secrets of the Sports Dopers", which linked Zimmerman and Philadelphia Phillies first baseman Ryan Howard, among others, to a clinic that allegedly distributed steroids and HGH.

Awards and achievements
Preceded by Garrett Atkins	Topps Rookie All-Star Third Baseman; 2006	Succeeded by Ryan Braun
Preceded by Freddie Freeman	National League; Player of the Month; April 2017	Succeeded by Charlie Blackmon
