= Richmond Rebels =

Information
- Location: Richmond, Virginia
- Ballpark: Lee Park (renamed Boulevard Field, now The Diamond)
- Founded: 1912
- Disbanded: 1912
- League championships: None
- Former league: United States Baseball League
- Colors: Steel-gray, white, black
- Ownership: Ernest Landgraf
- Manager: Alfred Newman

The Richmond Rebels were one of eight teams in the United States Baseball League, and were based in Richmond, Virginia. The league collapsed within two months of its creation from May 1 to June 24, 1912. The Rebels were managed by Alfred Newman and owned by Ernest Landgraf.

== 1912 standings ==
In the United States Baseball League's only season, the Rebels finished 2nd in the league with a 15-11 record. The league had originally planned to have a 126-game season, but failed to have any team play 27 games.

Team	Win	Loss	Pct
Pittsburgh Filipinos	19	7	.731
Richmond Rebels	15	11	.577
Reading (no name)	12	9	.571
Cincinnati Cams	12	10	.545
Washington Senators	6	7	.462
Chicago Green Sox	10	12	.455
Cleveland Forest City	8	13	.381
New York Knickerbockers	2	15	.118

On the USBL's opening day on May 1, more than 9,000 fans saw the Rebels defeat the Washington Senators 2-0. The umpire was Arlie Latham.

== Notable players ==
- Socks Seybold

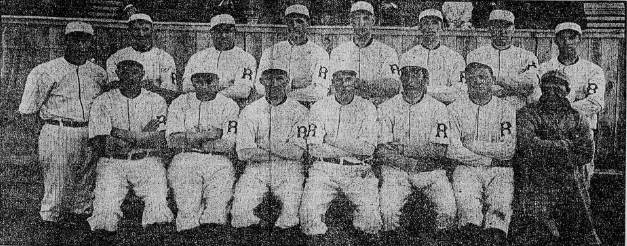
The team picture of the Richmond Rebels prior to their opening day game against the Senators.
