= Washington Senators (1912) =

Information
- League: United States Baseball League
- Location: Washington, D.C.
- Ballpark: Georgetown Park
- Founded: 1912
- Disbanded: 1912
- League championships: None
- Former name: Senators (1912); Bandits (1913)
- Ownership: Hugh McKinnon
- Manager: George Browne

The Washington Senators was one of eight teams of the United States Baseball League. The league folded after just over a month of play in 1912. The Senators were owned by Hugh McKinnon and managed by George Browne.

== 1912 Standings ==
Team	Win	Loss	Pct
Pittsburgh Filipinos	19	7	.731
Richmond Rebels	15	11	.577
Reading (no name)	12	9	.571
Cincinnati Cams	12	10	.545
Washington Senators	6	7	.462
Chicago Green Sox	10	12	.455
Cleveland Forest City	8	13	.381
New York Knickerbockers	2	15	.118

In the USBL's only year, the Senators finished fifth place at 6-7, playing the fewest games of any team. The first game they played was on May 1, against Richmond, a 2-0 loss before 9,000 fans. It is one of the few known results of any of the USBL teams. Washington finished 6—7 and 5th in the league.

== Roster ==
1912 Washington Senators
Roster
Pitchers	Big Jeff Pfeffer	Catchers Infielders	Outfielders	Manager: George Browne
