= Gunther Park =

Baseball park in Chicago, Illinois

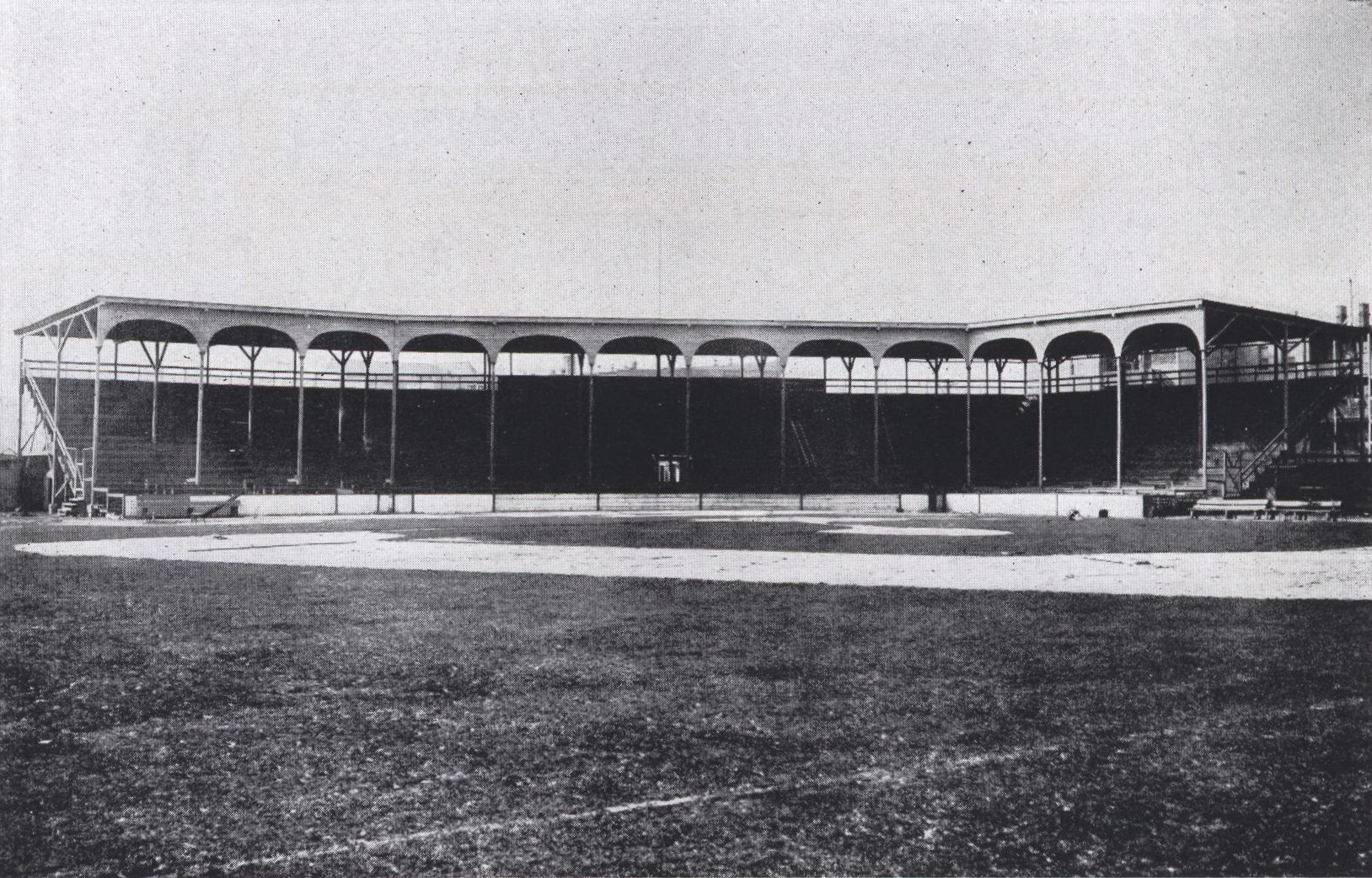
- Gunther Park, c. 1913
- Location: Chicago, IL
- Capacity: 5,000
- Surface: grass

Construction
- Built: 1905
- Closed: 1913

Tenants
- Gunther Nine (1905-1913); Chicago Green Sox (1912)

Gunther Park (now Chase Park) was a baseball park in Chicago, Illinois. The field site was a large block bounded by North Ashland Avenue (west, home plate); Hills Court (north, left field); buildings and North Clark Street (east, center field); and Leland Avenue (south, right field) and was built in 1905. It was just 11 blocks north of the eventual site of Wrigley Field, and held a capacity of approximately 5,000.

A handful of local amateur football and baseball games were played at the location in late autumn of 1904, the first being held on November 2.[Chicago Tribune, November 3, 1904, p. 8] The venue was initially called "Gunther's Park".

After housing the Gunther Nine of the Chicago City League and the Chicago Green Sox of the outlaw and short-lived United States Baseball League, as well as many other local amateur sporting events, the site was redeveloped in 1920. It was converted into a recreational park for the benefit of the Ravenswood district, with tennis courts, basketball courts, playgrounds, baseball fields, soccer fields, and pools. It was renamed in honor of Salmon P. Chase.
