= Reading (United States Baseball League) =

Information
- Location: Reading, Pennsylvania
- Founded: 1912
- Disbanded: 1912
- League championships: None
- Former league: United States Baseball League
- Colors: Blue-gray, black
- Ownership: William Witmann
- Manager: Leo Groom

Reading was one of 8 teams in the "outlaw" United States Baseball League based in Reading, Pennsylvania. The league folded after just over a month of play. Reading was the only team in the league without a nickname.

== 1912 Standings ==
Reading finished 3rd at 12-9 in the USBL's only season.

Team	Win	Loss	Pct
Pittsburgh Filipinos	19	7	.731
Richmond Rebels	15	11	.577
Reading (no name)	12	9	.571
Cincinnati Cams	12	10	.545
Washington Senators	6	7	.462
Chicago Green Sox	10	12	.455
Cleveland Forest City	8	13	.381
New York Knickerbockers	2	15	.118

== Notable players ==
- Jack Cronin
