= Lou Gertenrich =

American baseball player (1875–1933)

- Outfielder
- Born: May 4, 1875; Chicago, Illinois, U.S.
- Died: October 20, 1933 (aged 58); Chicago, Illinois, U.S.
- Batted: Right Threw: Right

MLB debut
- September 15, 1901, for the Milwaukee Brewers

Last MLB appearance
- July 21, 1903, for the Pittsburgh Pirates

MLB statistics
- Games played: 3
- At bats: 6
- Hits: 1
- Stats at Baseball Reference

Teams
- Milwaukee Brewers (1901); Pittsburgh Pirates (1903)

Louis Wilhelm Gertenrich (May 4, 1875 – October 20, 1933) was an American professional baseball player. He played parts of two seasons in Major League Baseball as an outfielder for the Milwaukee Brewers and Pittsburgh Pirates.
