= Burt Keeley =

American baseball player (1879-1952)

- Pitcher
- Born: November 2, 1879; Wilmington, Illinois, U.S.
- Died: May 3, 1952 (aged 72); Winton, Minnesota, U.S.
- Batted: Right Threw: Right

MLB debut
- April 18, 1908, for the Washington Senators

Last MLB appearance
- May 14, 1909, for the Washington Senators

MLB statistics
- Games: 30
- ERA: 3.32
- Strikeouts: 68
- Stats at Baseball Reference

Teams
- Washington Senators (1908–1909)

Burton Elwood Keeley (November 2, 1879 – May 3, 1952) was an American Major League Baseball pitcher. Keeley played for the Washington Senators in 1908 and 1909.
