= United States Baseball League =

Former professional baseball league in the United States

- Sport: Baseball
- Founded: 1912
- First season: 1912
- Folded: 1912
- CEO: William Abbott Witmann
- No. of teams: 8
- Country: United States
- Last champion: Pittsburgh Filipinos (1912) but only partial season

The United States Baseball League was a short-lived prospective third major professional baseball league that was established in New York City in 1912 and lasted only one partial season.

== History ==
In March 1912, organizers of the proposed league – described by members of the sports establishment as an "outlaw league" – met in New York's Hotel Imperial. The U.S. Baseball League subsequently organized teams in Chicago, Cincinnati, Cleveland, Pittsburgh, New York, Reading, Pennsylvania; Richmond, Virginia; and Washington, D.C. The league president was William Witmann.

Sports historian Rudolf K. Haerle observed that the U.S. Baseball League "stressed the inherent 'good' of baseball for all individuals and communities, and indicated that it wished to conduct its business in the accepted capitalist style–free competition in the marketplace". Despite these lofty ambitions, the league quickly incurred the scorn and hostility of the baseball establishment. Additionally burdened with weak leadership, limited financing, poor attendance, and a lack of skillful players, the U.S. Baseball League "folded after about one month of action".

=== Legacy ===
Many sports historians view the U.S. Baseball League as "a major precursor to the Federal League of 1914–1915". The Federal League, which was the last independent major league, was financed by magnates including oil "baron" Harry F. Sinclair.

== Teams ==
USBL teams
- Chicago Green Sox
- Cincinnati Cams/Pippins
- Cleveland Forest City
- New York Knickerbockers
- Pittsburgh Filipinos
- Reading
- Richmond Rebels
- Washington Senators

== Standings ==
The league's regular season began May 1, 1912 and ended June 5. The Richmond Times Dispatch released the intended 126-game USL schedule, to have run from April 8 through September 22.

Team	Win	Loss	Pct
Pittsburgh Filipinos	19	7	.731
Richmond Rebels	15	11	.577
Reading (no name)	12	9	.571
Cincinnati Cams	12	10	.545
Washington Senators	6	7	.462
Chicago Green Sox	10	12	.455
Cleveland Forest City	8	13	.381
New York Knickerbockers	2	15	.118

== Ballparks ==
- Bronx Oval – New York
- Exposition Park – Pittsburgh
- The Fairgrounds – Lynchburg
- Georgetown Park – Washington, D.C.
- Hippodrome Park – Cincinnati, Ohio (also referred to as United States Park)
- Gunther Park (Clark St and Leland Ave) – Chicago; now Chase Park
- National Association Grounds – Cleveland
- Lee Park (Moore Street and North Boulevard) – Richmond; became Boulevard Field of the Richmond Climbers in 1917, and now The Diamond
