= 1914 Indianapolis Hoosiers season =

1914 Indianapolis Hoosiers
- Federal League champions
- League: Federal League
- Ballpark: Federal League Park
- City: Indianapolis, Indiana
- Record: 88–65 (.575)
- League place: 1st
- Owners: Harry F. Sinclair
- Managers: Bill Phillips

The 1914 Indianapolis Hoosiers season was a season in American baseball. The Hoosiers won the inaugural Federal League championship, finishing 88–65, 1½ games ahead of the Chicago Federals.

== Offseason ==
- Prior to 1914 season: Frank Harter jumped to the Hoosiers from the Cincinnati Reds.

== Regular season ==
The offensive star of the team was outfielder Benny Kauff, who led the league in batting average (.370), runs scored (120), and stolen bases (75). Future Hall of Famers Edd Roush and Bill McKechnie also saw significant playing time, and Indianapolis scored a league-high 762 runs. Their rotation ace, Cy Falkenberg, went 25–16 with a 2.22 earned run average; he topped the circuit with 236 strikeouts.

=== Season standings ===
Federal League
Team	W	L	Pct.	GB	Home	Road
Indianapolis Hoosiers	88	65	.575	—	53‍–‍23	35‍–‍42
Chicago Federals	87	67	.565	1½	43‍–‍34	44‍–‍33
Baltimore Terrapins	84	70	.545	4½	53‍–‍26	31‍–‍44
Buffalo Buffeds	80	71	.530	7	47‍–‍29	33‍–‍42
Brooklyn Tip-Tops	77	77	.500	11½	47‍–‍32	30‍–‍45
Kansas City Packers	67	84	.444	20	37‍–‍36	30‍–‍48
Pittsburgh Rebels	64	86	.427	22½	37‍–‍37	27‍–‍49
St. Louis Terriers	62	89	.411	25	32‍–‍43	30‍–‍46

=== Record vs. opponents ===
1914 Federal League record Sources:
Team	BAL	BKF	BUF	CWH	IND	KC	PRB	SLT
Baltimore	—	9–13	14–8–1	12–10	10–12–1	12–10	10–12–2	17–5–1
Brooklyn	13–9	—	11–11–1	9–13	3–19	11–11–1	17–5–1	13–9
Buffalo	8–14–1	11–11–1	—	10–12–1	11–10	12–10–1	13–7	15–7
Chicago	10–12	13–9	12–10–1	—	13–9–1	14–8	12–10	13–9–1
Indianapolis	12–10–2	19–3	10–11	9–13–1	—	13–9–1	12–10	13–9
Kansas City	10–12	11–11	10–12–1	8–14	9–13–1	—	11–10	8–12
Pittsburgh	12–10–2	5–17	7–13–1	10–12	10–12	10–11	—	10–11–1
St. Louis	5–17–1	9–13	7–15	9–13–1	9–13	12–8	11–10	—

=== Roster ===
1914 Indianapolis Hoosiers
Roster
Pitchers: Harry Billiard; Cy Falkenberg; Frank Harter; Ed Henderson; George Kaiserling; Katsy Keifer; Ralph McConnaughey; Earl Moseley; George Mullin; Fred Ostendorf; Charlie Whitehouse; Clarence Woods	Catchers: Bill Rariden; George Textor; Bill Warren; Infielders: Charlie Carr; Biddy Dolan; Jimmy Esmond; Frank LaPorte; Bill McKechnie; Frank Rooney; Carl Vandagrift	Outfielders: Everitt Booe; Vin Campbell; Al Kaiser; Benny Kauff; Edd Roush; Al Scheer	Manager: Bill Phillips

== Player stats ==
=== Batting ===
==== Starters by position ====
Note: Pos = Position; G = Games played; AB = At bats; H = Hits; Avg. = Batting average; HR = Home runs; RBI = Runs batted in

Pos	Player	G	AB	H	Avg.	HR	RBI
C	Bill Rariden	131	396	93	.235	0	47
1B	Charlie Carr	115	441	129	.293	3	69
2B	Frank LaPorte	133	505	157	.311	4	107
SS	Jimmy Esmond	151	542	160	.295	2	49
3B	Bill McKechnie	149	570	173	.304	2	38
OF	Al Scheer	120	363	111	.306	3	45
OF	Vin Campbell	134	544	173	.318	7	44
OF	Benny Kauff	154	571	211	.370	8	95

==== Other batters ====
Note: G = Games played; AB = At bats; H = Hits; Avg. = Batting average; HR = Home runs; RBI = Runs batted in

Player	G	AB	H	Avg.	HR	RBI
Al Kaiser	59	187	43	.230	1	16
Edd Roush	74	166	54	.325	1	30
Carl Vandagrift	43	136	34	.250	0	9
Biddy Dolan	32	103	23	.223	1	15
George Textor	22	57	10	.175	0	4
Bill Warren	26	50	12	.240	0	5
Frank Rooney	12	35	7	.200	1	8
Everitt Booe	20	31	7	.226	0	6

=== Pitching ===
==== Starting pitchers ====
Note: G = Games pitched; IP = Innings pitched; W = Wins; L = Losses; ERA = Earned run average; SO = Strikeouts

Player	G	IP	W	L	ERA	SO
Cy Falkenberg	49	377.1	25	16	2.22	236
Earl Moseley	43	316.2	19	18	3.47	205
George Kaiserling	37	275.1	17	10	3.11	75
Katsy Keifer	1	9.0	1	0	2.00	2

==== Other pitchers ====
Note: G = Games pitched; IP = Innings pitched; W = Wins; L = Losses; ERA = Earned run average; SO = Strikeouts

Player	G	IP	W	L	ERA	SO
George Mullin	36	203.0	14	10	2.70	74
Harry Billiard	32	125.2	8	7	3.72	45
Ralph McConnaughey	7	26.0	0	2	4.85	7
Charlie Whitehouse	8	26.0	2	0	4.85	10
Frank Harter	6	24.2	1	2	4.01	8
Ed Henderson	2	10.0	1	0	4.50	1

==== Relief pitchers ====
Note: G = Games pitched; W = Wins; L = Losses; SV = Saves; ERA = Earned run average; SO = Strikeouts

Player	G	W	L	SV	ERA	SO
Clarence Woods	2	0	0	1	4.50	1
Fred Ostendorf	1	0	0	0	22.50	0

== Notes ==
Preceded by First Season	Federal League Championship Season; 1914	Succeeded by Chicago Whales; 1915
