= 1915 Newark Peppers season =

1915 Newark Peppers
- League: Federal League
- Ballpark: Harrison Park
- City: Newark, New Jersey
- Record: 80–72 (.526)
- League place: 5th
- Owners: Harry F. Sinclair
- Managers: Bill Phillips, Bill McKechnie

The 1915 Newark Peppers season was a season in American baseball. After the 1914 season, the Indianapolis Hoosiers' remaining interest was purchased by Harry F. Sinclair and moved from Indianapolis, Indiana to Newark, New Jersey. The club also sold one of its top players, Benny Kauff, to the Brooklyn Tip-Tops to offset financial losses. After winning the Federal League championship the previous year, the Peppers dropped to fifth place. They finished 80–72, six games behind the Chicago Whales.

== Regular season ==
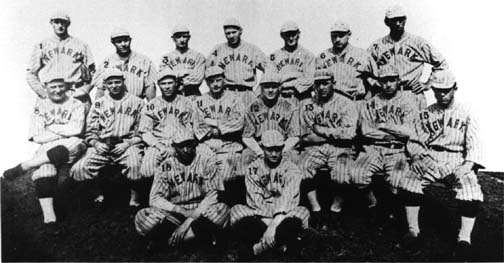
Members of the 1915 Newark Peppers

=== Season standings ===
Federal League
Team	W	L	Pct.	GB	Home	Road
Chicago Whales	86	66	.566	—	44‍–‍32	42‍–‍34
St. Louis Terriers	87	67	.565	—	43‍–‍34	44‍–‍33
Pittsburgh Rebels	86	67	.562	½	45‍–‍31	41‍–‍36
Kansas City Packers	81	72	.529	5½	46‍–‍31	35‍–‍41
Newark Peppers	80	72	.526	6	40‍–‍39	40‍–‍33
Buffalo Blues	74	78	.487	12	37‍–‍40	37‍–‍38
Brooklyn Tip-Tops	70	82	.461	16	34‍–‍40	36‍–‍42
Baltimore Terrapins	47	107	.305	40	24‍–‍51	23‍–‍56

=== Record vs. opponents ===
1915 Federal League record Sources:
Team	BAL	BKF	BUF	CWH	KC	NWK	PRB	SLT
Baltimore	—	7–15	8–14	9–13	4–18	6–16	5–17	8–14
Brooklyn	15–7	—	9–11	7–15	11–11	12–10	9–13	7–15–1
Buffalo	14–8	11–9	—	8–14	11–11	11–11	9–13	10–12–1
Chicago	13–9	15–7	14–8	—	11–11	10–10–1	12–10–1	11–11–1
Kansas City	18–4	11–11	11–11	11–11	—	11–11	8–13	11–11
Newark	16–6	10–12	11–11	10–10–1	11–11	—	12–10–1	10–12–1
Pittsburgh	17–5	13–9	13–9	10–12–1	13–8	10–12–1	—	10–12–1
St. Louis	14–8	15–7–1	12–10–1	11–11–1	11–11	12–10–1	12–10–1	—

=== Roster ===
1915 Newark Pepper
Roster
Pitchers: Harry Billiard; Chick Brandom; Cy Falkenberg; George Kaiserling; Harry Moran; Earl Moseley; George Mullin; Ed Reulbach; Tom Seaton; Fred Trautman; Charlie Whitehouse	Catchers: Larry Pratt; Bill Rariden; George Textor; Bill Warren; Infielders: Hugh Bradley; Jimmy Esmond; Emil Huhn; Frank LaPorte; Bill McKechnie; Rupert Mills; Ted Reed; Larry Strands	Outfielders: Vin Campbell; Edd Roush; Germany Schaefer; Al Scheer; Gil Whitehouse	Manager: Bill McKechnie; Bill Phillips

== Player stats ==
=== Batting ===
==== Starters by position ====
Note: Pos = Position; G = Games played; AB = At bats; H = Hits; Avg. = Batting average; HR = Home runs; RBI = Runs batted in

Pos	Player	G	AB	H	Avg.	HR	RBI
C	Bill Rariden	142	444	120	.270	0	40
1B	Emil Huhn	124	415	94	.227	1	41
2B	Frank LaPorte	148	550	139	.253	3	56
SS	Jimmy Esmond	155	569	147	.258	4	62
3B	Bill McKechnie	127	451	113	.251	1	43
OF	Al Scheer	155	546	146	.267	2	60
OF	Edd Roush	145	551	164	.298	3	60
OF	Vin Campbell	127	525	163	.310	1	44

==== Other batters ====
Note: G = Games played; AB = At bats; H = Hits; Avg. = Batting average; HR = Home runs; RBI = Runs batted in

Player	G	AB	H	Avg.	HR	RBI
Germany Schaefer	59	154	33	.214	0	8
Rupert Mills	41	134	27	.201	0	16
Gil Whitehouse	35	120	27	.225	0	9
Ted Reed	20	77	20	.260	0	4
Larry Strands	35	75	14	.187	1	11
Hugh Bradley	12	33	5	.152	0	2
George Textor	3	6	2	.333	0	0
Larry Pratt	5	4	2	.500	0	0
Bill Warren	5	3	1	.333	0	1

=== Pitching ===
==== Starting pitchers ====
Note: G = Games pitched; IP = Innings pitched; W = Wins; L = Losses; ERA = Earned run average; SO = Strikeouts

Player	G	IP	W	L	ERA	SO
Ed Reulbach	33	270.0	21	10	2.23	117
Earl Moseley	38	268.0	15	15	1.91	142
George Kaiserling	41	261.1	15	15	2.24	75
Harry Moran	34	205.2	13	9	2.54	87
Cy Falkenberg	25	172.0	9	11	3.24	76
Tom Seaton	12	75.0	2	6	2.28	28
George Mullin	5	32.1	2	2	5.85	14

==== Other pitchers ====
Note: G = Games pitched; IP = Innings pitched; W = Wins; L = Losses; ERA = Earned run average; SO = Strikeouts

Player	G	IP	W	L	ERA	SO
Charlie Whitehouse	11	39.2	2	2	4.31	18

==== Relief pitchers ====
Note: G = Games pitched; W = Wins; L = Losses; SV = Saves; ERA = Earned run average; SO = Strikeouts

Player	G	W	L	SV	ERA	SO
Chick Brandom	16	1	1	0	3.40	15
Harry Billiard	14	0	1	1	5.72	7
Fred Trautman	1	0	0	0	6.00	2
Gil Whitehouse	1	0	0	0	0.00	0
