= Frank Rooney (baseball) =

American baseball player (1884-1977)

- First baseman
- Born: October 12, 1884; Poděbrady, Bohemia, Austria-Hungary
- Died: April 6, 1977 (aged 92); Bessemer, Michigan, U.S.
- Batted: left Threw: left

Major league debut
- April 18, 1914, for the Indianapolis Hoosiers

Last major league appearance
- June 6, 1914, for the Indianapolis Hoosiers

Major league statistics
- Batting average: .200
- Home runs: 1
- Runs batted in: 8
- Stats at Baseball Reference

Teams
- Indianapolis Hoosiers (1914)

Frank Rooney (born Frank Rovný; October 12, 1884 – April 6, 1977) was an American professional baseball first baseman who played in the Federal League. He played for the Indianapolis Hoosiers during the 1914 season. He is one of four players born in what is now the Czech Republic to appear in an MLB game (Note: The others were John Stedronsky (1879), Frank Meek (1889–1890), and Josef Koukalik (1904).). He was the first Czech-born player to hit a home run in the major leagues and the most recent one to appear in an MLB game.

He is buried in Hurley, Wisconsin.
