= Carl Vandagrift =

American baseball player (1883–1920)

- Second baseman
- Born: April 22, 1883; Cantrall, Illinois, U.S.
- Died: October 9, 1920 (aged 37); Fort Wayne, Indiana, U.S.
- Batted: Right Threw: Right

MLB debut
- May 19, 1914, for the Indianapolis Hoosiers

Last MLB appearance
- October 5, 1914, for the Indianapolis Hoosiers

MLB statistics
- Batting average: .250
- Home runs: 0
- Runs batted in: 9
- Stats at Baseball Reference

Teams
- Indianapolis Hoosiers (1914)

Carl William Vandagrift (April 22, 1883 – October 9, 1920) was an American Major League Baseball infielder. He played 43 games, primarily as a second baseman but also as a third baseman and shortstop, in 1914 for the Indianapolis Hoosiers.
