= Biddy Dolan =

American baseball player (1881–1950)

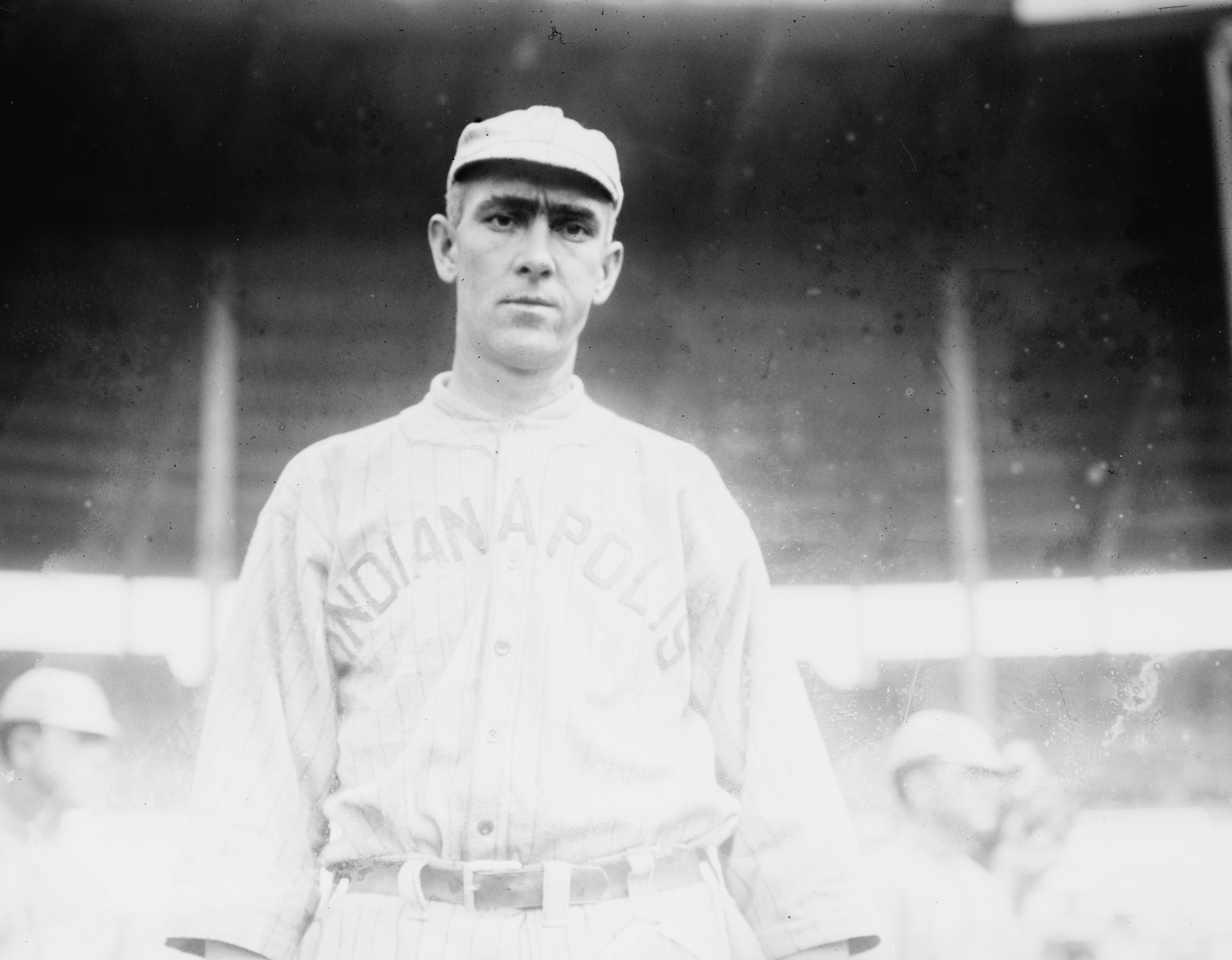
- First baseman
- Born: July 9, 1881; Onalaska, Wisconsin, U.S.
- Died: July 15, 1950 (aged 69); Indianapolis, Indiana, U.S.
- Batted: Right Threw: Right

MLB debut
- April 16, 1914, for the Indianapolis Hoosiers

Last MLB appearance
- June 8, 1914, for the Indianapolis Hoosiers

MLB statistics
- Batting average: .223
- Home runs: 1
- Runs batted in: 15
- Stats at Baseball Reference

Teams
- Indianapolis Hoosiers (1914)

Leon Mark "Biddy" Dolan (July 9, 1881 – July 15, 1950) was an American Major League Baseball first baseman. He played in 32 games in 1914 for the Indianapolis Hoosiers.
