= Frank Harter =

American baseball player (1886–1959)

- Pitcher
- Born: September 19, 1886; Keyesport, Illinois, U.S.
- Died: April 14, 1959 (aged 72); Breese, Illinois, U.S.
- Batted: Right Threw: Right

MLB debut
- August 31, 1912, for the Cincinnati Reds

Last MLB appearance
- June 9, 1914, for the Indianapolis Hoosiers

MLB statistics
- Win–loss record: 3–5
- Strikeouts: 30
- Earned run average: 3.67
- Stats at Baseball Reference

Teams
- Cincinnati Reds (1912–1913); Indianapolis Hoosiers (1914)

Franklin Pierce Harter (September 19, 1886 – April 14, 1959) was an American Major League Baseball pitcher. He pitched in parts of three seasons in the majors, from 1912 until 1914, for the Cincinnati Reds and Indianapolis Hoosiers.
