= Edd Roush =

American baseball player (1893–1988)

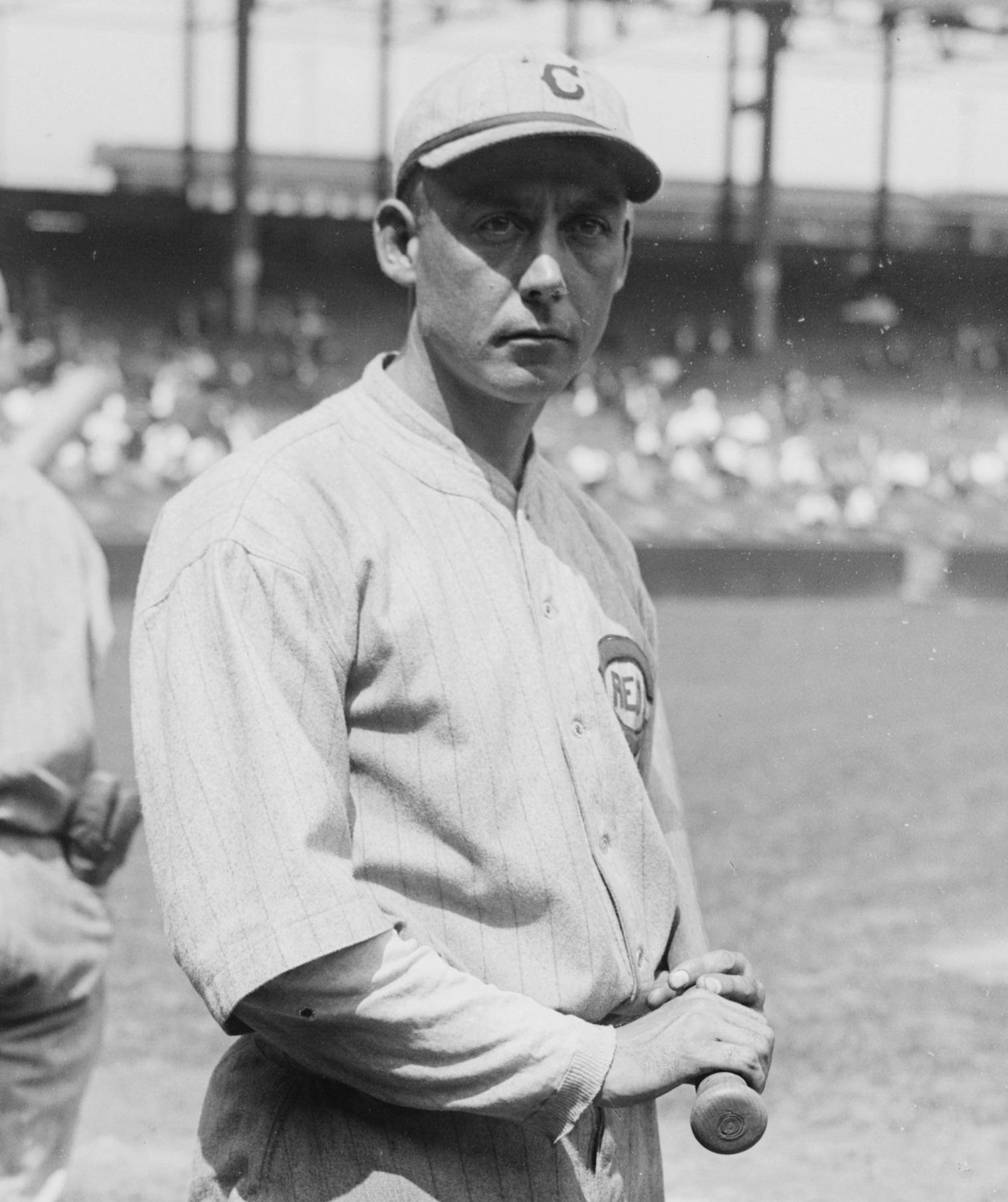
- Edd Roush with the Cincinnati Reds in 1923
- Center fielder
- Born: May 8, 1893; Oakland City, Indiana, U.S.
- Died: March 21, 1988 (aged 94); Bradenton, Florida, U.S.
- Batted: Left Threw: Left

MLB debut
- August 20, 1913, for the Chicago White Sox

Last MLB appearance
- September 27, 1931, for the Cincinnati Reds

MLB statistics
- Batting average: .323
- Hits: 2,376
- Home runs: 68
- Runs batted in: 981
- Stats at Baseball Reference

Teams
- Chicago White Sox (1913); Indianapolis Hoosiers / Newark Peppers (1914–1915); New York Giants (1916); Cincinnati Reds (1916–1926); New York Giants (1927–1929); Cincinnati Reds (1931)

Career highlights and awards
- World Series champion (1919); 2× NL batting champion (1917, 1919); Cincinnati Reds Hall of Fame

Member of the National

Baseball Hall of Fame
- Induction: 1962
- Election method: Veterans Committee

Edd J. Roush (May 8, 1893 – March 21, 1988) was an American professional baseball player and coach. He played in Major League Baseball as a center fielder from 1913 to 1931, most prominently as a member of the Cincinnati Reds where he was a two-time National League (NL) batting champion and led the team to the 1919 World Series championship. He also played for the New York Giants, Chicago White Sox as well as the Newark Peppers and the Indianapolis Hoosiers of the Federal League. Roush accumulated a .323 batting average over his 18-year playing career and was elected to the National Baseball Hall of Fame in 1962.

== Early life ==
Roush was born in Oakland City, Indiana, on May 8, 1893, to parents Laura and William Roush, a dairy farmer. A twin, he and his brother Fred (not short for Edward or Frederick, respectively) each shared a middle initial of J, which was not short for any name. The boys worked on the dairy farm throughout childhood. Edd was left-handed, but he learned to throw and bat right-handed early in his career due to the fact that left-handed gloves were scarce in Oakland City.

He received the opportunity to play for the local semi-pro Oakland City Walkovers in 1909 after their regular outfielders failed to appear. After collecting two hits the first game he became a starting outfielder. In 1911, once he learned that other players were receiving $5 (equivalent to $93 in 2025) per game, he transferred to the rival Princeton, Indiana team. In 1912, he played for the Evansville, Indiana team in the Kentucky–Illinois–Tennessee League (KITTY). He performed well with the team and hit .284 in 1912 and .300 in 1913 when his contract was bought by the Chicago White Sox.

== Professional baseball career ==
=== Early career ===
Roush made his major league debut as a 20-year-old for the Chicago White Sox on August 20, 1913. After nine games he was sent to the minors to play for Lincoln Railsplitters of the Western League. After only ten games he quit and returned to Oakland City.

Roush joined the Indianapolis Hoosiers of the Federal League in 1914 and hit .325 through 74 games as the Hoosiers won the pennant. The Hoosiers became the Newark Peppers in 1915 and Roush continued to play outfield for the team under manager, and fellow 1962 Hall of Fame inductee Bill McKechnie. After the Federal League disbanded in early 1916, the Giants picked up Roush, McKechnie and Bill Rariden. Midway through the 1916 season, the Giants traded Roush, McKechnie, and Hall of Famer Christy Mathewson to the Cincinnati Reds.

=== Cincinnati Reds ===
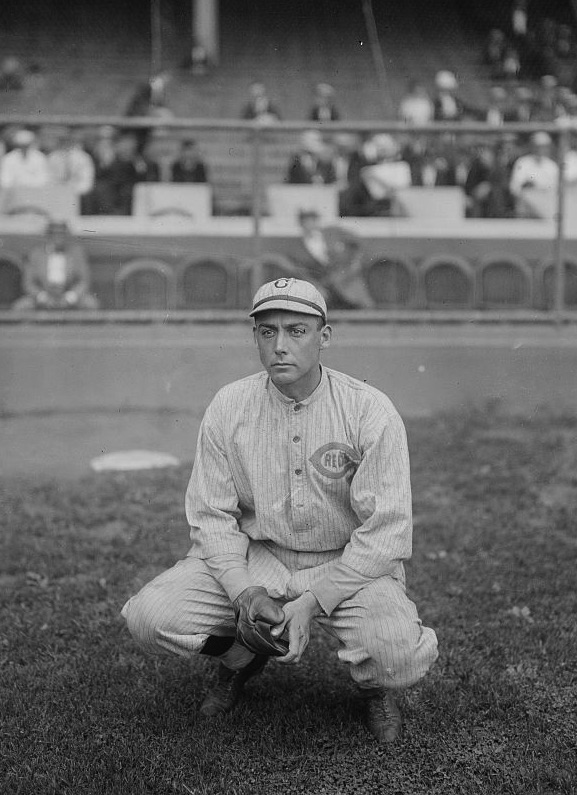
Roush, circa 1916

Roush played only 69 games with the Reds in 1916 and finished second in team batting average with .287, behind Hal Chase. 1917 was Roush's first full season with the Reds and by the end of August his batting average of .347 topped Rogers Hornsby who was in second place. An injured leg caused him to miss the final week of the season but Hornsby could not catch his .341 average. At season's end, Roush led the National League in batting average and finished third in hits with 178, only 4 behind leader Heinie Groh.

In 1918, Roush finished the season with a .333 average, .002 behind Hall of Famer Zack Wheat. On April 29, 1918, the Reds originally beat the St. Louis Cardinals, but a protested play caused the game to be replayed on August 11. The play in question involved Roush, who slid to make a catch in the outfield. After he juggled the ball, he secured it in his glove to make the out and threw to third base as the runner left before the catch was made. The Cardinals protested the play stating that the runner did not have to wait until the ball was settled into Roush's glove to begin running. They presented this to National League President John Heydler and won. The game was then replayed on August 11. This is significant because Roush went 2–3 in the initial game, and 1–4 in the replayed game. If the initial game stood then Roush would have finished the season 146 for 434 (a .336 batting average) instead of 145 for 435 (a .333 batting average). This would have made him batting champion for the second straight year.

Roush won his second batting title in 1919, when he led the league with a batting average of .321, and led the Cincinnati Reds to the World Series. The Reds won the 1919 World Series, known for the Black Sox Scandal, by winning five of the eight games. Throughout his life Roush would state that the Reds were the better team, and would have won the Series either way. Roush showed up for spring training in 1920, an occurrence rare enough that The Sporting News reported on it. Roush would hunt quail and rabbits at his home in Oakland City, Indiana right until a week before opening day. On June 8, 1920, a lengthy argument took place on the field, and Roush fell asleep in the outfield. After infielder Heinie Groh was unsuccessful at waking Roush up, Roush was ejected for delay of game. Roush hit .339, and set career highs in hits, doubles, triples, RBI, and total bases.

1921 would be the first of many holdouts that Roush would start. After his stellar 1920 season where he led the team in hits, triples, RBI, stolen bases and average, he argued that his salary of $15,000 (equivalent to $270,756 in 2025) was not enough. He failed to show up to spring training and continued to hold out until April 30 when he reached an agreement with the Reds. The Reds played poorly in 1921, and by the end of May they were 14–28. Roush had been sidelined a couple of times during the season with leg injuries, but he finished the year batting .385 over the last 37 games of the season to finish with a career-high .352 batting average, second to Rogers Hornsby.

Before the 1922 season would start, Roush entered negotiations with the Reds for the second straight year, this time demanding a 3-year contract for $18,000 (equivalent to $346,223 in 2025) per year. After the initial demand, Roush held out for months prompting The Sporting News to say:

He is the best silence keeper in baseball. Just says real early what he wants and then closes up. No gabbing or elaborate explanations. Transacts business the way he plays ball– no fuss, but exceedingly effective.

On July 26 Roush met with team president Gary Herrmann to negotiate a ten-week contract that would expire at the end of the season. After the contract was signed he put on a uniform and joined the in progress game against the Philadelphia Phillies. Over the 49 games he played in 1922 he hit for a .352 average. 1923 would start similarly to the previous two years with a new holdout by Roush; this time he demanded a $25,000 (equivalent to $472,412 in 2025) salary. The Reds countered with the salary he was making the previous season and began to fine him $50 per day of missed training camp. On April 15 the two sides reached an agreement. He missed time due to a fractured rib from August 29 to September 14, although it is still disputed when he broke the rib. He finished the year with a .351 average and led the league in doubles with 41.

In the off season before Opening Day in 1924 Roush signed a three-year $19,000 contract. During spring training, manager Pat Moran fell ill on the train ride to their training facilities in Florida, and on March 7, 1924, he died. In April Roush strained his side when he swung and missed at a pitch and was sidelined for eight games and would again be sidelined for nine games after he strained a muscle in his leg in St. Louis. Roush would finish the year with a .348 average and led the league with 21 triples. Roush became team captain of the Reds in 1925 and led the team to a third-place finish, a disappointing end to the season as the Reds led the league in ERA for the third year in a row.

On July 21, 1926, team officials celebrated "Roush Day" at Redland Field in honor Roush and his decade spent with the team. At the end of the season it was clear that with three younger outfielders, Curt Walker, Cuckoo Christensen and Rube Bressler, the Reds would part ways with the 34 year old Roush. In February 1927 Roush was traded to the Giants for George Kelly and an undetermined amount of cash. From 1917 to 1926 Roush hit .339 and collected over 1,600 hits. The Reds were trading the player with the highest career batting average for the team at that point. He had the most triples for the team for any player after 1900. From 1917 to 1926, he never had a batting average under .323.

=== Later career ===
Roush's career with the Giants started with a contract dispute. The Giants offered $19,000 (equivalent to $352,155 in 2025), and Roush rejected the offer, demanding $30,000 (equivalent to $556,034 in 2025). Roush met with John McGraw, the Giants manager, in a hotel room in Chattanooga, Tennessee to work out the details of the contract. After a back-and-forth discussion about how Roush did not want to play in New York, the two sides agreed to a three-year $70,000 (equivalent to $1,297,414 in 2025) contract.

In 1927 Roush had a down year for the third place Giants, and batted only .304, the lowest average since 1916. The following year he suffered torn muscles in his abdomen and only appeared in 46 games. After receiving surgery on the torn muscles in February, he returned to form and hit .324 over 115 games for the Giants.

In early 1930 Roush threatened to retire than to receive a pay cut. After the two sides could not agree on a number Roush held out for the whole season. When the Great Depression hit in late 1929, the Roush family was largely unaffected due to his frequent holdouts and salary demands. Roush spent the season with his family and played in benefit baseball games in Oakland City and Princeton. As the next season began, Roush refused to play for the Giants and retired from baseball. He was contacted by Reds President Sidney Weil to play for the team in 1931. After a short negotiation, both sides agreed to a one-year contract worth $15,000 (equivalent to $317,560 in 2025). Roush struggled in his last season in baseball, only managing to hit .271 in 101 games. In his final game he went 2–3 with a triple in a 5–3 loss against the pennant winning Cardinals.

Roush finished his 18-year career with a .323 lifetime average, 268 stolen bases and 182 triples. He never struck out more than 25 times in a season and had 30 inside-the-park home runs. Roush used a 48-ounce (1,400 g) Louisville Slugger, the heaviest bat used in baseball.

At the time of his retirement in 1931, he was second place behind Bid McPhee for hits and triples in Cincinnati Reds history. Hall of Fame pitcher Pete Alexander wrote of Roush, "Of all the batters I have faced ... Edd Roush and Ross Youngs are the trickiest. I won't say they are the hardest hitters but they are the trickiest, smartest."

== Later life and honors ==
Roush served one season as the Reds coach alongside his good friend, manager Bill McKechnie, who had previously been his teammate. During his career he had saved his money and was able to retire after he finished playing. He built a house in Bradenton, Florida, and used it as a winter residence. He frequently attended spring training and told stories of the old days. Roush spent most of his time in his hometown of Oakland City, where he served on the town and school boards and ran the Montgomery cemetery for 35 years.

He was one of the 22 players interviewed by Lawrence Ritter and included in the original version of The Glory of Their Times, a ground-breaking book that set a standard for oral histories of baseball.

Roush was elected to the National Baseball Hall of Fame in 1962 via the Veterans Committee. In addition to Roush's selection into the Baseball Hall of Fame, chosen with McKechnie, he is also a member of the Cincinnati Reds Hall of Fame, inducted in 1960.

Considered the greatest player in Reds' history at the time, Roush was invited to throw out the first ball at the last game at Crosley Field on June 24, 1970. Joe Morgan called Roush "the best of us all".

In 1981, Ritter and Donald Honig included Roush in their book The 100 Greatest Baseball Players of All Time.

Roush died at the age of 94 on March 21, 1988, in Bradenton, Florida. At the time of his death he was the last surviving Federal League participant and the last surviving 1919 World Series participant.

== See also ==
- List of Major League Baseball career batting average leaders
- List of Major League Baseball career hits leaders
- List of Major League Baseball career triples leaders
- List of Major League Baseball career runs scored leaders
- List of Major League Baseball batting champions
- List of Major League Baseball annual doubles leaders
- List of Major League Baseball annual triples leaders
