= Fred Ostendorf =

American baseball player (1892-1965)

- Pitcher
- Born: August 5, 1892; Baltimore, Maryland, US
- Died: March 2, 1965 (aged 72); Kecoughtan, Virginia, US
- Batted: Left Threw: Left

MLB debut
- July 16, 1914, for the Indianapolis Hoosiers

Last MLB appearance
- July 16, 1914, for the Indianapolis Hoosiers

MLB statistics
- Pitching record: 0-0
- Strikeouts: 0
- Earned run average: 22.50
- Stats at Baseball Reference

Teams
- Indianapolis Hoosiers 1914

Frederick K. Ostendorf (August 5, 1892 – March 2, 1965) was an American professional baseball player who played in one game for the Indianapolis Hoosiers of the Federal League during the 1914 season.

He was born in Baltimore, Maryland and died in Kecoughtan, Virginia at the age of 72.
