= Ralph McConnaughey =

American baseball player (1889–1966)

- Pitcher
- Born: August 5, 1889; Homer City, Pennsylvania, US
- Died: June 4, 1966 (aged 76); Detroit, Michigan, US
- Batted: Right Threw: Right

MLB debut
- July 8, 1914, for the Indianapolis Hoosiers

Last MLB appearance
- August 11, 1914, for the Indianapolis Hoosiers

MLB statistics
- Win–loss record: 0–2
- Earned run average: 4.85
- Strikeouts: 7
- Stats at Baseball Reference

Teams
- Indianapolis Hoosiers (1914)

Ralph Jamison McConnaughey (August 5, 1889 – June 4, 1966) was an American professional baseball pitcher who played for the Indianapolis Hoosiers of the Federal League in 1914.
