= Katsy Keifer =

American baseball player (1891-1927)

- Pitcher
- Born: September 3, 1891; California, Pennsylvania, U.S.
- Died: February 19, 1927 (aged 35); Outwood, Kentucky, U.S.
- Batted: Both Threw: Left

MLB debut
- October 8, 1914, for the Indianapolis Hoosiers

Last MLB appearance
- October 8, 1914, for the Indianapolis Hoosiers

MLB statistics
- Win–loss record: 1-0
- Earned run average: 2.00
- Strikeouts: 2
- Stats at Baseball Reference

Teams
- Indianapolis Hoosiers (1914)

Sherman Carl "Katsy" Keifer (September 3, 1891 – February 19, 1927) was an American pitcher in Major League Baseball. He played for the Indianapolis Hoosiers in 1914, having made his professional debut in 1913 with the Class D Traverse City Resorters of the Michigan State League.
