= Clarence Woods (baseball) =

American baseball player (1892–1969)

- Pitcher
- Born: June 11, 1892; Woods Ridge, Indiana
- Died: July 2, 1969 (aged 77); Rising Sun, Indiana
- Batted: Right Threw: Right

MLB debut
- August 8, 1914, for the Indianapolis Hoosiers

Last MLB appearance
- August 16, 1914, for the Indianapolis Hoosiers

MLB statistics
- Win–loss record: 0–0
- Earned run average: 4.50
- Strikeouts: 1
- Stats at Baseball Reference

Teams
- Indianapolis Hoosiers (1914)

Clarence Cofield Woods (June 11, 1892 – July 2, 1969) was a professional baseball pitcher. He appeared in two games in Major League Baseball for the Indianapolis Hoosiers of the Federal League in 1914.
