= Assist (baseball) =

Baseball statistic

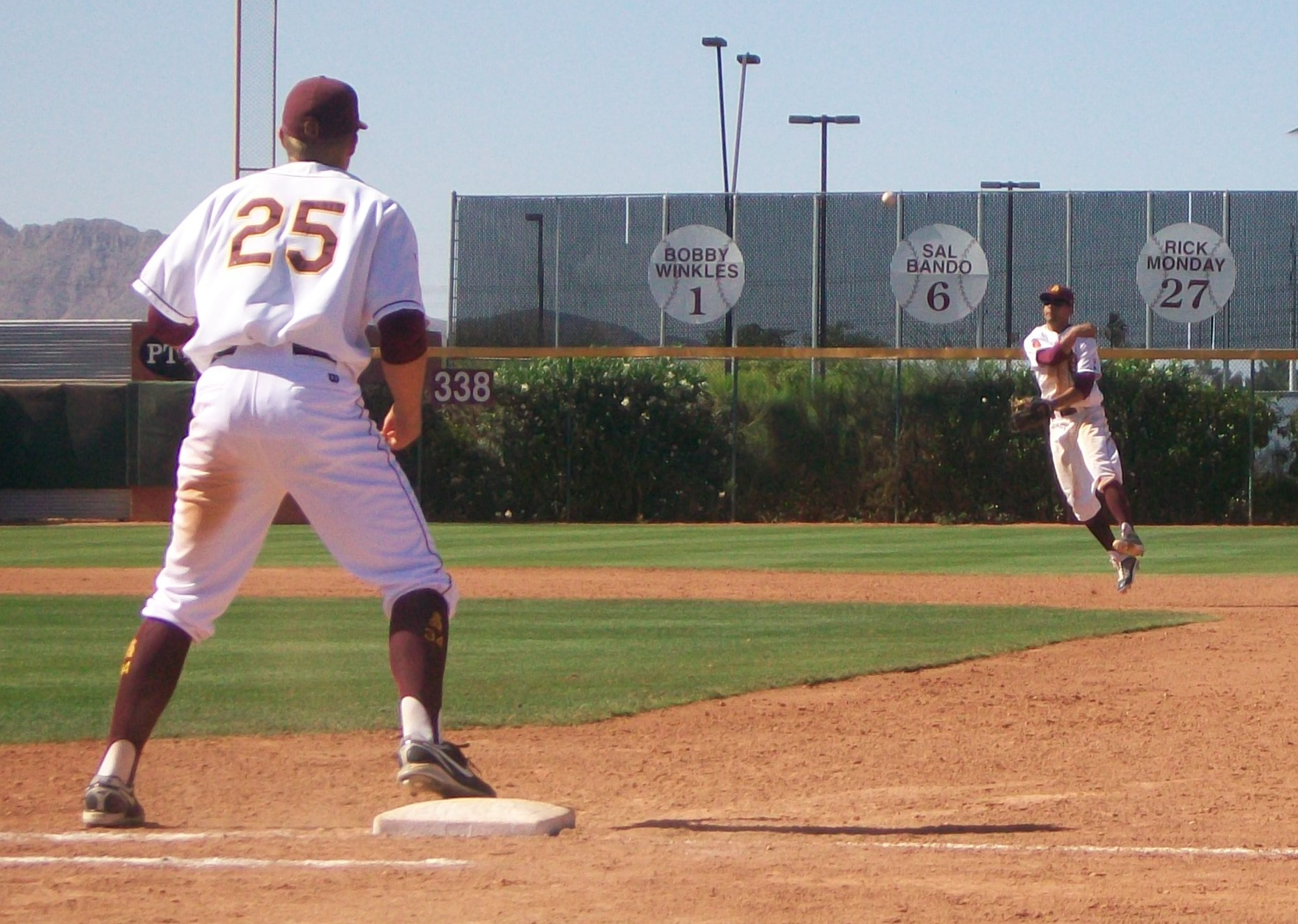
The shortstop (at right) has fielded the ball and thrown it to the first baseman; if the batter is put out, the shortstop will be credited with an assist.

In baseball, an assist (denoted by A) is a defensive statistic, baseball being one of the few sports in which the defensive team controls the ball. An assist is credited to every defensive player who fields or touches the ball (after it has been hit by the batter) prior to the recording of a putout, even if the contact was unintentional. For example, if a ball strikes a player's leg and bounces off him to another fielder, who tags the baserunner, the first player is credited with an assist. A fielder can receive a maximum of one assist per out recorded. An assist is also credited if a putout would have occurred, had another fielder not committed an error. For example, a shortstop might field a ground ball cleanly, but the first baseman might drop his throw. In this case, an error would be charged to the first baseman, and the shortstop would be credited with an assist.

If a pitcher records a strikeout where the third strike is caught by the catcher, the pitcher is not credited with an assist. However, if the batter becomes a baserunner on a dropped third strike and the pitcher is involved in recording a putout by fielding the ball and either tagging the runner out or throwing to first base for the out, the pitcher is credited with an assist just as any other fielder would be.

Assists are an important statistic for outfielders, as a play often occurs when a baserunner on the opposing team attempts to advance on the basepaths when the ball is hit to the outfield (even on a caught fly ball that results in an out; see tag up). It is the outfielder's job to field the ball and make an accurate throw to another fielder who is covering the base before the runner reaches it. The fielder then attempts to tag the runner out. This is especially important if the runner was trying to reach home plate, as the assist and tag prevent the baserunner from scoring a run. Assists are much rarer for outfielders than infielders (with the exception of first basemen) because the play is harder to make, and also because outfielder assist situations occur less often than the traditional ground-ball assist for a shortstop, second baseman, or third baseman. However, as a result, outfield assists are worth far more than infield assists, and tell more about an outfielder's throwing arm than infielder assists do.

In recent years, some sabermetricians have begun referring to assists by outfielders as baserunner kills. Some sabermetricians are also using baserunner holds as a statistic to measure outfield arms. A baserunner hold occurs when the baserunner does not attempt to advance an extra base on an outfielder out of concern of being thrown out by a strong, accurate throw. This can be combined with baserunner kills for better accuracy, as runners often do not try for an extra base when an outfielder with an excellent arm is playing.

== All-time single-season assists leaders by position ==
=== First base ===
1. Albert Pujols: 185 (St. Louis Cardinals, 2009)
2. Bill Buckner: 184 (Boston Red Sox, 1985)
3. Mark Grace: 180 (Chicago Cubs, 1990)
4. Mark Grace: 167 (Chicago Cubs, 1991)
5. Sid Bream: 166 (Pittsburgh Pirates, 1986)
6. Bill Buckner: 161 (Chicago Cubs, 1983)
7. Bill Buckner: 159 (Chicago Cubs, 1982)
8. Bill Buckner: 157 (Boston Red Sox, 1986)
9. Todd Helton: 156 (Colorado Rockies, 2003)
10. Mickey Vernon: 155 (Cleveland Indians, 1949)

Career

1. Eddie Murray: 1865
2. Todd Helton: 1728
3. Jeff Bagwell: 1703
4. Keith Hernandez: 1682
5. Mark Grace: 1665
6. George Sisler: 1529
7. Mickey Vernon: 1448
8. Fred McGriff: 1447
9. Albert Pujols: 1429
10. Andrés Galarraga: 1376
11. Fred Tenney: 1363
12. Bill Buckner: 1351
13. Jake Beckley: 1315

=== Second base ===
1. Frankie Frisch: 641 (St. Louis Cardinals, 1927)
2. Hughie Critz: 588 (Cincinnati Reds, 1926)
3. Rogers Hornsby: 582 (New York Giants, 1927)
4. Ski Melillo: 572 (St. Louis Browns, 1930)
5. Ryne Sandberg: 571 (Chicago Cubs, 1983)
6. Rabbit Maranville: 568 (Pittsburgh Pirates, 1924)
7. Frank Parkinson: 562 (Philadelphia Phillies, 1922)
8. Tony Cuccinello: 559 (Boston Braves, 1936)
9. Johnny Hodapp: 557 (Cleveland Indians, 1930)
10. Lou Bierbauer: 555 (Pittsburgh Pirates, 1892)

=== Shortstop ===
1. Ozzie Smith: 621 (San Diego Padres, 1980)
2. Glenn Wright: 601 (Pittsburgh Pirates, 1924)
3. Dave Bancroft: 598 (Philadelphia Phillies/New York Giants, 1920)
4. Tommy Thevenow:597 (St. Louis Cardinals, 1926)
5. Iván DeJesús: 595 (Chicago Cubs, 1977)
6. Cal Ripken: 583 (Baltimore Orioles, 1984)
7. Whitey Wietelmann: 581 (Boston Braves, 1943)
8. Dave Bancroft: 579 (New York Giants, 1922)
9. Rabbit Maranville: 574 (Boston Braves, 1914)
10. Don Kessinger: 573 (Chicago Cubs, 1968)

=== Third base ===
1. Graig Nettles: 412 (Cleveland Indians, 1971)
2. Graig Nettles: 410 (New York Yankees, 1973)
3. Brooks Robinson: 410 (Baltimore Orioles, 1974)
4. Brooks Robinson: 405 (Baltimore Orioles, 1967)
5. Harlond Clift: 405 (St. Louis Browns, 1937)
6. Mike Schmidt: 404 (Philadelphia Phillies, 1974)
7. Doug DeCinces: 399 (California Angels, 1982)
8. Brandon Inge: 398 (Detroit Tigers, 2006)
9. Clete Boyer: 396 (New York Yankees, 1962)
10. Mike Schmidt: 396 (Philadelphia Phillies, 1977)
11. Buddy Bell: 396 (Texas Rangers, 1982)

=== Catcher ===
1. Bill Rariden: 238 (Newark Peppers [Federal League], 1915)
2. Bill Rariden: 215 (Indianapolis Hoosiers [Federal League], 1914)
3. Pat Moran: 214 (Boston Beaneaters [National League], 1903)
4. Oscar Stanage: 212 (Detroit Tigers, 1911)
5. Art Wilson: 212 (Chicago Whales [Federal League], 1914)
6. Gabby Street: 210 (Washington Senators, 1909)
7. Frank Snyder:204 (St. Louis Cardinals, 1915)
8. George Gibson: 203 (Pittsburgh Pirates, 1910)
9. Bill Bergen: 202 (Brooklyn Superbas, 1909)
10. Claude Berry: 202 (Pittsburgh Rebels [Federal League], 1914)

=== Pitcher ===
1. Ed Walsh: 227 (Chicago White Sox, 1907)
2. Will White: 223 (Cincinnati Red Stockings [American Association], 1883)
3. Ed Walsh: 190 (Chicago White Sox, 1908)
4. Harry Howell: 178 (St. Louis Browns, 1905)
5. Tony Mullane: 177 (Louisville Eclipse [American Association], 1882)
6. John Clarkson: 174 (Chicago White Stockings [National League], 1885)
7. John Clarkson: 172 (Boston Beaneaters [National League], 1889)
8. Jack Chesbro: 166 (New York Highlanders, 1904)
9. George Mullin: 163 (Detroit Tigers, 1904)
10. Ed Walsh: 160 (Chicago White Sox, 1911)

=== Left field ===
1. Harry Stovey: 38 (Philadelphia Athletics, 1889)
2. Jimmy Sheckard: 36 (Brooklyn Superbas, 1903)
3. Jimmy Sheckard: 32 (Chicago Cubs, 1911)
4. Tilly Walker: 30 (St. Louis Browns, 1914)
5. Duffy Lewis: 29 (Boston Red Sox, 1913)
6. Duffy Lewis: 28 (Boston Red Sox, 1910)
7. Max Carey: 27 (Pittsburgh Pirates, 1913)
8. Duffy Lewis: 27 (Boston Red Sox, 1911)
9. Bobby Veach: 26 (Detroit Tigers, 1920)
10. Goose Goslin: 26 (Washington Senators, 1923)
11. Billy Hamilton: 26 (Philadelphia Phillies, 1890)
12. Joe Kelley: 26 (Brooklyn Superbas, 1899)
13. Jimmy Sheckard: 26 (Chicago Cubs, 1912)

=== Center field ===
1. Hardy Richardson: 45 (Buffalo Bisons, 1881)
2. Charlie Duffee: 43 (St. Louis Browns, 1889)
3. Jim Fogarty: 42 (Philadelphia Quakers, 1889)
4. Tom Brown: 39 (Louisville Colonels, 1893)
5. Tom Brown: 37 (Louisville Colonels, 1892)
6. Jimmy Ryan: 36 (Chicago White Stockings, 1889)

=== Right field ===
1. Orator Shafer: 50 (Chicago White Stockings, 1879)
2. Hugh Nicol: 48 (St. Louis Browns, 1884)
3. Chuck Klein: 44 (Philadelphia Phillies, 1930)
4. Tommy McCarthy: 44 (St. Louis Browns, 1888)
5. Jimmy Bannon: 43 (Boston Beaneaters, 1894)
6. Orator Shafer: 41 (Buffalo Bisons, 1883)
7. Jim Lillie: 41 (Buffalo Bisons, 1884)
8. Mike Mitchell: 39 (Cincinnati Reds, 1907)
9. Jim Fogarty: 39 (Philadelphia Quakers, 1887)
10. Tommy McCarthy: 38 (St. Louis Browns, 1888)
11. King Kelly: 38 (Chicago White Stockings, 1883)
