= Federal League Park =

Former American sporting venue

- Federal Park, Greenlawn Park
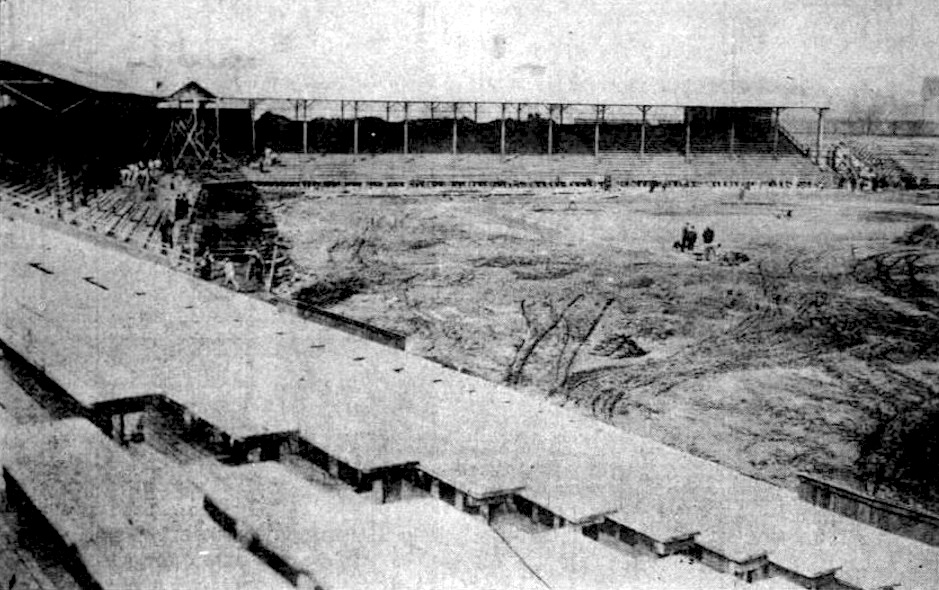
- Federal League Park in 1914
- Address: Kentucky Avenue & West Street; Indianapolis, Indiana; U.S.
- Coordinates: 39°45′39.59″N 86°10′3.77″W
- Capacity: 23,000

Construction
- Built: 1913
- Demolished: 1916

Tenants
- Indianapolis Hoosiers

Federal League Park is the name of two different former baseball parks in Indianapolis, Indiana, United States. Both were used by Indianapolis Hoosiers of the Federal League.

== First Federal League Park ==
The first of the two Federal League Parks in Indianapolis

The first Federal League Park was built within Riverside Park for the 1913 season, when the Federal League was still considered a minor league. Its location was typically given as "30th Street and Riverside Park" in local advertisements.

== Second Federal League Park ==
The second Federal League Park, also known as Federal Park, was built on part of the property known as Greenlawn Park, a former cemetery.

In 1914, the Federal League declared itself to be a major league, and a new Federal League Park was built for the Indianapolis franchise.

The street location of the park was conventionally given in newspapers and city directories as "Kentucky Avenue and West Street". The location is more precisely described as Kentucky Avenue and a railroad track (southeast, center field); Oliver Street (south, right field); White River (some distance west, first base); and "Old Greenlawn Cemetery" (north, third base). Henry Street teed into Kentucky across from the left field area. West Street itself intersected Kentucky (and still does) about half a block to the northeast of the ballpark, where Kentucky ends and South Street begins.

The dimensions of the Kentucky Avenue ballpark were:

- Left field – 365 feet (111 m)
- Left center – 421 feet (128 m)
- Center field – 428 feet (130 m)
- Right center – 351 feet (107 m)
- Right field – 304 feet (93 m)
- Backstop – 62 feet (19 m)

The Indianapolis franchise was transferred to Newark for the 1915 season. The Federal League itself disbanded after 1915. The park was used by the Indianapolis ABCs during 1915 and 1916. Early in 1917, it was demolished and replaced with a freight yard for nearby railroads.

Coincidentally, the site of this short-lived ballpark is very close to current professional sports facilities in the city. The Kentucky-West-South intersection is just a block south of Victory Field and a block west of Lucas Oil Stadium.

== See also ==
- List of baseball parks in Indianapolis
- List of former Major League Baseball stadiums
