= Harry Billiard =

American baseball player (1883–1923)

- Pitcher
- Born: November 11, 1883; Monroe, Indiana, U.S.
- Died: June 23, 1923 (aged 39); Wooster, Ohio, U.S.
- Batted: Right Threw: Right

MLB debut
- July 31, 1908, for the New York Highlanders

Last MLB appearance
- October 3, 1915, for the Newark Pepper

MLB statistics
- Win–loss record: 8–8
- Earned run average: 3.95
- Strikeouts: 62
- Stats at Baseball Reference

Teams
- New York Highlanders (1908); Indianapolis Hoosiers (1914); Newark Pepper (1915)

Harry Pree Billiard (November 11, 1883 – June 3, 1923), nicknamed "Pree", was an American Major League Baseball pitcher who played in 1908 with the New York Highlanders of the American League, then in 1914 with the Indianapolis Hoosiers, continuing with the team in 1915 when it moved and became the Newark Pepper. He batted and threw left-handed.

Billiard died of typhoid fever on June 3, 1923 in Wooster, Ohio.
