= George Mullin (baseball) =

American baseball player (1880–1944)

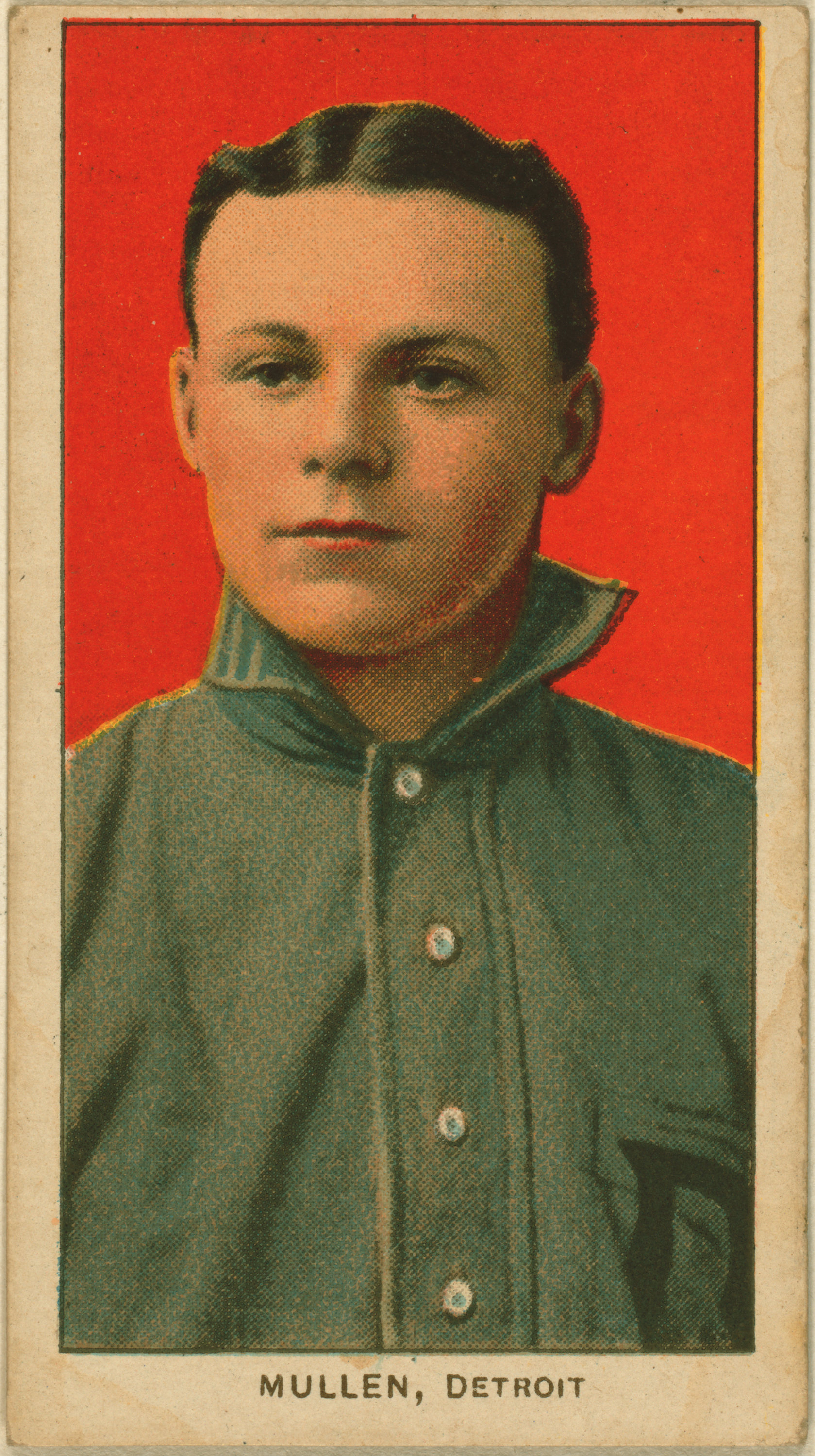
- Pitcher
- Born: July 4, 1880; Toledo, Ohio, U.S.
- Died: January 7, 1944 (aged 63); Wabash, Indiana, U.S.
- Batted: Right Threw: Right

MLB debut
- May 4, 1902, for the Detroit Tigers

Last MLB appearance
- May 23, 1915, for the Newark Pepper

MLB statistics
- Win–loss record: 228–196
- Earned run average: 2.82
- Strikeouts: 1,482
- Stats at Baseball Reference

Teams
- Detroit Tigers (1902–1913); Washington Senators (1913); Indianapolis Hoosiers (1914); Newark Pepper (1915)

Career highlights and awards
- AL wins leader (1909); Pitched a no-hitter on July 4, 1912

George Joseph Mullin (July 4, 1880 – January 7, 1944), sometimes known by the nickname "Wabash George", was an American right-handed baseball pitcher.

Mullin played in Major League Baseball for 14 seasons with the Detroit Tigers from 1902 to 1913, Washington Senators in 1913, and the Indianapolis Hoosiers/Newark Pepper of the Federal League from 1914 to 1915. He compiled a career record of 228–196 with a 2.82 earned run average (ERA) and 1,482 strikeouts. His 1,244 career assists ranks seventh among major league pitchers. Mullin was also a strong hitter, twice batting over .300 for a season and compiling a career batting average of .262.

In 12 seasons with Detroit, he helped the team win three consecutive American League pennants from 1907 to 1909. He had five 20-win seasons for the Tigers, led the American League with 29 wins in 1909, and ranks second in Detroit Tigers history with 209 wins. He also holds the Detroit Tigers' all-time club records with 3,394 innings pitched and 336 complete games and pitched the first no-hitter in Tigers' history on July 4, 1912.

== Early years ==
Mullin was born in 1880 in Toledo, Ohio, the son of Irish immigrants. He attended St. John's Jesuit High School in Toledo. From 1898 to 1901, he played semipro baseball in Wabash, Indiana, and South Bend, Indiana.

== Professional baseball ==
=== Fort Wayne ===
Mullin began playing professional baseball in 1901 with the Fort Wayne Railroaders of the Western Association. During the 1901 season, he appeared in 47 games and compiled a 21–20 record with a 3.48 ERA over 367 innings.

=== Detroit Tigers ===
==== Mautner controversy ====
Mullin's career with the Detroit Tigers began with controversy. Mullin signed to play for the Tigers late in the 1901 season. He subsequently signed a contract with Ned Hanlon's Brooklyn Superbas as well as having signed to play for the Fort Wayne club in 1902. The owner of the Fort Wayne club, Isadore Mautner, sought to have Mullin charged criminally with taking money under false pretenses and perjury. Mautner sent detectives to have Mullin arrested when the Tigers visited Chicago in April, but Mautner's plan was frustrated when Detroit officials moved Mullin (in disguise) out of the team hotel. In May, Mautner sought Mullin's extradition to Indiana, but the Governor of Indiana refused to sign the papers, concluding that the dispute was civil rather than criminal in nature. In July, Mullin was removed by police when the Tigers' train stopped in Fort Wayne on returning from St. Louis. A judge promptly released Mullin, holding that Mautner's remedy was a civil action for damages. Mullin quickly left town before Mautner could have a new warrant finalized.

Mautner later persuaded a grand jury to bring criminal charges against Mullin, and the saga continued to capture headlines well into 1903. In the end, the dispute was resolved in late 1903 with a payment of $1,000 to Mautner.

==== 1902–1906 ====
In his first season in Detroit, Mullin immediately showed his ability as a workhorse and as a batsman, but struggled with his pitch control and overall effectiveness. He appeared in 35 games for the 1902 Tigers, 30 of them as a starter and 25 of them complete games. He compiled a 13–16 record with a 3.67 ERA (slightly higher than the league average of 3.57). He also led the American League with 13 wild pitches and ranked fourth with 95 batters walked. At the plate, he compiled an impressive .325 batting average and .367 on-base percentage with four doubles, three triples, and 11 runs batted in (RBI).

One of the most impressive outings of Mullin's rookie year came on July 31, 1902, when he held Washington to only two hits and managed three hits and two runs in his own plate appearances. Two weeks later, on August 18, Mullin faced Boston's star pitcher Cy Young. The game ended in a 4–4 tie when the game was called due to darkness after 11 innings. Three of Boston's runs were scored on errors by Detroit's fielders. Mullin and Young met as starting pitchers 10 times over the next seven years; Mullin won six of those games to four for Young.

In 1903, Mullin improved markedly, reducing his ERA by almost a point-and-a-half to 2.25 (71 points below the league average of 2.96). He appeared in 41 games, threw 31 complete games, and compiled a 19–15 record. He ranked among the American League's leading pitchers with six shutouts (second), 41 games (second), 170 strikeouts (fifth), 320 2/3 innings pitched (fifth), and a 2.25 ERA (sixth). He also demonstrated athleticism on defense, leading the league's pitchers with 38 putouts and 108 assists. On the other hand, he continued to struggle with control as he led the league with 106 batters walked – the first of four consecutive years in which Mullin led the league in walks. On September 19, 1903, Mullin hit his first major league home run, described by the Detroit Free Press as a "mighty clout" that "lifted the ball over center field fence into Twenty-ninth street."

In 1904, Mullin had another strong year, pitching a club record 42 complete games with a 2.40 ERA (below the league average of 2.60). He again ranked among the league's leading pitchers with 42 complete games (second), 163 assists (second), seven shutouts (third), 382 1/3 innings pitched (fourth), 28 putouts (fourth), and 161 strikeouts (sixth). He also hit for a .290 batting average with a career-high 10 doubles. Despite Mullin's workhorse ability and impressive ERA, he ranked second in the league with 23 losses and led the league with 131 walks allowed 13 fielding errors. The 1904 Tigers team (one year before the arrival of Ty Cobb) was a weak-hitting group that compiled a .231 team batting average (nearly 60 points lower than Mullin) and finished in seventh place.

The 1905 season was Mullin's most durable. He pitched 382 1/3 innings, a figure that remains a Detroit Tigers club record. He compiled a 21–21 record and ranked among the league leaders with 1,428 batters faced (first), 382 1/3 innings pitched (first), 138 walks allowed (first), 41 games started (tied for first), 35 complete games (tied for first), 134 assists (second), 21 losses (third), 21 wins (fifth), and 168 strikeouts (sixth). His 2.51 ERA was slightly below the league average of 2.65.

In 1906, Mullin had his second consecutive 20-win season, compiling a 21–18 record in 40 starts. However, his ERA rose to 2.78, slightly higher than the league average of 2.69. And control issues persisted as he led the league in walks allowed for the fourth consecutive years.

==== 1907–1909 ====
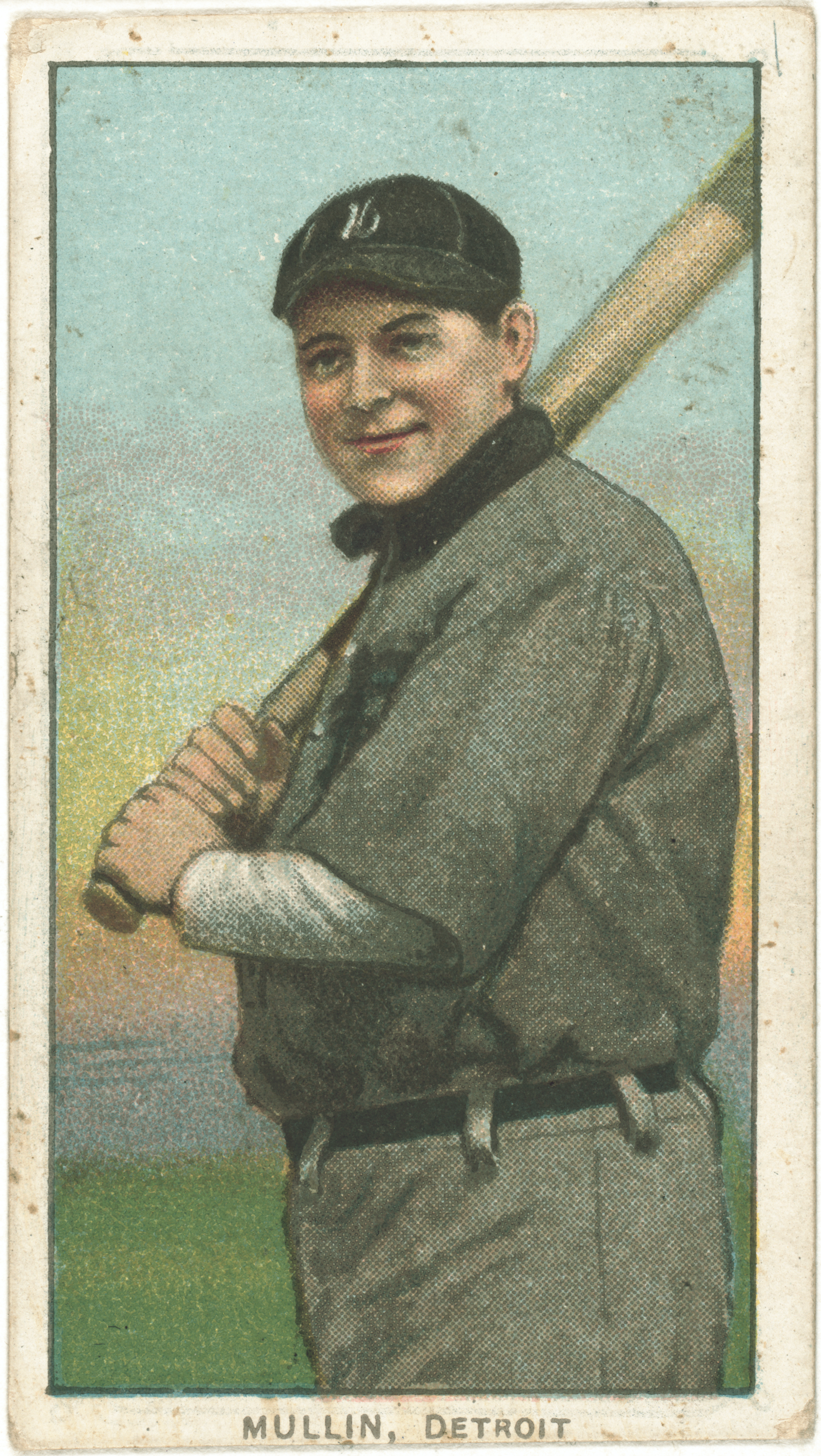
1909 Mullin baseball card

In 1907, the Detroit club hired Hughie Jennings as its manager, and with the bats of Ty Cobb and Sam Crawford, the team finally had a winning combination, as they won three straight American League pennants from 1907 to 1909. During the Tigers' pennant years, Mullin remained the pitching staff's workhorse, appearing in 125 games and compiling a 66–41 record with a 2.63 ERA.

Mullin's best season was 1909, when he started the season with a one-hitter on Opening Day and then recorded eleven consecutive wins. He did not lose a game until June 15, 1909, and went on to lead the American League in both wins (29) and win percentage (.784). His 11–0 start remained a Tigers record for 104 years, until it was surpassed in 2013 by Max Scherzer's 12–0 start.

In World Series play from 1907 to 1909, Mullin completed all six games he started and gave up only 12 earned runs in 58 innings, for a 1.86 ERA in World Series play. Despite strong pitching from Mullin, the Tigers lost each of the World Series from 1907 to 1909. Mullin had a 2.12 ERA in the 1907 World Series, but the Detroit bats went cold, and Mullin lost both games he started. In the 1908 World Series, Mullin pitched a complete-game shutout for a win. And in the 1909 World Series, Mullin appeared in four games and compiled a 2–1 record with a 2.25 ERA. In Game 4, he pitched a five-hit, 10-strikeout complete game against Honus Wagner's Pittsburgh Pirates. Mullin's 32 innings pitched in the 1909 World Series remains a World Series record for a seven-game series.

In November 1909, a group of Detroit Tigers players toured Cuba and played 12 exhibition games against two integrated Cuban teams, Habana and Almendares. Mullin was among the Tigers players who toured Cuba. The tour drew wide attention in Cuba, where baseball was already very popular. Demonstrating the high level of play in Cuba, the Tigers lost 8 of the 12 games to the integrated Cuban baseball teams. On November 27, 1909, Mullin shut out the Cuban Almendares team in a 4–0 victory for the touring Tigers.

==== 1910–1912 ====
Mullin continued as a winner and a workhorse in 1910 and 1911, with records of 21–12 and 18–10.

On April 20, 1912, with a crowd of 26,000 in attendance, Mullin was given the honor of pitching the first game at the new Navin Field, beating the Indians 6–5 in 11 innings. Mullin won his own game with an RBI single.

On May 21, 1912, Mullin shut out the Washington Senators, earning his 200th career win — a 2–0 pitching duel with Walter Johnson.

And on July 4, 1912 (Mullin's 32nd birthday), he pitched the first no-hitter in Detroit Tigers history, as Mullin helped himself with 3 hits and 2 RBIs in the game.

=== Detroit, Washington, and Montreal (1913) ===
In 1913, Mullin got off to a shaky 1–6 start, though his ERA remained respectable at 2.75. On May 16, 1913, the Tigers sold him to the Washington Senators for the waiver prices of $2,500. In Washington, Mullin joined a pitching staff led by Walter Johnson who won 36 games in 1913. Mullin appeared in only 11 games for the 1913 Washington team, compiling a 3–5 record and a career-high 5.02 ERA. In July 1913, Washington sold Mullin to the Montreal Royals of the International League.

=== Federal League (1914–15) ===
On January 1, 1914, Mullin announced that he had come to terms to play for the Indianapolis Hoosiers of the newly formed Federal League. He said at the time: "The fact that the Federals are willing to put two or three years' salary in the bank for players looks good to me." He enjoyed a one-year revival pitching for the Hoosiers in his home state of Indiana. His appeared in 36 games for the Hoosiers and compiled 14–10 record, and his 2.70 ERA ranked 10th in the Federal League. He also hit .312 with a .404 on-base percentage and 21 RBIs in 77 at bats.

In 1915, the Hoosiers moved east and became the Newark Pepper. Mullin played in only five games for the Newark club, compiling a 2–2 record and a 5.85 ERA. He appeared in his last Federal League game at age 34 on May 23, 1915; he was hit hard and driven from the game in the second inning. Mullin was released by Newark in late June.

Mullin concluded the 1915 season pitching for the Camden Athletic Club. He also pitched in 1916 for teams in Kokomo and Columbus, Indiana.

=== Career accomplishments and legacy ===
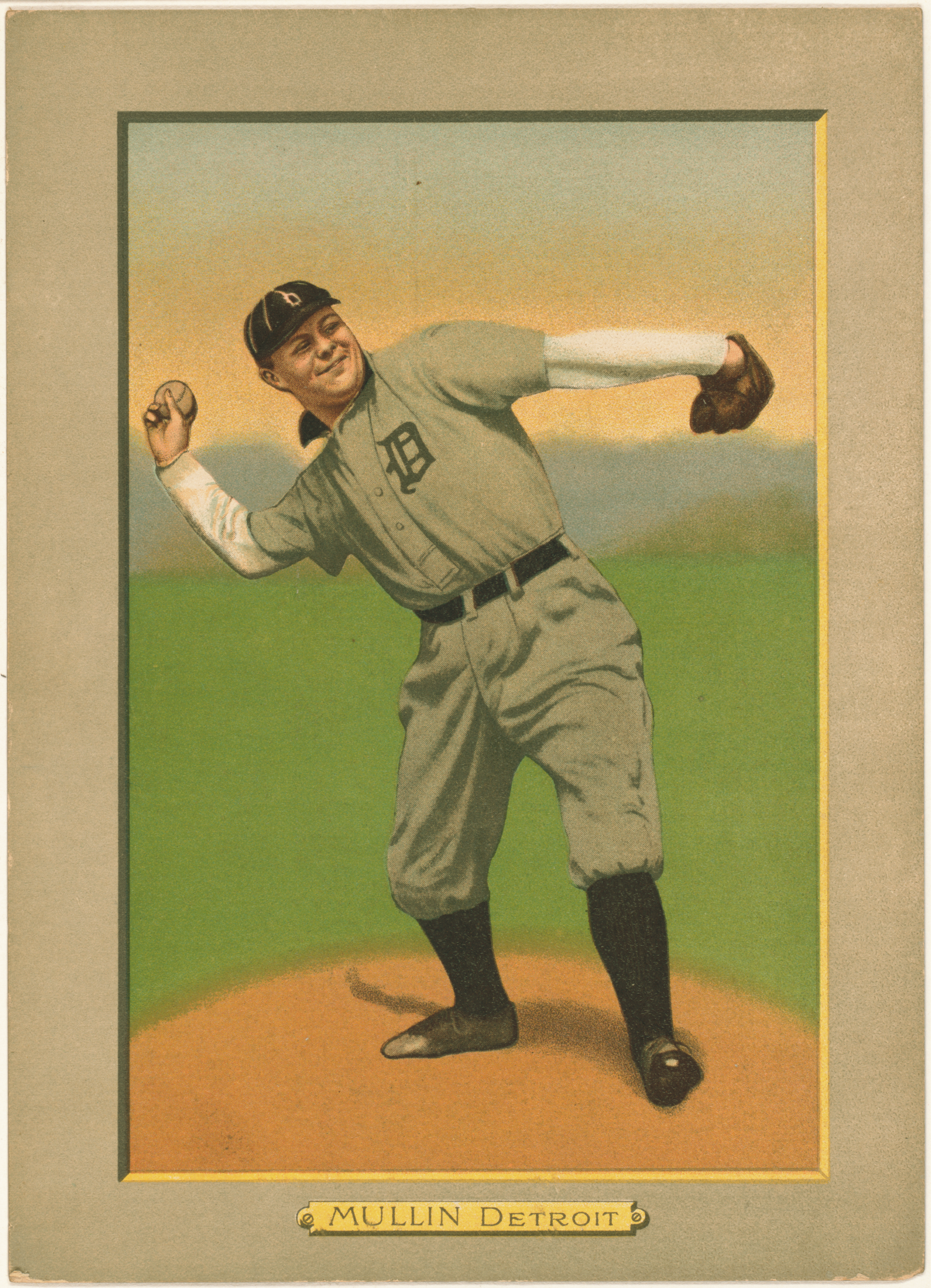
Tobacco chromolithograph 1911

Mullin had remarkable stamina as a pitcher. He started 428 games and had 353 complete game, the 25th highest total in major league history. He was among the American League leaders in complete games nine straight years (1903–1911) and innings pitched for eight straight years (1903–1910). His career highs were 42 complete games (1904) and 382 1/3 innings (1905), both Tigers team records. To this day, Mullin is the Tigers' all-time innings pitched leader, both in a career (3,394) and in a season (382 1/3).

Mullin was a powerfully built pitcher (often referred to as "burly") with an intimidating fastball, perhaps even more so due to his imperfect control. He hit batsmen 131 times in his career, the 19th highest total in major league history. He also threw 85 wild pitches and gave up 1,238 bases on balls, 45th most in major league history. He led the league in walks allowed four times (1903–1906), including a career-high 138 in 1905, and was among the league leaders in walks allowed 11 times.

An all-around athlete, Mullin had great range and ability to get to the ball. He contributed 1,244 assists as a pitcher, the seventh highest total of any pitcher in major league history, behind legends such as Cy Young, Christy Mathewson, Grover Cleveland Alexander, and Walter Johnson. His career record of 2.56 assists per game also ranks seventh in major league history for pitchers. He had a career-high 163 assists in 1904 and twice led the league in assists by a pitcher.

Mullin was also known for the tactics he used to try to keep batters off balance. The tactics included talking to batters when they came to bat, or even talking to himself. Longtime Detroit sports writer H. G. Salsinger wrote that, while Mullin had an excellent fastball and a good curveball, "most of his success was due to smartness rather than stuff." According to Salsinger, Mullin would try to distract batters with antics in between pitches – combing the pitcher's box, adjusting his belt, cleaning non-existent dirt from his glove, tying or removing his shoes –all in the hope of upsetting the batter and inducing him to swing at a bad pitch. On another occasion, Mullin and catcher Boss Schmidt hatched a successful scheme to induce Jack Chesbro to try to score from third base by bouncing a wild pitch off the stands so that it rebounded to Schmidt who then threw to Mullin for the tag on Chesbro.

Mullin also excelled as a batter. He had a career .262 batting average (401-for-1,531) with a .319 on-base percentage. He had 96 extra base hits (70 doubles, 23 triples, 3 home runs), 122 bases on balls, and 18 stolen bases. He hit three doubles in his first major league start and batted .325 in his rookie season. He was such a reliable hitter that he was used 101 times (with 21 hits) as a pinch hitter. On September 18, 1906, Mullin even pinch hit for Ty Cobb. Cobb was slumping and manager Bill Armour summoned Mullin to bat for Cobb in the bottom of the 9th inning. According to the next day's account in the Detroit Free Press, Mullin "hit center field with a triple."

Yet, as one author noted: "The pitching prowess and significant achievements of George Mullin seem to have faded away on the brittle pages of baseball history. Not even in the Motor City ... is the name of George Mullin, the burly right-hander from Wabash, Indiana, mentioned."

== Later years ==
Mullin was married to the former Grace Aukerman. They had a daughter, Beatrice (Mrs. Lemoine) Rish.

After retiring from baseball, Mullin took a job in 1919 with a motor truck company in Wabash, Indiana. In 1923, he was reportedly working as a police officer in Toledo, Ohio. In his later years, Mullin suffered from a long illness that reduced his weight to 100 pounds. He died in 1944 at age 63 in Wabash.

Mullin was posthumously inducted into the Michigan Sports Hall of Fame in 1962.

== See also ==
- List of Major League Baseball no-hitters
- List of Major League Baseball career wins leaders
- List of Major League Baseball annual saves leaders
- List of Major League Baseball annual wins leaders
- List of Major League Baseball career hit batsmen leaders

Preceded by Ed Walsh	No-hitter pitcher July 4, 1912	Succeeded by Earl Hamilton
