= Jimmy Esmond =

American baseball player (1889–1948)

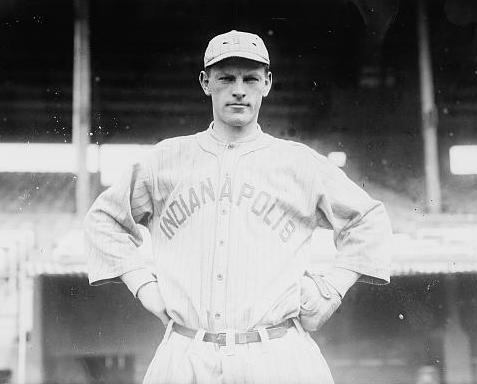
- Shortstop
- Born: August 8, 1889; Albany, New York, U.S.
- Died: June 6, 1948 (aged 58); Troy, New York, U.S.
- Batted: Right Threw: Right

MLB debut
- April 20, 1911, for the Cincinnati Reds

Last MLB appearance
- October 3, 1915, for the Newark Pepper

MLB statistics
- Batting average: .264
- Home runs: 8
- Runs batted in: 162
- Stats at Baseball Reference

Teams
- Cincinnati Reds (1911–1912); Indianapolis Hoosiers (1914); Newark Pepper (1915)

James Joseph Esmond (August 8, 1889 – June 26, 1948) was an American professional baseball player who played shortstop in the Major Leagues from 1911 to 1915. He would play for the Cincinnati Reds, Indianapolis Hoosiers, and Newark Peppers.

== See also ==
- List of Major League Baseball annual triples leaders
