= Charlie Whitehouse =

American baseball player (1894–1960)

- Pitcher
- Born: January 25, 1894; Charleston, Illinois, US
- Died: July 19, 1960 (aged 66); Indianapolis, Indiana, US
- Batted: Switch Threw: Left

MLB debut
- August 29, 1914, for the Indianapolis Hoosiers

Last MLB appearance
- July 5, 1919, for the Washington Senators

MLB statistics
- Win–loss record: 4-3
- Strikeouts: 33
- Earned run average: 4.52
- Stats at Baseball Reference

Teams
- Indianapolis Hoosiers (1914); Newark Peppers (1915); Washington Senators (1919)

Charles Evis Whitehouse (January 25, 1894 – July 19, 1960) was an American Major League Baseball pitcher. He played three seasons in the majors, two for the Indianapolis Hoosiers/Newark Peppers franchise of the Federal League in 1914 and 1915 and one for the Washington Senators in 1919

== Sources ==
- Career statistics from MLB · Baseball Reference · Baseball Reference (Minors) · Retrosheet · Baseball Almanac
