= Bill Warren (baseball) =

American baseball player (1884-1960)

- Catcher
- Born: February 11, 1884; Missouri, U.S.
- Died: January 28, 1960 (aged 75); Whiteville, Tennessee, U.S.
- Batted: Right Threw: Right

MLB debut
- April 30, 1914, for the Indianapolis Hoosiers

Last MLB appearance
- May 23, 1915, for the Newark Pepper

MLB statistics
- Batting average: .245
- Hits: 13
- Runs batted in: 6
- Stats at Baseball Reference

Teams
- Indianapolis Hoosiers/Newark Pepper (1914–1915)

William Hackney Warren (February 11, 1884 – January 28, 1960), nicknamed "Hack", was an American Major League Baseball player. Warren played for the Indianapolis Hoosiers/Newark Pepper of the Federal League in 1914 and 1915. He batted and threw right-handed.

He was born in Missouri and died at his home in Whiteville, Tennessee.
