= Al Scheer =

American baseball player (1888-1959)

- Outfielder
- Born: October 27, 1888; Groveport, Ohio, U.S.
- Died: May 6, 1959 (aged 70); Logansport, Indiana, U.S.
- Batted: Left Threw: Right

MLB debut
- August 2, 1913, for the Brooklyn Superbas

Last MLB appearance
- October 3, 1915, for the Newark Pepper

MLB statistics
- Batting average: .281
- Home runs: 5
- Runs batted in: 105
- Stats at Baseball Reference

Teams
- Brooklyn Superbas (1913); Indianapolis Hoosiers (1914); Newark Pepper (1915)

Allan George Scheer (October 27, 1888 – May 6, 1959) was an American professional baseball player who played outfield in the major leagues from 1913 to 1915.

In 281 games over three major league seasons, Scheer posted a .281 batting average (262-for-931) with 141 runs, 48 doubles, 20 triples, 5 home runs, 105 RBIs, 41 stolen bases, 116 bases on balls, .368 on-base percentage and .392 slugging percentage. He finished his career with a .954 fielding percentage playing at left and right field and several games at second base and shortstop.
