= Bill McKechnie =

American baseball player, coach, and manager (1886–1965)

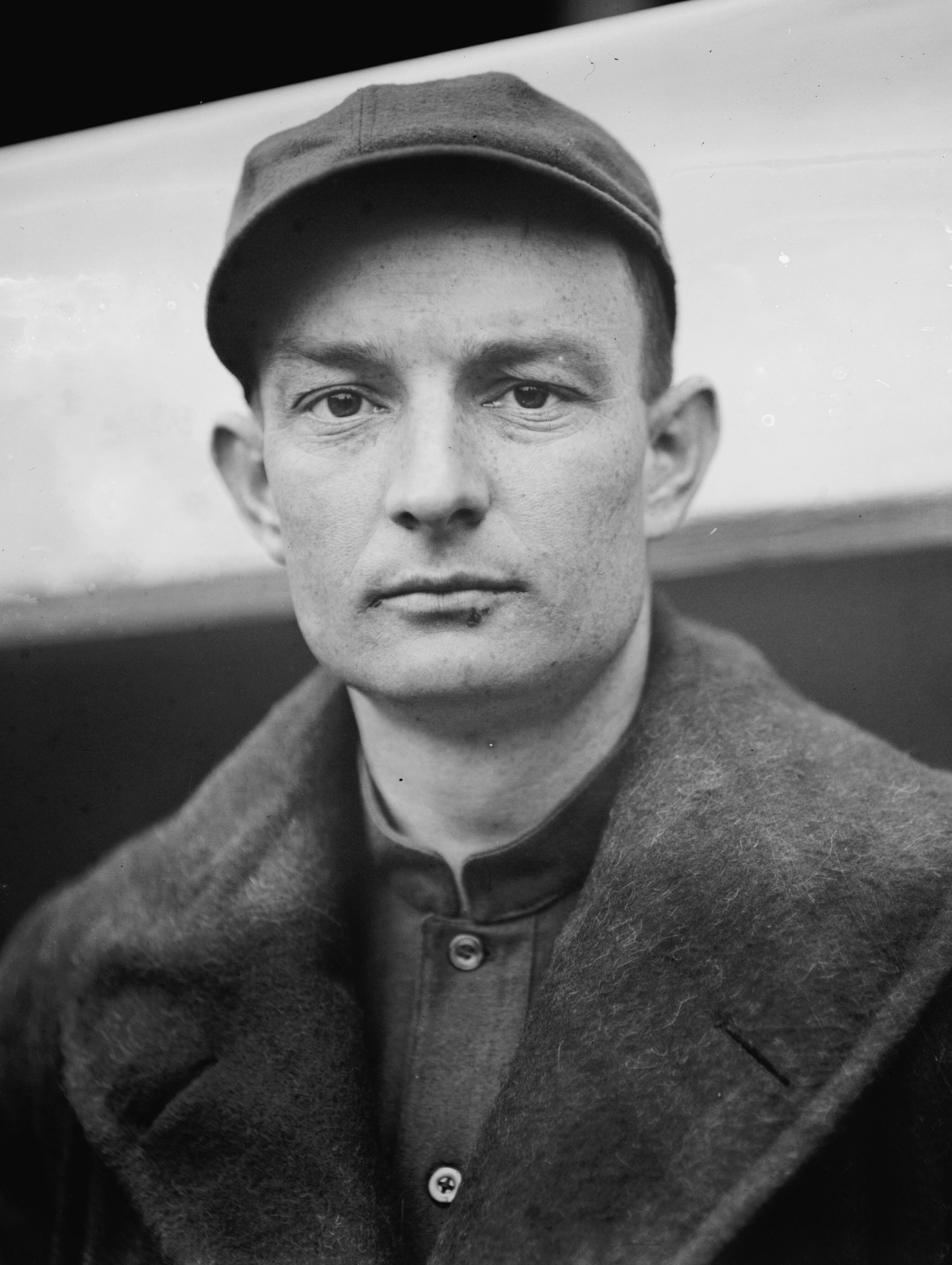
- Third baseman / Manager
- Born: August 7, 1886; Wilkinsburg, Pennsylvania, U.S.
- Died: October 29, 1965 (aged 79); Bradenton, Florida, U.S.
- Batted: Switch Threw: Right

MLB debut
- September 8, 1907, for the Pittsburgh Pirates

Last MLB appearance
- September 20, 1920, for the Pittsburgh Pirates

MLB statistics
- Batting average: .251
- Home runs: 8
- Runs batted in: 240
- Games managed: 3,647
- Managerial record: 1,896–1,723–28
- Winning %: .524
- Stats at Baseball Reference

Teams
- As player: Pittsburgh Pirates (1907, 1910–1912); Boston Braves (1913); New York Yankees (1913); Indianapolis Hoosiers/Newark Peppers (1914–1915); New York Giants (1916); Cincinnati Reds (1916–1917); Pittsburgh Pirates (1918, 1920); As manager: Newark Peppers (1915); Pittsburgh Pirates (1922–1926); St. Louis Cardinals (1928–1929); Boston Braves/Bees (1930–1937); Cincinnati Reds (1938–1946)

Career highlights and awards
- 2× World Series champion (1925, 1940); Cincinnati Reds Hall of Fame

Member of the National

Baseball Hall of Fame
- Induction: 1962
- Election method: Veterans Committee

William Boyd McKechnie (August 7, 1886 – October 29, 1965) was an American professional baseball player, manager and coach. He played in Major League Baseball (MLB) as a third baseman during the dead-ball era. McKechnie was the first manager to win World Series titles with two teams (1925 Pittsburgh Pirates and 1940 Cincinnati Reds), and remains one of only three managers to win pennants with three teams, also capturing the National League title in 1928 with the St. Louis Cardinals. His 1,892 career victories ranked fourth in major league history when he ended his managing career in 1946, and trailed only John McGraw's NL total of 2,669 in league history. He was nicknamed "Deacon" because he sang in his church choir and generally lived a quiet life.

== Early life ==
McKechnie was born on August 7, 1886, to Archibald and Mary McKechnie, two Scottish immigrants who had settled in Wilkinsburg, Pennsylvania, shortly before Bill was born.

== Playing career ==
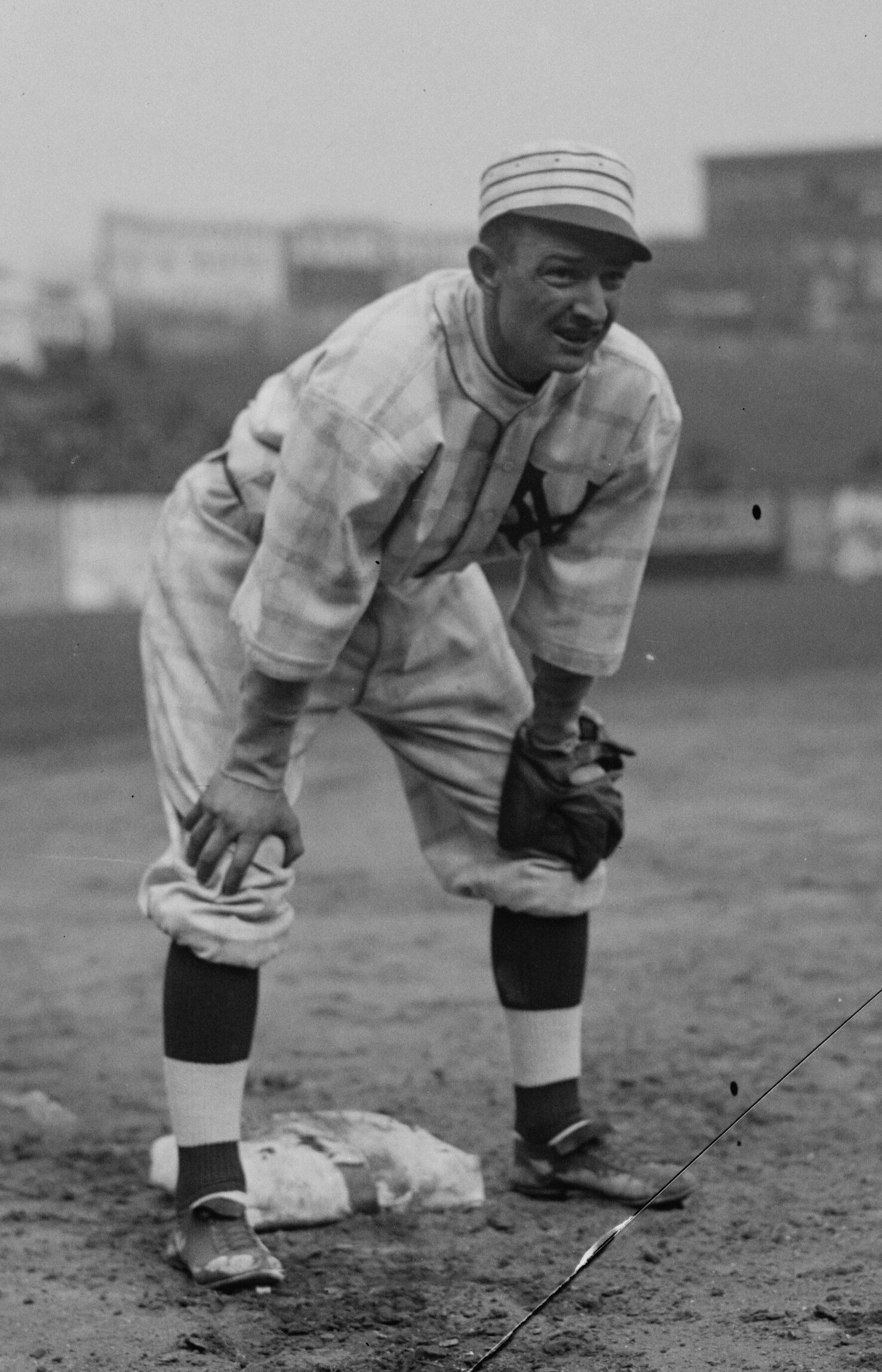
McKechnie in 1916

McKechnie made his major league debut in 1907 with the Pittsburgh Pirates, appearing in three games, before reemerging with the team in 1910 in a more substantial role. A utility infielder for the first half of his career before playing more substantially at third base later on, McKechnie played with the Pirates (1907, 1910–1912, 1918, 1920), Boston Braves (1913), New York Yankees (1913), Indianapolis Hoosiers/Newark Peppers (1914–15), New York Giants (1916) and Cincinnati Reds (1916–17). His best offensive season came in 1914 with the Hoosiers, when he scored 107 runs, batted .304 and stole 47 bases.

In 846 games over 11 major league seasons, McKechnie posted a .251 batting average (713-for-2843) with 319 runs, 8 home runs, 240 RBI, 127 stolen bases and 190 bases on balls. Defensively, he recorded an overall .954 fielding percentage playing at third, second, first base and shortstop.

== Managing career ==
=== Newark Peppers ===
In 1913, McKechnie had his worst season as a full-time player, batting only .134. However, Yankees manager Frank Chance thought McKechnie had a keen baseball mind, and had him sit next to him on the bench during games. Two years later, McKechnie got his first taste of managerial duties, when he served as player-manager of the Newark Peppers of the Federal League, leading the team to a 54–45 record.

=== Post–playing career ===
After he retired as a player, he managed for a year in the minors before assuming the helm of the Pirates in 1922. He managed the Pirates from 1922 to 1926, St. Louis Cardinals in 1928, St. Louis Cardinals again after they rehired him in 1929, Boston Braves from 1930 to 1937, and Cincinnati Reds from 1938 to 1946. He compiled 1,896 wins and 1,723 losses for a .524 winning percentage over his managerial career. His teams won four National League pennants (1925, 1928, 1939 and 1940) and two World Series championships (1925 and 1940), and he remains the only manager to win National League pennants with three teams (Pittsburgh, St. Louis and Cincinnati).

=== Pittsburgh Pirates ===
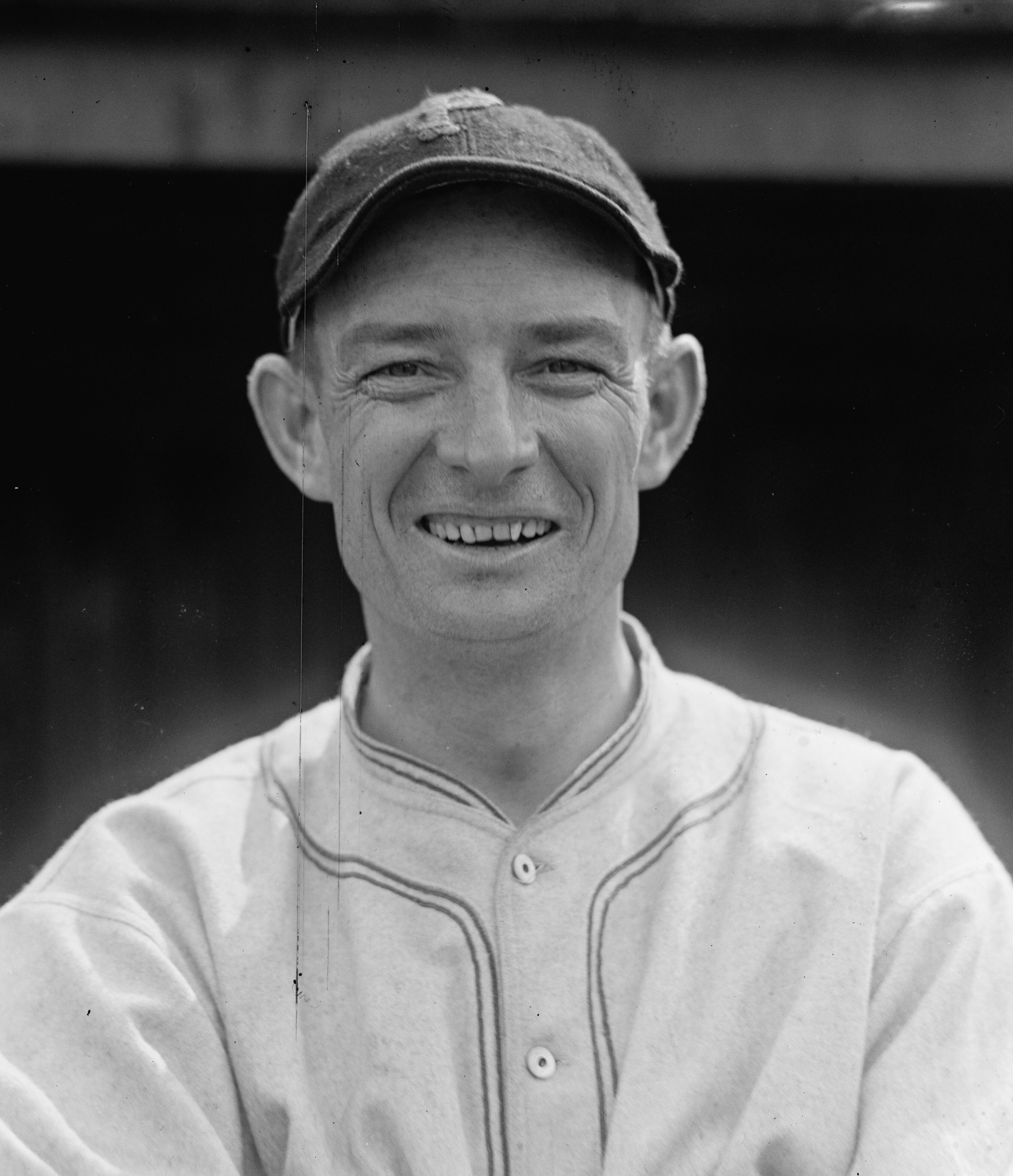
McKechnie as the manager of the Pittsburgh Pirates in 1925.

He took over the Pirates in the middle of the 1922 season, as George Gibson was fired after going 32–33. McKechnie led the Pirates to 53 wins in 90 games to maneuver them into a third-place finish in the National League. Third place awaited the Pirates for the next two years, but the 1925 season proved a breakthrough as the Pirates went 95–58 and won the pennant, which was the first pennant for the club in sixteen years, led by future Hall of Famers such as Max Carey, Kiki Cuyler, and Pie Traynor. Pittsburgh faced off against the Washington Senators, who had won the World Series the previous year while brought on fellow Hall of Famers in manager Bucky Harris, Stan Coveleski, Goose Goslin, Sam Rice, and Walter Johnson. The Pirates won just one of the first four games, needing to win to drive the Series back to Pittsburgh. They held the Senators (who had scored fourteen runs in the past four games to seven for Pittsburgh) to five total runs in the next two games to force a Game 7 with Johnson on the mound against Ray Kremer. Amid rain and fog in Forbes Field, the Senators built an early lead with four runs in the first inning. However, the Pirates responded each time Washington would score, and this included a 7–6 game going into the bottom of the eighth inning. Two outs were followed by three hits, a fielder's choice, and a walk; Cuyler hit a two-run double off Johnson for the go-ahead runs as Red Oldham got the save to clinch Pittsburgh's title. It would be the last World Series title for the Pirates for 35 years.

McKechnie's tenure in Pittsburgh unraveled the following year when several of his players thought part-owner, vice president and de facto bench coach Fred Clarke was undermining him. Several of them thought Clarke was trying to regain the job he had held from 1900 to 1915. Three veteran players—Max Carey, Carson Bigbee and Babe Adams—demanded Clarke's removal from the bench. McKechnie, who by inclination was a player's manager, initially appeared to support them. However, fearing that he'd be seen as opposing the ownership, he was forced to denounce his own players. Ownership struck fast and hard, releasing Bigbee and Adams and waiving Carey. The dispute cut the legs out from under the Pirates, who fell to third with a 84–69 (with four ties) record. McKechnie was fired after the season. He was replaced by Donie Bush, who had short-term success with the Pirates, including winning the pennant in his first season with the club, although his squabbles with Cuyler lead to a subsequent trade and Bush's resignation two years later.

=== St. Louis Cardinals ===
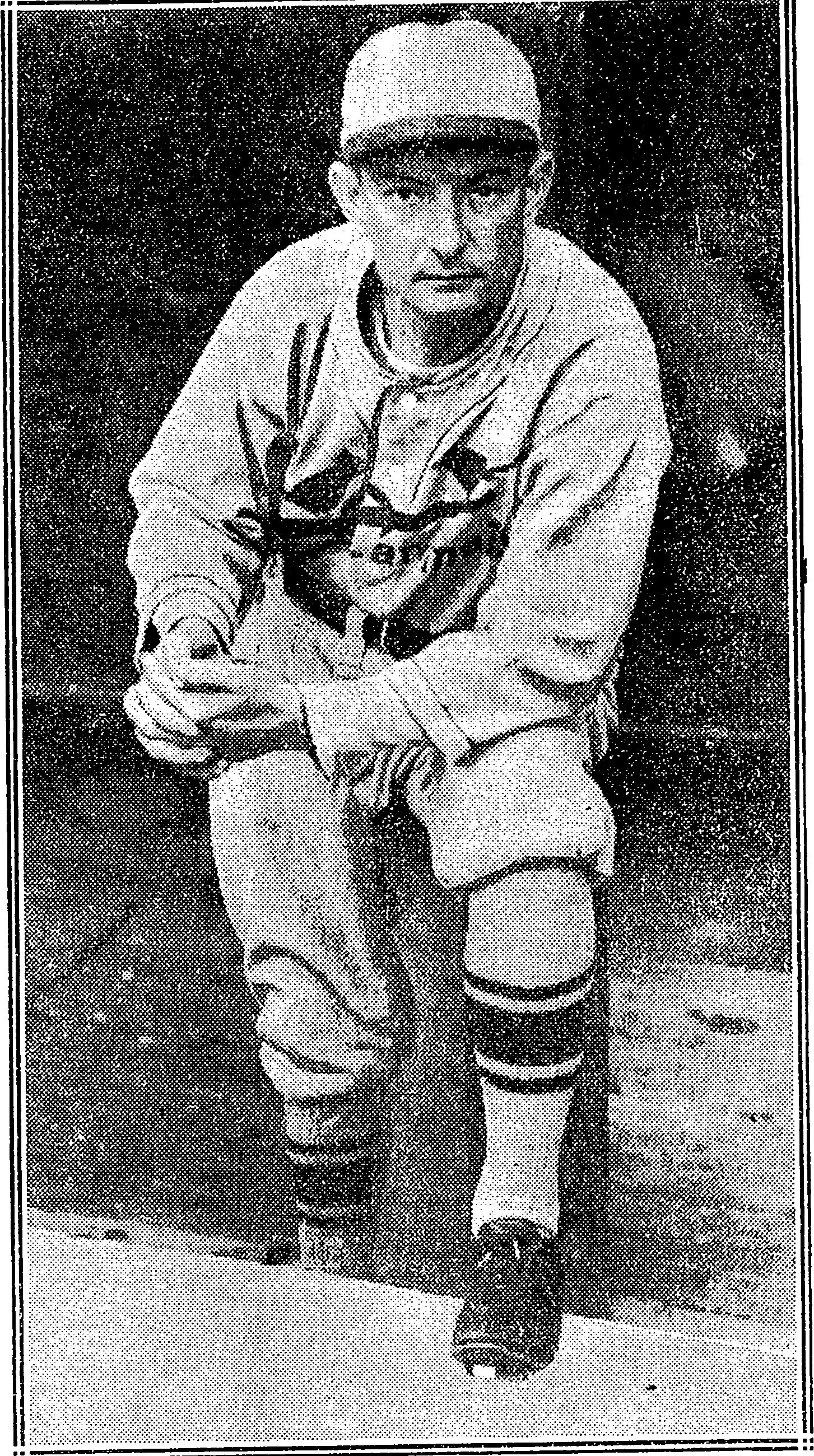
McKechnie as Cardinals manager in 1928

McKechnie was brought in as a coach for the 1927 season for the St. Louis Cardinals. After the year ended, he replaced player-manager Bob O'Farrell, who was given a $5,000 raise to step down for McKechnie. The Cardinals finished the 1928 season in first place with a record 95 wins and 59 losses. They were swept in the World Series by the New York Yankees. McKechnie left the club after the World Series. Billy Southworth started the 1929 season with 43 wins and 45 losses. Gabby Street managed for a game before McKechnie returned as manager. He finished the 1929 season with a record of 34 wins and 29 losses.

=== Boston Braves ===
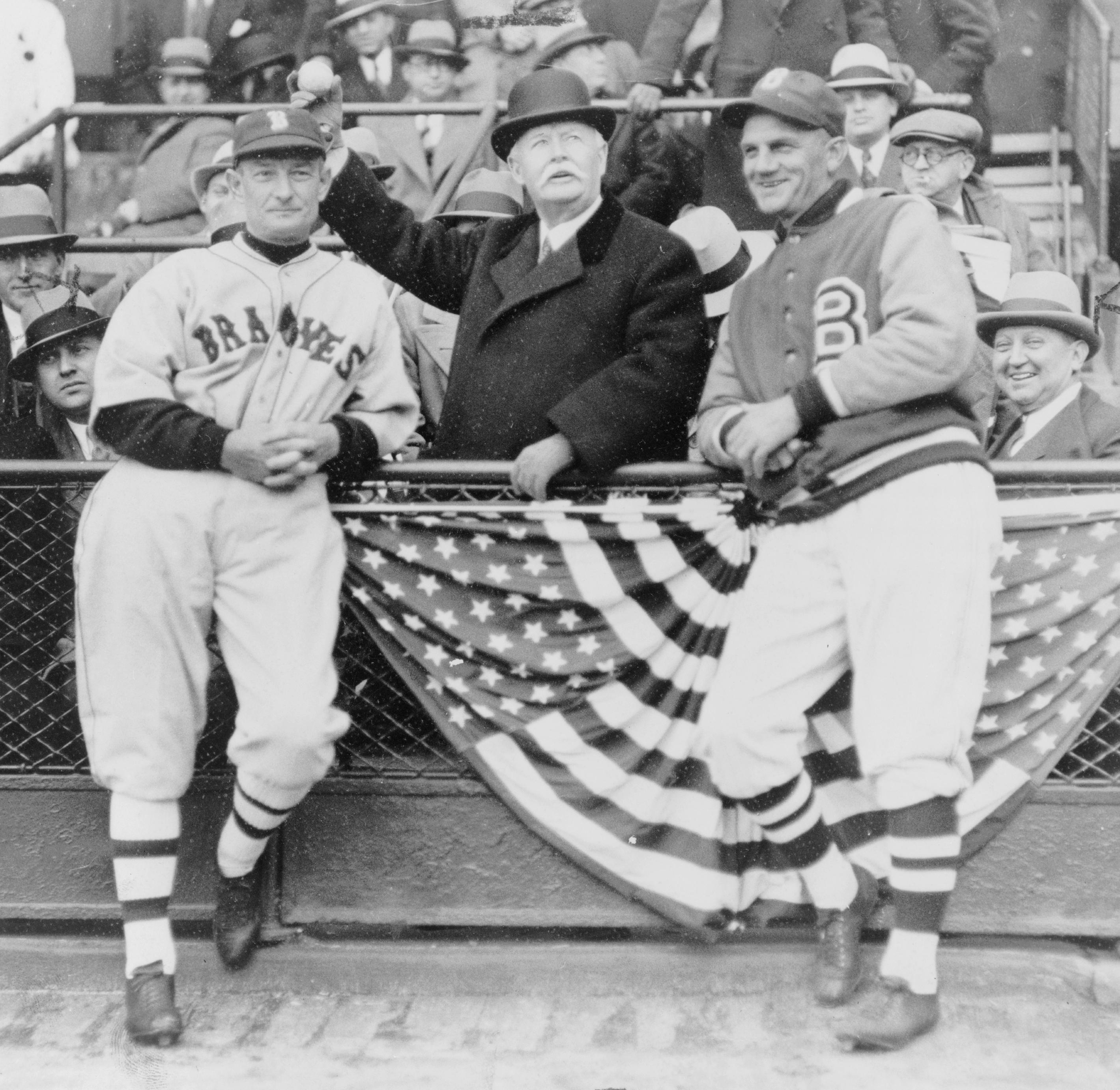
McKechnie (left), and the Dodgers' Max Carey watch as John H. McCooey throws out the first ball of Brooklyn's 1932 season

McKechnie was hired to manage the Boston Braves in 1930, replacing Emil Fuchs, who had added manager to his title of owner when he had to trade Rogers Hornsby to try to stay solvent. Financial troubles would plague the Braves alongside other teams in the Great Depression era. His first Braves team finished 70–84 for a sixth-place finish in the NL, which was actually an improvement from their record of 56–98 the previous year. McKechnie was not nearly as successful in Boston as he was at his other managerial stops, but he managed to finish "fourth or fifth with teams that should have been eighth," according to baseball historian Lee Allen. In eight years, he had a winning record four times while finishing in the first division (top four) twice.

In 1933, they finished 83–71 to have their first winning season in twelve years, doing so while finishing fourth, nine games behind New York. They finished 78–73 the next year and finished 16 games behind St. Louis for another fourth-place finish. The bottom fell out in 1935, a season in which Babe Ruth returned to play in the city of Boston for the first time in 16 years, with Fuchs also giving him duties of vice president and assistant manager, although these were more ceremonial than anything. According to Allen, McKechnie claimed that Ruth's presence made it nearly impossible to enforce discipline. Ruth drew a huge salary, and lived apart from the team on the road. Additionally, years of high living had rendered him a shadow of his former self. He could no longer run, and committed so many errors that three pitchers threatened to go on strike if he was in the lineup. Ruth stopped hitting as well, and retired only a month into the season after hitting .181. Despite fielding essentially the same team that finished fourth a year earlier, the Braves crumbled to a record of 38–115, the worst record in modern National League history and the second worst in modern major league history. The team improved in the next two years, going 71–83 (with three ties) and 79–73 before McKechnie was hired to manage the Cincinnati Reds in 1938.

=== Cincinnati Reds and later career ===
According to one baseball reference work, McKechnie had a poor sense of direction, which did not improve when, as the Reds' manager, he began traveling by plane. He arrived in an airport when the Reds were to play the Pirates at Forbes Field. He hailed a taxi and asked the driver to take him to the Schenley Hotel. "I never heard of it", said the driver. McKechnie gave him the names of the nearby streets. "Never heard of them either", the cabbie said. "How long have you been driving a cab here? the manager asked. "Twenty-five years and then some", said the driver, "But so help me I never heard of the Schenley Hotel! You must be in the wrong town! Where do you think you are?" "Pittsburgh", McKechnie said. "Pittsburgh, hell!" retorted the driver. "You're really lost. This is Detroit!"

McKechnie was an unusual kind of manager for his era. A very religious man, he did not smoke, drink alcohol or use profanity. When he had a problem player who was likely to go out carousing, McKechnie's simple solution was to room with him.

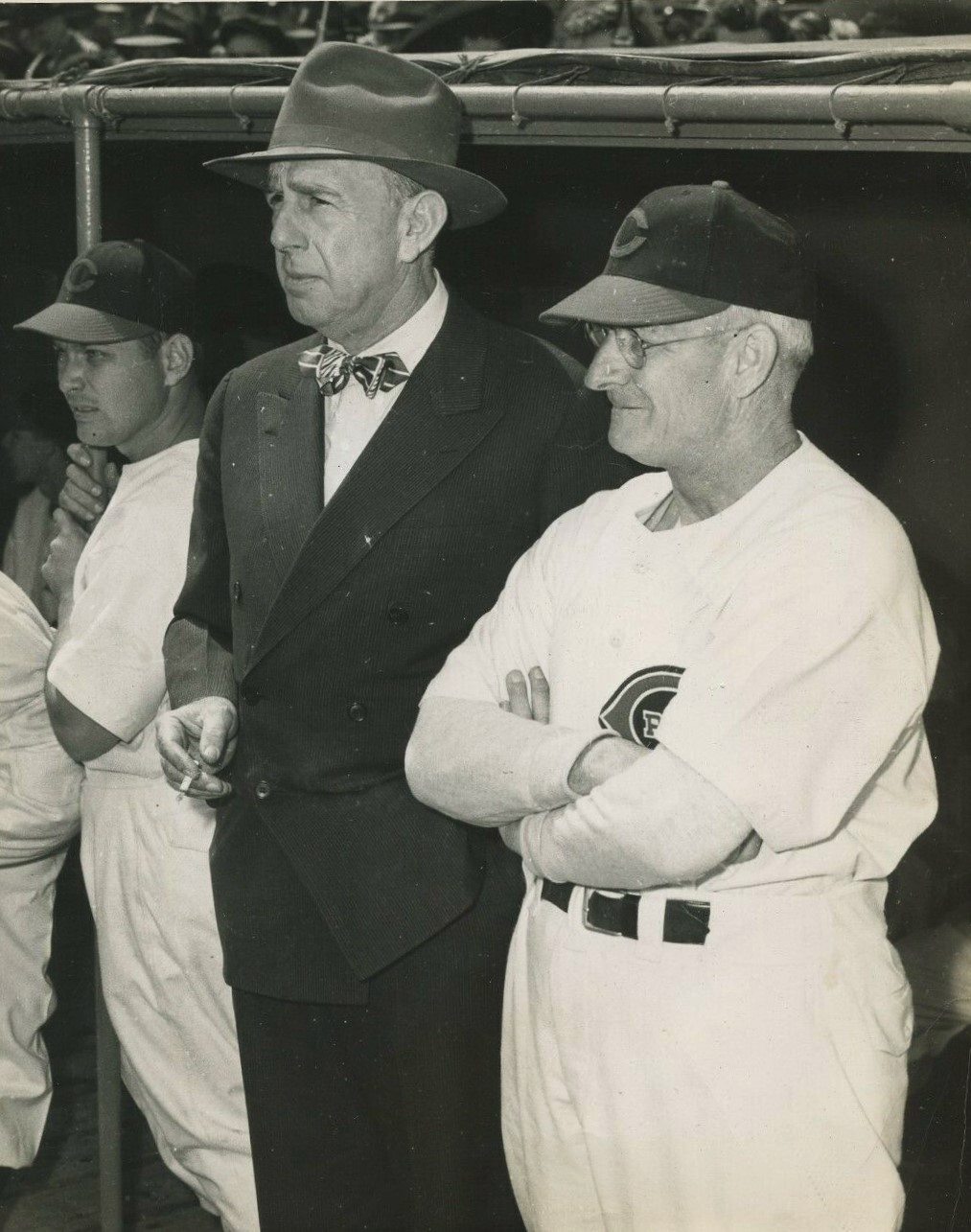
McKechnie (right) standing next to Cincinnati Reds owner Powel Crosley Jr. (center), circa 1940.

In his first season with the Reds, he led them to an 82–68–1 record, finishing 4th in the NL behind the Chicago Cubs. In his second year, he led them to a 97–57–2 record, finishing 1st by 4 1/2 games over the St. Louis Cardinals. This was McKechnie's third pennant, with each occurring with a different team. In the World Series that year, they were swept by the New York Yankees. In the following year, the Reds managed to improve, winning 100 games (a team first) while winning the NL once again, this time by 12 games over the Brooklyn Dodgers. In the World Series that year, they beat the Detroit Tigers in seven games. The Reds didn't win more than 90 games in the rest of McKechnie's tenure, but they did manage to finish with a winning record in four of his six final years, including a 2nd place in 1943. 1946 was his final year with the team, managing them to a 64–86 record (with 2 ties), with Hank Gowdy managing the final four games. His last game managed was on September 25 at St. Louis, winning 6–0.

He was hired as a coach to be the right-hand man of young Cleveland Indians manager Lou Boudreau the following year. Once, when Larry Doby (the first African American player in the American League was playing for the Indians, McKechnie prevented him from going up a barrier to confront a racist heckler, saying that it would "ruin you, not him".

The Boudreau–McKechnie Indians won a World Series in 1948. McKechnie coached with Boudreau for five seasons, with the Indians (1947–49) and Boston Red Sox (1952–53).

McKechnie was inducted into the Baseball Hall of Fame in 1962 and into the Cincinnati Reds Hall of Fame in 1967.

=== Managerial record ===
Team	Year	Regular season					Postseason			
Team	Year	Games	Won	Lost	Win %	Finish	Won	Lost	Win %	Result
Newark	1915	102	54	45	.545	5th in Federal	–	–	–	–
Newark total		102	54	45	.545		0	0	.000	
PIT	1922	90	53	36	.596	3rd in NL	–	–	–	–
PIT	1923	154	87	67	.565	3rd in NL	–	–	–	–
PIT	1924	153	90	63	.588	3rd in NL	–	–	–	–
PIT	1925	153	95	58	.621	1st in NL	4	3	.571	Won World Series (WAS)
PIT	1926	157	84	69	.549	3rd in NL	–	–	–	–
PIT total		707	409	293	.583		4	3	.571	
STL	1928	154	95	59	.617	1st in NL	0	4	.000	Lost World Series (NYY)
STL	1929	63	34	29	.540	4th in NL	–	–	–	–
STL total		217	129	88	.594		0	4	.000	
BOB	1930	154	70	84	.455	6th in NL	–	–	–	–
BOB	1931	156	64	90	.416	7th in NL	–	–	–	–
BOB	1932	155	77	77	.500	5th in NL	–	–	–	–
BOB	1933	156	83	71	.539	4th in NL	–	–	–	–
BOB	1934	152	78	73	.517	4th in NL	–	–	–	–
BOB	1935	153	38	115	.248	8th in NL	–	–	–	–
BOB	1936	157	71	83	.461	6th in NL	–	–	–	–
BOB	1937	152	79	73	.520	5th in NL	–	–	–	–
BOB total		1,235	560	666	.457		0	0	–	
CIN	1938	151	82	68	.547	4th in NL	–	–	–	–
CIN	1939	156	97	57	.630	1st in NL	0	4	.000	Lost World Series (NYY)
CIN	1940	155	100	53	.654	1st in NL	4	3	.571	Won World Series (DET)
CIN	1941	154	88	66	.571	3rd in NL	–	–	–	–
CIN	1942	154	76	76	.500	4th in NL	–	–	–	–
CIN	1943	155	87	67	.565	2nd in NL	–	–	–	–
CIN	1944	155	89	65	.578	3rd in NL	–	–	–	–
CIN	1945	154	61	93	.396	7th in NL	–	–	–	–
CIN	1946	152	64	86	.427	(resigned)	–	–	–	–
CIN total		1,386	744	631	.541		4	7	.364	
FL/MLB Total		3,647	1,896	1,723	.524		8	14	.364	

== Personal life ==
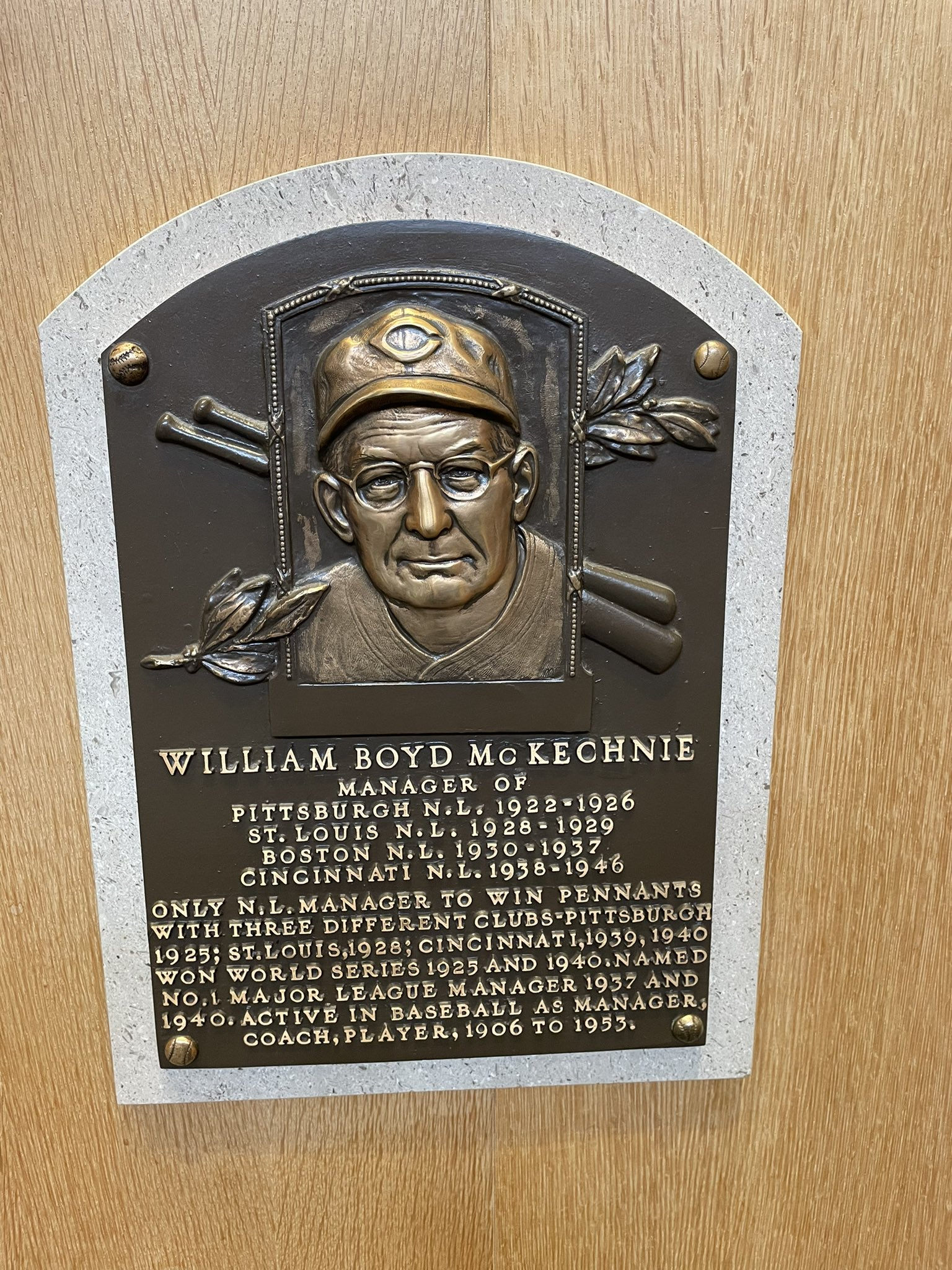
McKechnie's plaque at the Baseball Hall of Fame

McKechnie died at age 79 in Bradenton, Florida.

The Pirates' spring training home, McKechnie Field in Bradenton, was named after him until the name changed to LECOM Park in 2017.

McKechnie's son Bill Jr. was the farm system director of the Cincinnati Redlegs in the mid-1950s and later served as president of the Florida State League (1961–1962) and Pacific Coast League (1969–1973). He was also the father of former Syracuse radio station WNDR sportscaster Jim McKechnie. Bill McKechnie Jr.'s son Bill III was born April 20, 1940, and died of cancer in Florida on June 17, 2006.

== See also ==
- List of Major League Baseball player-managers
- List of Major League Baseball managers with most career wins
- List of St. Louis Cardinals coaches

== Notes ==
Sporting positions
Preceded by Frank Shellenback	Boston Red Sox Pitching Coach; 1952–1953	Succeeded by Joe Dobson
