= Benny Kauff =

American baseball player (1890–1961)

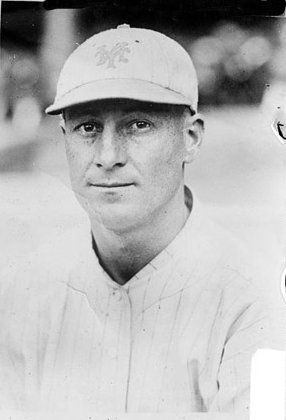
- Kauff in 1917
- Outfielder
- Born: January 5, 1890; Pomeroy, Ohio, U.S.
- Died: November 17, 1961 (aged 71); Columbus, Ohio, U.S.
- Batted: Left Threw: Left

MLB debut
- April 20, 1912, for the New York Highlanders

Last MLB appearance
- July 2, 1920, for the New York Giants

MLB statistics
- Batting average: .311
- Home runs: 49
- Runs batted in: 455
- Stats at Baseball Reference

Teams
- New York Highlanders (1912); Indianapolis Hoosiers (1914); Brooklyn Tip-Tops (1915); New York Giants (1916–1920)

Career highlights and awards
- 2× Federal League batting champion (1914, 1915); 2× Federal League stolen base leader (1914, 1915)

Bennie Michael "Benny" Kauff (/kaʊf/ KOWF; January 5, 1890 – November 17, 1961) was an American professional baseball player, who played center field and batted and threw left-handed. Kauff was known as the "Ty Cobb of the Feds." Kauff was banned from baseball in 1921 amid charges of auto theft; despite his acquittal, baseball commissioner Kenesaw Mountain Landis refused to overturn the ban. Kauff would not be reinstated until 2025, when Rob Manfred announced all bans that continued after death were eliminated.

== Baseball career ==
=== Early career (1912–1915) ===
Kauff played his first game in the majors with the New York Highlanders on April 20, 1912. He played only five games with the Highlanders, playing the rest of the year in the minors.

After spending the 1913 season in the minors, he appeared with the Indianapolis Hoosiers of the short-lived third major league, the Federal League. Indianapolis rode his league-leading bat to the first league crown in 1914, but traded him to the Brooklyn Tip-Tops before the 1915 season. The Tip-Tops, unable to capitalize on Kauff's hitting, finished seventh in the Federal League's second, and last, season.

Kauff was called "Ty Cobb of the Feds" for his dominant hitting during both years of the Federal League's existence. In 1914, he led the league in batting average (.370; still the rookie record for league-leading batting average), on-base percentage (.447), runs (120), hits (211), total bases (305), doubles (44) and stolen bases (75), while finishing 2nd in slugging percentage (.534) and 3rd in runs batted in (95) and walks (72).

He followed with an almost equally impressive season in 1915. That year he led the Federal League in batting average (.342), on-base percentage (.446), slugging percentage (.509) and steals (55) while finishing 2nd in walks (85), 3rd in home runs (12) and 4th in runs batted in (83), runs (92) and hits (165).

=== New York Giants (1916–1920) ===
When the Federal League folded after just two seasons, the National League New York Giants purchased his contract from Brooklyn for $35,000 ($1,011,000 today). Kauff was a Giant from 1916 to 1920, winning the pennant in 1917, but never regained his Federal League hitting prowess.

On May 26, 1916, he earned the dubious distinction of being the only player in the 20th century to be picked off first base three times in one game.

But also in his first year as a Giant, he was 2nd in the NL in stolen bases (40) and triples (16), 4th in runs batted in (74), home runs (9) and walks (68), and 9th in slugging percentage (.408).

His best season in the National League was 1917, when he was 3rd in runs (89) and stolen bases (30), 4th in batting average (.308), 5th in on-base percentage (.479), 6th in hits (172), and 7th in runs batted in (68) and walks (59). That year, the Giants made it to the World Series, but lost to the Chicago White Sox 4 games to 2, in Chicago's last World Series victory until 2005. Kauff's two-homer game was the only one achieved by a National League player in the World Series until Bob Elliott of the Boston Braves did it in 1948. His best Series performance was in Game 4, with two home runs and three runs batted in during the Giants' 5–0 victory.

His 1918 campaign was shortened by service in World War I.

In 1919, he led the NL in extra-base hits (44) and was 2nd in home runs (10), 4th in runs batted in (67) and doubles (27), 5th in runs (73) and 7th in slugging percentage (.422).

In December of that year, however, Kauff and his brother were implicated in a car theft. According to the criminal complaint, Kauff and two of his employees, James Shields and James Whalen, sold a car to Ignatz Engel after stealing it and giving it a new paint job. Kauff adamantly denied the charges, claiming he did not know the car was stolen. He claimed that Shields and Whalen had given him what turned out to be a false bill of sale, thus leading him to believe the car had been acquired legally. After only 55 games in 1920, the Giants traded him to Toronto of the International League.

=== Career statistics ===
In 859 games over eight seasons, Kauff posted a .311 batting average (961 hits in 3094 at bats) with 521 runs, 169 doubles, 57 triples, 49 home runs, 455 runs batted in, 234 stolen bases, 367 bases on balls, a .389 on-base percentage and a .450 slugging percentage. He also recorded a .960 fielding percentage playing at all three outfield positions. In the 1917 World Series, he batted .160 (4-for-25) but hit two home runs with five runs batted in.

=== Acquittal and banishment ===
Kauff was slated to return to the Giants in 1921, but Baseball Commissioner Judge Kenesaw Mountain Landis suspended Kauff until his auto theft case was resolved. The case finally went to trial on May 10, 1921. Kauff argued that he had not only been deceived by his employees, but also presented evidence that showed he had been eating dinner with his wife at the time the car was stolen. The jury acquitted Kauff on May 13 after deliberating for less than an hour.

Nonetheless, Landis refused to reinstate him. In a letter to Kauff, Landis said that even though he was acquitted, the trial revealed serious questions about his character and reputation that would raise questions about baseball's integrity if he were ever allowed to play again. He also told baseball writer Fred Lieb that he personally believed Kauff was guilty, and claimed his acquittal "smelled to high heaven" and was "one of the worst miscarriages of justice that ever came under my observation." According to Kauff's attorney, Emil Fuchs (who would go on to own the Boston Braves), another factor in Landis' refusal to reinstate Kauff was that Kauff tried to compensate Engel for the purchase price of the car after finding out it was stolen—something which Kauff had done on Fuchs' advice. Kauff appealed his banishment in court on the basis of his acquittal, but to no avail. On January 17, 1922, he lost his appeal to a higher court. In his ruling, Justice E. G. Whitaker of the New York State Supreme Court did agree that "an apparent injustice has been done the plaintiff [Kauff]," because "at his time there is no contract between him and the defendant.

Even though banned from playing, he served as a baseball scout for 22 years before becoming a clothing salesman for John R. Lyman Co. He died on November 17, 1961, in Columbus, Ohio.

Kauff was reinstated by Commissioner Rob Manfred on May 13, 2025, along with other deceased players who were on the ineligible list.

== See also ==
- List of Major League Baseball batting champions
- List of Major League Baseball annual doubles leaders
- List of Major League Baseball annual runs scored leaders
- List of Major League Baseball career stolen bases leaders
- List of people banned from Major League Baseball
