= Bill Rariden =

American baseball player (1888–1942)

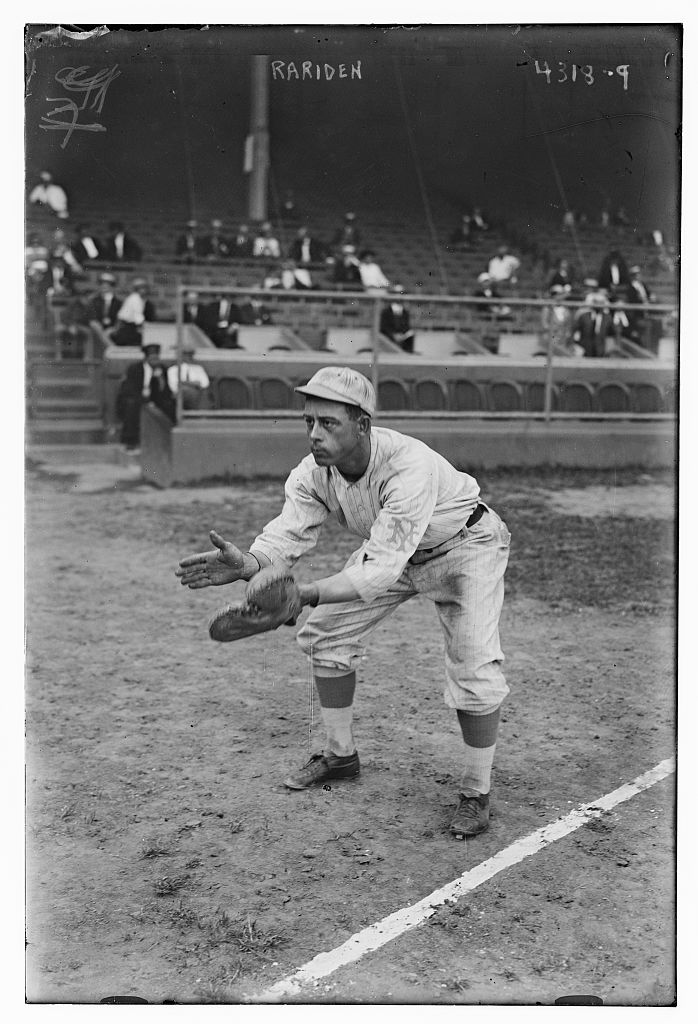
- Catcher
- Born: February 4, 1888; Bedford, Indiana, U.S.
- Died: August 28, 1942 (aged 54); Bedford, Indiana, U.S.
- Batted: Right Threw: Right

MLB debut
- August 9, 1909, for the Boston Doves

Last MLB appearance
- October 2, 1920, for the Cincinnati Reds

MLB statistics
- Batting average: .237
- Home runs: 7
- Runs batted in: 275
- Stats at Baseball Reference

Teams
- Boston Doves / Rustlers / Braves (1909–1913); Indianapolis Hoosiers (1914); Newark Pepper (1915); New York Giants (1916–1918); Cincinnati Reds (1919–1920)

Career highlights and awards
- World Series champion (1919)

William Angel Rariden (February 4, 1888 – August 28, 1942), was an American professional baseball player. He played in Major League Baseball as a catcher from 1909 to 1920 for the Boston Doves/Rustlers/Braves, Indianapolis Hoosiers/Newark Pepper, New York Giants, and Cincinnati Reds.

== Major League career ==
A light-hitting defensive specialist, Rariden set the major league record for most assists by a catcher in a single season with 215 while playing for the Newark Pepper of the Federal League in 1915. He broke his own record the following season when he had 238 in 1915. Major League status was retroactively applied to the Federal League in 1968.

Before Rariden's career, most catchers were large, slow-footed players. Rariden's small size and agility helped him become one of the best catchers in major league baseball. In the Deadball Era during which Rariden played, catchers played a huge defensive role, given the large number of bunts and stolen base attempts, therefore catchers of his era usually accumulated higher assist totals than did those of subsequent eras.

Rariden had his best year offensively with the New York Giants in 1917 when he posted a .271 batting average in 101 games as, the Giants won the National League pennant before being defeated by the Chicago White Sox in the 1917 World Series. Rariden was also a member of the 1919 Cincinnati Reds team which won the scandal-plagued 1919 World Series against the Chicago White Sox.

== Career statistics ==
In a twelve-year major league career, Rariden played in 982 games, accumulating 682 hits in 2,877 at bats for a .237 career batting average along with 7 home runs and 275 runs batted in. He ended his career with a .972 fielding percentage. Rariden led Federal League catchers twice in putouts, twice in assists and twice in baserunners caught stealing. He led National League catchers once in putouts.
