= Newark Peppers =

Federal League baseball team

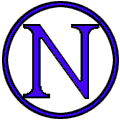
- Logo

Information
- Location: Harrison, New Jersey
- Ballpark: Harrison Park (1915); Federal League Park (1914)
- Founded: 1913
- Disbanded: 1915
- League championships: 1 (1914)
- Former name: Newark Peppers (1915); Indianapolis Hoosiers (1914)
- Former league: Federal League
- Colors: Royal blue, white, red
- Ownership: Harry Ford Sinclair
- Manager: Bill Phillips

The Newark Peppers, originally known as the Indianapolis Hoosiers, were a Federal League baseball team from 1913 to 1915. The Federal League (FL), founded in 1913, was a third major league in 1914 and 1915.

== History ==
The Federal League began as an independent minor league in 1913. The franchise placed in Indianapolis, Indiana, was called the "Hoosier Feds" or just "Hoosiers", and won the 1913 league championship. Their ball field the first season was referred to as Riverside Beach or Riverside Park, and newspapers reported its location as "30th Street and Riverside Park".

When the Federal League declared itself a challenger to the two major leagues in 1914, it retained its franchise in Indianapolis, and built a new facility, Federal League Park. Primarily owned by oil magnate Harry F. Sinclair, the Hoosiers again won the Federal League championship that year with an 88–65 record.

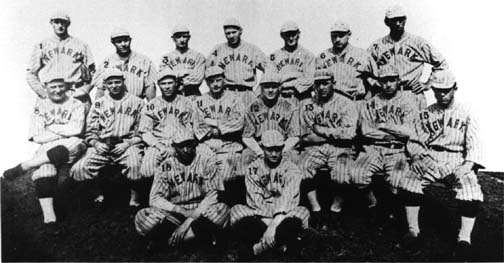
1915 Peppers team

Although the FL had placed a team (the Tip-Tops) in Brooklyn, from the outset Federal League officials felt they could more effectively compete commercially against the American and National leagues by placing a team in Manhattan. All attempts were effectively blocked by principals of the two existing Manhattan teams (the New York Giants and the New York Yankees). Federal League executives decided to relocate the Indianapolis franchise to a major city in the New York metropolitan area, and Newark was chosen. Although the team was named the Newark Peppers (called "The Peps" for short, and initially also "Newfeds"), the team actually played at Harrison Park, in the town of Harrison, New Jersey, across the Passaic River from downtown Newark. (As part of the franchise transfer, Indianapolis outfielder Benny Kauff, who was the Federal League batting champ in 1914, was placed with the Tip-Tops.)

The team finished in 5th place with a won–loss record of 80–72. The Peppers were disbanded when the Federal League went out of business after the 1915 season.

The Peppers were the only major league baseball franchise in New Jersey besides the Elizabeth Resolutes, who played half of the 1873 season in the National Association (the precursor to the National League). The Brooklyn Dodgers played seven "home" games (one against each NL rival) in Jersey City in 1956 and 1957.

Neither Indianapolis or Newark have had a major league baseball team since 1915.

== Notable players ==
The team's roster included future Baseball Hall of Fame members Edd Roush and Bill McKechnie. Other notable major leaguers on the Peppers included pitchers Ed Reulbach and Cy Falkenberg.

Team infielder Rupert Mills "played" the non-existent 1916 "season." A clause in his 1915 contract guaranteed him a salary for the following year as long as he continued to show up at the park, suited and ready to play for the team. Mills fulfilled his contractual obligation, coming to the empty park each day and performing a physical workout to remain in playing condition. Mills, who was born in Newark, was also the only native Jerseyan on the team.

=== Baseball Hall of Famers ===
Newark Peppers Hall of Famers
Affiliation according to the National Baseball Hall of Fame and Museum

Bill McKechnie
Edd Roush

- Players and managers listed in **bold** are depicted on their Hall of Fame plaques wearing a Peppers cap insignia.

== See also ==
- 1914 Indianapolis Hoosiers season
- 1915 Newark Peppers season
