= St. Louis Terriers all-time roster =

List of baseball players

The following is a list of players and who appeared in at least one game for the St. Louis Terriers franchise of the Federal League, which existed from 1914 until 1915.

== Keys ==
Abbreviations
Name	Name of the player by official records
Position	Position that player played in the field
Seasons played	The seasons played for this franchise by the player
†	Elected to the Baseball Hall of Fame
§	Indicates that player was a player-manager
† §	Indicates the player was both a player-manager and Hall of Famer

Position
C	Catcher	1B	First baseman
2B	Second baseman	3B	Third baseman
SS	Shortstop	IF	Infielder
LF	Left fielder	CF	Center fielder
RF	Right fielder	OF	Outfielder
SP	Starting pitcher	RP	Relief pitcher

== List of players ==
Player	Position	Seasons	Notes	Ref
Babe Borton				
Al Boucher				
Al Bridwell				
Mordecai Brown † §				
Harry Chapman				
Pete Compton				
Doc Crandall				
Manuel Cueto				
Dave Davenport				
Charlie Deal				
Delos Drake				
Bob Groom				
Grover Hartley				
Ernie Herbert				
Ernie Johnson				
Fielder Jones §				
Henry Keupper				
La Rue Kirby				
Fred Kommers				
Art Kores				
Armando Marsans				
Joe Mathes				
Hughie Miller				
Ward Miller				
John Misse				
Eddie Plank †				
Mike Simon				
Jack Tobin				
Bobby Vaughn				
Jimmy Walsh				
Doc Watson				
Ted Welch				
Ed Willett				
Tex Wisterzil				
