= 1914 St. Louis Terriers season =

1914 St. Louis Terriers
- League: Federal League
- Ballpark: Handlan's Park
- City: St. Louis, Missouri
- Record: 62–89 (.411)
- League place: 8th
- Owners: Phil Ball
- Managers: Mordecai Brown, Fielder Jones

The 1914 St. Louis Terriers season was a season in American baseball. The Terriers finished in 8th place in the Federal League, 25 games behind the Indianapolis Hoosiers.

== Offseason ==
- Prior to 1914 season: Harry Chapman jumped to the Terriers from the Cincinnati Reds.

== Regular season ==
The 1914 St. Louis Terriers

=== Season standings ===
Federal League
Team	W	L	Pct.	GB	Home	Road
Indianapolis Hoosiers	88	65	.575	—	53‍–‍23	35‍–‍42
Chicago Federals	87	67	.565	1½	43‍–‍34	44‍–‍33
Baltimore Terrapins	84	70	.545	4½	53‍–‍26	31‍–‍44
Buffalo Buffeds	80	71	.530	7	47‍–‍29	33‍–‍42
Brooklyn Tip-Tops	77	77	.500	11½	47‍–‍32	30‍–‍45
Kansas City Packers	67	84	.444	20	37‍–‍36	30‍–‍48
Pittsburgh Rebels	64	86	.427	22½	37‍–‍37	27‍–‍49
St. Louis Terriers	62	89	.411	25	32‍–‍43	30‍–‍46

=== Record vs. opponents ===
1914 Federal League record Sources:
Team	BAL	BKF	BUF	CWH	IND	KC	PRB	SLT
Baltimore	—	9–13	14–8–1	12–10	10–12–1	12–10	10–12–2	17–5–1
Brooklyn	13–9	—	11–11–1	9–13	3–19	11–11–1	17–5–1	13–9
Buffalo	8–14–1	11–11–1	—	10–12–1	11–10	12–10–1	13–7	15–7
Chicago	10–12	13–9	12–10–1	—	13–9–1	14–8	12–10	13–9–1
Indianapolis	12–10–2	19–3	10–11	9–13–1	—	13–9–1	12–10	13–9
Kansas City	10–12	11–11	10–12–1	8–14	9–13–1	—	11–10	8–12
Pittsburgh	12–10–2	5–17	7–13–1	10–12	10–12	10–11	—	10–11–1
St. Louis	5–17–1	9–13	7–15	9–13–1	9–13	12–8	11–10	—

=== Roster ===
1914 St. Louis Terriers
Roster
Pitchers: Mordecai Brown; Dave Davenport; Bob Groom; Ernie Herbert; Henry Keupper; Doc Watson; Ted Welch; Ed Willett	Catchers: Harry Chapman; Grover Hartley; Mike Simon; Infielders: Al Boucher; Al Bridwell; Doc Crandall; Manuel Cueto; Armando Marsans; Joe Mathes; Hughie Miller; John Misse	Outfielders: Delos Drake; La Rue Kirby; Fred Kommers; Ward Miller; Jack Tobin; Other batters: Fielder Jones	Manager: Mordecai Brown; Fielder Jones

== Player stats ==
=== Batting ===
==== Starters by position ====
Note: Pos = Position; G = Games played; AB = At bats; H = Hits; Avg. = Batting average; HR = Home runs; RBI = Runs batted in

Pos	Player	G	AB	H	Avg.	HR	RBI
C	Mike Simon	93	276	57	.207	0	21
1B	Hughie Miller	132	490	109	.222	0	46
2B	Doc Crandall	118	276	86	.309	2	41
SS	Al Bridwell	117	381	90	.236	1	33
3B	Al Boucher	147	516	119	.231	2	49
OF	Delos Drake	138	514	129	.251	3	42
OF	Ward Miller	121	402	118	.294	4	50
OF	Jack Tobin	139	529	143	.270	7	35

==== Other batters ====
Note: G = Games played; AB = At bats; H = Hits; Avg. = Batting average; HR = Home runs; RBI = Runs batted in

Player	G	AB	H	Avg.	HR	RBI
John Misse	99	306	60	.196	0	22
Fred Kommers	76	244	75	.307	3	41
Grover Hartley	86	212	61	.288	1	25
LaRue Kirby	52	195	48	.246	2	18
Harry Chapman	64	181	38	.210	0	14
Joe Mathes	26	85	25	.294	0	6
Manuel Cueto	19	43	4	.093	0	2
Armando Marsans	9	40	14	.350	0	0
Fielder Jones	5	3	1	.333	0	0

=== Pitching ===
==== Starting pitchers ====
Note: G = Games pitched; IP = Innings pitched; W = Wins; L = Losses; ERA = Earned run average; SO = Strikeouts

Player	G	IP	W	L	ERA	SO
Bob Groom	42	280.2	13	20	3.24	167
Dave Davenport	33	215.2	8	13	3.46	142
Doc Crandall	27	196.0	13	9	3.54	84
Mordecai Brown	26	175.0	12	6	3.29	81
Ed Willett	27	175.0	4	17	4.27	73
Doc Watson	9	56.0	3	4	1.93	18

==== Other pitchers ====
Note: G = Games pitched; IP = Innings pitched; W = Wins; L = Losses; ERA = Earned run average; SO = Strikeouts

Player	G	IP	W	L	ERA	SO
Henry Keupper	42	213.0	8	20	4.27	70

==== Relief pitchers ====
Note: G = Games pitched; W = Wins; L = Losses; SV = Saves; ERA = Earned run average; SO = Strikeouts

Player	G	W	L	SV	ERA	SO
Ernie Herbert	18	1	1	1	3.75	24
Ted Welch	3	0	0	0	6.00	2
