= 1915 St. Louis Terriers season =

1915 St. Louis Terriers
- League: Federal League
- Ballpark: Handlan's Park
- City: St. Louis, Missouri
- Record: 87–67 (.565)
- League place: 2nd
- Owners: Phil Ball
- Managers: Fielder Jones

The 1915 St. Louis Terriers finished in 2nd place the Federal League, losing to the Chicago Whales by one percentage point.

== Regular season ==
The 1915 St. Louis Terriers

=== Season standings ===
Federal League
Team	W	L	Pct.	GB	Home	Road
Chicago Whales	86	66	.566	—	44‍–‍32	42‍–‍34
St. Louis Terriers	87	67	.565	—	43‍–‍34	44‍–‍33
Pittsburgh Rebels	86	67	.562	½	45‍–‍31	41‍–‍36
Kansas City Packers	81	72	.529	5½	46‍–‍31	35‍–‍41
Newark Peppers	80	72	.526	6	40‍–‍39	40‍–‍33
Buffalo Blues	74	78	.487	12	37‍–‍40	37‍–‍38
Brooklyn Tip-Tops	70	82	.461	16	34‍–‍40	36‍–‍42
Baltimore Terrapins	47	107	.305	40	24‍–‍51	23‍–‍56

=== Record vs. opponents ===
1915 Federal League record Sources:
Team	BAL	BKF	BUF	CWH	KC	NWK	PRB	SLT
Baltimore	—	7–15	8–14	9–13	4–18	6–16	5–17	8–14
Brooklyn	15–7	—	9–11	7–15	11–11	12–10	9–13	7–15–1
Buffalo	14–8	11–9	—	8–14	11–11	11–11	9–13	10–12–1
Chicago	13–9	15–7	14–8	—	11–11	10–10–1	12–10–1	11–11–1
Kansas City	18–4	11–11	11–11	11–11	—	11–11	8–13	11–11
Newark	16–6	10–12	11–11	10–10–1	11–11	—	12–10–1	10–12–1
Pittsburgh	17–5	13–9	13–9	10–12–1	13–8	10–12–1	—	10–12–1
St. Louis	14–8	15–7–1	12–10–1	11–11–1	11–11	12–10–1	12–10–1	—

=== Roster ===
1915 St. Louis Terriers
Roster
Pitchers: Doc Crandall; Dave Davenport; Bob Groom; Ernie Herbert; Eddie Plank; Doc Watson; Ed Willett	Catchers: Harry Chapman; Grover Hartley; Infielders: Babe Borton; Al Bridwell; Charlie Deal; Ernie Johnson; Art Kores; Hughie Miller; Bobby Vaughn; Jimmy Walsh; Tex Wisterzil	Outfielders: Pete Compton; Delos Drake; Fielder Jones; La Rue Kirby; Armando Marsans; Ward Miller; Jack Tobin	Manager: Fielder Jones

== Player stats ==
=== Batting ===
==== Starters by position ====
Note: Pos = Position; G = Games played; AB = At bats; H = Hits; Avg. = Batting average; HR = Home runs; RBI = Runs batted in

Pos	Player	G	AB	H	Avg.	HR	RBI
C	Grover Hartley	120	394	108	.274	1	50
1B	Babe Borton	159	549	157	.286	3	83
2B	Bobby Vaughn	144	521	146	.280	0	32
SS	Ernie Johnson	152	512	123	.240	7	67
3B	Charlie Deal	65	223	72	.323	1	27
OF	Delos Drake	102	343	91	.265	1	41
OF	Ward Miller	154	536	164	.306	1	63
OF	Jack Tobin	158	625	184	.294	6	51

==== Other batters ====
Note: G = Games played; AB = At bats; H = Hits; Avg. = Batting average; HR = Home runs; RBI = Runs batted in

Player	G	AB	H	Avg.	HR	RBI
Art Kores	60	201	47	.234	1	22
Harry Chapman	62	186	37	.199	1	29
La Rue Kirby	61	178	38	.213	0	16
Al Bridwell	65	175	40	.229	0	9
Armando Marsans	36	124	22	.177	0	6
Jimmy Walsh	17	31	6	.194	0	1
Tex Wisterzil	8	24	5	.208	0	4
Pete Compton	2	8	2	.250	0	3
Hughie Miller	7	6	3	.500	0	3
Fielder Jones	7	6	0	.000	0	0

=== Pitching ===
==== Starting pitchers ====
Note: G = Games pitched; IP = Innings pitched; W = Wins; L = Losses; ERA = Earned run average; SO = Strikeouts

Player	G	IP	W	L	ERA	SO
Dave Davenport	55	392.2	22	18	2.20	229
Doc Crandall	51	312.2	21	15	2.59	117
Eddie Plank	42	268.1	21	11	2.08	147
Bob Groom	37	209.0	11	11	3.27	111

==== Other pitchers ====
Note: G = Games pitched; IP = Innings pitched; W = Wins; L = Losses; ERA = Earned run average; SO = Strikeouts

Player	G	IP	W	L	ERA	SO
Doc Watson	33	135.2	9	9	3.98	45

==== Relief pitchers ====
Note: G = Games pitched; W = Wins; L = Losses; SV = Saves; ERA = Earned run average; SO = Strikeouts

Player	G	W	L	SV	ERA	SO
Ed Willett	17	2	3	2	4.61	19
Ernie Herbert	11	1	0	0	3.38	23
La Rue Kirby	1	0	0	0	5.14	7
