= List of Major League Baseball players who died in wars =

This is a list of Major League Baseball players who died in wars. The player's team refers to the last team the person played for.

== Spanish-American War ==
Name	Age	Year died	Position	Team	Last year played	Service	Notes
Bill Stearns	45	1898	Pitcher and outfielder	Washington Nationals	1875	U. S. Army	Stearns was the first Major League Baseball player to die in a war. He was a member of the Grand Army of the Republic, which means he served in the American Civil War, even though he was only 12 years old at the end of the war. At the age of 45, he volunteered to serve in the Spanish–American War, but became ill during the American landing on Puerto Rico and died at home several months later.

== World War I ==
Name	Age	Year died	Position	Team	Last year played	Service	Notes
Tom Burr	24	1918	Outfielder	New York Yankees	1914	U. S. Army	A pilot, he crashed after a mid-air collision.
Harry Chapman	32	1918	Catcher	St. Louis Browns	1916		Died of influenza-induced pneumonia, a victim of the Spanish flu.
Larry Chappell	28	1918	Outfielder	Boston Braves	1917	U. S. Army	Died of the Spanish flu.
Harry Glenn	28	1918	Catcher	St. Louis Cardinals	1915	U. S. Army	Died of pneumonia.
Eddie Grant	35	1918	Third baseman	New York Giants	1915	U. S. Army	Killed by a shell in the Forest of Argonne while leading a unit searching for the "Lost Battalion".
Newt Halliday	21	1918	First baseman	Pittsburgh Pirates	1916	U. S. Navy	Died of tuberculosis.
Ralph Sharman	23	1918	Outfielder	Philadelphia Athletics	1917	U. S. Army	Drowned while swimming.
Bun Troy	30	1918	Pitcher	Detroit Tigers	1912	U. S. Army	Shot in the chest during the Meuse–Argonne offensive.

== World War II ==
Of the more than 500 major league players who served in the military in World War II, two were killed.

Name	Age	Year died	Position	Team	Last year played	Service	Notes
Elmer Gedeon	27	1944	Outfielder	Washington Senators	1939	U. S. Army	Shot down over France while piloting a Martin B-26 Marauder bomber.
Harry O'Neill	27	1945	Catcher	Philadelphia Athletics	1939	U. S. Marine Corps	Killed by a sniper during the Battle of Iwo Jima.

== Korean War ==
One Major Leaguer was killed in the Korean War.

Name	Age	Year died	Position	Team	Last year played	Service	Notes
Bob Neighbors	34	1952	Shortstop	St. Louis Browns	1939	U. S. Air Force	Piloted a Douglas A-26 Invader light bomber which was hit. The crew bailed out and were initially listed only as missing in action.
