= Ralph Sharman =

American baseball player (1895-1918)

- Outfielder
- Born: April 11, 1895; Cleveland, Ohio, U.S.
- Died: May 24, 1918 (aged 23); Camp Sheridan, Alabama, U.S.
- Batted: Right Threw: Right

MLB debut
- September 10, 1917, for the Philadelphia Athletics

Last MLB appearance
- October 3, 1917, for the Philadelphia Athletics

MLB statistics
- Games played: 13
- At bats: 37
- Hits: 11
- Stats at Baseball Reference

Teams
- Philadelphia Athletics (1917)

Ralph Edward Sharman (April 11, 1895 – May 24, 1918), nicknamed "Bally", was an American baseball outfielder. He played professional baseball from 1915 to 1917, including 13 games in Major League Baseball for the 1917 Philadelphia Athletics. He died in a training accident while serving in the United States Army in 1918 during World War I.

== Career ==
Sharman was born in Cleveland, Ohio, in 1895.

== Professional baseball ==
Sharman was a right-handed batter who began his professional baseball career in 1915, at the age of 20, for the Portsmouth Cobblers of the Class-D Ohio State League. He led the Ohio State League with a .374 batting average in 103 games at Portsmouth.

After the 1915 season, Sharman was drafted by the New York Giants. He began the season with the class-B Galveston Pirates of the Texas League. After playing in 120 games for the Pirates, he was promoted to the class-A Memphis Chickasaws of the Southern Association. He did not hit well for the Chickasaws in 1916, just a .132 batting average in 15 games, and he returned to the Texas League in 1917. He began the 1917 season with the Fort Worth Panthers, then later re-joined the Pirates. In total, he collected 203 hits, three home runs, and had a .341 batting average during the 1917 Texas League season.

In early September 1917, Texas League statistician Karl Bettis wrote:

Fort Worth gets the palm for developing the league's best player during 1917. Ralph Sharman, leading hitter, is the star of the league in all departments of the game. He would strengthen the outfields of several major league clubs right now. This boy is a strong-armed outfielder, equally proficient going back and to the sides for fly balls, and is one sweet right-handed hitter, a commodity much in demand.

Sharman signed with the Philadelphia Athletics toward the end of the 1917 Major League Baseball season. He made his debut with the team on September 10, playing in both games of a doubleheader against the New York Yankees. He appeared in 13 games for the Athletics, batting .297 and collecting 11 hits, two doubles, a triple, two RBIs, a stolen base, and three walks.

== Military and death ==
It was reported on November 3, 1917 that Sharman had enlisted in the United States Army at Cincinnati. With the United States engaged in World War I, he began artillery training on November 5, the following Monday.

Sharman was assigned to Battery F of the 136th Field Artillery stationed at Camp Sheridan in Alabama. He was captain of the camp's baseball team that trained and played several games with the Cincinnati Reds in the spring of 1918.

During a training exercise on May 24, 1918, he drowned in a whirlpool in the Alabama River near the camp. The drowning was witnessed by a number of soldiers, but they were unable to aid him as he was swept away. His body was recovered from the river two days later.

He was buried at Spring Grove Cemetery in Cincinnati.

Sharman was one of eight Major League Baseball players known either to have been killed or died from illness while serving in the armed forces during World War I. The others were Alex Burr‚ Harry Chapman, Larry Chappell‚ Harry Glenn, Eddie Grant‚ Newt Halliday and Bun Troy. Sharman was the only one of the eight to go directly from a major league career into the military; the seven other former MLB players had either been returned to the minor leagues or had retired from baseball at the time they started their service.

== See also ==
- List of baseball players who died during their careers
