= Harry Glenn =

American baseball player (1890–1918)

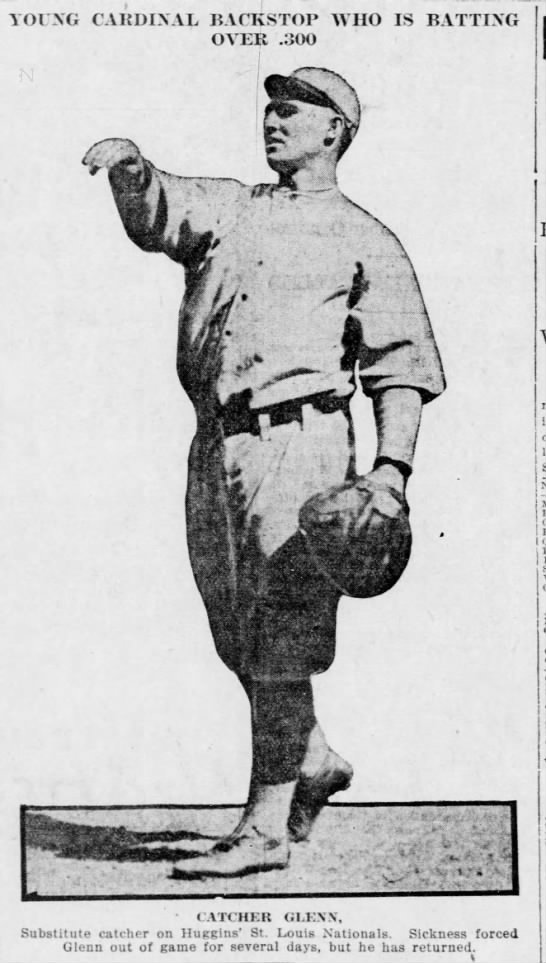
- Catcher
- Born: June 9, 1890; Shelburn, Indiana, U.S.
- Died: October 12, 1918 (aged 28); St. Paul, Minnesota, U.S.
- Batted: Left Threw: Right

MLB debut
- April 14, 1915, for the St. Louis Cardinals

Last MLB appearance
- May 12, 1915, for the St. Louis Cardinals

MLB statistics
- Games played: 6
- At bats: 16
- Hits: 5
- Stats at Baseball Reference

Teams
- St. Louis Cardinals (1915)

Harry Melville "Husky" Glenn (June 9, 1890 – October 12, 1918) was an American professional baseball player from 1910 to 1918. He played a portion of the 1915 season in Major League Baseball as a catcher for the St. Louis Cardinals. He also played eight seasons in the minor leagues including five seasons with the St. Paul Saints from 1914 to 1918.

Glenn was born in Shelburn, Indiana, in 1890. He was drafted to serve in the military in August 1918 during World War I. He served in the U.S. Army Signal Corps where he began training as an aviation mechanic in St. Paul, Minnesota. He developed pneumonia and died in a St. Paul Hospital in October 1918. He is buried in Highland Lawn Cemetery, Terre Haute, Indiana.

Glenn was one of eight Major League Baseball players known either to have been killed or died from illness while serving in the armed forces during World War I. The others were Alex Burr‚ Harry Chapman, Larry Chappell‚ Eddie Grant‚ Newt Halliday, Ralph Sharman and Bun Troy.

== See also ==
- List of baseball players who died during their careers
