= Tom Burr (baseball) =

American baseball player

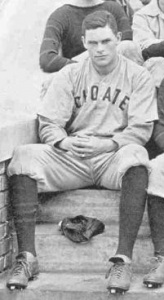
- Outfielder
- Born: November 1, 1893; Chicago, Illinois, U.S.
- Died: October 12, 1918 (aged 24); Cazaux, France
- Batted: Right Threw: Right

MLB debut
- April 21, 1914, for the New York Yankees

Last MLB appearance
- April 21, 1914, for the New York Yankees

MLB statistics
- Games played: 1
- Plate appearances: 0
- Stats at Baseball Reference

Teams
- New York Yankees (1914)

Alexander Thomson Burr (November 1, 1893 – October 12, 1918) was an American professional baseball player who appeared in one inning of one game for the 1914 New York Yankees and was later killed in a military aviation training accident while serving with the U.S. Army Air Service in France during World War I. Born in Chicago, Burr was known as "Tom" to his friends. Press accounts throughout his life, as well as other memoirs, used this nickname, although many baseball references labeled him "Alex".

== Biography ==
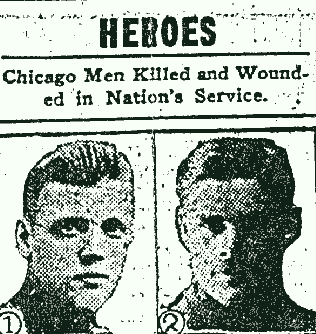
Tom Burr photograph from 1918 newspaper article on his death (Burr on right)

Burr attended The Choate School (later Choate Rosemary Hall), where he was a star pitcher. He then went to Williams College, although he turned professional before he ever played a collegiate game. Burr made the 1914 New York Yankees roster as a pitcher under manager Frank Chance. However, his only appearance for the Yankees came on April 21: playing one inning defensively as the center fielder, he had no fielding chances and did not have a plate appearance. Baseball records show he pitched in seven games for the minor-league Jersey City Skeeters during 1914.

Burr returned to Williams College after his professional career ended, although by some accounts he went into business instead of returning to school. He volunteered to serve in the war before ever graduating. He self-financed his trip to France where he volunteered as an ambulance driver before joining the aviation corps. He was killed shortly before the war ended in an airplane accident on October 12, 1918, while serving in the United States Army Air Service in Cazaux, France. After colliding with a fellow pilot, Burr's plane crashed into a lake in flames; his body was recovered after 12 days. He had been serving in France since November 1917 and was 24 years old at the time of his death.

Burr was interred in American Expeditionary Forces Cemetery No. 29. During the years after the end of World War I, this cemetery was deconsecrated. Some of the bodies exhumed—including Burr's—were repatriated. Burr's final resting place became Rosehill Cemetery and Mausoleum in Chicago.

Burr was one of eight Major League Baseball players known either to have been killed or died from illness while serving in the armed forces during World War I. The others were Harry Chapman, Larry Chappell‚ Harry Glenn, Eddie Grant‚ Newt Halliday, Ralph Sharman and Bun Troy.
