= Larry Chappell =

American baseball player (1890–1918)

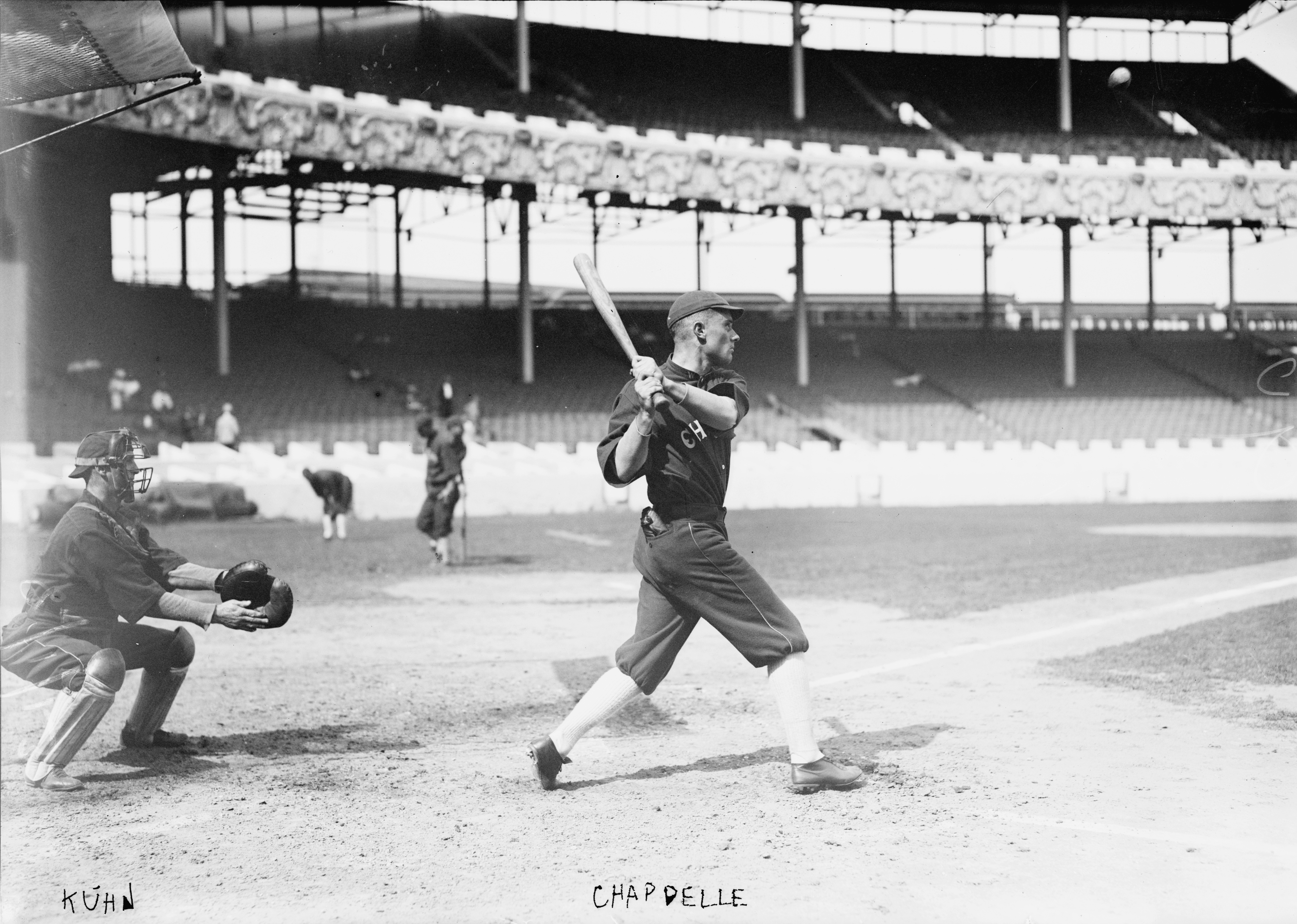
- Chappell (batting) in 1913 with the Chicago White Sox
- Outfielder
- Born: February 19, 1890; McClusky, Illinois, U.S.
- Died: November 8, 1918 (aged 28); San Francisco, California, U.S.
- Batted: Left Threw: Right

MLB debut
- July 18, 1913, for the Chicago White Sox

Last MLB appearance
- April 25, 1917, for the Boston Braves

MLB statistics
- Batting average: .226
- Home runs: 0
- RBI: 26
- Stats at Baseball Reference

Teams
- Chicago White Sox (1913–1915); Cleveland Indians (1916); Boston Braves (1916–1917)

La Verne Ashford "Larry" Chappell (February 19, 1890 – November 8, 1918) was an American professional baseball player who played from 1913 to 1917 for the Chicago White Sox, Cleveland Indians and Boston Braves. Chappell died of Spanish Flu while serving with the U.S. Army Medical Corps during World War I.

== Early life ==
Born in McClusky, Illinois, Chappell played minor league baseball in several cities before making his debut in the major leagues in 1913.

== MLB career ==
His big league career began on July 18, 1913. He hit .231 in 60 games in his rookie season, with no home runs, 15 RBI and seven stolen bases. In 39 at-bats for the White Sox in 1914, he hit .231 again. In 1915, he was hitless in one at-bat.

On February 14, 1916, Chappell was sent to the Indians as the player to be named later to complete a trade that originally occurred August 21, 1915. In all, the Indians received Chappell, Braggo Roth, Ed Klepfer and $31,500. The White Sox received Shoeless Joe Jackson. Chappell was the most expensive of the players sent to the Indians – he was an $18,000 bonus player.

He played in only three games for the Indians, collecting no hits in two at-bats. In May 1916, the Braves purchased him, and in 53 at-bats with them he hit .226. Overall, Chappell hit .218 with nine RBI and two stolen bases in 1916.

Chappell played his final season in 1917, appearing in four games for the Braves, collecting no hits in two at-bats. He played his final game on April 25.

Overall, Chappell hit .226 with no home runs, 26 RBI and nine stolen bases in 109 career games. He walked 25 times and struck out 42 times.

== Death ==
In 1917, Chappell played for the Salt Lake City Bees of the Pacific Coast League. Through 77 games with the Bees, he was having one of his best seasons in professional baseball, hitting .325. In May of that year, newspapers reported that four Bees players – Chappell, Paddy Siglin, Walt Leverenz and Jean Dubuc – were planning to join the U.S. Navy.

Chappell joined the U.S. Army Medical Corps and served at Letterman Army Hospital in San Francisco. He died that November after contracting the Spanish flu at the age of 28. One source holds that he died in an army camp in France, but most sources indicate that he died at Letterman Hospital. He is buried in Oak Grove Cemetery in Jerseyville, Illinois.

Chappell was one of eight Major League Baseball players known either to have been killed or died from illness while serving in the armed forces during World War I. The others were Alex Burr‚ Harry Chapman, Harry Glenn‚ Eddie Grant‚ Newt Halliday, Ralph Sharman and Bun Troy.

== See also ==
- List of baseball players who died during their careers
