= Newt Halliday =

American baseball player (1896–1918)

- First baseman
- Born: June 18, 1896; Chicago, Illinois
- Died: April 6, 1918 (aged 21); Great Lakes, Illinois
- Batted: Right Threw: Right

MLB debut
- August 19, 1916, for the Pittsburgh Pirates

Last MLB appearance
- August 19, 1916, for the Pittsburgh Pirates

MLB statistics
- Games played: 1
- At bats: 1
- Hits: 0
- Stats at Baseball Reference

Teams
- Pittsburgh Pirates (1916)

Newton Schurz Halliday (June 18, 1896 – April 6, 1918) was an American baseball player. He appeared in a portion of one game in Major League Baseball as a first baseman for the Pittsburgh Pirates on August 19, 1916. Halliday had three putouts and an assist in the game and struck out in his only at bat.

Halliday joined the United States Navy after the United States entered World War I. He attended the Great Lakes Naval Training Station, where he contracted tuberculosis, which led to his death at the age of 21.

Halliday was one of eight Major League Baseball players known either to have been killed or died from illness while serving in the armed forces during World War I. The others were Alex Burr‚ Harry Chapman, Larry Chappell‚ Harry Glenn, Eddie Grant‚ Ralph Sharman and Bun Troy.

== See also ==
- List of baseball players who died during their careers
