= Eddie Grant (baseball) =

American baseball player (1883–1918)

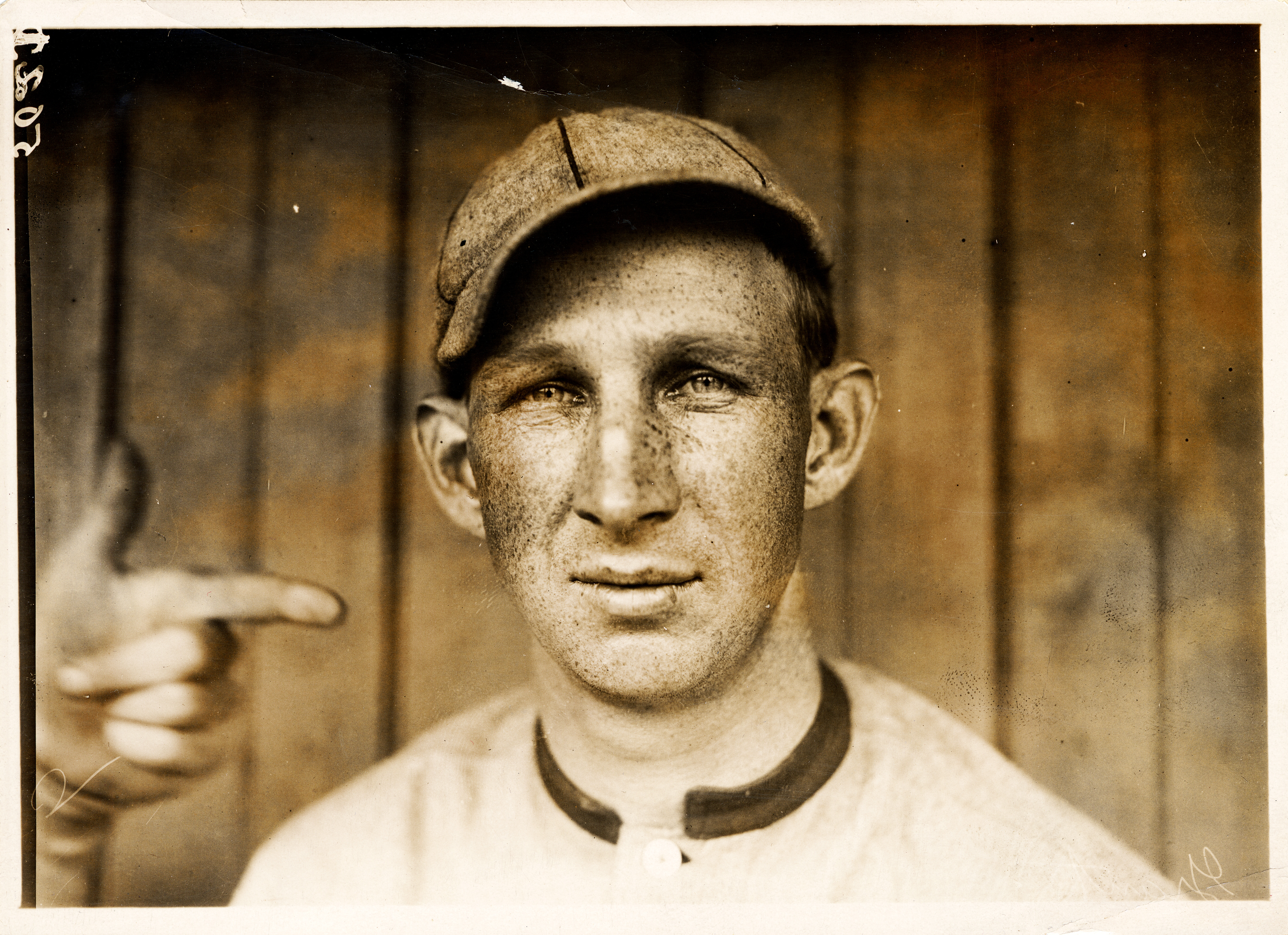
- Third baseman
- Born: May 21, 1883; Franklin, Massachusetts, US
- Died: October 5, 1918 (aged 35); Argonne Forest, France
- Batted: Left Threw: Right

MLB debut
- August 4, 1905, for the Cleveland Naps

Last MLB appearance
- October 6, 1915, for the New York Giants

MLB statistics
- Batting average: .249
- Hits: 844
- RBI: 277
- Stolen bases: 153
- Stats at Baseball Reference

Teams
- Cleveland Naps (1905); Philadelphia Phillies (1907–1910); Cincinnati Reds (1911–1913); New York Giants (1913–1915)
Military career
Allegiance	United States
Branch	U.S. Army
Service years	1917–1918
Rank	Captain
Unit	77th Infantry Division
Conflicts	World War I Meuse-Argonne Offensive
Awards	Purple Heart

Edward Leslie Grant (May 21, 1883 – October 5, 1918), was an American professional baseball player. He played in Major League Baseball as a third baseman between 1905 and 1915. Grant became one of the few major league players to be killed in World War I.

== Biography ==
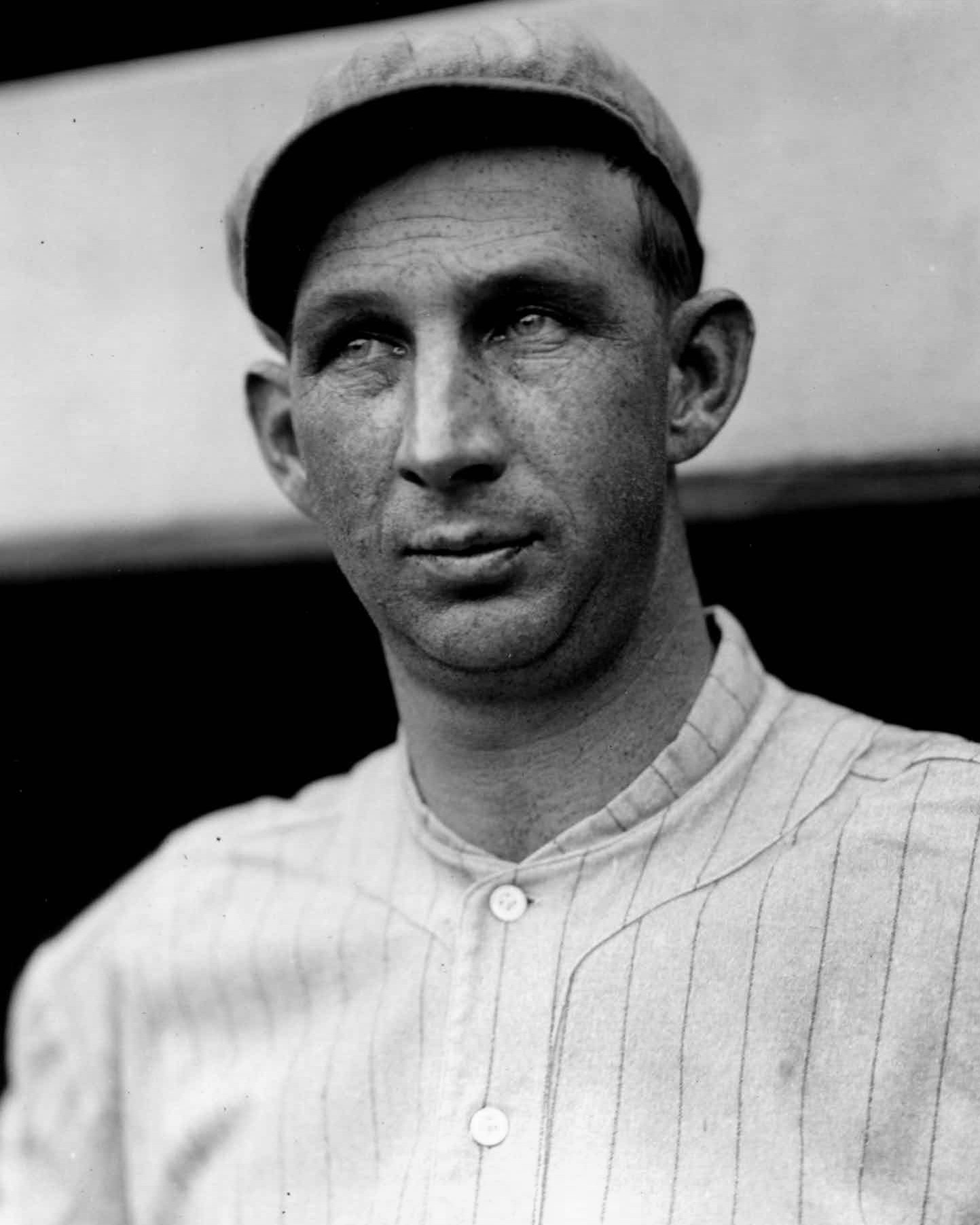
Grant in 1913 as a member of the New York Giants.

Grant was born on May 21, 1883, in Franklin, Massachusetts. After completing high school in 1901, Grant attended Dean Academy (now Dean College) in Franklin for a year before enrolling at Harvard University (earning him the nickname "Harvard Eddie"). While at Harvard, Grant was a member of the freshman basketball and baseball teams. He played varsity basketball for the Crimson during his sophomore year in 1903, and was set to play varsity baseball the following spring until he was declared ineligible for playing in a professional independent baseball league the previous summer. He graduated from Harvard University with an undergraduate degree in 1905 and a law degree in 1909.

Grant entered the majors with the Cleveland Naps at the very end of the 1905 season as an emergency replacement for the ailing second baseman Nap Lajoie. He played in the minor leagues in 1906, but returned to the majors with the Philadelphia Phillies in 1907, and was the Phillies' starting third baseman from 1908–1910. Grant batted leadoff for the Phillies, but was known more for his fielding and base stealing than his batting. His best year was 1910, when he batted .268, drove in 67 runs, and stole 25 bases.

Traded to the Cincinnati Reds in 1911, he batted just .223, his last year as a starter. Grant was traded again to the New York Giants in the middle of the 1913 season, where he finished his career as a utility infielder. Grant appeared in two games of the 1913 World Series, once as a pinch runner and once as a pinch hitter. He retired after the 1915 season. His lifetime batting average was .249.

Perhaps because of his Harvard background, Grant refused to call for a fly ball by yelling, "I got it!" Instead, he would only say what he regarded as the more grammatically correct, "I have it!"

== Post-career ==
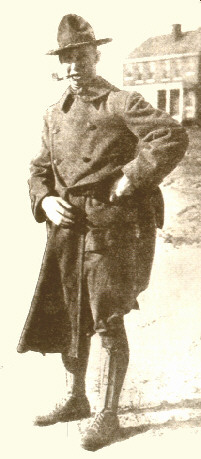
Eddie Grant as a U.S. Army captain during World War I.

Upon his retirement from baseball, Grant opened a law practice in Boston.

Grant was one of the first men to enlist when the United States entered World War I in April 1917, and he served as a captain in the 77th Division of the U.S. Army. During the fierce battle of the Meuse–Argonne offensive, all of Grant's superior officers were killed or wounded, and he took command of his troops on a four-day search for the "Lost Battalion." During the search, an exploding shell killed Grant on October 5, 1918. He was the first Major League Baseball player killed in action in World War I. He was buried at the Meuse-Argonne American Cemetery in Lorraine, France.

Grant was one of eight Major League Baseball players known either to have been killed or died from illness while serving in the armed forces during World War I. The others were Alex Burr‚ Harry Chapman, Larry Chappell‚ Harry Glenn‚ Newt Halliday, Ralph Sharman and Bun Troy.

== Legacy ==
On Memorial Day, May 30, 1921, representatives from the armed forces, baseball, and the sisters of Grant unveiled a monument in center field of the Polo Grounds to his memory. During the celebration at the end of the last Giants' game in 1957, someone pried the plaque from its monument. It was missing for over 40 years until it was claimed to be re-discovered in a Ho-Ho-Kus, New Jersey home that had been owned by a New York City police officer. A replica plaque has been installed at Oracle Park since 2006.

Grant is also memorialized with the Edward L. Grant Highway in The Bronx, New York and by Grant Field at Dean College.

== See also ==
- List of Major League Baseball career stolen bases leaders
