= Bun Troy =

German baseball player (1888–1918)

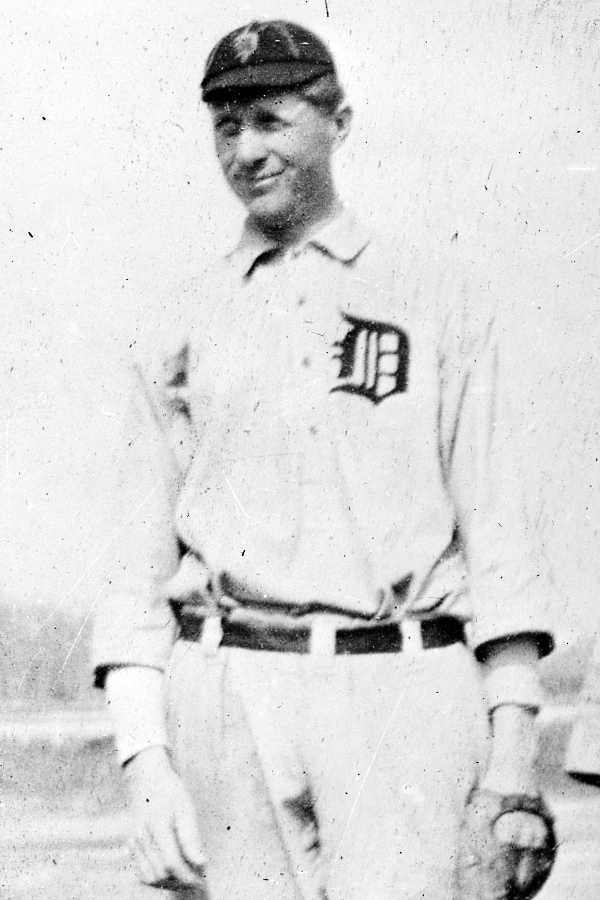
- Pitcher
- Born: August 27, 1888; Bad Wurzach, German Empire
- Died: October 7, 1918 (aged 30) near Verdun, France
- Batted: Right Threw: Right

MLB debut
- September 15, 1912, for the Detroit Tigers

Last MLB appearance
- September 15, 1912, for the Detroit Tigers

MLB statistics
- Win–loss record: 0–1
- Earned run average: 5.40
- Strikeouts: 1
- Stats at Baseball Reference

Teams
- Detroit Tigers (1912)

Robert Gustave "Bun" Troy (August 27, 1888 – October 7, 1918) was a German-born American professional baseball pitcher who was killed in action while fighting against German forces in World War I. Troy was a sergeant with the "Blue Ridge" Division of the United States Army; he was shot in the chest during the Meuse–Argonne offensive.

Before serving in the military, Troy had played five seasons in minor league baseball from 1910 to 1914 and had consecutive 23-win seasons in 1912 and 1913. He pitched one game in Major League Baseball, for the Detroit Tigers against the Washington Senators, on September 15, 1912. Troy pitched six scoreless innings in a pitching duel with Walter Johnson before giving up four runs in the seventh inning.

== Early years ==
Troy was born in Bad Wurzach in southern Germany in 1888. He moved with his family to western Pennsylvania, growing up in McDonald, Pennsylvania.

== Professional baseball career ==
=== Minor leagues ===
In 1909, Troy played for an independent baseball team in his hometown of McDonald, Pennsylvania. He pitched 17 games, lost only two games, and had 187 strikeouts for an average of 11 strikeouts per game. His performance and his size (6 feet, 4 inches, 200 pounds) brought him to the attention of Frank Haller, a scout for the Philadelphia Phillies. He was reportedly signed by the Phillies in September 1909, but did not appear in any games for them.

Troy attended spring training with the Phillies in 1910, but did not make the club. In May 1910, Sporting Life reported that the "elongated twirler" had been signed with the Johnstown Johnnies of the Tri-State League. However, the Sporting Life reported two weeks later on his release and added: "He had the speed and curves, but lacked control, and acted too much like an amateur on the ball field."

After his release by Johnstown, Troy played the remainder of the 1910 season for the McKeesport Tubers of the Ohio–Pennsylvania League. The following year, he played for the Steubenville Stubs in the same league. He compiled a 12–19 record in his two seasons in the Ohio–Pennsylvania League.

Troy garnered considerable acclaim in 1912 when he compiled a 23–14 record for the Adrian Lions of the Southern Michigan League. In late August 1912, the Sporting Life reported that Troy Pitcher had pitched and won a double-header against Kalamazoo, pitching the full nine innings in each game, allowing only three hits in the first game and five hits in the second.

=== Detroit Tigers ===
Troy's performance at Adrian drew the attention of the Detroit Tigers. The Sporting Life described Troy as "a big fellow with lots of steam and a good curve ball" and reported that Detroit's scouts "saw in him a real diamond in the rough." Accordingly, Frank Navin, the owner of the Tigers, gave orders to sign him up immediately. Troy was called up by the Tigers after Adrian's season had ended and appeared in one game, on September 15, 1912. He was the losing pitcher in a 6–3 loss to the Washington Senators. Facing Walter Johnson, Troy held the Senators scoreless through six innings, but gave up four runs in the seventh inning. In all, Troy allowed nine hits, three bases on balls, one hit by pitch, and four earned runs in 6-2/3 innings.

=== Return to the minors ===
Troy returned to the Adrian Lions in 1913. He had another strong year for the Lions, appearing in 43 games and compiling a 23–16 record. In 1914, Troy played for the Pittsfield Electrics in the Eastern Association where he appeared in 36 games and compiled a 19–13 record.

In all, Troy played five seasons of minor league baseball, appeared in 159 games, pitched 914-1/3 innings, and compiled a 77–62 record.

== Military service and death ==
During World War I, Troy served in the 80th Division (nicknamed the "Blue Ridge Division") of the American Expeditionary Forces (AEF). Troy held the rank of sergeant in the 319th Infantry Regiment (Company G), which was made up of men from western Pennsylvania and some from Eastern Ohio. The 80th Division fought at the First Battle of the Somme in March 1918, the Battle of Saint-Mihiel in September 1918, and the Meuse–Argonne offensive which lasted from September 1918 until the end of the war on November 11, 1918. Troy was killed from wounds, reportedly a bullet to the chest, received in combat in the Argonne Forest in October. He died at Evacuation Hospital 8 at Petit Maujouy.

Troy was initially buried in France, but his remains were brought to Monessen, Pennsylvania (where his parents had moved from McDonald), and a military funeral was held there in August 1921. A crowd of 1,000, including members of the 80th Division, packed the First Presbyterian Church and escorted his body on a caisson drawn by four black horses to Robinson's Run Cemetery where a 21-gun salute was fired, taps played, and Troy's remains buried.

Troy was one of eight Major League Baseball players known either to have been killed or died from illness while serving in the armed forces during World War I. The others were Alex Burr‚ Harry Chapman, Larry Chappell‚ Harry Glenn, Eddie Grant‚ Newt Halliday, and Ralph Sharman.
