= Tom Tennant =

American baseball player

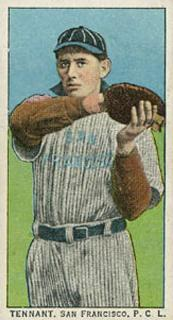
- Pinch hitter
- Born: July 3, 1882; Monroe, Wisconsin, US
- Died: February 15, 1955 (aged 72); San Carlos, California, US
- Batted: Left Threw: Left

MLB debut
- April 18, 1912, for the St. Louis Browns

Last MLB appearance
- April 21, 1912, for the St. Louis Browns

MLB statistics
- Games played: 2
- At bats: 2
- Hits: 0
- Stats at Baseball Reference

Teams
- St. Louis Browns (1912)

Thomas Francis Tennant (July 3, 1882 – February 15, 1955) was an American professional baseball player. In an 11-season minor league career, he had 1,825 hits and a .274 batting average. He also played two games in Major League Baseball in 1912. Tennant was 5 feet, 11 inches tall and weighed 165 pounds.

== Career ==
Tennant was born in Monroe, Wisconsin, in 1882. At some point, his family moved to Elgin, Illinois. Playing mostly as a first baseman, he started his professional baseball career in 1906 with the Wisconsin State League's Green Bay Colts. That season, he batted .313 and led the league with 141 hits. Tennant then moved on to the Illinois–Indiana–Iowa League, where he played for the Decatur Commodores for two seasons. He batted just .261 in 1907 but raised his average to .310 in 1908 and once again topped the circuit in hits, with 164.

Tennant spent 1909 through 1911 with the San Francisco Seals of the class A Pacific Coast League. In 1910, he had 231 hits in 223 games to lead his league in hits for the third time. Then in April 1912, Tennant broke into the major leagues with the St. Louis Browns. He appeared in two games for them that month as a pinch hitter and went 0 for 2 at the plate with 1 run scored. The Browns had used eight first basemen in 1911 but traded for veteran standout George Stovall from the Cleveland Indians in the off-season. A St. Louis newspaper commented that Tennant "had the goods, but he came just one year late to land the regular job". The rest of the 1912 season, he played for the Western League's Sioux City Packers.

In 1913, Tennant returned to the Pacific Coast League, displacing Hughie Miller as the starting first baseman for the Sacramento Solons. He batted .299 with a league-leading 47 doubles in his first year back, but his statistics declined after that. He retired from professional baseball after the 1916 season.

Tennant died in San Carlos, California, in 1955 and was buried in Holy Cross Cemetery.
