= Manuel Cueto =

Cuban baseball player (1892–1942)

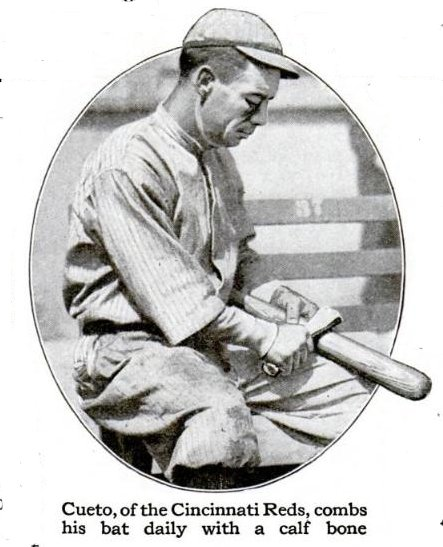
- Outfielder
- Born: February 8, 1892; Guanajay, Cuba
- Died: June 29, 1942 (aged 50); Regla, Cuba
- Batted: Right Threw: Right

MLB debut
- June 15, 1914, for the St. Louis Terriers

Last MLB appearance
- June 25, 1919, for the Cincinnati Reds

MLB statistics
- Batting average: .227
- Home runs: 1
- Runs batted in: 31
- Stats at Baseball Reference

Teams
- St. Louis Terriers (1914); Cincinnati Reds (1917–1919)

Member of the Cuban

Baseball Hall of Fame
- Induction: 1950

Manuel Cueto Melo (February 8, 1892 – June 29, 1942) was a Cuban Major League Baseball player. His professional career lasted from at least 1911, when he played for the Jacksonville Tarpons of the South Atlantic League until 1939, when he played professionally in the Canal Zone League in Panama.

From 1912 to 1933, Cueto played 20 seasons in the Cuban League, batting over .300 11 times. He led the league in batting average twice, in 1918/19 with an average of .344 and in 1926/27 with an average of .398. He ranks tenth all-time in career batting average in the Cuban League, with an average of .301. He was elected to the Cuban Baseball Hall of Fame in 1950.

In the major leagues, Cueto played one season for the St. Louis Terriers of the Federal League in 1914, then three seasons for the Cincinnati Reds from 1917 until 1919. He mostly played in the outfield, but also played at least 10 games at second base, shortstop, third base, and catcher.

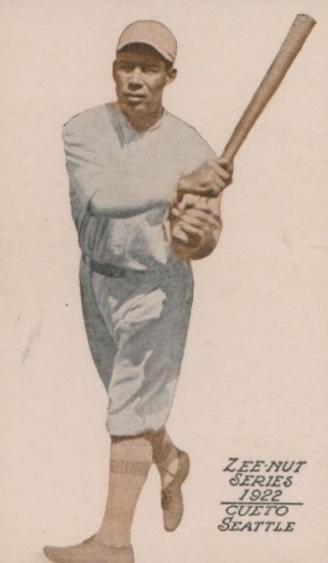
Cueto with the Seattle Indians in 1922
