= Ernie Johnson (shortstop) =

American baseball player (1888–1952)

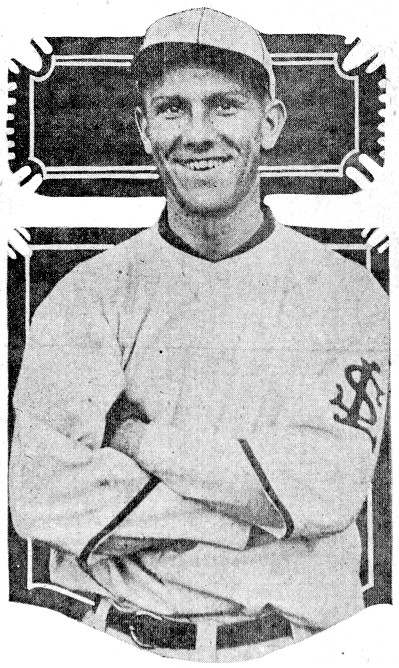
- Shortstop
- Born: April 29, 1888; Chicago, Illinois, U.S.
- Died: May 1, 1952 (aged 64); Monrovia, California, U.S.
- Batted: Left Threw: Right

MLB debut
- August 5, 1912, for the Chicago White Sox

Last MLB appearance
- September 28, 1925, for the New York Yankees

MLB statistics
- Batting average: .266
- Home runs: 19
- Runs batted in: 257
- Stats at Baseball Reference

Teams
- Chicago White Sox (1912); St. Louis Terriers (1915); St. Louis Browns (1916–1918); Chicago White Sox (1921–1923); New York Yankees (1923–1925)

Career highlights and awards
- World Series champion (1923)

Ernest Rudolph Johnson (April 29, 1888 – May 1, 1952) was an American professional baseball shortstop. He played in Major League Baseball (MLB) for the Chicago White Sox (1912, 1921–23), St. Louis Terriers (Federal League 1915), St. Louis Browns (1916–1918), and New York Yankees (1923–1925). In between, he spent 1920 with the Salt Lake City Bees as their player-manager.

Johnson took over the White Sox shortstop job from the recently banned Swede Risberg in 1921. He hit .295 and was fourth in the American League with 22 stolen bases. In 1922 his batting average dropped to .254 and he had the dubious distinction of leading the league in outs (494).

He was acquired by the Yankees via waivers on May 31, 1923, and he batted .447 for them in a limited role. He played in two games of the 1923 World Series against the New York Giants and scored the series-deciding run as a pinch runner in game number six. Johnson spent the next two years with New York in a part-time role, batting .353 and .282. On October 28, 1925, at age 37, Johnson was sent to the St. Paul Saints of the American Association as part of a multi-player trade.

Johnson's career totals for 813 games include 697 hits, 19 home runs, 257 runs batted in, 372 runs scored, a .266 batting average, and a slugging percentage of .350.

After Johnson's playing career, he spent several years as a manager in the minor leagues. He managed the Portland Beavers from 1926 until 1928 and the Seattle Indians from 1929 until 1933. After that, he worked for the Boston Red Sox as an advance scout until his death in 1952 in a Monrovia, California sanatorium.

His son was former major league second baseman Don Johnson. His brother, George, was a long-time minor league umpire.

== Sources ==
- Career statistics from MLB · Baseball Reference · Baseball Reference (Minors) · Retrosheet · Baseball Almanac
