= Joe Mathes =

American baseball player (1891–1978)

- Second baseman
- Born: July 28, 1891; Milwaukee, Wisconsin, U.S.
- Died: December 21, 1978 (aged 87); St. Louis, Missouri, U.S.
- Batted: Both Threw: Right

MLB debut
- September 19, 1912, for the Philadelphia Athletics

Last MLB appearance
- September 9, 1916, for the Boston Braves

MLB statistics
- Batting average: .273
- Home runs: 0
- Runs batted in: 6
- Stats at Baseball Reference

Teams
- Philadelphia Athletics (1912); St. Louis Terriers (1914); Boston Braves (1916)

Joseph John Mathes (July 28, 1891 – December 21, 1978) was an American professional baseball player, manager, and longtime scout. He is perhaps best known as the former chief scout and farm system director of the St. Louis Cardinals of Major League Baseball, for whom he worked across six decades and signed players such as Hall-of-Fame second baseman Red Schoendienst.

== Infielder ==
Mathes was born in Milwaukee, Wisconsin. A switch-hitting infielder during his playing career (1911–1927), Mathes appeared in only 32 games in Major League Baseball, although 26 of those games took place in the Federal League, then considered an "outlaw" circuit, as a member of the 1914 St. Louis Terriers. He also had brief trials with the 1912 Philadelphia Athletics (four games) and 1916 Boston Braves (two appearances) of the "official" major leagues. After only two hits in 14 at bats for Philadelphia, he collected the remainder of his 27 career safeties, including three doubles, with the Terriers to bat .273 lifetime (27-for-99) as a big leaguer.

== Manager, scout and farm system director ==
The rest of Mathes' playing career and his entire tenure as a manager occurred in the minor leagues. After appearing for nine teams in his first eight seasons, he joined Beaumont of the Texas League in 1919, where, in mid-season, he became his club's player–manager. In 1926, he was named skipper of the Houston Buffaloes and entered the Cardinals' organization, where Branch Rickey was constructing the first modern farm system. He switched to scouting in 1928, and became one of Rickey's top talent evaluators at tryout camps the team conducted for young players throughout the United States.

By 1942, when Rickey departed St. Louis to take over the front office of the Brooklyn Dodgers, Mathes had become the Cardinals' chief scout and was part of owner Sam Breadon's "brain trust" in the upper echelons of the Redbirds' front office; by the late 1940s, Mathes had also been given farm system director duties. He remained chief scout as late as 1955 and, although Walter Shannon and Eddie Stanky succeeded to the Cardinals' scouting and farm system director posts by the late 1950s, annual guides published by The Sporting News still listed Mathes among St. Louis's area scouts as late as 1972. He also would work for the Detroit Tigers and Chicago Cubs.

Joe Mathes succumbed to a stroke at age 87 in St. Louis on December 21, 1978.
