= Al Boucher =

American baseball player (1881-1974)

- Third baseman
- Born: November 13, 1881; Franklin, Massachusetts, U.S.
- Died: June 23, 1974 (aged 92); Torrance, California, U.S.
- Batted: Right Threw: Right

MLB debut
- April 16, 1914, for the St. Louis Terriers

Last MLB appearance
- October 8, 1914, for the St. Louis Terriers

MLB statistics
- Batting average: .213
- Home runs: 2
- Runs batted in: 49
- Stats at Baseball Reference

Teams
- St. Louis Terriers (1914)

Alexander Francis Boucher (November 13, 1881 – July 23, 1974), nicknamed "Bo", was an American Major League Baseball third baseman who played for the St. Louis Terriers of the Federal League in 1914.

Boucher died on July 23, 1974. He was interred at Holy Cross Cemetery in Culver City, California.
