= Ted Welch =

American baseball player

- Pitcher
- Born: October 17, 1892; Coyville, Kansas, US
- Died: January 6, 1943 (aged 50); Great Bend, Kansas, US
- Batted: Left Threw: Right

MLB debut
- May 15, 1914, for the St. Louis Terriers

Last MLB appearance
- June 25, 1914, for the St. Louis Terriers

MLB statistics
- Win–loss record: 0-0
- Strikeouts: 2
- Earned run average: 6.00
- Stats at Baseball Reference

Teams
- St. Louis Terriers (1914)

Floyd John "Ted" Welch (October 17, 1892 – January 6, 1943) was a Major League Baseball pitcher, who appeared in three games as a relief pitcher for the St. Louis Terriers of the Federal League in 1914.
