= Henry Keupper =

American baseball player (1887–1960)

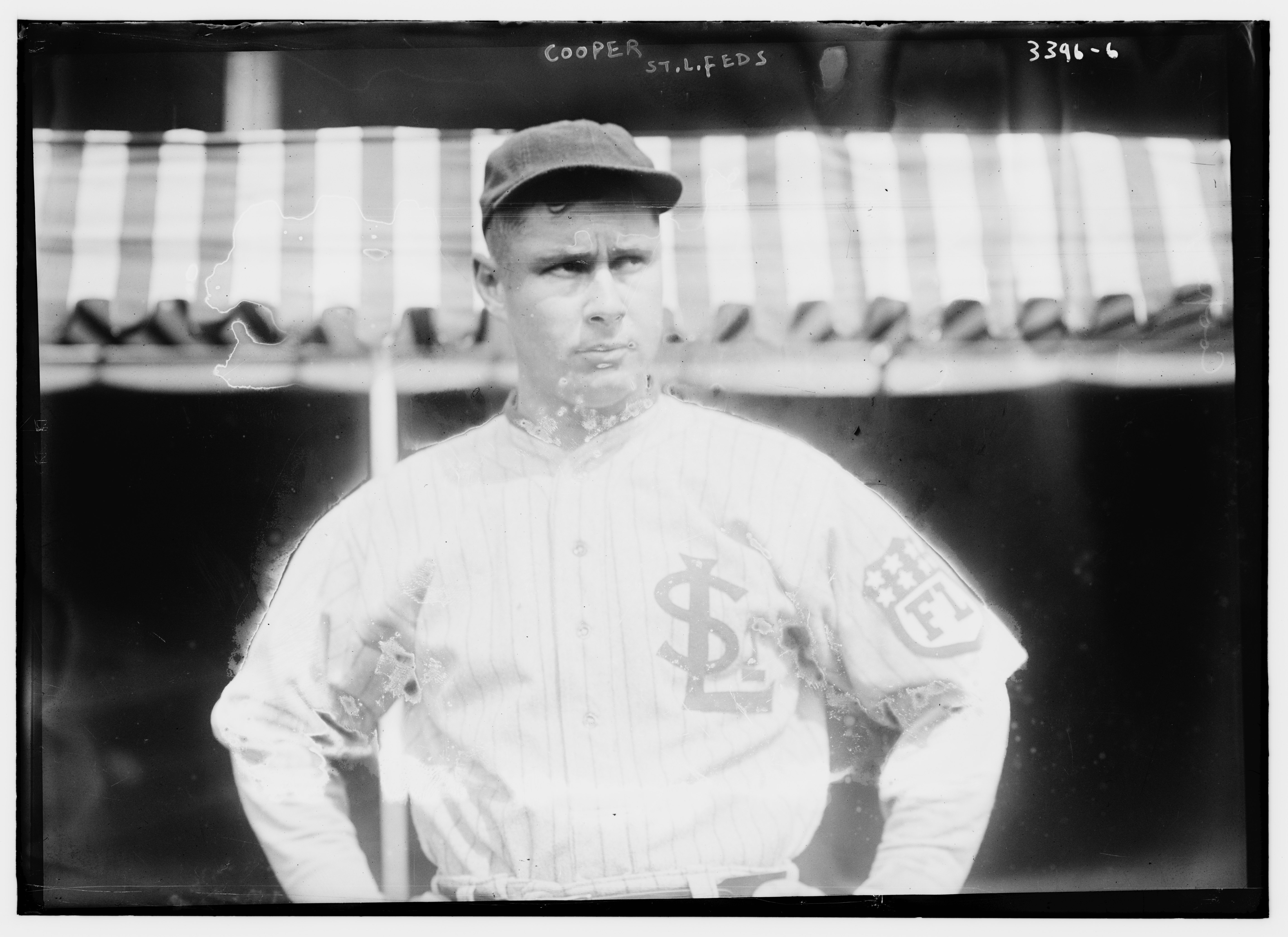
- Pitcher
- Born: June 24, 1887; Staunton, Illinois, US
- Died: August 14, 1960 (aged 73); Marion, Illinois, US
- Batted: Left Threw: Left

MLB debut
- April 19, 1914, for the St. Louis Terriers

Last MLB appearance
- October 6, 1914, for the St. Louis Terriers

MLB statistics
- Win–loss record: 8–20
- Strikeouts: 70
- Earned run average: 4.27
- Stats at Baseball Reference

Teams
- St. Louis Terriers (1914)

Henry John Keupper (July 24, 1887 – August 14, 1960) was an American professional baseball player who played pitcher in the Major Leagues in 1914. He would play for the St. Louis Terriers.

Keupper played semi-professional baseball in Southern Illinois until friends recommended him to Frank Donnelly, manager of the Peoria Distillers, who happened to be in Southern Illinois on a hunting trip. His proponents compared him to Orval Overall and Donnelly gave him his first job in professional baseball with the Distillers.
