= Mike Simon =

American baseball player (1883–1963)

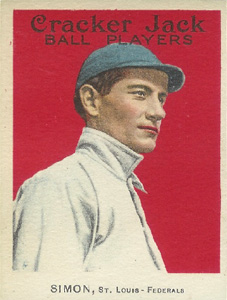
- Pitcher
- Born: April 13, 1883; Hayden, Indiana, U.S.
- Died: June 10, 1963 (aged 80); Los Angeles, California, U.S.
- Batted: Right Threw: Right

MLB debut
- June 27, 1909, for the Pittsburgh Pirates

Last MLB appearance
- September 30, 1915, for the Brooklyn Tip-Tops

MLB statistics
- Batting average: .225
- Home runs: 1
- Runs batted in: 90
- Stats at Baseball Reference

Teams
- Pittsburgh Pirates (1909–1913); St. Louis Terriers (1914); Brooklyn Tip-Tops (1915)

Mike Simon (April 13, 1883 – June 10, 1963) was an American catcher in Major League Baseball between 1909 and 1915.

== Sources ==
- Career statistics from Baseball Reference · Baseball Reference (Minors) · Retrosheet · Baseball Almanac
