= Ed Willett =

American baseball player (1884–1934)

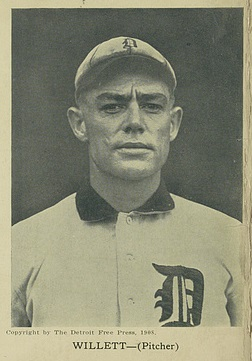
- Ed Willett in 1908
- Pitcher
- Born: March 7, 1884; Norfolk, Virginia, U.S.
- Died: May 10, 1934 (aged 50); Wellington, Kansas, U.S.
- Batted: Right Threw: Right

MLB debut
- September 5, 1906, for the Detroit Tigers

Last MLB appearance
- September 23, 1915, for the St. Louis Terriers

MLB statistics
- Win–loss record: 102–100
- Strikeouts: 600
- Earned run average: 3.08
- Stats at Baseball Reference

Teams
- Detroit Tigers (1906–1913); St. Louis Terriers (1914–1915)

Robert Edgar Willett (March 7, 1884 – May 10, 1934), sometimes known by the nickname "Farmer", was a right-handed American baseball pitcher. He played professional baseball for 17 years from 1905 to 1921, including ten seasons in Major League Baseball with the Detroit Tigers of the American League from 1906 to 1913 and the St. Louis Terriers of the Federal League from 1914 to 1915. In 274 major league games, Willett compiled a 102–100 win–loss record with 142 complete games, an earned run average (ERA) of 3.08, 600 strikeouts, and 695 assists in 1,773 innings pitched.

== Early years ==
Willett was born in Norfolk, Virginia, in 1884. He moved to Caldwell, Kansas, in his youth.

== Professional baseball career ==
=== Wichita Jobbers ===
Willett began his professional baseball career in the Western Association, playing for the Wichita Jobbers in 1905 and 1906. He compiled a 10–5 win–loss record with a 2.69 earned run average (ERA) in 16 games during the 1905 season and a 12–17 record in 38 games for Wichita in 1906. On August 27, 1906, in his final game in a Wichita uniform, Willett held Webb City to one run in 15 innings. Although he lost more games than he won in 1906, he reportedly lost a number of games on flukes and was regarded by many as the best pitcher in the Western Association.

=== Detroit Tigers ===
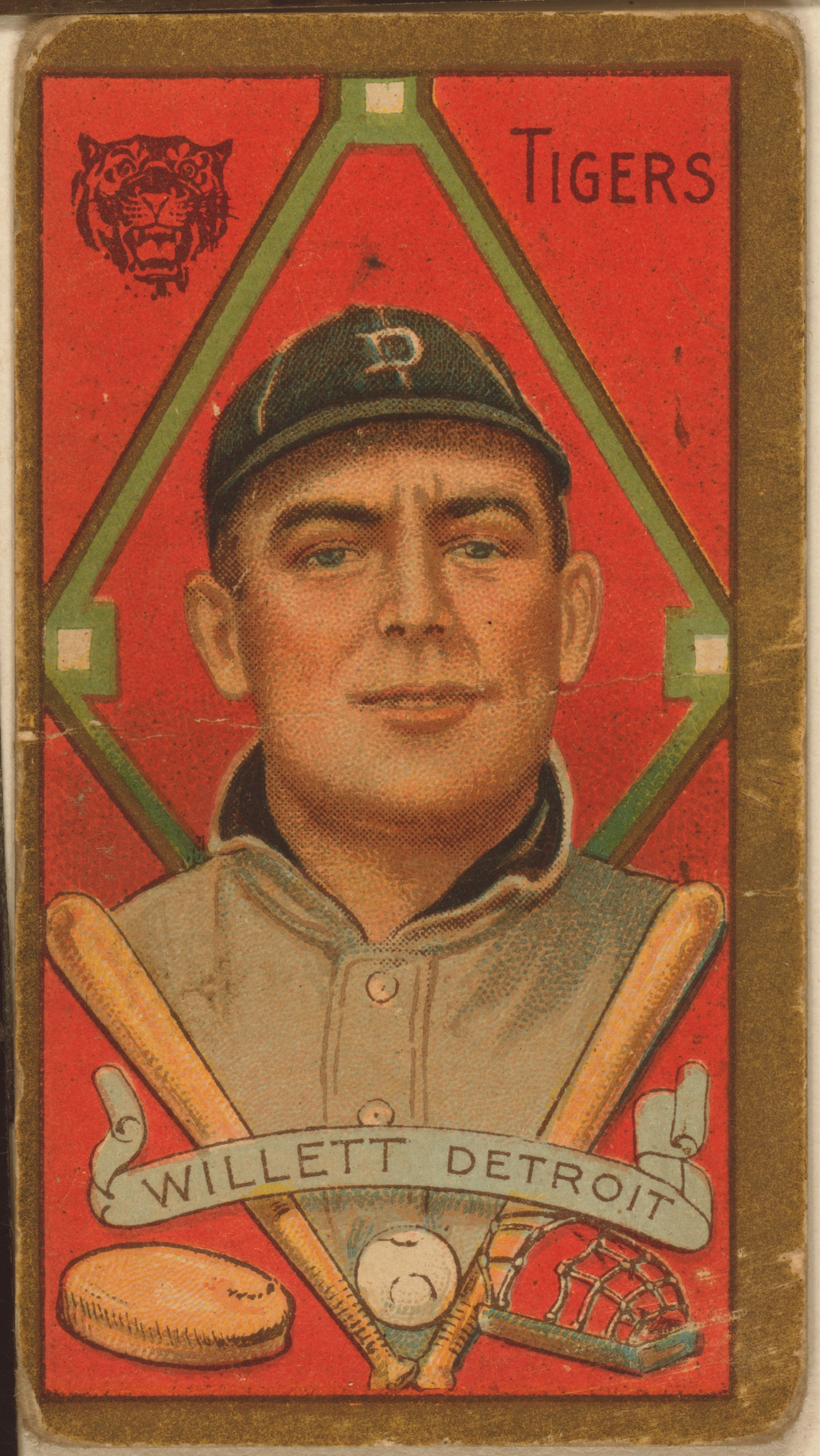
Willett's 1911 American Tobacco card

On August 9, 1906, Willett was purchased from Wichita by the Detroit Tigers, and became the first Western Association player to make it with a major league club. Originally scheduled to remain with Wichita through the end of the 1906 season, the Tigers asked in late August that he report early. Willett made his major league debut with Detroit on September 5, 1906, pitching a five-hitter against Chicago. In the final month of the 1906 season, Willett appeared in three games, all as a starter, and compiled a 0–3 record with a 3.96 ERA.

In 1907, Willett saw limited action with the Tigers, appearing in 10 games, six as a starter, and compiled a 1–5 record with a 3.70 ERA in 48 2/3 innings pitched.

Willett became a regular starting pitcher for the 1908 Detroit Tigers team that won the American League pennant. He appeared in 30 games, 23 as a starter, and compiled a 15–8 record with a 2.28 ERA and 77 strikeouts in 197 1/3 innings pitched.

Willett's best season was 1909 when he appeared in 41 games, 34 as a starter, and compiled a 21–10 record with a 2.34 ERA. He ranked among the American League leaders with 21 wins (third) and a .677 winning percentage (sixth). He also appeared in two games as a relief pitcher in the 1909 World Series, giving up no earned runs and three hits in 7 2/3 innings pitched against the Pittsburgh Pirates.

Willett had another strong season in 1910. He appeared in 37 games, 25 as a starter, and compiled a 16–11 record and a 2.37 ERA. He remained a regular starting pitcher for the Tigers through the 1913 season, compiling records of 13–14 in 1911, 17–15 in 1912, and 13–14 in 1913.

=== St. Louis Terriers ===
In January 1914, Willett signed a contract to play for Mordecai Brown's St. Louis Terriers in the Federal League. The Terriers finished in eighth place in the Federal League in 1914, and Willett compiled a career-worst 4–17 record with a 4.27 ERA in 27 games. In 1915, Willett returned to the Terriers, though he was converted into a relief pitcher. He appeared in 17 games, all but two games in relief, and compiled a 2–3 record with a 4.61 ERA. He appeared in his last major league game on September 23, 1915, at age 31.

=== Major league career overview ===
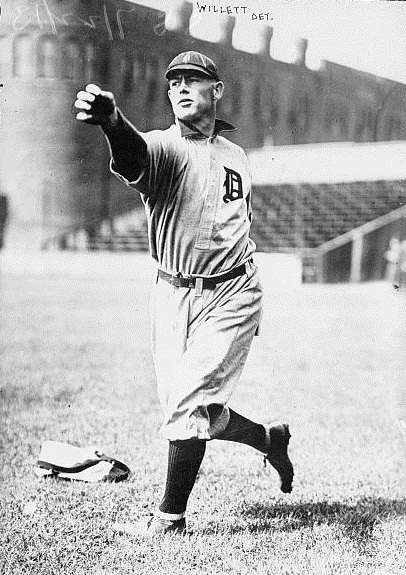
Willett in 1912

Throughout his career, Willett had a propensity to hit batters with his pitches. He led the American League with 17 hit batsmen in 1912 and was among the league leaders seven straight years from 1908 to 1914. His career total of 106 hit batsmen ranks 78th in major league history.

Willett was an excellent fielding pitcher, consistently achieving a range factor in excess of the league average. Over his career, he had a range factor of 2.89 — 71 points higher than the league average of 2.09 for pitchers. In 1910, Willett had 113 assists in 224 innings pitched, meaning that he had an assist every other inning. His range factor of 3.38 in 1912 was a remarkable 1.43 points higher than the league average of 1.95 — meaning Willett got to nearly twice as many batted balls as the typical pitcher of his era.

Willett was also a good hitter for a pitcher, batting .268 with a .333 on-base percentage and a .427 slugging percentage in 1911. In 1913, he raised his batting average to .283. Detroit trainer Harry Tuthill later recalled, "Ed always could hit, but he gave the fans a real thrill one afternoon at old Bennett Park, by clouting two home runs. And in that era of the comparatively dead ball, two home runs in a single game was quite a feat."

In 274 career games, Willett had a 102–100 win–loss record with 142 complete games, an earned run average of 3.08, 600 strikeouts, and 695 assists in 1,773 innings pitched.

As a hitter, Willett was above average, posting a .199 batting average (130-for-652) with 56 runs, 5 home runs and 63 RBI. Defensively, he was above average, recording a .949 fielding percentage which was seven points higher than the league average at his position.

=== Minor leagues ===
Although his major league career ended with St. Louis in 1915, he continued to play in the minor leagues through the 1919 season, playing for the Memphis Chickasaws of the Southern Association in 1916, the New Orleans Pelicans of the Southern Association in 1917, and the Salt Lake City Bees of the Pacific Coast League in 1918 and 1919. In 1920, he played for the Rexburg, Idaho, club in the Snake River-Yellowstone League. He began the 1921 season with the Blankenship team in the Pacific International League and also played for a Victoria, British Columbia, team in the first half of the 1921 season.

=== Managerial career ===
On June 4, 1921, Willett took over as a player-manager for the Ogden Gunners in the Northern Utah League. He led Ogden to the second half pennant. He went on to manage the Grand Island Champions in 1922 and the Beatrice Blues in 1923, both clubs playing in the Nebraska State League.

== Family and later years ==
Willett was married in 1908 and filed for divorce the following year in October 1909. He remarried to Elizabeth White on October 25, 1910, in St. Louis.

Willett lived in Wellington, Kansas, in his later years and was managing an amateur baseball club there at the time of his death. He died from a heart attack in 1934 at age 50 in Wellington; he was found dead in his hotel room. He was buried at the Caldwell Cemetery in Caldwell, Kansas.

== See also ==
- List of Major League Baseball career hit batsmen leaders
