= Delos Drake =

American baseball player (1886–1965)

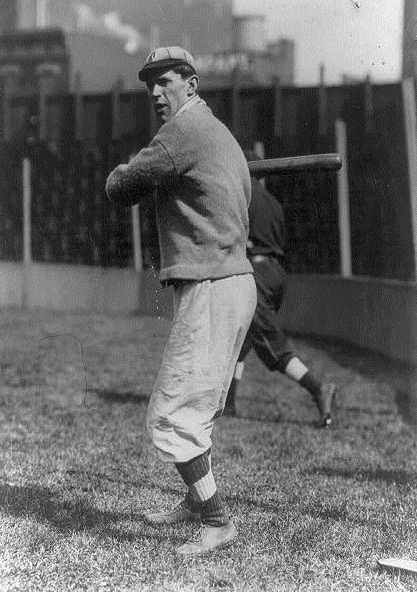
- Drake in 1914
- Outfielder
- Born: December 3, 1886; Girard, Ohio, U.S.
- Died: October 3, 1965 (aged 78); Findlay, Ohio, U.S.
- Batted: Right Threw: Left

MLB debut
- April 30, 1911, for the Detroit Tigers

Last MLB appearance
- September 29, 1915, for the St. Louis Terriers

MLB statistics
- Batting average: .263
- Hits: 308
- Runs batted in: 119
- Stats at Baseball Reference

Teams
- Detroit Tigers (1911); St. Louis Terriers (1914–1915)

Delos Daniel Drake (December 3, 1886 – October 3, 1965) was an American professional baseball player from 1906 to 1916. He played three seasons of Major League Baseball as an outfielder for the Detroit Tigers in 1911 and for the St. Louis Terriers in 1914 and 1915. He appeared in 335 major league games, compiling a .263 batting average with 50 doubles, 21 triples, five home runs, 119 RBIs and 43 stolen bases.

== Early years ==
Drake was born in Girard, Ohio, in 1886. He was the son of Dr. William and Mary Drake. His father was the manager of a semi-pro baseball team in Findlay, Ohio, in the 1890s. Drake learned the game while practicing with players from his father's team.

== Professional baseball career ==
=== Minor leagues ===
Drake began his professional baseball career playing in the Ohio–Pennsylvania League for the Newark (Ohio) Cotton Tops in 1906 and the Marion Moguls in 1907. Over the next three years, he also played minor league ball for the Johnstown Johnnies (1908), Newark Indians (1909), and Wilkes-Barre Barons (1910–1911). He compiled batting averages of .326 and .340 in his two seasons at Wilkes-Barre.

=== Detroit Tigers ===
After his strong showing in Wilkes-Barre, Drake signed to play for the Detroit Tigers during the 1911 season. He appeared in 95 games for the Tigers in 1911, principally in left field in a Detroit outfield that also featured future Baseball Hall of Famers Ty Cobb in center field and Sam Crawford in right field. During the 1911 season, Drake compiled a .279 batting average with nine triples, 20 stolen bases and 36 RBIs.

=== Return to the minors ===
Despite a strong showing in his rookie season, Drake did not make the Tigers' lineup in 1912—a lineup that was loaded with outfielders, including Cobb, Crawford, the popular veteran left fielder Davy Jones and a new rookie left fielder Bobby Veach. Accordingly, Drake spent the 1913 and 1914 seasons in the minor leagues playing for the Providence Grays and Kansas City Blues. He compiled a career high .343 batting average in 1912 for Kansas City.

=== St. Louis Terriers ===
In 1914, Drake returned to a major league squad—the St. Louis Terriers of the new Federal League. He was a starting outfielder for the Terriers in both 1914 and 1915, playing 97 games in center field, 78 in left field, and 44 in right field. During his two seasons in the Federal League, Drake compiled a .257 batting average with 41 doubles, 12 triples, four home runs, 83 RBIs, and 23 stolen bases.

== Family and later years ==
Drake was married in 1911 to Catherine Bernadette Loftus. Their children included Delos D. Drake, Jr., Robert W. Drake and William J. Drake.

After leaving baseball, Drake worked for Marathon Oil for over 30 years until his retirement in 1951. He was also a prize-winning trap shooter. Drake died in 1965 at age 78, shortly after the death of his wife Catherine. Both died at Blanchard Valley Hospital in Findlay, Ohio.
