= Ernie Herbert =

American baseball player (1887–1968)

- Pitcher
- Born: January 30, 1887; Breckenridge, Missouri, U.S.
- Died: January 13, 1968 (aged 80); Dallas, Texas, U.S.
- Batted: Right Threw: Right

MLB debut
- July 27, 1913, for the Cincinnati Reds

Last MLB appearance
- September 13, 1915, for the St. Louis Terriers

MLB statistics
- Win–loss record: 2–0
- Earned run average: 3.27
- Strikeouts: 52
- Stats at Baseball Reference

Teams
- Cincinnati Reds (1913); St. Louis Terriers (1914–1915)

Earn Albert "Ernie" Herbert (January 30, 1887 – January 13, 1968), nicknamed "Tex", was an American Major League Baseball pitcher who played for the Cincinnati Reds in 1913 and the St. Louis Terriers in 1914 and 1915. He holds the major league career record for most innings pitched (115.2) without a loss.
