= Doc Watson (baseball) =

American baseball player (1885–1949)

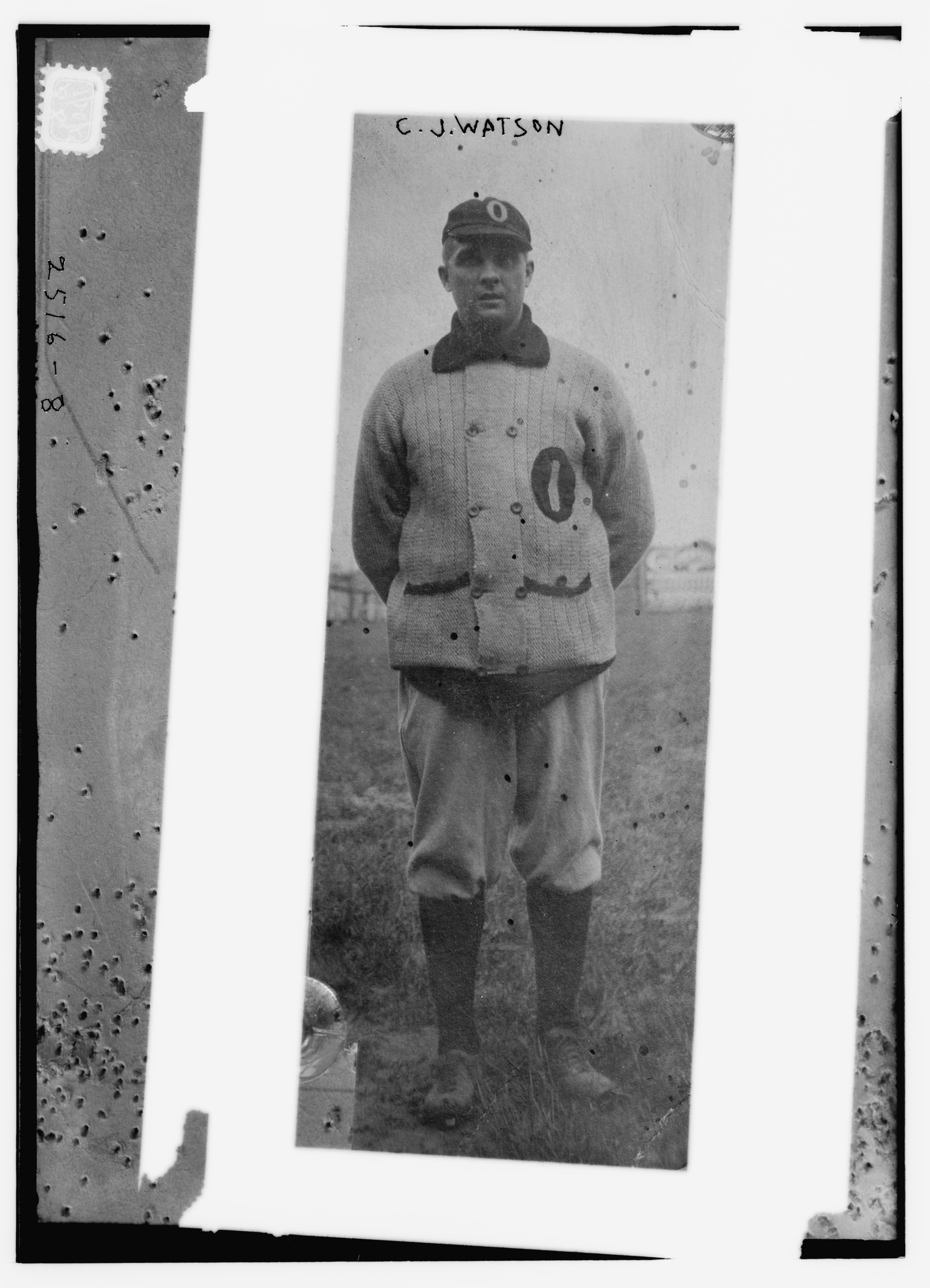
- Pitcher
- Born: January 30, 1885; Carroll County, Ohio, U.S.
- Died: December 30, 1949 (aged 64); San Diego, California, U.S.
- Batted: Left Threw: Left

MLB debut
- September 3, 1913, for the Chicago Cubs

Last MLB appearance
- September 21, 1915, for the St. Louis Terriers

MLB statistics
- Win–loss record: 22–21
- Earned run average: 2.70
- Strikeouts: 133
- Stats at Baseball Reference

Teams
- Chicago Cubs (1913); Chicago Chi-Feds (1914); St. Louis Terriers (1914–1915)

Charles John "Doc" Watson (January 30, 1885 – December 30, 1949) was an American professional baseball player who played as a pitcher in Major League Baseball.
