= Hughie Miller =

American baseball player (1886-1945)

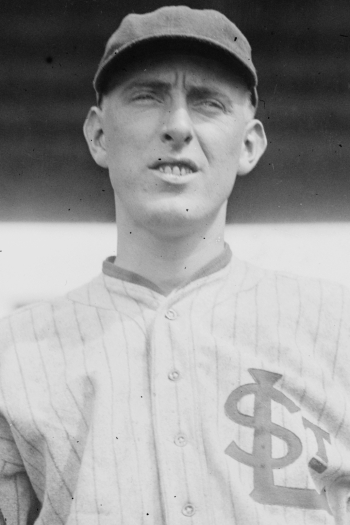
- First baseman
- Born: December 22, 1886; St. Louis, Missouri, US
- Died: December 24, 1945 (aged 59); Jefferson Barracks, Missouri, US
- Batted: Right Threw: Right

MLB debut
- June 18, 1911, for the Philadelphia Phillies

Last MLB appearance
- September 18, 1915, for the St. Louis Terriers

MLB statistics
- Batting average: .226
- Home runs: 0
- Runs batted in: 49
- Stats at Baseball Reference

Teams
- Philadelphia Phillies (1911); St. Louis Terriers (1914–1915)
Military career
Allegiance	United States
Branch	United States Marine Corps
Service years	1917–1919
Rank	Private
Conflicts	World War I
Awards	Distinguished Service Cross; Purple Heart

Hugh Stanley Miller (December 22, 1886 – December 24, 1945) was an American professional baseball first baseman. Miller played in Major League Baseball for the Philadelphia Phillies of the National League in 1911 and the St. Louis Terriers of the Federal League in 1914 and 1915. He batted and threw right-handed.

Miller joined the United States Marine Corps during World War I. He fought in the Battle of Belleau Wood, despite having a fever and being ordered to the back by his commanding officer, and took two Germans captive, earning the Distinguished Service Cross. Later in 1918, he was wounded at the Battle of Soissons and the Battle of Saint-Mihiel, and received a Purple Heart after the war.

== Early life ==
Miller was born on December 22, 1886, in St. Louis, Missouri. He was the second of four children born to John and Elizabeth Miller, who had immigrated to the United States from Scotland. Miller attended Christian Brothers College, where he played baseball.

== Baseball career ==
Miller made his professional baseball debut with the Keokuk Indians of the Class D Central Association in 1908. He also played for Keokuk in 1909 and 1910, and developed the reputation for being a strong defensive first baseman. After the 1910 season, he was drafted by the Philadelphia Phillies of the National League. Miller competed with Fred Luderus and Kitty Bransfield for playing time at first base. However, Luderus had a strong season for the Phillies in 1911, and Miller remained on the bench. Miller appeared in one game for the Phillies, as a pinch runner during the game of June 18, 1911, and did not receive a plate appearance.

In late June 1911, Miller requested and received his release from the Phillies so that he could join the Buffalo Bisons of the Class A Eastern League. After the 1911 season, the Phillies recalled Miller from Buffalo and traded him to the Sacramento Senators of the Class AA Pacific Coast League for Ben Hunt. After playing for Sacramento in 1912, he lost the first base position with Sacramento in 1913 to Tom Tennant. Sacramento sent Miller to the Montreal Royals of the Class AA International League, where Bransfield had become the manager.

Before the 1914 season, Miller left Montreal for the St. Louis Terriers of the outlaw Federal League. In 132 games for St. Louis, he batted .222, though his .990 fielding percentage was the third-best in the Federal League among first basemen. During the 1915 season, the Terriers demoted Miller to the Colonial League, the minor league affiliated with the Federal League. He played for the Taunton Herrings until the team folded, and Miller finished the Colonial League season with the Springfield Tips. Miller was recalled to the Terriers in September. He played in seven games for St. Louis, and batted .500 (3-for-6).

The Federal League folded after the 1915 season, and the Terriers were merged into the St. Louis Browns of the American League. The Browns sought waivers on Miller, and assigned him to the Spokane Indians of the Class B Northwestern League. He refused to report, and St. Louis attempted to send him to the Memphis Chicks of the Class A Southern Association. Miller refused to report there as well, and left baseball.

== Military service ==
Following America's entry into World War I in April 1917, Miller enlisted in the United States Marine Corps as a private in June. He deployed to France with the 4th Marine Expeditionary Brigade in the 2nd Infantry Division, reaching the front lines in March 1918.

Miller's official citation

In the Bois de Belleau, on June 6, 1918, he captured single-handed, two of the enemy. Although in a weakened condition, he continued to perform his duty through the engagement.

Miller was hospitalized with a fever, but disobeyed his superior officer's command to stay in the rear so that he could participate in the Battle of Belleau Wood on June 6, 1918. He captured two German soldiers single-handedly. One of the soldiers was an officer. Miller was awarded the Distinguished Service Cross for his actions by General John J. Pershing.

Miller recovered from his fever and remained with his unit. He was wounded on July 18 at the Battle of Soissons by a machine gun bullet wound to his shoulder. He was hospitalized for about a month, and then was wounded again on September 12 at the Battle of Saint-Mihiel when a bomb exploded near him. Doctors were able to save his leg.

Miller returned to the United States in December 1918. He received an honorable discharge from the Marines in May 1919. He received the Purple Heart in 1932, when the award was initiated.

== Later life ==
Miller returned to St. Louis after the war. He worked for a local newspaper, and then began to apply to minor leagues to become an umpire. He was hired as an umpire by the Class A Texas League for the 1920 season, but he resigned over the summer because of the limitations from his leg injury. Miller returned to the Marines as a recruiter, and was promoted to sergeant, but received another honorable discharge due to his war injuries in January 1922.

In 1927, Miller married Margaret Icenhower, who worked in a beauty salon and had two children from a previous marriage. After the end of prohibition, Miller operated a tavern in St. Louis with Grover Cleveland Alexander, a former teammate with Philadelphia, as his partner.

Miller was hospitalized in the veteran's hospital at the Jefferson Barracks Military Post, south of St. Louis, for a broken hip in November 1945. He died there from heart disease on December 24, 1945. He was buried in the Jefferson Barracks National Cemetery.
