= Grover Hartley =

American baseball player (1888–1964)

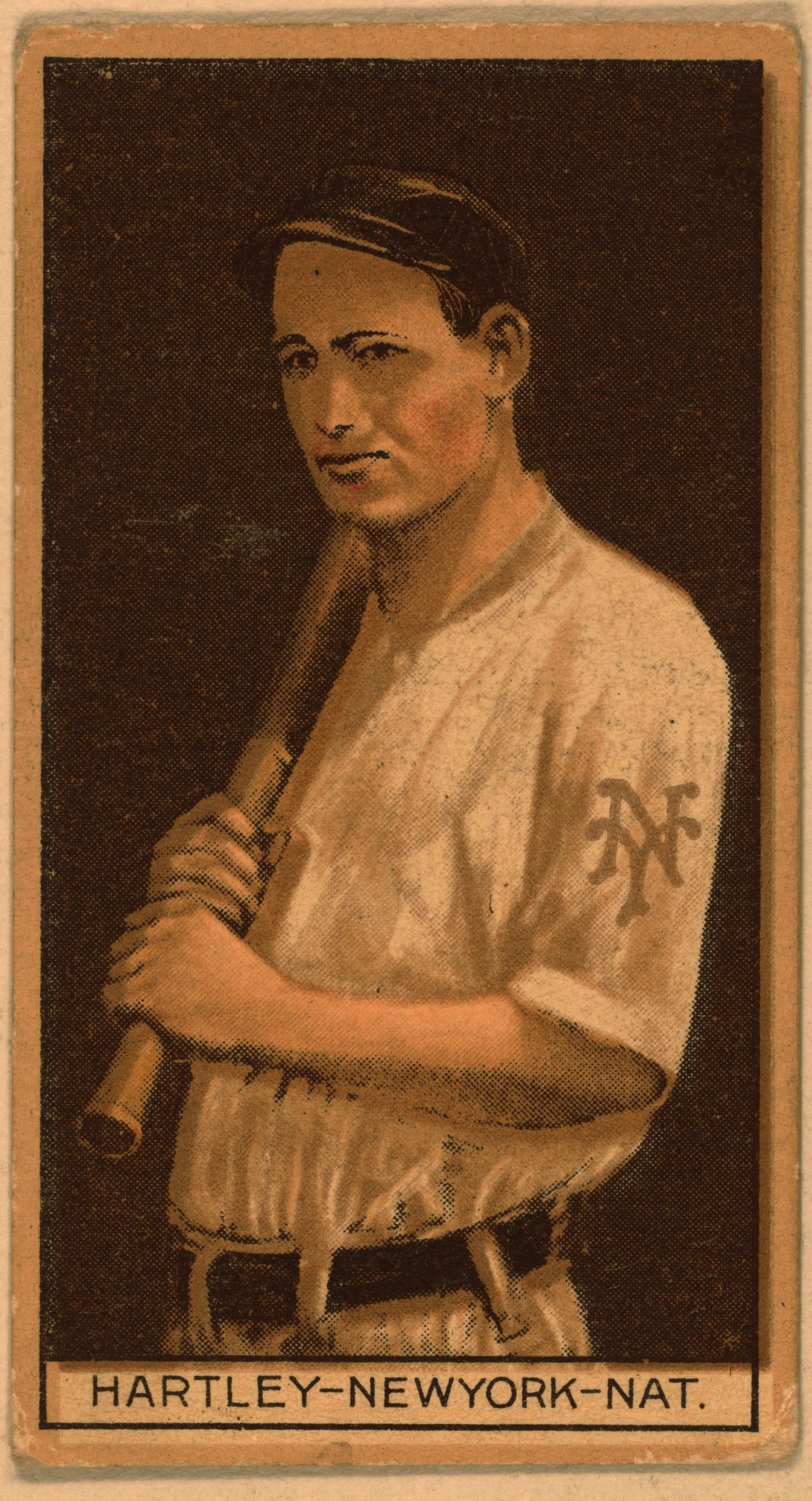
- Grover Hartley baseball card
- Catcher
- Born: July 2, 1888; Osgood, Indiana, U.S.
- Died: October 19, 1964 (aged 76); Daytona Beach, Florida, U.S.
- Batted: Right Threw: Right

MLB debut
- May 13, 1911, for the New York Giants

Last MLB appearance
- September 30, 1934, for the St. Louis Browns

MLB statistics
- Batting average: .268
- Home runs: 3
- Runs batted in: 144
- Stats at Baseball Reference

Teams
- New York Giants (1911–1913); St. Louis Terriers (1914–1915); St. Louis Browns (1916–1917); New York Giants (1924–1926); Boston Red Sox (1927); Cleveland Indians (1929–1930); St. Louis Browns (1934)

Grover Allen Hartley (July 2, 1888 – October 19, 1964) was an American backup catcher in Major League Baseball. From 1911 through 1934, he played for the New York Giants (1911–13, 1924–26), St. Louis Terriers (1914–15), St. Louis Browns (1916–17, 1934), Boston Red Sox (1927) and Cleveland Indians (1930). Hartley batted and threw right-handed. He was born in Osgood, Indiana.

In a 14-season career, Hartley was a .268 hitter with three home runs and 144 RBI in 569 games played.

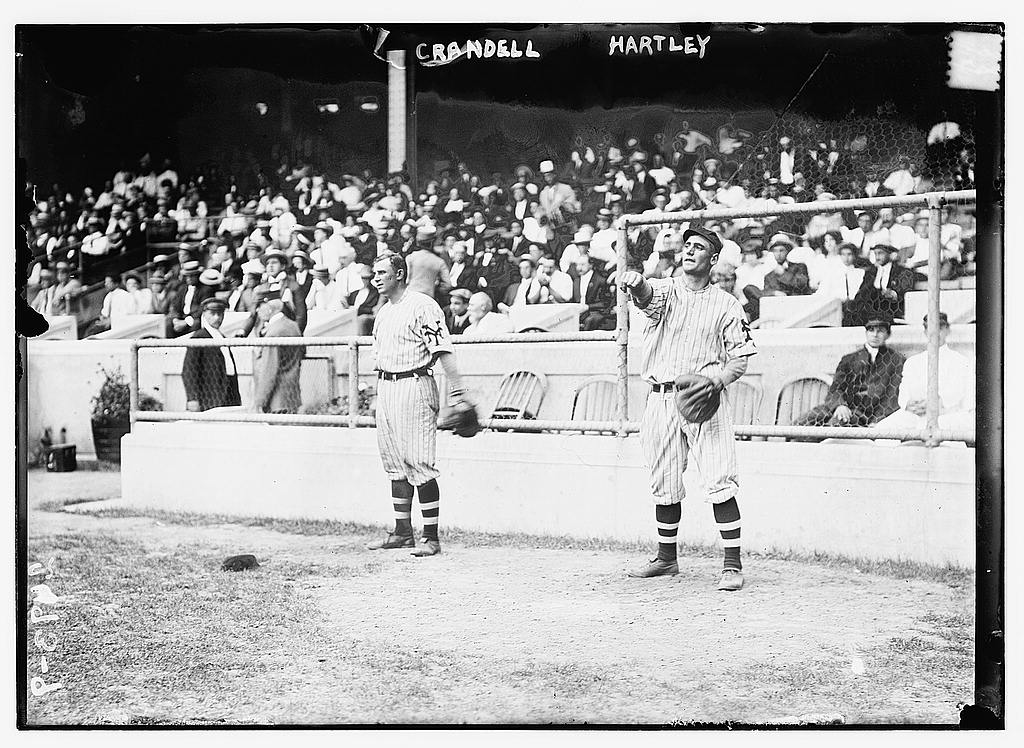
Doc Crandall (left) & Grover Hartley (right) at Polo Grounds ca. 1912

Hartley was a catcher with good defensive skills as he took responsibility for getting the most out of his pitchers, and worked hard at ensuring their success. He debuted with the New York Giants in 1911, appearing in part of three seasons. In 1914 he jumped to the outlaw Federal League, becoming a regular with the St. Louis Terriers for the next two years, and later shared catching tenures for the St. Louis Browns, Boston Red Sox, Cleveland Indians, and new stints with the Giants and Browns, retiring at the end of the 1934 season. Between his stints with the Browns and Giants, he spent seven years in the minor leagues with the Columbus Senators.

In 1935 Hartley became an American League umpire. He also managed in the minors and coached for the Giants, Browns, Pirates and Indians.

Hartley died in Daytona Beach, Florida, at the age of 76.
