= Al Bridwell =

American baseball player (1884–1969)

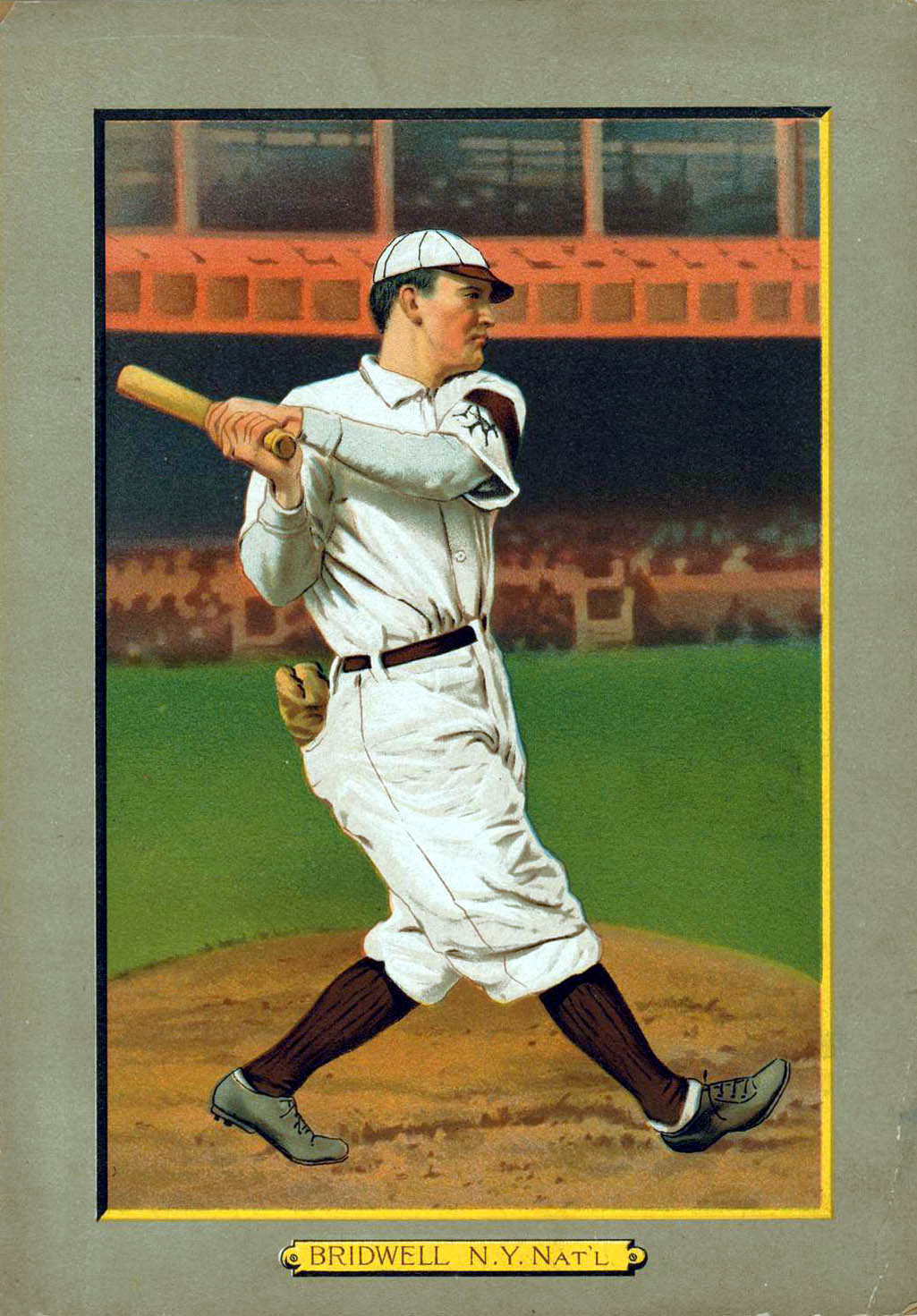
- 1911 baseball card of Bridwell
- Shortstop
- Born: January 4, 1884; Friendship, Ohio, U.S.
- Died: January 23, 1969 (aged 85); Portsmouth, Ohio, U.S.
- Batted: Left Threw: Right

MLB debut
- April 16, 1905, for the Cincinnati Reds

Last MLB appearance
- September 23, 1915, for the St. Louis Terriers

MLB statistics
- Batting average: .255
- Home runs: 2
- Runs batted in: 350
- Stats at Baseball Reference

Teams
- Cincinnati Reds (1905); Boston Beaneaters/Doves (1906–1907); New York Giants (1908–1911); Boston Rustlers/Braves (1911–1912); Chicago Cubs (1913); St. Louis Terriers (1914–1915)

Albert Henry Bridwell (January 4, 1884 – January 23, 1969) was an American shortstop in Major League Baseball (MLB). He played for several MLB teams, most notably the New York Giants from 1908 to 1911, when the team was managed by John McGraw.

== Baseball career ==
During his 11-year major league career from 1905 to 1915, Bridwell was regarded as a good fielder but never had a .300 batting average. His career-high was .294 in 1909. In 1,252 career games played, Bridwell batted .255 with 1,064 hits, 95 doubles, 32 triples, 2 home runs, 457 runs scored, and 350 runs batted in.

Bridwell is best known for hitting the apparent walk-off single which led to Merkle's Boner in a September 1908 game. The hit was nullified due to baserunner Fred Merkle's failure to touch second base, and because the crowd was already on the field, the game between the Giants and Chicago Cubs was ruled a tie. The two teams ended up tied for first at the end of the season and had to play a makeup game, which the Cubs won.

Bridwell never played in a World Series. Midway through the 1911 season, he was traded by the Giants, who went on to play in the 1911 World Series, to the Boston Rustlers.

On John McGraw's managing style, Bridwell later said: "He knew how to handle men, some players he rode and others he didn't. He got the most out of each man." Bridwell's pugnaciousness fit right in with McGraw's style of play. Bridwell once punched McGraw in the nose, earning a two-game suspension.

== Personal life ==
In 1906, Bridwell married Margaret Lorraine McMahon. The couple's only child, Mary Jane, was born in 1914.

Bridwell was interviewed for Lawrence Ritter's 1966 book The Glory of Their Times. Bridwell died in 1969 at age 85.
