= Doc Crandall =

American baseball player (1887–1951)

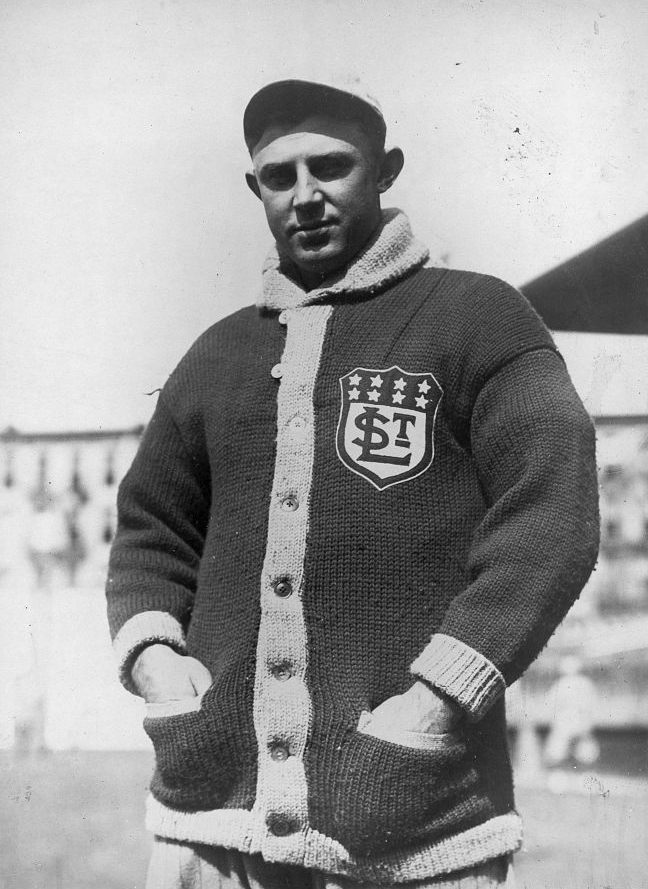
- Crandall with the St. Louis Terriers in 1914
- Pitcher
- Born: October 8, 1887; Wadena, Indiana, U.S.
- Died: August 17, 1951 (aged 63); Bell, California, U.S.
- Batted: Right Threw: Right

MLB debut
- April 24, 1908, for the New York Giants

Last MLB appearance
- August 31, 1918, for the Boston Braves

MLB statistics
- Win–loss record: 102–62
- Earned run average: 2.92
- Strikeouts: 606
- Stats at Baseball Reference

Teams
- New York Giants (1908–1913); St. Louis Cardinals (1913); New York Giants (1913); St. Louis Terriers (1914–1915); St. Louis Browns (1916); Boston Braves (1918)

James Otis Crandall (October 8, 1887 – August 17, 1951) was an American right-handed pitcher and second baseman. He was the first player to be consistently used as a relief pitcher. Consequently, he was given the nickname Doc by Damon Runyon who said Crandall was "the physician of the pitching emergency". He played from 1908 to 1918, debuting with the New York Giants. He was traded to the St. Louis Cardinals in 1913, but made only two pinch-hitting appearances for them before being sold back to the Giants 13 days later. He also played for the St. Louis Terriers in the Federal League in 1914 and 1915, the St. Louis Browns in 1916, and for the Boston Braves in 1918. That same year he flirted with a no-hitter in the morning game of a double-header in Los Angeles against Salt Lake City of the Pacific Coast League. He carried the no-hitter into the 9th inning when, with two out, his outing was spoiled by Karl Crandall, his brother.

While Crandall frequently started, he led the league in number of relief appearances for five consecutive seasons while with the Giants. In the period from 1910 to 1912, he also led in relief victories going 45–16 overall in that time period. The Giants won three consecutive pennants from 1911 to 1913 with Crandall's help. Even with his bulky frame, Crandall was a quick fielder and thus played infield positions.

With his .285 lifetime hitting average, he was often used as a pinch hitter and in 1910 he led with a .342 batting average. When the Giants sent him to the Cardinals in 1913 public outcry in New York was so big that the Giants bought him back after only two games. However, he ended up in St. Louis again a year later in the Federal league where he played more at second base than as pitcher. In 1915 he led the Federal League winning six times as relief pitcher out of his total 21 wins in that league. After sitting out the 1917 season, he made an abbreviated comeback in 1918 with the Braves.

Crandall is a charter member of the Pacific Coast League Hall of Fame.
