= Dave Davenport =

American baseball player (1890–1954)

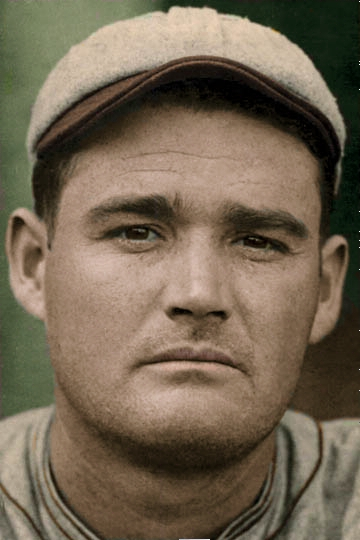
- Pitcher
- Born: February 20, 1890; Alexandria, Louisiana, U.S.
- Died: October 16, 1954 (aged 64); El Dorado, Arkansas, U.S.
- Batted: Right Threw: Right

MLB debut
- April 17, 1914, for the Cincinnati Reds

Last MLB appearance
- September 1, 1919, for the St. Louis Browns

MLB statistics
- Pitching Record: 73–83
- Earned run average: 2.93
- Strikeouts: 719
- Stats at Baseball Reference

Teams
- Cincinnati Reds (1914); St. Louis Terriers (1914–1915); St. Louis Browns (1916–1919)

David W. Davenport (February 20, 1890 – October 16, 1954), was a professional baseball player who played pitcher in the Major Leagues from 1914 to 1919. Davenport went on to play for the Cincinnati Reds, St. Louis Terriers, and the St. Louis Browns. He led the Federal League in strikeouts in 1915 while playing for the St. Louis Terriers. Davenport's Major League career was ended after he was involved in a scuffle with Browns manager Jimmy Burke, after being absent from the team in early September. He was fined $100 and suspended without pay for the rest of the season. Dave Davenport's .092 batting average in 1915 is the worst ever by a player with at least 140 plate appearances.

He was the brother of former major leaguer Claude Davenport.

== See also ==
- List of Major League Baseball annual strikeout leaders
- List of Major League Baseball no-hitters

== Sources ==
- Baseball Reference

Preceded by Jimmy Lavender	No-hitter pitcher September 7, 1915	Succeeded by Tom Hughes
