= Harry Chapman (baseball) =

American baseball player (1885–1918)

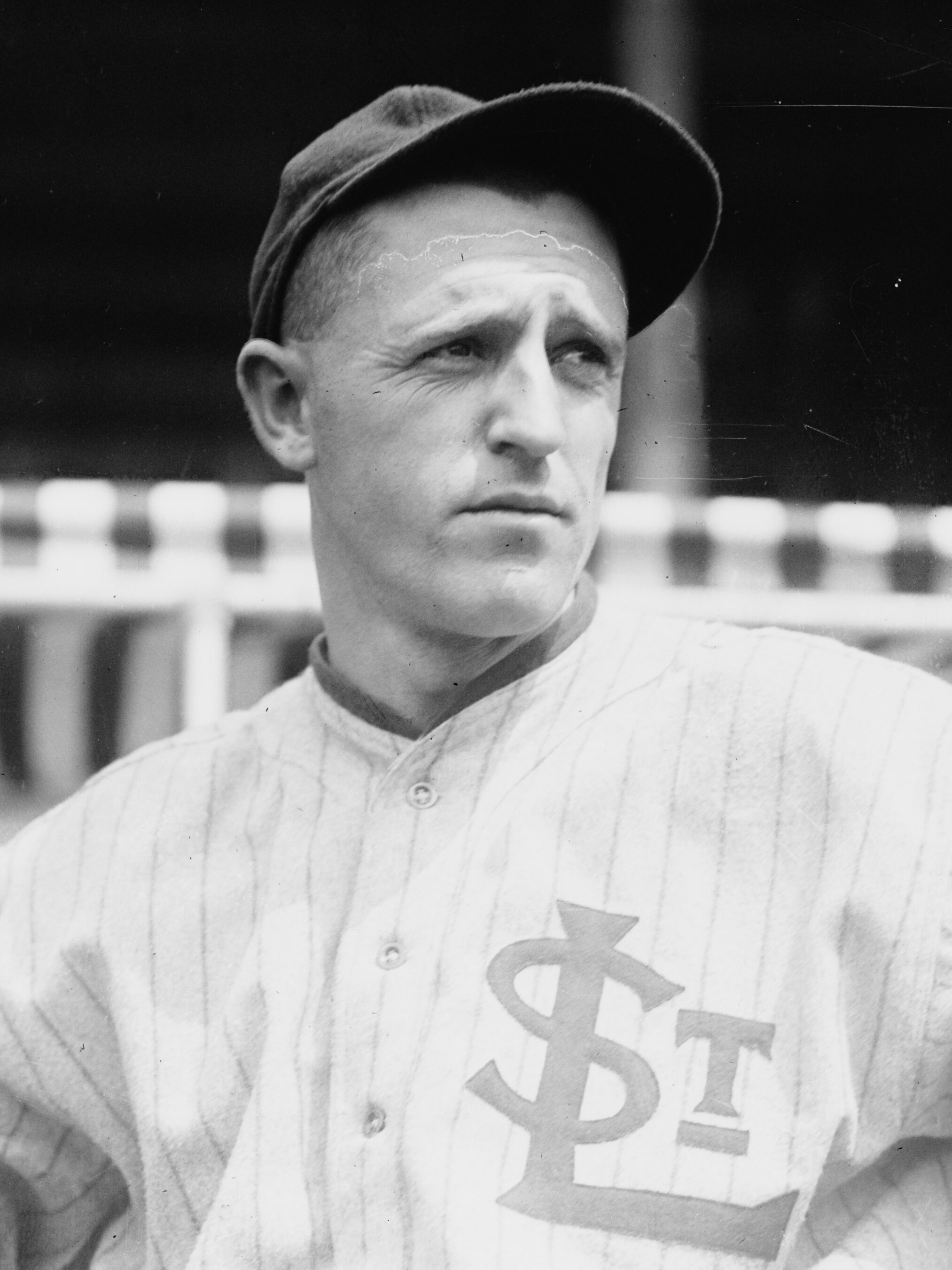
- Catcher
- Born: October 26, 1885; Severance, Kansas, US
- Died: October 21, 1918 (aged 32); Nevada, Missouri, US
- Batted: Right Threw: Right

MLB debut
- October 6, 1912, for the Chicago Cubs

Last MLB appearance
- July 19, 1916, for the St. Louis Browns

MLB statistics
- Batting average: .198
- Home runs: 1
- Run batted in: 44
- Stats at Baseball Reference

Teams
- Chicago Cubs (1912); Cincinnati Reds (1913); St. Louis Terriers (1914–1915); St. Louis Browns (1916)

Harry E. Chapman (October 26, 1885 – October 21, 1918) was a professional baseball player. He played all or part of five seasons in Major League Baseball for the Chicago Cubs, Cincinnati Reds, St. Louis Terriers, and St. Louis Browns, primarily as a catcher. He saw the majority of his action as a backup backstop for the Terriers in the Federal League. Chapman died of pneumonia following influenza in Nevada, Missouri.

== Early career ==
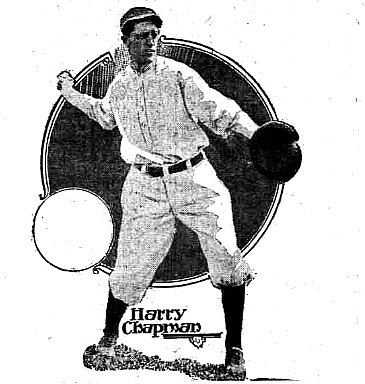
Harry Chapman from a newspaper

Chapman played minor league baseball in the Central Kansas League. He made his major league debut on October 6, 1912, the final game of the Chicago Cubs' season, and went 1-for-4 with a triple and an RBI (runs batted in). On December 15 that offseason, Chapman was traded by the Cubs, along with Grover Lowdermilk and future Hall of Famer Joe Tinker, to the Cincinnati Reds for five players. Chapman, however, played with the minor-league Atlanta Crackers for much of 1913. He made two pinch-hitting appearances for the Reds that season, singling and striking out.

== Federal League ==
The catcher was one of many MLB players to jump to the upstart Federal League in 1914, signing with the St. Louis Terriers. He played with them for both seasons of their existence, backing up Mike Simon and Grover Hartley. In 1914, Chapman hit .210 in 64 games with two doubles, a triple, and 14 RBI. In 1915, Chapman had the experience of playing for the league champions and had a somewhat more successful season himself, hitting .199 in 62 games with six doubles, three triples, one home run, and 29 RBI. His home run, the only such hit of his career, came off Baltimore's George Suggs.

== Later career ==
Just before the dissolution of the Federal League, the St. Louis Browns purchased Chapman's rights from the Terriers. However, his time with the Browns resulted in numbers well below his career averages, as Chapman hit just .097 (3 for 31) in 18 games with no extra-base hits or RBI. He played his final major league game in July 1916, and spent the last two seasons of his career toiling for the Little Rock Travelers of the Southern Association, playing a career-high 131 games in 1917.

Chapman died at age 30 in Nevada, Missouri, October 21, 1918, from influenza-induced pneumonia.

== See also ==
- List of baseball players who died during their careers
