= St. Louis Terriers =

- Logo

Information
- League: Federal League
- Location: St. Louis, Missouri
- Ballpark: Handlan's Park
- Founded: 1914
- Disbanded: 1915
- Colors: Royal blue, white
- Ownership: Phil Ball
- Manager: Fielder Jones (1915); Mordecai Brown & Fielder Jones (1914)

The St. Louis Terriers were a baseball club that played in the short-lived Federal League in 1914 and 1915. They played their home games at Handlan's Park. The team was owned by ice magnate Phil Ball, who later was owner of the St. Louis Browns.

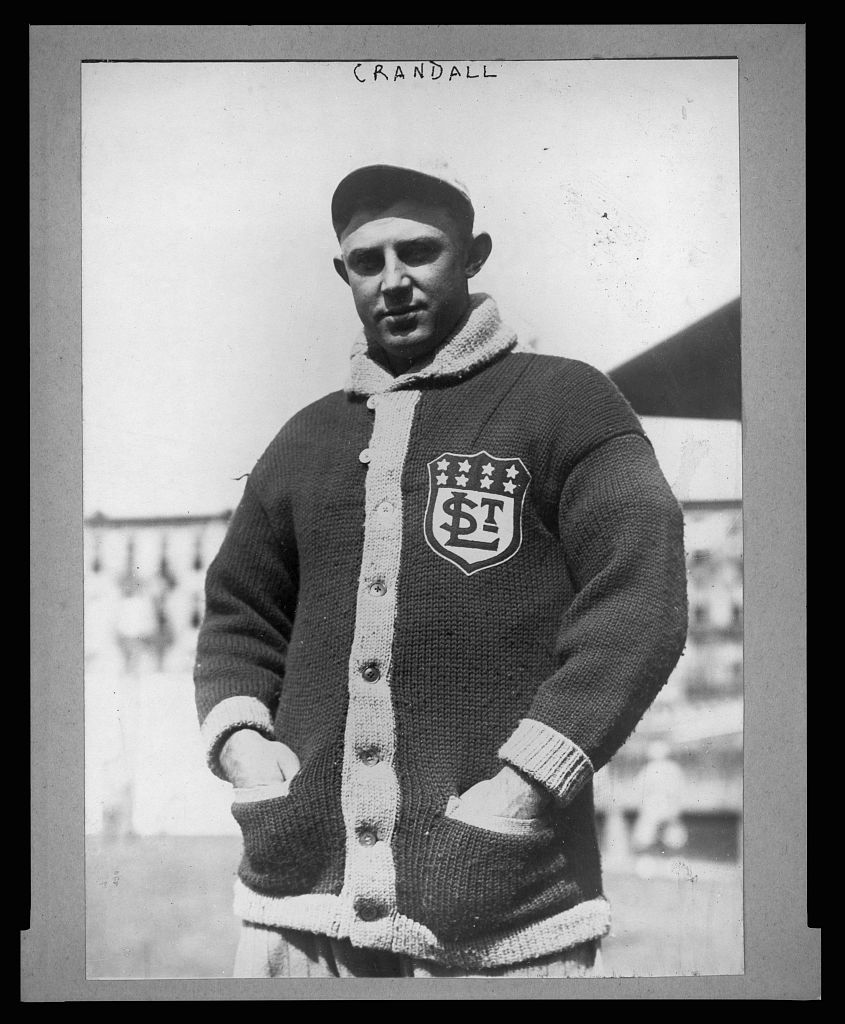
Doc Crandall, wearing the uniform and sweater of the St. Louis Terriers Federal League Baseball Club, ca. 1914

In their inaugural season, the Terriers posted a 62–89 record (.411) and finished in last place, 25 games behind the league champion Indianapolis Hoosiers. The team improved significantly the next year as they were pennant contenders until the last game of the season. The Terriers had an 87–67 mark (.565), ending up in second place, 1/10 of a percentage point behind the champion Chicago Whales, who finished 86–66 (.566).

== Notable players ==
Among the St. Louis Terriers players who had experience (or would gain experience) in the American and/or National Leagues were Dave Davenport, Al Bridwell, Mordecai Brown, Doc Crandall, Grover Hartley, Ward Miller, Bob Groom, Fielder Jones, Eddie Plank, Jack Tobin and Ed Willett.

== Baseball Hall of Famers ==
St. Louis Terriers Hall of Famers
Affiliation according to the National Baseball Hall of Fame and Museum

Mordecai Brown
Eddie Plank
J. Roy Stockton*

- Players and managers listed in **bold** are depicted on their Hall of Fame plaques wearing a Terriers cap insignia.
- * J.G. Taylor Spink award winner, covered Terriers in spring training in Havana, Cuba in 1914 and then regularly throughout 1914–1915.

== See also ==
- 1914 St. Louis Terriers season
- 1915 St. Louis Terriers season
- St. Louis Terriers all-time roster
