= H. Foster Bain =

American geologist

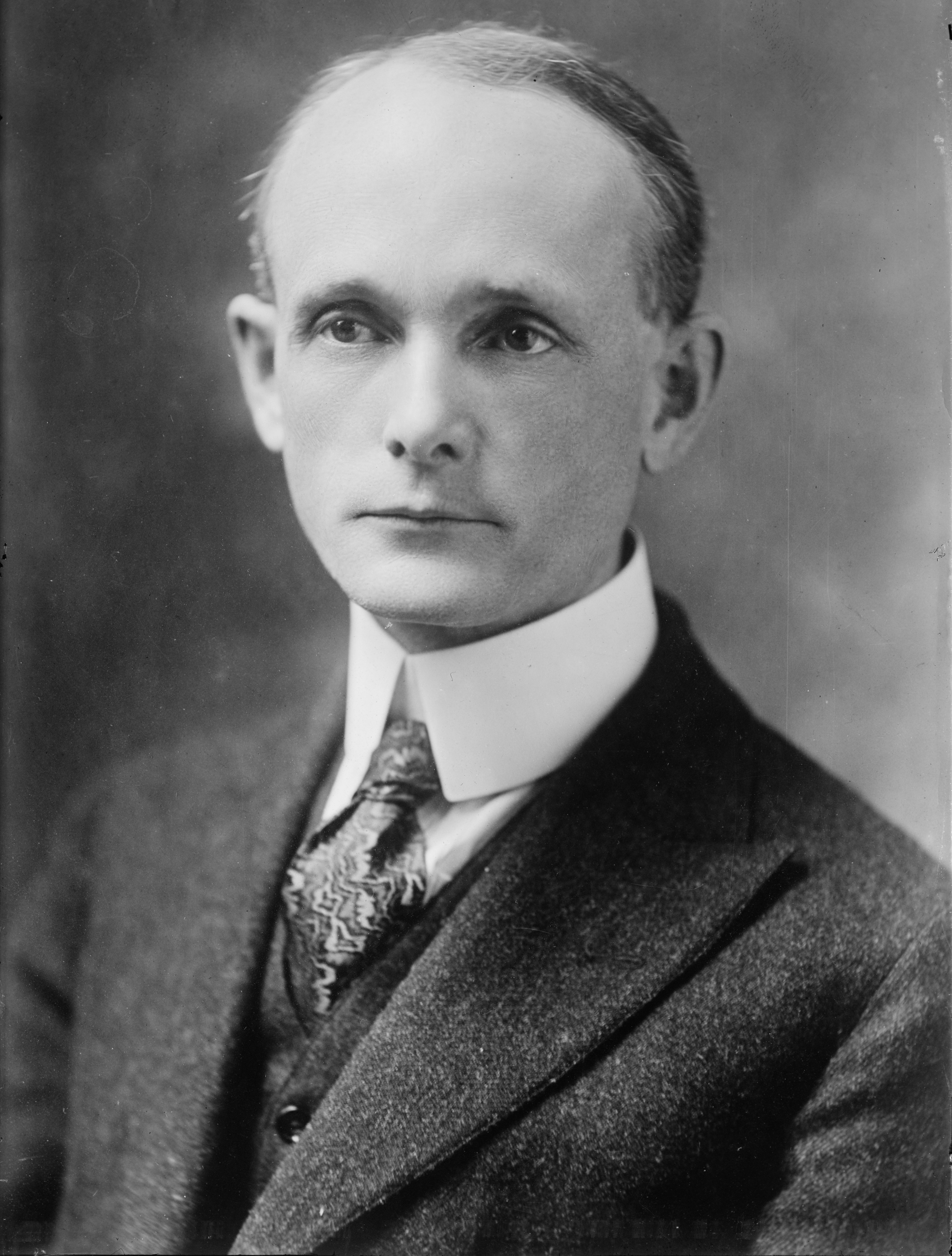

4th Director of the U.S. Bureau of Mines
- In office 1921–1924
- Preceded by: Frederick Gardner Cottrell
- Succeeded by: Scott Turner

Personal details
- Born: Harry Foster Bain; November 2, 1871 Seymour, Indiana, U.S.
- Died: March 9, 1948 (aged 76) Manila, Philippines
- Resting place: Atlantic Ocean, near Manila (buried at sea)
- Children: 1
- Education: Johns Hopkins University
- Alma mater: Moores Hill College; University of Chicago (PhD)
- Occupation: geologist; newspaper editor; consultant

Harry Foster Bain (November 2, 1871 – March 9, 1948), better known as H. Foster Bain, was an American geologist who served as the 4th Director of the U.S. Bureau of Mines.

== Early life ==
Harry Foster Bain was born in Seymour, Indiana, on November 2, 1871. Bain graduated from Moores Hill College in Moores Hill, Indiana, in 1890. He was a graduate student at Johns Hopkins University in geology and chemistry. He graduated from the University of Chicago with a PhD in June 1897.

== Career ==
=== Geological and mining career ===
Bain entered the Iowa Geological Survey in 1893 and was appointed the assistant state geologist of Iowa in 1894. He authored a number of county reports and eight papers on glacial and physiographic geology. He also published reports on coals of Arkansas and the Western Interior Coal Field. He was also lecturer on economic geology at the University of Iowa and the University of Chicago.

In 1900, Bain became president and manager of Dubuque Ore Concentrating Co. He then worked in mine examination in Colorado and for six months studied zinc fields in Missouri, Kansas, Arkansas and Oklahoma for the U.S. Geological Survey. In 1901, he became foreman and later assistant superintendent of the Franklin Mine in Idaho Springs, Colorado. In 1902, Bain became manager of Consolidated Franklin Mines Co. and assistant manager of Cripple Creek Mining Co. in Cripple Creek, Colorado He left in 1903 during the miners' strike of 1903.

In 1903, Bain joined the U.S. Geological Survey as a geologist. He published a series of reports on the fluorspar deposits of Kentucky and Illinois and the lead-zinc deposits of the Upper Mississippi Valley. He remained there until November 1905 when he was appointed director of the newly established Illinois State Geological Survey. While there, he worked to form a partnership with the U.S. Geological Survey and the Illinois State Geological Survey. He set up partnerships with local institutions and in 1906, called a meeting in Chicago to organize the Association of State Geologists of the Mississippi Valley, a group that would expand in two years to be the Association of American State Geologists. He remained with the Illinois State Geological Survey until 1909.

=== Editing career ===
Bain became an associate editor in New York of the Mining Magazine from 1904 to 1905 and in April 1909 he took over editorship of Mining and Scientific Press in San Francisco. He left San Francisco and moved to London to become editor of the Mining Magazine from 1915 to 1917. During that period, he assisted Herbert Hoover on the Commission for Relief in Belgium.

=== Later career ===
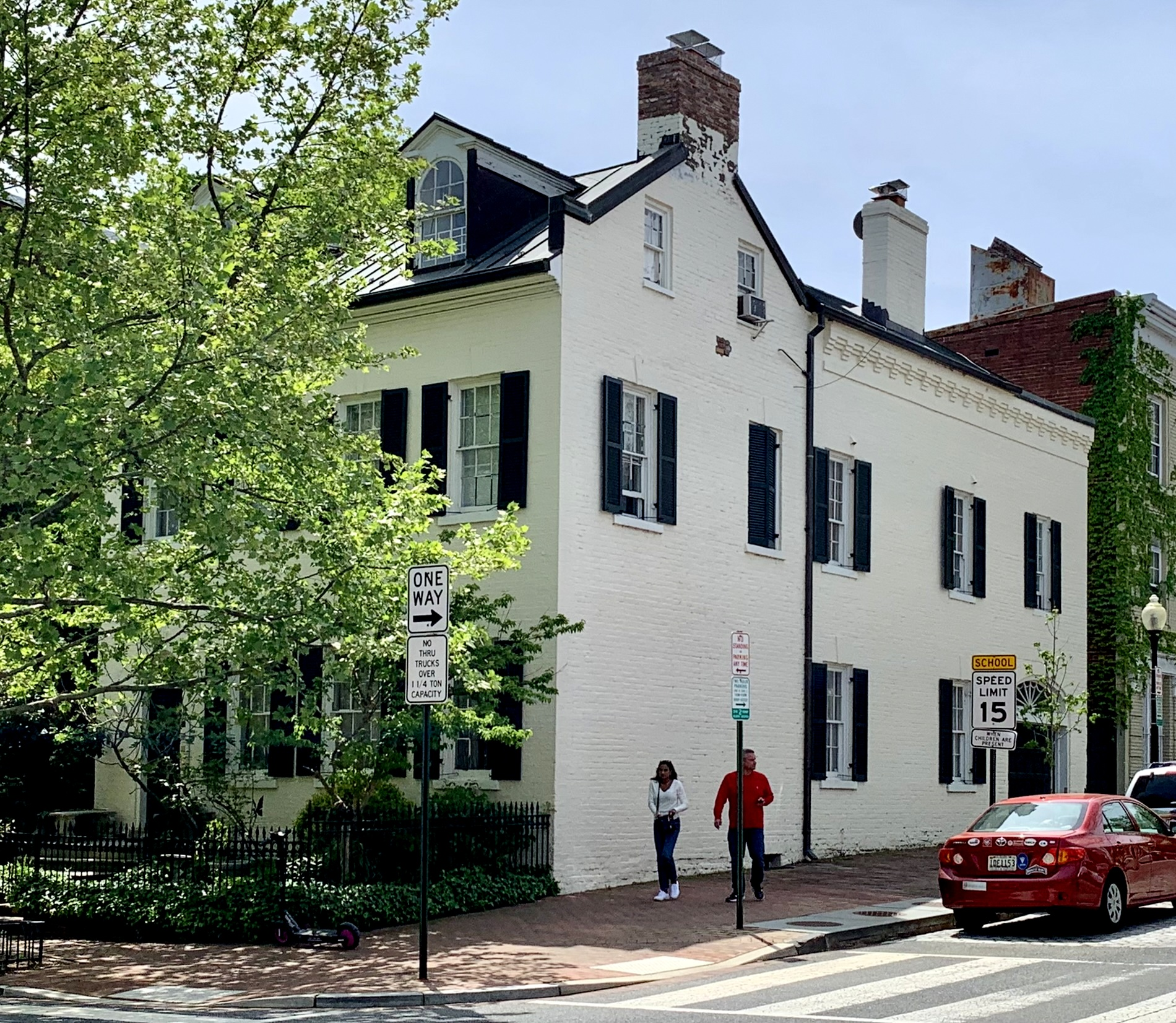
Bain's house in Washington, D.C.

After doing minerals exploration work in Africa and countries in the Far East from 1916 to 1920, Bain served as Assistant Director of the U.S. Bureau of Mines from 1918 to 1919 and as Director of the U.S. Bureau of Mines from 1921 to 1924. In 1925, he became Secretary of the American Institute of Mining and Metallurgical Engineers. He resigned in 1931 and traveled extensively.

In 1931, Bain was called as a witness for the defense during the Teapot Dome scandal. Bain in a letter made public at the trial argued that the Teapot Dome and Elk Hills naval oil reserves were leased "for the soundest technical reasons". He argued that he was the "principal agent" in negotiating the contracts and leases for Secretary of the Interior Albert B. Fall, and that "Fall did not make the decisions, though he approved our recommendations".

Bain was appointed as a consultant and technical adviser to the Philippines Bureau of Mines from 1936 to 1942. During World War II, in 1942 and 1943, he was imprisoned by the Japanese in a prison camp at the University of Santo Tomas in Manila for two years. He returned to the United States in 1943 on the MS Gripsholm and continued working.

== Personal life ==
Bain was married and had one daughter, Margaret.

== Later life and death ==
Bain established a ranch home in Steamboat Springs, Nevada. He returned to Manila for work and died from a sudden illness on March 9, 1948. He was cremated and his remains were spread near Manila.

== Awards ==
Bain received the King Albert Medal for his work as a member of the Commission for Relief in Belgium.
