= Haber (disambiguation) =

Haber is a surname.

Haber may also refer to:

== Science and technology ==
- 23804 Haber, minor planet
- Haber process, the method of synthesizing ammonia from hydrogen and nitrogen
- Haber (annelid), a genus of annelids in the family Naididae

== Other uses ==
- Ḥaber, Hebrew variant of chaber, Biblical term meaning "associate"; "colleague"; "fellow"; "companion"; "friend"
- Haber (film), a 2008 short-film depicting the work of Fritz Haber with the German army

== See also ==
- Born–Haber cycle, an approach to analyzing reaction energies
- Habertürk, former Turkish newspaper
