= Bobby Vaughn (baseball) =

American baseball player (1885-1965)

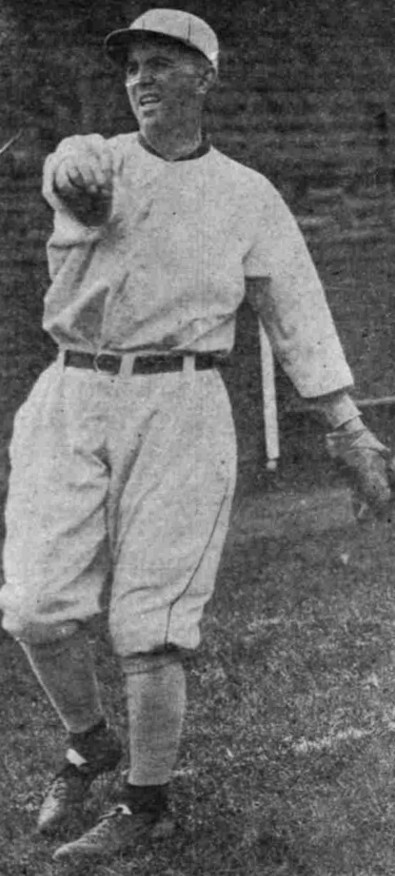
- Infielder
- Born: June 4, 1885; Stamford, New York, U.S.
- Died: April 11, 1965 (aged 79); Seattle, Washington, U.S.
- Batted: Right Threw: Right

MLB debut
- June 12, 1909, for the New York Highlanders

Last MLB appearance
- October 3, 1915, for the St. Louis Terriers

MLB statistics
- Batting average: .277
- Home runs: 0
- Hits: 148
- RBI: 32
- Stats at Baseball Reference

Teams
- New York Highlanders (1909); St. Louis Terriers (1915)

Robert Vaughn (June 4, 1885, in Stamford, New York – April 11, 1965) was an American professional baseball player who played a season for the New York Highlanders of the American League and a season for the St. Louis Terriers of the Federal League.

Vaughn played college baseball at Princeton University.

== Sources ==
- Career statistics from Baseball Reference · Baseball Reference (Minors) · Retrosheet · Baseball Almanac
