= Rupert Mills =

American baseball player (1892–1929)

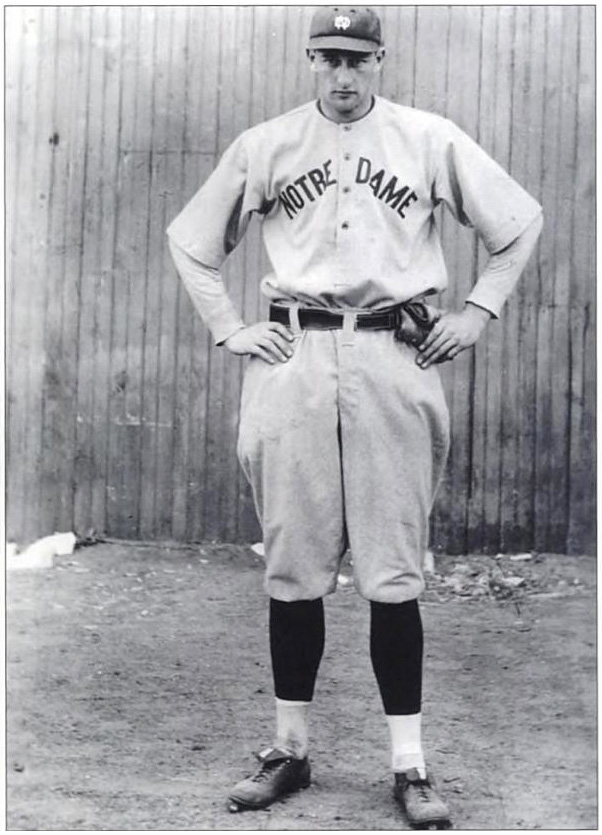
- First baseman
- Born: October 12, 1892; Newark, New Jersey, U.S.
- Died: July 20, 1929 (aged 36); Lake Hopatcong, New Jersey, U.S.
- Batted: Right Threw: Right

MLB debut
- July 23, 1915, for the Newark Peppers

Last MLB appearance
- October 3, 1915, for the Newark Peppers

MLB statistics
- Batting average: .201
- Home runs: 0
- Runs batted in: 16
- Stats at Baseball Reference

Teams
- Newark Peppers (1915)

Rupert Frank Mills (October 12, 1892 – July 20, 1929) was an American professional baseball player. He played part of one season in Major League Baseball for the 1915 Newark Peppers of the now-defunct Federal League, primarily as a first baseman. He batted .201 in 41 games for the Peppers.

Born in Newark, New Jersey, Mills attended Barringer High School and the University of Notre Dame, where he studied law. At Notre Dame he starred in football, baseball, basketball and track.

Mills was the only native-born Jerseyan on the Peppers' squad. Thanks to his law education, he signed an "ironclad" two-year contract with the Peppers. Though the team disbanded after the 1915 season, Mills "played" the non-existent 1916 "season." A clause in his 1915 contract guaranteed him a salary the following year as long as he continued to show up at the park, suited and ready to play for the team. Mills fulfilled his contractual obligations, coming to the empty park each day at 9 a.m., donning his uniform, and performing a rigorous physical workout to remain in playing condition. Partway through the summer, former team co-owner Patrick Powers bought out the balance of Mills' contract, after which Mills signed with a minor league club in Harrisburg, Pennsylvania that was affiliated with the Detroit Tigers. He batted .256 in 70 games.

In 1917 he played with the minor league Denver Bears of the Western League, leading the circuit in games played (149), doubles (37), assists (75) and fielding percentage (.987).

In 1918 he enlisted in the U.S. military and during World War I served in France as lieutenant with the 11th field artillery division. Upon military discharge, he entered local politics and served as Undersheriff of Essex County, New Jersey.

On July 20, 1929, Mills was canoeing with former New Jersey state assemblyman Louis Freeman on Lake Hopatcong, when the boat capsized. Freeman could not swim, but Mills rescued him. While passing Freeman's unconscious body to people on shore, Mills suffered a heart attack and drowned. At the time of his death, he was campaigning as the Republican candidate for Sheriff of Essex County.
