= Ted Reed =

American baseball player

- Third baseman
- Born: October 18, 1890; Beaver, Pennsylvania, U.S.
- Died: February 16, 1959 (aged 68); Beaver, Pennsylvania, U.S.
- Batted: Right Threw: Right

MLB debut
- September 10, 1915, for the Newark Pepper

Last MLB appearance
- September 27, 1915, for the Newark Pepper

MLB statistics
- Batting average: .260
- Home runs: 0
- Hits: 20
- RBI: 4
- Stats at Baseball Reference

Teams
- Newark Pepper (1915)

Ralph Edwin Reed (October 18, 1890 – February 16, 1959) was an American professional third baseman who played for the Newark Pepper of the Federal League in its 1915 season.

Reed was born in Beaver, Pennsylvania. He played college baseball at both Dartmouth College and Princeton University.

== Sources ==
- Career statistics from Baseball Reference · Baseball Reference (Minors) · Retrosheet · Baseball Almanac
