= Frederick Gardner Cottrell =

American physical chemist, inventor and philanthropist

- Cottrell, c. 1910–1920

3rd Director of the U.S. Bureau of Mines
- In office 1920–1920
- Preceded by: Van H. Manning
- Succeeded by: H. Foster Bain

Personal details
- Born: January 10, 1877 Oakland, California, U.S.
- Died: November 16, 1948 (aged 71) Berkeley, California, U.S.
- Spouse: Jessie Mae Fulton (m. 1904)
- Children: 2
- Education: University of California, Berkeley; University of Berlin; Leipzig University (PhD)
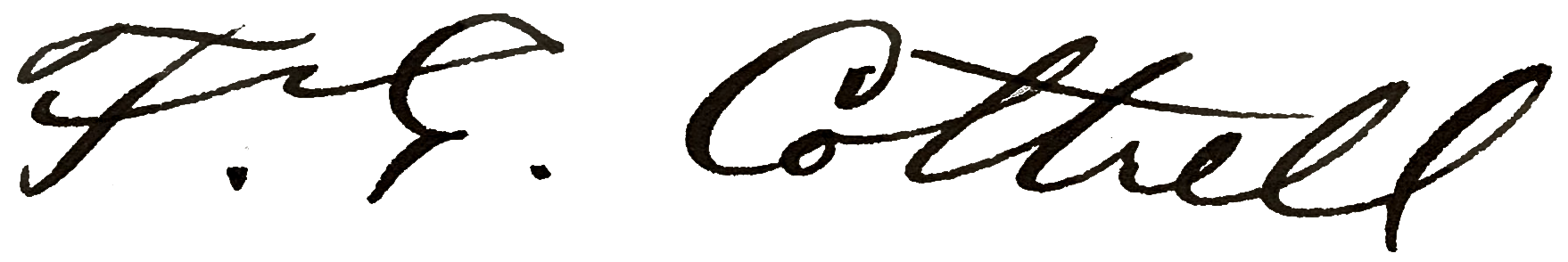
- Signature

Frederick Gardner Cottrell (January 10, 1877 – November 16, 1948) was an American physical chemist, inventor and philanthropist. He is best known for his invention of the electrostatic precipitator, one of the first inventions designed to eliminate air pollution—and for establishing the Research Corporation for Science Advancement, a foundation that has funded scientific research since 1912.

== Biography ==
He was born on January 10, 1877, in Oakland, California, to Cynthia (née Durfee) and Henry Cottrell, both prominent families going back to the settlement of America.

Cottrell's immense curiosity gained him notice early in life. One acquaintance said, “He read textbooks like novels.” He finished high school at age 16, entered the University of California, Berkeley, and graduated in 3 years. After graduation, he taught chemistry at Oakland High School, saving money (his annual salary was $1,200) until he could afford to continue his formal education. A notation in his diary, dated January 15, 1900, reads: “Week for lunch and yard duty at school.”

At the time, it was common for American scientists to conduct their graduate studies abroad. To that end, Cottrell left for Europe in July 1900 on the German steamer Waesland and made land in England where he visited the “Cavendish labs…Hyde Park, Kensington Gardens, House of Parliament, Westminster Abbey and the Crystal Palace” in London; and “the Bodleian Library, Sheldonian Theatre and the Ashmolean Museum of Art and Archaeology” in Oxford.

Then he went to Paris where he visited the Exposition Universelle, the 1900 world's fair designed to celebrate the achievements of the past century and to accelerate development into the next. There, Cottrell saw the new Eiffel Tower (“[went] to summit”), and visited “Old Paris.” His diary entry on August 11 notes: “got up at 5 a.m. on account of bed bugs. Shook out and packed up things and made arrangements… to change room.”

From Paris, Cottrell traveled to Berlin where he began his studies at University of Berlin with Jacobus Henricus van 't Hoff, receiving an advanced degree in 1901. The following year, van’t Hoff was awarded the first-ever Nobel Prize in chemistry “in recognition of the extraordinary services he has rendered by the discovery of the laws of chemical dynamics and osmotic pressure in solutions.”

Cottrell then moved to Leipzig University where he studied with Wilhelm Ostwald, undertaking a theoretical study of the effect of the counterflow of an electrolyte on the migration of ions through a diaphragm in an electrolytic cell. A month after his arrival in Leipzig, Cottrell wrote to his future wife, Jessie Fulton, “My old-time enthusiasm, which during my Berlin stay may sometimes have waned a little, is coming back in full force and I find I have about twice to four times as many schemes to try as there is possibly time for. The change is mainly due, I think, to my being turned loose once more on my own work and being thrown in contact with a large number of men with diverse ideas.” For his work with Ostwald, Cottrell earned a Ph.D. in 1902. Ostwald received the Nobel Prize in Chemistry in 1909.

Cottrell struggled with learning new languages. In France, his efforts to speak French were often met with blank stares. Although his German became good enough to study with German scientists, and to write his dissertation, he was far from fluent. Inspired no doubt by Ostwald (who studied Esperanto, and backed another constructed language, Ido, by donating the proceeds of his Nobel Prize for its support), Cottrell became interested in the movement to establish a universal language for speakers of different linguistic backgrounds. In 1924, he was one of the founders of the International Auxiliary Language Association.

Degrees in hand, Cottrell returned to California and began teaching at University of California, Berkeley. On New Year's Day 1904, he married Jessie Mae Fulton, a former high-school classmate he had met in botany class. Jessie was shy and frail, a sharp contrast to Cottrell's bounding enthusiasm and unending energy. When he proposed, Cottrell declared his love, with the proviso, “but my work comes first.” After two difficult pregnancies and the loss of two children, they settled into a quiet, solitary life. They enjoyed reading aloud to one another, travel, and attending lectures and theatre performances.

In 1917 Cottrell was initiated into the Sigma chapter of Alpha Chi Sigma at the University of California at Berkeley.

== Career ==
Shortly after returning to Berkeley, Cottrell began consulting for the DuPont Company at its explosives- and acids-producing facility near Pinole, California, 20 miles north of the University. DuPont wanted to address the problem of precipitating the acid mists which form when sulfur trioxide is bubbled through water or dilute sulfuric acid. Using an electrical method similar to one envisioned by Sir Oliver Lodge in England, Cottrell began experimenting with electrostatic precipitation as a means of collecting sulfuric acid mists. The result of Cottrell's work was the electrostatic precipitator, a device which could collect fly ash, dust and fumes, acid mists and fogs that spewed from turn-of-the century plants, and which became a primary means for controlling industrial air pollution. Cottrell made it work by developing a reliable high-voltage power supply and electrodes that permitted electrical energy to leak across a gas-filled chamber from many small points. In 1906, electric current was applied to a small laboratory device emitting sulfuric acid mist, and the concept became a reality. The first patent, No. 895,729, was issued on August 11, 1908. The electrostatic precipitator remains a principal technology for pollutant removal from industrial waste flows to this day.

Cottrell was not a businessman, but he recognized the business potential of his invention and decided to use it to fund scientific research through the creation of Research Corporation. In the time before science was routinely funded by government and private sources, Cottrell, at the age of 34, resolved that science would be the principal beneficiary of his invention. Those associated with him in developing electrostatic precipitation agreed with this highly unusual suggestion, and Cottrell made several attempts to donate the patent to organizations that might market the precipitator, using the proceeds to finance scientific research. After the University of California and the Smithsonian Institution declined his offer, Cottrell worked with then-Secretary of the Smithsonian Charles Doolittle Walcott, to form Research Corporation, a foundation devoted to philanthropy in science. The original board of directors—academics, scientists, lawyers and bankers—invested a total of $10,100 to fund the fledgling organization, and served without compensation. The board of directors shared Cottrell's goal of acquiring inventions and patents, developing them, making them available to industry under licensing, and applying all profits to support investigations in fundamental scientific research. Within a year, all of the board's investments had been repaid and the precipitator business was under way. Cottrell is perhaps best known for this act of philanthropy.

Cottrell's belief in public service and his love of the environment prompted him to join the U.S. Bureau of Mines in 1911. At that time, the Bureau of Mines was the primary U.S. Government agency conducting scientific research on mineral resources. Starting out by establishing an office in San Francisco, Cottrell served the bureau in several capacities, including that of director in Washington, D.C. Experimental work on helium production for use in balloons and dirigibles began in 1917 at the U.S. Bureau of Mines, with Cottrell playing a vital role in making helium production financially feasible during World War I. The cost of a cubic foot of helium at that time was $1,700, making it prohibitive for use in World War I. In 1920, Cottrell's search for an inexpensive process for recovering helium from oil well gases resulted in its commercial availability at a cost as low as 1 cent per cubic foot.

In 1921, Cottrell left the Bureau of Mines to chair the Chemistry and Chemical Technology Division of the National Research Council. From 1922 to 1930, he was director of the Fixed Nitrogen Research Laboratory at the U.S. Department of Agriculture. During his tenure, the department developed a working catalyst for a Haber-type process. Cottrell was responsible for recommending what to do with the nitrogen plant erected by the government at Muscle Shoals on the Tennessee River during World War I. After the war, production had been converted from explosives to fertilizer manufacturing and Cottrell's recommendation that the government continue to operate it as an experimental facility was ultimately incorporated in the plans for the Tennessee Valley Authority. After resigning his position with the Department of Agriculture in 1930, he remained a consultant to the department for the next decade.

As a science consultant, Cottrell was highly regarded in national and international circles, in industry and the academic community. He traveled widely, was acquainted with scientists in the U.S. and abroad, and was especially well known for his ability to identify and contribute to new ideas. Cottrell declined any role at Research Corporation as an officer or director, but remained active as an adviser for the rest of his life. Many of Research Corporation's early grants were made to scientists who Cottrell had identified as “movers and shakers” in their fields, among them Ernest O. Lawrence (the cyclotron), Isidor Rabi (nuclear magnetic resonance) and Robert Van de Graaff (the Van de Graaff generator).

Another Cottrell “brainchild” was Research Associates Inc. which was organized January 1, 1935, with 10 employees and offices on the campus of American University in Washington D.C. Funded by “grants” from Research Corporation, Research Associates represented an effort by Cottrell to create another Research Corporation which would, in time, become self-supporting through returns for its services and products. Among its projects were Brackett headlights, detergents, heat wave roasting of Fullers earth, the Greger fuel cell and Royster stoves and deodorizers.

In an obituary he wrote at the time of Cottrell's death in 1948, Vannevar Bush recalled: “The purpose of [Research Associates] was to conduct scientific and social research and to eliminate as far as possible the time lag between the perfection of scientific ideas and their introduction into the national life. The period of Research Associates’ activity, from 1935 through 1938, was a most stimulating one.”

For many reasons, the organization eventually floundered. In a letter dated September 18, 1951, J.W. Barker, then-president of Research Corporation, discussed:

“...the main problem at Research Associates, Inc.–the complete inability of this brilliant heterogeneous group of prima donnas to stick sufficiently long on any line of investigation to determine either that it would or would not work. It seemed as if the moment any particular experiment was started everyone, including Cottrell particularly, lost all interest in that experiment. Sparks began flying about some other experiment and dropping the older one without any specific determinations, off they would go after the new spark.”

Throughout his life, Cottrell had suffered periods of depression. The failure of Research Associates resulted in a long, difficult depression and marked a decline in Cottrell’s previously unbounded fervor and enthusiasm.

Cottrell’s longtime interest in nitrogen fixation prompted a collaboration with Farrington Daniels of the University of Wisconsin, beginning in 1939. Daniels and associates were trying to develop a thermal process for nitrogen fixation using a regenerative pebble-bed furnace, which they hoped would be an inexpensive alternative to the Haber ammonia synthesis. Although the project helped rejuvenate Cottrell emotionally, the development of the process was not complete until after Cottrell’s death.

By the time the United States entered World War II, Cottrell was 64 years old. His health was declining and his mind was weary. In 1944, he and Jess bought a house in Palo Alto, California and retired. Jessie Cottrell died in February 1948.

On November 16, 1948, Research Corporation’s founder, Frederick Gardner Cottrell, died while attending a meeting of the National Academy of Sciences held at his alma mater, the University of California at Berkeley.

The following obituary subsequently ran in the “Milestones” section of the November 29, 1948, issue of Time magazine:

Died. Dr. Frederick Gardner Cottrell, 71, California-born chemist and inventor (Cottrell Electrical Precipitator); of a heart ailment; in Berkeley, Calif. Dr. Cottrell founded the famed Research Corporation in 1912 as a nonprofit organization for the advancement of science, authorized it to spend the entire $3,500,000 grossed by his invention.

Although Cottrell was gone, the Foundation carried on his inspiration. In 2012, Research Corporation for Science Advancement celebrated 100 years of funding early-career teacher-scholars at America's leading colleges and universities. Shortly before his death, Cottrell said, “Bet on the youngsters. They are long shots, but some of them pay off.” His investment has financed thousands of scientific research projects, many of which have changed our world.

== Honors and awards ==
- 1919 Perkin Medal of the Society of Chemical Industry
- 1920 Willard Gibbs Medal
- 1924 Gold Medal of the American Institute of Mining, Metallurgical, and Petroleum Engineers
- 1937 Holley Medal of the American Society of Mechanical Engineers
- 1938 American Institute of Chemists Gold Medal
- 1939 National Academy of Sciences
- 1982 Alpha Chi Sigma Hall of Fame
- 1992 National Inventors Hall of Fame

== Patents ==
- U.S. patent 866,843 – Manufacture of sulfuric acid, 1907
- U.S. patent 895,729 – Art of separating suspended particles from gaseous bodies [electrostatic precipitator], 1908
- U.S. patent 945,917 – Effecting interchange of electric charges between solid conductors and gases, 1910
- U.S. patent 987,114 – Process for separating and collecting particles of one liquid suspended in another liquid, 1911
- U.S. patent 1,016,476 – Purification of gases, 1912
- U.S. patent 1,035,422 – Apparatus for separating suspended particles from gaseous bodies, 1912
- U.S. patent 1,067,974 – Method of discharge of electricity into gases, 1913

== See also ==
- Cottrell equation
- Electrostatic precipitator
- Research Corporation for Science Advancement
- 2026 Cottrell
