= Haber =

Haber is a surname of German origin. The meaning in old German is "oat". The cereal is now in German called Hafer. Notable people with this surname include:

- Alan Haber (born 1936), American student activist
- Alessandro Haber (born 1947), Italian actor, director, and singer
- Alicia Haber (born 1946), Uruguayan historian, art critic, curator, and teacher
- Bernard Haber (1920–1959), American politician from New York
- Brett Haber, American sportscaster
- Daniel A. Haber, French oncologist
- Daniel Haber (soccer) (born 1992), Canadian soccer player
- Eitan Haber (1940–2020), Israeli journalist
- Fritz Haber (1868–1934), German chemist and Nobel Prize winner
- Heinz Haber (1913–1990), German physicist and science writer
- Howard E. Haber (born 1952), American physicist
- James Haber (born 1943), American biochemist
- Justin Haber (born 1981), Maltese footballer
- Leonard Haber (1933–2015), American politician and radio show host
- Leonard V. Haber (1914–1994), American industrial designer
- Marco Haber (born 1971), German footballer
- Marcus Haber (born 1989), Canadian soccer player
- Peter Haber (born 1952), Swedish actor
- Ralf Haber (born 1962), German hammer thrower
- Shamai Haber (1922–1995), sculptor
- Stephen Haber (born 1957), American Political Scientist
- Yaacov Haber, American rabbi
- Yvonne Haber, Australian architect
