= Cleveland Green Sox =

Information
- Location: Cleveland, Ohio
- Founded: 1913
- Disbanded: 1913
- League championships: None
- Former league: Federal League (1913)
- Former ballpark: Luna Park
- Colors: Forest Green, Cream and Black
- Ownership: Matthew Bramley
- Manager: Cy Young

The Cleveland Green Sox were a baseball club based in Cleveland, Ohio. In 1913, the "Green Sox" became charter members of the Federal League. The Cleveland Green Sox were managed by Baseball Hall of Fame member Cy Young and played the 1913 season before the franchise was folded in a territorial battle. Finishing in second place, the 1913 Green Sox hosted Federal League home games at Luna Park.

The Green Sox franchise was ultimately forced out in Cleveland when the major league Cleveland Naps relocated their affiliate, the Toledo Mud Hens to Cleveland for the 1914 season and forced the Federal League to forfeit the team in Cleveland.

== History ==
In 1912, baseball promoter John T. Powers formed an independent professional league known as the Columbian League. However, the withdrawal of one of the organization's primary investors caused the league to fail before ever playing a game. Undaunted, Powers tried again the following year, creating a new league with teams in Chicago, Cleveland, Pittsburgh, Indianapolis, St. Louis, and Covington, Kentucky. He named the organization the Federal League, and served as its first president.

Because it did not abide by the National Agreement on player payment in place in organized baseball, the Federal League was called an "outlaw league" by its competitors. The Federal League's "outlaw" status allowed it to recruit players from established clubs, and it attracted many current and former players from the major as well as minor leagues. Powers initially served as president, but he was soon replaced by James A. Gilmore.

The 1913 Federal League began play as a six–team minor league. The Cleveland franchise was named the Green Sox. Cleveland joined the Chicago Whales, Covington Blue Sox, Indianapolis Hoosiers, Pittsburgh Filipinos and St. Louis Terriers in beginning Federal League play on May 4, 1913.

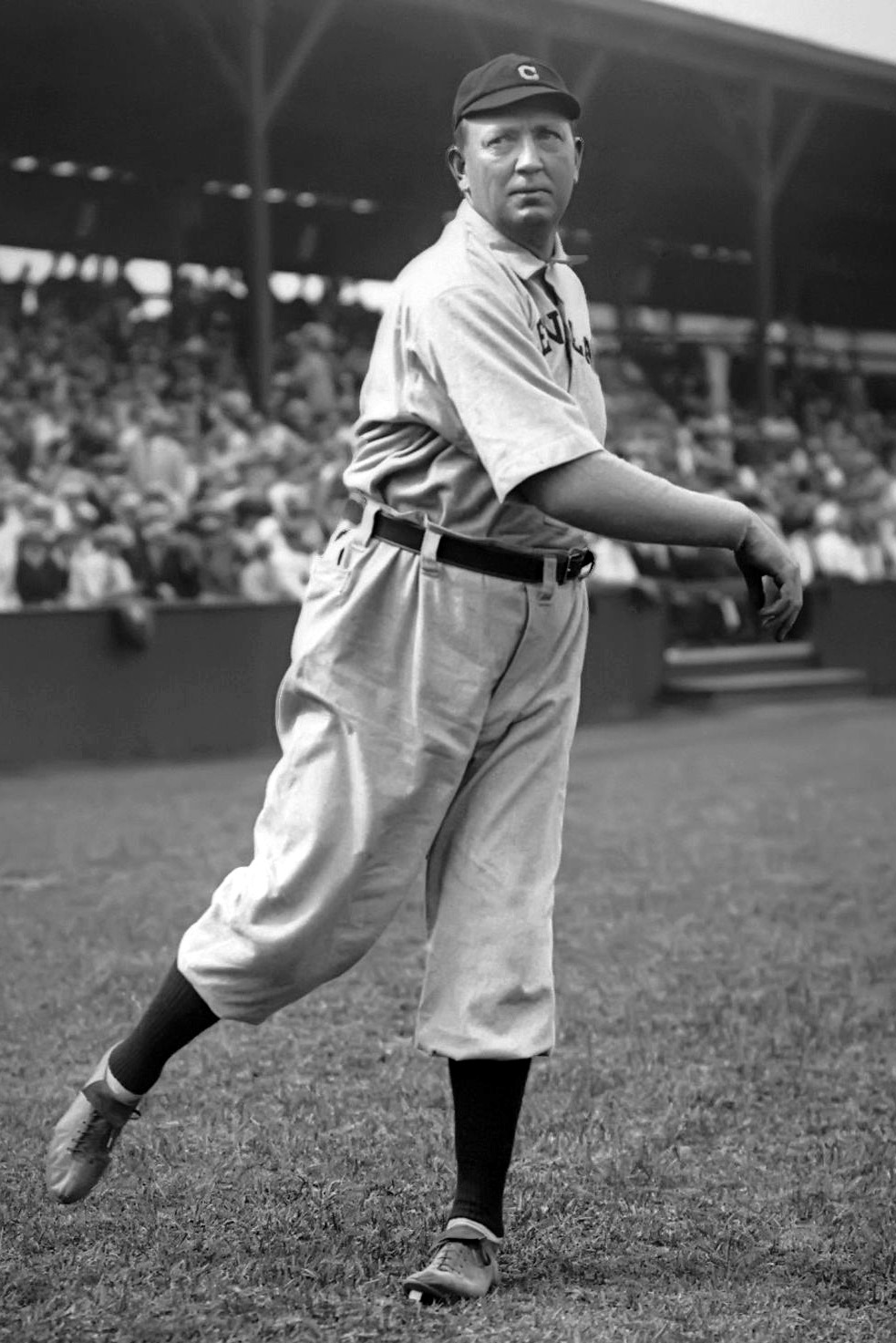
(1911) Cy Young, Cleveland Naps. Young pitched his final season for Cleveland in 1911. After his retirement as a player, Young managed the 1913 Cleveland Green Sox, in what became his final season in professional baseball.

The Cleveland Green Sox became the second baseball team in Cleveland, behind the American League's Cleveland Naps, today's Cleveland Guardians. The 1913 Green Sox were managed by the legendary pitcher Cy Young, namesake of the Cy Young Award. The Green Sox' franchise owner was Matthew Bramley, who was president of the local Cleveland Trinidad Paving Company, which at the time was the largest paving company in the world. The league played a 120-game inaugural season.

The Cleveland Green Sox hosted the very first Federal League game. The Federal League opener was held at Cleveland's Luna Park against the Covington Blue Sox.

In their only season of play, the 1913 Cleveland Green Sox finished in second place in the six–team Federal League standings. Cleveland ended the season with a 64–54 record, finishing 10.0 games behind the first place Indianapolis Hoosiers. The league held no playoffs. For the 46–year–old Cy Young, the 1913 season was his final managing position after a 511-win pitching career.

During the 1913 Federal League season, Gilmore replaced Powers as league president. The Federal League franchises, Cleveland included, were struggling financially and there was consideration given to folding the league. Gilmore convinced the league owners to continue the 1913 league and to play again in 1914. Gilmore aligned the Federal League with wealthy owners in Chicago, St. Louis and Brooklyn, but Cleveland was struggling being in the same city with the major league Cleveland Naps. Three other original Federal League franchises (St. Louis, Pittsburgh, Chicago) were in the same position of having to share their market. The Green Sox ended 1913 with financial losses.

Cleveland Green Sox owner Matthew Bramley had plans for the 1914 Cleveland Green Sox that never materialized. Bramley had an option for a piece of property on Euclid Avenue between East 47th and East 49th streets as a site for a new ballpark. But the financial obligations of building a new stadium, coupled with a Federal League franchise fee were major financial obstacles.

After the 1913 season, Cleveland did not return for the Federal League's 1914 season. Besides finances, a final factor was another team coming to Cleveland for the 1914 season. On February 16, 1914, Cleveland Naps owner Charles Somers formally announced that the minor league Toledo Mud Hens of the American Association (owned by Somers) were relocating to Cleveland to share League Park with the Cleveland Naps. This move was made by Somers to compete with the Federal League potential presence in Cleveland. With the new Cleveland Spiders being established as the second team in Cleveland, Bramley and the Federal League folded the 1914 Cleveland Green Sox franchise. The Green Sox were subsequently sold to Bernard Hepburn, who moved the franchise to Toronto, Ontario. There, the franchise became the Toronto Beavers playing in the 1914 Class B level Canadian League. The Federal League played as an eight–team major league in 1914, before permanently folding after the 1915 season amidst an antitrust lawsuit that eventually went to the Supreme Court of the United States.

== The ballpark ==
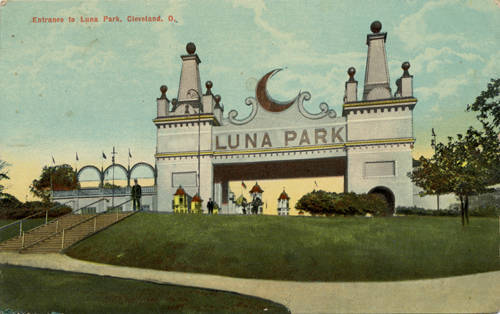
(1910) Luna Park entrance. Cleveland, Ohio.

The 1913 Cleveland Green Sox reportedly played home games at Luna Park. Luna Park had been owned since 1908 by Green Sox owner Matthew Bramley. Luna Park was an amusement park and sports facility that was located on the east side of Cleveland in the Woodland Hills neighborhood. Luna Park opened in 1904. There was a chain of Luna Park amusement parks throughout the country, all built and opened by Frederick Ingersoll, owner of the Ingersoll Construction Company. Bramley purchased Luna Park from Frederick Ingersoll. The Cleveland Luna Park grew to include a 20,000 seat football field called the "Luna Bowl" and a baseball field.

After the Green Sox, Negro league baseball teams Cleveland Stars (1932), Cleveland Giants (1933), and Cleveland Red Sox (1934) also played at Luna Park. The short lived 1912 Cleveland Forest City club of the United States Baseball League had used Luna Park the year before the Green Sox. Luna Park was located on a 35-acre site bordered by Woodhill Road, East 110th Street, Woodland Avenue, and Ingersoll Avenue. Luna Park was greatly affected by the depression and prohibition, closing in 1938. Later, the site became home of the Woodhill Homes housing development, which was built in stages in the 1940's and still exists today.

== Timeline ==
Year(s)	# Yrs.	Team	Level	League	Ballpark
1913	1	Cleveland Green Sox	Independent	Federal League	Luna Park

== Year-by-year record ==
Year	Record	Finish	Manager	Playoffs/Notes
1913	64–54	2nd	Cy Young	No playoffs held

== Notable alumni ==
- Cy Young (1913, MGR) Inducted Baseball Hall of Fame, 1937
- Bill Bartley (1913)
- Gil Britton (1913)
- Harry Juul (1913)
- Red Kleinow (1913)
- John Potts (1913)
- Frank Rooney (1913)

- Cleveland Green Sox players
