= Fred Trautman =

American baseball player (1892-1964)

- Pitcher
- Born: March 24, 1892; Bucyrus, Ohio, U.S.
- Died: February 15, 1964 (aged 71); Bucyrus, Ohio, U.S.
- Batted: Right Threw: Right

MLB debut
- April 27, 1919, for the Newark Peppers

Last MLB appearance
- April 27, 1919, for the Newark Peppers

MLB statistics
- Win–loss record: 0-0
- Earned run average: 6.00
- Strikeouts: 2
- Stats at Baseball Reference

Teams
- Newark Peppers (1915)

Fredrick Orlando Trautman (March 24, 1892 – February 15, 1964) was an American Major League Baseball pitcher, who appeared in one game for the 1915 Newark Peppers of the defunct Federal League. Trautman was born in Bucyrus, Ohio and died there in 1964.
