= Walt Justis =

American baseball player (1883–1941)

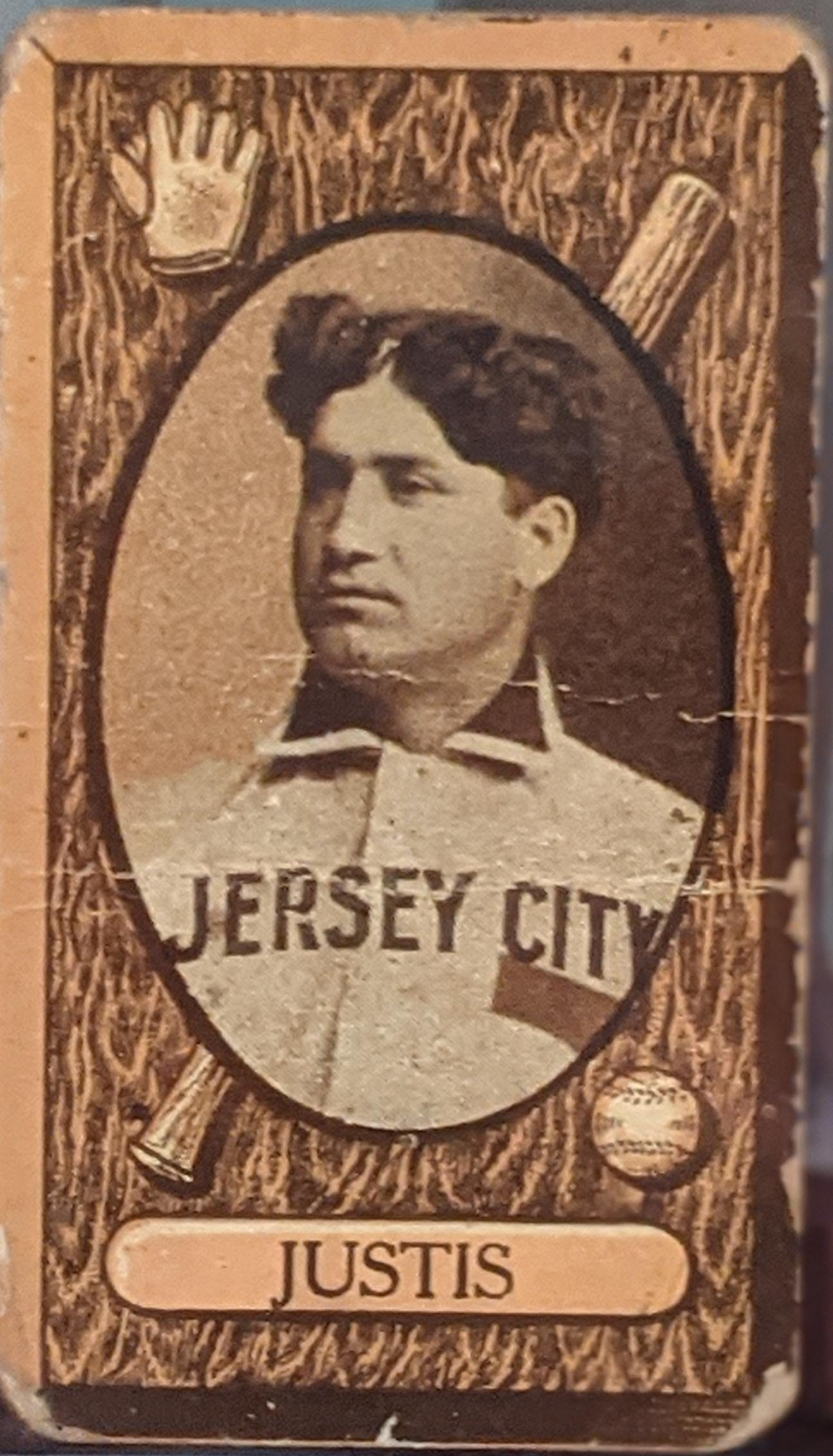
- Pitcher
- Born: August 17, 1883; Moores Hill, Indiana, U.S.
- Died: October 4, 1941 (aged 58); Greendale, Indiana, U.S.
- Batted: Right Threw: Right

MLB debut
- July 12, 1905, for the Detroit Tigers

Last MLB appearance
- August 1, 1905, for the Detroit Tigers

MLB statistics
- Win–loss record: 0–0
- Earned run average: 8.10
- Strikeouts: 0
- Stats at Baseball Reference

Teams
- Detroit Tigers (1905)

Walter Newton Justis (August 17, 1883 – October 4, 1941), nicknamed "Smoke", was an American Major League Baseball pitcher who played in 1905 with the Detroit Tigers. He batted and threw right-handed. Justis had a 0–0 record, with an 8.10 ERA, in 2 games, in his one-year career.

He spent several years playing professional ball in various minor leagues. In 1908, he set a still-standing minor league record by pitching four no-hitters for the Lancaster Lanks. In 1913, his last season, he famously threw a shutout to win the home opener for the premiere season of the Covington Blue Sox at Federal Park (two blocks from where a sports bar now carries his namesake).

He was born in Moores Hill, Indiana, and died in Greendale, Indiana.
