= C. C. Madison =

American baseball executive

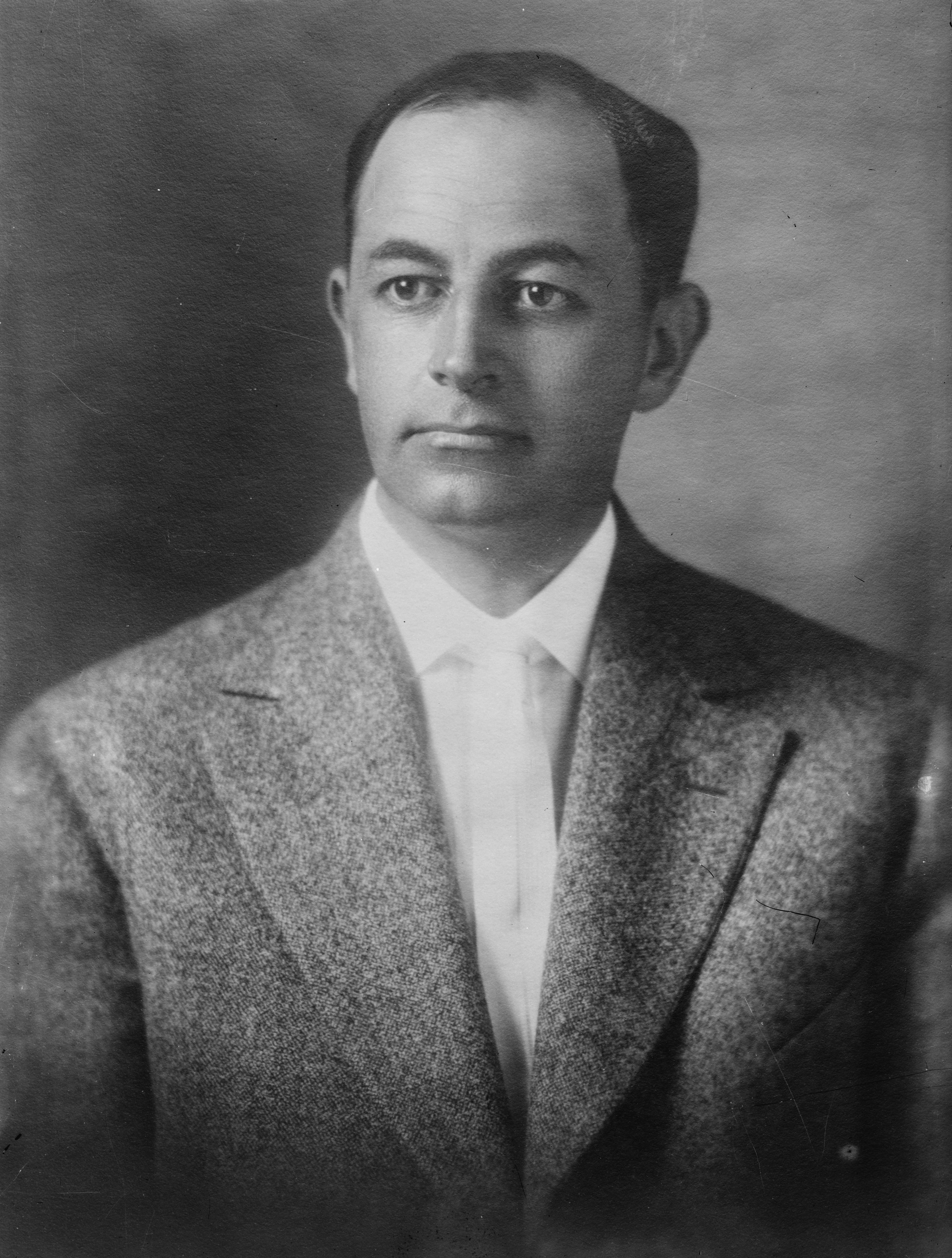
Madison in 1915. He was the president of the Kansas City, Missouri baseball club of the Federal League, the Kansas City Packers.

Charles Clarence Madison (October 10, 1878 – August 31, 1957) was an American lawyer who was the United States attorney for the Western District of Missouri. He was a baseball enthusiast who was owner of the Kansas City Packers of the Federal League.

Madison was born in Corning, Missouri. His father, William S. Madison, was a third cousin of James Madison.
