= Moores Hill United Methodist Church =

Historic church in Indiana, United States

- Moore's Hill United Methodist Church
- U.S. National Register of Historic Places
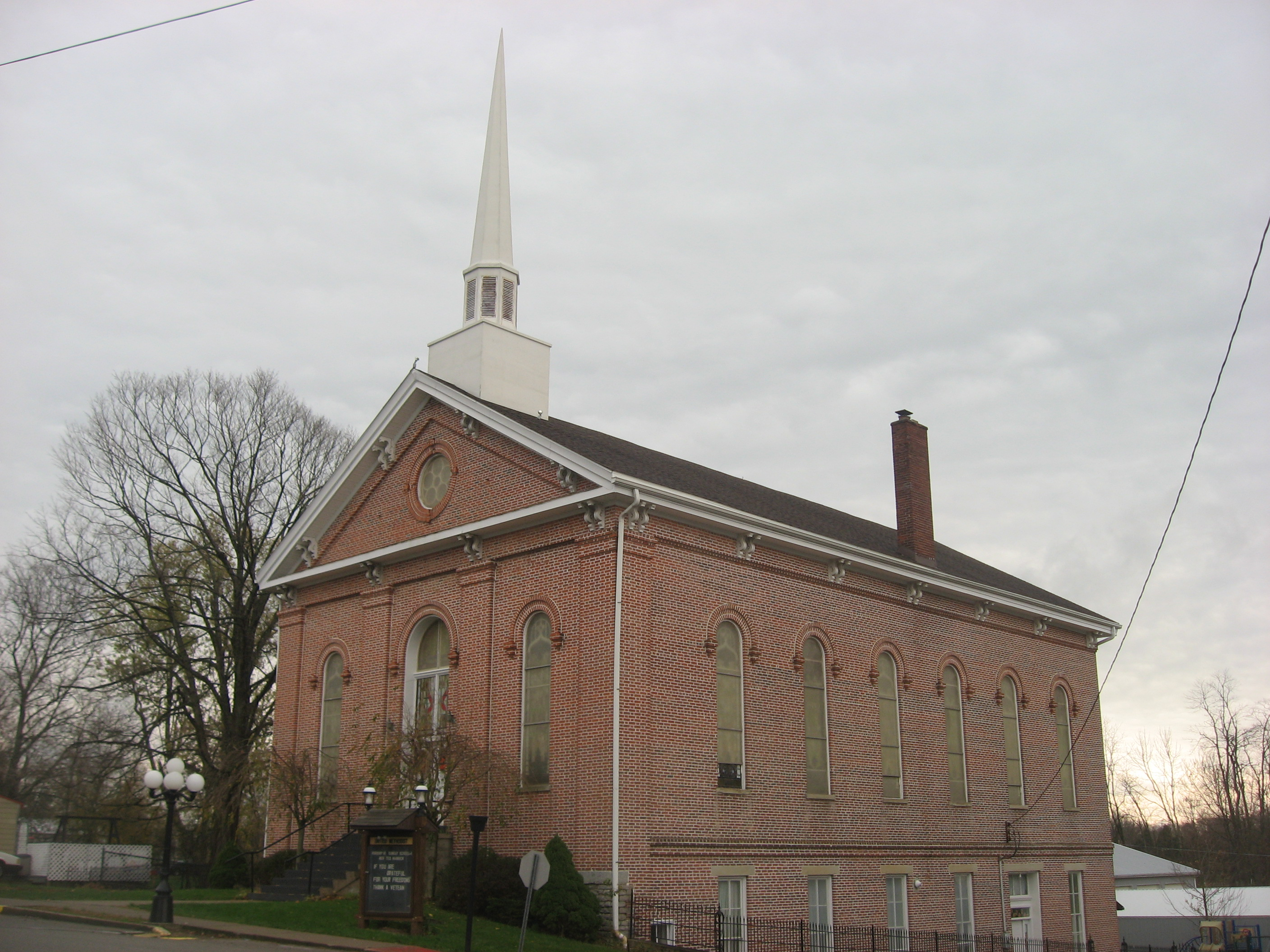

- Location within Indiana Location within the United States
- Location: 14476 Main St., Moores Hill, Indiana
- Coordinates: 39°6′47″N 85°5′16″W
- Area: less than one acre
- Built: 1871
- Built by: Boyd, B.C.
- Architectural style: Greek Revival, Italianate
- NRHP reference No.: 97001537
- Added to NRHP: December 15, 1997

Moore's Hill United Methodist Church, also known as Methodist Episcopal Church, is a historic Methodist church located at 13476 Main Street in Moores Hill, Indiana. Although it was built in 1871, the congregation was founded in 1818. It is a simple one-story, gable front, brick building with Greek Revival and Italianate style design elements. It rests on a limestone foundation and has four Doric order pilasters on the front facade.

It was added to the National Register of Historic Places in 1997.

Due to declining membership, the church shut down in 2020 and is now run by Abundant Grace Bible Fellowship, a local non-denominational ministry.
