= 2026 Cottrell =

Main-belt asteroid

Discovery
- Discovered by: Indiana University (Indiana Asteroid Program)
- Discovery site: Goethe Link Obs.
- Discovery date: 30 March 1955

Designations
- Named after: Frederick Gardner Cottrell (American chemist)
- Alternative designations: 1955 FF · 1951 EL_{1} 1972 TE_{1}
- Minor planet category: main-belt · (inner)

Orbital characteristics
- Epoch 4 September 2017 (JD 2458000.5)
- Uncertainty parameter 0
- Observation arc: 66.15 yr (24,163 days)
- Aphelion: 2.7290 AU
- Perihelion: 2.1638 AU
- Semi-major axis: 2.4464 AU
- Eccentricity: 0.1155
- Orbital period (sidereal): 3.83 yr (1,398 days)
- Mean anomaly: 135.21°
- Mean motion: 0° 15^{m} 27.36^{s} / day
- Inclination: 2.4510°
- Longitude of ascending node: 311.10°
- Argument of perihelion: 211.67°

Physical characteristics
- Dimensions: 7.46 km (calculated); 11.43±2.35 km 13.19±0.55 km 13.97±7.02 km 14.279±0.071 km
- Synodic rotation period: 4.499±0.0014 h 4.499±0.0010 h 4.4994±0.0004 h
- Geometric albedo: 0.050±0.005; 0.063±0.053; 0.07±0.10; 0.088±0.009; 0.20 (assumed)
- Spectral type: S
- Absolute magnitude (H): 12.8 · 12.90 · 12.964±0.002 (R) · 13.0 · 13.15±0.90 · 13.18

2026 Cottrell, provisional designation 1955 FF, is a dark asteroid from the inner regions of the asteroid belt, approximately 12 kilometers in diameter.

The asteroid was discovered on 30 March 1955, by IU's Indiana Asteroid Program at Goethe Link Observatory near Brooklyn, Indiana, United States. It was named after American chemist Frederick Gardner Cottrell.

== Orbit and classification ==
Cottrell orbits the Sun in the inner main-belt at a distance of 2.2–2.7 AU once every 3 years and 10 months (1,398 days). Its orbit has an eccentricity of 0.12 and an inclination of 2° with respect to the ecliptic.

In March 1951, the asteroid was identified as 1951 EL_{1} at Nice Observatory and two days later at McDonald Observatory, extending the body's observation arc by four years prior to its official discovery observation at Goethe Link.

== Physical characteristics ==
=== Lightcurves ===
Two rotational lightcurve of Cottrell were obtained from photometric observations by astronomers at the Palomar Transient Factory in California. Analysis gave an identical rotation period of 4.499 hours for both lightcurves and a brightness variation of 0.42 and 0.44 magnitude, respectively (U=2/2).

In February 2012, photometry at the Etscorn Campus Observatory (719), New Mexico, gave a well-defined period of 4.4994 hours with an amplitude of 0.77 magnitude, which indicates that the body has a non-spheroidal shape (U=3).

=== Diameter and albedo ===
According to the surveys carried out by the Japanese Akari satellite and NASA's Wide-field Infrared Survey Explorer with its subsequent NEOWISE mission, Cottrell measures between 11.43 and 14.279 kilometers in diameter and its surface has an albedo between 0.050 and 0.088.

The Collaborative Asteroid Lightcurve Link assumes a standard albedo for stony asteroids of 0.20 and consequently calculates a much smaller diameter of 7.46 kilometers based on an absolute magnitude of 13.0.

== Naming ==
This minor planet was named after American chemist Frederick Gardner Cottrell (1877–1948), who was a benefactor of the minor planet program at the discovering Goethe Link Observatory. The official naming citation was published by the Minor Planet Center on 1 November 1978 (M.P.C. 4547).
