= Shamai Haber =

Polish sculptor (1922-1995)

Shamai Haber (born February 15, 1922, Łódź, Poland) was a sculptor who lived and worked in Paris, France. He died in 1995 in Paris.

== Biography ==
Haber was born in Łódź, Poland in 1922 but emigrated in 1935. He first went to Luxembourg and then to Israel. While in Tel Aviv he attended the Academy of Fine Arts. He studied with Moshe Sternschuss. In 1949 he moved to Paris.

He was a sculptor and from the 1960s he worked with massive stone and concrete blocks. His sculptures were often used in public parks and fountains. In 1965 he worked with Yitzhak Danziger to create a sculpture at entrance to the Israel Museum in Jerusalem which was the largest sculpture ever erected in Israel. In 1988 he created his best known work, the fountain 'Le Creuset du temps' in the Place de Catalogne in Paris near his studio. In 1959 he received the Prize for sculpture of Anton Bourdelle.

Shamaï Haber died in Paris in 1995 and was buried at the Montparnasse cemetery (8e division, ligne 13 ouest, tombe 7 Sud)

== Works ==
- Composition sur un plateau, 1956, stone sculpture, Sculpturepark, Kröller-Müller Museum, Otterlo, Netherlands;
- Compositie voor een tuin, 1959, stone sculpture, Siegerpark, Amsterdam, Netherlands;
- untitled bronze sculpture, 1960–1969, 18.3 × 0 in. / 46.5 x 0 cm.
- untitled carrara marble sculpture, 1960–1969, 11.4 × 0 in. / 29 x 0 cm.;
- sculpture of stone and steel, 1965, together with Yitzhak Danziger, Sculpture Garden, Israel Museum, Jerusalem;
- Monument commémoratif de la prison du Cherche-Midi, 1973, sculpture, next to the Maison des Sciences de l'Homme located 38, rue du Cherche-Midi / 54, boulevard Raspail, 6e arrondissement, Paris
- Cathédrale, 1975, sculpture, Musée d'Art Moderne de Paris (inv. AMS 529)
- Fontaine Littré, fountain, 4 rue Littré, Paris, 1983 (disappeared)
- Bureau, stainless steel and glass, 32.7 x 70.9 x 35.4 in. / 83 x 180 x 90 cm., 1983
- Fontaine du Creuset-du-Temps (The Crucible of Time), 1988, Place Catalogne, Paris. (2022 dismantled)
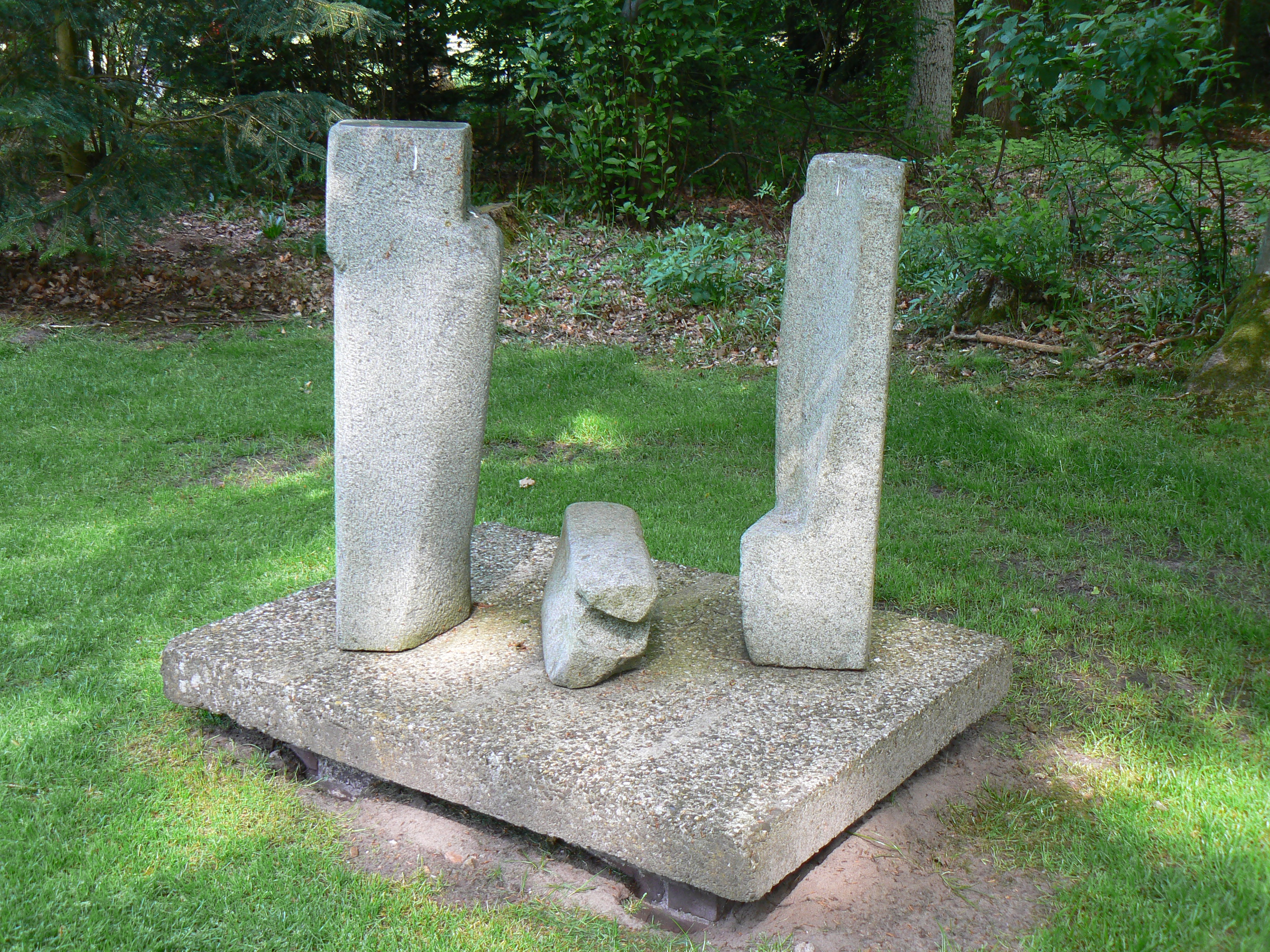
Composition sur un plateau, 1956

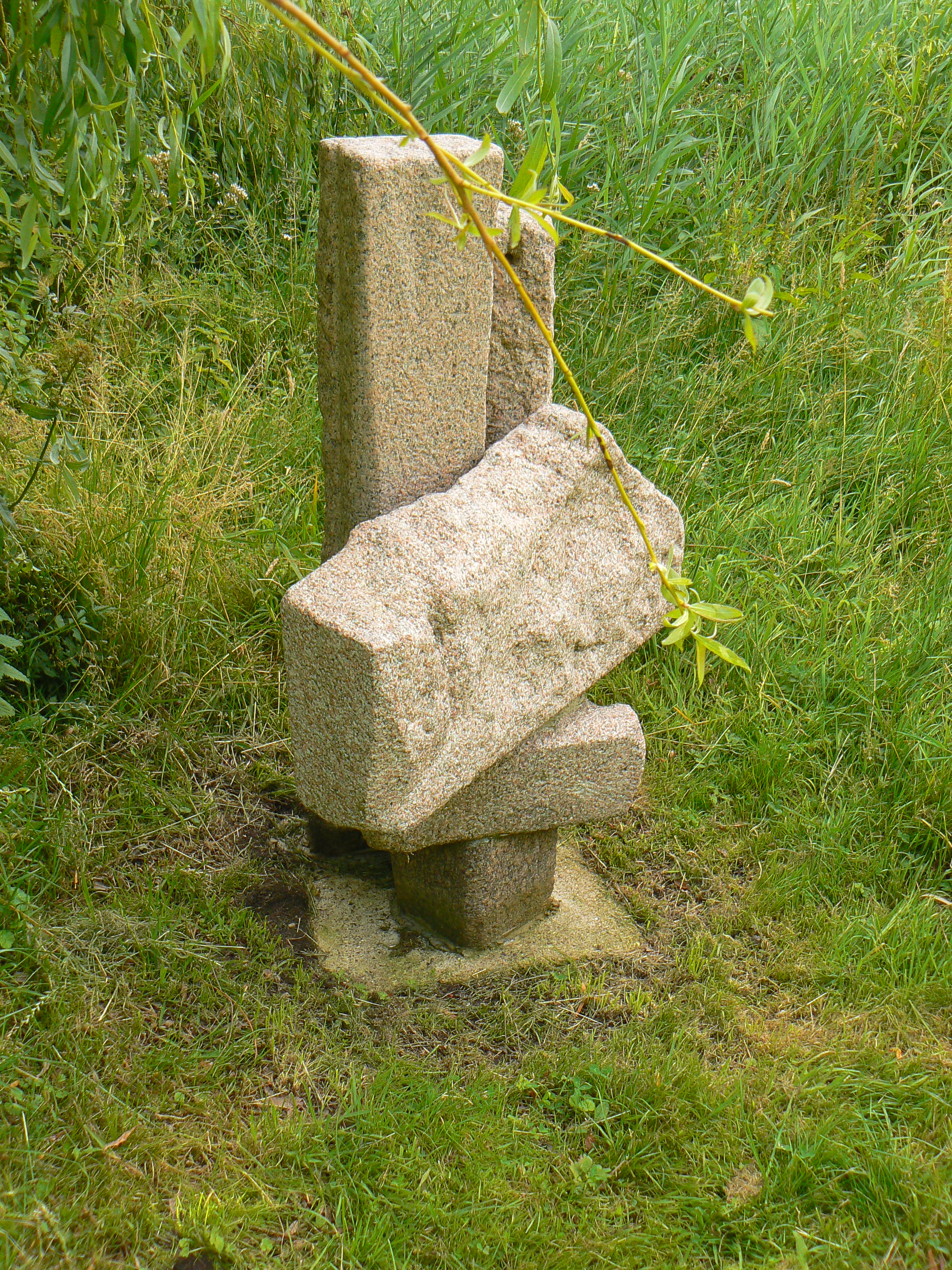
Compositie voor een tuin, 1959
