= Yvonne Haber =

Australian architect

Yvonne Haber is an Australian architect who has been described as "the storage queen".

Haber has advised on architectural matters including regulations around transforming roof and attic space and has spoken about how to design a family home with a view to the future.

Images of her work have appeared in publications such Healthy Homes, published by the Commonwealth of Australia and on Getty Images.
