= George Textor =

American baseball player (1886–1954)

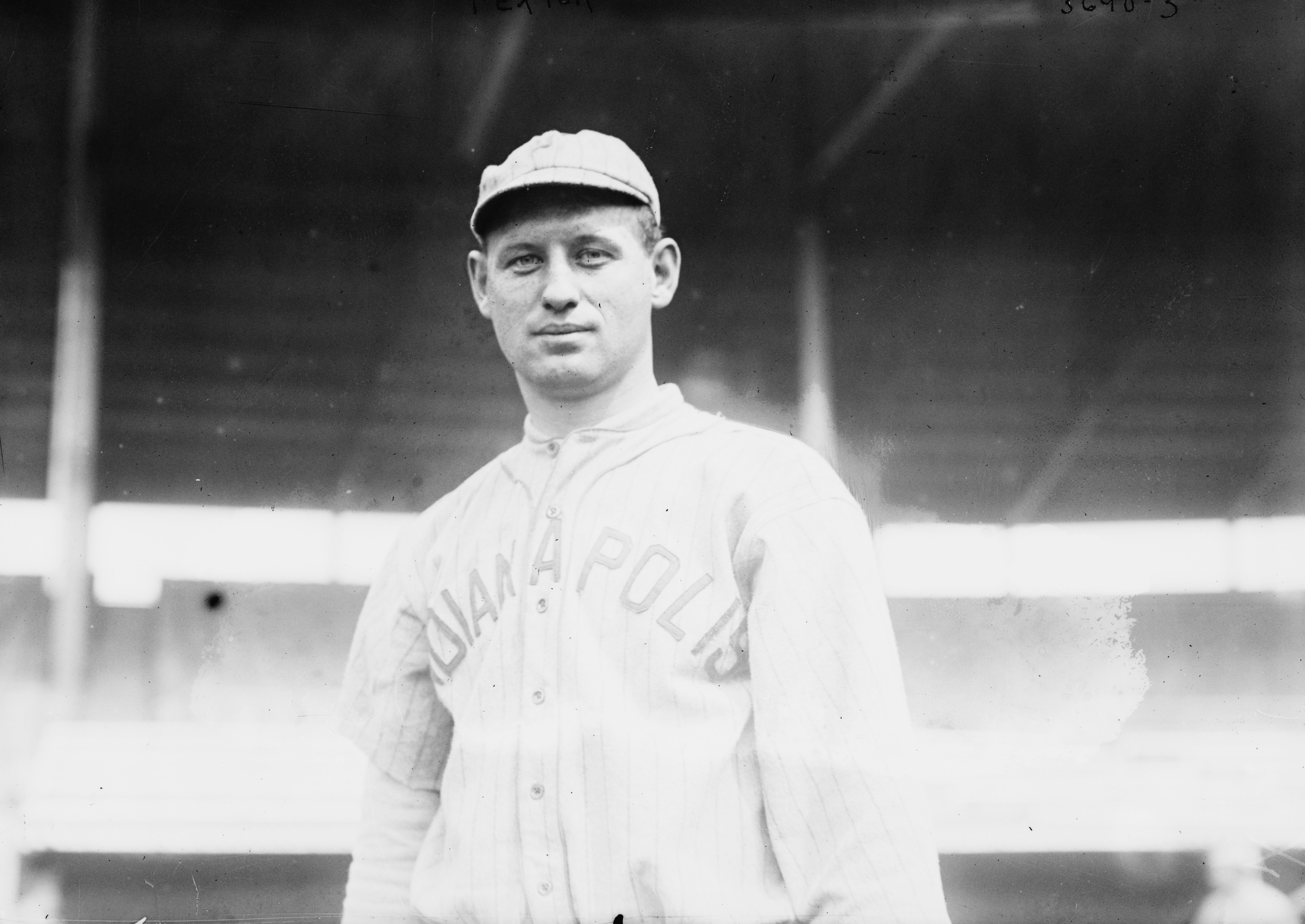
- Catcher
- Born: December 27, 1886; Newport, Kentucky, U.S.
- Died: March 10, 1954 (aged 67); Massillon, Ohio, U.S.
- Batted: Switch Threw: Right

MLB debut
- April 19, 1914, for the Indianapolis Hoosiers

Last MLB appearance
- June 23, 1915, for the Newark Peppers

MLB statistics
- Batting average: .190
- Home runs: 0
- Runs batted in: 4
- Stats at Baseball Reference

Teams
- Indianapolis Hoosiers/Newark Peppers (1914–15)

George Bernhardt Textor (December 27, 1886 - March 10, 1954) was an American Major League Baseball catcher. He played parts of two seasons in the majors, 1914 and 1915, for the Indianapolis Hoosiers and, following their move to New Jersey, the Newark Peppers.
