= Leonard V. Haber =

Leonard V. Haber (1914–1994) was an American architect and industrial designer, known for his work on the restoration of Colonial Williamsburg and as a designer of consumer electronics for the Magnavox Corporation.

== Early life and education ==
A native of New York City, Haber studied art and design in Paris and Florence before earning a fine arts degree from Yale University in 1936.

== Career ==
Following his graduation, Haber joined the faculty at the College of William and Mary, where he taught fine arts. During this period, Haber participated in the architectural restoration of Colonial Williamsburg and served as an adviser to New York's Metropolitan Museum of Art.

After World War II, Haber transitioned to industrial design and became one of the first designers of television sets for the Magnavox Corporation. His work for the company also included the design of radios and stereophonic systems.

== Personal life ==
Haber died of heart failure at his home in Manhattan on June 4, 1994, at the age of 80. His wife, Jane Coleman Murchison Haber, had died the previous year.
