= Carnegie Hall of Moores Hill College =

- U.S. National Register of Historic Places
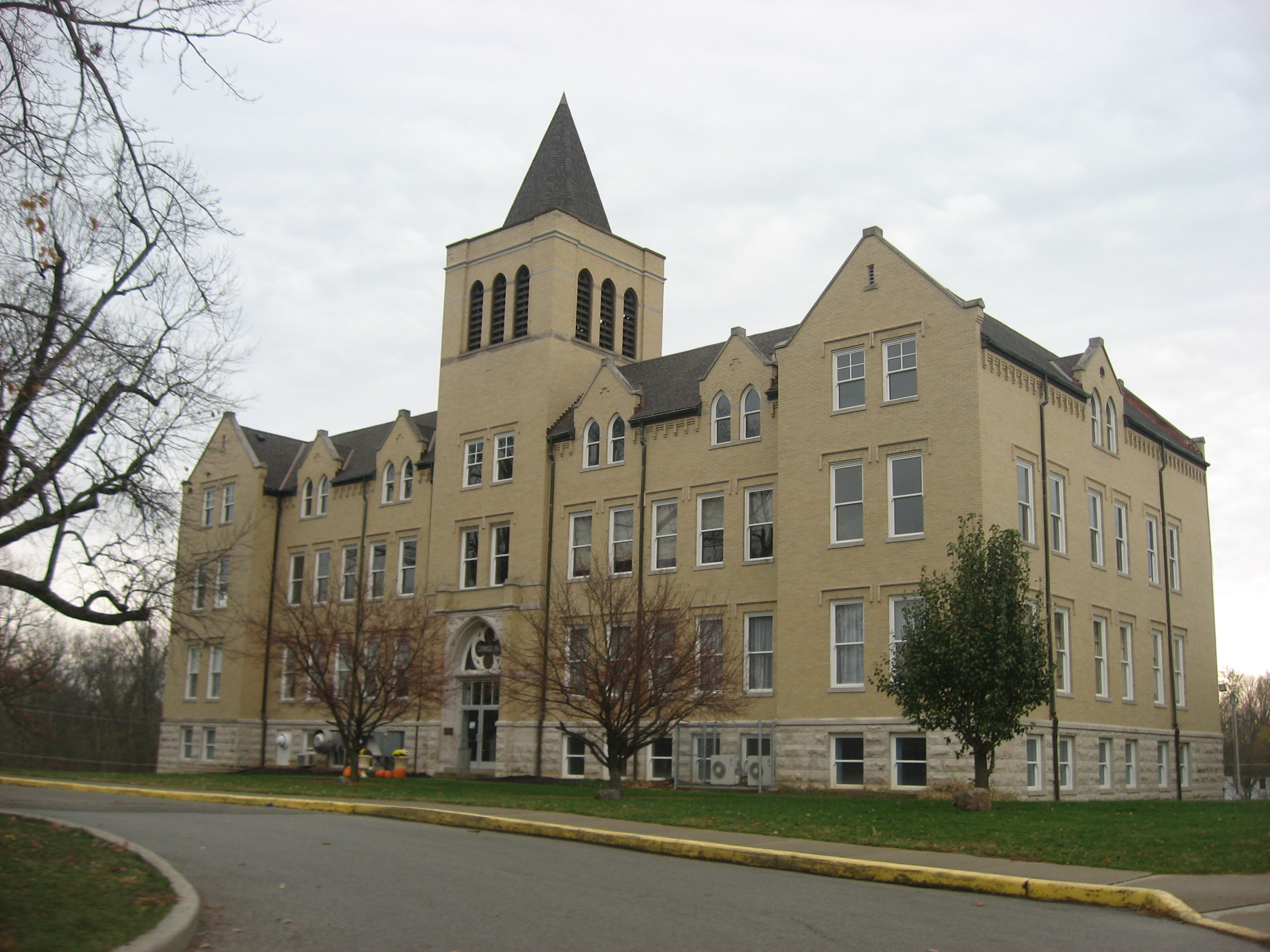
- Carnegie Hall in Moores Hill, November 2012

- Location within Indiana Location within the United States
- Location: 14687 Main St., Moores Hill, Indiana
- Coordinates: 39°6′43″N 85°5′32″W
- Area: 2.6 acres (1.1 ha)
- Built: 1907
- Architect: Crapsey and Lamm; Unkefer, John G., and Co.
- Architectural style: Collegiate Gothic, Jacobethan Revival
- NRHP reference No.: 94000229
- Added to NRHP: March 17, 1994

Carnegie Hall of Moores Hill College, also known as Moores Hill High School, is a historic educational building located at Moores Hill, Indiana. It was built in 1907, and is a 2 1/2-story, "T"-plan, brick building with Collegiate Gothic and Jacobethan Revival style design elements. It sits on a raised limestone faced basement. The building consists of a central portion flanked by projecting wings bisected by a central bell tower with pyramidal roof. It features a steeply pitched gable roof, parapeted gables, terra cotta trim, and pointed arch openings. The building housed Moores Hill College until 1917, when it moved to Evansville to later become the University of Evansville. It was funded in part by Andrew Carnegie, who donated $18,750 to its construction. It later housed the local high school and elementary school until 1987.

The original college was named Moores Hill Male and Female Collegiate Institute when it was established in 1854, and was founded by the Methodist Church. The college's governing board entered enthusiastically upon construction of the original building known as Moore Hall (in the grassy lot to the north of the later site of Carnegie Hall), then ran short of funds as so many similar early endeavors did. At the same time the town's Masonic lodge, Allen Lodge No. 165 was just being established. Its members accepted an offer by the college trustees to provide quarters for any fraternal organization that would contribute to the building fund. The building was completed in part through the financial assistance of the Masons.

A room on the third floor was set aside for the Lodge's use. The Brethren met in their new hall for the first time in January 1856 and continuously thereafter for the next 59 years. The original Moore Hall was destroyed by fire in 1915. A Masonic historical marker was placed on the site in 1974.

Carnegie Hall was added to the National Register of Historic Places in 1994.
