= Haber (annelid) =

Scientific classification
- Domain: Eukaryota
- Kingdom: Animalia
- Phylum: Annelida
- Clade: Pleistoannelida
- Clade: Sedentaria
- Class: Clitellata
- Order: Tubificida
- Family: Naididae
- Genus: Haber; Holmquist, 1978

Genus of annelid worms

Haber is a genus of annelids belonging to the family Naididae.

The species of this genus are found in Europe, Russia and Northern America.

Species:

- Haber amurensis (Sokolskaja & Hrabĕ, 1969)
- Haber dojranensis (Hrabĕ, 1958)
- Haber hubsugulensis (Semernoy, 1980)
- Haber monfalconensis (Hrabĕ, 1966)
- Haber pyrenaicus (Juget & Giani, 1974)
- Haber speciosus (Hrabĕ, 1931)
- Haber svirenkoi (Lastockin, 1937)
- Haber swirenkoi (Lastočkin, 1937)
- Haber turquinae (Juget & Lafont, 1979)
- Haber vetus (Semernoy, 1982)
