= Moores Hill, Indiana =

- Town
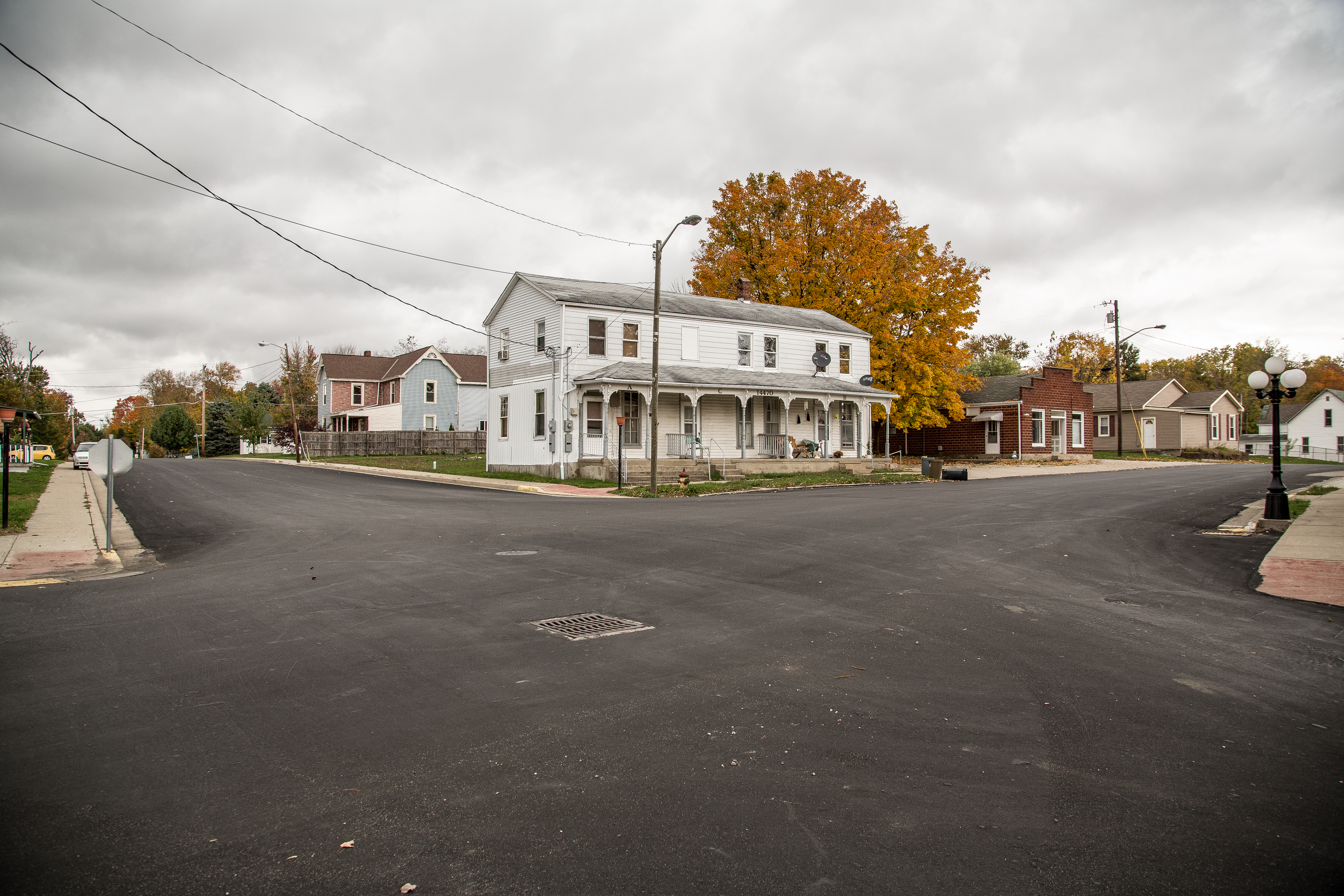

- Location of Moores Hill in Dearborn County, Indiana.
- Coordinates: 39°06′47″N 85°05′21″W
- Country: United States
- State: Indiana
- County: Dearborn
- Township: Sparta

Area
  - Total: 0.43 sq mi (1.11 km^{2})
  - Land: 0.43 sq mi (1.11 km^{2})
  - Water: 0 sq mi (0.00 km^{2})
- Elevation: 994 ft (303 m)

Population (2020)
  - Total: 675
  - Density: 1,569.7/sq mi (606.07/km^{2})
- Time zone: UTC-5 (Eastern (EST))
  - Summer (DST): UTC-4 (EDT)
- ZIP code: 47032
- Area code: 812
- FIPS code: 18-50958
- GNIS feature ID: 2396779
- Website: mooreshill.in.gov

Moores Hill is a town in Sparta Township, Dearborn County, Indiana, United States. The population was 675 at the 2020 census.

== History ==
Platted in 1839 by Adam Moore and Andrew Stevens, it originally contained nine lots adjacent to Moore's gristmill. The community was originally known as Moores Mill, but postal authorities misspelled it Moores Hill, and the name stuck.

Many early settlers in the town were Methodist families from Delaware and the shore of Maryland. The first mercantile business was established by Samuel Herron.

Carnegie Hall of Moores Hill College and Moores Hill United Methodist Church are listed on the National Register of Historic Places.

== Geography ==
According to the 2010 census, Moores Hill has a total area of 0.54 square miles (1.40 km^{2}), all land.

=== Climate ===
The climate in this area is characterized by hot, humid summers and generally mild to cool winters. According to the Köppen Climate Classification system, Moores Hill has a humid subtropical climate, abbreviated "Cfa" on climate maps.

== Demographics ==
Historical population
Census	Pop.	Note	%±
1850	206		—
1870	617		—
1880	333		−46.0%
1890	469		40.8%
1900	338		−27.9%
1910	424		25.4%
1920	285		−32.8%
1930	349		22.5%
1940	359		2.9%
1950	445		24.0%
1960	476		7.0%
1970	616		29.4%
1980	566		−8.1%
1990	649		14.7%
2000	635		−2.2%
2010	597		−6.0%
2020	675		13.1%
U.S. Decennial Census

=== 2010 census ===
As of the census of 2010, there were 597 people, 223 households, and 155 families living in the town. The population density was 1,105.6 inhabitants per square mile (426.9/km^{2}). There were 252 housing units at an average density of 466.7 per square mile (180.2/km^{2}). The racial makeup of the town was 97.8% White, 0.2% African American, 0.2% Asian, 0.7% from other races, and 1.2% from two or more races. Hispanic or Latino of any race were 0.3% of the population.

There were 223 households, of which 36.8% had children under the age of 18 living with them, 48.4% were married couples living together, 12.6% had a female householder with no husband present, 8.5% had a male householder with no wife present, and 30.5% were non-families. 26.0% of all households were made up of individuals, and 8.5% had someone living alone who was 65 years of age or older. The average household size was 2.68 and the average family size was 3.22.

The median age in the town was 37.5 years. 28.5% of residents were under the age of 18; 7.6% were between the ages of 18 and 24; 27.2% were from 25 to 44; 26.7% were from 45 to 64; and 10.1% were 65 years of age or older. The gender makeup of the town was 47.4% male and 52.6% female.

=== 2000 census ===
As of the census of 2000, there were 635 people, 218 households, and 178 families living in the town. The population density was 1,336.7 inhabitants per square mile (516.1/km^{2}). There were 234 housing units at an average density of 492.6 per square mile (190.2/km^{2}). The racial makeup of the town was 97.32% White, 0.47% African American, 1.10% Native American, 0.47% from other races, and 0.63% from two or more races. Hispanic or Latino of any race were 1.10% of the population.

There were 218 households, out of which 50.0% had children under the age of 18 living with them, 57.3% were married couples living together, 19.3% had a female householder with no husband present, and 17.9% were non-families. 12.8% of all households were made up of individuals, and 4.6% had someone living alone who was 65 years of age or older. The average household size was 2.91 and the average family size was 3.15.

In the town, the population was spread out, with 35.6% under the age of 18, 7.9% from 18 to 24, 31.2% from 25 to 44, 18.1% from 45 to 64, and 7.2% who were 65 years of age or older. The median age was 29 years. For every 100 females, there were 93.6 males. For every 100 females age 18 and over, there were 90.2 males.

The median income for a household in the town was $38,295, and the median income for a family was $38,875. Males had a median income of $36,597 versus $20,875 for females. The per capita income for the town was $12,832. About 12.2% of families and 17.0% of the population were below the poverty line, including 24.2% of those under age 18 and 4.3% of those age 65 or over.

== Notable people ==
- Walt Justis, baseball player
- E. J. Pennington, automotive pioneer
- Janet Rumsey, baseball player
