= Covington Blue Sox =

Former American professional baseball club

Information
- Location: Covington, Kentucky
- Ballpark: Federal Park
- Founded: 1913
- Nickname(s): Colonels; Federals
- Former league: Federal League

The Covington Blue Sox were a Federal League baseball club in Covington, Kentucky, in 1913. The team was also referred to as the Covington Colonels or Covington Federals in contemporary newspaper reports. The team was moved to Kansas City in July 1913 and became known thereafter as the Kansas City Packers.

== History ==
Baseball has been played in Covington since the 1870s, with the Star club a popular amateur side that competed with the top non-professional clubs in Ohio and Kentucky. On September 21, 1875, the Star Baseball Park hosted a National Association game between the Philadelphia Athletics and the Hartford Dark Blues; the Athletics (not to be confused with the 20th century team of this name) won, 13–9, in front of a crowd of 800.

In 1912 or 1913, Covington city leaders tried to acquire a baseball franchise in the Class D Blue Grass League. The Cincinnati Reds, whose ballpark was just 5 miles (8 km) away across the Ohio River, blocked the move. Instead, after several larger cities backed out, Covington was awarded a franchise in the Federal League, a new "outlaw" circuit.

The city raised $13,500, with $6,000 budgeted to build the ballpark. Bernard Wisenall, a prominent local architect, designed Federal Park (also called Riverbreeze Park) with a capacity of 6,000. The ballpark was bounded by East 2nd Street, East 3rd Street, Madison Avenue and Scott Boulevard. Playing in the dead-ball era, the park was built with small dimensions, possibly the smallest ever built for any pro baseball park, with a distance of just 194 feet down the right-field line, 267 feet to dead center, and 218 feet down the left-field line, more akin to a modern Little League ball field than a pro ballpark, which has a required minimum of 325 feet down the foul lines. Construction did not begin until a month before opening day.

The Blue Sox started their season on a long road trip, with a game against Cleveland on May 3. The game ended in a 6–6 tie, called after ten innings due to darkness.

The Blue Sox managed to sell out their first home game on May 9, with thousands of fans turned away. Covington's mayor George "Pat" Phillips declared a half-holiday for the city, closing city offices at noon and encouraging businesses to follow suit in support the team. Pregame festivities included a parade, bands, and decorations across city along with the mayor tossing out a golden ball for the ceremonial first pitch. Messenger pigeons were released to spread the news of the opening to each city on the Federal League circuit as well as one going to U.S. President Woodrow Wilson. Pitcher Walt Justis shut out the St. Louis Terriers in a 4–0 victory.

However, Covington (which had about 55,000 people at the time) wasn't really a big enough town to support the team, and drew only an average of 650 for the remainder of their initial nine-game home stand. By June, the team was mired in fourth place with a 21–31 record and drawing a few hundred a game; altogether, the Sox had a total attendance of only about 8,000 to the nineteen home games after the opener. June 21 turned out to be the club's final home game. On June 23, it was announced that the Blue Sox would leave town; on June 26, the league voted to move the team to Kansas City, where it was renamed the Packers. The owners of the Covington team yielded their rights to their creditors.

After spending the 1913 season as an independent circuit, the Federal League declared itself a major league in 1914; the league folded after the 1915 campaign, with the American and National Leagues essentially buying them out.

Federal Park was used for other events over the next few years, including boxing and auto polo, but was torn down in 1919 to make room for a new tobacco warehouse. The warehouse was then later replaced by the present-day Kenton County Circuit Courthouse. Covington has not hosted a professional team in any sport since; however, Highland Heights, located 6 miles (9.7 km) from Covington, hosted indoor pro football in the early 2010s.

== Logo ==
The Blue Sox logo was a line drawing of a batter with the blue initials "BS."

== Notable players ==
- Sam Leever
- Walt Justis
