= Federal League =

American professional baseball league

- Most recent season or competition: 1915 Federal League season
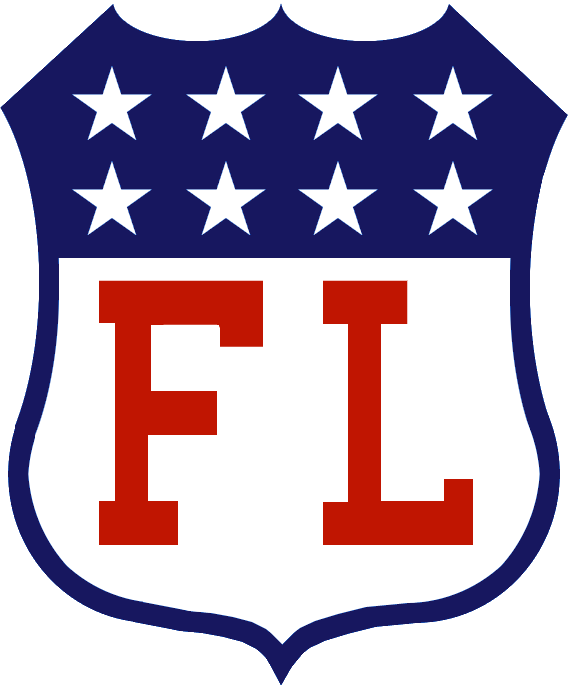
- Sport: Baseball
- Founded: 1913
- Founder: John T. Powers
- Folded: 1915
- President: James A. Gilmore
- No. of teams: 8
- Country: United States
- Last champion: Chicago Whales
- Most titles: (2) Indianapolis Hoosiers

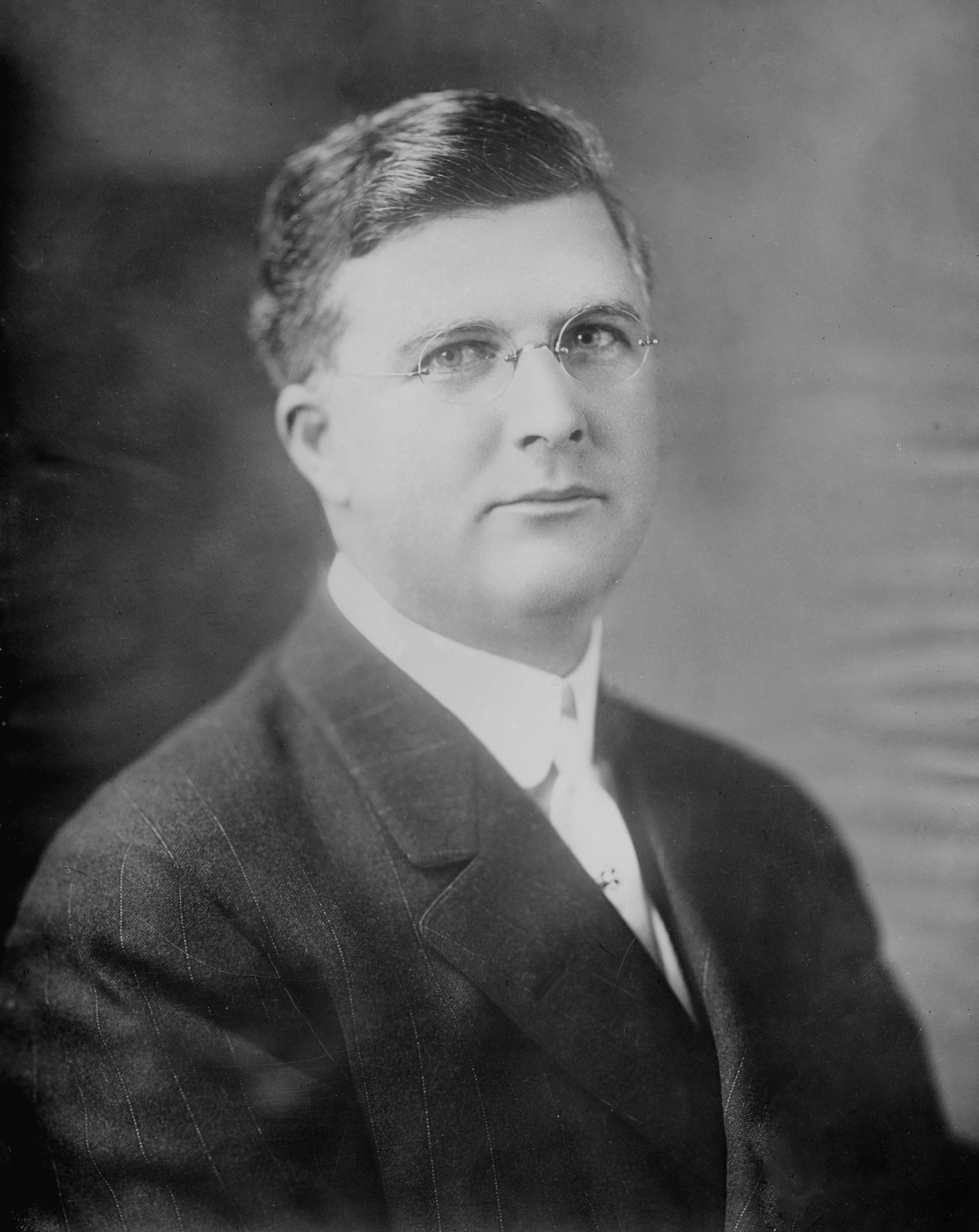
James A. Gilmore of the Federal League c. 1913

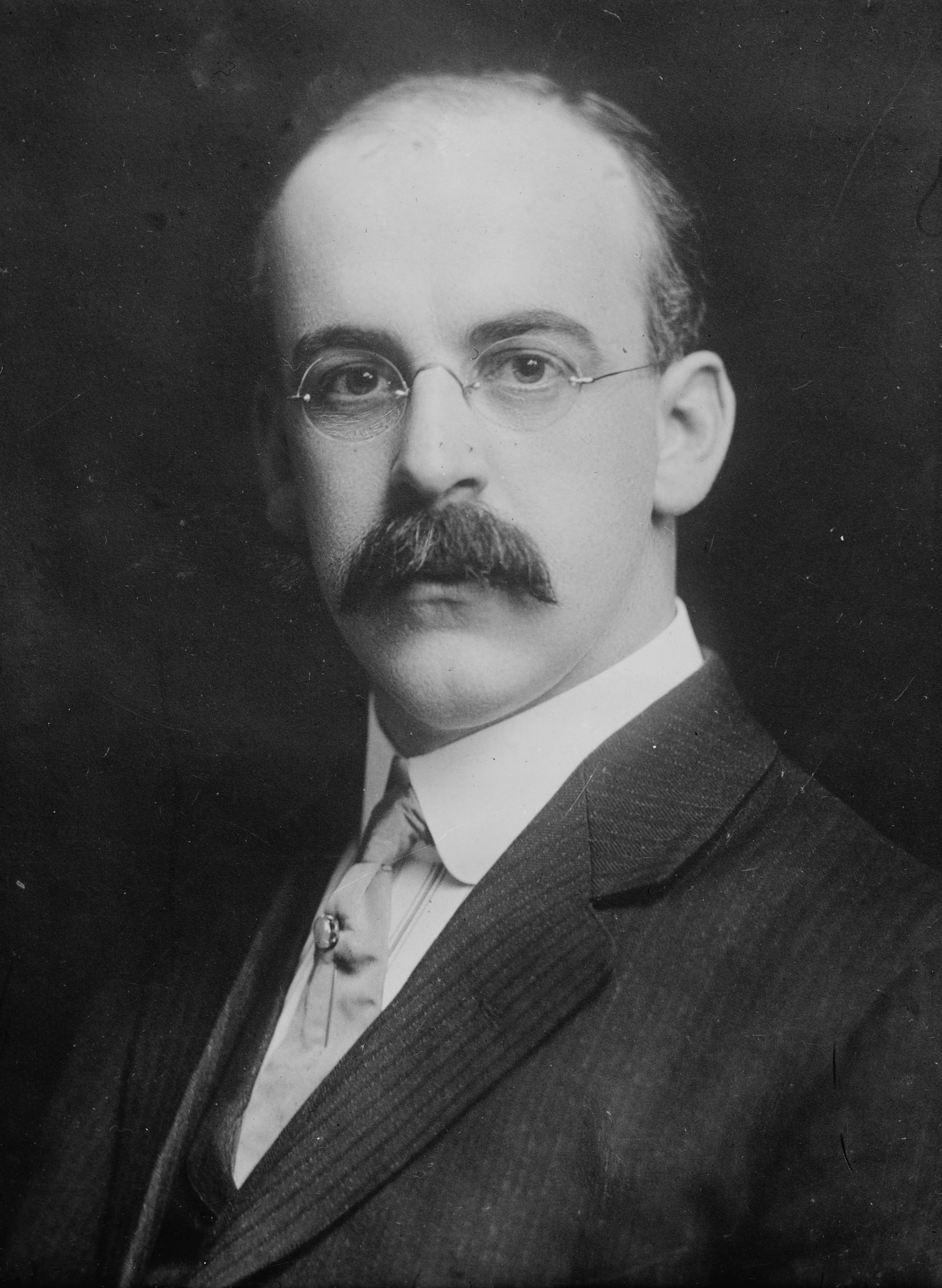
William E. Robertson, president of the Buffalo, New York Federal League baseball team the Buffalo Blues.

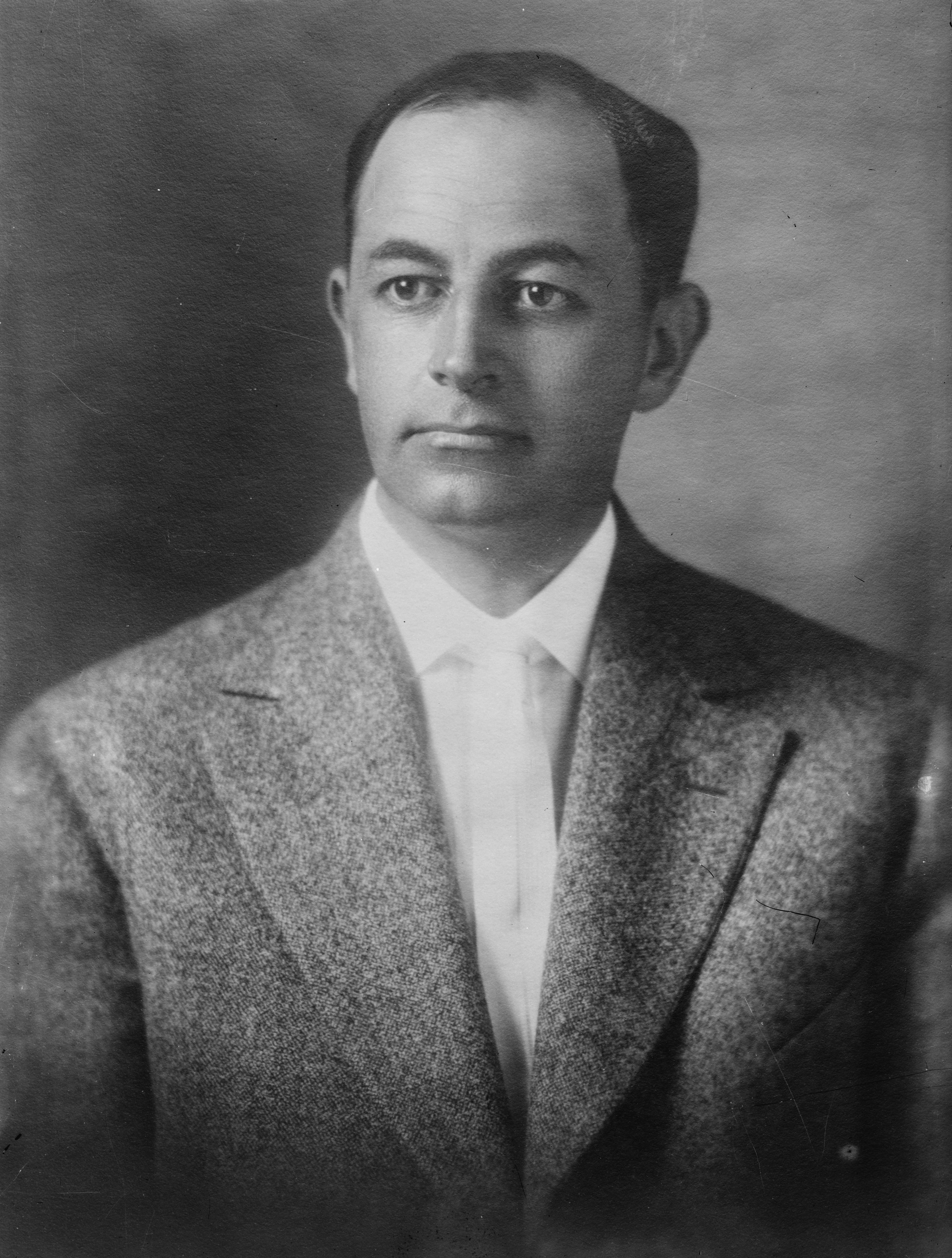
C. C. Madison in 1915, owner of the Kansas City, Missouri baseball club of the Federal League, the Kansas City Packers.

The Federal League of Base Ball Clubs, known simply as the Federal League, was an American professional baseball league that played its first season as a minor league in 1913 and operated as a "third major league", in competition with the established National and American Leagues, from 1914 to 1915.

The Federal League came together in early 1913 through the work of John T. Powers, and immediately challenged the operations of organized baseball as a minor league playing outside of the National Agreement. After James A. Gilmore succeeded Powers as league president, the league declared itself to be a major league. Playing in what detractors called the "outlaw" league allowed players to avoid the restrictions of the organized leagues' reserve clause. The competition of another, better paying league caused players' salaries to skyrocket, demonstrating the bargaining potential of free agency for the first time since the war between the AL and NL.

Interference by the National and American Leagues in their operations caused the Federal League to fold after the 1915 season. This resulted in a landmark federal lawsuit, Federal Baseball Club v. National League, in which the U.S. Supreme Court ultimately ruled that the Sherman Antitrust Act did not apply to Major League Baseball. The Federal League left its mark on baseball history in the field now known as Wrigley Field, which was originally built for the Chicago Whales Federal League team. The league itself and many sports writers considered it a major league during its existence; organized baseball recognized its major league status in 1968. Not including the Negro Major Leagues, it would be the last independent major league outside the established structure of professional baseball to make it to the playing field, and would be the last serious attempt to create a third major league until the abortive Continental League of 1960.

== History ==
In 1912, baseball promoter John T. Powers formed an independent professional league known as the Columbian League. However, the withdrawal of one of the organization's primary investors caused the league to fail before ever playing a game. Undaunted, Powers tried again the following year, creating a new league with teams in Chicago, Cleveland, Pittsburgh, Indianapolis, St. Louis, and Covington, Kentucky. He named the organization the Federal League, and served as its first president.

Because it did not abide by the National Agreement on player payment in place in organized baseball, the Federal League was called an "outlaw league" by its competitors. The Federal League's outlaw status allowed it to recruit players from established clubs, and it attracted many current and former players from the major as well as minor leagues. In 1913, the Federal League played as an independent six-team minor league. In its first season Powers initially served as president, but he was soon replaced by James A. Gilmore, under whose leadership the league declared itself a major league for the 1914 season. Other financiers of the League included oil baron Harry F. Sinclair, ice magnate Phil Ball, and George S. Ward of the Ward Baking Company.

As a major circuit, the Federal League consisted of eight teams each season. Four of the teams were placed in cities with existing major league baseball teams (Chicago, St. Louis, Pittsburgh and Brooklyn). The other four teams were placed in areas without a current major league club (Baltimore, Buffalo, Indianapolis and Kansas City). In the first year, 1914, some of the teams had official nicknames and some did not, but either way, sportswriters were inclined to invent their own nicknames: "ChiFeds," "BrookFeds," etc. By the second season, most of the teams had "official" nicknames, although many writers still called many of the teams "-Feds."

In order for the Federal League to succeed, it needed Big League players. Walter Johnson signed a three-year contract with the Chicago team, but the Senators' Clark Griffith went personally to Johnson's home in Kansas and made a successful counter-offer. Major League players that jumped to the Federal League included Bill McKechnie, Claude Hendrix, Jack Quinn, Russell Ford, Tom Seaton, Doc Crandall, Al Bridwell, and Hal Chase. The Federal League also recruited Big League names to manage the new teams. Joe Tinker managed the Chicago team, Mordecai Brown managed the St. Louis team and Bill Bradley managed the Brooklyn team.

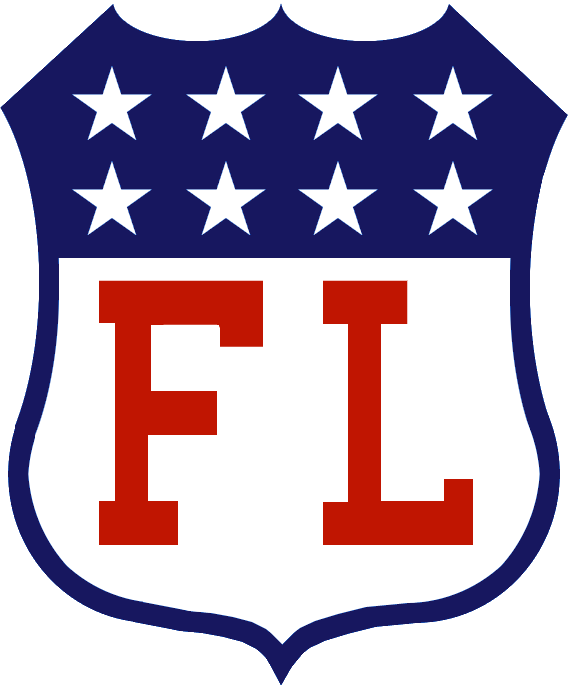
Federal League logo

In 1914, the Colonial League began to operate as a Class C level league based in Southern New England. In April, Alexander Bannwart drew notice by acquiring Big Jeff Pfeffer to manage the team in Pawtucket, Rhode Island, and by May, it was suspected that Bannwart was working as an agent of the Federal League, which Bannwart denied. Upon these news reports, some of the founding members of the Colonial League resigned, fearing banishment by the National Baseball Commission.

At the April 1915 league meeting, Coppen was re-elected as president and Bannwart was elected secretary. Walter S. Ward, the treasurer of the Brooklyn Tip-Tops of the Federal League and George S. Ward's son, was elected as the league's treasurer. The Colonial League reorganized itself as a farm system for the Federal League and voluntarily withdrew itself from organized baseball.

The Federal League had close pennant races both years. In 1914, Indianapolis beat out Chicago by 1½ games. 1915 witnessed the tightest pennant race in Major League history, as three teams (Chicago, St. Louis and Pittsburgh) fought into the last weekend of the season. On the season's final day, Sunday, October 3, Chicago split a doubleheader with Pittsburgh, winning the darkness-shortened seven-inning nightcap, 3-0; this combined with St. Louis' 6-2 win over Kansas City, knocked Pittsburgh back to third (albeit just a half-game behind), with Chicago and St. Louis in a virtual tie for first. But since the Whales (86-66) played two fewer games than the St. Louis Terriers (87-67), they were awarded the pennant based on their slightly better winning percentage (.566 to .565). Pittsburgh, with one game unplayed, ended up at 86-67 (.562).

During the 1914–15 offseason, Federal League owners brought an antitrust lawsuit against the American and National Leagues. The lawsuit ended up in the court of Federal Judge (and future Commissioner of Baseball) Kenesaw Mountain Landis, who allowed the case to languish while he urged both sides to negotiate. Swift action might have made a difference, but without the lawsuit going forward, the Federals found themselves in deepening financial straits.

After the 1915 season, the owners of the American and National Leagues bought out half of the owners (Pittsburgh, Newark, Buffalo, and Brooklyn) of the Federal League teams. Two Federal League owners were allowed to buy struggling franchises in the established leagues: Phil Ball, owner of the St. Louis Terriers, was allowed to buy the St. Louis Browns of the AL, and Charles Weeghman, owner of the Chicago Whales, bought the Chicago Cubs. Both owners merged their teams into the established ones. The Kansas City franchise had been declared bankrupt and taken over by the league office after the close of the regular season, and the Baltimore owners rejected the offer made to them. They had sought to buy and move an existing franchise to their city, but were rebuffed, and sued unsuccessfully.

== Legacy ==
One of baseball's most famous ballparks was originally built for a Federal League team: Wrigley Field, the home of the Chicago Cubs, began its long life as Weeghman Park, the home of the Chicago Whales. Marc Okkonen, in his book on the Federal League, referred to Wrigley as a "silent monument" to the failed Federal League experiment. Otherwise, few visible remnants were left by the short-lived Federal League. The Baltimore entry sold their facility to the Baltimore Orioles of the International League, who renamed it Oriole Park and played there for nearly 30 years before it was destroyed by fire. The Newark ballpark was also used for minor league ball for a short time.

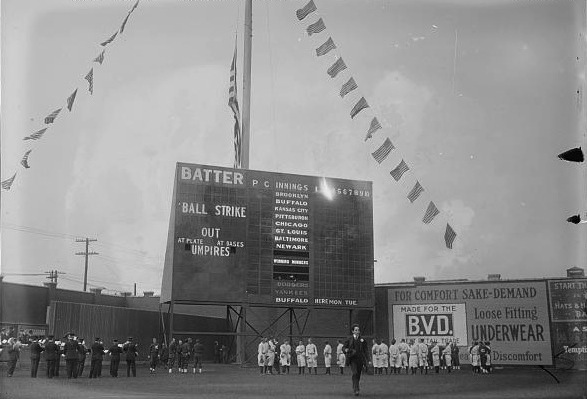
Washington Park in April 1915

Washington Park III in Brooklyn, completed after the 1915 season was underway, resembled Chicago's Weeghman Park. It was used for various sports until the end of 1917 and then for storage until Brooklyn Edison Electric bought the property in 1925 and shortly thereafter tore it down. One wall still stands.

The other Federal League ballparks were demolished quickly, including the home of the Pittsburgh Rebels, Exposition Park, which had been the home of the Pittsburgh Pirates of the National League until they moved into Forbes Field in 1909.

The other "silent monument" to the Federal League is a famous legal decision. In 1922, the Supreme Court ruled in Federal Baseball Club v. National League (brought by the Terrapins, one of the teams which had not been bought out), that Major League Baseball and its constituent leagues were primarily entertainment, not conventional interstate commerce, and thus were exempt from the Sherman Antitrust Act; MLB remains the only North American sports league with such a status, and it has not faced any competitor leagues since unlike the other pro sports leagues because of this exemption. Though significantly weakened in the 1970s, this exemption remains intact 104 years later; however, it has been eroded by subsequent court rulings and legislation regarding issues specific to Major League Baseball.

Of the locations of teams in the Federal League, five currently have major league teams. Those are Baltimore, Chicago, Kansas City, Pittsburgh and St. Louis. Brooklyn has a minor league team, the Brooklyn Cyclones. (The major league Brooklyn Dodgers moved to Los Angeles in 1958, although the New York Mets, the Cyclones' parent club, have been located in the adjacent borough of Queens since 1964.) Buffalo and Indianapolis have International League teams, the Buffalo Bisons and Indianapolis Indians, respectively. Newark had a team, the Bears, in the independent Can-Am League, which folded after the 2012 season.

There is at least one achievement of note that happened in Federal League play. Eddie Plank, pitching for the St. Louis Terriers, won his milestone 300th game on September 11, 1915, at St. Louis' Handlan's Park, becoming the first 300-game winning left-hander in the history of major league baseball and one of only six as of 2018. However, that milestone was not acknowledged by Major League Baseball until 1968.

The Federal League was the last serious attempt at creating a "third major league" outside the established structure of professional baseball in the U.S. There was one further attempt at creating a third league – the Continental League in 1959 – but its founders had hoped to find their place within the purview of organized baseball. The Continental League disbanded in 1960 without ever playing a game, making the Federal League the last such league to ever take to the field.

The Federal League features prominently in Ring Lardner's sports humor book You Know Me Al (1916), in which the protagonist pitches for the Chicago White Sox and repeatedly threatens to jump to the Federal League whenever he feels underappreciated or underpaid.

== Baseball Hall of Famers ==
Players in the Baseball Hall of Fame who played in the Federal League are listed below. Each of these players was elected via the Veterans Committee. In addition, Cy Young managed the 1913 Cleveland Green Sox.

Player	Position	Team(s)	Induction year
Chief Bender	Pitcher	Baltimore Terrapins (1915)	1953
Mordecai Brown	Pitcher	St. Louis Terriers, Brooklyn Tip-Tops (1914); Chicago Whales (1915)	1949
Bill McKechnie	Third baseman	Indianapolis Hoosiers (1914); Newark Peppers (1915)	1962
Eddie Plank	Pitcher	St. Louis Terriers (1915)	1946
Edd Roush	Center fielder	Indianapolis Hoosiers (1914); Newark Peppers (1915)	1962
Joe Tinker	Shortstop	Chicago Whales (1914–1915)	1946

== Teams ==
Team	Seasons	Comment
Baltimore Terrapins	1914–15	
Brooklyn Tip-Tops	1914–15	
Buffalo Blues	1914–15	Initially known as the Buffeds
Chicago Whales	1913–15	Initially known as the Federals or Keeleys
Cleveland Green Sox	1913	
Covington Blue Sox	1913	Also known as the Colonels. Transferred to Kansas City, mid-season 1913
Indianapolis Hoosiers	1913–14	Moved to Newark in 1915
Kansas City Packers	1913–15	Had been in Covington until mid-season 1913
Newark Peppers	1915	Moved from Indianapolis following the 1914 season
Pittsburgh Rebels	1913–15	Known as the Filipinos in 1913, and initially as the Stogies in 1914
St. Louis Terriers	1913–15	

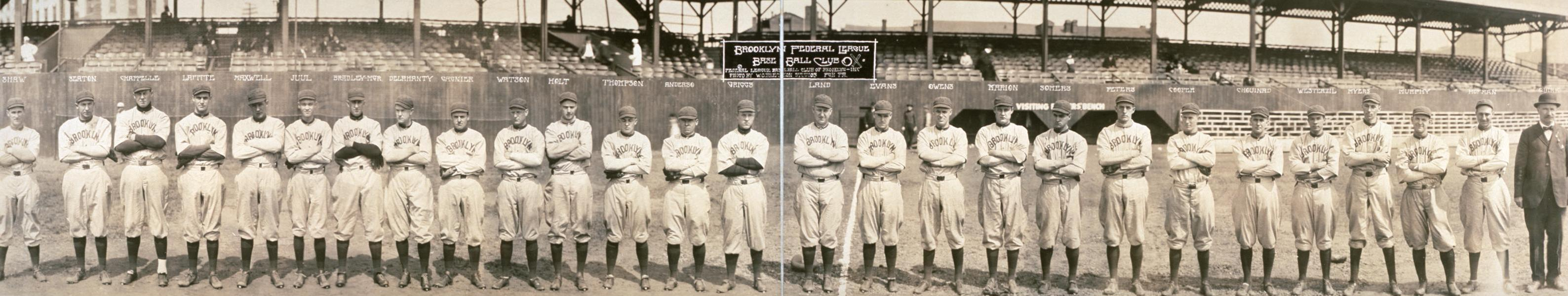
1914 Brooklyn Tip-Tops

== Results ==
=== Champions ===
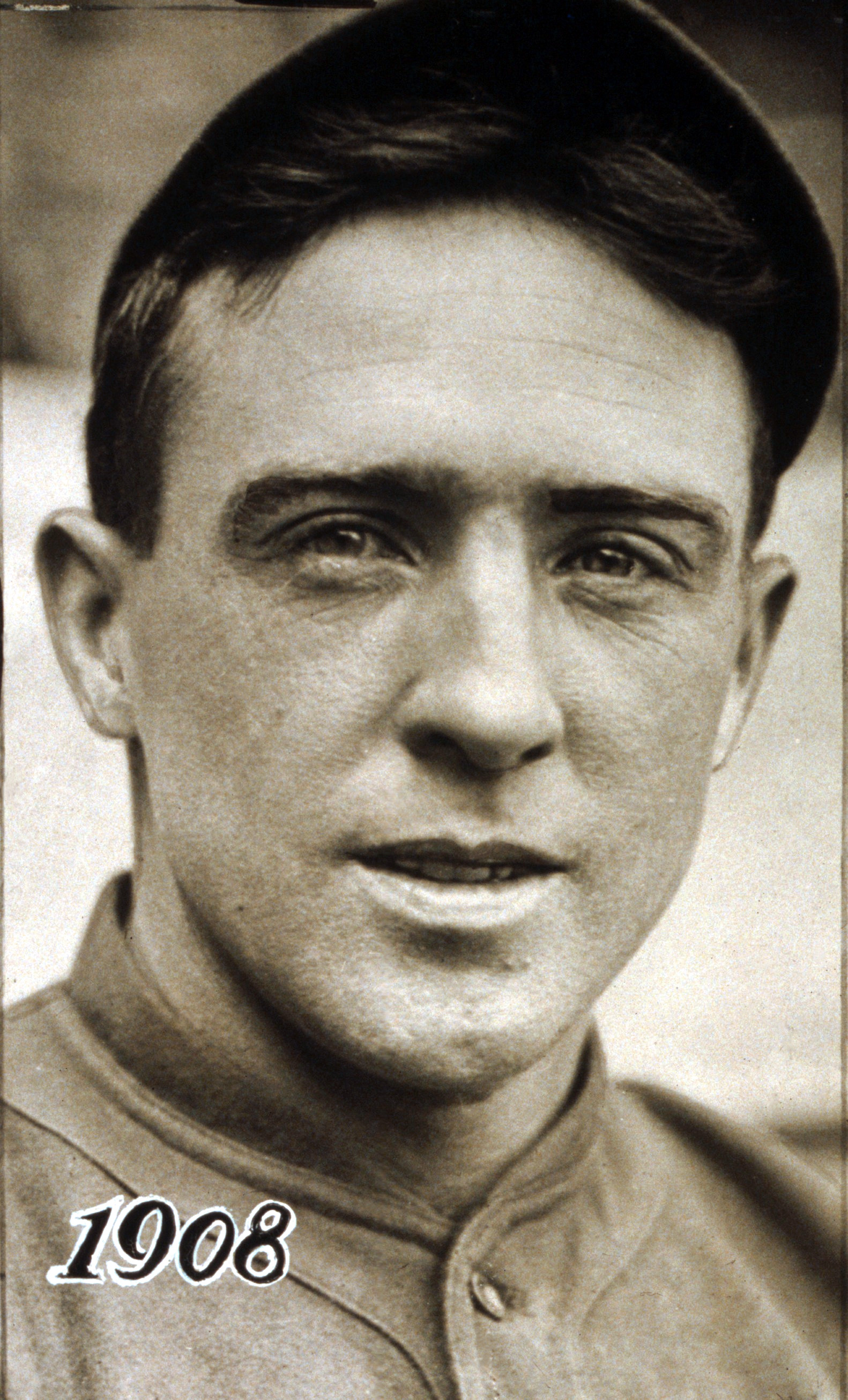
Joe Tinker managed the 1915 Chicago Whales.

Per final regular season standings, as there was no postseason.

Year	Team	Record	Manager	Note
1913	Indianapolis Hoosiers	75–45	Bill Phillips	Minor league
1914	Indianapolis Hoosiers	88–65	Bill Phillips	Major league
1915	Chicago Whales	86–66	Joe Tinker	Major league

=== Standings ===
1913

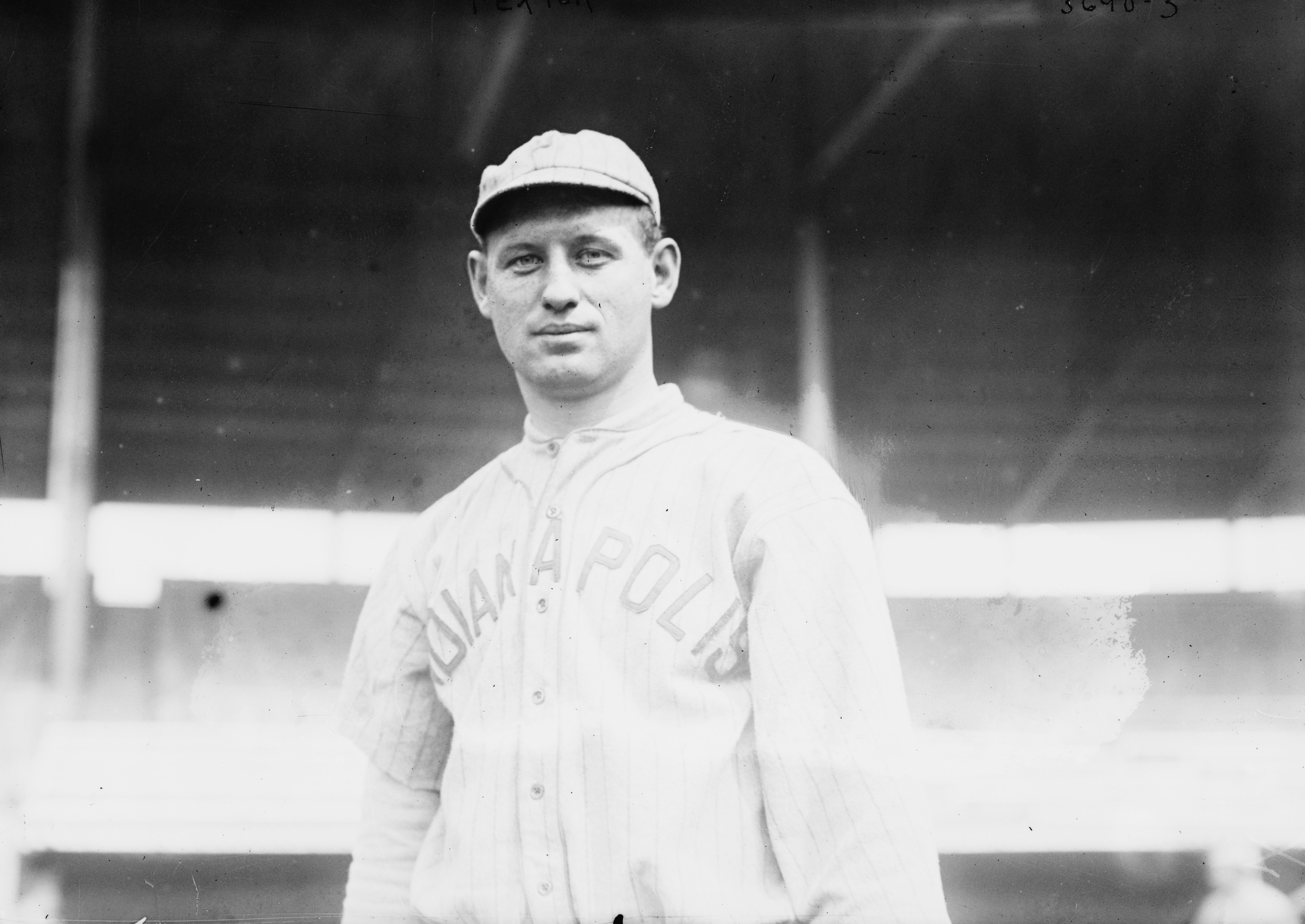
George Textor played for Indianapolis in 1913.

Federal League	W	L	Pct.	GB
Indianapolis Hoosiers	75	45	0.625	—
Cleveland Green Sox	64	54	0.542	10
St. Louis Terriers	59	60	0.496	15½
Chicago Keeleys	57	62	0.479	17½
Covington Blue Sox / Kansas City Packers	53	65	0.449	21
Pittsburgh Stogies	49	71	0.408	26

Notes:
- The Federal League operated as an independent minor league in 1913.
- Covington's record was 21–20 when they relocated to Kansas City on June 26.

1914

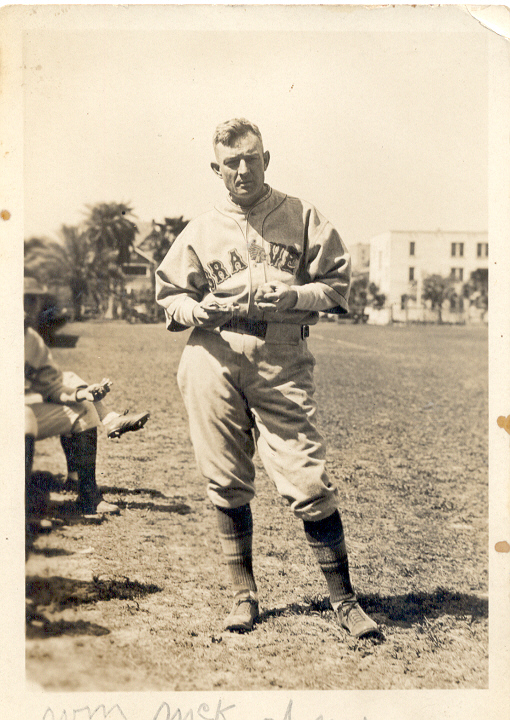
Bill McKechnie played for Indianapolis in 1914.

Federal League
Team	W	L	Pct.	GB	Home	Road
Indianapolis Hoosiers	88	65	.575	—	53‍–‍23	35‍–‍42
Chicago Federals	87	67	.565	1½	43‍–‍34	44‍–‍33
Baltimore Terrapins	84	70	.545	4½	53‍–‍26	31‍–‍44
Buffalo Buffeds	80	71	.530	7	47‍–‍29	33‍–‍42
Brooklyn Tip-Tops	77	77	.500	11½	47‍–‍32	30‍–‍45
Kansas City Packers	67	84	.444	20	37‍–‍36	30‍–‍48
Pittsburgh Rebels	64	86	.427	22½	37‍–‍37	27‍–‍49
St. Louis Terriers	62	89	.411	25	32‍–‍43	30‍–‍46

1915

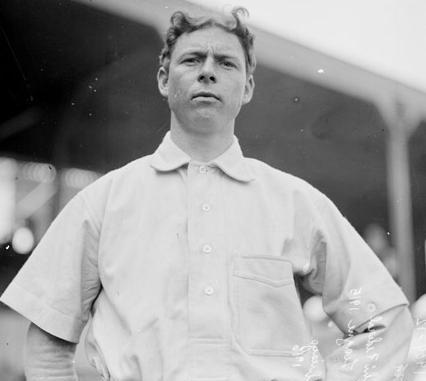
Mordecai Brown played for Chicago in 1915.

Federal League
Team	W	L	Pct.	GB	Home	Road
Chicago Whales	86	66	.566	—	44‍–‍32	42‍–‍34
St. Louis Terriers	87	67	.565	—	43‍–‍34	44‍–‍33
Pittsburgh Rebels	86	67	.562	½	45‍–‍31	41‍–‍36
Kansas City Packers	81	72	.529	5½	46‍–‍31	35‍–‍41
Newark Peppers	80	72	.526	6	40‍–‍39	40‍–‍33
Buffalo Blues	74	78	.487	12	37‍–‍40	37‍–‍38
Brooklyn Tip-Tops	70	82	.461	16	34‍–‍40	36‍–‍42
Baltimore Terrapins	47	107	.305	40	24‍–‍51	23‍–‍56

== See also ==
- Continental League
- Players' League
- Union Association

== General and cited sources ==
- Okkonen, Marc (1989). The Federal League of 1914–1915: Baseball's Third Major League. Garrett Park, Md: Society For American Baseball Research. ISBN 978-0-910137-37-9.
- Pietrusza, David (1991). The Formation, Sometimes Absorption and Mostly Inevitable Demise of 18 Professional Baseball Organizations, 1871 to Present. Jefferson, North Carolina: McFarland & Company. ISBN 0-89950-590-2.
- Wiggins, Robert Peyton (2008). The Federal League of Base Ball Clubs: The History of an Outlaw Major League. Jefferson, North Carolina: McFarland. ISBN 978-0-7864-3835-8.
