= Kansas City Packers all-time roster =

List of baseball players

The following is a list of players who appeared in at least one game for the Kansas City Packers franchise of the Federal League from 1914 through 1915.

== Keys ==
Abbreviations
| Name | Name of the player by official records |
| Position | Position that player played in the field |
| Seasons played | The seasons played for this franchise by the player |
| § | Indicates that player was a player-manager |

Position
| C | Catcher | 1B | First baseman |
| 2B | Second baseman | 3B | Third baseman |
| SS | Shortstop | IF | Infielder |
| LF | Left fielder | CF | Center fielder |
| RF | Right fielder | OF | Outfielder |
| SP | Starting pitcher | RP | Relief pitcher |

== List of players ==
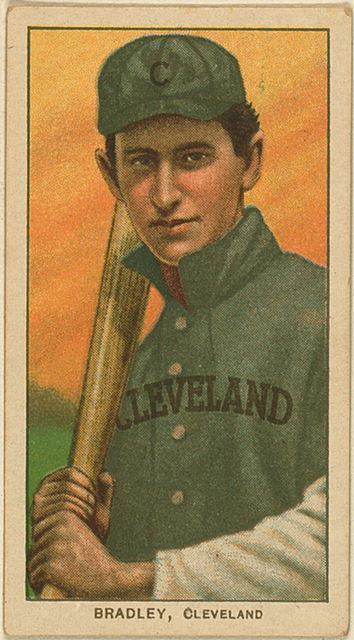
Third Baseman Bill Bradley

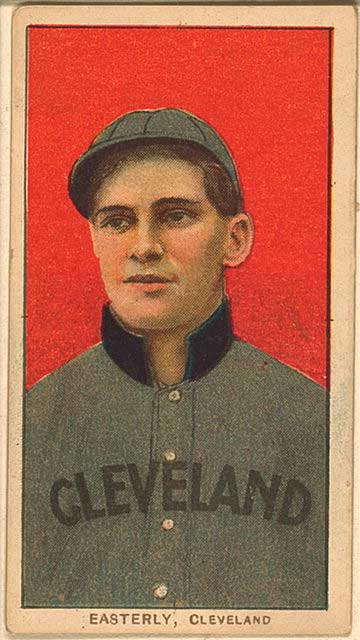
Catcher Ted Easterly

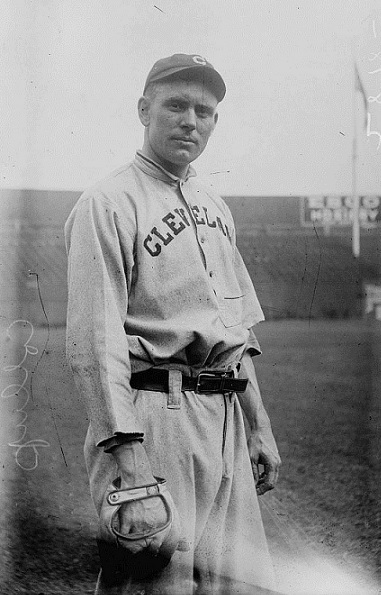
Pitcher Nick Cullop

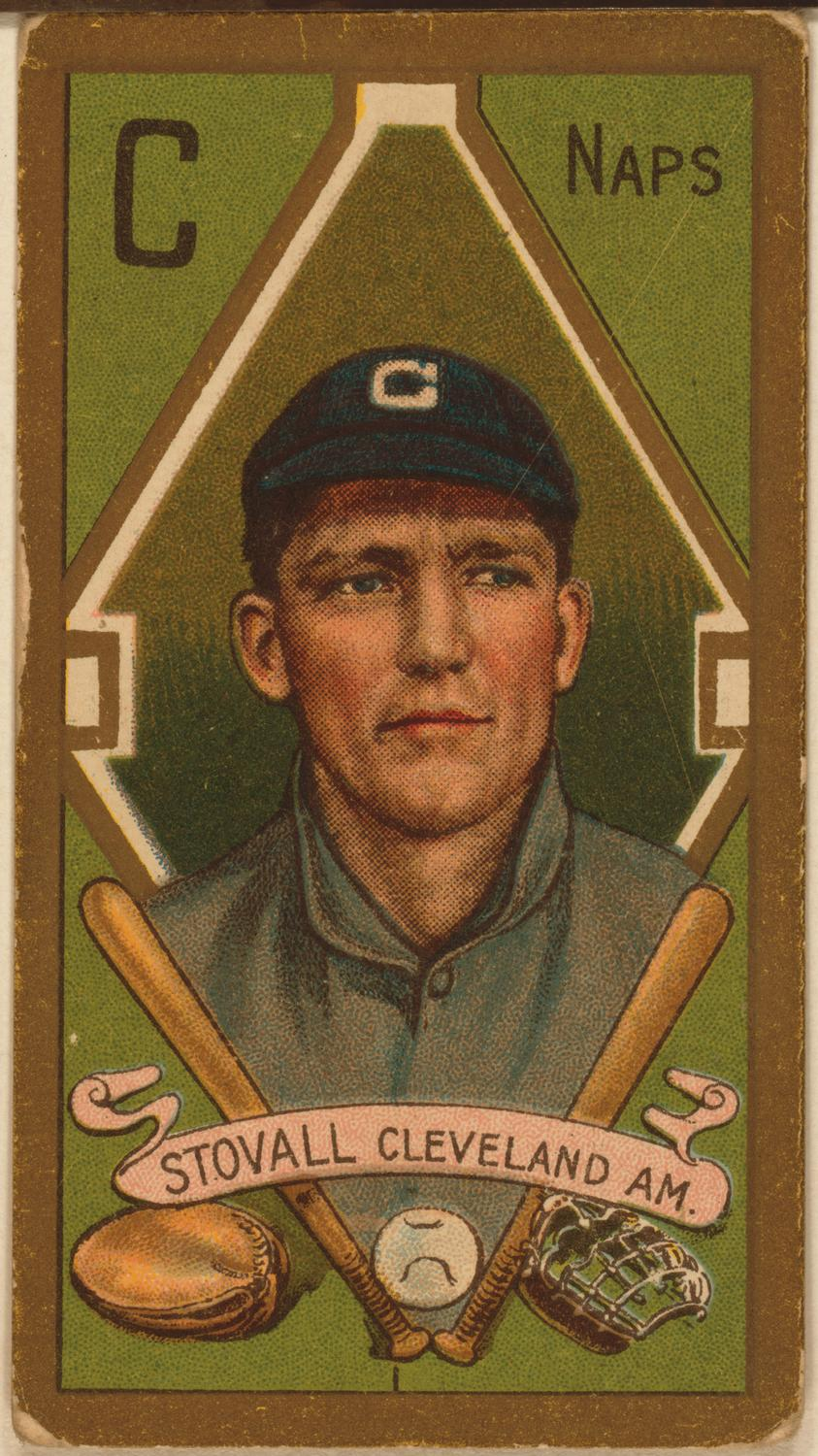
First baseman/Manager George Stovall

| Player | Position | Seasons | Notes | Ref |
|---|---|---|---|---|
| Dan Adams | P | 1914-1915 | | |
| Charlie Blackburn | P | 1915 | | |
| Bill Bradley | 3B | 1915 | | |
| Drummond Brown | C | 1914-1915 | | |
| Chet Chadbourne | OF | 1914-1915 | | |
| Cad Coles | CF | 1914 | | |
| Nick Cullop | P | 1914-1915 | | |
| Cliff Daringer | IF | 1914 | | |
| Ted Easterly | C | 1914-1915 | | |
| Jack Enzenroth | C | 1914-1915 | | |
| Grover Gilmore | RF | 1914-1915 | | |
| Joe Gingras | P | 1915 | | |
| Pep Goodwin | SS | 1914-1915 | | |
| Ben Harris | P | 1914-1915 | | |
| Pete Henning | P | 1914-1915 | | |
| George Hogan | P | 1914 | | |
| Chief Johnson | P | 1914-1915 | | |
| Bill Kenworthy | 2B | 1914-1915 | | |
| Art Kruger | OF | 1914-1915 | | |
| Alex Main | P | 1915 | | |
| Gene Packard | P | 1914-1915 | | |
| George Perring | 3B | 1914-1915 | | |
| John Potts | RFs | 1914 | | |
| Johnny Rawlings | 2B/SS | 1914-1915 | | |
| Al Shaw | OF | 1915 | | |
| Dwight Stone | P | 1914 | | |
| George Stovall § | 1B | 1914-1915 | | |
| Harry Swan | P | 1914 | | |
| Walter Tappan | IF | 1914 | | |
