= 1914 Kansas City Packers season =

1914 Kansas City Packers
- League: Federal League
- Ballpark: Gordon and Koppel Field
- City: Kansas City, Missouri
- Record: 67–84 (.444)
- League place: 6th
- Owners: S. S. Gordon, C. C. Madison
- Managers: George Stovall

The 1914 Kansas City Packers season was a season in American baseball. The Packers finished in 6th place in the Federal League, 20 games behind the Indianapolis Hoosiers.

== Regular season ==
=== Season standings ===
Federal League
Team	W	L	Pct.	GB	Home	Road
Indianapolis Hoosiers	88	65	.575	—	53‍–‍23	35‍–‍42
Chicago Federals	87	67	.565	1½	43‍–‍34	44‍–‍33
Baltimore Terrapins	84	70	.545	4½	53‍–‍26	31‍–‍44
Buffalo Buffeds	80	71	.530	7	47‍–‍29	33‍–‍42
Brooklyn Tip-Tops	77	77	.500	11½	47‍–‍32	30‍–‍45
Kansas City Packers	67	84	.444	20	37‍–‍36	30‍–‍48
Pittsburgh Rebels	64	86	.427	22½	37‍–‍37	27‍–‍49
St. Louis Terriers	62	89	.411	25	32‍–‍43	30‍–‍46

=== Record vs. opponents ===
1914 Federal League record Sources:
Team	BAL	BKF	BUF	CWH	IND	KC	PRB	SLT
Baltimore	—	9–13	14–8–1	12–10	10–12–1	12–10	10–12–2	17–5–1
Brooklyn	13–9	—	11–11–1	9–13	3–19	11–11–1	17–5–1	13–9
Buffalo	8–14–1	11–11–1	—	10–12–1	11–10	12–10–1	13–7	15–7
Chicago	10–12	13–9	12–10–1	—	13–9–1	14–8	12–10	13–9–1
Indianapolis	12–10–2	19–3	10–11	9–13–1	—	13–9–1	12–10	13–9
Kansas City	10–12	11–11	10–12–1	8–14	9–13–1	—	11–10	8–12
Pittsburgh	12–10–2	5–17	7–13–1	10–12	10–12	10–11	—	10–11–1
St. Louis	5–17–1	9–13	7–15	9–13–1	9–13	12–8	11–10	—

=== Notable transactions ===
- April 20, 1914: Chief Johnson jumped to the Packers from the Cincinnati Reds.
- May 1914: Jack Enzenroth jumped to the Packers from the St. Louis Browns.

=== Roster ===
1914 Kansas City Packers
Roster
Pitchers: Dan Adams; Nick Cullop; Ben Harris; Pete Henning; George Hogan; Chief Johnson; Gene Packard; Dwight Stone; Harry Swan	Catchers: Drummond Brown; Ted Easterly; Jack Enzenroth; Infielders: Cliff Daringer; Pep Goodwin; Bill Kenworthy; George Perring; Johnny Rawlings; George Stovall; Walter Tappan	Outfielders: Chet Chadbourne; Cad Coles; Grover Gilmore; Art Kruger; John Potts	Manager: George Stovall

== Player stats ==
=== Batting ===
==== Starters by position ====
Note: Pos = Position; G = Games played; AB = At bats; H = Hits; Avg. = Batting average; HR = Home runs; RBI = Runs batted in

Pos	Player	G	AB	H	Avg.	HR	RBI
C	Ted Easterly	134	436	146	.335	1	67
1B	George Stovall	124	450	128	.284	7	75
2B	Bill Kenworthy	146	545	173	.317	15	91
SS	Pep Goodwin	112	374	88	.235	1	32
3B	George Perring	144	496	138	.278	2	69
OF	Art Kruger	122	441	114	.259	4	47
OF	Chet Chadbourne	147	581	161	.277	1	37
OF	Grover Gilmore	139	530	152	.287	1	32

==== Other batters ====
Note: G = Games played; AB = At bats; H = Hits; Avg. = Batting average; HR = Home runs; RBI = Runs batted in

Player	G	AB	H	Avg.	HR	RBI
Cad Coles	78	194	49	.253	1	25
Johnny Rawlings	61	193	41	.212	0	15
Cliff Daringer	64	160	42	.263	0	16
John Potts	41	102	27	.265	1	9
Jack Enzenroth	26	67	12	.179	0	5
Drummond Brown	31	58	11	.190	0	5
Walter Tappan	18	39	8	.205	1	3

=== Pitching ===
==== Starting pitchers ====
Note: G = Games pitched; IP = Innings pitched; W = Wins; L = Losses; ERA = Earned run average; SO = Strikeouts

Player	G	IP	W	L	ERA	SO
Gene Packard	42	302.0	20	14	2.89	154
Nick Cullop	44	295.2	14	19	2.34	149
Chief Johnson	20	134.0	9	10	3.16	78

==== Other pitchers ====
Note: G = Games pitched; IP = Innings pitched; W = Wins; L = Losses; ERA = Earned run average; SO = Strikeouts

Player	G	IP	W	L	ERA	SO
Dwight Stone	39	186.2	8	14	4.34	88
Ben Harris	31	154.0	7	7	4.09	40
Pete Henning	28	138.0	5	10	4.83	45
Dan Adams	36	136.0	4	9	3.51	38
George Hogan	4	13.0	0	1	4.15	7

==== Relief pitchers ====
Note: G = Games pitched; W = Wins; L = Losses; SV = Saves; ERA = Earned run average; SO = Strikeouts

Player	G	W	L	SV	ERA	SO
Harry Swan	1	0	0	0	0.00	1
George Perring	1	0	0	0	13.50	0
