= 1915 Kansas City Packers season =

1915 Kansas City Packers
- League: Federal League
- Ballpark: Gordon and Koppel Field
- City: Kansas City, Missouri
- Record: 81–72 (.529)
- League place: 4th
- Owners: S. S. Gordon, Conrad H. Mann, Charles A. Baird
- Managers: George Stovall

The 1915 Kansas City Packers finished in 4th place the Federal League, 5½ games behind the Chicago Whales. After the season, both the team and the league folded.

== Regular season ==
=== Season standings ===
Federal League
Team	W	L	Pct.	GB	Home	Road
Chicago Whales	86	66	.566	—	44‍–‍32	42‍–‍34
St. Louis Terriers	87	67	.565	—	43‍–‍34	44‍–‍33
Pittsburgh Rebels	86	67	.562	½	45‍–‍31	41‍–‍36
Kansas City Packers	81	72	.529	5½	46‍–‍31	35‍–‍41
Newark Peppers	80	72	.526	6	40‍–‍39	40‍–‍33
Buffalo Blues	74	78	.487	12	37‍–‍40	37‍–‍38
Brooklyn Tip-Tops	70	82	.461	16	34‍–‍40	36‍–‍42
Baltimore Terrapins	47	107	.305	40	24‍–‍51	23‍–‍56

=== Record vs. opponents ===
1915 Federal League record Sources:
Team	BAL	BKF	BUF	CWH	KC	NWK	PRB	SLT
Baltimore	—	7–15	8–14	9–13	4–18	6–16	5–17	8–14
Brooklyn	15–7	—	9–11	7–15	11–11	12–10	9–13	7–15–1
Buffalo	14–8	11–9	—	8–14	11–11	11–11	9–13	10–12–1
Chicago	13–9	15–7	14–8	—	11–11	10–10–1	12–10–1	11–11–1
Kansas City	18–4	11–11	11–11	11–11	—	11–11	8–13	11–11
Newark	16–6	10–12	11–11	10–10–1	11–11	—	12–10–1	10–12–1
Pittsburgh	17–5	13–9	13–9	10–12–1	13–8	10–12–1	—	10–12–1
St. Louis	14–8	15–7–1	12–10–1	11–11–1	11–11	12–10–1	12–10–1	—

=== Roster ===
1915 Kansas City Packers
Roster
Pitchers: Dan Adams; Charlie Blackburn; Nick Cullop; Joe Gingras; Ben Harris; Pete Henning; Chief Johnson; Alex Main; Gene Packard	Catchers: Drummond Brown; Ted Easterly; Jack Enzenroth; Infielders: Bill Bradley; Pep Goodwin; Bill Kenworthy; George Perring; Johnny Rawlings; George Stovall	Outfielders: Chet Chadbourne; Grover Gilmore; Art Kruger; Al Shaw	Manager: George Stovall

== Player stats ==
=== Batting ===
==== Starters by position ====
Note: Pos = Position; G = Games played; AB = At bats; H = Hits; Avg. = Batting average; HR = Home runs; RBI = Runs batted in

Pos	Player	G	AB	H	Avg.	HR	RBI
C	Ted Easterly	110	309	84	.272	3	32
1B	George Stovall	130	480	111	.231	0	44
2B	Bill Kenworthy	122	396	118	.298	3	52
SS	Johnny Rawlings	120	399	86	.216	2	24
3B	George Perring	153	553	143	.259	7	67
OF	Chet Chadbourne	152	587	133	.227	1	35
OF	Al Shaw	132	448	126	.281	6	67
OF	Grover Gilmore	119	411	117	.285	1	47

==== Other batters ====
Note: G = Games played; AB = At bats; H = Hits; Avg. = Batting average; HR = Home runs; RBI = Runs batted in

Player	G	AB	H	Avg.	HR	RBI
Art Kruger	80	240	57	.238	2	26
Pep Goodwin	81	229	54	.236	0	16
Drummond Brown	77	227	55	.242	1	26
Bill Bradley	66	203	38	.187	0	9
Jack Enzenroth	14	19	3	.158	0	3

=== Pitching ===
==== Starting pitchers ====
Note: G = Games pitched; IP = Innings pitched; W = Wins; L = Losses; ERA = Earned run average; SO = Strikeouts

Player	G	IP	W	L	ERA	SO
Nick Cullop	44	302.1	22	11	2.44	111
Gene Packard	42	281.2	20	12	2.68	108
Chief Johnson	46	281.1	17	17	2.75	118
Alex Main	35	230.0	13	14	2.54	91

==== Other pitchers ====
Note: G = Games pitched; IP = Innings pitched; W = Wins; L = Losses; ERA = Earned run average; SO = Strikeouts

Player	G	IP	W	L	ERA	SO
Pete Henning	40	207.0	9	15	3.17	73
Dan Adams	11	35.0	0	2	4.63	16
Charlie Blackburn	7	15.2	0	1	8.62	7

==== Relief pitchers ====
Note: G = Games pitched; W = Wins; L = Losses; SV = Saves; ERA = Earned run average; SO = Strikeouts

Player	G	W	L	SV	ERA	SO
Joe Gingras	2	0	0	0	6.75	2
Ben Harris	1	0	0	0	0.00	0
