= Nick Cullop =

Nick Cullop may refer to:

- Nick Cullop (outfielder) (1900–1978), Major League Baseball outfielder
- Nick Cullop (pitcher) (1887–1961), Major League Baseball pitcher
