= Dwight Stone =

Dwight Stone may refer to:

- Dwight Stone (American football) (born 1964), American football wide receiver and kick returner
- Dwight Stone (baseball) (1886–1976), Major League Baseball pitcher

== See also ==
- Dwight Stones (born 1953), American television commentator and former high jumper
