= Joe Gingras =

American baseball player (1894-1947)

- Pitcher
- Born: January 10, 1894; New York, New York, U.S.
- Died: September 6, 1947 (aged 53); Jersey City, New Jersey, U.S.
- Batted: Right Threw: Right

MLB debut
- June 18, 1915, for the Kansas City Packers

Last MLB appearance
- June 26, 1915, for the Kansas City Packers

MLB statistics
- Win–loss record: 0–0
- Earned run average: 6.75
- Games pitched: 2
- Innings pitched: 4.00
- Strikeouts: 2
- Walks: 1
- Stats at Baseball Reference

Teams
- Kansas City Packers (1915)

Joseph Elzead John Gingras (January 10, 1894 – September 6, 1947) was an American pitcher in Major League Baseball who played for the Kansas City Packers of the Federal League in its 1915 season.

Gingras was drafted into the United States Army during World War I and sent to Camp Wadsworth.
