= Charlie Blackburn =

American baseball player (1895–1984)

- Pitcher
- Born: January 6, 1895; Chicago, Illinois
- Died: March 9, 1984 (aged 89); New Port Richey, Florida
- Batted: Right Threw: Right

MLB debut
- April 17, 1915, for the Kansas City Packers

Last MLB appearance
- 1915, for the Kansas City Packers

MLB statistics
- Win–loss record: 0–1
- Earned run average: 8.62
- Strikeouts: 7
- Stats at Baseball Reference

Teams
- Kansas City Packers (1915)

Foster Edwin "Charlie" Blackburn (January 6, 1895 – March 9, 1984) was a Major League Baseball pitcher who played for two seasons. He pitched for the Kansas City Packers for seven games during the 1915 Kansas City Packers season.

Until 2025, he was mistakenly believed to have pitched for the Chicago White Sox in 1921. Researchers in 2025 discovered that that pitcher was actually Verne Blackbourn.
