= Jimmy Lavender =

American baseball player (1884–1960)

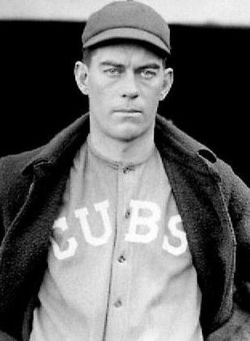
- Pitcher
- Born: March 25, 1884; Barnesville, Georgia, U.S.
- Died: January 12, 1960 (aged 75); Cartersville, Georgia, U.S.
- Batted: Right Threw: Right

MLB debut
- April 23, 1912, for the Chicago Cubs

Last MLB appearance
- October 3, 1917, for the Philadelphia Phillies

MLB statistics
- Win–loss record: 63–76
- Earned run average: 3.09
- Strikeouts: 547
- Stats at Baseball Reference

Teams
- Chicago Cubs (1912–1916); Philadelphia Phillies (1917)

Career highlights and awards
- Pitched a no-hitter on August 31, 1915

James Sanford Lavender (March 25, 1884 – January 12, 1960) was an American professional baseball player who played in Major League Baseball as a pitcher from 1912 to 1917. He played a total of five seasons with the Chicago Cubs of the National League from 1912 to 1916; after being traded to the Philadelphia Phillies, he played an additional season in 1917. During his playing days, his height was listed at 5 feet 11 inches (1.80 m), his weight as 165 pounds (75 kg), and he batted and threw right-handed. Born in Barnesville, Georgia, he began his professional baseball career in minor league baseball in 1906 at the age 22. He worked his way through the system over the next few seasons, culminating with a three-season stint with the Providence Grays of the Eastern League from 1909 to 1911.

Lavender primarily threw the spitball, and used it to win 16 games as a 28-year-old rookie in 1912. In July 1912, he defeated Rube Marquard, ending Marquard's consecutive win streak at 19 games, which at the time tied the record for the longest win streak for a pitcher in MLB history. Lavender's early success as a rookie soon turned to mediocrity as his career progressed, winning no more than 11 games in any season afterward. On August 31, 1915, he threw a no-hitter against the New York Giants.

He was traded to the Phillies before the 1917 season, and he played one season for the team, winning six games before retiring from major league baseball. Lavender returned to Georgia, worked on his farm in Montezuma, Georgia, and played professional baseball in an independent league. He died in Cartersville, Georgia at the age of 75.

== Early life ==
James Sanford Lavender was born on March 25, 1884 in Barnesville, Georgia into a wealthy family. He attended public schools until the age of 15, when he was enrolled at Gordon College, a military academy located in Barnesville. He played little baseball while there, but he did enjoy participating in football. He later attended Georgia Tech and studied mechanical engineering; he played a few games for his class' baseball team as well.

== Minor league career ==
In 1906, at the age of 22, he began his professional baseball career with the Cordele team in the class-D Georgia State League. The following season, he was promoted to the Danville Red Sox of the class-C Virginia League. On May 15, he pitched the Red Sox to a 6–2 victory over the Portsmouth Truckers, allowing just one hit. With Danville, he had a 13–16 win–loss record in 307 innings pitched. It was during this time period that a scout who worked for Connie Mack discovered Lavender, who then sent him through a training camp and assigned him to the Holyoke Papermakers of the class-B Connecticut League in 1908; he finished with a 21–17 win–loss record. From 1909 to 1911, he played with the Providence Grays of the class-A Eastern League for three seasons, winning a career-high 19 games in 1911.

It was reported on September 1, 1911 that Lavender was drafted by the Chicago Cubs in the Major League Baseball (MLB) draft. Charles Murphy, the Cubs' owner, drafted him with intent of then trading him to a Montreal minor league team as compensation for an earlier trade that brought Ward Miller to the Cubs. The Providence team owner, Frank Navin (who also owned the Detroit Tigers of the American League (AL)), appealed the transaction to the National Commission, forerunner to the modern-day Commissioner of Baseball. The commission ruled that Murphy had to either keep Lavender for one year, or return him to Providence. Murphy chose to keep Lavender, and his contract was approved on February 9, 1912 by NL president Thomas Lynch.

== Major league career ==
=== Chicago Cubs ===
==== 1912–1913 seasons ====
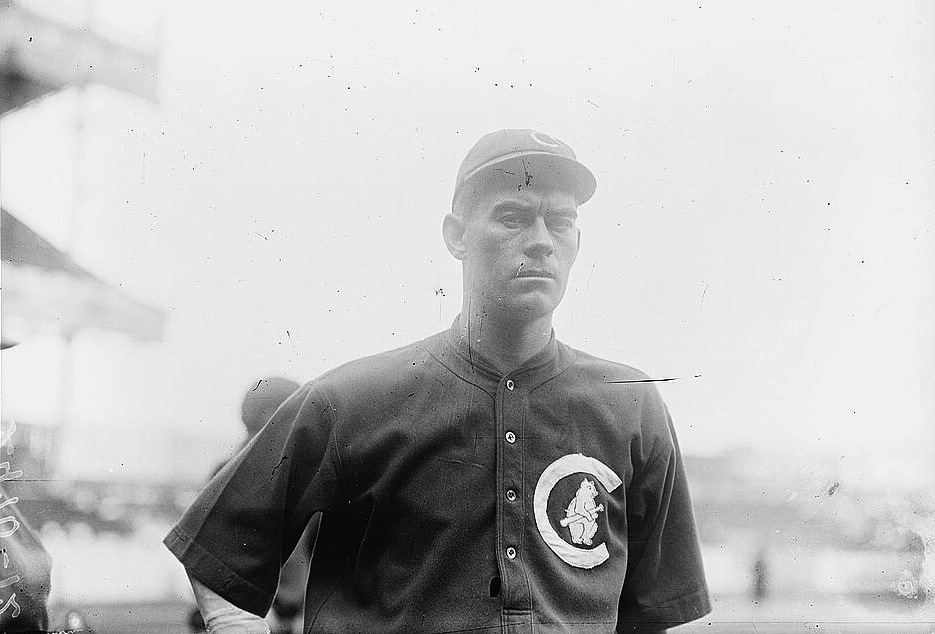
Lavender at the Polo Grounds in 1912

Lavender made his MLB debut on April 23, 1912 as a relief pitcher in a 5–3 loss to the Pittsburgh Pirates. On June 28, versus the Pirates, he threw a one-hit shutout in a 3–0 win, and collected three hits as a hitter. On July 1, he shutout Pittsburgh once more, this time in a 12-inning, 1–0 victory. He threw his third consecutive complete game shutout on July 5, a 4–0 victory over the St. Louis Cardinals. Lavender took a 33-inning consecutive scoreless inning streak into his next start, a home game against the New York Giants and pitcher Rube Marquard. He gave up five hits and defeated the Giants 7–2, ending Marquard's consecutive win streak at 19 games, which at the time tied the record for the longest streak in baseball history. The loss appeared to affect Marquard for the remainder of the season, though he regained his form in the 1912 World Series. During the 1913 season, upon the ending of an 11-game winning streak by Washington Senators pitcher Joe Boehling, Marquard commented, "I know just how Boehling feels. I know how I felt after Lavender beat me in Chicago last year after I had won nineteen straight, and I can sympathize with the Washington youngster." Lavender would have continued success against the Giants throughout his career.

Lavender's primary pitch was the spitball, and his method of preparation was to lick the ball. In a game on July 19, Lavender was about to load the ball when he smelled a liniment on the ball. He reported this to the home plate umpire, who then ejected the Phillies manager, Red Dooin, from the game. Dooin had been caught doing this to another spitballer, Marty O'Toole, a few days earlier. On September 26, Lavender and the Cubs were ahead 9–0 in the top half of the ninth inning versus Cincinnati, when the Reds scored 10 runs against Lavender and two other pitchers to take the lead 10–9. The Cubs ultimately prevailed and gained the victory by scoring two runs in the bottom half of the ninth. Lavender started just one more game in 1912, a 3–2 victory on October 5 against St. Louis. Following the season, the Cubs played a series of exhibition games with the Chicago White Sox of the American League called the City Series. (Note: The City Series was a series of exhibition games which began in 1903 with one game to determine a champion of Chicago. This series quickly grew into a series which ruled that the team who was first to four wins was declared the champion.) Lavender started the first game against Ed Walsh, and the game ended after nine innings with a scoreless tie. Lavender gave six hits and Walsh just one. After the two teams played to a 12-inning tie two days later, Lavender pitched the Cubs to victory in game three. Two additional victories gave the Cubs a 3–0 series lead, but the White Sox were able to win four straight games, twice defeating Lavender, including in the series finale. He completed his rookie season with his career-high 16 victories, against 13 losses, and a 3.04 earned run average (ERA) in 251 2/3 innings pitched.

To begin the 1913 season, Lavender was the team's opening day starting pitcher in a 5–3 loss to St. Louis on April 12. After his successful rookie season, he was largely ineffective in the first half of 1913 season; so much so that manager Johnny Evers was contemplating putting Lavender on waivers if he had not regained his form from the previous season. Lavender showed signs of improvement, surrendering just three hits in a 12–2 victory over the Pittsburgh Pirates on June 30, followed by a 5–1 win over the Reds on July 3. This rebound was short-lived, however; Chicago lost his next four starts before a 6–5 win over the Boston Braves on July 27. He pitched in 40 games, half of which were in relief, and had a 10–14 win–loss record. His ERA increased to 3.66, and he led the NL in hit batsmen with 13.

==== 1914–1916 seasons ====
His initial appearance of the 1914 season was in relief on April 17, a game in which he pitched 4 2/3 innings, and gave up three runs in 6–5 victory over the Reds. He followed that with two consecutive strong games as the starting pitcher, allowing just one unearned run in each game; the second was a complete game against the Reds. On June 12, he started the game against New York, only to be injured in the third inning when he was hit in the hand by a ball batted by Fred Merkel, and had to leave the game. The injury did not cause Lavender to lose much playing time. He pitched a four-inning relief appearance on June 19, followed by a complete-game shutout on June 27 against the Reds. On August 17, he pitched a second shutout during the season, a 3-0 victory over the Brooklyn Robins.

Lavender created a controversy in a game on September 23, when he was caught altering the baseball by rubbing it against an emery board that he had attached to his uniform's pant leg, an illegal act. At the time, the fine for such an infraction was a five-dollar fine. The Phillies players noticed that the pitcher was constantly scratching the side of his leg. They asked the umpire to search the pitcher. Lavender refused to be searched and ran into the outfield, and the umpire refused to chase Lavender. Eventually, a particularly fast Phillies player, Hans Lobert, was able to catch up with him and grab the offending item. As a result of this incident, AL president, Ban Johnson, decreed that any pitcher in his league caught using sandpaper to alter the baseball, would be suspended for 30 days and fined $100. This rule became the forebear of the rule banning other pitches as well, including the spitball. In his 37 games pitched in 1914, 28 were as the starting pitcher. His win–loss record was 11–11, and he lowered his ERA down to 3.07 in 214 1/3 innings pitched.

Lavender got off to quick start in 1915, pitching a complete-game victory against St. Louis on April 16. He then missed time due to suffering a broken rib attempting to climb out of a bathtub. His next appearance was not until May 7, when he pitched two innings in relief. He regained his starting role on May 21, hurling his second complete-game victory of the season, this time against Boston. In the first game of a doubleheader on August 31, Lavender threw a no-hitter against the New York Giants, a 2–0 victory. He struck out eight batters and walked just one. At the conclusion of the season, the Cubs played the Chicago White Sox of the American League in an exhibition series. Lavender pitched a shutout in game two, but the White Sox were declared victors after winning four games to the Cubs' one. His totals for the 1915 season included 41 games pitched, a 10–16 win–loss record, a career-low 2.58 ERA, and a career-high 117 strikeouts.

Though Lavender seemed to pitch well to begin the 1916 season, his record of 1–6 though June 10 was a direct contrast to his low 2.89 ERA. In his next start, against the Giants on June 14, he allowed only an infield single to Benny Kauff. The New York Sun noted that Kauff's single was as a result of a ground ball that took a bad hop and bounced away from the fielder. Lavender continued to pitch well throughout the season, both starting and in relief, culminating with a complete-game shutout against Pittsburgh on September 9, his fourth shutout of the season. However, in his last four appearances, he was credited with the loss in three, and his ERA rose from 2.05 to 2.83. His season win–loss record was 10–14 in 36 games and 188 innings pitched.

=== Philadelphia Phillies ===
==== 1917 season ====
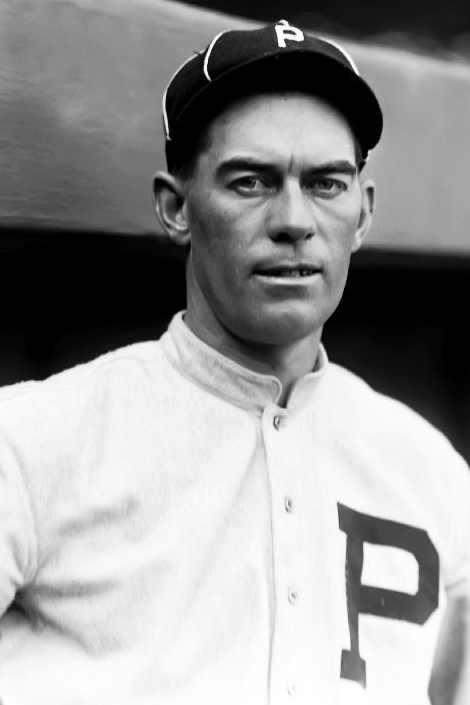
Lavender with the Philadelphia Phillies

On December 19, 1916, it was reported that during the NL meetings, Chicago had traded Lavender's rights to the Phillies for pitcher Al Demaree. However, it was not official until April 2, 1917, with Chicago sending an additional $5,000 to complete the deal. In March, Lavender signed with Philadelphia. He made his Philadelphia debut on April 27, pitching a complete-game victory against the Giants, allowing five hits and one run. Lavender faced his former club, the Cubs, for the first time on May 19, and pitched the last three innings for the victory. At this point in the season, he was pitching well, his ERA was 1.57 and he had a 2–1 win–loss record.

He soon began to falter, giving up four earned runs in four innings against the Cubs on May 22 and losing consecutive starts against New York and Pittsburgh. Then in a start against Cincinnati, he surrendered 15 hits and seven earned runs; his ERA had now risen to 3.29. He had regained his form over the course of the months of July and August, lowering his ERA to 2.69 after his game on September 8. He lost much of his effectiveness later, however, allowing 14 hits and 10 earned runs against Boston on September 10, and three more runs against Brooklyn in five relief innings on September 13. After a short one-inning appearance on September 25, he started the game on October 3 against the Giants. He gave up five earned runs in five innings pitched and received the loss. It was his last major league appearance. In his one season with Philadelphia, he pitched in 28 games, and had a 6–8 record. His final career record was 63–76, with a 3.09 ERA and 547 strikeouts in 1,207 innings pitched.

During the off-season, Philadelphia planned to trade or sell Lavender, even though he had earlier announced his retirement from the game. Philadelphia's asking price for his rights was $1,000, but they received no offers. Christy Mathewson, manager of the Reds, was reported to have had interest in Lavender, the pitcher's success against the Giants still fresh in Mathewson's mind. Though Philadelphia had a meeting with Cincinnati, Mathewson was unable to attend, and no trade discussions materialized. The San Francisco Seals of the Pacific Coast League expressed interest in Lavender, but he stressed that he was retired and that he would only consider a trade to Atlanta of the Southern Association so that he could be near his farm in Montezuma. In 1922, it was reported that he signed with Atlanta after playing well for an independent team in Dawson, Georgia.

== Post-baseball life ==
After his playing career ended, Lavender returned to Georgia and worked on his farm in Montezuma, Georgia. He died on January 12, 1960, at the age of 75, in Cartersville, Georgia, and is interred at Felton Cemetery in Montezuma.

== In popular culture ==
Author Vincent Starrett, who penned The Private Life of Sherlock Holmes, created a series of short stories featuring a gentlemanly, cultured detective named "Jimmie Lavender". Starrett stated that the name was perfect for his character, and received permission from the former pitcher for use of the name. A collection of these stories were featured in the 1944 book The Case Book of Jimmie Lavender.

== See also ==
- List of Major League Baseball no-hitters

== Notes ==
Preceded by Alex Main	No-hitter pitcher August 31, 1915	Succeeded by Dave Davenport
