= Verne Blackbourn =

American baseball player (1895–1990)

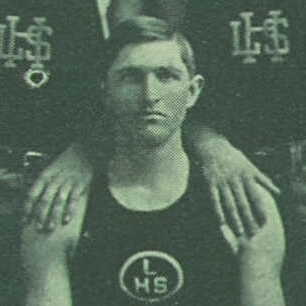
- Blackbourn c. 1915
- Pitcher
- Born: April 25, 1895; Beetown, Wisconsin, U.S.
- Died: May 14, 1990 (aged 95); Beetown, Wisconsin, U.S.
- Batted: Unknown Threw: Right

MLB debut
- September 2, 1921, for the Chicago White Sox

Last MLB appearance
- September 2, 1921, for the Chicago White Sox

MLB statistics
- Win–loss record: 0–0
- Earned run average: 0.00
- Strikeouts: 0
- Stats at Baseball Reference

Teams
- Chicago White Sox (1921)

Laverne Ellsworth Blackbourn (Note: His first name was also written as Lavern, LaVerne, LaVern, Verne and Vern. His last name was also written as Blackbourne, Blackburn and Blackburne.) (April 25, 1895 – May 14, 1990) was an American professional baseball pitcher. In 1921, he pitched in one game for the Chicago White Sox.

Until late 2025, his stint with the 1921 White Sox was mistakenly attributed to pitcher Charlie Blackburn.

== Early life ==
Blackbourn grew up on his father's large farm on the Grant River in southwestern Wisconsin which had been in the family since approximately 1866. He had a sister, Geneva, and a brother, Lisle Blackbourn. In 1915, Blackbourn graduated from a high school in Lancaster, Wisconsin, with 16 other students.

== Baseball career ==
Blackbourn appears to have begun his baseball career by playing for local teams in Grant County, Wisconsin. In 1917, he pitched for a team representing Lancaster which included his brother as an outfielder. By 1921, according to the Grant County Herald, Blackbourn had been playing baseball "for years ... all over the country." On August 14, 1921, Blackbourn was pitching for an independent team in South Haven, Michigan when he struck out 21 batters during a game against a team representing Watervliet, Michigan. Shortly thereafter, Charles Comiskey of the White Sox sent a letter to the South Haven club notifying them that the White Sox were interested in sending scouts to watch Blackbourn pitch in some upcoming games. By August 31, the White Sox signed him for a trial.

=== Chicago White Sox ===
Blackbourn appeared in the only major league game of his career on September 2, 1921 against the St. Louis Browns at Chicago's Comiskey Park. He entered the game in the ninth inning in relief of Roy Wilkinson and retired the first two batters, Frank Ellerbe and George Sisler, on ground balls. The next batter, Ken Williams, reached on an error by second baseman Eddie Collins. Williams was then able to steal second base standing up, suggesting to James Crusinberry of the Chicago Tribune that he "may lack some of the artistic things a big league hurler must know." He then allowed a base on balls to Baby Doll Jacobson and allowed Williams to steal third base on the same pitch before retiring Hank Severeid for the final out of a scoreless ninth inning. However, the Browns ultimately defeated the White Sox on the strength of Urban Shocker's shutout. Australian golfer Joe Kirkwood Sr. was in attendance at the game, along with golfer Bob MacDonald, "just to see what baseball is all about."

=== Post-White Sox career ===
Within four days of his cup of coffee in the American League, Blackbourn was back home in Wisconsin and pitching for a local team in Lancaster. In the summer of 1922, he returned to pitch in South Haven. In April 1923, he was announced as a coach of the new baseball team at Lawrence College in Appleton, Wisconsin. At the time, his brother was the captain of Lawrence's football team. In 1923 and 1924, he was reportedly intending to play for the Appleton club in the wisconsin State League but wound up pitching for a team in Merrill, Wisconsin outside of organized baseball. In April 1925, he was reported to have signed with the Bloomington, Illinois club of the Three-I League but instead pitched for the Dubuque, Iowa club in the same league. In 1926, he played for a team representing Hackett, Wisconsin. He started the 1927 season pitching in Bloomington, Wisconsin before organizing, pitching for and managing a team representing North Andover, Wisconsin which was also described as the "West Grant" team. He continued in that role through at least 1929. In 1932, he pitched for a team in Cassville and, by 1933, he was serving as player-manager of the same team.

== Later life ==
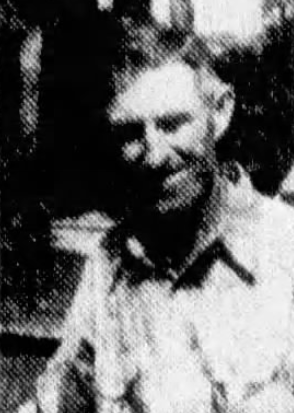
Blackbourn c. 1949

During his baseball career, Blackbourn also engaged in farming. In 1934, he was elected as a constable in Beetown. In 1935, Blackbourn's father died and Blackbourn took over his Aberdeen Angus ranch. He spent the next several decades breeding cattle. He served as president of local Aberdeen Angus associations. As of 1949, his ranch was 287 acres (116 ha) and held 20 Angus cows, 32 Shropshire sheep and 10–12 brood sows, usually crossbreeds of Duroc pigs and Poland Chinas.

In 1961, he was injured in a farming accident when his clothes were caught in a power take-off; he suffered a seriously broken arm, crushed ribs and chest injuries. When first responders crashed into a ditch on the way to the farm, his nephew, Lisle Jr., rushed him to the hospital. At the time, he and his sister, Geneva, were living together on the farm while his brother's family was living across the street.

He died in 1990.
