= John Potts (baseball) =

American baseball player (1887-1962)

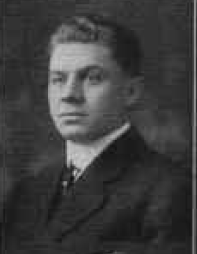
- Right fielder
- Born: February 6, 1887; Tipp City, Ohio, U.S.
- Died: September 5, 1962 (aged 75); Cleveland, Ohio, U.S.
- Batted: Left Threw: Right

MLB debut
- April 18, 1914, for the Kansas City Packers

Last MLB appearance
- September 2, 1914, for the Kansas City Packers

MLB statistics
- Batting average: .265
- Home runs: 1
- Runs batted in: 9
- Stats at Baseball Reference

Teams
- Kansas City Packers (1914)

John Frederick Potts (February 6, 1887 – September 5, 1962) was an American Major League Baseball right fielder who played for the Kansas City Packers of the Federal League in 1914.
