= George Hogan (baseball) =

American baseball player (1885-1922)

- Pitcher
- Born: September 25, 1885; Marion, Ohio, US
- Died: February 22, 1922 (aged 36); Bartlesville, Oklahoma, US
- Batted: Right Threw: Right

MLB debut
- April 18, 1914, for the Kansas City Packers

Last MLB appearance
- May 6, 1914, for the Kansas City Packers

MLB statistics
- Win–loss record: 0–1
- Earned run average: 4.15
- Strikeouts: 7
- Stats at Baseball Reference

Teams
- Kansas City Packers (1914)

George Augustine Hogan (September 25, 1885 – February 22, 1922) was an American professional baseball pitcher who played with the Kansas City Packers of the Federal League in 1914.
