= Walter Tappan =

American baseball player

- Infielder
- Born: October 8, 1890; Carlinville, Illinois, US
- Died: December 19, 1967 (aged 77); Lynwood, California, US
- Batted: Right Threw: Right

MLB debut
- April 16, 1914, for the Kansas City Packers

Last MLB appearance
- July 15, 1914, for the Kansas City Packers

MLB statistics
- Batting average: .205
- Home runs: 1
- Runs batted in: 3
- Stats at Baseball Reference

Teams
- Kansas City Packers (1914)

Walter Van Dorn "Tap" Tappan (October 8, 1890 in Carlinville, Illinois – December 19, 1967 in Lynwood, California) was a Major League Baseball infielder who played for the Kansas City Packers of the Federal League in 1914.
