= George Stovall =

American baseball player and manager (1877-1951)

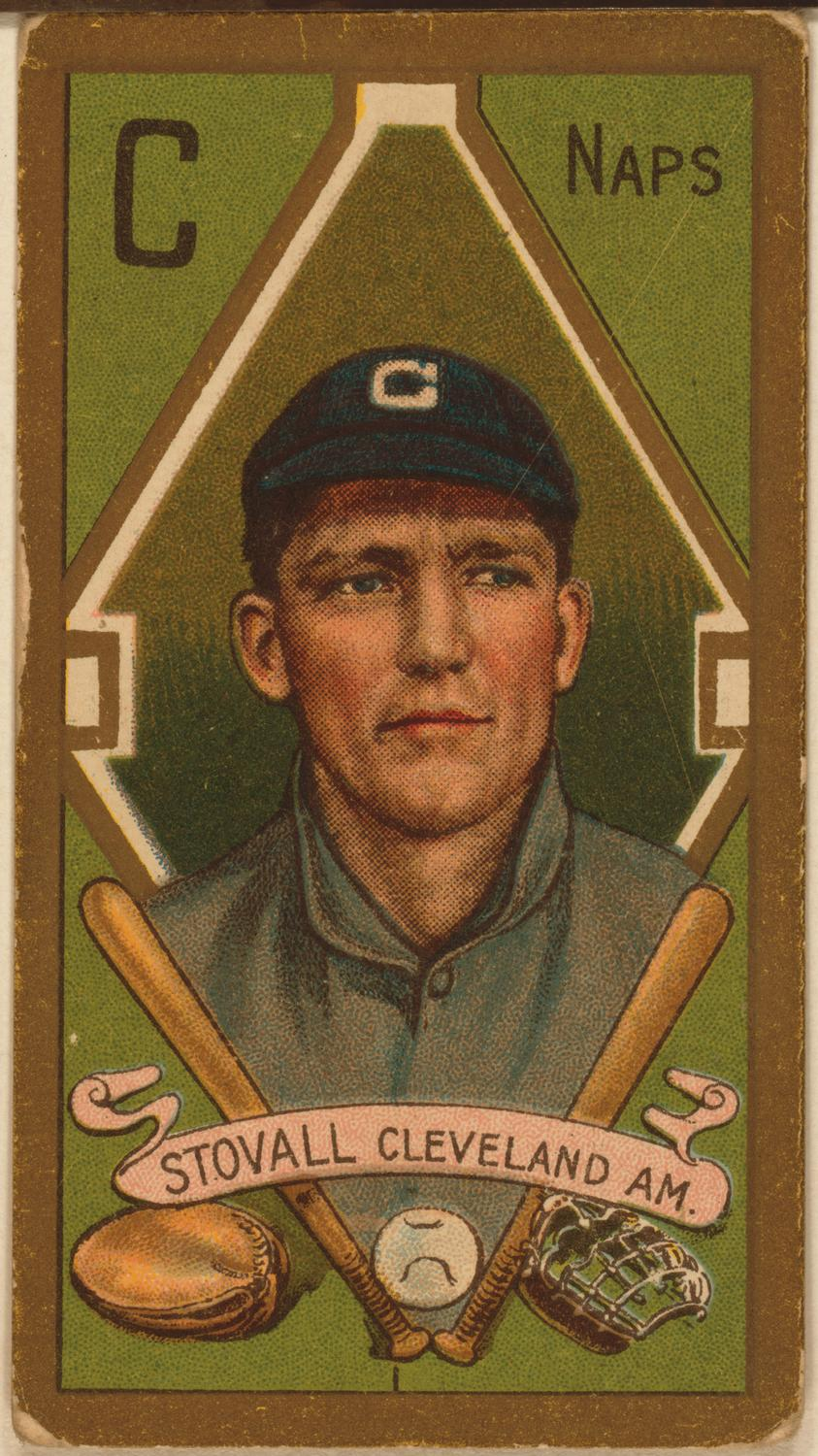
- George T. Stovall baseball card
- First baseman
- Born: November 23, 1877; Leeds, Missouri, U.S.
- Died: November 15, 1951 (aged 73); Burlington, Iowa, U.S.
- Batted: Right Threw: Right

MLB debut
- July 4, 1904, for the Cleveland Naps

Last MLB appearance
- October 3, 1915, for the Kansas City Packers

MLB statistics
- Batting average: .265
- Home runs: 15
- Runs batted in: 564
- Stats at Baseball Reference

Teams
- As player: Cleveland Naps (1904–1911); St. Louis Browns (1912–1913); Kansas City Packers (1914–1915); As manager: Cleveland Naps (1911); St. Louis Browns (1912–1913); Kansas City Packers (1914–1915)

George Thomas Stovall (November 23, 1877 – November 5, 1951), nicknamed "Firebrand", was an American first baseman in Major League Baseball. He played for the Cleveland Naps and the St. Louis Browns in the American League, and he also played two seasons with the Kansas City Packers of the short-lived Federal League. He was the manager of the Naps for one season in 1911, and in 1912, he went to the Browns, serving as player-manager for two seasons. In 1914, he jumped to the Packers as a first baseman-manager. In 1916, he signed with the Toledo Mud Hens and played a season there before retiring from baseball at age 39.

In 5596 career at bats, Stovall had 1382 hits. He recorded 231 doubles and 142 career stolen bases. While for the most part a first baseman, he did play some second base and even third base, especially early in his career. In 1905, he played 46 of his 112 games at second. Every year from 1905 until 1910, Stovall recorded at least 13 stolen bases.

In late 1913, Stovall was suspended by the American League for spitting tobacco juice at an umpire. However, league president Ban Johnson did not think this went far enough, and ordered Stovall fired. He was succeeded by the relatively little-known (at the time) Branch Rickey.

His elder brother, Jesse Stovall, pitched two seasons in the major leagues.

== Managerial record ==
Team	Year	Regular season					Postseason			
Team	Year	Games	Won	Lost	Win %	Finish	Won	Lost	Win %	Result
CLE	1911	136	74	62	.200	3rd in AL	–	–	–	–
CLE total		136	74	62	.544		0	0	–	
SLB	1912	117	43	74	.368	7th in AL	–	–	–	–
SLB	1913	132	48	84	.364	Fired	–	–	–	–
SLB total		249	91	158	.365		0	0	–	
KCP	1914	151	67	84	.444	8th in FL	–	–	–	–
KCP	1915	153	81	72	.529	4th in FL	–	–	–	–
KCP total		304	148	156	.487		0	0	–	
Total		689	313	376	.454		0	0	–	

== See also ==
- List of Major League Baseball player–managers
