= Al Shaw (outfielder) =

American baseball player (1881–1974)

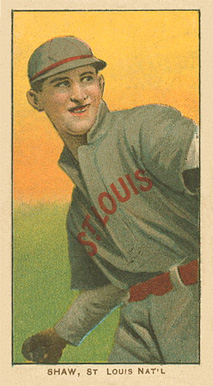
- Outfielder
- Born: March 1, 1881; Toledo, Illinois, U.S.
- Died: December 30, 1974 (aged 93); Danville, Illinois, U.S.
- Batted: Left Threw: Right

MLB debut
- September 28, 1907, for the St. Louis Cardinals

Last MLB appearance
- October 3, 1915, for the Kansas City Packers

MLB statistics
- Batting average: .281
- Home runs: 14
- Runs batted in: 170
- Stats at Baseball Reference

Teams
- St. Louis Cardinals (1907–09); Brooklyn Tip-Tops (1914); Kansas City Packers (1915)

Albert Simpson Shaw (March 1, 1881 – December 30, 1974) was an American professional baseball player. He played all or part of five seasons in Major League Baseball, from 1907 to 1909 and 1914 to 1915. He was an outfielder for 418 of his 423 games played.

He finished his career with a .281 batting average, getting 434 hits in 1547 at bats. Shaw recorded 74 doubles and 28 triples, while hitting 14 home runs in 4+ seasons.

== Sources ==
- Career statistics from Baseball Reference, or Baseball Reference (Minors)
