= Nick Cullop (outfielder) =

American baseball player (1900–1978)

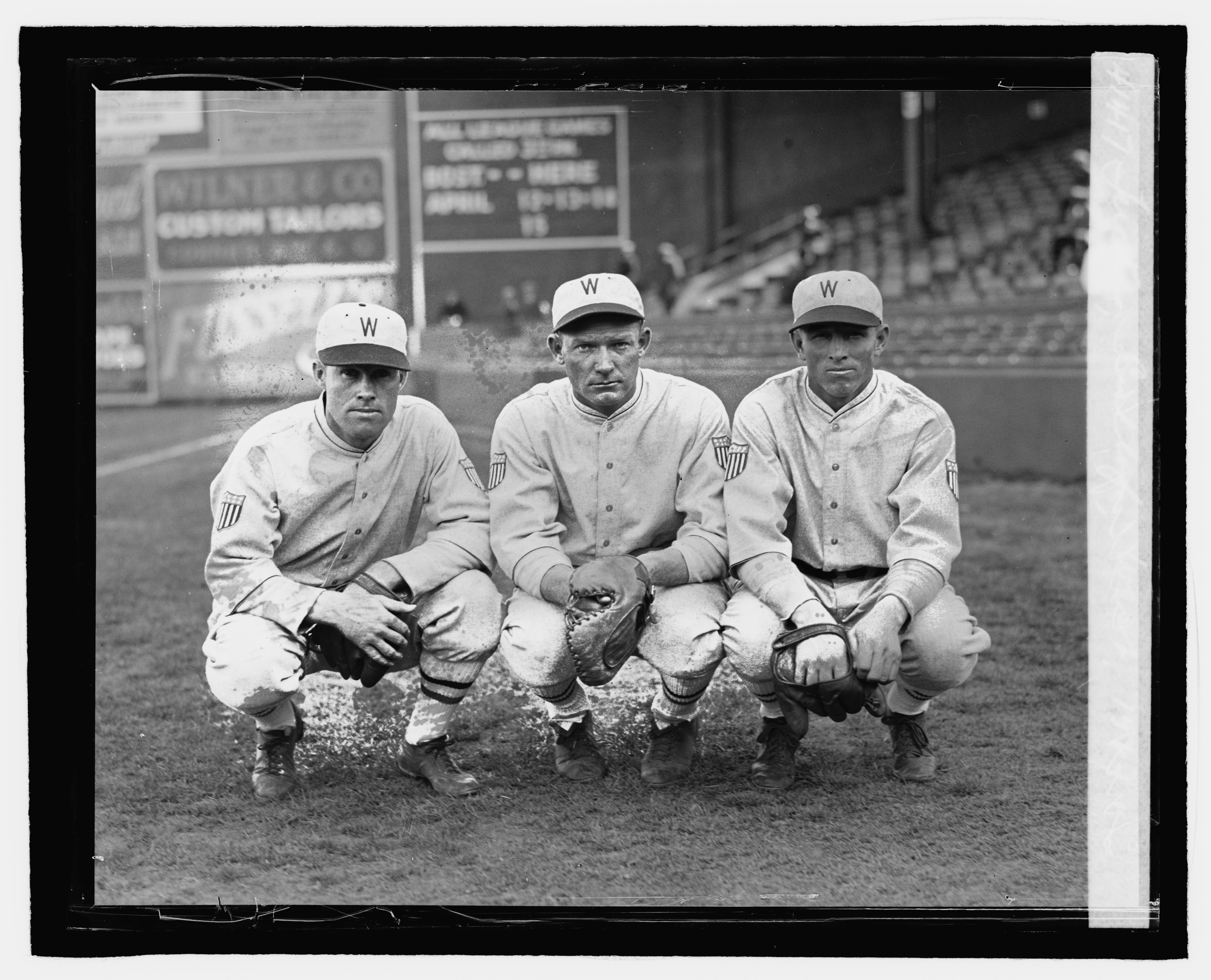
- Outfielder
- Born: Heinrich Nicholas Kohlhepp; October 16, 1900; Weldon Spring, Missouri, U.S.
- Died: December 8, 1978 (aged 78); Westerville, Ohio, U.S.
- Batted: Right Threw: Right

MLB debut
- April 14, 1926, for the New York Yankees

Last MLB appearance
- September 27, 1931, for the Cincinnati Reds

MLB statistics
- Batting average: .249
- Home runs: 11
- Runs batted in: 67
- Stats at Baseball Reference

Teams
- New York Yankees (1926); Washington Senators (1927); Cleveland Indians (1927); Brooklyn Robins (1929); Cincinnati Reds (1930–1931)

Henry Nicholas Cullop (born Heinrich Nicholas Kohlhepp; October 16, 1900 – December 8, 1978) was an American professional baseball outfielder in Major League Baseball during the 1920s and 1930s. Cullop was better known, however, as a feared batsman in minor league baseball and as a longtime manager at the minor league level. He is the all-time minor league RBI king. Cullop was nicknamed "Tomato Face" because his face turned bright red whenever he got angry. He is not related to pitcher Nick Cullop.

== Biography ==
Born in Weldon Spring, Missouri, Cullop batted and threw right-handed, stood 6 feet (1.8 m) tall and weighed 200 pounds (91 kg). He began his professional career as a pitcher, second baseman and outfielder for the Madison Greys of the Class D South Dakota League in 1920, hitting .341 in 66 games. Although he was primarily an outfielder, Cullop continued to pitch sporadically through 1927, compiling a 49–50 record in 140 minor league games.

However, Cullop made his name as a batter. In 1924, he swatted 40 home runs and compiled 155 runs batted in with the Omaha Buffaloes of the Class A Western League; the following season, 1925, he led the Southern Association with 30 home runs as a member of the Atlanta Crackers. His prodigious hitting led to major league trials with the New York Yankees, Washington Senators, Cleveland Indians, Brooklyn Robins and Cincinnati Reds (1926–1927; 1929–1931). In 173 games over all or parts of those seasons, Cullop batted only .249 with 122 hits, 29 doubles, 12 triples, 11 home runs and 67 RBI.

But at the minor league level, he was a terror. Cullop's best season was in 1930 with the Minneapolis Millers of the American Association. He batted .359 and led the Association in runs scored (150), homers (54) and RBI (152). He played through 1944, and overall he batted .312, made 2,670 hits, slugged 420 homers and drove in 1,857 RBI in 2,484 minor league games.

He began a 17-year minor league managing career with the Asheville Tourists of the Class B Piedmont League in 1941. He won two regular-season pennants and three playoff championships in leagues ranging from Class C to Triple-A before he retired from managing in 1959.

Cullop died on December 8, 1978, in Westerville, Ohio.
