= Alex Main =

American baseball player (1884–1965)

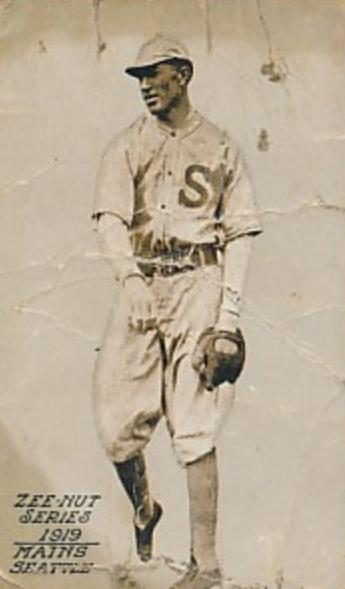
- Pitcher
- Born: May 13, 1884; Montrose, Michigan, U.S.
- Died: December 29, 1965 (aged 81); Royal Oak, Michigan, U.S.
- Batted: Left Threw: Right

MLB debut
- April 18, 1914, for the Detroit Tigers

Last MLB appearance
- June 29, 1918, for the Philadelphia Phillies

MLB statistics
- Win–loss record: 21–22
- Earned run average: 2.77
- Strikeouts: 160
- Stats at Baseball Reference

Teams
- Detroit Tigers (1914); Kansas City Packers (1915); Philadelphia Phillies (1918)

Miles Grant "Alex" Main (May 13, 1884 – December 29, 1965) was an American professional baseball pitcher who played from 1914 to 1915 and in 1918 for the Detroit Tigers, Kansas City Packers and Philadelphia Phillies.

A 30-year-old rookie, Main began his big league career on April 18, 1914, for the Tigers. With them, he appeared in 32 games, starting 12 of them. He went 6–6 with a 2.67 ERA, completing five games and saving three. His three saves ranked sixth in the league.

The following season, he became the second Tiger pitcher to jump to the short-lived Federal League, the first being Ed Willett. He played for the Packers that season. Although his ERA of 2.54 was third best on the team and he gave up only 181 hits in 230 innings, his record was only 13–14. He had the worst record on the team among all pitchers with at least 25 games started. Despite that, his 1.113 WHIP was fifth best in the league, and his 7.08 hits per nine innings ratio ranked second. His three saves were eighth best in the league that season. On August 16 of that season, he threw the first no-hitter in Federal League Park history.

Main did not play in the Major Leagues in either 1916 or 1917, but in 1918 he appeared in eight games for the Phillies. Making four starts, he went 2–2 with a 4.63 ERA. He played his final big league game on June 29.

Overall, Main went 21–22 with a 2.77 ERA in 75 career games (44 starts). He allowed only 342 hits in 403 1/3 innings. As a hitter, he hit .157 in 127 at-bats.

Following his death, he was buried at Crestwood Memorial Cemetery in Grand Blanc, Michigan.

== See also ==
- List of Major League Baseball no-hitters

Preceded by Claude Hendrix	No-hitter pitcher August 16, 1915	Succeeded by Jimmy Lavender
