= Harry Swan =

American baseball player (1887-1946)

- Pitcher
- Born: August 11, 1887; Lancaster, Pennsylvania
- Died: May 9, 1946 (aged 58); Pittsburgh, Pennsylvania
- Batted: Right Threw: Right

MLB debut
- April 28, 1914, for the Kansas City Packers

Last MLB appearance
- April 28, 1914, for the Kansas City Packers

MLB statistics
- Games pitched: 1
- Earned run average: 0.00
- Strikeouts: 1
- Stats at Baseball Reference

Teams
- Kansas City Packers (1914)

Harry Gordon Swan (August 11, 1887 – May 9, 1946) was a professional baseball pitcher who played for the Kansas City Packers of the Federal League. Swan played in only one Major League Baseball game in his career on April 2, 1914. He pitched one inning, allowing no hits, one base on balls, and striking out one batter.
