= Cad Coles =

American baseball player (1886-1942)

- Outfielder
- Born: January 17, 1886; Rock Hill, South Carolina, U.S.
- Died: June 30, 1942 (aged 56); Miami, Florida, U.S.
- Batted: Left Threw: Right

MLB debut
- April 16, 1914, for the Kansas City Packers

Last MLB appearance
- September 29, 1914, for the Kansas City Packers

MLB statistics
- Batting average: .253
- Home runs: 1
- hits: 49
- Stats at Baseball Reference

Teams
- Kansas City Packers (1914)

Cadwallader "Cad" Coles (January 17, 1886 – June 30, 1942) was an American outfielder who played for the Kansas City Packers of the Federal League in 1914.

Coles was the first player sold from one Federal League team to another, having been sent from the Chicago Whales to Kansas City before the start of the 1914 season.

Coles grew up on a plantation in South Carolina and attended Clemson College where he played for Clemson's baseball team. He left his professional baseball career to work on ships and spent years as a purser for the P & O Steamship Company before dying of a heart attack at his Miami, Florida home in 1942 at the age of 56.
