= George Perring =

American baseball player (1884-1960)

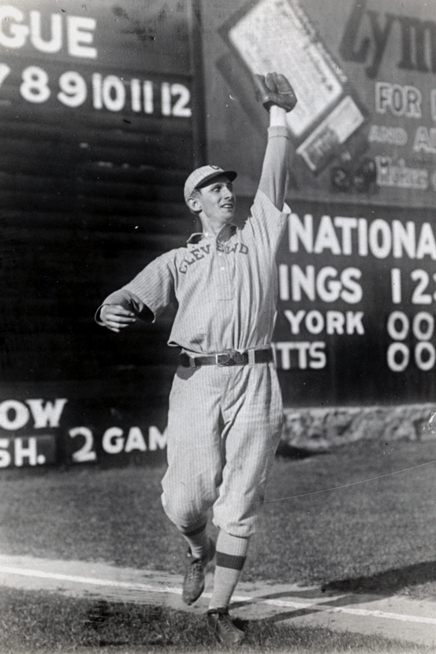
- Third baseman
- Born: August 13, 1884; Sharon, Wisconsin
- Died: August 20, 1960 (aged 76); Beloit, Wisconsin
- Batted: Right Threw: Right

MLB debut
- April 25, 1908, for the Cleveland Naps

Last MLB appearance
- October 3, 1915, for the Kansas City Packers

MLB statistics
- Batting average: .248
- Home runs: 9
- Runs batted in: 183
- Stats at Baseball Reference

Teams
- Cleveland Naps (1908–1910); Kansas City Packers (1914–15)

George Wilson Perring (August 13, 1884 – August 20, 1960) was a Major League Baseball third baseman who played for five seasons. He played for the Cleveland Naps from 1908 to 1910 and the Kansas City Packers of the Federal League from 1914 to 1915.

Perring was born in Sharon, Wisconsin and died, and is buried, in Beloit, Wisconsin. He attended Beloit College.
