= Bill Bradley (baseball) =

American baseball player and manager (1878–1954)

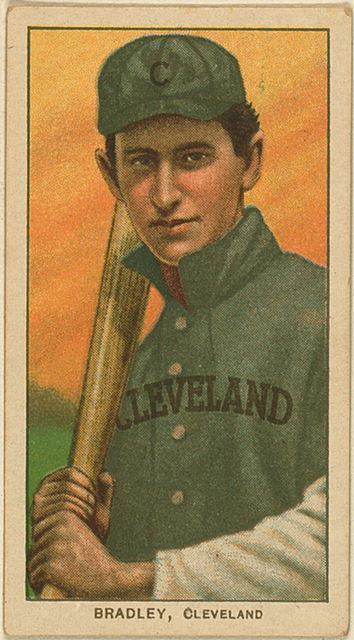
- Third baseman / Manager
- Born: February 13, 1878; Cleveland, Ohio, U.S.
- Died: March 11, 1954 (aged 76); Cleveland, Ohio, U.S.
- Batted: Right Threw: Right

MLB debut
- August 26, 1899, for the Chicago Orphans

Last MLB appearance
- September 28, 1915, for the Kansas City Packers

MLB statistics
- Batting average: .271
- Home runs: 34
- Runs batted in: 552
- Managerial record: 97–98
- Winning %: .497
- Stats at Baseball Reference
- Managerial record at Baseball Reference

Teams
- As player: Chicago Orphans (1899–1900); Cleveland Blues / Bronchos / Naps (1901–1910); Brooklyn Tip-Tops (1914); Kansas City Packers (1915); As manager: Cleveland Naps (1905); Brooklyn Tip-Tops (1914)

Career highlights and awards
- Cleveland Guardians Hall of Fame

William Joseph Bradley (February 13, 1878 – March 11, 1954) was an American third baseman and manager in Major League Baseball (MLB). He is recognized as one of the best third basemen in baseball prior to 1950, along with Jimmy Collins and Pie Traynor.

== Career ==
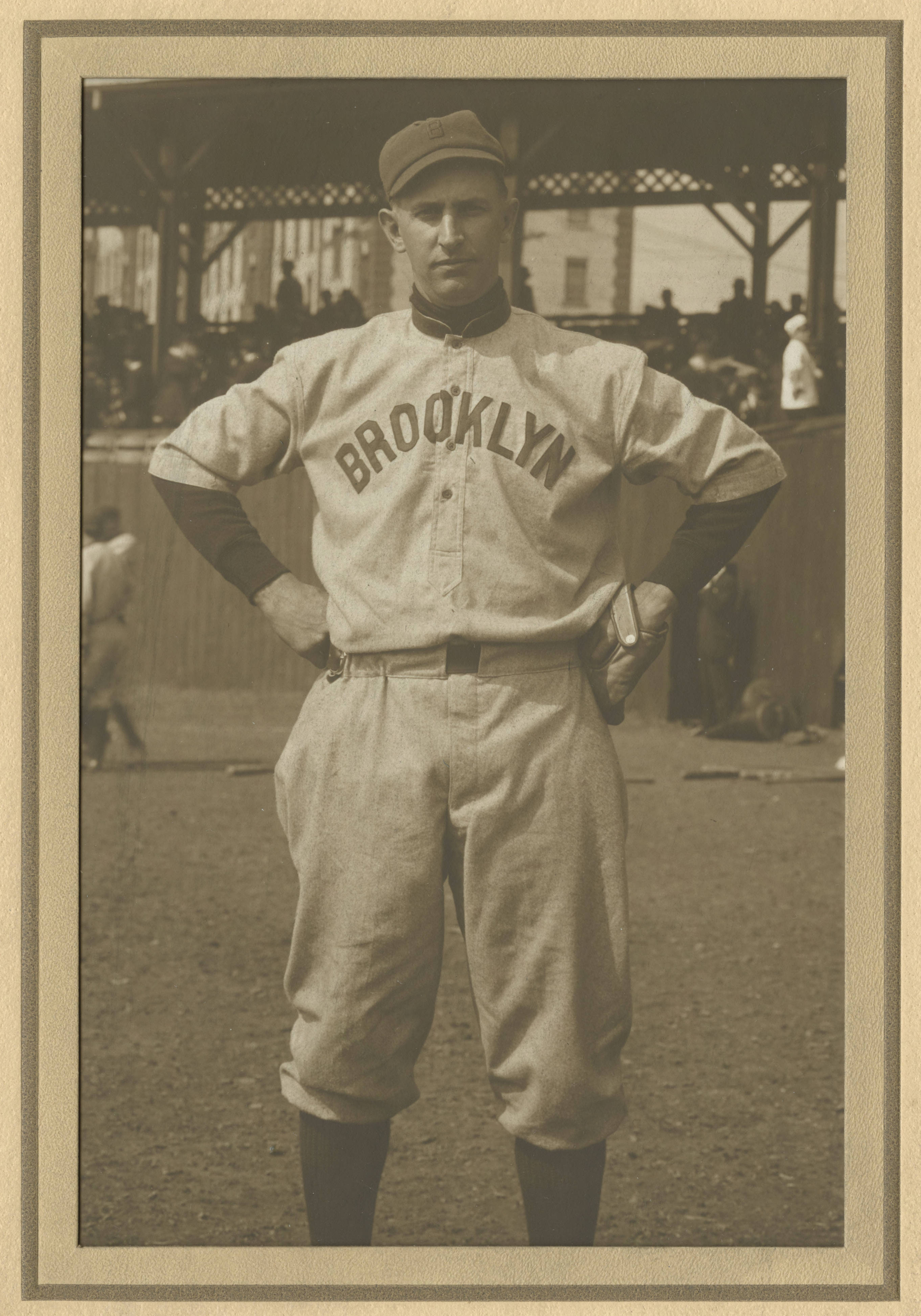
Bradley with the Brooklyn Tip-Tops, circa 1914.

Bradley made his professional debut on August 26, 1899 with the Chicago Orphans. After playing for two seasons in Chicago, Bradley moved to Cleveland to play for the newly formed American League. He spent the next decade with the Cleveland franchise, his best season coming in 1902 when he had a batting average of .340, 12 triples, and 11 home runs. After the 1910 season, Bradley spent three seasons with the Toronto Maple Leafs of the International League before returning to the Federal League in 1914, playing for the Brooklyn Tip-Tops that year and the Kansas City Packers the following year.

He led American League third basemen in fielding four times, setting a league record of seven putouts in one game in both 1901 and 1909. Bradley was the first Cleveland baseball player to hit for the cycle on September 24, 1903. In 1902 he hit home runs in four straight games and finished the year with a .340 batting average.

After finishing his playing and managing career in the Federal League, Bill Bradley was a scout for the Cleveland Indians. He was elected to the Indians' Hall of Fame shortly after his death in 1954. Bradley died in Cleveland at the age of 76 due to pneumonia. He was laid to rest at Calvary Cemetery in Cleveland, Ohio.

== Managerial record ==
Team	Year	Regular season					Postseason			
Team	Year	Games	Won	Lost	Win %	Finish	Won	Lost	Win %	Result
CLE	1905	41	20	21	.488	(interim)	–	–	–	
TEAM total		41	20	21	.488		0	0	–	
BTT	1914	154	77	77	.500	5th in FL	–	–	–	
BTT total		154	77	77	.500		0	0	–	
Total		195	97	98	.497		0	0	–	

== See also ==
- List of Major League Baseball career stolen bases leaders
- List of Major League Baseball player-managers
- List of Major League Baseball players to hit for the cycle

Achievements
Preceded by Patsy Dougherty	Hitting for the cycle September 24, 1903	Succeeded by Duff Cooley
