= Pep Goodwin =

American baseball player (1891-1972)

- Shortstop
- Born: December 19, 1891; Pocatello, Idaho, US
- Died: February 15, 1972 (aged 80); Oakland, California, US
- Batted: Left Threw: Right

MLB debut
- April 16, 1914, for the Kansas City Packers

Last MLB appearance
- October 3, 1915, for the Kansas City Packers

MLB statistics
- Batting average: .235
- Home runs: 1
- Runs batted in: 48
- Stats at Baseball Reference

Teams
- Kansas City Packers (1914–15)

Claire Vernon "Pep" Goodwin (December 19, 1891 – February 15, 1972) was an American Federal League baseball player for the Kansas City Packers in 1914–15. He batted left and threw right-handed. He weighed 160 lbs. He went to the University of California. His first game was on April 16, 1914, and his last game was on October 3, 1915. He was born in Pocatello, Idaho, on December 19, 1891, and died on February 15, 1972, in Oakland, California.
