= Bill Kenworthy =

American baseball player (1886–1950)

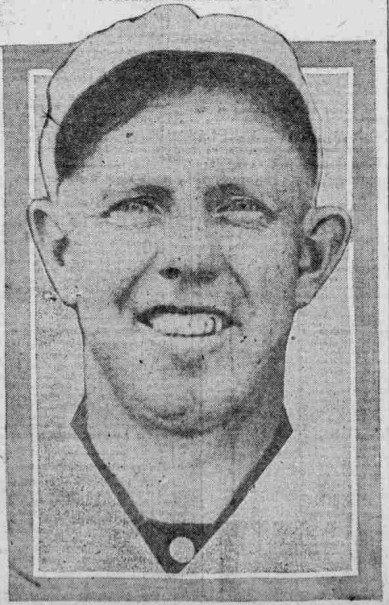
- Second baseman
- Born: July 4, 1886; Cambridge, Ohio, US
- Died: September 21, 1950 (aged 64); Eureka, California, US
- Batted: Right Threw: Right

MLB debut
- August 28, 1912, for the Washington Senators

Last MLB appearance
- May 8, 1917, for the St. Louis Browns

MLB statistics
- Batting average: .304
- Home runs: 18
- Runs batted in: 146
- Stats at Baseball Reference

Teams
- Washington Senators (1912); Kansas City Packers (1914–1915); St. Louis Browns (1917)

William Jennings "Duke" Kenworthy (July 4, 1886 – September 21, 1950) was an American Major League Baseball second baseman. He played all or part of four seasons in the majors, two of which—1914 and 1915—were spent as the starting second baseman for the Kansas City Packers of the short-lived Federal League. Bracketed around that were short stints for the Washington Senators in 1912 (where he played in the outfield) and for the St. Louis Browns in 1917.

Kenworthy was born to Ohio farmers and attended Muskingum College, where he received a teaching degree. He played minor league baseball as a pitcher and utility infielder from 1907 to 1911. After a short stint with the Washington Senators in the 1912 season, Kenworthy spent the 1913 season in the Pacific Coast League. In January 1914, Kenworthy signed a three-year contract with the Federal League's Kansas City Packers, which saw become the team's starting second baseman and the leading hitter. His 15 home runs in 1914 finished second in the league.

In 285 games over four seasons, Kenworthy posted a .304 batting average (301-for-989) with 159 runs, 71 doubles, 21 triples, 18 home runs, 146 RBI, 61 stolen bases, 67 bases on balls, .360 on-base percentage and .473 slugging percentage. He finished his career with a .946 fielding percentage playing primarily at second base and several games at left and right field.

In 1917, he gained a World War I draft exemption for a growth over one of his eyes; he aided the war effort by working at a shipyard in Oakland, California. He continued playing and managing in the minor leagues until 1924.

Kenworthy drowned while fishing off the California coast on September 21, 1950.

== Sources ==
- Career statistics from MLB · Baseball Reference · Baseball Reference (Minors) · Retrosheet · Baseball Almanac
