= Drummond Brown =

American baseball player (1885-1927)

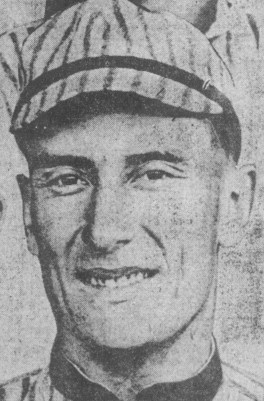
- Catcher
- Born: January 31, 1885; Los Angeles
- Died: January 27, 1927 (aged 41); Parkville, Missouri
- Batted: Right Threw: Right

MLB debut
- April 25, 1913, for the Boston Braves

Last MLB appearance
- October 3, 1915, for the Kansas City Packers

MLB statistics
- Batting average: .241
- Hits: 77
- Doubles: 14
- Stats at Baseball Reference

Teams
- Boston Braves (1913); Kansas City Packers (1914–1915)

Drummond Nicol Brown (January 31, 1885 – January 27, 1927) was a Major League Baseball catcher.

Brown started his professional career in 1906, at the age of 21, in the Kansas State League. He spent 1909–12 in the Pacific Coast League.

After nine games with the Boston Braves in 1913, Brown jumped to the Kansas City Packers of the Federal League. He played there from 1914 to 1915.

After the Federal League folded, Brown became a police officer in Kansas City, Missouri. He committed suicide by shooting himself in 1927.
