= Jack Enzenroth =

American baseball player (1885-1944)

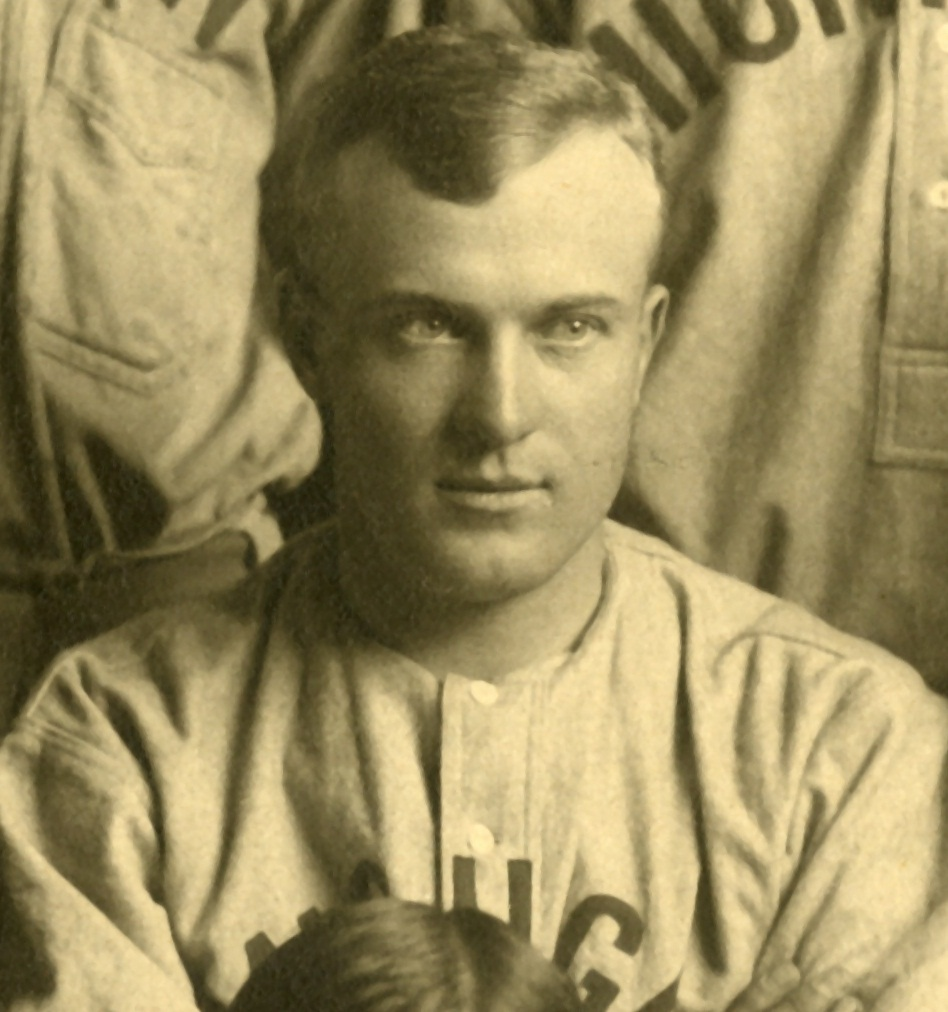
- Enzenroth at Michigan, 1910
- Catcher
- Born: November 4, 1885; Mineral Point, Wisconsin, US
- Died: February 21, 1944 (aged 58); Detroit, Michigan, US
- Batted: Right Threw: Right

MLB debut
- May 1, 1914, for the St. Louis Browns

Last MLB appearance
- September 22, 1915, for the Kansas City Packers

MLB statistics
- Batting average: .174
- Home runs: 0
- Runs batted in: 8
- Stats at Baseball Reference

Teams
- St. Louis Browns (1914); Kansas City Packers (1914–15)

Clarence Herman "Jack" Enzenroth (November 4, 1885 – February 21, 1944) was a Major League Baseball catcher. He played parts of two seasons in Major League Baseball, in 1914 for the St. Louis Browns and in 1915 for the Kansas City Packers of the Federal League.

== Early years ==
Enzenroth was born in Mineral Point, Wisconsin, in 1885. At the time of the 1900 United States census, Enzenroth was living in Mineral Point with his parents Herman Enzenroth and Eliza Enzenroth and an older brother, Albert Enzenroth. His father's occupation was recorded as a carpenter in the 1900 Census.

Enzenroth attended Mineral Point High School and played for the Mineral Point baseball team that lost only one game (to a college team) in four years.

== University of Michigan ==
Enzenroth attended at the University of Michigan and graduated in 1910 as part of the literary class. While at Michigan, he played as a catcher for the Michigan Wolverines baseball team from 1908 to 1910. He was the captain of the 1910 team that won 17 games and lost eight under first year head coach Branch Rickey. In April 1910, he hit one of the longest home runs ever made at Ferry Field. During Enzenroth's three years as the catcher for the Wolverines, the team compiled a record of 47–15–1.

== Professional baseball ==
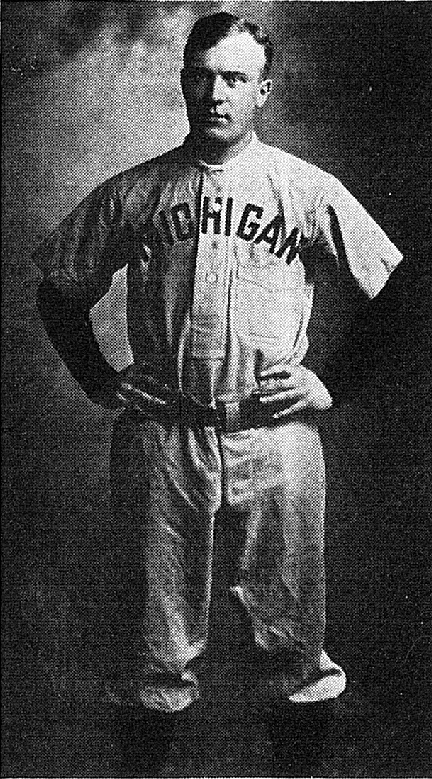
Enzenroth at Michigan, 1920

After graduating from Michigan, Enzenroth played baseball with a semi-professional team in Chicago.

In November 1913, Enzenroth signed with the St. Louis Browns of the American League. Enzenroth was re-united with Branch Rickey in St. Louis. Rickey had been Enzenroth's classmate at the University of Michigan, served as the coach of Michigan's baseball team in 1910, and was the player-manager for the Browns from 1913 to 1915. Rickey persuaded Enzenroth to leave his legal career to join the Browns in 1913. In March 1914, a newspaper profile of the Browns noted: "Enzenroth is a lawyer and an educated ballplayer. He hit well in the practice games and accompanied the first squad to Ft. Myers for the two game series with the Colonels, a circumstance that gave rise to the impression that he is regarded in a favorable light by those in command."

Enzenroth made his Major League debut with the Browns on May 1, 1914, and appeared in only three games for the team. After Enzenroth appeared in a game against the Chicago White Sox, a newspaper account noted: "Jack Enzenroth, Rickey's old college chum and fellow lawyer then donned the windpad and big mitt but somehow failed to deliver. He lost a shutout for Hamilton against Chicago by muffing a perfect peg to the plate."

In early June 1914, Enzenroth left the Browns organization after signing with the Kansas City Packers of the newly formed Federal League. Charles A. Baird, who had been the athletic director at the University of Michigan while Enzenroth was a student-athlete, was one of the co-owners of the Packers. Ezenroth appeared in 26 games for the Packers in 1914, compiling a .178 batting average. He returned to the Packers in 1915 and appeared in 14 games with a .158 batting average. Enzenroth appeared in his final Major League game on September 22, 1915.

== Later years ==
In 1917, Enzenroth was living in Toledo, Ohio, and listed in the city director as a manager.

In 1920, Enzenroth returned to the University of Michigan as the freshman baseball coach. From at least 1921 to 1929, he was listed in the Ann Arbor City Directories as a chemical engineer or chemist living in Ann Arbor with his wife Adelaide M. Enzenroth.

In 1944, Enzenroth died in Detroit, Michigan.
