= Gene Packard =

American baseball player (1887–1959)

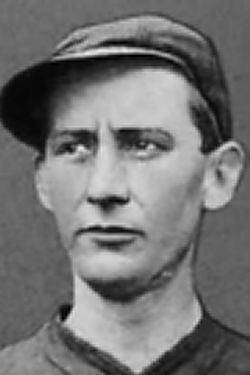
- Packard in 1915
- Pitcher
- Born: July 13, 1887; Colorado Springs, Colorado, U.S.
- Died: May 19, 1959 (aged 71); Riverside, California, U.S.
- Batted: Left Threw: Left

MLB debut
- September 27, 1912, for the Cincinnati Reds

Last MLB appearance
- August 14, 1919, for the Philadelphia Phillies

MLB statistics
- Win–loss record: 85–69
- Earned run average: 3.01
- Strikeouts: 488
- Stats at Baseball Reference

Teams
- Cincinnati Reds (1912–1913); Kansas City Packers (1914–1915); Chicago Cubs (1916–1917); St. Louis Cardinals (1917–1918); Philadelphia Phillies (1919)

Eugene Milo Packard (July 13, 1887 – May 19, 1959) was an American professional baseball pitcher who played in the Major Leagues from 1912 through 1919 for the Cincinnati Reds, Chicago Cubs, Kansas City Packers, St. Louis Cardinals and Philadelphia Phillies.

On August 3, 1918, while with the Cardinals, he gave up 12 runs in a game and did not take the loss. That feat was not matched for 90 years, until Scott Feldman of the Texas Rangers did the same on August 13, 2008.

One of the minor league teams Packard played for was the Independence Jewelers, based in Independence, Kansas, in 1908. Packard pitched a one-hit shutout against Tulsa, Oklahoma on July 26. On August 10, the local newspaper headline read "Packard Breaks World's Record". The game the newspaper was referring to was against Bartlesville, Oklahoma on August 8, and Packard had pitched a perfect game.

To this day, he is the only player in major league history to bear the surname Packard.
