= Gordon and Koppel Field =

Former sportsground in Missouri, U.S.

Gordon & Koppel Field
- also known as Federal League Park
- Interactive map of Gordon & Koppel Field
- Address: 47th Street and Tracy Avenue
- Location: Kansas City, Missouri
- Coordinates: 39.04071°N 94.56942°W
- Operator: Arthur F. Gordon and Hugo M. Koppel
- Capacity: 12,000
- Surface: Natural Grass
- Field size: Left Field – 1914: 270 ft (82 m); 1915: 280 ft (85 m); Left-Center – 380 ft (120 m); Center Field – 378 ft (115 m); Right-Center – 403 ft (123 m); Right Field – 350 ft (107 m)

Construction
- Opened: June 18, 1910; 115 years ago
- Closed: June 4, 1917; 108 years ago
- Demolished: Fall 1917

Tenants
- Kansas City Packers (Federal League) (1914–1915)

Gordon and Koppel Field is a former baseball ground located in Kansas City, Missouri. The ground was home to the Kansas City Packers of the Federal League, a third major league in 1914 and 1915. It was also called Gordon and Koppel Stadium, and variously stylized as Gordon & Koppel or Gordon-Koppel.

The local Gordon & Koppel Clothing Company, which included sporting goods among its wares, was operated by Arthur F. Gordon and Hugo M. Koppel, who created the Gordon & Koppel Athletic Company. They opened the multi-purpose Gordon & Koppel Stadium in 1910. Events reported in the local newspapers included baseball, football and track-and-field. The city directory gave Gordon & Koppel Stadium's address as "47th [Street] southeast corner Tracy Avenue."

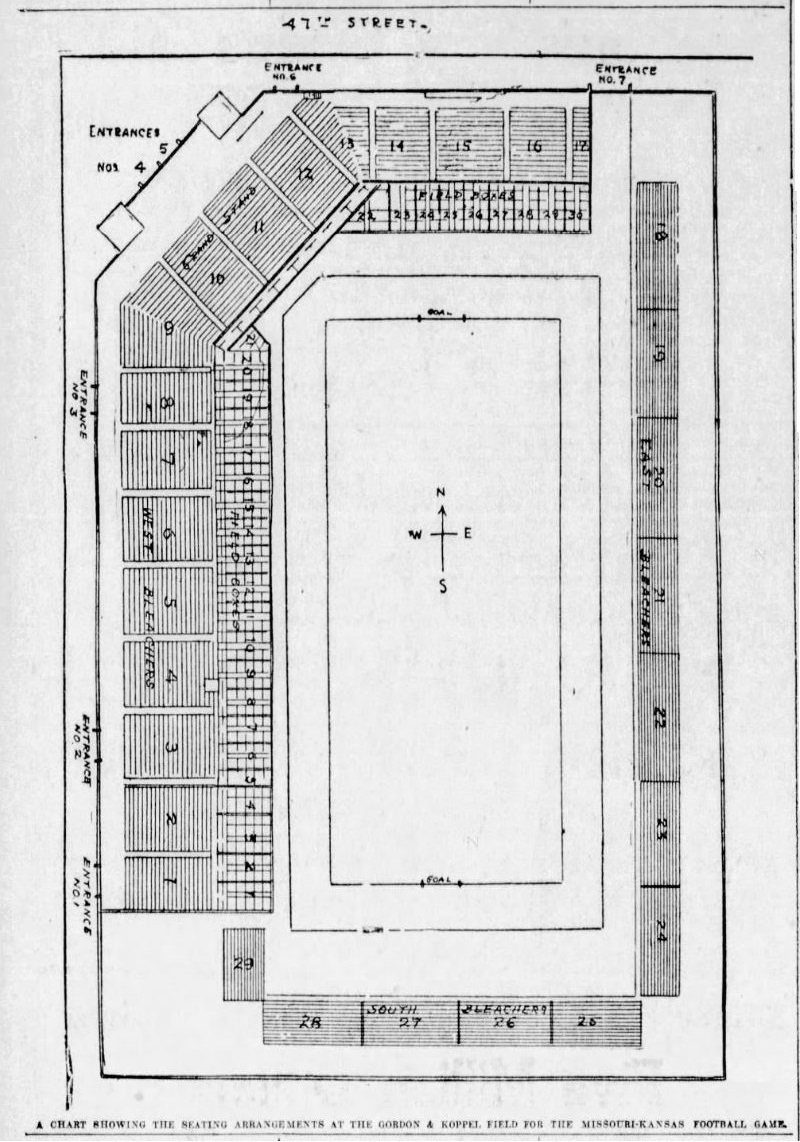
1910 football game seating

Prior to the Federal League's arrival, the most important event held at the stadium was probably the November 24, 1910, Kansas vs. Missouri annual rivalry college football game. The game ended in a 5-5 tie, each team scoring a touchdown (worth 5 points at the time) and missing the subsequent extra point attempts. The Kansas players in particular were not happy with the field conditions, saying the surface was too hard and could cause injuries.[Leavenworth Weekly Times, November 24, 1910, p.1] The change in venue gave the annual event a boost, with the highest gate receipts recorded to that point in the series ($34,000).[Atchison Daily Globe, November 25, p.7] This entry in the rivalry series was the last one to be played in Kansas City until 1944.

The Federal League began operating as a minor league in 1913, with the Kansas City Packers as a member and with home games being played on Gordon & Koppel Field, as the papers were calling it by then. Two members of the Gordon family were on the team's board of directors. The league declared itself a major league for 1914, and Kansas City continued as a league member for its two-year existence at major status. In 1914, the Packers finished in sixth place, 20 games back of first place. They fared better in 1915, finishing 5 1/2 games behind, but that was the end of it.

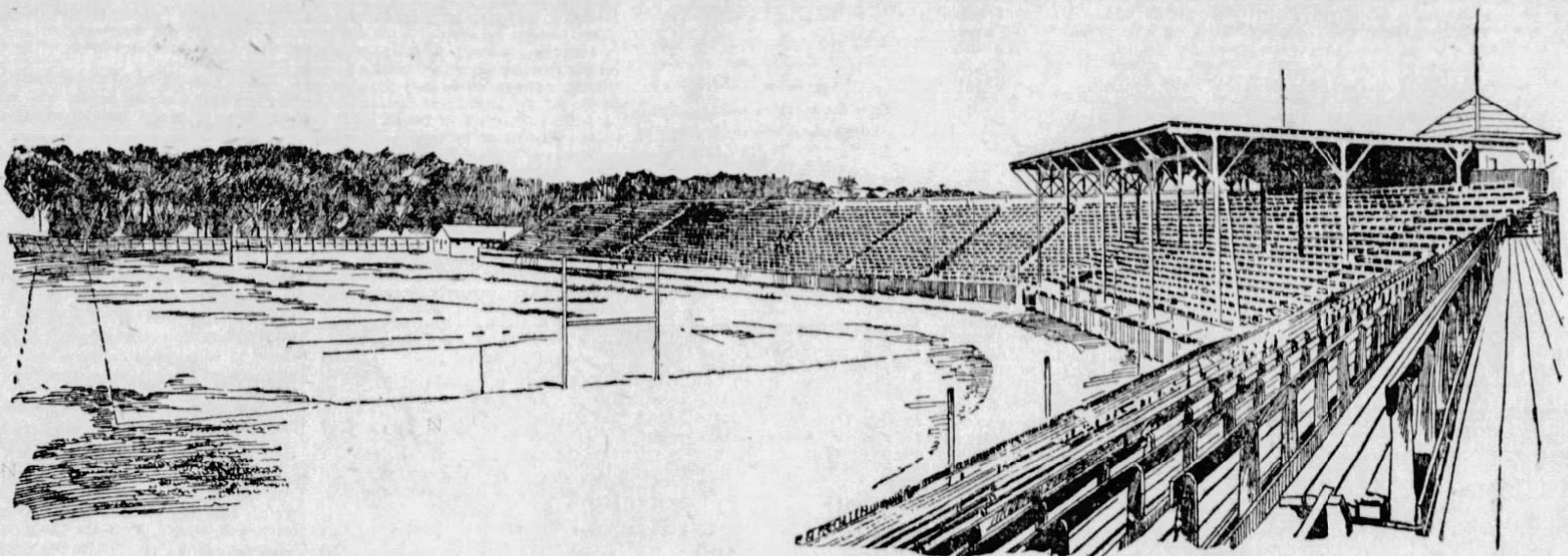
Gordon & Koppel Field freshly built in 1910 as a multipurpose stadium

The ballfield was located on a block bound by Lydia Avenue and The Paseo (east, left field); 47th Street (north, third base) (approximates Emanuel Cleaver II Boulevard); Tracy Avenue (west, first base); and Brush Creek (south, right field).

The field was subject to flooding from Brush Creek, which occasionally wrought havoc with the games. After the Federal experiment, the site was soon abandoned. In the summer of 1917, the ballpark site was sold for development.[Kansas City Times, June 5, 1917, p.4] The land once occupied by the ballpark is now a public park called Kiely Park, which also contains a few commercial businesses, primarily restaurants.
