= Dan Adams =

American baseball player (1887-1964)

- Pitcher
- Born: June 19, 1887; St. Louis, Missouri, U.S.
- Died: October 6, 1964 (aged 77); St. Louis, Missouri, U.S.
- Batted: Right Threw: Right

MLB debut
- May 22, 1914, for the Kansas City Packers

Last MLB appearance
- September 26, 1915, for the Kansas City Packers

MLB statistics
- Win–loss record: 4–11
- Earned run average: 3.74
- Strikeouts: 54
- Stats at Baseball Reference

Teams
- Kansas City Packers (1914–1915)

Daniel Leslie Adams (June 19, 1887 – October 6, 1964), nicknamed "Rube", was an American Major League Baseball pitcher who played for two seasons. He played for the Kansas City Packers of the Federal League during their two seasons of existence, 1914 and 1915. He played in 47 career games.
