= Ben Harris (1910s pitcher) =

American baseball player (1889-1927)

- Pitcher
- Born: December 7, 1889; Donelson, Tennessee
- Died: April 1, 1927 (aged 37); St. Louis, Missouri
- Batted: Right Threw: Right

MLB debut
- April 19, 1914, for the Kansas City Packers

Last MLB appearance
- May 3, 1915, for the Kansas City Packers

MLB statistics
- Win–loss record: 7–7
- Earned run average: 4.04
- Strikeouts: 40
- Stats at Baseball Reference

Teams
- Kansas City Packers (1914–1915)

Ben Franklin Harris (December 17, 1889 – April 1, 1927) was a Major League Baseball pitcher who played for the Kansas City Packers in 1914 and 1915. He died at age 37 in 1927 from tongue cancer.
