= Art Kruger =

American baseball player (1881–1949)

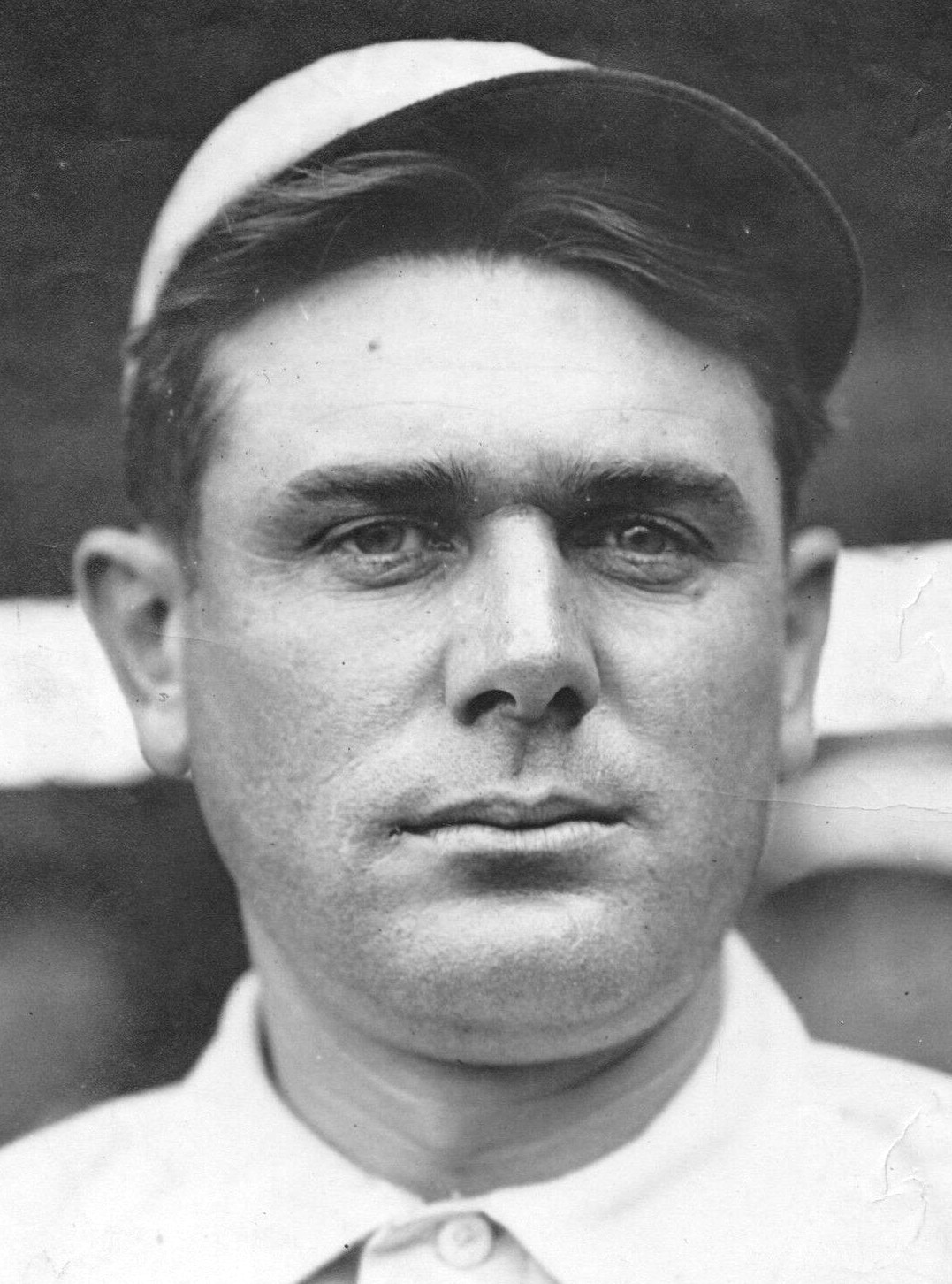
- Outfielder
- Born: March 16, 1881; San Antonio, Texas, U.S.
- Died: November 28, 1949 (aged 68); Hondo, California, U.S.
- Batted: Right Threw: Right

MLB debut
- April 11, 1907, for the Cincinnati Reds

Last MLB appearance
- September 26, 1915, for the Kansas City Packers

MLB statistics
- Batting average: .232
- Home runs: 6
- Runs batted in: 115
- Stats at Baseball Reference

Teams
- Cincinnati Reds (1907); Cleveland Naps (1910); Boston Doves (1910); Cleveland Naps (1910); Kansas City Packers (1914–1915)

Arthur Theodore Kruger (March 16, 1881 – November 28, 1949) was an American professional baseball player who played as an outfielder in the Major Leagues from 1907 to 1915. He would play for the Cincinnati Reds, Cleveland Naps, Boston Braves, and Kansas City Packers.
