= Grover Gilmore (baseball) =

American baseball player (1888–1919)

- Right fielder
- Born: November 1, 1888; Chicago, Illinois, U.S.
- Died: November 25, 1919 (aged 31); Sioux City, Iowa, U.S.
- Batted: Left Threw: Left

MLB debut
- April 18, 1914, for the Kansas City Packers

Last MLB appearance
- September 26, 1915, for the Kansas City Packers

MLB statistics
- Batting average: .286
- On-base percentage: .341
- Games played: 258
- Stats at Baseball Reference

Teams
- Kansas City Packers (FL) (1914–1915)

Ernest Grover Gilmore (November 1, 1888 – November 25, 1919) was an American professional baseball player who played right field from 1914 through 1915 in the Federal League. Listed at 5 ft 9 1/2 in (1.77 m) and 170 lb (77 kg), he batted and threw left-handed.

Born in Chicago, Illinois, Gilmore started his Minor leagues career in 1910 with the Denver Grizzlies, playing for them one year before joining the San Francisco Seals (1912), Buffalo Bisons (1912) and Fort Wayne Railroaders (1914). Then, in 1914 he joined the Kansas City Packers of the outlaw Federal League.

Gilmore became a regular outfielder for the Packers during the last two seasons of the league. He was solid in his season debut, batting a .287 average with 23 stolen bases, driving in 32 runs while scoring 91 more. His only negative was that he became the first rookie batter to log 100 strikeouts in a single season, whiffing 108 times. No rookie until Philadelphia Phillies first baseman Dick Allen in 1964 would up 100 strikeouts with a higher batting average, when he hit .318 and was striking out 138 times.

The next year Gilmore cut down his strikeouts to 44 and hit .285 in 119 games, while collecting 22 doubles, 15 triples and a career-high 47 RBI.

In a two-season career, Gilmore posted a .286 average (269-for-941) with two home runs and 79 RBI in 258 games, including 47 doubles, 20 triples, 42 stolen bases and a .341 on-base percentage. He also hit .216 and four homers in 64 minor league games.

In 1912, while playing in the minors, Gilmore was on his way to Buffalo after being released by the San Francisco Coast League team. His departure was saddened by the loss of his watch from a fob that he had received from President William Howard Taft. The theft was given publicity, and two days later a package was received which contained both watch and fob. They were sent to Gilmore.

Gilmore was a long-time resident of Sioux City, Iowa, where he died at the age of 31.
