= Pete Henning =

American baseball player (1887–1939)

- Pitcher
- Born: December 28, 1887; Crown Point, Indiana, U.S.
- Died: November 4, 1939 (aged 51); Dyer, Indiana, U.S.
- Batted: Right Threw: Right

MLB debut
- April 17, 1914, for the Kansas City Packers

Last MLB appearance
- October 3, 1915, for the Kansas City Packers

MLB statistics
- Win–loss record: 14–25
- Earned run average: 3.83
- Strikeouts: 118
- Stats at Baseball Reference

Teams
- Kansas City Packers (1914–1915)

Ernest Herman "Pete" Henning (December 28, 1887 – November 4, 1939) was an American Major League Baseball pitcher who played for the Kansas City Packers in 1914 and 1915.
