= Dwight Stone (baseball) =

American baseball player (1886-1976)

- Pitcher
- Born: August 2, 1886; Holt County, Nebraska, U.S.
- Died: June 3, 1976 (aged 89); Glendale, California, U.S.
- Batted: Right Threw: Right

MLB debut
- April 13, 1913, for the St. Louis Browns

Last MLB appearance
- September 29, 1914, for the Kansas City Packers

MLB statistics
- Win–loss record: 10–20
- Earned run average: 4.08
- Strikeouts: 125
- Stats at Baseball Reference

Teams
- St. Louis Browns (1913); Kansas City Packers (1914)

Dwight Ely Stone (August 2, 1886 – June 3, 1976) was an American Major League Baseball pitcher. Stone played for the St. Louis Browns in 1913 and the Kansas City Packers in 1914.
