= Chet Chadbourne =

American baseball player (1884–1943)

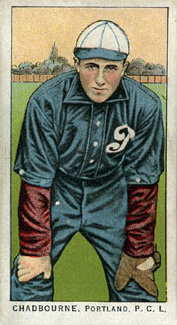
- Chadbourne's 1911 Obak baseball card
- Outfielder
- Born: October 28, 1884; Parkman, Maine, U.S.
- Died: June 21, 1943 (aged 58); Los Angeles, California, U.S.
- Batted: Left Threw: Right

MLB debut
- September 17, 1906, for the Boston Americans

Last MLB appearance
- September 2, 1918, for the Boston Braves

MLB statistics
- Assists: 109
- Fielding percentage: .964
- Putouts: 645
- Stats at Baseball Reference

Teams
- Boston Americans (1906–1907); Kansas City Packers (1914–1915); Boston Braves (1918)

Chester James (Pop) Chadbourne (October 28, 1884 – June 21, 1943) was an American outfielder in Major League Baseball, playing mainly as a center fielder for three teams between 1906 and 1918. Chadbourne spent portions of five seasons in the major leagues, but his only two complete major league seasons were with the Kansas City Packers of the Federal League. He had more success in the minor leagues, collecting more than 3000 hits over 20 years.

Listed at 5 ft 9 in (1.75 m), 170 lb (77 kg), Chadbourne batted left-handed and threw right-handed. After his playing career, Chadbourne managed and umpired in the minor leagues.

== Early life and career ==
Chadbourne was born in Parkman, Maine. A fine defensive outfielder, he entered the major leagues in 1906 with the Boston Red Sox, playing for them two years before being sold to the Indianapolis Indians of the American Association in November 1908.

After five minor league seasons, he played from 1914 to 1915 for the Kansas City Packers of the Federal League, where he led the league's outfielders in assists (34) in 1914 and in outs (475) and fielding percentage (.979) in 1915. In 1914, Chadbourne became the first major league player to bat at Wrigley Field (then called Weeghman Park), hitting leadoff for the Packers against the Chicago Chi-Feds on April 23.

Chadbourne returned to the minors for the 1916 and 1917 seasons, making his last major league appearance with the Boston Braves in 1918. In a five-season career, Chadbourne was a .255 hitter (345-for-1353) with two home runs and 82 RBI in 347 games, including 183 runs, 41 doubles, 18 triples, and 78 stolen bases.

== Later life ==
Following his major league career, Chadbourne returned to the minors to play in the Pacific Coast League; he finished with 3,216 hits over 21 total minor league seasons. He also managed the Salt Lake City Bees of the 1926 Utah–Idaho League. By January 1927, the press reported that Chadbourne was seeking an umpiring position. He was hired as a PCL umpire after the 1928 season.

Chadbourne was umpiring in the PCL in 1930 when he had a confrontation with star outfielder Buzz Arlett after a game and struck Arlett in the face with his umpire mask. Arlett required twelve stitches to his face and the injury may have cost him an opportunity to sign with the Brooklyn Dodgers. After Commissioner Kenesaw Mountain Landis investigated the incident, Chadbourne was fired.

He umpired in the Western League in 1932.

Chadbourne died in Los Angeles at age 58 by self-inflicted gunshot wound. He was survived by his wife, Gladys.
