= Chief Johnson =

American baseball player (1886–1922)

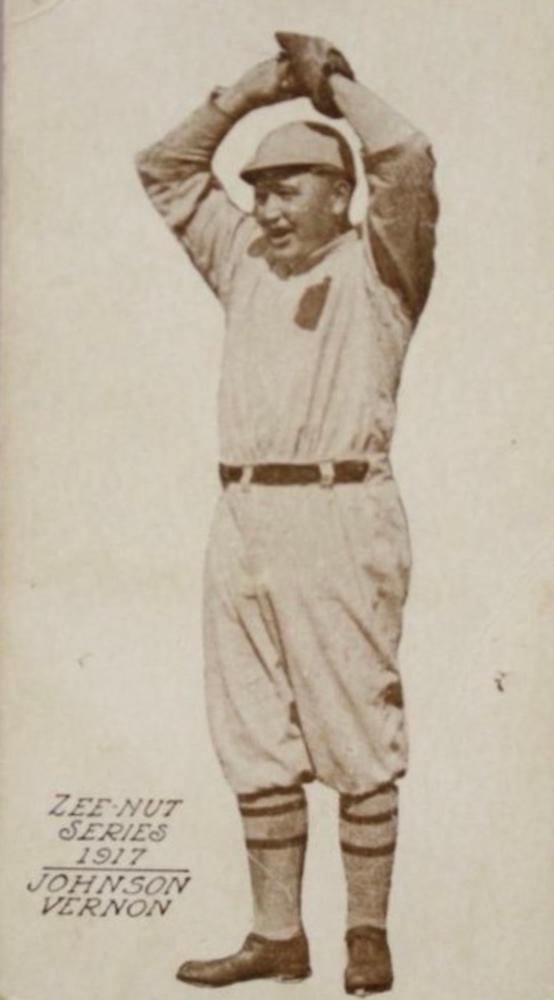
- Johnson on a 1917 baseball card
- Pitcher
- Born: March 30, 1886; Winnebago, Nebraska, U.S.
- Died: June 11, 1922 (aged 36); Des Moines, Iowa, U.S.
- Batted: Right Threw: Right

MLB debut
- April 16, 1913, for the Cincinnati Reds

Last MLB appearance
- September 30, 1915, for the Kansas City Packers

MLB statistics
- Win–loss record: 40–43
- Earned run average: 2.95
- Strikeouts: 304
- Stats at Baseball Reference

Teams
- Cincinnati Reds (1913–1914); Kansas City Packers (1914–1915)

George Howard "Chief" Johnson (March 20, 1886 – June 11, 1922) was an American professional baseball pitcher. He played three seasons in Major League Baseball (MLB), from 1913 to 1915, for the Cincinnati Reds of the National League and Kansas City Packers of the Federal League. He surrendered the first home run in the history of Wrigley Field, to Art Wilson on April 23, 1914.

Johnson was of Ho-Chunk, French and Irish ancestry. He identified as Ho-Chunk and was depicted in the media as a Native American. A 1913 feature by Ripley's Believe It or Not! reported his full name as George Washington Murphy Johnson.

Johnson was shot to death in Des Moines, Iowa, on June 11, 1922, at the age of 36. He had been in town to host a medicine show and had gotten into an argument during a dice game. The shooter, despite having confessed to police and being identified by witnesses, was eventually acquitted of first degree murder.
