= Johnny Rawlings =

American baseball player (1892–1972)

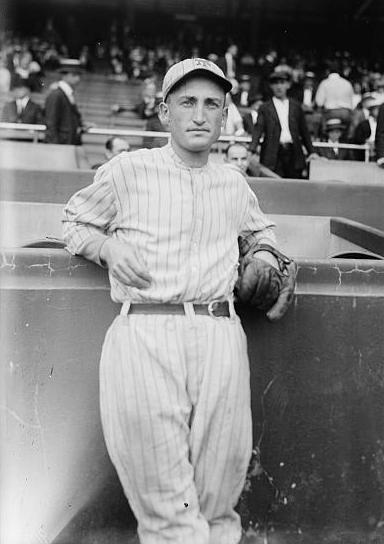
- Infielder
- Born: August 17, 1892; Bloomfield, Iowa, U.S.
- Died: October 16, 1972 (aged 80); Inglewood, California, U.S.
- Batted: Right Threw: Right

MLB debut
- April 14, 1914, for the Cincinnati Reds

Last MLB appearance
- September 13, 1926, for the Pittsburgh Pirates

MLB statistics
- Batting average: .250
- Home runs: 14
- Runs batted in: 303
- Stats at Baseball Reference

Teams
- Cincinnati Reds (1914); Kansas City Packers (1914–1915); Boston Braves (1917–1920); Philadelphia Phillies (1920–1921); New York Giants (1921–1922); Pittsburgh Pirates (1923–1926)

Career highlights and awards
- World Series champion (1921)

John William Rawlings [Red] (August 17, 1892 – October 16, 1972) was an American second baseman and shortstop in Major League Baseball who played for six different teams between the 1914 and 1926 seasons. Listed at 5 ft 8 in (1.73 m), 158 lb., he batted and threw right-handed.

== Career ==
A native of Bloomfield, Iowa, Rawlings attended high school in Los Angeles. He started his professional career in 1911 with the Vernon Tigers of the Pacific Coast League.

Rawlings entered the majors in 1914 with the Cincinnati Reds, appearing for them in 33 games before jumping during the mid-season to the Kansas City Packers of the outlaw Federal League. After one and a half seasons in Kansas City, he spent 1917 with the Toledo Iron Men of the American Association.

Rawlings returned to major league action with the Boston Braves (1917-20), and later played for the Philadelphia Phillies (1920-'21), New York Giants (1921-'22) and Pittsburgh Pirates (1923-26). His most productive season came in 1921 for Phillies and Giants, when he posted career highs in hits (156), runs (60), extrabases (27), RBI (46) and games played (146), while hitting .278 average. In 1922, Rawlings hit .282 in 82 games, good enough to play for John McGraw's National League pennant winning Giants in 1921 and 1922. He hit .333 (10-for-30) with three doubles and four RBI for the 1921 Giants World Series champions. Of particular note was the last play in the series, the last time a best-of-nine game format was used. With the Giants winning in the ninth inning and the Yankees facing elimination, Yankees manager Miller Huggins sent Babe Ruth in to pinch hit to lead off the inning. Ruth had knee and elbow injuries and had missed Games 6 and 7 completely, and had sat out Game 8 thus far. He grounded out to the first baseman unassisted. Aaron Ward coaxed a walk, and represented the tying run. The next batter was Home Run Baker. After fouling off several pitches, he hit a ball that appeared to have eyes for right field. Ward took off on contact. Rawlings reached the ball, and after tumbling, threw to first base from his knees to get the out. Ward inexplicably continued running, rounded second base, and with his head down, barreled toward third. An astute throw to Frank Frisch at third base nailed Ward for the third out, and the Series was won by the Giants. Six seasons later, the winning pitcher, Art Nehf, then with the Cincinnati Reds, would call Rawlings' snag the best play he had ever seen. In all, Rawlings earned three World Series rings, though he did not play for the 1922 Giants and 1925 Pirates series champions. During an early September game at Pittsburgh against the St. Louis Cardinals, Rawlings, now playing for the eventual World Champion Pirates, broke the fibula near the ankle in his left leg, while sliding into second base. The injury would keep him out of the World Series, and would cut short his major league playing career the following year.

Following his major league career, Rawlings played in the minors until 1930. He began the 1930 season with the Pacific Electric ball club in Los Angeles, but by June, fate found him playing infield on the same Texas League Dallas Steers ball club with former Major League great Grover Cleveland Alexander, a future Baseball Hall of Famer. After he was released by the Steers in June, Rawlings signed on in July as a utility infielder with the Los Angeles Angels.

From the 1940s Rawlings coached for a number of years and also managed during eight years in the All-American Girls Professional Baseball League for the Grand Rapids Chicks (1946-'50), Peoria Redwings (1951) and Rockford Peaches (1953-'54). He led his teams to six playoff appearances, including a Championship Title with the 1947 Chicks.

== Personal life ==
Johnny Rawlings was married to the former Alexia Selma Wieben (1894–1986) in Los Angeles, California on October 19, 1917. They had two daughters, Audrey (later Mrs. Jack Perry), who was born in 1921 in Pennsylvania, and Joanne (later Mrs. Jack Lynwood), who was born in 1927 in California. Shortly after his retirement from playing baseball, Johnny Rawlings was an insurance salesman in Los Angeles.

Rawlings died in Inglewood, California in 1972, at the age of 80. His wife Alexia died in 1986.

== Sources ==
- The ESPN Baseball Encyclopedia – Gary Gillette, Peter Gammons, Pete Palmer. Publisher: Sterling Publishing, 2005. Format: Paperback, 1824pp. ISBN 1-4027-4771-3
