= Ted Easterly =

American baseball player (1885–1951)

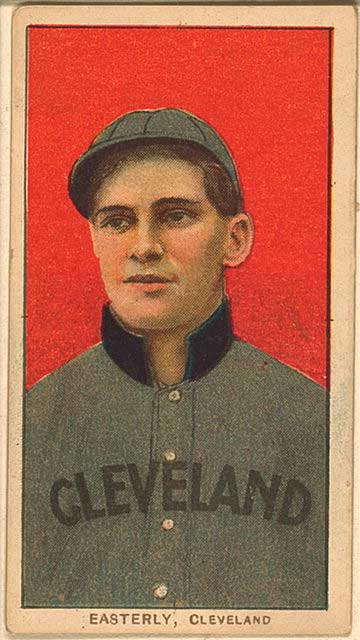
- Catcher
- Born: April 20, 1885; Swanton, Nebraska, U.S.
- Died: July 6, 1951 (aged 66); Clearlake Highlands, California, U.S.
- Batted: Left Threw: Right

MLB debut
- April 17, 1909, for the Cleveland Naps

Last MLB appearance
- October 3, 1915, for the Kansas City Packers

MLB statistics
- Batting average: .300
- Home runs: 8
- Runs batted in: 261
- Stats at Baseball Reference

Teams
- Cleveland Naps (1909–1912); Chicago White Sox (1912–1913); Kansas City Packers (1914–1915)

Theodore Harrison Easterly (April 20, 1885 – July 6, 1951) was an American catcher in Major League Baseball who played for the Cleveland Naps (1909–1912), Chicago White Sox (1912–1913) and Kansas City Packers (1914–1915). Easterly batted left-handed and threw right-handed. He was born in Swanton, Nebraska.

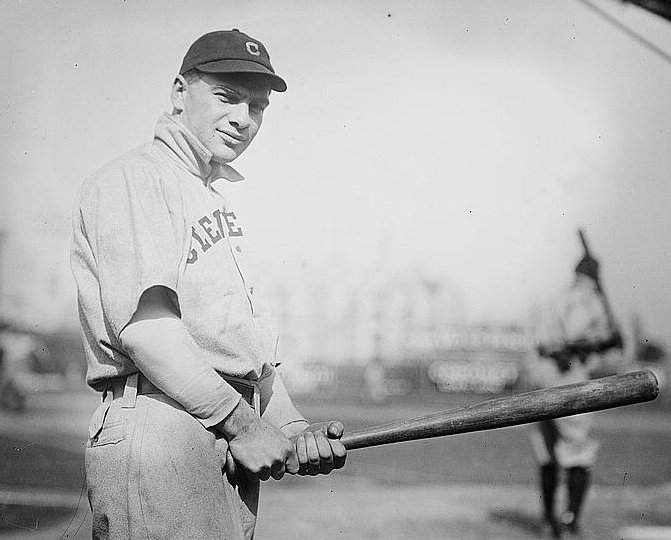
Easterly at Hilltop Park, 1911.

Easterly was a good contact hitter who batted over .300 four times. From 1910 to 1912, he collected three consecutive .300 seasons with a high .324 in 1911 and led the American League with 11 pinch-hits in 1912. He jumped to the Federal League in 1914 and ended the season third in the batting race with a .335 average. A good defensive player with a solid throwing arm, he also served as a backup right fielder. In a seven-season career, Easterly was a .300 hitter with eight home runs and 261 RBI in 706 games played.

Easterly died in Clearlake Highlands, California, at the age of 66.
