= Nick Cullop (pitcher) =

American baseball player (1887–1961)

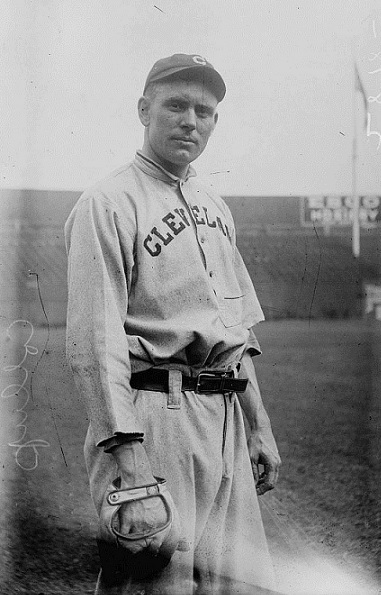
- Pitcher
- Born: September 17, 1887; Chilhowie, Virginia, U.S.
- Died: April 15, 1961 (aged 73); Tazewell, Virginia, U.S.
- Batted: Left Threw: Left

MLB debut
- May 20, 1913, for the Cleveland Naps

Last MLB appearance
- May 9, 1921, for the St. Louis Browns

MLB statistics
- Win–loss record: 57–54
- Earned run average: 2.73
- Strikeouts: 400
- Stats at Baseball Reference

Teams
- Cleveland Naps (1913–1914); Kansas City Packers (1914–1915); New York Yankees (1916–1917); St. Louis Browns (1921)

Norman Andrew "Nick" Cullop (September 17, 1887 – April 15, 1961) was an American starting pitcher who played in Major League Baseball between 1913 and 1921. A native of Chilhowie, Virginia, Cullop batted and threw left-handed. He is not related to outfielder Nick Cullop.

== Career ==
Cullop started his professional career with Salt Lake City (PCL) and reached the majors in 1913 with the Cleveland Naps, spending parts of two seasons with them before moving to the Kansas City Packers (1914–1915), New York Yankees (1916–1917) and St. Louis Browns (1921). His most productive season came in 1915 with Kansas City in the outlaw Federal League, when he recorded career-numbers in wins (22) and innings pitched (302 1/3). With the 1916 Yankees, Cullop went 13–6 with 77 strikeouts and led the team with a 2.05 ERA, which was also a career best. Cullop also had the dubious distinction of losing 20 games in 1914, and splitting his 20 losses between two leagues, losing one game for the American League Naps and 19 for the Federal League Packers.

In a six-season career, Cullop posted a 57–54 record with 400 strikeouts and a 2.73 ERA in 1024.0 innings, including nine shutouts and 62 complete games. Cullop died in Tazewell, Virginia at the age of 73.
