= Kansas City Packers =

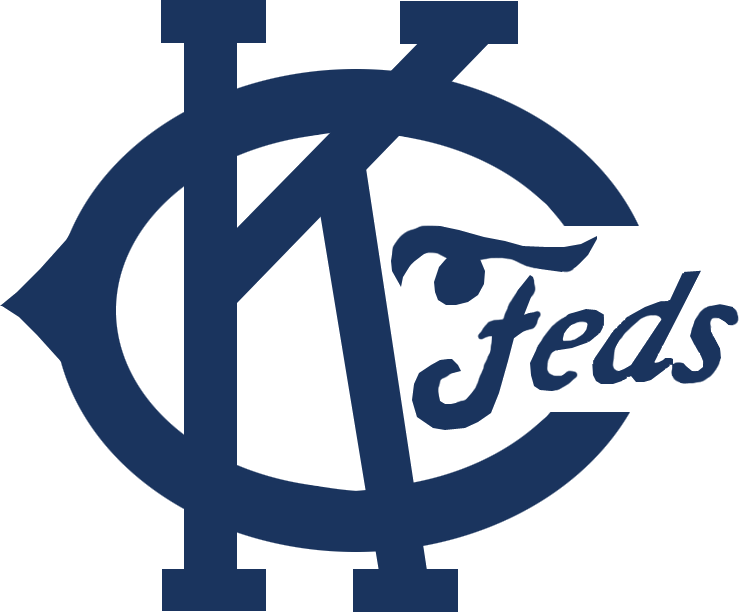
- Logo

Information
- Location: Kansas City, Missouri
- Founded: 1914
- Disbanded: 1915
- League championships: 0
- Former name: Kansas City Packers
- Former league: Federal League
- Former ballpark: Gordon and Koppel Field
- Ownership: S. S. Gordon, Conrad H. Mann and Charles A. Baird
- Manager: George Stovall

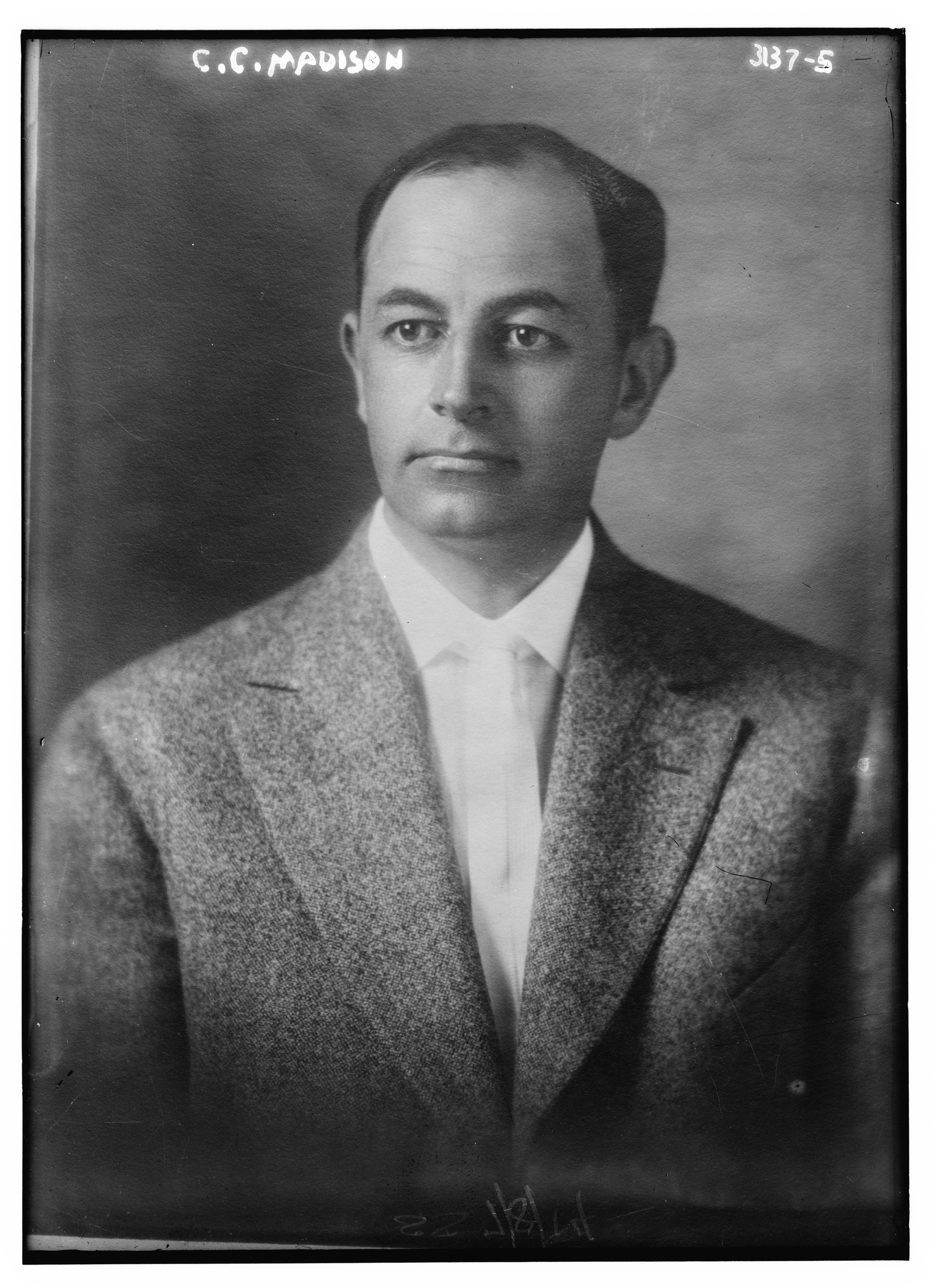
C.C. Madison in 1915. He was the former owner of the Kansas City, Missouri baseball club of the Federal League.

The Kansas City Packers were a Federal League baseball club in Kansas City, Missouri from 1914 to 1915. They finished sixth in 1914 with a 67–84 record, and fourth in 1915 with an 81–72 record.

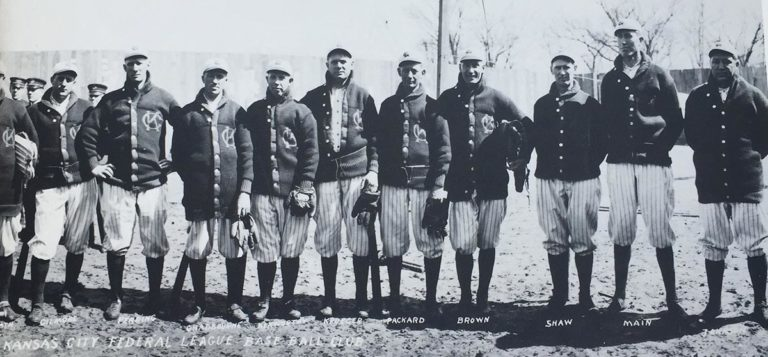
Members of the Kansas City Packers, 1914.

The Packers moved to Kansas City in July 1913 from Covington, Kentucky, when the Federal League was an independent minor league. The Packers' first home game came on July 12, with news reports saying 10,000 people were in attendance.

When the league declared itself major, the Packers’ first signing was of former St. Louis Browns manager, George Stovall, reportedly the first signing of a major league player in violation of his reserve clause.

The Packers began their major league life on April 23, 1914 as the visiting team in the first game played in what is now known as Wrigley Field. George "Chief" Johnson was the Packers’ starting pitcher in that historic game, but was removed after two innings when served with an injunction from his former team, the Cincinnati Reds.

The Packers’ home season ended early for them, when a flash flood that hit Kansas City after a heavy downpour knocked down the walls of the ballpark, Gordon and Koppel Field. The Packers finished on the road, and ended in sixth place, 20 games behind the pennant-winning Indianapolis Hoosiers.

During the 1914–1915 off-season, the Federal League tried to move the franchise to Newark, New Jersey, but were prevented by injunctions obtained by Kansas City management. The Packers went into spring training believing they would be playing in Newark, but last-minute negotiations led to the Indianapolis franchise being moved instead.

In the course of the closest pennant race in major league history, the Packers led until late August before fading and finishing 4th, five and one-half games behind the first place Chicago Whales, and one-half game ahead of the fifth place Newark Pepper.

Among the men who played for the Packers were George Stovall, Bill Bradley, Johnny Rawlings, Chief Johnson, Ted Easterly and Nick Cullop, who won 22 games in 1915.

To mark the centennial of Wrigley Field on April 23, 2014, the Chicago Cubs' opponents, the Arizona Diamondbacks, wore the Packers' uniforms.

On Sunday, May 31, 2015, the Kansas City Royals wore the Packers' uniforms against the Chicago Cubs who wore the Whales' uniforms. Wrigley Field also got into the act and rebranded itself as Weeghman Park. On the manual scoreboard, Kansas City's label also bore the "FL" designation for the Federal League.

== See also ==
- Covington Blue Sox
- 1914 Kansas City Packers season
- 1915 Kansas City Packers season
- Kansas City Packers all-time roster

== References and external links ==
- Team index page at Baseball Reference
- Pietrusza, David (1991). The Formation, Sometimes Absorption and Mostly Inevitable Demise of 18 Professional Baseball Organizations, 1871 to Present. Jefferson (NC): McFarland & Company. ISBN 0-89950-590-2.
