= 1914 Chicago White Sox season =

1914 Chicago White Sox
- League: American League
- Ballpark: Comiskey Park
- City: Chicago, Illinois
- Record: 70–84 (.455)
- League place: T–6th
- Owners: Charles Comiskey
- Managers: Nixey Callahan

== Regular season ==
=== Season standings ===
American League
Team	W	L	Pct.	GB	Home	Road
Philadelphia Athletics	99	53	.651	—	51‍–‍24	48‍–‍29
Boston Red Sox	91	62	.595	8½	44‍–‍31	47‍–‍31
Washington Senators	81	73	.526	19	40‍–‍33	41‍–‍40
Detroit Tigers	80	73	.523	19½	42‍–‍35	38‍–‍38
St. Louis Browns	71	82	.464	28½	42‍–‍36	29‍–‍46
Chicago White Sox	70	84	.455	30	43‍–‍37	27‍–‍47
New York Yankees	70	84	.455	30	36‍–‍40	34‍–‍44
Cleveland Naps	51	102	.333	48½	32‍–‍47	19‍–‍55

=== Record vs. opponents ===
1914 American League record Sources:
Team	BOS	CWS	CLE	DET	NYH	PHA	SLB	WSH
Boston	—	13–9	16–6	15–7–1	11–11	12–9–3	13–9–2	11–11
Chicago	9–13	—	13–9	6–16	12–10–1	5–17	13–9–1	12–10–1
Cleveland	6–16	9–13	—	6–16	8–14–1	3–19	8–13–2	11–11–1
Detroit	7–15–1	16–6	16–6	—	13–9–1	9–12–1	9–13	10–12–1
New York	11–11	10–12–1	14–8–1	9–13–1	—	8–14	11–11	7–15
Philadelphia	9–12–3	17–5	19–3	12–9–1	14–8	—	15–7–1	13–9–1
St. Louis	9–13–2	9–13–1	13–8–2	13–9	11–11	7–15–1	—	9–13
Washington	11–11	10–12–1	11–11–1	12–10–1	15–7	9–13–1	13–9	—

=== Roster ===
1914 Chicago White Sox
Roster
Pitchers: Joe Benz; Eddie Cicotte; Red Faber; Hi Jasper; Bill Lathrop; Reb Russell; Jim Scott; Ed Walsh; Mellie Wolfgang	Catchers: Walt Kuhn; Wally Mayer; Ray Schalk; Billy Sullivan; Infielders: Scotty Alcock; Howard Baker; Joe Berger; Lena Blackburne; Jim Breton; Hal Chase; Jack Fournier; Harry Lord; Carl Manda; Buck Weaver	Outfielders: Ping Bodie; Larry Chappell; Shano Collins; Cecil Coombs; Tom Daly; Ray Demmitt; Irv Porter; Braggo Roth; Hank Schreiber; Polly Wolfe; Other positions: Delos Brown; Charlie Kavanagh	Manager: Nixey Callahan; Coaches: Kid Gleason

== Player stats ==
=== Batting ===
==== Starters by position ====
Note: Pos = Position; G = Games played; AB = At bats; H = Hits; Avg. = Batting average; HR = Home runs; RBI = Runs batted in

Pos	Player	G	AB	H	Avg.	HR	RBI
C	Ray Schalk	136	392	106	.270	0	36
1B	Jack Fournier	109	379	118	.311	6	44
2B	Lena Blackburne	144	479	105	.222	1	35
SS	Buck Weaver	136	541	133	.246	2	28
3B	Jim Breton	81	231	49	.212	0	24
OF	Ping Bodie	107	327	75	.229	3	29
OF	Shano Collins	154	598	164	.274	3	65
OF	Ray Demmitt	146	515	133	.258	2	46

==== Other batters ====
Note: G = Games played; AB = At bats; H = Hits; Avg. = Batting average; HR = Home runs; RBI = Runs batted in

Player	G	AB	H	Avg.	HR	RBI
Hal Chase	58	206	55	.267	0	20
Scotty Alcock	54	156	27	.173	0	7
Joe Berger	48	148	23	.155	0	3
Tom Daly	62	133	31	.233	0	8
Braggo Roth	34	126	37	.294	1	10
Wally Mayer	40	85	14	.165	0	5
Harry Lord	21	69	13	.188	1	3
Howard Baker	15	47	13	.277	0	5
Walt Kuhn	17	40	11	.225	0	0
Larry Chappell	21	39	9	.231	0	1
Polly Wolfe	8	28	6	.214	0	0
Cecil Coombs	7	23	4	.174	0	1
Carl Manda	9	15	4	.267	0	1
Charlie Kavanagh	6	5	1	.200	0	0
Irv Porter	1	4	1	.250	0	0
Hank Schreiber	1	2	0	.000	0	0
Delos Brown	1	1	0	.000	0	0
Billy Sullivan	1	0	0	----	0	0

=== Pitching ===
==== Starting pitchers ====
Note: G = Games pitched; IP = Innings pitched; W = Wins; L = Losses; ERA = Earned run average; SO = Strikeouts

Player	G	IP	W	L	ERA	SO
Joe Benz	48	283.1	14	19	2.26	142
Eddie Cicotte	45	269.1	11	16	2.04	122
Jim Scott	43	253.1	14	18	2.84	138

==== Other pitchers ====
Note: G = Games pitched; IP = Innings pitched; W = Wins; L = Losses; ERA = Earned run average; SO = Strikeouts

Player	G	IP	W	L	ERA	SO
Red Faber	40	181.1	10	9	2.68	88
Reb Russell	38	167.1	7	12	2.90	79
Mellie Wolfgang	24	119.1	9	5	1.89	50
Ed Walsh	8	44.2	2	3	2.82	15

==== Relief pitchers ====
Note: G = Games pitched; W = Wins; L = Losses; SV = Saves; ERA = Earned run average; SO = Strikeouts

Player	G	W	L	SV	ERA	SO
Bill Lathrop	19	1	2	0	2.64	7
Hi Jasper	16	1	0	0	3.34	19
