= 1913 Chicago White Sox season =

1913 Chicago White Sox
- League: American League
- Ballpark: Comiskey Park
- City: Chicago, Illinois
- Record: 78–74 (.513)
- League place: 5th
- Owners: Charles Comiskey
- Managers: Nixey Callahan

The 1913 Chicago White Sox season was a season in Major League Baseball. The team finished fifth in the American League with a record of 78–74, 17½ games behind the Philadelphia Athletics

== Regular season ==
=== Season standings ===
American League
Team	W	L	Pct.	GB	Home	Road
Philadelphia Athletics	96	57	.627	—	50‍–‍26	46‍–‍31
Washington Senators	90	64	.584	6½	42‍–‍35	48‍–‍29
Cleveland Naps	86	66	.566	9½	45‍–‍32	41‍–‍34
Boston Red Sox	79	71	.527	15½	41‍–‍34	38‍–‍37
Chicago White Sox	78	74	.513	17½	40‍–‍37	38‍–‍37
Detroit Tigers	66	87	.431	30	34‍–‍42	32‍–‍45
New York Yankees	57	94	.377	38	27‍–‍47	30‍–‍47
St. Louis Browns	57	96	.373	39	31‍–‍46	26‍–‍50

=== Record vs. opponents ===
1913 American League record Sources:
Team	BOS	CWS	CLE	DET	NYY	PHA	SLB	WSH
Boston	—	10–11	8–13	13–9	14–6–1	11–11	17–5	6–16
Chicago	11–10	—	9–13–1	13–9	11–10	11–11	12–10	11–11
Cleveland	13–8	13–9–1	—	14–7	14–8–1	9–13	16–6–1	7–15
Detroit	9–13	9–13	7–14	—	11–11	7–15	11–11	12–10
New York	6–14–1	10–11	8–14–1	11–11	—	5–17	11–11	6–16
Philadelphia	11–11	11–11	13–9	15–7	17–5	—	15–6	14–8
St. Louis	5–17	10–12	6–16–1	11–11	11–11	6–15	—	8–14–1
Washington	16–6	11–11	15–7	10–12	16–6	8–14	14–8–1	—

=== Roster ===
1913 Chicago White Sox
Roster
Pitchers: Joe Benz; Eddie Cicotte; Frank Lange; Bill Lathrop; Frank Miller; Buck O'Brien; Reb Russell; Jim Scoggins; Jim Scott; Bob Smith; Pop-Boy Smith; Ed Walsh; Doc White	Catchers: Tom Daly; Ted Easterly; Walt Kuhn; Wally Mayer; Billy Meyer; Ray Schalk; Infielders: Joe Berger; Babe Borton; Jim Breton; Hal Chase; Jack Fournier; Harry Lord; Don Rader; Morrie Rath; Buck Weaver; Rollie Zeider	Outfielders: Johnny Beall; Ping Bodie; Nixey Callahan; Larry Chappell; Shano Collins; Davy Jones; Wally Mattick; Edd Roush; Biff Schaller	Manager: Nixey Callahan; Coaches: Kid Gleason

== Player stats ==
=== Batting ===
==== Starters by position ====
Note: Pos = Position; G = Games played; AB = At bats; H = Hits; Avg. = Batting average; HR = Home runs; RBI = Runs batted in

Pos	Player	G	AB	H	Avg.	HR	RBI
C	Ray Schalk	129	401	98	.244	1	38
1B	Hal Chase	102	384	110	.286	2	39
2B	Morrie Rath	92	295	59	.200	0	12
SS	Buck Weaver	151	533	145	.272	4	52
3B	Harry Lord	150	547	144	.263	1	42
OF	Ping Bodie	127	406	107	.264	8	48
OF	Shano Collins	148	535	128	.239	1	47
OF	Wally Mattick	71	207	39	.188	0	11

==== Other batters ====
Note: G = Games played; AB = At bats; H = Hits; Avg. = Batting average; HR = Home runs; RBI = Runs batted in

Player	G	AB	H	Avg.	HR	RBI
Joe Berger	79	223	48	.215	2	20
Larry Chappell	60	208	48	.231	0	15
Jack Fournier	68	172	40	.233	1	23
Ted Easterly	60	97	23	.237	0	8
Biff Schaller	36	96	21	.219	0	4
Babe Borton	28	80	22	.275	0	13
Johnny Beall	17	60	16	.267	2	3
Walt Kuhn	26	50	8	.160	0	5
Jim Breton	12	30	5	.167	0	2
Davy Jones	12	21	6	.286	0	0
Rollie Zeider	16	20	7	.350	0	2
Edd Roush	9	10	1	.100	0	0
Nixey Callahan	6	9	2	.222	0	1
Tom Daly	1	3	0	.000	0	0
Don Rader	4	3	1	.333	0	0
Billy Meyer	1	1	1	1.000	0	0

=== Pitching ===
==== Starting pitchers ====
Note: G = Games pitched; IP = Innings pitched; W = Wins; L = Losses; ERA = Earned run average; SO = Strikeouts

Player	G	IP	W	L	ERA	SO
Reb Russell	52	316.2	22	16	1.90	122
Jim Scott	48	312.1	20	20	1.90	158
Eddie Cicotte	41	268.0	18	12	1.58	121
Ed Walsh	16	97.2	8	3	2.58	34
Frank Miller	1	1.2	0	1	27.00	2
Jim Scoggins	1	0.0	0	1	---	0

==== Other pitchers ====
Note: G = Games pitched; IP = Innings pitched; W = Wins; L = Losses; ERA = Earned run average; SO = Strikeouts

Player	G	IP	W	L	ERA	SO
Joe Benz	33	151.0	7	10	2.74	79
Doc White	19	103.0	2	4	3.50	39
Frank Lange	12	40.2	1	3	4.87	20
Buck O'Brien	6	18.1	0	2	3.93	4

==== Relief pitchers ====
Note: G = Games pitched; W = Wins; L = Losses; SV = Saves; ERA = Earned run average; SO = Strikeouts

Player	G	W	L	SV	ERA	SO
Pop-Boy Smith	15	0	1	0	3.38	13
Bill Lathrop	6	0	1	0	4.24	9
Bob Smith	1	0	0	0	13.50	1
