= 1914 Boston Red Sox season =

Major League Baseball season

1914 Boston Red Sox
- League: American League
- Ballpark: Fenway Park
- City: Boston, Massachusetts
- Record: 91–62 (.595)
- League place: 2nd
- Owners: John I. Taylor; Joseph Lannin
- Managers: Bill Carrigan
- Stats: ESPN.com; Baseball Reference

The 1914 Boston Red Sox season was the 14th season in the franchise's Major League Baseball history. The Red Sox finished second in the American League (AL) with a record of 91 wins and 62 losses, 8 1/2 games behind the Philadelphia Athletics. The team played its home games at Fenway Park.

== Offseason ==
=== Transactions ===
August 14, 1913: The Red Sox purchase outfielder Wally Rehg from the St. Paul Saints for $10,000.

== Regular season ==
=== Season standings ===
American League
Team	W	L	Pct.	GB	Home	Road
Philadelphia Athletics	99	53	.651	—	51‍–‍24	48‍–‍29
Boston Red Sox	91	62	.595	8½	44‍–‍31	47‍–‍31
Washington Senators	81	73	.526	19	40‍–‍33	41‍–‍40
Detroit Tigers	80	73	.523	19½	42‍–‍35	38‍–‍38
St. Louis Browns	71	82	.464	28½	42‍–‍36	29‍–‍46
Chicago White Sox	70	84	.455	30	43‍–‍37	27‍–‍47
New York Yankees	70	84	.455	30	36‍–‍40	34‍–‍44
Cleveland Naps	51	102	.333	48½	32‍–‍47	19‍–‍55

=== Record vs. opponents ===
1914 American League record Sources:
Team	BOS	CWS	CLE	DET	NYH	PHA	SLB	WSH
Boston	—	13–9	16–6	15–7–1	11–11	12–9–3	13–9–2	11–11
Chicago	9–13	—	13–9	6–16	12–10–1	5–17	13–9–1	12–10–1
Cleveland	6–16	9–13	—	6–16	8–14–1	3–19	8–13–2	11–11–1
Detroit	7–15–1	16–6	16–6	—	13–9–1	9–12–1	9–13	10–12–1
New York	11–11	10–12–1	14–8–1	9–13–1	—	8–14	11–11	7–15
Philadelphia	9–12–3	17–5	19–3	12–9–1	14–8	—	15–7–1	13–9–1
St. Louis	9–13–2	9–13–1	13–8–2	13–9	11–11	7–15–1	—	9–13
Washington	11–11	10–12–1	11–11–1	12–10–1	15–7	9–13–1	13–9	—

=== Opening Day lineup ===
Harry Hooper	RF
Clyde Engle	1B
Tris Speaker	CF
Duffy Lewis	LF
Larry Gardner	3B
Steve Yerkes	2B
Everett Scott	SS
Bill Carrigan	C
Ray Collins	P

=== Notable transactions ===
- July 9, 1914: The Red Sox purchase pitchers Babe Ruth and Ernie Shore as well as catcher Ben Egan from the Baltimore Orioles for between $25,000 and $30,000.

=== Roster ===
1914 Boston Red Sox
Roster
Pitchers: Hugh Bedient; Ray Collins; Guy Cooper; Fritz Coumbe; Rube Foster; Vean Gregg; Rankin Johnson; Ed Kelly; Dutch Leonard; Babe Ruth; Ernie Shore; Smoky Joe Wood; Matt Zeiser	Catchers: Hick Cady; Bill Carrigan; Les Nunamaker; Larry Pratt; Pinch Thomas; Infielders: Clyde Engle; Del Gainer; Larry Gardner; Dick Hoblitzel; Hal Janvrin; Everett Scott; Bill Swanson; George F. Wilson; Steve Yerkes	Outfielders: Olaf Henriksen; Harry Hooper; Duffy Lewis; Wally Rehg; Tris Speaker	Manager: Bill Carrigan

== Player stats ==
=== Batting ===
==== Starters by position ====
Note: Pos = Position; G = Games played; AB = At bats; H = Hits; Avg. = Batting average; HR = Home runs; RBI = Runs batted in

Pos	Player	G	AB	H	Avg.	HR	RBI
C	Bill Carrigan	82	178	45	.253	1	22
1B	Dick Hoblitzell	69	229	73	.319	0	33
2B	Steve Yerkes	92	293	64	.218	1	23
SS	Everett Scott	144	539	129	.239	2	37
3B	Larry Gardner	155	553	143	.259	3	68
OF	Tris Speaker	158	571	193	.338	4	90
OF	Duffy Lewis	146	510	142	.278	2	79
OF	Harry Hooper	142	530	137	.258	1	41

==== Other batters ====
Note: G = Games played; AB = At bats; H = Hits; Avg. = Batting average; HR = Home runs; RBI = Runs batted in

Player	G	AB	H	Avg.	HR	RBI
Hal Janvrin	145	492	117	.238	1	51
Hick Cady	61	159	41	.258	0	8
Wally Rehg	88	151	33	.219	0	11
Clyde Engle	59	134	26	.194	0	9
Pinch Thomas	66	130	25	.192	0	5
Olaf Henriksen	63	95	25	.263	1	5
Del Gainer	38	84	20	.238	2	13
Bill Swanson	11	20	4	.200	0	0
Les Nunamaker	5	5	1	.200	0	0
Larry Pratt	5	4	0	.000	0	0
George F. Wilson	1	0	0	----	0	0

=== Pitching ===
==== Starting pitchers ====
Note: G = Games pitched; IP = Innings pitched; W = Wins; L = Losses; ERA = Earned run average; SO = Strikeouts

Player	G	IP	W	L	ERA	SO
Ray Collins	39	272.1	20	13	2.51	72
Dutch Leonard	36	224.2	19	5	0.96	176
Rube Foster	32	211.2	14	8	1.70	89
Ernie Shore	20	139.2	10	5	2.00	51
Smoky Joe Wood	18	113.1	10	3	2.62	67
Rankin Johnson Sr.	16	99.1	3	9	3.08	24

==== Other pitchers ====
Note: G = Games pitched; IP = Innings pitched; W = Wins; L = Losses; ERA = Earned run average; SO = Strikeouts

Player	G	IP	W	L	ERA	SO
Hugh Bedient	42	177.1	8	12	3.60	70
Vean Gregg	12	68.1	3	4	3.95	24
Fritz Coumbe	17	62.1	1	2	1.44	17
Babe Ruth	4	23.0	2	1	3.91	3

==== Relief pitchers ====
Note: G = Games pitched; W = Wins; L = Losses; SV = Saves; ERA = Earned run average; SO = Strikeouts

Player	G	W	L	SV	ERA	SO
Guy Cooper	9	1	0	0	5.32	5
Ed Kelly	3	0	0	0	0.00	4
Matt Zieser	2	0	0	0	1.80	0
Tris Speaker	1	0	0	0	9.00	0
