= 1914 St. Louis Browns season =

Major League Baseball season

1914 St. Louis Browns
- League: American League
- Ballpark: Sportsman's Park
- City: St. Louis, Missouri
- Record: 71–82 (.464)
- League place: 5th
- Owners: Robert Hedges
- Managers: Branch Rickey

The 1914 St. Louis Browns season involved the Browns finishing 5th in the American League with a record of 71 wins and 82 losses.

== Regular season ==
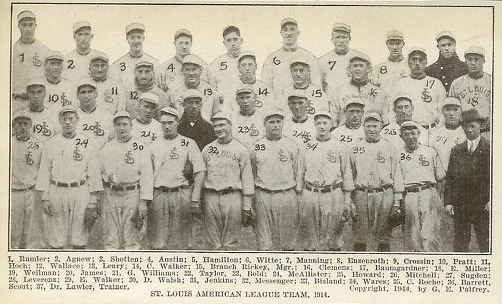
The 1914 St. Louis Browns.

=== Season standings ===
American League
Team	W	L	Pct.	GB	Home	Road
Philadelphia Athletics	99	53	.651	—	51‍–‍24	48‍–‍29
Boston Red Sox	91	62	.595	8½	44‍–‍31	47‍–‍31
Washington Senators	81	73	.526	19	40‍–‍33	41‍–‍40
Detroit Tigers	80	73	.523	19½	42‍–‍35	38‍–‍38
St. Louis Browns	71	82	.464	28½	42‍–‍36	29‍–‍46
Chicago White Sox	70	84	.455	30	43‍–‍37	27‍–‍47
New York Yankees	70	84	.455	30	36‍–‍40	34‍–‍44
Cleveland Naps	51	102	.333	48½	32‍–‍47	19‍–‍55

=== Record vs. opponents ===
1914 American League record Sources:
Team	BOS	CWS	CLE	DET	NYH	PHA	SLB	WSH
Boston	—	13–9	16–6	15–7–1	11–11	12–9–3	13–9–2	11–11
Chicago	9–13	—	13–9	6–16	12–10–1	5–17	13–9–1	12–10–1
Cleveland	6–16	9–13	—	6–16	8–14–1	3–19	8–13–2	11–11–1
Detroit	7–15–1	16–6	16–6	—	13–9–1	9–12–1	9–13	10–12–1
New York	11–11	10–12–1	14–8–1	9–13–1	—	8–14	11–11	7–15
Philadelphia	9–12–3	17–5	19–3	12–9–1	14–8	—	15–7–1	13–9–1
St. Louis	9–13–2	9–13–1	13–8–2	13–9	11–11	7–15–1	—	9–13
Washington	11–11	10–12–1	11–11–1	12–10–1	15–7	9–13–1	13–9	—

=== Notable transactions ===
- May 1914: Jack Enzenroth jumped from the Browns to the Kansas City Packers.

=== Roster ===
1914 St. Louis Browns roster
Roster
Pitchers: Grover Baichley; George Baumgardner; Earl Hamilton; Harry Hoch; Bill James; Walt Leverenz; Ernie Manning; Roy Mitchell; Allen Sothoron; Wiley Taylor; Carl Weilman	Catchers: Sam Agnew; Frank Crossin; Jack Enzenroth; George Hale; Joe Jenkins; Bill Rumler; Infielders: Jimmy Austin; Charlie Bold; Ed Hemingway; Ivan Howard; Dick Kauffman; Doc Lavan; John Leary; Ed Miller; Del Pratt; Bobby Wallace; Dee Walsh; Buzzy Wares	Outfielders: Tim Bowden; Bob Clemens; Bobby Messenger; Burt Shotton; Ernie Walker; Tilly Walker; Gus Williams; Other batters: Branch Rickey; Dutch Schirick	Manager: Branch Rickey

== Player stats ==
=== Batting ===
==== Starters by position ====
Note: Pos = Position; G = Games played; AB = At bats; H = Hits; Avg. = Batting average; HR = Home runs; RBI = Runs batted in

Pos	Player	G	AB	H	Avg.	HR	RBI
C	Sam Agnew	115	311	66	.212	0	16
1B	John Leary	144	533	141	.265	0	45
2B	Del Pratt	158	584	165	.283	5	65
SS	Doc Lavan	75	239	63	.264	1	21
3B	Jimmy Austin	130	466	111	.238	0	30
OF	Tilly Walker	151	517	154	.298	6	78
OF	Burt Shotton	154	579	156	.269	0	38
OF	Gus Williams	144	499	126	.253	4	47

==== Other batters ====
Note: G = Games played; AB = At bats; H = Hits; Avg. = Batting average; HR = Home runs; RBI = Runs batted in

Player	G	AB	H	Avg.	HR	RBI
Buzzy Wares	81	215	45	.209	0	23
Ivan Howard	81	209	51	.244	0	20
Ernie Walker	74	131	39	.298	1	14
Frank Crossin	43	90	11	.122	0	5
Bobby Wallace	26	73	16	.219	0	5
Ed Miller	41	58	8	.138	0	4
William Rumler	34	46	8	.174	0	6
Joe Jenkins	19	32	4	.125	0	0
Dee Walsh	7	23	2	.087	0	1
Dick Kauffman	7	15	4	.267	0	2
Bob Clemens	7	13	3	.231	0	3
George Hale	6	11	2	.182	0	0
Tim Bowden	7	9	2	.222	0	0
Jack Enzenroth	3	6	1	.167	0	0
Ed Hemingway	3	5	0	.000	0	0
Ernie Manning	7	4	0	.000	0	0
Branch Rickey	2	2	0	.000	0	0
Bobby Messenger	1	2	0	.000	0	0
Charlie Bold	2	1	0	.000	0	0
Dutch Schirick	1	0	0	----	0	0

=== Pitching ===
==== Starting pitchers ====
Note: G = Games pitched; IP = Innings pitched; W = Wins; L = Losses; ERA = Earned run average; SO = Strikeouts

Player	G	IP	W	L	ERA	SO
Earl Hamilton	44	302.1	16	18	2.50	111
Carl Weilman	44	299.0	17	12	2.08	119
Bill James	44	284.0	15	14	2.85	109

==== Other pitchers ====
Note: G = Games pitched; IP = Innings pitched; W = Wins; L = Losses; ERA = Earned run average; SO = Strikeouts

Player	G	IP	W	L	ERA	SO
George Baumgardner	45	183.2	16	14	2.79	93
Walt Leverenz	27	111.1	1	12	3.80	41
Roy Mitchell	28	103.1	4	5	4.35	38
Harry Hoch	15	54.0	0	2	3.00	13
Wiley Taylor	16	50.0	2	5	3.42	20

==== Relief pitchers ====
Note: G = Games pitched; W = Wins; L = Losses; SV = Saves; ERA = Earned run average; SO = Strikeouts

Player	G	W	L	SV	ERA	SO
Ernie Manning	4	0	0	0	3.60	3
Grover Baichley	4	0	0	0	5.14	3
Allan Sothoron	1	0	0	0	6.00	3
