= 1914 Washington Senators season =

1914 Washington Senators
- League: American League
- Ballpark: National Park
- City: Washington, D.C.
- Record: 81–73 (.526)
- League place: 3rd
- Owners: Thomas C. Noyes
- Managers: Clark Griffith

The 1914 Washington Senators won 81 games, lost 73, and finished in third place in the American League. They were managed by Clark Griffith and played home games at National Park.

== Regular season ==
=== Season standings ===
American League
Team	W	L	Pct.	GB	Home	Road
Philadelphia Athletics	99	53	.651	—	51‍–‍24	48‍–‍29
Boston Red Sox	91	62	.595	8½	44‍–‍31	47‍–‍31
Washington Senators	81	73	.526	19	40‍–‍33	41‍–‍40
Detroit Tigers	80	73	.523	19½	42‍–‍35	38‍–‍38
St. Louis Browns	71	82	.464	28½	42‍–‍36	29‍–‍46
Chicago White Sox	70	84	.455	30	43‍–‍37	27‍–‍47
New York Yankees	70	84	.455	30	36‍–‍40	34‍–‍44
Cleveland Naps	51	102	.333	48½	32‍–‍47	19‍–‍55

=== Record vs. opponents ===
1914 American League record Sources:
Team	BOS	CWS	CLE	DET	NYH	PHA	SLB	WSH
Boston	—	13–9	16–6	15–7–1	11–11	12–9–3	13–9–2	11–11
Chicago	9–13	—	13–9	6–16	12–10–1	5–17	13–9–1	12–10–1
Cleveland	6–16	9–13	—	6–16	8–14–1	3–19	8–13–2	11–11–1
Detroit	7–15–1	16–6	16–6	—	13–9–1	9–12–1	9–13	10–12–1
New York	11–11	10–12–1	14–8–1	9–13–1	—	8–14	11–11	7–15
Philadelphia	9–12–3	17–5	19–3	12–9–1	14–8	—	15–7–1	13–9–1
St. Louis	9–13–2	9–13–1	13–8–2	13–9	11–11	7–15–1	—	9–13
Washington	11–11	10–12–1	11–11–1	12–10–1	15–7	9–13–1	13–9	—

=== Roster ===
1914 Washington Senators
Roster
Pitchers: Nick Altrock; Doc Ayers; Frank Barron; Jack Bentley; Joe Boehling; Carl Cashion; Joe Engel; Bert Gallia; Clark Griffith; Harry Harper; Walter Johnson; Jim Shaw; Jim Stevens; Mutt Williams	Catchers: Eddie Ainsmith; John Henry; Rip Williams; Tom Wilson; Infielders: Eddie Foster; Chick Gandil; George McBride; Ray Morgan; Doug Neff; Germany Schaefer; Wally Smith	Outfielders: Merito Acosta; Joe Gedeon; Irish Meusel; Clyde Milan; Mike Mitchell; Danny Moeller; Charlie Pick; Howie Shanks	Manager: Clark Griffith

== Player stats ==
=== Batting ===
==== Starters by position ====
Note: Pos = Position; G = Games played; AB = At bats; H = Hits; Avg. = Batting average; HR = Home runs; RBI = Runs batted in

Pos	Player	G	AB	H	Avg.	HR	RBI
C	John Henry	92	261	44	.169	0	20
1B	Chick Gandil	145	526	136	.259	3	75
2B	Ray Morgan	147	491	126	.257	1	49
SS	George McBride	157	503	102	.203	0	24
3B	Eddie Foster	157	616	174	.282	2	50
OF	Clyde Milan	115	437	129	.295	1	39
OF	Danny Moeller	151	571	143	.250	1	45
OF	Howie Shanks	143	500	112	.224	4	64

==== Other batters ====
Note: G = Games played; AB = At bats; H = Hits; Avg. = Batting average; HR = Home runs; RBI = Runs batted in

Player	G	AB	H	Avg.	HR	RBI
Mike Mitchell	55	193	55	.285	1	20
Rip Williams	81	169	47	.278	1	22
Eddie Ainsmith	62	151	34	.225	0	13
Wally Smith	45	97	19	.196	0	8
Merito Acosta	39	74	19	.257	0	4
Germany Schaefer	30	29	7	.241	0	2
Charlie Pick	10	23	9	.391	0	1
Joe Gedeon	4	2	0	.000	0	1
Doug Neff	3	2	0	.000	0	0
Irish Meusel	1	2	0	.000	0	0
Tom Wilson	1	1	0	.000	0	0

=== Pitching ===
==== Starting pitchers ====
Note: G = Games pitched; IP = Innings pitched; W = Wins; L = Losses; ERA = Earned run average; SO = Strikeouts

Player	G	IP	W	L	ERA	SO
Walter Johnson	51	371.2	28	18	1.72	225
Doc Ayers	49	265.1	11	15	2.54	148
Jim Shaw	48	257.0	15	17	2.70	164
Joe Boehling	27	196.0	13	8	3.03	91

==== Other pitchers ====
Note: G = Games pitched; IP = Innings pitched; W = Wins; L = Losses; ERA = Earned run average; SO = Strikeouts

Player	G	IP	W	L	ERA	SO
Jack Bentley	30	125.1	5	7	2.37	55
Joe Engel	35	124.1	7	5	2.97	41
Harry Harper	23	57.0	2	1	3.47	50
Carl Cashion	2	5.0	0	1	10.80	1

==== Relief pitchers ====
Note: G = Games pitched; W = Wins; L = Losses; SV = Saves; ERA = Earned run average; SO = Strikeouts

Player	G	W	L	SV	ERA	SO
Mutt Williams	5	0	0	1	5.14	3
Bert Gallia	2	0	0	0	4.50	4
Jim Stevens	2	0	0	0	9.00	0
Nick Altrock	1	0	0	0	0.00	0
Clark Griffith	1	0	0	0	0.00	1
Frank Barron	1	0	0	0	0.00	1
