= William Lathrop =

William Lathrop may refer to:

- William Lathrop (politician) (1825–1907), U.S. Representative from Illinois.
- William Langson Lathrop (1859–1938), American landscape painter
- William Addison Lathrop, American author, playwright, and screenwriter
- Bill Lathrop (1891–1958), American baseball pitcher
