= Carl Manda =

Major League baseball player (1886–1983)

- Second baseman
- Born: November 16, 1886; Little River, Kansas, U.S.
- Died: March 9, 1983 (aged 96); Artesia, New Mexico, U.S.
- Batted: Right Threw: Right

MLB debut
- September 11, 1914, for the Chicago White Sox

Last MLB appearance
- September 22, 1914, for the Chicago White Sox

MLB statistics
- Games played: 9
- At bats: 15
- Hits: 4
- Stats at Baseball Reference

Teams
- Chicago White Sox (1914)

Carl Alan Manda (November 16, 1886 – March 9, 1983) was an American professional baseball second baseman in Major League Baseball, who played in nine games for the Chicago White Sox in 1914. At the time of his death, he was the oldest living former major league player.

Records
Preceded by Jack Snyder	Oldest recognized verified living baseball player December 13, 1981 – March 9, 1983	Succeeded by John Daley
