= 1914 Detroit Tigers season =

Major League Baseball season

1914 Detroit Tigers
- League: American League
- Ballpark: Navin Field
- City: Detroit
- Record: 80–73 (.523)
- League place: 4th
- Owners: William H. Yawkey and Frank Navin
- Managers: Hughie Jennings

The 1914 Detroit Tigers season was a season in American baseball. It involved the Detroit Tigers finishing fourth in the American League.

Ty Cobb won another batting title with a .368 average. Sam Crawford led the league in RBI and was second in MVP voting.

== Regular season ==
=== Season standings ===
American League
Team	W	L	Pct.	GB	Home	Road
Philadelphia Athletics	99	53	.651	—	51‍–‍24	48‍–‍29
Boston Red Sox	91	62	.595	8½	44‍–‍31	47‍–‍31
Washington Senators	81	73	.526	19	40‍–‍33	41‍–‍40
Detroit Tigers	80	73	.523	19½	42‍–‍35	38‍–‍38
St. Louis Browns	71	82	.464	28½	42‍–‍36	29‍–‍46
Chicago White Sox	70	84	.455	30	43‍–‍37	27‍–‍47
New York Yankees	70	84	.455	30	36‍–‍40	34‍–‍44
Cleveland Naps	51	102	.333	48½	32‍–‍47	19‍–‍55

=== Record vs. opponents ===
1914 American League record Sources:
Team	BOS	CWS	CLE	DET	NYH	PHA	SLB	WSH
Boston	—	13–9	16–6	15–7–1	11–11	12–9–3	13–9–2	11–11
Chicago	9–13	—	13–9	6–16	12–10–1	5–17	13–9–1	12–10–1
Cleveland	6–16	9–13	—	6–16	8–14–1	3–19	8–13–2	11–11–1
Detroit	7–15–1	16–6	16–6	—	13–9–1	9–12–1	9–13	10–12–1
New York	11–11	10–12–1	14–8–1	9–13–1	—	8–14	11–11	7–15
Philadelphia	9–12–3	17–5	19–3	12–9–1	14–8	—	15–7–1	13–9–1
St. Louis	9–13–2	9–13–1	13–8–2	13–9	11–11	7–15–1	—	9–13
Washington	11–11	10–12–1	11–11–1	12–10–1	15–7	9–13–1	13–9	—

=== Roster ===
1914 Detroit Tigers
Roster
Pitchers: George Boehler; Pug Cavet; Harry Coveleski; Hooks Dauss; Jean Dubuc; Marc Hall; Alex Main; Ed McCreery; Red Oldham; Ross Reynolds; Johnnie Williams; Lefty Williams	Catchers: Del Baker; Red McKee; Oscar Stanage; Infielders: Paddy Baumann; George Burns; Donie Bush; Del Gainer; Marty Kavanagh; Fred McMullin; George Moriarty; Billy Purtell; Ossie Vitt	Outfielders: Ty Cobb; Sam Crawford; Harry Heilmann; Hugh High; Bobby Veach; Other batters: Ray Demmitt	Manager: Hughie Jennings; Coaches: Jimmy Burke; Deacon McGuire

== Player stats ==
=== Batting ===
==== Starters by position ====
Note: Pos = Position; G = Games played; AB = At bats; H = Hits; Avg. = Batting average; HR = Home runs; RBI = Runs batted in

Pos	Player	G	AB	H	Avg.	HR	RBI
C	Oscar Stanage	122	400	77	.193	0	25
1B	George Burns	137	478	129	.291	5	57
2B	Marty Kavanagh	128	439	109	.248	4	35
3B	George Moriarty	132	465	118	.254	1	40
SS	Donie Bush	157	596	150	.252	0	32
OF	Sam Crawford	157	582	183	.314	8	104
OF	Ty Cobb	98	345	127	.368	2	57
OF	Bobby Veach	149	531	146	.275	1	72

==== Other batters ====
Note: G = Games played; AB = At bats; H = Hits; Avg. = Batting average; HR = Home runs; RBI = Runs batted in

Player	G	AB	H	Avg.	HR	RBI
Ossie Vitt	66	195	49	.251	0	8
Hugh High	84	184	49	.266	0	17
Harry Heilmann	69	182	41	.225	2	18
Billy Purtell	28	76	13	.171	0	3
Del Baker	44	70	15	.214	0	1
Red McKee	34	64	12	.188	0	8
Paddy Baumann	3	11	0	.000	0	0
Fred McMullin	1	1	0	.000	0	0
Del Gainer	1	0	0	----	0	0
Ray Demmitt	1	0	0	----	0	0

=== Pitching ===
==== Starting pitchers ====
Note: G = Games pitched; IP = Innings pitched; W = Wins; L = Losses; ERA = Earned run average; SO = Strikeouts

Player	G	IP	W	L	ERA	SO
Harry Coveleski	44	303.1	22	12	2.49	124
Hooks Dauss	45	302.0	18	15	2.86	150
Jean Dubuc	36	224.0	13	14	3.46	70
Red Oldham	9	45.1	2	4	3.38	23
Lefty Williams	1	1.0	0	1	0.00	0

==== Other pitchers ====
Note: G = Games pitched; IP = Innings pitched; W = Wins; L = Losses; ERA = Earned run average; SO = Strikeouts

Player	G	IP	W	L	ERA	SO
Pug Cavet	31	151.1	7	7	2.44	51
Alex Main	32	138.1	6	6	2.67	55
Marc Hall	25	90.1	4	6	2.69	18
Ross Reynolds	26	78.0	5	3	2.08	31
George Boehler	18	63.0	2	3	3.57	37
Johnnie Williams	4	11.1	0	2	6.35	4
Ed McCreery	3	4.0	1	0	11.25	1

== Awards and honors ==
=== League top five finishers ===
Donie Bush

- #4 in AL in runs scored (97)

Ty Cobb

- MLB leader in on-base percentage (.466)
- AL leader in batting average (.368)
- AL leader in slugging percentage (.513)

Harry Coveleski

- #2 in AL in wins (22)

Sam Crawford

- AL leader in RBI (104)
- #3 in AL in slugging percentage (.483)
