= Jim Stevens (baseball) =

American baseball player (1889-1966)

- Pitcher
- Born: August 25, 1889; Williamsburg, Maryland
- Died: September 25, 1966 (aged 77); Baltimore, Maryland
- Batted: Right Threw: Right

MLB debut
- August 24, 1914, for the Washington Senators

Last MLB appearance
- September 8, 1914, for the Washington Senators

MLB statistics
- Win–loss record: 0–0
- Earned run average: 9.00
- Strikeouts: 0
- Stats at Baseball Reference

Teams
- Washington Senators (1914)

James Arthur Stevens (August 25, 1889 – September 25, 1966), nicknamed "Steve", was an American professional baseball player who played in two games for the Washington Senators during the 1914 season. He was born in Williamsburg, Maryland and died in Baltimore, Maryland at the age of 77.
