= Mutt Williams (baseball) =

American baseball player (1892-1962)

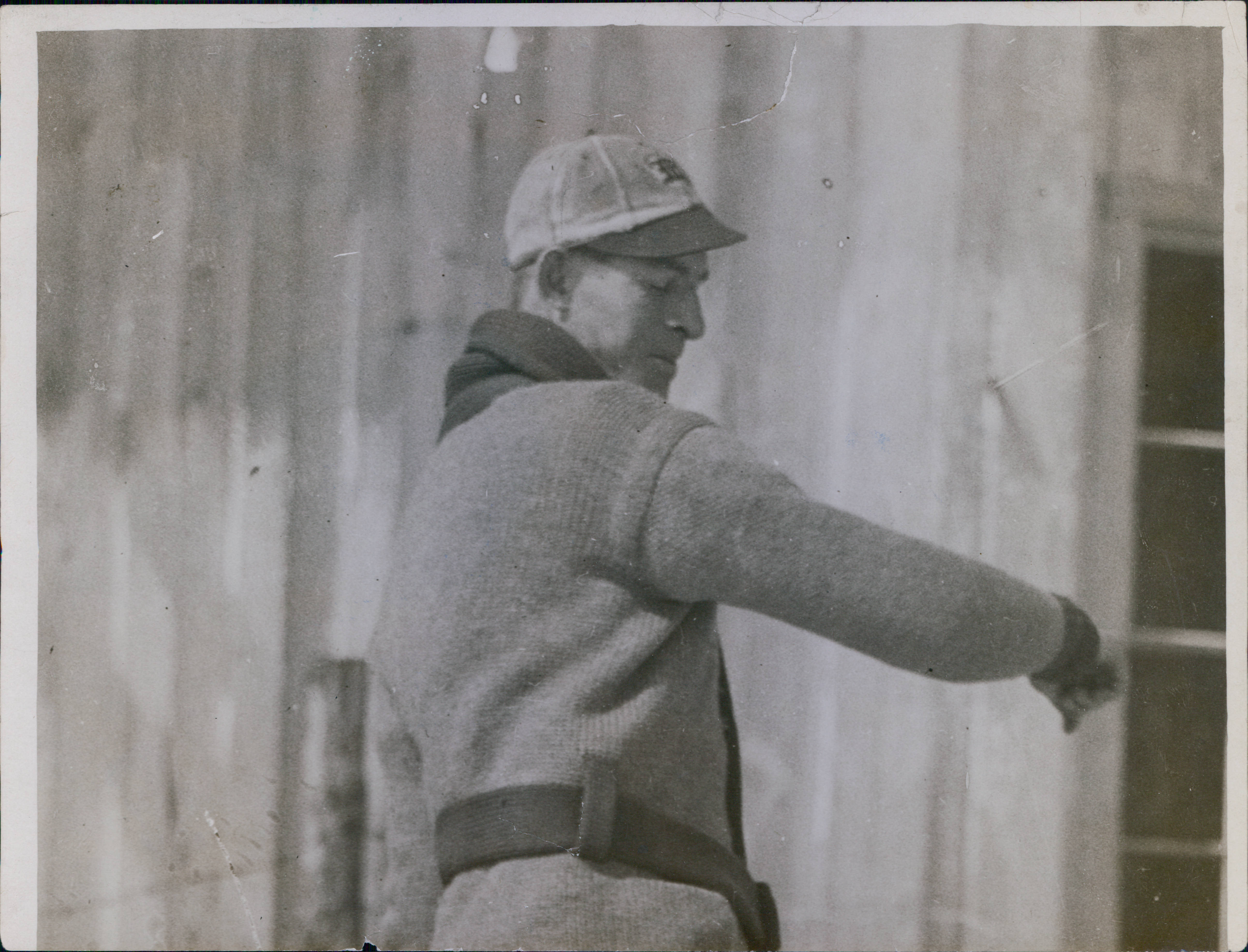
- Pitcher
- Born: July 31, 1892; Ozark, Arkansas, U.S.
- Died: March 30, 1962 (aged 69); Fayetteville, Arkansas, U.S.
- Batted: Right Threw: Right

MLB debut
- October 4, 1913, for the Washington Senators

Last MLB appearance
- October 1, 1914, for the Washington Senators

MLB statistics
- Win–loss record: 1–0
- Earned run average: 4.91
- Strikeouts: 4
- Stats at Baseball Reference

Teams
- Washington Senators (1913–1914)

David Carter "Mutt" Williams (July 31, 1892 – March 30, 1962) was an American Major League Baseball pitcher who played with the Washington Senators in 1913 and 1914. He batted and threw right-handed.
