= Bob Clemens =

Bob Clemens may refer to:

- Bob Clemens (American football) (born 1933), former fullback in the National Football League
- Bob Clemens (baseball) (1886–1964), Major League Baseball outfielder
