= List of Phi Sigma chapters =

American biology honor society chapters

Phi Sigma is a college honor society for biological sciences. In the following chapter list, active chapters are indicated in bold and inactive chapters are in italics.

Chapter	Charter date and range	Institution	Location	Status	Ref.
**Alpha**	1915	Ohio State University	Columbus, Ohio	Active	
**Beta**	1916	University of Michigan	Ann Arbor, Michigan	Active	
**Gamma**	1916	North Dakota State University	Fargo, North Dakota	Active	
**Delta**	1917	University of Maine	Orono, Maine	Active	
**Epsilon**	1917	University of Denver	Denver, Colorado	Active	
**Zeta**	1917	University of Wisconsin–Madison	Madison, Wisconsin	Active	
**Eta**	1921	University of Akron	Akron, Ohio	Active	
**Theta**	1921	Michigan State University	East Lansing, Michigan	Active	
**Iota**	1921	Washington University in St. Louis	St. Louis, Missouri	Active	
**Kappa**	1921	University of Kansas	Lawrence, Kansas	Active	
**Lambda**	1921	University of Montana	Missoula, Montana	Active	
**Mu**	1922	University of California, Berkeley	Berkeley, California	Active	
**Nu**	1922	Washington & Jefferson College	Washington, Pennsylvania	Active	
**Xi**	1924	University of Nebraska–Lincoln	Lincoln, Nebraska	Active	
**Omicron**	1924	University of North Dakota	Grand Forks, North Dakota	Active	
**Pi**	1925	Emory University	Atlanta, Georgia	Active	
**Rho**	1925	University of Illinois at Urbana–Champaign	Urbana, Illinois	Active	
**Sigma**	1925	University of Florida	Gainesville, Florida	Active	
**Tau**	1926	Duke University	Durham, North Carolina	Active	
**Upsilon**	1926	Miami University	Oxford, Ohio	Active	
**Phi**	1926	University of New Hampshire	Durham, New Hampshire	Active	
**Chi**	1927	Montana State University	Bozeman, Montana	Active	
**Psi**	1928	University of Washington	Seattle, Washington	Active	
**Omega**	1928	University of Oklahoma	Norman, Oklahoma	Active	
**Alpha Alpha**	1928	University of Southern California (USC)	Los Angeles, California	Active	
**Alpha Beta**	1928	University of Mount Union	Alliance, Ohio	Active	
**Alpha Gamma**	1928	University of South Dakota	Vermillion, South Dakota	Active	
**Alpha Delta**	1929	Lawrence University	Appleton, Wisconsin	Active	
**Alpha Epsilon**	1929	University of Pittsburgh	Pittsburgh, Pennsylvania	Active	
**Alpha Zeta**	1930	College of William & Mary	Williamsburg, Maryland	Active	
**Alpha Eta**	1930	Oklahoma State University–Stillwater	Stillwater, Oklahoma	Active	
**Alpha Theta**	1930	Washington State University	Pullman, Washington	Active	
**Alpha Iota**	1932	Bucknell University	Lewisburg, Pennsylvania	Active	
**Alpha Kappa**	1932	Hunter College	New York City, New York	Active	
**Alpha Lambda**	1932	University of Utah	Salt Lake City, Utah	Active	
**Alpha Mu**	1933	University of Oregon	Eugene, Oregon	Active	
**Alpha Nu**	1935	University of New Mexico	Albuquerque, New Mexico	Active	
**Alpha Xi**	1935	University of Rhode Island	Kingston, Rhode Island	Active	
**Alpha Omicron**	1938	Marquette University	Milwaukee, Wisconsin	Active	
**Alpha Pi**	1941	University of Colorado Boulder	Boulder, Colorado	Active	
**Alpha Rho**	1945	University of Arkansas	Fayetteville, Arkansas	Active	
**Alpha Sigma**	1946	University of Texas at Austin	Austin, Texas	Active	
**Alpha Tau**	1947	National University of Mexico	Mexico City, Mexico	Active	(Note: The institution's name in Spanish is Universidad Nacional Autónoma de México.)
**Alpha Upsilon**	1947	University of California, Los Angeles	Los Angeles, California	Active	(Note: The name of the Alpha Upsilon chapter on the Phi Sigma website had a typo at the creation of this page. Previously, a Gamma Kappa chapter was also listed at UCLA on the Society's website, but the Society's HQ reports this is an error that will be fixed. That designation has not been used and should be blank.)
**Alpha Phi**	1948	University of Puget Sound	Tacoma, Washington	Active	
**Alpha Chi**	1949	University of the Philippines Manila	Ermita, Manila, Philippines	Active	
**Alpha Psi**	1949	Virginia Tech	Blacksburg, Virginia	Active	
**Alpha Omega**	1951	University of Georgia	Athens, Georgia	Active	
**Beta Alpha**	1955	Pennsylvania State University	State College, Pennsylvania	Active	
**Beta Beta**	1956	Florida State University	Tallahassee, Florida	Active	
**Beta Gamma**	1957	Long Island University	Brooklyn, New York	Active	(Note: LIU's Brooklyn campus houses the Richard L. Conolly College of Liberal Arts & Sciences, home of the Dept. of Biology.)
**Beta Delta**	1958	University of Virginia	Charlottesville, Virginia	Active	
**Beta Epsilon**	1960	Northern Illinois University	DeKalb, Illinois	Active	
**Beta Zeta**	1961	University of Maryland, College Park	College Park, Maryland	Active	
**Beta Eta**	1962	University of Idaho	Moscow, Idaho	Active	
**Beta Theta**	1963	North Carolina State University	Raleigh, North Carolina	Active	
**Beta Iota**	1964	Duquesne University	Pittsburgh, Pennsylvania	Active	
**Beta Kappa**	1965	Texas Christian University	Fort Worth, Texas	Active	
**Beta Lambda**	1966	Illinois State University	Normal, Illinois	Active	
**Beta Mu**	1967	University of Louisiana at Lafayette	Lafayette, Louisiana	Active	
**Beta Nu**	1968	Northeastern University	Boston, Massachusetts	Active	
**Beta Xi**	1969	University of Tennessee	Knoxville, Tennessee	Active	
**Beta Omicron**	1969	University of Colorado Denver	Denver, Colorado	Active	
**Beta Pi**	1970	Eastern Illinois University	Charleston, Illinois	Active	
**Beta Rho**	1970	Texas A&M University	College Station, Texas	Active	
**Beta Sigma**	1971	Central Washington University	Ellensburg, Washington	Active	
**Beta Tau**	1973	University of South Florida	Tampa, Florida	Active	
**Beta Upsilon**	1974	University of Texas at San Antonio	San Antonio, Texas	Active	
**Beta Phi**	1975	University of Texas at Arlington	Arlington, Texas	Active	
**Beta Chi**	1975	Michigan Technological University	Houghton, Michigan	Active	
**Beta Psi**	1976	Eastern Kentucky University	Richmond, Kentucky	Active	
**Beta Omega**	1976	Wayne State University	Detroit, Michigan	Active	
**Gamma Alpha**	1976	Southern University	Baton Rouge, Louisiana	Active	(Note: This chapter is at the historically Black university, not to be confused with Southern University College, Texas Southern University, or Sewanee: The University of the South.)
**Gamma Beta**	1978	Creighton University	Omaha, Nebraska	Active	
**Gamma Gamma**	1978	Virginia Commonwealth University	Richmond, Virginia	Active	
**Gamma Delta**	1984	University of California, Davis	Davis, California	Active	
**Gamma Epsilon**	1985	Eastern Washington University	Cheney, Washington	Active	
Gamma Zeta				Unassigned	
**Gamma Eta**	1988	Worcester Polytechnic Institute	Worcester, Massachusetts	Active	
**Gamma Theta**	1990	University of Alabama at Birmingham	Birmingham, Alabama	Active	
**Gamma Iota**	1994	Missouri University of Science and Technology	Rolla, Missouri	Active	
Gamma Kappa				Unassigned	
**Gamma Lambda**	1996	Bowie State University	Bowie, Maryland	Active	
**Gamma Mu**	1997	University of New England	Biddeford, Maine	Active	
**Gamma Nu**	1997	Ohio Wesleyan University	Delaware, Ohio	Active	
**Gamma Xi**	1999	Minot State University	Minot, North Dakota	Active	
**Gamma Omicron**	2002	University of West Florida	Pensacola, Florida	Active	
Gamma Pi				Unassigned	
**Gamma Rho**	2004	Quinnipiac University	Hamden, Connecticut	Active	
**Gamma Sigma**	2007	Siena College	Loudonville, New York	Active	
**Gamma Tau**	2008	California State University, Dominguez Hills	Carson, California	Active	
**Gamma Upsilon**	2009	Endicott College	Beverly, Massachusetts	Active	
**Gamma Phi**	2012	University of Pennsylvania	Philadelphia, Pennsylvania	Active	
**Gamma Chi**	2012	University of South Carolina Beaufort	Beaufort and Lowcountry region, South Carolina	Active	
**Gamma Psi**	2013	St. John's University (New York City)	New York City, New York	Active	(Note: There are several St. John's Universities; this chapter, is in New York City.)
**Gamma Omega**	2015	University of Redlands	Redlands, California	Active	
