= Tom Wilson (1910s catcher) =

American baseball player

- Catcher
- Born: June 3, 1890; Fleming, Kansas, U.S.
- Died: March 7, 1953 (aged 62); San Pedro, California, U.S.
- Batted: Both Threw: Right

MLB debut
- September 8, 1914, for the Washington Senators

Last MLB appearance
- September 8, 1914, for the Washington Senators

MLB statistics
- Batting average: .000
- At bats: 1
- Stats at Baseball Reference

Teams
- Washington Senators (1914)

Thomas G. Wilson (June 3, 1890 – March 7, 1953), nicknamed "Slats", was an American catcher in Major League Baseball who appeared in one game for the Washington Senators in its 1914 season.
