= John Daley (baseball) =

American baseball player (1887-1988)

- Shortstop
- Born: May 25, 1887; Du Bois, Pennsylvania, U.S.
- Died: August 8, 1988 (aged 101); Mansfield, Ohio, U.S.
- Batted: Right Threw: Right

MLB debut
- July 19, 1912, for the St. Louis Browns

Last MLB appearance
- August 20, 1912, for the St. Louis Browns

MLB statistics
- Batting average: .173
- Home runs: 1
- Runs batted in: 3
- Stats at Baseball Reference

Teams
- St. Louis Browns (1912)

John Daley (May 25, 1887 – August 31, 1988) was an American Major League Baseball shortstop who played with the St. Louis Browns in 1912. At the time of his death, he was the oldest living former major league player.

== See also ==
- List of centenarians (Major League Baseball players)

Records
Preceded by Carl Manda	Oldest recognized verified living baseball player March 9, 1983 – August 31, 1988	Succeeded by Bill Otis
