= Fleming, Kansas =

Unincorporated community in Crawford County, Kansas

Coordinates: 37°22′05″N 94°46′59″W

Fleming is an unincorporated community in Crawford County, Kansas, United States.

== History ==
A post office was opened in Fleming in 1892, and remained in operation until it was discontinued in 1908.

== Notable people ==
The professional baseball player Tom Wilson was born in Fleming in 1890.
