= Matt Zeiser =

American baseball player (1888–1942)

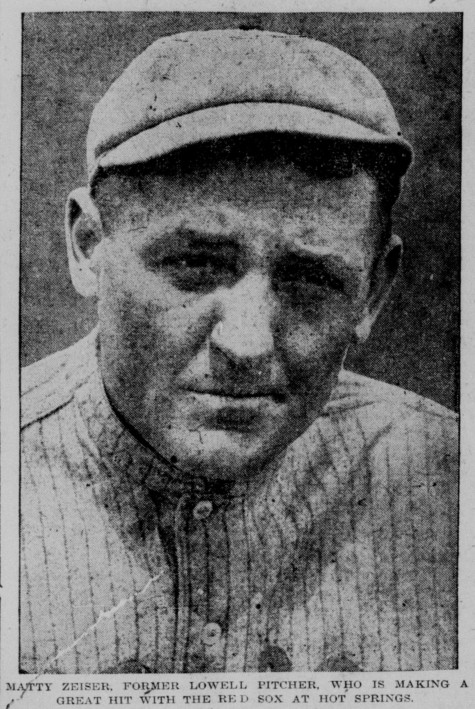
- Pitcher
- Born: September 25, 1888; Chicago, Illinois, U.S.
- Died: June 10, 1942 (aged 53); Chicago, Illinois, U.S.
- Batted: Right Threw: Right

MLB debut
- April 27, 1914, for the Boston Red Sox

Last MLB appearance
- May 11, 1914, for the Boston Red Sox

MLB statistics
- Win–loss record: 0-0
- Strikeouts: 0
- Earned run average: 1.80
- Stats at Baseball Reference

Teams
- Boston Red Sox (1914)

Mathias John Zeiser (sometimes spelled Zieser) (September 25, 1888 – June 10, 1942) was an American professional baseball pitcher. He appeared in two games in Major League Baseball for the Boston Red Sox during the 1914 season, both as a relief pitcher. Zeiser batted and threw right-handed. He was born and died in Chicago, Illinois.

In a two-game career, Zeiser posted a 1.80 earned run average with eight walks in 10 innings pitched.
