= George F. Wilson =

American baseball player (1889–1967)

Squanto Wilson
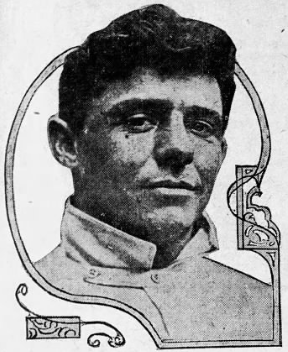
- Wilson, c. 1914
- Catcher
- Born: March 29, 1889; Old Town, Maine, U.S.
- Died: March 26, 1967 (aged 77); Winthrop, Maine, U.S.
- Batted: Both Threw: Right

MLB debut
- October 2, 1911, for the Detroit Tigers

Last MLB appearance
- April 22, 1914, for the Boston Red Sox

MLB statistics
- Games played: 6
- Batting average: .188 (3-for-16)
- Runs scored: 2
- Stats at Baseball Reference

Teams
- Detroit Tigers (1911); Boston Red Sox (1914)

George Francis "Squanto" Wilson (March 29, 1889 – March 26, 1967) was an American professional baseball player. He played six games in Major League Baseball, primarily as a catcher. He batted .188 in five games for the Detroit Tigers in 1911, and appeared in one game for the Boston Red Sox in 1914 as a pinch runner. In 1923, he served as manager of the Hanover Rebels in the Blue Ridge League.

The reason for Wilson's nickname is unknown, but he was raised in New England, and "Squanto" was a Native American who helped the English colonists in Massachusetts develop agricultural techniques and served as an interpreter between the colonists and the Wampanoag.

Wilson graduated from Bowdoin College of Brunswick, Maine, in 1912, and went on to become one of only seven Bowdoin alumni who played in the major leagues during the 20th century. After his baseball career, Wilson was a high school principal in Winthrop, Maine, and later started a variety store chain. He was married and had a daughter. He died in Maine in March 1967.
