= Ed Kelly (baseball) =

American baseball player (1888–1928)

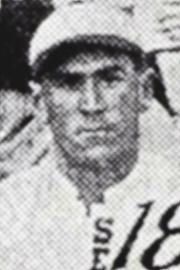
- Pitcher
- Born: December 10, 1888; Pawtucket, Rhode Island
- Died: November 4, 1928 (aged 39); Red Lodge, Montana
- Batted: Right Threw: Right

MLB debut
- April 14, 1914, for the Boston Red Sox

Last MLB appearance
- April 22, 1914, for the Boston Red Sox

MLB statistics
- Won-Loss Record: 0-0
- Earned run average: 0.00
- Strikeouts: 4
- Stats at Baseball Reference

Teams
- Boston Red Sox (1914)

Edward Leo Kelly (December 10, 1888 – November 4, 1928) was an American right-handed pitcher in Major League Baseball who pitched three games, all in relief, for the Boston Red Sox in 1914. Kelly pitched a total of two and one-thirds innings for the Red Sox, retiring nine of eleven total batters faced and allowing one unearned run. Kelly died in Red Lodge, Montana at the age of 39.

== Life and career ==
Kelly grew up in Pawtucket, Rhode Island, with his seven siblings, all brothers. In 1915 at age 26, he married Margaret K. Schuster in Spokane, Washington. Subsequently, they lived in Montana and Wyoming where their five children were born. In 1928 at age 39, Kelly died from general peritonitis caused by a ruptured ulcer, in Red Lodge, Montana.

During his professional baseball career, Kelly pitched in the minor leagues for the Seattle Giants in the Northwest League, before briefly pitching in the MLB American League for the Boston Red Sox in 1914 for three games. He returned to the minor league circuit for a year, pitching again for the Seattle Giants and also the Spokane Indians, ending with a lifetime 24–17 record having played in 54 games.
