= Nixey Callahan =

American baseball player (1874–1934)

Jimmy Callahan
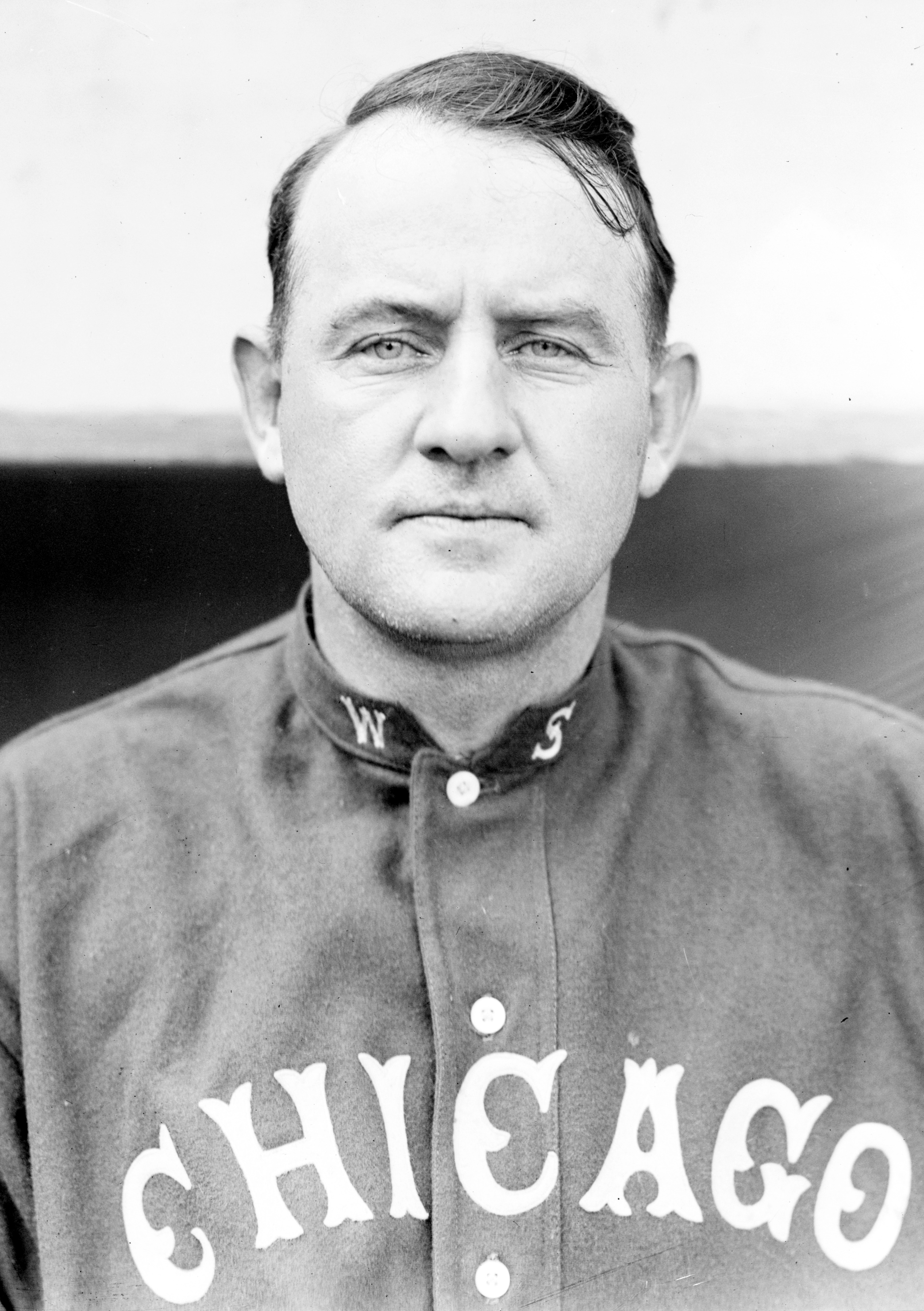
- Pitcher / Left fielder
- Born: March 18, 1874; Fitchburg, Massachusetts, U.S.
- Died: October 4, 1934 (aged 60); Boston, Massachusetts, U.S.
- Batted: Right Threw: Right

MLB debut
- May 12, 1894, for the Philadelphia Phillies

Last MLB appearance
- July 29, 1913, for the Chicago White Sox

MLB statistics
- Batting average: .273
- Home runs: 11
- Runs batted in: 394
- Win–loss record: 99–73
- Earned run average: 3.39
- Strikeouts: 445
- Stats at Baseball Reference
- Managerial record at Baseball Reference

Teams
- As player: Philadelphia Phillies (1894); Chicago Colts / Orphans (1897–1900); Chicago White Sox (1901–1905, 1911–1913); As manager: Chicago White Sox (1903–1904, 1911–1913); Pittsburgh Pirates (1916–1917)

Career highlights and awards
- Pitched a no-hitter on September 20, 1902

James Joseph Callahan (March 18, 1874 – October 4, 1934) was an American pitcher and left fielder in Major League Baseball (MLB) for the Philadelphia Phillies, Chicago Colts/Orphans, and Chicago White Sox. He also managed the White Sox, as well as the Pittsburgh Pirates. In 1902, he pitched the first no-hitter in American League history.

Though best known today by his childhood nickname "Nixey", in reality, he was seldom ever referred to by that name in contemporary sources during his playing days, as he instead preferred to go by Jimmy (or James) Callahan.

== Early life ==
Callahan was born in Fitchburg, Massachusetts on March 18, 1874. He played amateur baseball throughout Massachusetts.

== Professional baseball ==
=== As a player ===
Callahan made his debut for the 1894 Philadelphia Phillies, the National League team run by Arthur Irwin. Callahan pitched in nine games that year, giving up more than an earned run per inning, so he was sent to the minor leagues for the 1895 season. He came back up to the major leagues in 1897 with the Chicago Cubs, where he stayed for four seasons.

On September 20, 1902, Callahan pitched the first no-hitter in American League history. Remarkably, only two years earlier, in the other extreme of his career, he had given up 48 hits in two consecutive starts in 1900, yielding 23 on September 11 and 25 in the game before.

Callahan is also the only pitcher to have collected five hits in a game three times: June 29, 1897; May 18, 1902; and May 18, 1903.

Callahan finished his major league career with 901 hits and 99 wins. Since then, no player has matched both these numbers, although Babe Ruth came close. Three nineteenth-century pitcher/infielders beat these numbers: John Montgomery Ward, Kid Gleason and Dave Foutz.

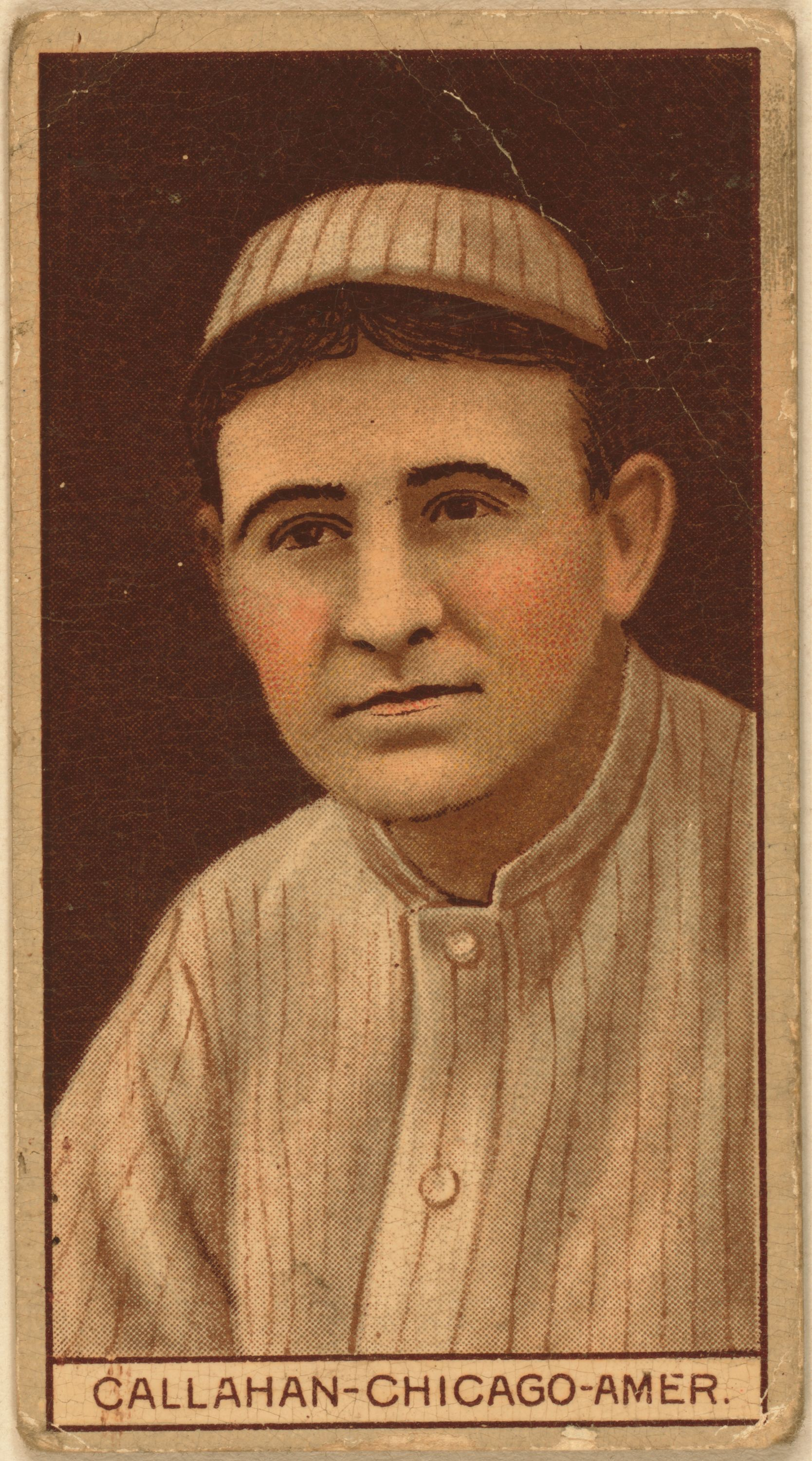
1912 American Tobacco Company baseball card

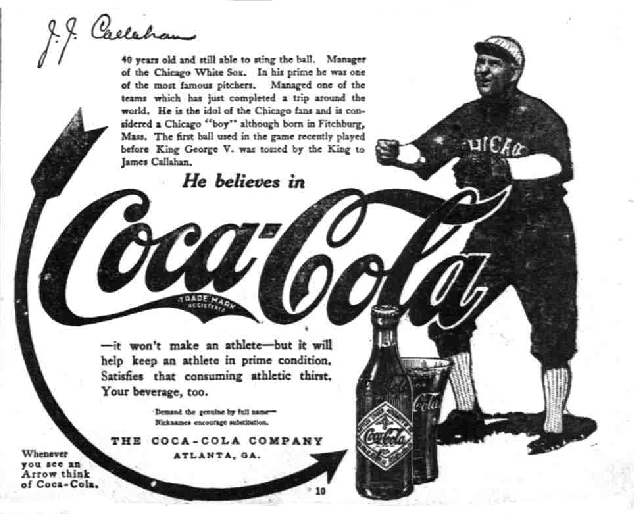
Coca-Cola ad from 1914 with J.J. Callahan

=== As a manager ===
Callahan managed the Chicago White Sox on two separate occasions and also managed the Pittsburgh Pirates.

Team	Year	Regular season					Postseason			
Team	Year	Games	Won	Lost	Win %	Finish	Won	Lost	Win %	Result
CWS	1903	137	60	77	.438	7th in AL	–	–	–	–
CWS	1904	41	23	18	.561	fired*	–	–	–	–
CWS	1912	154	78	76	.506	4th in AL	–	–	–	–
CWS	1913	152	78	74	.513	5th in AL	–	–	–	–
CWS	1914	154	70	84	.455	7th in AL	–	–	–	–
CWS total		638	309	329	.484		0	0	–	
PIT	1916	154	65	89	.422	6th in NL	–	–	–	–
PIT	1917	60	20	40	.333	fired	–	–	–	–
PIT total		214	85	129	.397		0	0	–	
Total		852	394	458	.462		0	0	–	

* Callahan was "asked" to step down as manager, he remained as a player only.

=== As an owner ===
Callahan took a five-year break from playing in the American League to run his own semi-pro team, "Callahan's Logan Squares". He said that he did this for financial reasons, but he returned when his team's attendances fell.

== Later life ==
Callahan died at age 60 in Boston on October 4, 1934.

== See also ==
- List of Major League Baseball no-hitters
- List of Major League Baseball player-managers

Awards and achievements
Preceded by Christy Mathewson	No-hitter pitcher September 20, 1902	Succeeded by Chick Fraser
