= Tim Bowden (baseball) =

American baseball player and manager

- Bowden in 1914
- Outfielder
- Born: August 15, 1891; McDonough, Georgia, U.S.
- Died: October 25, 1949 (aged 58); Decatur, Georgia, U.S.
- Batted: Left Threw: Right

MLB debut
- September 17, 1914, for the St. Louis Browns

Last MLB appearance
- September 27, 1914, for the St. Louis Browns

MLB statistics
- Games played: 7
- At bats: 9
- Hits: 2
- Stats at Baseball Reference

Teams
- St. Louis Browns (1914)

David Timon Bowden (August 15, 1891 – October 25, 1949) was an American outfielder in Major League Baseball for the St. Louis Browns of the American League. He played in 7 games during the 1914 season. He attended the University of Georgia prior to his professional debut.

In 1916 he managed the Montgomery Rebels in the South Atlantic League and in 1920 the Rome team in the Georgia State League. On October 25, 1949, Bowden committed suicide by shooting himself with a pistol in his home in Decatur, Georgia.

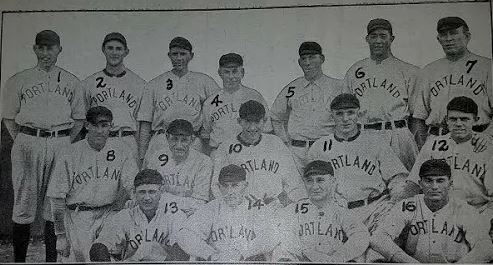
Bowden (11) with the Portland Duffs in 1915
