= Delos Brown =

American baseball player (1892–1964)

- Pinch hitter
- Born: October 4, 1892; Anna, Illinois, U.S.
- Died: December 21, 1964 (aged 72); Carbondale, Illinois, U.S.
- Batted: Right Threw: Right

MLB debut
- June 12, 1914, for the Chicago White Sox

Last MLB appearance
- June 12, 1914, for the Chicago White Sox

MLB statistics
- Games played: 1
- At bats: 1
- Hits: 0
- Stats at Baseball Reference

Teams
- Chicago White Sox (1914)

Delos Hight Brown (October 4, 1892 – December 21, 1964) was an American Major League Baseball player for the Chicago White Sox. He was born in Anna, Illinois, and attended Millikin University. In 1914, he became captain of the Millikin baseball team and led them to a conference championship. He was then signed by the White Sox.

Brown appeared in one major league game, on June 12, 1914. He was a pinch hitter and struck out in his only at bat. Afterwards, he played the rest of the season for the Decatur Commodores of the Illinois–Indiana–Iowa League and batted .192 in 63 games. His organized baseball career ended the following season.

Brown died in Carbondale, Illinois, at the age of 72.
