= Charlie Kavanagh =

American baseball player (1891–1973)

- Pinch hitter
- Born: June 9, 1891; Chicago
- Died: September 6, 1973 (aged 82); Reedsburg, Wisconsin
- Batted: Right Threw: Right

MLB debut
- June 11, 1914, for the Chicago White Sox

Last MLB appearance
- June 28, 1914, for the Chicago White Sox

MLB statistics
- Batting average: .200
- Hits: 1
- Strikeouts: 2
- Stats at Baseball Reference

Teams
- Chicago White Sox (1914)

Charles Hugh Kavanagh (June 9, 1891 – September 6, 1973) was a professional baseball player who appeared in six games with the 1914 Chicago White Sox. Kavanagh made six plate appearances, struck out twice, and got one hit. In those games, Kavanagh was used as a pinch hitter, and never played defensively. He batted and threw right-handed. During his playing career, Kavanagh stood at 5 feet 9 inches (175 cm) and weighed in at 160 pounds (73 kg). After his baseball career, Kavanagh worked as a clerk.

== Biography ==
Charlie Kavanagh was born on June 9, 1891, in Chicago to parents from Illinois. In 1914, the Chicago White Sox signed Kavanagh, who never played in the minor leagues, which is rare in professional baseball. Kavanagh made his Major League Baseball (MLB) debut on June 11, 1914. During his time with the White Sox, Kavanagh played six games. In those games, he made six plate appearances where he struck out twice, got one hit, and was hit by a pitch. His last MLB appearance came on June 28, 1914. His nickname while playing was "Silk".

By 1920, Kavanagh was living with his in-laws in Chicago with his wife, Katherine. He worked as a clerk in a local factory that year. In 1942, he was working for the Cook County, Illinois treasurer's office. On September 6, 1973, in Reedsburg, Wisconsin, Kavanagh died. He was buried at Calvary Cemetery in Reedsburg.
