= Bobby Messenger =

American baseball player (1884–1951)

- Outfielder
- Born: March 19, 1884; Bangor, Maine, U.S.
- Died: July 10, 1951 (aged 67); Bath, Maine, U.S.
- Batted: Both Threw: Right

MLB debut
- August 30, 1909, for the Chicago White Sox

Last MLB appearance
- May 5, 1914, for the St. Louis Browns

MLB statistics
- Batting average: .172
- Home runs: 0
- Runs batted in: 4
- Stats at Baseball Reference

Teams
- Chicago White Sox (1909–1911); St. Louis Browns (1914)

Charles Walter "Bobby" Messenger (March 19, 1884 – July 10, 1951) was an American professional baseball player.

Messenger was born in Bangor, Maine and was a 1908 graduate of Bates College where he played for the Bates team. After graduation he was a professional outfielder for parts of four seasons (1909–11, 1914) with the Chicago White Sox and St. Louis Browns. For his career, he compiled a .172 batting average in 157 at-bats, with four runs batted in.

After his baseball career, he coached baseball and football at Edward Little High School in Auburn, Maine and served for more than a decade as a deputy sheriff. In 1936, he was elected sheriff of Sagadahoc County.

He died in Bath, Maine at the age of 67.
