= Doug Neff =

American baseball player (1891-1932)

- Infielder
- Born: October 8, 1891; Harrisonburg, Virginia, US
- Died: May 23, 1932 (aged 40); Cape Charles, Virginia, US
- Batted: Right Threw: Right

MLB debut
- June 26, 1914, for the Washington Senators

Last MLB appearance
- October 6, 1915, for the Washington Senators

MLB statistics
- Batting average: .161
- Home runs: 0
- Runs batted in: 4
- Stats at Baseball Reference

Teams
- Washington Senators (1914–1915)

Douglas Williams Neff (October 8, 1891 – May 23, 1932) was a Major League Baseball infielder who played for the Washington Senators in 1914 and 1915. He is buried at the University of Virginia cemetery.

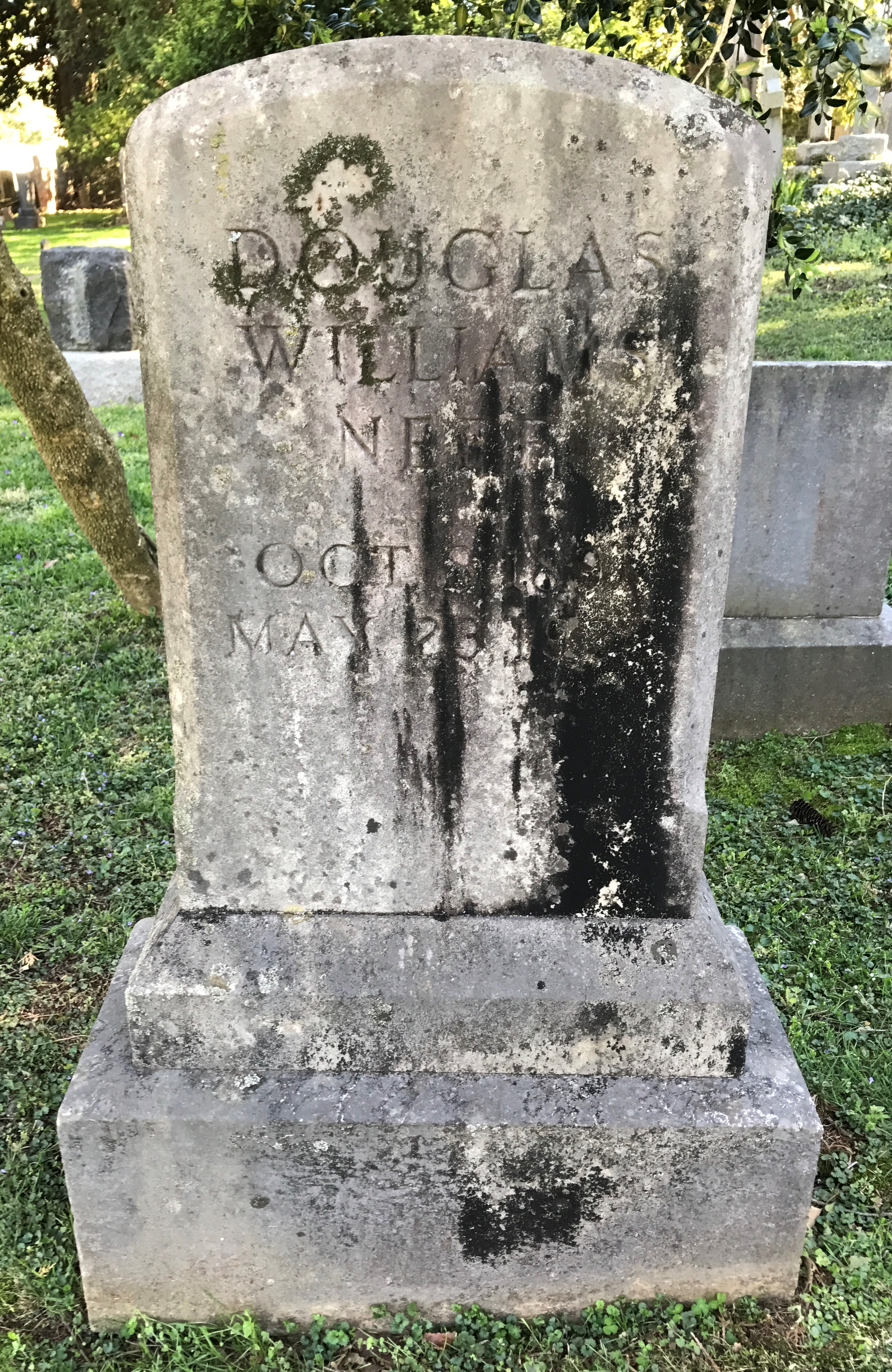
Neff's gravestone at the University of Virginia Cemetery in Charlottesville, Virginia.
