= John Leary (baseball) =

American baseball player (1891-1961)

- First baseman / Catcher
- Born: May 2, 1891; Waltham, Massachusetts, U.S.
- Died: August 18, 1961 (aged 70); Waltham, Massachusetts, U.S.
- Batted: Right Threw: Right

MLB debut
- April 14, 1914, for the St. Louis Browns

Last MLB appearance
- September 27, 1915, for the St. Louis Browns

MLB statistics
- Batting average: .258
- Home runs: 0
- Runs batted in: 60
- Stats at Baseball Reference

Teams
- St. Louis Browns (1914–1915)

John Louis Leary (May 2, 1891 – August 18, 1961) was an American Major League Baseball first baseman and catcher who played with the St. Louis Browns in 1914 and 1915.

After his professional baseball career, he returned to coach at his alma mater Waltham High School. From 1920 to 1947 he coached football, and from 1948 until his retirement in 1959 he was athletic director. The school's Leary Field is named after him.
