= Summerfield, Illinois =

Summerfield
- Village
- Location of Summerfield in Clair County, Illinois.
- Coordinates: 38°35′44″N 89°45′09″W
- Country: United States
- State: Illinois
- County: St. Clair

Area
  - Total: 0.49 sq mi (1.28 km^{2})
  - Land: 0.49 sq mi (1.28 km^{2})
  - Water: 0 sq mi (0.00 km^{2})
- Elevation: 476 ft (145 m)

Population (2020)
  - Total: 347
  - Density: 700.6/sq mi (270.51/km^{2})
- Time zone: UTC-6 (CST)
  - Summer (DST): UTC-5 (CDT)
- ZIP code: 62289
- Area code: 618
- FIPS code: 17-73547
- GNIS feature ID: 2399929

Summerfield is a village in St. Clair County, Illinois, United States. As of the 2020 census, Summerfield had a population of 347.

== Geography ==
According to the 2010 census, Summerfield has a total area of 0.431 square miles (1.12 km^{2}), of which 0.43 square miles (1.11 km^{2}) (or 99.77%) is land and 0.001 square miles (0.00 km^{2}) (or 0.23%) is water.

== Demographics ==
Historical population
Census	Pop.	Note	%±
1870	770		—
1880	640		−16.9%
1890	557		−13.0%
1900	360		−35.4%
1910	337		−6.4%
1920	277		−17.8%
1930	279		0.7%
1940	283		1.4%
1950	378		33.6%
1960	353		−6.6%
1970	443		25.5%
1980	487		9.9%
1990	509		4.5%
2000	472		−7.3%
2010	451		−4.4%
2020	347		−23.1%
U.S. Decennial Census

As of the census of 2010, there were 451 people, 161 households, and 123 families residing in the village. The population density was 1,122.6 inhabitants per square mile (433.4/km^{2}). There were 180 housing units at an average density of 428.1 per square mile (165.3/km^{2}). The racial makeup of the village was 96.61% White, 1.27% African American, 0.85% Native American, 0.21% Asian, 0.85% from other races, and 0.21% from two or more races. Hispanic or Latino of any race were 2.12% of the population.

There were 161 households, out of which 36.0% had children under the age of 18 living with them, 60.2% were married couples living together, 11.8% had a female householder with no husband present, and 23.6% were non-families. 17.4% of all households were made up of individuals, and 6.8% had someone living alone who was 65 years of age or older. The average household size was 2.93 and the average family size was 3.20.

In the village, the population was spread out, with 32.2% under the age of 18, 6.8% from 18 to 24, 30.3% from 25 to 44, 23.1% from 45 to 64, and 7.6% who were 65 years of age or older. The median age was 33 years. For every 100 females, there were 109.8 males. For every 100 females age 18 and over, there were 105.1 males.

The median income for a household in the village was $42,031, and the median income for a family was $42,500. Males had a median income of $27,813 versus $18,472 for females. The per capita income for the village was $13,283. About 5.8% of families and 6.7% of the population were below the poverty line, including none of those under age 18 and 22.2% of those age 65 or over.

== Notable people ==
- Friedrich Hecker, German lawyer, politician and revolutionary
- Wally Rehg, outfielder for four Major League Baseball teams, was born in Summerfield
