= Ed McCreery =

American baseball player (1889–1960)

- Pitcher
- Born: December 24, 1889; Florence, Colorado, U.S.
- Died: October 19, 1960 (aged 70); Sacramento, California, U.S.
- Batted: Right Threw: Right

MLB debut
- August 16, 1914, for the Detroit Tigers

Last MLB appearance
- August 27, 1914, for the Detroit Tigers

MLB statistics
- Win–loss record: 1–0
- Strikeouts: 4
- Earned run average: 11.25
- Stats at Baseball Reference

Teams
- Detroit Tigers (1914)

Esley Porterfield "Ed" McCreery (November 24, 1889 – October 19, 1960) was an American Major League Baseball pitcher. He appeared in three games for the Detroit Tigers in 1914.

In 1914, McCreery was pitching for the Butte Miners in Ogden, Utah where he was scouted by Tigers coach Deacon McGuire. The Tigers reportedly purchased his contract for $2,000 (equivalent to $62,800 in 2024). McCreery had earlier turned down an offer to play for the Kansas City club of the Federal League.

McCreery made his Major League debut on August 16, 1914, allowing five runs in only two innings pitched in what was described in the Detroit Evening Times as an "unsatisfactory showing." Although McCreery wrote to a friend that he was "up here in the big leagues to stay," his final big league game would come eleven days later on August 27.
