= Charlie Bold =

American baseball player (1894-1978)

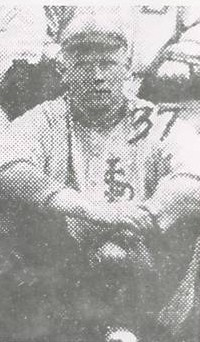
- First baseman
- Born: October 27, 1894; Karlskrona, Sweden
- Died: July 29, 1978 (aged 83); Chelsea, Massachusetts, U.S.
- Batted: Right Threw: Right

MLB debut
- August 24, 1914, for the St. Louis Browns

Last MLB appearance
- August 28, 1914, for the St. Louis Browns

MLB statistics
- Games played: 2
- At bats: 1
- Hits: 0
- Stats at Baseball Reference

Teams
- St. Louis Browns (1914)

Charles Dickens Bold (October 27, 1894 – July 29, 1978), nicknamed "Dutch", was an American professional baseball player. Bold played for the St. Louis Browns during the 1914 season. In only two career games, he had no hits in one at-bat, playing first base. He batted and threw right-handed. Bold attended Georgetown University.

He was born in Karlskrona, Sweden, and died in Chelsea, Massachusetts.
