= Ernie Manning =

American baseball player (1890–1973)

- Pitcher/Right fielder/Third baseman
- Born: October 9, 1890; Florala, Alabama, U.S.
- Died: April 28, 1973 (aged 82); Pensacola, Florida, U.S.
- Batted: Left Threw: Right

MLB debut
- May 3, 1914, for the St. Louis Browns

Last MLB appearance
- June 14, 1914, for the St. Louis Browns

MLB statistics
- Win–loss record: 0-0
- Earned run average: 3.60
- Strikeouts: 3
- At bats: 4
- Hits: 0
- Stats at Baseball Reference

Teams
- St. Louis Browns (1914)

Ernest Devon Manning (October 9, 1890 – April 28, 1973) was an American Major League Baseball pitcher, right fielder, and third baseman. Manning played in seven games for the St. Louis Browns in 1914.
