= Wally Rehg =

American baseball player (1888–1946)

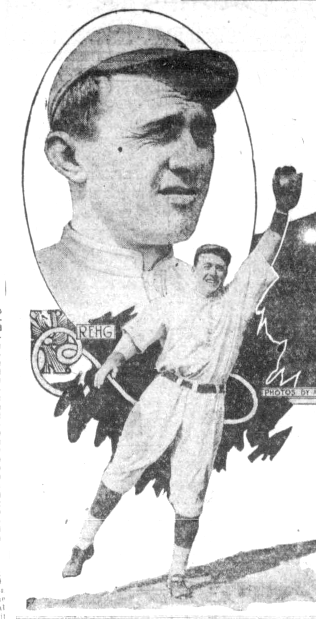
- Outfielder
- Born: August 31, 1888; Summerfield, Illinois, U.S.
- Died: April 5, 1946 (aged 57); Burbank, California, U.S.
- Batted: Right Threw: Right

MLB debut
- April 14, 1912, for the Pittsburgh Pirates

Last MLB appearance
- May 10, 1919, for the Cincinnati Reds

MLB statistics
- Batting average: .250
- Home runs: 2
- Runs batted in: 66
- Stats at Baseball Reference

Teams
- Pittsburgh Pirates (1912); Boston Red Sox (1913–1915); Boston Braves (1917–1918); Cincinnati Reds (1919)

Walter Phillip Rehg (August 31, 1888 – April 5, 1946) was a reserve outfielder in Major League Baseball, playing mostly as a right fielder for four different teams between the 1912 and 1919 seasons. Listed at 5 ft 8 in (1.73 m), 160 lb., Rehg batted and threw right-handed. He was born in Summerfield, Illinois.

Rehg entered the majors in 1912 with the Pittsburgh Pirates, playing for them one year before joining the Boston Red Sox (1913–1915), Boston Braves (1917–1918) and Cincinnati Reds (1919). He appeared in a career-high 88 games with the 1914 Red Sox, as a backup for the fabled Million-Dollar Outfield of Duffy Lewis (LF), Tris Speaker (CF) and Harry Hooper (RF). His most productive season came in 1917 with the Braves, when he posted career-numbers in batting average (.270), runs (48), RBI (31) and stolen bases (13), while appearing in 87 games. He also was a member of the 1919 National League champions Reds, although he did not play in the World Series.

In a seven-season career, Rehg was a .250 hitter (188-for-752) with two home runs and 66 RBI in 263 games, including 85 runs, 24 doubles, 11 triples and 26 stolen bases.

In between major league stops, Rehg saw regular action in the minor leagues at St. Paul and Providence, and also served in the United States Navy in 1918 during World War I. He also played in the minors from 1920 through 1930, mostly for Triple-A Indianapolis Indians, and managed the Tucson team of the Arizona State League in his last baseball season.

Besides baseball, Rehg appeared in the films Fast Company (1929), playing himself, and as an uncredited ballplayer in Alibi Ike (1935), a baseball comedy starred by Joe Brown and Olivia de Havilland.

Following his baseball career, Rehg worked as an electrician helper at Paramount Pictures Studios. He fell ill on March 28, 1946, and left the hospital on April 4. He died of a heart attack on April 5, 1946, at his home in Burbank, California.
