= Bob Clemens (baseball) =

American baseball player (1886-1964)

- Outfielder
- Born: August 9, 1886; Odessa, Missouri, U.S.
- Died: April 5, 1964 (aged 77); Marshall, Missouri, U.S.
- Batted: Right Threw: Right

MLB debut
- September 17, 1914, for the St. Louis Browns

Last MLB appearance
- October 2, 1914, for the St. Louis Browns

MLB statistics
- Batting average: .231
- Home runs: 0
- Runs batted in: 3
- Stats at Baseball Reference

Teams
- St. Louis Browns (1914)

Robert Baxter Clemens (August 9, 1886 – April 5, 1964) was an American Major League Baseball outfielder who played with the St. Louis Browns in 1914.
