= Ben Egan (baseball) =

Irish student and brother of Jack (1883–1968)

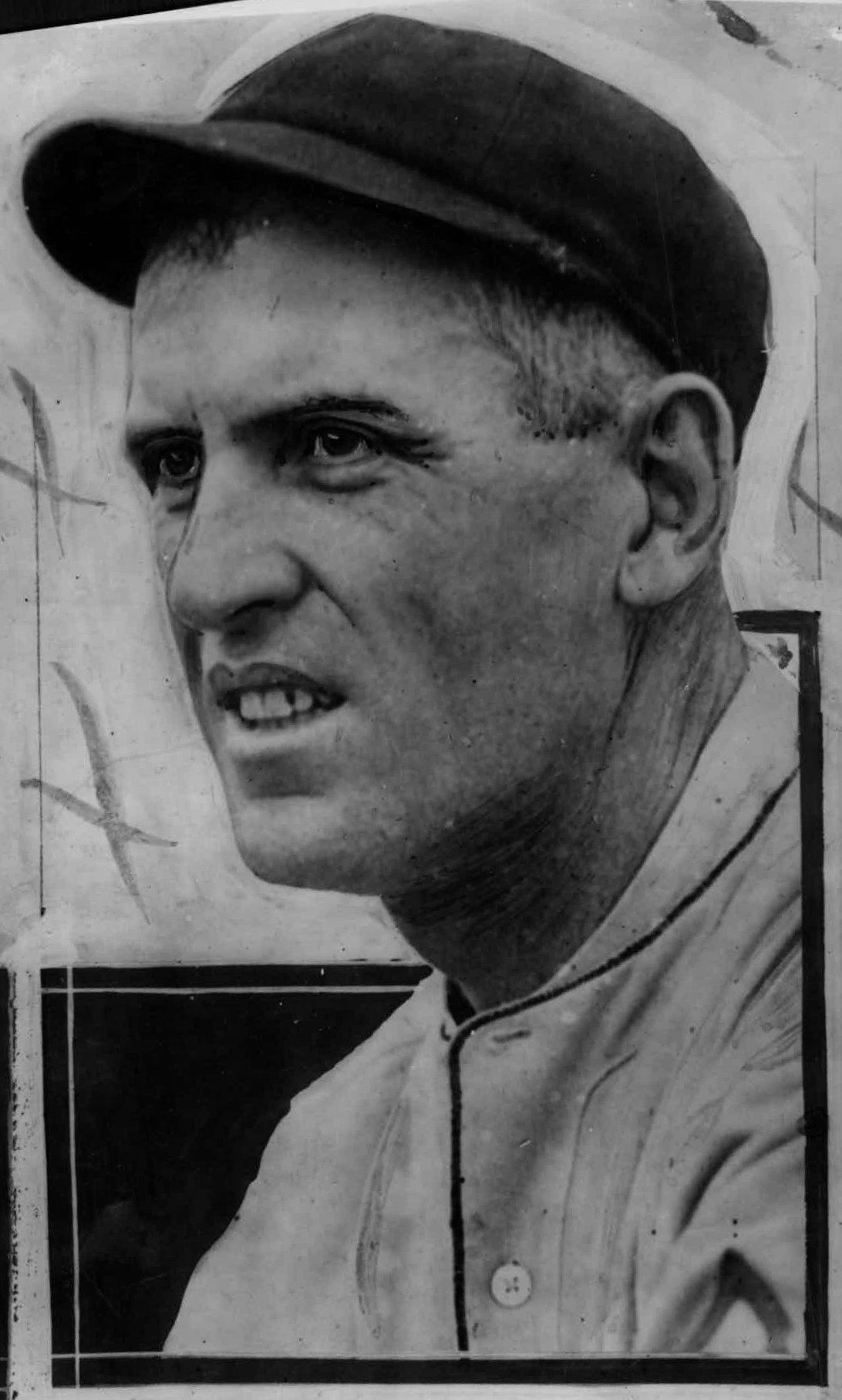
- Catcher
- Born: November 20, 1883; Augusta, New York, U.S.
- Died: February 18, 1968 (aged 84); Sherrill, New York, U.S.
- Batted: Right Threw: Right

MLB debut
- September 29, 1908, for the Philadelphia Athletics

Last MLB appearance
- September 23, 1915, for the Cleveland Indians

MLB statistics
- Batting average: .165
- Home runs: 0
- Runs batted in: 30
- Stats at Baseball Reference

Teams
- Philadelphia Athletics (1908, 1912); Cleveland Naps/Indians (1914–1915)

Arthur Augustus "Ben" Egan (November 20, 1883 – February 18, 1968) was an American professional baseball catcher for the Philadelphia Athletics and Cleveland Indians from 1908 to 1915. He was later a coach for the Washington Senators for the first half of the 1924 season, the Brooklyn Dodgers in 1925, and the Chicago White Sox in 1926. Egan was Babe Ruth’s first catcher in professional baseball and went to the majors with Ruth when the two were sold to the Boston Red Sox.
