= Jim Scoggins =

American baseball player (1891–1923)

- Pitcher
- Born: July 9, 1891; Killeen, Texas, U.S.
- Died: August 16, 1923 (aged 32); Columbia, South Carolina, U.S.
- Batted: Left Threw: Left

MLB debut
- August 26, 1913, for the Chicago White Sox

Last MLB appearance
- August 26, 1913, for the Chicago White Sox

MLB statistics
- Win–loss record: 0–1
- Innings pitched: 0.0
- Batters faced: 2
- Earned runs allowed: 0
- Stats at Baseball Reference

Teams
- Chicago White Sox (1913)

Lynn J. "Jim" Scoggins (July 9, 1891 – August 16, 1923) was an American Major League Baseball pitcher. Scoggins played for the Chicago White Sox in 1913. In one career game, he had a 0–1 record, giving up one run and one walk. He batted and threw left-handed.

Scoggins was born in Killeen, Texas and died in Columbia, South Carolina.
