= Wally Mayer =

American baseball player (1890–1951)

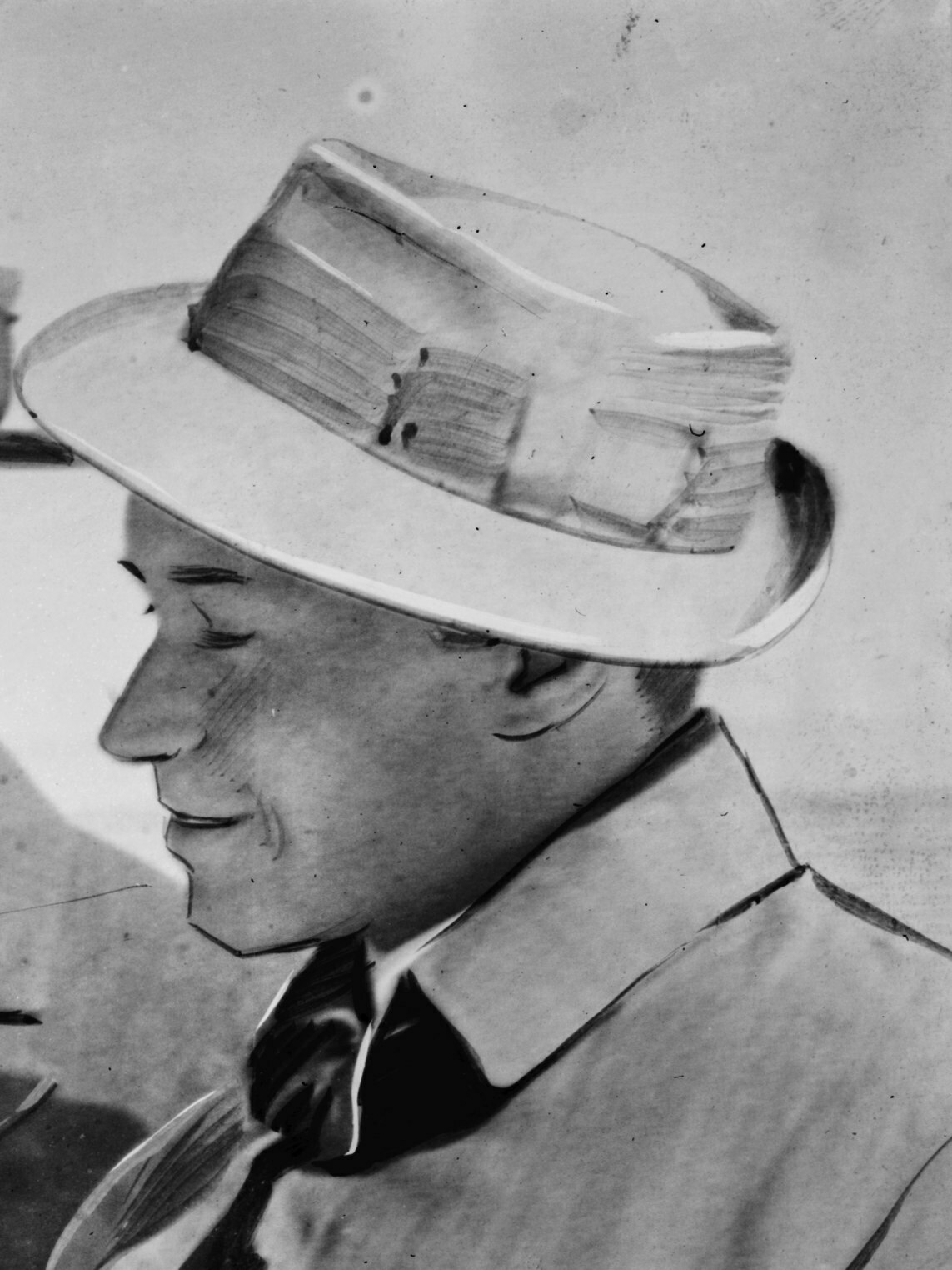
- Catcher
- Born: July 8, 1890; Cincinnati, Ohio, U.S.
- Died: November 18, 1951 (aged 61); Minnetonka, Minnesota, U.S.
- Batted: Right Threw: Right

MLB debut
- September 28, 1911, for the Chicago White Sox

Last MLB appearance
- September 2, 1919, for the St. Louis Browns

MLB statistics
- Batting average: .193
- Home runs: 0
- Runs batted in: 20
- Stats at Baseball Reference

Teams
- Chicago White Sox (1911–1912, 1914–1915); Boston Red Sox (1917–1918); St. Louis Browns (1919)

Career highlights and awards
- World Series champion (1918)

Walter A. Mayer (July 8, 1890 – November 18, 1951) was an American backup catcher in Major League Baseball who played from 1911 through 1919 for the Chicago White Sox (1911–1912, 1914–1915), Boston Red Sox (1917–1918) and St. Louis Browns (1919). Listed at 5 ft 11 in (1.80 m), 168 lb., Mayer batted and threw right-handed. He was born in Cincinnati.

In a seven-season career, Mayer was a .193 hitter (53-for-274) with 22 runs and 20 RBI in 132 games, including 14 doubles, one triple, one stolen base, and a .303 on-base percentage. He did not hit a home run. In 112 catching appearances, he committed 17 errors in 553 chances for a .968 fielding percentage.

Mayer died in Minnetonka, Minnesota at age 61.
