= Ray Demmitt =

American baseball player (1884–1956)

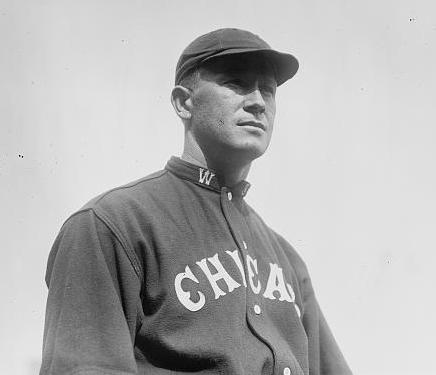
- Outfielder
- Born: February 2, 1884; Illiopolis, Illinois, U.S.
- Died: February 19, 1956 (aged 72); Glen Ellyn, Illinois, U.S.
- Batted: Left Threw: Right

MLB debut
- April 12, 1909, for the New York Highlanders

Last MLB appearance
- September 28, 1919, for the St. Louis Browns

MLB statistics
- Batting average: .257
- Home runs: 8
- Runs batted in: 165
- Stats at Baseball Reference

Teams
- New York Highlanders (1909); St. Louis Browns (1910); Detroit Tigers (1914); Chicago White Sox (1914–1915); St. Louis Browns (1917–1919)

Charles Raymond Demmitt (February 2, 1884 – February 19, 1956) was an American professional baseball player who played outfield in the Major Leagues from 1909-1919 for the New York Highlanders, St. Louis Browns, Detroit Tigers, and Chicago White Sox.

Demmitt was born in Illiopolis, Illinois and died in Glen Ellyn, Illinois. He went to college at University of Illinois at Urbana-Champaign and Rose–Hulman Institute of Technology.
