= 1914 in baseball =

The following are the baseball events of the year 1914 throughout the world.

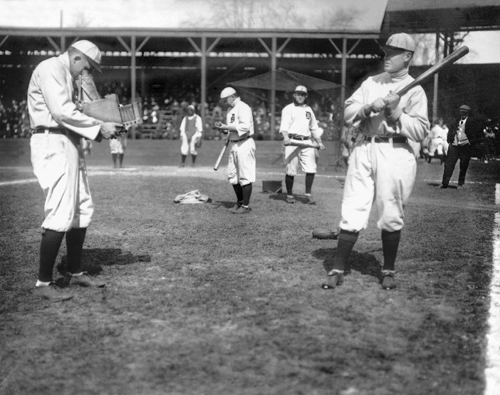
Ty Cobb and Sam Crawford, 1914

== Champions ==
- World Series: Boston Braves over Philadelphia Athletics (4–0)

== Awards and honors ==
- Chalmers Award
  - AL — Eddie Collins, Philadelphia Athletics, 2B
  - NL — Johnny Evers, Boston Braves, 2B

== Statistical leaders ==
	American League		National League		Federal League	
Stat	Player	Total	Player	Total	Player	Total
AVG	Ty Cobb (DET)	.368	Jake Daubert (BRO)	.329	Benny Kauff (IND)	.370
HR	Home Run Baker (PHA)	9	Gavvy Cravath (PHI)	19	Dutch Zwilling (CWH)	16
RBI	Sam Crawford (DET)	104	Sherry Magee (PHI)	103	Frank LaPorte (IND)	107
W	Walter Johnson (WSH)	28	Grover Alexander (PHI)	27	Claude Hendrix (CWH)	29
ERA	Dutch Leonard (BOS)	0.96	Bill Doak (STL)	1.72	Claude Hendrix (CWH)	1.69
K	Walter Johnson (WSH)	225	Grover Alexander (PHI)	214	Cy Falkenberg (IND)	236

== Major league baseball final standings ==
=== American League ===
American League
Team	W	L	Pct.	GB	Home	Road
Philadelphia Athletics	99	53	.651	—	51‍–‍24	48‍–‍29
Boston Red Sox	91	62	.595	8½	44‍–‍31	47‍–‍31
Washington Senators	81	73	.526	19	40‍–‍33	41‍–‍40
Detroit Tigers	80	73	.523	19½	42‍–‍35	38‍–‍38
St. Louis Browns	71	82	.464	28½	42‍–‍36	29‍–‍46
Chicago White Sox	70	84	.455	30	43‍–‍37	27‍–‍47
New York Yankees	70	84	.455	30	36‍–‍40	34‍–‍44
Cleveland Naps	51	102	.333	48½	32‍–‍47	19‍–‍55

Locations of teams for the 1913–1914 American League seasons
American League

=== National League ===
National League
Team	W	L	Pct.	GB	Home	Road
Boston Braves	94	59	.614	—	51‍–‍25	43‍–‍34
New York Giants	84	70	.545	10½	43‍–‍36	41‍–‍34
St. Louis Cardinals	81	72	.529	13	42‍–‍34	39‍–‍38
Chicago Cubs	78	76	.506	16½	46‍–‍30	32‍–‍46
Brooklyn Robins	75	79	.487	19½	45‍–‍34	30‍–‍45
Philadelphia Phillies	74	80	.481	20½	48‍–‍30	26‍–‍50
Pittsburgh Pirates	69	85	.448	25½	39‍–‍36	30‍–‍49
Cincinnati Reds	60	94	.390	34½	34‍–‍42	26‍–‍52

Locations of teams for the 1914 National League season
National League

=== Federal League ===
Federal League
Team	W	L	Pct.	GB	Home	Road
Indianapolis Hoosiers	88	65	.575	—	53‍–‍23	35‍–‍42
Chicago Federals	87	67	.565	1½	43‍–‍34	44‍–‍33
Baltimore Terrapins	84	70	.545	4½	53‍–‍26	31‍–‍44
Buffalo Buffeds	80	71	.530	7	47‍–‍29	33‍–‍42
Brooklyn Tip-Tops	77	77	.500	11½	47‍–‍32	30‍–‍45
Kansas City Packers	67	84	.444	20	37‍–‍36	30‍–‍48
Pittsburgh Rebels	64	86	.427	22½	37‍–‍37	27‍–‍49
St. Louis Terriers	62	89	.411	25	32‍–‍43	30‍–‍46

Locations of teams for the 1914 Federal League season
Federal League

== Events ==
=== February ===
- February 11 – The Chicago Cubs trade Johnny Evers, part of the legendary Tinkers to Evers to Chance infield, to the Boston Braves for Bill Sweeney.
- February 19 – Solly Hofman jumped from the Pittsburgh Pirates to Brooklyn Tip-Tops of the Federal League.
- February 27 – Jack Quinn, a pitcher for the Boston Braves, jumped from the National League to the Baltimore Terrapins of the Federal League.

=== April ===
- April 17 – Pitcher Red Faber makes his MLB debut for the Chicago White Sox in their 6–5 victory over the winless Cleveland Naps.
- April 21 – Future Hall of Famer Frank Chance plays his final game, entering as a defensive replacement for the New York Yankees in the bottom of the 9th inning.
- April 30 – Nick Cullop jumps from the Cleveland Naps to the Kansas City Packers.

=== May ===
- May 31 – Joe Benz pitches a no hitter in a 6–1 Chicago White Sox victory over the Cleveland Naps.

=== June ===
- June 3 – The Baltimore Terrapins trade Happy Finneran to the Brooklyn Tip-Tops in exchange for Felix Chouinard.
- June 9 – Honus Wagner of the Pittsburgh Pirates becomes the second member of the 3000 hit club.

=== July ===
- July 1 – Harry Kingman pinch-hits for the New York Yankees in their 7–4 loss to the Washington Senators, becoming the first Chinese-born major league baseball player.
- July 9 – The Boston Red Sox purchase the contracts of Ernie Shore, Ben Egan and Babe Ruth from the Baltimore Orioles of the International League for $25,000.

=== August ===
- August 27 – Fred McMullin makes his major league debut for the Detroit Tigers in their 9–2 loss to the Boston Red Sox.
- August 28 - One day after being released by the Boston Red Sox, infielder Steve Yerkes jumps to the Federal League, signing with the Pittsburgh Rebels.

=== September ===
- September 9 – In the second game of a doubleheader, George Davis of the Boston Braves pitches a no-hitter against the Philadelphia Phillies in a 7–0 win.
- September 19 – Ed Lafitte pitches a no-hitter for the Brooklyn Tip-Tops of the Federal League in a 6–2 win over the Kansas City Packers.
- September 21 – Walter Johnson of the Washington Senators has four wild pitches in an inning.
- September 27 – Nap Lajoie of the Cleveland Naps becomes the third member of the 3,000 hit club.

=== October ===
- October 13 – The Boston Braves defeat the Philadelphia Athletics 3–1 in Game 4 of the 1914 World Series to win their first World Series, four games to none, for the first four-game sweep in World Series history.
- October 18 – Pitcher Hugh Bedient of the Boston Red Sox jumps to the Buffalo Blues of the Federal League.

=== November ===
- November 16 – Eddie Plank reportedly jumps from the Philadelphia Athletics of the American League to the Federal League's Chicago Federals after Athletics owner Connie Mack instigates a fire sale, asking waivers for Plank, Jack Coombs, and Chief Bender.

=== December ===
- December 2 – Pitcher Eddie Plank officially jumps to the Federal League, signing a contract with the St. Louis Terriers.
- December 5 – Pitcher Chief Bender jumps to the Federal League, signing a contract with the Baltimore Terrapins.

== Births ==
=== January ===
- January 4 – Herman Franks
- January 5 – Joe Grace
- January 5 – Jack Salveson
- January 10 – Carrenza Howard
- January 13 – Roberto Olivo
- January 19 – Benny Culp
- January 19 – Al Piechota
- January 21 – Blix Donnelly
- January 23 – Merv Connors
- January 28 – Alf Anderson
- January 31 – Mel Mazzera
- January 31 – Charlie Wiedemeyer

=== February ===
- February 5 – John Gaddy
- February 8 – Mel Bosser
- February 8 – Bert Haas
- February 9 – Bill Veeck
- February 17 – Rod Dedeaux
- February 19 – John Bissant
- February 19 – Stan Sperry
- February 21 – Milt Gray
- February 23 – Lynn Myers
- February 23 – Pedro Pagés
- February 23 – Mike Tresh

=== March ===
- March 1 – Harry Caray
- March 4 – Art Rebel
- March 7 – Joe Gallagher
- March 12 – Otto Huber
- March 14 – Red Marion
- March 21 – Boyd Perry
- March 26 – Hal Epps

=== April ===
- April 1 – George Bradley
- April 1 – Moe Franklin
- April 6 – Dee Moore
- April 8 – Andy Karl
- April 14 – Earl Bumpus
- April 17 – Lefty Smoll
- April 27 – George Archie
- April 27 – Larry Crawford
- April 27 – Jug Thesenga
- April 29 – Marv Breuer

=== May ===
- May 4 – Harl Maggert
- May 9 – Culley Rikard
- May 10 – Russ Bauers
- May 11 – Al Williams
- May 14 – Jim Shilling
- May 14 – Albert Zachary
- May 15 – Jimmy Wasdell
- May 20 – Stan Benjamin
- May 27 – Johnny Welaj

=== June ===
- June 6 – Eddie Silber
- June 12 – Pete Naktenis
- June 14 – George Myatt
- June 16 – Johnnie Wittig
- June 22 – Jim Asbell
- June 22 – Maury Newlin
- June 24 – Hal Kelleher
- June 27 – Irv Bartling

=== July ===
- July 2 – Bob Allen
- July 3 – Buddy Rosar
- July 8 – George Fallon
- July 11 – George Binks
- July 11 – Gentry Jessup
- July 12 – Al Glossop
- July 14 – José Pérez Colmenares
- July 16 – Don Ross
- July 17 – Charlie Frye
- July 18 – Andy Gilbert
- July 18 – Ben Huffman
- July 19 – Marius Russo
- July 23 – Frank Croucher
- July 26 – Ellis Kinder
- July 30 – Steve Peek
- July 31 – Elmer Riddle

=== August ===
- August 5 – Bob Daughters
- August 5 – Bob Loane
- August 6 – Tommy Reis
- August 22 – Augie Donatelli
- August 24 – George Turbeville
- August 26 – Al Cuccinello
- August 30 – Buddy Hancken

=== September ===
- September 7 – Hermina Franks
- September 11 – Clay Smith
- September 18 – Bill Sodd
- September 23 – Mack Stewart
- September 27 – Bill Jackowski
- September 28 – Dick Midkiff
- September 29 – Johnny Johnson

=== October ===
- October 3 – Woody Wheaton
- October 4 – Bruce Sloan
- October 6 – George Washburn
- October 10 – Italo Chelini
- October 10 – Tommy Fine
- October 13 – Frankie Hayes
- October 14 – Harry Brecheen
- October 28 – Johnny Rigney
- October 30 – Lefty Wilkie

=== November ===
- November 2 – Jesse Flores
- November 2 – Tom McBride
- November 2 – Johnny Vander Meer
- November 4 – Sig Gryska
- November 4 – Les McCrabb
- November 5 – Mark Mauldin
- November 10 – Angel Fleitas
- November 12 – Emerson Dickman
- November 13 – Jack Hallett
- November 15 – Mickey Livingston
- November 15 – Maurice Van Robays
- November 19 – Eddie Morgan
- November 21 – Pinky Jorgensen
- November 21 – George Scharein
- November 22 – Alex Pitko
- November 23 – Emmett Ashford
- November 23 – Mel Preibisch
- November 25 – Joe DiMaggio
- November 25 – Gene Handley
- November 26 – Ed Weiland
- November 29 – Joe Orengo

=== December ===
- December 6 – Turkey Tyson
- December 9 – Hank Camelli
- December 11 – Bill Nicholson
- December 12 – Buzzie Bavasi
- December 14 – Rusty Peters
- December 17 – Dave Smith

== Deaths ==
=== January–April ===
- January 11 – Walt Goldsby, 52, outfielder who hit .236 for five teams in two different leagues between 1884 and 1888.
- January 13 – Aaron Clapp, 57, first baseman for the 1879 Troy Trojans of the National League.
- January 20 – Pat Lyons, 53, Canadian second baseman who played for the Cleveland Spiders of the National League in 1890.
- February 1 – Sam Weaver, 58, pitcher who posted a 68–80 record and a 3.21 ERA with five teams in four different leagues from 1875 to 1886.
- February 9 – Buster Brown, 32, National League pitcher who had a 51–103 record and a 3.21 ERA for the St. Louis Cardinals (1905–'07), Philadelphia Phillies (1907–'09) and Boston Doves/Braves (1909–13).
- February 9 – Jack Farrell, 56, second baseman for 11 seasons (1879–1889), who played bulk of his career with the Providence Grays.
- February 21 – Farmer Vaughn, 49, catcher who hit .274 with 21 home runs and 525 RBI in 925 games for five teams from 1886 to 1899.
- February 23 – Nat Jewett, 69, catcher for the 1872 Brooklyn Eckfords of the National Association.
- February 28 – Art Sladen, 53, outfielder for the Boston Reds of the Union Association in 1884.
- March 24 – Jack Brennan, 50, catcher/infielder who played from 1884 to 1890 with four teams in four different leagues.
- April 1 – Rube Waddell, 37, pitcher for the Philadelphia Athletics who led AL in strikeouts six consecutive years, including modern record of 349 in 1904; four-time 20-game winner led AL in ERA twice with career 2.16 mark, best ever by left-hander with 1500 innings; 2316 strikeouts ranked third in history upon retirement, 50 shutouts ranked fifth; first major leaguer to strike out a side on nine pitches. According to Lee Allen, in The American League Story (1961), there were those who considered it appropriate that Waddell should die on April Fool's Day.
- April 7 – Charlie Ganzel, 51, catcher for four different teams during fourteen seasons, and a member of the 1887 Detroit Wolverines National League champion team that won the first ever World Series, beating the St. Louis Browns ten games to five.
- April 16 – Podge Weihe, 51, American Association outfielder who hit .254 in two seasons with the Indianapolis Hoosiers (1883) and Cincinnati RedStockings (1884).
- April 27 – Herb Worth, 66, outfielder for the 1872 Brooklyn Atlantics of the National Association .

=== May–August ===
- May 8 – George Fox, 45, first baseman for the Louisville Colonels of the American Association (1891) and the Pittsburgh Pirates of the National League (1899).
- May 20 – Chub Collins, 56, shortstop for the National League Buffalo Bisons in 1884, on a talented team featuring the all-star infield known as the "Big Four": Dan Brouthers, Hardy Richardson, Deacon White and later Jack Rowe.
- May 26 – Jumbo Latham, 61, first baseman who hit .247 in 334 games for five different teams from 1875 to 1884, while managing two of them (1875, 1882).
- June 16 – Bert Dorr, 52, pitcher for the 1882 St. Louis Browns.
- July 5 – Wee Willie Mills, 36, pitcher for the National League New York Giants in 1901.
- July 9 – Ossee Schreckengost, 39, catcher for eleven seasons, most notably with the Philadelphia Athletics from 1902 to 1908, who pioneered one-handed style and batted .300 twice.
- August 1 – Gid Gardner, 55, outfielder/pitcher from 1879 to 1888, who hit a .233 average and had a 2–10 record for eight teams in three different leagues.
- August 1 – Con Murphy, 50, pitcher who posted a 4–13 record with the Philadelphia Quakers (1884) and Brooklyn Ward's Wonders (1890).
- August 17 – Harry Steinfeldt, 36, third baseman for the Cincinnati Reds and Chicago Cubs who led National League in hits, doubles and RBI once each, batting .300 twice, and hit .471 in the 1907 World Series to lead the Cubs to the championship.

=== September–December ===
- September 2 – Al Metcalf, 61, appeared in eight games for the 1875 New York Mutuals.
- September 9 – Willie Garoni, 37, pitcher for the 1899 New York Giants of the National League.
- September 14 – Jim McDonald, 54, third baseman who played from 1884 to 1885 for three teams in three different leagues.
- November 2 – Jack Sheridan, 52, American League umpire since the league's 1901 formation, previously in the Players' League and National League, who officiated in four of the first seven World Series, and introduced the practice of crouching behind the catcher when calling balls and strikes.
- November 9 – Danny Green, 38, outfielder for the Orphans and White Sox Chicago teams and a four-time .300 hitter who died following complications related to a beaning.
- November 10 – Jack Heinzman, 51, first baseman for the 1886 Louisville Colonels of the American Association.
- November 10 – Heinie Reitz, 47, National League second baseman for the Orioles, Senators and Pirates from 1893 to 1899, who hit .292 in 724 games and led the league with 31 triples in 1894.
- November 28 – Tug Wilson, 54, outfielder and catcher for the 1884 Brooklyn Atlantics.
- December 11 – Harry Burrell, 47, pitcher who posted a 4–2 record and a 4.81 ERA with the 1891 St. Louis Browns of the American Association.
- December 22 – Phil Powers, 60, catcher who played from 1878 to 1885 for five different teams in the National League and American Association.
- December 31 – John Farrow, 61, National Association catcher for the Elizabeth Resolutes (1873) and Brooklyn Atlantics (1874, 1884).
- December 31 – John O'Brien, 63, outfielder for the 1884 Baltimore Monumentals of the Union Association.
