= Williamsburg, Maryland =

- unincorporated community
- Interactive map of Williamsburg, Maryland
- Coordinates: 38°39′18″N 75°49′49″W
- Country: United States
- State: Maryland
- County: Dorchester
- Time zone: UTC−5 (Eastern (EST))
  - Summer (DST): UTC−4 (EDT)
- ZIP code: 21643
- Area code: 410
- GNIS feature ID: 591559

Williamsburg is an unincorporated community in Dorchester County on the Eastern Shore of the U.S. state of Maryland.

== Notable people ==
Jim Stevens, a Washington Senators baseball player in 1914, was born in Williamsburg in 1889.
