= Don Rader (baseball) =

American baseball player (1893–1983)

- Shortstop
- Born: September 5, 1893; Wolcott, Indiana, U.S.
- Died: June 26, 1983 (aged 89); Walla Walla, Washington, U.S.
- Batted: Left Threw: Right

MLB debut
- July 25, 1913, for the Chicago White Sox

Last MLB appearance
- October 1, 1921, for the Philadelphia Phillies

MLB statistics
- Batting average: .286
- Home runs: 0
- Runs batted in: 3
- Stats at Baseball Reference

Teams
- Chicago White Sox (1913); Philadelphia Phillies (1921)

Donald Russell Rader (September 5, 1893 – June 26, 1983) was an American Major League Baseball shortstop who played with the Chicago White Sox in 1913 and the Philadelphia Phillies in 1921.
