= Hank Schreiber =

American baseball player (1891–1968)

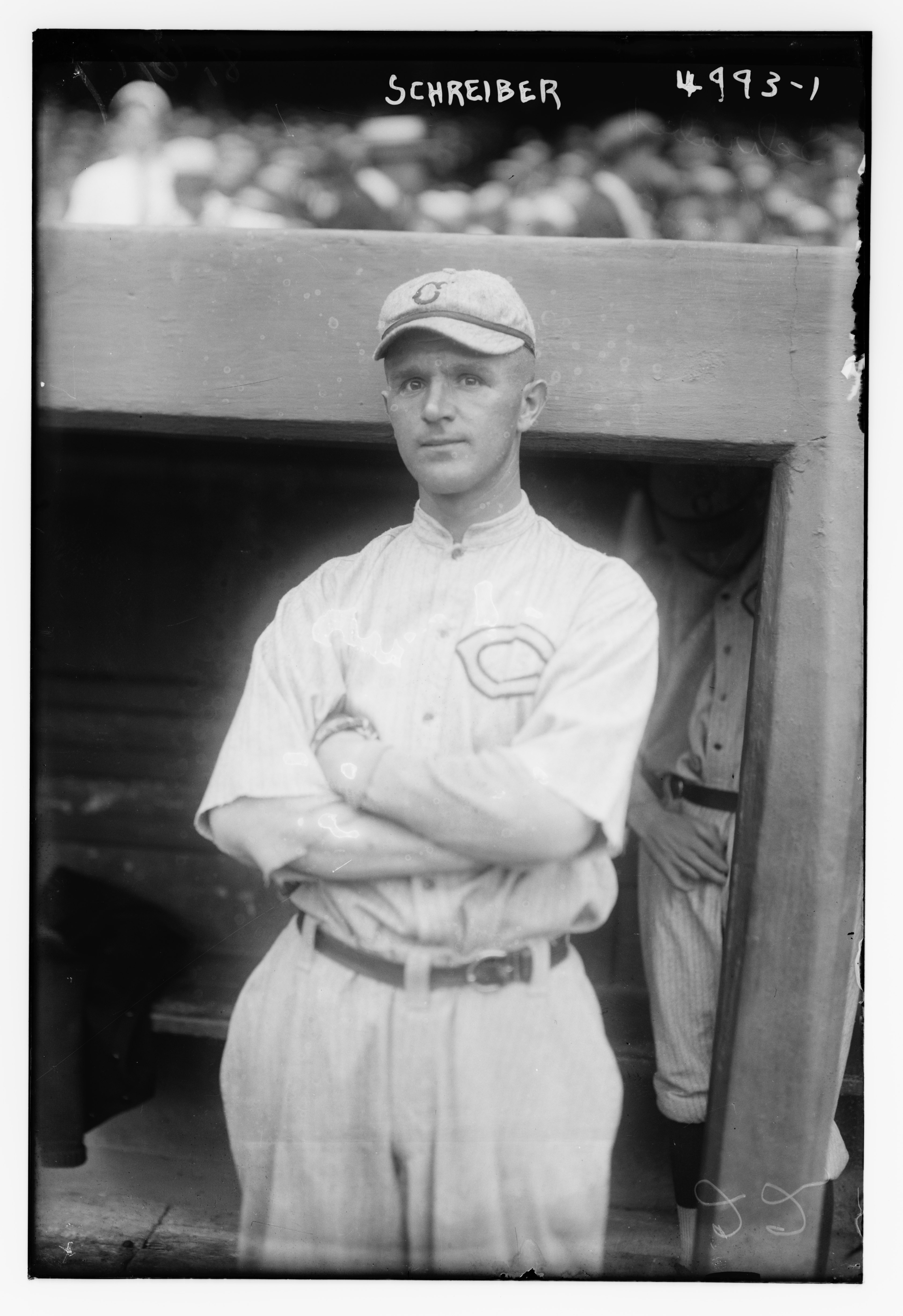
- Infielder
- Born: July 12, 1891; Cleveland, Ohio, U.S.
- Died: February 23, 1968 (aged 76); Indianapolis, Indiana, U.S.
- Batted: Right Threw: Right

MLB debut
- April 14, 1914, for the Chicago White Sox

Last MLB appearance
- August 16, 1926, for the Chicago Cubs

MLB statistics
- Batting average: .198
- Home runs: 0
- Runs batted in: 6
- Stats at Baseball Reference

Teams
- Chicago White Sox (1914); Boston Braves (1917); Cincinnati Reds (1919); New York Giants (1921); Chicago Cubs (1926)

Henry Walter Shreiber (July 12, 1891 – February 23, 1968) was an American Major League Baseball infielder. He was the only major league player to play for five major league teams in five non-consecutive years, never playing on more than one team per season, and never at any point appearing in the majors in two consecutive seasons.

He also established the record for being the player who appeared for the most major league teams without ever accumulating enough career at-bats to officially qualify as a rookie. This record was later tied by Jermaine Clark and Gustavo Molina.

The bulk of Shreiber's major league experience came with the 1919 Cincinnati Reds, where he substituted for an injured Heinie Groh at third base for most of the month of September. The Reds would win the World Series that year (over the Chicago White Sox), but Shreiber did not appear in any World Series games.
