= Jim Breton =

American baseball player (1891–1973)

- Third baseman
- Born: July 15, 1891; Chicago, Illinois, U.S.
- Died: May 30, 1973 (aged 81); Beloit, Wisconsin, U.S.
- Batted: Right Threw: Right

MLB debut
- August 25, 1913, for the Chicago White Sox

Last MLB appearance
- July 17, 1915, for the Chicago White Sox

MLB statistics
- Batting average: .199
- Home runs: 0
- Runs batted in: 27
- Stats at Baseball Reference

Teams
- Chicago White Sox (1913–1915)

John Frederick "Jim" Breton (July 15, 1891 – May 30, 1973) was an American third baseman in Major League Baseball. He played for the Chicago White Sox.
