= Joe Berger (baseball) =

American baseball player (1886–1956)

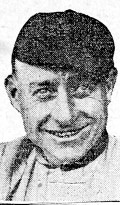
- Infielder
- Born: December 20, 1886; St. Louis, Missouri, U.S.
- Died: March 6, 1956 (aged 69); Rock Island, Illinois, U.S.
- Batted: Right Threw: Right

MLB debut
- April 11, 1913, for the Chicago White Sox

Last MLB appearance
- September 27, 1914, for the Chicago White Sox

MLB statistics
- Batting average: .191
- Home runs: 2
- Runs batted in: 23
- Stats at Baseball Reference

Teams
- Chicago White Sox (1913–1914)

Joseph August Berger (December 20, 1886 – March 6, 1956) was an American infielder in Major League Baseball. He played for the Chicago White Sox.
