= Bill Lathrop =

American baseball player (1891–1958)

- Pitcher
- Born: August 12, 1891; Hanover, Wisconsin
- Died: November 20, 1958 (aged 67); Janesville, Wisconsin
- Batted: Right Threw: Right

MLB debut
- July 29, 1913, for the Chicago White Sox

Last MLB appearance
- October 3, 1914, for the Chicago White Sox

MLB statistics
- Win–loss record: 1–3
- Earned run average: 3.06
- Strikeouts: 16
- Stats at Baseball Reference

Teams
- Chicago White Sox (1913–1914)

William George Lathrop (August 12, 1891 – November 20, 1958) was a pitcher in Major League Baseball. He played for the Chicago White Sox.
