= Joe Benz =

American baseball pitcher (1886–1957)

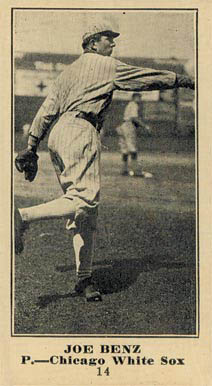
- 1916 baseball card of Benz
- Pitcher
- Born: January 21, 1886; New Alsace, Indiana, U.S.
- Died: April 22, 1957 (aged 71); Chicago, Illinois, U.S.
- Batted: Right Threw: Right

MLB debut
- August 16, 1911, for the Chicago White Sox

Last MLB appearance
- May 2, 1919, for the Chicago White Sox

MLB statistics
- Win–loss record: 77–75
- Earned run average: 2.43
- Strikeouts: 539
- Stats at Baseball Reference

Teams
- Chicago White Sox (1911–1919)

Career highlights and awards
- Pitched a no-hitter on May 31, 1914; World Series champion (1917)

Joseph Louis Benz (January 21, 1886 – April 22, 1957) was an American professional baseball pitcher. He played in the major leagues from 1911 to 1919, for the Chicago White Sox. Benz's two main pitches were the spitball and the knuckleball.

Benz pitched a no-hitter for the White Sox on May 31, 1914, against the Cleveland Naps. He was a member of the Sox teams that reached the World Series in both 1917 and 1919, but appeared in neither. Benz had a 7–3 record during the 1917 season and was 8–8 a year later, throwing 10 complete games. But he pitched in just one game during the 1919 season, and was not on the roster for the 1919 World Series, which was tainted by the Black Sox Scandal.

== Personal life ==
Benz's grave at Holy Sepulchre Cemetery

The Benz family was of German Catholic descent, Joe's grandfather having emigrated from the Grand Duchy of Baden in 1849.

After baseball, Benz was the custodian of a church and also worked for O'Hare Field. He died of a heart-related illness in 1957, and was buried at Holy Sepulchre Cemetery in Alsip, Illinois.

Preceded by Jeff Tesreau	No-hitter pitcher May 31, 1914	Succeeded by George Davis
