= 1914 Major League Baseball season =

1914 MLB season
- League: American League (AL); National League (NL); Federal League (FL)
- Sport: Baseball
- Duration: Regular season: April 14 – October 7, 1914 (AL); April 14 – October 6, 1914 (NL); April 13 – October 10, 1914 (FL); World Series (AL vs. NL): October 9–13, 1914
- Games: 154
- Teams: 24 (8 per league)

Regular Season
- Season MVP: AL: Eddie Collins (PHA); NL: Johnny Evers (BSN)
- AL champions: Philadelphia Athletics
- AL runners-up: Boston Red Sox
- NL champions: Boston Braves
- NL runners-up: New York Giants
- FL champions: Indianapolis Hoosiers
- FL runners-up: Chicago Federals

World Series
- Champions: Boston Braves (NL)
- Runners-up: Philadelphia Athletics (AL)

MLB seasons
- ← 1913 1915 →

Locations of teams for the 1913–1914 American League seasons
American League
Locations of teams for the 1914 National League season
National League
Locations of teams for the 1914 Federal League season
Federal League

The 1914 major league baseball season began on April 13, 1914, with the first game of the inaugural major league season of the Federal League (having previously existed as a minor league the year before). The league declared itself as a "third major league", with its own eight teams, in competition with the established National and American Leagues.

The National League regular season ended on October 6 with the Boston Braves as champions, and the American League regular season concluded the next day with the Philadelphia Athletics as champions. The Federal League season ended on October 10, and saw the Indianapolis Hoosiers winning the Federal League pennant. The postseason between the National and American Leagues began with Game 1 of the 11th World Series on October 9 and ended with Game 4 on October 13. The Braves swept the Athletics in four games, capturing their first championship in franchise history. Both the National and American Leagues rejected offers by the Federal League for a postseason matchup. Going into the season, the defending World Series champions were the Philadelphia Athletics from the 1913 season.

This was the last of four seasons that the Chalmers Award, a precursor to the Major League Baseball Most Valuable Player Award (introduced in 1931), was given to a player in each of the established National and American Leagues.

The Brooklyn Dodgers renamed as the Brooklyn Robins.

The major-league status of the Federal League was confirmed by the Special Baseball Records Committee (as convened by then-Commissioner of Baseball William Eckert) in 1969.

== Schedule ==
The 1914 schedule consisted of 154 games for all teams in the American League, National League, and Federal League, each of which had eight teams. Each team was scheduled to play 22 games against the other seven teams of their respective league. This continued the format first put in place for the 1904 season, and which lasted until the 140-game schedule of 1919. Most teams played more than 154 games, due to tie games (called on account of darkness or weather) that had to be replayed; tie games are excluded from team standings, but the statistics of individual players are included in their season totals.

The Federal League had its Opening Day on April 13, with a game between Buffalo and Baltimore. Opening Day for the American and National Leagues was on April 14, and featured all 16 teams of those leagues, only the third time those two leagues started their season on the same day (the 1912 season had been the second). The National League had its final day of the regular season on October 6, while the American League's final day of the regular season was October 7. The World Series between AL and NL champions took place between October 9 and October 13. The Federal League had the final day of its regular season on October 10.

== Teams ==
An asterisk (*) denotes the ballpark a team played the minority of their home games at

League	Team	City	Ballpark	Capacity	Manager
American League	Boston Red Sox	Boston, Massachusetts	Fenway Park	27,000	Bill Carrigan
American League	Chicago White Sox	Chicago, Illinois	Comiskey Park	28,000	Jimmy Callahan
American League	Cleveland Naps	Cleveland, Ohio	League Park	21,414	Joe Birmingham
American League	Detroit Tigers	Detroit, Michigan	Navin Field	23,000	Hughie Jennings
American League	New York Yankees	New York, New York	Brush Stadium	34,000	Frank Chance
American League	New York Yankees	New York, New York	Brush Stadium	34,000	Roger Peckinpaugh
American League	Philadelphia Athletics	Philadelphia, Pennsylvania	Shibe Park	23,000	Connie Mack
American League	St. Louis Browns	St. Louis, Missouri	Sportsman's Park	18,000	Branch Rickey
American League	Washington Senators	Washington, D.C.	National Park	27,000	Clark Griffith
National League	Boston Braves	Boston, Massachusetts	South End Grounds	11,000	George Stallings
National League	Boston Braves	Boston, Massachusetts	Fenway Park*	27,000*	George Stallings
National League	Brooklyn Robins	New York, New York	Ebbets Field	30,000	Wilbert Robinson
National League	Chicago Cubs	Chicago, Illinois	West Side Park	16,000	Hank O'Day
National League	Cincinnati Reds	Cincinnati, Ohio	Redland Field	20,696	Buck Herzog
National League	New York Giants	New York, New York	Brush Stadium	34,000	John McGraw
National League	Philadelphia Phillies	Philadelphia, Pennsylvania	National League Park	18,000	Red Dooin
National League	Pittsburgh Pirates	Pittsburgh, Pennsylvania	Forbes Field	23,000	Fred Clarke
National League	St. Louis Cardinals	St. Louis, Missouri	Robison Field	21,000	Miller Huggins
Federal League	Baltimore Terrapins	Baltimore, Maryland	Terrapin Park	16,000	Otto Knabe
Federal League	Brooklyn Tip-Tops	New York, New York	Washington Park	18,800	Bill Bradley
Federal League	Buffalo Buffeds	Buffalo, New York	Federal League Park	20,000	Larry Schlafly
Federal League	Chicago Federals	Chicago, Illinois	Weeghman Park	14,000	Joe Tinker
Federal League	Indianapolis Hoosiers	Indianapolis, Indiana	Federal League Park	23,000	Bill Phillips
Federal League	Kansas City Packers	Kansas City, Missouri	Gordon and Koppel Field	12,000	George Stovall
Federal League	Pittsburgh Rebels	Pittsburgh, Pennsylvania	Exposition Park	16,000	Doc Gessler
Federal League	Pittsburgh Rebels	Pittsburgh, Pennsylvania	Exposition Park	16,000	Rebel Oakes
Federal League	St. Louis Terriers	St. Louis, Missouri	Handlan's Park	15,000	Mordecai Brown
Federal League	St. Louis Terriers	St. Louis, Missouri	Handlan's Park	15,000	Fielder Jones

== Standings ==
=== American League ===
American League
Team	W	L	Pct.	GB	Home	Road
Philadelphia Athletics	99	53	.651	—	51‍–‍24	48‍–‍29
Boston Red Sox	91	62	.595	8½	44‍–‍31	47‍–‍31
Washington Senators	81	73	.526	19	40‍–‍33	41‍–‍40
Detroit Tigers	80	73	.523	19½	42‍–‍35	38‍–‍38
St. Louis Browns	71	82	.464	28½	42‍–‍36	29‍–‍46
Chicago White Sox	70	84	.455	30	43‍–‍37	27‍–‍47
New York Yankees	70	84	.455	30	36‍–‍40	34‍–‍44
Cleveland Naps	51	102	.333	48½	32‍–‍47	19‍–‍55

=== National League ===
National League
Team	W	L	Pct.	GB	Home	Road
Boston Braves	94	59	.614	—	51‍–‍25	43‍–‍34
New York Giants	84	70	.545	10½	43‍–‍36	41‍–‍34
St. Louis Cardinals	81	72	.529	13	42‍–‍34	39‍–‍38
Chicago Cubs	78	76	.506	16½	46‍–‍30	32‍–‍46
Brooklyn Robins	75	79	.487	19½	45‍–‍34	30‍–‍45
Philadelphia Phillies	74	80	.481	20½	48‍–‍30	26‍–‍50
Pittsburgh Pirates	69	85	.448	25½	39‍–‍36	30‍–‍49
Cincinnati Reds	60	94	.390	34½	34‍–‍42	26‍–‍52

=== Federal League ===
Federal League
Team	W	L	Pct.	GB	Home	Road
Indianapolis Hoosiers	88	65	.575	—	53‍–‍23	35‍–‍42
Chicago Federals	87	67	.565	1½	43‍–‍34	44‍–‍33
Baltimore Terrapins	84	70	.545	4½	53‍–‍26	31‍–‍44
Buffalo Buffeds	80	71	.530	7	47‍–‍29	33‍–‍42
Brooklyn Tip-Tops	77	77	.500	11½	47‍–‍32	30‍–‍45
Kansas City Packers	67	84	.444	20	37‍–‍36	30‍–‍48
Pittsburgh Rebels	64	86	.427	22½	37‍–‍37	27‍–‍49
St. Louis Terriers	62	89	.411	25	32‍–‍43	30‍–‍46

=== Tie games ===
43 tie games (18 in AL, 10 in NL, 15 in FL), which are not factored into winning percentage or games behind (and were often replayed again) occurred throughout the season.

==== American League ====
- Boston Red Sox, 6
- Chicago White Sox, 3
- Cleveland Naps, 4
- Detroit Tigers, 4
- New York Yankees, 3
- Philadelphia Athletics, 6
- St. Louis Browns, 6
- Washington Senators, 4

==== National League ====
- Boston Braves, 5
- Chicago Cubs, 2
- Cincinnati Reds, 3
- New York Giants, 2
- Pittsburgh Pirates, 4
- St. Louis Cardinals, 4

==== Federal League ====
- Baltimore Terrapins, 6
- Brooklyn Tip-Tops, 3
- Buffalo Buffeds, 4
- Chicago Federals, 3
- Indianapolis Hoosiers, 4
- Kansas City Packers, 3
- Pittsburgh Rebels, 4
- St. Louis Terriers, 3

== Postseason ==
The postseason began on October 9 and ended on October 13 with the Boston Braves sweeping the Philadelphia Athletics in the 1914 World Series in four games. The National and American Leagues refused a postseason against the Federal League.

=== Bracket ===
World Series
AL	Philadelphia Athletics	0
NL	Boston Braves	4

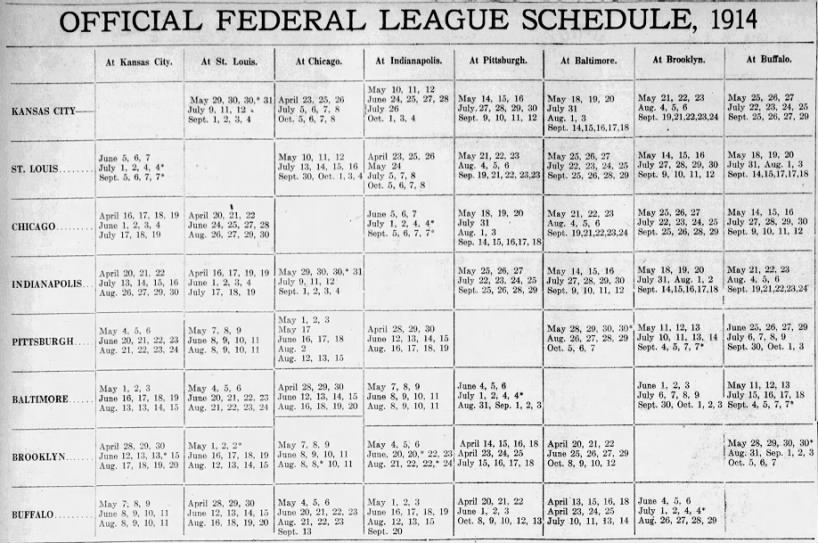
1914 schedule of the Federal League

== Managerial changes ==
=== Off-season ===
Team	Former Manager	New Manager
Brooklyn Robins	Bill Dahlen	Wilbert Robinson
Chicago Cubs	Johnny Evers	Hank O'Day
Cincinnati Reds	Joe Tinker	Buck Herzog

=== In-season ===
Team	Former Manager	New Manager
New York Yankees	Frank Chance	Roger Peckinpaugh

== League leaders ==
Across two leagues, Dave Davenport tied as a leader in saves at 6 (2 with the Cincinnati Reds of the NL and 4 with the St. Louis Terriers of the FL).

=== American League ===
Hitting leaders
Stat	Player	Total
AVG	Ty Cobb (DET)	.368
OPS	Ty Cobb (DET)	.979
HR	Home Run Baker (PHA)	9
RBI	Sam Crawford (DET)	104
R	Eddie Collins (PHA)	122
H	Tris Speaker (BOS)	193
SB	Fritz Maisel (NYY)	74

Pitching leaders
Stat	Player	Total
W	Walter Johnson (WSH)	28
L	Joe Benz (CWS)	19
ERA	Dutch Leonard (BOS)	0.96
K	Walter Johnson (WSH)	225
IP	Walter Johnson (WSH)	371.2
SV	Jack Bentley (WSH); Red Faber (CWS); Roy Mitchell (SLB); Jim Shaw (WSH)	4
WHIP	Dutch Leonard (BOS)	0.886

=== National League ===
Hitting leaders
Stat	Player	Total
AVG	Jake Daubert (BRO)	.329
OPS	Gavvy Cravath (PHI)	.901
HR	Gavvy Cravath (PHI)	19
RBI	Sherry Magee (PHI)	103
R	George Burns (NYG)	100
H	Sherry Magee (PHI)	171
SB	George Burns (NYG)	62

Pitching leaders
Stat	Player	Total
W	Grover Alexander (PHI)	27
L	Red Ames (CIN)	23
ERA	Bill Doak (STL)	1.72
K	Grover Alexander (PHI)	214
IP	Grover Alexander (PHI)	355.0
SV	Red Ames (CIN); Slim Sallee (STL)	6
WHIP	Babe Adams (PIT)	1.032

=== Federal League ===
Hitting leaders
Stat	Player	Total
AVG	Benny Kauff (IND)	.370
OPS	Benny Kauff (IND)	.981
HR	Dutch Zwilling (CWH)	16
RBI	Frank LaPorte (IND)	107
R	Benny Kauff (IND)	120
H	Benny Kauff (IND)	211
SB	Benny Kauff (IND)	75

Pitching leaders
Stat	Player	Total
W	Claude Hendrix (CWH)	29
L	Bob Groom (SLT); Henry Keupper (SLT)	20
ERA	Claude Hendrix (CWH)	1.69
K	Cy Falkenberg (IND)	236
IP	Cy Falkenberg (IND)	377.1
SV	Russ Ford (BUF)	6
WHIP	Russ Ford (BUF)	0.934

== Milestones ==
=== Batters ===
==== Cycles ====
- Ed Lennox (PRB):
  - Lennox hit for his first cycle and first in franchise history, on May 6 against the Kansas City Packers.

==== Other batting accomplishments ====
- Honus Wagner (PIT):
  - Became the second member of the 3,000-hit club with a double in the ninth inning against the Philadelphia Phillies on June 9.
- Nap Lajoie (CLE):
  - Became the third member of the 3,000-hit club with a double in the fifth inning against the New York Yankees in game one of a doubleheader on September 27.

=== Pitchers ===
==== No-hitters ====
- Joe Benz (CWS):
  - Benz threw his first career no-hitter and fifth no-hitter in franchise history, by defeating the Cleveland Naps 6–1 on May 31. Benz walked two and struck out three.
- Iron Davis (BSN):
  - Davis threw his first career no-hitter and fourth no-hitter in franchise history, by defeating the Philadelphia Phillies 7–0 in game 2 of a doubleheader on September 9. Davis walked five and struck out four.
- Ed Lafitte (BKF):
  - Lafitte threw his first career no-hitter and first no-hitter in franchise history, by defeating the Kansas City Packers 6–2 in game 1 of a doubleheader on September 19. Lafitte walked seven, hit one by pitch, and struck out one.

== Awards and honors ==
- Chalmers Award: Johnny Evers (BSN, National); Eddie Collins (PHA, American)

== Home field attendance ==
Team name	Wins	%±	Home attendance	%±	Per game
Boston Red Sox	91	15.2%	481,359	10.1%	6,093
Chicago White Sox	70	−10.3%	469,290	−27.2%	5,794
Detroit Tigers	80	21.2%	416,225	4.4%	5,336
Boston Braves	94	36.2%	382,913	84.1%	4,847
New York Giants	84	−16.8%	364,313	−42.2%	4,554
New York Yankees	70	22.8%	359,477	0.5%	4,609
Philadelphia Athletics	99	3.1%	346,641	−39.4%	4,444
St. Louis Cardinals	81	58.8%	256,099	25.8%	3,242
St. Louis Browns	71	24.6%	244,714	−2.2%	3,021
Washington Senators	81	−10.0%	243,888	−25.1%	3,167
Chicago Cubs	78	−11.4%	202,516	−51.7%	2,665
Cleveland Naps	51	−40.7%	185,997	−65.6%	2,354
Pittsburgh Pirates	69	−11.5%	139,620	−52.8%	1,813
Philadelphia Phillies	74	−15.9%	138,474	−70.5%	1,775
Brooklyn Robins	75	15.4%	122,671	−64.6%	1,553
Cincinnati Reds	60	−6.3%	100,791	−60.9%	1,309

Note: Attendance data for Federal League teams is unavailable.

== Venues ==
The 1914 season saw the two-year Federal League form, and with it, eight new teams in eight new venues:

- The Baltimore Terrapins played at Terrapin Park, former home of the 1901–1902 AL Baltimore Orioles when it was known as Oriole Park.
- The Brooklyn Tip-Tops played at Washington Park, former longtime home of the NL Brooklyn team.
- The Buffalo Buffeds played at Federal League Park.
- The Chicago Federals played at Weeghman Park, current longtime home of the NL Chicago Cubs (known today as Wrigley Field).
- The Indianapolis Hoosiers played their only season at Federal League Park, playing their last game on October 8 against the St. Louis Terriers, relocating to Newark, New Jersey at Harrison Park for the start of the 1915 season.
- The Kansas City Packers played at Gordon and Koppel Field.
- The Pittsburgh Rebels played at Exposition Park, former longtime home of the NL Pittsburgh Pirates and PL Pittsburgh Burghers.
- The St. Louis Terriers played at Handlan's Park.

The Boston Braves would play their last game at their inaugural home at the South End Grounds site on August 11, having played 39 seasons as a Major League team and five seasons as a member of the National Association, back to 1876 and 1871 respectively, and moved into the Boston Red Sox home of Fenway Park on September 7 to accommodate crowds larger than their South End Grounds capacity and the Braves' eventually successful run at the World Series. They previously played their on August 1 and August 8. In all, 29 of their 79 home games were played at Fenway Park. The team would only play at Fenway through July of the following season.

== See also ==
- 1914 in baseball (Events, Births, Deaths)
