= List of Major League Baseball players (B) =

The following is a list of Major League Baseball players, retired or active. As of the end of the 2011 season, there have been 1,702 players with a last name that begins with B who have been on a major league roster at some point.

== B ==
- Charlie Babb
- Bob Babcock
- Loren Babe
- Johnny Babich
- Charlie Babington
- Shooty Babitt
- Brandon Backe
- Les Backman
- Wally Backman
- Eddie Bacon
- Mike Bacsik (RHP)
- Mike Bacsik (LHP)
- Dakota Bacus
- Fred Baczewski
- Akil Baddoo
- Burke Badenhop
- Art Bader
- Harrison Bader
- Lore Bader
- Red Badgro
- Ed Baecht
- Cha Seung Baek
- Carlos Baerga
- Benito Báez
- Danys Báez
- Javier Báez
- José Báez
- Kevin Baez
- Michel Báez
- Pedro Báez
- Sandy Báez
- Jim Bagby
- Jim Bagby Jr.
- Ed Bagley
- Gene Bagley
- Bill Bagwell
- Jeff Bagwell
- Stan Bahnsen
- Ed Bahr
- Frank Bahret
- Grover Baichley
- Scott Bailes
- Andrew Bailey
- Bill Bailey
- Bill Bailey
- Bob Bailey
- Brandon Bailey
- Cory Bailey
- Ed Bailey
- Fred Bailey
- Gene Bailey
- Harvey Bailey
- Homer Bailey
- Howard Bailey
- Jeff Bailey
- Jim Bailey
- King Bailey
- Mark Bailey
- Roger Bailey
- Steve Bailey
- Sweetbread Bailey
- Bob Bailor
- Harold Baines
- Doug Bair
- Al Baird
- Bob Baird
- Doug Baird
- Jeff Baisley
- Jeff Bajenaru
- Dave Bakenhaster
- Al Baker
- Bill Baker
- Bock Baker
- Charlie Baker
- Chuck Baker
- Dave Baker
- Del Baker
- Doug Baker
- Dusty Baker
- Ernie Baker
- Floyd Baker
- Frank Baker (OF)
- Frank "Home Run" Baker β
- Gene Baker
- George Baker
- Howard Baker
- Jack Baker
- Jeff Baker
- Jesse Baker (pitcher)
- Jesse Baker (shortstop)
- John Baker
- Norm Baker
- Scott Baker (LHP)
- Scott Baker (RHP)
- Tom Baker (1930s P)
- Tom Baker (1960s P)
- Tracy Baker
- Paul Bako
- John Balaz
- Steve Balboni
- Bobby Balcena
- Rocco Baldelli
- Jack Baldschun
- Billy Baldwin
- Dave Baldwin
- Henry Baldwin
- James Baldwin
- Jeff Baldwin
- Lady Baldwin
- Mark Baldwin
- Reggie Baldwin
- John Bale
- Wladimir Balentien
- Lee Bales
- Collin Balester
- Grant Balfour
- Art Ball
- Jeff Ball
- Neal Ball
- Jeff Ballard
- Pelham Ballenger
- Jay Baller
- Mark Ballinger
- Win Ballou
- Tony Balsamo
- George Bamberger
- Dave Bancroft β
- Chris Bando
- Sal Bando
- Eddie Bane
- Dick Baney
- Jeff Banister
- Dan Bankhead
- Scott Bankhead
- Brian Banks
- Ernie Banks β
- George Banks
- Josh Banks
- Willie Banks
- Alan Bannister
- Brian Bannister
- Floyd Bannister
- Jack Banta
- Travis Baptist
- Rod Barajas
- Walter Barbare
- Johnny Barbato
- Jap Barbeau
- Steve Barber
- Turner Barber
- Frank Barberich
- Bret Barberie
- Jim Barbieri
- George Barclay
- Daniel Bard
- Josh Bard
- Brian Barden
- Ray Bare
- Jesse Barfield
- John Barfield
- Josh Barfield
- Clyde Barfoot
- Cy Barger
- Brian Bark
- Al Barker
- Glen Barker
- Kevin Barker
- Len Barker
- Ray Barker
- Richie Barker
- Sean Barker
- Andy Barkett
- Brian Barkley
- Jeff Barkley
- Red Barkley
- Sam Barkley
- Mike Barlow
- Tom Barlow
- Clint Barmes
- Babe Barna
- Bill Barnes
- Brian Barnes
- Frank Barnes (LHP)
- Honey Barnes
- Jesse Barnes
- John Barnes
- Larry Barnes
- Lute Barnes
- Red Barnes
- Rich Barnes
- Ross Barnes
- Sam Barnes
- Skeeter Barnes
- Virgil Barnes
- Darwin Barney
- Ed Barney
- Rex Barney
- Les Barnhart
- Chris Barnwell
- Salomé Barojas
- Daniel Barone
- Bob Barr (1880s P)
- Bob Barr (1930s P)
- Jim Barr
- Scotty Barr
- Steve Barr
- Cuno Barragan
- Bill Barrett (OF)
- Bill Barrett (UT)
- Bob Barrett
- Dick Barrett
- Frank Barrett
- Jimmy Barrett
- John Barrett
- Johnny Barrett
- Marty Barrett
- Michael Barrett
- Red Barrett
- Tim Barrett
- Tom Barrett
- Francisco Barrios
- Manuel Barrios
- Red Barron
- Tony Barron
- Ed Barry
- Jack Barry
- Jeff Barry
- Kevin Barry
- Rich Barry
- Shad Barry
- Kimera Bartee
- Dick Bartell
- Bob Barthelson
- Les Bartholomew
- Jason Bartlett
- Boyd Bartley
- Bob Barton
- Brian Barton
- Daric Barton
- Shawn Barton
- Vince Barton
- Cliff Bartosh
- Chris Başak
- Al Baschang
- Monty Basgall
- Walt Bashore
- Eddie Basinski
- Jim Baskette
- Brian Bass
- Dick Bass
- Doc Bass
- John Bass
- Kevin Bass
- Norm Bass
- Randy Bass
- Charley Bassett
- Johnny Bassler
- Charlie Bastian
- Emil Batch
- Joe Batchelder
- Rich Batchelor
- John Bateman
- Billy Bates
- Bud Bates
- Del Bates
- Dick Bates
- Jason Bates
- Johnny Bates
- Ray Bates
- Bill Bathe
- Miguel Batista
- Rafael Batista
- Tony Batista
- Kevin Batiste
- Kim Batiste
- George Batten
- Earl Battey
- Joe Battin
- Allen Battle
- Howard Battle
- Jim Battle
- Chris Batton
- Matt Batts
- Hank Bauer
- Lou Bauer
- Rick Bauer
- Russ Bauers
- Justin Baughman
- Frank Baumann
- Paddy Baumann
- Jim Baumer
- Ross Baumgarten
- Stan Baumgartner
- Frank Baumholtz
- George Bausewine
- Danny Bautista
- Denny Bautista
- José Bautista (IF/OF)
- José Bautista (P)
- Jim Baxes
- Mike Baxes
- Moose Baxter
- Harry Bay
- Jason Bay
- Jonah Bayliss
- Don Baylor
- Bill Bayne
- Yorman Bazardo
- Brandon Beachy
- Bob Beall
- Johnny Beall
- Walter Beall
- Tommy Beals
- Ernie Beam
- T. J. Beam
- Charlie Beamon
- Charlie Beamon Jr.
- Trey Beamon
- Belve Bean
- Billy Bean
- Colter Bean
- Billy Beane
- Dave Beard
- Ollie Beard
- Ralph Beard
- Gene Bearden
- Gary Beare
- Larry Bearnarth
- Kevin Bearse
- Chris Beasley
- Lew Beasley
- Ed Beatin
- Jim Beattie
- Blaine Beatty
- Jim Beauchamp
- Ginger Beaumont
- Ed Beavens
- Johnny Beazley
- Steve Bechler
- George Bechtel
- Boom-Boom Beck
- Erve Beck
- Frank Beck
- Fred Beck
- George Beck
- Rich Beck
- Rod Beck
- Zinn Beck
- Beals Becker
- Heinie Beckendorf
- Heinz Becker
- Joe Becker
- Rich Becker
- Glenn Beckert
- Josh Beckett
- Robbie Beckett
- Gordon Beckham
- Jake Beckley β
- Bill Beckmann
- Joe Beckwith
- Julio Bécquer
- Érik Bédard
- Gene Bedford
- Phil Bedgood
- Hugh Bedient
- Steve Bedrosian
- Fred Beebe
- Matt Beech
- Ed Beecher
- Jodie Beeler
- Fred Beene
- Clarence Beers
- Jim Begley
- Joe Beggs
- Petie Behan
- Rick Behenna
- Hank Behrman
- Joe Beimel
- Kevin Beirne
- Ollie Bejma
- Mark Belanger
- Wayne Belardi
- Kevin Belcher
- Tim Belcher
- Stan Belinda
- Bo Belinsky
- Matt Belisle
- Todd Belitz
- Tim Belk
- Beau Bell
- Bill Bell
- Buddy Bell
- Charlie Bell
- David Bell
- Derek Bell
- Eric Bell
- Frank Bell
- Gary Bell
- George Bell (OF)
- George Bell (P)
- Gus Bell
- Heath Bell
- Hi Bell
- Jay Bell
- Jerry Bell
- Juan Bell
- Kevin Bell
- Les Bell
- Mike Bell (1B)
- Mike Bell (3B)
- Rob Bell
- Rudy Bell
- Zeke Bella
- Steve Bellán
- Albert Belle
- Mark Bellhorn
- Rafael Belliard
- Ronnie Belliard
- Clay Bellinger
- Cody Bellinger
- Carlos Beltrán
- Francis Beltrán
- Rigo Beltrán
- Adrián Beltré
- Esteban Beltré
- Harry Bemis
- Marvin Benard
- Freddie Benavides
- Johnny Bench β
- Chief Bender β
- Art Benedict
- Bruce Benedict
- Alan Benes
- Andy Benes
- Ray Benge
- Benny Bengough
- Juan Beníquez
- Armando Benítez
- Yamil Benítez
- Mike Benjamin
- Stan Benjamin
- Henry Benn
- Ike Benners
- Charlie Bennett
- Dave Bennett
- Dennis Bennett
- Erik Bennett
- Frank Bennett
- Gary Bennett
- Herschel Bennett
- Jeff Bennett
- Joe Bennett
- Joel Bennett
- Shayne Bennett
- Joaquín Benoit
- Kris Benson
- Vern Benson
- Cy Bentley
- Jack Bentley
- Al Benton
- Butch Benton
- Larry Benton
- Rabbit Benton
- Rube Benton
- Sid Benton
- Chad Bentz
- Joe Benz
- Todd Benzinger
- Johnny Berardino
- Lou Berberet
- Jeff Berblinger
- Jason Bere
- Juan Berenguer
- Bruce Berenyi
- Dave Berg
- Moe Berg
- Augie Bergamo
- Bill Bergen
- Marty Bergen
- Boze Berger
- Brandon Berger
- Heinie Berger
- Johnny Berger
- Tun Berger
- Wally Berger
- Peter Bergeron
- John Bergh
- Al Bergman
- Dave Bergman
- Dusty Bergman
- Sean Bergman
- Jason Bergmann
- William Bergolla
- Nate Berkenstock
- Lance Berkman
- Jack Berly
- Roger Bernadina
- Dwight Bernard
- Joe Bernard
- Tony Bernazard
- Adam Bernero
- Bill Bernhard
- Juan Bernhardt
- Walter Bernhardt
- Dale Berra
- Yogi Berra β
- Ray Berres
- Ángel Berroa
- Gerónimo Berroa
- Charlie Berry (2B)
- Charlie Berry (C)
- Claude Berry
- Joe Berry (2B)
- Joe Berry (P)
- Ken Berry
- Neil Berry
- Sean Berry
- Tom Berry
- Damon Berryhill
- Frank Bertaina
- Harry Berte
- Dick Bertell
- Reno Bertoia
- Mike Bertotti
- Lefty Bertrand
- Andrés Berumen
- Fred Besana
- Bob Bescher
- Don Bessent
- Karl Best
- William Bestick
- Rafael Betancourt
- Yuniesky Betancourt
- Frank Betcher
- Wilson Betemit
- Larry Bettencourt
- Huck Betts
- Mookie Betts
- Bruno Betzel
- Kurt Bevacqua
- Hal Bevan
- Bill Bevens
- Jason Beverlin
- Ben Beville
- Monte Beville
- Buddy Biancalana
- Hank Biasatti
- Jim Bibby
- Dante Bichette
- Vern Bickford
- Charlie Bicknell
- Rocky Biddle
- Oscar Bielaski
- Mike Bielecki
- Nick Bierbrodt
- Randor Bierd
- Charlie Bierman
- Steve Bieser
- Carson Bigbee
- Lyle Bigbee
- Larry Bigbie
- Elliot Bigelow
- Craig Biggio
- Larry Biittner
- Dann Bilardello
- Emil Bildilli
- Steve Bilko
- Harry Billiard
- Jack Billingham
- Dick Billings
- Josh Billings
- Brent Billingsley
- Chad Billingsley
- George Binks
- Steve Biras
- Jud Birchall
- Doug Bird
- George Bird
- Mike Birkbeck
- Kurt Birkins
- Ralph Birkofer
- Joe Birmingham
- Babe Birrer
- Tim Birtsas
- John Bischoff
- Joseph Bisenius
- Bill Bishop (1880s P)
- Bill Bishop (1920s P)
- Charlie Bishop
- Jim Bishop
- Lloyd Bishop
- Max Bishop
- Mike Bishop
- Rivington Bisland
- Del Bissonette
- Hiram Bithorn
- Joe Bitker
- Jeff Bittiger
- Red Bittmann
- Brian Bixler
- George Bjorkman
- Bud Black (LHP)
- Bud Black (RHP)
- Dave Black
- Don Black
- Joe Black
- Earl Blackburn
- George Blackburn
- Nick Blackburn
- Lena Blackburne
- Travis Blackley
- Ewell Blackwell
- Tim Blackwell
- Ray Blades
- Rick Bladt
- George Blaeholder
- Bill Blair
- Dennis Blair
- Footsie Blair
- Paul Blair
- Walter Blair
- Willie Blair
- Dick Blaisdell
- Casey Blake
- Ed Blake
- Harry Blake
- Sheriff Blake
- Hank Blalock
- Johnny Blanchard
- Andrés Blanco
- Dámaso Blanco
- Gregor Blanco
- Henry Blanco
- Ossie Blanco
- Tony Blanco
- Fred Blanding
- Cliff Blankenship
- Kevin Blankenship
- Lance Blankenship
- Ted Blankenship
- Larvell Blanks
- Cy Blanton
- Joe Blanton
- Don Blasingame
- Wade Blasingame
- Steve Blateric
- Johnny Blatnik
- Buddy Blattner
- Jeff Blauser
- Henry Blauvelt
- Gary Blaylock
- Ron Blazier
- Curt Blefary
- Ike Blessitt
- Clarence Blethen
- Jerry Blevins
- Ned Bligh
- Elmer Bliss
- Jack Bliss
- Bruno Block
- Cy Block
- Terry Blocker
- Ron Blomberg
- Jimmy Bloodworth
- Willie Bloomquist
- Greg Blosser
- Jack Blott
- Mike Blowers
- Lu Blue
- Vida Blue
- Ossie Bluege
- Jim Bluejacket
- Red Bluhm
- Geoff Blum
- Bert Blyleven
- Mike Blyzka
- Chet Boak
- Frederick Boardman
- Randy Bobb
- Hiram Bocachica
- John Boccabella
- Milt Bocek
- Bruce Bochte
- Doug Bochtler
- Bruce Bochy
- Eddie Bockman
- Randy Bockus
- Brian Bocock
- Mike Boddicker
- Ping Bodie
- Tony Boeckel
- George Boehler
- Len Boehmer
- Brian Boehringer
- Larry Boerner
- Brennan Boesch
- Joe Boever
- Tim Bogar
- Terry Bogener
- Brandon Boggs
- Mitchell Boggs
- Tommy Boggs
- Wade Boggs β
- Brian Bogusevic
- Brian Bohanon
- T. J. Bohn
- Sam Bohne
- John Bohnet
- Bruce Boisclair
- Dan Boitano
- Dick Bokelmann
- Bob Boken
- Joe Bokina
- Boland
- Bernie Boland
- Charlie Bold
- Stew Bolen
- Joe Boley
- Jim Bolger
- Frank Bolick
- Bobby Bolin
- Frank Bolling
- Jack Bolling
- Milt Bolling
- Don Bollweg
- Mike Bolsinger
- Cecil Bolton
- Cliff Bolton
- Tom Bolton
- Rodney Bolton
- Mark Bomback
- Tommy Bond
- Walt Bond
- Jeremy Bonderman
- Barry Bonds
- Bobby Bonds
- George Bone
- Ricky Bones
- Julio Bonetti
- Hank Boney
- Jung Bong
- Nino Bongiovanni
- Bill Bonham
- Tiny Bonham
- Emilio Bonifacio
- Joe Bonikowski
- Eddie Bonine
- Bobby Bonilla
- Juan Bonilla
- Barry Bonnell
- Bobby Bonner
- Frank Bonner
- Bill Bonness
- Boof Bonser
- Zeke Bonura
- Everitt Booe
- Buddy Booker
- Chris Booker
- Greg Booker
- Rod Booker
- Red Booles
- Aaron Boone
- Bob Boone
- Bret Boone
- Dan Boone
- Danny Boone
- Ike Boone
- Lute Boone
- Ray Boone
- Chris Bootcheck
- Booth
- Eddie Booth
- Josh Booty
- John Boozer
- Pedro Borbón
- Pedro Borbón Jr.
- Joe Borchard
- George Borchers
- Frenchy Bordagaray
- Joe Borden
- Pat Borders
- Rich Bordi
- Mike Bordick
- Glenn Borgmann
- Paul Boris
- Frank Bork
- Bob Borkowski
- Dave Borkowski
- Toby Borland
- Tom Borland
- Red Borom
- Steve Boros
- Joe Borowski
- Hank Borowy
- Babe Borton
- Don Bosch
- Rick Bosetti
- Chris Bosio
- Shawn Boskie
- Thad Bosley
- Dick Bosman
- Harley Boss
- Mel Bosser
- Lyman Bostock
- Daryl Boston
- Dave Boswell
- Ken Boswell
- Derek Botelho
- Ricky Bottalico
- John Bottarini
- Kent Bottenfield
- Ralph Botting
- Jim Bottomley β
- Jason Botts
- Bob Botz
- Ed Bouchee
- Denis Boucher
- Lou Boudreau β
- Carl Bouldin
- Steve Bourgeois
- Peter Bourjos
- Michael Bourn
- Rafael Bournigal
- Pat Bourque
- Jim Bouton
- Mike Bovee
- Larry Bowa
- Benny Bowcock
- Michael Bowden
- Rob Bowen
- Ryan Bowen
- Sam Bowen
- Sam Bowens
- Frank Bowerman
- Brent Bowers
- Cedrick Bowers
- Shane Bowers
- Stew Bowers
- Jim Bowie
- Micah Bowie
- John Bowker
- Charlie Bowles
- Weldon Bowlin
- Steve Bowling
- Abe Bowman
- Bill Bowman
- Bob Bowman
- Elmer Bowman
- Ernie Bowman
- Joe Bowman
- Sumner Bowman
- Ted Bowsfield
- Travis Bowyer
- Bill Boyd
- Bob Boyd
- Gary Boyd
- Jason Boyd
- Oil Can Boyd
- Blaine Boyer
- Clete Boyer
- Cloyd Boyer
- Ken Boyer
- Doe Boyland
- Buzz Boyle
- Eddie Boyle
- Jack Boyle (C / 1B)
- Jack Boyle (3B)
- Gene Brabender
- Gibby Brack
- Jack Bracken
- Dallas Braden
- John Brackenridge
- Bill Bradford
- Buddy Bradford
- Chad Bradford
- Bill Bradley
- Foghorn Bradley
- George Bradley
- Herb Bradley
- Hugh Bradley
- Jack Bradley
- Mark Bradley
- Milton Bradley
- Phil Bradley
- Ryan Bradley
- Scott Bradley
- Tom Bradley
- Dallas Bradshaw
- Joe Bradshaw
- Terry Bradshaw
- Brian Brady
- Cliff Brady
- Doug Brady
- King Brady
- Neal Brady
- Spike Brady
- Bobby Bragan
- Darren Bragg
- Dick Braggins
- Glenn Braggs
- Dave Brain
- Asa Brainard
- Erv Brame
- Art Bramhall
- Ralph Branca
- Al Brancato
- Norm Branch
- Roy Branch
- Ron Brand
- Mark Brandenburg
- Bucky Brandon
- Ed Brandt
- Jackie Brandt
- Mike Brannock
- Kitty Bransfield
- Jeff Branson
- Marshall Brant
- Cliff Brantley
- Jeff Brantley
- Mickey Brantley
- Russell Branyan
- Fred Bratschi
- Ryan Braun (3B)
- Ryan Braun (pitcher)
- Steve Braun
- Ángel Bravo
- Garland Braxton
- Bill Bray
- Buster Bray
- Craig Brazell
- Dewon Brazelton
- Frank Brazill
- Al Brazle
- Yhency Brazobán
- Lesli Brea
- Sid Bream
- Jim Breazeale
- Harry Brecheen
- Brent Brede
- Danny Breeden
- Hal Breeden
- Marv Breeding
- Fred Breining
- Alonzo Breitenstein
- Ted Breitenstein
- Bob Brenly
- Ad Brennan
- Don Brennan
- Jack Brennan
- Tom Brennan
- William Brennan
- Jim Brenneman
- Bert Brenner
- Lynn Brenton
- Bill Brenzel
- Craig Breslow
- Roger Bresnahan β
- Rube Bressler
- Eddie Bressoud
- George Brett β
- Herb Brett
- Ken Brett
- Billy Brewer
- Chet Brewer
- Jack Brewer
- Jim Brewer
- Rod Brewer
- Tom Brewer
- Tony Brewer
- Jamie Brewington
- Charlie Brewster
- Fred Brickell
- Fritz Brickell
- Ralph Brickner
- Jim Brideweser
- Marshall Bridges
- Rocky Bridges
- Tommy Bridges
- Al Bridwell
- Bunny Brief
- Buttons Briggs
- Dan Briggs
- John Briggs
- Johnny Briggs
- Harry Bright
- Nelson Briles
- Greg Briley
- Frank Brill
- Jim Brillheart
- Bill Brinker
- Chuck Brinkman
- Ed Brinkman
- Leon Brinkopf
- John Briscoe
- Lou Brissie
- George Bristow
- Bernardo Brito
- Eude Brito
- Jorge Brito
- Juan Brito
- Tilson Brito
- Jim Britt
- Jack Brittin
- Chris Britton
- Jim Britton
- Zach Britton
- Tony Brizzolara
- Johnny Broaca
- Lance Broadway
- Pete Broberg
- Doug Brocail
- Greg Brock
- John Brock
- Lou Brock β
- Matt Broderick
- King Brockett
- Steve Brodie
- Dick Brodowski
- Ernie Broglio
- Rico Brogna
- Jack Brohamer
- Troy Brohawn
- Jeff Bronkey
- Herman Bronkie
- Jim Bronstad
- Ike Brookens
- Tom Brookens
- Bobby Brooks
- Frank Brooks
- Hubie Brooks
- Jerry Brooks
- Scott Brosius
- Jim Brosnan
- Terry Bross
- Mark Brouhard
- Ben Broussard
- Dan Brouthers β
- Joe Brovia
- Scott Brow
- Bob Brower
- Frank Brower
- Jim Brower
- Louis Brower
- Adrian Brown
- Alton Brown
- Andrew Brown (OF)
- Andrew Brown (P)
- Bob Brown
- Bobby Brown (3B)
- Bobby Brown (OF)
- Boardwalk Brown
- Brant Brown
- Buster Brown
- Charlie Brown
- Chris Brown
- Clint Brown
- Curt Brown
- Curtis Brown
- Darrell Brown
- Dee Brown
- Dick Brown
- Ed Brown
- Eddie Brown
- Elmer Brown
- Emil Brown
- Fred Brown
- Gates Brown
- Hal Brown
- Ike Brown
- Jackie Brown
- Jamie Brown
- Jarvis Brown
- Jeremy Brown
- Jim Brown (P)
- Jim Brown (OF)
- Jimmy Brown
- John Brown
- Jumbo Brown
- Keith Brown
- Kevin Brown (C)
- Kevin Brown (RHP)
- Kevin Brown (LHP)
- Larry Brown
- Leon Brown
- Lew Brown
- Lindsay Brown
- Lloyd Brown
- Mace Brown
- Mark Brown
- Marty Brown
- Mike Brown (P)
- Mike Brown (OF)
- Mordecai "Three Finger" Brown β
- Ollie Brown
- Paul Brown
- Randy Brown
- Robert Brown
- Roosevelt Brown
- Scott Brown
- Steve Brown
- Tom Brown (CF)
- Tom Brown (OF/1B)
- Tom Brown (P)
- Tommy Brown
- Walter Brown
- Willard Brown β
- Byron Browne
- George Browne
- Jerry Browne
- Frank Browning
- Pete Browning
- Tom Browning
- Mark Brownson
- Jonathan Broxton
- Bruce Brubaker
- Bob Bruce
- Jay Bruce
- Fred Bruckbauer
- Earle Brucker Sr.
- Earle Brucker Jr.
- Andy Bruckmiller
- J. T. Bruett
- Cliff Brumbaugh
- Jacob Brumfield
- Duff Brumley
- Mike Brumley (C)
- Mike Brumley (IF)
- Glenn Brummer
- Greg Brummett
- Tom Brunansky
- Jack Bruner
- Roy Bruner
- George Brunet
- Justin Brunette
- Brian Bruney
- Tom Bruno
- Arlo Brunsberg
- Will Brunson
- Eric Bruntlett
- Jim Bruske
- Warren Brusstar
- Bill Bruton
- Billy Bryan
- Clay Bryant
- Derek Bryant
- Don Bryant
- Ralph Bryant
- Ron Bryant
- T. R. Bryden
- Steve Brye
- Jaime Bubela
- Johnny Bucha
- Bob Buchanan
- Brian Buchanan
- Jim Buchanan
- Jim Bucher
- Jerry Buchek
- Jim Bucher
- Clay Buchholz
- Taylor Buchholz
- John Buck
- Travis Buck
- Garland Buckeye
- Fred Buckingham
- Jess Buckles
- John Buckley
- Kevin Buckley
- Bill Buckner
- Billy Buckner
- Jay Budd
- Mike Buddie
- Don Buddin
- Mark Budzinski
- Steve Buechele
- Mark Buehrle
- Fritz Buelow
- Francisley Bueno
- Charlie Buffinton
- Damon Buford
- Don Buford
- Bob Buhl
- Jay Buhner
- DeWayne Buice
- Cy Buker
- Ryan Bukvich
- Jason Bulger
- Scott Bullett
- Jim Bullinger
- Kirk Bullinger
- Bryan Bullington
- Eric Bullock
- Red Bullock
- William B Bullock
- Al Bumbry
- Madison Bumgarner
- Nate Bump
- Melvin Bunch
- Wally Bunker
- Jim Bunning β
- Dave Burba
- Bill Burbach
- Nelson Burbrink
- Al Burch
- Ernie Burch
- Larry Burchart
- Fred Burchell
- Bob Burda
- Lew Burdette
- Jack Burdock
- Smoky Burgess
- Tom Burgess
- Tom Burgmeier
- Bill Burgo
- Ambiorix Burgos
- Enrique Burgos
- Bill Burich
- Mack Burk
- Sandy Burk
- Elmer Burkart
- Bill Burke
- Bobby Burke
- Chris Burke
- Dan Burke
- Eddie Burke
- Frank Burke
- Glenn Burke
- Jamie Burke
- Jimmy Burke
- John Burke
- Leo Burke
- Les Burke
- Mike Burke
- Steve Burke
- Tim Burke
- Jesse Burkett β
- John Burkett
- Ken Burkhart
- Morgan Burkhart
- Ellis Burks
- Rick Burleson
- A. J. Burnett
- Hercules Burnett
- Johnny Burnett
- Sean Burnett
- Wally Burnette
- Jeromy Burnitz
- Bill Burns
- Britt Burns
- Dick Burns
- Ed Burns
- Farmer Burns
- George Burns (1B)
- George Burns (LF)
- Jack Burns
- Mike Burns
- Oyster Burns
- Todd Burns
- Tom Burns
- Pete Burnside
- Sheldon Burnside
- Alex Burr
- Buster Burrell
- Pat Burrell
- Brian Burres
- Larry Burright
- Ray Burris
- Emmanuel Burriss
- Jeff Burroughs
- Sean Burroughs
- John Burrows
- Terry Burrows
- Dick Burrus
- Ellis Burton
- Jared Burton
- Jim Burton
- Moe Burtschy
- Bill Burwell
- Dick Burwell
- Jim Busby
- Paul Busby
- Steve Busby
- Mike Busch
- Brian Buscher
- Bullet Joe Bush
- Dave Bush
- Donie Bush
- Guy Bush
- Homer Bush
- Randy Bush
- Jack Bushelman
- Frank Bushey
- Chris Bushing
- Doc Bushong
- Mike Buskey
- Tom Buskey
- Hank Butcher
- John Butcher
- Max Butcher
- Mike Butcher
- Sal Butera
- Bill Butland
- Bill Butler
- Billy Butler
- Brent Butler
- Brett Butler
- Charlie Butler
- Ike Butler
- John Butler
- Johnny Butler
- Rich Butler
- Rob Butler
- Ralph Buxton
- Joe Buzas
- John Buzhardt
- Bud Byerly
- Freddie Bynum
- Mike Bynum
- Bill Byrd
- Harry Byrd
- Jeff Byrd
- Jim Byrd
- Marlon Byrd
- Paul Byrd
- Sammy Byrd
- Tim Byrdak
- Bobby Byrne
- Tommy Byrne
- Eric Byrnes
- Marty Bystrom
