= 1914 Cleveland Naps season =

1914 Cleveland Naps
- League: American League
- Ballpark: League Park II
- City: Cleveland, Ohio
- Record: 51–102 (.333)
- League place: 8th
- Owners: Charles Somers
- Managers: Joe Birmingham

The 1914 Cleveland Naps season was a season in the history of American baseball. The team finished eighth in the eight-team American League with a record of 51–102, 48½ games behind the Philadelphia Athletics. This was their final season with the nickname "Naps", as they changed their name to the Indians from the following season, a name they kept for the next 107 years.

== Regular season ==
=== Season standings ===
American League
Team	W	L	Pct.	GB	Home	Road
Philadelphia Athletics	99	53	.651	—	51‍–‍24	48‍–‍29
Boston Red Sox	91	62	.595	8½	44‍–‍31	47‍–‍31
Washington Senators	81	73	.526	19	40‍–‍33	41‍–‍40
Detroit Tigers	80	73	.523	19½	42‍–‍35	38‍–‍38
St. Louis Browns	71	82	.464	28½	42‍–‍36	29‍–‍46
Chicago White Sox	70	84	.455	30	43‍–‍37	27‍–‍47
New York Yankees	70	84	.455	30	36‍–‍40	34‍–‍44
Cleveland Naps	51	102	.333	48½	32‍–‍47	19‍–‍55

=== Record vs. opponents ===
1914 American League record Sources:
Team	BOS	CWS	CLE	DET	NYH	PHA	SLB	WSH
Boston	—	13–9	16–6	15–7–1	11–11	12–9–3	13–9–2	11–11
Chicago	9–13	—	13–9	6–16	12–10–1	5–17	13–9–1	12–10–1
Cleveland	6–16	9–13	—	6–16	8–14–1	3–19	8–13–2	11–11–1
Detroit	7–15–1	16–6	16–6	—	13–9–1	9–12–1	9–13	10–12–1
New York	11–11	10–12–1	14–8–1	9–13–1	—	8–14	11–11	7–15
Philadelphia	9–12–3	17–5	19–3	12–9–1	14–8	—	15–7–1	13–9–1
St. Louis	9–13–2	9–13–1	13–8–2	13–9	11–11	7–15–1	—	9–13
Washington	11–11	10–12–1	11–11–1	12–10–1	15–7	9–13–1	13–9	—

=== Roster ===
1914 Cleveland Naps
Roster
Pitchers: George Beck; Henry Benn; Lloyd Bishop; Fred Blanding; Abe Bowman; Paul Carter; Allan Collamore; Fritz Coumbe; Nick Cullop; Harley Dillinger; Vean Gregg; Rip Hagerman; Lefty James; Sam Jones; George Kahler; Willie Mitchell; Guy Morton; Bill Steen; Al Tedrow	Catchers: Johnny Bassler; Josh Billings; Fred Carisch; Ben Egan; Frank Mills; Steve O'Neill; Infielders: Walter Barbare; Rivington Bisland; Ray Chapman; Al Cypert; George Dunlop; Bruce Hartford; Doc Johnston; Nap Lajoie; Ivy Olson; Larry Pezold; Terry Turner; Bill Wambsganss	Outfielders: Joe Birmingham; Tinsley Ginn; Jack Graney; Joe Jackson; Jay Kirke; Nemo Leibold; Jack Lelivelt; Elmer Smith; Roy Wood; Other positions: Tom Reilly	Manager: Joe Birmingham

== Player stats ==
=== Batting ===
==== Starters by position ====
Note: Pos = Position; G = Games played; AB = At bats; H = Hits; Avg. = Batting average; HR = Home runs; RBI = Runs batted in

Pos	Player	G	AB	H	Avg.	HR	RBI
C	Steve O'Neill	87	269	68	.253	0	20
1B	Doc Johnston	104	340	83	.244	0	23
2B	Nap Lajoie	121	419	108	.258	0	50
SS	Ray Chapman	106	375	103	.275	2	42
3B	Terry Turner	121	428	105	.245	1	33
OF	Joe Jackson	122	453	143	.338	3	53
OF	Jack Graney	130	460	122	.265	1	39
OF	Nemo Leibold	115	402	106	.264	0	32

==== Other batters ====
Note: G = Games played; AB = At bats; H = Hits; Avg. = Batting average; HR = Home runs; RBI = Runs batted in

Player	G	AB	H	Avg.	HR	RBI
Ivy Olson	89	310	75	.242	1	20
Jay Kirke	67	242	66	.273	1	25
Roy Wood	72	220	52	.236	1	15
Bill Wambsganss	43	143	31	.217	0	12
Fred Carisch	40	102	22	.216	0	5
Ben Egan	29	88	20	.227	0	11
Johnny Bassler	43	77	14	.182	0	6
Larry Pezold	23	71	16	.225	0	5
Jack Lelivelt	34	64	21	.328	0	13
Rivington Bisland	18	57	6	.105	0	2
Elmer Smith	13	53	17	.321	0	8
Walter Barbare	15	52	16	.308	0	5
Joe Birmingham	19	47	6	.128	0	4
Bruce Hartford	8	22	4	.182	0	0
Frank Mills	4	8	1	.125	0	0
Josh Billings	11	8	2	.250	0	0
George Dunlop	1	3	0	.000	0	0
Tom Reilly	1	1	0	.000	0	0
Tinsley Ginn	2	1	0	.000	0	0
Al Cypert	1	1	0	.000	0	0

=== Pitching ===
==== Starting pitchers ====
Note: G = Games pitched; IP = Innings pitched; W = Wins; L = Losses; ERA = Earned run average; SO = Strikeouts

Player	G	IP	W	L	ERA	SO
Willie Mitchell	39	257.0	11	17	3.19	179
Bill Steen	30	200.2	9	14	2.60	97
Rip Hagerman	37	198.0	9	15	3.09	112
Vean Gregg	17	96.2	9	3	3.07	56
Paul Carter	5	24.2	1	3	2.92	9

==== Other pitchers ====
Note: G = Games pitched; IP = Innings pitched; W = Wins; L = Losses; ERA = Earned run average; SO = Strikeouts

Player	G	IP	W	L	ERA	SO
Guy Morton	25	128.0	1	13	3.02	80
Fred Blanding	29	116.0	4	9	3.96	35
Allan Collamore	27	105.1	3	7	3.25	32
Abe Bowman	22	72.2	2	7	4.46	27
Fritz Coumbe	14	55.1	1	5	3.25	22
Lefty James	17	50.2	0	3	3.20	16
Harley Dillinger	11	33.2	0	1	4.54	11
Al Tedrow	4	22.1	1	2	1.21	4
George Kahler	2	14.0	0	1	3.86	3
Lloyd Bishop	3	8.0	0	1	5.63	1

==== Relief pitchers ====
Note: G = Games pitched; W = Wins; L = Losses; SV = Saves; ERA = Earned run average; SO = Strikeouts

Player	G	W	L	SV	ERA	SO
Nick Cullop	1	0	1	0	2.70	3
Sam Jones	1	0	0	0	2.70	0
Henry Benn	1	0	0	0	0.00	1
George Beck	1	0	0	0	0.00	0
