= 1913 St. Louis Browns season =

Major League Baseball season

1913 St. Louis Browns
- League: American League
- Ballpark: Sportsman's Park
- City: St. Louis, Missouri
- Record: 57–96 (.373)
- League place: 8th
- Owners: Robert Hedges
- Managers: George Stovall, Jimmy Austin, and Branch Rickey

The 1913 St. Louis Browns season involved the Browns finishing 8th in the American League with a record of 57 wins and 96 losses.

== Regular season ==
=== Season standings ===
American League
Team	W	L	Pct.	GB	Home	Road
Philadelphia Athletics	96	57	.627	—	50‍–‍26	46‍–‍31
Washington Senators	90	64	.584	6½	42‍–‍35	48‍–‍29
Cleveland Naps	86	66	.566	9½	45‍–‍32	41‍–‍34
Boston Red Sox	79	71	.527	15½	41‍–‍34	38‍–‍37
Chicago White Sox	78	74	.513	17½	40‍–‍37	38‍–‍37
Detroit Tigers	66	87	.431	30	34‍–‍42	32‍–‍45
New York Yankees	57	94	.377	38	27‍–‍47	30‍–‍47
St. Louis Browns	57	96	.373	39	31‍–‍46	26‍–‍50

=== Record vs. opponents ===
1913 American League record Sources:
Team	BOS	CWS	CLE	DET	NYY	PHA	SLB	WSH
Boston	—	10–11	8–13	13–9	14–6–1	11–11	17–5	6–16
Chicago	11–10	—	9–13–1	13–9	11–10	11–11	12–10	11–11
Cleveland	13–8	13–9–1	—	14–7	14–8–1	9–13	16–6–1	7–15
Detroit	9–13	9–13	7–14	—	11–11	7–15	11–11	12–10
New York	6–14–1	10–11	8–14–1	11–11	—	5–17	11–11	6–16
Philadelphia	11–11	11–11	13–9	15–7	17–5	—	15–6	14–8
St. Louis	5–17	10–12	6–16–1	11–11	11–11	6–15	—	8–14–1
Washington	16–6	11–11	15–7	10–12	16–6	8–14	14–8–1	—

=== Notable transactions ===
- September 15, 1913: Rivington Bisland was drafted by the Browns from the Atlanta Crackers in the 1913 rule 5 draft.

=== Roster ===
1913 St. Louis Browns
Roster
Pitchers: Willie Adams; Mack Allison; George Baumgardner; Curly Brown; Earl Hamilton; Walt Leverenz; Roy Mitchell; Jack Powell; Pete Schmidt; Hal Schwenk; Dwight Stone; Wiley Taylor; Carl Weilman	Catchers: Sam Agnew; Walt Alexander; Frank Crossin; Bill McAllester; Infielders: Jimmy Austin; Mike Balenti; Rivington Bisland; Bunny Brief; Sam Covington; Charlie Flannigan; Fred Graf; Doc Lavan; Del Pratt; George Stovall; Bobby Wallace; Dee Walsh; Buzzy Wares	Outfielders: Pete Compton; Johnny Johnston; George Maisel; Walt Meinert; Burt Shotton; Tod Sloan; Ernie Walker; Tilly Walker; Gus Williams; Other batters: Luther Bonin; George Tomer	Manager: Jimmy Austin; Branch Rickey; George Stovall

== Player stats ==
=== Batting ===
==== Starters by position ====
Note: Pos = Position; G = Games played; AB = At bats; H = Hits; Avg. = Batting average; HR = Home runs; RBI = Runs batted in

Pos	Player	G	AB	H	Avg.	HR	RBI
C	Sam Agnew	105	307	64	.208	2	24
1B	George Stovall	89	303	87	.287	1	24
2B	Del Pratt	155	592	175	.296	2	87
SS	Mike Balenti	70	211	38	.180	0	11
3B	Jimmy Austin	142	489	130	.266	2	42
OF	Burt Shotton	147	549	163	.297	1	28
OF	Johnny Johnston	111	380	85	.224	2	27
OF	Gus Williams	148	538	147	.273	5	53

==== Other batters ====
Note: G = Games played; AB = At bats; H = Hits; Avg. = Batting average; HR = Home runs; RBI = Runs batted in

Player	G	AB	H	Avg.	HR	RBI
Bunny Brief	85	258	56	.217	1	26
Doc Lavan	46	149	21	.141	0	4
Bobby Wallace	55	147	31	.211	0	21
Walt Alexander	43	110	15	.136	0	7
Pete Compton	63	100	18	.180	2	17
Bill McAllester	49	85	13	.153	0	6
Tilly Walker	23	85	25	.294	0	11
Sam Covington	20	60	9	.150	0	4
Dee Walsh	23	53	9	.170	0	5
Rivington Bisland	12	44	6	.136	0	3
Buzzy Wares	11	35	10	.286	0	1
Tod Sloan	7	26	7	.269	0	2
George Maisel	11	18	3	.167	0	1
Ernie Walker	7	14	3	.214	0	2
Walt Meinert	4	8	3	.375	0	0
Fred Graf	4	5	2	.400	0	2
Frank Crossin	4	4	1	.250	0	0
Charlie Flannigan	4	3	0	.000	0	0
Luther Bonin	1	1	0	.000	0	0
George Tomer	1	1	0	.000	0	0

=== Pitching ===
==== Starting pitchers ====
Note: G = Games pitched; IP = Innings pitched; W = Wins; L = Losses; ERA = Earned run average; SO = Strikeouts

Player	G	IP	W	L	ERA	SO
George Baumgardner	38	253.1	10	19	3.13	78
Carl Weilman	39	251.2	10	19	3.40	79
Roy Mitchell	33	245.1	13	16	3.01	59
Earl Hamilton	31	217.1	13	12	2.57	101
Walt Leverenz	30	202.2	6	17	2.58	87
Wiley Taylor	5	31.2	0	2	4.83	12
Curly Brown	2	14.0	1	1	2.57	3
Hal Schwenk	1	11.0	1	0	3.27	3

==== Other pitchers ====
Note: G = Games pitched; IP = Innings pitched; W = Wins; L = Losses; ERA = Earned run average; SO = Strikeouts

Player	G	IP	W	L	ERA	SO
Dwight Stone	18	91.0	2	6	3.56	37
Mack Allison	11	51.1	1	3	2.28	12

==== Relief pitchers ====
Note: G = Games pitched; W = Wins; L = Losses; SV = Saves; ERA = Earned run average; SO = Strikeouts

Player	G	W	L	SV	ERA	SO
Willie Adams	4	0	0	0	10.00	5
Jack Powell	2	0	0	0	0.00	0
Pete Schmidt	1	0	0	0	4.50	0
