= 1913 Cleveland Naps season =

1913 Cleveland Naps
- League: American League
- Ballpark: League Park II
- City: Cleveland, Ohio
- Record: 86–66 (.566)
- League place: 3rd
- Owners: Charles Somers
- Managers: Joe Birmingham

The 1913 Cleveland Naps season was a season in American baseball. The team finished third in the American League with a record of 86–66, 9½ games behind the Philadelphia Athletics.

== Regular season ==
=== Season standings ===
American League
Team	W	L	Pct.	GB	Home	Road
Philadelphia Athletics	96	57	.627	—	50‍–‍26	46‍–‍31
Washington Senators	90	64	.584	6½	42‍–‍35	48‍–‍29
Cleveland Naps	86	66	.566	9½	45‍–‍32	41‍–‍34
Boston Red Sox	79	71	.527	15½	41‍–‍34	38‍–‍37
Chicago White Sox	78	74	.513	17½	40‍–‍37	38‍–‍37
Detroit Tigers	66	87	.431	30	34‍–‍42	32‍–‍45
New York Yankees	57	94	.377	38	27‍–‍47	30‍–‍47
St. Louis Browns	57	96	.373	39	31‍–‍46	26‍–‍50

=== Record vs. opponents ===
1913 American League record Sources:
Team	BOS	CWS	CLE	DET	NYY	PHA	SLB	WSH
Boston	—	10–11	8–13	13–9	14–6–1	11–11	17–5	6–16
Chicago	11–10	—	9–13–1	13–9	11–10	11–11	12–10	11–11
Cleveland	13–8	13–9–1	—	14–7	14–8–1	9–13	16–6–1	7–15
Detroit	9–13	9–13	7–14	—	11–11	7–15	11–11	12–10
New York	6–14–1	10–11	8–14–1	11–11	—	5–17	11–11	6–16
Philadelphia	11–11	11–11	13–9	15–7	17–5	—	15–6	14–8
St. Louis	5–17	10–12	6–16–1	11–11	11–11	6–15	—	8–14–1
Washington	16–6	11–11	15–7	10–12	16–6	8–14	14–8–1	—

=== Roster ===
1913 Cleveland Naps
Roster
Pitchers: Jim Baskette; Fred Blanding; Lynn Brenton; Nick Cullop; Lee Dashner; Cy Falkenberg; Luke Glavenich; Dave Gregg; Vean Gregg; Lefty James; George Kahler; Willie Mitchell; Bill Steen	Catchers: Johnny Bassler; Josh Billings; Fred Carisch; Ernie Krueger; Grover Land; Steve O'Neill; Infielders: Ray Bates; Ray Chapman; George Dunlop; Eddie Edmonson; Doc Johnston; Larry Kopf; Nap Lajoie; Ivy Olson; Terry Turner	Outfielders: Joe Birmingham; Jack Graney; Joe Jackson; Nemo Leibold; Jack Lelivelt; Buddy Ryan; Billy Southworth; Other positions: Johnny Beall; Roger Peckinpaugh; Josh Swindell; George Young	Manager: Joe Birmingham

== Player stats ==
=== Batting ===
==== Starters by position ====
Note: Pos = Position; G = Games played; AB = At bats; H = Hits; Avg. = Batting average; HR = Home runs; RBI = Runs batted in

Pos	Player	G	AB	H	Avg.	HR	RBI
C	Steve O'Neill	80	234	69	.295	0	29
1B	Doc Johnston	133	530	135	.255	2	39
2B	Nap Lajoie	137	465	156	.335	1	68
SS	Ray Chapman	141	508	131	.258	3	39
3B	Ivy Olson	104	370	92	.249	0	32
OF	Joe Jackson	148	528	197	.373	7	71
OF	Jack Graney	148	517	138	.267	3	68
OF	Nemo Leibold	93	286	74	.259	0	12

==== Other batters ====
Note: G = Games played; AB = At bats; H = Hits; Avg. = Batting average; HR = Home runs; RBI = Runs batted in

Player	G	AB	H	Avg.	HR	RBI
Terry Turner	120	388	96	.247	0	44
Buddy Ryan	73	243	72	.296	0	32
Fred Carisch	82	222	48	.216	0	26
Joe Birmingham	47	131	37	.282	0	15
Grover Land	17	47	11	.234	0	9
Ray Bates	27	30	5	.167	0	4
Jack Lelivelt	23	23	9	.391	0	7
George Dunlop	7	17	4	.235	0	0
Larry Kopf	6	10	3	.300	0	1
Johnny Beall	6	6	1	.167	0	1
Ernie Krueger	5	6	0	.000	0	0
Eddie Edmonson	2	5	0	.000	0	0
Josh Billings	1	3	0	.000	0	0
Johnny Bassler	1	2	0	.000	0	0
George Young	2	2	0	.000	0	0
Billy Southworth	1	0	0	----	0	0
Josh Swindell	1	0	0	----	0	0
Roger Peckinpaugh	1	0	0	----	0	0

=== Pitching ===
==== Starting pitchers ====
Note: G = Games pitched; IP = Innings pitched; W = Wins; L = Losses; ERA = Earned run average; SO = Strikeouts

Player	G	IP	W	L	ERA	SO
Vean Gregg	44	285.2	20	13	2.24	166
Cy Falkenberg	39	276.0	23	10	2.22	166
Willie Mitchell	35	217.0	14	8	1.91	141

==== Other pitchers ====
Note: G = Games pitched; IP = Innings pitched; W = Wins; L = Losses; ERA = Earned run average; SO = Strikeouts

Player	G	IP	W	L	ERA	SO
Fred Blanding	41	215.0	15	10	2.55	63
Bill Steen	22	128.1	4	5	2.45	57
George Kahler	24	117.2	5	11	3.14	43
Nick Cullop	23	97.2	3	6	4.42	30
Lefty James	11	39.0	2	3	3.00	18
Jim Baskette	2	4.2	0	0	5.79	0

==== Relief pitchers ====
Note: G = Games pitched; W = Wins; L = Losses; SV = Saves; ERA = Earned run average; SO = Strikeouts

Player	G	W	L	SV	ERA	SO
Lynn Brenton	1	0	0	0	9.00	2
Lee Dashner	1	0	0	0	5.40	2
Luke Glavenich	1	0	0	0	9.00	1
Dave Gregg	1	0	0	0	18.00	0
