= Bisland =

Bisland may refer to:

== People with the surname ==
- Elizabeth Bisland (1861-1929), American journalist
- Rivington Bisland (1890–1973), American baseball player

== Other ==
- Battle of Fort Bisland, battle during the American Civil War
