= George Dunlop =

George Dunlop may refer to:

- George Dunlop (baseball) (1888–1971), American baseball infielder
- George Dunlop (cricketer) (1846–1929), Scottish cricketer
- George Dunlop (footballer) (born 1956), football goalkeeper
- George Kelly Dunlop (1830–1888), missionary bishop

== See also ==
- George Dunlop Leslie (1835–1921), English painter
