= Luke Glavenich =

American baseball player (1893-1935)

- Pitcher
- Born: January 17, 1893; Jackson, California
- Died: May 22, 1935 (aged 42); Stockton, California
- Batted: Right Threw: Right

MLB debut
- April 12, 1913, for the Cleveland Naps

Last MLB appearance
- April 12, 1913, for the Cleveland Naps

MLB statistics
- Win–loss record: 0–0
- Earned run average: 9.00
- Strikeouts: 1
- Stats at Baseball Reference

Teams
- Cleveland Naps (1913)

Luke Frank Glavenich (January 17, 1893 – May 22, 1935) was a Major League Baseball pitcher who played for one season. He pitched for the Cleveland Naps for one game during the 1913 Cleveland Naps season. He attended Saint Mary's College of California.

Glavenich was raised in Jackson, California and, as his father was from Slavonia, spoke Slavonian as his first language. As a youth, he dropped out of school to pursue gold mining but was persuaded by his father to return to his education and complete high school and eventually college. As a pitcher at St. Mary's College, he once threw two one-hitters in the span of four days against Stanford University.
