= Charlie Flannigan =

Charlie Flannigan may refer to:

- Charlie Flannigan (baseball)
- Charlie Flannigan (stockman)

== See also ==
- Charles Flanagan, Irish politician
- Charles G. Flanagan, American college football player and coach
