= Walt Leverenz =

American baseball player

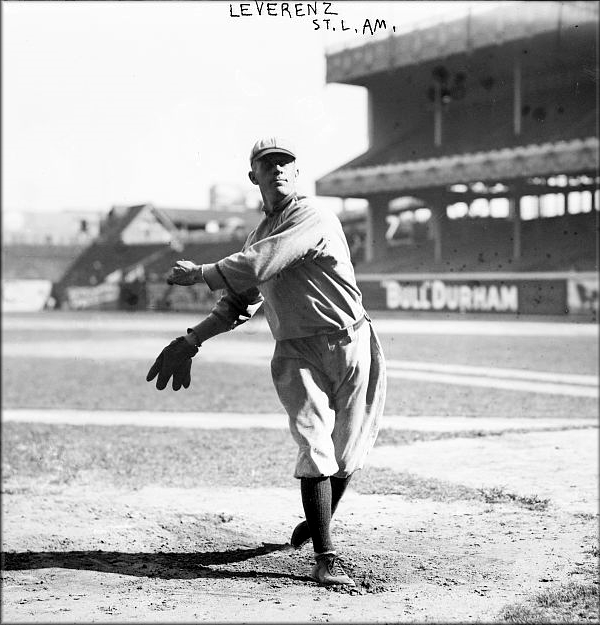
- Pitcher
- Born: July 21, 1888; Chicago, Illinois, U.S.
- Died: March 19, 1973 (aged 84); Atascadero, California, U.S.
- Batted: Left Threw: Left

MLB debut
- April 13, 1913, for the St. Louis Browns

Last MLB appearance
- July 23, 1915, for the St. Louis Browns

MLB statistics
- Win–loss record: 8–31
- Earned run average: 3.15
- Strikeouts: 131
- Stats at Baseball Reference

Teams
- St. Louis Browns (1913–1915)

Walter Fred Leverenz (July 21, 1888 – March 19, 1973) was an American Major League Baseball pitcher. Leverenz played for the St. Louis Browns from 1913 to 1915.
