= Bailey, Texas =

- City
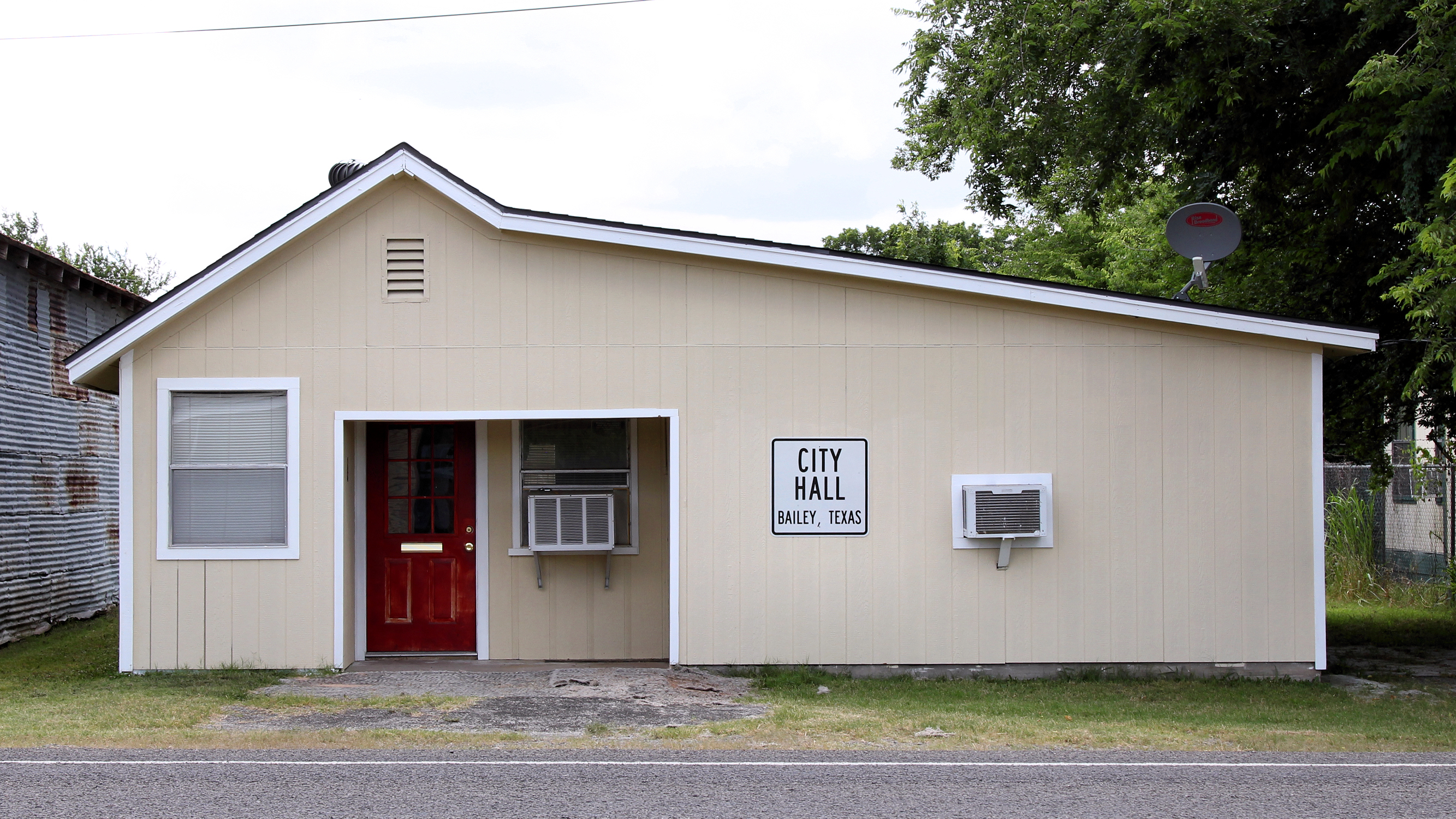
- City Hall
- Interactive map of Bailey, Texas
- Coordinates: 33°26′01″N 96°09′54″W
- Country: United States
- State: Texas
- County: Fannin

Area
  - Total: 0.40 sq mi (1.03 km^{2})
  - Land: 0.40 sq mi (1.03 km^{2})
  - Water: 0 sq mi (0.00 km^{2})
- Elevation: 719 ft (219 m)

Population (2020)
  - Total: 220
  - Density: 550/sq mi (210/km^{2})
- Time zone: UTC-6 (Central (CST))
  - Summer (DST): UTC-5 (CDT)
- ZIP code: 75413
- Area codes: 903, 430
- FIPS code: 48-05264
- GNIS feature ID: 2409769
- Website: cityofbaileytx.com

Bailey is a city in Fannin County, in the U.S. state of Texas. The population was 220 at the 2020 census, down from 289 at the 2010 census.

== History ==
The town began in the late 1850s, when farmers moved into the area to take advantage of the rich soil. Cotton and corn became the principal crops. Two prominent residents competed to have the town named after themselves: Doctors Josiah S. Bailey and A. J. Ray owned land that was to become the townsite. The dispute ended in 1885, when the St. Louis Southwestern Railway used the land donated by Bailey for its right-of-way.

== Geography ==
Bailey is located in southern Fannin County. Texas State Highway 11 passes through the city, leading northwest 15 miles (24 km) to Whitewright and southeast 7 miles (11 km) to Wolfe City. Texas State Highway 78 crosses Highway 11 south of the center of Bailey, leading north 10 miles (16 km) to Bonham, the Fannin County seat, and southwest 6 miles (10 km) to Leonard.

According to the United States Census Bureau, Bailey has a total area of 0.40 square miles (1.03 km^{2}), all land.

== Demographics ==
Historical population
Census	Pop.	Note	%±
1940	223		—
1950	198		−11.2%
1960	176		−11.1%
1970	197		11.9%
1980	185		−6.1%
1990	187		1.1%
2000	213		13.9%
2010	289		35.7%
2020	220		−23.9%
U.S. Decennial Census; 2020 Census

=== 2020 census ===
As of the 2020 census, Bailey had a population of 220. The median age was 39.8 years. 26.4% of residents were under the age of 18 and 17.3% of residents were 65 years of age or older. For every 100 females there were 101.8 males, and for every 100 females age 18 and over there were 97.6 males age 18 and over.

0% of residents lived in urban areas, while 100.0% lived in rural areas.

There were 86 households in Bailey, of which 38.4% had children under the age of 18 living in them. Of all households, 44.2% were married-couple households, 19.8% were households with a male householder and no spouse or partner present, and 30.2% were households with a female householder and no spouse or partner present. About 19.8% of all households were made up of individuals and 7.0% had someone living alone who was 65 years of age or older.

There were 94 housing units, of which 8.5% were vacant. Among occupied housing units, 76.7% were owner-occupied and 23.3% were renter-occupied. The homeowner vacancy rate was 2.9% and the rental vacancy rate was 4.5%.

Racial composition as of the 2020 census
Race	Percent
White	82.3%
Black or African American	0.5%
American Indian and Alaska Native	1.8%
Asian	0.5%
Native Hawaiian and Other Pacific Islander	0%
Some other race	5.0%
Two or more races	10.0%
Hispanic or Latino (of any race)	8.2%

=== 2000 census ===
As of the 2000 census, there were 213 people, 80 households, and 60 families residing in the city. The population density was 532.2 inhabitants per square mile (205.5/km^{2}). There were 98 housing units at an average density of 244.9 per square mile (94.6/km^{2}). The racial makeup of the city was 90.61% White, 0.94% Native American, 0.47% Asian, 4.69% from other races, and 3.29% from two or more races. Hispanic or Latino of any race were 10.80% of the population.

There were 80 households, out of which 40.0% had children under the age of 18 living with them, 57.5% were married couples living together, 8.8% had a female householder with no husband present, and 25.0% were non-families. 23.8% of all households were made up of individuals, and 8.8% had someone living alone who was 65 years of age or older. The average household size was 2.66 and the average family size was 3.15.

In the city, the population was spread out, with 29.1% under the age of 18, 12.2% from 18 to 24, 25.8% from 25 to 44, 23.5% from 45 to 64, and 9.4% who were 65 years of age or older. The median age was 33 years. For every 100 females, there were 102.9 males. For every 100 females age 18 and over, there were 96.1 males.

The median income for a household in the city was $42,292, and the median income for a family was $42,500. Males had a median income of $40,417 versus $25,417 for females. The per capita income for the city was $26,677. About 19.7% of families and 21.4% of the population were below the poverty line, including 36.0% of those under the age of eighteen and 13.3% of those 65 or over.

== Education ==
The City of Bailey is served by the Bonham Independent School District.

== Notable people ==
- Ruby Allmond, singer/songwriter
- Jim Battle, Major League Baseball player
- Roy Leslie, Major League Baseball player
