= Doc Lavan =

American baseball player (1890–1952)

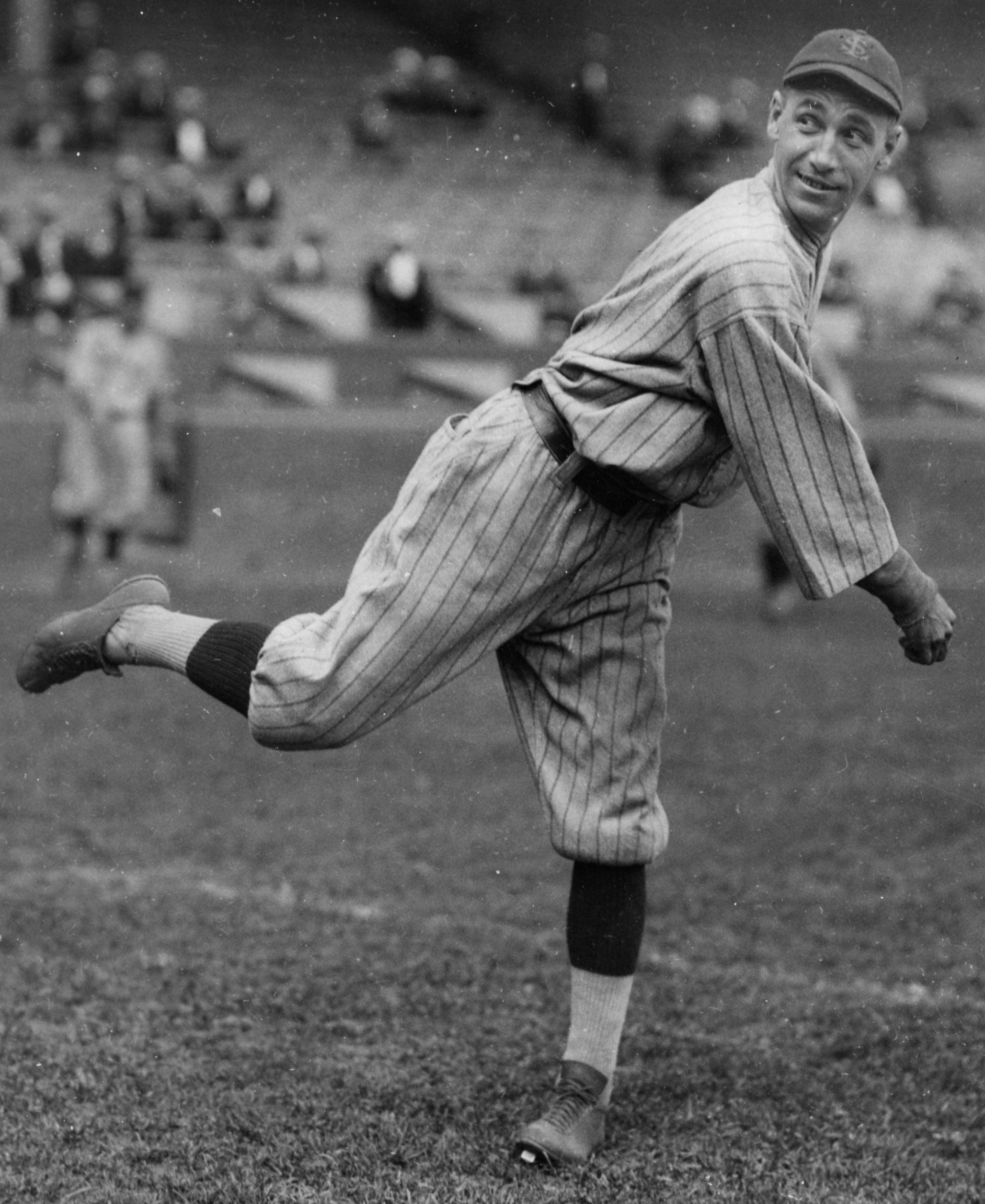
- Shortstop
- Born: October 28, 1890; Grand Rapids, Michigan, U.S.
- Died: May 29, 1952 (aged 61); Detroit, Michigan, U.S.
- Batted: Right Threw: Right

MLB debut
- June 22, 1913, for the St. Louis Browns

Last MLB appearance
- May 4, 1924, for the St. Louis Cardinals

MLB statistics
- Batting average: .245
- Home runs: 7
- Runs batted in: 377
- Stats at Baseball Reference

Teams
- St. Louis Browns (1913); Philadelphia Athletics (1913); St. Louis Browns (1914–1917); Washington Senators (1918); St. Louis Cardinals (1919–1924)

Career highlights and awards
- World Series champion (1913)

John Leonard "Doc" Lavan (October 28, 1890 – May 29, 1952) was an American professional baseball shortstop who played in Major League Baseball (MLB) for the St. Louis Browns, Philadelphia Athletics, Washington Senators, and St. Louis Cardinals. Born in Grand Rapids, Michigan, Lavan attended both Hope College and the University of Michigan from 1908 to 1911 before playing in the major leagues.

Lavan played in 1,163 major league games, of which 1,126 were at the shortstop position. In 11 seasons, Lavan had a lifetime batting average of .245 with 954 hits, 377 RBIs, 338 runs scored, and 186 extra base hits. He had his best season as a batter in 1920 when he hit .289 with 32 extra base hits and 63 RBIs.

Lavan also had good range as a shortstop. His range factor of 5.69 in 1916 was 0.77 points higher than the average shortstop that year. And in 1921, Lavan had 382 putouts, 540 assists, and 88 double plays. He had a tendency to bobble or boot the balls when he got to them. He led American League shortstops in errors four times: 1915 (75), 1918 (57), 1920 (50), and 1921 (49).

In September 1917 (after Lavan committed 75 errors), Browns owner Phil Ball accused his players of lying down on the job. Lavan and second baseman Del Pratt sued Ball for slander, and Lavan was promptly traded to the Senators.

Lavan was known as "Doc" because he was actually a medical doctor. He was a lieutenant surgeon in the U.S. Navy during World War I and also served in World War II. He retired from military service after World War II as a Commander for the Naval Reserve. Lavan was a practicing medical doctor, who also served as a city health officer in New York City, St. Louis, Missouri, Kansas City, Missouri, Toledo, Ohio, Kalamazoo, Michigan, and Grand Rapids, Michigan. He also served as Director of Research for the National Foundation of Infantile Paralysis.

Lavan died in 1952 at Harper Hospital in Detroit, Michigan. He was 61 years old. He was buried at Arlington National Cemetery in Arlington, Virginia.
