= Pete Schmidt (baseball) =

American baseball player (1890–1973)

- Pitcher
- Born: July 23, 1890; Lowden, Iowa, United States
- Died: March 11, 1973 (aged 82); Pembroke, Ontario, Canada
- Batted: Right Threw: Right

MLB debut
- July 14, 1913, for the St. Louis Browns

Last MLB appearance
- July 14, 1913, for the St. Louis Browns

MLB statistics
- Games: 1
- Earned run average: 4.50
- Strikeouts: 0
- Stats at Baseball Reference

Teams
- St. Louis Browns (1913)

Frederich Christopher Herman "Pete" Schmidt (July 23, 1890 – March 11, 1973) was a Major League Baseball pitcher who played for the St. Louis Browns in 1913.
