= Johnny Johnston (baseball) =

American baseball player (1890-1940)

- Left fielder
- Born: March 28, 1890; Longview, Texas, U.S.
- Died: March 7, 1940 (aged 49); San Diego, California, U.S.
- Batted: Left Threw: Right

MLB debut
- April 10, 1913, for the St. Louis Browns

Last MLB appearance
- September 4, 1913, for the St. Louis Browns

MLB statistics
- Batting average: .224
- Home runs: 2
- Runs batted in: 27
- Stats at Baseball Reference

Teams
- St. Louis Browns (1913)

John Thomas Johnston (March 28, 1890 – March 7, 1940) was an American Major League Baseball left fielder who played with the St. Louis Browns in 1913.
