= Frank Mills (baseball) =

American baseball player (1895-1983)

- Catcher
- Born: May 13, 1895; Knoxville, Ohio, U.S.
- Died: August 31, 1983 (aged 88); Youngstown, Ohio, U.S.
- Batted: Left Threw: Right

MLB debut
- September 22, 1914, for the Cleveland Naps

Last MLB appearance
- September 30, 1914, for the Cleveland Naps

MLB statistics
- Batting average: .125
- Home runs: 0
- Runs batted in: 0
- Stats at Baseball Reference

Teams
- Cleveland Naps (1914)

Frank Le Moyne Mills (May 13, 1895 – August 31, 1983) was a Major League Baseball catcher who played for one season. He played for the Cleveland Naps for four games during the 1914 season.
