= Bruce Hartford =

American baseball player (1892-1975)

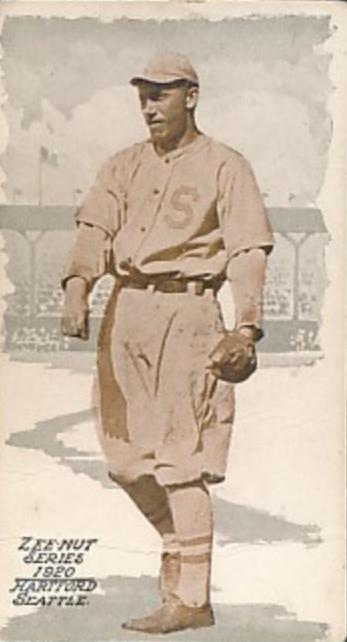
- Shortstop
- Born: May 14, 1892; Chicago, Illinois, U.S.
- Died: May 25, 1975 (aged 83); Los Angeles, California, U.S.
- Batted: Right Threw: Right

MLB debut
- June 3, 1914, for the Cleveland Naps

Last MLB appearance
- June 27, 1914, for the Cleveland Naps

MLB statistics
- Batting average: .182
- Home runs: 0
- Runs batted in: 0
- Stats at Baseball Reference

Teams
- Cleveland Naps (1914)

Bruce Daniel Hartford (May 14, 1892 – May 25, 1975) was an American Major League Baseball shortstop who played for one season. He played in eight games for the Cleveland Naps during the 1914 season.
