= Jimmy Johnston =

American baseball player (1889–1967)

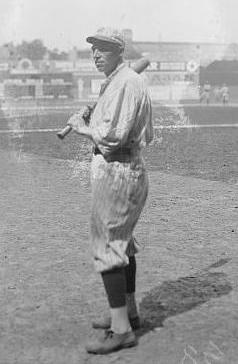
- Infielder / Outfielder
- Born: December 10, 1889; Cleveland, Tennessee, U.S.
- Died: February 14, 1967 (aged 77); Chattanooga, Tennessee, U.S.
- Batted: Right Threw: Right

MLB debut
- May 3, 1911, for the Chicago White Sox

Last MLB appearance
- September 11, 1926, for the New York Giants

MLB statistics
- Batting average: .294
- Home runs: 22
- Runs batted in: 410
- Stats at Baseball Reference

Teams
- Chicago White Sox (1911); Chicago Cubs (1914); Brooklyn Robins (1916–1925); Boston Braves (1926); New York Giants (1926)

James Harle Johnston (December 10, 1889 – February 14, 1967) was an American Major League Baseball player from 1911 to 1926. He played mostly with the Brooklyn Robins of the National League. His brother Doc Johnston was also a major league player.

== Career ==
Johnston, who batted and threw right-handed, made his major-league debut on May 3, 1911, with the Chicago White Sox, which was his only appearance that season. He did not return to the majors until 1914, when he played 50 games with the Chicago Cubs. From 1916 through 1925 he was with the Brooklyn Robins (who later became the Brooklyn Dodgers). He finished up his career the following year, playing for the Boston Braves and the New York Giants. His final major league game was on September 11, 1926.

Overall, Johnston played all or part of 13 seasons in the major leagues, ten with the Brooklyn Robins. He appeared in two World Series, both Brooklyn losses. In the 1916 World Series he started two of the games, batting in the lead-off position. In the 1920 World Series, he appeared in four of the games, mostly batting second except for batting sixth in one of the games. Johnston injured his knee in Game 4 and had to sit out the rest of the series. Jimmy's brother Doc Johnston played against him for the Cleveland Indians in the 1920 World Series, marking the first World Series and first Big Four championship to feature two brothers on opposing teams.

On May 25, 1922, Johnston hit for the cycle as a member of the Brooklyn Robins in an 8–7 win over the Philadelphia Phillies at the Baker Bowl.

During his major league career, Johnston played 448 games at third base, 354 in the outfield, 243 at second, 178 at shortstop, and 49 at first base. He had a .294 lifetime batting average, hitting in the .270 to .280 range near the end of the dead-ball era and going over .300 once the live-ball era started. He stole 169 bases in his major league career, mostly from 1916 to 1923. He had little power, except in 1921 when he had 41 doubles and 14 triples. All of his managers became Hall of Famers; Hugh Duffy with the White Sox, Hank O'Day with the Cubs, Wilbert Robinson with Brooklyn, Dave Bancroft with the Braves, and John McGraw with the Giants.

After his playing career ended, Johnston coached first base for Brooklyn in 1931. He died in Chattanooga, Tennessee, in 1967.

== Family ==
Johnston married Nora Belle Jones (1888–1974) in 1910; the couple had five children.

Johnston's brother Doc Johnston was also a major league player.

== See also ==
- List of Major League Baseball players to hit for the cycle
- List of Major League Baseball career stolen bases leaders

Achievements
Preceded by Ross Youngs	Hitting for the cycle May 25, 1922	Succeeded by Ray Schalk
