= Tod Sloan (baseball) =

American baseball player

- Catcher
- Born: December 24, 1890; Madisonville, Tennessee, U.S.
- Died: September 12, 1956 (aged 65); Akron, Ohio, U.S.
- Batted: Left Threw: Right

MLB debut
- September 22, 1913, for the St. Louis Browns

Last MLB appearance
- July 10, 1919, for the St. Louis Browns

MLB statistics
- Batting average: .234
- Home runs: 2
- Runs batted in: 33
- Stats at Baseball Reference

Teams
- St. Louis Browns (1913, 1917, 1919)

Yale Yeastman "Tod" Sloan (December 24, 1890 – September 12, 1956) was an American outfielder for the St. Louis Browns in parts of three seasons (1913, 1917 and 1919).

Sloan played in 143 games and had 402 At Bats, 43 Runs, 94 Hits, 8 Doubles, 5 Triples, 2 Home Runs, 33 RBI, 9 Stolen Bases, 41 Walks, .234 Batting Average, .319 On-base percentage, .294 Slugging Percentage, 118 Total Bases and 7 Sacrifice Hits.

Sloan died in Akron, Ohio, at the age of 65.

== Sources ==
- Career statistics from Baseball Reference · Retrosheet · Baseball Almanac
