= Eddie Edmonson =

American baseball player (1889–1971)

- First baseman/Outfielder
- Born: November 20, 1889; Hopewell, Pennsylvania, U.S.
- Died: May 10, 1971 (aged 81); Leesburg, Florida, U.S.
- Batted: Left Threw: Right

MLB debut
- October 4, 1913, for the Cleveland Naps

Last MLB appearance
- October 5, 1913, for the Cleveland Naps

MLB statistics
- Batting average: .000
- Home runs: 0
- Runs batted in: 0
- Stats at Baseball Reference

Teams
- Cleveland Naps (1913)

Eddie Edmonson (November 20, 1889 – May 10, 1971) was an American Major League Baseball player who played for one season. Earl Edward Edmonson was born on November 20, 1889, in Hopewell, Pennsylvania. At the age of 23, Edmonson joined the Cleveland Naps during the 1913 Cleveland Naps season and played in his first Major League Baseball game on October 4 of that year. A little more than a month later, Edmonson played in his second and final game on October 5, 1913. Nicknamed "Axel", Edmonson played one game as a first baseman and the other game as an outfielder. During his two-game career, Edmonson made it to bat five times, but went 0 for 5 and ended up with a .000 hitting average, despite his ability to throw right and bat left. Edmonson died at the age of 81 in Leesburg, Florida, on May 10, 1971. He is buried at Greenwood Cemetery in Orlando, Florida.
