= Josh Swindell =

American baseball player

- Pitcher
- Born: July 5, 1885; Rose Hill, Kansas
- Died: March 19, 1969 (aged 83); Fruita, Colorado
- Batted: Right Threw: Right

MLB debut
- September 16, 1911, for the Cleveland Naps

Last MLB appearance
- June 15, 1913, for the Cleveland Naps

MLB statistics
- Win–loss record: 0–1
- Earned run average: 2.08
- Strikeouts: 6
- Stats at Baseball Reference

Teams
- Cleveland Naps (1911, 1913)

Joshua Ernest Swindell (July 5, 1883 – March 19, 1969) was a Major League Baseball pitcher who played in parts of two seasons. He pitched in four games for the Cleveland Naps during the 1911 Cleveland Naps season, and made an appearance as a pinch hitter during the 1913 Cleveland Naps season.
