= Dave Gregg =

American baseball player (1891-1965)

- Pitcher
- Born: March 14, 1891; Chehalis, Washington
- Died: November 12, 1965 (aged 74); Clarkston, Washington
- Batted: Right Threw: Right

MLB debut
- June 15, 1913, for the Cleveland Naps

Last MLB appearance
- June 15, 1913, for the Cleveland Naps

MLB statistics
- Win–loss record: 0–0
- Earned run average: 18.00
- Strikeouts: 0
- Stats at Baseball Reference

Teams
- Cleveland Naps (1913)

David Charles Gregg (March 14, 1891 – November 12, 1965), nicknamed "Highpockets", was a Major League Baseball pitcher who played for one season. He pitched an inning of one game for the Cleveland Naps during the 1913 Cleveland Naps season. He was the brother of teammate Vean Gregg.
