= Larry Pezold =

American baseball player (1893-1957)

- Third baseman
- Born: June 22, 1893; New Orleans, Louisiana, U.S.
- Died: October 22, 1957 (aged 64); Baton Rouge, Louisiana, U.S.
- Batted: Right Threw: Right

MLB debut
- July 27, 1914, for the Cleveland Naps

Last MLB appearance
- September 30, 1914, for the Cleveland Naps

MLB statistics
- Batting average: .225
- Home runs: 0
- Runs batted in: 5
- Stats at Baseball Reference

Teams
- Cleveland Naps (1914)

Lorenz Johannes Pezold (June 22, 1893 – October 22, 1957) was an American Major League Baseball third baseman who played in 23 games for the Cleveland Naps during the 1914 season.

Pezold was traded to the Nashville Vols for Rube Kroh before the 1917 season but quit the team before the season began. The Daily Arkansas Gazette reported that Pezold declined to play in Tennessee because it was a dry state.
