= Jack Powell (pitcher, born 1891) =

American baseball player (1891-1930)

- Pitcher
- Born: August 17, 1891; Holcomb, Missouri, U.S.
- Died: March 12, 1930 (aged 38); Memphis, Tennessee, U.S.
- Batted: Unknown Threw: Right

MLB debut
- June 14, 1913, for the St. Louis Browns

Last MLB appearance
- July 9, 1913, for the St. Louis Browns

MLB statistics
- Games: 2
- Earned run average: 0.00
- Innings pitched: 2.0
- Stats at Baseball Reference

Teams
- St. Louis Browns (1913)

Reginald Bertrand "Jack" Powell (August 17, 1891 – March 12, 1930) was an American professional baseball pitcher who played for the St. Louis Browns in Major League Baseball in 1913. He appeared in two games and pitched an inning in each, allowing three runs (none earned), one hit, and two walks. Powell choked to death in 1930, when he was 38, after attempting to swallow one half of a steak in a Memphis café.
