= Jim Battle (baseball) =

American baseball player (1901–1965)

- Third baseman / Shortstop
- Born: March 26, 1901; Bailey, Texas, U.S.
- Died: September 30, 1965 (aged 64); Chico, California, U.S.
- Batted: Right Threw: Right

MLB debut
- September 9, 1927, for the Chicago White Sox

Last MLB appearance
- October 2, 1927, for the Chicago White Sox

MLB statistics
- Batting average: .375
- Games Played: 8
- Hits: 3
- Stats at Baseball Reference

Teams
- Chicago White Sox (1927)

James Milton Battle (March 26, 1901 – September 30, 1965) was an American reserve infielder in Major League Baseball. Listed at 6 ft 1 in (1.85 m), 170 lb., he batted and threw right-handed.

A native of Bailey, Texas, Battle played briefly for the Chicago White Sox during the 1927 season as a backup for third baseman Willie Kamm and shortstop Roger Peckinpaugh. In a six-game majors career, Battle was a .375 (3-for-8) hitter with one triple and one run scored without home runs or RBI. He also spent parts of seven seasons in the Minor leagues with the Longview Cannibals (1924-'25), Paris Bearcats (1925-'26), Little Rock Travelers (1927), Seattle Indians (1928), Waco Cubs (1928-'29) and Dallas Steers (1929), registering a .286 average (737-for-2573) with 23 homers in 594 game appearances.

Battle died in Chico, California, at the age of 64.
