= Al Tedrow =

American baseball player (1891-1958)

- Pitcher
- Born: December 14, 1891; Westerville, Ohio, U.S.
- Died: January 23, 1958 (aged 66); Westerville, Ohio, U.S.
- Batted: Right Threw: Left

MLB debut
- September 15, 1914, for the Cleveland Naps

Last MLB appearance
- September 27, 1914, for the Cleveland Naps

MLB statistics
- Win–loss record: 1-2
- Strikeouts: 4
- Earned run average: 1.21
- Stats at Baseball Reference

Teams
- Cleveland Naps (1914)

Allen Seymour Tedrow (December 14, 1891 – January 23, 1958) was an American Major League Baseball pitcher. He pitched in four games for the Cleveland Naps in 1914. Although he had an impressive ERA of 1.21 (against a league average of 2.87) in 22 1/3 innings, he never pitched in the majors after that.

== Sources ==
- Career statistics from Baseball Reference · Baseball Reference (Minors) · Retrosheet · Baseball Almanac
