= Curtis Brown (outfielder) =

American baseball player (born 1945)

- Left fielder
- Born: September 14, 1945 (age 80); Sacramento, California, U.S.
- Batted: Right Threw: Right

MLB debut
- May 27, 1973, for the Montreal Expos

Last MLB appearance
- May 27, 1973, for the Montreal Expos

MLB statistics
- Games played: 1
- At bats: 4
- Hits: 0
- Stats at Baseball Reference

Teams
- Montreal Expos (1973)

Curtis Brown (born September 14, 1945) is an American former professional baseball player. Although his professional career lasted for 16 seasons (1965–1978 and 1980–1981, including Mexican League service), he played only one game of Major League Baseball as the starting left fielder for the Montreal Expos on May 27, 1973. Facing the San Francisco Giants' Ron Bryant at Candlestick Park, Brown went hitless in four at bats and played errorless ball in the field, recording two putouts, as the Giants won, 6–3. Brown then spent the rest of the season, and his career, in minor league baseball at the Triple-A level.

Brown threw and batted right-handed; he stood 5 feet 11 inches (1.80 m) tall and weighed 180 pounds (82 kg). Signed as an amateur free agent by the New York Mets in 1965, he spent seven seasons in the Mets' farm system before being traded to Montreal in December 1971. His brother, Leon Brown, was also a Major League outfielder, appearing in 64 games played for the 1976 Mets.
