= Leon Brown (baseball) =

American baseball player (born 1948)

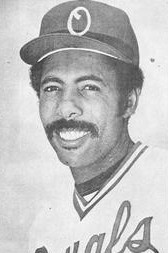
- Brown with the Omaha Royals in 1980
- Outfielder
- Born: November 16, 1948 (age 76); Sacramento, California, U.S.
- Batted: Right Threw: Right

MLB debut
- May 19, 1976, for the New York Mets

Last MLB appearance
- October 3, 1976, for the New York Mets

MLB statistics
- Batting average: .214
- Home runs: 0
- Runs batted in: 2

Teams
- New York Mets (1976)

Leon Brown (born November 16, 1948) is an American former professional baseball outfielder. He played in Major League Baseball for the New York Mets in 1976. He is the brother of Curtis Brown.

== Career ==
Brown was drafted by the Baltimore Orioles in the 1966 Major League Baseball draft out of Grant Union High School in Sacramento, California. He then went on to spend thirteen years in professional baseball, mostly in the minor leagues. Brown had 74 plate appearances in 64 games as a New York Met in 1976, recording a .214 batting average as an outfielder. He was traded with Brock Pemberton from the Mets to the St. Louis Cardinals for minor league first baseman Ed Kurpiel on December 9, 1976.

Brown also played winter baseball in the Mexican Pacific League for five seasons with the Yaquis de Obregón, Ostioneros de Guaymas and Tomateros de Culiacán.

== Personal life ==
His son, Channing Brown, has played for various collegiate and professional baseball teams including Chandler-Gilbert Community College, Lipscomb University, San Diego Surf Dawgs, Team Canada, Lake County Fielders, and the Prescott Montezuma Federals.
