= Red Barkley =

American baseball player (1912-2000)

- Infielder
- Born: September 19, 1912; Childress, Texas, U.S.
- Died: December 12, 2000 (aged 88); Waco, Texas, U.S.
- Batted: Right Threw: Right

MLB debut
- September 2, 1937, for the St. Louis Browns

Last MLB appearance
- August 14, 1943, for the Brooklyn Dodgers

MLB statistics
- AVG.: .264
- HR: 0
- R: 21
- Stats at Baseball Reference

Teams
- St. Louis Browns (1937); Boston Bees (1939); Brooklyn Dodgers (1943)

John Duncan "Red" Barkley (September 19, 1912 – December 12, 2000) was an American backup infielder in Major League Baseball (MLB) who played for the St. Louis Browns, the Boston Bees and the Brooklyn Dodgers. In a three-season career, Barkley was a .264 hitter with no home runs and 21 runs batted in in 63 games played. He is the grandfather of Brian Barkley, who pitched with the Boston Red Sox.

Barkley died in Waco, Texas, at the age of 88.
