= Boyd Cypert =

American athlete, businessman, and politician

Alfred Boyd Cypert JD

Arkansas Sixth Judicial District Attorney
- In office 1926–1931
- Deputy: Carl Edward Bailey
- Succeeded by: Carl Edward Bailey
- Constituency: Pulaski and Perry County, Arkansas

Personal details
- Born: August 8, 1889 Little Rock, Arkansas, U.S.
- Died: January 9, 1973 (aged 83) Washington, D.C., U.S.
- Resting place: National Memorial Park
- Party: Democratic Party
- Spouse: Blanche Cypert
- Education: University of Arkansas, Harvard Law School
- Profession: Baseball player, lawyer

Military service
- Branch/service: United States Army
- Battles/wars: World War I

Alfred Boyd Cypert (August 8, 1889 – January 9, 1973) was an American professional baseball player, lawyer, Democratic Party politician and business manager. Cypert was born in Little Rock, Arkansas, and attended the University of Arkansas where he played baseball and football for the Razorbacks. He enrolled in Harvard Law School in 1912 and graduated in 1913. In 1914, he played one game with the Major League Baseball (MLB) Cleveland Naps. After his baseball career was over, Cypert served as the district attorney in Little Rock and in 1931 ran an unsuccessful bid for Arkansas Attorney General against four-term incumbent Hal Norwood. Later in his life, Cypert served as the business manager of the University of Arkansas' athletic department.

== Early life and baseball career ==
Boyd Cypert
- Third baseman
- Born: August 8, 1889; Little Rock, Arkansas
- Died: January 9, 1973 (aged 83); Washington, D.C.
- Batted: Right Threw: Right

MLB debut
- June 27, 1914, for the Cleveland Naps

Last MLB appearance
- June 27, 1914, for the Cleveland Naps

MLB statistics
- At-bats: 1
- Hits: 0
- Stats at Baseball Reference

Teams
- Cleveland Naps (1914)

Alfred Boyd Cypert was born on August 8, 1889, in Little Rock, Arkansas, to Thomas and Bessie Cypert of Arkansas and Tennessee, respectively. In 1900, Thomas Cypert was working as a grocery store clerk in Little Rock. By 1910, Thomas Cypert found work as a real estate agent. Boyd Cypert had one sibling, his brother Thomas Cypert, Jr. In 1910, Boyd Cypert enrolled at the University of Arkansas in Fayetteville, Arkansas. While at the University of Arkansas, he was a member of Xi chapter of Kappa Sigma fraternity. While at school, he played third base for the Arkansas Razorbacks baseball team. He also was the quarterback for the Arkansas Razorbacks football for three years (1910–12).

In 1912, Cypert enrolled at Harvard Law School in Cambridge, Massachusetts. He graduated in 1913. Cypert signed a professional baseball contract in 1913. He played his first and only professional game on June 27, 1914, as a member of the Major League Baseball (MLB) Cleveland Naps. According to one sports historian, Cypert was the very first player in the major leagues from Little Rock. In that game, he struck out once in one at-bat. Defensively, Cypert played third base. During World War I, Cypert served in the United States Army and later received an honorable discharge. In 1921, Cypret was a pitcher for the Arkansas Razorbacks alumni baseball team.

== Law and political career ==
By 1920, Cypert worked as a general practice lawyer in Little Rock, Arkansas. In late-January 1922, Cypert was nominated for the position of district attorney in Little Rock. However, it was not until 1926 when Cypert was elected Arkansas Sixth Judicial District Attorney. His constituency covered Pulaski and Perry County, Arkansas. His deputy district attorney was Carl Edward Bailey, who would later go-on to be the Governor of Arkansas. In 1928, Cypert prosecuted Charles Smith, the president of Advancement of Atheism, on blasphemy charges after he was distributing pamphlets which read: "Evolution is true; the Bible is a lie; and God is a ghost".

In November 1928, after the State of Arkansas passed a law banning the teaching of evolution, Cypert stated that he was not going to hunt down offenders, instead that he was going to enforce the law when asked to do so. In 1929, Cypert prosecuted Reece A. Claude, the state railroad commissioner, on bribery charges after investigating a bill in the Arkansas Legislature which Claude allegedly attempted to pay state officials to pass. In 1931, Cypert ran for Arkansas Attorney General against Hal Norwood, who previously held the office. Cypert eventually lost the race. He was succeeded at his position of Arkansas Sixth Judicial District Attorney by Carl Edward Bailey.

== Later life ==
By 1930, Cypert was living in Little Rock, Arkansas with his wife, Blanch Cypert and their daughter, Belly. Boyd Cypert was hired as the University of Arkansas' business manager in 1934. In 1936, Cypert considered running for Arkansas Attorney General again. He died on January 9, 1973, at the age of 83 in Washington, D.C.
