= Charlie Beamon =

American baseball player (1934–2016)

- Pitcher
- Born: December 25, 1934; Oakland, California, U.S.
- Died: May 3, 2016 (aged 81); San Leandro, California, U.S.
- Batted: Right Threw: Right

MLB debut
- September 26, 1956, for the Baltimore Orioles

Last MLB appearance
- September 13, 1958, for the Baltimore Orioles

MLB statistics
- Win–loss record: 3–3
- Earned run average: 3.91
- Strikeouts: 45
- Stats at Baseball Reference

Teams
- Baltimore Orioles (1956–1958)

Charles Alfonzo Beamon (December 25, 1934 – May 3, 2016) was an American pitcher in Major League Baseball who played for the Baltimore Orioles from 1956 to 1958. Listed at 5' 11", 195 lb., he batted and threw right handed.

Beamon was born in Oakland, California, where he graduated from McClymonds High School. He made his debut with the Orioles in September 1956, pitching a four-hit, 1–0 shutout against the New York Yankees at Memorial Stadium. He did strike out nine batters in the process, including Billy Martin three times.

Beamon played from 1953 through 1961 for eight different teams in nine Minor League seasons, going 89–69 with a 3.76 ERA in 226 pitching appearances. Charlie Metro was his manager on the 1957-1959 Vancouver Mounties and had this to say about him: "He had to be, in my assessment, one of the finest pitching athletes I've had. I've had quite a few that I could put in that category. Charlie Beamon could do everything. He was strong as an ox. He could run, and he could swing a bat.... Beamon was a tremendous athlete and should have been a good big league pitcher. He won for us out there. It's a mystery why he didn't do better in the majors."

In between, Beamon played winter ball with the Leones del Caracas club of the Venezuelan Winter League in the 1957–1958 season. He posted a 9–6 record with 55 strikeouts and a 2.49 ERA in 130 innings, leading the league in ERA, while tying with Magallanes' Ramón Monzant for the most wins.

His son, Charlie Beamon, Jr., played first base for the Seattle Mariners and Toronto Blue Jays in part of three Major League seasons spanning 1978–1981.

Beamon Sr. died in 2016 in San Leandro, California, at the age of 81.
