= George Young (baseball) =

American baseball player (1890-1950)

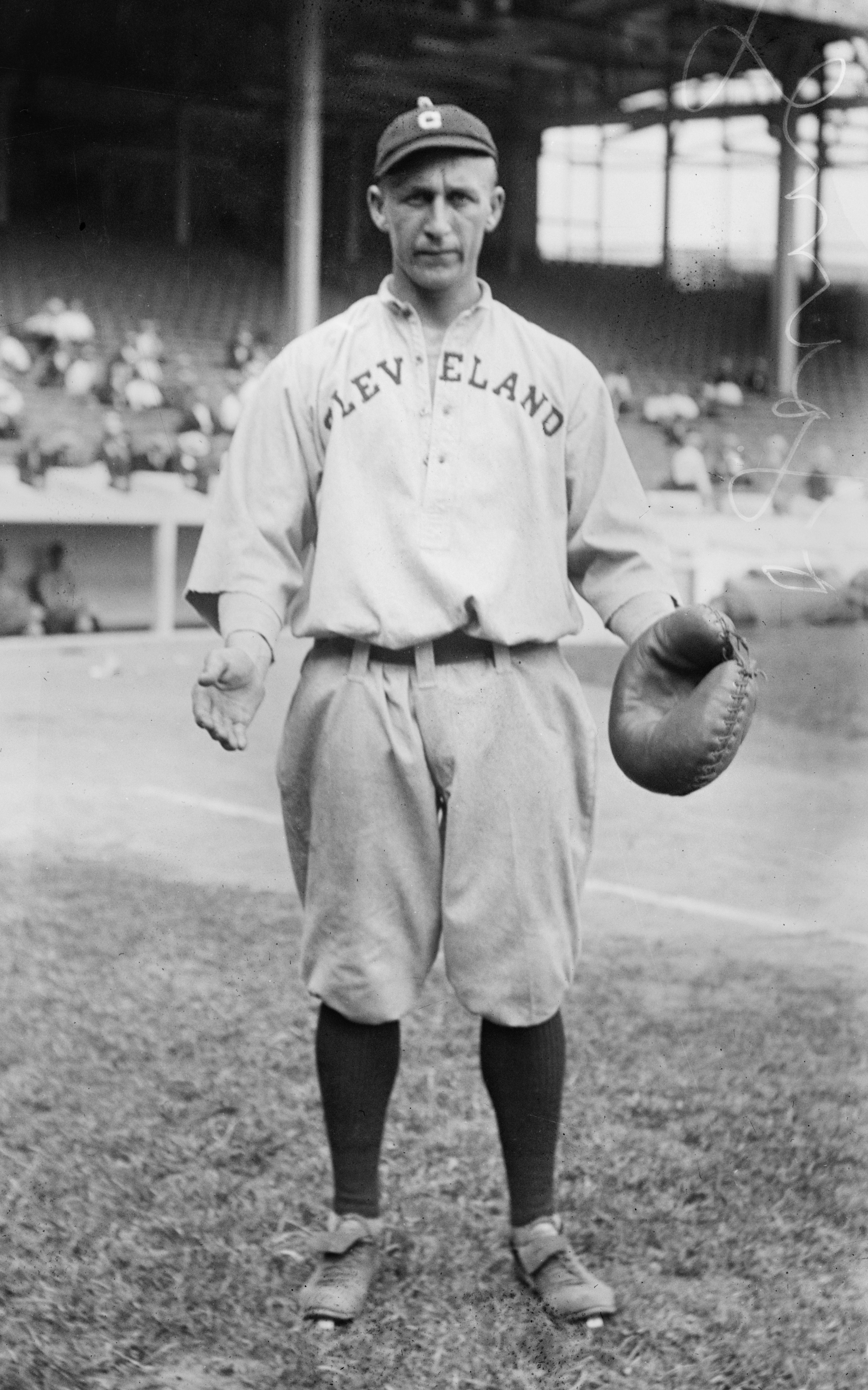
- Pinch hitter
- Born: April 1, 1890; Brooklyn, New York
- Died: March 13, 1950 (aged 60); Brightwaters, New York
- Batted: Left Threw: Right

MLB debut
- August 10, 1913, for the Cleveland Naps

Last MLB appearance
- August 15, 1913, for the Cleveland Naps

MLB statistics
- Batting average: .000
- Games played: 2
- At bats: 2
- Stats at Baseball Reference

Teams
- Cleveland Naps (1913)

George Joseph Young (April 1, 1890 – March 13, 1950) was a professional baseball player. He played two games in Major League Baseball for the Cleveland Naps in 1913, both as a pinch hitter. He played two seasons of minor league baseball for the Charleston Senators of the Ohio State League, where he was primarily a catcher.

== Sources ==
- Career statistics from Baseball Reference, or Baseball Reference (Minors)
