= Charlie Beamon Jr. =

American baseball player (born 1953)

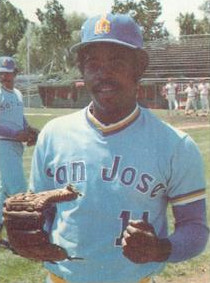
- First baseman / Designated hitter
- Born: December 4, 1953 (age 72); Oakland, California, U.S.
- Batted: Left Threw: Left

MLB debut
- September 11, 1978, for the Seattle Mariners

Last MLB appearance
- September 22, 1981, for the Toronto Blue Jays

MLB statistics
- Batting average: .196
- Home runs: 0
- Runs batted in: 0
- Stats at Baseball Reference

Teams
- Seattle Mariners (1978–1979); Toronto Blue Jays (1981)

Charles Alfonzo Beamon Jr. (born December 4, 1953) is an American former first baseman and designated hitter in Major League Baseball. Beamon spent parts of three seasons in the majors with the Seattle Mariners and Toronto Blue Jays.

Beamon grew up in Oakland, California and attended McClymonds High School. His batting average topped .500 his final three years of high school. He then attended Laney College. He signed with the Kansas City Royals out of college, beginning his minor league career in 1974. He was a Midwest League All-Star in 1975. He played in Double-A in 1976. After that season, the Mariners selected him in the Rule 5 draft. He reached Triple-A in 1977.

Beamon made his MLB debut with the Mariners in September 1978, batting 2-for-11. He played in a career-high 27 MLB games in 1979, batting. 200 with one double. The Blue Jays purchased Beamon's contract in January 1980. He returned to the majors in September 1981, again batting .200 with a double. He played on Triple-A again in 1982, then with Piratas de Campeche in the Mexican Baseball League in 1983, batting .296 in his final professional season.

Beamon's father, Charlie Beamon, was a pitcher with the Baltimore Orioles in the 1950s.

== See also ==
- List of second generation MLB players
