= Paul Carter (1910s pitcher) =

American baseball player (1894–1984)

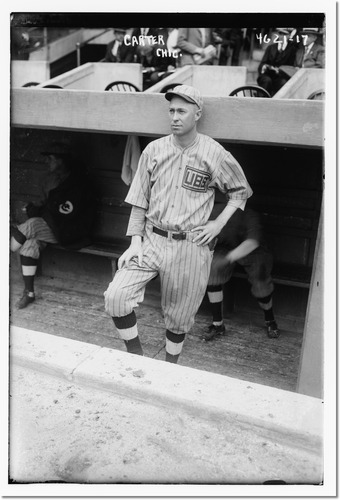
- Pitcher
- Born: May 1, 1894; Lake Park, Georgia, U.S.
- Died: September 11, 1984 (aged 90); Lake Park, Georgia, U.S.
- Batted: Left Threw: Right

MLB debut
- September 15, 1914, for the Cleveland Naps

Last MLB appearance
- September 20, 1920, for the Chicago Cubs

MLB statistics
- Win–loss record: 20-26
- Earned run average: 3.32
- Strikeouts: 115
- Stats at Baseball Reference

Teams
- Cleveland Naps/Indians (1914–1915); Chicago Cubs (1916–1920)

Paul Warren Carter (May 1, 1894 - September 11, 1984) was an American Major League Baseball pitcher from 1914 to 1920. Carter was nicknamed "Nick".

== Sources ==
- Career statistics from Baseball Reference · Baseball Reference (Minors) · Retrosheet · Baseball Almanac
