= Joe Birmingham =

American baseball player and manager (1884–1946)

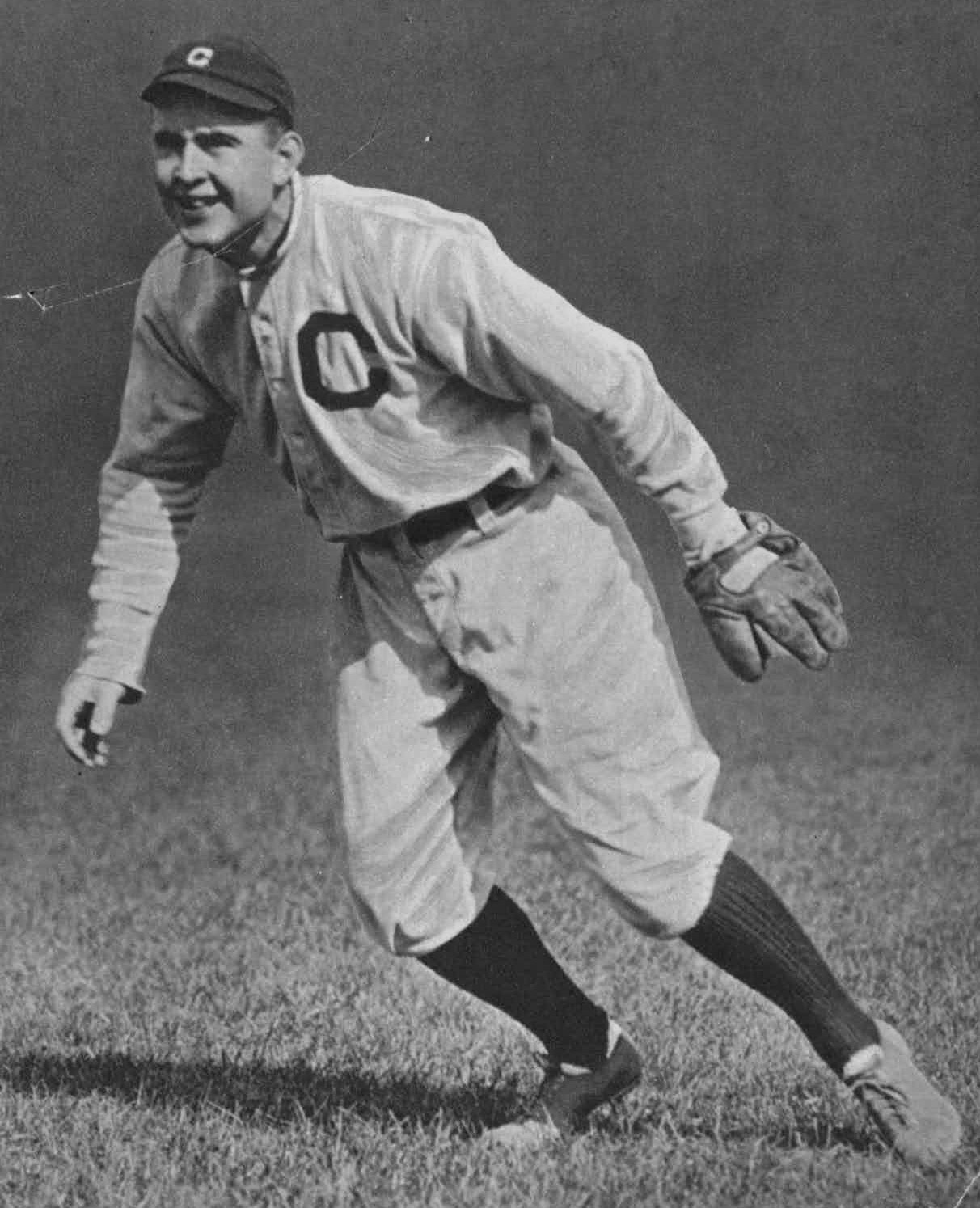
- Birmingham with the Cleveland Naps in 1913
- Center fielder / Manager
- Born: December 3, 1884; Elmira, New York, U.S.
- Died: April 24, 1946 (aged 61); Tampico, Tamaulipas, Mexico

MLB debut
- September 12, 1906, for the Cleveland Naps

Last MLB appearance
- June 25, 1914, for the Cleveland Naps

MLB statistics
- Batting average: .253
- Home runs: 7
- Runs batted in: 265
- Managerial record: 170–191
- Winning %: .471
- Stats at Baseball Reference

Teams
- As player: Cleveland Naps (1906–1914); As manager: Cleveland Naps (1912–1915)

Joseph Leo Birmingham (December 3, 1884 – April 24, 1946) was an American Major League Baseball player. Birmingham was a center fielder and manager who occasionally played the infield for the Cleveland Naps. He was named the manager of the Naps in 1912 at the age of 28 after Harry Davis was fired, and he stayed at the helm for three more seasons.

His tenure was marked with a bit of controversy in 1913 which would be his best finish as manager (86–66, 3rd place). Nap Lajoie, who was Birmingham's former manager, struggled through a hitting slump in mid-season and Birmingham decided to bench the future Hall of Famer at one point. Lajoie who had no love for Birmingham was outraged and cursed out the young manager to his face and in the press. The feud only ended when Lajoie was sold back to Philadelphia after the 1914 season.

His next season would be a disaster, as the newly named Indians lost 102 games, and in 1915, he was fired after only 28 games. He managed the Toronto Maple Leafs of the International League in 1916, but was replaced late in the season.

Birmingham was working in Mexico as an umpire when he died of a heart attack on April 24, 1946.

== Managerial record ==
Team	Year	Regular season					Postseason			
Team	Year	Games	Won	Lost	Win %	Finish	Won	Lost	Win %	Result
CLE	1912	28	21	7	.750	Interim	–	–	–	
CLE	1913	152	86	66	.566	3rd in AL	–	–	–	
CLE	1914	153	51	102	.333	8th in AL	–	–	–	
CLE	1915	28	12	16	.429	Fired	–	–	–	
Total		361	170	191	.471		0	0	–	

== See also ==
- List of Major League Baseball player–managers
