= Brian Barkley =

American baseball player (born 1975)

- Pitcher
- Born: December 8, 1975 (age 50); Conroe, Texas
- Batted: Left Threw: Left

MLB debut
- May 28, 1998, for the Boston Red Sox

Last MLB appearance
- September 27, 1998, for the Boston Red Sox

MLB statistics
- Win–loss record: 0–0
- Earned run average: 9.82
- Innings pitched: 11
- Stats at Baseball Reference

Teams
- Boston Red Sox (1998)

Brian Edward Barkley (born December 8, 1975) is an American former professional baseball player. The 6 ft 2 in (1.88 m), 180 lb (82 kg) left-hander was a relief pitcher in Major League Baseball who worked in six games pitched for the Boston Red Sox in the 1998 season.

== Biography ==
Barkley was born in Conroe, Texas and graduated from Midway High School in Waco, Texas. He was drafted by the Red Sox in the fifth round of the 1994 Major League Baseball draft, and played his first game on May 28, 1998.

In his one-season career, Barkley posted an 0–0 record with two strikeouts, 16 hits allowed (including two home runs and nine bases on balls in 11 innings pitched).

Barkley is the grandson of Red Barkley, who played for the St. Louis Browns, Boston Bees and Brooklyn Dodgers between 1937 and 1943.

Barkley graduated from the Texas College of Osteopathic Medicine in 2013 and completed his residency at the Scott & White Pediatrics Residency Program located in Temple, Texas.

== See also ==
- Boston Red Sox all-time roster
