= Charlie Flannigan (baseball) =

American baseball player (1891-1930)

- Outfielder/Third Baseman
- Born: December 31, 1891; Oakland, California
- Died: January 8, 1930 (aged 38); San Francisco, California
- Batted: Right Threw: Right

MLB debut
- July 9, 1913, for the St. Louis Browns

Last MLB appearance
- August 5, 1913, for the St. Louis Browns

MLB statistics
- Batting average: .000
- Home runs: 0
- Runs batted in: 0

Teams
- St. Louis Browns (1913)

Charles Joseph Flannigan (also Flanagan) (1891–1930) was a professional baseball player. He played for the St. Louis Browns in 1913.
