= Henry Benn =

American baseball player (1890–1967)

- Pitcher
- Born: January 25, 1890; Viola, Wisconsin, U.S.
- Died: June 4, 1967 (aged 77); Madison, Wisconsin, U.S.
- Batted: Right Threw: Right

MLB debut
- September 24, 1914, for the Cleveland Naps

Last MLB appearance
- September 24, 1914, for the Cleveland Naps

MLB statistics
- Win–loss record: 0-0
- Earned run average: 0.00
- Strikeouts: 1
- Stats at Baseball Reference

Teams
- Cleveland Naps (1914)

Henry Omer Benn (January 25, 1890 – June 4, 1967) was an American Major League Baseball player who played in one game for the Cleveland Naps in 1914. He was born in Viola, Wisconsin and died in Madison, Wisconsin.
