= Lynn Brenton =

American baseball player (1889–1968)

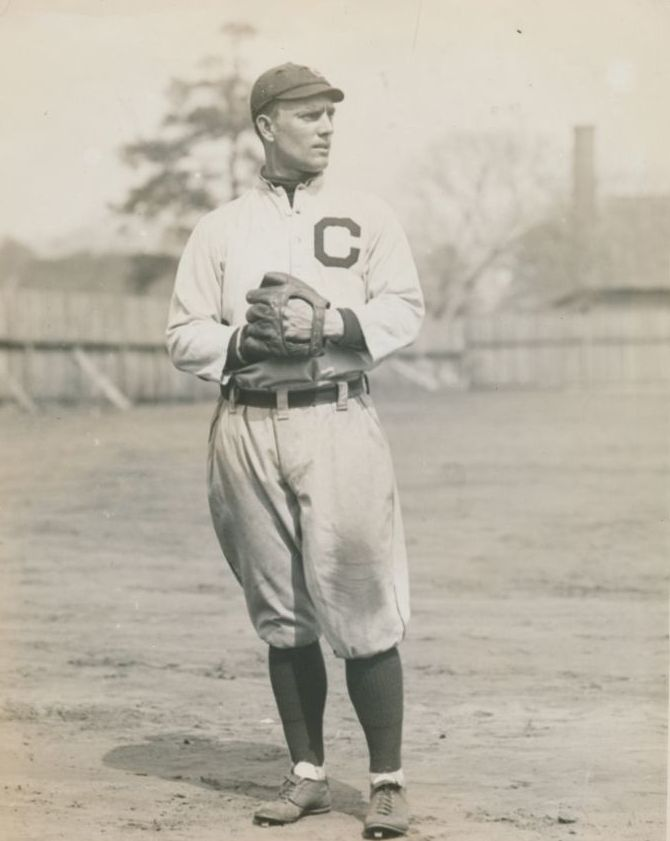
- Pitcher
- Born: October 7, 1889; Peoria, Illinois, U.S.
- Died: October 14, 1968 (aged 79); Los Angeles, California, U.S.
- Batted: Right Threw: Right

MLB debut
- August 10, 1913, for the Cleveland Naps

Last MLB appearance
- July 4, 1921, for the Cincinnati Reds

MLB statistics
- Win–loss record: 5–12
- Earned run average: 3.97
- Strikeouts: 52
- Stats at Baseball Reference

Teams
- Cleveland Naps/Indians (1913, 1915); Cincinnati Reds (1921)

Lynn Davis Brenton (October 7, 1889 – October 14, 1968) was an American Major League Baseball pitcher who played for four seasons. He played for the Cleveland Indians in 1913 and 1915 and the Cincinnati Reds from 1920 to 1921.
