= Ray Bates =

American baseball player (1890-1970)

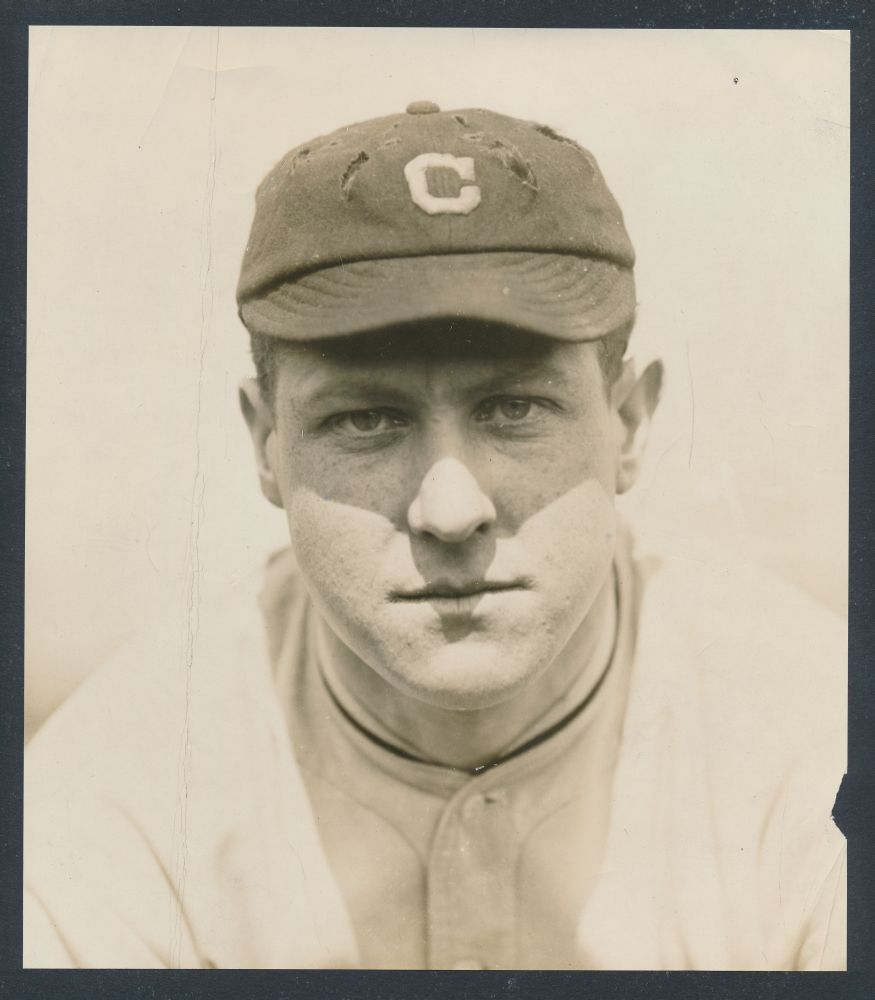
- Third baseman
- Born: February 8, 1890; Paterson, New Jersey, U.S.
- Died: August 15, 1970 (aged 80); Tucson, Arizona, U.S.
- Batted: Right Threw: Right

MLB debut
- May 31, 1913, for the Cleveland Naps

Last MLB appearance
- September 24, 1917, for the Philadelphia Athletics

MLB statistics
- Batting average: .233
- Home runs: 2
- Runs batted in: 70
- Stats at Baseball Reference

Teams
- Cleveland Naps (1913); Philadelphia Athletics (1917)

Raymond Bates (February 8, 1890 – August 15, 1970) was an American Major League Baseball third baseman who played for two seasons. He played for the Cleveland Naps in 1913 and the Philadelphia Athletics in 1917.

== Minor Leagues ==
Bates made his professional debut with Altoona, a Class B level team in the Tri-State League, in 1911. During his career he also played with Newport News, a Class C team in the Virginia League, in 1912; Cleveland, a AA team in the American Association, in 1914; Portland, a Class AA team in the Pacific Coast League, in 1915; Vernon, a Class AA team in the Pacific Coast League, in 1916; Los Angeles, a Class AA team in the Pacific Coast League, in 1919; Seattle, a Class AA team in the Pacific Coast League, in 1921; Oklahoma City and Omaha, both Class A teams of the Western League, in 1922; and finished his career with Reading, a Class AA team of the International League, in 1923. Bates had his best hitting season in 1921 hitting .338.

== Major Leagues ==
Bates played in 27 games for the Cleveland Naps during the 1914 season hitting .167 with two triples, four RBI's, and three stolen bases. He would return to the major leagues in a more regular role with the Philadelphia Athletics in 1917, playing in 127 games hitting .237 with two home runs, twenty doubles, seven triples, sixty-six RBI's, and twelve stolen bases.

== Post-playing career ==
In 1926 Bates was one of three managers of the Ogden Gunners, a Class C Utah-Idaho League.
