= Lloyd Bishop =

American baseball player (1890–1968)

- Pitcher
- Born: April 25, 1890; Conway Springs, Kansas, U.S.
- Died: June 18, 1968 (aged 78); Wichita, Kansas, U.S.
- Batted: Right Threw: Right

MLB debut
- September 5, 1914, for the Cleveland Naps

Last MLB appearance
- September 14, 1914, for the Cleveland Naps

MLB statistics
- Win–loss record: 0-1
- Earned run average: 5.63
- Strikeouts: 1
- Stats at Baseball Reference

Teams
- Cleveland Naps (1914)

Lloyd Clifton Bishop (April 25, 1890 – June 18, 1968) was an American Major League Baseball pitcher who played for part of one season, appearing in three games for the Cleveland Naps from September 5, 1914, to September 14, 1914. Bishop attended Wichita State.
