= George Beck (baseball) =

American baseball player (1890–1973)

- Pitcher
- Born: February 21, 1890; South Bend, Indiana, U.S.
- Died: October 29, 1973 (aged 83); South Bend, Indiana, U.S.
- Batted: Right Threw: Right

MLB debut
- May 15, 1914, for the Cleveland Naps

Last MLB appearance
- May 15, 1914, for the Cleveland Naps

MLB statistics
- Win–loss record: 0-0
- Earned run average: 0.00
- Strikeouts: 0
- Stats at Baseball Reference

Teams
- Cleveland Naps (1914)

George Beck (February 21, 1890 – October 29, 1973) played professional baseball in 1914 for the Cleveland Naps. Beck pitched one inning in his only game in the majors, allowing one hit and hitting a batter.
