= Doc Johnston =

American baseball player (1887–1961)

Wheeler "Doc" Johnston
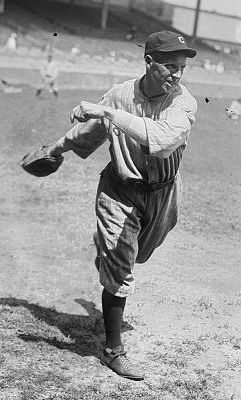
- First baseman
- Born: September 9, 1887; Cleveland, Tennessee, U.S.
- Died: February 17, 1961 (aged 73); Chattanooga, Tennessee, U.S.
- Batted: Left Threw: Left

MLB debut
- October 3, 1909, for the Cincinnati Reds

Last MLB appearance
- September 30, 1922, for the Philadelphia Athletics

MLB statistics
- Batting average: .263
- Home runs: 14
- Runs batted in: 381
- Stats at Baseball Reference

Teams
- Cincinnati Reds (1909); Cleveland Indians (1912–1914); Pittsburgh Pirates (1915–1916); Cleveland Indians (1918–1921); Philadelphia Athletics (1922)

Career highlights and awards
- World Series champion (1920)

Wheeler Roger "Doc" Johnston (September 9, 1887 – February 17, 1961) was an American professional baseball first baseman. He played in Major League Baseball (MLB) from 1909 through 1922.

During eleven seasons in the major leagues, Johnston played for the Cincinnati Reds, Cleveland Indians, Pittsburgh Pirates, and Philadelphia Athletics. He batted .263 (992-for-3774) with 14 home runs, 478 runs and 381 RBIs, and was a member of the Indians team that won the 1920 World Series. His brother Jimmy Johnston was also a major league player.

Doc played against his brother Jimmy in the 1920 World Series, with Doc playing for Cleveland and Jimmy on the Brooklyn Robins. It marked the first World Series and first Big Four championship to feature two brothers on opposing teams.

Johnston served as a plant manager for a refinery in Chattanooga, Tennessee from 1926–1951. Johnston died after a long illness on February 18, 1961 in Chattanooga.
