= Vean Gregg =

American baseball player (1885–1964)

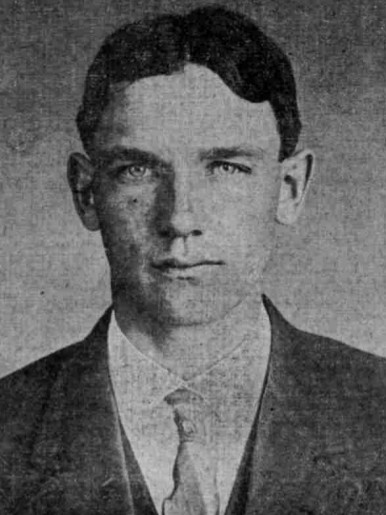
- Pitcher
- Born: April 13, 1885; Chehalis, Washington, U.S.
- Died: July 29, 1964 (aged 79); Aberdeen, Washington, U.S.
- Batted: Right Threw: Left

MLB debut
- April 12, 1911, for the Cleveland Naps

Last MLB appearance
- August 25, 1925, for the Washington Senators

MLB statistics
- Win–loss record: 92–63
- Earned run average: 2.70
- Strikeouts: 720
- Stats at Baseball Reference

Teams
- Cleveland Naps (1911–1914); Boston Red Sox (1914–1916); Philadelphia Athletics (1918); Washington Senators (1925)

Career highlights and awards
- World Series champion (1915); AL ERA leader (1911)

Sylveanus Augustus "Vean" Gregg (April 13, 1885 – July 29, 1964) was an American professional baseball player. A pitcher, Gregg played in Major League Baseball (MLB) for the Cleveland Naps, Boston Red Sox, Philadelphia Athletics, and Washington Senators from 1911 through 1925.

Gregg was given the nickname, "the Western Wonder". He won 20 games in his first three seasons, becoming the only MLB ballplayer to accomplish the feat in the 20th century. Gregg led the American League in earned run average in 1911 and was on the roster of the Red Sox when they won the 1915 World Series, but did not appear in any games.

== Early life ==
Gregg was born in Chehalis, Washington and lived for most of his youth in Clarkston. His brother, Dave Gregg, pitched one inning in 1913 as Vean's teammate for the Cleveland Naps.

== Professional career ==
Gregg started his professional career with the Spokane Indians of the Northwestern League in 1910. In 1910, he played for the Portland Beavers of the Pacific Coast League (PCL). He threw 14 shutouts with the Beavers.

The next year, Gregg played for the Cleveland Naps of the American League, pitching to a 23–7 win–loss record with a league-leading 1.80 earned run average. In 1912 and 1913, he started 34 games both years with an identical 20–13 record each season.

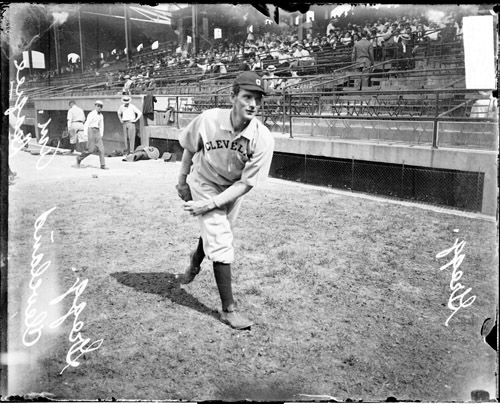
Gregg with the Cleveland Naps

On July 28, 1914, the Naps traded Gregg to the Boston Red Sox for Fritz Coumbe, Ben Egan, and Rankin Johnson Sr. He developed a sore arm in 1914 and had continual arm problems for the rest of his career. He played for them on both the 1915, and 1916 World Series championship teams, but did not appear in either.

On December 14, 1917, the Red Sox traded Gregg, Merlin Kopp, Pinch Thomas and $60,000 to the Philadelphia Athletics for Bullet Joe Bush, Wally Schang, and Amos Strunk. Gregg went 9–14 in 30 games with a 3.12 ERA for the last-place Athletics in 1918.

When the United States entered World War I in 1918, major league baseball was suspended. At age 33, Vean was too old to enlist. Instead, he went to work the ranch in Conjuring Creek, Alberta, Canada that he had purchased near Edmonton in 1912. He also played baseball for a number of different teams; aside from the Conjuring Creek team, he also played for the Calgary Great War Veterans Association (GWVA) team in 1919, and was reportedly signed to the Edmonton Eskimos baseball team in August 1921. However, the need to pay off his farming debts pushed him back south of the border.

Gregg returned to professional baseball in 1922 with the Seattle Indians of the PCL and played there until 1924. After the 1924 season, Seattle sold Gregg to the Washington Senators of the American League for three players and cash considerations. In the 1925 season, Gregg went 2–2 with two saves. His final appearance, at any level, was in 1927 and consisted of a one-third inning outing for the Sacramento Senators of the PCL.

== Career statistics ==
Gregg's major league career record was 92–63 with a lifetime 2.70 ERA in 1,393 innings pitched and 720 strikeouts. He was the only pitcher in the 20th century to win 20 games or more in his first three seasons.

== Player profile ==
Gregg was given the nickname, "the Western Wonder" and was declared by Ty Cobb to be "the toughest lefty he ever faced". Eddie Collins called Gregg "the left-handed Walter Johnson".

== Post career and personal life ==
Gregg was married while in Alberta; his first wife, Goldina Grace Gregg, divorced him in Edmonton in May 1925.

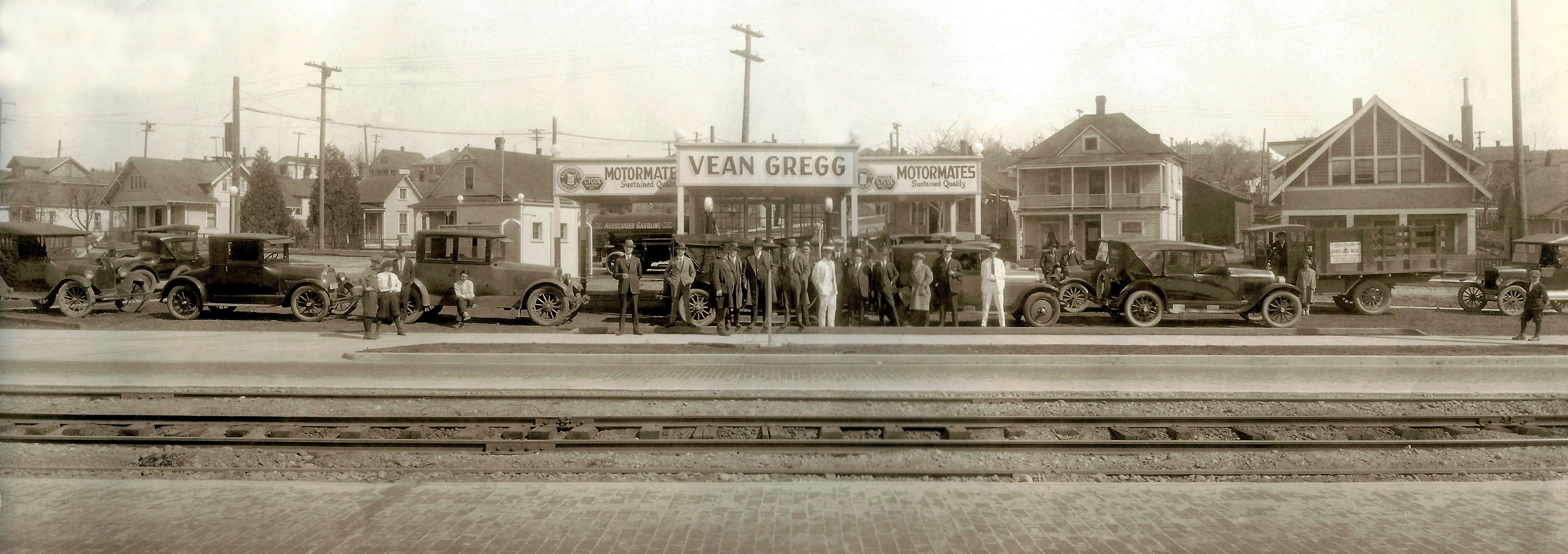
Vean Gregg Service Station, Seattle, 1925

Vean's brother, Dave Gregg, played for Cleveland in 1913. Vean and Dave opened a gas station under the name "Vean Gregg Service Station" in Seattle during his return to the PCL. After his playing career ended, he owned and operated The Home Plate, a combined café and sporting goods store in Hoquiam, Washington. In 1934, Gregg ran for sheriff of Grays Harbor County, Washington.

In 2004, Gregg was inducted in the Pacific Coast League Hall of Fame.

Gregg and his second wife, Dorothy, had five children. He died on July 29, 1964, in Aberdeen, Washington.

== See also ==
- List of Major League Baseball annual ERA leaders
