= Walter Barbare =

American baseball player (1891–1965)

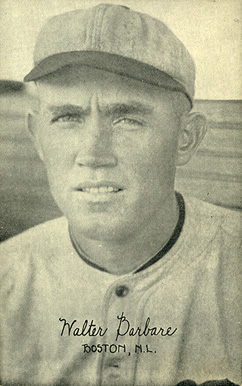
- Infielder
- Born: August 11, 1891; Greenville, South Carolina, U.S.
- Died: October 28, 1965 (aged 74); Greenville, South Carolina, U.S.
- Batted: Right Threw: Right

MLB debut
- September 17, 1914, for the Cleveland Naps

Last MLB appearance
- October 1, 1922, for the Boston Braves

MLB statistics
- Batting average: .260
- Home runs: 1
- Runs batted in: 156
- Stats at Baseball Reference

Teams
- Cleveland Naps (1914–1916); Boston Red Sox (1918); Pittsburgh Pirates (1919–1920); Boston Braves (1921–1922)

Walter Lawrence Barbare (August 11, 1891 – October 28, 1965) was an American professional baseball infielder who played in Major League Baseball for the Cleveland Indians, Boston Red Sox, Pittsburgh Pirates, and Boston Braves.

In an eight-season career, Barbare was a .260 hitter with one home run and 156 RBI in 500 games played.

A solid infielder with a strong arm and a light bat, Barbare was a utility man with the Indians, Red Sox and Pirates in a span of six seasons. In 1921 he was sent to the Braves in the same trade that brought star shortstop Rabbit Maranville to Pittsburgh, and he responded with a career year, hitting .302 in 134 games.

Following his retirement as a player, Barbare served as a manager and umpire in the minor leagues.

== Sources ==
- Career statistics from Baseball Reference · Baseball Reference (Minors) · Retrosheet · Baseball Almanac
