= George Dunlop (baseball) =

American baseball player (1888-1971)

- Shortstop / Third baseman
- Born: July 19, 1888; Meriden, Connecticut, U.S.
- Died: December 12, 1971 (aged 83); Meriden, Connecticut, U.S.
- Batted: Right Threw: Right

MLB debut
- September 9, 1913, for the Cleveland Naps

Last MLB appearance
- June 10, 1914, for the Cleveland Naps

MLB statistics
- Batting average: .200
- Home runs: 0
- Runs batted in: 0
- Stats at Baseball Reference

Teams
- Cleveland Naps (1913–1914)

George Henry Dunlop (July 19, 1888 – December 12, 1971) was an American Major League Baseball (MLB) infielder who played for two seasons. He played for the Cleveland Naps from 1913 to 1914, playing in eight total games.
