= Rivington Bisland =

American baseball player (1890–1973)

- Shortstop
- Born: February 17, 1890; New York City, U.S.
- Died: January 11, 1973 (aged 82); Salzburg, Austria
- Batted: Right Threw: Right

MLB debut
- September 13, 1912, for the Pittsburgh Pirates

Last MLB appearance
- June 12, 1914, for the Cleveland Naps

MLB statistics
- Batting average: .118
- Home runs: 0
- Runs batted in: 5
- Stats at Baseball Reference

Teams
- Pittsburgh Pirates (1912); St. Louis Browns (1913); Cleveland Naps (1914)

Rivington Martin Bisland (February 17, 1890 – January 11, 1973) was a professional baseball player. He played parts of three seasons in Major League Baseball for three teams between 1912 and 1914, primarily as a shortstop.

During his brief major league career, Bisland seemed to be the very definition of good-field, no-hit, recording an above-average fielding percentage while batting just .118.

== Sources ==
- Career statistics from Baseball Reference · Baseball Reference (Minors) · Retrosheet · Baseball Almanac
