= 1913 Major League Baseball season =

1913 MLB season
- League: American League (AL); National League (NL)
- Sport: Baseball
- Duration: Regular season: April 10 – October 5, 1913 (AL); April 9 – October 5, 1913 (NL); World Series: October 7 – October 11, 1913
- Games: 154
- Teams: 16 (8 per league)

Regular Season
- Season MVP: AL: Walter Johnson (WSH); NL: Jake Daubert (BRO)
- AL champions: Philadelphia Athletics
- AL runners-up: Boston Red Sox
- NL champions: New York Giants
- NL runners-up: Philadelphia Phillies

World Series
- Champions: Philadelphia Athletics
- Runners-up: New York Giants

MLB seasons
- ← 1912 1914 →

Locations of teams for the 1913–1914 American League seasons
American League
Locations of teams for the 1913 National League season
National League

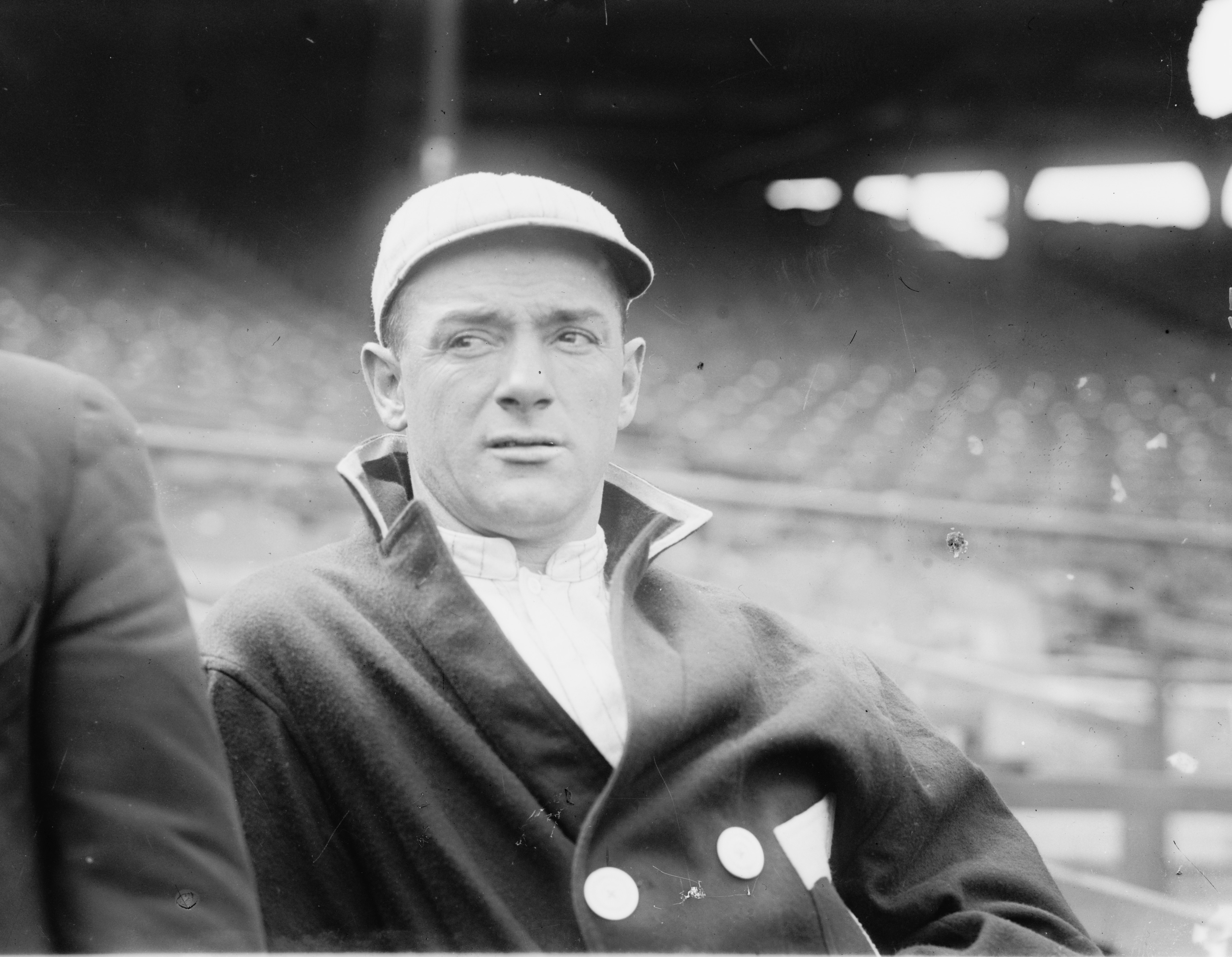
Charles "Heinie" Wagner, shortstop with the Boston Red Sox prior to a game, circa 1913.

The 1913 major league baseball season began on April 9, 1913. The regular season ended on October 5, with the New York Giants and Philadelphia Athletics as the regular season champions of the National League and American League, respectively. The postseason began with Game 1 of the tenth World Series on October 7 and ended with Game 5 on October 11. In the third iteration of this World Series matchup, the Athletics defeated the Giants, four games to one, capturing their third championship in franchise history, since their previous in 1911. Going into the season, the defending World Series champions were the Boston Red Sox from the 1912 season.

This was the third of four seasons that the Chalmers Award, a precursor to the Major League Baseball Most Valuable Player Award (introduced in 1931), was given to a player in each league.

The Brooklyn Trolley Dodgers shortened its name to the Brooklyn Dodgers and the New York Highlanders renamed as the New York Yankees.

== Schedule ==
The 1913 schedule consisted of 154 games for all teams in the American League and National League, each of which had eight teams. Each team was scheduled to play 22 games against the other seven teams of their respective league. This continued the format put in place for the 1904 season. This format would last until 1919.

National League Opening Day took place on April 9 with a game between the Philadelphia Phillies and Brooklyn Dodgers, while American League Opening Day took place the following day, with all AL teams but the Chicago White Sox and Cleveland Naps, playing. The final day of the regular season was on October 5. The World Series took place between October 7 and October 11.

== Rule change ==
The National League ruled that umpires could no longer scout for teams, as was the case when Umpire Cy Rigler was being paid $2,200 (equivalent to $71,700 in 2025) by the Philadelphia Phillies for his role in having the team sign a pitcher, Eppa Rixey.

== Teams ==
An asterisk (*) denotes the ballpark a team played the minority of their home games at

League	Team	City	Ballpark	Capacity	Manager
American League	Boston Red Sox	Boston, Massachusetts	Fenway Park	27,000	Jake Stahl
American League	Boston Red Sox	Boston, Massachusetts	Fenway Park	27,000	Bill Carrigan
American League	Chicago White Sox	Chicago, Illinois	Comiskey Park	28,000	Jimmy Callahan
American League	Cleveland Naps	Cleveland, Ohio	League Park	21,414	Joe Birmingham
American League	Detroit Tigers	Detroit, Michigan	Navin Field	23,000	Hughie Jennings
American League	New York Yankees	New York, New York	Brush Stadium	34,000	Frank Chance
American League	Philadelphia Athletics	Philadelphia, Pennsylvania	Shibe Park	23,000	Connie Mack
American League	St. Louis Browns	St. Louis, Missouri	Sportsman's Park	18,000	George Stovall
American League	St. Louis Browns	St. Louis, Missouri	Sportsman's Park	18,000	Jimmy Austin
American League	St. Louis Browns	St. Louis, Missouri	Sportsman's Park	18,000	Branch Rickey
American League	Washington Senators	Washington, D.C.	National Park	27,000	Clark Griffith
National League	Boston Braves	Boston, Massachusetts	South End Grounds	11,000	George Stallings
National League	Boston Braves	Boston, Massachusetts	Fenway Park*	27,000*	George Stallings
National League	Brooklyn Dodgers	New York, New York	Ebbets Field	18,000	Bill Dahlen
National League	Chicago Cubs	Chicago, Illinois	West Side Park	16,000	Johnny Evers
National League	Cincinnati Reds	Cincinnati, Ohio	Redland Field	20,696	Joe Tinker
National League	New York Giants	New York, New York	Brush Stadium	34,000	John McGraw
National League	Philadelphia Phillies	Philadelphia, Pennsylvania	National League Park	18,000	Red Dooin
National League	Pittsburgh Pirates	Pittsburgh, Pennsylvania	Forbes Field	23,000	Fred Clarke
National League	St. Louis Cardinals	St. Louis, Missouri	Robison Field	21,000	Miller Huggins

== Standings ==
=== American League ===
American League
Team	W	L	Pct.	GB	Home	Road
Philadelphia Athletics	96	57	.627	—	50‍–‍26	46‍–‍31
Washington Senators	90	64	.584	6½	42‍–‍35	48‍–‍29
Cleveland Naps	86	66	.566	9½	45‍–‍32	41‍–‍34
Boston Red Sox	79	71	.527	15½	41‍–‍34	38‍–‍37
Chicago White Sox	78	74	.513	17½	40‍–‍37	38‍–‍37
Detroit Tigers	66	87	.431	30	34‍–‍42	32‍–‍45
New York Yankees	57	94	.377	38	27‍–‍47	30‍–‍47
St. Louis Browns	57	96	.373	39	31‍–‍46	26‍–‍50

=== National League ===
National League
Team	W	L	Pct.	GB	Home	Road
New York Giants	101	51	.664	—	54‍–‍23	47‍–‍28
Philadelphia Phillies	88	63	.583	12½	43‍–‍33	45‍–‍30
Chicago Cubs	88	65	.575	13½	51‍–‍25	37‍–‍40
Pittsburgh Pirates	78	71	.523	21½	41‍–‍35	37‍–‍36
Boston Braves	69	82	.457	31½	34‍–‍40	35‍–‍42
Brooklyn Dodgers	65	84	.436	34½	29‍–‍47	36‍–‍37
Cincinnati Reds	64	89	.418	37½	32‍–‍44	32‍–‍45
St. Louis Cardinals	51	99	.340	49	25‍–‍48	26‍–‍51

=== Tie games ===
21 tie games (5 in AL, 16 in NL), which are not factored into winning percentage or games behind (and were often replayed again) occurred throughout the season.

==== American League ====
- Boston Red Sox, 1
- Chicago White Sox, 1
- Cleveland Naps, 3
- New York Yankees, 2
- St. Louis Browns, 2
- Washington Senators, 1

==== National League ====
- Boston Braves, 3
- Brooklyn Dodgers, 3
- Chicago Cubs, 2
- Cincinnati Reds, 3
- New York Giants, 4
- Philadelphia Phillies, 8
- Pittsburgh Pirates, 6
- St. Louis Cardinals, 3

== Postseason ==
The postseason began on October 7 and ended on October 11 with the Philadelphia Athletics defeating the New York Giants in the 1913 World Series in five games.

=== Bracket ===
World Series
AL	Philadelphia Athletics	4
NL	New York Giants	1

== Managerial changes ==
=== Off-season ===
Team	Former Manager	New Manager
Boston Braves	Johnny Kling	George Stallings
Chicago Cubs	Frank Chance	Johnny Evers
Cincinnati Reds	Hank O'Day	Joe Tinker
New York Yankees	Harry Wolverton	Frank Chance
St. Louis Cardinals	Roger Bresnahan	Miller Huggins

=== In-season ===
Team	Former Manager	New Manager
Boston Red Sox	Jake Stahl	Bill Carrigan
St. Louis Browns	George Stovall	Jimmy Austin
St. Louis Browns	Jimmy Austin	Branch Rickey

== League leaders ==
=== American League ===
Hitting leaders
Stat	Player	Total
AVG	Ty Cobb (DET)	.389
OPS	Joe Jackson (CLE)	1.011
HR	Home Run Baker (PHA)	12
RBI	Home Run Baker (PHA)	117
R	Eddie Collins (PHA)	125
H	Joe Jackson (CLE)	197
SB	Clyde Milan (WSH)	75

Pitching leaders
Stat	Player	Total
W	Walter Johnson^{1} (WSH)	36
L	Jim Scott (CWS)	21
ERA	Walter Johnson^{1} (WSH)	1.14
K	Walter Johnson^{1} (WSH)	243
IP	Walter Johnson (WSH)	346.0
SV	Charles Bender (PHA)	13
WHIP	Walter Johnson (WSH)	0.780

^{1} American League Triple Crown pitching winner

=== National League ===
Hitting leaders
Stat	Player	Total
AVG	Jake Daubert (BRO)	.350
OPS	Gavvy Cravath (PHI)	.974
HR	Gavvy Cravath (PHI)	19
RBI	Gavvy Cravath (PHI)	128
R	Max Carey (PIT); Tommy Leach (CHC)	120
H	Gavvy Cravath (PHI)	179
SB	Max Carey (PIT)	61

Pitching leaders
Stat	Player	Total
W	Tom Seaton (PHI)	27
L	Dan Griner (STL)	22
ERA	Christy Mathewson (NYG)	2.06
K	Tom Seaton (PHI)	168
IP	Tom Seaton (PHI)	322.1
SV	Larry Cheney (CHC)	11
WHIP	Christy Mathewson (NYG)	1.020

== Milestones ==
=== Batters ===
- Harry Hooper (BOS):
  - Became the first player to hit a home run as the lead-off hitter in both games of a doubleheader, against the Washington Senators on May 30.

=== Pitchers ===
- Washington Senators:
  - The Washington Senators used eight pitchers including infielder Germany Schaefer, catcher Eddie Ainsmith, outfielder Joe Gedeon and manager Clark Griffith, against the Boston Red Sox on October 4. Despite the use of these non-pitchers, the Senators win the game 10–9.

=== Miscellaneous ===
- Detroit Tigers / Philadelphia Athletics:
  - Became the third set of teams to tie a major league record and set an American League record for most combined walks in a single game at 23, with the Detroit Tigers walking 16 batters and the Philadelphia Athletics walking 7, on July 12 in a game that Philadelphia won 16–9.
- Philadelphia Athletics / New York Yankees:
  - Became the fourth set of teams to tie a major league record and second to tie an American League record for most combined walks in a single game at 23, with the Philadelphia Athletics walking 10 batters and the New York Yankees walking 13, on October 4 in a game that New York won 10–8.
- Chicago White Sox:
  - Set a Major League record for the fewest at bats by a team in a season at 4,827.

== Awards and honors ==
- Chalmers Award: Jake Daubert (BRO, National); Walter Johnson (WSH, American)

== Home field attendance ==
Team name	Wins	%±	Home attendance	%±	Per game
Chicago White Sox	78	1.3%	602,241	3.3%	7,721
New York Giants	103	4.0%	638,000	−5.5%	8,395
Philadelphia Athletics	90	−10.9%	517,653	−14.5%	6,723
Cleveland Naps	75	−6.3%	336,844	−17.1%	4,375
Philadelphia Phillies	73	−7.6%	250,000	−39.9%	3,333
Boston Red Sox	105	34.6%	597,096	18.5%	7,655
Chicago Cubs	91	−1.1%	514,000	−10.8%	6,590
Detroit Tigers	69	−22.5%	402,870	−16.9%	5,301
New York Yankees	50	−34.2%	242,194	−19.9%	3,187
Brooklyn Dodgers	58	−9.4%	243,000	−9.7%	3,197
Washington Senators	91	42.2%	350,663	43.2%	4,496
Pittsburgh Pirates	93	9.4%	384,000	−11.1%	5,120
Cincinnati Reds	75	7.1%	344,000	14.7%	4,468
St. Louis Browns	53	17.8%	214,070	2.9%	2,710
Boston Braves	52	18.2%	121,000	4.3%	1,532
St. Louis Cardinals	63	−16.0%	241,759	−46.0%	3,140

== Venues ==
The 1913 season saw two teams move to two venues.

- The Brooklyn Dodgers leave Washington Park (where they played for 15 seasons) and opened Ebbets Field, where they would go on to play for 45 seasons through 1957.
- The New York Highlanders leave Hilltop Park (where they played for 10 seasons) and moved into the home of the New York Giants, where they would go on to play for ten seasons through 1922. The move prompted the official name of the team to change from the Highlanders to the New York Yankees.

The Chicago White Sox renamed White Sox Park to Comiskey Park, named after team owner Charles Comiskey.

The Boston Braves play two doubleheaders on April 19 and May 30 at the home of the Boston Red Sox at Fenway Park to accommodate large crowds.

== See also ==
- 1913 in baseball (Events, Births, Deaths)
