= 1913 Philadelphia Athletics season =

1913 Philadelphia Athletics
- World Series champions American League champions
- League: American League
- Ballpark: Shibe Park
- City: Philadelphia
- Record: 96–57 (.627)
- League place: 1st
- Owners: Connie Mack, Benjamin Shibe, Tom Shibe and John Shibe
- Managers: Connie Mack

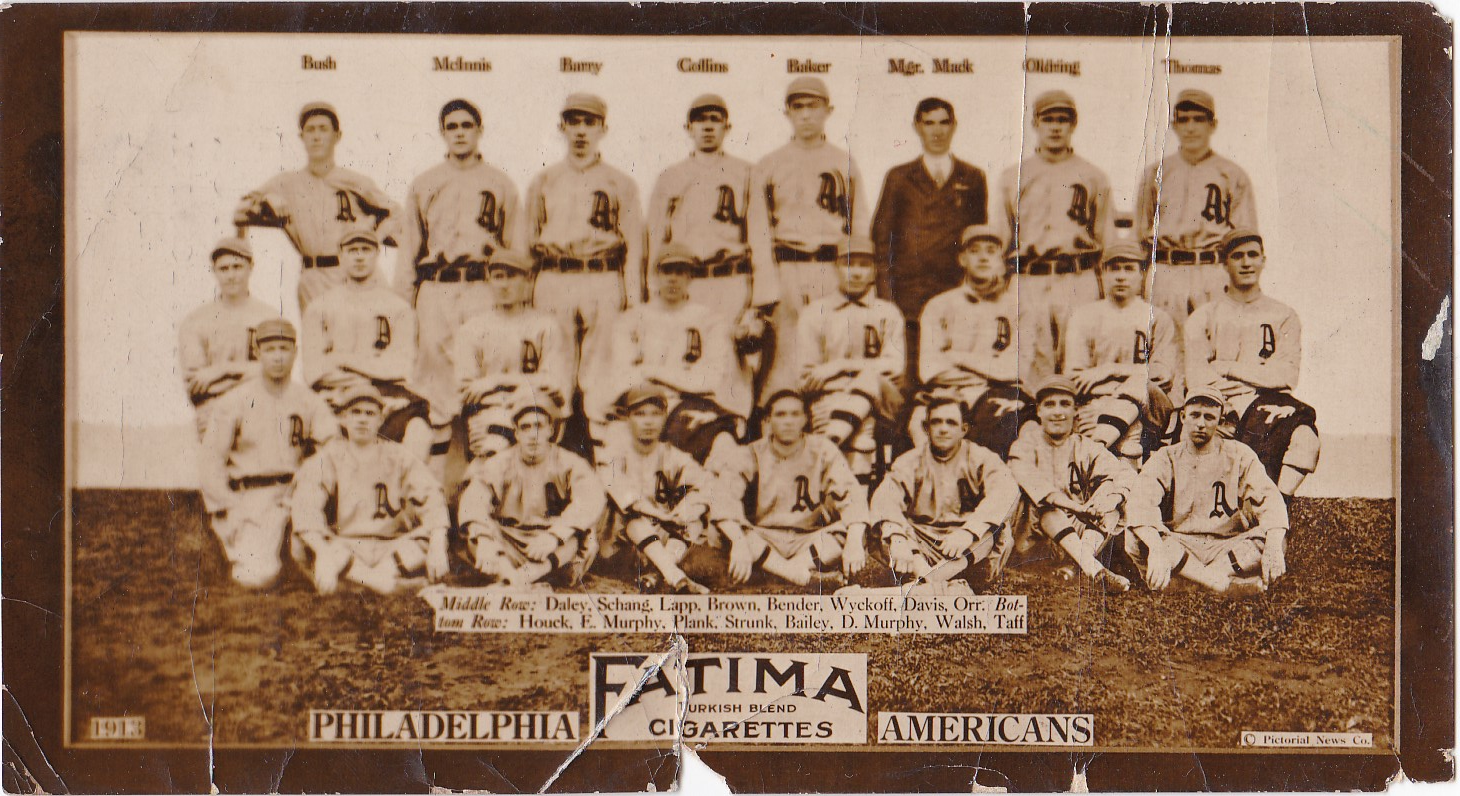
1913 Fatima baseball card of Philadelphia Athletics

The 1913 Philadelphia Athletics season involved the A's finishing first in the American League with a record of 96 wins and 57 losses. The team then defeated the New York Giants in the 1913 World Series, 4 games to 1. In 2001, baseball historian Bill James ranked the 1913 incarnation of the Athletics' famous "$100,000 infield" as the best of all time in major league history (first baseman Stuffy McInnis, second baseman Eddie Collins, third baseman Frank "Home Run" Baker, and shortstop Jack Barry).

== Regular season ==
=== Season standings ===
American League
Team	W	L	Pct.	GB	Home	Road
Philadelphia Athletics	96	57	.627	—	50‍–‍26	46‍–‍31
Washington Senators	90	64	.584	6½	42‍–‍35	48‍–‍29
Cleveland Naps	86	66	.566	9½	45‍–‍32	41‍–‍34
Boston Red Sox	79	71	.527	15½	41‍–‍34	38‍–‍37
Chicago White Sox	78	74	.513	17½	40‍–‍37	38‍–‍37
Detroit Tigers	66	87	.431	30	34‍–‍42	32‍–‍45
New York Yankees	57	94	.377	38	27‍–‍47	30‍–‍47
St. Louis Browns	57	96	.373	39	31‍–‍46	26‍–‍50

=== Record vs. opponents ===
1913 American League record Sources:
Team	BOS	CWS	CLE	DET	NYY	PHA	SLB	WSH
Boston	—	10–11	8–13	13–9	14–6–1	11–11	17–5	6–16
Chicago	11–10	—	9–13–1	13–9	11–10	11–11	12–10	11–11
Cleveland	13–8	13–9–1	—	14–7	14–8–1	9–13	16–6–1	7–15
Detroit	9–13	9–13	7–14	—	11–11	7–15	11–11	12–10
New York	6–14–1	10–11	8–14–1	11–11	—	5–17	11–11	6–16
Philadelphia	11–11	11–11	13–9	15–7	17–5	—	15–6	14–8
St. Louis	5–17	10–12	6–16–1	11–11	11–11	6–15	—	8–14–1
Washington	16–6	11–11	15–7	10–12	16–6	8–14	14–8–1	—

=== Roster ===
1913 Philadelphia Athletics
Roster
Pitchers: Chief Bender; Charlie Boardman; Pat Bohen; Boardwalk Brown; Joe Bush; Jack Coombs; Ensign Cottrell; Byron Houck; Dave Morey; Herb Pennock; Eddie Plank; Bob Shawkey; John Taff; Weldon Wyckoff	Catchers: Joe Giebel; Jack Lapp; Wickey McAvoy; Wally Schang; Ira Thomas; Infielders: Frank Baker; Jack Barry; Eddie Collins; Press Cruthers; Harry Davis; Harry Fritz; Doc Lavan; Stuffy McInnis; Billy Orr; Monte Pfeffer	Outfielders: George Brickley; Tom Daley; Danny Murphy; Eddie Murphy; Rube Oldring; Amos Strunk; Jimmy Walsh	Manager: Connie Mack

== Player stats ==
=== Batting ===
==== Starters by position ====
Note: Pos = Position; G = Games played; AB = At bats; H = Hits; Avg. = Batting average; HR = Home runs; RBI = Runs batted in

Pos	Player	G	AB	H	Avg.	HR	RBI
C	Jack Lapp	82	238	54	.227	1	20
1B	Stuffy McInnis	148	543	176	.324	4	90
2B	Eddie Collins	148	534	184	.345	3	73
3B	Frank Baker	149	564	190	.337	12	117
SS	Jack Barry	134	455	125	.275	3	85
OF	Rube Oldring	137	538	152	.283	5	71
OF	Eddie Murphy	137	508	150	.295	1	30
OF	Jimmy Walsh	97	303	77	.254	0	27

==== Other batters ====
Note: G = Games played; AB = At bats; H = Hits; Avg. = Batting average; HR = Home runs; RBI = Runs batted in

Player	G	AB	H	Avg.	HR	RBI
Amos Strunk	94	292	89	.305	0	46
Wally Schang	79	207	55	.266	3	30
Tom Daley	62	141	36	.255	0	11
Billy Orr	30	67	13	.194	0	7
Danny Murphy	40	59	19	.322	0	6
Ira Thomas	22	53	15	.283	0	6
Harry Davis	7	17	6	.353	0	4
Doc Lavan	5	14	1	.071	0	1
Harry Fritz	5	13	0	.000	0	0
Press Cruthers	3	12	3	.250	0	0
George Brickley	5	12	2	.167	0	0
Wickey McAvoy	4	9	1	.111	0	0
Monte Pfeffer	1	3	0	.000	0	0
Joe Giebel	1	3	1	.333	0	0

=== Pitching ===
==== Starting pitchers ====
Note: G = Games pitched; IP = Innings pitched; W = Wins; L = Losses; ERA = Earned run average; SO = Strikeouts

Player	G	IP	W	L	ERA	SO
Eddie Plank	41	242.2	18	10	2.60	151
Boardwalk Brown	43	235.1	17	11	2.94	70
Bob Shawkey	18	111.1	6	5	2.34	52
Charlie Boardman	2	9.0	0	2	2.00	4
Pat Bohen	1	8.0	0	1	1.13	5
Jack Coombs	2	5.1	0	0	10.13	0

==== Other pitchers ====
Note: G = Games pitched; IP = Innings pitched; W = Wins; L = Losses; ERA = Earned run average; SO = Strikeouts

Player	G	IP	W	L	ERA	SO
Chief Bender	48	236.2	21	10	2.21	135
Bullet Joe Bush	39	200.1	15	6	3.82	81
Byron Houck	41	176.0	14	6	4.14	71
Weldon Wyckoff	17	61.2	2	4	4.38	31
Herb Pennock	14	33.1	2	1	5.13	17
John Taff	7	17.2	0	1	6.62	9
Ensign Cottrell	2	10.0	1	0	5.40	3

==== Relief pitchers ====
Note: G = Games pitched; W = Wins; L = Losses; SV = Saves; ERA = Earned run average; SO = Strikeouts

Player	G	W	L	SV	ERA	SO
Dave Morey	2	0	0	0	4.50	1

== 1913 World Series ==
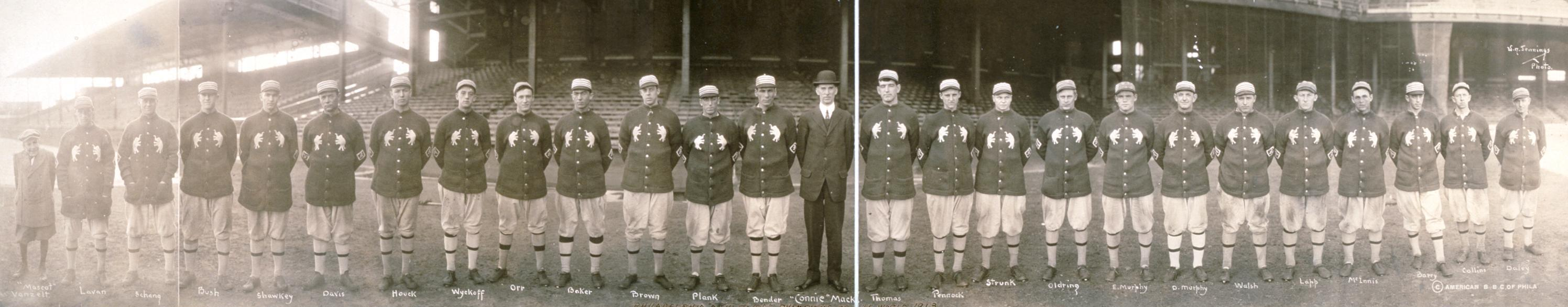
The World Series team

AL Philadelphia Athletics (4) vs. NL New York Giants (1)

Game	Score	Date	Location	Attendance
1	Athletics – 6, Giants – 4,	October 7	Polo Grounds	36,291
2	Giants – 3, Athletics – 0 (10 innings)	October 8	Shibe Park	20,563
3	Athletics – 8, Giants – 2	October 9	Polo Grounds	36,896
4	Giants – 5, Athletics – 6	October 10	Shibe Park	20,568
5	Athletics – 3, Giants – 1	October 11	Polo Grounds	36,682
