= List of Athletics seasons =

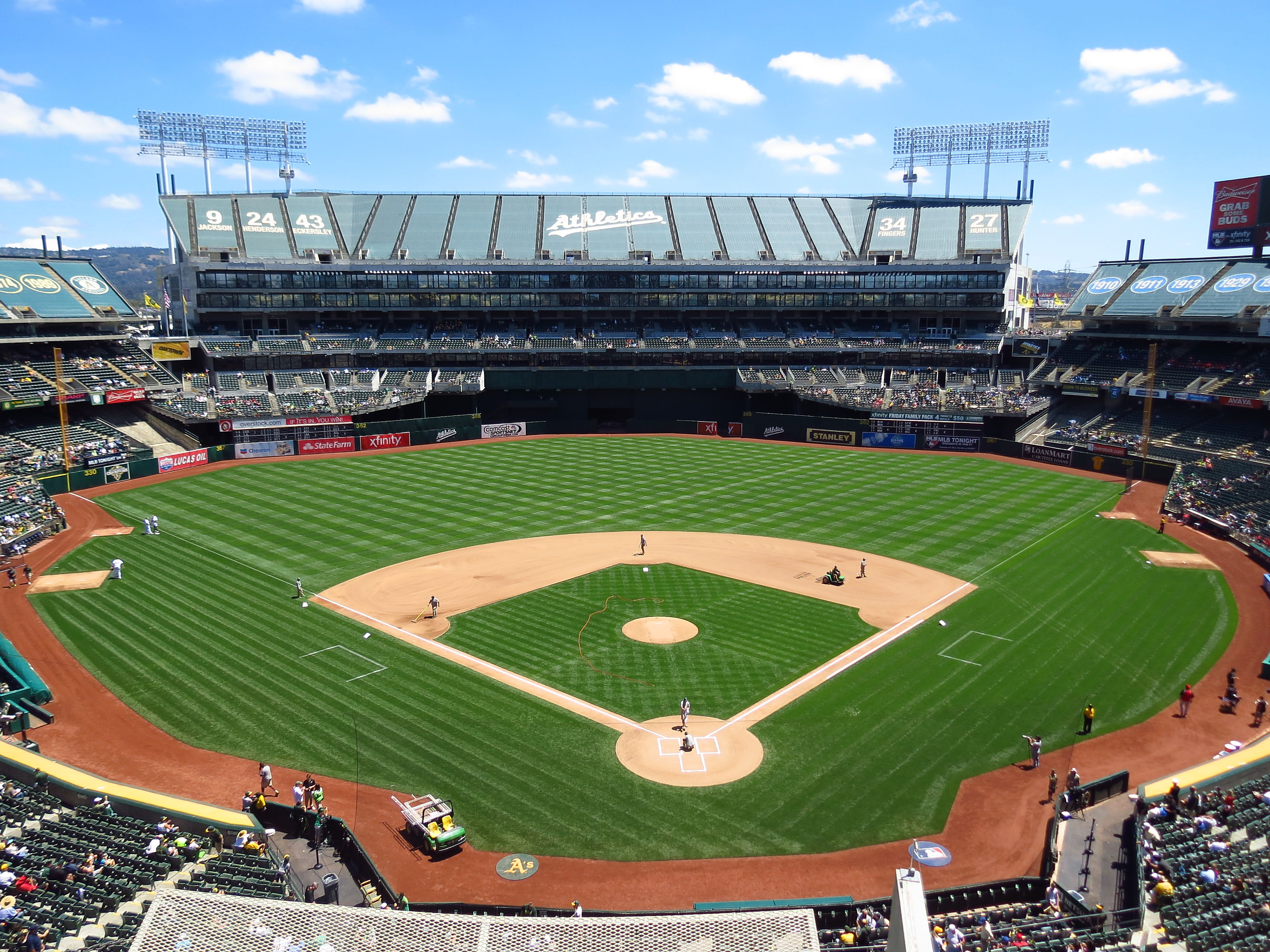
Oakland Coliseum, home field of the Athletics from 1968-2024.

The Athletics, formerly known as the Philadelphia, Kansas City, and Oakland Athletics are a professional baseball team based in West Sacramento, California. The Athletics have played in the American League (AL) ever since the league formed in 1901.

The Athletics have won nine World Series titles, tied for third most in all of Major League Baseball. They are the only team apart from the New York Yankees to complete a World Series “three-peat”, which they did between 1972 and 1974. As the Philadelphia Athletics, the team had a golden period between 1909 and 1914, when they won three World Series, and had three consecutive 100-win seasons between 1929 and 1931 with two further titles. In the period from 1988 to 1990 the Athletics - now based in Oakland - played in three further World Series and won one, while from 1999 to 2006 they had winning records every season but never played in another World Series.

The Athletics have had some bad periods of failure to counterbalance these golden eras. During and after World War I, the Athletics had nine consecutive losing seasons including the lowest win percentage in post-1900 major league baseball of .235 in 1916 and only 36 wins in 1919. Between 1934 and 1967 in Philadelphia and later Kansas City the team had sequences of thirteen and fifteen consecutive losing seasons and overall won 2,119 games and lost 3,147 for a winning percentage of .402.

The Athletics have qualified for the postseason 29 times (fourth most among all thirty teams), while having an 18–20 postseason series record. They have reached the World Series fourteen times while having won it nine times.

== Table key ==
MLB season	Each year is linked to an article about that particular MLB season.
Team season	Each year is linked to an article about that particular Brewers season.
Finish	The team's final position in the divisional standings
GB	Games behind the team that finished in first place in the division that season
Apps.	Postseason appearances: number of seasons the team qualified for the postseason
†	World Series champions (1969–present)
*	League champions (1969–present)
^	Division champions (1969–present)
¤	Wild card berth (1994–present)

== Season-by-season records ==
World Series champions †	AL champions *	Division champions (1969–present) ^	Wild card berth (1995–present) ¤

Season	Level	League	Division	Finish	Wins	Losses	Win%	GB	Postseason	Awards
Philadelphia Athletics
1901	MLB	AL	—	4th	74	62	.544	9		
1902	MLB	AL *	—	1st	83	53	.610	—		
1903	MLB	AL	—	2nd	75	60	.556	14½		
1904	MLB	AL	—	5th	81	70	.536	12½		
1905	MLB	AL *	—	1st	92	56	.622	—	Lost World Series (Giants) 4–1 *	
1906	MLB	AL	—	4th	78	67	.538	12		
1907	MLB	AL	—	2nd	88	57	.607	1½		
1908	MLB	AL	—	6th	68	85	.444	22		
1909	MLB	AL	—	2nd	95	58	.621	3½		
1910	MLB †	AL *	—	1st	102	48	.680	—	Won World Series (Cubs) 4–1 †	
1911	MLB †	AL *	—	1st	101	50	.669	—	Won World Series (Giants) 4–2 †	
1912	MLB	AL	—	3rd	90	62	.592	15		
1913	MLB †	AL *	—	1st	96	57	.627	—	Won World Series (Giants) 4–1 †	
1914	MLB	AL *	—	1st	99	53	.651	—	Lost World Series (Braves) 4–0 *	Eddie Collins (MVP)
1915	MLB	AL	—	8th	43	109	.283	58½		
1916	MLB	AL	—	8th	36	117	.235	54½		
1917	MLB	AL	—	8th	55	98	.359	44½		
1918	MLB	AL	—	8th	52	76	.406	24		
1919	MLB	AL	—	8th	36	104	.257	52		
1920	MLB	AL	—	8th	48	106	.312	50		
1921	MLB	AL	—	8th	53	100	.346	45		
1922	MLB	AL	—	7th	65	89	.422	29		
1923	MLB	AL	—	6th	69	83	.454	29		
1924	MLB	AL	—	5th	71	81	.467	20		
1925	MLB	AL	—	2nd	88	64	.579	8½		
1926	MLB	AL	—	3rd	83	67	.553	6		
1927	MLB	AL	—	2nd	91	63	.591	19		
1928	MLB	AL	—	2nd	98	55	.641	2½		Mickey Cochrane (MVP)
1929	MLB †	AL *	—	1st	104	46	.693	—	Won World Series (Cubs) 4–1 †	
1930	MLB †	AL *	—	1st	102	52	.662	—	Won World Series (Cardinals) 4–2 †	
1931	MLB	AL *	—	1st	107	45	.704	—	Lost World Series (Cardinals) 4–3 *	Lefty Grove (MVP)
1932	MLB	AL	—	2nd	94	60	.610	13		Jimmie Foxx (MVP)
1933	MLB	AL	—	3rd	79	72	.523	19½		Jimmie Foxx (MVP)
1934	MLB	AL	—	5th	68	82	.453	31		
1935	MLB	AL	—	8th	58	91	.389	34		
1936	MLB	AL	—	8th	53	100	.346	49		
1937	MLB	AL	—	7th	54	97	.358	46½		
1938	MLB	AL	—	8th	53	99	.349	46		
1939	MLB	AL	—	7th	55	97	.362	51½		
1940	MLB	AL	—	8th	54	100	.351	36		
1941	MLB	AL	—	8th	64	90	.416	37		
1942	MLB	AL	—	8th	55	99	.357	48		
1943	MLB	AL	—	8th	49	105	.318	49		
1944	MLB	AL	—	5th	72	82	.468	17		
1945	MLB	AL	—	8th	52	98	.347	34½		
1946	MLB	AL	—	8th	49	105	.318	55		
1947	MLB	AL	—	5th	78	76	.506	19		
1948	MLB	AL	—	4th	84	70	.545	12½		
1949	MLB	AL	—	5th	81	73	.526	16		
1950	MLB	AL	—	8th	52	102	.338	46		
1951	MLB	AL	—	6th	70	84	.455	28		
1952	MLB	AL	—	4th	79	75	.513	16		Harry Byrd (ROY); Bobby Shantz (MVP)
1953	MLB	AL	—	7th	59	95	.383	41½		
1954	MLB	AL	—	8th	51	103	.331	60		
Kansas City Athletics
1955	MLB	AL	—	6th	63	91	.409	33		
1956	MLB	AL	—	8th	52	102	.338	45		
1957	MLB	AL	—	7th	59	94	.386	38½		
1958	MLB	AL	—	7th	73	81	.474	19		
1959	MLB	AL	—	7th	66	88	.429	28		
1960	MLB	AL	—	8th	58	96	.377	39		
1961	MLB	AL	—	9th	61	100	.379	47½		
1962	MLB	AL	—	9th	72	90	.444	24		
1963	MLB	AL	—	8th	73	89	.451	31½		
1964	MLB	AL	—	10th	57	105	.352	42		
1965	MLB	AL	—	10th	59	103	.364	43		
1966	MLB	AL	—	7th	74	86	.463	23		
1967	MLB	AL	—	10th	62	99	.385	29½		
Oakland Athletics
1968	MLB	AL	—	6th	82	80	.506	21		
1969	MLB	AL	West	2nd	88	74	.543	9		
1970	MLB	AL	West	2nd	89	73	.549	9		
1971	MLB	AL	West ^	1st	101	60	.627	—	Lost ALCS (Orioles) 3–0	Vida Blue (MVP, CYA)
1972	MLB †	AL *	West ^	1st	93	62	.600	—	Won ALCS (Tigers) 3–2; Won World Series (Reds) 4–3 †	Gene Tenace (WS MVP)
1973	MLB †	AL *	West ^	1st	94	68	.580	—	Won ALCS (Orioles) 3–2; Won World Series (Mets) 4–3 †	Reggie Jackson (MVP, WS MVP)
1974	MLB †	AL *	West ^	1st	90	72	.556	—	Won ALCS (Orioles) 3–1; Won World Series (Dodgers) 4–1 †	Jim "Catfish" Hunter (CYA); Rollie Fingers (WS MVP)
1975	MLB	AL	West ^	1st	98	64	.605	—	Lost ALCS (Red Sox) 3–0	
1976	MLB	AL	West	2nd	87	74	.540	2½		
1977	MLB	AL	West	7th	63	98	.391	38½		
1978	MLB	AL	West	6th	69	93	.426	23		
1979	MLB	AL	West	7th	54	108	.333	34		
1980	MLB	AL	West	2nd	83	79	.512	14		
1981	MLB	AL	West ^	1st	37	23	.617	—	Won ALDS (Royals) 3–0; Lost ALCS (Yankees) 3–0	
1981	MLB	AL	West ^	2nd	27	22	.551	1	Won ALDS (Royals) 3–0; Lost ALCS (Yankees) 3–0	
1982	MLB	AL	West	5th	68	94	.420	25		
1983	MLB	AL	West	4th	74	88	.457	25		
1984	MLB	AL	West	4th	77	85	.475	7		
1985	MLB	AL	West	4th	77	85	.475	14		
1986	MLB	AL	West	4th	76	86	.469	16		Jose Canseco (ROY)
1987	MLB	AL	West	3rd	81	81	.500	4		Mark McGwire (ROY)
1988	MLB	AL *	West ^	1st	104	58	.642	—	Won ALCS (Red Sox) 4–0; Lost World Series (Dodgers) 4–1 *	Walt Weiss (ROY); Jose Canseco (MVP); Tony La Russa (MOY)
1989	MLB †	AL *	West ^	1st	99	63	.611	—	Won ALCS (Blue Jays) 4–1; Won World Series (Giants) 4–0 †	Dave Stewart (WS MVP)
1990	MLB	AL *	West ^	1st	103	59	.636	—	Won ALCS (Red Sox) 4–0; Lost World Series (Reds) 4–0 *	Rickey Henderson (MVP); Bob Welch (CYA)
1991	MLB	AL	West	4th	84	78	.519	11		
1992	MLB	AL	West ^	1st	96	66	.593	—	Lost ALCS (Blue Jays) 4–2	Dennis Eckersley (MVP, CYA); Tony La Russa (MOY)
1993	MLB	AL	West	7th	68	94	.420	26		
1994	MLB	AL	West	2nd	51	63	.447	1		
1995	MLB	AL	West	4th	67	77	.465	11½		
1996	MLB	AL	West	3rd	78	84	.481	12		
1997	MLB	AL	West	4th	65	97	.401	25		
1998	MLB	AL	West	4th	74	88	.457	14		Ben Grieve (ROY)
1999	MLB	AL	West	2nd	87	75	.537	8		
2000	MLB	AL	West ^	1st	91	70	.565	—	Lost ALDS (Yankees) 3–2	Jason Giambi (MVP)
2001	MLB	AL	West	2nd ¤	102	60	.630	14	Lost ALDS (Yankees) 3–2	
2002	MLB	AL	West ^	1st	103	59	.636	—	Lost ALDS (Twins) 3–2	Miguel Tejada (MVP); Barry Zito (CYA)
2003	MLB	AL	West ^	1st	96	66	.593	—	Lost ALDS (Red Sox) 3–2	
2004	MLB	AL	West	2nd	91	71	.562	1		Bobby Crosby (ROY)
2005	MLB	AL	West	2nd	88	74	.543	7		Huston Street (ROY)
2006	MLB	AL	West ^	1st	93	69	.574	—	Won ALDS (Twins) 3–0; Lost ALCS (Tigers) 4–0	
2007	MLB	AL	West	3rd	76	86	.469	18		
2008	MLB	AL	West	3rd	75	86	.466	24½		
2009	MLB	AL	West	4th	75	87	.463	22		Andrew Bailey (ROY)
2010	MLB	AL	West	2nd	81	81	.500	9		
2011	MLB	AL	West	3rd	74	88	.457	22		
2012	MLB	AL	West ^	1st	94	68	.580	—	Lost ALDS (Tigers) 3–2	Bob Melvin (MOY)
2013	MLB	AL	West ^	1st	96	66	.593	—	Lost ALDS (Tigers) 3–2	
2014	MLB	AL	West	2nd ¤	88	74	.543	10	Lost ALWC (Royals)	
2015	MLB	AL	West	5th	68	94	.420	20		
2016	MLB	AL	West	5th	69	93	.426	26		
2017	MLB	AL	West	5th	75	87	.463	26		
2018	MLB	AL	West	2nd ¤	97	65	.599	6	Lost ALWC (Yankees)	Bob Melvin (MOY)
2019	MLB	AL	West	2nd ¤	97	65	.599	10	Lost ALWC (Rays)	
2020	MLB	AL	West ^	1st	36	24	.600	—	Won ALWC (White Sox) 2–1; Lost ALDS (Astros) 3–1	Liam Hendriks (RPOY)
2021	MLB	AL	West	3rd	86	76	.531	9		
2022	MLB	AL	West	5th	60	102	.370	46		
2023	MLB	AL	West	5th	50	112	.309	40		
2024	MLB	AL	West	4th	69	93	.426	19½		
Athletics
2025	MLB	AL	West	4th	76	86	.469	14		Nick Kurtz (ROY)
Regular season					9260	9766	.488		29 Postseason Appearances	
Playoff games					85	82	.509		17 Division Titles, 15 League Pennants	
Playoff series					18	17	.514		9 World Series Championships	

== Record by decade ==
The following table describes the Athletics' MLB win–loss record by decade.

Decade	Wins	Losses	Pct
1900s	734	568	.564
1910s	710	774	.478
1920s	770	754	.505
1930s	723	795	.476
1940s	638	898	.415
1950s	624	915	.405
1960s	686	922	.427
1970s	838	772	.520
1980s	803	764	.512
1990s	773	781	.497
2000s	890	728	.550
2010s	839	781	.518
2020s	377	493	.433
All-time	9295	9731	.489

These statistics are from Baseball-Reference.com's Oakland Athletics History & Encyclopedia, and are current through 2021.

== Postseason record by year ==
The Athletics have made the postseason twenty-nine times in their history, with the first being in 1905 and the most recent being in 2020.

Postseason record by year
Year	Finish	Round	Opponent	Result		
1905	American League Champions	World Series	New York Giants	Lost	1	4
1910	World Series Champions	World Series	Chicago Cubs	Won	4	1
1911	World Series Champions	World Series	New York Giants	Won	4	2
1913	World Series Champions	World Series	New York Giants	Won	4	1
1914	American League Champions	World Series	Boston Braves	Lost	0	4
1929	World Series Champions	World Series	Chicago Cubs	Won	4	1
1930	World Series Champions	World Series	St Louis Cardinals	Won	4	2
1931	American League Champions	World Series	St Louis Cardinals	Lost	3	4
1971	American League West Champions	ALCS	Baltimore Orioles	Lost	0	3
1972	World Series Champions	ALCS	Detroit Tigers	Won	3	2
1972	World Series Champions	World Series	Cincinnati Reds	Won	4	3
1973	World Series Champions	ALCS	Baltimore Orioles	Won	3	2
1973	World Series Champions	World Series	New York Mets	Won	4	3
1974	World Series Champions	ALCS	Baltimore Orioles	Won	3	1
1974	World Series Champions	World Series	Los Angeles Dodgers	Won	4	1
1975	American League West Champions	ALCS	Boston Red Sox	Lost	0	3
1981	American League West Champions	ALDS	Kansas City Royals	Won	3	0
1981	American League West Champions	ALCS	New York Yankees	Lost	0	3
1988	American League Champions	ALCS	Boston Red Sox	Won	4	0
1988	American League Champions	World Series	Los Angeles Dodgers	Lost	1	4
1989	World Series Champions	ALCS	Toronto Blue Jays	Won	4	1
1989	World Series Champions	World Series	San Francisco Giants	Won	4	0
1990	American League Champions	ALCS	Boston Red Sox	Won	4	0
1990	American League Champions	World Series	Cincinnati Reds	Lost	0	4
1992	American League West Champions	ALCS	Toronto Blue Jays	Lost	2	4
2000	American League West Champions	ALDS	New York Yankees	Lost	2	3
2001	American League Wild Card	ALDS	New York Yankees	Lost	2	3
2002	American League West Champions	ALDS	Minnesota Twins	Lost	2	3
2003	American League West Champions	ALDS	Boston Red Sox	Lost	2	3
2006	American League West Champions	ALDS	Minnesota Twins	Won	3	0
2006	American League West Champions	ALCS	Detroit Tigers	Lost	0	4
2012	American League West Champions	ALDS	Detroit Tigers	Lost	2	3
2013	American League West Champions	ALDS	Detroit Tigers	Lost	2	3
2014	American League Wild Card	ALWC	Kansas City Royals	Lost	0	1
2018	American League Wild Card	ALWC	New York Yankees	Lost	0	1
2019	American League Wild Card	ALWC	Tampa Bay Rays	Lost	0	1
2020	American League West Champions	ALWC	Chicago White Sox	Won	2	1
2020	American League West Champions	ALDS	Houston Astros	Lost	1	3
29	Totals			18-20	85	82

== All-time records ==
	Total Games	Wins	Losses	Win %
Philadelphia Athletics regular season record (1901–1954)	8,134	3,886	4,248	.478
Kansas City Athletics regular season record (1955–1967)	2,053	829	1,224	.404
Oakland Athletics (1968–present)	8,677	4,495	4,182	.518
All-time regular season record	18,864	9,150	9,654	.488
All-time post-season record	167	85	82	.509
All-time regular and post-season record	19,031	9,235	9,736	.485

These statistics are from Baseball-Reference.com's Oakland Athletics History & Encyclopedia, and are current as of October 5, 2022.
