= 1913 New York Giants season =

Major League Baseball season

1913 New York Giants
- National League champions
- League: National League
- Ballpark: Polo Grounds
- City: New York City
- Record: 101–51 (.664)
- League place: 1st
- Owners: Harry Hempstead
- Managers: John McGraw

The 1913 New York Giants season was the franchise's 31st season. It involved the Giants winning the National League pennant for the third consecutive year. Led by manager John McGraw, the Giants dominated the NL and finished 12½ games in front of the second place Philadelphia Phillies. They were beaten by the Philadelphia Athletics in the World Series.

Ace pitcher Christy Mathewson went 25–11 and led the NL with a 2.06 ERA. Rube Marquard and Jeff Tesreau also won over 20 games, and the Giants easily allowed the fewest runs of any team in the league.

Taken together with the 1911 and 1912 pennant winners, this team is considered one of the greatest of all-time. The roster was basically unchanged from 1912.

== Regular season ==
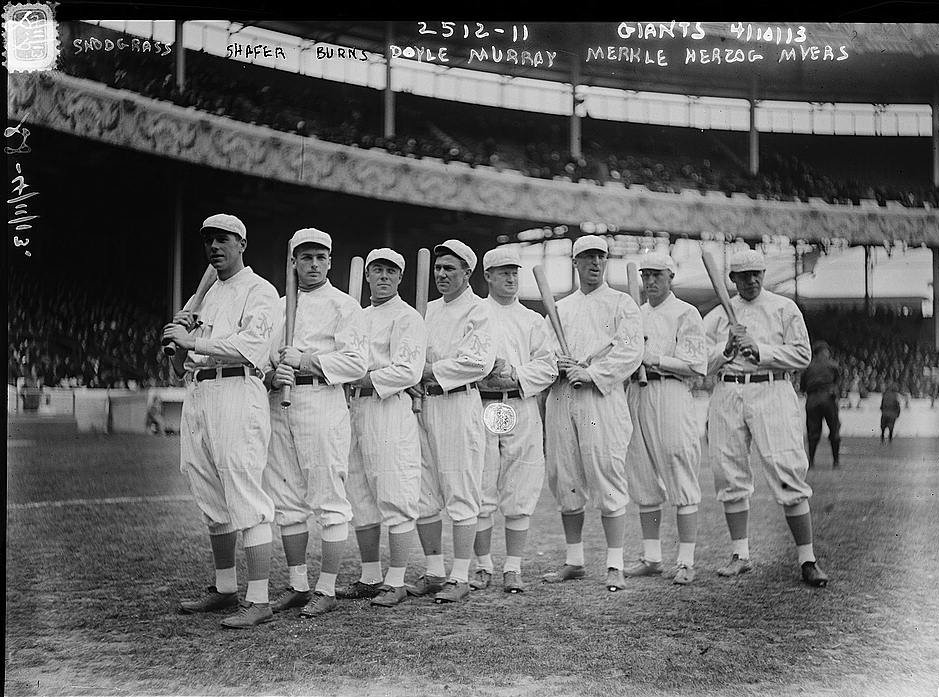
The Giants' opening day line-up at the Polo Grounds

=== Season standings ===
National League
Team	W	L	Pct.	GB	Home	Road
New York Giants	101	51	.664	—	54‍–‍23	47‍–‍28
Philadelphia Phillies	88	63	.583	12½	43‍–‍33	45‍–‍30
Chicago Cubs	88	65	.575	13½	51‍–‍25	37‍–‍40
Pittsburgh Pirates	78	71	.523	21½	41‍–‍35	37‍–‍36
Boston Braves	69	82	.457	31½	34‍–‍40	35‍–‍42
Brooklyn Dodgers	65	84	.436	34½	29‍–‍47	36‍–‍37
Cincinnati Reds	64	89	.418	37½	32‍–‍44	32‍–‍45
St. Louis Cardinals	51	99	.340	49	25‍–‍48	26‍–‍51

=== Record vs. opponents ===
1913 National League record Sources:
Team	BSN	BRO	CHC	CIN	NYG	PHI	PIT	STL
Boston	—	10–10–1	9–13	8–14	8–14	7–15–1	11–10	16–6–1
Brooklyn	10–10–1	—	9–13	9–13	8–14	8–13–1	8–14–1	13–7
Chicago	13–9	13–9	—	13–9–1	7–14	13–9	13–9	16–6–1
Cincinnati	14–8	13–9	9–13–1	—	5–17	5–17–1	8–13–1	10–12
New York	14–8	14–8	14–7	17–5	—	14–8–3	14–8–1	14–7
Philadelphia	15–7–1	13–8–1	9–13	17–5–1	8–14–3	—	9–11–2	17–5
Pittsburgh	10–11	14–8–1	9–13	13–8–1	8–14–1	11–9–2	—	13–8–1
St. Louis	6–16–1	7–13	6–16–1	12–10	7–14	5–17	8–13–1	—

=== Notable transactions ===
- September 15, 1913: Rule 5 draft
  - Ben Dyer was drafted by the Giants from the Decatur Commodores.
  - Hank Ritter was drafted by the Giants from the Wilmington Chicks.

=== Roster ===
1913 New York Giants roster
Roster
Pitchers: Red Ames; Doc Crandall; Al Demaree; Art Fromme; Bunny Hearn; Rube Marquard; Christy Mathewson; Rube Schauer; Ferdie Schupp; Jeff Tesreau; Hooks Wiltse	Catchers: Grover Hartley; Larry McLean; Chief Meyers; Art Wilson; Infielders: Larry Doyle; Art Fletcher; Eddie Grant; Heinie Groh; Buck Herzog; Fred Merkle; Tillie Shafer; Milt Stock	Outfielders: George Burns; Claude Cooper; Josh Devore; Moose McCormick; John Merritt; Red Murray; Fred Snodgrass; Jim Thorpe; Other batters: Joe Evers	Manager: John McGraw; Coaches: Wilbert Robinson

== Player stats ==
=== Batting ===
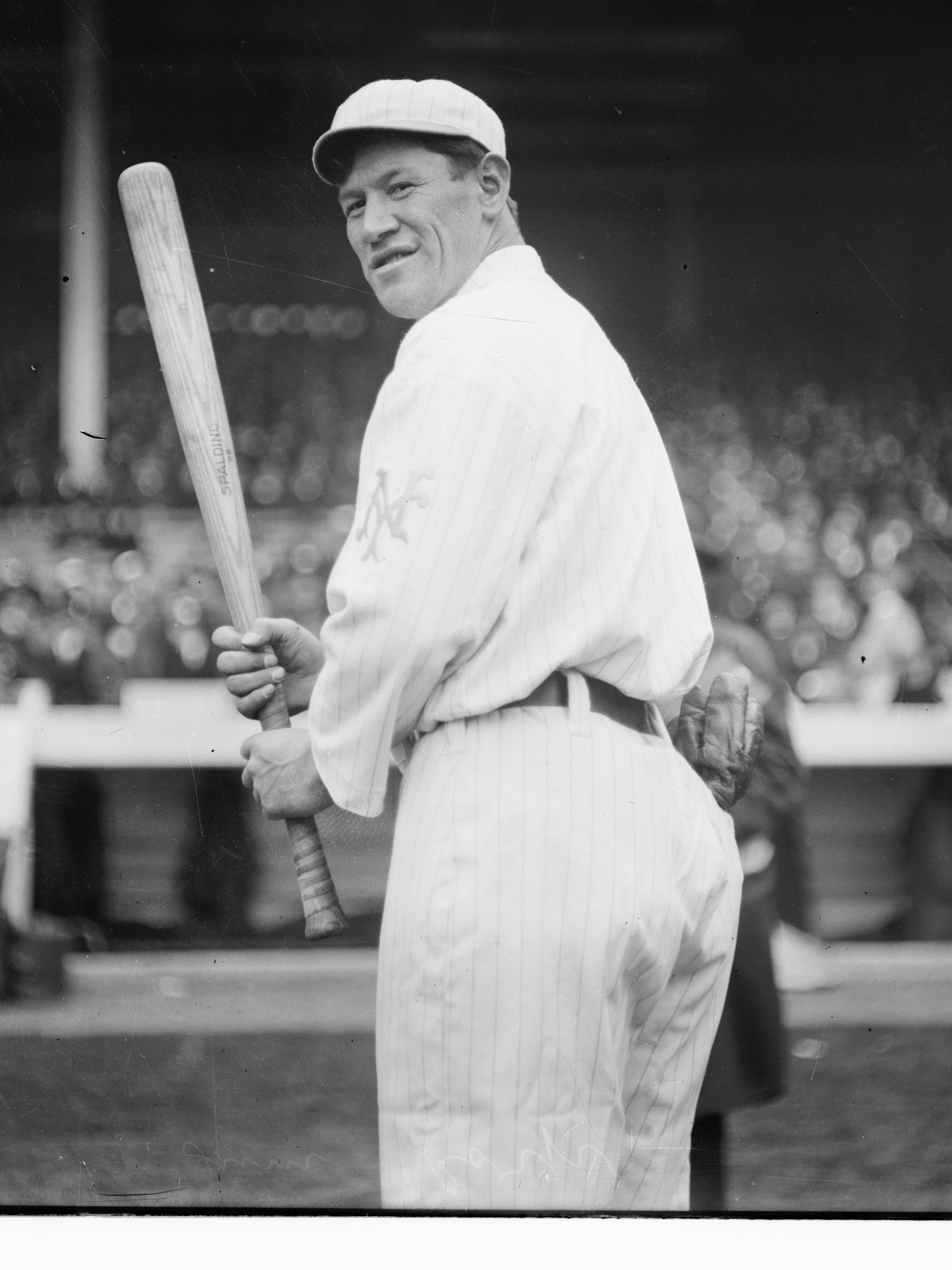
Jim Thorpe at the Polo Grounds

==== Starters by position ====
Note: Pos = Position; G = Games played; AB = At bats; H = Hits; Avg. = Batting average; HR = Home runs; RBI = Runs batted in

Pos	Player	G	AB	H	Avg.	HR	RBI
C	Chief Meyers	120	378	118	.312	3	47
1B	Fred Merkle	153	563	147	.261	3	69
2B	Larry Doyle	132	482	135	.280	5	73
SS	Art Fletcher	136	538	160	.297	4	71
3B	Buck Herzog	96	290	83	.286	3	31
OF	Fred Snodgrass	141	457	133	.291	3	49
OF	Red Murray	147	520	139	.267	2	59
OF	George Burns	150	605	173	.286	2	54

==== Other batters ====
Note: G = Games played; AB = At bats; H = Hits; Avg. = Batting average; HR = Home runs; RBI = Runs batted in

Player	G	AB	H	Avg.	HR	RBI
Tillie Shafer	138	508	146	.287	5	52
Moose McCormick	57	80	22	.275	0	15
Art Wilson	54	79	15	.190	0	8
Larry McLean	30	75	24	.320	0	9
Jim Thorpe	19	35	5	.143	1	2
Claude Cooper	27	30	9	.300	0	4
Josh Devore	16	21	4	.190	0	1
Eddie Grant	27	20	4	.200	0	1
Grover Hartley	23	19	6	.316	0	0
Milt Stock	7	17	3	.176	0	1
Heinie Groh	4	2	0	.000	0	0
John Merritt	1	0	0	----	0	0
Joe Evers	1	0	0	----	0	0

=== Pitching ===
==== Starting pitchers ====
Note: G = Games pitched; IP = Innings pitched; W = Wins; L = Losses; ERA = Earned run average; SO = Strikeouts

Player	G	IP	W	L	ERA	SO
Christy Mathewson	40	306.0	25	11	2.06	93
Rube Marquard	42	288.0	23	10	2.50	151
Jeff Tesreau	41	282.0	22	13	2.17	167
Al Demaree	31	199.2	13	4	2.21	76
Bunny Hearn	2	13.0	1	1	2.77	8

==== Other pitchers ====
Note: G = Games pitched; IP = Innings pitched; W = Wins; L = Losses; ERA = Earned run average; SO = Strikeouts

Player	G	IP	W	L	ERA	SO
Art Fromme	26	112.1	11	6	4.01	50
Red Ames	8	41.2	2	1	2.16	30
Rube Schauer	3	12.0	0	1	7.50	7

==== Relief pitchers ====
Note: G = Games pitched; W = Wins; L = Losses; SV = Saves; ERA = Earned run average; SO = Strikeouts

Player	G	W	L	SV	ERA	SO
Doc Crandall	35	4	4	6	2.86	42
Hooks Wiltse	17	0	0	3	1.56	25
Ferdie Schupp	5	0	0	0	0.75	2

== 1913 World Series ==
=== Game 1 ===
October 7, 1913, at the Polo Grounds in New York City

Team	1	2	3	4	5	6	7	8	9	R	H	E
Philadelphia	0	0	0	3	2	0	0	1	0	6	11	1
New York	0	0	1	0	3	0	0	0	0	4	11	0
W: Chief Bender (1–0) L: Rube Marquard (0–1)
HR: PHI – Frank Baker (1)

=== Game 2 ===
October 8, 1913, at Shibe Park in Philadelphia

Team	1	2	3	4	5	6	7	8	9	10	R	H	E
New York	0	0	0	0	0	0	0	0	0	3	3	7	2
Philadelphia	0	0	0	0	0	0	0	0	0	0	0	8	2
W: Christy Mathewson (1–0) L: Eddie Plank (0–1)

=== Game 3 ===
October 9, 1913, at the Polo Grounds in New York City

Team	1	2	3	4	5	6	7	8	9	R	H	E
Philadelphia	3	2	0	0	0	0	2	1	0	8	12	1
New York	0	0	0	0	1	0	1	0	0	2	5	1
W: Bullet Joe Bush (1–0) L: Jeff Tesreau (0–1)
HR: PHI – Wally Schang (1)

=== Game 4 ===
October 10, 1913, at Shibe Park in Philadelphia

Team	1	2	3	4	5	6	7	8	9	R	H	E
New York	0	0	0	0	0	0	3	2	0	5	8	2
Philadelphia	0	1	0	3	2	0	0	0	x	6	9	0
W: Chief Bender (2–0) L: Al Demaree (0–1)
HR: NYG – Fred Merkle (1)

=== Game 5 ===
October 11, 1913, at the Polo Grounds in New York City

Team	1	2	3	4	5	6	7	8	9	R	H	E
Philadelphia	1	0	2	0	0	0	0	0	0	3	6	1
New York	0	0	0	0	1	0	0	0	0	1	2	2
W: Eddie Plank (1–1) L: Christy Mathewson (1–1)
