= Cruthers =

Cruthers is a surname. Notable people with the surname include:

- James Cruthers (1924–2015), Australian businessman and philanthropist
- Press Cruthers (1890–1976), American baseball player
- Ryan Cruthers (born 1984), American ice hockey player and coach
