= Wally Schang =

American baseball player (1889–1965)

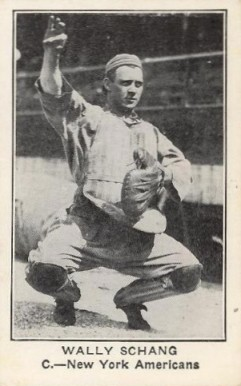
- Catcher
- Born: August 22, 1889; South Wales, New York, U.S.
- Died: March 6, 1965 (aged 75); St. Louis, Missouri, U.S.
- Batted: Switch Threw: Right

MLB debut
- May 9, 1913, for the Philadelphia Athletics

Last MLB appearance
- June 22, 1931, for the Detroit Tigers

MLB statistics
- Batting average: .284
- Home runs: 59
- Runs batted in: 710
- Stats at Baseball Reference

Teams
- Philadelphia Athletics (1913–1917); Boston Red Sox (1918–1920); New York Yankees (1921–1925); St. Louis Browns (1926–1929); Philadelphia Athletics (1930); Detroit Tigers (1931)

Career highlights and awards
- 4× World Series champion (1913, 1918, 1923, 1930)

Walter Henry Schang (August 22, 1889 – March 6, 1965) was an American professional baseball player and manager. He played in Major League Baseball as a catcher from 1913 to 1931 for the Philadelphia Athletics, Boston Red Sox, New York Yankees, St. Louis Browns and the Detroit Tigers. Schang was considered one of the best major league catchers of his era--offensively and defensively.

Schang was the starting catcher for six American League pennant winning teams (Philadelphia Athletics (1913–1914), Boston Red Sox (1918), New York Yankees (1921–1923). He was a switch-hitter who batted above .300 six times during his playing career and posted a career .393 on-base percentage, second only to Mickey Cochrane among major league catchers. In 1916 he became the first Major League Baseball player to hit a home run from both sides of the plate in the same game.

Standing 5-foot-10 inches tall and weighing 180 pounds, Schang was one of the new breed of catchers that emerged from the Deadball Era who used speed and agility to field their position. His reputation as a defensive stand out is enhanced because of the era in which he played. In the Deadball Era, catchers played a huge defensive role, given the large number of bunts and stolen base attempts, as well as the difficulty of handling every type of pitch imaginable, such as shine balls, spitballs, knuckleballs, and emery balls.

== Career ==
Schang was born on August 22, 1889, in South Wales, New York, a small town approximately 25 miles southeast of Buffalo. His parents were farmers. In 1912, while he was playing in the sandlots of upstate New York for the Buffalo Pullmans, he was discovered by George Stallings, who went on to manage the 1914 Miracle Braves. Schang began his major league career with the Philadelphia Athletics on May 9, 1913 at the age of 23. He played in 79 games and had a slashline of .266/.392/.415 (batting average/on-base percentage/slugging percentage) while walking 34 times and totaling 44 strikeouts. He finished eighth in the MVP voting. That year, the Athletics won the American League pennant and played in the 1913 World Series (the first of six appearances for Schang). In the five-game defeat of the New York Giants, he hit .357 with five hits and seven RBIs in the four games he played. He hit a home run in Game 3 (his only postseason home run). He played 107 games the following year and batted .287/.371/.404 with 45 RBIs while reducing his strikeouts to 33 (which nearly matched his walks of 32). For the fourth time in five seasons, the Athletics won the league pennant. They faced the Boston Braves, who were managed by Schang's mentor, George Stallings. The Braves would later be known as the "Miracle Braves" as they conducted a shocking sweep of Philadelphia. In the four-game sweep, he hit .167 with two hits.

The next three years for the Athletics and Schang were miserable, since manager/owner Connie Mack sold numerous pieces of his title teams to stay afloat (with the exception of players like Schang). He batted a combined .266/.369/.391 in those seasons with 118 RBIs while receiving more walks (133) than strikeouts (115). He was sold to the Boston Red Sox before the 1918 season. He played in 88 games (of a season shortened to send in September due to World War I) that year. While he batted .244, he maintained a consistent walk rate with 46 to 35 strikeouts while the Red Sox made the 1918 World Series. He played in five of the six games and batted .444 with four hits and an RBI. Schang was the regular catcher for that club, the last Red Sox team to win the title 2004. Soon afterwards, Boston owner Harry Frazee sold Babe Ruth to the New York Yankees. He played 113 games in 1919 and batted .306 while reaching base at a .436 clip with 71 walks to 42 strikeouts with 101 hits (the first time he cracked the century mark in that category). In 1920, he hit .305/.413 with 64 walks to 37 strikeouts with another 50 RBI season (51) and 100-hit season (118). Schang followed Ruth in 1921 to the Yankees, becoming the first in the great string of Yankee catchers, including Bill Dickey, Yogi Berra, Elston Howard and Thurman Munson.

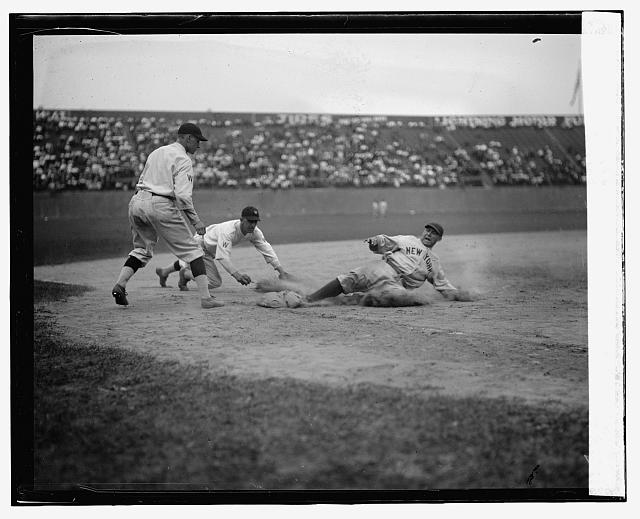
Yankees catcher Wally Schang slides safely into third base. Senators' third baseman is Ossie Bluege and pitcher backing up play is Firpo Marberry.

Schang served as the Yankees' regular catcher for three straight American League pennants. He played a career high in games played with 134 in 1921, and he batted .316/.428/.453 with a career high 78 walks (to 35 strikeouts) with 53 RBIs and 134 hits (also a career high). The Yankees made it to the 1921 World Series for the first time in history that year, facing the Giants. In eight games, Schang threw out 9 attempted stolen bases and batted .286 with six hits and one RBI (his last), but the Yankees lost the Series. He played 124 games in 1922 with a .319/.405/.412 slashline with 52 RBIs, 130 hits, 53 walks and 36 strikeouts while finishing 13th in MVP voting. In the 1922 World Series (also against New York), he played five games and batted .188 with three hits in the series loss. He played just 84 games in 1923, batting .276 with 75 hits. In the 1923 World Series (another rematch with New York), the Yankees and Schang were victorious at last, and he batted .318 in six games with seven hits. In 1924, he played 114 games while batting .292/.382/.427 with 104 hits and 51 RBIs while finishing 11th in the MVP voting. The following year was his last with New York, and he played just 73 games with a .240/.310/.335 slashline. After the year, he moved to the St. Louis Browns, hitting a career-high .330 in his first season with St. Louis, as the team improved greatly, managing first-division finishes in 1928 and 1929. The following year, Schang returned to Philadelphia as a backup for Mickey Cochrane. The Athletics of 1930 were coming off a World Championship and repeated that year. It was the fourth title for Schang in his career, which ended the next season with the Detroit Tigers. He finished his career in 1931 at the age of 41, playing thirty games with fourteen hits.

In a 19-season career, Schang hit a .284 batting average with 59 home runs and 710 RBI in 1,842 games played. In 32 World Series games, he hit .287 (27-for-94) with one home run and eight RBI's.

When Schang was not catching, his managers usually played him in center field, right, or at third base, in order to keep his bat in the lineup. Schang's defensive work was also regarded as outstanding, although he holds the American League career record for most errors by a catcher, with 223.

== After baseball ==
Following his major league career, Schang played for several seasons with Western Association and Canadian clubs and then turned to managing in the minor leagues. In 1945, he retired to a farm he operated near Dixon, Missouri, in the Ozark Mountains. His wife, Dorothy, operated a beauty shop in Clayton, Missouri.

Schang died on March 6, 1965 at St. Luke's Hospital in Chesterfield, Missouri at the age of 75.

== Legacy ==
In a nineteen-year major league career, Schang played in 1,842 games, accumulating 1,506 hits in 5,307 at bats for a .284 career batting average along with 59 home runs, 705 runs batted in and an on-base percentage of .393. He hit above .300 in six times during his career and appeared in at least 100 games in 10 seasons while being considered one of the premier catchers of the deadball era. In his book, The Bill James Historical Baseball Abstract, baseball historian Bill James ranked Schang 20th all-time among major league catchers. However, he fell short in the Baseball Hall of Fame ballot five times by the BBWAA voting (1948, 1950, 1956, 1958, 1960), receiving a peak of 4.1%.

1916 saw him have both a 20-game hitting streak and the first occasion of a player hitting home runs from both sides of the plate in the same game (September 9, 1916) Schang holds an American League game-record for catchers throwing out six potential base stealers (May 12, 1915) along with the league record for catchers with eight assists in a game (May 12, 1920). He caught pitches from numerous leading pitchers of the league in the first two decades of the 20th century, which included future Hall of Famers Chief Bender, Lefty Grove, Waite Hoyt, Herb Pennock, Eddie Plank and Babe Ruth.

Nearly a century after he retired, he still ranks highly among the all-time list of most career stolen bases at his position with 121 (12th all-time among players with at least 60 percent of their games at the position), behind Roger Bresnahan (212), Wilbert Robinson (196), Jason Kendall (189), Ray Schalk (177), Red Dooin (133), Carlton Fisk (128), Iván Rodríguez (127), and Johnny Kling (124).

== Trivia ==
- In the early 20th century, as players with facial hair became a rarity in baseball, Wally Schang became the last major leaguer to sport a moustache, in 1914. After that, no other major leaguer had a moustache until 1936, when the Brooklyn Dodgers allowed Frenchy Bordagaray to keep the moustache he had grown when appearing in a small part in John Ford's The Prisoner of Shark Island during the offseason. After a few months, however, his manager, Casey Stengel, told him to shave it off, telling Bordagaray "If anyone's going to be a clown on this club, it's going to be me." No other major leaguers wore a moustache during the regular season until Dick Allen (St. Louis Cardinals) and Felipe Alou (Oakland Athletics) did so in 1970.
