= Tillie Shafer =

American baseball player

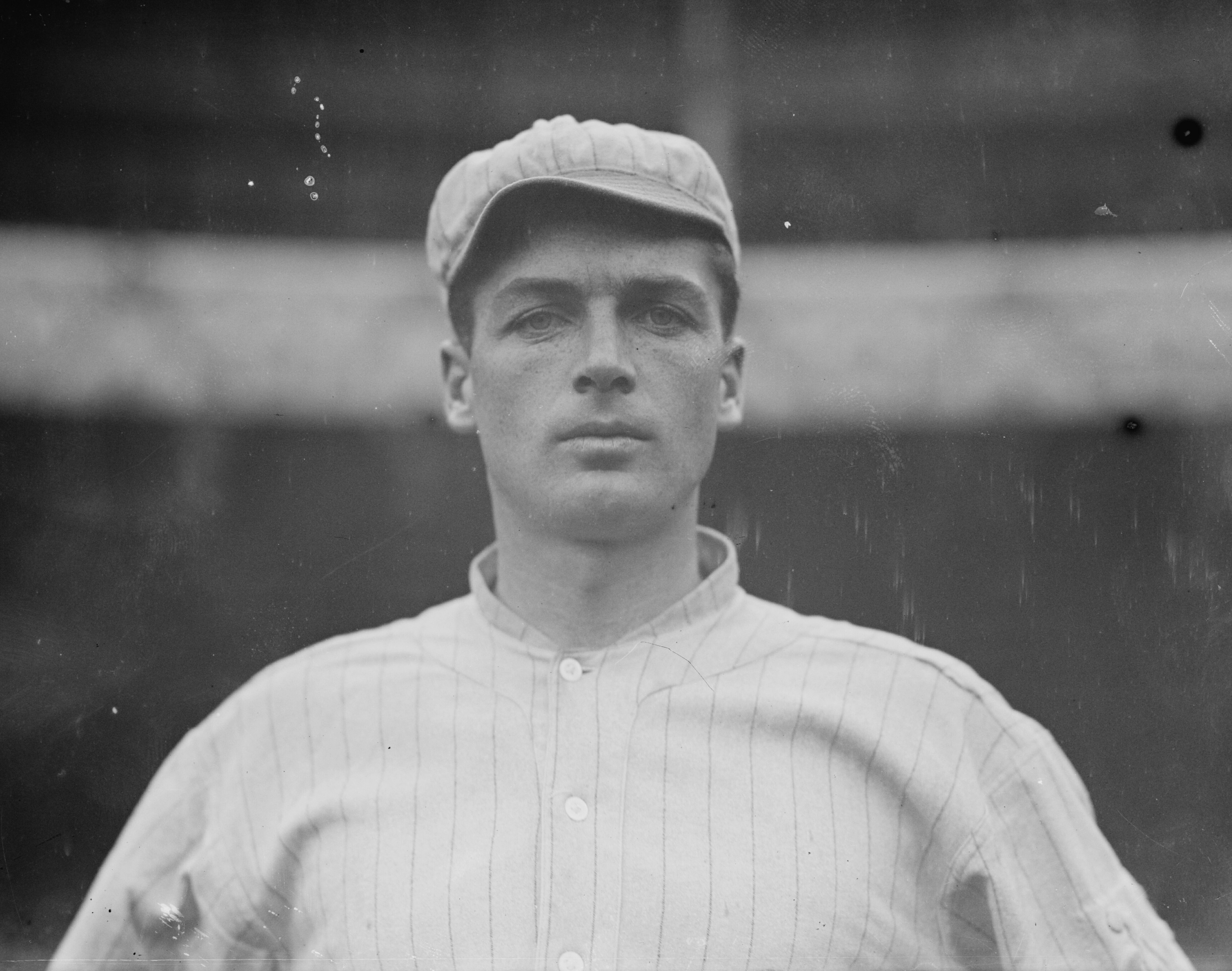
- Infielder
- Born: March 22, 1889; Los Angeles, California, U.S.
- Died: January 10, 1962 (aged 72); Los Angeles, California, U.S.
- Batted: Switch Threw: Right

MLB debut
- April 24, 1909, for the New York Giants

Last MLB appearance
- October 4, 1913, for the New York Giants

MLB statistics
- Batting average: .273
- Home runs: 5
- Runs batted in: 84
- Stats at Baseball Reference

Teams
- New York Giants (1909–1910, 1912–1913)

Arthur Joseph "Tillie" Shafer (March 22, 1889 – January 10, 1962) was an American professional baseball player. He appeared in the major leagues as an infielder with the New York Giants between 1909 and 1913.

== Career ==
While attending Santa Clara University, Shafer was one of the most accomplished college athletes on the west coast, winning numerous track and field medals, in addition for playing baseball for the then-Missionites of Santa Clara. He was once timed at 3.2 seconds running from the batter's box to first base.

However, his time in major league baseball wasn't very happy for him. A young, shy man from a wealthy family, Shafer was hassled from the moment he first entered the Giants' clubhouse as a rookie. Outfielder Cy Seymour gave him the feminine nickname "Tillie", which stuck. Throughout his tenure in New York, Shafer was branded as a "momma's boy" and razzed by his teammates.

After two seasons of mostly sitting on the bench, Shafer took 1911 off, having arrived back home after sailing to Japan to instruct a university baseball team. He then studied at Stanford University. He returned the following season, and in 1913, he was a regular in the Giants' starting line-up for the first time. He got to play in the 1912 World Series. In the after-events of the decisive Game 8, teammates ragged on Fred Snodgrass for a dropped fly ball that had Shafer leap to his defense for heated confrontations. Shafer decided to retire for a time before returning in 1913. He closed his career with the 1913 World Series.

In 283 games over four seasons, Shafer posted a .273 batting average (212-for-776) with 138 runs, 5 home runs, 84 RBIs, 60 stolen bases and 105 bases on balls.

On December 16, 1913, Shafer announced his retirement. He cited the need to get to work on the holdings of his father along with his dislike of the New York life in baseball, stating as such: "I have satisfied every ambition in a baseball way. Now I want to forget I was ever in it. It is an episode in my life that I am trying hard to forget." McGraw kept asking him to return to the team for a number of years, and Shafer was not formally released until 1926. He admitted later in life, "I shouldn’t have broken and run that way. I’ve been sorry ever since.”

== See also ==
- List of baseball players who went directly to Major League Baseball
