= Joe Giebel =

American baseball player (1891-1981)

- Catcher
- Born: November 30, 1891; Washington, D.C., U.S.
- Died: March 17, 1981 (aged 89); Silver Spring, Maryland, U.S.
- Batted: Right Threw: Right

MLB debut
- September 30, 1913, for the Philadelphia Athletics

Last MLB appearance
- September 30, 1913, for the Philadelphia Athletics

MLB statistics
- Batting average: .333
- Hits: 1
- Runs batted in: 0
- Stats at Baseball Reference

Teams
- Philadelphia Athletics (1913)

Joseph Henry Giebel (November 30, 1891 – March 17, 1981) was an American Major League Baseball catcher. He played for the Philadelphia Athletics during the 1913 season.
