= Bullet Joe Bush =

American baseball player (1892–1974)

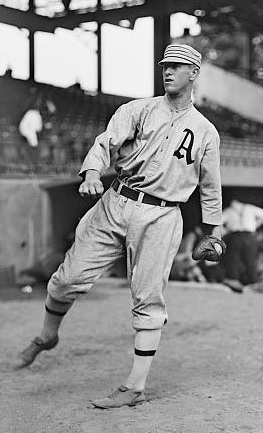
- Bush in 1914
- Pitcher
- Born: November 27, 1892; Brainerd, Minnesota, U.S.
- Died: November 1, 1974 (aged 81); Fort Lauderdale, Florida, U.S.
- Batted: Right Threw: Right

MLB debut
- September 30, 1912, for the Philadelphia Athletics

Last MLB appearance
- August 22, 1928, for the Philadelphia Athletics

MLB statistics
- Win–loss record: 195–183
- Earned run average: 3.51
- Strikeouts: 1,318
- Stats at Baseball Reference

Teams
- Philadelphia Athletics (1912–1917); Boston Red Sox (1918–1921); New York Yankees (1922–1924); St. Louis Browns (1925); Washington Senators (1926); Pittsburgh Pirates (1926–1927); New York Giants (1927); Philadelphia Athletics (1928)

Career highlights and awards
- 3x World Series champion (1913, 1918, 1923); Pitched a no-hitter on August 26, 1916

Leslie Ambrose "Bullet Joe" Bush (November 27, 1892 – November 1, 1974) was an American Major League Baseball pitcher with the Philadelphia Athletics, Boston Red Sox, New York Yankees, St. Louis Browns, Washington Senators, Pittsburgh Pirates, and New York Giants between 1912 and 1928. Bush batted and threw right-handed. He is credited with having developed the forkball pitch.

== Career ==
Bush helped the Athletics win the 1913 World Series and the 1914 American League pennant, the Red Sox win the 1918 World Series, the Yankees win the 1922 AL pennant and 1923 World Series, and the Pirates win the 1927 National League pennant.

Bush led the American League in losses (24) in 1916, walks allowed (109) in 1924, and wild pitches in 1916 (15), 1923 (12), and 1924 (7). While with the Athletics in 1916, when he led the league in losses, he won 15 games; the entire team won only 36 during what was then a Major League-worst 36-117 (.235 won-loss percentage) season. This was 41.7% of the team's total wins. On August 26 of that season, Bush no-hit the Cleveland Indians 5–0 at Shibe Park; a first inning, leadoff walk to Jack Graney was the only baserunner that kept him from a perfect game.

Bush finished fourth in voting for the 1922 American League MVP, as he led the league in winning percentage (.788). He also had a 26–7 win–loss record, 255 1/3 innings pitched, 85 walks allowed, 92 strikeouts, and a 3.31 earned run average.

Over a 17-year career, Bush had a 195–183 win–loss record, 488 games, 370 games started, 225 complete games, 35 shutouts, 93 games finished, 20 saves, 3,085 1/3 innings pitched, 2,990 hits allowed, 1,439 runs allowed, 1,203 earned runs allowed, 96 home runs allowed, 1,263 walks allowed, 1,318 strikeouts, 63 hit batsmen, 87 wild pitches, 13,053 batters faced, 1 balk, and a 3.51 earned run average.

Bush was also a very good hitting pitcher in his career, batting .253 (313-for-1239) with 128 runs, 7 home runs, and 140 RBI. He made 80 appearances as a pinch-hitter and was also used in the outfield.

Bush died in Fort Lauderdale, Florida at the age of 81 on November 1, 1974.

== See also ==
- List of Major League Baseball no-hitters

Preceded by Rube Foster	No-hitter pitcher August 26, 1916	Succeeded by Dutch Leonard
