= Rube Schauer =

Russian baseball player (1891–1957)

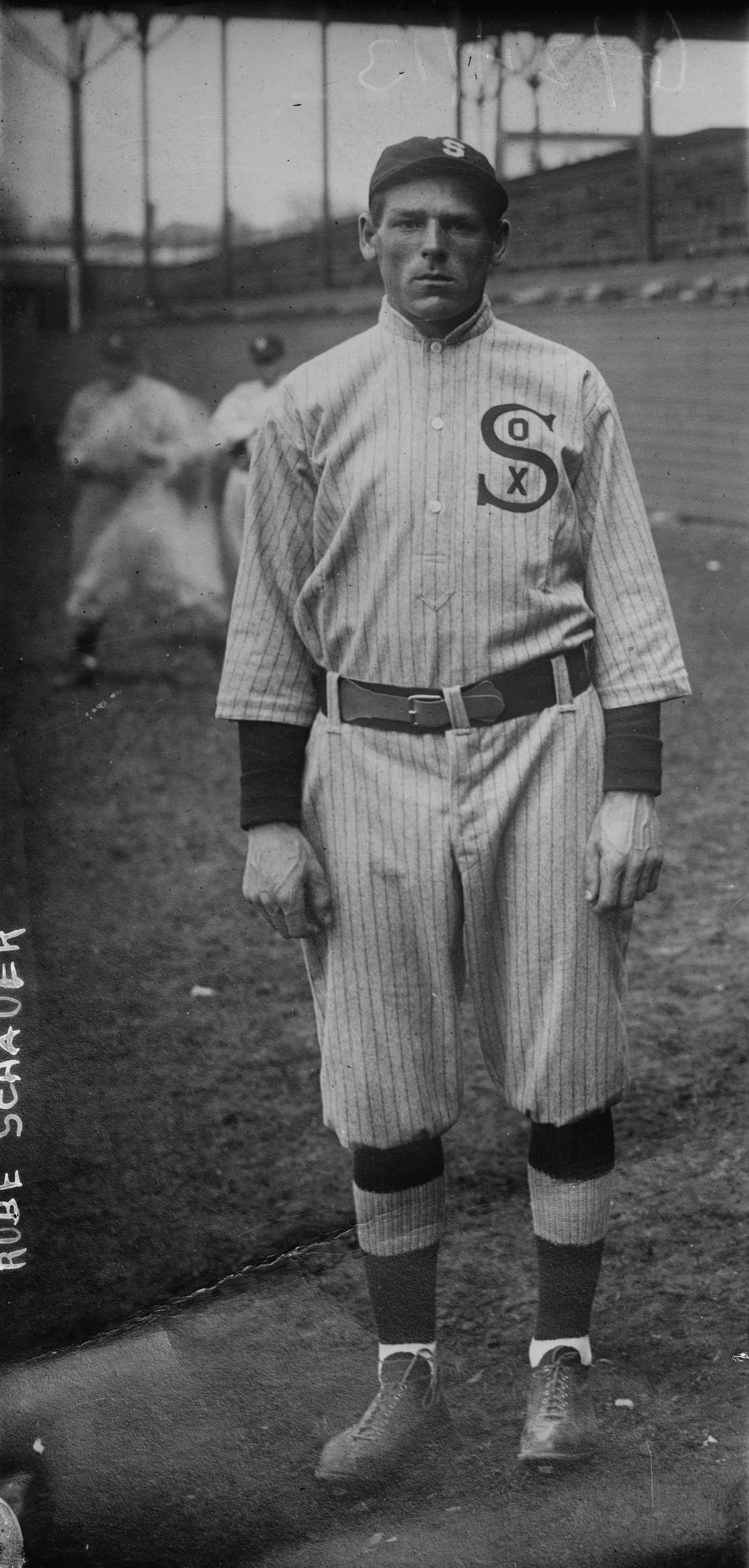
- Pitcher
- Born: March 19, 1891; Russian Empire
- Died: April 15, 1957 (aged 66); Minneapolis, Minnesota, U.S.
- Batted: Right Threw: Right

MLB debut
- August 27, 1913, for the New York Giants

Last MLB appearance
- September 29, 1917, for the Philadelphia Athletics

MLB statistics
- Win–loss record: 10-29
- Earned run average: 3.35
- Strikeouts: 164
- Stats at Baseball Reference

Teams
- New York Giants (1913–1916); Philadelphia Athletics (1917)

Alexander John "Rube" Schauer (March 19, 1891 – April 15, 1957) was a Major League Baseball player who played pitcher from 1913 to 1917. Schauer played for the New York Giants and Philadelphia Athletics.
