= List of World Series champions =

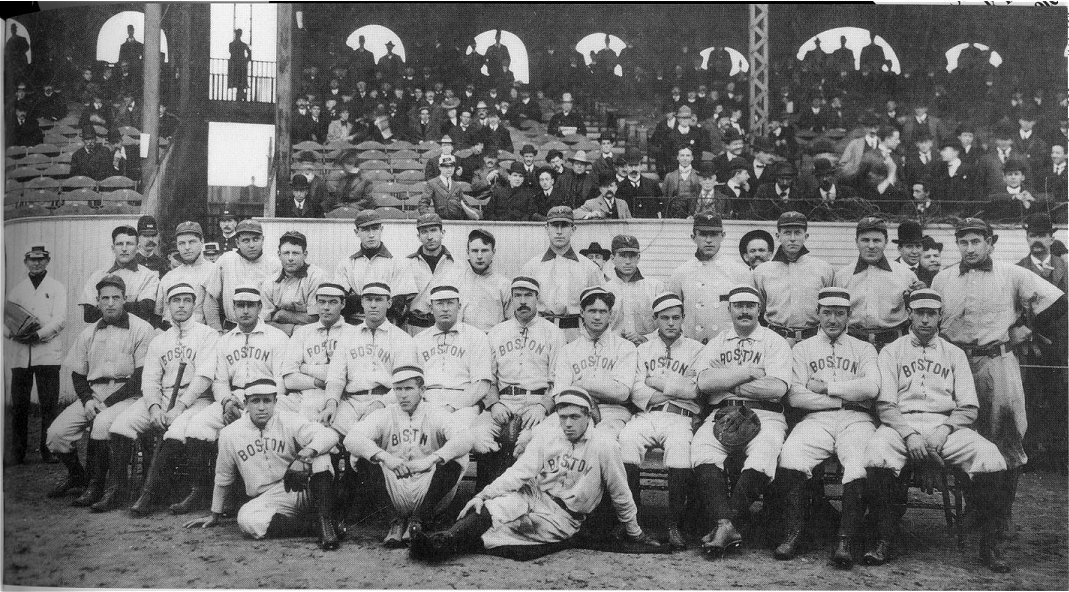
In the first World Series in 1903, the Boston Americans (front row) defeated the Pittsburgh Pirates (back row) 5–3 in a best-of-nine series.

The World Series is the annual championship series of Major League Baseball (MLB) and concludes the MLB postseason. First played in 1903, the World Series championship is a best-of-seven playoff and is a contest between the champions of baseball's National League (NL) and American League (AL). Often referred to as the "Fall Classic", the modern World Series has been played every year since 1903 with two exceptions: in 1904, when the NL champion New York Giants declined to play the AL champion Boston Americans; and in 1994, when the series was canceled due to the players' strike. The best-of-seven style has been the format of all World Series except in 1903, 1919, 1920, and 1921, when the winner was determined through a best-of-nine playoff. Although the large majority of contests have been played entirely during the month of October, a small number of Series have also had games played during September and November. Since 1967, the winning team has been awarded the Commissioner's Trophy. Players, coaches and others associated with the team are generally given World Series rings to commemorate their victory; however, they have received other items such as pocket watches and medallions in the past.

A total of 122 World Series have been contested through 2026, with the AL champion winning 68 and the NL champion winning 54. The New York Yankees of the AL have played in 41 World Series, winning 27 – the most championship appearances and most victories by any MLB team. The Los Angeles Dodgers and the Yankees are tied for the most losses with 14 each. The St. Louis Cardinals have won 11 championships, the most among NL clubs and second-most all-time behind the Yankees. The Dodgers have represented the NL the most in the World Series with 23 appearances. The Seattle Mariners are the only MLB franchise that has never appeared in a World Series; the San Diego Padres, Tampa Bay Rays, and Colorado Rockies have all played in the Series but have never won it, with the Padres appearing twice, and Rays appearing three times. The Los Angeles Angels and Washington Nationals won their only World Series appearance, and the Miami Marlins are the only team with multiple World Series appearances and no losses with two. The Toronto Blue Jays are the only franchise from outside the United States to appear in and win a World Series, winning in 1992 and 1993. The Houston Astros and Milwaukee Brewers have represented both the NL and AL in the World Series, with the Astros playing in 2005 for the NL and four times (2017, 2019, 2021, 2022) for the AL, while the Brewers played in 1982 for the AL and 2026 for the NL. The 1919 and 2017 World Series were both marred with cheating scandals: the Black Sox Scandal and the Houston Astros sign stealing scandal. The most recent World Series champions are the Milwaukee Brewers.

The last team to repeat as champions was the Dodgers in 2025. Two World Series matchups (in 1982 and 2005) have no current possibility of a rematch due to one of the contending teams switching to the opposing league – the Milwaukee Brewers moved to the NL in 1998, and the Houston Astros moved to the AL in 2013.

== Results ==
Numbers in parentheses in the table are World Series appearances as of the date of that World Series, and are used as follows:

- Winning team and Losing team columns indicate the number of times that team has appeared in a World Series as well as each respective team's World Series record to date.
National League team (NL)
American League team (AL)

| Year | Winning team | Manager | Series | Losing team | Manager |
|---|---|---|---|---|---|
| 1903 (Note: The 1903 World Series was an informal agreement between the two participating clubs and was not officially sanctioned by their respective leagues. It is nonetheless considered by MLB to be the first modern World Series.) | Boston Americans (1, 1–0) | Jimmy Collins | 5–3^{[V]} | Pittsburgh Pirates (1, 0–1) | Fred Clarke |
| 1904 (Note: There was no formal arrangement in place between the two leagues regarding the staging of the World Series, so the Giants owner John T. Brush refused to play against a team from what he considered an inferior league.) | (not played) (Note: Had the 1904 World Series been played, it would have pitted the AL champion Boston Americans against the NL champion New York Giants) | | | | |
| 1905 (Note: First World Series in which a formal agreement between the American and National League is in place, officially establishing the World Series as an annual postseason contest.) | New York Giants (1, 1–0) | John McGraw | 4–1 | Philadelphia Athletics (1, 0–1) | Connie Mack |
| 1906 | Chicago White Sox (1, 1–0) | Fielder Jones | 4–2 | Chicago Cubs (1, 0–1) | Frank Chance |
| 1907 | Chicago Cubs (2, 1–1) | Frank Chance | 4–0–1^{[T]} | Detroit Tigers (1, 0–1) | Hugh Jennings |
| 1908 | Chicago Cubs (3, 2–1) | Frank Chance | 4–1 | Detroit Tigers (2, 0–2) | Hugh Jennings |
| 1909 | Pittsburgh Pirates (2, 1–1) | Fred Clarke | 4–3 | Detroit Tigers (3, 0–3) | Hugh Jennings |
| 1910 | Philadelphia Athletics (2, 1–1) | Connie Mack | 4–1 | Chicago Cubs (4, 2–2) | Frank Chance |
| 1911 | Philadelphia Athletics (3, 2–1) | Connie Mack | 4–2 | New York Giants (2, 1–1) | John McGraw |
| 1912 | Boston Red Sox (2, 2–0) | Jake Stahl | 4–3–1^{[T]} | New York Giants (3, 1–2) | John McGraw |
| 1913 | Philadelphia Athletics (4, 3–1) | Connie Mack | 4–1 | New York Giants (4, 1–3) | John McGraw |
| 1914 | Boston Braves (1, 1–0) | George Stallings | 4–0 | Philadelphia Athletics (5, 3–2) | Connie Mack |
| 1915 | Boston Red Sox (3, 3–0) | Bill Carrigan | 4–1 | Philadelphia Phillies (1, 0–1) | Pat Moran |
| 1916 | Boston Red Sox (4, 4–0) | Bill Carrigan | 4–1 | Brooklyn Robins (1, 0–1) | Wilbert Robinson |
| 1917 | Chicago White Sox (2, 2–0) | Pants Rowland | 4–2 | New York Giants (5, 1–4) | John McGraw |
| 1918 | Boston Red Sox (5, 5–0) | Ed Barrow | 4–2 | Chicago Cubs (5, 2–3) | Fred Mitchell |
| 1919 | Cincinnati Reds (1, 1–0) | Pat Moran | 5–3^{[V]} | Chicago White Sox (3, 2–1) | Kid Gleason |
| 1920 | Cleveland Indians (1, 1–0) | Tris Speaker | 5–2^{[V]} | Brooklyn Robins (2, 0–2) | Wilbert Robinson |
| 1921 | New York Giants (6, 2–4) | John McGraw | 5–3^{[V]} | New York Yankees (1, 0–1) | Miller Huggins |
| 1922 | New York Giants (7, 3–4) | John McGraw | 4–0–1^{[T]} | New York Yankees (2, 0–2) | Miller Huggins |
| 1923 | New York Yankees (3, 1–2) | Miller Huggins | 4–2 | New York Giants (8, 3–5) | John McGraw |
| 1924 | Washington Senators (1, 1–0) | Bucky Harris | 4–3 | New York Giants (9, 3–6) | John McGraw |
| 1925 | Pittsburgh Pirates (3, 2–1) | Bill McKechnie | 4–3 | Washington Senators (2, 1–1) | Bucky Harris |
| 1926 | St. Louis Cardinals (1, 1–0) | Rogers Hornsby | 4–3 | New York Yankees (4, 1–3) | Miller Huggins |
| 1927 | New York Yankees (5, 2–3) | Miller Huggins | 4–0 | Pittsburgh Pirates (4, 2–2) | Donie Bush |
| 1928 | New York Yankees (6, 3–3) | Miller Huggins | 4–0 | St. Louis Cardinals (2, 1–1) | Bill McKechnie |
| 1929 | Philadelphia Athletics (6, 4–2) | Connie Mack | 4–1 | Chicago Cubs (6, 2–4) | Joe McCarthy |
| 1930 | Philadelphia Athletics (7, 5–2) | Connie Mack | 4–2 | St. Louis Cardinals (3, 1–2) | Gabby Street |
| 1931 | St. Louis Cardinals (4, 2–2) | Gabby Street | 4–3 | Philadelphia Athletics (8, 5–3) | Connie Mack |
| 1932 | New York Yankees (7, 4–3) | Joe McCarthy | 4–0 | Chicago Cubs (7, 2–5) | Charlie Grimm |
| 1933 | New York Giants (10, 4–6) | Bill Terry | 4–1 | Washington Senators (3, 1–2) | Joe Cronin |
| 1934 | St. Louis Cardinals (5, 3–2) | Frank Frisch | 4–3 | Detroit Tigers (4, 0–4) | Mickey Cochrane |
| 1935 | Detroit Tigers (5, 1–4) | Mickey Cochrane | 4–2 | Chicago Cubs (8, 2–6) | Charlie Grimm |
| 1936 | New York Yankees (8, 5–3) | Joe McCarthy | 4–2 | New York Giants (11, 4–7) | Bill Terry |
| 1937 | New York Yankees (9, 6–3) | Joe McCarthy | 4–1 | New York Giants (12, 4–8) | Bill Terry |
| 1938 | New York Yankees (10, 7–3) | Joe McCarthy | 4–0 | Chicago Cubs (9, 2–7) | Gabby Hartnett |
| 1939 | New York Yankees (11, 8–3) | Joe McCarthy | 4–0 | Cincinnati Reds (2, 1–1) | Bill McKechnie |
| 1940 | Cincinnati Reds (3, 2–1) | Bill McKechnie | 4–3 | Detroit Tigers (6, 1–5) | Del Baker |
| 1941 | New York Yankees (12, 9–3) | Joe McCarthy | 4–1 | Brooklyn Dodgers (3, 0–3) | Leo Durocher |
| 1942 | St. Louis Cardinals (6, 4–2) | Billy Southworth | 4–1 | New York Yankees (13, 9–4) | Joe McCarthy |
| 1943 | New York Yankees (14, 10–4) | Joe McCarthy | 4–1 | St. Louis Cardinals (7, 4–3) | Billy Southworth |
| 1944 | St. Louis Cardinals (8, 5–3) | Billy Southworth | 4–2 | St. Louis Browns (1, 0–1) | Luke Sewell |
| 1945 | Detroit Tigers (7, 2–5) | Steve O'Neill | 4–3 | Chicago Cubs (10, 2–8) | Charlie Grimm |
| 1946 | St. Louis Cardinals (9, 6–3) | Eddie Dyer | 4–3 | Boston Red Sox (6, 5–1) | Joe Cronin |
| 1947 | New York Yankees (15, 11–4) | Bucky Harris | 4–3 | Brooklyn Dodgers (4, 0–4) | Burt Shotton |
| 1948 | Cleveland Indians (2, 2–0) | Lou Boudreau | 4–2 | Boston Braves (2, 1–1) | Billy Southworth |
| 1949 | New York Yankees (16, 12–4) | Casey Stengel | 4–1 | Brooklyn Dodgers (5, 0–5) | Burt Shotton |
| 1950 | New York Yankees (17, 13–4) | Casey Stengel | 4–0 | Philadelphia Phillies (2, 0–2) | Eddie Sawyer |
| 1951 | New York Yankees (18, 14–4) | Casey Stengel | 4–2 | New York Giants (13, 4–9) | Leo Durocher |
| 1952 | New York Yankees (19, 15–4) | Casey Stengel | 4–3 | Brooklyn Dodgers (6, 0–6) | Charlie Dressen |
| 1953 | New York Yankees (20, 16–4) | Casey Stengel | 4–2 | Brooklyn Dodgers (7, 0–7) | Charlie Dressen |
| 1954 | New York Giants (14, 5–9) | Leo Durocher | 4–0 | Cleveland Indians (3, 2–1) | Al Lopez |
| 1955 | Brooklyn Dodgers (8, 1–7) | Walter Alston | 4–3 | New York Yankees (21, 16–5) | Casey Stengel |
| 1956 | New York Yankees (22, 17–5) | Casey Stengel | 4–3 | Brooklyn Dodgers (9, 1–8) | Walter Alston |
| 1957 | Milwaukee Braves (3, 2–1) | Fred Haney | 4–3 | New York Yankees (23, 17–6) | Casey Stengel |
| 1958 | New York Yankees (24, 18–6) | Casey Stengel | 4–3 | Milwaukee Braves (4, 2–2) | Fred Haney |
| 1959 | Los Angeles Dodgers (10, 2–8) | Walter Alston | 4–2 | Chicago White Sox (4, 2–2) | Al Lopez |
| 1960 | Pittsburgh Pirates (5, 3–2) | Danny Murtaugh | 4–3 | New York Yankees (25, 18–7) | Casey Stengel |
| 1961 | New York Yankees (26, 19–7) | Ralph Houk | 4–1 | Cincinnati Reds (4, 2–2) | Fred Hutchinson |
| 1962 | New York Yankees (27, 20–7) | Ralph Houk | 4–3 | San Francisco Giants (15, 5–10) | Alvin Dark |
| 1963 | Los Angeles Dodgers (11, 3–8) | Walter Alston | 4–0 | New York Yankees (28, 20–8) | Ralph Houk |
| 1964 | St. Louis Cardinals (10, 7–3) | Johnny Keane | 4–3 | New York Yankees (29, 20–9) | Yogi Berra |
| 1965 | Los Angeles Dodgers (12, 4–8) | Walter Alston | 4–3 | Minnesota Twins (4, 1–3) | Sam Mele |
| 1966 | Baltimore Orioles (2, 1–1) | Hank Bauer | 4–0 | Los Angeles Dodgers (13, 4–9) | Walter Alston |
| 1967 (Note: The 1967 series marked the first time that the Commissioner's Trophy was presented to the World Series-winning team.) | St. Louis Cardinals (11, 8–3) | Red Schoendienst | 4–3 | Boston Red Sox (7, 5–2) | Dick Williams |
| 1968 | Detroit Tigers (8, 3–5) | Mayo Smith | 4–3 | St. Louis Cardinals (12, 8–4) | Red Schoendienst |
| 1969 | New York Mets (1, 1–0) | Gil Hodges | 4–1 | Baltimore Orioles (3, 1–2) | Earl Weaver |
| 1970 | Baltimore Orioles (4, 2–2) | Earl Weaver | 4–1 | Cincinnati Reds (5, 2–3) | Sparky Anderson |
| 1971 | Pittsburgh Pirates (6, 4–2) | Danny Murtaugh | 4–3 | Baltimore Orioles (5, 2–3) | Earl Weaver |
| 1972 | Oakland Athletics (9, 6–3) | Dick Williams | 4–3 | Cincinnati Reds (6, 2–4) | Sparky Anderson |
| 1973 | Oakland Athletics (10, 7–3) | Dick Williams | 4–3 | New York Mets (2, 1–1) | Yogi Berra |
| 1974 | Oakland Athletics (11, 8–3) | Alvin Dark | 4–1 | Los Angeles Dodgers (14, 4–10) | Walter Alston |
| 1975 | Cincinnati Reds (7, 3–4) | Sparky Anderson | 4–3 | Boston Red Sox (8, 5–3) | Darrell Johnson |
| 1976 | Cincinnati Reds (8, 4–4) | Sparky Anderson | 4–0 | New York Yankees (30, 20–10) | Billy Martin |
| 1977 | New York Yankees (31, 21–10) | Billy Martin | 4–2 | Los Angeles Dodgers (15, 4–11) | Tommy Lasorda |
| 1978 | New York Yankees (32, 22–10) | Bob Lemon | 4–2 | Los Angeles Dodgers (16, 4–12) | Tommy Lasorda |
| 1979 | Pittsburgh Pirates (7, 5–2) | Chuck Tanner | 4–3 | Baltimore Orioles (6, 2–4) | Earl Weaver |
| 1980 | Philadelphia Phillies (3, 1–2) | Dallas Green | 4–2 | Kansas City Royals (1, 0–1) | Jim Frey |
| 1981 | Los Angeles Dodgers (17, 5–12) | Tommy Lasorda | 4–2 | New York Yankees (33, 22–11) | Bob Lemon |
| 1982 | St. Louis Cardinals (13, 9–4) | Whitey Herzog | 4–3 | Milwaukee Brewers^{[A]} (1, 0–1) | Harvey Kuenn |
| 1983 | Baltimore Orioles (7, 3–4) | Joe Altobelli | 4–1 | Philadelphia Phillies (4, 1–3) | Paul Owens |
| 1984 | Detroit Tigers (9, 4–5) | Sparky Anderson | 4–1 | San Diego Padres (1, 0–1) | Dick Williams |
| 1985 | Kansas City Royals (2, 1–1) | Dick Howser | 4–3 | St. Louis Cardinals (14, 9–5) | Whitey Herzog |
| 1986 | New York Mets (3, 2–1) | Davey Johnson | 4–3 | Boston Red Sox (9, 5–4) | John McNamara |
| 1987 | Minnesota Twins (5, 2–3) | Tom Kelly | 4–3 | St. Louis Cardinals (15, 9–6) | Whitey Herzog |
| 1988 | Los Angeles Dodgers (18, 6–12) | Tommy Lasorda | 4–1 | Oakland Athletics (12, 8–4) | Tony La Russa |
| 1989 | Oakland Athletics (13, 9–4) | Tony La Russa | 4–0 | San Francisco Giants (16, 5–11) | Roger Craig |
| 1990 | Cincinnati Reds (9, 5–4) | Lou Piniella | 4–0 | Oakland Athletics (14, 9–5) | Tony La Russa |
| 1991 | Minnesota Twins (6, 3–3) | Tom Kelly | 4–3 | Atlanta Braves (5, 2–3) | Bobby Cox |
| 1992 | Toronto Blue Jays (1, 1–0) | Cito Gaston | 4–2 | Atlanta Braves (6, 2–4) | Bobby Cox |
| 1993 | Toronto Blue Jays (2, 2–0) | Cito Gaston | 4–2 | Philadelphia Phillies (5, 1–4) | Jim Fregosi |
| 1994 | Cancelled due to a players' strike. | | | | |
| 1995 | Atlanta Braves (7, 3–4) | Bobby Cox | 4–2 | Cleveland Indians (4, 2–2) | Mike Hargrove |
| 1996 | New York Yankees (34, 23–11) | Joe Torre | 4–2 | Atlanta Braves (8, 3–5) | Bobby Cox |
| 1997 | Florida Marlins^{[W]} (1, 1–0) | Jim Leyland | 4–3 | Cleveland Indians (5, 2–3) | Mike Hargrove |
| 1998 | New York Yankees (35, 24–11) | Joe Torre | 4–0 | San Diego Padres (2, 0–2) | Bruce Bochy |
| 1999 | New York Yankees (36, 25–11) | Joe Torre | 4–0 | Atlanta Braves (9, 3–6) | Bobby Cox |
| 2000 | New York Yankees (37, 26–11) | Joe Torre | 4–1 | New York Mets^{[W]} (4, 2–2) | Bobby Valentine |
| 2001 | Arizona Diamondbacks (1, 1–0) | Bob Brenly | 4–3 | New York Yankees (38, 26–12) | Joe Torre |
| 2002 | Anaheim Angels^{[W]} (1, 1–0) | Mike Scioscia | 4–3 | San Francisco Giants^{[W]} (17, 5–12) | Dusty Baker |
| 2003 | Florida Marlins^{[W]} (2, 2–0) | Jack McKeon | 4–2 | New York Yankees (39, 26–13) | Joe Torre |
| 2004 | Boston Red Sox^{[W]} (10, 6–4) | Terry Francona | 4–0 | St. Louis Cardinals (16, 9–7) | Tony La Russa |
| 2005 | Chicago White Sox (5, 3–2) | Ozzie Guillén | 4–0 | Houston Astros^{[W]}^{[N]} (1, 0–1) | Phil Garner |
| 2006 | St. Louis Cardinals (17, 10–7) | Tony La Russa | 4–1 | Detroit Tigers^{[W]} (10, 4–6) | Jim Leyland |
| 2007 | Boston Red Sox (11, 7–4) | Terry Francona | 4–0 | Colorado Rockies^{[W]} (1, 0–1) | Clint Hurdle |
| 2008 | Philadelphia Phillies (6, 2–4) | Charlie Manuel | 4–1 | Tampa Bay Rays (1, 0–1) | Joe Maddon |
| 2009 | New York Yankees (40, 27–13) | Joe Girardi | 4–2 | Philadelphia Phillies (7, 2–5) | Charlie Manuel |
| 2010 | San Francisco Giants (18, 6–12) | Bruce Bochy | 4–1 | Texas Rangers (1, 0–1) | Ron Washington |
| 2011 | St. Louis Cardinals^{[W]} (18, 11–7) | Tony La Russa | 4–3 | Texas Rangers (2, 0–2) | Ron Washington |
| 2012 | San Francisco Giants (19, 7–12) | Bruce Bochy | 4–0 | Detroit Tigers (11, 4–7) | Jim Leyland |
| 2013 | Boston Red Sox (12, 8–4) | John Farrell | 4–2 | St. Louis Cardinals (19, 11–8) | Mike Matheny |
| 2014 | San Francisco Giants^{[W]} (20, 8–12) | Bruce Bochy | 4–3 | Kansas City Royals^{[W]} (3, 1–2) | Ned Yost |
| 2015 | Kansas City Royals (4, 2–2) | Ned Yost | 4–1 | New York Mets (5, 2–3) | Terry Collins |
| 2016 | Chicago Cubs (11, 3–8) | Joe Maddon | 4–3 | Cleveland Indians (6, 2–4) | Terry Francona |
| 2017 | Houston Astros (2, 1–1) | A.J. Hinch | 4–3 | Los Angeles Dodgers (19, 6–13) | Dave Roberts |
| 2018 | Boston Red Sox (13, 9–4) | Alex Cora | 4–1 | Los Angeles Dodgers (20, 6–14) | Dave Roberts |
| 2019 | Washington Nationals^{[W]} (1, 1–0) | Dave Martinez | 4–3 | Houston Astros (3, 1–2) | A. J. Hinch |
| 2020 | Los Angeles Dodgers (21, 7–14) | Dave Roberts | 4–2 | Tampa Bay Rays (2, 0–2) | Kevin Cash |
| 2021 | Atlanta Braves (10, 4–6) | Brian Snitker | 4–2 | Houston Astros (4, 1–3) | Dusty Baker |
| 2022 | Houston Astros (5, 2–3) | Dusty Baker | 4–2 | Philadelphia Phillies^{[W]} (8, 2–6) | Rob Thomson |
| 2023 | Texas Rangers^{[W]} (3, 1–2) | Bruce Bochy | 4–1 | Arizona Diamondbacks^{[W]} (2, 1–1) | Torey Lovullo |
| 2024 | Los Angeles Dodgers (22, 8–14) | Dave Roberts | 4–1 | New York Yankees (41, 27–14) | Aaron Boone |
| 2025 | Los Angeles Dodgers (23, 9–14) | Dave Roberts | 4–3 | Toronto Blue Jays (3, 2–1) | John Schneider |
| 2026 | Milwaukee Brewers (2, 1–1) | Pat Murphy | 4–1 | Tampa Bay Rays (3, 0–3) | Kevin Cash |

Legend

- ^{V} The 1903, 1919, 1920, and 1921 World Series were in a best-of-nine format (carried by the first team to win five games).
- ^{T} The 1907, 1912, and 1922 World Series each included one tied game.
- ^{A} The Brewers were in the American League from 1969 to 1997, after which they moved to the National League.
- ^{N} The Astros were in the National League from 1962 to 2012, after which they moved to the American League.
- ^{W} Indicates a team that made the playoffs as a wild card team (rather than by winning a division).

Source for this Table

== Records by franchise ==
In the sortable table below, teams are ordered first by number of wins, then by number of appearances, and finally by year of first appearance. In the "Season(s)" column, bold years indicate winning appearances.

| Team | Wins | Losses | Apps | Win % | Season(s) |
|---|---|---|---|---|---|
| New York Highlanders / Yankees | 27 | 14 | 41 | .659 | 1921, 1922, 1923, 1926, 1927, 1928, 1932, 1936, 1937, 1938, 1939, 1941, 1942, 1943, 1947, 1949, 1950, 1951, 1952, 1953, 1955, 1956, 1957, 1958, 1960, 1961, 1962, 1963, 1964, 1976, 1977, 1978, 1981, 1996, 1998, 1999, 2000, 2001, 2003, 2009, 2024 |
| St. Louis Cardinals | 11 | 8 | 19 | .579 | 1926, 1928, 1930, 1931, 1934, 1942, 1943, 1944, 1946, 1964, 1967, 1968, 1982, 1985, 1987, 2004, 2006, 2011, 2013 |
| Brooklyn / Los Angeles Dodgers | 9 | 14 | 23 | .391 | 1916, 1920, 1941, 1947, 1949, 1952, 1953, 1955, 1956, 1959, 1963, 1965, 1966, 1974, 1977, 1978, 1981, 1988, 2017, 2018, 2020, 2024, 2025 |
| Philadelphia / Kansas City / Oakland / Athletics | 9 | 5 | 14 | .643 | 1905, 1910, 1911, 1913, 1914, 1929, 1930, 1931, 1972, 1973, 1974, 1988, 1989, 1990 |
| Boston Americans / Red Sox | 9 | 4 | 13 | .692 | 1903, 1912, 1915, 1916, 1918, 1946, 1967, 1975, 1986, 2004, 2007, 2013, 2018 |
| New York / San Francisco Giants | 8 | 12 | 20 | .400 | 1905, 1911, 1912, 1913, 1917, 1921, 1922, 1923, 1924, 1933, 1936, 1937, 1951, 1954, 1962, 1989, 2002, 2010, 2012, 2014 |
| Cincinnati Reds | 5 | 4 | 9 | .556 | 1919, 1939, 1940, 1961, 1970, 1972, 1975, 1976, 1990 |
| Pittsburgh Pirates | 5 | 2 | 7 | .714 | 1903, 1909, 1925, 1927, 1960, 1971, 1979 |
| Detroit Tigers | 4 | 7 | 11 | .364 | 1907, 1908, 1909, 1934, 1935, 1940, 1945, 1968, 1984, 2006, 2012 |
| Boston / Milwaukee / Atlanta Braves | 4 | 6 | 10 | .400 | 1914, 1948, 1957, 1958, 1991, 1992, 1995, 1996, 1999, 2021 |
| Chicago Cubs | 3 | 8 | 11 | .273 | 1906, 1907, 1908, 1910, 1918, 1929, 1932, 1935, 1938, 1945, 2016 |
| Milwaukee Brewers / St. Louis Browns / Baltimore Orioles | 3 | 4 | 7 | .429 | 1944, 1966, 1969, 1970, 1971, 1979, 1983 |
| Washington Senators / Minnesota Twins | 3 | 3 | 6 | .500 | 1924, 1925, 1933, 1965, 1987, 1991 |
| Chicago White Sox | 3 | 2 | 5 | .600 | 1906, 1917, 1919, 1959, 2005 |
| Philadelphia Phillies | 2 | 6 | 8 | .250 | 1915, 1950, 1980, 1983, 1993, 2008, 2009, 2022 |
| Cleveland Indians / Guardians | 2 | 4 | 6 | .333 | 1920, 1948, 1954, 1995, 1997, 2016 |
| New York Mets | 2 | 3 | 5 | .400 | 1969, 1973, 1986, 2000, 2015 |
| Houston Colt .45s / Astros | 2 | 3 | 5 | .400 | 2005, 2017, 2019, 2021, 2022 |
| Kansas City Royals | 2 | 2 | 4 | .500 | 1980, 1985, 2014, 2015 |
| Toronto Blue Jays | 2 | 1 | 3 | .667 | 1992, 1993, 2025 |
| Florida / Miami Marlins | 2 | 0 | 2 | 1.000 | 1997, 2003 |
| Washington Senators / Texas Rangers | 1 | 2 | 3 | .333 | 2010, 2011, 2023 |
| Arizona Diamondbacks | 1 | 1 | 2 | .500 | 2001, 2023 |
| Seattle Pilots / Milwaukee Brewers | 1 | 1 | 2 | .500 | 1982, 2026 |
| California / Anaheim / Los Angeles Angels | 1 | 0 | 1 | 1.000 | 2002 |
| Montreal Expos / Washington Nationals | 1 | 0 | 1 | 1.000 | 2019 |
| Tampa Bay Devil Rays / Rays | 0 | 3 | 3 | .000 | 2008, 2020, 2026 |
| San Diego Padres | 0 | 2 | 2 | .000 | 1984, 1998 |
| Colorado Rockies | 0 | 1 | 1 | .000 | 2007 |
| Seattle Mariners | 0 | 0 | 0 | — | |

== Frequent matchups ==
The following are the 20 matchups of teams that have occurred two or more times in the World Series. All teams that have participated in these were "Classic Eight" members of either the American or National League; no expansion team (created in 1961 or later) has faced the same opponent more than once in a World Series.

| Count | Matchup | Record | Years | Notes |
|---|---|---|---|---|
| 12 | New York Yankees vs. Los Angeles Dodgers | Yankees, 8‍–‍4 | 1941, 1947, 1949, 1952, 1953, 1955, 1956, 1963, 1977, 1978, 1981, 2024 | Dodgers were the Brooklyn Dodgers for the 1941–1956 matchups |
| 7 | New York Yankees vs. San Francisco Giants | Yankees, 5‍–‍2 | 1921, 1922, 1923, 1936, 1937, 1951, 1962 | Giants were the New York Giants for the 1921–1951 matchups |
| 5 | St. Louis Cardinals vs. New York Yankees | Cardinals, 3‍–‍2 | 1926, 1928, 1942, 1943, 1964 | |
| 4 | Chicago Cubs vs. Detroit Tigers | Tied, 2‍–‍2 | 1907, 1908, 1935, 1945 | |
| 4 | Athletics vs. San Francisco Giants | Athletics, 3‍–‍1 | 1905, 1911, 1913, 1989 | Athletics were the Philadelphia Athletics for the 1905–1913 matchups, Oakland Athletics for the 1989 matchup; Giants were the New York Giants for the 1905–1913 matchups |
| 4 | New York Yankees vs. Atlanta Braves | Yankees, 3‍–‍1 | 1957, 1958, 1996, 1999 | Braves were the Milwaukee Braves for the 1957–1958 matchups |
| 4 | Boston Red Sox vs. St. Louis Cardinals | Tied, 2‍–‍2 | 1946, 1967, 2004, 2013 | |
| 3 | New York Yankees vs. Cincinnati Reds | Yankees, 2‍–‍1 | 1939, 1961, 1976 | |
| 3 | St. Louis Cardinals vs. Detroit Tigers | Cardinals, 2‍–‍1 | 1934, 1968, 2006 | |
| 2 | Athletics vs. Chicago Cubs | Athletics, 2‍–‍0 | 1910, 1929 | Athletics were the Philadelphia Athletics for the matchups |
| 2 | Athletics vs. St. Louis Cardinals | Tied, 1‍–‍1 | 1930, 1931 | Athletics were the Philadelphia Athletics for the matchups |
| 2 | Minnesota Twins vs. San Francisco Giants | Tied, 1‍–‍1 | 1924, 1933 | Twins were the Washington Senators; Giants were the New York Giants for the matchups |
| 2 | New York Yankees vs. Chicago Cubs | Yankees, 2‍–‍0 | 1932, 1938 | |
| 2 | New York Yankees vs. Pittsburgh Pirates | Tied, 1‍–‍1 | 1927, 1960 | |
| 2 | Pittsburgh Pirates vs. Baltimore Orioles | Pirates, 2‍–‍0 | 1971, 1979 | |
| 2 | Los Angeles Dodgers vs. Athletics | Tied, 1‍–‍1 | 1974, 1988 | Athletics were the Oakland Athletics for the matchups |
| 2 | Cincinnati Reds vs. Athletics | Tied, 1‍–‍1 | 1972, 1990 | Athletics were the Oakland Athletics for the matchups |
| 2 | Atlanta Braves vs. Cleveland Guardians | Tied, 1‍–‍1 | 1948, 1995 | Braves were the Boston Braves for the 1948 matchup; Guardians were the Cleveland Indians for the matchups |
| 2 | New York Yankees vs. Philadelphia Phillies | Yankees, 2‍–‍0 | 1950, 2009 | |
| 2 | Boston Red Sox vs. Los Angeles Dodgers | Red Sox, 2‍–‍0 | 1916, 2018 | Dodgers were the Brooklyn Dodgers for the 1916 matchup |

== See also ==
- World Series Most Valuable Player Award
- List of World Series sweeps
- List of American League pennant winners
- List of National League pennant winners
- List of Major League Baseball franchise postseason droughts
- List of Major League Baseball franchise postseason streaks
- List of pre-World Series baseball champions
