= John Taff =

American baseball player (1890-1961)

- Pitcher
- Born: June 3, 1890; Austin, Texas, U.S.
- Died: May 15, 1961 (aged 70); Houston, Texas, U.S.
- Batted: Right Threw: Right

MLB debut
- May 11, 1913, for the Philadelphia Athletics

Last MLB appearance
- June 28, 1913, for the Philadelphia Athletics

MLB statistics
- Win–loss record: 0-1
- Earned run average: 6.62
- Strikeouts: 9
- Stats at Baseball Reference

Teams
- Philadelphia Athletics (1913)

John Gallatin Taff (June 3, 1890 – May 15, 1961) was an American Major League Baseball pitcher who played in 1913 with the Philadelphia Athletics. He batted and threw right-handed. Taff had a 0-1 record with a 6.62 ERA in seven games during his one-year career. He was born in Austin, Texas and died in Houston, Texas.
