= Monte Pfeffer =

American baseball player (1891-1941)

- Shortstop
- Born: October 8, 1891; New York City, U.S.
- Died: September 27, 1941 (aged 49); New York City, U.S.
- Batted: Right Threw: Right

MLB debut
- September 29, 1913, for the Philadelphia Athletics

Last MLB appearance
- September 29, 1913, for the Philadelphia Athletics

MLB statistics
- Games played: 1
- Hits: 0
- Runs batted in: 0
- Stats at Baseball Reference

Teams
- Philadelphia Athletics (1913)

Monte Pfeffer (October 8, 1891 – September 27, 1941) born Montague Pfeiffer, was an American Major League Baseball infielder. He played one game for the Philadelphia Athletics during the 1913 season. Pfeffer was Jewish.

== External Sources ==
- Monte Pfeffer at SABR Bio Project
