= Press Cruthers =

American baseball player (1890–1976)

- Second base
- Born: September 8, 1890; Marshallton, Delaware, U.S.
- Died: December 27, 1976 (aged 86); Kenosha, Wisconsin, U.S.
- Batted: Right Threw: Right

MLB debut
- September 29, 1913, for the Philadelphia Athletics

Last MLB appearance
- October 3, 1914, for the Philadelphia Athletics

MLB statistics
- Batting average: .222
- Hits: 6
- Runs batted in: 0
- Stats at Baseball Reference

Teams
- Philadelphia Athletics (1913–1914)

Charles Preston Cruthers (September 8, 1890 – December 27, 1976) was an American second baseman in Major League Baseball who played from 1913 through 1914 for the Philadelphia Athletics. Listed at 5 ft 9 in (1.75 m), 152 lb, Cruthers batted and threw right-handed. He was born in Marshallton, Delaware.

Cruthers played briefly for the Athletics in part of two seasons. He was a member of two American League champion teams, including the 1913 World Champion, though he did not play in the Series. As a backup for regular Eddie Collins, he posted a .222 batting average in seven games (6-for-27), including one double and one triple while scoring a run.

In six Minor league seasons (1913–1918), Cruthers was a .268 hitter with six home runs in 648 games. He also managed the Kenosha Comets of the All-American Girls Professional Baseball League during the 1946 season.

Cruthers is part of the AAGPBL permanent display at the Baseball Hall of Fame and Museum at Cooperstown, New York, opened in 1988, which is dedicated to the entire league rather than any individual figure.

Cruthers was a longtime resident of Kenosha, Wisconsin, where he died at the age of 86.
