= Eddie Plank =

American baseball player (1875-1926)

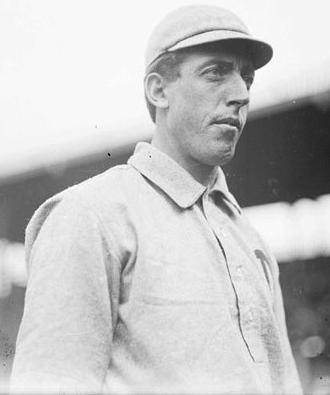
- Plank in 1905
- Pitcher
- Born: August 31, 1875; Gettysburg, Pennsylvania, U.S.
- Died: February 24, 1926 (aged 50); Gettysburg, Pennsylvania, U.S.
- Batted: Left Threw: Left

MLB debut
- May 13, 1901, for the Philadelphia Athletics

Last MLB appearance
- August 6, 1917, for the St. Louis Browns

MLB statistics
- Win–loss record: 326–194
- Earned run average: 2.35
- Strikeouts: 2,246
- Stats at Baseball Reference

Teams
- Philadelphia Athletics (1901–1914); St. Louis Terriers (1915); St. Louis Browns (1916–1917)

Career highlights and awards
- 3× World Series champion (1910, 1911, 1913); Philadelphia Baseball Wall of Fame; Athletics Hall of Fame

Member of the National

Baseball Hall of Fame
- Induction: 1946
- Election method: Old-Timers Committee

Edward Stewart Plank (August 31, 1875 – February 24, 1926), nicknamed "Gettysburg Eddie", was an American professional baseball player. A pitcher, Plank played in the major leagues for the Philadelphia Athletics from 1901 through 1914, the St. Louis Terriers in 1915, and the St. Louis Browns in 1916 and 1917.

Plank was the first left-handed pitcher to win 200 games and then 300 games, and now ranks third in all-time wins among left-handers with 326 career victories (13th all time) and first all-time in career shutouts by a left-handed pitcher with 66. Philadelphia went to the World Series five times while Plank played there, but he sat out the 1910 World Series due to an injury. Plank had only a 1.32 earned run average (ERA) in his World Series career, but he was unlucky, with a 2-5 win–loss record in those games.

Plank died of a stroke in 1926. He was posthumously elected to the Baseball Hall of Fame in 1946 by the Veterans Committee.

== Early life ==
Plank grew up on a farm near Gettysburg, Pennsylvania. He was the fourth of seven children born to Martha McCreary and David Plank. His father was a school director and tax collector in Gettysburg. Plank did not play baseball until the age of 17, when he started playing for local teams in the Gettysburg area. He practiced pitching by throwing a baseball against his barn door, drawing lectures from his father for all the dents he left. When Plank was about 22, Frank Foreman, the pitching coach at Gettysburg College, asked him to try out for the school's baseball team. History books often erroneously state that Plank graduated from Gettysburg College. He attended Gettysburg Academy, a prep school affiliated with the college. However, he played for the college's team without ever being enrolled there.

== Career ==
In 1900, Plank signed with the Richmond Colts of the Virginia League, a minor league. The league folded before Plank could pitch for the Colts. However, next May, Foreman recommended Plank to Connie Mack, the manager of the Philadelphia Athletics, who liked what he saw and signed Plank to a contract.

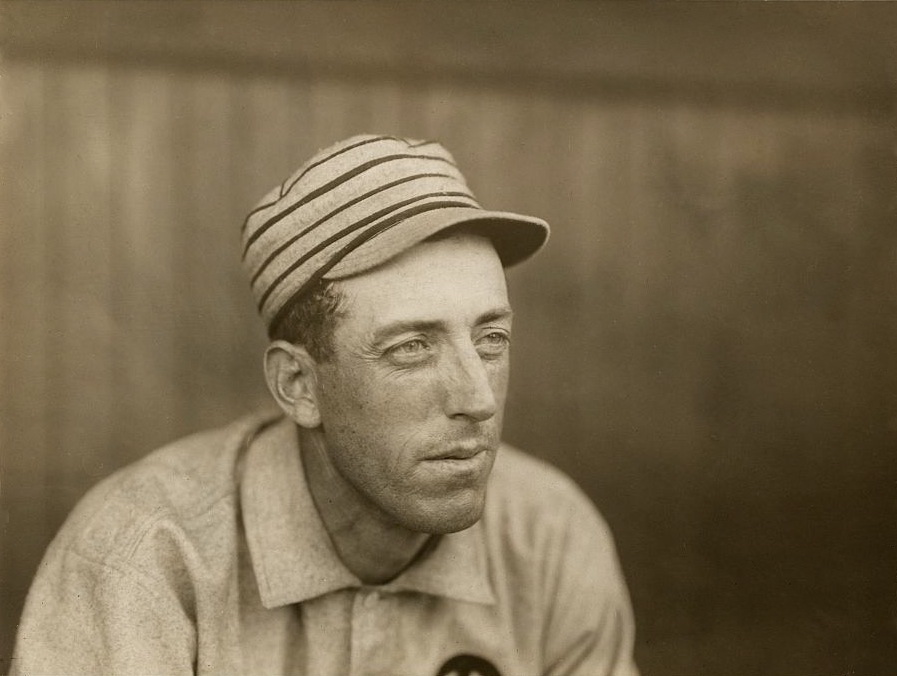
Plank, circa 1911

Plank made his major league debut for the Athletics on May 13, 1901. As a rookie, Plank pitched well, posting a 17–13 win–loss record with a 3.31 earned run average (ERA) and 28 complete games in 32 games started. He won 20 games for the first time in his career in 1902, posting a 20–15 record and a 3.30 ERA as the Athletics won the American League (AL) pennant. Only Rube Waddell won more games that year for the Athletics, as Mack pointed out. He won 23 games in 1903 while leading the AL in games started. In 1905, Plank made his first trip to the World Series. He faced Christy Mathewson in the first game and Joe McGinnity in the fourth game. Though Plank gave up only three runs in 17 innings during the series, the Athletics lost to the New York Giants in five games and did not score an earned run in the entire series. The Athletics returned to the World Series in 1910, but Plank was forced to sit out with a sore arm, although newspapers were speculating that he would pitch during the series.

By 1911, Plank was the last member of the Athletics remaining from the 1901 team. The 1911 team made the World Series and faced the Giants again. After Plank won Game Two and lost in a relief appearance in Game Five, the Athletics won the series in six games. In 1913, the Athletics and Giants met again in the World Series, and Plank faced Mathewson in Games Two and Five. Mathewson hit a tenth-inning single off of Plank to set up a Giants victory in Game Two, but Plank and the Athletics bested Mathewson 3–1 in the fifth and deciding game of the series. In 1914, Plank's final year with Philadelphia, he went to the World Series again. Plank pitched a complete game in Game Two, but he lost 1–0 and the Boston Braves won the series in four games.

During his tenure in Philadelphia, Plank was one of the most consistent pitchers in the game, winning over 20 games seven times. In the four World Series in which he played, Plank earned a 1.32 ERA but only a 2–5 win–loss record. As Plank was one of the best pitchers on the Athletics, Mack would usually match him up against Christy Mathewson, another Hall of Famer, when the Athletics played the Giants in the World Series. Plank pitched complete games in all six of his World Series starts. His quiet personality led to him getting overshadowed in media coverage by other Athletics pitchers such as Hall of Famers Waddell and Chief Bender, but Plank would win more games than either of these.

In November 1914, it was rumored that Plank would be sold to the New York Highlanders. In December, Plank signed a contract to play in the Federal League. Mack expressed no regret at Plank's departure, saying, "I wish him the best of luck... I was through with him. He was after the money. He was a wonderful pitcher and he is a good one yet." He played for the outlaw league's St. Louis Terriers and won 21 games, the eighth and final time he reached the 20-win plateau.

When the Federal League folded, Plank applied for free agency but was declared to belong to the St. Louis Browns for 1916. In September of that year, Plank predicted that he might be able to pitch ten more seasons, saying, "I don't know whether it is that I have more on the ball this season than I had in other years, but at any rate I feel that I have just as much stuff as I ever did." However, by June 1917 newspapers reported that Plank's career was nearly over; he had struggled with arm problems and had left the team at one point due to a nervous breakdown. He retired in October 1917, citing stomach difficulties brought on by the stress of baseball. His final game was a 1–0 11-inning complete game loss to Walter Johnson and the Washington Senators on August 6, 1917. Despite his announcement, the New York Yankees traded pitchers Urban Shocker and Nick Cullop, infielders Fritz Maisel and Joe Gedeon, catcher Les Nunamaker, and cash to the Browns for Plank and Del Pratt. Plank refused to report to New York, insisting he was retired.

Over his career, Plank amassed a 326–194 record, a 2.35 ERA, and 2,246 strikeouts. He won 305 games in the American League (AL), making him that league's winningest left-handed pitcher. He was the winningest left-hander in baseball history until 1962, when Warren Spahn won his 327th game. In addition, he was the winningest pitcher (left or right-handed) in the AL until 1921, when he was surpassed by Walter Johnson.

Plank was known as a finesse pitcher with a good sidearm sweeping curveball. His best-known pitch was nicknamed the "cross-fire." Thrown across his body, it reached home plate at an angle, making it difficult for hitters to track, especially if they were left-handed. Plank was active on the mound before he threw a pitch, even sometimes talking to the baseball before he delivered it. This strange behavior helped to unnerve opposing hitters. His consistent performance and strong work ethic led Mack to use him frequently, part of the reason Plank at times developed sore arms during his career. Plank was also known for his long pauses on the mound, which some claimed lengthened the duration of the games in which he pitched.

Plank was also a good hitting pitcher in his career, compiling a .206 batting average (331-for-1607) with 130 runs scored, 3 home runs, and 122 RBI. He recorded a career .971 fielding percentage, which was 28 points over the league average for AL pitchers from 1901 to 1917.

== Personal life ==
Plank married Anna (née Myers) in 1915. They had a son, named Edward Stewart Plank Jr. According to baseball historian Frank Russo, he was "as solid a family man as you could ever find." Plank's brother Ira was the baseball coach at Gettysburg College for more than 20 years. Friendly by nature, Plank did the unusual by taking time to mentor the rookie pitchers on the Athletics' staff, and he befriended Louis Van Zelst, a hunchback who served as the team's mascot.

== Later life ==
After retirement, Plank opened a Buick dealership in Gettysburg. He pitched the 1918 season for the Steelton club of the Bethlehem Steel League, an industrial baseball league. Steelton was only 40 miles (64 km) from his home and the arrangement allowed him to manage his business during the week.

Plank did not seem to be in ill health after his career, but on February 22, 1926, his wife awoke to discover her husband paralyzed on the left side due to a stroke and suffering garbled speech. Upon arriving at the Plank home, the family physician and Plank's wife decided he should be left where he was for treatment, rather than moved to a hospital. The pitcher showed signs of recovery briefly, then started having bouts of lost consciousness. He lost the ability to speak, and by the 24th, no one expected him to recover. He died at 2:49 P.M. that day.

Two days after his death, Plank's funeral was held at Gettysburg's First Presbyterian Church. The Rev. W. C. Space said, "Eddie...was true to his manhood, true to his parents, true to his wife and home, true to his God and church. What better could be spoken of any man?" He was buried in Evergreen Cemetery in Gettysburg. Anna lived 29 more years before her death in 1955.

Upon hearing of Plank's death, Connie Mack said that he felt like a father who had just lost a son. "Eddie Plank was one of the smartest left-hand pitchers it has been my pleasure to have on my club. He was short and light, as pitchers go, but he made up for the physical defects, if such they were, by his study of the game and his smartness when he was on the pitching peak", he said. Former teammate Jack Coombs said, "I have always been thankful that I was thrown into such intimate contact with so inspiring a man in the days when the majority of ballplayers were of a much lower type than at the present time."

Plank was a Freemason and a member of Good Samaritan Lodge No. 336 in Gettysburg.

== Legacy ==
Eddie Plank
- Interactive map of Eddie Plank
- 39.83635°N 77.23134°W
- Location: Intersection of Carlisle St. & West Lincoln Ave., Gettysburg

Line-Up for Yesterday

P is for Plank,
The arm of the A's;
When he tangled with Matty
Games lasted for days.

— Ogden Nash, Sport magazine (January 1949)

In 1943, former teammate Eddie Collins remembered Plank as the greatest pitcher in baseball. "Not the fastest. Not the trickiest, and not the possessor of the most stuff, but just the greatest", Collins said. Babe Ruth thought he was the hardest pitcher to hit, and Ty Cobb selected him to his all-time team. He was inducted into the Baseball Hall of Fame in 1946 and voted into the Pennsylvania Sports Hall of Fame in 1972.

Gettysburg College began planning for the Eddie Plank Memorial Gymnasium at the college shortly after Plank's death. The gym was completed in 1927 and indoor sports such as basketball and wrestling were played there until 1962. A restaurant in downtown Gettysburg honors Plank's career. A portion of Plank's childhood farm is a housing development known as Plank's Field. Plank is mentioned in the 1949 poem "Line-Up for Yesterday" by Ogden Nash.

In 2006, a T206 tobacco card featuring Plank was described as the "second most valuable card in existence." It was owned by Arizona Diamondbacks owner Ken Kendrick and was part of a collection that Kendrick loaned to the Baseball Hall of Fame for display there. The most valuable baseball card in existence, a T206 Honus Wagner card, is in the same collection.

The first full-length biography of Eddie Plank, Gettysburg Eddie: The Story of Eddie Plank by Lawrence Knorr, was published in 2018 by Sunbury Press.

== See also ==
- List of Major League Baseball career wins leaders
- List of Major League Baseball annual saves leaders
- List of Major League Baseball career hit batsmen leaders
- List of Major League Baseball career strikeout leaders
- List of Major League Baseball career FIP leaders
- List of Major League Baseball career ERA leaders
- List of baseball players who went directly to Major League Baseball
