= 1913 World Series =

1913 Major League Baseball championship series

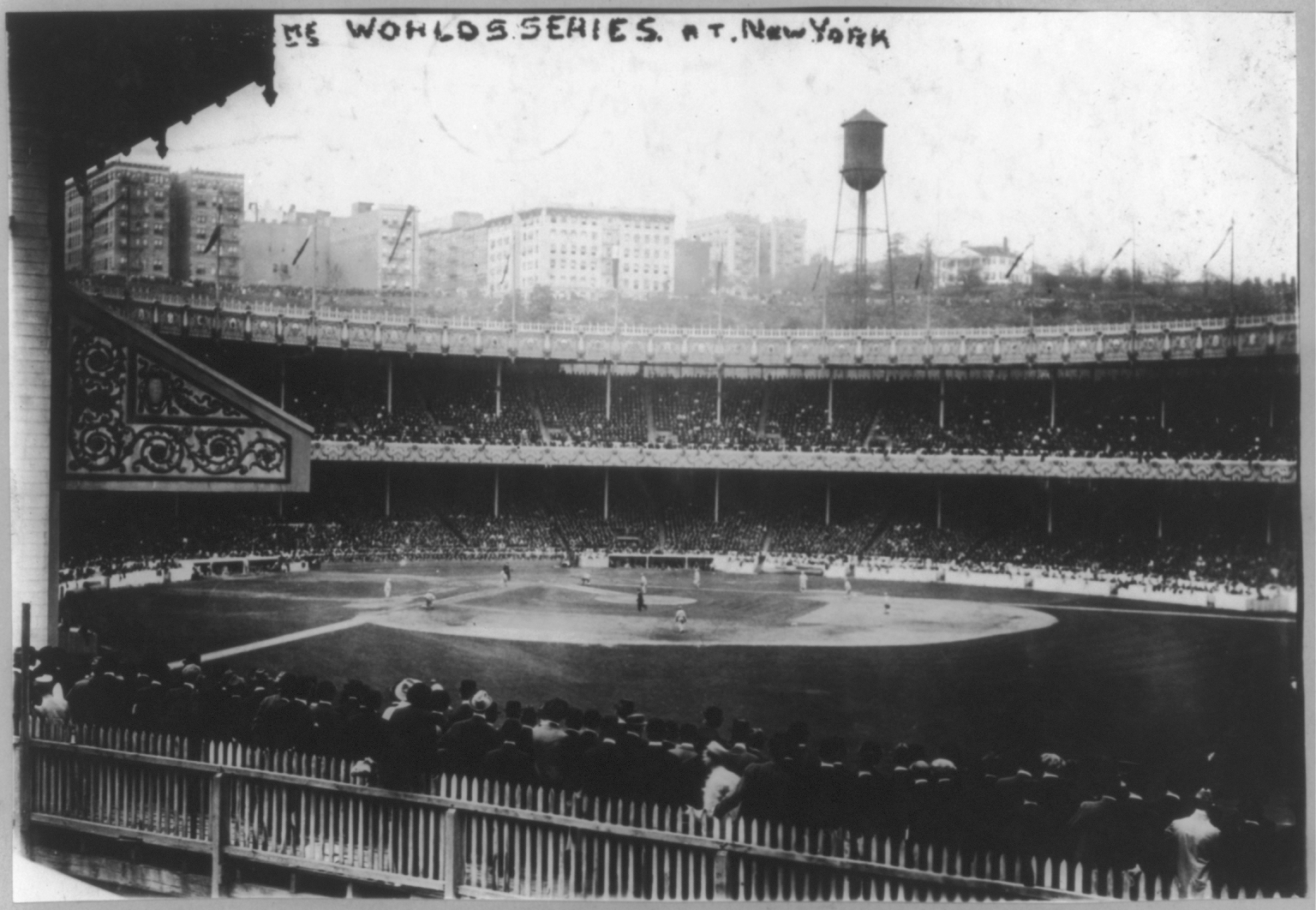
Team (Wins)	Managers	Season
Philadelphia Athletics (4)	Connie Mack	96–57, .627, GA: 6 1/2
New York Giants (1)	John McGraw	101–51, .664, GA: 12 1/2
- Dates: October 7–11
- Venue(s): Brush Stadium (New York); Shibe Park (Philadelphia)
- Umpires: Bill Klem (NL), Tommy Connolly (AL); Cy Rigler (NL), Rip Egan (AL)
- Hall of Famers: Umpires: Bill Klem; Tommy Connolly; Athletics: Connie Mack (manager); Frank Baker; Chief Bender; Eddie Collins; Herb Pennock (DNP); Eddie Plank; Giants: John McGraw (manager); Rube Marquard; Christy Mathewson

World Series program
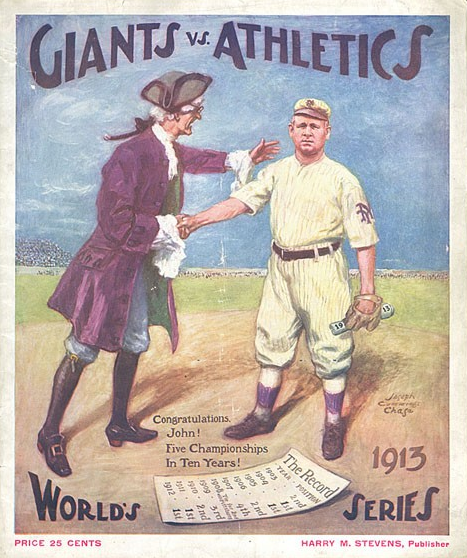

The 1913 World Series was the championship series in Major League Baseball for the 1913 season. The tenth edition of the World Series, it matched the American League (AL) champion Philadelphia Athletics against the National League (NL) New York Giants. The Athletics won the Series four games to one.

The A's pitching gave the edge to a closer-than-it-looked Series in 1913. Christy Mathewson lost his Series swan song in the final game to an old college rival and eventual fellow Baseball Hall of Fame member, Eddie Plank. With previous victories in 1910 and 1911, the Athletics became the first team to win the World Series three times.

The Giants, meanwhile, became the first National League team since the Chicago Cubs (1906–1908) to win three consecutive pennants. They were also the second club (following the Detroit Tigers 1907–1909) to lose the World Series three consecutive times and remain the last to do so.

The Series itself was a face-off between two teams that later became crosstown rivals in Oakland and San Francisco. The Oakland Athletics won again in a four-game sweep in the 1989 World Series, famous for the earthquake that struck before Game 3, which is the last World Series victory for the team.

== Summary ==
AL Philadelphia Athletics (4) vs. NL New York Giants (1)

Game	Date	Score	Location	Time	Attendance
1	October 7	Philadelphia Athletics – 6, New York Giants – 4	Brush Stadium	2:06	36,292
2	October 8	New York Giants – 3, Philadelphia Athletics – 0 (10)	Shibe Park	2:22	20,563
3	October 9	Philadelphia Athletics – 8, New York Giants – 2	Brush Stadium	2:11	36,896
4	October 10	New York Giants – 5, Philadelphia Athletics – 6	Shibe Park	2:09	20,568
5	October 11	Philadelphia Athletics – 3, New York Giants – 1	Brush Stadium	1:39	36,632

== Matchups ==
V.I.P.'s attend Game 2 at Shibe Park

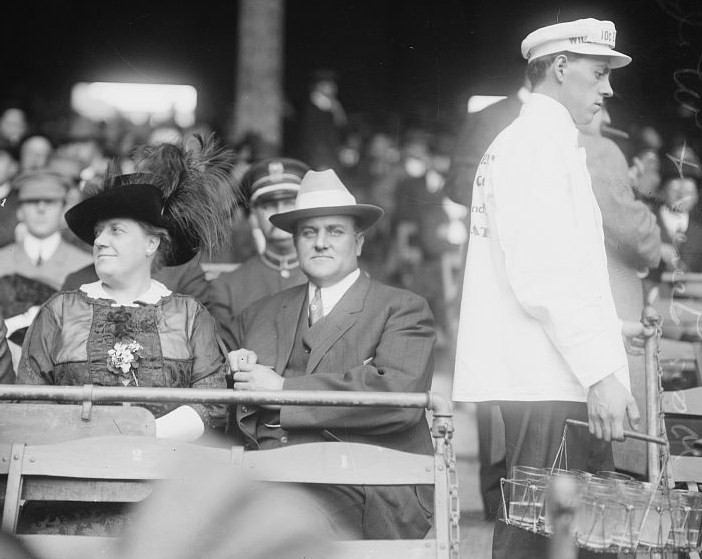
Pennsylvania governor John Kinley Tener and his wife, Harriet

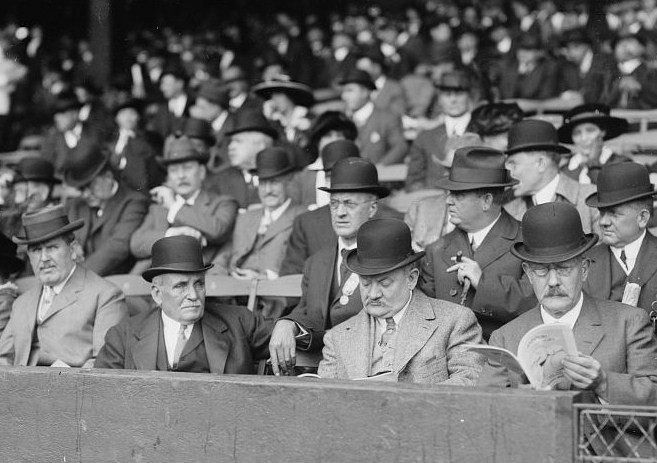
Baseball execs Ed McKeever (Brooklyn NL), Ben Shibe (Phila. AL), Garry Herrmann and Joseph Flanner (Cincinnati NL) (Front, L–R)

=== Game 1 ===
Tuesday, October 7, 1913 2:00 pm (ET) at Brush Stadium in Manhattan, New York
Team	1	2	3	4	5	6	7	8	9	R	H	E
Philadelphia	0	0	0	3	2	0	0	1	0	6	11	1
New York	0	0	1	0	3	0	0	0	0	4	11	0
WP: Chief Bender (1–0) LP: Rube Marquard (0–1); Home runs: PHA: Home Run Baker (1); NYG: None

In the opener, Home Run Baker drove in three runs with three hits for the A's, including a home run. Eddie Collins went 3-for-3 and scored three runs. Despite giving up four runs and 11 hits, Chief Bender held on for a 6–4 win. The Giants struck first in the bottom of the third when Fred Merkle hit a leadoff single, moved to second on a sacrifice bunt, and scored on Larry Doyle's single, but in the fourth, Eddie Collins hit a leadoff triple and scored on Baker's single. After a fielder's choice and double, Wally Schang's triple scored two more runs. Baker's two-run home run after a walk in the fifth made it 5–1 Philadelphia. The Giants cut the lead to 5–4 in the bottom of the inning when after two singles and a groundout, an error Doyle's ground ball, Art Fletcher's RBI single, and George Burns's groundout scored a run each. The A's got an insurance run in the eighth off of Doc Crandall on Stuffy McInnis's RBI double.

=== Game 2 ===
Wednesday, October 8, 1913 2:00 pm (ET) at Shibe Park in Philadelphia, Pennsylvania
Team	1	2	3	4	5	6	7	8	9	10	R	H	E
New York	0	0	0	0	0	0	0	0	0	3	3	7	2
Philadelphia	0	0	0	0	0	0	0	0	0	0	0	8	2
WP: Christy Mathewson (1–0) LP: Eddie Plank (0–1)

Mathewson and Plank matched craft and guile. In the bottom of the ninth inning of a scoreless game, the Giants put on a stirring baseball version of the "goal-line stand". With none out, the A's had Amos Strunk on third and Jack Barry on second. The next batter, Jack Lapp, grounded to first, where Hooks Wiltse, a pitcher, was filling in. Wiltse made a good stop and threw home to nab Strunk. With Barry on third now and Lapp on first, Plank grounded to Wiltse and Hooks fired home again, getting a sliding Barry. Mathewson retired the next hitter, and the game went into extra innings. In the top of the tenth the Giants broke the ice with three runs, with Mathewson singling in the winning run after a leadoff single and sacrifice bunt and then completing the extra-inning shutout by retiring the A's in their half of the tenth. After Mathewson's single, an error and hit-by-pitch loaded the bases before Art Fletcher drove in two insurance runs with a single.

=== Game 3 ===
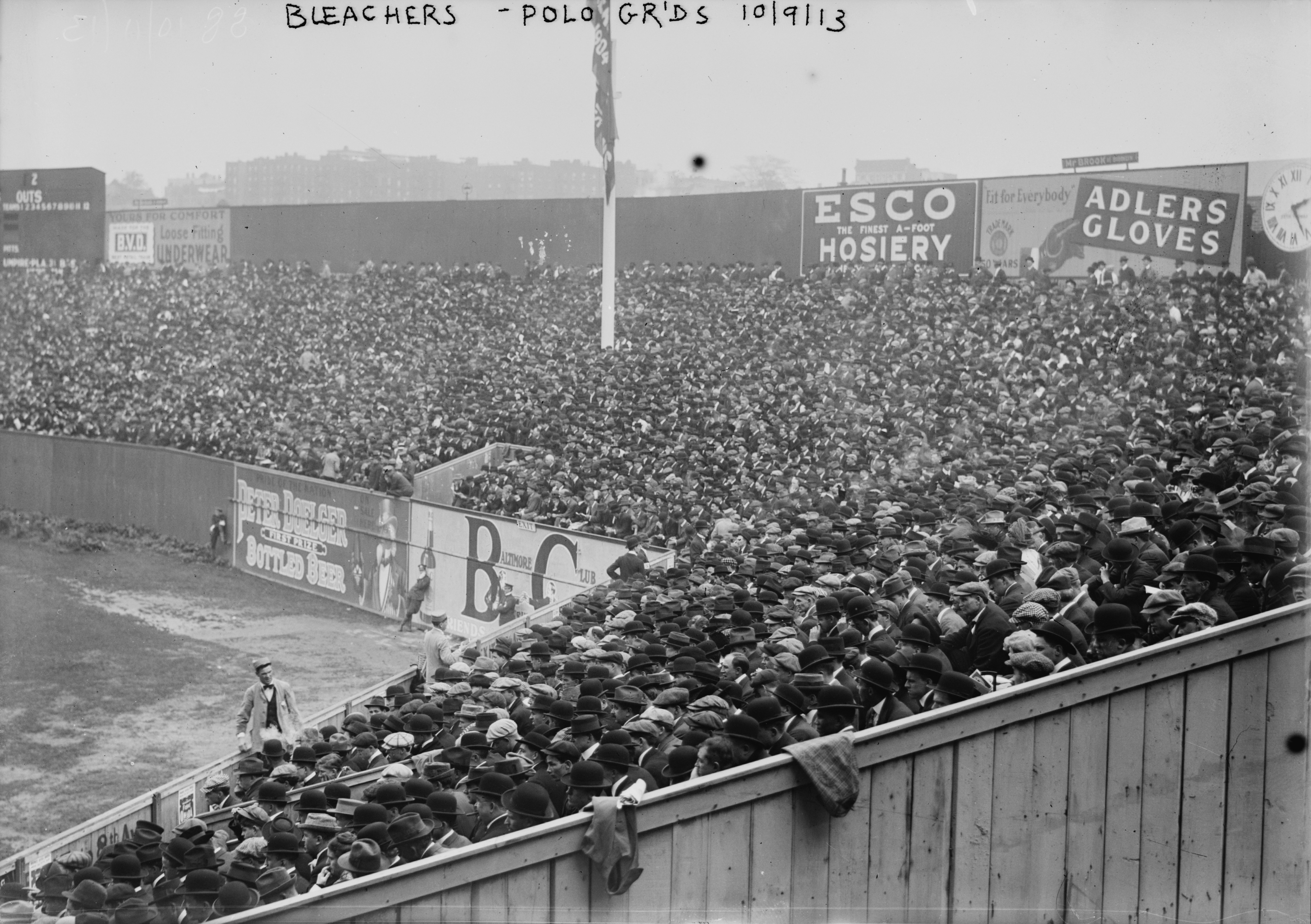
Crowds at Brush Stadium before Game 3 of the World Series

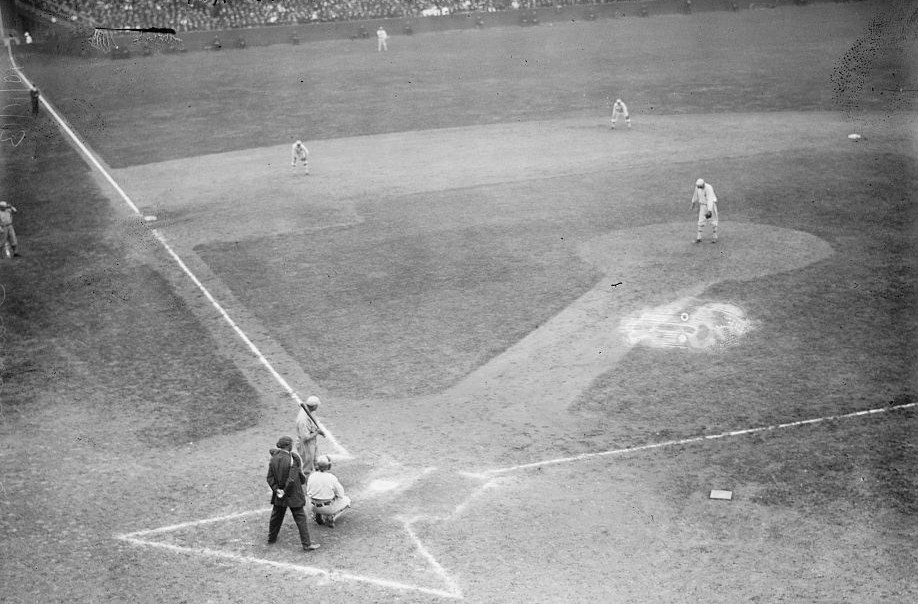
Game 4 at Shibe: Doc Crandall at the plate, Chief Bender on the hill

Thursday, October 9, 1913 2:00 pm (ET) at Brush Stadium in Manhattan, New York
Team	1	2	3	4	5	6	7	8	9	R	H	E
Philadelphia	3	2	0	0	0	0	2	1	0	8	12	1
New York	0	0	0	0	1	0	1	0	0	2	5	1
WP: Bullet Joe Bush (1–0) LP: Jeff Tesreau (0–1); Home runs: PHA: Wally Schang (1); NYG: None

Eddie Collins had three hits and three RBI, and Bullet Joe Bush threw a five-hitter to put the A's ahead in the series. Jeff Tesreau allowed three straight one-out singles in the first, the last of which to Home Run Baker scoring a run. After a double steal and strike out, and error on Amos Strunk's ground ball scored two more runs. The A's made it 5–0 next inning on Eddie Collins's two-run single. The Giants got on the board in the fifth when Red Murray drew a leadoff walk, stole second, moved to third on an error and scored on Larry McLean's single. The A's added to their lead in the seventh when Collins's triple and Home Run Baker's single scored a run each. The Giants scored their last run of the game in the bottom of the inning when Tillie Shafer hit a leadoff double and scored on Red Murray's single. Wally Schang's home run in the eighth off of Doc Crandall closed the scoring at 8–2 A's.

=== Game 4 ===
Friday, October 10, 1913 2:00 pm (ET) at Shibe Park in Philadelphia, Pennsylvania
Team	1	2	3	4	5	6	7	8	9	R	H	E
New York	0	0	0	0	0	0	3	2	0	5	8	2
Philadelphia	0	1	0	3	2	0	0	0	X	6	9	0
WP: Chief Bender (2–0) LP: Al Demaree (0–1); Home runs: NYG: Fred Merkle (1); PHA: None

The home team won for the first time in the series, although the visiting Giants made it close in the late innings. Wally Schang had four RBI for the A's, they now had a 3–1 series lead. Just like in Game 1, Bender struggled but went the distance for his second win of the series. The A's struck first in the bottom of the second when Stuffy McInnis hit a leadoff single, moved to second on a sacrifice bunt and scored on Jack Barry's double. In the fourth, Wally Schang's single scored two and an error on Chief Bender's ground ball scored another. Next inning, after a two-out walk and double off of Rube Marquard, Wally Schang's two-run double made it 6–0 A's. The Giants were kept off the scoreboard until Fred Merkle's three-run home run in the seventh. They cut Philadelphia's lead to 6–5 next inning when George Burns's double and Tillie Shafer's triple scored a run each, but could not score again.

=== Game 5 ===
Saturday, October 11, 1913 2:00 pm (ET) at Brush Stadium in Manhattan, New York
Team	1	2	3	4	5	6	7	8	9	R	H	E
Philadelphia	1	0	2	0	0	0	0	0	0	3	6	1
New York	0	0	0	0	1	0	0	0	0	1	2	2
WP: Eddie Plank (1–1) LP: Christy Mathewson (1–1)

Plank led the Athletics to victory, allowing the Giants only two hits, but his own error in the fifth inning cost him a shutout. The A's scored a run in the first on Home Run Baker's sacrifice fly with runners on first and third, then scored two more in the third on Baker's single and Stuffy McInnis's sacrifice fly. The Giants avoided a shutout in the fifth on Larry McLean's RBI single.

This was the A's third series title in four years, having previously won in 1910 and 1911.

== Composite box ==
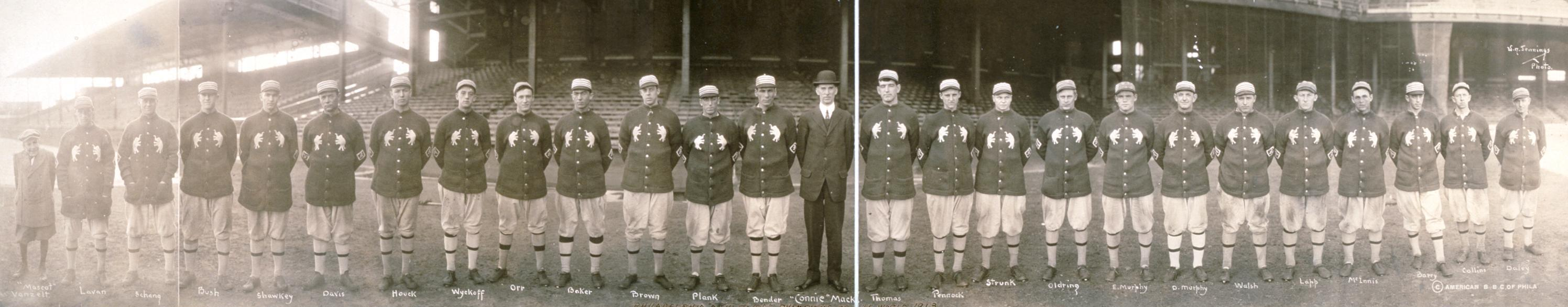
The Athletics World Series team

1913 World Series (4–1): Philadelphia Athletics (A.L.) over New York Giants (N.L.)

Team	1	2	3	4	5	6	7	8	9	10	R	H	E
Philadelphia Athletics	4	3	2	6	4	0	2	2	0	0	23	46	5
New York Giants	0	0	1	0	5	0	4	2	0	3	15	33	7
Total attendance: 150,950 Average attendance: 30,190; Winning player's share: $3,246 Losing player's share: $2,164
