= Charlie Gelbert (American football) =

American football player (1871–1936)

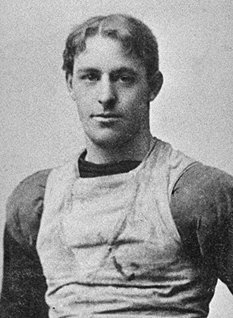

Profile
- Positions: Guard, end

Personal information
- Born: December 24, 1871; Hawley, Pennsylvania, U.S.
- Died: January 16, 1936 (aged 64); Philadelphia, Pennsylvania, U.S.

Career information
- College: Penn

Career history
- 1897–1900: Duquesne Country & A.C.
- 1902: Philadelphia Phillies (NFL)
- 1902: "New York" (WSF)

Awards and highlights
- 2× W. Pennsylvania champion (1898–1899); 3× Consensus All-American (1894–1896)
- College Football Hall of Fame

Charles Gelbert (December 24, 1871 – January 16, 1936) was an American football player, nicknamed "the Miracle Man" because he did so much with so little. He was a four-year starter for the Penn Quakers, from 1893 to 1896, and played guard and end. During his time at Penn, the school's football teams won consecutive national champions with undefeated seasons in 1894 and 1895. He also earned All-American honors from Walter Camp in 1894, 1895, and 1896. He was elected to the College Football Hall of Fame in 1960. In 1912, Jack Kofoed, writing in the Philadelphia Record, named Gelbert to his all-time All-America team.

However Gelbert also played football at the professional level. From 1897 until 1900, he played for the Duquesne Country and Athletic Club. In 1902, he played for the Philadelphia Phillies of the first National Football League. After the Phillies season ended, he played for the "New York team" during the 1902 World Series of Football The team was heavily favored to win the five team tournament, and featured professional football stars Blondy Wallace, Walter E. Bachman and Ben Roller. However, the team was eliminated in the opening match in a 5–0 loss to the Syracuse Athletic Club.

Gelbert also took part in gymnastics. It was said that his acrobatic play would help his defensive play in football when facing off against much larger men. Outside of football he worked as a veterinary surgeon in Scranton, Pennsylvania.

Finally, Charlie was the father of Charlie Gelbert, an infielder with the St. Louis Cardinals, who would go on to win the 1931 World Series.
