= Walter E. Bachman =

American football player and coach (1879–1958)

Biographical details
- Born: March 19, 1879; Phillipsburg, New Jersey, U.S.
- Died: November 11, 1958 (aged 79); Easton, Pennsylvania, U.S.

Playing career
- 1899–1901: Lafayette
- 1902: Philadelphia Phillies
- 1902: New York (WSF)
- Position: Center

Coaching career (HC unless noted)
- 1903: Allegheny
- 1905–1906: Texas A&M

Head coaching record
- Overall: 18–9

Accomplishments and honors

Awards
- 2× consensus All-American (1900, 1901)

Walter Ellsworth "Scrapper" Bachman Sr. (March 19, 1879 – November 11, 1958) was an American college football player and coach. A player at Lafayette College from 1899 until 1901, Bachman developed the "roving center" position for college football. He is regarded as one of the best offensive linemen in Lafayette history. In 1900 he was given second-team All-American honors by Walter Camp and was one of the first players to be given the honor from a school outside of Yale, Harvard, Princeton and Penn. He did also make several other All-American lists that season. In 1901, he was the fourth leading scorer for the Leopards with 25 goals from touchdowns (this was before modern scoring was implemented).

== Early life and education ==
Bachman was born on March 19, 1879, in Phillipsburg, New Jersey.

== Career ==
After graduation, he served as an assistant football coach at Allegheny College in Meadville, Pennsylvania. He then served as the seventh head coach of the Texas A&M Aggies from 1905 to 1906 finishing with a record of 13–3 (.813).

Bachman also had a career in professional football. In 1902 he played for the Philadelphia Phillies of the first National Football League. After the season ended, he became a member of the "New York team" during the World Series of Football The team was heavily favored to win the 5 team tournament, and featured professional football stars Blondy Wallace, Charlie Gelbert and Ben Roller. However, the team was eliminated in the opening match in a 5–0 loss to the Syracuse Athletic Club.

In 1906, he became a yardmaster for the Lehigh Valley Railroad until his retirement in 1944.

== Death ==
He died on November 11, 1958, at Easton Hospital in Easton, Pennsylvania.

== Legacy ==
Bachman was inducted in the Lafayette Maroon Hall of Fame in 1977.

== Head coaching record ==
Year	Team	Overall	Conference	Standing	Bowl/playoffs
Allegheny Gators (Independent) (1903)
1903	Allegheny	5–6			
Allegheny:		5–5			
Texas A&M Aggies (Southern Intercollegiate Athletic Association) (1905–1906)
1905	Texas A&M	7–2	0–1	T–12th	
1906	Texas A&M	6–1	2–1	5th	
Texas A&M:		13–3	2–2		
Total:		18–9			
