= Bull Davidson =

Profile
- Position: Fullback

Career information
- College: Penn

Career history

Playing
- 1902: Philadelphia Football Athletics
- 1902: "New York"
- 1903: Franklin Athletic Club

Coaching
- c.1901: Maryland Athletic Club

Awards and highlights
- Penn Quakers Captain (1901); Penn Quakers Letterman (1901); "US Football Champion" (1903); Football World Series Champion (1903)

H. A. “Bull” Davidson was an early professional American football player for Philadelphia Football Athletics of the 1902 National Football League. He later played in the World Series of Football in 1902 and 1903, held both times at Madison Square Garden in New York City. In 1902, he played for a team simply known as "New York", which comprised ex-players from the recently defunct Philadelphia Football Phillies and Philadelphia Football Athletics of the 1902 National Football League. The following year, he played for the Franklin Athletic Club, which was considered the top team in professional football in 1903 by becoming the unofficial "US Football Champions". Franklin then went on to play in the 1903 World Series of Football, winning the event.

Davidson also coached the professional Maryland Athletic Club, and prior to that played college football for the Penn Quakers, where he lettered and captioned the team in 1901.

He is also referenced by the Pro Football Researchers Association as Curly Davidson.
