= 1902 Philadelphia Athletics (NFL) season =

1902 Philadelphia Athletics season
- Head coach: Blondy Wallace
- Home stadium: Columbia Park

Results
- Record: 10–2–2
- Division place: No divisions
- Playoffs: No playoffs

The 1902 Philadelphia Athletics football season was their first season in existence. The team played in the first National Football League and finished with an overall record of 10–2–2, including a 3–2–1 record in league play. The team claimed to have won the league championship, however the Pittsburgh Stars were given the title for having a better point ratio, scoring 39 points to their NFL opponents' 22.

== Schedule ==
Game	Date	Opponent	Result
1	October 11	at Steelton YMCA	T 0–0
2	**October 18**	**Philadelphia Phillies**	**W 6–0**
3	October 22	at Watertown Red & Black	W 11–5
4	**October 25**	**at Philadelphia Phillies**	**L 0–17**
5	October 29	at Phoenix Athletic Association of Phoenixville	W 23–0
6	November 1	Pennsylvania Railroad YMCA	W 45–0
7	November 4	Orange Athletic Club	W 12–5
8	**November 8**	**Pittsburgh Stars**	**W 11–10**
9	November 21	at Kanaweola Athletic Club	W 39–0
10	November 22	at Athens-Sayer (Pennsylvania)	W 18–0
11	November 24	at Burlingame	W 23–0
12	**November 27**	**at Pittsburgh Stars**	**T 0–0**
13	**November 29**	**at Pittsburgh Stars**	**L 0–11**
14	**December 6**	**at Philadelphia Phillies**	**W 17–6**

- Games between NFL teams are represented in **bold**.
