= 1903 Philadelphia Athletics (NFL) season =

American football team season

1903 Philadelphia Athletics season
- Head coach: Blondy Wallace
- Home stadium: Columbia Park

Results
- Record: 1–0–1
- Division place: No divisions
- Playoffs: No playoffs

The 1903 Philadelphia Athletics football season was their second, and last, season in existence. The team played independently of any league since the first National Football League ceased operations in 1902. The Athletics only played two recorded games in 1903, posting a 1–0–1 record.

== Schedule ==
Game	Date	Opponent	Result	Record
1	October 3	at Watertown Red & Black	T 0–0	0–0–1
2	October 18	at All-Syracuse	W 6–0	1–0–1
