= 1905 World Series =

1905 Major League Baseball championship series

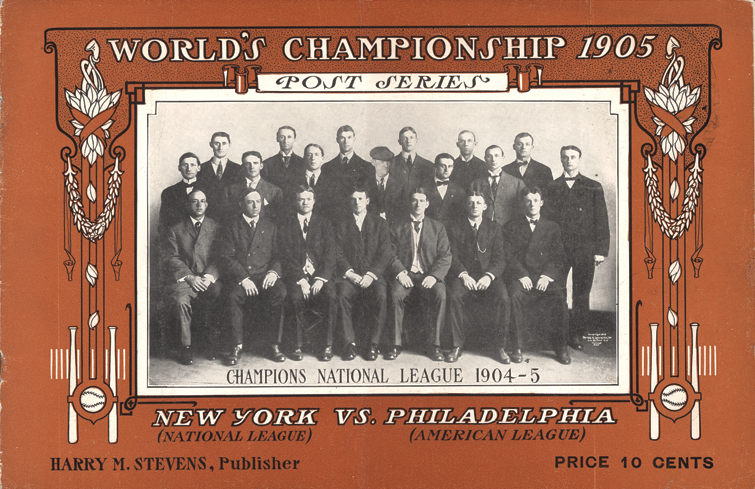
- New York Giants, 1904 and 1905 National League Champions.
Team (Wins)	Managers	Season
New York Giants (4)	John McGraw (player/manager)	105–48, .686, GA: 9
Philadelphia Athletics (1)	Connie Mack	92–56, .622, GA: 2
- Dates: October 9–14
- Venue(s): Columbia Park (Philadelphia); Polo Grounds (New York)
- Umpires: Jack Sheridan (AL); Hank O'Day (NL)
- Hall of Famers: Umpire: Hank O'Day; Giants: John McGraw (mgr.); Roger Bresnahan; Christy Mathewson; Joe McGinnity; Athletics: Connie Mack (mgr.); Chief Bender; Eddie Plank; Rube Waddell (DNP)

The 1905 World Series was the championship series in Major League Baseball for the 1905 season. The National League (NL) champion New York Giants defeated the American League (AL) champion Philadelphia Athletics, with the Giants winning 4 games to 1, now in a best-4-of-7 format. Four of the five games featured duels between future Hall of Fame pitchers. The games were the second edition of the World Series after the initial meeting in 1903, since the 1904 season ended with no Series held, and the first to be officially sanctioned by the leagues and the National Baseball Commission. This was the first professional sports championship ever won by a New York City-based team. This wound up being the first of three World Series matchups between the Athletics and Giants in a span of eight years, with the two teams encountering each other as league champions in 1911 and 1913.

Games 1 and 3 were played in Philadelphia; games 2, 4, 5 in New York.

Each of the five games was a shutout. Three of those, over a six-day span, were pitched and won by Christy Mathewson.

== Summary ==
Before the Series began, the Athletics were already at a major disadvantage. For the Series, they were without the services of Rube Waddell, who was arguably their best pitcher that year. The reason for Waddell's absence was listed as a shoulder injury from some sort of 'wrestling match' with teammate Andy Coakley, though in years since some have speculated that Waddell was actually bribed or 'paid off' to fake the injury and thus not play in the Series. Philadelphia manager Connie Mack, however, refused to believe this theory, finding it ridiculous.

John McGraw, the Giants' manager, had previously referred to the Athletics as a "white elephant", which the club defiantly adopted as a symbolic mascot. At the conference at home plate before Game 1, A's team captain Lave Cross gave McGraw a wrapped package, which turned out to contain a toy white elephant. McGraw responded with a big grin, and the crowd laughed.[Philadelphia Inquirer, October 10, 2005, p. 10] McGraw and the Giants would have the last laugh, easily defeating the A's in the Series.

NL New York Giants (4) vs. AL Philadelphia Athletics (1)

Game	Date	Score	Location	Time	Attendance
1	October 9	New York Giants – 3, Philadelphia Athletics – 0	Columbia Park	1:46	17,955
2	October 10	Philadelphia Athletics – 3, New York Giants – 0	Polo Grounds	1:55	24,992
3	October 12	New York Giants – 9, Philadelphia Athletics – 0	Columbia Park	1:55	10,991
4	October 13	Philadelphia Athletics – 0, New York Giants – 1	Polo Grounds	1:55	13,598
5	October 14	Philadelphia Athletics – 0, New York Giants – 2	Polo Grounds	1:35	24,187

== Matchups ==
=== Game 1 ===
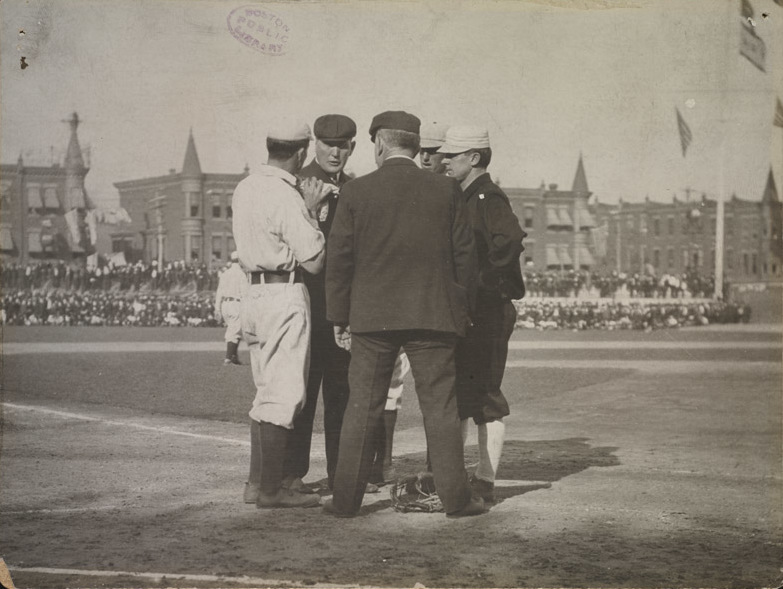
Conference on the field during one of the games at Columbia Park.

Monday, October 9, 1905 at Columbia Park in Philadelphia, Pennsylvania
Team	1	2	3	4	5	6	7	8	9	R	H	E
New York	0	0	0	0	2	0	0	0	1	3	10	1
Philadelphia	0	0	0	0	0	0	0	0	0	0	4	0
WP: Christy Mathewson (1–0) LP: Eddie Plank (0–1); Boxscore

The opening game was a pitchers' duel between Christy Mathewson and Eddie Plank. Both got out of jams, shutting the opposing offense down. In the Giants' top of the fifth, Mathewson singled, but was forced by Roger Bresnahan, who stole second shortly afterwards. After George Browne popped out, Mike Donlin singled to left, scoring Bresnahan and advancing Donlin to second. After Dan McGann walked, Sam Mertes doubled, bringing home Donlin. In the Athletics' half of the sixth, Ossee Schreckengost doubled and advanced to third on a wild pitch, but did not score, and was the lone runner to reach third base against Mathewson in the entire series. The Giants added an insurance run in the ninth, when Billy Gilbert scored on Bresnahan's single. This was the first of Mathewson's three complete-game shutouts, a World Series record that may never be matched.

=== Game 2 ===
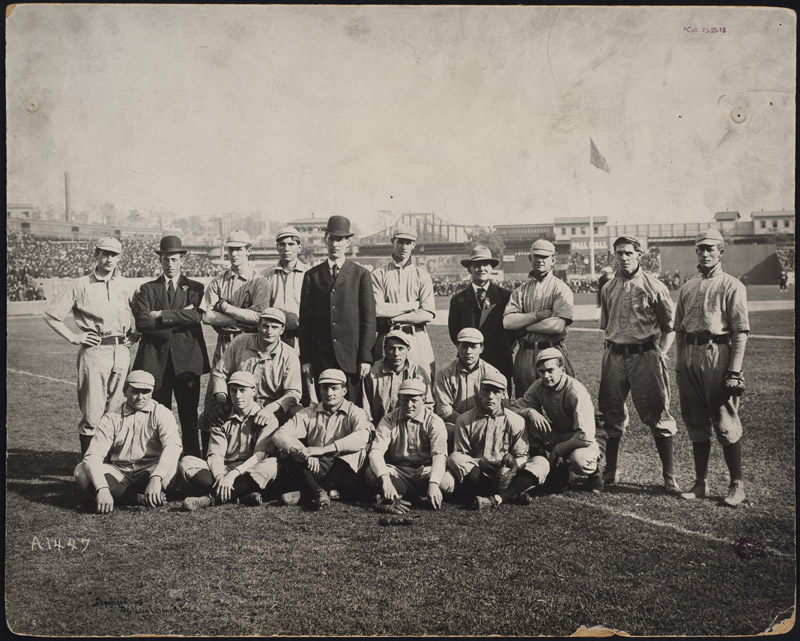
Philadelphia Athletics and Connie Mack before one of the games at the Polo Grounds.

Tuesday, October 10, 1905 at Polo Grounds (III) in Upper Manhattan, New York
Team	1	2	3	4	5	6	7	8	9	R	H	E
Philadelphia	0	0	1	0	0	0	0	2	0	3	6	2
New York	0	0	0	0	0	0	0	0	0	0	4	2
WP: Chief Bender (1–0) LP: Joe McGinnity (0–1); Boxscore

The A's called on Chief Bender to turn the tables on the Giants. His opponent was 21-game winner "Iron Man" Joe McGinnity. The game was scoreless until the top of the third. Ossee Schreckengost, leading off, reached on a Dan McGann's error. Bender sacrificed, moving Schreckengost to second. After a groundout by Topsy Hartsel moved Schreckengost to third, Bris Lord singled to left and drove Ossee home with an unearned run. The slim margin held until the top of the eighth, when the A's scored multiple times. With one out, Schreckengost was once again the catalyst, singling to center. After Bender flied out to right field, Hartsel's double scored Schreckengost all the way from first (helped by an error from Bresnahan), and a single by Lord brought Hartsel home, making it 3–0 in favor of the A's with all three runs unearned. Bender continued to cruise, got out of late-inning jams and ended up with a complete-game shutout that tied the series at one game each.

=== Game 3 ===
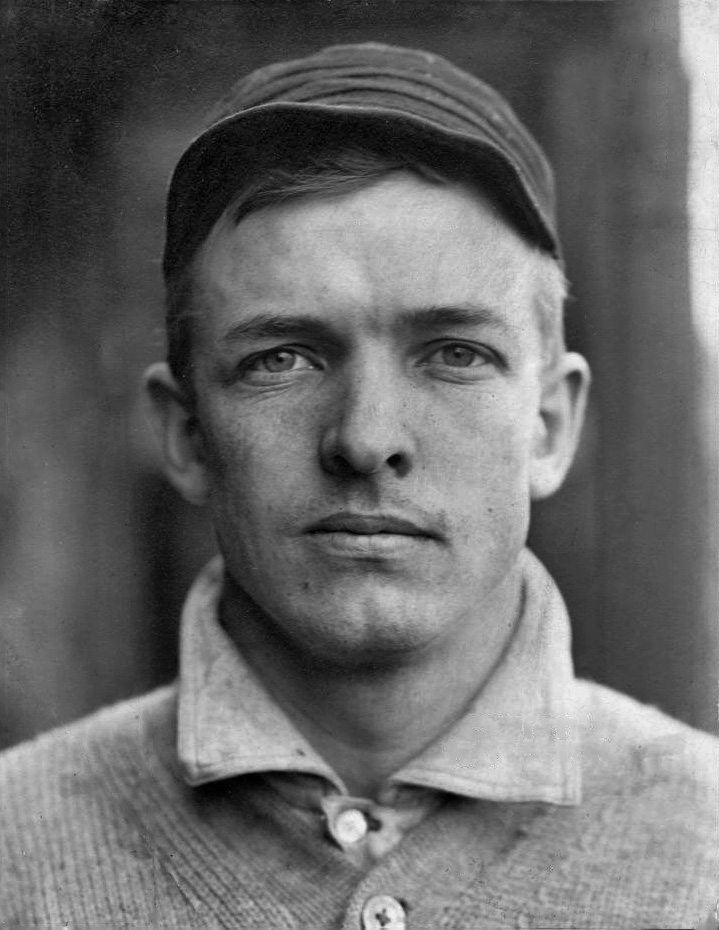
Christy Mathewson, winning pitcher of Games 1, 3, and 5

Thursday, October 12, 1905 at Columbia Park in Philadelphia, Pennsylvania
Team	1	2	3	4	5	6	7	8	9	R	H	E
New York	2	0	0	0	5	0	0	0	2	9	9	1
Philadelphia	0	0	0	0	0	0	0	0	0	0	4	4
WP: Christy Mathewson (2–0) LP: Andy Coakley (0–1); Boxscore

Christy Mathewson once again took the mound for the Giants in Game 3. Opposing him this time was Andy Coakley, who hit the first batter he faced, Roger Bresnahan, with a pitch. A single to right by Mike Donlin moved Bresnahan to third with one out. Dan McGann singled to right, bringing Bresnahan home. An error by Danny Murphy scored Donlin and put Sam Mertes on base. Bill Dahlen walked, loading the bases with one out, but Art Devlin hit into a double play to end the rally. The Giants put the game away in the top of the fifth. Bresnahan walked with one out. George Browne singled and went to second on the throw to third base. Donlin was walked intentionally, setting up a possible inning-ending double play, but things continued to crumble for Coakley and the A's. McGann reached on another error by Danny Murphy, reloading the bases and scoring a run. Mertes singled, reloading the bases and driving in another run. Bill Dahlen hit into a force play at second, scoring Donlin. After Dahlen stole second, Devlin singled, bringing home McGann and sending Dahlen to third. Devlin then stole second and Dahlen stole home on a double steal, scoring the fifth and last run of the Giants' fifth. They scored two more runs in the top of the ninth, when McGann doubled home Browne and Donlin. Mathewson pitched his second complete-game shutout, giving the Giants a 2–1 lead in the series. This was the first 9–0 World Series game—the next one occurred when the Cubs shut out the Tigers by that lopsided score in Game 1 in 1945, although Detroit ended up taking that series four games to three.

=== Game 4 ===
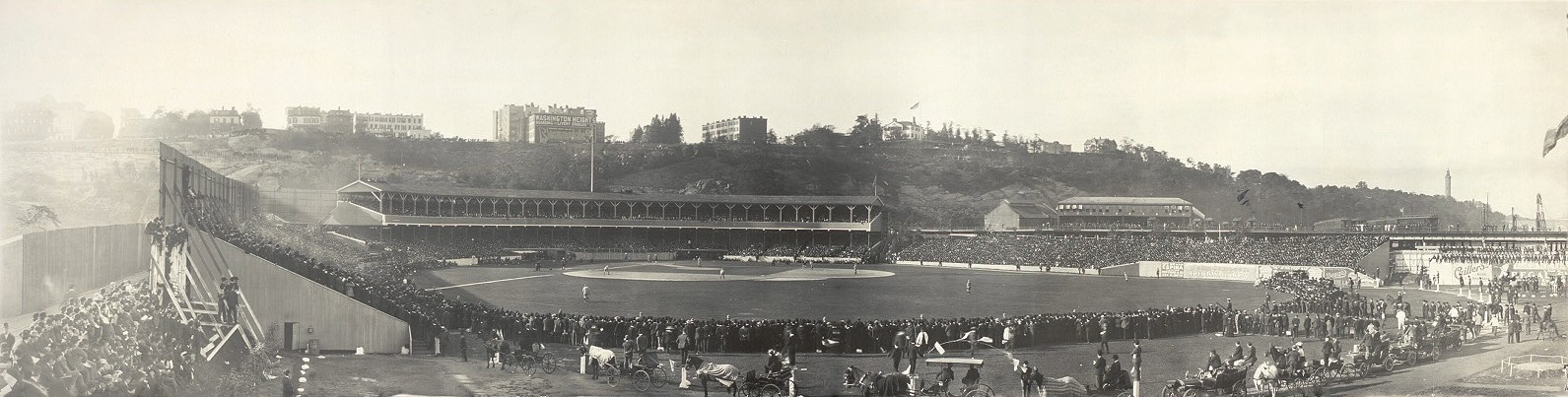
The Polo Grounds during one of the games.

Friday, October 13, 1905 at Polo Grounds (III) in Upper Manhattan, New York
Team	1	2	3	4	5	6	7	8	9	R	H	E
Philadelphia	0	0	0	0	0	0	0	0	0	0	5	1
New York	0	0	0	1	0	0	0	0	X	1	5	0
WP: Joe McGinnity (1–1) LP: Eddie Plank (0–2); Boxscore

Eddie Plank returned for the A's against Joe McGinnity for the Giants in Game 4. Both left men on base in scoring position early on, and kept the game scoreless until the bottom of the fourth, when Sam Mertes led off the inning by reaching on an error by Monte Cross. After Bill Dahlen flied to right Art Devlin grounded out, moving Mertes to second. With two outs, Billy Gilbert singled to left, bringing Mertes home for the only run of the game, McGinnity outdueling Plank 1–0 and giving the Giants a three-games-to-one lead.

=== Game 5 ===
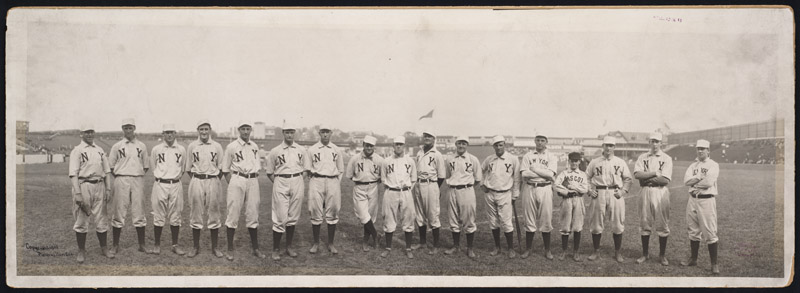
New York Giants at the Polo Grounds before one of the games.

Saturday, October 14, 1905 at Polo Grounds (III) in Upper Manhattan, New York
Team	1	2	3	4	5	6	7	8	9	R	H	E
Philadelphia	0	0	0	0	0	0	0	0	0	0	5	0
New York	0	0	0	0	1	0	0	1	X	2	5	2
WP: Christy Mathewson (3–0) LP: Chief Bender (1–1); Boxscore

The Giants looked to wrap up the series behind the perennial Christy Mathewson, who faced Chief Bender this time. The game was scoreless until the bottom of the fifth, when Sam Mertes scored during a bizarre double play involving Bill Dahlen and Billy Gilbert; with one out, Mertes on third, and Dahlen on second, Gilbert hit a sacrifice fly that scored Mertes, but Dahlen was out attempting to advance to third, and this third out was recorded after Mertes had scored. In the eighth, the Giants got an insurance run when Mathewson scored on George Browne's ground out after Roger Bresnahan's double had sent him to third with less than two out. Mathewson then took the mound for the top of the ninth and induced three ground outs, thereby completing arguably the single greatest performance by any player in World Series history with his third complete-game shutout of the series.

== Composite line score ==
1905 World Series (4–1): New York Giants (N.L.) over Philadelphia Athletics (A.L.)

Team	1	2	3	4	5	6	7	8	9	R	H	E
New York Giants	2	0	0	1	8	0	0	1	3	15	33	6
Philadelphia Athletics	0	0	1	0	0	0	0	2	0	3	24	7
Total attendance: 91,723 Average attendance: 18,345; Winning player's share: $1,142 Losing player's share: $832

== Firsts and records ==
- This was the first best-of-seven World Series, as opposed to the best-of-nine 1903 World Series.
- The Philadelphia Athletics became the first team to lose a World Series game 1–0 on an unearned run.
- It was the only World Series consisting entirely of complete-game shutouts. Only one reliever was used in the entire Series, Red Ames for Joe McGinnity in the ninth inning of Game 2.
- The New York Giants did not yield a single earned run in this Series, thereby setting a postseason record for lowest team ERA of 0.00 that was not matched until the Atlanta Braves had a team ERA of 0.00 during the 2020 National League Wild Card Series against the Cincinnati Reds.
- The first steal of home during the World Series occurred during the fifth inning of Game 3, by New York's Bill Dahlen on the front end of a double steal.
- Both managers and four of the five starting pitchers are now in the Hall of Fame. The exception is Andy Coakley, who started Game 3 for Philadelphia.
