= 1902 Philadelphia Phillies (NFL) season =

American football season

1902 Philadelphia Phillies season
- Head coach: Ben Roller
- Home stadium: National League Park

Results
- Record: 8–3
- Division place: No divisions
- Playoffs: No playoffs

The 1902 Philadelphia Phillies football season was their second season in existence. This season the team, was sponsored by the Philadelphia Phillies Baseball Club and played in the first National Football League. The team finished with an overall record of 8–3, including a 2–3 record in league play to finish third in the standings.

== Schedule ==
Game	Date	Opponent	Result
1	October 4	at Steelton YMCA	W 10–0
2	October 10	Orange Athletic Club	Cancelled
3	**October 18**	**at Philadelphia Athletics**	**L 0–6**
4	**October 25**	**Philadelphia Athletics**	**W 17–0**
5	November 1	at Phoenix Athletic Association of Phoenixville	W 23–0
6	**November 4**	**at Pittsburgh Stars**	**L 0–18**
7	November 8	at Wilmington Athletic Association	W 28–0
8	November 12	Orange Athletic Club	W 40–0
9	November 15	at Harrisburg Athletic Club	W 18–0
10	**November 22**	**Pittsburgh Stars**	**W 11–0**
11	November 27	at Orange Athletic Club	W 12–0
12	**December 6**	**Philadelphia Athletics**	**L 6–17**

- Games between NFL teams are represented in **bold**.
