= New York (World Series of Football) =

Defunct American football team (1902)

General information
- Founded: 1902
- Folded: 1902
- Stadium: Madison Square Garden
- Headquartered: New York, New York, United States
- Colors: Unknown

Personnel
- Head coach: Blondy Wallace

Nicknames
- New Yorks; New York Philadelphians

Team history
- "New York" (1902)

League / conference affiliations
- World Series of Football

"New York" (the New Yorks or the New York Philadelphians) was a professional football team formed by promoter Tom O'Rouke for the World Series of Football in 1902. The event was held in New York City at Madison Square Garden. It featured five football teams from New York and New Jersey: the Syracuse Athletic Club, Orange Athletic Club, Knickerbocker Athletic Club, Warlow Athletic Club and "New York". The "New York" team was designed and heavily favored to win the tournament. However, they were defeated in the opening game by Syracuse.

== Origins ==
The "New York" team comprised ex-players from the recently defunct Philadelphia Phillies and Philadelphia Athletics of the first National Football League – eight Phillies and four Athletics. It included Charlie Gelbert, Blondy Wallace, Walter E. Bachman and Ben Roller. However, the team also featured some recognizable players from New York such as Curly Davidson. By putting together a team of all-stars calling them the "New York" team, O'Rourke expected to give his New York audience the pleasure of watching the "home team" win.

The tournament was scheduled to last three nights starting on December 29 and ending on New Year's Eve. O'Rourke scheduled his tournament by considering the expected strengths of the teams. On opening night, he scheduled the "New York" team against Syracuse. By defeating Syracuse, the "New York" team, O'Rouke hoped, would then defeat the team that would probably bring the fewest fans into the Garden. Then on the second night, the Knickerbockers and Warlow would play to determine which team would be beaten by the "New York" team in the series' third game. O'Rourke anticipated this game as having the best attendance of the tourney. Finally in the fourth game, by holding out the Orange Athletic Club until the end, he predicted a New York versus New Jersey match-up in which New Jersey would lose a close game to one of the three New York teams.

== Opening game vs. Syracuse ==
O'Rourke didn't realize how seriously the Syracuse team took the tournament. The team was put together by Frank "Buck" O'Neill who conducted daily practices in preparation for the series. Syracuse defeated "New York" in what has been called the first indoor pro football game. The final score of the game was recorded as 6–0, but in reality it was 5–0, since touchdowns only counted for five points in 1902 and Syracuses' Glenn Scobey "Pop" Warner missed the extra point. Warner later suffered a head injury and was replaced by "New York's" Blondy Wallace. Syracuse would go on to win the Series with a 36–0 win over the Orange Athletic Club.
