= Philadelphia Athletics (NFL) =

Professional football team (1902)

Logo

General information
- Founded: 1902
- Folded: 1903
- Stadium: Columbia Park
- Headquartered: Philadelphia, United States
- Colors: Navy, White

Personnel
- Owner: Ben Shibe
- General manager: Connie Mack
- Head coach: Blondy Wallace

Nickname
- A's

Team history
- Philadelphia Athletics (1902)

League / conference affiliations
- National Football League (1902)

The Philadelphia Athletics were a professional American football team based in Philadelphia and founded in 1902. The team was a member of the 1902 National Football League (which has no connection to the active National Football League). The league comprised a curious mixture of baseball and football players.

== Origins ==
The Philadelphia Athletics began as part of the baseball wars between the National League and the new American League that began in 1901. In Philadelphia, the America League's Philadelphia Athletics lured several of the National League's Philadelphia Phillies from their contracts, only to lose them again through court action. When the Phillies' owner, John Rogers, decided to start a football team, the Athletics followed suit, both naming the football teams after their respective baseball teams. The Athletics' owner, Ben Shibe, fielded a team made up of several baseball players as well as some local football players. He appointed his baseball manager, Connie Mack, as the team's general manager, and named former University of Pennsylvania player Blondy Wallace as the team's coach.

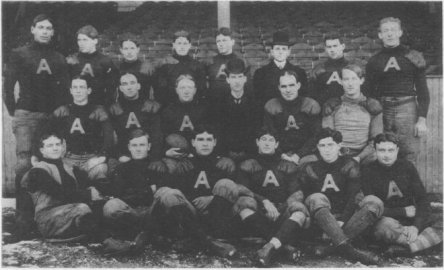
1902 Philadelphia Athletis of the National Football League; Connie Mack sits at center of team wearing derby hat.

Roger and Shibe enlisted the support of Dave Berry, a pro football promoter, to establish a football team in Pittsburgh, the Pittsburgh Stars. These three teams made up the entirety of the 1902 NFL.

== First Stars game ==
The league played all of its games on Saturdays as Pennsylvania's blue laws at the time prohibited Sunday sports events. The teams began playing various colleges and local football clubs before finally playing each other. On November 8, 1902, the Pittsburgh Stars traveled to Philadelphia to play the Athletics. In the first half, the Pittsburgh stars scored two touchdowns but failed on each extra point attempt (PAT). It had to be kicked from a point straight out from where the ball crossed the goal line on the TD. If the angle was bad, the scoring team's fullback punted the ball out into the field from behind the goal line. The extra point man had to first field the punt-out, and then kick from where he'd caught the ball. If the fullback couldn't give the kicker good field position, it would be more difficult to achieve a successful try. The Athletics also got a touchdown and added the point. Until 1912, a touchdown counted as only five points, so the score at the half stood 10–6. The Athletics then added a second-half field goal, which was also worth five points, the same as a touchdown. Under modern scoring, the game would have been a 12-10 Pittsburgh victory. In 1902 scoring, it was 11–10.

== First championship try ==
The Athletics split during the 1902 season. Although a Philadelphia victory on Thanksgiving Day could give the Athletics the championship, a win by the Stars could tie the league race tighter. The game was billed as the championship game by Dave Berry, the league president and manager of the Stars.

Mack prepared the Athletics for the game by playing an exhibition tour through northern Pennsylvania and southern New York. In Elmira, New York, the Athletics joined in the first night game in pro football history.

When Mack agreed to the championship game, he was promised $2,000 in return for his team's participation. When he saw that the stands were practically empty, he refused to play until his team was paid their share of the gate. The game begun after Mack received a check for $2,000 from William Corey, the head of Carnegie Steel, and resulted in a scoreless tie.

== 1902 championship ==
Another championship game was soon planned between Berry and Mack. The spectator turnout was 2,000. Neither team had scored a point until a late fumble led to a touchdown by the Pittsburgh Stars and another touchdown soon followed, making them win the championship. Afterwards, the Athletics beat the Phillies, winning them second place.

== Controversy ==
The Athletics' players called the championship against the Pittsburgh Stars an exhibition, and declared themselves the champions. However, the actual results were recognized by all parties at the time of the championship game. Berry used his power as league president to name the Stars as the 1905 champions.

The 1902 World Series of Football was held at Madison Square Garden in New York City. While neither the Phillies nor the Athletics participated in this event, several members of both squads joined a team known as either the New York, the New Yorks or the New York Philadelphians. The team played in the first indoor football game against the Syracuse Athletic Club. The Philadelphia Athletics Football Club finished the 1902 season with $4,000 in debt. Mack reorganized the team for the 1903 season, but they only played two games before folding, a 0–12 defeat at the hands of the Watertown Red & Black and a 6–0 victory over the All-Syracuse eleven.

== Seasons ==
- 1902 Philadelphia Athletics (NFL) season
- 1903 Philadelphia Athletics (NFL) season
