= 1902 Pittsburgh Stars season =

American football team season

- Head coach: Willis Richardson
- Home stadium: Pittsburgh Coliseum

Results
- Record: 9–2–1
- Division place: No divisions
- Playoffs: No playoffs

The 1902 Pittsburgh Stars football season was their first and only season in existence. The team played in the first National Football League and finished with an overall record of 9–2–1, including a 2–2–1 record in league play. The team was named the league's champions for having a better point ratio, scoring 39 points to their NFL opponents' 22.

== Schedule ==
Game	Date	Opponent	Result
1	October 11	Pennsylvania Railroad YMCA	W 30–0
2	October 16	Cottage Athletic Club	W 17–0
3	October 18	Bucknell University	W 24–0
4	October 22	Pittsburgh College	W 45–0
5	October 25	East End Athletic Club	W 18–0
6	November 1	Cottage Athletic Club	W 24–0
7	**November 4**	**Philadelphia Phillies**	**W 18–0**
8	**November 8**	**at Philadelphia Athletics**	**L 10–11**
9	November 15	East End Athletic Club	W 18–0
10	**November 22**	**at Philadelphia Phillies**	**L 0–11**
11	**November 27**	**Philadelphia Athletics**	**T 0–0**
12	**November 29**	**Philadelphia Athletics**	**W 11–0**

- Games between NFL teams are represented in **bold**.
