= John Rogers (baseball) =

American baseball executive (1844–1910)

John Ignatius Rogers
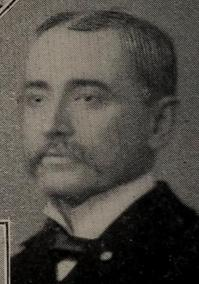
- Born: May 27, 1844; Philadelphia, Pennsylvania, United States
- Died: March 13, 1910 (aged 65); Denver, Colorado, United States
- Education: University of Pennsylvania
- Occupations: Owner of Philadelphia Phillies baseball and Philadelphia Phillies football teams, attorney, politician
- Spouse(s): Elizabeth H. Henkels, January 20, 1876
- Children: 5

John Ignatius Rogers (May 27, 1844, Philadelphia, Pennsylvania – March 13, 1910, Denver, Colorado), was part-owner of the Philadelphia Phillies from 1883 to 1899, and majority owner from 1899 to 1903. He also owned the Philadelphia Phillies of the short-lived National Football League of 1902.

Rogers was born to Irish immigrant parents in Philadelphia on May 27, 1844. He earned his law degree at the University of Pennsylvania, and was admitted to the bar in 1865. Rogers was elected the city comptroller in 1880. As a member of the City Troop/(First Troop Philadelphia City Cavalry), he participated in the quelling of the Pittsburgh riots during the Great Railroad Strike of 1877. Rogers was later appointed Judge Advocate General of the Philadelphia National Guard, with the rank of colonel.

A prominent attorney and politician in Philadelphia, Rogers came to the baseball business when former player and sporting goods magnate Al Reach consulted with him on a patent for a baseball. Rogers and Reach later teamed up to acquire the remnants of the Worcester Worcesters in 1883, winning the rights to the franchise via drawing of lots. Reach and Rogers relocated the franchise to Philadelphia, where they became known as the Quakers (they would later become the Phillies), entering the team as an expansion franchise in the National League in 1883. During these early days, Rogers was involved in creating baseball's reserve clause, which would remain in effect until the era of free agency.

Reach and Rogers sold the Phillies to a group led by James Potter in February 1903, but retained the rights to the team's stadium, National League Park (which eventually became Baker Bowl). On August 8, a balcony collapsed at the park, killing 12 people and injuring hundreds more. Rogers was nearly ruined by the resulting avalanche of lawsuits, and was forced to sell the stadium to Potter as well. Eventually, both Rogers and Reach were absolved of blame and financial responsibility for the accident by the U.S. Supreme Court.

Rogers died of heart failure in his room at the Brown Palace Hotel in Denver, Colorado on March 13, 1910.

== External Sources ==
John I. Rogers at SABR Bio Project
