= Columbia Park =

Former baseball park in Philadelphia (1901-1908)

Coordinates: 39°58′52″N 75°10′58″W

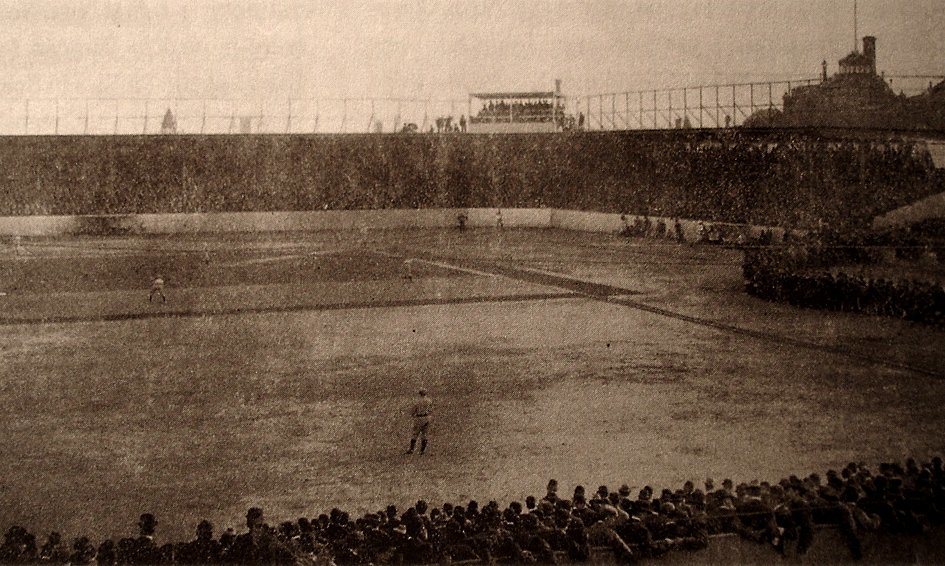
- Columbia Park in 1901 or 1902.
- Interactive map of Columbia Park
- Location: 2900 Cecil B Moore Avenue; Philadelphia, Pennsylvania 19121
- Owner: Philadelphia Athletics
- Capacity: 9,500 (1901); 13,600 (1905)
- Surface: Grass
- Field size: Left Field – 340 ft Left Center – 392 ft Deep Left Center – 440 ft Center Field – 396 ft Right Center – 323 ft Right Field – 280 ft

Construction
- Groundbreaking: 1900
- Opened: April 5, 1901
- Closed: October 3, 1908
- Demolished: 1912
- Cost: US$35,000 ($1.35 million in 2025 dollars)

Tenants
- Philadelphia Athletics (MLB) (1901–1908); Philadelphia Association Football Club (1901); Philadelphia Giants (Independent) (1902–1908); Philadelphia Athletics (NFL) (1902)

Columbia Park or Columbia Avenue Grounds was a baseball park in the Brewerytown neighborhood of Philadelphia. It was built in 1901 as the first home of the American League Philadelphia Athletics, who played there for eight seasons, including two games of the 1905 World Series. Columbia Park was also used by amateur and Negro League baseball teams, as well as for college and professional football. Columbia Park was repurposed and used for circus performances in 1909 after the Athletics' move to the larger Shibe Park. The site would be sold in 1913 and developed with residential housing.

== Neighborhood and Construction ==
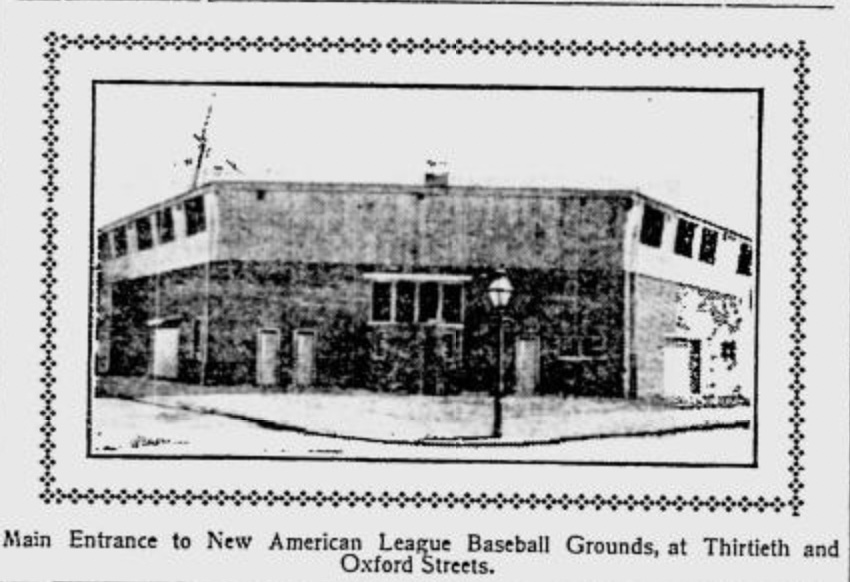
Columbia Park main entrance, 30th and Oxford Sts (March 1901)

Columbia Park was constructed in 1901 by the Philadelphia Athletics when the team was established with the creation of the American League. The site was a vacant lot owned by Luther Martin for which manager and part-owner Connie Mack obtained a ten-year lease. It occupied the block bordered by 29th Street, Oxford Street, 30th Street, and Columbia Avenue (later renamed Cecil B. Moore Avenue, in honor of the civil rights leader). The park was one city block, 400 (east-west) by 455 feet (north-south), and totaled 4.2 acres.

Martin had purchased the land in 1876 for US$50,000 (equivalent to $1,511,719 in 2025) from GW Tryon. On March 18, 1841, Tryon acquired the area from JE Ridgway for $14,000 as part of a ninety-five acre tract of farm land that extended to the Schuykill River at the west and Ridge Avenue at the north.

The area in 1901 was an active residential and commercial neighborhood familiar to Philadelphia sports fans and accessible by public transportation. The neighborhood was home to half of the city's breweries including F.A. Poth and Bergdoll Brewery, both among the largest producers in the country and within blocks of Columbia Park. It was often reported that the smell of hops and beer filled the ballpark and surrounding blocks. The city's earliest amateur and professional base ball clubs, Olympic, and then the National Association's Athletic Base Ball Club and later the American Association's Athletics had played until 1890 at the Jefferson Street Grounds four blocks southeast of Columbia Park. The Philadelphia Phillies had played their first seasons at Recreation Park, ¾ of a mile to the east of Columbia Park, as had the National Association Athletics.

Ballpark options were limited for the new Philadelphia club in 1901. The Phillies had moved to National League Park on N Broad Street which had the largest capacity in the city at 18,000, but closed to the Athletics who would compete for fans with the Phillies. Both the Jefferson Street Grounds and Recreation Park had been developed for residences and community use by 1901, Forepaugh Park had closed in 1894, and the PRR's YMCA Athletic Field would not be developed and opened until 1903.

Columbia Park was built by contractor James B. Foster at a cost of $35,000, equal to $1,354,500 today. In contrast to the Phillies' Philadelphia Ball Park built in 1887 and rebuilt in 1894 with non-union labor, the Athletics employed exclusively union in Columbia Park's 1901 construction. Philadelphia's union leaders praised the move, declaring in April 1901, "[we] welcome [the Athletics] amongst us as brother unionists, and promise them our support and assistance, and bespeak for them the hearty goodwill, favor and patronage of all self-respecting citizens of Philadelphia.

The stadium was small and originally had a seating capacity of only 9,500. This was increased to 13,600 by the addition of bleacher seating in the outfield. During sold out games, additional unofficial seating could be found on top of adjoining homes. There was only one dressing room, for the home team; visiting teams had to change at their hotel.

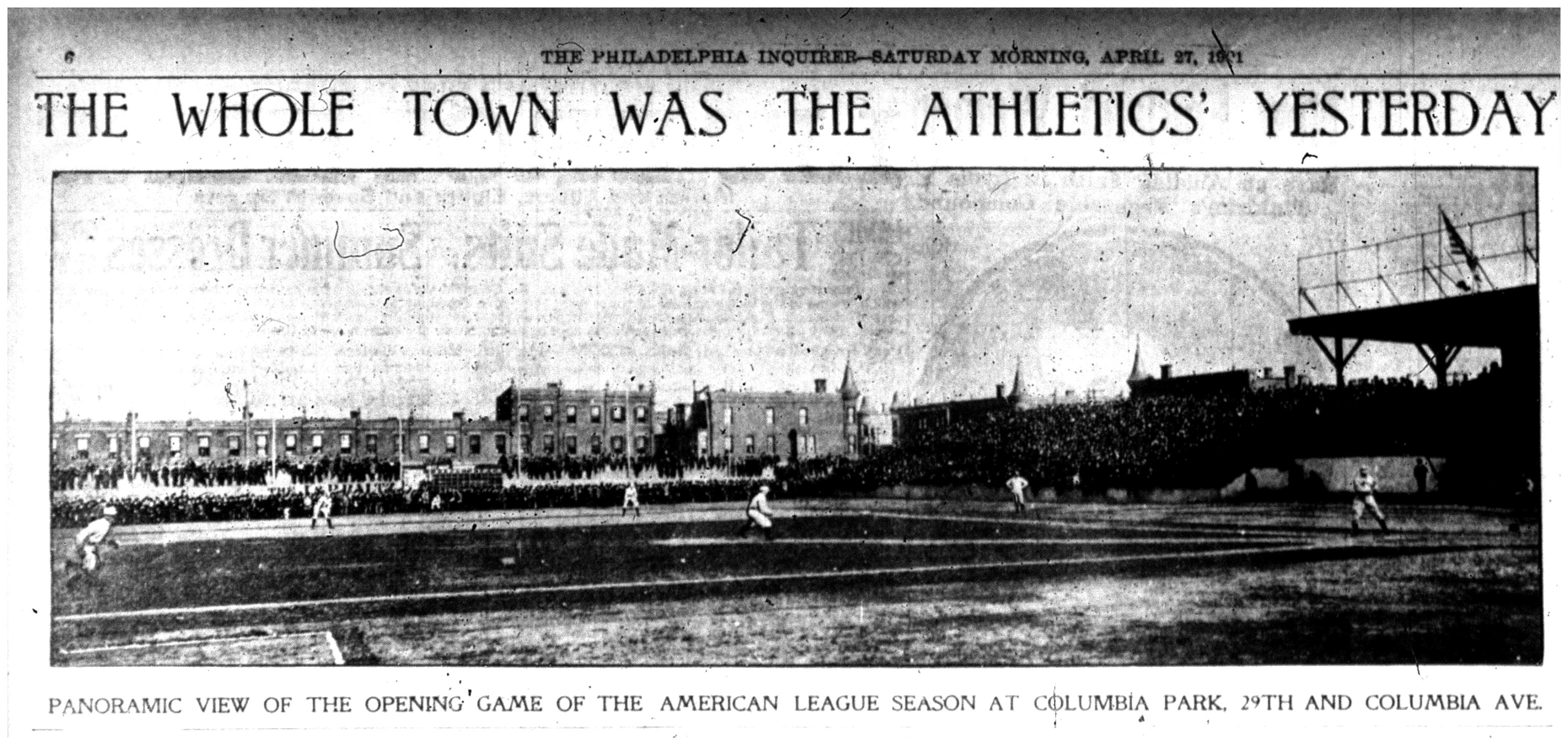
Photograph of Columbia Park on opening day, April 26, 1901, printed in The Philadelphia Inquirer; homes on 29th St can be seen beyond the right field fence.

At its opening in 1901, Columbia Park consisted of a single-deck covered grandstand that extended from first base to third base, and bleachers down both foul lines. On the roof of the grandstand was a small press box set between a wire screen on each side to keep foul balls inside the park. Right field was considerably shorter than left, and a screen of chicken wire 25-feet in height was erected atop the exterior right field wall all the way to centerfield to keep balls from flying onto 29th Street or hitting homes across the street.

Although the ballpark was in Philadelphia's Brewerytown section, beer sales were prohibited.

The ballpark was accessible by public transit lines. The Baltimore and Ohio Railroad station at 31st Street and Girard Avenue was a short walk to the park. Fans could also take the Pennsylvania Railroad to Philadelphia's Broad Street Station, exit at 15th and Filbert Streets, walk one block north to Arch, and take the Strawberry Mansion trolley to the field.

== Philadelphia Athletics (1901-1908) ==
During their tenure at Columbia Park, the Athletics won the American League pennant twice, the first time was in 1902, before the institution of the modern World Series.

The A's practiced at the park for the first time on April 5, 1901, with 600 fans in attendance. The first game at the ballpark was a preseason exhibition on April 8, 1901; the A's defeated Frank Moss' Professionals 8–1 in front of 1,000 fans on a cold and bleak day. Bill Bernhard started for the Athletics and his first pitch to Arlie Latham was a strike.

The first official game in Columbia Park was held on April 26, 1901, after the first two games were rained out. The Athletics played the Washington Senators in front of a crowd of 10,524, with some fans standing on the outfield walls and the roofs of nearby houses. The Athletics lost 5–1, despite three hits by second baseman Nap Lajoie.

In October 1902, following the regular season, the Athletics faced the independent Negro league Philadelphia Giants with future Hall of Famers Sol White at shortstop and Frank Grant at second base. The Athletics beat the Giants 8-3 on October 2, 1902 in front of 800 fans at Columbia Park.

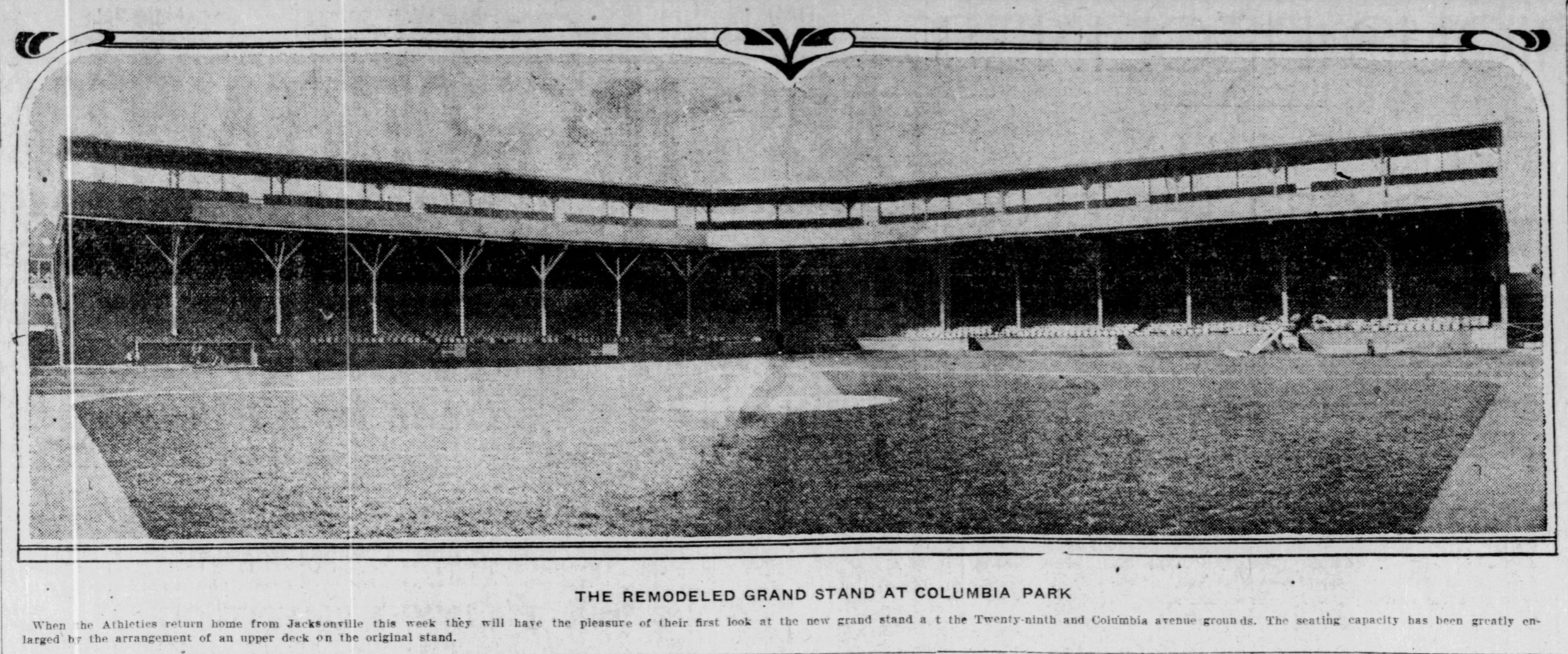
Remodeled grandstand at Columbia Park, March 1903

Following their successful 1902 season, the Athletics built a narrow upper deck on the rooftop of the ballpark.

The Phillies and the American Association Athletic, as well as the Eastern League Philadelphia Athletics in 1892, and Atlantic League Philadelphia Athletics in the late 1890s all played a City Series. The Phillies and American League Athletics revived the City Series tradition during the 1903 preseason. On Monday, April 6, 1903 at Columbia Park, the Phillies' Fred Mitchell beat the Athletics' Rube Waddell 2 to 0 in 10-innings in front of 6,543 fans.

The Phillies' Philadelphia Ball Park suffered a fatal collapse of its left field bleachers in August 1903. Prior to the 1905 season, the Athletics reinforced Columbia Park's seating and grandstands with heavy yellow pine joists which received the approval of the City of Philadelphia's Chief of the Bureau of Building Inspections.

On August 15, 1905, the A's Rube Waddell no-hit the St Louis Browns for 5-innings. The game was called on account of rain, and the no-hitter has not been officially recognized because the game did not go the full 9-innings.

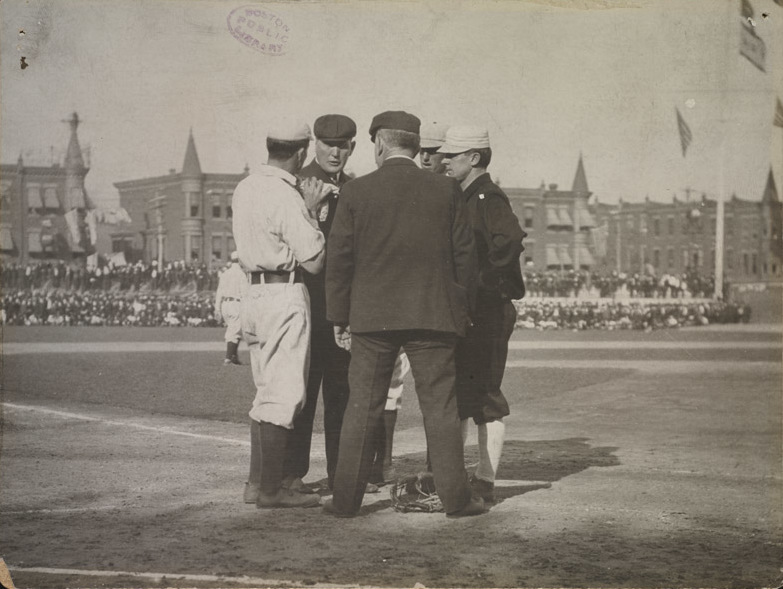
Conference on the field before 1905 World Series game at Columbia Park.

On September 28, 1905, the Chicago White Sox came into Philadelphia tied with the Athletics for first place in the American League. The Athletics won the first two games to go up two in the standing. For the third game on Saturday afternoon, September 30, more than 25,000 fans packed into Columbia Park to see Eddie Plank face off against the White Sox and 20-game winner Frank Owen. The Inquirer reported, "From every house top and window overlooking the field of action, scores of men and women kept watch... Telegraph poles also held their full quota of ball seekers, while the fence inclosing the grounds had the top of all of its four sides jammed." It was estimated that 10,000 fans were turned away. The record crowd would see the White Sox win 4-3 and draw within a game of the A's.

The Athletics would win their second pennant in 1905, and faced the New York Giants in the 1905 World Series. The Giants won the series 4 games to 1. Games 1 and 3 were held at Columbia Park, both games shutout victories for Giants future hall of famer Christy Mathewson.

As they had in September, fans swarmed Columbia Park on October 9, 1905 for game 1 of the World Series. 25,000 fans were estimated to have been admitted to the ballpark, and hundreds sat atop the four inclosing fences, on telegraph poles, stood on wagons, and from the windows and rooftops of the houses facing the park. Outside the park, those who could not gain admittance filled the streets. "Columbia avenue, Oxford street, Twenty-ninth street, and Thirtieth street were all black with surging crowds that hungered for bits of information as to how the game was going inside... Considerate fans, stationed at the top of bleachers or grand stand, passed out morsels of news to the anxious throngs without, who were thus enabled to follow the game, although prevented from witnessing it."

During the 1905 season, entrance to the bleachers cost 25 cents and the grandstand 50 cents; for the 1905 World Series, bleacher tickets were 50 cents and the grandstand $1.

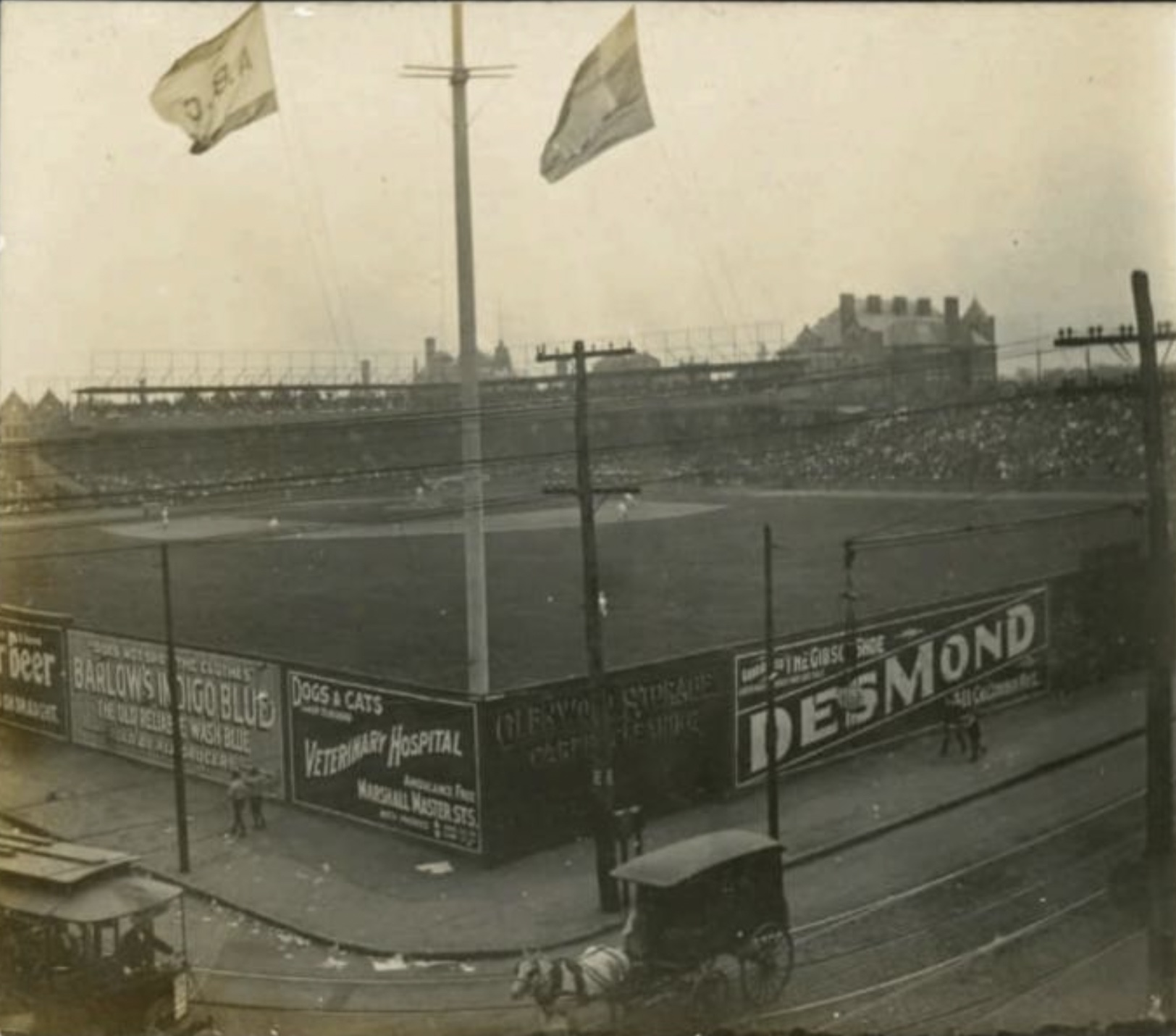
Columbia Park at 29th St/Columbia Ave during Athletics game against New York Highlanders in 1906

The Athletics reconstructed the left and right bleachers prior to the 1906 season. The first base and left field bleachers had previously run straight from the grandstand along 30th Street up to Columbia Avenue. The seating was angled in such way that spectators at the Columbia Avenue end in left field were unable to see the infield over fans in front of them. The club rebuilt the bleachers with heavy Florida yellow pine timber in a semi-circle, the seats extending to the left field foul line at Columbia Ave and facing the infield and home plate.

The Athletics and Detroit Tigers vied for the pennant through the 1907 season. The Tigers came into Philadelphia for a three game series on September 27, 1907 in a virtual tie for first-place. Detroit took the first game 5-4 to move in front of an official attendance of 17,926, exceeding Columbia Park's capacity. Saturday's game was postponed by rain, and Pennsylvania Blue Laws precluded play on Sunday. A double-header was scheduled for Monday. Detroit's Bill Donovan had pitched a complete game in the Friday game and was slated to start both games of the double-header.

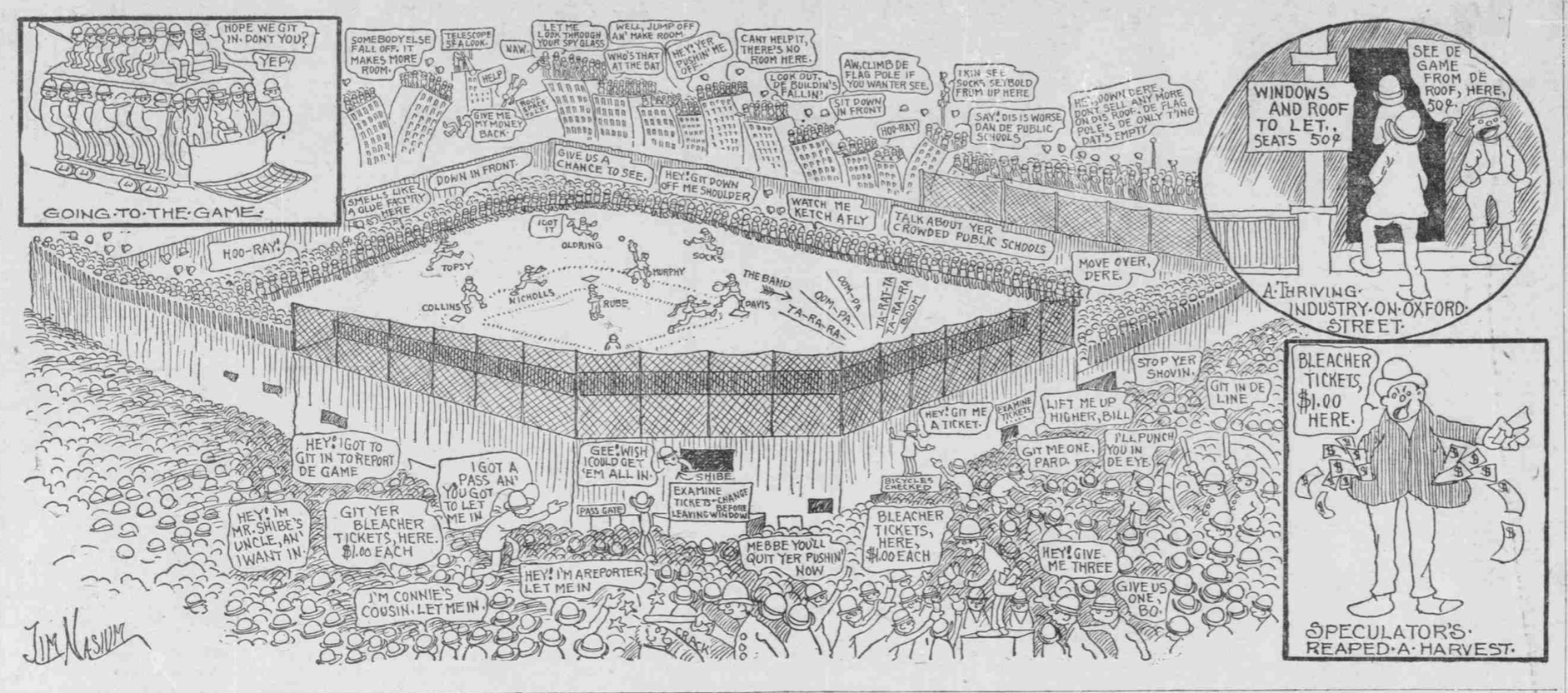
"As Jim Nasium saw the game from a point of vantage outside the grounds", on September 30, 1907 Athletics-Tigers game at Columbia Park in Philadelphia Inquirer, October 1, 1907

With a week left in the season, Athletics fans were eager to see the team capture the pennant. It was estimated that the team could have sold 50,000 tickets to the Monday double-header. With Columbia Park's limited capacity, an overflow crowd spilled into a roped-off area on the outfield grass. The gates were locked 30 minutes before game time with thousands of fans outside unable to gain admittance. Fans stormed the gates and climbed over the outside fence, with more than the official 24,127 seeing the game. The Philadelphia Inquirer would remark on the crowd, "Never before in the history of the national game has so great and remarkable a gathering of its enthusiastic followers been held anywhere." Fans scaled trolley and telegraph poles to watch the game. Local residents charged as much as $1 to $5 a person ($35 to $125 in 2025-dollars) to watch the game from windows. On the Twenty-ninth street side of the park, a fan in the grandstand lowered a rope up which fans scrambled from the street and into the park. Large men charged ten-cents to boost fans over the fence and into the park. Down by six in the fifth, the Tigers came into the ninth down 8-6. Sam Crawford opened the ninth with a single off of future Hall of Fame Rube Waddell bringing 20-year year old Ty Cobb to the plate. Cobb crushed Waddell's pitch, clearing the right-field fence by fifty-feet and onto 29th Street for a game-tying homerun. The teams both scored in the eleventh and would battle to a 9-9 tie in 17-innings before darkness ended the game. The Philadelphia Inquirer would call it "the most remarkable game ever played on the Athletic ground." Reflecting on his career in 1930, Cobb would tell Grantland Rice, "The biggest thrill I ever got came in a game was against the Athletics in 1907 [on September 30]..."

Shoeless Joe Jackson made his major league debut with the Athletics at Columbia Park in front of 2,258 fans on August 25, 1908 in a 3-2 loss to Cleveland playing centerfield and batting fourth. Jackson had hit .346 in 1908 for the Class-D Carolina Association Greenville Spinners and his appearance was anticipated by the press and fans. Jackson came to bat with one out in the first with Topsy Hartsel on third and Eddie Collins on first to face Cleveland's Heinie Berger. "The youngster was given a kindly welcome by the fans and he acknowledged it by singling past Bradley, scoring Hartsel." Jackson would finish the game 1 for 4, and play in five games for the A's in 1908.

Mack himself lived across the street from Columbia Park. He first rented a house at 2932 Oxford St facing the park's first base side; three years later he moved to 2937 Columbia Ave facing the ballpark's left field fence.

== Soccer, Baseball, and Football ==
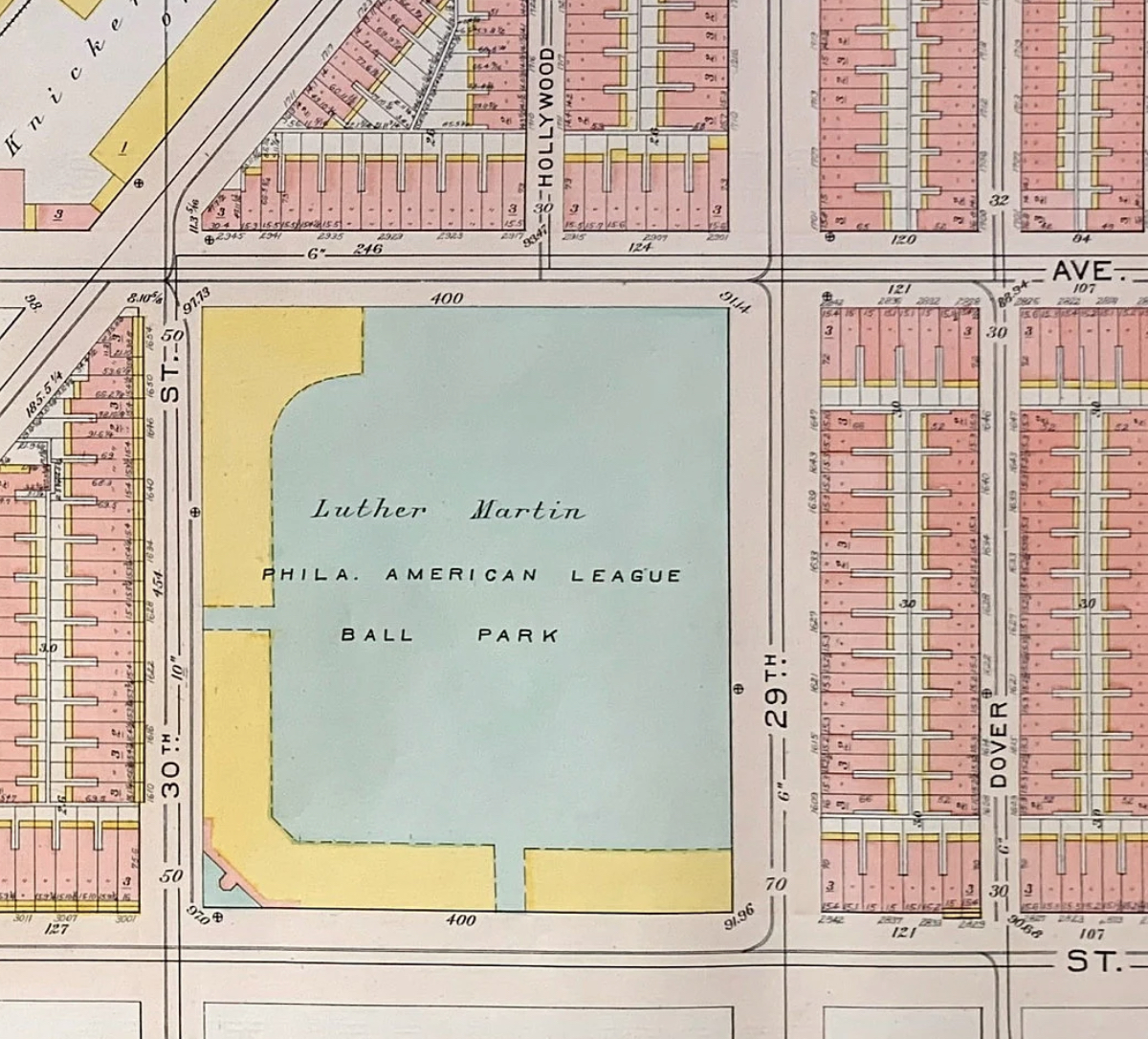
"Phila. American League Ball Park", Ward 29, 1907

Following the 1901 baseball season, and seeking attractions for the ballpark during baseball's offseason, Connie Mack organized a soccer team, the Philadelphia Association Football Club, hoping to capitalize on the city's strong interest in the game. Philadelphia's John A Manz team had won the 1897 American Cup soccer tournament and local leagues thrived in the city. Mack's team would compete in Philadelphia’s Allied Association of Football Clubs. On November 24, 1901, 500 fans showed at Columbia Park for an inter-squad scrimmage. The team played its first matches on Thanksgiving Day, November 28, 1901, with a double header against sides from the Belmont Cricket Club and West Philadelphia Cricket Club at Columbia Park. A large crowd was reported to have seen Mack's team defeat Belmont in the morning game 1-0; the club would defeat West Philadelphia by the same score in the afternoon. Winter rains turned the Columbia Park field to mud and multiple games were cancelled. The team would play through January 1902 and finish with a 7-1-0 record in the Allied Association before disbanding.

The Athletics leased the ballpark to the independent Negro league baseball club the Philadelphia Giants. The Giants played at the ballpark while the Athletics were on the road. Al Lawson had developed a "portable electric light plant" and exhibition games were held in Pottsville, Camden, and Philadelphia. On the night of June 3, 1902, the Giants played the Cosmopolitans club in a six-inning exhibition at Columbia Park, winning 15 to 13. The infield was illuminated by lights on 18 poles. The Philadelphia Record reported that a shadow was cast across the diamond that strained the eyes of the fans, labeling the exhibition a "disappointment". It was the first night baseball game in Philadelphia.

The Philadelphia Phillies temporarily called Columbia Park home in 1903 while their National League Park was repaired following the deadly balcony collapse on August 8, 1903. The Phillies would play sixteen games at Columbia Park in August and September 1903.

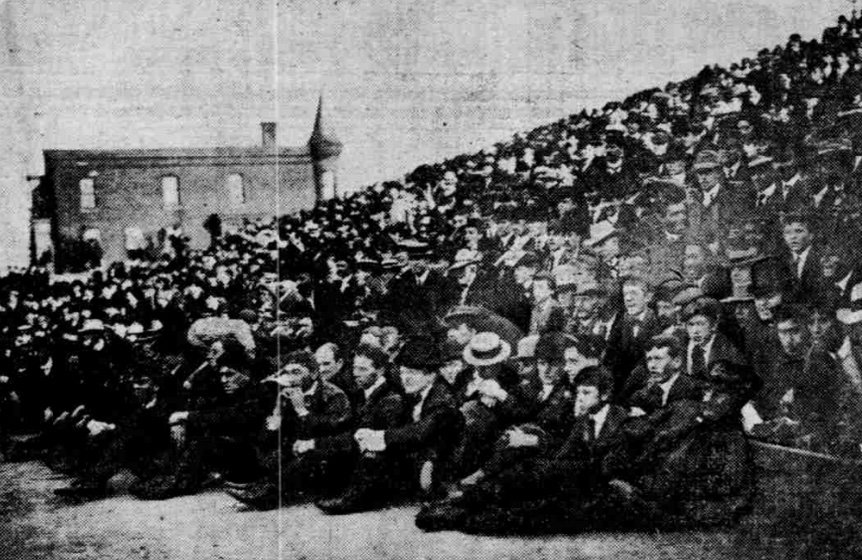
More than 20,000 fans crowd Columbia Park for Wilmington-Brandywine game on September 15, 1902

Amateur baseball championships were staged at Columbia Park by the Philadelphia Inquirer. On September 15, 1902, more than 20,000 fans turned out to see Wilmington defeat Brandywine 2-1, far exceeding the ballpark's capacity, and grossing $6,000 in gate receipts, all of which was awarded to the Wilmington team on top of the $1,000 prize money staked by the two clubs. Lines to the ballpark extended down Oxford Street to 31st, and it was estimated that 5,000 fans were turned away.

On October 12, 1903, the semi-professional Tri-State League contested its championship at Columbia Park between the state championship clubs from Camden, New Jersey; Harrisburg, Pennsylvania; and Wilmington, Delaware. On September 12, 1908, Columbia Park hosted a matchup between Philadelphia's amateur City Champions, Linwood, and New York's Interborough Amateur League championship High Bridge club; admission was free to the public.

Columbia Park hosted professional, college, and semi professional football. The football field was laid parallel to the left field seats with the end zones at the Oxford St and Columbia Ave ends of the ballpark.

The stadium served as the home of the Philadelphia Athletics football club in 1902, also owned by Athletics owner Benjamin Shibe and coached by Connie Mack, before the team folded in 1903.

On October 29, 1904, Georgetown defeated Holy Cross 17-4 in college football in front of 5,000 fans. On November 24, 1904, Villanova's football team defeated the Medico-Chi team 23–6.

== Circus and Development (1909-1913) ==
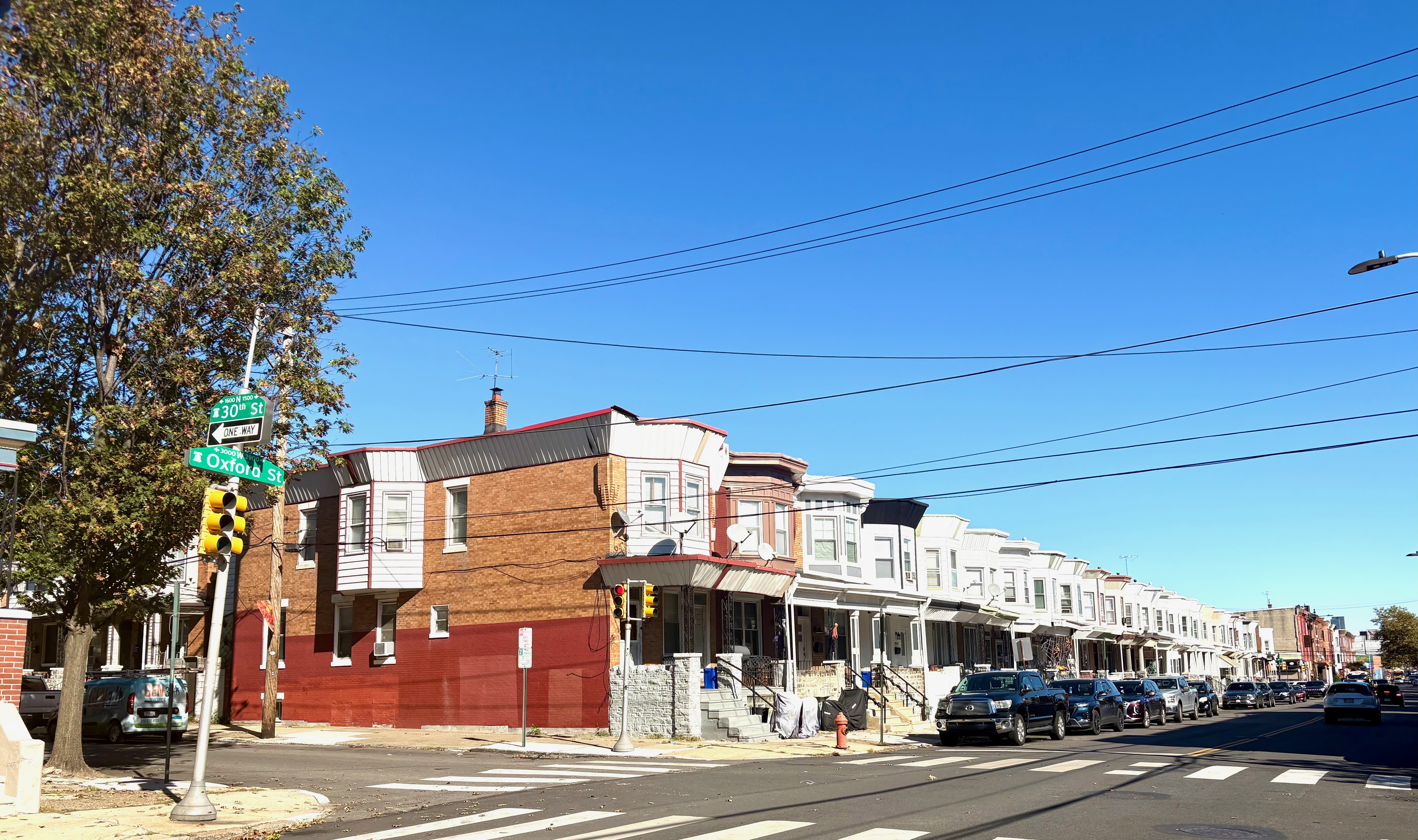
Columbia Park's grandstand and homeplate occupied the northeast corner of 30th/Oxford Streets; the first base line extended east down Oxford St to 29th St (October 2025)

Overflow crowds exceeding 20,000 for big games, demand for seating in the windows and on rooftops of buildings facing the park, and the 1905 World Series showed the ballpark inadequate for the demand of Athletics fans. The Athletics' board of directors empowered president Ben Shibe as early as 1906 to pursue the acquisition of land and construction of a new ballpark ahead of the maturation of the team's lease on Columbia Park. Shibe Park would open in 1909 with seating for 23,000 with standing room increasing its capacity.

The final game played at Columbia Park took place on October 3, 1908; the visiting Boston Americans defeated the Athletics 5–0 in the second game of a doubleheader. 1,282 fans turned out for the final game. The sod from Columbia Park was transplanted to Shibe Park after the 1908 season.

Beginning in 1909, promoter and manager M.W. Taylor presented the Philadelphia Hippodrome at the site with vaudeville, animal, and circus performances. Strong interest led to the addition of private boxes that could be reserved in advance, and daily performances were begun in July 1909. The season ran May 31, 1909 to September 11, 1909 and it was estimated that 1 million patrons saw the performances.

The 1910 Philadelphia Hippodrome season opened on May 16, 1910 and featured a high diver, acrobats, jugglers, wild west rough roughers, and musicians with performances every Saturday. Capacity was advertised as 10,000, admission was 10 cents, and reserved seating 20 cents.

The site was referred to as the "circus grounds" in a 1911 article. In September 1911, California Frank's All-Star Wild West show appeared at 29th and Columbia; admission was 25 cents.

On April 9, 1913, George A. Nahm purchased the former Columbia Park site from the Luther Martin Estate for $130,000, equal to $4,234,848 today. It was reported that streets would be cut through the block and developed for residential housing. Turner Street and Nicholas Street were built between Thirtieth and Twenty-ninth Streets north of Oxford Street and south of Columbia Avenue.

Columbia Avenue was renamed Cecil B. Moore Avenue in 1987 to honor the former president of the Philadelphia NAACP chapter and Philadelphia City Council member. There are no markers at the site recalling the ballpark's location.

Preceded by first ballpark	Home of the Philadelphia Athletics; 1901 – 1908	Succeeded by Shibe Park
