= Philadelphia Phillies (NFL) =

Former professional football team

General information
- Founded: 1901
- Folded: 1902
- Stadium: National League Park
- Headquartered: Philadelphia, Pennsylvania, United States
- Colors: Red, White, Blue

Personnel
- Owners: John Rogers (1902); Wilson Wright (1901)
- General manager: Bill Shettsline (1902); Wilson Wright (1901)
- Head coach: Ben Roller (1902); Blondy Wallace (1901)

Nicknames
- "Philadelphia Stars" "All-Stars" "Quakers" "Philadelphia Professionals" "Pros"

Team history
- Philadelphia Phillies (1902); Philadelphia Athletic Club (1901)

League / conference affiliations
- National Football League (1902)

The Philadelphia Phillies were a professional American football team based in Philadelphia, Pennsylvania in 1902. The team was a member of what was referred to as the National Football League—not to be confused with the National Football League of today. The whole league was a curious mixture of football players as well as baseball players who adapted to playing football. The Phillies were owned and financed by baseball's Philadelphia Phillies just as the owners of the Philadelphia Athletics financed their team, the Philadelphia Athletics. The Pittsburgh Stars made up the third team and was suspected of being financed by the Pittsburgh Pirates baseball team.

== History ==
=== Origins ===
The Phillies began as the Philadelphia Athletic Club in 1901. The team was more commonly called throughout Philadelphia as the Philadelphia Professionals or the Philadelphia Pros. It was the region's first entirely professional football squad. Wilson Wright, a Penn graduate, was the team's manager and chief financial backer. The team, led by Penn's Blondy Wallace, was largely made up of former Penn players along with a few veterans of such teams as the Duquesne Country and Athletic Club and the Latrobe Athletic Association.

==== 1901 ====
Philadelphia opened its 1901 season with shut outs of the Conshohocken Tigers, the Orange Athletic Club, Susquehanna University and a tough squad from Lafayette College. Next Philadelphia had to play the 1901 Homestead Library & Athletic Club football team. Homestead was a successful team that gave up only seven points over a span of two seasons and was clearly the strongest of the many competitive teams of Western Pennsylvania. In fact Homestead was considered it the best professional team in the nation. This match-up was generally accepted as the professional championship of the United States. Both teams worked diligently to prepare for the game. However Philadelphia proved no match for the Homestead team and lost by a score of 18–0. The two teams then closed out their seasons in Pittsburgh the following Saturday. This time Philadelphia lost by a score of only 6–5. They held Homestead to a single touchdown and managed to score the only touchdown against the team in two seasons.

=== Phillies ===
Although still lacking the established fan base of college football, Philadelphia Athletic Club benefited from being built on a strong foundation of well known local college talent. Philadelphia's first experience with pro football left fans in anticipation for the next season. This gained the attention of John Rogers, the owner of baseball's Philadelphia Phillies. In 1902 the war between baseball's well established National League and the new American League was really heating up. In an effort to get the upper hand in the battle for fans, Rogers took over the professional football club and renamed them the Phillies, after his baseball team. Blondy Wallace, who was a captain of the 1901 Pros team, left the team to join its cross town rival, the Athletics football team owned by baseball's Ben Shibe. The Phillies baseball manager, Bill Shettsline became the team's manager, while Ben Roller became the team's coach.

Both Rogers and Shibe knew that to lay claim to the "World Championship", they had to play a team from Pittsburgh, which was the focal point of football at the time. They called on pro football promoter Dave Berry and a Pittsburgh team was soon formed. These three teams are all that made up the first NFL. The league played all of its games on Saturdays, since there were no Sunday sports events according to Pennsylvania blue laws in 1902. The teams began playing various colleges and local football clubs before finally playing each other.

==== 1902 ====
The Athletics had split on the 1902 season with the Phillies, as had the Pittsburgh Stars. However each team carried a record of 2-2 for league play, with a complete record of 8–3. Pittsburgh had by far the better point ratio, scoring 39 points to their opponents' 22. Both the Athletics and the Phillies gave up more points than they scored in their league games. This led to a championship game between the A's and Stars. After playing the first game to a scoreless tie, Pittsburgh finally won the second championship game late in the fourth quarter to give them a controversial championship win. The defeated A's then went home and defeat the Phillies 17–6 to give them the city championship and a second showing in the league.

=== World Series of Football ===
In late December the 1902 World Series of Football was held at Madison Square Garden in New York City. While neither the Phillies nor Athletics participated in this event, several members of both squads joined on a team known variously as "New York", the "New Yorks" and the "New York Philadelphians". The New York team played in the first indoor football game against the Syracuse Athletic Club.

== Seasons ==
- 1901 Philadelphia Football Club season
- 1902 Philadelphia Phillies (NFL) season
