= Ben Roller =

American football player, professional wrestler and physician (1876 – 1933)

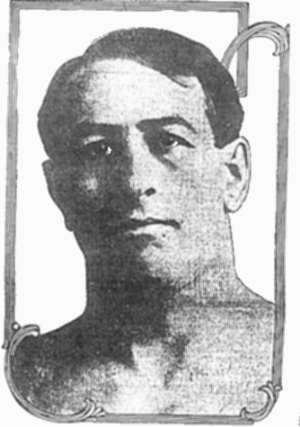
- Roller c. 1911

Profile
- Position: Guard

Personal information
- Born: July 1, 1876; Newman, Illinois, U.S.
- Died: April 19, 1933 (aged 56)
- Listed height: 6 ft 0 in (1.83 m)
- Listed weight: 200 lb (91 kg)

Career information
- College: Purdue, De Pauw

Career history

Playing
- 1898–1899: Pittsburgh Athletic Club
- 1900: Duquesne C. & A. C.
- 1901: Philadelphia Athletic Club
- 1902: Philadelphia Phillies
- 1902: "New York"
- 1903: Syracuse Athletic Club
- 1903: Franklin Athletic Club

Coaching
- 1902: Philadelphia Phillies

Awards and highlights
- World Series of Football champion (1903); "U.S. Pro Football Title" (1903)

Benjamin Franklin Roller (July 1, 1876 – April 19, 1933) was an American physician, a professional wrestler and a football player.

== Biography ==
=== Early life ===
Roller was born in Newman, Illinois. where he grew up on his family's farm. As a boy on the farm, Roller dreamed of becoming a doctor. His mother encouraged him to attend college, while his father felt that every man should make his way, picking up his education by experience.

He attended college at De Pauw University after his mother, a former school teacher, helped him prepare for the entrance examination. Due to the family's lack of money, Ben worked at a dry goods store, pulling nails for 15 cents an hour. He used the money to buy new clothes for attending school. Upon arriving at De Pauw, Roller started a gym class that began his athletic career in football and wrestling. He was the runt in his family of six, at 6'0 and 200 pounds. He soon became the captain of the school's football and track teams.

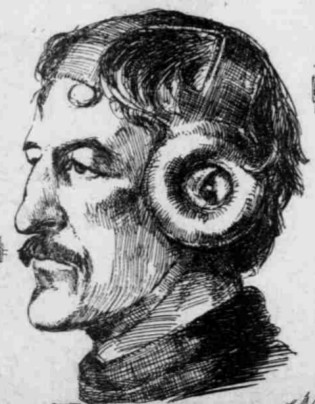
Roller in 1905

Upon graduation from De Pauw, Roller attended the University of Pennsylvania. With a lack of money for college, he soon began to play football in the professional ranks.

=== Professional football career ===
He played pro football for the Pittsburgh Athletic Club, Duquesne Country and Athletic Club, Philadelphia Athletic Club and was later a player-coach with the Philadelphia Phillies of the first National Football League. In December 1902, he played for the "New York" team during the World Series of Football. In 1903, he played with the Franklin Athletic Club and won his return trip to the World Series of Football with that team. He began the 1903 season with Syracuse Athletic Club.

He also played on several of the Penn college teams and won the "university championship" in his second and fourth years. However, he never played for the varsity because of a four-year rule.

=== Post-college ===
After graduating from Penn, Roller assisted Dr. Barton Cooke, a professor at the medical school, in writing a textbook. He accepted a position as a professor of physiology at the University of Washington. He also supervised the school's athletics and was an advisor to the Seattle Athletic Club. After two years with the school, he decided to open an office. He also worked as a land speculator and acquired wealth until the Panic of 1907.

=== Wrestling career ===
Ben Roller
Professional wrestling career
- Ring name(s): Doc Roller; Dr. Benjamin Roller; Dr. B.F. Roller; Dr. Roller
- Billed height: 6 ft 0 in (1.83 m)
- Billed weight: 200 lb (91 kg)
- Debut: 1906
- Retired: 1918

He later resigned from that position in 1906 to become a full-time wrestler. Roller's first professional match was against Jack Carkeek. Roller won two falls in 17 minutes and received $1,600. After that, he started having matches around the Northwest under the names Dr. Roller, Dr. Benjamin Roller, and Dr. B.F. Roller, and Doc Roller. He next wrestled Frank Gotch in an exhibition match, for which he received $4,000. After the bout with Gotch, Roller decided to use wrestling as a tool for traveling the world and studying under the noted professors in both the United States and Europe. Throughout his career, Roller defeated many of the top wrestlers of his day. These wrestlers included Farmer Burns, Fred Beell, Ed Lewis, and Joe Stecher, who Gotch managed. From 1906 to 1918, Roller posted a record of 39 wins, 26 losses, and four draws in 69 matches.

=== Death ===
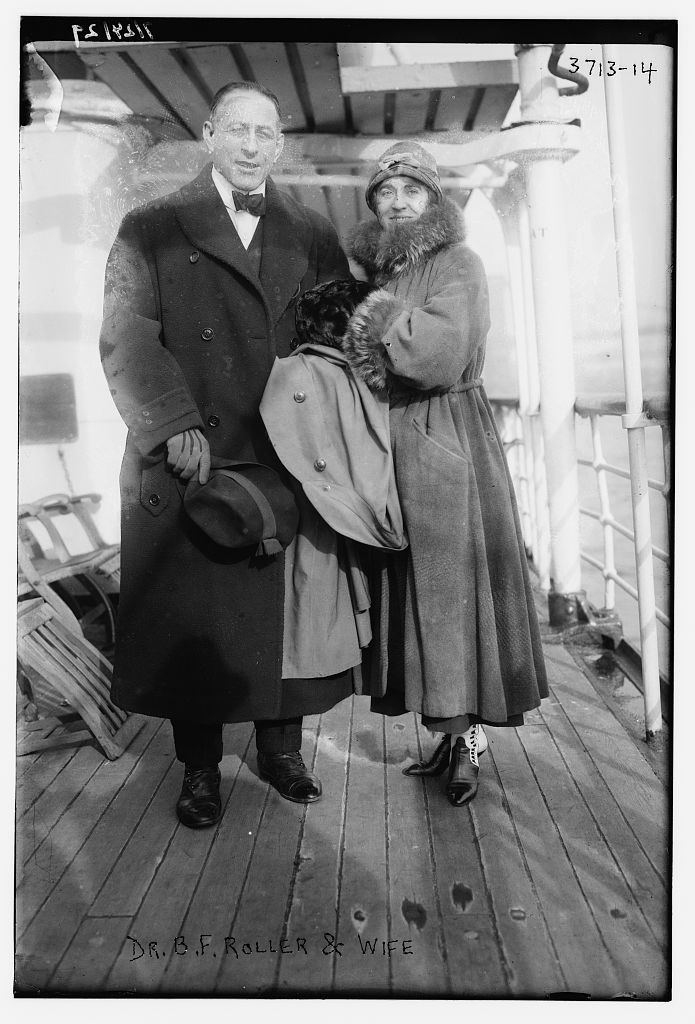
Roller in 1916

Roller died of pneumonia on April 19, 1933, at the age of 56.

== Championships and accomplishments ==
- Independent
  - American Heavyweight Championship (3 times)
- International Professional Wrestling Hall of Fame
  - Class of 2023
